= List of current ships of the Royal Canadian Navy =

Canadian Naval Ensign since 2013

The Royal Canadian Navy (RCN) is tasked to provide maritime security along the Pacific, Atlantic and Arctic coasts of Canada, exercise Canada's sovereignty over the Arctic archipelago, and support Canada's multi-national and bilateral interests overseas. It comprises the Pacific Fleet at Canadian Forces Base (CFB) Esquimalt, and the Atlantic Fleet at CFB Halifax. Officially, CFB Esquimalt is on Vancouver Island, in British Columbia, and is home to 15 vessels and 6,000 staff, the headquarters for Maritime Forces Pacific, His Majesty's Canadian (HMC) Dockyard Esquimalt, Fleet Maintenance Facility – Cape Breton (FMF-CB), Fire Fighting and Damage Control School, the Naval Officer Training Centre (NOTC Venture), and extensive housing. CFB Halifax is home port for the 18 vessels of the Canadian Atlantic Fleet and situated in Halifax, Nova Scotia. Officially, CFB Halifax employs 7,000 civilians and military staff, and hosts the Canadian Atlantic Fleet headquarters, HMC Dockyard Halifax, FMF Cape Scott, extensive maritime research facilities, an ammunition depot, and the four maritime squadrons of the Royal Canadian Air Force that deploy helicopters aboard ships.

The "effective strength" of the RCN is somewhat lower than official numbers would suggest due to serious personnel shortages. In late 2023, the commander of the RCN, Vice-Admiral Angus Topshee, reported that only 6,226 naval personnel could be considered part of the "effective strength" of the RCN, making numerous ships in the RCN inactive due to both crew shortages and broader operational readiness issues. In late 2025, Vice-Admiral Topshee stated that the Navy's personnel problem had not been solved and remained dire, while the Auditor General of Canada reported deeper systemic problems with Canadian military recruitment. In early 2026, Rear Admiral David Patchell, the commander of Canadian naval forces in the Pacific, reported that the navy was short about 2,000 personnel, or about one-quarter of its authorized strength including a shortage of about 1,000 naval technicians. In early 2024 it was reported that 54 percent of the navy's frigates, submarines, arctic and offshore patrol ships, and maritime coastal defence vessels were considered "unserviceable".

With the loss of area air defence capabilities in 2015 (and, temporarily, at-sea replenishment capabilities), the RCN was, at that time, classified as a Rank 5 navy (offshore regional coastal defence) on the Todd-Lindberg navy classification system, dropping from Rank 3 (multiregional power projection). Commissioned vessels are designated as 'His Majesty's Canadian Ship' (HMCS), minor ships as 'Patrol Craft Training' (PCT) and auxiliaries as 'Canadian Forces Auxiliary Vessel' (CFAV).

== Submarines ==
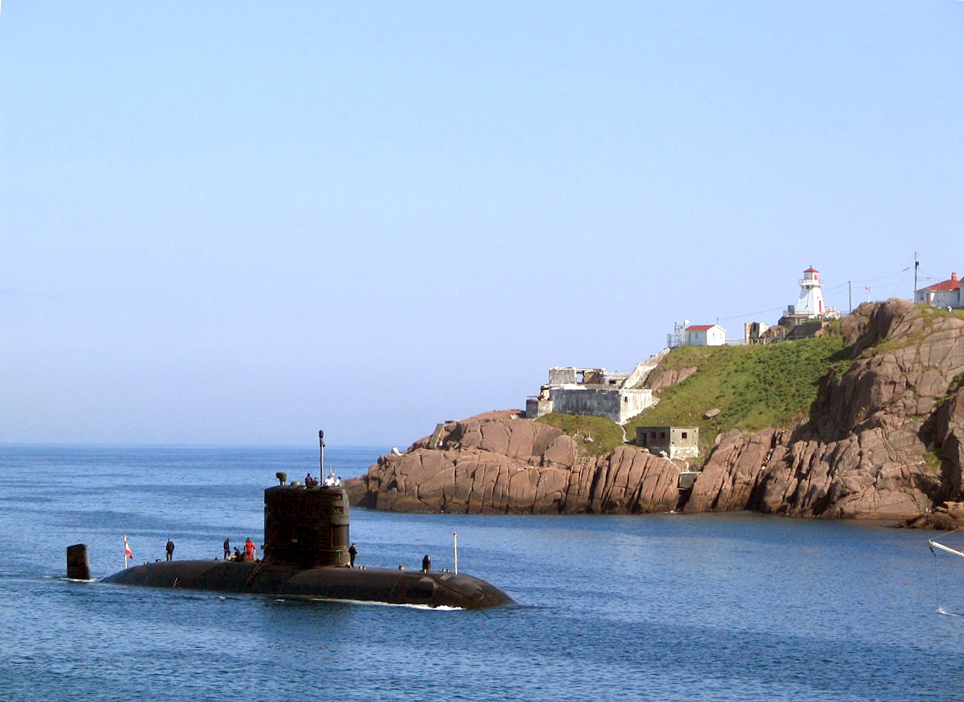
HMCS Corner Brook entering St. John's harbour, Newfoundland

The Victoria class are British-built diesel-electric fleet submarines designed in the late 1970s to supplement the British Royal Navy's nuclear submarine force. They were decommissioned at the end of the Cold War. In 1998, Canada purchased the used submarines, re-christening them the Victoria-class and using them to replace the aging Oberon-class submarines. Refit for Canadian service included the removal of sub-Harpoon missile firing and mine-laying capabilities, installation of torpedo launch systems and upgrades to weapons and fire control systems. Each vessel holds 53 crew.

Class	Boat	Pennant	Armament	Displacement	Propulsion	Service			
Class	Boat	Pennant	Armament	Displacement	Propulsion	Builder	Laid down	Commissioned	Fleet
Victoria class	HMCS Victoria	SSK 876	6 × 533 mm torpedo tubes; 18 × Mark 48 torpedoes	2,220 t surfaced; 2,439 t submerged	Diesel-electric, 37 MW (50,000 hp); 2 × Paxman Valenta 16 RPA diesel generators, 4,070 hp (3,030 kW); 2 × GEC, 5,000 kW (6,700 hp) motor-generators	Cammell Laird	12 August 1987	December 2000	Pacific
Victoria class	HMCS Windsor	SSK 877	6 × 533 mm torpedo tubes; 18 × Mark 48 torpedoes	2,220 t surfaced; 2,439 t submerged	Diesel-electric, 37 MW (50,000 hp); 2 × Paxman Valenta 16 RPA diesel generators, 4,070 hp (3,030 kW); 2 × GEC, 5,000 kW (6,700 hp) motor-generators	Cammell Laird	13 March 1990	October 2003	Atlantic
Victoria class	HMCS Corner Brook	SSK 878	6 × 533 mm torpedo tubes; 18 × Mark 48 torpedoes	2,220 t surfaced; 2,439 t submerged	Diesel-electric, 37 MW (50,000 hp); 2 × Paxman Valenta 16 RPA diesel generators, 4,070 hp (3,030 kW); 2 × GEC, 5,000 kW (6,700 hp) motor-generators	Cammell Laird	10 January 1989	March 2003	Pacific
Victoria class	HMCS Chicoutimi	SSK 879	6 × 533 mm torpedo tubes; 18 × Mark 48 torpedoes	2,296 t surfaced; 2,540 t submerged	Diesel-electric, 37 MW (50,000 hp); 2 × Paxman Valenta 16 RPA diesel generators, 4,070 hp (3,030 kW); 2 × GEC, 5,000 kW (6,700 hp) motor-generators	Vickers Shipbuilding and Engineering	February 1983	September 2015	Pacific

== Frigates ==
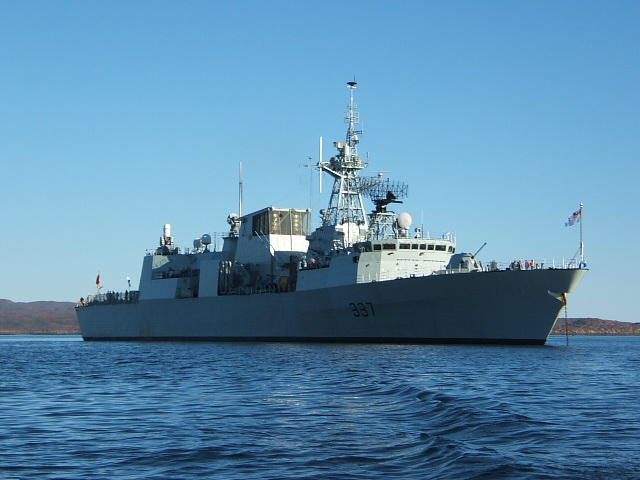
HMCS Fredericton, a Halifax-class frigate

The Halifax-class frigates are multi-role vessels with anti-submarine, anti-aircraft and anti-ship capability. In response to recent global security interests, the role of the class has shifted from open ocean to littoral engagement. Innovations in operational tactics have allowed the vessels of this class to adapt to new asymmetric surface threats. To ensure effective long-term capacity in this new threat environment the ships underwent a refit, including passive and active weapons, radars, and new combat architecture to meet the modern requirements. As of 2018, all twelve ships had been refitted. Each holds a complement of 225 officers and crew. All ships of the class are named after major Canadian cities.

Class	Ship	Pennant	Armament	Displacement	Propulsion	Service			
Class	Ship	Pennant	Armament	Displacement	Propulsion	Builder	Laid down	Commissioned	Fleet
Halifax class	HMCS Halifax	FFH 330	24 × Honeywell Mk 46 torpedoes; 16 × Evolved Sea-Sparrow SAM; 8 × RGM-84 Harpoon SSM; 1 × 57 mm Bofors Mk2 gun; 1 × 20 mm Vulcan Phalanx CIWS; 6 × .50-caliber machine guns; 1 × CH-148 Cyclone	3,995 t (light); 4,795 t (operational); 5,032 t (deep load)	2 × LM2500 gas turbines; 1 × SEMT Pielstick diesel engine	Saint John Shipbuilding	19 March 1987	29 June 1992	Atlantic
Halifax class	HMCS Vancouver	FFH 331	24 × Honeywell Mk 46 torpedoes; 16 × Evolved Sea-Sparrow SAM; 8 × RGM-84 Harpoon SSM; 1 × 57 mm Bofors Mk2 gun; 1 × 20 mm Vulcan Phalanx CIWS; 6 × .50-caliber machine guns; 1 × CH-148 Cyclone	3,995 t (light); 4,795 t (operational); 5,032 t (deep load)	2 × LM2500 gas turbines; 1 × SEMT Pielstick diesel engine	Saint John Shipbuilding	19 May 1988	23 August 1993	Pacific
Halifax class	HMCS Ville de Québec	FFH 332	24 × Honeywell Mk 46 torpedoes; 16 × Evolved Sea-Sparrow SAM; 8 × RGM-84 Harpoon SSM; 1 × 57 mm Bofors Mk2 gun; 1 × 20 mm Vulcan Phalanx CIWS; 6 × .50-caliber machine guns; 1 × CH-148 Cyclone	3,995 t (light); 4,795 t (operational); 5,032 t (deep load)	2 × LM2500 gas turbines; 1 × SEMT Pielstick diesel engine	Davie Shipbuilding	16 December 1988	14 July 1994	Atlantic
Halifax class	HMCS Toronto	FFH 333	24 × Honeywell Mk 46 torpedoes; 16 × Evolved Sea-Sparrow SAM; 8 × RGM-84 Harpoon SSM; 1 × 57 mm Bofors Mk2 gun; 1 × 20 mm Vulcan Phalanx CIWS; 6 × .50-caliber machine guns; 1 × CH-148 Cyclone	3,995 t (light); 4,795 t (operational); 5,032 t (deep load)	2 × LM2500 gas turbines; 1 × SEMT Pielstick diesel engine	Saint John Shipbuilding	22 April 1989	29 July 1993	Atlantic
Halifax class	HMCS Regina	FFH 334	24 × Honeywell Mk 46 torpedoes; 16 × Evolved Sea-Sparrow SAM; 8 × RGM-84 Harpoon SSM; 1 × 57 mm Bofors Mk2 gun; 1 × 20 mm Vulcan Phalanx CIWS; 6 × .50-caliber machine guns; 1 × CH-148 Cyclone	3,995 t (light); 4,795 t (operational); 5,032 t (deep load)	2 × LM2500 gas turbines; 1 × SEMT Pielstick diesel engine	Davie Shipbuilding	6 October 1989	29 December 1993	Pacific
Halifax class	HMCS Calgary	FFH 335	24 × Honeywell Mk 46 torpedoes; 16 × Evolved Sea-Sparrow SAM; 8 × RGM-84 Harpoon SSM; 1 × 57 mm Bofors Mk2 gun; 1 × 20 mm Vulcan Phalanx CIWS; 6 × .50-caliber machine guns; 1 × CH-148 Cyclone	3,995 t (light); 4,795 t (operational); 5,032 t (deep load)	2 × LM2500 gas turbines; 1 × SEMT Pielstick diesel engine	Davie Shipbuilding	15 June 1991	12 May 1995	Pacific
Halifax class	HMCS Montréal	FFH 336	24 × Honeywell Mk 46 torpedoes; 16 × Evolved Sea-Sparrow SAM; 8 × RGM-84 Harpoon SSM; 1 × 57 mm Bofors Mk2 gun; 1 × 20 mm Vulcan Phalanx CIWS; 6 × .50-caliber machine guns; 1 × CH-148 Cyclone	3,995 t (light); 4,795 t (operational); 5,032 t (deep load)	2 × LM2500 gas turbines; 1 × SEMT Pielstick diesel engine	Saint John Shipbuilding	8 February 1991	21 July 1994	Atlantic
Halifax class	HMCS Fredericton	FFH 337	24 × Honeywell Mk 46 torpedoes; 16 × Evolved Sea-Sparrow SAM; 8 × RGM-84 Harpoon SSM; 1 × 57 mm Bofors Mk2 gun; 1 × 20 mm Vulcan Phalanx CIWS; 6 × .50-caliber machine guns; 1 × CH-148 Cyclone	3,995 t (light); 4,795 t (operational); 5,032 t (deep load)	2 × LM2500 gas turbines; 1 × SEMT Pielstick diesel engine	Saint John Shipbuilding	25 April 1992	10 September 1994	Atlantic
Halifax class	HMCS Winnipeg	FFH 338	24 × Honeywell Mk 46 torpedoes; 16 × Evolved Sea-Sparrow SAM; 8 × RGM-84 Harpoon SSM; 1 × 57 mm Bofors Mk2 gun; 1 × 20 mm Vulcan Phalanx CIWS; 6 × .50-caliber machine guns; 1 × CH-148 Cyclone	3,995 t (light); 4,795 t (operational); 5,032 t (deep load)	2 × LM2500 gas turbines; 1 × SEMT Pielstick diesel engine	Saint John Shipbuilding	20 March 1993	23 June 1995	Pacific
Halifax class	HMCS Charlottetown	FFH 339	24 × Honeywell Mk 46 torpedoes; 16 × Evolved Sea-Sparrow SAM; 8 × RGM-84 Harpoon SSM; 1 × 57 mm Bofors Mk2 gun; 1 × 20 mm Vulcan Phalanx CIWS; 6 × .50-caliber machine guns; 1 × CH-148 Cyclone	3,995 t (light); 4,795 t (operational); 5,032 t (deep load)	2 × LM2500 gas turbines; 1 × SEMT Pielstick diesel engine	Saint John Shipbuilding	18 December 1993	9 September 1995	Atlantic
Halifax class	HMCS St. John's	FFH 340	24 × Honeywell Mk 46 torpedoes; 16 × Evolved Sea-Sparrow SAM; 8 × RGM-84 Harpoon SSM; 1 × 57 mm Bofors Mk2 gun; 1 × 20 mm Vulcan Phalanx CIWS; 6 × .50-caliber machine guns; 1 × CH-148 Cyclone	3,995 t (light); 4,795 t (operational); 5,032 t (deep load)	2 × LM2500 gas turbines; 1 × SEMT Pielstick diesel engine	Saint John Shipbuilding	24 August 1994	16 June 1996	Atlantic
Halifax class	HMCS Ottawa	FFH 341	24 × Honeywell Mk 46 torpedoes; 16 × Evolved Sea-Sparrow SAM; 8 × RGM-84 Harpoon SSM; 1 × 57 mm Bofors Mk2 gun; 1 × 20 mm Vulcan Phalanx CIWS; 6 × .50-caliber machine guns; 1 × CH-148 Cyclone	3,995 t (light); 4,795 t (operational); 5,032 t (deep load)	2 × LM2500 gas turbines; 1 × SEMT Pielstick diesel engine	Saint John Shipbuilding	29 April 1995	28 September 1996	Pacific

== Offshore patrol ships ==
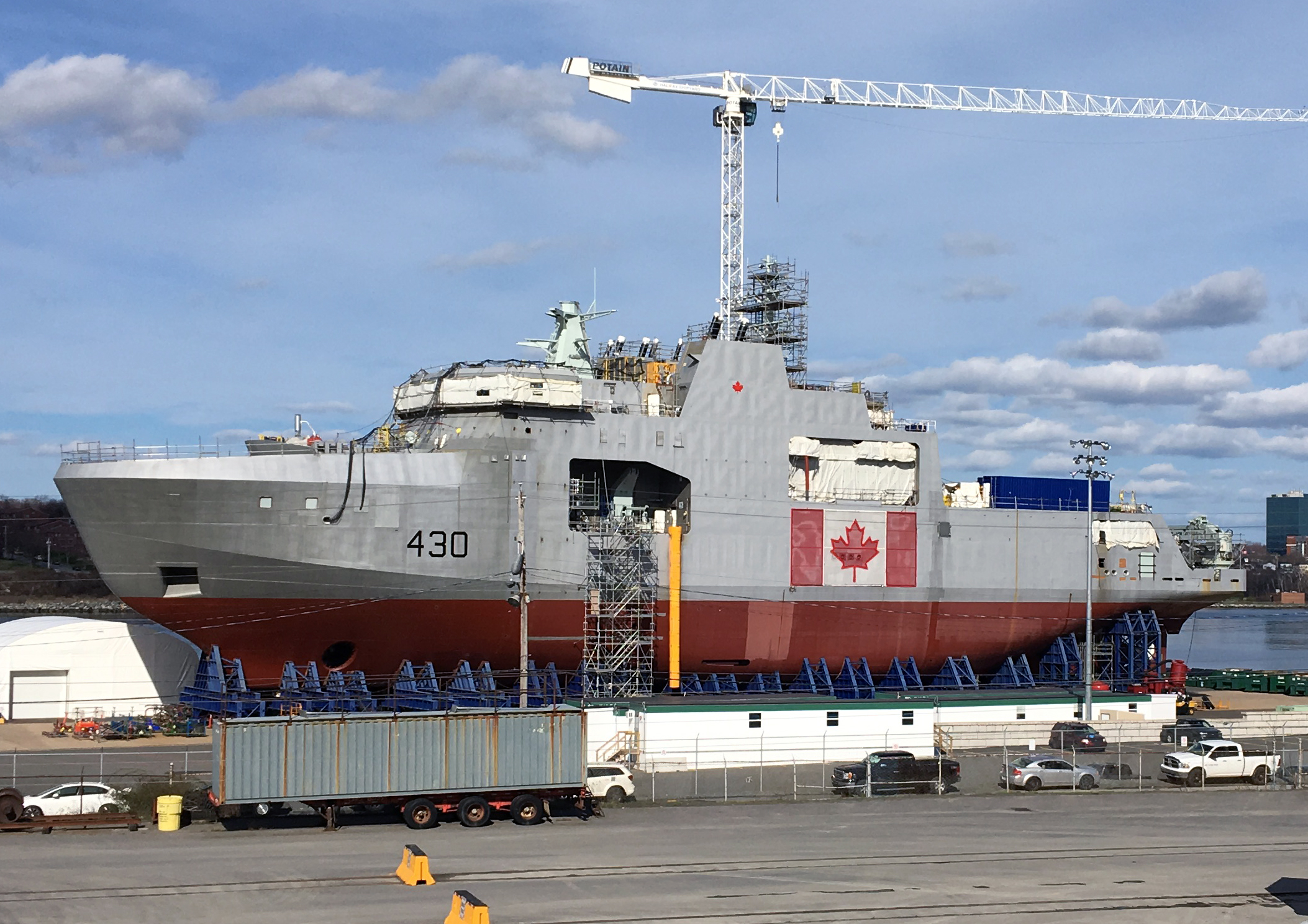
HMCS Harry DeWolf under construction, May 2018

The Harry DeWolf-class offshore patrol vessels are warships from the Arctic and Offshore Patrol Ship (AOPS) procurement project, part of the National Shipbuilding Strategy. In July 2007 the federal government announced plans for acquiring six to eight icebreaking warships for the RCN. The class is based on the Norwegian Coast Guard ship NoCGV Svalbard, and is named after Vice Admiral Harry DeWolf. The class is equipped with a hangar and flight deck and can operate the Sikorsky CH-148 Cyclone. The ships can deploy with multiple payloads, including shipping containers, underwater survey equipment or landing craft and have a 20-tonne (20-long-ton; 22-short-ton) crane for loading and unloading. They are for use in the Arctic regions of Canada for patrol and support within Canada's exclusive economic zone.

Class	Ship	Pennant	Armament	Displacement	Propulsion	Service			
Class	Ship	Pennant	Armament	Displacement	Propulsion	Builder	Laid down	Commissioned	Fleet
Harry DeWolf class	HMCS Harry DeWolf	AOPV 430	1 × BAE Mk 38 25 mm (0.98 in) gun; 2 × M2 Browning machine gun	6,615 t	2 × Diesel-electric, 4.5 MW (6,000 hp), 2 shafts	Irving Shipbuilding	11 March 2016	26 June 2021	Atlantic
Harry DeWolf class	HMCS Margaret Brooke	AOPV 431	1 × BAE Mk 38 25 mm (0.98 in) gun; 2 × M2 Browning machine gun	6,615 t	2 × Diesel-electric, 4.5 MW (6,000 hp), 2 shafts	Irving Shipbuilding	29 May 2017	28 October 2022	Atlantic
Harry DeWolf class	HMCS Max Bernays	AOPV 432	1 × BAE Mk 38 25 mm (0.98 in) gun; 2 × M2 Browning machine gun	6,615 t	2 × Diesel-electric, 4.5 MW (6,000 hp), 2 shafts	Irving Shipbuilding	5 December 2018	3 May 2024	Pacific
Harry DeWolf class	HMCS William Hall	AOPV 433	1 × BAE Mk 38 25 mm (0.98 in) gun; 2 × M2 Browning machine gun	6,615 t	2 × Diesel-electric, 4.5 MW (6,000 hp), 2 shafts	Irving Shipbuilding	17 February 2021	16 May 2024	Atlantic
Harry DeWolf class	HMCS Frédérick Rolette	AOPV 434	1 × BAE Mk 38 25 mm (0.98 in) gun; 2 × M2 Browning machine gun	6,615 t	2 × Diesel-electric, 4.5 MW (6,000 hp), 2 shafts	Irving Shipbuilding	29 June 2022	13 June 2025	Atlantic
Harry DeWolf class	HMCS Robert Hampton Gray	AOPV 435	1 × BAE Mk 38 25 mm (0.98 in) gun; 2 × M2 Browning machine gun	6,615 t	2 × Diesel-electric, 4.5 MW (6,000 hp), 2 shafts	Irving Shipbuilding	21 August 2023	16 November 2026	

== Maritime coastal defence vessels ==
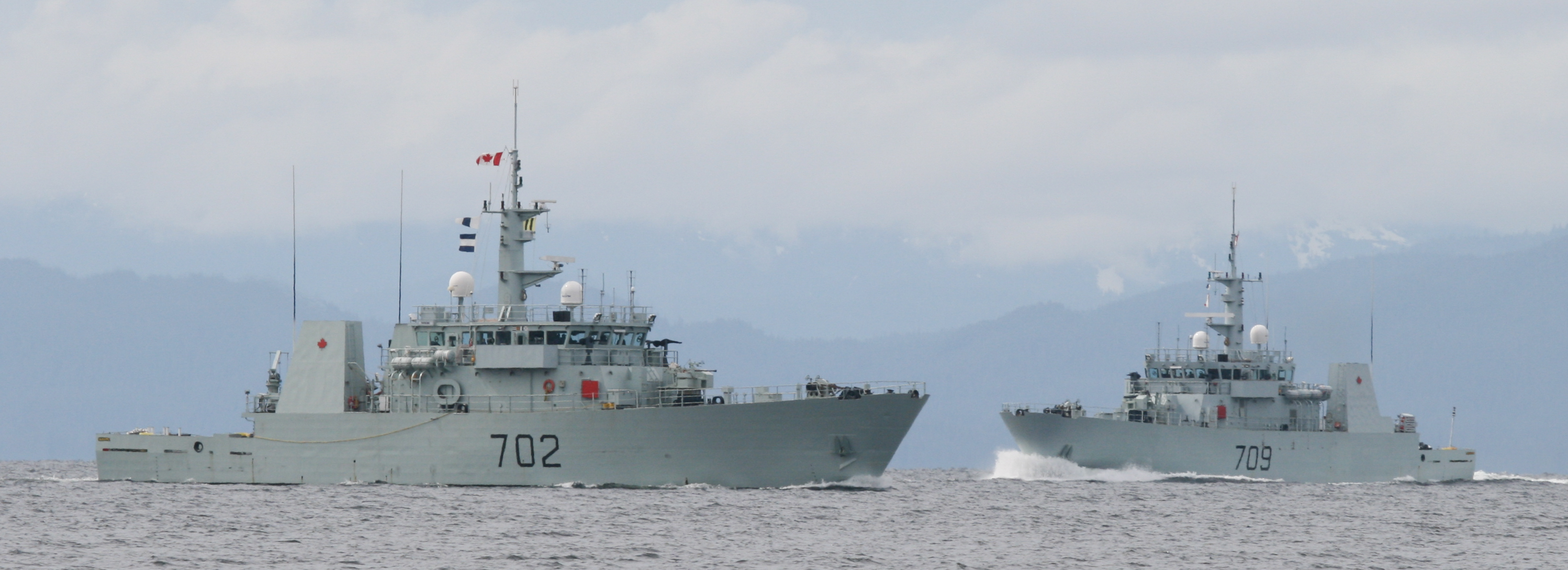
HMCS Nanaimo and Saskatoon, two Kingston-class maritime coastal defence vessels

The Kingston-class coastal defence vessels are multi-role vessels built and launched from the mid- to late-1990s and are crewed by a combination of Naval Reserve and Regular-Force personnel. Each vessel displaces 970 t and runs with a complement of between 31 and 47 officers and crew. Their main missions are counter narcotics, coastal surveillance, sovereignty patrol, route survey, and training. The ships' capabilities include a mechanical minesweeping system, a route survey system, and a bottom object inspection vehicle.

Of twelve ships in class, only four remain in active service. The rest of the class was paid off and decommissioned in late 2025. HMCS Yellowknife is set to be paid off in 2026, followed by Edmonton in 2027, and finally Nanaimo and Moncton in 2028.

Class	Ship	Pennant	Armament	Displacement	Propulsion	Service			
Class	Ship	Pennant	Armament	Displacement	Propulsion	Builder	Laid down	Commissioned	Fleet
Kingston class	HMCS Nanaimo	MM 702	2 × M2 machine guns	970 t	2 × Jeumont DC electric motors; 4 × 600 V AC Wärtsilä SACM V12 diesel alternators	Halifax Shipyards	11 August 1995	10 May 1997	Atlantic
Kingston class	HMCS Edmonton	MM 703	2 × M2 machine guns	970 t	2 × Jeumont DC electric motors; 4 × 600 V AC Wärtsilä SACM V12 diesel alternators	Halifax Shipyards	8 December 1995	21 June 1997	Atlantic
Kingston class	HMCS Yellowknife	MM 706	2 × M2 machine guns	970 t	2 × Jeumont DC electric motors; 4 × 600 V AC Wärtsilä SACM V12 diesel alternators	Halifax Shipyards	7 November 1996	18 April 1998	Atlantic
Kingston class	HMCS Moncton	MM 708	2 × M2 machine guns	970 t	2 × Jeumont DC electric motors; 4 × 600 V AC Wärtsilä SACM V12 diesel alternators	Halifax Shipyards	31 May 1997	12 July 1998	Atlantic

== Patrol and training vessels ==
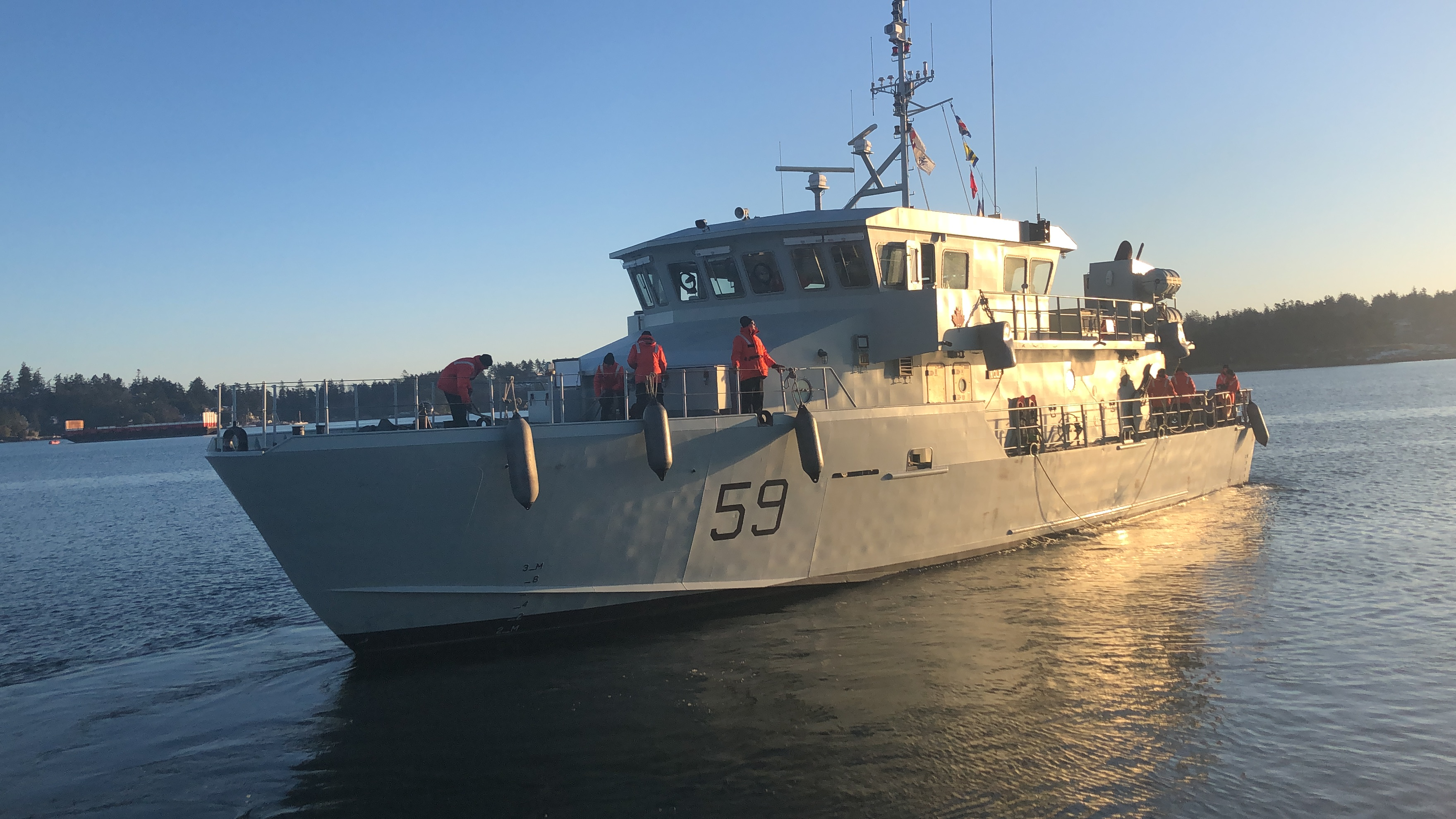
Wolf

Orca-class patrol vessels are primarily used for one-to-six-week long 'at sea' naval officer training. Regular force boatswains, engineers and naval communicators serve in these ships to train junior officers and non-commissioned sailors. They also patrol coastal waters for pollution infractions and fishing violations, and are frequently tasked for search and rescue operations. They operate year-round in the coastal waters of British Columbia.

Class	Ship	Pennant	Armament	Displacement	Propulsion	Service		
Class	Ship	Pennant	Armament	Displacement	Propulsion	Builder	Accepted	Fleet
Orca class	Orca	PCT 55	Unarmed (capable of being fitted with M2 machine gun)	210 t	2 × Caterpillar 3516B diesel engines, 1,900 kW (2,500 hp) each	Victoria Shipyards	9 November 2006	Pacific
Orca class	Raven	PCT 56	Unarmed (capable of being fitted with M2 machine gun)	210 t	2 × Caterpillar 3516B diesel engines, 1,900 kW (2,500 hp) each	Victoria Shipyards	15 March 2007	Pacific
Orca class	Caribou	PCT 57	Unarmed (capable of being fitted with M2 machine gun)	210 t	2 × Caterpillar 3516B diesel engines, 1,900 kW (2,500 hp) each	Victoria Shipyards	31 July 2007	Pacific
Orca class	Renard	PCT 58	Unarmed (capable of being fitted with M2 machine gun)	210 t	2 × Caterpillar 3516B diesel engines, 1,900 kW (2,500 hp) each	Victoria Shipyards	13 September 2007	Pacific
Orca class	Wolf	PCT 59	Unarmed (capable of being fitted with M2 machine gun)	210 t	2 × Caterpillar 3516B diesel engines, 1,900 kW (2,500 hp) each	Victoria Shipyards	29 November 2007	Pacific
Orca class	Grizzly	PCT 60	Unarmed (capable of being fitted with M2 machine gun)	210 t	2 × Caterpillar 3516B diesel engines, 1,900 kW (2,500 hp) each	Victoria Shipyards	19 March 2008	Pacific
Orca class	Cougar	PCT 61	Unarmed (capable of being fitted with M2 machine gun)	210 t	2 × Caterpillar 3516B diesel engines, 1,900 kW (2,500 hp) each	Victoria Shipyards	2 October 2008	Pacific
Orca class	Moose	PCT 62	Unarmed (capable of being fitted with M2 machine gun)	210 t	2 × Caterpillar 3516B diesel engines, 1,900 kW (2,500 hp) each	Victoria Shipyards	27 November 2008	Pacific

== Support and auxiliary vessels ==
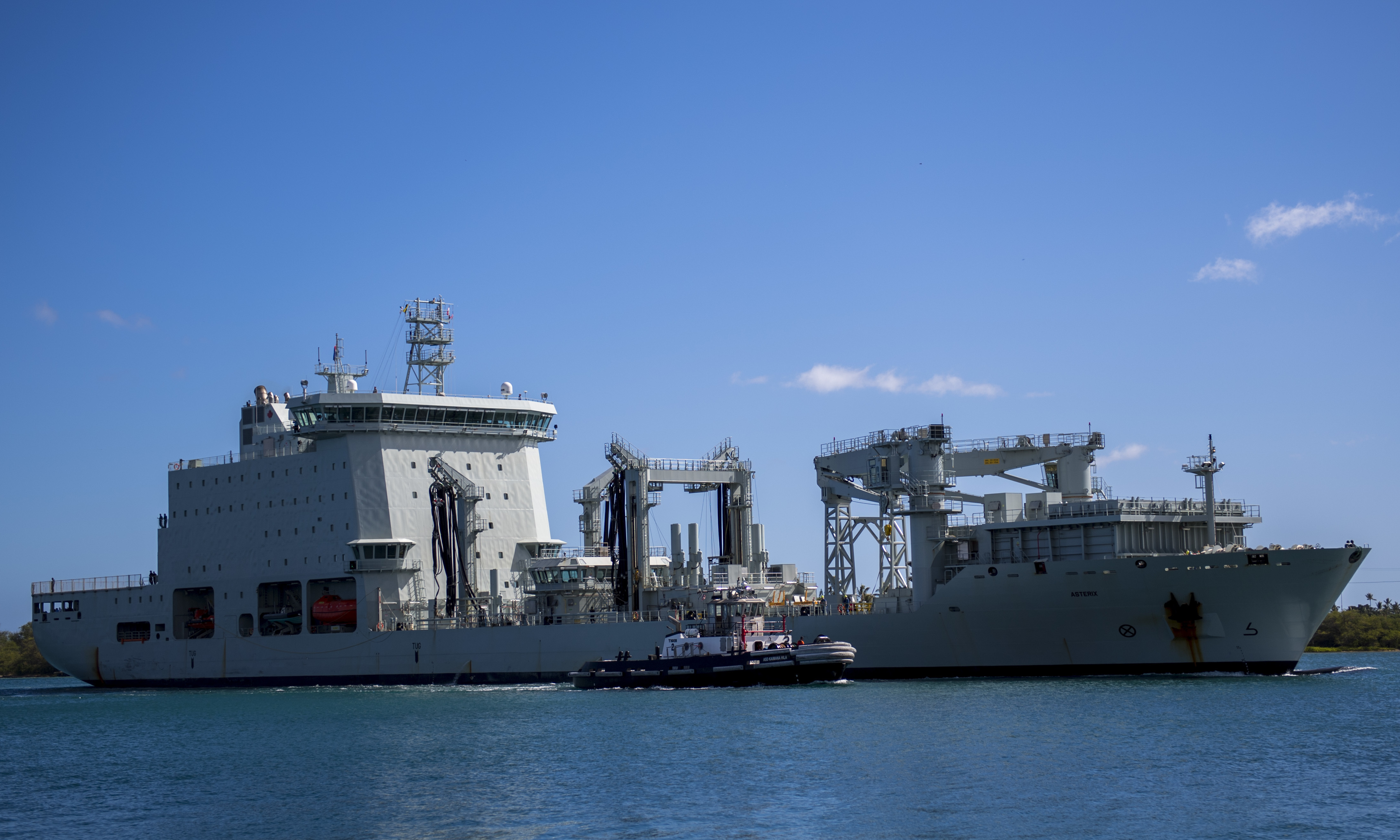
MV Asterix arrives at Pearl Harbor, June 2018

=== Interim auxiliary replenishment vessel ===
- Asterix

=== Sail training ships ===
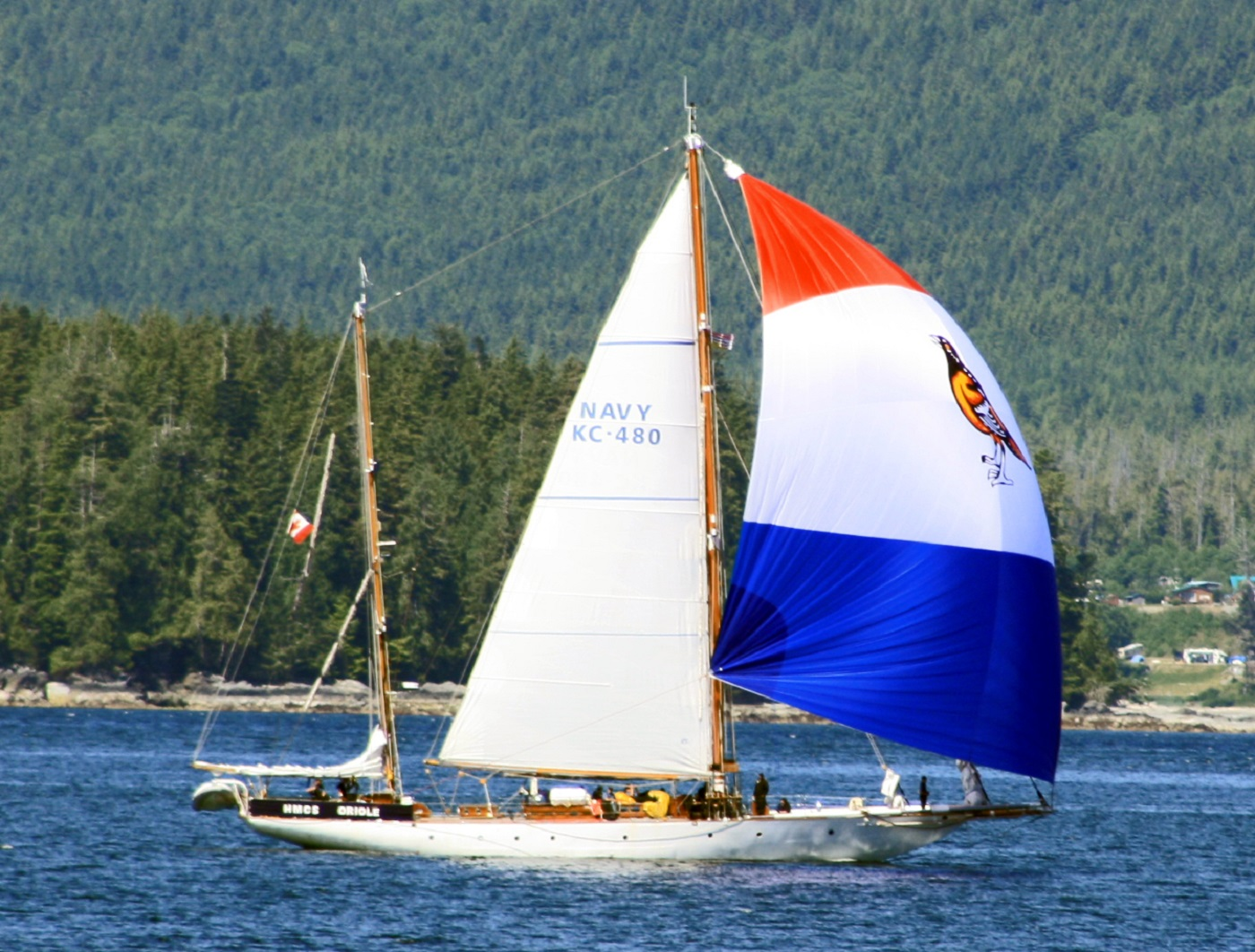
HMCS Oriole is the oldest commissioned ship in the navy.

- HMCS Oriole (KC 480)
- HMSTV Goldcrest (KC 2355)
- HMSTV Tuna (KC 2372)
- HMSTV Osprey (CAN 4510)
- HMSTV Eagle (CAN 4511)

=== Torpedo and sound ranging vessels ===
- CFAV Sikanni (YTP 611)
- CFAV Stikine (YTP 613)

=== Yard diving tenders ===
- Unnamed (YDT 11)
- CFAV Granby (YDT 12)
- CFAV Tonnerre (YDT 21)
- CFAV Sechelt (YDT 610)
- CFAV Sooke (YDT 612)

=== Tugboats ===
- CFAV Glendyne (YTB 640)
- CFAV Glendale (YTB 641)
- CFAV Glenevis (YTB 642)
- CFAV Glenbrook (YTB 643)
- CFAV Glenside (YTB 644)
- CFAV Tillicum (YTM 555)
- CFAV Lawrenceville (YTL 590)
- CFAV Parksville (YTL 591)
- CFAV Listerville (YTL 592)
- CFAV Merrickville (YTL 593)
- CFAV Granville (YTL 594)
- CFAV Haro
- CFAV Barkerville
- CFAV Canso
- CFAV Stella Maris

=== Yard auxiliary general ===
- CFAV Pelican (YAG 4)
- CFAV Gemini (YAG 650)
- CFAV Pegasus (YAG 651)
- CFAV Albatross (YAG 661)
- CFAV Black Duck (YAG 660)
- CFAV Egret

== Development and procurement ==
The National Shipbuilding Procurement Strategy will invest more than $60 billion into the development of Arctic capable patrol vessels, frigate-class surface warships, and long-range auxiliary supply vessels. Six Harry DeWolf-class patrol vessels have been delivered under the Arctic Patrol Ship Project (AOPS).

=== Submarines ===
The Canadian government plans to replace the Victoria-class submarines starting in the mid-2030s at the latest as part of the Canadian Patrol Submarine project. In July 2024, Canada launched the process to acquire up to 12 conventional attack submarines.

Potential suppliers:

- Germany and Norway offered to Canada a collaboration on the Arctic defence and the Type 212CD submarine. Canada signed a letter of intent to establish a maritime partnership, but it does not commit Canada to the purchase of the Type 212CD.
- South Korea approached Canada to supply its KSS-III submarine to Canada.
- Sweden with Saab expressed interest in participating in a potential competition.

In August 2025 the Canadian government shortlisted the German/Norwegian Type 212CD and the South Korean KSS-III. On 6 July 2026, TKMS's Type 212CD was selected as the next submarine.

=== Destroyers ===
Canada will acquire up to 15 new warships via the River-class destroyer program. The program entered the test module construction phase in 2024, when the first three ships were ordered. In June 2025, the River class entered full-rate production. The RCN has upgraded all current frigates with advanced systems and life extension maintenance to maximize operational capability into the 2030s.

=== Corvettes ===
The Kingston-class vessels will be retired beginning in late 2025. The RCN's early planning for a replacement was a similar patrol vessel which would alleviate some of the Kingston class' limitations in areas such as speed, seakeeping and armament. The RCN plans to build 16–20 corvettes under a project called the Continental Defence Corvette. These proposed ships will be larger than the Kingston class, have upgraded armament and an ice-strengthened hull to allow operations near ice edge in the Arctic. The contracts are expected to be awarded in 2030, with the first ship operational by 2039. As of August 2026, four Kingston-class vessels remain in service.

=== Auxiliary fleet ===
==== Supply ship ====
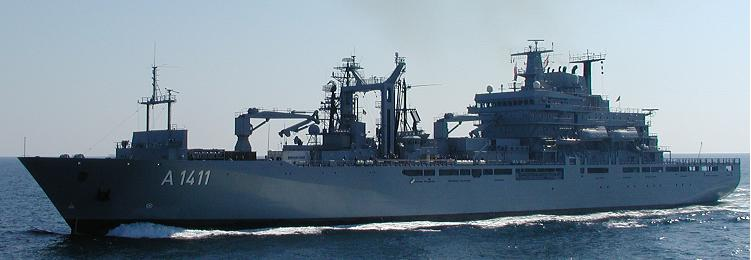
The new Protecteur-class of ships will be based on the German Berlin-class replenishment ship

Two new Protecteur-class auxiliary vessels are under construction, intended to complement Asterix.

== Glossary ==
Displacement	Ship displacement at full load
Propulsion	Number of shafts, type of propulsion system, and top speed generated
Service	The dates work began and finished on the ship and its ultimate fate
Laid down	The date the keel began to be assembled
Launched	The date the ship was launched

== See also ==
- Origins of the Royal Canadian Navy
- History of the Royal Canadian Navy
- List of ships of the Royal Canadian Navy
- Hull classification symbol (Canada)
- His Majesty's Canadian Ship
- List of aircraft of the Royal Canadian Navy

== Bibliography and further reading ==
- Blatherwick, F.J. (1992). Royal Canadian Navy Honours, Decorations, Medals, 1910–1968. FJB Air Publications, New Westminster.
- The Canadian Navy List 1914 to 1945. King's Printer, Ottawa.
- Colledge, J. J.; Warlow, Ben (2006) [1969]. Ships of the Royal Navy: The Complete Record of All Fighting Ships of the Royal Navy from the 15th Century to the Present (3rd Rev ed.). London: Chatham Publishing. ISBN 978-1-86176-281-8. OCLC 67375475.
- Dittmar, F.J.; College, J.J. (1972). British Warships, 1914–1919. Alan, London.
- Douglas, W.A.B.; et al. (2004). No Higher Purpose: The Official Operational History of the Royal Canadian Navy in the Second World War, 1939–1943. Volume II, Part I. Vanwell, St. Catharines.
- Douglas, W.A.B.; et al. (2007). A Blue Water Navy: The Official Operational History of the Royal Canadian Navy in the Second World War – 1943–1945, Volume II, Part 2. Vanwell, St. Catharines.
- Gimblett, Richard H., ed. (2009). The Naval Service of Canada 1910–2010: The Centennial Story. Toronto: Dundurn Press. ISBN 978-1-4597-1322-2.
- Gimblett, Richard H.; Hadley, Michael L., eds. (2010). Citizen Sailors: Chronicles of Canada's Naval Reserve. Toronto: Dundurn Press. ISBN 978-1-55488-867-2.
- Johnston, William; Rawling, William G.P.; Gimblett, Richard H.; MacFarlane, John (2010). The Seabound Coast: The Official History of the Royal Canadian Navy, 1867–1939. Vol. 1. Toronto: Dundurn Press. ISBN 978-1-55488-908-2.
- Macpherson, Ken; Barrie, Ron (2002). The Ships of Canada's Naval Forces 1910–2002 (Third ed.). St. Catharines, Ontario: Vanwell Publishing. ISBN 1-55125-072-1.
- Milner, Marc (2010). Canada's Navy: The First Century (Second ed.). Toronto: University of Toronto Press. ISBN 978-0-8020-9604-3.
- Office of Naval Intelligence (1944). Index to Warships of the British Commonwealth (PDF). US Government Printing Office.
- Tucker, Gilbert (1952). The Naval Service of Canada: Its Official History. Vol 2: Activities on Shore During the Second World War. King's Printer, Ottawa.
