= Naval Large Tugboat =

Royal Canadian Navy tugboat

Class overview
- Builders: Groupe Ocean, L'Isle-aux-Coudres
- Operators: Royal Canadian Navy
- Preceded by: Glen class
- Built: 2020–present
- Planned: 6
- On order: 2
- Completed: 4

General characteristics
- Type: Tugboat
- Length: 24.40 m (80 ft 1 in)
- Beam: 11.25 m (36 ft 11 in)
- Draught: 5.40 m (17 ft 9 in)
- Installed power: 2 × 4,998 hp (3,727 kW) diesel engines
- Propulsion: Azimuth stern drive propulsion
- Speed: 12 knots (22 km/h; 14 mph)
- Crew: 6
- Notes: Bollard pull : 60 t (59 long tons; 66 short tons)

The Naval Large Tugboat is a class of naval tugboat operated by the Royal Canadian Navy. Six Naval Large Tugboats (NLT) are being built by Ocean Industries Inc. of L'Isle-aux-Coudres under the National Shipbuilding Strategy. The first two tugboats will be based at CFB Esquimalt, and last two will be based at CFB Halifax. The steel cutting for the first NLT commenced in September 2020 and the lead ship, CFAV Haro, was launched on 15 July 2022.

== Design and description ==
The Naval Large Tugs, designed by Vancouver based Robert Allan Ltd. and prefixed Canadian Forces Auxiliary Vessel (CFAV), will replace the five Glen-class tugs and the fire and rescue boat CFAV Firebrand which were brought into service in the mid-1970s. The Glen-class tugs which the NLTs are replacing have a bollard pull of 18 metric tons (18 long tons; 20 short tons) and 850 horsepower (630 kW) on each side. The NLTs have much increased power at 60 metric tons (59 long tons; 66 short tons) of bollard pull and Azimuth stern drive propulsion with 4,988 horsepower (3,720 kW) per side. The NLTs will measure 24.40 metres (80 ft 1 in) long overall with a moulded beam of 11.25 metres (36 ft 11 in) and a draught of 5.40 metres (17 ft 9 in). They will be powered by a two MAN 12V175D-MM diesel engines. They will have a maximum speed of 12 knots (22 km/h; 14 mph) and have a crew of six.

== Construction and career ==
On 29 April 2019, Groupe Ocean was awarded a $102 million contract for four tugboats to be built at their shipyard at L'Isle-aux-Coudres as part of the National Shipbuilding Strategy. The build cost of the four NLTs later rose to $121 million. In December 2021, the Government of Canada announced the names for the four ships, Haro, Barkerville, Canso, and Stella Maris. Two of the ships, Haro and Canso commemorate important straits in Canadian waters while Barkerville and Stella Maris commemorate tugboats that were lost or damaged in service in Canadian waters. The steel cutting for the first NLT commenced in September 2020, with main construction beginning in November. They were initially expected to completed in 2022, however, supply chain issues delayed their completion. The lead ship, CFAV Haro, was launched on 15 July 2022. Upon completion, two of the ships, Haro and Barkerville, will serve on the west coast and Canso and Stella Maris will operate on the east coast. At CFB Halifax in February 2026, it was announced that the Government of Canada amended the contract, increasing the contract value by $81 million for a total contract value of $213.45 million with the order of two additional tugboats: CFAV Sansum and CFAV Belle Isle. Sansum is to operate on the west coast with Belle Isle operating on the east coast.

== Ships in class ==
- CFAV Haro (YTB 650)
- CFAV Barkerville (YTB 651)
- CFAV Canso (YTB 652)
- CFAV Stella Maris (YTB 653)
- CFAV Sansum
- CFAV Belle Isle
