= Glen-class tug (1975) =

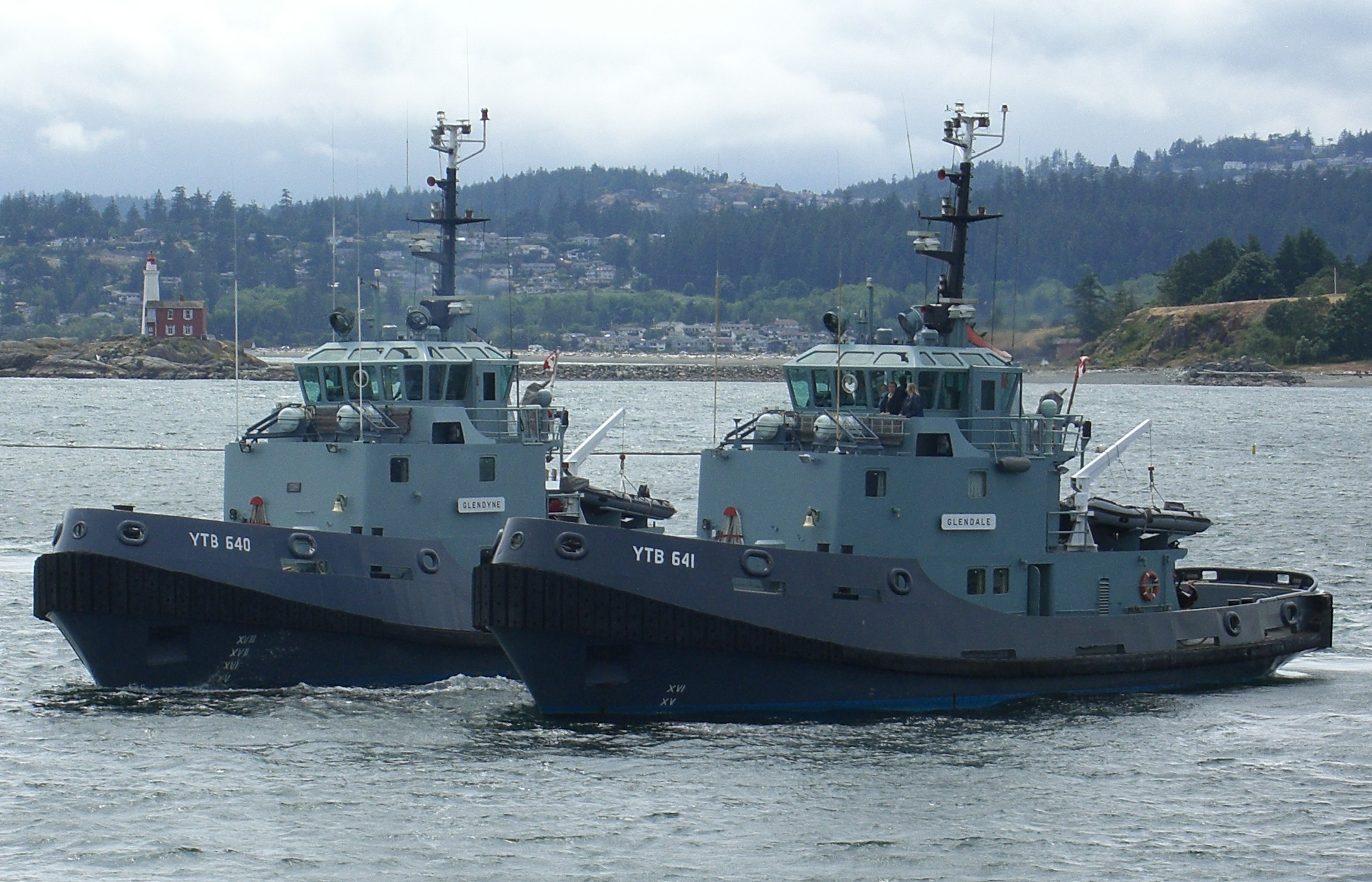
- Glendale and Glendyne at CFB Esquimalt with Fisgard Lighthouse in background

Class overview
- Name: Glen class
- Builders: Yarrow Shipyard, Esquimalt, British Columbia; Georgetown Shipyard, Georgetown, Prince Edward Island
- Operators: Royal Canadian Navy
- Succeeded by: Naval Large Tugboats
- Built: 1975–1977
- In commission: 1975–present
- Completed: 5
- Active: 5

General characteristics as built
- Type: Yard tractor tugs
- Displacement: 255 long tons (259 t)
- Length: 28.2 m (92 ft 6 in)
- Beam: 8.5 m (27 ft 11 in)
- Draught: 4.4 m (14 ft 5 in)
- Propulsion: 2 × Ruston-Paxman diesel engines, 1,300 hp (969 kW); 2 × Voith Schneider cycloidal propellers
- Speed: 11.5 knots (21.3 km/h; 13.2 mph)
- Complement: 6

The Glen-class tug is a class of naval tugboat operated by the Royal Canadian Navy. Constructed in Canada, the class entered service between 1975 and 1977. The five vessels that comprise the class are split between the two major naval bases of the Royal Canadian Navy. The Royal Canadian Navy operated a fleet of tugboats during the Second World War which were also named the Glen class. The vessels of the current Glen class are each named after one of the vessels of the earlier class.

== Description ==
The Glen class is a series of five yard tractor tugboats designed for coastal/harbour use in Canada's major naval bases. The vessels have a standard displacement of 255 long tons (259 t). As built they are 28.2 metres (92 ft 6 in) long with a beam of 8.5 metres (27 ft 11 in) and a draught of 4.4 metres (14 ft 5 in). They are propelled by two Voith Schneider cycloidal propellers turned by two Ruston-Paxman diesel engines rated at 1,300 horsepower (969 kW). This gives them a maximum speed of 11.5 knots (21.3 km/h; 13.2 mph). They initially had a complement of six officers and ratings.

== Ships ==
The five vessels are divided between the two fleets of the Royal Canadian Navy, with three assigned to Maritime Forces Atlantic, based at CFB Halifax and two assigned to Maritime Forces Pacific, homeported at CFB Esquimalt.

Glen class
Name	Hull no.	Builder	Commissioned	Homeport	Status
Glendyne	YTB 640	Yarrow Shipyard, Esquimalt, British Columbia	1975	CFB Esquimalt	In service
Glendale	YTB 641	Yarrows, Esquimalt, British Columbia	1975	CFB Esquimalt	In service
Glenevis	YTB 642	Georgetown Shipyard, Georgetown, Prince Edward Island	1976	CFB Halifax	Refit
Glenbrook	YTB 643	Georgetown Shipyard, Georgetown, Prince Edward Island	16 December 1976	CFB Halifax	Refit
Glenside	YTB 644	Georgetown Shipyard, Georgetown, Prince Edward Island	1977	CFB Halifax	In service

While the Glen-class tugs are equipped for firefighting, the Canadian Forces maintained a pair of dedicated Fire-class fireboats, the 140-ton Firebrand and Firebird, one each in each port. The crews of the fireboats are cross-trained and able to crew a Glen-class vessel in emergencies. However, Firebird on the east coast was taken out of service and prepared for disposal.

== Replacements ==
On 4 December 2012 the Department of National Defence published an enquiry for Canadian shipbuilders interested in building replacements for the Glen-class tugs¸and Fire-class fireboats. A single class would replace both the tugs and the fireboats, and would be operated by civilian crews. The replacement vessels would have water cannons that could be controlled remotely, by a single individual. The replacement vessels would have bollard pull of 40 tons. The replacement vessels would be limited to 33 metres (108 ft 3 in) or less, and limited to a draught of 6 metres (19 ft 8 in) or less. Since their intended role would be harbour duties, they would have limited range and crew berthing capacity.

On 29 April 2019 the Government of Canada announced Ocean Industries of Isle-aux-Coudres, Quebec was awarded the contract to build four tow-tug / rescue vessels to replace both the Fire-class fireboat/tractor tugs and Glen-class yard tugs with delivery expected from 2021 to 2023. Two, Barkerville and Haro, arrived at Victoria on 25 July 2024. Canso and Stella Maris, intended for service in Halifax, have yet to be constructed.

== See also ==
- Ville-class tug
- CFAV Tillicum (YTM 555)
