= CFAV Glendyne =

Royal Canadian Navy tugboat

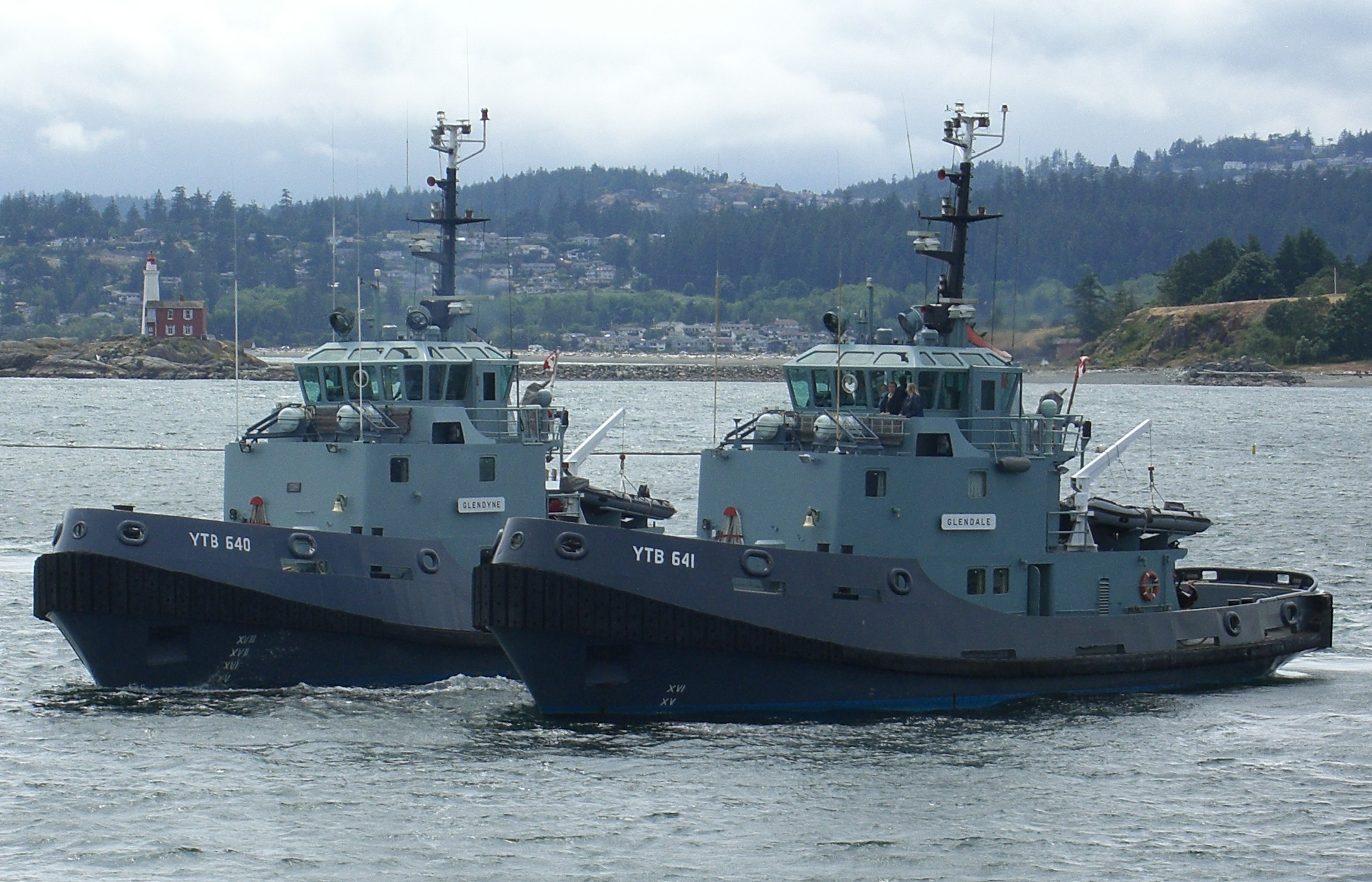
- Glendale and Glendyne at CFB Esquimalt with Fisgard Lighthouse in background

History

Canada
- Name: Glendyne
- Builder: Yarrows, Esquimalt
- Launched: 1975
- Acquired: 8 August 1975
- Homeport: CFB Esquimalt
- Identification: MMSI number: 316013711; Callsign: CGNF
- Status: In active service

General characteristics
- Class & type: Glen-class tugboat
- Displacement: 250 long tons (254 t)
- Length: 28.95 m (95 ft 0 in)
- Beam: 9.29 m (30 ft 6 in)
- Draught: 4.4 m (14 ft 5 in)
- Propulsion: 2 × Ruston-Paxman diesel engines, 1,800 hp (1,342 kW); 2 × Voith Schneider cycloidal propellers
- Speed: 11 knots (20 km/h; 13 mph)
- Complement: 6–10
- Notes: Bollard pull: 19 tons

CFAV Glendyne (YTB 640) is a Glen-class naval tugboat operated by the Royal Canadian Navy. It was built at Yarrow Shipyard in Esquimalt, British Columbia. The ship was launched in 1975 and delivered on 8 August 1975. Attached to Maritime Forces Pacific, the ship is based at CFB Esquimalt.
