= CFAV Glendale =

Royal Canadian Navy tugboat

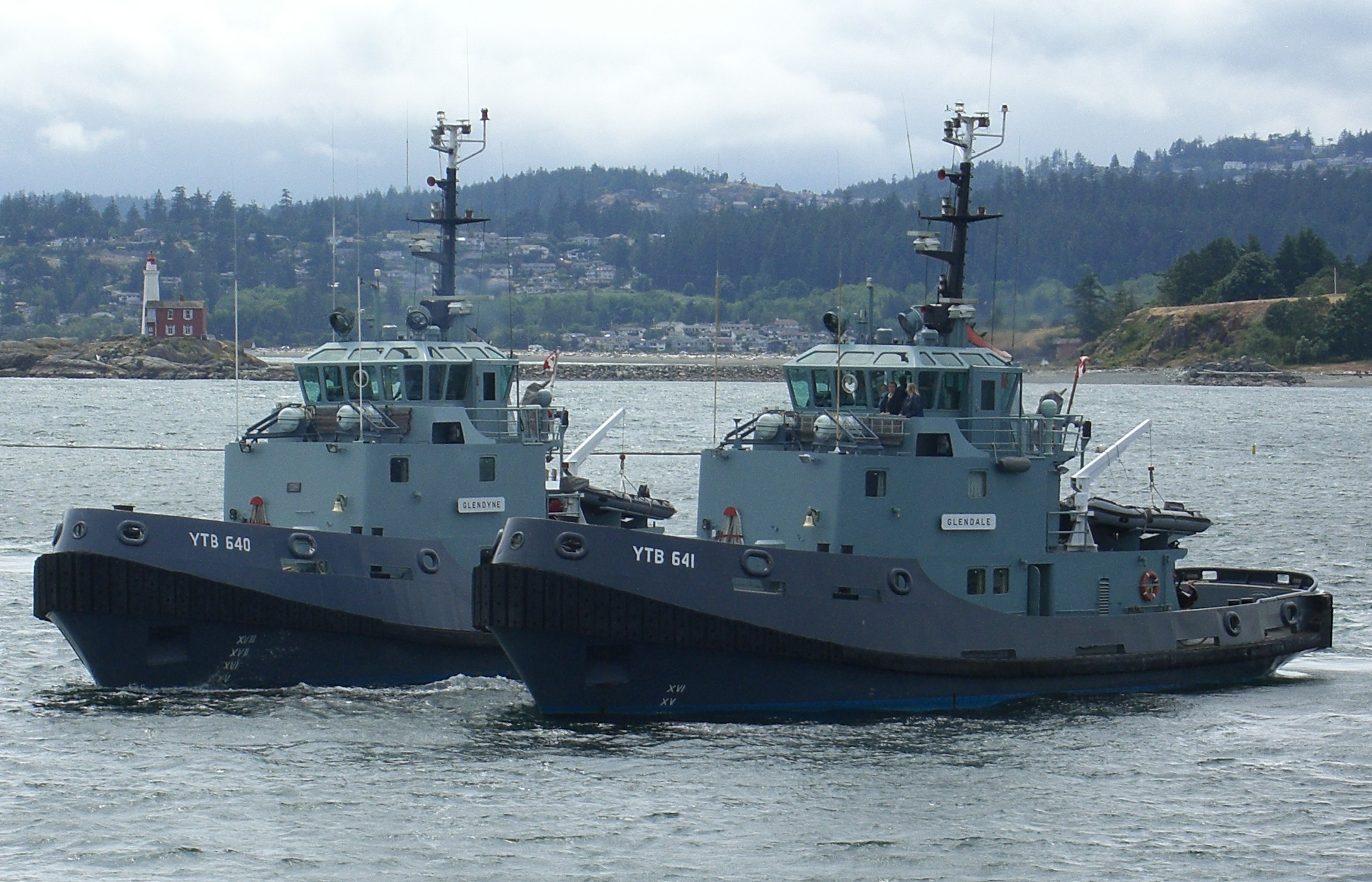
- Glendale and Glendyne at CFB Esquimalt with Fisgard Lighthouse in background

History

Canada
- Name: Glendale
- Builder: Yarrows, Esquimalt
- Launched: 1975
- Acquired: 16 September 1975
- Homeport: CFB Esquimalt
- Identification: MMSI number: 316021279; Callsign: CGQD
- Status: in active service

General characteristics
- Class & type: Glen-class tugboat
- Displacement: 250 long tons (254 t)
- Length: 28.95 m (95 ft 0 in)
- Beam: 9.29 m (30 ft 6 in)
- Draught: 4.4 m (14 ft 5 in)
- Propulsion: 2 × Ruston-Paxman diesel engines, 1,800 hp (1,342 kW); 2 × Voith Schneider cycloidal propellers
- Speed: 11 knots (20 km/h; 13 mph)
- Complement: 6–10
- Notes: Bollard pull: 19 tons

CFAV Glendale (YTB 641) is a Glen-class naval tugboat operated by the Royal Canadian Navy. Built at Yarrow Shipyard, Esquimalt, British Columbia and launched in 1975, the ship was delivered on 16 September 1975. Attached to Maritime Forces Pacific, the ship is based at CFB Esquimalt.
