= Ville-class tug =

Royal Canadian Navy tugboat

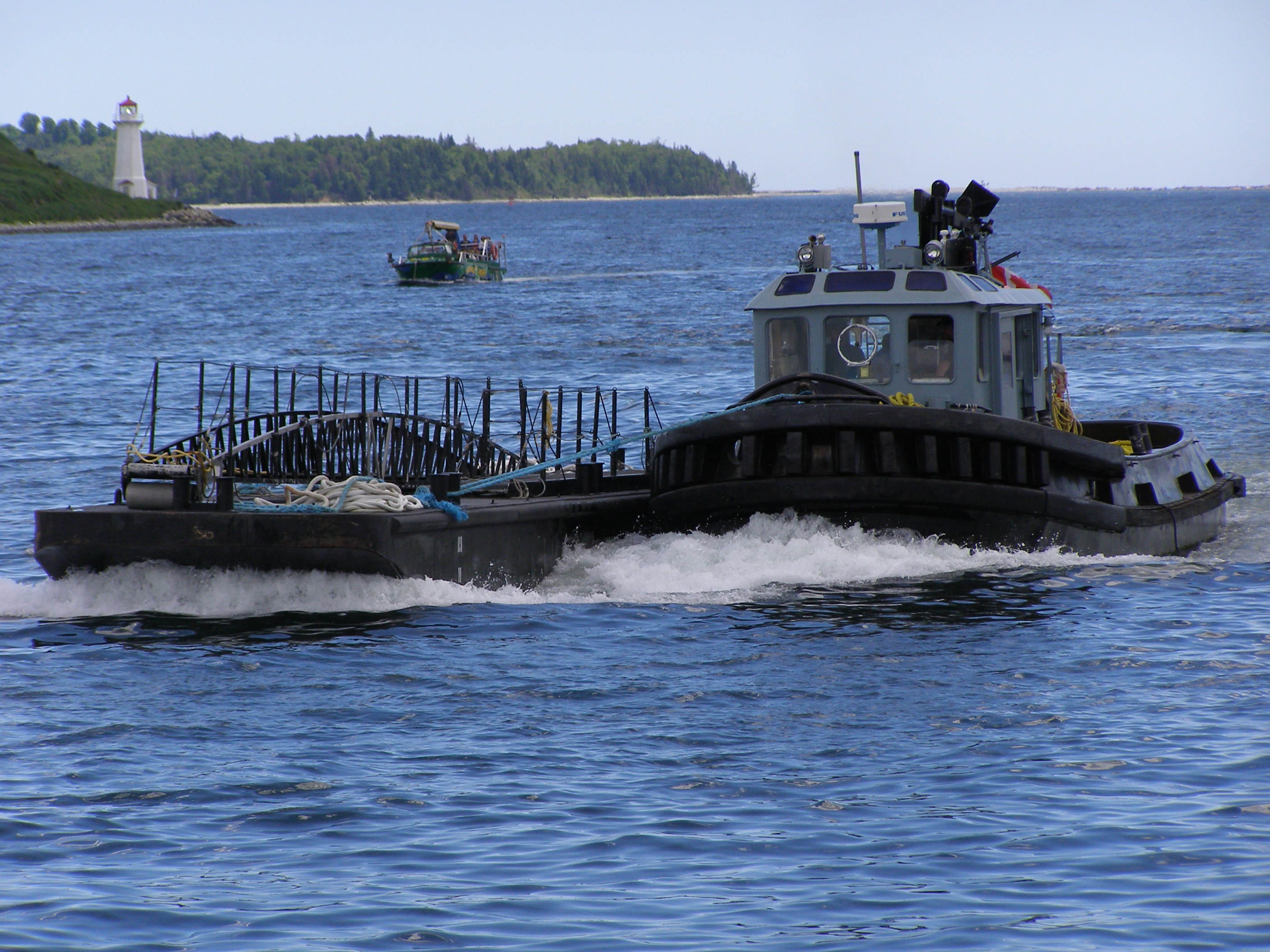
- Ville-class tugboat CFAV Merrickville

Class overview
- Name: Ville class
- Builders: Georgetown Shipyard, Georgetown, Prince Edward Island; Vito Steel, Delta, British Columbia
- Operators: Royal Canadian Navy
- Built: 1974–1975
- In commission: 1975–present
- Completed: 5
- Active: 5

General characteristics
- Type: Tugboat
- Displacement: 45 long tons (46 t)
- Length: 19.5 m (64 ft 0 in)
- Beam: 4.72 m (15 ft 6 in)
- Draught: 2.74 m (9 ft 0 in)
- Installed power: East coast Villes - 1 × Caterpillar 3406 diesel at 365 hp (272 kW); West coast Villes - 1 × Caterpillar D343 rated at 365 hp (272 kW)
- Propulsion: 1 × steerable kort nozzle
- Speed: 9 kn (17 km/h; 10 mph)
- Notes: Bollard pull: 7.5 tons

The Ville-class tug are a class of harbour tugboats employed by the Royal Canadian Navy.

Canada operated a fleet of 17-ton tugs, built during the Second World War which were also called the Ville class. The current vessels are named after those vessels. There is confusion that the current Ville-class design was based on the British Pup-class tugs. The original 17-ton version was based on that design, however the new Villes are an independent design.

== Design ==
The Ville class were designed by the Canadian naval architecture company Robert Allan Ltd as harbour tugs. They have a low-slung shape that is ideal for tight maneuvering and nudging exercises on larger ships. Their kort-nozzle allows for a greater bollard pull however it loses its pull at anything over 10 knots (19 km/h; 12 mph) and loses speed in turns. The Ville class are 13.71 m (45 ft 0 in) long with a beam of 4.72 m (15 ft 6 in) and a draught of 2.74 m (9 ft 0 in).

=== Propulsion ===
Members of the class built on the east coast were given one Caterpillar 3406 diesel engine that provides 365 horsepower (272 kW) and Ville-class tugs built on the west coast were supplied with one Caterpillar D343 diesel engine rated at 365 hp (272 kW). This power is directed towards a steerable kort nozzle which gives the class a speed of 9 knots (17 km/h; 10 mph).

=== Towing ===
The Ville class has a max bollard pull of 7.5 tons, denoting them as small tugboats. The bollard pull measures the amount of pulling or pushing power a ship has.

== Ships ==
Ville-class tugboats
Name	Pennant number	Commissioned	Builder	Stationed
Lawrenceville	YTL 590	1974	Vito Steel & Barge Construction, B.C.	CFB Esquimalt
Parksville	YTL 591	1974	Vito Steel & Barge Construction, B.C.	CFB Esquimalt
Listerville	YTL 592	1974	Georgetown Shipyard, P.E.I.	CFB Halifax
Merrickville	YTL 593	1974	Georgetown Shipyard, P.E.I.	CFB Halifax
Granville	YTL 594	1974	Georgetown Shipyard, P.E.I.	CFB Halifax

== Other auxiliary ships ==
The Royal Canadian Navy operates five other, larger tugboats, the 140-ton CFAV Tillicum, and five 250-ton Glen-class tugs, and one 140-ton Fire-class fireboats. The larger tugs are also split between both coasts.

On 29 April 2019 the Government of Canada announced Ocean Industries of Isle-aux-Coudres, Quebec was awarded the contract to build four tow-tug/rescue vessels to replace both the Fire-class fireboats and Glen-class tugs with delivery expected from 2021 to 2023. The new tugs will be staffed by civilian crews and be restricted to the naval base/yard only.
