= HMCS Oriole =

Royal Canadian Navy sail training ship

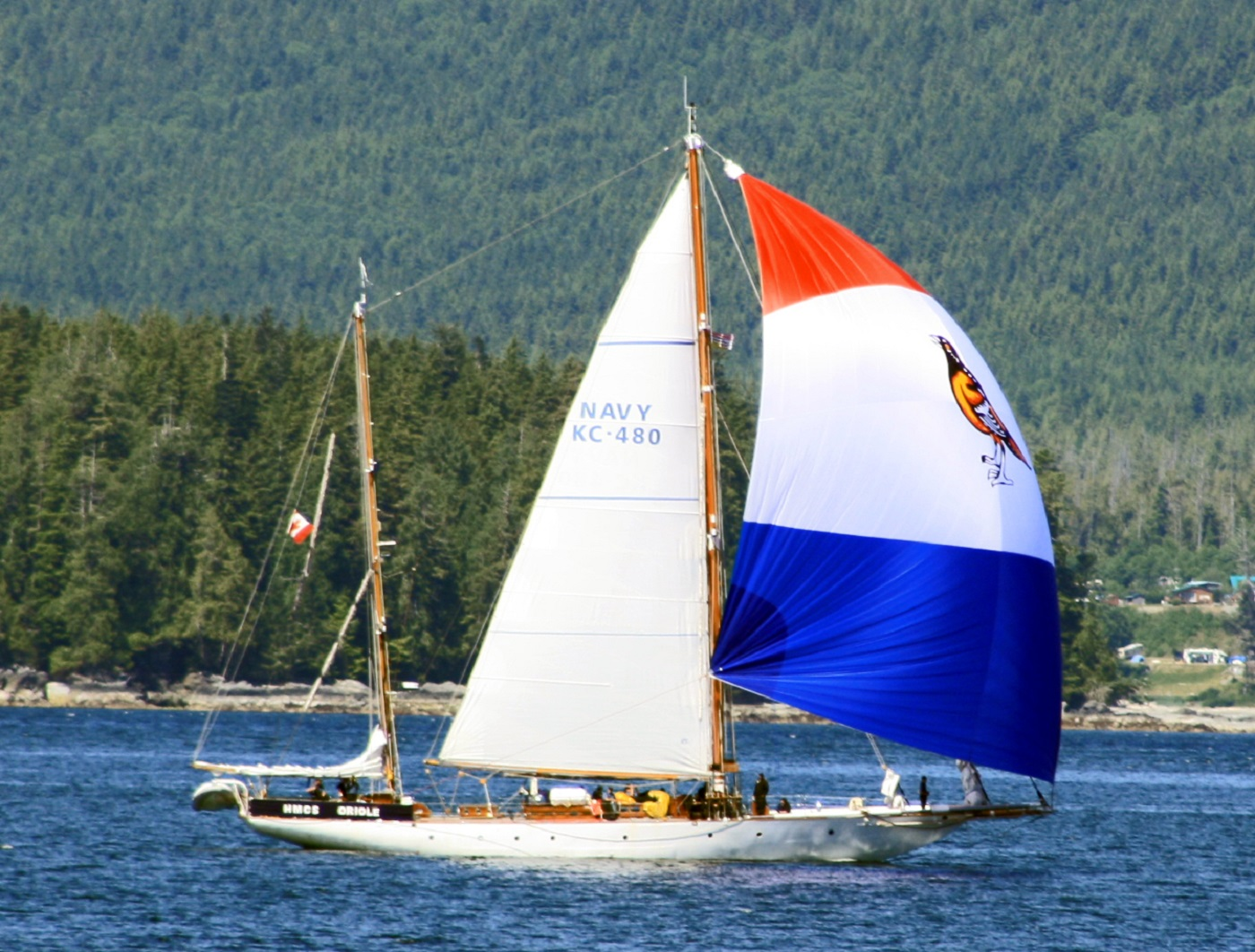
- HMCS Oriole in July 2011

History

Canada
- Name: Oriole
- Namesake: Oriole, Oriolus aurum
- Builder: Dominion Shipbuilding, Toronto; George Lawley & Son, Boston
- Launched: 4 June 1921
- Commissioned: 19 June 1952
- Home port: CFB Halifax
- Identification: MMSI number: 316169000; Callsign: CYWP; Pennant number: YAC 3
- Honours and awards: Dunkirk, 1940
- Status: ship in active service
- Notes: Current Commanding Officer: LCdr Gregg Morris
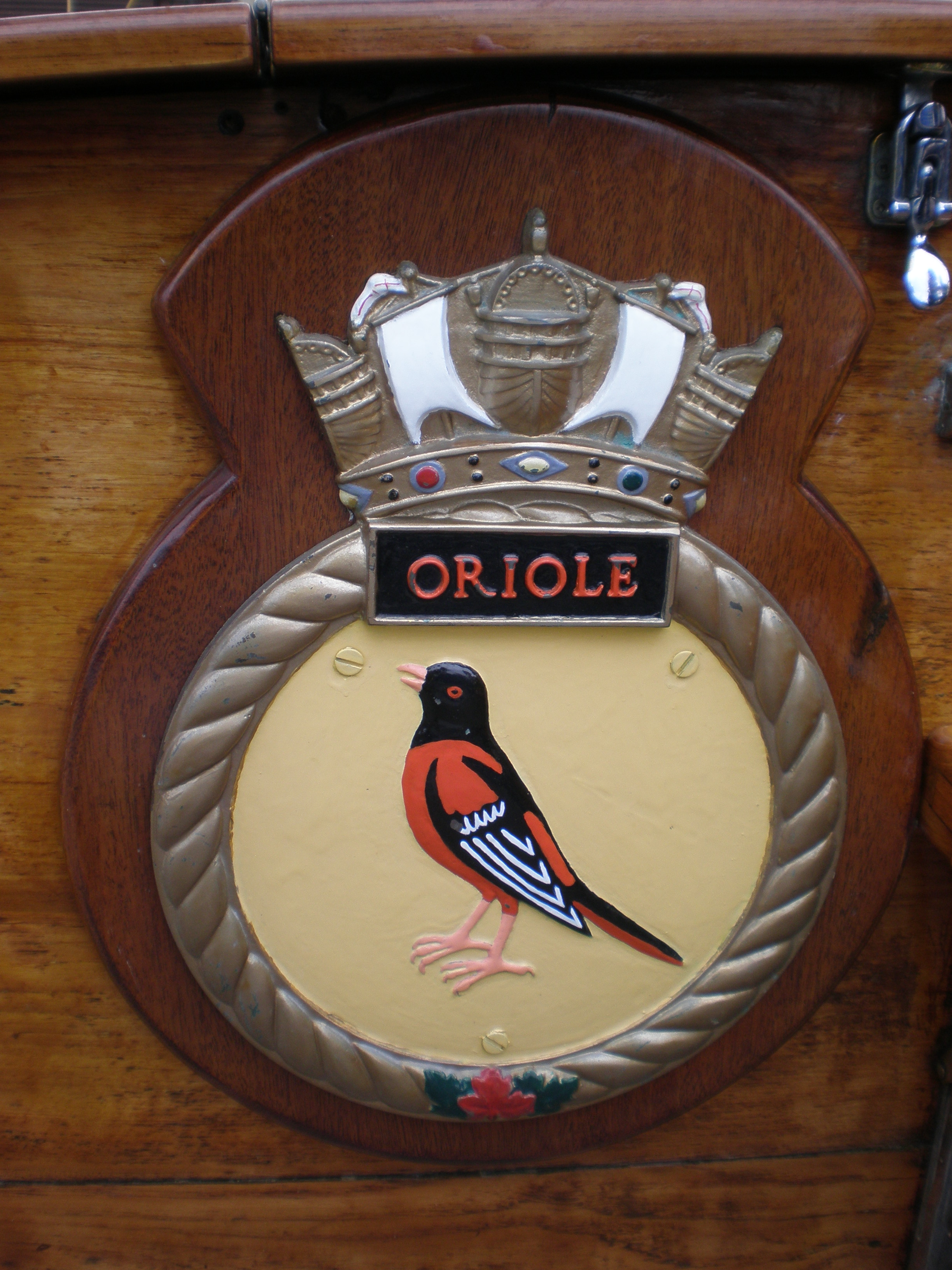
- Badge

General characteristics
- Type: Sail training ketch
- Displacement: 68 long tons (69 t); 92 long tons (93 t) full load
- Length: 102 ft 0 in (31.1 m)
- Beam: 19 ft 0 in (5.8 m)
- Height: 94 ft 0 in (28.7 m)
- Draught: 9 ft 0 in (2.7 m)
- Installed power: Auxiliary engine 165 hp (123 kW) Cummins diesel, 1 shaft
- Propulsion: 11,000 ft^{2} (1,000 m^{2}) of sail
- Sail plan: Marconi rig
- Speed: 8 knots (15 km/h)
- Complement: 6 + 18 trainees

HMCS Oriole is the sail training vessel of the Royal Canadian Navy based at CFB Halifax in Halifax, Nova Scotia. She is a sailing ketch, currently the oldest commissioned vessel in the Royal Canadian Navy, and also the longest serving commissioned ship. Originally the yacht Oriole IV, the vessel was acquired by the Royal Canadian Navy during the Second World War, then returned to private ownership at the end. Oriole IV was reacquired during the Cold War for use on the East Coast of Canada before switching to the West Coast of Canada in 1956. In 2018, the training vessel returned to the East Coast.

== Description ==
Oriole has a standard displacement of 68 long tons (69 t) and a fully loaded displacement of 92 long tons (93 t). The vessel is 102 ft 0 in (31.09 m) long overall with a beam of 19 ft 0 in (5.79 m) and a draught of 9 ft 0 in (2.74 m). The vessel is propelled primarily by 11,000 ft^{2} (1,000 m^{2}) of sail, rigged as a ketch. Her sail plan includes flying sails set on her main and mizen . The height of the mainmast is 94 ft 0 in (28.65 m) and the mizzen mast is 55 ft 2 in (16.81 m). The vessel is equipped with an auxiliary Cummins diesel engine driving one shaft, creating 165 horsepower (123 kW). Oriole has a maximum speed of 8 knots (15 km/h; 9.2 mph) while under power; she can exceed this speed under sail when conditions are right for her. The vessel has a complement of one officer and five ratings, with the capacity for 18 trainees.

== History ==
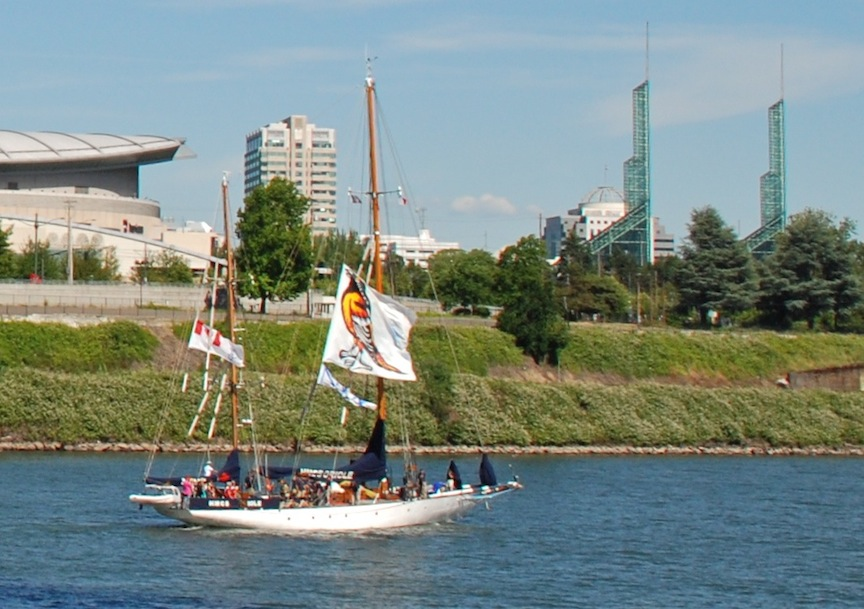
Arriving in Portland, Oregon, for the 2013 Rose Festival

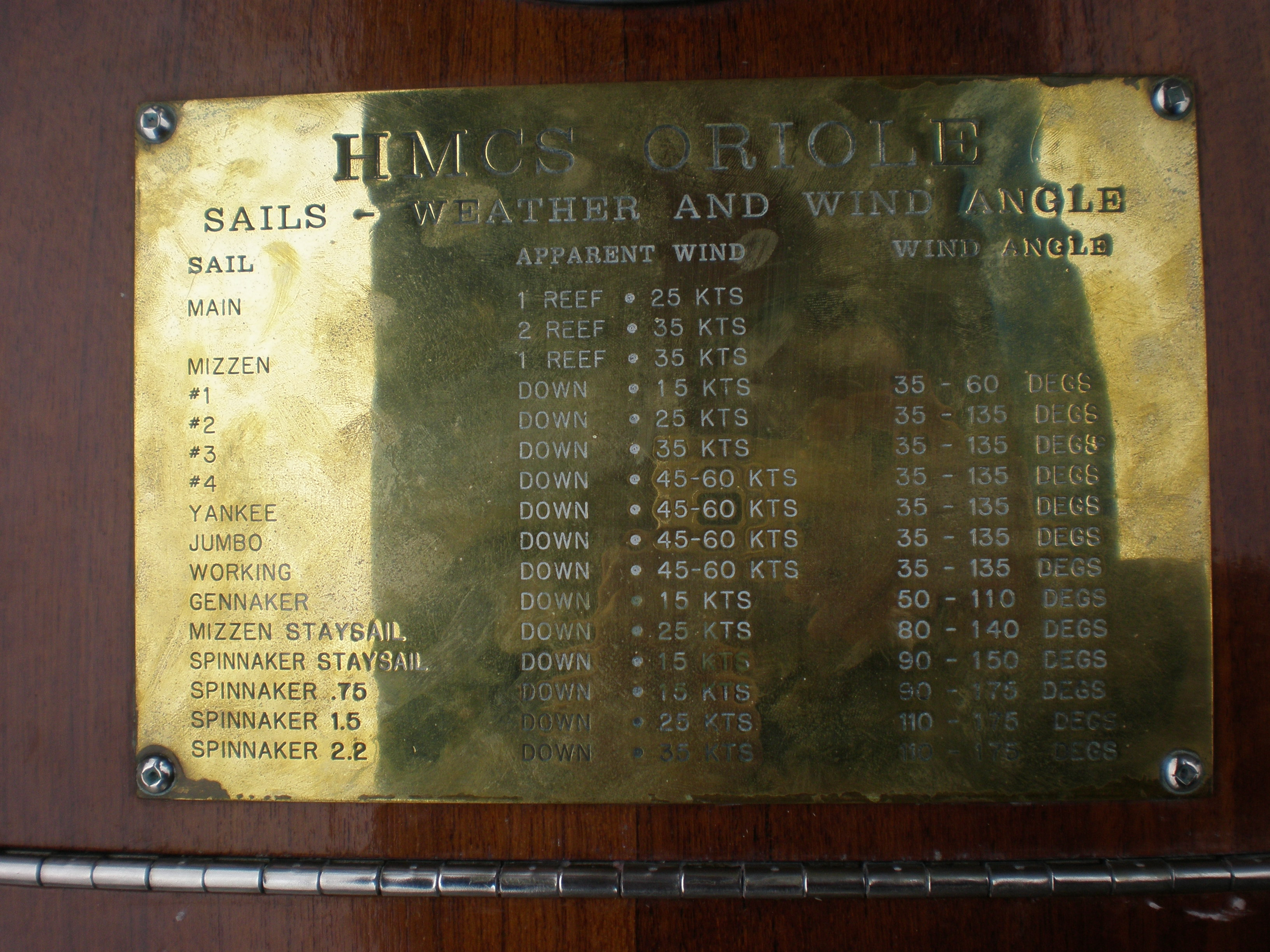
Ship's reference plaque

Oriole was originally laid down as the yacht Oriole IV by Dominion Shipbuilding in Toronto, Ontario, ordered by George H. Gooderham, the Commodore of the Royal Canadian Yacht Club of Toronto. Work was stopped on her construction due to a strike, but the vessel was taken to Neponset, Boston, Massachusetts, where she was completed. The ship was launched on 4 June 1921. The ketch served as the Royal Canadian Yacht Club's flagship from 1924 to 1928.

In 1941, Oriole IV was sold to the Navy League of Canada for use in training Sea Cadets. In 1943, during the Second World War, she was chartered by the Royal Canadian Navy as a training vessel. She was stationed at Sea Cadet Camp Queen Elizabeth (now YMCA Camp Queen Elizabeth) on Beausoleil Island on Georgian Bay during the war.

Following the war, the ship was returned to the Navy League, then she was again chartered by the Navy as a new recruit training vessel in 1950. Oriole IV subsequently moved to Halifax, Nova Scotia, in 1951. Her first year, the ketch was assigned to HMCS Cornwallis before transferring to HMC Dockyard at Halifax for training cruises. She was officially commissioned as HMCS Oriole on 19 June 1952, and two years later, the navy moved her to CFB Esquimalt to become a training vessel attached to the Naval Officer Training Centre. In 1956, she was purchased outright and attached to HMCS Venture at Esquimalt.

In 1984, Oriole returned to the East Coast of Canada, taking part in the 450th anniversary of Jacques Cartier's arrival in Quebec. The vessel participates in the annual Swiftsure Yacht Race on the West Coast of Canada. In March 2017, Oriole sailed for the East Coast of Canada to participate in the Tall Ships Regatta in Quebec and the Maritimes as part of Canada's 150th anniversary celebrations. Following the celebrations, Oriole underwent repairs at Lunenburg, Nova Scotia.

On 29 May 2018, Oriole officially changed homeports, returning to Halifax. From June through September 2018, Oriole deployed to the St. Lawrence River and Great Lakes on a training tour, visiting several Canadian ports. In 2019, the vessel returned to the Great Lakes for its annual three-month training deployment, visiting several ports.

Oriole celebrated her 100th anniversary in 2021 by making a series of port visits in Atlantic Canada.

Oriole is the only Royal Canadian Navy ship that has the unique battle honour, "Dunkirk 1940", granted by perpetuation because she shares the name of a Royal Navy ship that won that honour.

== See also ==
- List of Canadian Navy ships
