= CFAV Glenbrook =

Royal Canadian Navy tugboat

History

Canada
- Name: Glenbrook
- Builder: Georgetown Shipyard, Georgetown, Prince Edward Island
- Launched: 1976
- Acquired: 16 December 1976
- Homeport: CFB Halifax
- Identification: MMSI number: 316015715; Callsign: CGRH
- Status: in active service

General characteristics
- Class & type: Glen-class tugboat
- Displacement: 250 long tons (254 t)
- Length: 28.95 m (95 ft 0 in)
- Beam: 9.29 m (30 ft 6 in)
- Draught: 4.4 m (14 ft 5 in)
- Propulsion: 2 × Ruston-Paxman diesel engines, 1,800 hp (1,342 kW); 2 × Voith Schneider cycloidal propellers
- Speed: 11 knots (20 km/h; 13 mph)
- Complement: 6–10
- Notes: Bollard pull : 19 tons

CFAV Glenbrook (YTB 643) is a Glen-class naval tugboat operated by the Royal Canadian Navy. Built at Georgetown Shipyard, Georgetown, Prince Edward Island, and launched in 1976, the ship was delivered on 16 December 1976. Attached to Maritime Forces Atlantic, the ship is based at CFB Halifax.
