= CFAV Glenevis =

Royal Canadian Navy tugboat

History

Canada
- Name: Glenevis
- Builder: Georgetown Shipyard, Prince Edward Island
- Launched: 1976
- Acquired: 9 August 1976
- Homeport: CFB Halifax
- Identification: MMSI number: 316015716; Callsign: CGQO
- Status: ship in active service

General characteristics
- Class & type: Glen-class tugboat
- Displacement: 250 long tons (254 t)
- Length: 28.95 m (95 ft 0 in)
- Beam: 9.29 m (30 ft 6 in)
- Draught: 4.4 m (14 ft 5 in)
- Propulsion: 2 × Ruston-Paxman diesel engines, 1,800 hp (1,342 kW); 2 × Voith Schneider cycloidal propellers
- Speed: 11 knots (20 km/h; 13 mph)
- Complement: 6-10
- Armament: None
- Notes: Bollard pull : 19 tons

CFAV Glenevis (YTB 642) is a Glen-class naval tugboat operated by the Royal Canadian Navy. Built at Georgetown Shipyard, Georgetown, Prince Edward Island, and launched in 1976, the ship was delivered on 9 August 1976. Attached to Maritime Forces Atlantic, the ship is based at CFB Halifax.
