= CFAV Tillicum =

Royal Canadian Navy tugboat

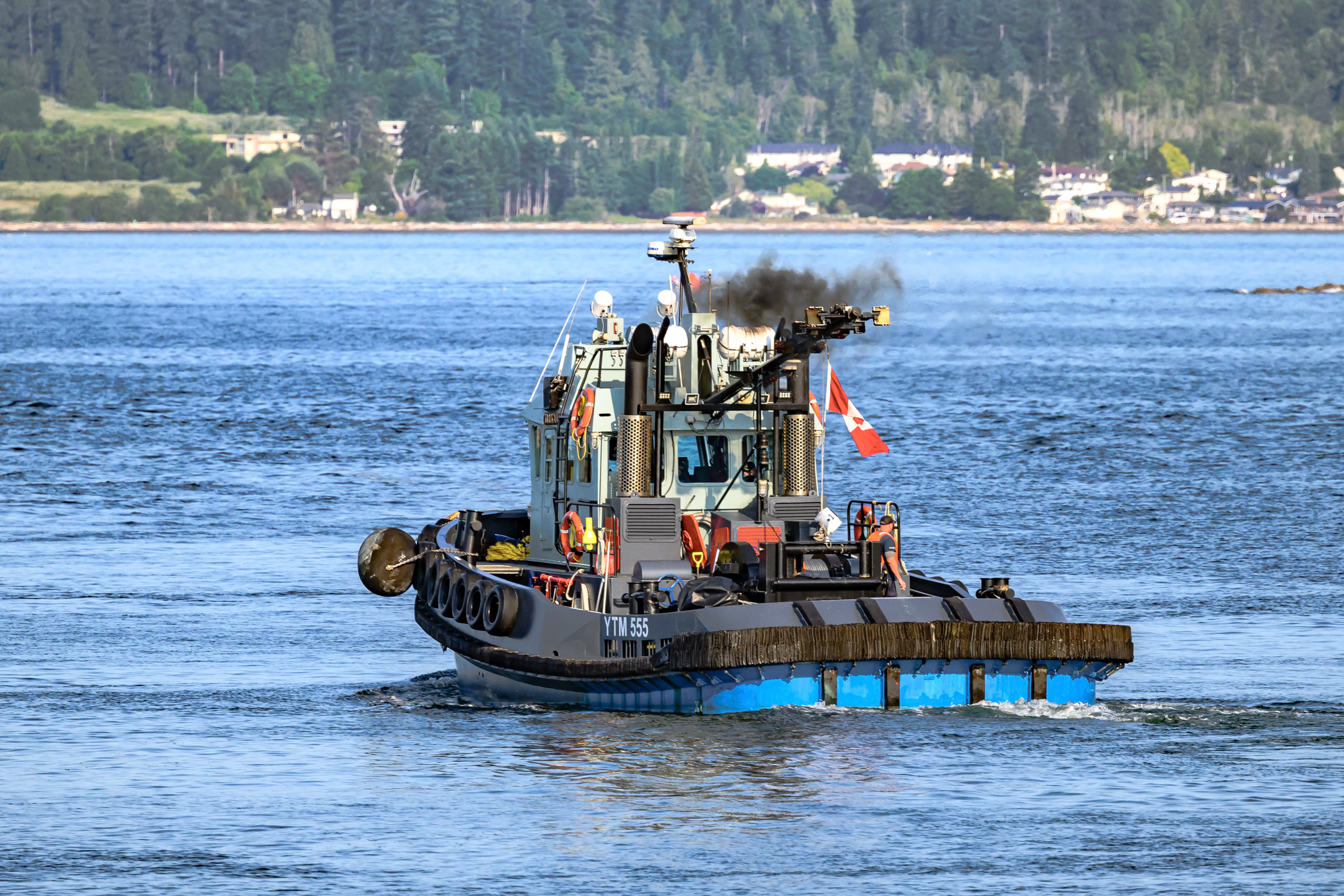
- CFAV Tillicum leaving Ogden Point for homeport at CFB Esquimalt, British Columbia, Canada.

History

Canada
- Name: Tillicum
- Operator: King's Harbour Master
- Builder: Rivtow Industries (West Coast Manly Shipyards), Vancouver
- Launched: 1990
- Christened: Wedge Island
- Completed: Island Defender
- Acquired: Mar 15 1997
- Recommissioned: 1997 with QHM
- Home port: CFB Esquimalt
- Identification: YTM 555

General characteristics
- Displacement: 140 tons
- Length: 21.03m
- Beam: 7.28m
- Installed power: 8V149 Detroit Diesel 635bhp x 2
- Propulsion: 2 × kort nozzles
- Notes: Bollard pull: 16 tons

CFAV Tillicum (YTM 555) is a harbour tug of the King's Harbour Master. She is stationed at CFB Esquimalt, on Vancouver Island.

The King's Harbour Master operates ten other tugboats, five 45-ton Ville-class tugs and five 250-ton Glen-class tugs, and two 140-ton Fire-class fireboats.

The Ville-class tugs rotate their kort nozzle for steering. Tillicum's nozzles are fixed and she uses 4 conventional rudders for steering.
