= CFAV Glenside =

Royal Canadian Navy tugboat

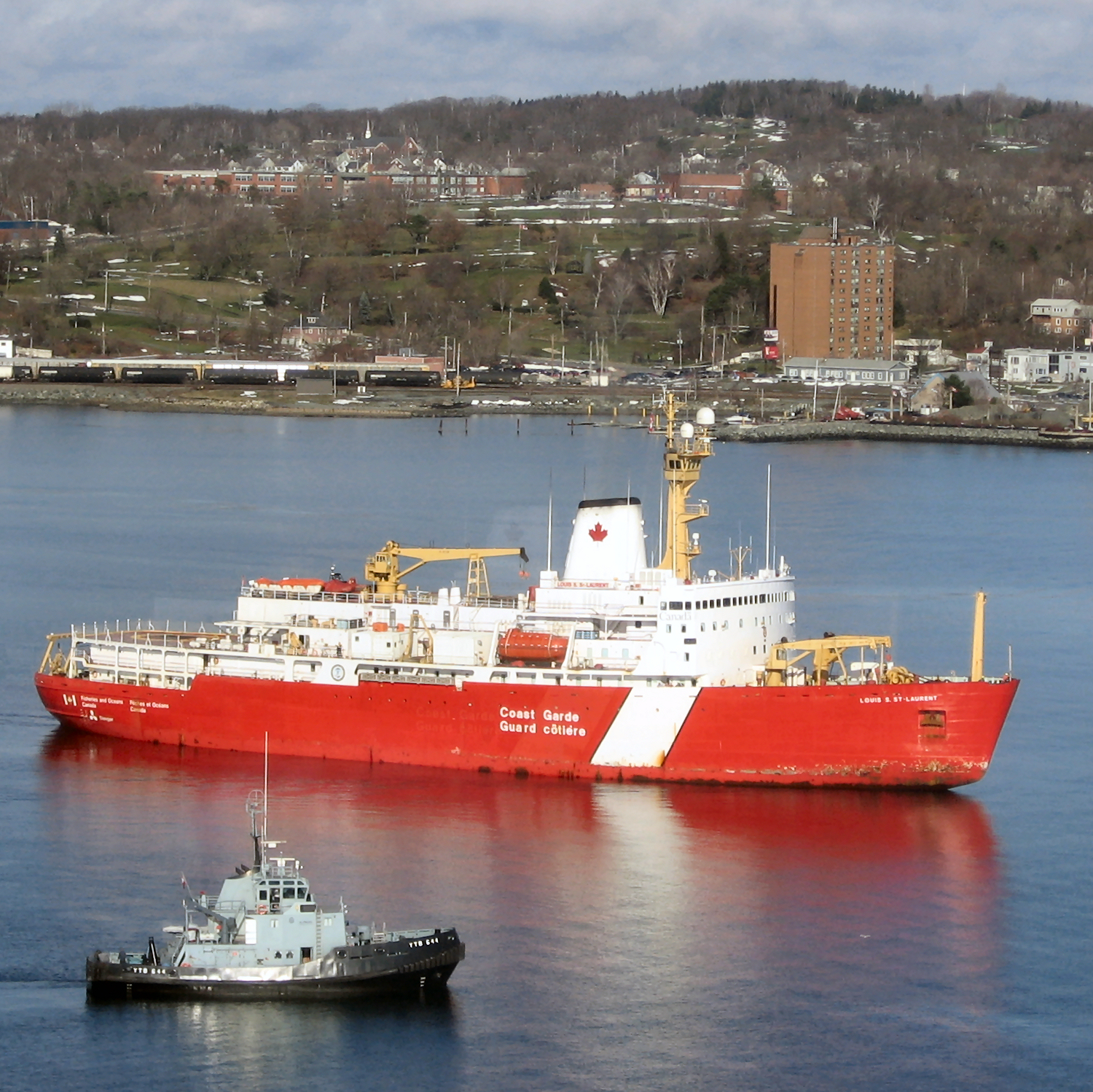
- CFAV Glenside (foreground) with CCGS Louis S. St-Laurent in Halifax Harbour

History

Canada
- Name: Glenside
- Builder: Georgetown Shipyard, Prince Edward Island
- Launched: 1977
- Acquired: 20 May 1977
- Homeport: CFB Halifax
- Identification: MMSI number: 316015713; Callsign: CGTK
- Status: ship in active service

General characteristics
- Class & type: Glen-class tugboat
- Displacement: 250 long tons (254 t)
- Length: 28.95 m (95 ft 0 in)
- Beam: 9.29 m (30 ft 6 in)
- Draught: 4.4 m (14 ft 5 in)
- Propulsion: 2 × Ruston-Paxman diesel engines, 1,800 hp (1,342 kW); 2 × Voith Schneider cycloidal propellers
- Speed: 11 knots (20 km/h; 13 mph)
- Complement: 6-10
- Armament: None
- Notes: Bollard pull : 19 tons

CFAV Glenside (YTB 644) is a Glen-class naval tugboat operated by the Royal Canadian Navy. Built at Georgetown Shipyard, Georgetown, Prince Edward Island, and launched in 1977, the ship was delivered on 20 May 1977. Attached to Maritime Forces Atlantic, the ship is based at CFB Halifax.
