= CFB Esquimalt =

Naval base in British Columbia, Canada

Canadian Forces Base Esquimalt
- Base des Forces canadiennes Esquimalt
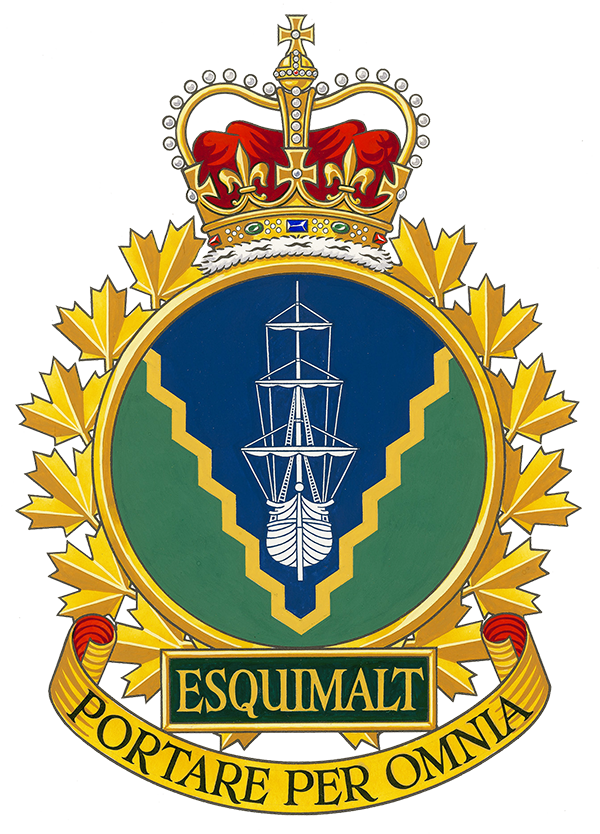
- Base Badge
- Active: 1860 - present
- Country: Canada
- Branch: Royal Canadian Navy
- Type: Naval Base
- Part of: Maritime Forces Pacific
- Motto: Portare per omnia (Latin: Support for all
- Website: https://www.canada.ca/en/navy/corporate/our-organization/structure/marpac/marpac-units.html

Commanders
- Base Commander: Capt(N) Kevin Whiteside
- Ceremonial chief: CPO 1 Susan Frisby

Aircraft flown
- Multirole helicopter: CH-148 Cyclone

CFB Esquimalt
- MARPACHQ
- Esquimalt, British Columbia, Canada
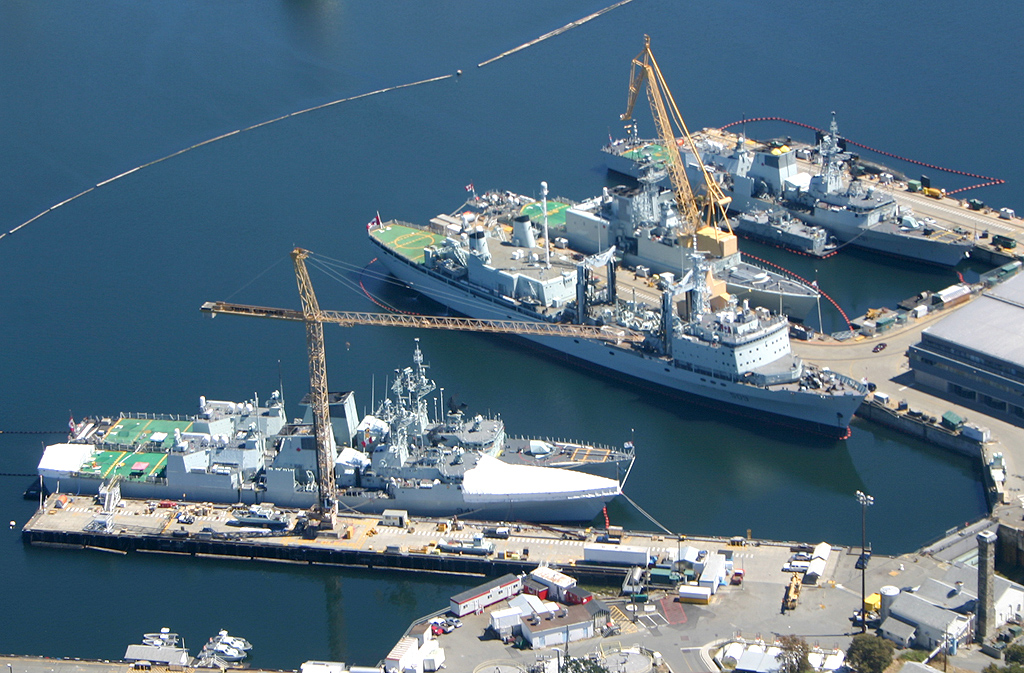
- Canadian naval ships docked at CFB Esquimalt

Site information
- Type: Naval base
- Controlled by: Canadian Armed Forces

Location
- Coordinates: 48°25′52″N 123°25′54″W

Site history
- Built: 1860 to present
- In use: 1860 –present
- Battles/wars

National Historic Site of Canada
- Official name: Esquimalt Naval Sites National Historic Site of Canada
- Designated: 1995

Garrison information
- Garrison: Royal Canadian Navy

Canadian Forces Base Esquimalt (CFB Esquimalt) is the Royal Canadian Navy's Pacific Coast naval base and home port to Maritime Forces Pacific and Joint Task Force Pacific Headquarters. As of 2018, 4,411 military personnel and 2,762 civilians work at CFB Esquimalt. It is located in the very south of British Columbia.

Location of the base

== Geography ==
The base occupies approximately 41 km^{2} (10,000 acres) at the southern tip of Vancouver Island on the Strait of Juan de Fuca, in the municipality of Esquimalt, adjacent to the western limit of the provincial capital, Victoria.

== Facilities ==
CFB Esquimalt comprises facilities that include Naden (formerly HMCS Naden), His Majesty's Canadian (HMC) Dockyard Esquimalt, Fleet Maintenance Facility – Cape Breton (FMF CB), a Fire Fighting and Damage Control School, the Naval Officer Training Centre (NOTC) Venture, and extensive housing including 716 personnel married quarters at nine sites such as Belmont Park, WorkPoint, and Royal Roads.

The present dockyard and dry dock, known as HMC Dockyard Esquimalt, dates to the Royal Navy's Esquimalt Royal Navy Dockyard (1842–1905) and was the Royal Navy's Pacific Station until 1911. Today it serves as the Royal Canadian Navy headquarters in the Pacific.

Locations
Name	Location	Unit	Lodger Units
Albert Head RTA	Metchosin	4th Ranger Patrol Group, Advanced Naval Capabilities Unit	
Arundel Castle	North Saanich	443 Maritime Helicopter Squadron	
CFAD Rockypoint	Metchosin		
CFMETR Nanoose	Nanoose Bay	Canadian Forces Maritime Experimental and Test Ranges	
Colwood	Colwood	Fleet Diving Unit (Pacific), DCTF Galiano	
Heal's Range	Highlands		
HMC Dockyard	Esquimalt	Maritime Forces Pacific, FMF Cape Breton	
HMCS Malahat	Victoria	HMCS Malahat	
Mary Hill RTA	Metchosin		
Naden	Esquimalt	Base Administration	
Signal Hill	Esquimalt		
Workpoint	Esquimalt	NOTC Venture	

Logistical Support
Name	Location	Unit	Lodger Units
Gen Currie Armoury	Victoria	Canadian Scottish Regiment (Princess Mary's), 5th (BC) Field Artillery Regiment, RCA	
CFRC Det Victoria	Victoria	Canadian Forces Recruitment Group	
LGen Ashton Armoury	Saanich	39 Service Battalion, 11 (Victoria) Field Ambulance	12 Military Police Platoon, 39 Signal Regiment
Nanaimo Military Camp	Nanaimo	Canadian Scottish Regiment (Princess Mary's), 5th (BC) Field Artillery Regiment, RCA	39 Signal Regiment

== Operational and support units ==
Major units of the base are:

- Maritime Forces Pacific
  - Naval Security Team
- Joint Task Force Pacific
- Campus Pacific
- Fleet Diving Unit (Pacific)
- 443 Maritime Helicopter Squadron
- Canadian Forces Health Services Centre (Pacific)
- Naval Provost Marshal (Pacific)
- 5th (British Columbia) Field Artillery Regiment, RCA
- The Canadian Scottish Regiment
- 11 Service Battalion
- 4th Canadian Rangers Patrol Group
- Acoustic Data Analysis Centre
- Regional Cadet Support Unit (Pacific)

== Historic site ==
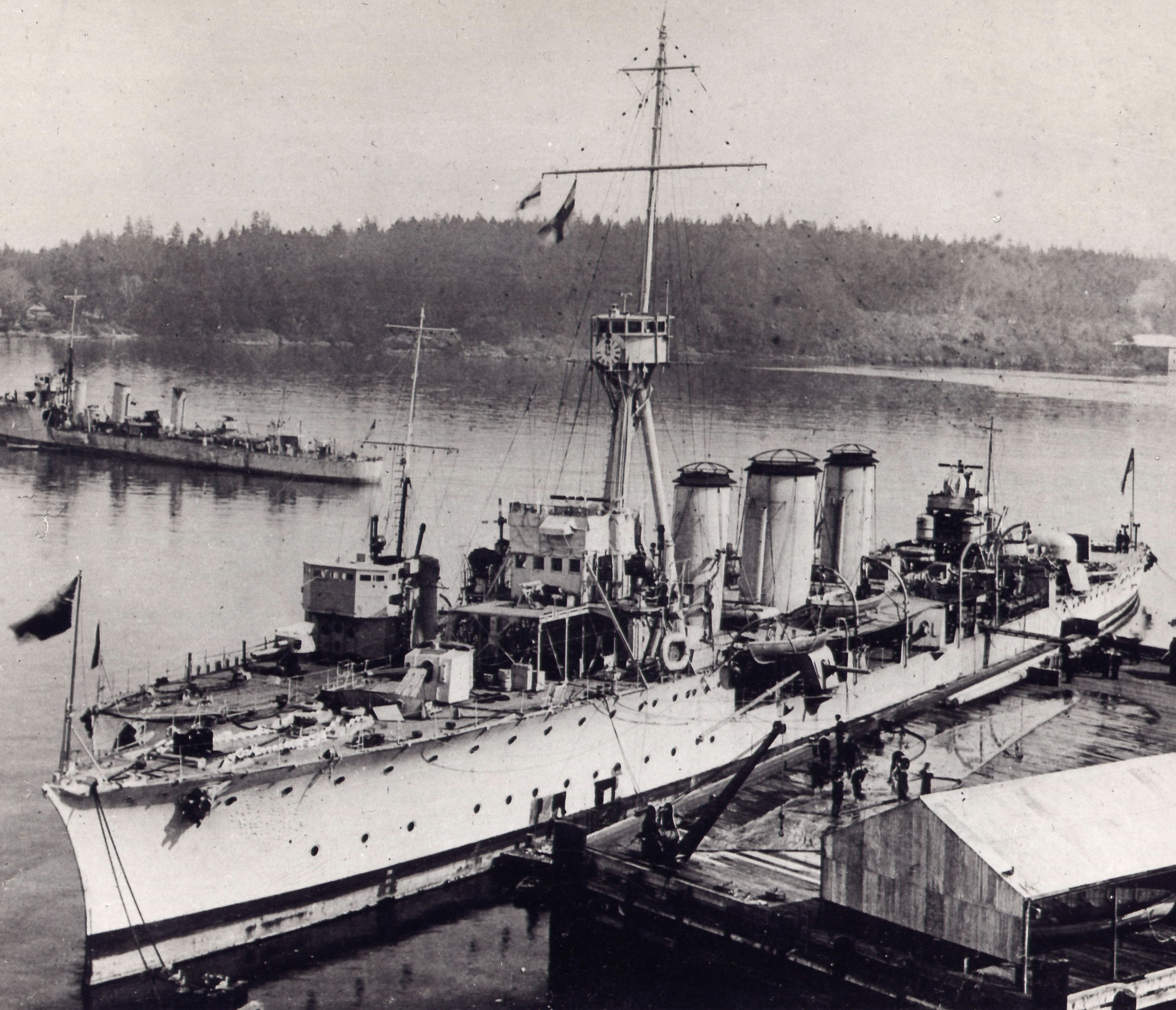
HMCS Aurora, HMCS Patriot, and HMCS Patrician at Esquimalt in 1921.

Due to their significance in Canadian naval history, four sites at CFB Esquimalt (the Dockyard, the former Royal Navy Hospital, the Veterans' Cemetery, and the Cole Island Magazine) have been designated the Esquimalt Naval Sites National Historic Site of Canada.

== Ships ==
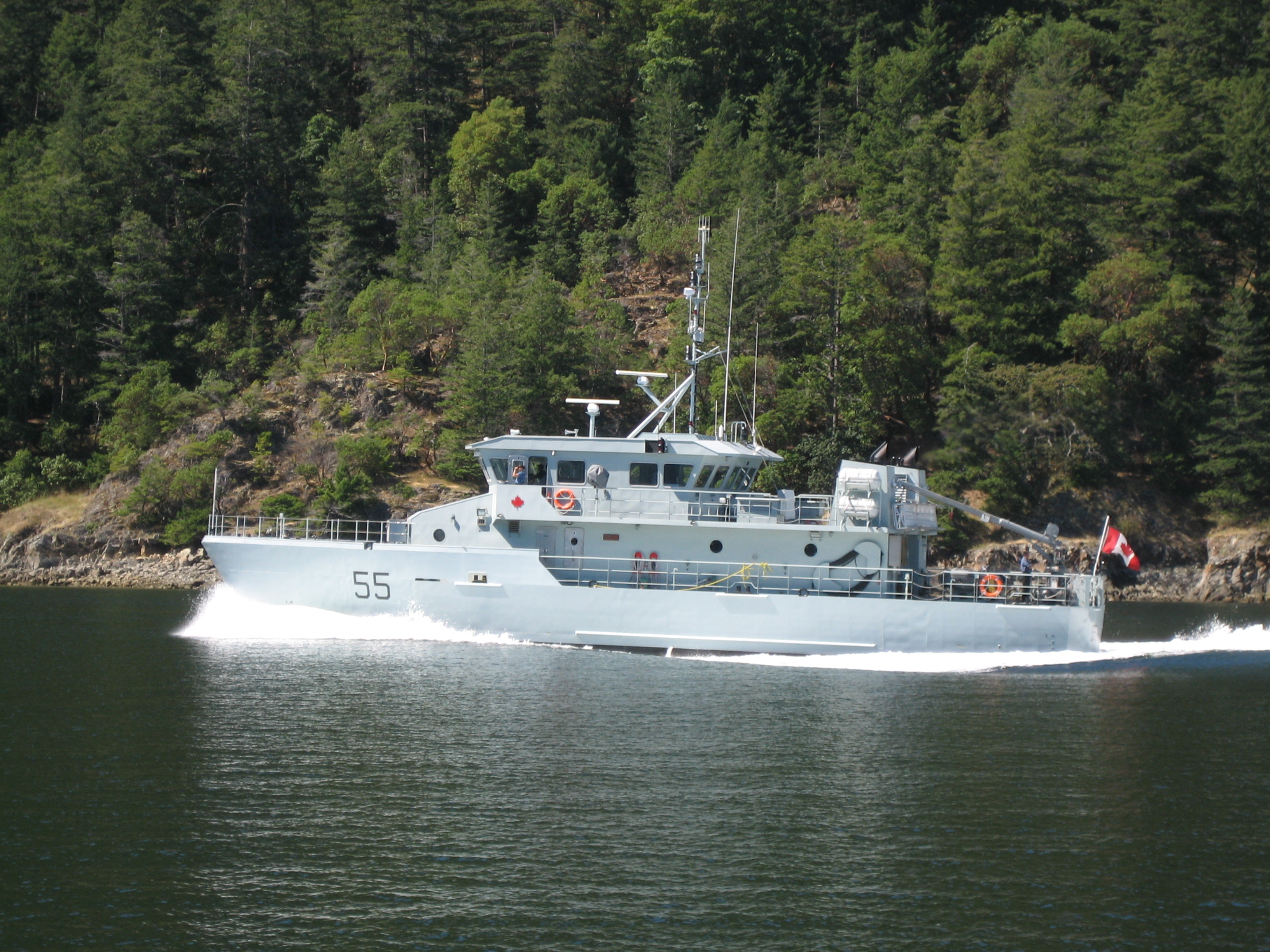
Orca of the Orca-class patrol vessels cruises among the Gulf Islands, 1 August 2007.

In March 2025, CFB Esquimalt services the following ships assigned to Canadian Fleet Pacific

- Halifax-class patrol frigates
  - HMCS Vancouver (FFH 331)
  - HMCS Regina (FFH 334)
  - HMCS Calgary (FFH 335)
  - HMCS Winnipeg (FFH 338)
  - HMCS Ottawa (FFH 341)
- Harry DeWolf-class offshore patrol vessels
  - HMCS Max Bernays
  - Planned 2026 HMCS Robert Hampton Gray
- Victoria-class patrol submarines
  - HMCS Victoria (SSK 876)
  - HMCS Corner Brook (SSK 878)
  - HMCS Chicoutimi (SSK 879)
- Auxiliary vessels
  - CFAV Tillicum (YTM 555), tugboat
  - Fire-class fireboat
    - CFAV Firebrand (YTR 562), fireboat
  - Ville-class tugs
    - CFAV Lawrenceville (YTL 590), tugboat
    - CFAV Parksville (YTL 591), tugboat
  - Glen-class tugs
    - CFAV Glendyne (YTB 640), tugboat
    - CFAV Glendale (YTB 641), tugboat
- Orca-class patrol craft training tender
  - Orca (PCT 55)
  - Raven (PCT 56)
  - Caribou (PCT 57)
  - Renard (PCT 58)
  - Wolf (PCT 59)
  - Grizzly (PCT 60)
  - Cougar (PCT 61)
  - Moose (PCT 62)

== Architecture ==
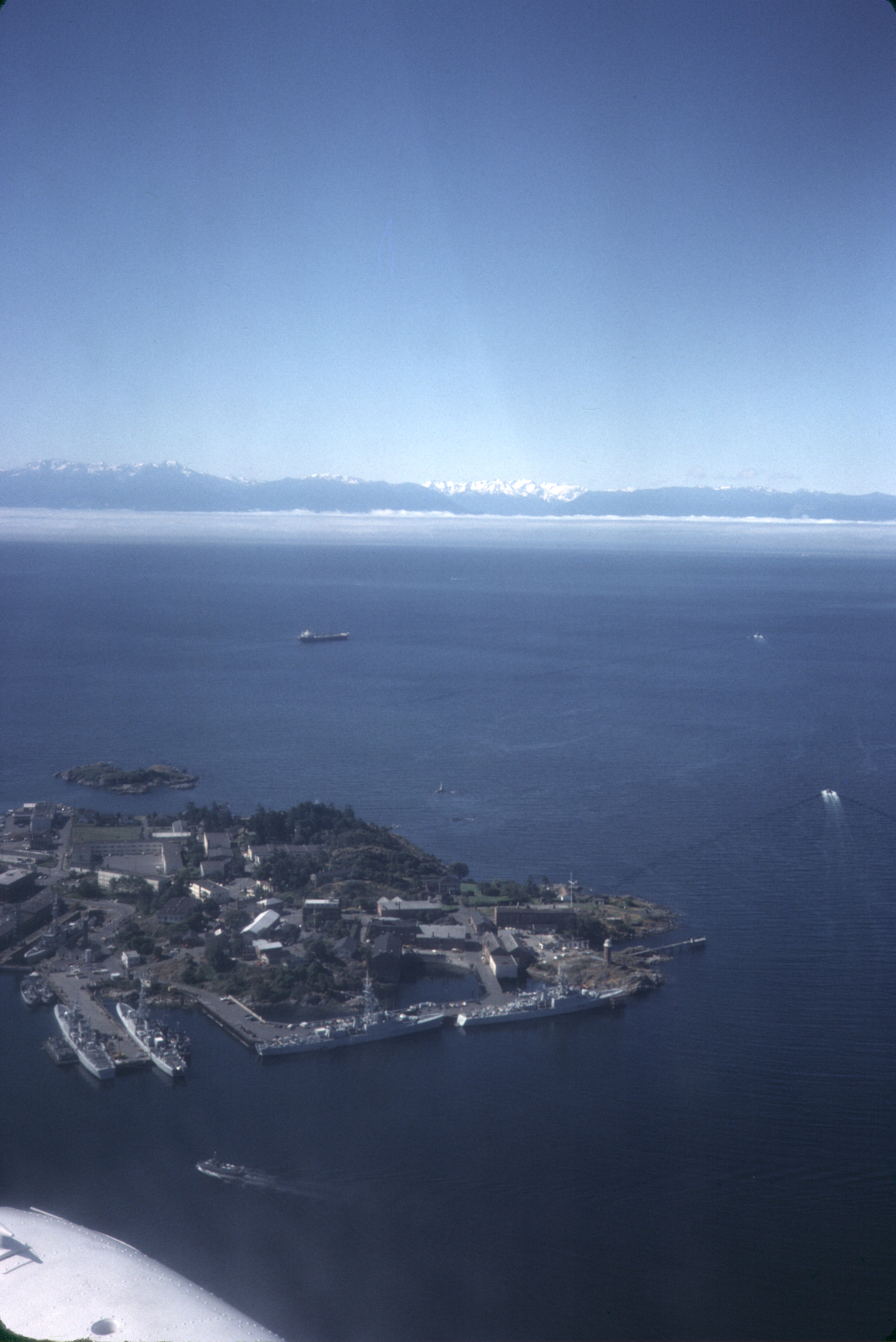
CFB Esquimalt on Vancouver Island, in the background the Olympic Peninsula.

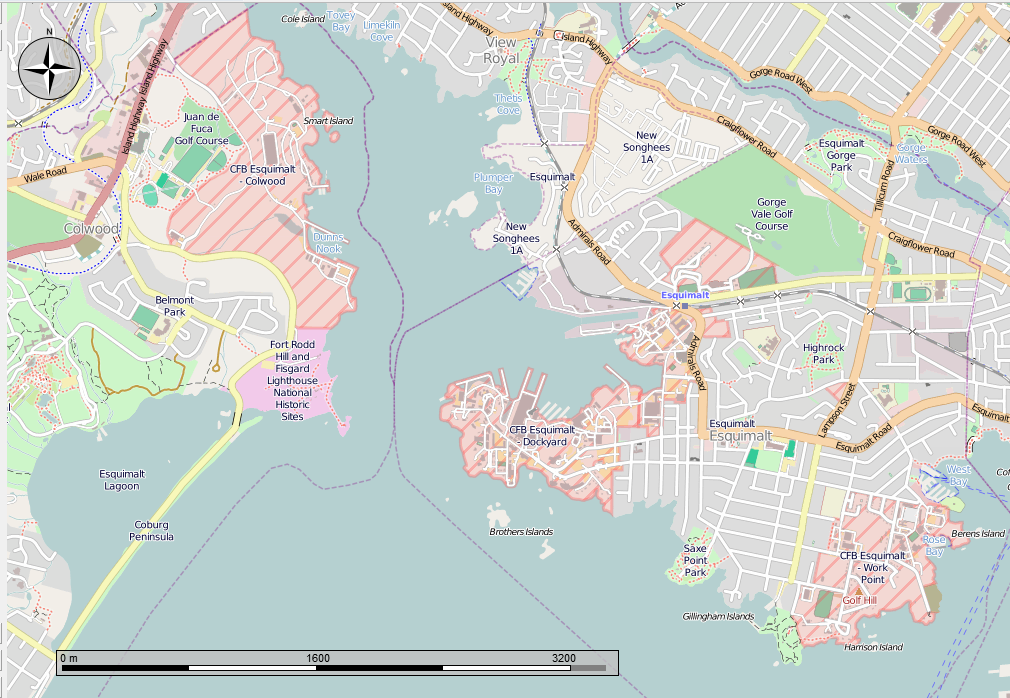
Map showing the three areas of the base.

CFB Esquimalt contains several recognized and classified federal heritage buildings on the Register of the Government of Canada Heritage Buildings.

- Colwood Site
  - Guard House Building 38 Recognized – 2002
  - Belmont Road Main Gatehouse BEL 13 Recognized – 2000
  - Cow Barn / Dairy RR6 Recognized – 2000
  - Gatehouse Lodge RR8 Recognized – 2000
  - Grant Block, Building 24 Recognized – 1990
  - Gymnasium RR22 Recognized – 2000
  - Hatley Castle Classified – 1986
  - Nixon Block RR24A Recognized – 2000
  - Stable / Garage RR4 Recognized – 2000
  - Swimming Pool RR22A Recognized – 2000
- Dockyard
  - Admiral's Residence, former Naval Storekeeper's Residence, Building D101 Classified – 1991
  - Aldergrove Building DY 199 Recognized – 2001
  - Bickford Tower, Building D118 Recognized – 1988
  - Clothing / Receiving Stores, Building D211 Recognized – 1991
  - Cordage / Furniture Stores, Building D80 Recognized – 1991
  - Dry Dock Pumphouse, Building D175 Recognized – 1991
  - Electrical Shop Building DY 141 Recognized – 2001
  - Engineer's Residence, Building D1 Recognized – 1991
  - Factory, Building 51 Recognized – 1991
  - Guard House Building D214 Recognized – 1991
  - Main Office, Building D70 Recognized – 1991
  - Oil Stores Building D83 Recognized – 1991
  - Ordnance Stores, Building D77 Recognized – 1991
  - Pump House, Graving Dock No. 1 Recognized – 1991
  - Royal Navy Prison, Building D26 Recognized – 1991
  - Rum / Salt Meats Stores, Building D75-D76 Recognized – 1991
  - Sail Loft / Oil Stores, Building D109 Recognized – 1991
  - Shipwrights' Shed / Spar Shed, Building D113 Recognized – 1991
  - Stone Frigate Building D38 Recognized – 1991
  - Transformer House, Graving Dock No. 11 Recognized – 1991
  - Veterans' Cemetery Chapel Recognized – 1996
  - Warehouse Building D85 Recognized – 1986
  - Fleet Maintenance Facility Cape Breton, Buildings D250 & D252 Recognized – 1991; Final Construction Completed – 2020
- Naden
  - Administration Block, Building 37 Recognized – 1990
  - Administration Office, former Offices of the Officer-in-Charge, Building 5 Recognized – 1991
  - Catholic Chapel, Building 35 Recognized – 1990
  - Communications School, Building 67 Recognized – 1991
  - Drill Hall Building 33-33A-33B Recognized – 1991
  - Gunnery School, former Building 50 Recognized – 1991
  - Nelles Block, Building 34 Recognized – 1994
  - Officer's Ward / Base Museum, Building 20 Recognized – 1990
  - Protestant Chapel Building 39 Recognized – 1990
  - Radar Training Building 92A Recognized – 2006
  - Stores / Museum Warehouse, Building 29 Recognized – 1990
  - Torpedo School, former Building 2 Recognized – 1991
  - Trades Training Building 92 Recognized – 2006
- Signal Hill
  - Armament Artificer's and Sergeant's Quarters, former Building 522 Recognized – 1991
  - Gun Emplacement, Building 578 Recognized – 1990
  - Private Married Quarters, former Building 523 Recognized – 1991
  - Reserve Ordnance Stores, former Building 508 Recognized – 1991
- Work Point Barracks
  - Administration Building 1020 Recognized – 1991
  - Artillery Barracks, Building 1075 Recognized – 1991
  - Barracks Building 1004 Recognized – 1991
  - Work Point Guard House Recognized – 2011

The Institute for Stained Glass in Canada has documented the stained glass at the Multi-Faith Naval Chapel and the stained glass at the Old Naval and Garrison Church (1866), now known as St Paul's Anglican.

== Esquimalt Naval and Military Museum ==
Esquimalt Naval and Military Museum
- Esquimalt Naval and Military Museum CFB Esquimalt (Canada)
- Location: HMCS Naden, Naden Museum Square, Building 37, Esquimalt, British Columbia
- Coordinates: 48°26′10″N 123°25′15″W
- Website: http://www.navalandmilitarymuseum.org

CFB Esquimalt Naval & Military Museum is at HMCS Naden. Building 20 (c. 1891), part of Naden Museum Square is a Municipal Heritage Property. Building 37 (c. 1889) part of the Naden Museum Square is also a Municipal Heritage Property and is also on the Canadian Register of Historic Places. HMCS Naden was named after the Dominion Government Ship Naden, which was commissioned as a tender for the Royal Naval College of Canada from 1918 to 1922 for training in sail. The museum is affiliated with: Canadian Museums Association (CMA), Canadian Heritage Information Network (CHIN), Organization of Military Museums of Canada (OMMC) and Virtual Museum of Canada.

== Other facilities ==
The Lookout is the base newspaper, which covers local, national and international news with specific interest to Navy and Canadian Forces members and family issues.

Other properties that are part of CFB Esquimalt include the Albert Head training area near Albert Head, Metchosin, located approximately 30 km (19 mi) by road southwest of downtown Victoria. It occupies approximately 88 hectares (220 acres), four of which are developed as training facilities. Fort Albert Head was established in the late 1800s along with Fort Rodd Hill and other installations, to provide shore defence for the Strait of Juan de Fuca and Victoria Harbour. The training area is used for Regular and Reserve Force training throughout the year and was previously home to the Regional Cadet Instructor School (Pacific) that trained Canadian Forces Cadet Instructors Cadre (CIC) Branch that deliver the cadet program. Albert Head currently houses the British Columbia Patrol Company of the 4th Canadian Rangers Patrol Group, training facilities for the Naval Tactical Operations Group, as well as a cadet summer training centre: Albert Head CTC. Canadian Forces Maritime Experimental Test Range at Nanoose Bay is also part of CFB Esquimalt. The facility provides non-explosive technical testing of sonobuoys, torpedoes and other equipment. Canadian Forces Ammunition Depot (CFAD) Rocky Point store excess ammunition for Maritime Forces Pacific and provides maintenance for missiles and torpedoes. The grounds are also used for by Albert Head CTC for survival training. Naval Radio Section Aldergrove in the Fraser Valley houses transmitting and receiving equipment for long-distance communications. Also, the CFB Esquimalt Base Fire Hall & Emergency Response Centre was founded to provide services to CFB Esquimalt and the civil community in the way of fire intervention and emergency response.

== Economic facts ==
- CFB Esquimalt contributes about $760 million (in 2023) into the local community annually.
- CFB Esquimalt is the largest community employer.
- CFB Esquimalt provides 7,866 jobs in the community.
- CFB Esquimalt spends locally 770,847,000 dollars annually.

== See also ==
- Naval Operations Branch

=== Historical background ===
- Royal Roads Military College 1940–1995
