= Maritime Forces Pacific =

Canadian Navy unit for fleet training and readiness in the Pacific

- Forces maritimes du Pacifique
- Active: 1910–present
- Country: Canada
- Branch: Royal Canadian Navy
- Size: 7500 personnel
- Garrison/HQ: CFB Esquimalt
- Motto: Ready aye ready
- Website: canada.ca/en/navy/corporate/our-organization/structure/marpac.html

Commanders
- Current commander: RAdm David Patchell
- Commander of Canadian Fleet Pacific: Commodore Blair Brown
- Commodore-in-Chief (Pacific Fleet): Princess Anne, The Princess Royal

In the Canadian Armed Forces, Maritime Forces Pacific (MARPAC, French: Forces maritimes du Pacifique, FMAR(P)) is responsible for the fleet training and operational readiness of the Royal Canadian Navy in the Pacific Ocean. It was once referred to as Canadian Pacific Station.

The commander of Maritime Forces Pacific (Comd MARPAC) is also the commander of Joint Task Force Pacific (Comd JTFP), holding the rank of rear- admiral. Comd JTFP is responsible for all Canadian Forces operations (such as search and rescue or disaster aid) in British Columbia and its adjacent territorial waters. Reporting to the commander is the commander of Canadian Fleet Pacific (COMCANFLTPAC), holding the rank of commodore. This officer commands Canadian Fleet Pacific (CANFLTPAC), and is responsible for the operation and readiness of all warships, auxiliaries and support vessels.

== MARPAC facilities ==
MARPACHQ is at CFB Esquimalt in Esquimalt, British Columbia, near Victoria.

- HMCS Naden
- NOTC Venture

Whiskey 601 is the regularly used name for an often used naval weapons exercise area off the west coast of Canada. The area's official title was "W-601". The name was usually shortened to "Whiskey" by sailors in the Royal Canadian Navy. Whiskey 601 was notorious for rough seas and bad weather. Whiskey 601 was decommissioned as an exercise area in the 1990s.

== MARPAC units ==
- Canadian Fleet Pacific
  - Frigates
    - HMCS Vancouver (FFH 331)
    - HMCS Regina (FFH 334)
    - HMCS Calgary (FFH 335)
    - HMCS Winnipeg (FFH 338)
    - HMCS Ottawa (FFH 341)
  - Submarines
    - HMCS Victoria (SSK 876)
    - HMCS Corner Brook (SSK 878)
    - HMCS Chicoutimi (SSK 879)
  - Arctic offshore patrol vessel
    - HMCS Max Bernays (AOPV 432)
  - Patrol and training vessels
    - Orca-class patrol vessel
- CFB Esquimalt
- Fleet Maintenance Facility Cape Breton
- Fleet Diving Unit (Pacific)
- Naden Band of the Royal Canadian Navy
- Naval Officers Training Centre Venture
- Naval Training Development Centre (Pacific)
- CFAD Rocky Point
- Naval Radio Section Aldergrove
- Canadian Forces Maritime Experimental and Test Ranges

The RCAF unit 443 Maritime Helicopter Squadron is part of 12 Wing Shearwater but is headquartered at Patricia Bay near CFB Esquimalt and works closely with MARPAC. The squadron provides the onboard helicopter detachments for CANFLTPAC ships.

After World War II prior to Unification in 1968 the RCN's Pacific Command assignments:

- Fleet squadrons
  - Second Canadian Escort Squadron – assigned with escort destroyers
  - Second Canadian Minesweeping Squadron – minesweepers paid off 1960s or as training vessels in 1990s
  - Fourth Canadian Escort Squadron – assigned with (escort) frigates
  - Special Duties – assigned maintenance ship, trainer submarine HMCS Grilse and training ship HMCS Oriole
- Naval air squadrons
  - VU-32 Utility Squadron – assigned various fixed-wing and rotary aircraft:
    - Grumman TBF Avenger – anti-submarine (A/S) patrol
    - Beechcraft Expeditor – navigation training and short-range transport
    - De Havilland Canada built Grumman Tracker CS2F – A/S patrol
    - Lockheed Silver Star – jet trainers
    - Douglas Dakota – utility transport and other roles
    - Bell Twin Huey – assigned after Unification in 1970–1971

== See also ==
- Maritime Forces Atlantic
