= Bollard pull =

Measure of a watercraft's pulling power

Bollard pull is a conventional measure of the pulling (or towing) power of a watercraft. It is defined as the force (usually in tonnes-force or kilonewtons (kN)) exerted by a vessel under full power, on a shore-mounted bollard through a tow-line, commonly measured in a practical test (but sometimes simulated) under test conditions that include calm water, no tide, level trim, and sufficient depth and side clearance for a free propeller stream. Like the horsepower or mileage rating of a car, it is a convenient but idealized number that must be adjusted for operating conditions that differ from the test. The bollard pull of a vessel may be reported as two numbers, the static or maximum bollard pull – the highest force measured – and the steady or continuous bollard pull, the average of measurements over an interval of, for example, 10 minutes. An equivalent measurement on land is known as drawbar pull, or tractive force, which is used to measure the total horizontal force generated by a locomotive, a piece of heavy machinery such as a tractor, or a truck, (specifically a ballast tractor), which is utilized to move a load.

Bollard pull is primarily (but not only) used for measuring the strength of tugboats, with the largest commercial harbour tugboats in the 2000-2010s having around 60 to 65 short tons-force (530–580 kN; 54–59 tf) of bollard pull, which is described as 15 short tons-force (130 kN; 14 tf) above "normal" tugboats. The worlds strongest tug since its delivery in 2020 is Island Victory (Vard Brevik 831) of Island Offshore, with a bollard pull of 477 tonnes-force (526 short tons-force; 4,680 kN). Island Victory is not a typical tug, rather it is a special class of ship used in the petroleum industry called an Anchor Handling Tug Supply vessel.

For vessels that hold station by thrusting under power against a fixed object, such as crew transfer ships used in offshore wind turbine maintenance, an equivalent measure "bollard push" may be given.

== Background ==
Unlike in ground vehicles, the statement of installed horsepower is not sufficient to understand how strong a tug is – this is because the tug operates mainly in very low or zero speeds, thus may not be delivering power (power = force × velocity; so, for zero speeds, the power is also zero), yet still absorbing torque and delivering thrust. Bollard pull values are stated in tonnes-force (written as t or tonne) or kilonewtons (kN).

Effective towing power is equal to total resistance times velocity of the ship.

$P_E=R_T \times V$

Total resistance is the sum of frictional resistance, $R_F$, residual resistance, $R_R$, and air resistance, $R_A$.

$R_F= \frac{1}{2} \times C_F \times \rho_w \times V_w^2 \times A_s$

$R_R= \frac{1}{2} \times C_R \times \rho_w \times V_w^2 \times A_s$

$R_A= \frac{1}{2} \times C_A \times \rho_a \times V_a^2 \times A_a$

Where:

$\rho_w$ is the density of water
$\rho_a$ is the density of air
$V_w$ is the velocity of (relative to) water
$V_a$ is the velocity of (relative to) air
$C_F$ is resistance coefficient of frictional resistance
$C_R$ is resistance coefficient of residual resistance
$C_A$ is resistance coefficient of air resistance (usually quite high, >0.9, as ships are not designed to be aerodynamic)
$A_s$ is the wetted area of the ship
$A_a$ is the cross-sectional area of the ship above the waterline

== Measurement ==
Values for bollard pull can be determined in two ways.

=== Practical trial ===
Figure 1: bollard pull trial under ideal (imaginary) conditions

This method is useful for one-off ship designs and smaller shipyards. It is limited in precision - a number of boundary conditions need to be observed to obtain reliable results. Summarizing the below requirements, practical bollard pull trials need to be conducted in a deep water seaport, ideally not at the mouth of a river, on a calm day with hardly any traffic.

- The ship needs to be in undisturbed water. Currents or strong winds would falsify the measurement.
- The static force that intends to move the ship forward must only be generated by the propeller discharge. If the ship were too close to a wall, water could rebound back, creating a propulsive wave. This would falsify the measurement.
- The ship must be in deep water. If there were any ground effect, the measurement would be falsified. The same holds true for propeller walk.
- Water salinity must have a well-defined value, as it influences the specific weight of the water and thereby the mass moved by the propeller per unit of time.
- The geometry of the towing line must have a well-defined value. Ideally, one would expect it to be exactly horizontal and straight. This is impossible in reality, because
  - the line falls into a catenary due to its weight;
  - the two fixed points of the line, being the bollard on shore and the ship's towing hook or cleat, may not have the same height above water.
- Conditions must be static. The engine power, the heading of the ship, the conditions of the propeller discharge race and the tension in the towing line must have settled to a constant or near-constant value for a reliable measurement.
- One condition to watch out for is the formation of a short circuit in propeller discharge race. If part of the discharge race is sucked back into the propeller, efficiency decreases sharply. This could occur due to a trial that is performed in too shallow water or too close to a wall.

See Figure 2 for an illustration of error influences in a practical bollard pull trial. Note the difference in elevation of the ends of the line (the port bollard is higher than the ship's towing hook). Furthermore, there is the partial short circuit in propeller discharge current, the uneven trim of the ship and the short length of the tow line. All of these factors contribute to measurement error.

Figure 2: bollard pull trial under real conditions

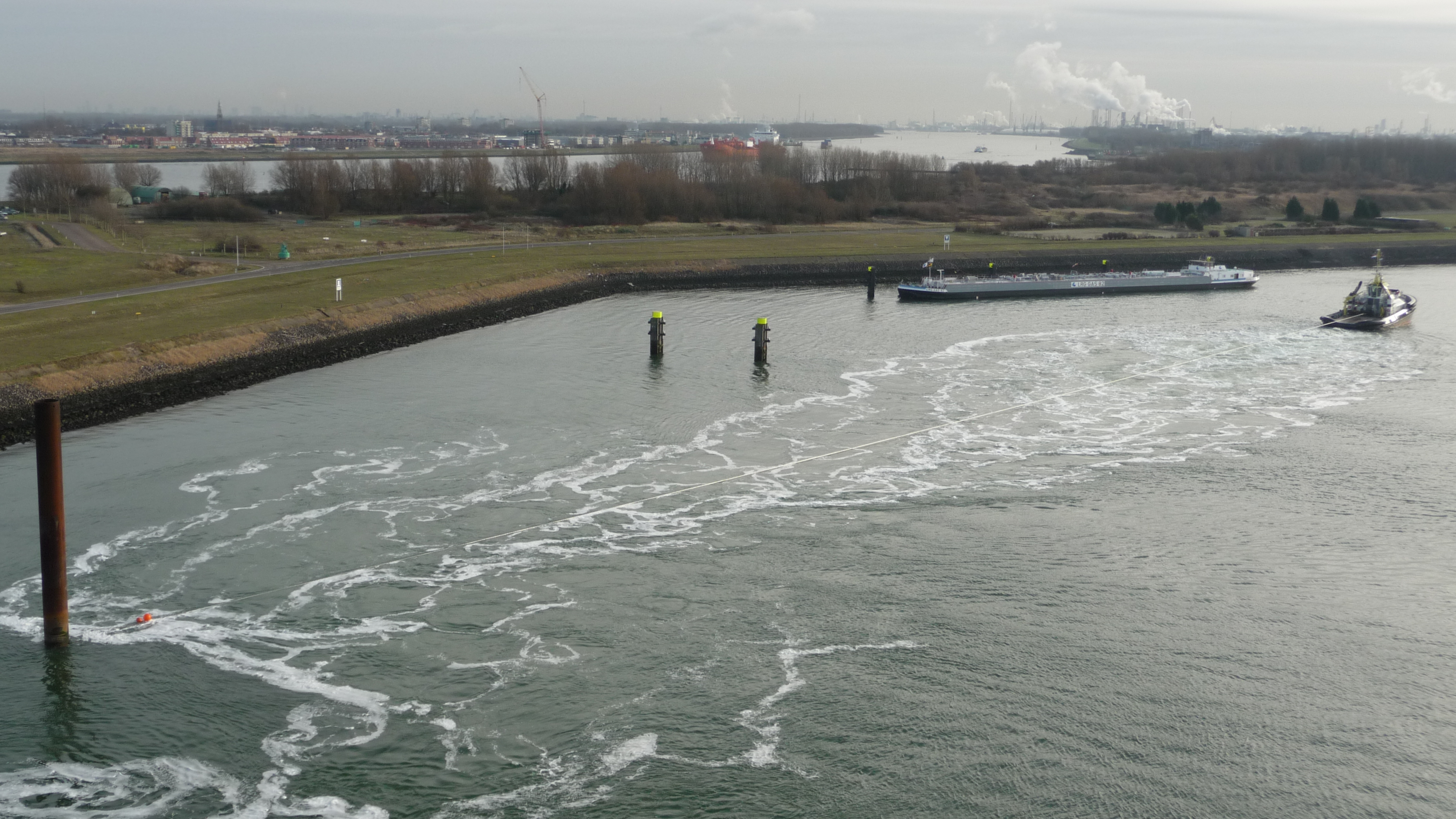
Tugboat undergoing a bollard pull measurement

=== Simulation ===
This method eliminates much of the uncertainties of the practical trial. However, any numerical simulation also has an error margin. Furthermore, simulation tools and computer systems capable of determining bollard pull for a ship design are costly. Hence, this method makes sense for larger shipyards and for the design of a series of ships.

Both methods can be combined. Practical trials can be used to validate the result of numerical simulation.

== Human-powered vehicles ==
Practical bollard pull tests under simplified conditions are conducted for human powered vehicles. There, bollard pull is often a category in competitions and gives an indication of the power train efficiency. Although conditions for such measurements are inaccurate in absolute terms, they are the same for all competitors. Hence, they can still be valid for comparing several craft.

== See also ==
- Azipod
- Kort nozzle
- Tractive force
