= Detroiter =

Detroiter could refer to:

- A resident or native of Detroit, Michigan
- the Detroiter (train), a passenger train operated by the New York Central Railroad
- the Detroiter Abend - Post, a newspaper
- a 1953 convertible car made by Detroit Accessories Co. in St. Clair Shores, Michigan
- Detroiter (fireboat), Detroit's first fireboat -- see Fireboats of Detroit
- a figure skating lift
- Stinson Detroiter
