= Edward M. Cotter (fireboat) =

Fireboat for the Buffalo Fire Department

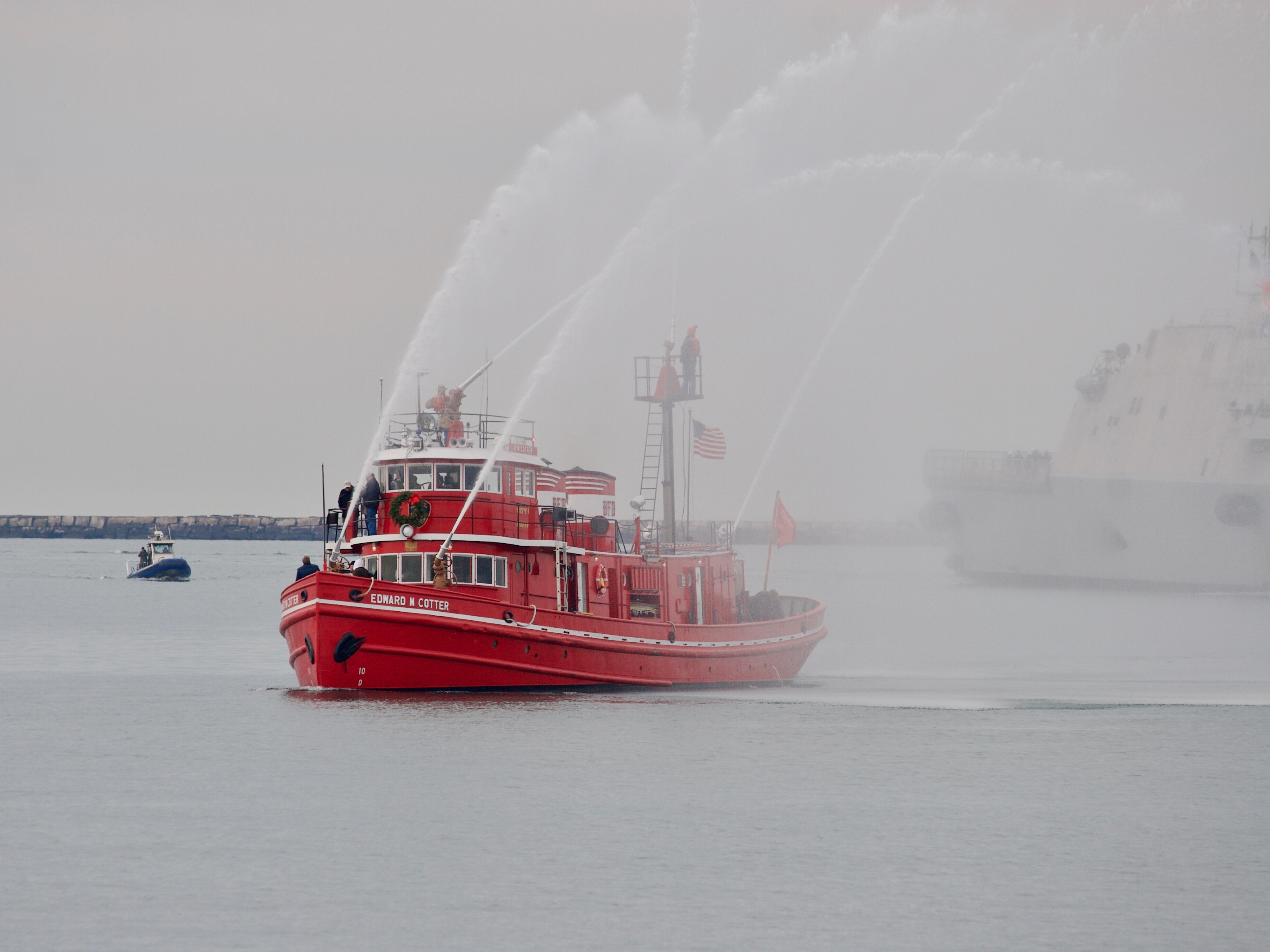
- Edward M. Cotter escorting USS Little Rock (LCS-9).

History

United States
- Name: William S. Grattan (Engine 20)
- Operator: Buffalo Fire Department
- Builder: Crescent Shipbuilding of Elizabeth City, New Jersey
- Cost: $91,000
- Laid down: March 24, 1900
- Sponsored by: Virginia Pearson
- Christened: September 1, 1900, by Lucia Virginia Malone
- In service: 1900-1928; 1930-present
- Out of service: 1928-1930
- Renamed: Firefighter (1953); Edward M. Cotter (1954)
- Refit: July 1928 - November 1930, Buffalo Dry Dock Company; November 1952 - November 1953, Sturgeon Bay Shipbuilding & Dry Dock Company
- Home port: Buffalo, NY

General characteristics
- Type: Fireboat
- Tonnage: 274 Gross tons (1900); 178 Gross tons (1953)
- Length: 118 ft (36 m)
- Beam: 24 ft (7.3 m)
- Draft: 10 ft 10 in (3.30 m)
- Ice class: 1.5 in (38.1 mm) thick belt line of Swedish steel around the icebreaking part of the hull
- Installed power: 2 × Babcock & Wilcox coal-fired boilers and steam engines; 900 indicated horsepower (670 kW) (1900); Oil-fired boilers and steam engines (1930); 4 × Caterpillar D-397 diesel V-type 12-cylinder engines (1953)
- Propulsion: Single screw (1900); Twin screws (1953)
- Speed: 13 knots (24 km/h; 15 mph) (1900); 11.5 knots (21.3 km/h; 13.2 mph) (1953)
- Capacity: Water Pumping Capacity; Three double action steam pumps; 9,000 US gal (34,070 L; 7,494 imp gal) per minute (1900); Four DeLaval Centrifugal Pumps; 15,000 US gal (56,781 L; 12,490 imp gal) per minute at 160 psi (11 bar; 1,100 kPa) (1953)
- Notes: Fire monitors: 3 (1900); 4 (1930); 5 (1953)
- Edward M. Cotter
- U.S. National Register of Historic Places
- U.S. National Historic Landmark
- New York State Register of Historic Places
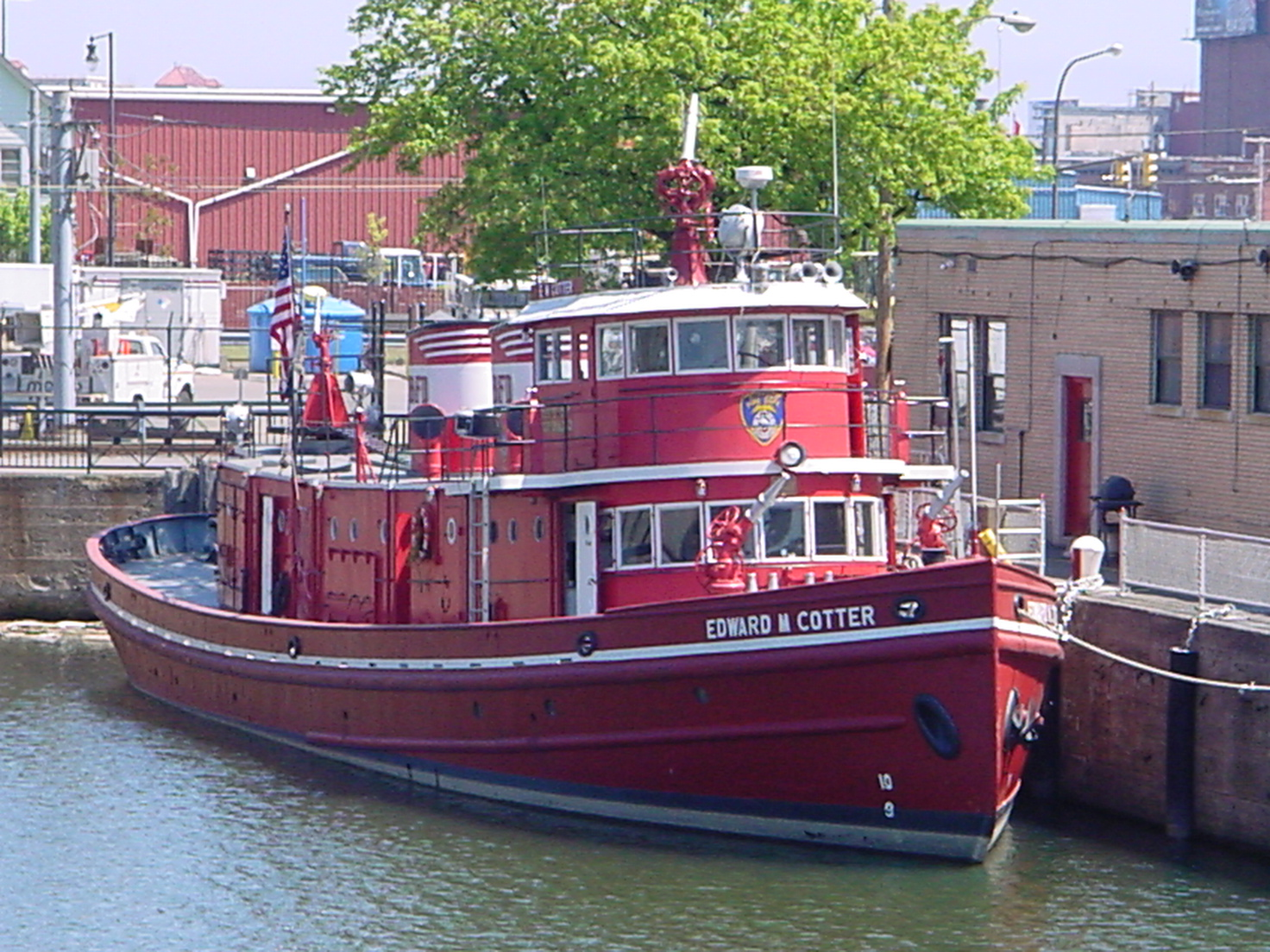

- Location within New York
- Location: Buffalo, New York
- Built: 1900
- Architect: Crescent Shipbuilding Co.
- NRHP reference No.: 96000968
- NYSRHP No.: 02940.006768

Significant dates
- Added to NRHP: June 28, 1996
- Designated NHL: June 28, 1996
- Designated NYSRHP: June 28, 1996

Edward M. Cotter is a fireboat in use by the Buffalo Fire Department at Buffalo, New York, United States. Originally named William S. Grattan, it was built in 1900 by the Crescent Shipyard of Elizabeth Port, New Jersey. Due to age, it was rebuilt in 1953 and renamed Firefighter upon its return to service. The following year it was renamed Edward M. Cotter. Its namesake, Edward Cotter, was a Buffalo firefighter and leader of the local firefighters union who had recently died.

Edward M. Cotter is considered to be the oldest active fireboat in the world and was designated a National Historic Landmark in 1996. Along with its firefighting duties, during the winter Edward M. Cotter is used as an icebreaker on Buffalo's rivers. Edward M. Cotter mounts five fire monitors that are capable of pumping 15,000 US gallons per minute (0.95 m^{3}/s; 12,000 imp gal/min). It can often be seen sailing out of its berth and south-west to Lake Erie, returning north through the breakwall and firing its fire monitors.

== Construction ==
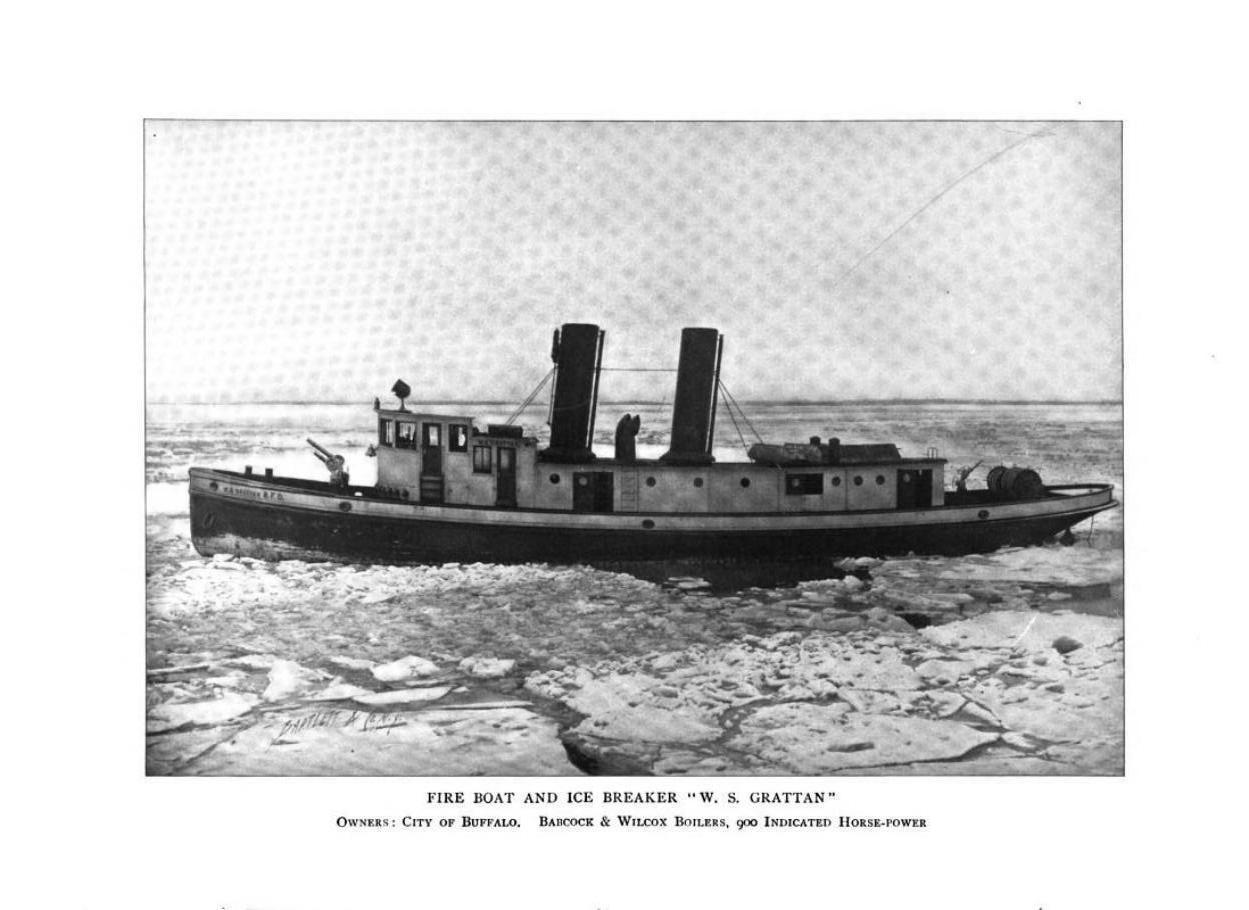
William S. Grattan c. 1904

The ship that was to become Edward M. Cotter was built in 1900 by the Crescent Shipyard of Elizabeth Port, New Jersey. She was originally named William S. Grattan after the first paid fire commissioner for the city of Buffalo. Construction was started on March 24, 1900, and she was christened on September 1, 1900, by Lucia Virginia Malone, the nine-year-old daughter of one of the city's fire commissioners. The final construction cost for the ship was $91,000.

The completed ship was 118 ft (36 m) in length, had a beam of 24 ft (7.3 m), and drew 10 ft 10 in (3.30 m). A 1.5 in (38.1 mm)-thick belt-line of Swedish steel was included around the hull for icebreaking duties. William S. Grattan was powered by two Babcock & Wilcox coal-fired boilers with steam engines rated at 900 horsepower (670 kW). A single propeller provided propulsion. The rated speed of the ship was 13 knots (24 km/h; 15 mph).

The ship was also equipped with three double action steam pumps that supplied water at 9,000 US gallons per minute (0.57 m^{3}/s; 7,500 imp gal/min) to the three fire monitors used for firefighting. Two of the fire monitors were mounted on the forward section of the ship and one was on the stern section.

== History ==
At the beginning of the twentieth century, Buffalo's waterfront was an extremely busy center of commerce. Grain elevators, warehouses and shipping traffic had overtaxed the two existing fireboats: John T. Hutchinson (Engine 23) and George R. Potter (Engine 29). Also, the city of Buffalo had shoreline hookups to allow the fireboats to serve as floating pumping stations supplying high pressure water to a fire hydrant system that covered the downtown area. The decision was made by city officials to order a third boat that would also have icebreaking capability along with her normal firefighting duties.

Upon completion she traveled up the Atlantic coast, down the St. Lawrence River, across Lake Ontario, through the Welland Canal and finally across Lake Erie in an uneventful trip that took 14 days. She was met 3 miles (4.8 km) out of the harbor by her sister fireboats and escorted in.

=== 1928 fire ===
On July 28, 1928 William S. Grattan responded to the oil barge James F. Cahill, loaded with 5,000 barrels of crude oil, that was aflame in the Buffalo River at Elk Street while docked at the Atlas Refinery. Thirty-five fire companies, the Grattan and another fireboat battled the blaze. After burning 17 hours, the barge's mooring lines gave way and the barge began to drift following a series of four explosions. William S. Grattan's crew attempted to attach tow lines to the drifting barge but it struck a dock at an oil company where the empty oil tanker B.B. McColl was moored. The fumes on the B.B. McColl ignited causing an explosion and fire that engulfed William S. Grattan. Captain Thomas Hylant along with his crew abandoned ship and swam through the flames to shore. Chief Engineer Thomas Lynch of William S. Grattan lost his life after abandoning ship and seven other crew members were injured. The unattended boilers on William S. Grattan soon ran dry and exploded, leaving the ship burned out to the waterline and heavily damaged.

William S. Grattan sat boarded-up for eighteen months while city and fire department officials decided whether to replace her at a cost of $225,000 or rebuild her for $99,000, which was $8,000 more than her original cost. The decision was made to rebuild and in 1930 she was rebuilt at the Buffalo Dry Dock Company of Buffalo, New York. During this refit some improvements were made to William S. Grattan. One improvement was that her boilers were converted from burning coal to burning oil. The engines were rebuilt and her firefighting system was updated and could now handle foam fire retardant. Also, the pilot house was raised to the upper boat deck level and a fixed turret tower with a fire monitor was constructed on the stern of the ship. A fourth fire monitor was added to the top of the pilot house of the ship as well. As part of her acceptance ceremony she participated in a race against the harbor tug Kentucky, which was considered to be one of the fastest tugs on the Great Lakes.

=== 1953 refit ===
In the early 1950s, it was noticed that William S. Grattan was showing signs of age. Her boilers were only able to operate at 40 percent capacity and an engine room steam leak in 1951 injured part of her crew. During November 1952, William S. Grattan was sent to the Sturgeon Bay Shipbuilding & Dry Dock Company of Sturgeon Bay, Wisconsin for a refit.

During this refit her boilers and steam engines were replaced by diesel engines, the pumps for the firefighting system were replaced, the single propeller was replaced with twin propellers, the fixed firefighting platform was replaced with a hydraulically operated platform and the twin funnels were replaced with lower dummy funnels. Upon her return in 1954, she was renamed Firefighter. In 1955 she was renamed again in honor of Edward M. Cotter, a respected Buffalo firefighter and the leader of the local firefighters union, who had recently died. After the refit Edward M. Cotter mounted five fire monitors capable of pumping 15,000 US gallons per minute (0.95 m^{3}/s; 12,000 imp gal/min).

=== International firefighting ===
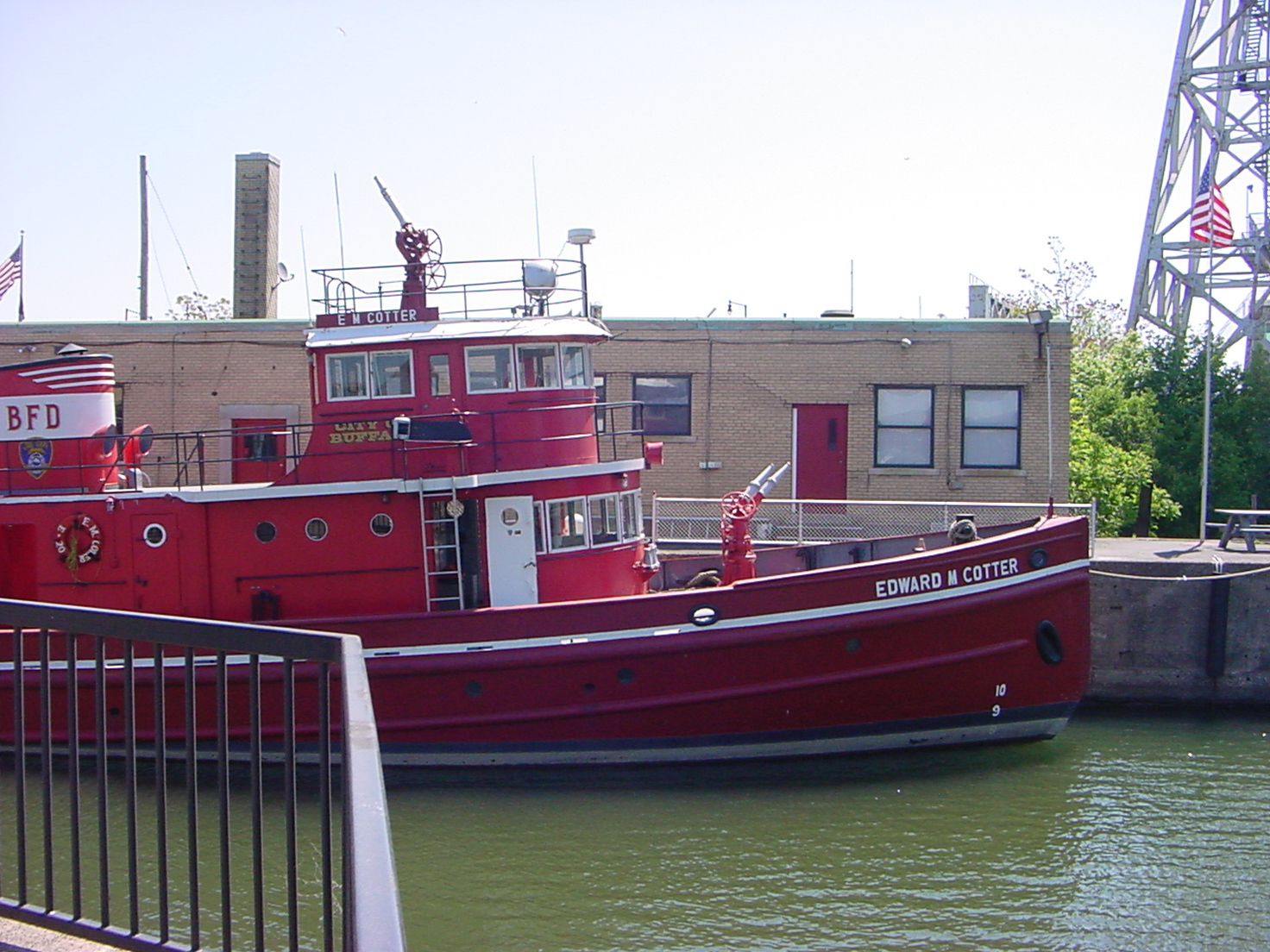
Edward M. Cotter with her station house in the background

On October 7, 1960 Edward M. Cotter came to the aid of firefighting authorities in Port Colborne, Ontario, Canada. Two days previously, on October 5, 1960, a set of grain elevators caught fire at the eight-story Maple Leaf Milling Company. The Port Colborne Fire Department did not have its own fireboat and they were unable to bring the fire under control. The Buffalo Fire Department was asked to send Edward M. Cotter to lend assistance. Escorted by a United States Coast Guard cutter, because she had never needed navigational equipment of her own, Edward M. Cotter proceeded across the international border. The voyage to Port Colborne took two hours with an additional four hours needed to bring the fire under control. This mission is said to have been the first instance that a United States fire boat had crossed an international border to help authorities in another country.

=== Notable rescues ===
In 1978 USS Little Rock, a retired United States Naval guided missile cruiser on display at the Buffalo and Erie County Naval & Military Park, began taking on water and listing. Edward M. Cotter and several Buffalo Fire Department fire engines pumped water out of Little Rock for five days keeping the ship afloat and level while repairs were made. Edward M. Cotter also assisted the disabled United States Coast Guard cutter Ojibwa during the winter of 1983. Ojibwa, while on Lake Erie, had lost her steering and was taking on water. Edward M. Cotter towed Ojibwa to her base in Buffalo and helped keep her afloat while repairs were made. Another rescue occurred on July 31, 1984, when Edward M. Cotter towed the Polish tall ship Zawisza Czarny off a sand bar during the ship's visit to Buffalo.

== Heritage ==
As commerce declined on Buffalo's waterfront, Edward M. Cotter was transferred from the Buffalo Fire Department to the Public Works Department in 1992 for icebreaking duties. In 1996 Edward M. Cotter was designated a National Historic Landmark. and was transferred back to the Buffalo Fire Department in 1997.

A non-profit group named "Friends of the Cotter", founded in 2005, has been running fund-raising events to overhaul Edward M. Cotter. Along with her normal duties Edward M. Cotter has been sent to various festivals and boat shows around the Great Lakes.

On March 24, 2023, a proclamation was issued by Buffalo mayor Byron Brown and the City of Buffalo Common Council declaring March 24 to be recognized as "Edward M. Cotter Day" in recognition of the fireboat's 123 years of service. A fund raising campaign with a goal of six million dollars was announced by Fireboat E.M. Cotter Conservancy President Larry Cobado to restore the Cotter to full operational condition.

== Other fire boats ==
Edward Cotter is one of a few fireboats to ply the Great Lakes:

- William Lyon Mackenzie is operated by Toronto Fire Services and operates in Lake Ontario.
- Curtis Randolph is operated by Detroit Fire Department and operates in the Detroit River.
- Anthony J. Celebrezze is operated by Cleveland Division of Fire and is stationed in the Cuyahoga River and operates in Cleveland Harbor.

== See also ==
- List of National Historic Landmarks in New York
- List of U.S. National Historic Landmark ships, shipwrecks, and shipyards
- History of Buffalo, New York
- SS Canadiana
- USS Sable (IX-81)
- MV Aquarama
