= Fireboats of Detroit =

As an important river port, there has been six fireboats operated by the Detroit Fire Department.

Image	Name	Commissioned	Decommissioned	Notes
	Detroiter	1892	1902	Built by Craig Shipbuilding, stripped of firefighting equipment for James R. Elliot after dry rot developed, sold in 1903 to Reid Wrecking and Towing Company as a wrecking tug, dismantled in 1942
	James Battle	1900	1941	Built by Detroit Ship Building Company, later sold as tug to Sincennes-McNaughton Line (1941–1959) and McAllister Towing and Salvage Incorporated in Montreal for used as fireboat in Montreal from 1959 to 1992 Detroit Ship Building Co. Retired and scrapped with cabin/funnel surviving in Port Colborne Dry Dock
	James R. Elliott	1902	1930	Built by Jenks Shipbuilding Company, sold to Owen Sound Transportation, Limited and converted as ferry Normac (Manitoulin Island); retired and sold in 1968 to Lee Marine Limited and to Captain John Restaurant in Toronto; sank in 1981, raised and restored after 1986 and now serves as floating restaurant Tokyo Joe's Bar and Grill in Port Dalhousie, Ontario. Boat burned 2011 and fate unknown.
	John Kendall	1930	1979	Sold to Robert Massey of Pan Oceanic Engineering Corporation of Alpena, Michigan and converted as tug for Ferris Marine; scrapped in 1994
	Curtis Randolph	1979	present	Docked at foot of 24th Street and Detroit Riverwalk near Riverside Park
	Sivad Johnson	2020-08-31	present	A smaller, more modern vessel, named after Sivad Heshimu Johnson, an off-duty firefighter who perished helping to rescue three drowning children
