= John Kendall (fireboat) =

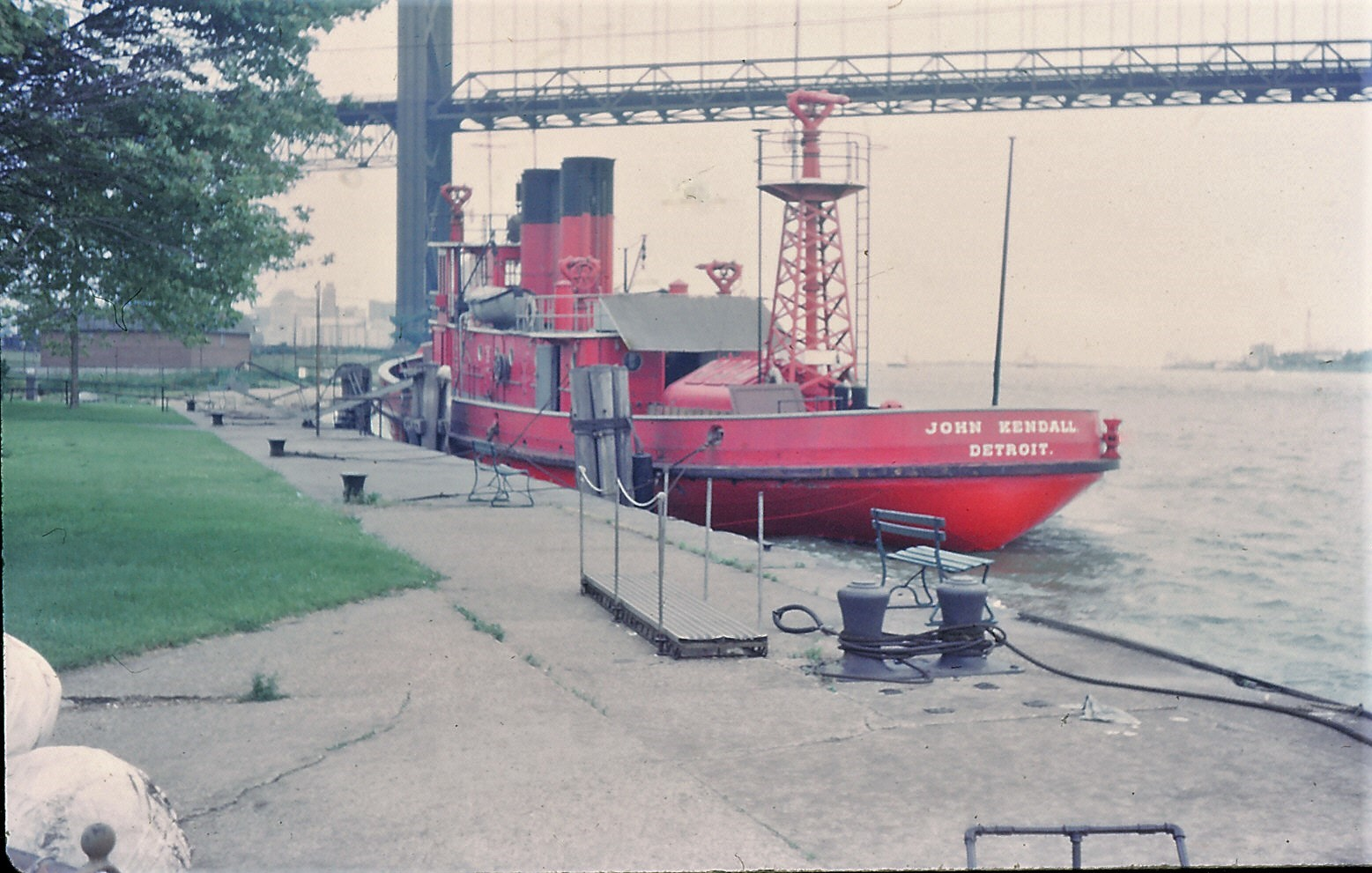
John Kendall moored at Riverside Park Boat Launch, July 1969

The John Kendall was a steam-powered fireboat launched in 1929 by the Toledo Shipbuilding Company and operated by the Detroit Fire Department from 1930 to 1976. During her service as a fireboat she continued to be propelled by steam engines, requiring a crew of ten, five of whom were required to stoke her boiler. She was converted to a tugboat, and her steam engines were finally replaced by diesel engines. She served an additional 20 years as a tug, out of Alpena, Michigan. She was scrapped in 1994.

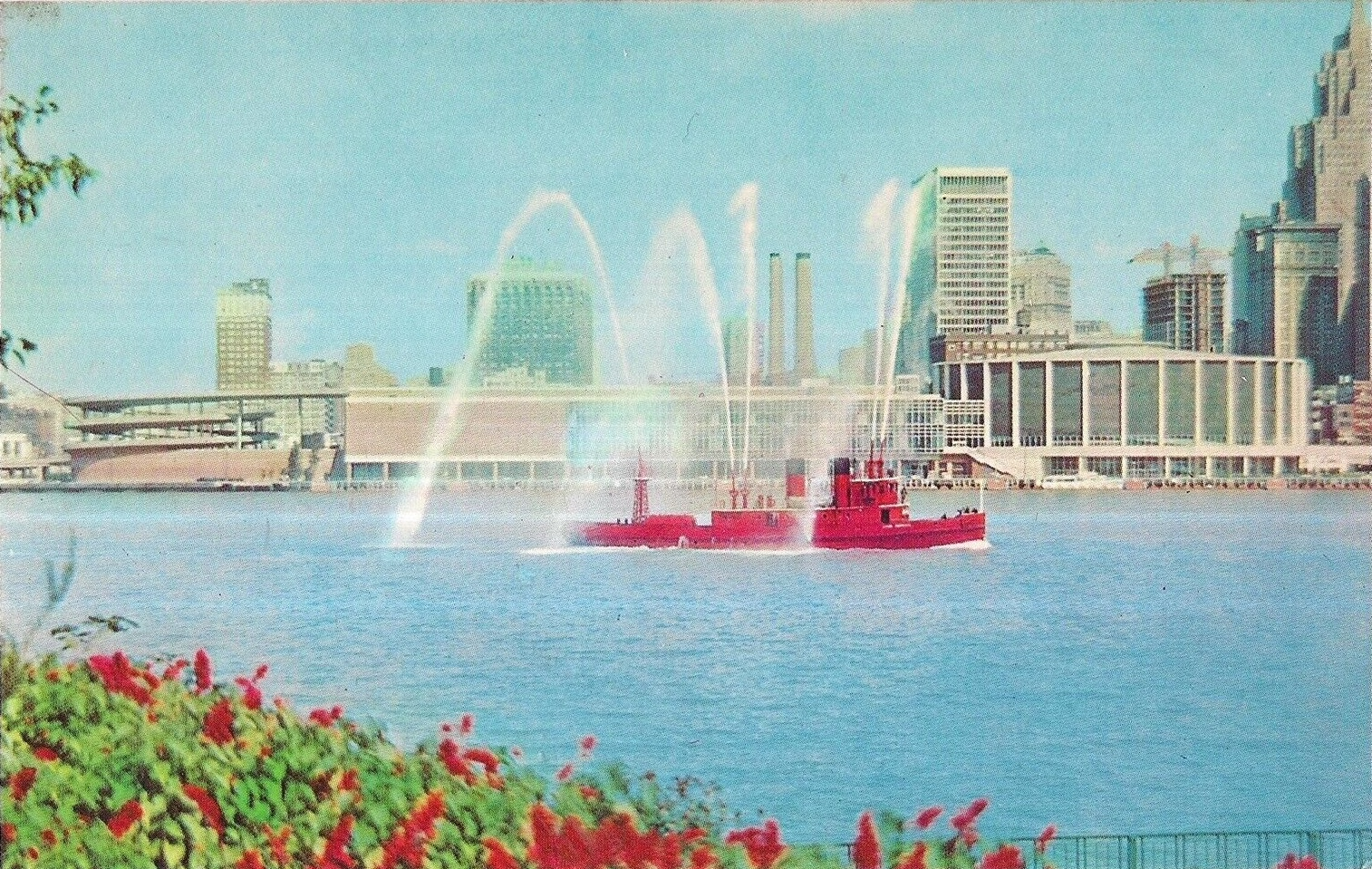
Circa 1964 postcard of the John Kendall

According to Bob Dombrowski, the author of 38 Years: a Detroit Firefighter's Story, she was 135 feet (41 m) long. But in 1976, the year she was decommissioned, The Scanner reported she was 128 feet (39 m) long.

== Namesake ==
The vessel's namesake had followed his father's footsteps, and joined the Fire Department as a volunteer, when he was just fourteen years old. He served the department for 58 years. John Kendall was appointed Detroit's third Fire Department Chief in 1898. Detroit's first two fire chiefs, James Battle and James R. Elliott had previously been honoured by having the Department's second (James Battle) and third fireboats named after them. Detroit's fifth and most recent fireboat, the Curtis Randolph, was named after a firefighter who died in the line of duty.

== See all ==
- Fireboats of Detroit
