= Detroit Police Department =

Law enforcement agency in Detroit, Michigan

City of Detroit Police Department
- Patch of the Detroit Police Department

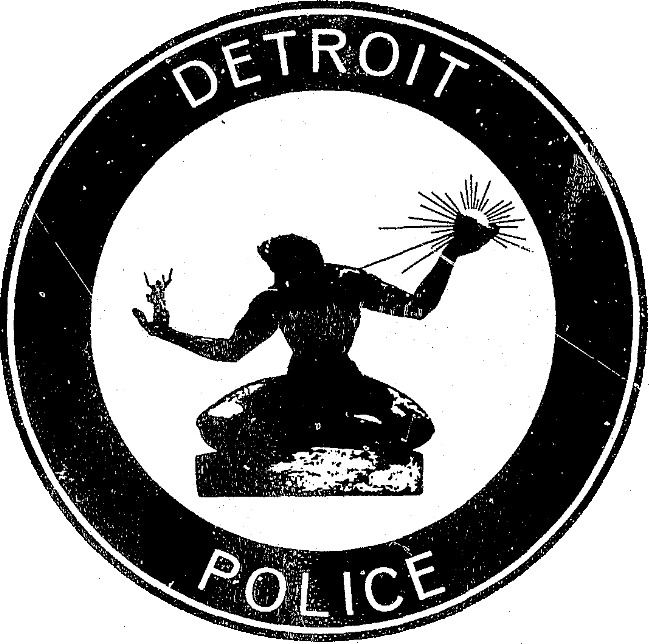
- Seal of the Detroit Police Department

- Badge of a DPD officer with badge number removed
- Abbreviation: DPD

Agency overview
- Formed: 1865; 161 years ago

Jurisdictional structure
- Operations jurisdiction: Detroit, Michigan, United States
- Map of City of Detroit Police Department's jurisdiction

Operational structure
- Headquarters: Detroit Public Safety Headquarters
- Officers: 2,450
- Agency executive: Todd Bettison, Chief of Police

Facilities
- Precincts: 12: Downtown Services; 2nd Precinct; 3rd Precinct; 4th Precinct; 5th Precinct; 6th Precinct; 7th Precinct; 8th Precinct; 9th Precinct; 10th Precinct; 11th Precinct; 12th Precinct

Website
- detroitmi.gov/police

The City of Detroit Police Department, commonly known as the Detroit Police Department (DPD), is the primary law enforcement agency of the city of Detroit, Michigan, United States. Founded in 1865, it has nearly 2,630 officers, making it the largest law enforcement organization in the state. In addition to 2,630 sworn-officers, the Department has filled 760 of 823 non-sworn positions such as dispatchers and Real Time Crime Center analysts.

== History ==
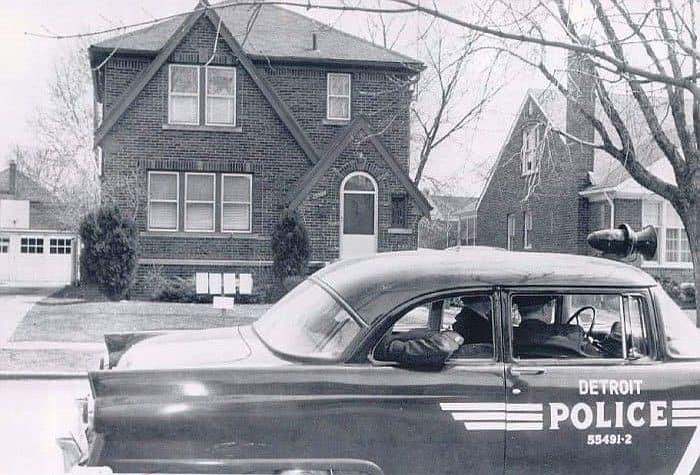
A patrolling Detroit police cruiser in 1955

Detroit: Today and Tomorrow (1957) (29:11)
1957 documentary about the Detroit Police Department's ambulances

=== Establishment ===
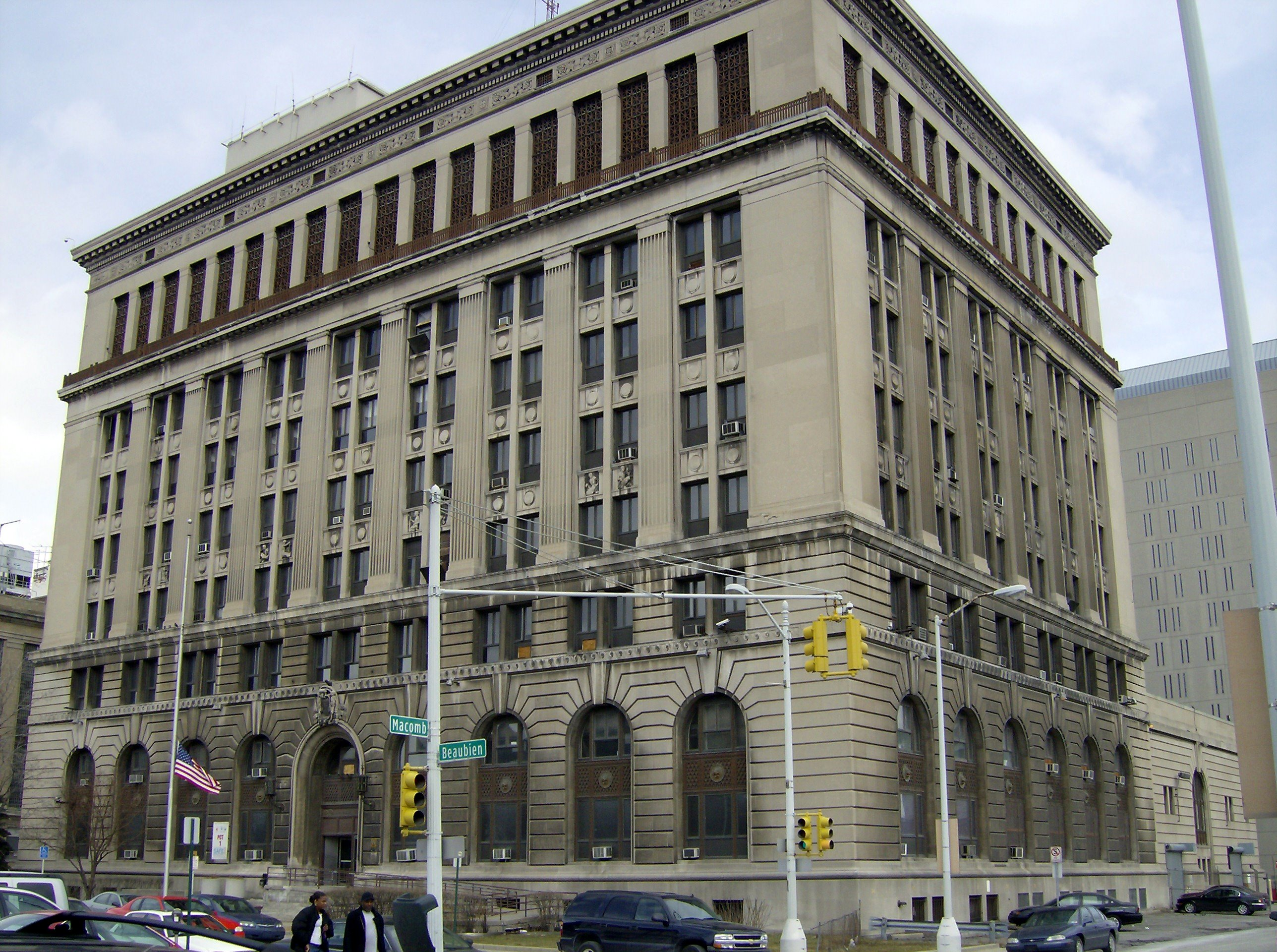
The historic former Detroit Police Headquarters at 1300 Beaubien

Town constables were appointed in the territory for Detroit starting in 1801. During the American Civil War, the city's racial tensions escalated, and protests against the draft led to the Detroit race riot of 1863. The riots resulted in two deaths, the destruction of 35 buildings, and over 200 Black residents left homeless. Although a formal Police Commission had been established in 1861, the city responded to the violence by officially creating a full-time police force, with the first forty policemen beginning work in 1865. However, the department remained predominantly white well into the late 20th century.

=== 1890s ===
==== Role of women and ethnic minorities ====
In 1893, the department hired its first policewoman (Marie Owen) and its first black policeman (L. T. Toliver). The Detroit Police Department established a Women's Division in 1921 that was tasked with cases of "child abuse, sexual assaults, juvenile delinquency, and checking establishments for illegal minors." Female officers were not allowed to work on criminal cases unless accompanied by male officers until 1973, after a series of discrimination lawsuits prompted changes in department policy.

=== 1920s ===
==== Technological innovations ====
In 1928, the Detroit Police Department became the first police department in the country to utilize radio dispatch in their patrol cars. The system used a one-way radio in a single police car to broadcast messages from headquarters. A historical marker at Belle Isle Park describes the new advancement in technology.

=== 1940s ===
==== Corruption charges ====
In February 1940, Mayor Richard Reading, the Superintendent of Police, the county sheriff and over a hundred more were indicted on corruption charges. The Mayor was accused of selling promotions in the department. Eighty officers were accused of protecting illegal gambling operations in the city. In the end, the Mayor served three years in jail, ending in 1947.

=== 1950s ===
In 1957, the Detroit Police Department employed 5,000 policemen and operated a fleet of ambulances to respond to medical emergencies.

=== 2000s ===
==== Federal oversight ====
In 2000, the Detroit Free Press published a series of articles after a four-month investigation into fatal shootings by Detroit police officers. At the time, Detroit had the highest rate of police-involved shootings of any large city in the United States, surpassing New York, Los Angeles, and Houston. The city requested an investigation by the United States Department of Justice into the department's handling of deadly force incidents. By 2001, the Justice Department's investigation had uncovered issues with the department's arrest and detention practices as well. Between 2003 and 2014, the Detroit Police Department was placed under federal court oversight by the Justice Department as the result of allegations about excessive force, illegal arrests and improper detention. This process cost the city of Detroit more than $50 million. By 2014, the department's use of force had been "seriously reduced" and the U.S. District Judge overseeing the case stated that the Detroit Police Department had "met its obligations" for reforms.

==== Patrol geography changes ====
In 2005, the department's thirteen precincts were consolidated into six larger districts as a cost-cutting measure. The department restored a number of precincts in 2009 after citizens complained about the change. In 2011, it was announced that the Detroit Police Department would be reverting to the original precinct structure, with officials citing "gap[s] in services" and concerns over the new command structure.

=== 2010s ===
On January 23, 2011, 38-year-old Lamar Moore walked into the 6th precinct with a pistol shotgun and shot and wounded 4 officers before being killed.

On November 9, 2017, undercover police posing as drug dealers tried to arrest a group of undercover police posing as drug buyers, which led to a multi-person fight and several injuries. Police Chief James Craig told the Detroit Free Press that the brawl was "probably one of the most embarrassing things I've seen in this department."

==== Headquarters relocation ====
On June 11, 2010 it was reported that the City of Detroit would acquire the former MGM Grand Detroit temporary casino building (originally the IRS Data Center) on John C. Lodge Freeway for $6.23 million and convert it into a new police headquarters complex which would also house a crime lab operated by the Michigan State Police. The renovated building also houses the Detroit Fire Department headquarters. The former casino building has 400,000 square feet (37,000 m^{2}) of space. The historic Detroit Police headquarters is in Greektown. On June 28, 2013, the new public safety headquarters opened for business.

=== 2020s ===
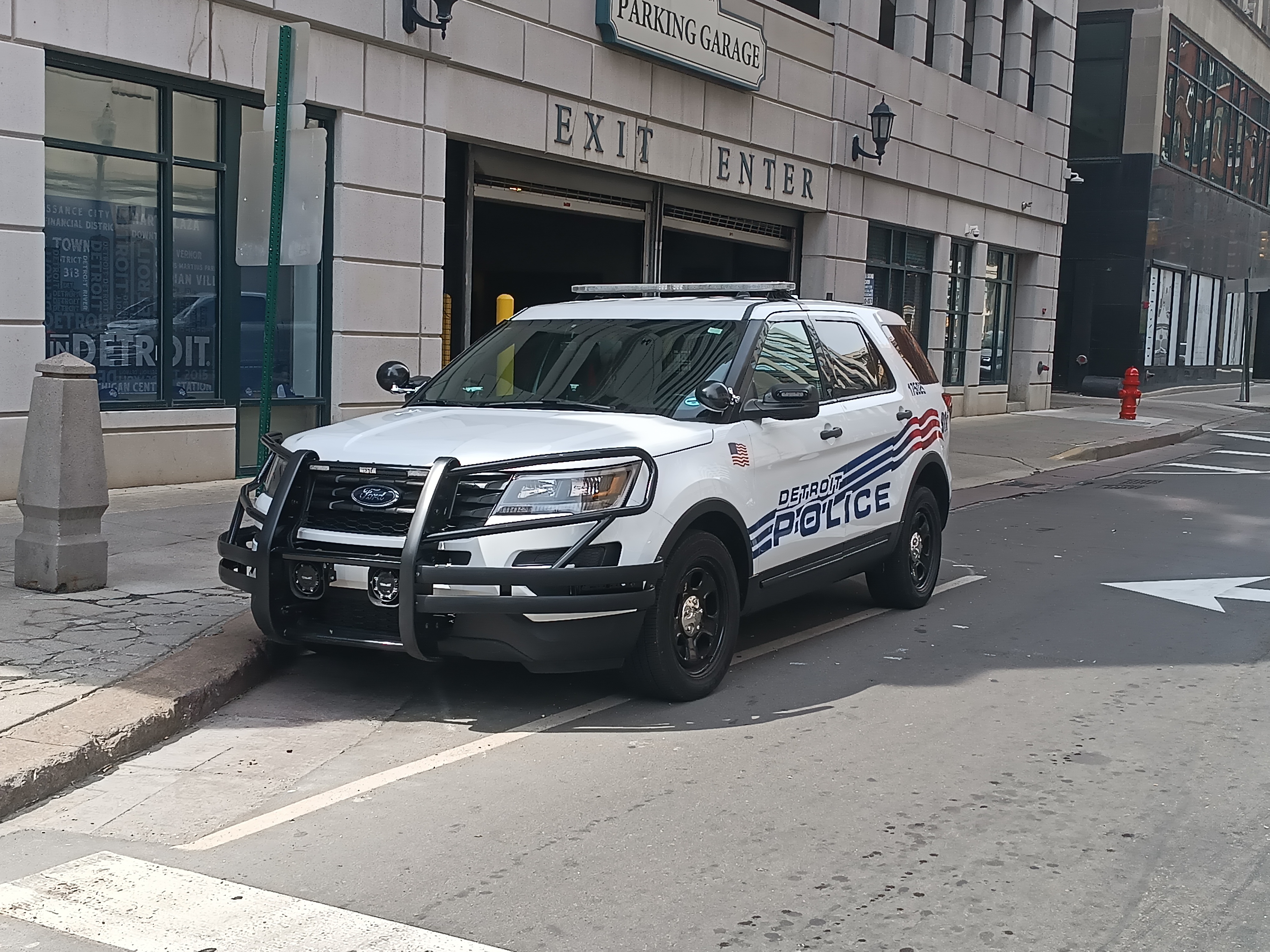
Patrol vehicle in 2024

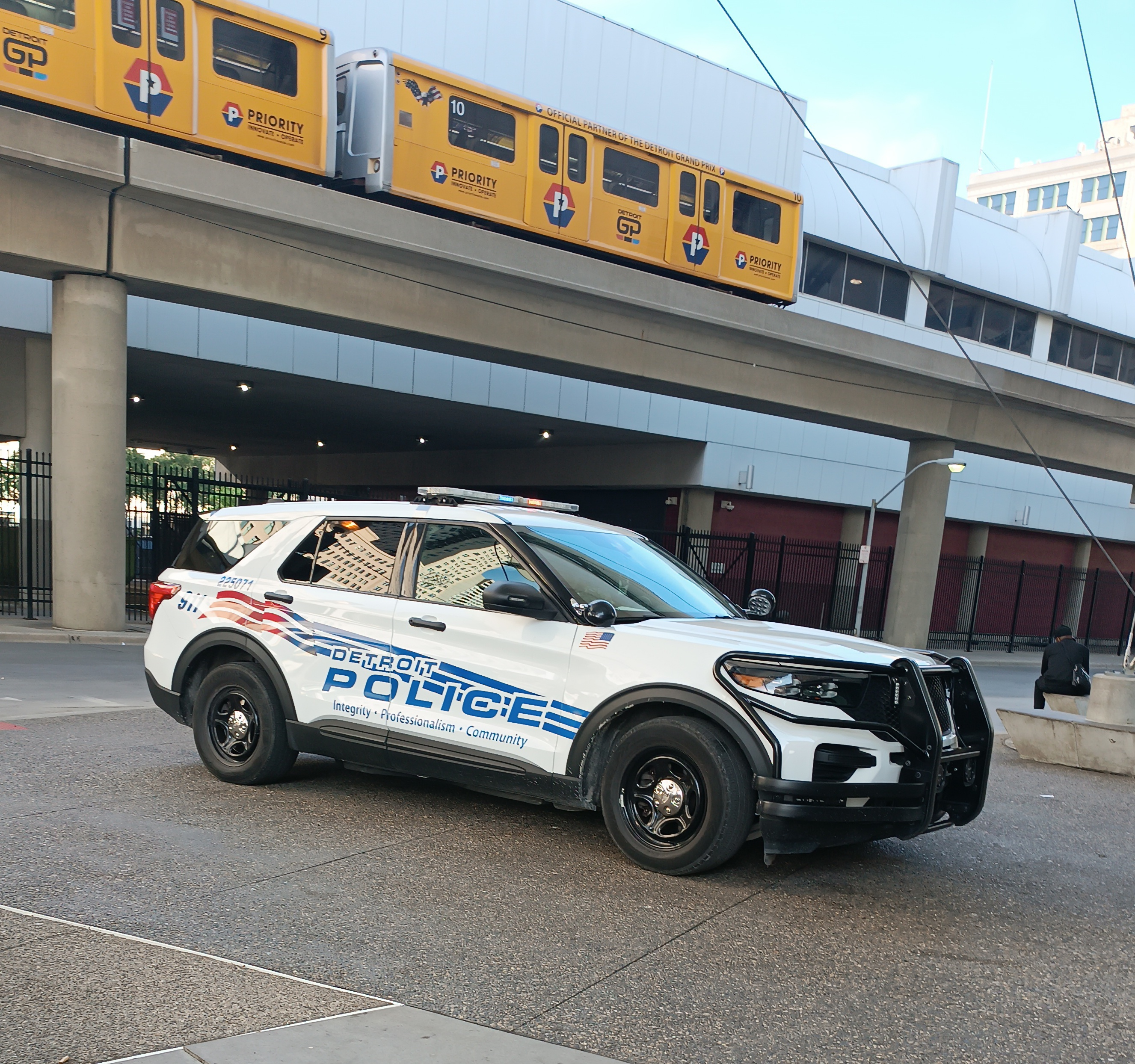
Ford Police Interceptor Utility of DPD

The 2022 budget for the department was $341 million, constituting 28.7% of the city's general fund.

==== COVID-19 pandemic ====
As the SARS-CoV-2 coronavirus continues to spread around the United States, several Detroit Police officers tested positive for being infected with the COVID-19 virus, and over 200 more were quarantined to prevent further spread of the virus in the Detroit metro area. Several infected people in the Detroit metro area had already succumbed to the virus and died after it was first discovered in the counties Detroit and its suburbs were located in. The Detroit Police suffered its first casualty to the virus with the death of a 38-year-old civilian dispatcher.

== Fallen officers ==
Since 1878, the Detroit Police Department has lost 250 officers in the line of duty.

== Rank structure and insignia ==
Rank	Insignia
Chief	
Assistant chief	
Deputy chief	
Commander	
Captain	
Lieutenant	
Sergeant	
Detective	
Neighborhood police officer	
Corporal	
Police officer	
Reserve officer	

== Demographics ==
2013 breakdown of gender and ethnic minorities employed by the DPD: (Note: Does not equal 100 percent due to rounding.)

- Male: 75%
- Female: 25%
- African-American or black: 63%
- White: 33%
- Hispanic, any race: 4%
- Asian: 0.4%

The Detroit Police Department has one of the largest percentages of Black officers of any major city police department, reflecting current overall city demographics. Lawsuits alleging discrimination stemming from the influence of affirmative action and allegations of race-based promotional bias for executive positions have surfaced repeatedly. As of 2008, the majority of upper command members in the Detroit PD were Black.

== Controversies ==
The table below lists people killed by and controversies involved with the Detroit Police Department.

Date	Name of deceased (age)	Officer(s) involved	Description of event
2004-11-11	Dennis Crawford (31)	Officers LaRon York and Barron Townsend	Crawford was unarmed and was killed by LaRon York and Barron Townsend. According to reports "York shot him four times, once in the back, once in the head, and twice in the leg." The mother of Crawford's son claims that Crawford was shot 15 times in an online report. In addition, the federal lawsuit was settled with the Crawford family for an undisclosed amount and York was later removed from the police force, however Townsend remained and was involved in the killing of Tommie Staples in 2008.
2005-02-02	Wilbert Burks (39)	Undisclosed	Killed by police in his home. According to eyewitnesses "It was overkill,” a neighbor told reporter Dianne Bukowski. “They had over 28 shots and he never shot off a round. The house was riddled with bullets. His girlfriend had two children in the house at the time. Her teenage daughter passed out, and they had to call EMS for her. Afterwards, the police were laughing in the street, like it was a party."
2005-02-12	Allante Lightfoote-Powell (16)	Undisclosed	Killed by police in the basement of his home. Police claim he was armed and came out firing however according to reports "no gunshot residue tests were performed on his hands, according to records later obtained from DPD."
2005-07-03	Anthony Scott (25)	Undisclosed	Killed by police at a gas station. Police claim he had a knife in his hand but according to witnesses "he did not pull it or otherwise threaten the cops." Scott's family sued the city of Detroit for a wrongful death. It was settled for $1.2 million.
2005-08-07	James A. Stone	Undisclosed	James "Poppa" Stone, "died in [police] custody at the Second Precinct after pleading to go to the hospital for several days."
2006-01 through 2006-06	Alleged Rapes by Detroit Police	Officers Mishael Osmand, Michael Parish and others	According to reports, "dozens of men on Detroit’s southwest side were subjected to literal rapes during pretextual traffic stops by officers Mishael Osmand and Michael Parish, under the guise of anal cavity searches for drugs, conducted on the public streets."
2006-11-26	Brandon Martell Moore (16)	Officer Eugene Williams	Moore was unarmed and "shot to death in the back by off duty police officer Eugene Williams."
2006-11-26	Unidentified Young Man	Undisclosed	According to reports, "An unidentified young man was shot to death that evening in a hail of gunfire by police, according to neighbors. The police had pursued him on foot after he allegedly tried to rob a Family Dollar store on W. McNichols. They claimed he fired a shot at them as he ran."
2007-02-12	Artrell Dickerson (18)	Officer Kata-Ante Taylor	According to reports, Dickerson was "shot in the back and killed by officer Kata-Ante Taylor as the teen, already wounded, lay on the ground next to Cantrell Funeral Home."
2007-07-07	Jevon Royall (30)	Officers Edward Brannick and Michael McGinnis	According to reports, Royall was "shot to death outside his home in front of his family by police officers Edward Brannick and Michael McGinnis."
2008-06	Tommie Staples Jr.	Officers Steven Kopp and Barron Townsend	Staples was unarmed and shot by Steven Kopp and Barron Townsend. Townsend was also involved in the killing of Dennis Crawford with another officer LaRon York, in 2004 which had led to a federal settlement. In the killing of Staples they "chased him down an alley in retaliation for the role he and his wife Jacquelyn Porter played as advocates for neighborhood children stopped by police." The federal lawsuit was reported as "settled for $2.5 million" in 2010.
2008-07-01	Shelton Bell Jr. (16)	Undisclosed	According to reports, Bell was "shot to death by an off-duty cop after allegedly demanding the keys to the cop’s car at a gas station on the west side, then running when the cop pulled his gun. The autopsy report shows that Bell, Jr. was shot ten times, five in the chest, three in the back, once in the head behind his right ear, and once in his left arm."
2008-07-18	Robert Hill (35)	Undisclosed	According to reports, Hill "rode his bicycle to an apartment building in Detroit and was rammed by a police car into another vehicle."
2009-08-13	Unnamed Motorist	Undisclosed	An unidentified motorist "died in a fiery crash" after being pursued by Detroit Police in a stolen pickup truck.
2010-05-16	Aiyana Stanley-Jones (7)	Officer Joseph Weekley Jr.	Stanley-Jones, aged 7, was shot during a Detroit Police raid. According to reports, "juries twice failed to reach a verdict in Weekley's case" allowing Weekley to walk free.
2010-07-04	Demarlo Hobbs (31)	Undisclosed	According to reports, Hobbs was "shot to death while riding a bicycle." Police were seeking him for questioning after he allegedly fired shots at a Detroit home. When police approached him he fired several rounds at the police officers before he was shot to death.
2012-07-08	Adaisha Miller (24)	Officer Isaac L. Parrish III	Miller, was shot to death while "dancing with Detroit cop" and witnesses claim that Parrish accidentally discharged his firearm, because he was improperly carrying it. The Detroit Police Chief claimed it was a "freak accident."
2015-03-30	Anthony Clark Reed (24)	Undisclosed	Reed died during a traffic stop. According to reports, he had asthma and police "yanked him out of his car, shortened his breath more, and increased his heart rate" where he subsequently died.

== Chiefs ==
The department is headed by a chief.

== See also ==
- Detroit Public Safety Headquarters
- Crime in Detroit, Michigan
- Government of Detroit
- List of law enforcement agencies in Michigan
- Lists of killings by law enforcement officers in the United States
- List of killings by law enforcement officers in the United States prior to 2009
