= Detroit Public Safety Headquarters =

Headquaters For DPD and DFD

Coordinates: 42.3302°N 83.0566°W

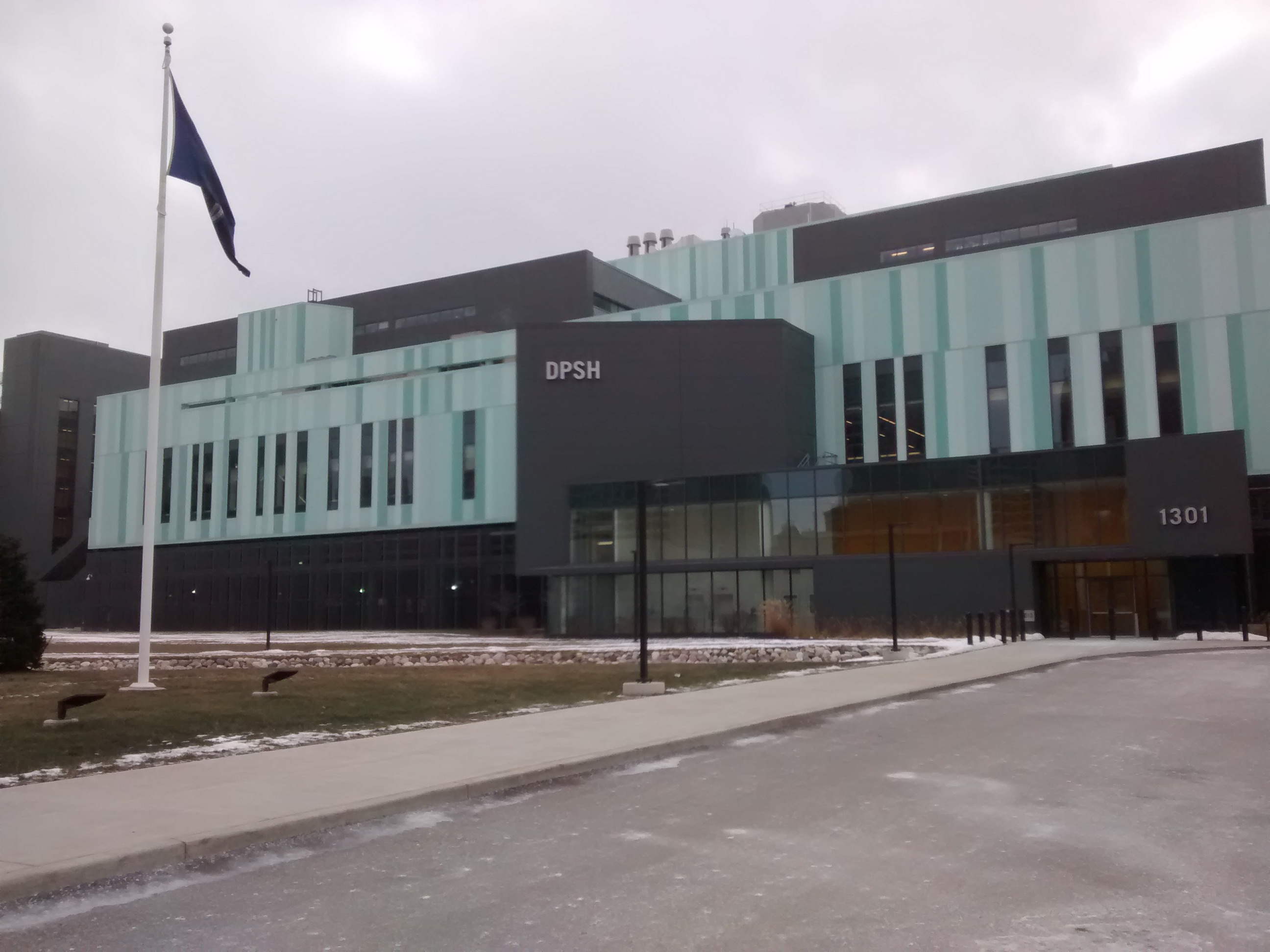
Detroit Public Safety Headquarters

The Detroit Public Safety Headquarters, located at 1301 Third Street in Detroit, Michigan, is a law enforcement and fire department complex which houses the headquarters for the Detroit Police Department, the Detroit Fire Department, the Detroit Emergency Medical Service, as well as a forensics laboratory for the Michigan State Police.

After the City of Detroit acquired the building its physical address was re-designated from John C. Lodge Freeway to its present address on Third Street and Michigan Avenue to disassociate itself from the building's prior occupants, the U.S. Internal Revenue Service who were the original owners and the MGM Grand Detroit Casino who purchased the building from the IRS.

== History ==
The idea of consolidating Detroit's public safety was not a new idea, and in fact had been discussed extensively as far back as Mayor Dennis Archer's administration but it wasn't until recent years that the city began to realize that 1300 Beaubien, where the Detroit Police had been headquartered since 1923, was beginning to show signs of aging and serious structural problems as well as an infestation of rodents and insects throughout the building. The City's Fire Department on West Larned was in better condition than the police headquarters, but was starting to lack sufficient space to house the department's offices and communications center.

As a result, both the police and fire departments had to go outside of city owned buildings for office space which began to cause a serious financial strain on the city bank accounts. Beginning with Mayor Kwame Kilpatrick's administration the city began kicking around the idea of consolidating the city's police and fire departments into one complex, however plans were temporarily halted following the sudden but not unexpected resignation of Kilpatrick because of his arrest on charges of federal corruption.

Following Kwame Kilpatrick's departure from the Mayor's office a special election was held in May 2009 and former Detroit Pistons and Basketball Hall of Famer Dave Bing was elected the new Mayor of Detroit. One year later on June 11, 2010 it was announced that the city had agreed to purchase the 600,000 square foot former MGM Grand Detroit temporary casino at 1300 John C. Lodge Freeway for $6.32 million, and that it would undergo a $60 million renovation funded primarily through the Detroit Building Authority. The plans were temporarily halted again when the Detroit City Council rejected the Mayor's plan 6 to 3 to purchase the former casino After negotiations the City Council voted 5 to 4 for the purchase of the property.

On June 28, 2013, exactly one year and seven days later, the Detroit Public Safety Headquarters opened with Mayor Bing, City Council members, the Wayne County Executive and other dignitaries attending a ribbon cutting ceremony official opening the complex. Police Chief James Craig and Fire Chief Craig Dougherty stated that both of their departments have already begun the move to the new DPHS. Mayor Bing added that when both the Police and Fire Departments complete their moves that 1300 Beaubien and 250 West Larned would be put up for sale by the city.
