= Detroiter (fireboat) =

Detroit's first fireboat

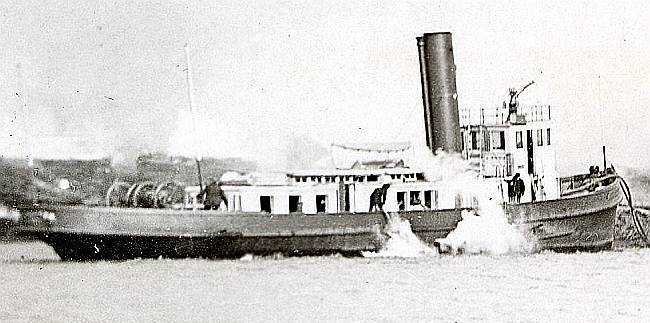
- Detroiter in River Rouge, Michigan, c. 1901

History

United States
- Name: Detroiter
- Owner: Detroit Fire Department
- Builder: Craig Shipbuilding
- Launched: May 16, 1893
- In service: 1893
- Out of service: 1902
- Identification: US official number 157370
- Fate: Sold in 1903

Canada
- Name: Sarnia City
- Owner: Reid Wrecking and Towing Company
- In service: 1909
- Out of service: 1942
- Identification: Canada official number 126227
- Fate: Dismantled in 1942

General characteristics
- Type: Fireboat
- Tonnage: 138.57 GT, 69.29 NT
- Length: 105 ft (32 m)
- Beam: 25.42 ft (7.75 m)
- Draft: 10.33 ft (3.15 m)
- Crew: 12

Detroiter was the Detroit Fire Department's first fireboat, built in 1893 by Craig Shipbuilding. With 12 crewmembers, she was equipped with two coal-powered engines, double-acting pumps on each side which could pump 6,000 gallons per minute, and 3 sets of hoses ranging from 1,000 to 2,000 feet in length. She served as a Detroit fireboat for a few years before developing dry rot, with her equipment later being transferred to James R. Elliot in 1902. She was rebuilt as a wrecking tug and renamed to Sarnia City when her hull was sold to the Reid Wrecking and Towing Company in 1903, where she remained in service until being dismantled in 1942.

== History ==
Detroiter was built in 1893 by Craig Shipbuilding at Toledo, Ohio, launching on May 16, 1893 and enrolling on June 20, 1893. On November 25, 1893, she assisted in a fire at Edson, Moore & Company. On April 16, 1894, she fought a fire aboard the steam barge Burlington, whose crew survived despite the vessel sinking. On August 3, 1894, she helped prevent the spread of a fire at a planing mill and lumber yard along the Detroit, Grand Haven and Milwaukee Railway.

After a few years of service, she began to develop dry rot. In November 1902, she was stripped of her fire-fighting equipment to build the Detroit Fire Department's third fireboat, James R. Elliott. In 1903, her hull was sold to the Reid Wrecking and Towing Company and rebuilt in Sarnia, Ontario as a wrecking tug named Sarnia City. She was involved in the salvaging of Mataafa in 1905–06, the salvaging of William C. Moreland in 1910–11, the discovery of Charles S. Price on behalf of the Lake Carriers Association in November 1913, and the salvaging of Howard M. Hanna Jr. in 1913–14. She was rescued on October 8, 1930 after running aground near Long Point, Ontario, and was eventually dismantled by Sincennes-McNaughton Line in 1942.
