= Sivad Heshimu Johnson =

American firefighter (1970–2020)

Sivad Johnson
- Born: Sivad Heshimu Johnson; September 5, 1970; Detroit, Michigan, U.S.
- Died: August 21, 2020 (aged 49); Detroit
- Occupation: Firefighter

Sivad Heshimu Johnson (September 5, 1970 - August 21, 2020) was an American firefighter. He worked for 26 years at the Detroit Fire Department.

== Life ==
In 2017, the Detroit Fire Department awarded Sergeant Johnson its Medal of Honor. Johnson's father and brother also served as firefighters.

On April 16, 2019, Johnson provided a first person account of being trapped, while trying to rescue a civilian from a house fire.

Johnson was also an artist and motivational speaker. Johnson's name Sivad is Davis, backwards, a way to honor his mother, whose maiden name was Davis.

== Death ==
Johnson died while trying to save three children from drowning, on August 21, 2020.

Johnson was off-duty, visiting Belle Isle with his daughter, when he heard the cries of three sisters. Johnson and other on-lookers dived in. The girls were saved, but Johnson drowned; his body was found the next day. Click on Detroit reported that he may have been swept away by a rip current.

== Legacy ==
On August 31, 2020, Detroit introduced a new fireboat and announced that the new vessel would be named Sivad Johnson.
