= Rescue squad =

Emergency service that provides technical rescue services

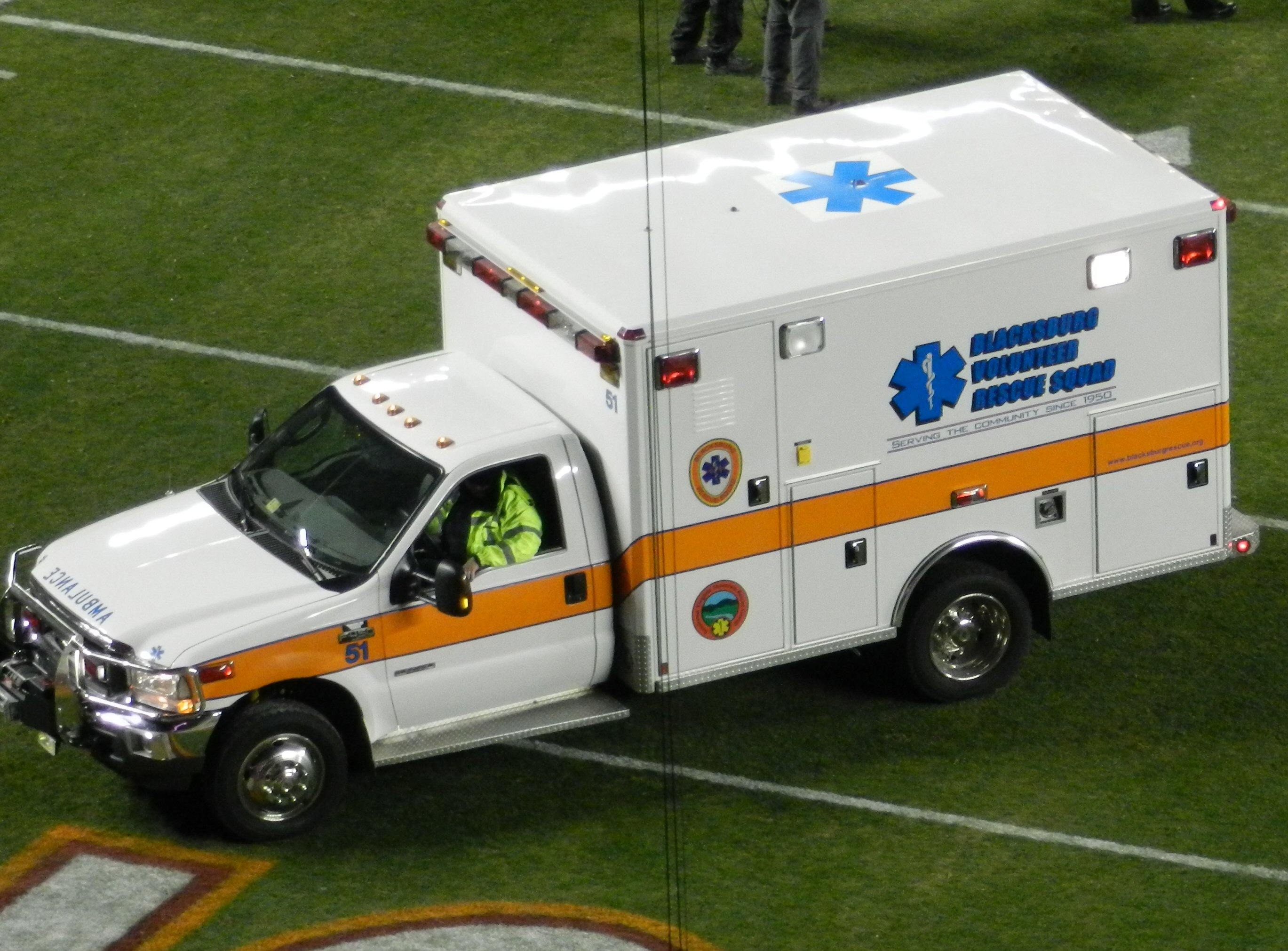
A rescue squad ambulance operated by Blacksburg Volunteer Rescue Squad in 2012

A rescue squad is an emergency service that provides technical rescue services, and may additionally provide emergency medical services and firefighting services. Rescue squads may be standalone organizations or an integrated part of fire departments or emergency medical services.

A rescue squad provides basic life support or advanced life support to critically ill or injured patients, typically operating from ambulances, squad trucks, nontransporting EMS vehicles, or aircraft. They may also operate from heavy rescue vehicles or rescue boats.

Depending on the requirements and scope of the rescue squad, the staff of such agencies may possess certification as emergency medical responder, emergency medical technician, firefighter, search and rescue certifications and training, or other specific technical rescue certifications and specialties.

== See also ==
- Extrication
- Rescue vehicle
