= Curtis Randolph (fireboat) =

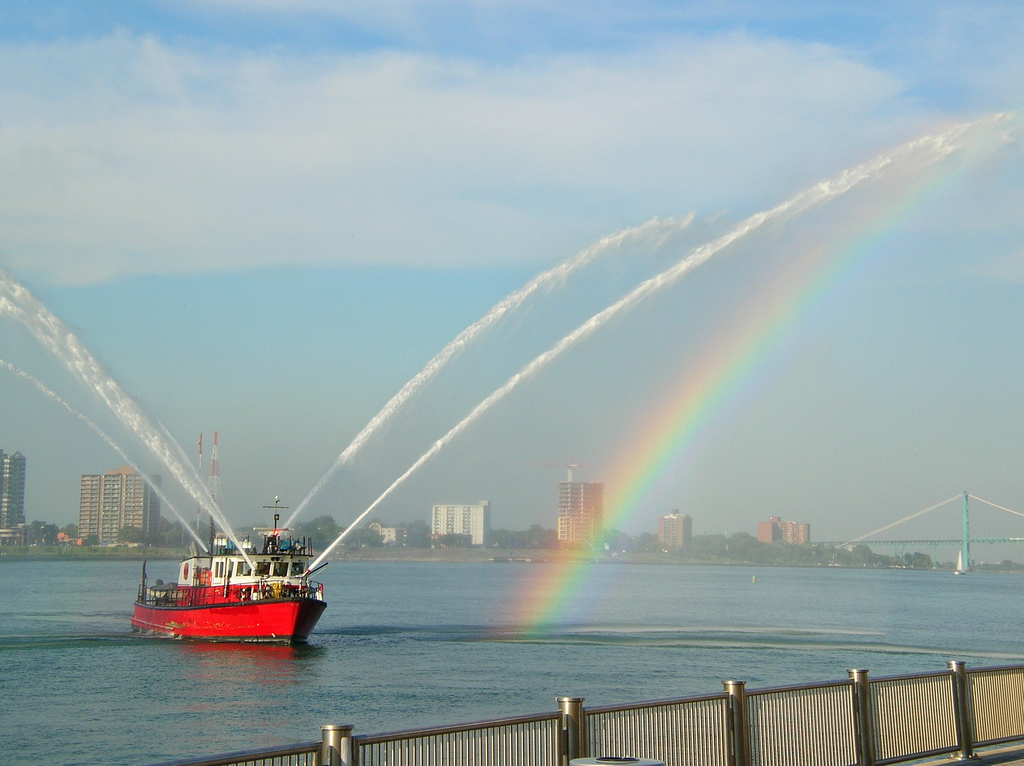
Detroit fireboat Curtis Randolph

Curtis Randolph is a fireboat operated by the Detroit Fire Department. The 74.58-foot (22.73 m) vessel was launched in 1979, and is named after a young firefighter who died in the line of duty in 1977. Mayor Coleman A. Young commissioned the vessel. According to the Detroit Public Safety Foundation it is the "only Class A fireboat on the waterways between Chicago and Cleveland."

The boat can pump 11,000 gallons per minute. The Curtis Randolph replaced the John Kendall, an older vessel that required a crew of ten, including five men whose sole responsibility was to stoke the steam engines.

Detroit's economic decline has eroded the Fire Department's equipment maintenance budget. The Curtis Randolph was unavailable for much of 2006 due to delays in crucial repairs. On February 19, 2015, Fox News's Detroit station reported that although in previous years the United States Coast Guard had moved the vessel from its mooring in the Detroit River in October to prevent ice damage, the board still had not been removed. On August 24, 2016, the Curtis Randolph was loaned to help fight a fire at a power plant in St. Clair, Michigan, 60 miles (97 km) away. It was the vessel's most distant assignment. The boat's pumps supplied water to four fire engines. It took the Curtis Randolph four hours to travel to the fire.

== See also ==
- Fireboats of Detroit
