= 1863 Detroit race riot =

Instance of civil unrest

Detroit race riot of 1863
- Part of American Civil War
- Date: March 8, 1863
- Location: Detroit, Michigan
- Result: Creation of full-time police force

Casualties
- Deaths: 2

The Detroit race riot of 1863 occurred on March 6, 1863, in the city of Detroit, Michigan, during the American Civil War. At the time, the Detroit Free Press reported these events as "the bloodiest day that ever dawned upon Detroit." It began due to unrest among the working class related to racism and the military draft, which was heightened after the Emancipation Proclamation was issued by President Abraham Lincoln. Based in a free state, some recent immigrants and other workers resented being drafted for a war that they thought was waged for the benefit of slaves in the Southern United States, and they feared competition from Black people.

At least two civilians were killed, one white and one Black, and numerous others, mostly African Americans, were badly beaten and injured. In total, 35 buildings were destroyed by fire, with many others damaged, and Black residents lost property and cash to the looting and stealing of the mob. Losses were estimated at minimum US$15,000 to as much as US$20,000 (equivalent to US$522,973 in 2025). More than 200 people, mostly Black, were left homeless. Although the Michigan Legislature recommended compensation, the Detroit City Council refused to approve it. As a result of the riot, the city of Detroit established a full-time police force, which was dominated by whites into the late 20th century.

== Background ==
During the months preceding the riot, social tensions rose in the city. It had a white majority but a thriving black community, made up both of free black people who had migrated there and refugee slaves who had fled the South. Located just across the Detroit River from Canada, which had abolished slavery in 1834, the city was a major "station" on the Underground Railroad in the antebellum years. Some fugitive slaves chose to settle in Detroit, since Michigan was a non-slave state.

The City Council was dominated by Democrats, and many of the Irish and German immigrants belonged to that party. The Detroit Free Press was a Democratic Party paper that was opposed to President Abraham Lincoln's conduct of the American Civil War and its increasing demand for recruits. The newspaper advocated white supremacy and was pro-labor. In the months leading up to the riot, the newspaper frequently published articles connecting "blacks to labor problems, blacks to citizenship issues, blacks to the war, and blacks to crime and a general degradation of the moral order", stressing how they were a threat to working-class white men and their limited power. Following the Emancipation Proclamation of January 1863, the newspaper published articles that frequently opposed the interests of blacks.

By contrast, the Detroit Advertiser and Tribune largely spoke for the Republican Party, supporting abolitionism and the war as a just cause. It criticized the Free Press for inciting the riot by inflaming passions and agitating against blacks. For a month after the riot, the Advertiser and Tribune published articles referring to the "Free Press Mob".

Three days prior to the beginning of the riots, Congress passed the Enrollment Act which required single men age 20 to 45 and married men up to age 35 to register for the draft. This act angered many northern whites, mainly Irish immigrants who had accepted U.S. citizenship, not realizing that citizenship also made immigrants liable for the draft. Fuel was added to the fire of their anger when black men, mostly freed slaves, were excluded from this same draft. The Irish feared that newly freed slaves from the South would migrate to the North and create further competition in the labor market. Many Irish saw this as a "rich man's war and a poor man's fight" since the policies of substitution and commutation were controversial practices which allowed drafted citizens to opt out of service by either furnishing a suitable substitute to take the place of those drafted, or pay $300 each. Both of these provisions were created with the intention of softening the effect of the draft on pacifiers, the anti-draft movement and the propertied classes. The result however was general public resentment which then turned to fury.

== Events ==
A mixed-race man, Thomas Faulkner, was arrested for allegedly molesting a young white girl and tried in court. Although Faulkner had voted regularly (a privilege reserved to whites) and identified as Spanish-Indian, both newspapers described him as "negro", and that was how the whites came to regard him.

The trial attracted volatile crowds of whites, who threw items at Faulkner and guards as he was escorted to and from the court. The second day of the trial, whites started to attack blacks outside the courthouse. The commander of the Provost Guard escorting Faulkner ordered the firing of blanks to push back the crowd. Next, live ammunition was fired (although it is not clear that the commander ordered it). A white civilian named Charles Langer who observed the rioting was killed. The crowd was enraged that a German was killed at the trial of a man they considered less worthy.

They immediately started attacking black civilians on the street and went to a nearby known black business, a cooper's shop. Workers tried to defend it, but the mob burned the shop and adjacent house, threatening black women and children inside. They attacked the five men who escaped from the flames, severely wounding Joshua Boyd (an escaped slave from the South; he had been saving his earnings in order to buy his wife and children out of slavery). He was later beaten more by the mob and died four days later. Although grievously wounded, the other four men survived, as did the women and children. Some were aided by whites.

Survivors said the mob attacked black businesses and houses, looting them of anything valuable and stealing from the residents. The whites eventually moved beyond the black area into poor white areas, continuing the destruction. Some blacks fled the area, going across the Detroit River to Canada or west to what was then the independent community of Corktown. The city finally ordered in troops from Ypsilanti and Fort Wayne and by 11 p.m. had suppressed the violence. More than 200 blacks and some whites had lost their homes to the destruction. There was an estimated $15,000 to 20,000 in property damage, mostly suffered by blacks.

== Aftermath ==
Faulkner was convicted and sentenced to prison for life. After serving seven years in prison, the two girls, who two months after the trial were jailed on larceny charges and who testified falsely against him, recanted their accusations, and Faulkner was pardoned. He returned to Detroit, where some white businessmen helped him start a produce business.

The city held an inquiry on the death of Boyd, but no one was prosecuted for his death. Although the Michigan Legislature encouraged compensation for the victims of the riot, the Detroit City Council, dominated by Democrats, refused to do so. These tax-paying citizens, who had not been protected and whose property had been stolen and destroyed, were left to recover and remake their lives on their own.

As a result of the riot, the city established a full-time police force. It was dominated by ethnic whites into the late 20th century. This became a civil rights issue, as the city's minority population had been closed out of the force.

== See also ==
- Great Lakes Patrol
- Detroit race riot of 1943
- 1967 Detroit riot
- List of incidents of civil unrest in the United States
