= Squad truck =

Rescue vehicle designed to transport the tools, equipment, and personnel

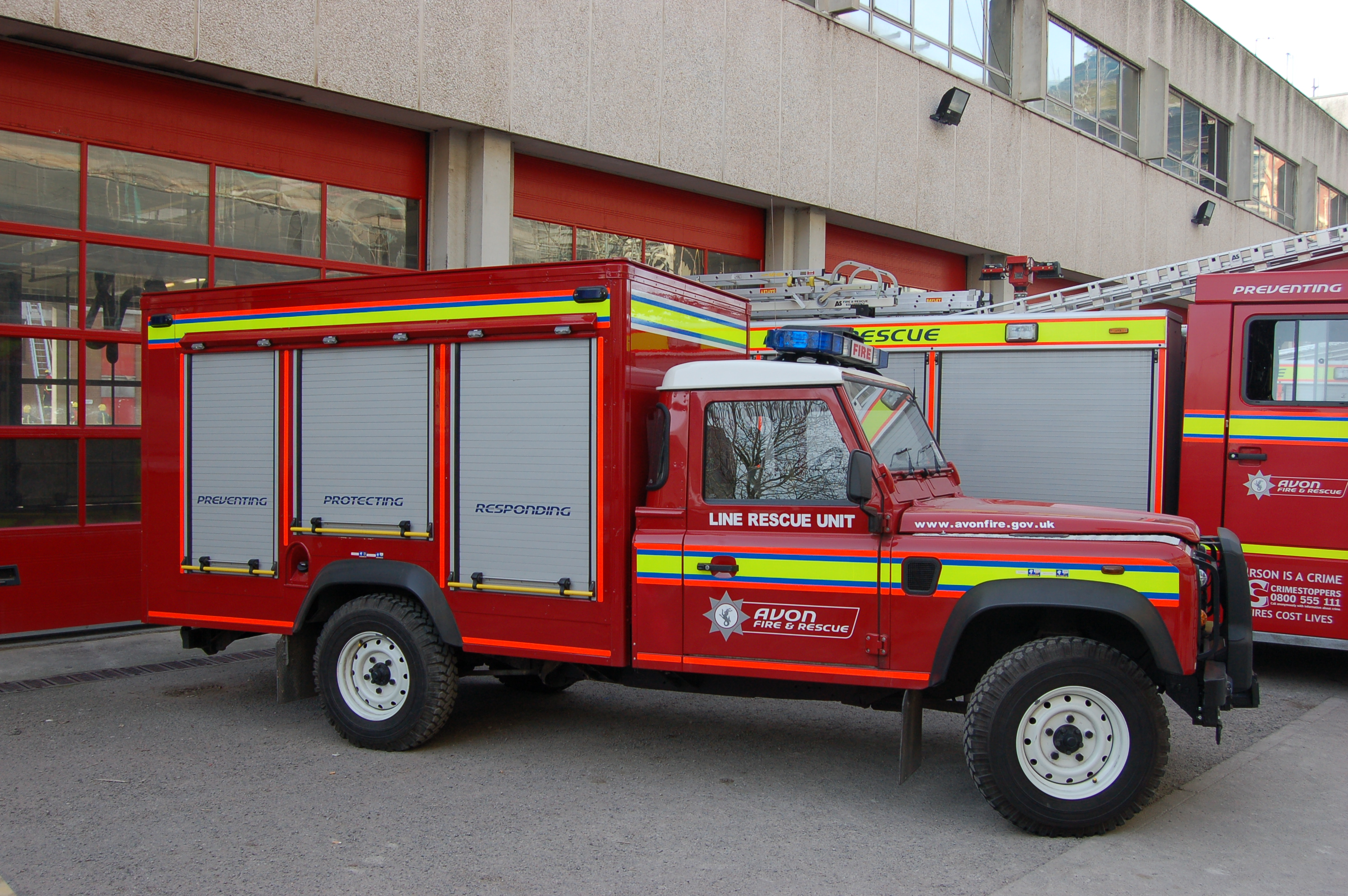
Avon Fire and Rescue Service's line rescue Land Rover parked outside Temple fire station in Bristol.

Most often a squad truck is a rescue vehicle designed to transport the necessary tools, equipment, and personnel to perform a vehicle extrication at the scene of an entrapment.

The squad truck assignment is variable, by department and region, so assigning specific types of apparatus or tasks is very difficult.

== Vehicle construction ==
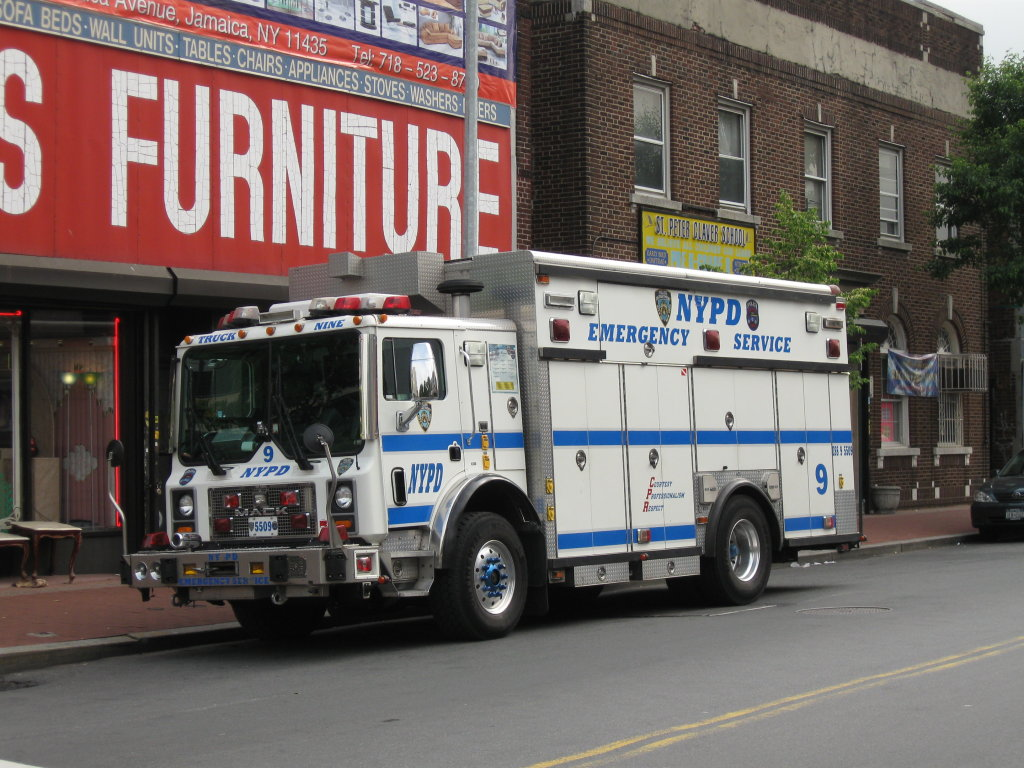
NYPD ESU Heavy Rescue Truck 9

The design of squad trucks varies, depending on the geography and need in any given area. Areas with rough terrain or snow usually have squad trucks with four-wheel drive, jake brake, locking differentials, hydraulic brakes, and aggressive tires. Often, squads trucks are old ambulances that have been stripped to carry the necessary tools and equipment needed for an extrication, however, rescue squads or fire departments with a high amount of funding often purchase custom trucks that are more elaborate and functional squad trucks. As such, the size of squad trucks is varying, and can be classified into three distinct categories. Class I, or light duty squad trucks are the smallest, and usually the cheapest squad trucks. They can range from a converted ambulance or Chevy Suburban type truck, to custom built trucks on Ford F550 chassis. Class II, or medium duty squad trucks are substantially bigger in both the physical size of the truck and its weight. Medium duty squad trucks can range from smaller fire engines specifically designed for extrications to International truck cabs and chassis. Class III, or heavy duty squad trucks are usually the dimensions of a full sized fire engine and often include more exotic tools such as cascade systems and plasma torches.

== Tools and equipment ==
The tools and equipment listed below are many of the tools found on squad trucks, though the size, amount, and combination of these tools depends on both the size of the truck and the needs of the community in which the truck serves. This is a general list as many squad trucks have more tools and equipment not listed.

- Hydraulic rescue tools ("Jaws of Life"), designed to spread, cut, and ram various elements of a car
- An airbag system, designed to lift a car off the ground to gain access to the underside
- Generator, to supply power to lights and other electronic appliances
- A Glas-Master tool to break open and cut out windows
- A reciprocating saw, to cut through the sheet metal or siding on a car
- Halligan bar
- Axe
- Cascade storage system
- Plasma torch
- Light tower
- Winch
- Rope and accessories (carabiners, harnesses, pulleys, etc.)
- Backboards
- Traffic cones and flares
- Comealongs and chains
- EMS supplies
- Cribbing
- Mass casualty kit
