= Detroit Fire Department =

U.S. local government agency

City of Detroit Fire Department

Operational area
- Country: United States
- State: Michigan
- City: Detroit

Agency overview
- Established: 1867
- Annual calls: EMS: 146,551 (2022); Fire: 23,184 Fire / 30,908 Medical (2022)
- Employees: 1200+ (821 firefighters)
- Staffing: Career
- Commissioner: Charles Simms
- EMS level: ALS/BLS/MFR
- IAFF: Local 344

Facilities and equipment
- Divisions: 7 (Fire, EMS, Fire Marshal, Fire Investigations, Training, Communications, Community Relations)
- Battalions: 8
- Stations: 36
- Engines: 27
- Trucks: 13
- Squads: 6
- Ambulances: 27
- HAZMAT: 2
- Airport crash: 2
- Fireboats: 2

Website
- detroitmi.gov/fire
- IAFF Local 344

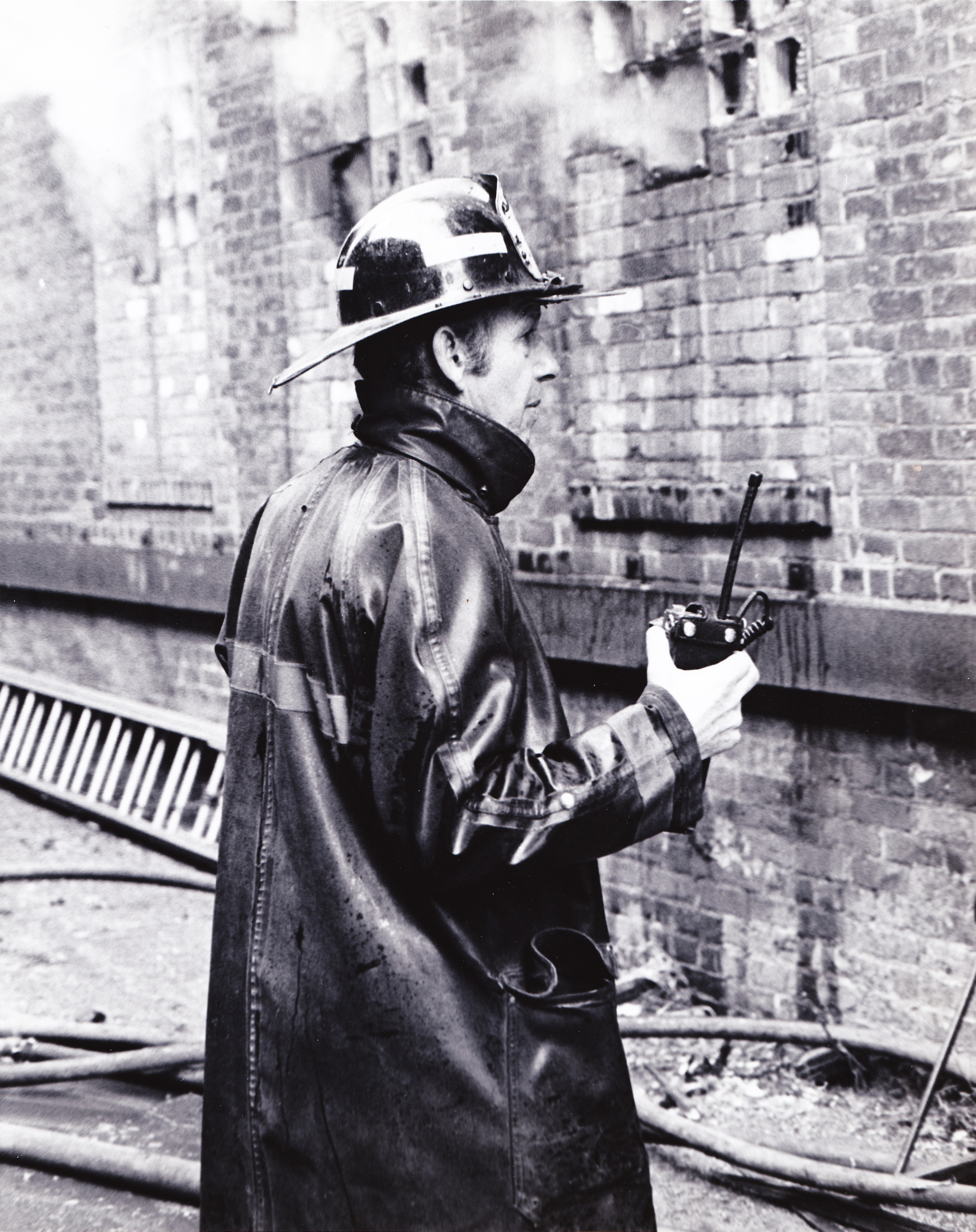
A DFD Captain overseeing a fire, c. 1978.

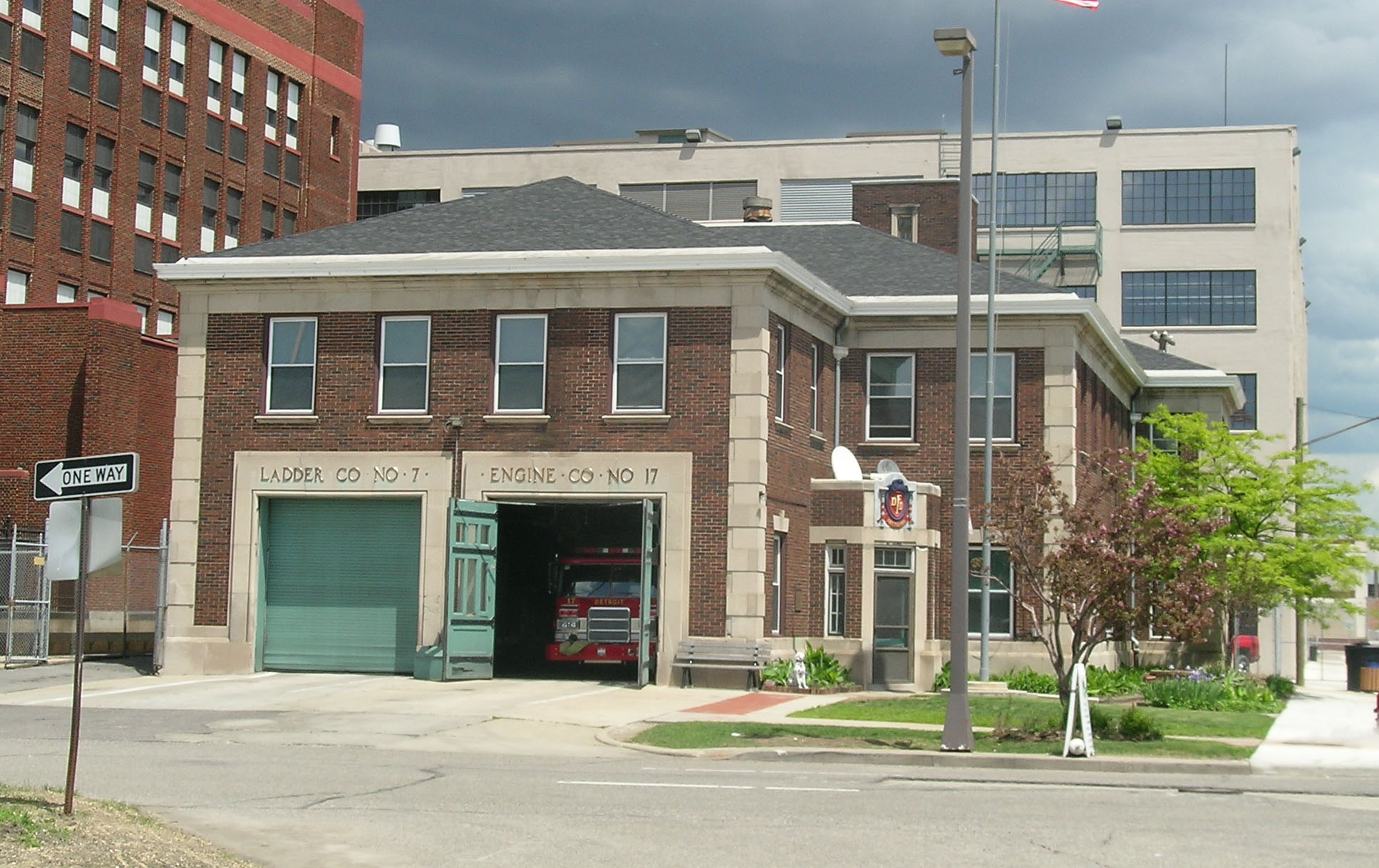
The quarters of Engine 17, Ladder 7, and Chief 5 at 6100 2nd Ave.

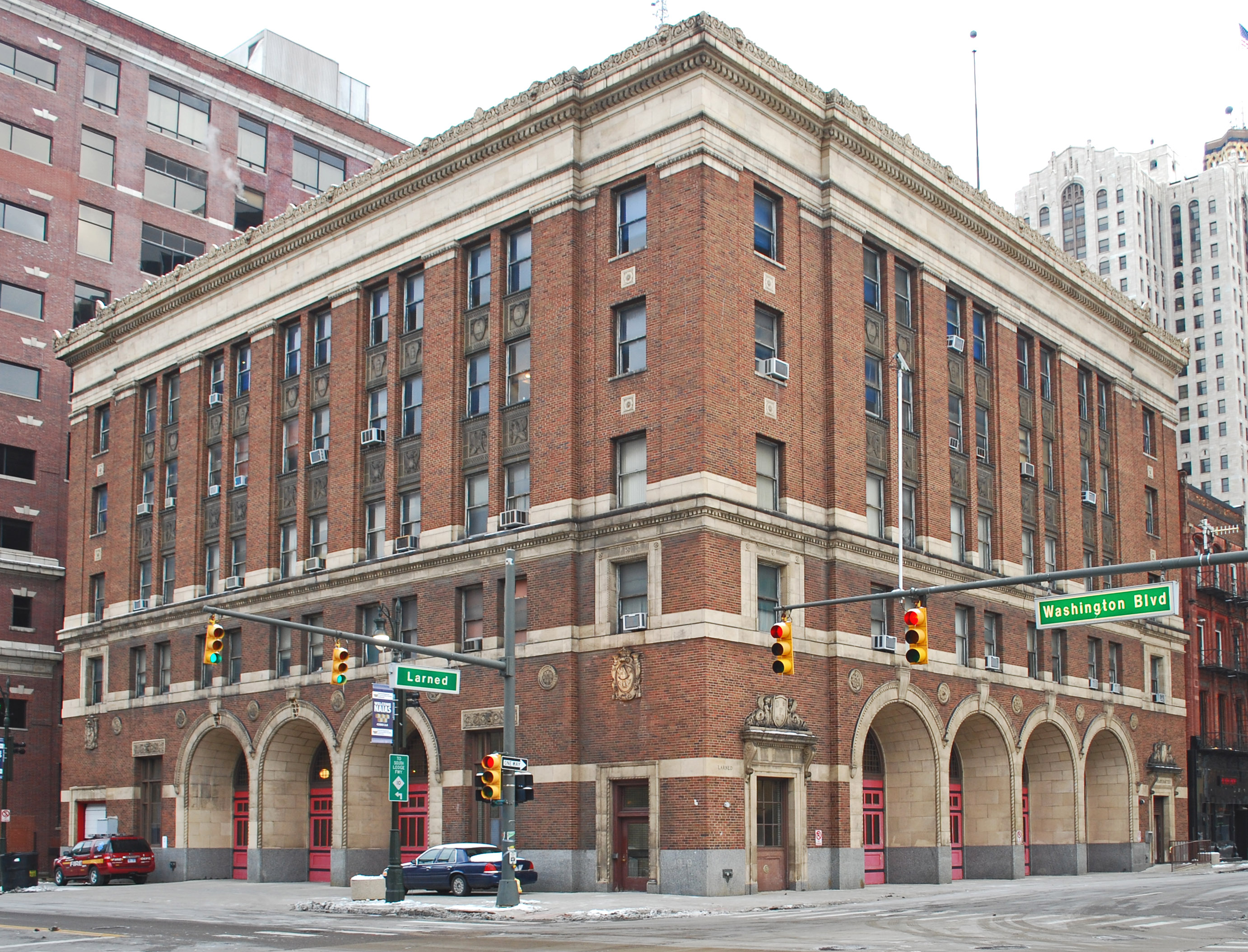
The former Fire Headquarters at 250 West Larned, in operation until 2013

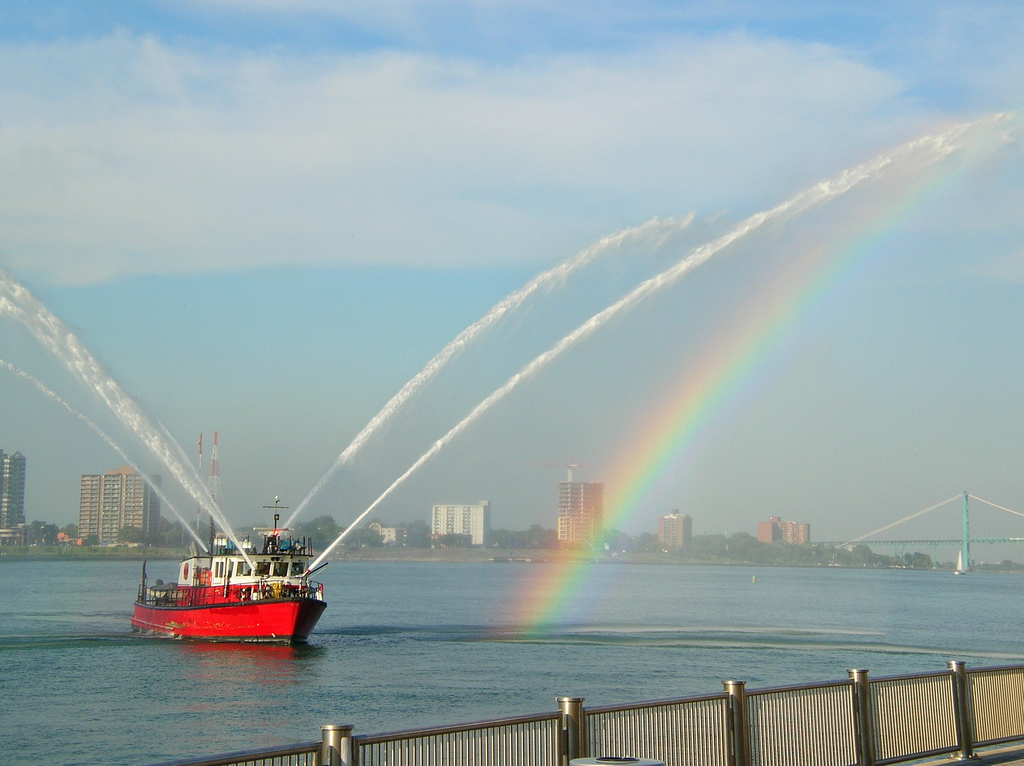
Fireboat Curtis Randolph

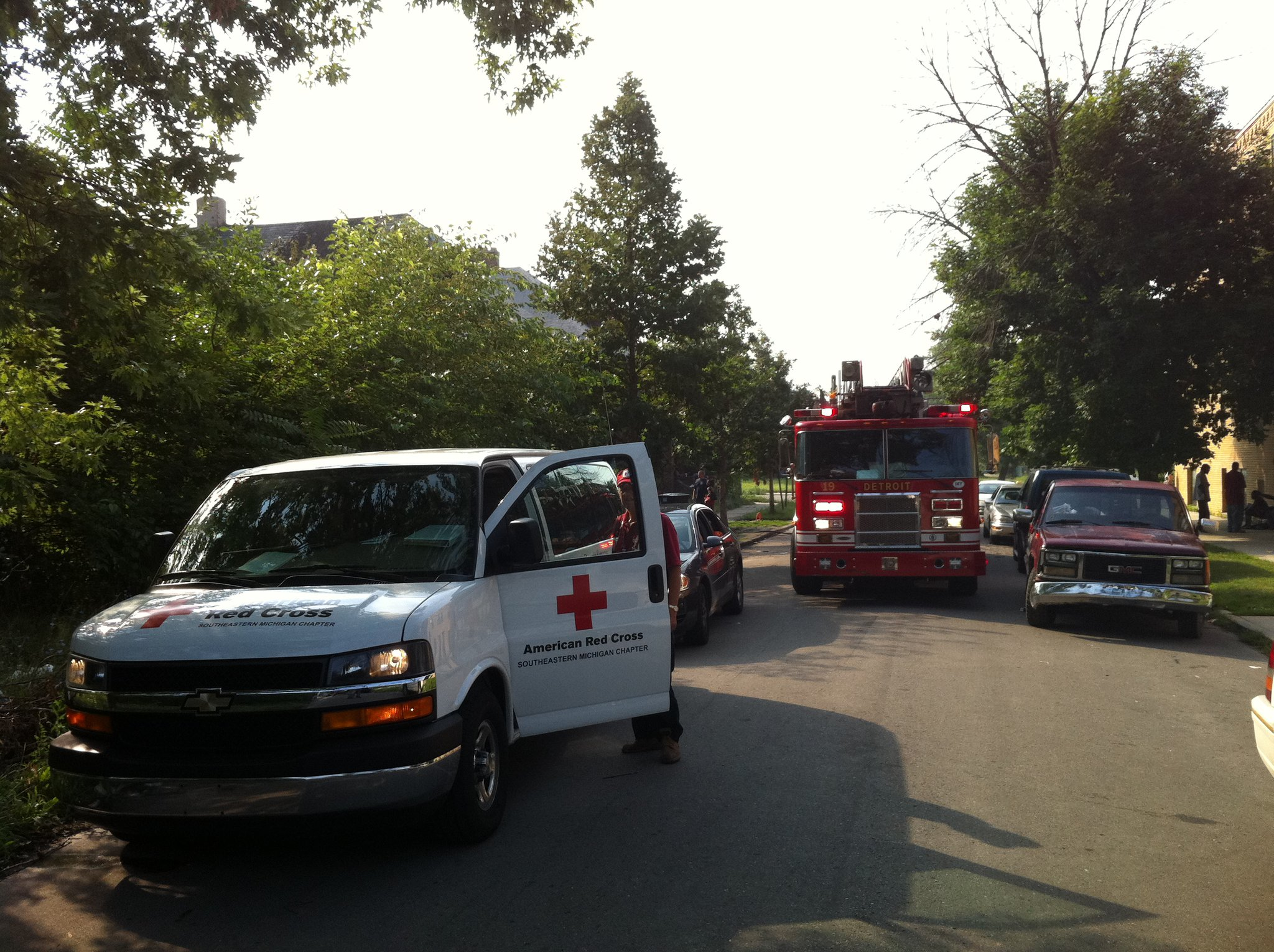
DFD Ladder 19 and an American Red Cross Disaster Action Team van at the scene of a house fire in Detroit.

The City of Detroit Fire Department, commonly known as the Detroit Fire Department (DFD), is the municipal full-service fire department and emergency medical service of the city of Detroit, Michigan, United States.

The DFD operates 47 fire companies and 25 ambulances out of 36 fire stations located throughout the city, with a total sworn personnel complement of 1200 members. It is headquartered at the Detroit Public Safety Headquarters on Third Street, which also houses the Detroit Police Department and additional services.

The DFD responds to approximately 170,000 emergency calls annually, with over 80% being medical emergencies and approximately 2200 working structural fires. There were 4,741 structure fires in Detroit in 2014, compared with 2,736 in 2018, according to data. By the end of 2022, there were 2154 structure fires. As a result, the city is now fighting an average of six structure fires per day. As of 2021, all new members are trained as firefighter/EMT or firefighter/paramedic.

== History ==
=== Volunteer fire department ===
Prior to the creation of the fire department, Detroit relied on bucket brigades, with sparsely enforced regulations in place, exacerbating the Great Fire of 1805. In December 1825, the then trading post received its first significant fire engine. By 1844, Detroit had four fire engine companies, two independent hose companies, and one hook and ladder company. During the Detroit race riot of 1863, the fire department faced its most significant challenge at that point, fighting for more than nine hours. With the advent of steam fire engines, the fire department disbanded all of its hand engine companies on February 17, 1865. By June 1865, Detroit had 5 steam fire engines, whose crew were paid.

=== Professional fire department ===
On March 26, 1867, the bill creating Detroit's first fire commission was passed, establishing the Detroit Fire Department as a professional organization. In 1886, the Fire Department Horse Bureau was established, with more than 100 horses in service by 1892. Two engine companies were sent by train to help fight the Great Chicago Fire. The department obtained its first fire engine vehicle in October 1908, leading to the replacement of all steam fire engines by April 1922.

=== Department leadership in the 2010s ===
From 2011 to December 31, 2013, the Detroit Fire Department was led by Fire Commissioner Donald R. Austin, a former member of the Los Angeles Fire Department and a Detroit native. Under Mayor Dave Bing, Austin had come to Detroit in May 2011 on the difficult mission to bring change to the DFD. He resigned in November 2013 due to changes in city administration.

The new mayor of Detroit, Mike Duggan, named Jonathan Jackson, a 25-year veteran of the department, and a Second Deputy Fire Commissioner under Austin, as the Interim Fire Commissioner on December 23, 2013. Craig Dougherty, a former member of Engine 50 on the city's East Side and Fire Chief under Austin, became a Second Deputy Commissioner under Jackson. The administration was rounded out by Deputy Commissioner Edsel Jenkins, C.P.A., Second Deputy Commissioner Sydney Zack, LL.M., and Second Deputy Commissioner Orlando Gregory.

By the end of March 2014, Commissioner Jackson resigned due to a life-threatening neural disease. On April 8, 2014, Deputy Commissioner Edsel Jenkins was named as the new Executive Fire Commissioner. He resigned in October 2015, and was succeeded in office by Eric Jones. Executive Fire Commissioner Eric Jones made swift changes and created the new management team of the fire department which included Deputy Commissioner Dave Fornell, 2nd Deputy Commissioner Sydney Zack, and 2nd Deputy Commissioner Charles Simms.

In 2022, Charles Simms was appointed as Interim Fire Commissioner, later becoming the permanent Executive Fire Commissioner in 2023. During his tenure, significant achievements included restructuring the department, resulting in record-low EMS response times, acquiring updated equipment and apparatus, cross-training EMS personnel for firefighting roles, and implementing aggressive hiring initiatives. In July 2023, the department hired 100 Firefighter/EMTs, followed by an additional 27 in September 2023. Simms' executive leadership team comprised 2nd Deputy Commissioners Reginald Jenkins, Derek Holman, and Robert Stokes, alongside Director Anthony Watts.

Detroit Fire Department currently has an ISO score of 2 and is striving to gain the score of 1 by 2025.

=== Budget crisis of the 2010s ===
As of January 2011, in an effort to reduce costs, the city of Detroit was considering privatizing the Fire Department's EMS Division.

Budget cuts led to the Chief of department closing a total of 10 Engine Companies and 4 Ladder Companies, effective July 4, 2012. Additionally, 200 firefighters and officers were to be demoted and around 150 laid off initially, with more than 100 to be re-hired as funds were to become available. In addition to the 14 permanently closed companies, a number of units were placed out of service ("browned out") on a daily basis. As a consequence, the standard response to a structural fire was reduced by one engine to 2 engines, 1 ladder, 1 squad and 1 chief.

At the beginning and into the first half of 2013, apparatus availability was at a low point. An estimated 40 units remained in service, with all three aerial platform trucks damaged or defective, and up to eight engine Companies and seven ladder companies browned out. At the end of January 2013, the entire fleet of aerial ladder trucks was found lacking certification for routine operations.

The City of Detroit declared bankruptcy in July 2013.

By 2014, the established practice of using improvised tools like soda pop cans, doorbells, door hinges or pipes to alert firefighters of incoming alarm faxes made national news. Merely 48 pieces of apparatus were available for service, down from 66 in the year 2010. A number of ladder trucks continued to be pressed into service without working aerials.

=== Post-bankruptcy ===
In December 2014, the City of Detroit emerged from bankruptcy protection. Funds for replacement and maintenance of parts of the aging fleet and facilities were included with the new budget. Mutual aid arrangements with fire departments in the two enclaves, the cities of Highland Park and Hamtramck, were formalized in October 2014.

In 2015, with a first batch of ten new fire engines going in service. Previously browned out Engine Company 32 was also reopened. New vehicles bolstered the fleet available to EMS and for fire investigators.

Following 2012's reduction, the standard assignment to a structure fire was again increased to 3 Engines, 1 Truck, 1 Squad and 1 Chief. In 2016, an expanded type of first alarm assignment called Commercial Box Alarm was introduced to better handle fires in structures bigger than a standard dwelling. Six new fire engines were placed in service in 2016, one of them replacing the Quint at Engine Company 48, plus reinstating Ladder Company 13 as a permanently staffed unit. So far, Engine Companies 1, 9, 17, 27, 30, 32, 33, 39, 40, 42, 48, 50, 53, 56, 58, and 59 have all been assigned new Smeal fire apparatus.

For the year 2017, six new HME/Ahrens-Fox Squad trucks, nine Smeal rearmount ladder trucks, two Ferrara platform ladder trucks, eight Ferrara fire engines, fourteen Braun Medic Units and a number of Light and Air units are scheduled to enter service. In 2022, 6 new Smeal engines and 10 new ambulances were placed in service making all frontline fire trucks and ambulances 8 years or newer.

For the year of 2023, Detroit Fire Department responds daily to provide exemplary services to the citizen and visitors of Detroit with a fleet consisting of 27 engines, 13 ladder trucks including 2 platforms, 6 squads, 42 ambulances, 2 Haz Mat vehicles, and an airport rescue engine. 10 new Smeal engines will arrive in fall of 2023 which will replace all the 2015 frontline engines. With this allotment of engines, all frontline apparatus will be 2017 or newer.

TRAINING Since July 2021, all new members will be trained as a Firefighter/EMT or Firefighter/Paramedic prior to graduating the academy. Starting in 2022 each member will cycle through the Regional Training Academy to satisfy 24 hours of training annually in conjunction with daily in service training at every firehouse. All officers are required to satisfy requirements in Officer I and Officer II prior to becoming an officer. The Detroit Regional Training Academy is the hub for southeastern Michigan and trains department members as well as outside agencies by using state of the art technology including simulators for driving and medical response scenarios. A new burn tower and flashover container was purchased to simulate live fire situations. Smart boards were also installed in all classrooms.

Community Engagement The Detroit Fire Department Community Relations Division implemented the Save A Life Initiative in 2022 that includes training every 8th grader in Detroit Hands Only CPR annually. Ensuring within a 10 year span that every residence in Detroit has working smoke and carbon monoxide detectors. In 2023, the department also implemented the "Community AED" program to ensure an AED is strategically placed in public venues throughout the city to increase the survival rate of cardiac arrest victims. Weekly CPR classes are offered to citizens of Detroit and all employees of the City of Detroit. Detroit educates over 35000 citizens annually in fire safety and installs over 2000 smoke and CO detectors annually.

=== Fire activity and investigation ===
Prior to bankruptcy, the city of Detroit had to cope with a large number of fires. The number of vacant buildings throughout the city, combined with a dire economic situation, resulted in numerous fires on a daily basis. About 85% of the fires that occur daily in Detroit occur in vacant homes and buildings. In 2011 alone, the DFD responded to over 9,000 working structural fires.

A large number of these fires are believed to be "incendiary" (or arson) (Note: An "Incendiary Fire" is a technical definition for "a fire that is deliberately set with the intent to cause a fire to occur in an area where the fire should not be". "Arson" is and a statutory definition for a criminal offense. There are occasions where a fire may be "incendiary", but not meet the threshold of "arson".), far above the national average of about 7.8%. In the early 2010s, there were no accurate statistics for determining the arson rate in Detroit due to the fact that only a fraction of the fires could be investigated by the limited resources of the DFD Arson Unit. Only fire scenes which have been investigated can be ruled as incendiary or arson fires. Those fires which have not been investigated must be classified as "undetermined" unless an investigation is completed.

Numbers of fires per year declined subsequently, with 4,600 structure fires in 2014 and 3,700 in 2015. On average, Detroit firefighters attended to 11 to 16 fires per day in 2015. By the end of 2015, 8 police officers were added to the Fire Investigation Unit of 16 Fire Investigators bringing the total to 24 members. By the end of 2022, there was a drastic decrease to 2154 structure fires.

== Operations ==
The Detroit Fire Department is divided into 7 divisions: Communications, Community Relations, Emergency Medical Services (EMS), Firefighting Operations, Fire Marshal, Fire Investigations and Training.

=== Emergency Medical Services ===
The DFD operates a separate Emergency Medical Services Division. In September 2013, Automated External Defibrillators (AED devices) were put in service on the fire apparatus as a first step into performing life support to citizens as first responders. As of 2015, Detroit firefighters are trained medical first responders and have the ability to handle patient care until Emergency Medical Services units arrive.

The Emergency Medical Services division operates with limited manpower. As a result, many calls are handled by the DFD until a unit is available. The availability of Emergency Medical Services units is often compromised due to the number of calls in a city which has a lot of violence, citizens calling 911 for non-emergencies, as well as the breaking down of the Emergency Medical Services rigs due to age, mileage, and lack of proper maintenance.

Thanks to Mayor Bing's collaboration with the business community, Roger Penske sponsored 23 new ambulances for the department, which were put into service in the summer of 2013. Many of these, however, soon developed defects. More new ambulances were purchased throughout the following years.

=== Fire station locations ===
As of February 2019, there are a total of 38 fire stations in the city of Detroit, not including the Fire Headquarters. There are 27 Engine Companies, 13 Ladder Companies, 6 Tactical Mobile Squads, 2 Fireboats, and 2 Hazardous Material Response Units as well as 24 Medic Ambulances and several specialized units. These fire stations and companies are organized into 8 battalions, each headed by one Battalion Chief each shift.

Engine Company	Ladder Company	Medic unit	Specialized Unit	Battalion Chief Unit	Battalion	Location
Engine 1					1	111 Montcalm
Engine 9	Ladder 6 (Platform)	Medic 21			1	3737 E Lafayette
Engine 16 (Curtis Randolph) (Fire Boat-1)						40 24th St
Engine 16 (Sivad Johnson) (Fire Boat-2)						40 24th St
Engine 17	Ladder 7 (Platform)			Battalion Chief 5	5	6100 Second Ave
Engine 27	Ladder 8	Medic 19		Battalion Chief 7	7	4700 Fort St
Engine 30		Medic 3			4	16543 Meyers Rd
Engine 32		Medic 23		Battalion Chief 6	6	11740 E Jefferson
Engine 33	Ladder 13				7	1041 Lawndale
Engine 34					2	6345 Livernois
Engine 35		Medic 20			5	111 Kenilworth St
Engine 37		Medic 09			7	2820 Central
Engine 39		Medic 1			5	8700 14th St
Engine 40	Ladder 17 (Platform)	Medic 10			8	13939 Dexter
Engine 41		Medic 14			6	5000 Rohns
Engine 42		Medic 02 Medic 26			2	6324 W Chicago
Engine 44	Ladder 18			Battalion Chief 8	8	35 W 7 Mile
Engine 46					3	10101 Knodell
Engine 48		Medic 11			7	2300 S Fort St
Engine 50	Ladder 23	Medic 15		Battalion Chief 3	3	12985 Houston-
Engine 52	Ladder 31				6	5029 Manistique St
Engine 53	Ladder 25	Medic 17 Medic 27			4	15127 Greenfield
Engine 54	Ladder 26	Medic 04			4	16825 Trinity
Engine 55	Ladder 27	Medic 05 Medic 25		Battalion Chief 2	2	18140 Joy Rd
Engine 56		Medic 16			8	18601 Ryan Rd
Engine 57					2	13960 Burt Rd
Engine 58		Medic 24			3	10801 Whittier
Engine 59		Medic 22	Squad 01	Battalion Chief 4	4	17800 Curtis
Engine 60		Medic 28			3	19701 Hoover
	Ladder 20	Medic 06	Squad 02		1	433 W Alexandrine
			Squad 03 Tac 02		6	1818 E Grand Blvd
		Medic 07	Squad 04		5	1697 W Grand Blvd
		Medic 18	Squad 05		8	18236 Livernois
		Medic 12			6	2200 Crane
		Medic 13	Squad 06		3	10700 Shoemaker
	Ladder 22				2	6830 McGraw
		Medic 08	Haz-Mat. 1, Decon. 1 Air 1 Foam Trailer 1 Apparatus Division	Battalion Chief 1	1	3080 Russell St. @ Wilkins St.

== Organization ==
=== Division/Rank structure ===
Below is the division and rank structure of the Detroit Fire Department, including car/radio callsign designations.

Administration Division (100 callsigns)

- Executive Fire Commissioner (EFC) (100)
- First Deputy Commissioner (FDC) (101)
- Second Deputy Commissioner (SDC) (102, 103, 104)

Firefighting Division (200 callsigns)

- Chief of Department (200)
- Deputy Chief (DC) (201, 202)
- Senior Battalion Chief (SBC) (203)
- Battalion Chief (BC)
- Captain (Capt.)
- Senior Lieutenant (Lt.)
- Lieutenant (Lt.)
- Sergeant (Sgt.)
- Fire Engine Operator (FEO.)
- Firefighter Driver (FFD.)
- Senior Firefighter (SFF.)
- Firefighter (FF.)
- Firefighter-Paramedic
- Firefighter-EMT
- Trial Firefighter (TFF.)

Fireboat

- Fire Boat Operator
- Fire Boat Deckhand
- Fire Boat Mechanic

Medical Division (300 callsigns)

- Medical director (300)

Communications Division (400 callsigns)

- Chief of Communications (400)
- Assistant Chief of Communications (401)
- Captain (402)
- Lieutenant (403-406)
- Sergeant (407-410)
- Fire Dispatcher (410-432)
- Probationary Fire Dispatcher

Apparatus Division (500 callsigns)

- Senior Supervisor (500)
- Repairman (501-505)

Emergency Medical Services Division (1100 callsigns)

- Chief of EMS (Superintendent, 1100)
- Assistant Chief of EMS (Assistant Superintendent, 1101)
- Administrative Captain (1102) / Field Captain (1103) / Captain of EMS Training (1120)
- Field Lieutenant (1104-1107) / Administrative Lieutenant (1112-1113) / Lieutenant of EMS Training (1121)
- Emergency Medical Technician-Paramedic (EMT-P)
- Probationary Paramedic
- Emergency Medical Technician (EMT)
- Probationary Technician

Training Division (900 callsigns)

- Chief of Training (900)

== Communications ==
=== Response guidelines ===
Alarm Type	Alarm Level	Companies/Units Assigned
Still Alarm	1st Alarm Assignment	1 Engine Company, or 1 Engine Company and 1 Ladder Company
Box Alarm	1st Alarm Assignment	3 Engine Companies, 1 Ladder Company, 1 Squad Company, 1 Chief Unit, 1 Ambulance
Commercial Box Alarm	1st Alarm Assignment	4 Engine Companies, 2 Ladder Companies, 2 Squad Companies, 2 Chief Units, 1 Ambulance, 1 EMS Supervisor
2nd Alarm Fire	2nd Alarm Assignment	3 Engine Companies, 2 Ladder Companies (with 1 Platform Truck Company), 1 Squad Company, 1 Chief Unit, Car 203 (Senior Chief), 1 Ambulance, 1 Medic Supervisor
3rd Alarm Fire	3rd Alarm Assignment	3 Engine Companies, 1 Ladder Company, 1 Squad Company, 1 Chief Unit, 1 Deputy Chief Unit (Car 201 or Car 202), 1 Ambulance, 1 EMS Supervisor, Mobile Command Unit
Motor Vehicle Accident/Elevator Rescue	Special Assignment	1 Engine Company, 1 Squad Company, 1 Chief Unit, 1 Medic Unit
Confined-Space Rescue	Special Assignment	1 Engine Company, 1 Squad Company, 1 Chief Unit, 1 Medic Unit
Bomb Threat	Special Assignment	4 Engine Companies, 1 Ladder Company, 1 Squad Company, 1 Chief Unit, Haz-Mat. Unit, 1 Medic Unit
Police Assist/Access	Special Assignment	1 Ladder Company or 1 Squad Company, 1 Chief Unit

Additional EMS units are added at the discretion of Medical Incident Command on scene.

== Notable members ==
- Terry Duerod, a former NBA player and Detroit-area native, served on the force for 27 years after his basketball career, retiring in 2016.

== See also ==
- Government of Detroit
- Detroit Public Safety Headquarters
