= Fireboats in Halifax, Nova Scotia =

History of fireboats in Halifax

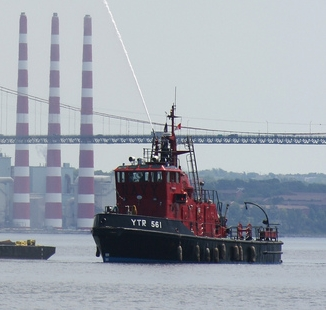
The Canadian Armed Forces operated the CFAV Firebird, which served in Halifax for decades.

Although it is a busy port, there is sparse record of fireboats in Halifax, Nova Scotia.

During World War II, at least two fireboats served, temporarily, in Halifax: The Rouille (later HMCS Rouille), formerly of Toronto served in Halifax; and the James Battle, formerly of Detroit.

In 1946, after the Rouille and James Battle were returned to their original owners, the Navy commissioned the FT-1 Fox (YTM-556), a tugboat built to a wartime design, modified to serve as a firetug. It served from 1946 to 1974.

The Canadian Armed Forces operated the CFAV Firebird in Halifax, from 1974 to 2014, and three large tugs, also equipped with water-cannons.

In 2008, the city was close to completing the purchase of Halifax fireboat 08-448B, a small 28 feet (8.5 m) fireboat, but it sank while undergoing its acceptance trials.

In July 2019, the city requested tenders for a new fireboat, in the $1 million cost range, of up to 40 feet (12 m) length.
