= CCGS Earl Grey =

Ship built in 1986

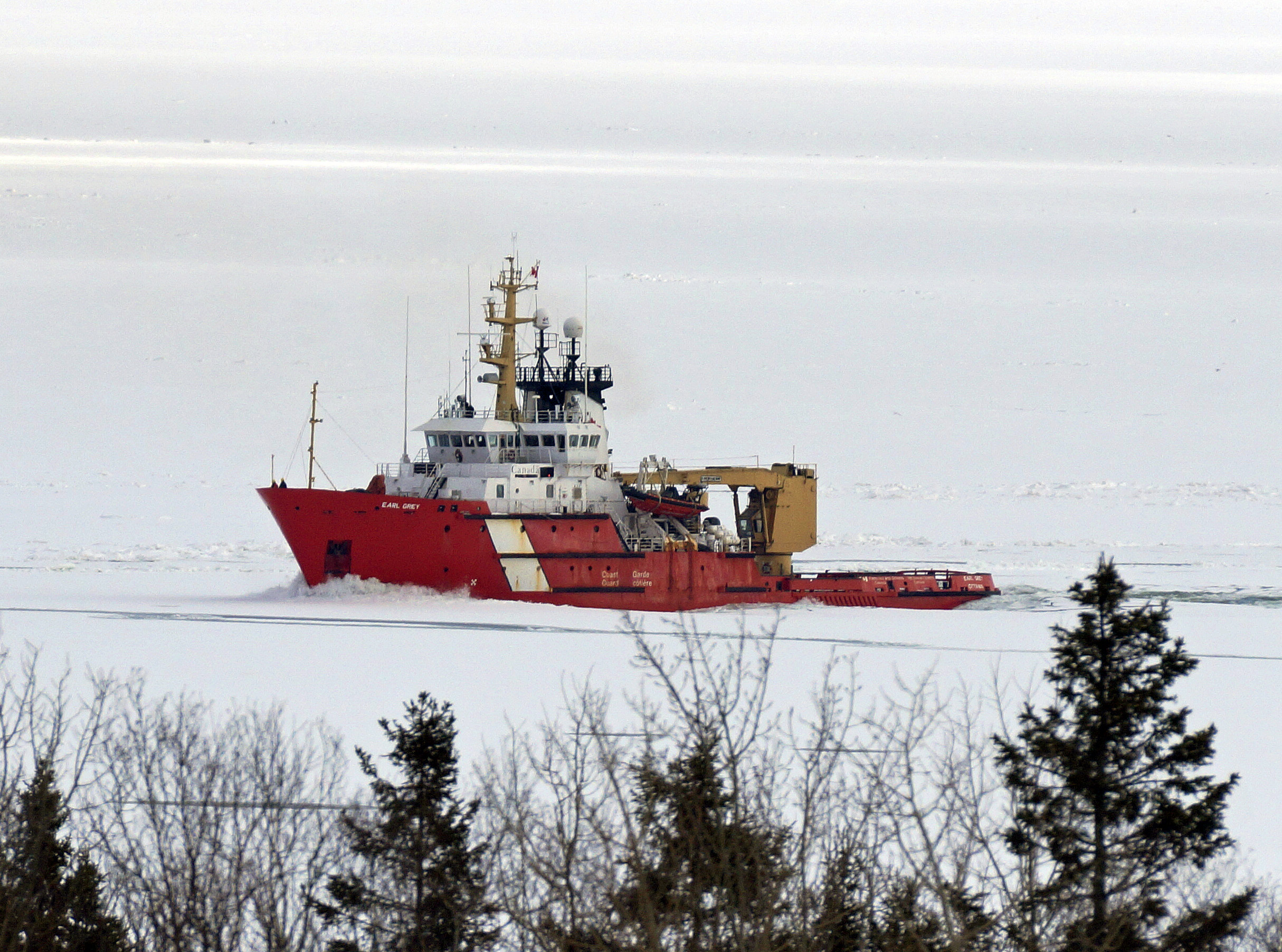
- Earl Grey in 2015

History

Canada
- Name: Earl Grey
- Namesake: Albert Grey, 4th Earl Grey, Governor General of Canada
- Owner: Government of Canada
- Operator: Canadian Coast Guard
- Port of registry: Ottawa, Ontario
- Ordered: 1983
- Builder: Pictou Shipyards Limited, Pictou, Nova Scotia
- Yard number: 218
- Commissioned: 30 May 1986
- In service: 1986–present
- Home port: CCG Base at Charlottetown (Maritime Region)
- Identification: CG3029; IMO number: 8412340
- Status: In active service

General characteristics
- Class & type: Samuel Risley-class light icebreaker/buoy tender
- Tonnage: 1,988 GT; 642 NT
- Displacement: 2,935 long tons (2,982 t)
- Length: 69.73 m (228 ft 9 in)
- Beam: 13.7 m (44 ft 11 in)
- Draught: 5.2 m (17 ft 1 in)
- Ice class: CASPPR Arctic Class 2
- Propulsion: 4 × Deutz SBV 9M628 9-cylinder geared diesel engines; 2 × controllable pitch propellers
- Speed: 15 knots (28 km/h; 17 mph) maximum
- Range: 18,000 nmi (33,000 km) at 11 kn (20 km/h; 13 mph)
- Endurance: 58 days
- Complement: 24

CCGS Earl Grey (Note: CCGS stands for Canadian Coast Guard Ship) is a Samuel Risley-class light icebreaker and buoy tender in the Canadian Coast Guard. Constructed in 1986, the vessel serves a variety of roles, including light ice-breaking and buoy tending, as well as being strengthened for navigation in ice to perform tasking along the shores off the Atlantic coast of Canada. Like her sister ship, CCGS Samuel Risley, she carries a large and powerful crane on her long low afterdeck for manipulating buoys. Earl Grey is the second icebreaker in Canadian service to carry the name.

== Design and description ==
The design of the vessel is based on offshore supply-tugboat designs, with strengthened chines. The vessel has a tall foredeck, and a long low quarterdeck, for carrying buoys, where a crane with a capability of lifting 15 long tons (15 t) is permanently mounted. The crane is motion stabilized. Earl Grey is 69.7 metres (228 ft 8 in) long overall with a beam of 13.7 metres (44 ft 11 in). The icebreaker has a draught of 5.2 metres (17 ft 1 in). Earl Grey displaces 2,935 long tons (2,982 t) and has a 1,988 gross tonnage (GT) and a 642 net tonnage (NT).

The ship is powered by four Deutz 4SA 9-cylinder diesel-electric engines driving two controllable pitch propellers that create 8,836 horsepower (6,589 kW). This gives the vessel a maximum speed of 15 knots (28 km/h). The vessel has a capacity of 634 m^{3} (139,000 imp gal) of diesel fuel that gives Earl Grey a range of 18,000 nautical miles (33,000 km) at 11 knots (20 km/h) and the vessel can stay at sea for up to 58 days. The ship is equipped with one Caterpillar 3306 emergency generator.

The vessel is equipped with two Racal Decca navigational radars using the I band. Earl Grey is a light icebreaker and has an ice class of Arctic Class 2, which certifies that the ship has the capability to break ice up to 2 feet (0.61 m) thick. The vessel has a complement of 24, with 9 officers and 15 crew.

In 2023, the vessel received an upgraded wastewater treatment system to filter suspended solids and heavy metals.

== Career ==
Ordered in 1983, the ship was constructed by Pictou Shipyard Ltd at their yard in Pictou, Nova Scotia with the yard number 218. The vessel was completed on 30 May 1986. The vessel is registered in Ottawa, Ontario and home ported at Charlottetown, Prince Edward Island.

The ship took part in fall 1998 in assisting in the recovery of wreckage from the crash of Swissair Flight 111. Earl Grey and CCGS Mary Hichens recovered wreckage from the plane, while transferring human remains to HMCS Preserver. On 7–8 December 1989, two cargo vessels, Capitaine Torres and Johanna B, sank in the Cabot Strait. Earl Grey was among the units dispatched to search for survivors, but they failed to find any. In 1996, the ship assisted in the recovery and raising of the wrecked oil barge Irving Whale which had been carrying bunker oil that had been salvaged from another sunken ship from the sea floor.

On 21 March 2001, CCGS Earl Grey, CCGC Sambro, CFAV Firebird, HMCS Moncton, HMCS Goose Bay, CCGS Sir William Alexander and the commercial oceangoing salvage tugboat Ryan Leet all tried to render assistance to the container ship Kitano which had caught fire off Chebucto Head. In the 2009 budget for the Department of Fisheries and Oceans, the Canadian Coast Guard, requested funds to refit Earl Grey and some of the CCG's other large vessels. The contract to refit Earl Grey was awarded to Davie Shipbuilding, announced on 12 March 2015. In January 2017 Earl Grey was sent to monitor the tanker Arca 1 which ran aground off the coast of Nova Scotia.

== Predecessor ==
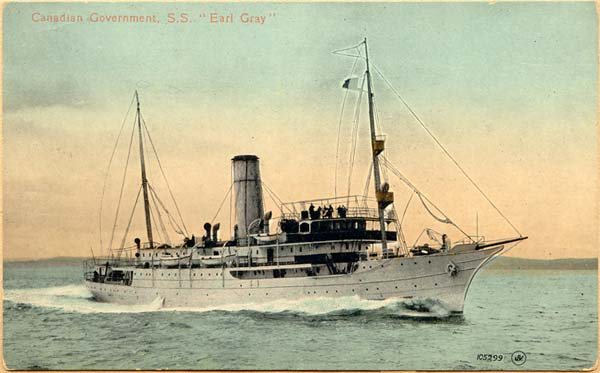
The first Earl Grey, sold to Russia in 1914.

In 1909 the Government of Canada ordered an icebreaking passenger steamship for service in the Northumberland Strait to connect the ports of Charlottetown and Georgetown on Prince Edward Island with the mainland port of Pictou. She was commissioned in 1910 by then Governor General, Albert Grey as CGS Earl Grey (Canadian Government Ship Earl Grey). She was sold in 1914 to Imperial Russia, an ally during World War I. The ship, christened Kanada and later Fyodor Litke, operated in the Arctic until 1958.
