= Kitano (disambiguation) =

Kitano may refer to:

- Kitano, a Japanese container ship that caught fire on March 22, 2001
- Kitano Tenman-gū, a shrine in Kyoto
- Kitano-chō, a historical district in Kobe

== People with the surname ==
- Hiroaki Kitano (北野 宏明; born 1961), a Japanese scientist
- Kie Kitano (北乃 きい; born 1991), a Japanese actress
- Masaji Kitano (北野 政次; 1894–1986), the Japanese second commander of Unit 731
- Sōta Kitano (北野 颯太; born 2004), a Japanese footballer
- Takayo Kitano (北野 高代; born 1971), a Japanese swimmer
- Takeshi Kitano (北野 武; born 1947), a Japanese film director and comedian
- Yushu Kitano (北野 祐秀; 1930–2016), a Japanese sports wrestler

== Fictional characters ==
- Kitano, a Battle Royale character
  - Yukiko Kitano, a Battle Royale character
- Taro Kitano, a major character in Hot Wheels: World Race and AcceleRacers

== See also ==
- Kitano Station (disambiguation)
