= CCGS Sambro =

Canadian Coast Guard motor lifeboat

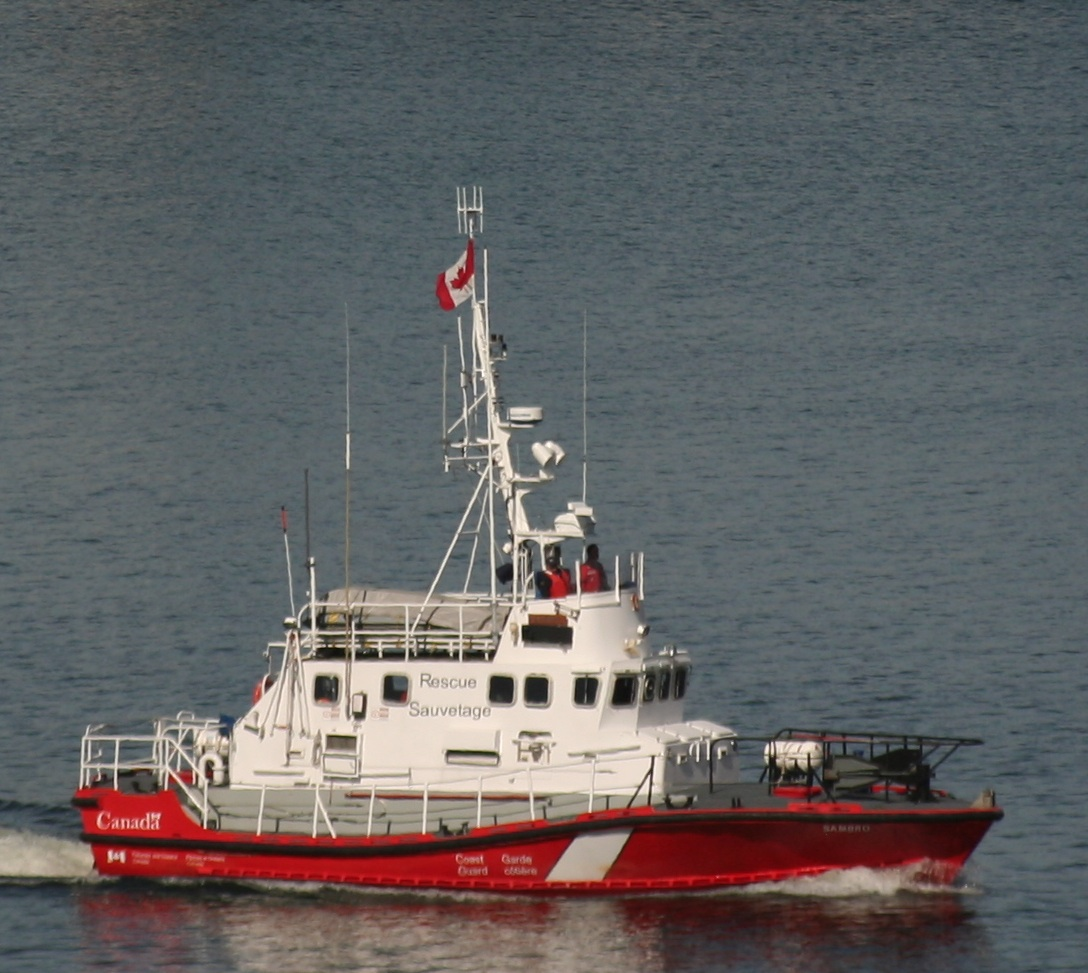
- CCGS Sambro

History

Canada
- Name: Sambro
- Operator: Canadian Coast Guard
- Port of registry: Ottawa, Ontario
- Builder: Hike Metals & Shipbuilbing Limited, Wheatley, Ontario
- Commissioned: 1996
- Home port: CCG Base Sambro, Nova Scotia - Maritime Region
- Identification: MMSI number: 316001601; Callsign: CG2613
- Status: in active service

General characteristics
- Class & type: Canadian Coast Guard Arun-class lifeboat
- Displacement: 36 tonnes
- Length: 52 ft (16 m)
- Draft: 5 ft (1.5 m)
- Propulsion: 2 × Caterpillar 3408 TA diesel engines, 485 hp (362 kW)
- Speed: 18 knots (33 km/h)
- Range: 250 nmi (460 km)
- Endurance: 1 day
- Complement: 4

CCGS Sambro is a Canadian Coast Guard motor lifeboat homeported in Sambro, Nova Scotia.

She is a Canadian Coast Guard Arun-class lifeboat, based on the United Kingdom 52-foot (16 m) Arun-class lifeboat design. and forms the nucleus of Canadian Coast Guard Station Sambro (CCG Station Sambro) which maintains a crew of four personnel on duty 24 hours per day (two shifts) who are expected to be underway within 30 minutes of being tasked on a search and rescue (SAR) mission by Joint Rescue Coordination Centre Halifax.

== MV Kitano rescue ==
On March 21, 2001, CCGS Sambro, CCGS Earl Grey, CFAV Firebird, HMCS Moncton, HMCS Goose Bay, CCGS Sir William Alexander and the commercial oceangoing salvage tug Ryan Leet tried to render assistance to the container ship Kitano which had caught fire off Chebucto Head, Nova Scotia. Kitano's cargo had caught fire when the vessel was in Force 8 to 10 winds. None of the vessels were able to render assistance.

== Swissair Flight 111 response ==
CCGS Sambro was the first SAR asset to respond to reports of a commercial airliner crash at the mouth of St. Margaret's Bay on the evening of September 2, 1998. There were no survivors among the 229 people on board Swissair Flight 111 and CCGS Sambro returned to normal SAR standby after other CCG and Canadian Forces assets took over search and recovery operations.

== Rescued the crew of Fireboat 08-448B ==
On September 17, 2008, Fireboat 08-448B capsized in Halifax harbour, while undergoing her acceptance trials and crew familiarization. Sambro rescued all eight occupants, without serious injury.

== See also ==
- CCGS Westport - one of two lifeboat operating out of Westport, Nova Scotia.
- CCGS Clarks Harbour - same class of boat operating out of Port Hardy, British Columbia.
