= YTR =

YTR may refer to:

- CFB Trenton, a Canadian military base
- YTR-, the hull classification for Fire-class fireboats in the Royal Canadian Navy
- Leucine, represented in genetic codon code; see DNA and RNA codon tables
- You the Rock, Japanese hip-hop musician also known as YTR
- YTR-, prefix for Yamaha trumpet models; see List of Yamaha Corporation products
