= CFAV Firebrand =

Royal Canadian Navy Fireboat

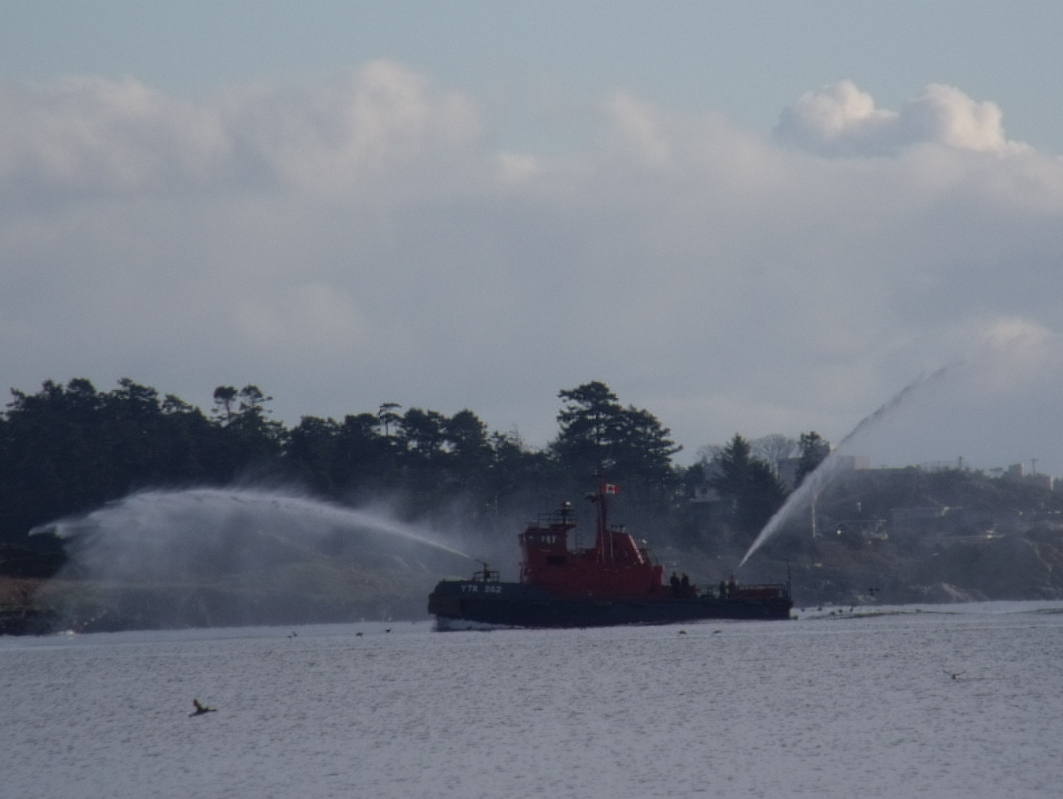
- Firebrand in Esquimalt Harbour

History

Canada
- Name: Firebrand
- Operator: Royal Canadian Navy
- Builder: Vancouver Shipyards, North Vancouver
- Commissioned: 1978
- Home port: CFB Esquimalt
- Status: in active service

General characteristics
- Class & type: Fire-class fireboat
- Displacement: 140 tonnes (138 long tons)
- Length: 23.1 m (75 ft 9 in)
- Beam: 6.4 m (21 ft)
- Draught: 2.6 m (8 ft 6 in)
- Propulsion: 2 × 365 hp (272 kW) azimuthing Z-drives; 1 × hydraulic tunnel bow thruster
- Speed: 11 knots (13 mph; 20 km/h)
- Complement: 5
- Equipment: 3 × manually-controlled 3-inch (7.6 cm) water cannon 2 × diesel-driven fire pumps, 2,500 gpm at 150 psi each

CFAV Firebrand (YTR 562) is a Fire-class fireboat in the Royal Canadian Navy designed by Robert Allan Ltd. Firebrand is based in CFB Esquimalt, on Vancouver Island. Her sister ship CFAV Firebird (YTR 561) was based in CFB Halifax and decommissioned in 2014.

Firebrand has three water cannons can fire water, supplemented by fire suppressant foam from her two 250 gallon tanks. Her water cannons are capable of pumping a 19,000 litres per minute at 150 psi. Although not operated as such, she can also serve as a tugboat, and has a bollard pull of 7.5 tons.

== Design and construction ==
According to the Canadian American Strategic Review the class was designed by naval architects Robert Allan Limited, and were built at Vancouver Shipyards in North Vancouver in 1978, and later acquired by the Canadian Forces.

The two ships displaced 140 tonnes (138 long tons) and were 23.1 metres (75 ft 9 in) long, with a beam of 6.4 metres (21 ft) and a draught of 2.6 metres (8 ft 6 in). The ships were powered by two 365 horsepower (272 kW) Z-drives and one hydraulic tunnel bow thruster. This gave the vessels a maximum speed of 11 knots (20 km/h; 13 mph). The ships had a crew of five firefighters.

The Fire class was equipped with three manually-controlled 3-inch (76 mm) water cannons, two diesel-driven fire pumps capable of expending 2,500 gpm at 150 psi each.

== Service history ==
On 4 December 2012 the Department of National Defence published an enquiry for Canadian shipbuilders interested in building replacements for the Glen-class tugs¸ and Fire-class fireboats. A single class would replace both the tugs and the fireboats, and would be operated by civilian crews. The replacement vessels would have water cannons that could be controlled remotely, by a single individual.
