= Bullerjahn =

Bullerjahn is a surname. Notable people with the surname include:

- George S. Bullerjahn, American microbiologist
- Jens Bullerjahn (1962–2022), German engineer and politician
