= James Battle =

James or Jim Battle may refer to:

- Jim Battle (baseball) (1901–1965), American baseball player
- Jim Battle (American football) (1938–2026), American football player
- Jim Battle (politician), British politician
- James Battle (fireboat)
