= Fire-class fireboat =

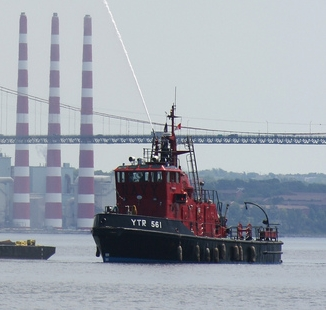
- CFAV Firebird in Halifax harbour

Class overview
- Name: Fire class
- Builders: Vancouver Shipyards
- Operators: Royal Canadian Navy
- In service: 1978-present
- Completed: 2
- Active: 1
- Laid up: 1

General characteristics
- Type: Fireboats / Yard tractor tugs
- Displacement: 140 tonnes (138 long tons)
- Length: 23.1 m (75 ft 9 in)
- Beam: 6.4 m (21 ft)
- Draught: 2.6 m (8 ft 6 in)
- Propulsion: 2 × 365 hp (272 kW) azimuthing Z-drives; 1 × hydraulic tunnel bow thruster
- Speed: 11 knots (20 km/h; 13 mph)
- Complement: 5
- Equipment: 3 × manually-controlled 3-inch (7.6 cm) water cannons 2 × diesel-driven fire pumps, 2,500 gallons per minute at 150 psi (1,000 kPa) each

The Fire-class fireboats/yard tractor tugs were two fireboats operated by the Royal Canadian Navy. The two vessels are CFAV Firebrand (YTR 562) and CFAV Firebird (YTR 561).

== Design and construction ==
Firebird was based at CFB Halifax, and Firebrand at CFB Esquimalt. According to the Canadian American Strategic Review the class was designed by naval architects Robert Allan Limited, and were built at Vancouver Shipyards in North Vancouver in 1978, and later acquired by the Canadian Forces.

The two ships displaced 140 tonnes (140 long tons) and were 23.1 metres (75 ft 9 in) long, with a beam of 6.4 metres (21 ft) and a draught of 2.6 metres (8 ft 6 in). The ships were powered by two 365 horsepower (272 kW) azimuthing Z-drives and one hydraulic tunnel bow thruster. This gave the vessels a maximum speed of 11 knots (20 km/h; 13 mph). The ships had a crew of five firefighters.

The Fire class was equipped with three manually-controlled 3-inch (76 mm) water cannons, two diesel-driven fire pumps capable of expending 2,500 gpm at 150 pounds per square inch (1,000 kPa) each.

== Ships in class ==
Number	Name	Builder	Laid down	In service	Status
YTR 561	Firebird	Vancouver Shipyards, North Vancouver	1978	1978-2014	Awaiting disposal
YTR 562	Firebrand	Vancouver Shipyards, North Vancouver	1978		In active service

== Service history ==
In 2008, Firebird helped extinguish a fire aboard the former Canadian Coast Guard vessel CCGS Tupper in Halifax harbour.

On 4 December 2012 the Department of National Defence published a Letter of Interest (LOI)/Request for Information (RFI) for Canadian shipbuilders interested in building replacements for the Glen-class tugs¸ and Fire-class fireboats.

A single class would replace both the tugs and the fireboats, and would be operated by civilian crews. The replacement vessels would have water cannons that could be controlled remotely, by a single individual. The replacement vessels would have bollard pull of 40 tons—almost six times as much as the 7.5 tons the Fire-class vessels are capable of.

On 29 January 2014, the availability of Firebird to fight fires was reduced due to budget cuts, being on standby only during weekdays during normal working hours. On 4 December 2014, Firebird was taken out of service in Halifax, and placed on the disposal list as a result of budget cuts. The ship will be replaced using tugboats from around the harbour.

== Replacement ==
On 29 April 2019 the Government of Canada announced Ocean Industries of Isle-aux-Coudres, Quebec was awarded the contract to build four tow-tug/rescue vessels to replace both the Fire-class fireboat/tractor tugs and Glen-class yard tugs with delivery expected from 2021 to 2023. The new tugs will be staffed by civilian crews and be restricted to the naval base/yard only.
