= Robert M. L. McKay =

Robert Michael Lee McKay is a Canadian microbiologist and presently the executive director and a professor of the Great Lakes Institute for Environmental Research, School of Environment, at the University of Windsor. McKay's research interest center around the physiological ecology of phytoplankton communities in large lakes and oceans. His efforts focus on environmental microbiology including harmful cyanobacterial blooms and blooms of ice-associated algae in the Great Lakes.

== Education ==
McKay completed his B.Sc. at Queen's University in Kingston, ON, Canada in 1986. Subsequently, he completed a Ph.D. at McGill University (Montreal, QC) in 1991. McKay was awarded a postdoctoral fellowship from the Natural Sciences and Engineering Research Council of Canada, which supported training on marine toxins at the Institute of Marine Science (University of Alaska). This was followed by subsequent training at Brookhaven National Laboratory in their Oceanographic and Atmospheric Sciences Division. In 1997, McKay accepted a faculty position at Bowling Green State University where he rose to the rank of full professor. During this period he held the Ryan Professorship in their Department of Biological Sciences. In 2019, he left BGSU to join the leadership of the University of Windsor.

== Research ==
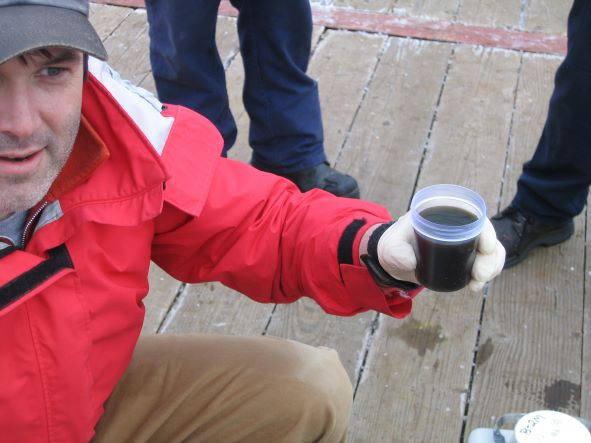
McKay collecting a plankton net sample in February 2007

McKay's research is focused on large lakes with some forays into ocean sciences. He has worked in locations including the Southern Ocean, the Baltic Sea, Lake Balaton (Hungary) and the Laurentian Great Lakes. He studies the microbial ecology of these systems, including harmful cyanobacterial blooms and blooms of ice-associated algae in the Great Lakes, often teaming with his BGSU colleagues George Bullerjahn and Hans Paerl. During the COVID-19 pandemic, his lab group made a transition to wastewater surveillance in support of public health. He is the author of over 100 peer-reviewed manuscripts and serves as an investigator on grants from the Natural Sciences and Engineering Research Council, Canada Foundation for Innovation, Canadian Institutes of Health Research, U.S. National Science Foundation, and the National Institute of Environmental Health Sciences.

== Awards and recognition ==
McKay was named a Humboldt Scholar in 2005 by the GEOMAR Helmholtz Centre for Ocean Research Kiel. In 2019, his collaborations with a number of researchers earned the John H Martin Award from the Association for the Sciences of Limnology and Oceanography. In 2026 he was name a Laureate of the Daylight Academy, winning the Daylight Award for Research. He shared this award with collaborators Brittany N. Zepernick and Steven W Wilhelm for their research into how climate change influences the way that winter phytoplankton use light.

== Personal life ==
McKay is the head coach of the Lancers curling team at the University of Windsor.
