= Samuel Risley-class icebreaker =

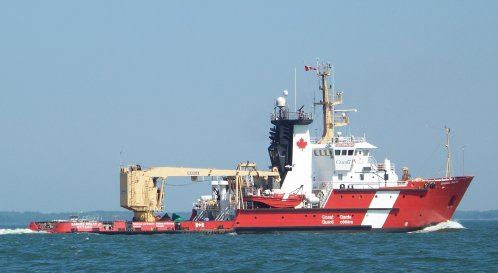
- Samuel Risley in 2008

Class overview
- Name: Samuel Risley class
- Builders: Vito Steel Boat & Barge Limited, Delta, British Columbia; Pictou Shipyards Limited, Pictou, Nova Scotia
- Operators: Canadian Coast Guard
- Built: 1985–1986
- In service: 1985–present
- Completed: 2
- Active: 2

General characteristics
- Type: Icebreaker and buoy tender
- Tonnage: 1,967 GT /649.5 NT (Samuel Risley); 1,988 GT / 642 NT (Earl Grey)
- Displacement: 2,935 long tons (2,982 t) full load
- Length: 69.7 m (228 ft 8 in)
- Beam: 13.7 m (44 ft 11 in)
- Draught: 5.2 m (17 ft 1 in)
- Ice class: Arctic Class 2
- Installed power: 4 × Wärtsilä Vasa 16V22 12-cylinder diesel-electric engines 6,595 kW (8,844 hp) (Samuel Risley); 4 × Deutz SBV 9M628 9-cylinder diesel-electric engines 8,836 hp (6,589 kW) (Earl Grey)
- Propulsion: 2 × controllable pitch propellers
- Speed: 13–15 knots (24–28 km/h)
- Endurance: 58 days
- Complement: 24

The Samuel Risley-class icebreakers are a class of two icebreakers and buoy tenders constructed for and operated by the Canadian Coast Guard. The two ships are based on offshore supply tugboat design and entered service in the 1980s. Samuel Risley is deployed to the Central Region, operating mainly on the Great Lakes of North America, while Earl Grey is posted to Atlantic Canada, working off the east coast of Canada.

== Design and description ==
In the late 1970s, offshore supply tugboats were in high demand and their success led to experimentation by the Canadian Coast Guard. In 1980, a crane was temporarily installed aboard the former offshore supply vessel CCGS Jackman, situated on the afterdeck. This was done to see if this would be a successful model for buoytending. Jackman visited all the principal coast guard stations in the eastern half of the country to test the setup in different conditions in 1980–81. The results of the test proved positive and in 1983, the Canadian Coast Guard contracted Robert Allen Ltd of Vancouver to create a design based on this setup.

The design of the vessels is based on offshore supply-tugboat designs, with strengthened chines. The vessel has a tall foredeck, and a long low quarterdeck, for carrying buoys, where a crane with a capability of lifting 15 long tons (15 t) is permanently mounted. The crane is motion stabilized. Both vessels are 69.7 metres (228 ft 8 in) long overall with a beam of 13.7 metres (44 ft 11 in). The icebreakers have a draught of 5.2 metres (17 ft 1 in). Both ships displace 2,935 long tons (2,982 t) with Earl Grey having a 1,988 gross tonnage (GT) and a 642 net tonnage (NT) and Samuel Risley having a gross tonnage of 1,967 and a net tonnage of 649.5.

Earl Grey is powered by four Deutz 4SA 9-cylinder diesel-electric engines driving two controllable pitch propellers that create 8,836 horsepower (6,589 kW). This gives the vessel a maximum speed of 15 knots (28 km/h). The vessel has a capacity of 634 m^{3} (22,400 cu ft) of diesel fuel that gives Earl Grey a range of 18,000 nautical miles (33,000 km) at 11 knots (20 km/h) and the vessel can stay at sea for up to 58 days. The ship is equipped with one Caterpillar 3306 emergency generator. Samuel Risley is powered by four Wärtsilä Vasa 16V22 12-cylinder geared diesel-electric engines driving two controllable pitch propellers that create 6,595 kW (8,844 hp). This gives the vessel a maximum speed of 13 knots (24 km/h). The vessel has a capacity of 692 m^{3} (152,000 imp gal) of diesel fuel that gives Samuel Risley a range of 16,700 nautical miles (30,900 km) at 12 knots (22 km/h). The ship is equipped with one General Motors 6–71 emergency generator.

The vessels are equipped with two Racal Decca navigational radars using the I band. Both ships are considered light icebreakers and have an ice class of Arctic Class 2, which certifies that the ships have the capability to break ice up to 2 feet (0.61 m) thick. The vessels each have a complement of 24, with 9 officers and 15 crew.

== Ships in class ==
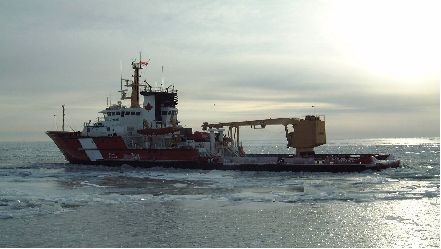
Samuel Risley in winter

Samuel Risley class construction data
Name	Builder	In service	Status
Samuel Risley	Vito Steel Boat & Barge Limited, Delta, British Columbia	4 April 1985	Active in service
Earl Grey	Pictou Shipyards Limited, Pictou, Nova Scotia	30 May 1986	Active in service

== Operational history ==
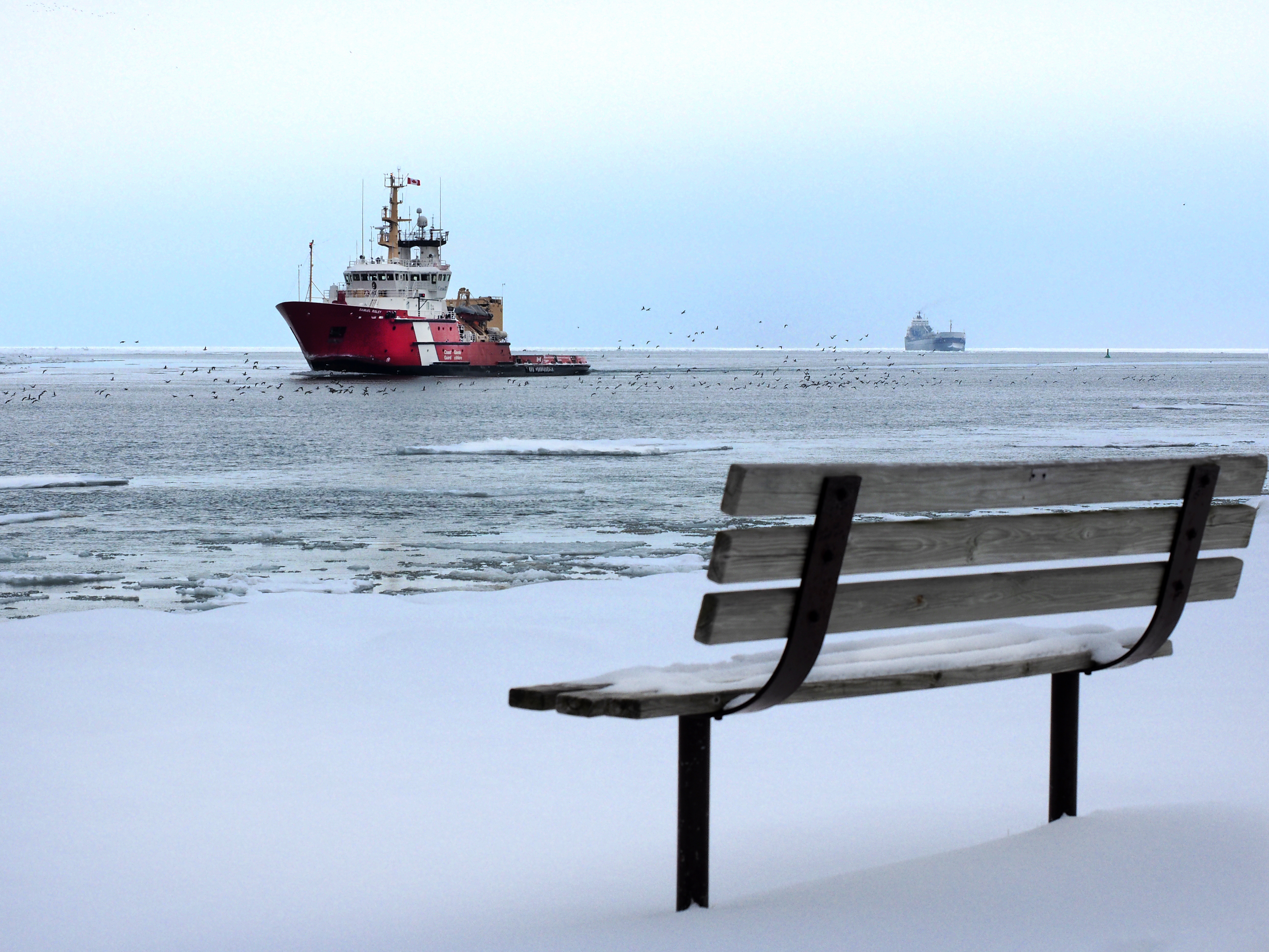
Samuel Risley in February 2015

Earl Grey was constructed by Pictou Shipyard Ltd at their yard in Pictou, Nova Scotia with the yard number 218. The vessel was completed on 30 May 1986. The vessel is registered in Ottawa, Ontario and home ported at Charlottetown, Prince Edward Island. Samuel Risley was built by Vito Steel Boat & Barge Limited at their yard in Delta, British Columbia with the yard number 161 and launched in 1984. The vessel was completed on 4 April 1985. After completion, Samuel Risley sailed to eastern Canada, transiting the Panama Canal and deploying to the Great Lakes. The ship is assigned to the Central Region, based at Parry Sound, Ontario.

Earl Grey took part in fall 1998 in assisting in the recovery of wreckage from the crash of Swissair Flight 111. Earl Grey and CCGS Mary Hichens recovered wreckage from the plane, while transferring human remains to HMCS Preserver. On 7–8 December 1989, Earl Grey was sent to look for survivors from two cargo vessels that had sunk in Cabot Strait. None were found. In 1996, the ship assisted in the recovery and raising of a wrecked oil barge from the sea floor which had been carrying bunker oil that had been salvaged from another sunken ship.

In early 2015, Samuel Risley worked alongside other icebreakers to rescue many commercial ships that had become stuck in the ice on the Great Lakes. Earl Grey underwent a refit beginning in 2015. Samuel Risley underwent a refit in 2016. Samuel Risley deployed to the Arctic Ocean during the 2018 sailing season, taking part in the resupply mission to the United States Air Force base at Thule, Greenland.
