= George S. Bullerjahn =

American microbiologist

- Education: Dartmouth College; University of Virginia
- Scientific career
- Fields: Microbiology, ecology
- Workplaces: Bowling Green State University

George S. Bullerjahn is an American microbiologist, a former Distinguished Research Professor at Bowling Green State University in Ohio. He is the founding director of the Great Lakes Center for Fresh Waters and Human Health. His specialty is microbial ecology; his research has focused on the health of the Laurentian Great Lakes, particularly the harmful algal bloom-forming populations in Lake Erie since the early 2000s.

== Education and training ==
Bullerjahn grew up in Boston and attended Browne and Nichols School. He received an A.B. in Biology from Dartmouth College in 1977 and a PhD in biology from the University of Virginia in 1984. He was a postdoctoral associate at the University of Missouri (1984–1988) with Professor Louis Sherman. Subsequently, he accepted a faculty position at Bowling Green State University in Ohio and spent his entire career there. He is a professor emeritus in BGSU's Biology Department.

== Research ==
Bullerjahn's early work focused on the genetics of Rhizobium spp. He published his first studies on thylakoid structure of the model cyanobacteria Aphanocapsa in 1985, and then many papers on the physiology and molecular biology of numerous cyanobacteria including Synechococcus and Prochlorothrix. In 2004, he co-authored what was to be the first of many papers on limnology and the ecology of cyanobacteria in fresh waters. His other research efforts include a focus on the development of cyanobacteria-based biosensors (bioreporters) used in the estimation of the bioavailability of nutrients in environmental samples.

Bullerjahn's research interests are currently focused on detection, enumeration and characterization of cyanobacteria in aquatic systems. With a specific focus on potentially toxic cyanobacteria including Microcystis and Planktothrix, his research and that of the center he directs (which includes scientists spread across 6 states as well as in Canada) is focused on the mitigation and prevention of harmful algal blooms in fresh waters with a particular focus on Lake Erie. These efforts include published studies of physical limnology, nutrient dynamics and the effects of viruses on these communities. From publishing with Professor Reinhard Laubenbacher, Bullerjahn's Erdős number is 4.

Bullerjahn has been a member of Great Lakes limnological expeditions including surveys aboard CCGS LIMNOS, the US EPA RV LAKE GUARDIAN and completed a 1,600 km transect from western Lake Superior to Lake Erie aboard RV BLUE HERON. His field work has extended to winter studies of ice-covered lakes including multiple surveys of Lake Erie aboard the light icebreaker CCGS GRIFFON, where a team of Canadian and US scientists, including Robert M. L. McKay, identified prolific growth of diatom algae associated with ice cover. He has joined expeditions studying Hungary's Lake Balaton, Russia's Lake Onega and reservoirs in the UNESCO Třeboň Basin Biosphere of the Czech Republic

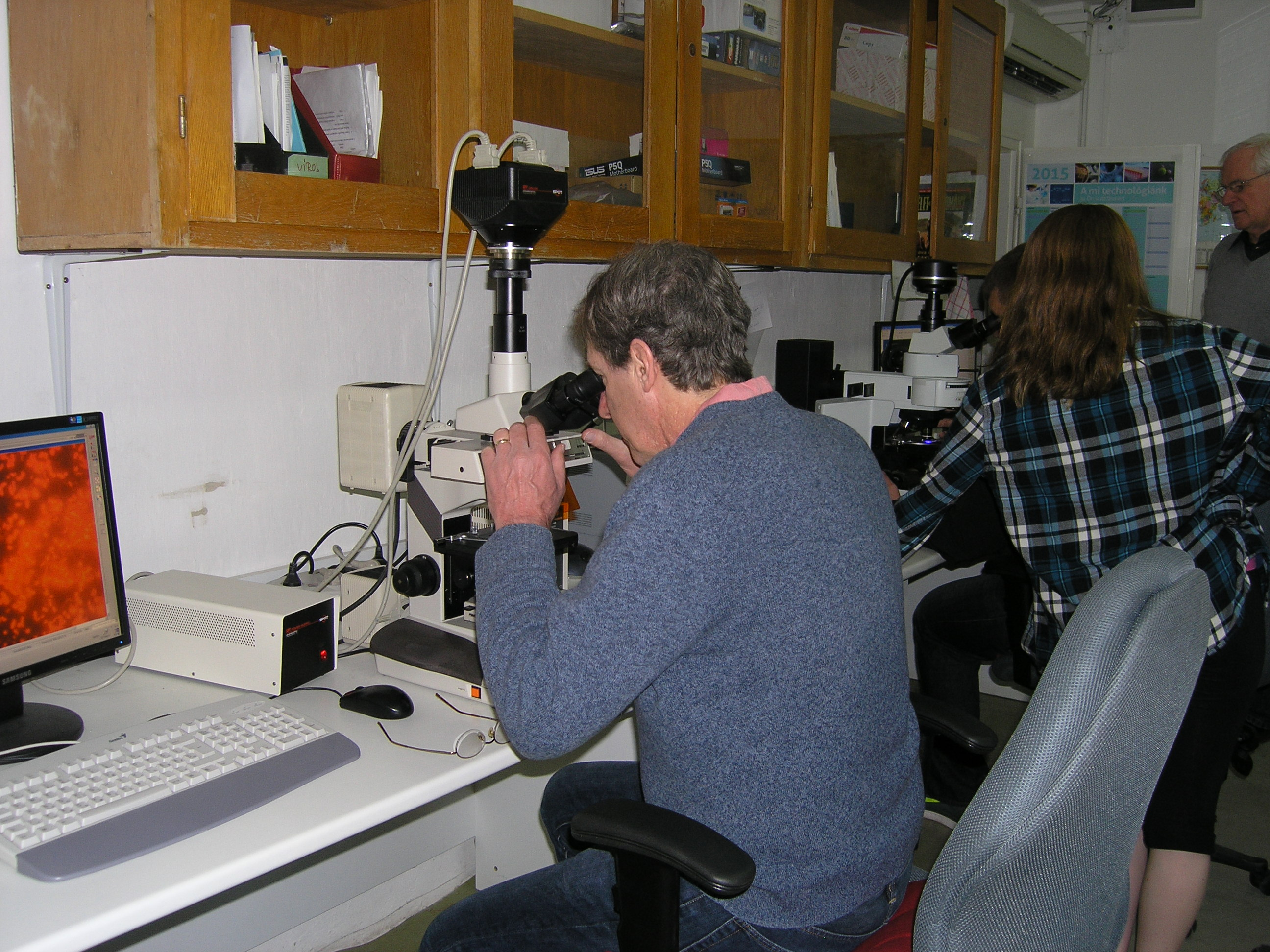
Bullerjahn examining algal samples

== Personal life ==
Bullerjahn's wife Anne was a faculty member in Biology at Owens Community College. During high school and while at Dartmouth, Bullerjahn was a varsity rower and a member of the Dartmouth College Lightweight crew. During his career, he has also become involved in social and political actions associated with the health of the Laurentian Great Lakes, serving as an expert for multiple regional news outlets, organizing symposia and working with colleagues to assist Rep. Bob Latta (R-OH) in drafting the Drinking Water Protection Act that was signed into law by President Barack Obama in 2016. Bullerjahn is a supporter of the Everton F.C.
