= CCGS Clarks Harbour =

Rescue lifeboat

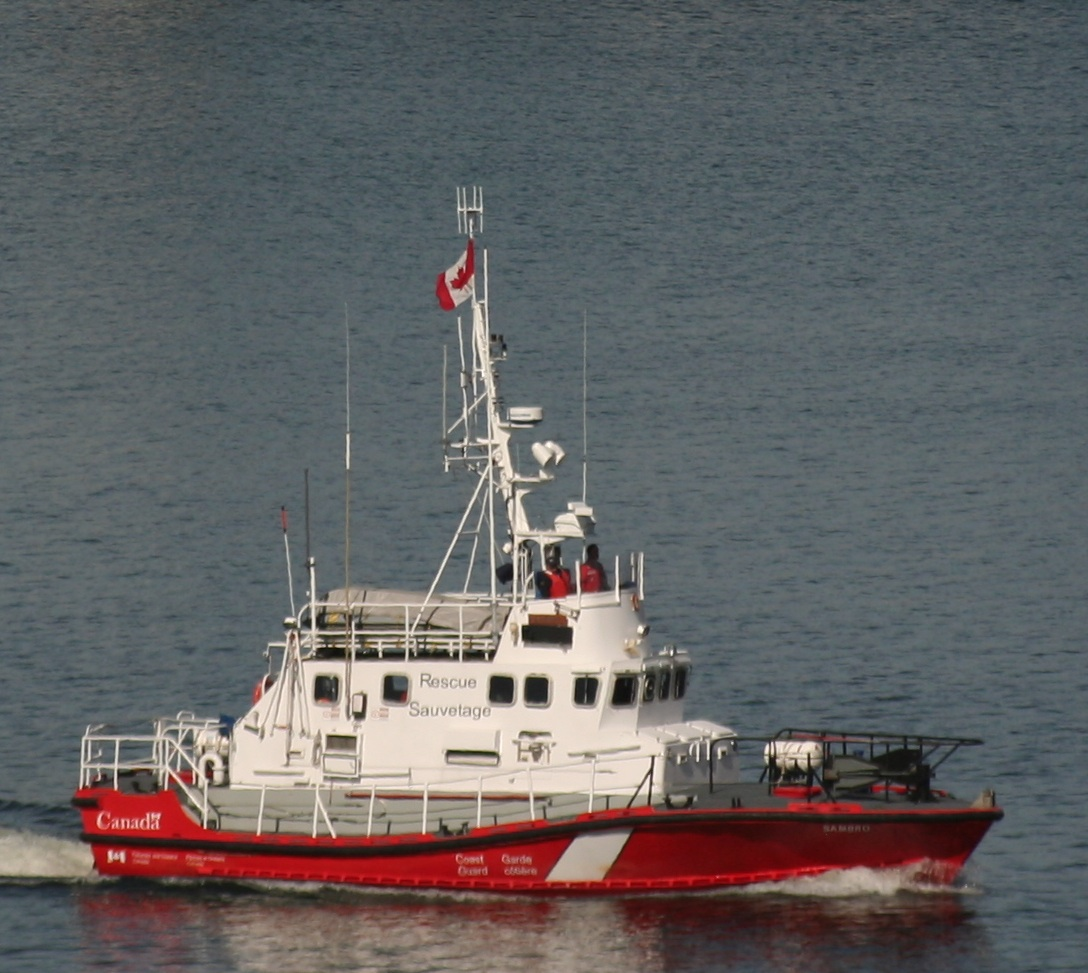
- Sister ship of Clarks Harbour, CCGS Sambro in Nova Scotia.

History

Canada
- Name: Clarks Harbour
- Namesake: Clark's Harbour, Nova Scotia
- Operator: Canadian Coast Guard
- Port of registry: Ottawa, Ontario
- Builder: Hike Metals Products & Shipbuilding Limited, Wheatley, Ontario
- Yard number: 819269
- Launched: 1996
- Identification: MMSI number: 316001616; Callsign: CG2612
- Status: in active service

General characteristics
- Class & type: Arun-class lifeboat
- Displacement: 42 tonnes (46.30 short tons)
- Length: 15.77 m (51 ft 9 in)
- Beam: 5.18 m (17 ft 0 in)
- Draft: 1.25 m (4 ft 1 in)
- Speed: 20 knots (37 km/h; 23 mph)
- Range: 200 nmi (370 km; 230 mi)
- Endurance: 1 day
- Complement: 4

The Canadian Coast Guard has had two motor lifeboats named CCGS Clarks Harbour. The first was a 13-metre (43 ft) vessel, which entered service in 1996.

The second is a Canadian Coast Guard Arun-class lifeboat, based on the United Kingdom 15.77-metre (51.7 ft) Arun-class motor lifeboat design. She is staffed by a crew of four.

== See also ==
Clarks Harbour is one of ten Arun-class lifeboats operated by the Canadian Coast Guard:

- CCGS Sambro - one of two lifeboat operating out of Sambro, Nova Scotia.
- CCGS Westport - same class of boat operating out of Westport, Nova Scotia.
