= CCGS Westport =

Canadian Coast Guard search and rescue vessel

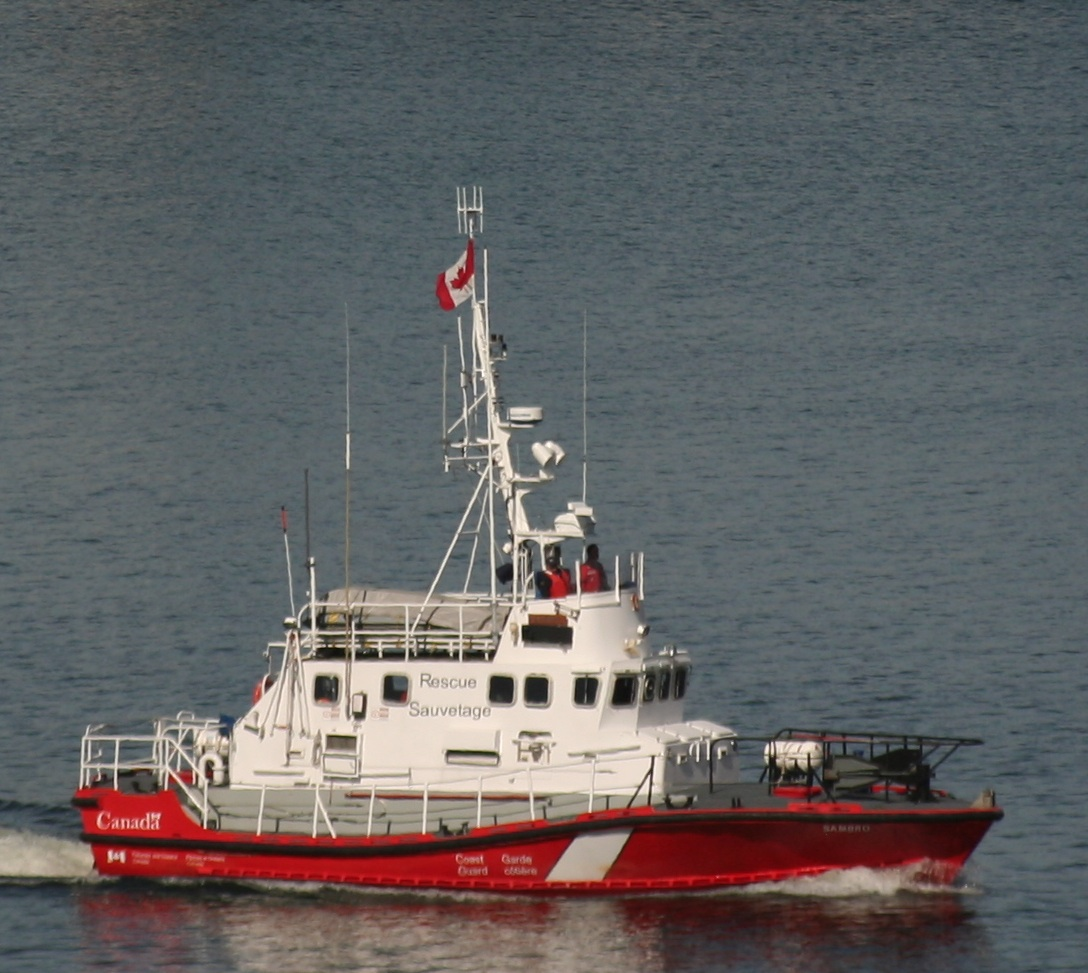
- Vessel similar to CCGS Westport

History

Canada
- Name: Westport
- Operator: Canadian Coast Guard
- Port of registry: Ottawa, Ontario
- Builder: Hike Metals & Shipbuilding Limited, Wheatley, Ontario
- Yard number: 820275
- Commissioned: 1997
- Home port: CCG Base Westport, Nova Scotia - Maritime Region
- Identification: MMSI number: 316001892; Callsign: CG2388
- Status: in active service

General characteristics
- Class & type: Canadian Coast Guard Arun-class motor lifeboat
- Tonnage: 43 GT
- Length: 15.77 m (51.7 ft)
- Beam: 5.18 m (17.0 ft)
- Draft: 1.25 m (4.1 ft)
- Propulsion: 2 × Caterpillar 3408 TA diesel engines, 704 hp (525 kW)
- Speed: 20 knots (37 km/h; 23 mph)
- Range: 100 nmi (190 km; 120 mi)
- Endurance: 1 day
- Complement: 4

CCGS Westport is a Canadian Coast Guard search and rescue vessel homeported in Westport, Nova Scotia.

She is a Canadian Coast Guard Arun-class motor lifeboat, based on the United Kingdom 15.77-metre (51.7 ft) Arun-class design. She entered service in 1997.

Westport is staffed by a crew of four and allows rescued persons to survive one day before help arrives.

== See also ==
Westport is one of ten Arun-class lifeboats operated by the Canadian Coast Guard:

- CCGS Sambro - one of two lifeboat operating out of Sambro, Nova Scotia.
- CCGS Clarks Harbour - same class of boat operating out of Clark's Harbour, Nova Scotia.
