= Hans W. Paerl =

American professor

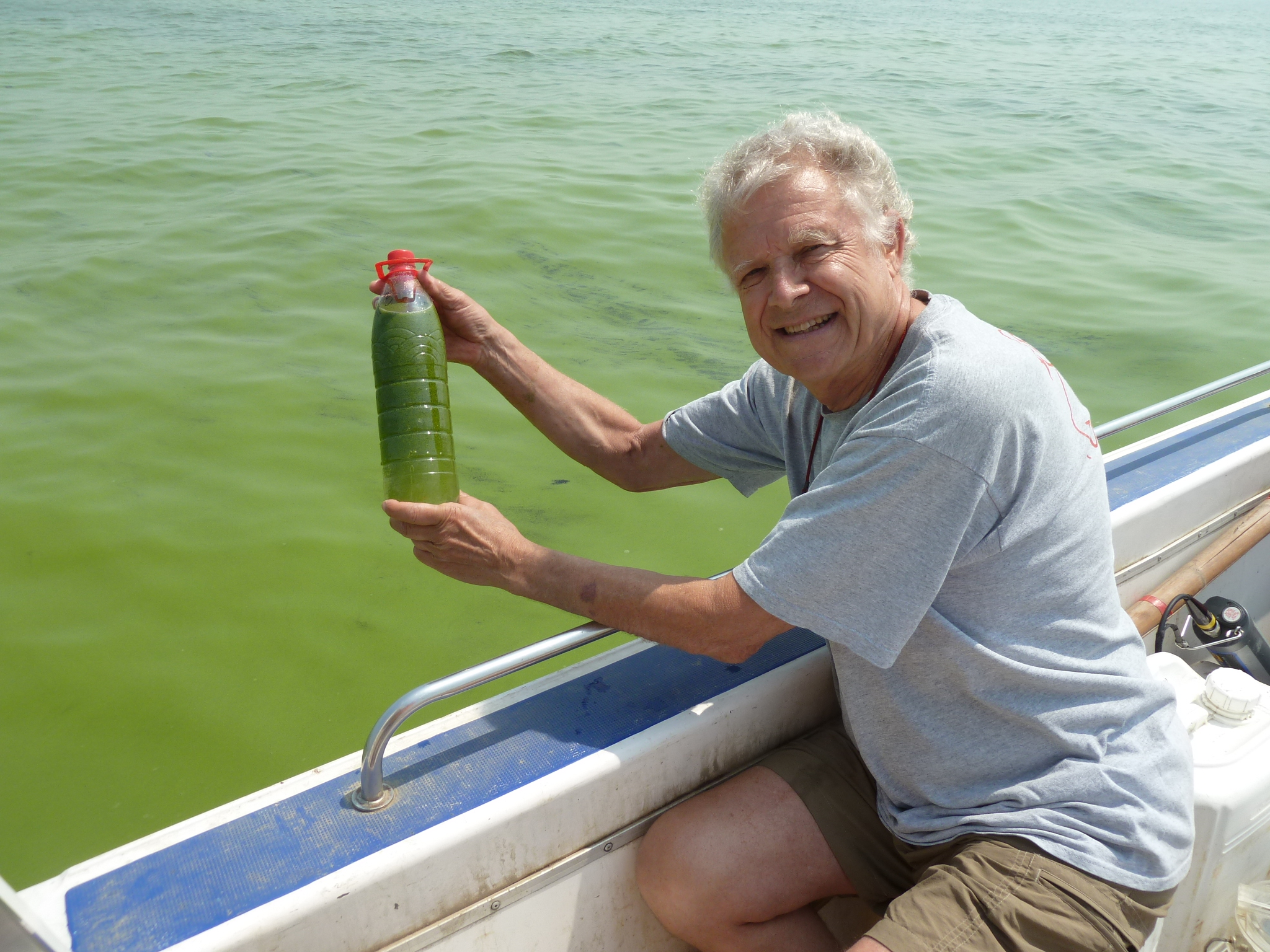
- Born: Amsterdam, the Netherlands
- Citizenship: United States of America
- Education: University of California, Davis
- Scientific career
- Fields: Limnology, Microbiology
- Workplaces: UNC-Chapel Hill Institute of Marine Sciences
- Website: https://paerllab.web.unc.edu/

Hans W. Paerl is a Dutch American limnologist and a Kenan Professor of Marine and Environmental Sciences at the University of North Carolina – Chapel Hill (UNC-CH) Institute of Marine Sciences. His research primarily assesses microbially-mediated nutrient cycling, primary production dynamics, and the consequences of human impacts on water quality and sustainability in waters around the world.

== Education and training ==
Paerl attended Aragon High School in California and received an AA in biological sciences from the College of San Mateo in 1967. He received a BS in biological sciences (1969) and Ph.D. in ecology in 1973 from the University of California, Davis. He has been on the faculty of the University of North Carolina at Chapel Hill since 1978, where he currently is the Kenan Professor of Marine and Environmental Sciences at the UNC-CH's Institute of Marine Sciences.

== Research ==
Paerl's collaborative research addresses microbially-mediated nutrient cycling and primary production dynamics, including environmental controls and management of harmful algal blooms and their toxins. His work aims to assess the effects of human and climatic alterations of water quality and sustainability of estuarine and coastal marine waters in the US and globally. Paerl has published over 350 peer-reviewed articles and book chapters on these subjects and his work has been supported by the National Science Foundation, EPA, NIH, NOAA, The North Carolina Water Resources Research Institute, and the Chinese Academy of Sciences. As part of his research, Paerl also began several estuarine water quality monitoring and assessment programs in coastal North Carolina, including the Neuse River Estuary Modeling and Monitoring Program (ModMon) and the Ferry-based Water Quality Monitoring Program for the Pamlico Sound System (FerryMon). In recent years Paerl has completed a large number of projects with collaborators in China. He is also well known in the scientific community for having written foundational synthesis and review pieces on harmful algal blooms. Since 2018 Paerl has been one of the lead investigators in the Great Lakes Center for Fresh Waters and Human Health. The center was under the direction of Professor George Bullerjahn, an American microbiologist and collaborator with Paerl on several studies until 2024. It is presently led by Professors Greg Dick (U Michigan) and David Kennedy (U Toledo).

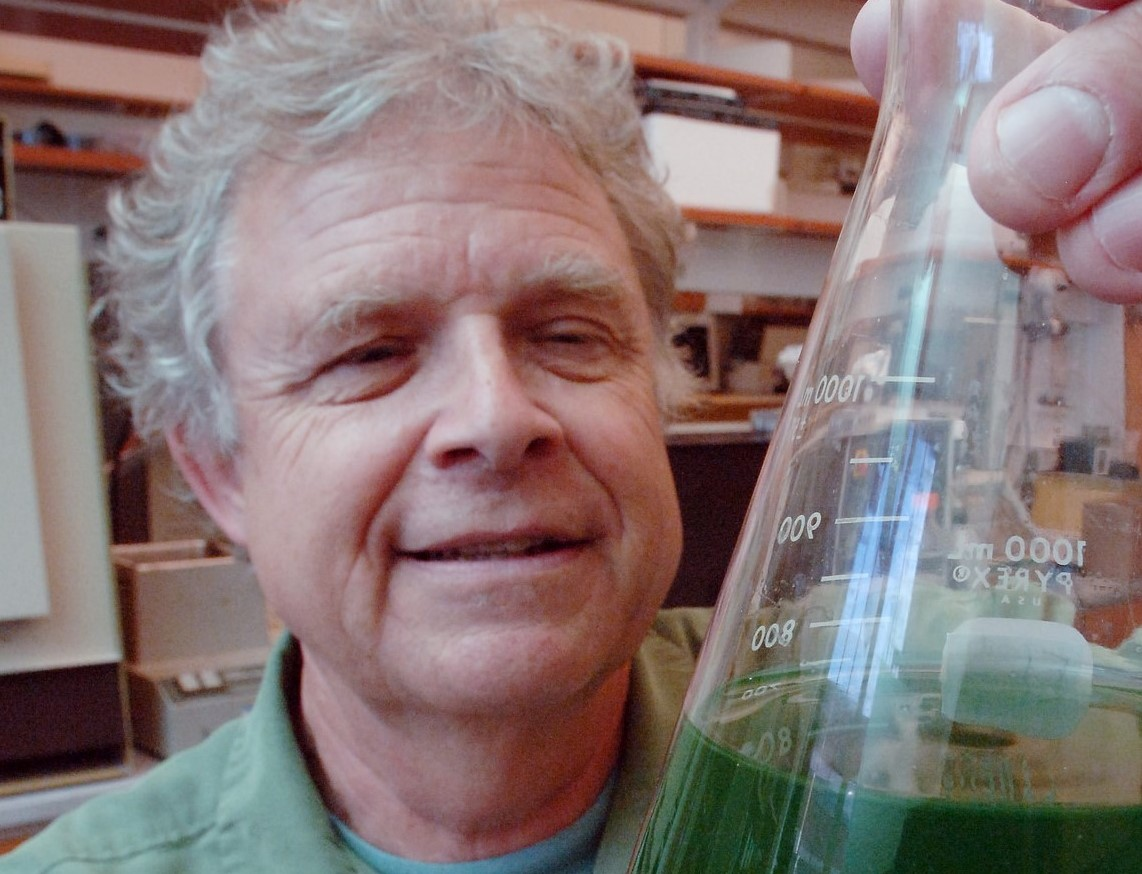

Throughout his career, Paerl has supervised over 75 graduate students, 12 postdoctoral researchers, and countless undergraduate students at UNC-CH as well as other institutions.

== Awards and commendations ==
Paerl received the 2003 G. Evelyn Hutchinson Award from the Association of the Sciences of Limnology and Oceanography (ASLO)., and the 2011 Odum Award from the Coastal and Estuarine Research Federation (CERF) for addressing the causes, consequences and controls of eutrophication in aquatic ecosystems. In 2015, he was named a Fellow of the American Geophysical Union (AGU), and in 2017 he was named a fellow of the Royal Dutch Academy of Sciences. Paerl also holds honorary joint faculty positions at Hohai University and the Nanjing Institute of Geography and Limnology, Chinese Academy of Sciences, both located in Nanjing, China

== Personal life ==
Paerl was born in the Netherlands and immigrated with his family to the US in 1957. Eventually, Pearl moved to Beaufort, NC where he met his wife, Barbara Hill (1981).
