= CCGS Samuel Risley =

Canadian Coast Guard icebreaker and buoy tender

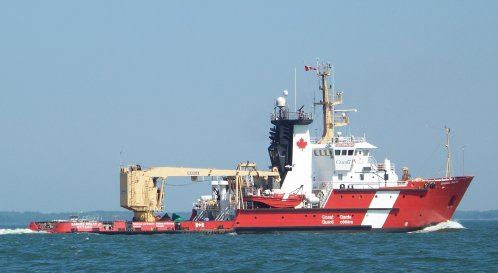
- Samuel Risley in 2008

History

Canada
- Name: Samuel Risley
- Namesake: Samuel Risley, maritime inspector
- Operator: Canadian Coast Guard
- Port of registry: Ottawa, Ontario
- Builder: Vito Steel Boat & Barge Limited, Delta, British Columbia
- Yard number: 161
- Commissioned: 4 April 1985
- In service: 1985–present
- Home port: CCG Base Parry Sound (Central Region)
- Identification: CG2960; IMO number: 8322442
- Status: in active service

General characteristics
- Type: Samuel Risley-class icebreaker and buoy tender
- Tonnage: 1,967 GT; 649.5 NT
- Displacement: 2,935 long tons (2,982 t) full load
- Length: 69.7 m (228 ft 8 in)
- Beam: 13.7 m (44 ft 11 in)
- Draught: 5.2 m (17 ft 1 in)
- Ice class: CASPPR Arctic Class 2
- Speed: 13 knots (24 km/h)
- Range: 16,700 nmi (30,900 km) at 12 kn (22 km/h)
- Endurance: 58 days
- Complement: 22

CCGS Samuel Risley (Note: CCGS stands for Canadian Coast Guard Ship) is a Canadian Coast Guard icebreaker and buoy tender assigned to the Great Lakes area (Central and Arctic Region). Lead ship of her class, the vessel is named after Samuel Risley, the 19th century maritime inspector and first head of Board of Steamship Inspectors for Upper Canada and Ontario. Based in the Great Lakes, CCGS Samuel Risley is responsible for keeping an ice-free passage between Port Colborne, Ontario and Thunder Bay, Ontario.

== Design and description ==
The design of the vessel is based on offshore supply-tugboat designs, with strengthened chines. The vessel has a tall foredeck, and a long low quarterdeck, for carrying buoys, where a crane with a capability of lifting 15 long tons (15 t) is permanently mounted. The crane is motion stabilized. Samuel Risley is 69.7 metres (228 ft 8 in) long overall with a beam of 13.7 metres (44 ft 11 in). The icebreaker has a draught of 5.2 metres (17 ft 1 in). Samuel Risley has a 1,967 gross tonnage (GT) and 649.5 net tonnage (NT).

The ship is powered by four Wärtsilä Vasa 12V22 12-cylinder geared Diesel Engines driving two controllable pitch propellers that create 6,595 kW (8,844 hp). This gives the vessel a maximum speed of 14 knots (26 km/h). The vessel has a capacity of 692 m^{3} (152,000 imp gal) of diesel fuel that gives Samuel Risley a range of 16,700 nautical miles (30,900 km) at 12 knots (22 km/h) and the vessel can stay at sea for up to 58 days. The ship is equipped with one Detroit Diesel 6–71 emergency generator.

The vessel is equipped with two Racal Decca navigational radars using the "X" and "S" band. Samuel Risley is a light icebreaker and has an ice class of Arctic Class 2, which certifies that the ship has the capability to break ice up to 2 feet (0.61 m) thick, but in practice can successfully maintain continuous progress in up to 0.9 meters of ice. The vessel has a complement of 22, with 9 officers and 13 crew.

== Operational history ==
Ordered in 1983, the ship was launched in 1984 by Vito Steel Boat & Barge Limited at their yard in Delta, British Columbia with the yard number 161. The vessel was completed on 4 April 1985. After completion, the ship sailed to eastern Canada, transiting the Panama Canal and deploying to the Great Lakes. The ship is assigned to the Central Region, based at Parry Sound, Ontario.

In January 2015, Samuel Risley and CCGS Griffon worked to free several ships that had become icebound on the St. Clair River. In April, Samuel Risley was one of four icebreakers sent to rescue ten commercial vessels trapped in ice near Whitefish Point, Michigan.

In June 2016 Samuel Risley underwent a major refit by Newdock – St. John's Dockyard Ltd. Work. The cost of the contract was $3.6 million CAN. The refit involved the replacement of the bow thruster, a crane overhaul and recoating of the hull, along with a renovation of the galley and inspections. On 28 December 2017, Samuel Risley, in concert with the United States Coast Guard vessel USCGC Biscayne Bay, freed the lakers Edgar B. Speer and Walter J. McCarthy Jr. that had become stuck in the ice on the St. Marys River below Sault Ste. Marie, Ontario the day before. Samuel Risley made its maiden voyage to the Arctic Ocean during the 2018 sailing season, leaving Quebec on 11 July 2018. The vessel took part in the annual resupply of the United States air station at Thule, Greenland.

In February 2023, Samuel Risley was deployed to Lake Huron to search for debris of an unknown object that was shot down over the Great Lakes by the United States Air Force. In January 2025, Samuel Risley was one of several ships deployed to help free the bulk carrier Manitoulin, which was stuck in ice near Buffalo, New York.
