= CCGS Tupper =

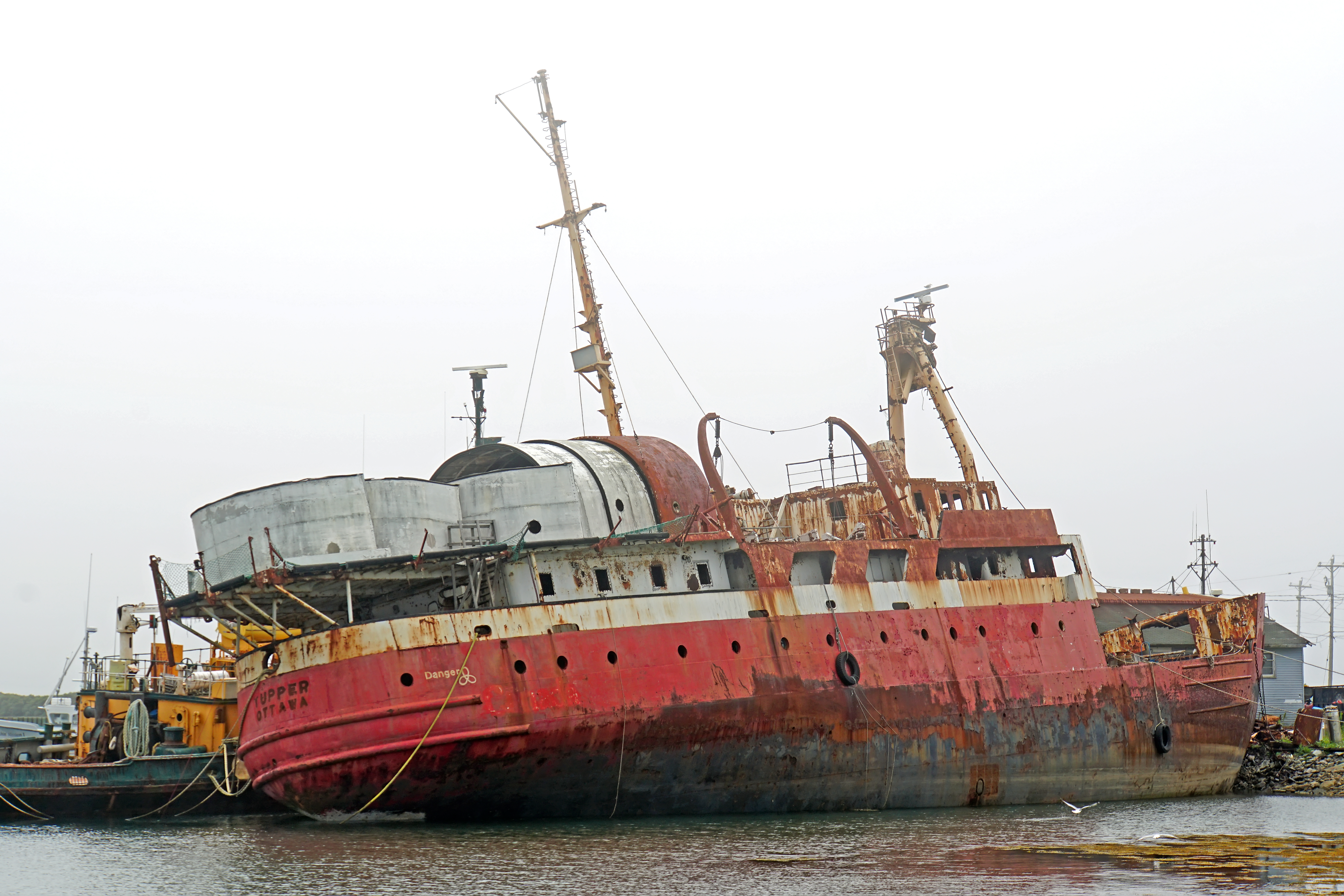
- CCGS Tupper abandoned in Marie Joseph, Nova Scotia in 2018

History

Canada
- Name: Tupper
- Namesake: Sir Charles Tupper
- Owner: Minister of Fisheries and Oceans
- Operator: Canadian Coast Guard
- Builder: Marine Industries, Sorel
- Laid down: March 1959
- Launched: 3 October 1959
- Commissioned: 1 December 1959
- Decommissioned: 1997
- Renamed: 2000 (as yacht Caruso)
- Stricken: 1998
- Home port: CCG Base Dartmouth, Nova Scotia
- Identification: IMO number: 5370905
- Fate: Sold for scrap 2011

General characteristics
- Type: Buoy tender
- Tonnage: 1,358 GRT
- Displacement: 1,876 long tons (1,906 t)
- Length: 62.4 m (204 ft 9 in)
- Beam: 12.8 m (42 ft 0 in)
- Draught: 4.2 m (13 ft 9 in)
- Installed power: 2,900 shp (2,200 kW)
- Propulsion: Diesel-electric
- Speed: 14 knots (26 km/h; 16 mph)
- Aircraft carried: 1 × helicopter
- Aviation facilities: Flight deck and hangar

CCGS Tupper (Note: CCGS stands for Canadian Coast Guard Ship) was a Canadian Coast Guard ice-strengthened buoy tender that served from 1959 to 1998. The vessel spent her entire career on the East Coast of Canada. Following her Canadian service, Tupper was sold to private interests with the intention of converting her to a yacht, but the conversion never happened and the vessel moved about Halifax Harbour, suffering a fire in 2008 before being sold for scrap in 2011. The vessel was not scrapped and the Canadian Coast Guard was forced to address the pollution concerns of the abandoned vessel in 2021.

== Design and description ==
Tupper and sister ship Simon Fraser were 62.4 m (204 ft 9 in) long overall with a beam of 12.8 m (42 ft 0 in) and a draught of 4.2 m (13 ft 9 in). The vessel had a fully loaded displacement of 1,876 long tons (1,906 t) and a gross register tonnage (GRT) of 1,358. The vessels were powered by a diesel-electric system driving two screws creating 2,900 shaft horsepower (2,200 kW). This gave the vessels a maximum speed of 14 knots (26 km/h). The ships were fitted with a flight deck and a telescopic hangar and were capable of operating one helicopter.

== Service history ==
The buoy tender's keel was laid down in March 1959 by Marine Industries at their yard in Sorel, Quebec with the yard number 257. Tupper was launched on 3 October 1959, named for a former Prime Minister of Canada. The ship entered service with the Department of Transport on 1 December 1959. In 1962 the Department of Transport's Marine Service fleet was merged into the newly formed Canadian Coast Guard and Tupper was given the new prefix CCGS.

Tupper was active in servicing the navigation aids of Atlantic Canada as well as operating in heavy ice conditions in the Gulf of St. Lawrence and St. Lawrence River, and also acted as a harbour cleanup vessel. She occasionally traveled to the north. Earlier in her career she was stationed in Charlottetown, Prince Edward Island.

=== Fate ===
The ship was taken out of service in 1997 and used as alongside training ship at CCG Dartmouth Base, renamed 1998-05 until 1999 when she was sold to an American interest and renamed MV Caruso intended for conversion to a yacht. The vessel changed owners a couple of times, never leaving Halifax Harbour, changing piers until 11 October 2008 when a large fire broke out aboard Caruso while she was moored, requiring the services of the Royal Canadian Navy's firefighting tugboat CFAV Firebird. The blaze was deemed suspicious and partially gutted the vessel. In 2011 the hulk was sold for scrap to be broken up in Marie Joseph, a small community in the Eastern Shore region of Nova Scotia. The vessel's dismantling was never completed and the hulk became a point of much controversy and concern. In January 2021, the Canadian Coast Guard's Environmental Response branch was sent to Marie Joseph to deal with the hulk and the remains of the former tugboat Craig Trans which lay beside it. They removed roughly 35,000 L (7,700 imp gal; 9,200 US gal) fuel oil/water from the hulks. In 2022 it was announced R.J. MacIsaac Construction were to remove and green recycle the remnants of the vessel. Dismantling was scheduled to start at the end of January 2023.

== Sources ==
- Maginley, Charles D. & Collin, Bernard (2001). The Ships of Canada's Marine Services. St. Catharines, Ontario: Vanwell Publishing Limited. ISBN 1-55125-070-5.
- Maginley, Charles D. (2003). The Canadian Coast Guard 1962–2002. St. Catharines, Ontario: Vanwell Publishing Limited. ISBN 1-55125-075-6.
- "Tupper (5370905)". Miramar Ship Index.
- Moore, John, ed. (1981). Jane's Fighting Ships, 1981–1982. New York: Jane's Information Group. ISBN 0-531-03977-3.
