= James Battle (fireboat) =

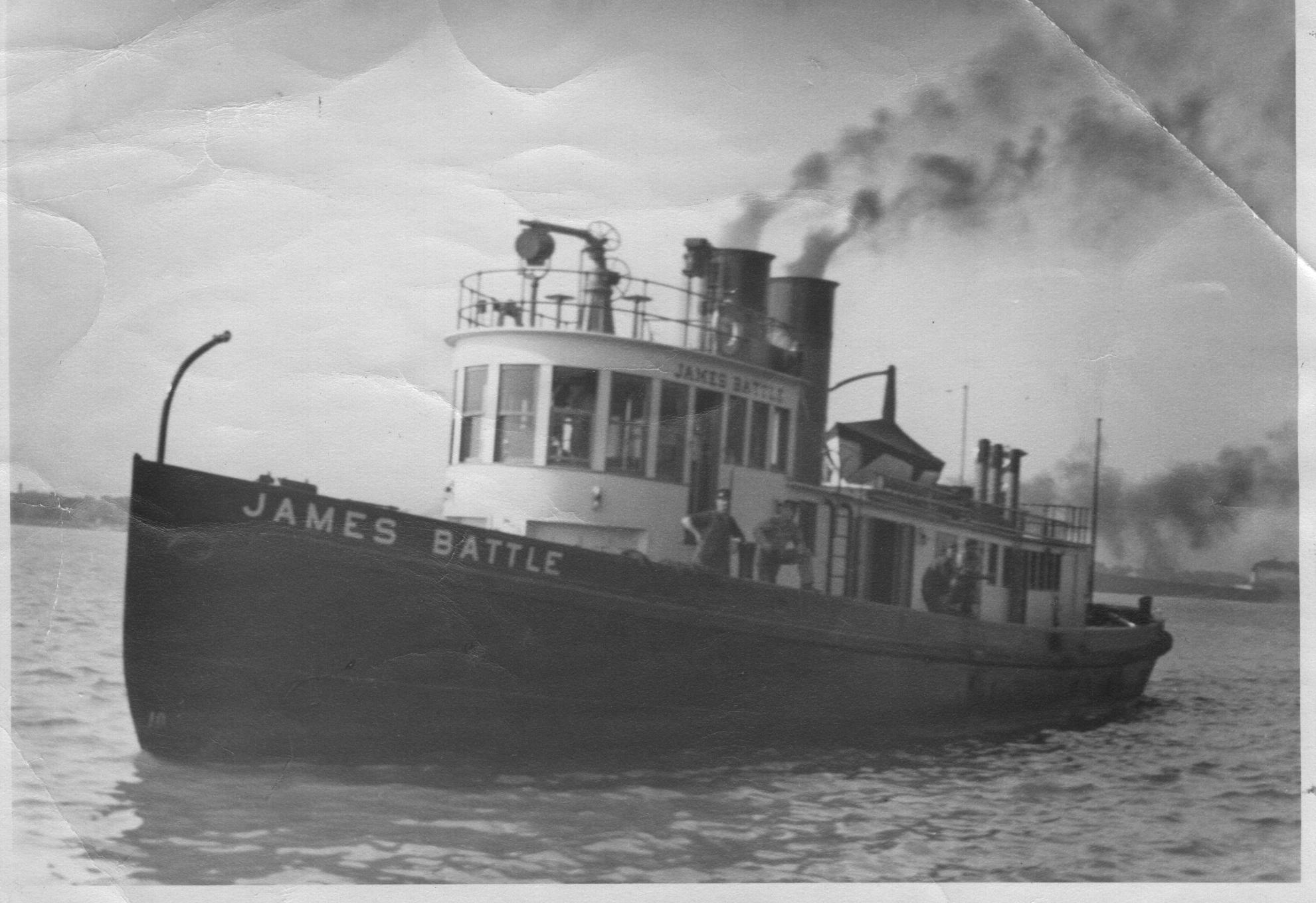
Fireboat James Battle, in Detroit.

James Battle was a fireboat, which operated in Detroit, Michigan, Halifax, Nova Scotia, and Montreal, Quebec.

She was built in Wyandotte, Michigan, in 1900, and served as a fireboat in nearby Detroit until 1941. She was propelled by steam power during her entire service in Detroit.

During World War II Halifax, Nova Scotia, was the main port where ships assembled before being dispatched in Atlantic convoys, during the Battle of the Atlantic. James Battle served as a fireboat, in Halifax, during the later years of World War II. Halifax experienced a large munition explosion, and James Battle and HMCS Rouille played important roles fighting the resulting fires. Her steam boilers were damaged beyond repair by the explosion, triggering a major refit where she had diesel engines installed.

In 1959 James Battle began to provide firefighting service in Montreal, under contract. She provided this service until 1991.
