= Kitano Station =

Kitano Station is the name of two train stations in Japan:

- Kitano Station (Fukuoka)
- Kitano Station (Tokyo)
