= Lake Guardian =

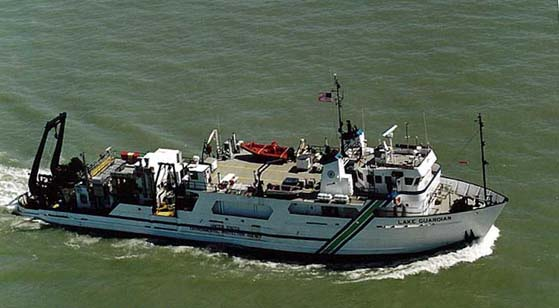
- The Lake Guardian on Lake Erie.

History
- Name: Lake Guardian
- Owner: United States Environmental Protection Agency
- Port of registry: Milwaukee, Wisconsin
- Launched: 1981
- Identification: IMO number: 8030609; MMSI number: 338021074; Call sign: WA09082
- Status: in active service
- Notes: Lake Guardian ship website

General characteristics
- Type: Dredger/Research vessel
- Tonnage: 959 GT
- Displacement: 850 tons
- Length: 180 ft (55 m)
- Beam: 40 ft (12 m)
- Draft: 11 ft (3.4 m)
- Depth: 14 ft (4.3 m)
- Ice class: C
- Installed power: 2 x 1,200 hp Caterpillar diesels; 1 x 300 hp Cummins bow thruster
- Propulsion: 2 x 4-blade stainless steel propellers, in Kort nozzles
- Speed: 11 kn (20 km/h; 13 mph)
- Range: 6,000 miles (9,700 km)
- Boats & landing craft carried: Rescue boat: Ambar 550 RIB with 2 Mercury 60HP 4-stroke outboard motors
- Crew: 14 crew (and 27 scientists)

The Lake Guardian is a research vessel that serves on the Great Lakes. She is owned by the EPA Great Lakes National Program Office (GLNPO), assisting in monitoring and reporting on the status and trends of the Great Lakes ecosystem. She has three onboard laboratories: a general purpose or "wet" laboratory, chemistry, and biology.

== Images ==
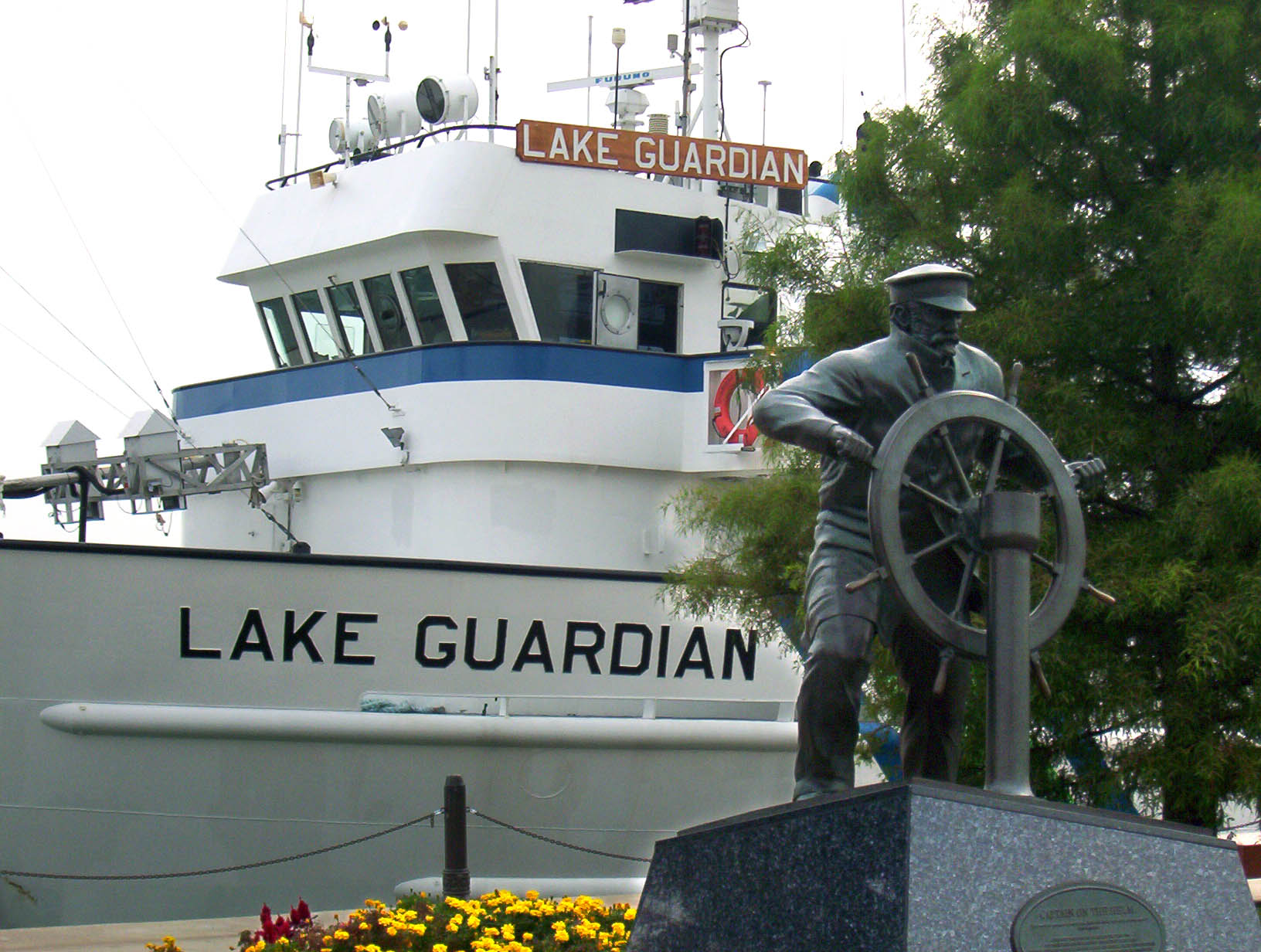
Lake Guardian moored at Chicago's Navy Pier

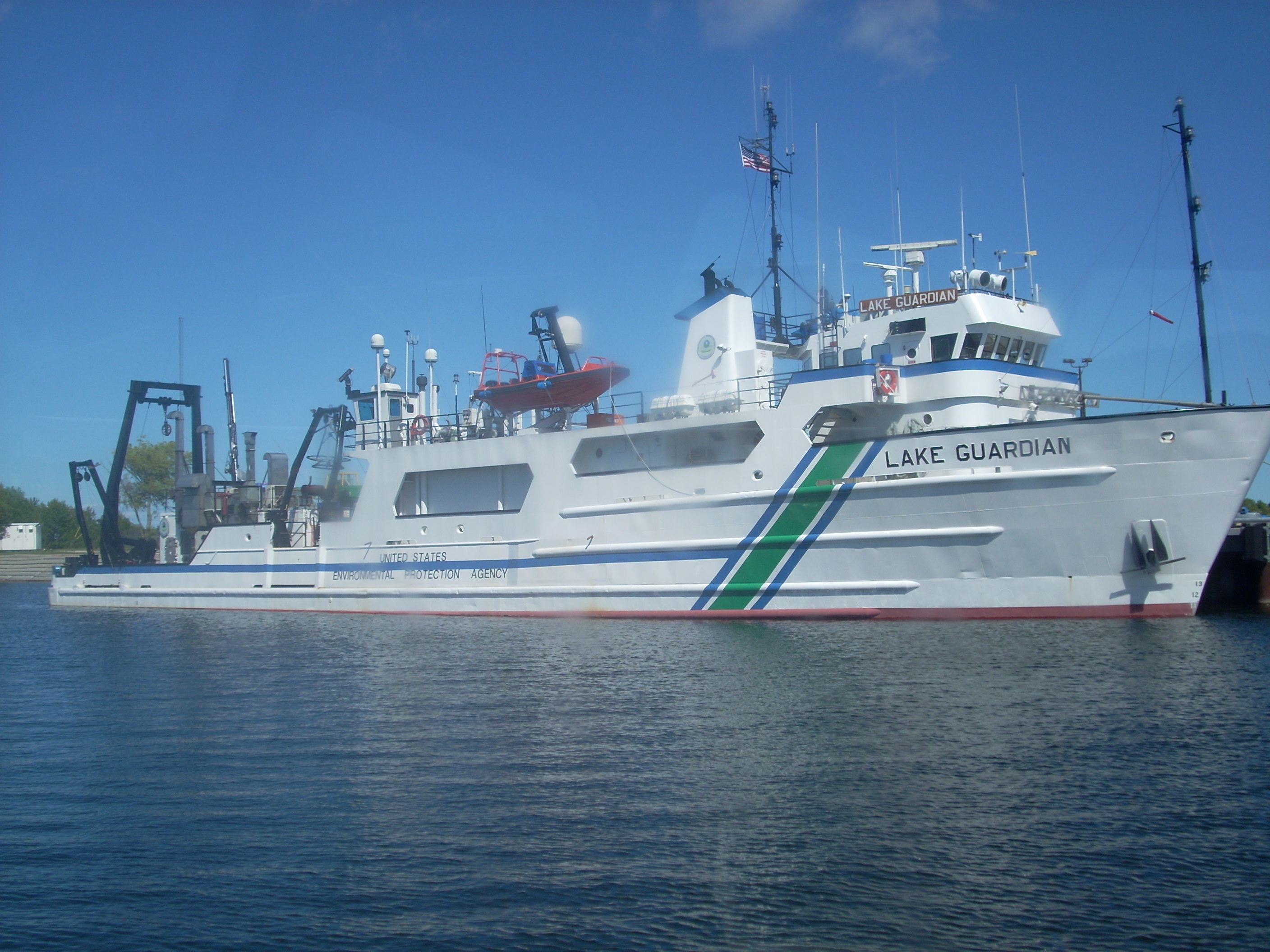
The Lake Guardian moored in the Cheboygan Harbor.
