= CCGS Griffon =

Canadian Coast Guard High Endurance Multi-Tasked Vessel and Light Icebreaker

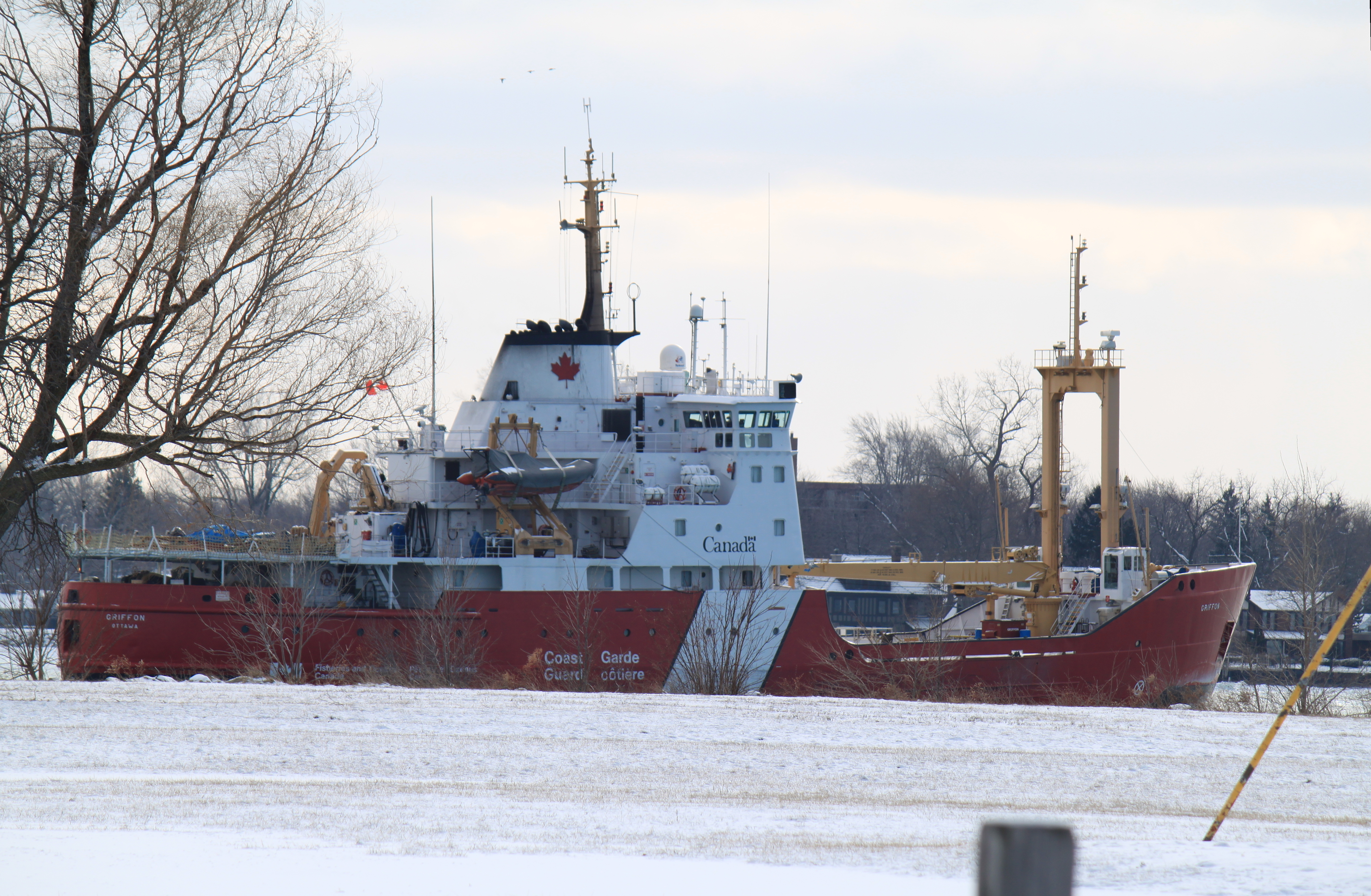
- CCGS Griffon patrolling the Detroit River

History

Canada
- Name: Griffon
- Operator: Canadian Coast Guard
- Port of registry: Ottawa
- Builder: Davie Shipbuilding, Lauzon
- Yard number: 664
- Launched: 26 September 1969
- Completed: April 1970
- In service: December 1970
- Refit: 1995 by Pascol Engineering
- Home port: CCG Base Prescott, Ontario (Central and Arctic Region)
- Identification: IMO number: 7022887; MMSI number: 316286000; Callsign: CGDS
- Status: Ship in active service

General characteristics
- Type: Light Icebreaker
- Tonnage: 2,212 GT
- Displacement: 3,096 tonnes (3,412.76 short tons) fully loaded
- Length: 71.3 m (233 ft 11 in)
- Beam: 15.1 m (49 ft 6 in)
- Draught: 4.73 m (15 ft 6 in)
- Ice class: CASPPR Arctic Class 2
- Propulsion: 4 × Fairbanks-Morse 38D8-1/8 8 cylinder Diesel electric engine; 3,936 kW (5,278 hp); 2 motors 3,982 hp (2,969 kW), 2 shafts
- Speed: 11 knots (20 km/h; 13 mph) cruise; 14 knots (26 km/h; 16 mph) maximum
- Range: 5,500 nmi (10,200 km) at 10 kn (19 km/h)
- Endurance: 90 days
- Boats & landing craft carried: 1 – Boston Whaler (Davits); 2 – SP Barge (Davits); 3 – SP Barge (Crane); 4 – Workboat (Davits)
- Complement: 25
- Sensors & processing systems: Sperre S-Band and X-Band navigational radar
- Aircraft carried: 1 × MBB Bo 105 or Bell 206B helicopter
- Aviation facilities: Helicopter deck only

Canadian Coast Guard Ship Griffon is a Canadian Coast Guard (CCG) high endurance multi-tasked vessel and light icebreaker stationed in Prescott, Ontario, Canada. Completed in 1970, Griffon provides icebreaking services along eastern Lake Ontario and upriver along the Saint Lawrence River to Montreal.

== Design and description ==
A Type 1100 buoy tender, Griffon displaces 3,096 tonnes (3,413 short tons) fully loaded, with a gross tonnage of 2,212 and a deadweight tonnage of 786 tons. The ship is 71.3 metres (233 ft 11 in) long overall and 65.2 metres (213 ft 11 in) with a beam of 15.1 metres (49 ft 6 in) and a draught of 4.73 metres (15 ft 6 in).

The ship is propelled by two shafts powered by four Fairbanks-Morse 38D8-1/8 8 cylinder diesel-electric generators that generate 3,936 kilowatts (5,278 hp) sustained driving two motors creating 3,982 horsepower (2,969 kW). This gives the ship a maximum speed of 14 knots (26 km/h; 16 mph) and a range of 5,500 nautical miles (10,200 km; 6,300 mi) at 10 knots (19 km/h; 12 mph). The ship is rated as Arctic Class 2, and has an endurance of 90 days.

The ship has a crew of 25. The ship has a 118-square-metre (1,270 sq ft) flight deck to land helicopters, but unlike larger Canadian Coast Guard vessels she has no hangar. The ship is capable of operating either the MBB Bo 105 or Bell 206B helicopters.

== History ==
Named after the sailing vessel Le Griffon, the ship's keel was laid by Davie Shipbuilding in Lauzon, Quebec. The ship was launched on 26 September 1969 and completed in April 1970. Griffon entered service in December 1970 as the last of the first group of diesel-electric vessels to enter service with the Canadian Coast Guard. The ship was deployed to the Great Lakes region, however has sailed as far as Hudson Bay.

In 1976, the Norwegian merchant vessel King Star engines failed on the Canadian side of Lake Erie. With gale force winds blowing the ship was unable to anchor due to frozen hawser. Griffon was dispatch and towed the Norwegian merchant vessel to Cleveland.

In February 1977, a late winter Canadian Great Lakes convoy of three tankers was created to deliver much-needed fuel oil and chemical supplies to sites on Lake Superior. Griffon was deployed to break ice for the convoy. However, the ship was not equal to the task as the ice proved thicker than Griffon was designed to break. While en route to Sault Ste. Marie and Thunder Bay, Griffon got stuck in the ice at the mouth of Georgian Bay. This then required the intervention of the US icebreaker USCGC Westwind, which took eight hours to free the Canadian ships.

In March 1987, the ship was one of six icebreakers deployed from both US and Canadian coast guards in an effort to break the ice damming the St. Clair River, which drains Lake Huron into Lake St. Clair. The ice had grown thick enough that the river had been closed to all commercial maritime traffic until the operation was completed.

In December 1989, Griffon was deployed to the Great Lakes to aid several vessels that became stuck in ice following an unusually extreme cold period. On 18 March 1991, while operating off Long Point, Ontario, in Lake Erie, Griffon collided with the fishing trawler Captain K of Port Dover, Ontario. The fishing vessel sank almost immediately, and the three crew aboard died. Their bodies were recovered. In the Transportation Safety Board of Canada review of the incident, it was found that both vessels were at fault for the collision.

In 2004, Griffon and CCGS Samuel Risley were ordered to Lake Erie to search for the remains of a Cessna plane carrying 10 people that crashed into the lake. The search took place off Pelee Island as the plane was bound for Windsor, Ontario.

On 13 February 2009, the vessel broke ice at the mouth of the Grand River that had caused a flood in the small towns of Dunnville and Cayuga, Ontario.

In February 2015, Griffon, working with Samuel Risley, freed the US merchant vessel Arthur M. Anderson which had been trapped in ice on Lake Erie for five days near Conneaut, Ohio. On 15 July 2015, the Government of Canada announced that a contract was awarded to Heddle Marine Service Incorporated for $2.7 million to perform a refit for Griffon.

On 26 August 2020, the Government of Canada announced that a contract was awarded to Heddle Marine Service Incorporated for $4 million to perform a refit for Griffon. In February 2023, Griffon was deployed to Lake Huron to search for debris on an unknown object that was shot down over the Great Lakes by the United States Air Force.
