= Kitano (container ship) =

History

Japan
- Name: Kitano
- Operator: Nippon Yusen Kaisha
- Launched: 15 November 1989
- Out of service: 2011
- Identification: IMO number: 8914001; Callsign: 3EWP6
- Fate: Scrapped November 2011

General characteristics
- Type: Container ship
- Tonnage: 50,618 GT
- Length: 288.31 m (945 ft 11 in)
- Draught: 13.025 m (42 ft 8.8 in)
- Propulsion: 31,538 kW (42,293 hp), single screw
- Capacity: 3,618 TEU
- Crew: 22

Kitano was a Japanese container ship. She was delivered in Japan in 1990 to Japanese container line NYK and scrapped in China in November 2011.

== 2001 fire ==
Kitano left the Port of New York at 0730 on 21 March 2001. At 1600 Kitano's crew observed that a container had caught fire. The container that caught fire contained 14 tons of activated carbon pellets impregnated with potassium hydroxide (caustic potash). Most of the pellets were in open mesh bags on wooden pallets. Two nearby containers were: "...loaded with barrels of camphene-90 wax, a class 4.1 dangerous cargo."

At 1636 Kitano requested assistance. Halifax, Nova Scotia, Canada was the nearest port. Search and rescue aircraft were dispatched, as were several surface vessels, CFAV Firebird, CCGS Earl Grey and CCGS Sambro. When the vessels were dispatched the wind was at force 8. The weather conditions proved too extreme for the 140-ton Firebird, the Canadian Forces' dedicated fireboat, to leave harbour. The Canadian Coast Guard vessels arrived, but the weather prohibited anything beyond standing by. HMCS Moncton and HMCS Goose Bay arrived several hours later. CCGS Sir William Alexander arrived at 0500 the next morning.

The vessel's Japanese owners contracted for assistance from Secunda Marine Services, the owners of the ocean-going salvage tug Ryan Leet.

It was not considered safe to allow Kitano to enter Halifax Harbour for almost 24 hours because of the danger of the fire spreading to the containers filled with camphene-90 wax. Kitano's crew had been fighting the fire without assistance for 25 hours before they received any outside assistance due to the bad weather.

The fire was extinguished by 2215. The contents of fifteen containers were damaged by the fire or by the fire fighting efforts. Kitano departed Halifax on 26 March 2001 with the rest of her cargo.
