= Capsizing of Halifax fireboat 08-448B =

Maritime incidents in Canada

Halifax fireboat 08-448B capsized while undergoing her acceptance exercises on September 17, 2008.

Fireboat 08-448B is a fireboat which was to be stationed in Halifax, Nova Scotia, that was the subject of a Transportation Safety Board of Canada investigation, after it capsized on September 17, 2008.

The fireboat is notable because, as a result of the inquiry, changes were made to the regulations governing all small craft in all of Canada. The results of the inquiry were noted by transportation safety organizations in other countries.

specifications
length	7.58 metres (24.9 ft)
gross tonnage	2.21 tons
power	2 x 250 horsepower (190 kW) outboard engines; 1 x 315 horsepower (235 kW) inboard engine either powers the water cannons, or a jet drive
speed	33 knots (61 km/h)
complement	maximum 6 seated occupants
owner	Harbor Guard Boats, Costa Mesa, California

The vessel had been delivered to Halifax by the manufacturer, Harbor Guard Boats of Costa Mesa, California but remained the property of Harbor Guard Boats while completing testing and familiarization training. On September 18, 2008 the vessel was completing the last of five half-day familiarization training excursions in Halifax Harbour. On board were five Halifax firefighters, Costa Mesa's local sales representative, a trainer sent by Costa Mesa, and a local representative from the Canadian Coast Guard.

According to the Transportation Safety Board of Canada report, one of the firefighters inquired whether the vessel was proceeding with a load beyond its capacity, and was told, by the trainer, that the load would not be an issue. According to the report, the trainer initially managed the controls. Then one of the firefighters took the controls and, while executing a 180 degree turn under the trainer's direction, experienced what he regarded as excessive heeling. He relaxed power to the vessel's throttles, but was directed, by the trainer to instead give the throttles full power. When he complied the vessel did not recover, but instead capsized.

All eight occupants were rescued by CCGS Sambro without serious injury. Five of the occupants had been temporarily trapped in the pilot house, after the vessel capsized.

The report was critical of the design of the inner latches on the port and starboard doors to the pilot house. It was determined that they could easily be inadvertently locked. In addition it was determined that the finger recess was too small and that one door had actually been installed upside down.

The report was critical of other aspects of the vessel's design, including that the outlet of the bilge pump was too close to the water level, and was not protected by a valve to prevent outside water flooding the bilge.

The report noted that the vessel's controls were equipped with a dead man's lanyard, which would have cut the engine, when the pilot was no longer manning the controls. The report noted that the cover to the inboard engine was not secured.

The report noted that the manual supplied with the vessel was designed for another vessel, that it said the recommended load should not be exceeded, but neglected to state what that maximum load was.

The report noted that the recommendations of the maximum number of occupants was based on assuming the average weight of the occupants would not exceed 75 kilograms (165 lb), but that the occupants average weight was actually 95 kilograms (209 lb).
