= Ryan Leet =

History
- Name: Ryan Leet; Abeille Provence; Salvor Commander
- Owner: OMSS Panama Inc./ Justin Beaune
- Operator: Offshore Marine Supply Services Inc./ Justin Beaune
- Port of registry: Panama
- Route: Caribbean
- Launched: 24 March 1977
- Identification: IMO number: 7518977; MMSI number: 316262000; Callsign: HP5251
- Status: Operational

General characteristics
- Type: Supply tug
- Tonnage: 1,473 GRT
- Length: 66.70 m (218 ft 10 in)
- Beam: 13.00 m (42 ft 8 in)
- Draft: 5.80 m (19 ft 0 in)
- Ice class: DNV 1A1 ICE-C
- Installed power: 2 x 7,200 bhp (5,400 kW)
- Speed: 15 knots (28 km/h; 17 mph)
- Notes: Firefighting capabilities; 3 × 250 m^{3}/h monitors; 20 tonne foam storage capacity

Ryan Leet is an ocean-going salvage/supply tugboat. The tugboat is owned and operated by Offshore Marine Supply Services Inc. Justin Beaune its registered director and owner. The vessel is based in Panama, and operating in the Caribbean. As of 2022 she is used for towing of ships and barges, supply, ship-to-ship fuel transfers and fire and rescue.

Ryan Leet was built in Belgium for the French Government to aid tankers sailing along the French coastal area. Ryan Leet was one of two such heavy salvage tugs stationed offshore in the French sector of the English Channel, as well on the western coast of France and the Bay of Biscay. Her sole task was to escort "supertankers" and to be ready to tow these tankers if they broke down. Ryan Leet has the horsepower to tow supertankers up 250,000 tons deadweight (DWT). She is also equipped with a firefighting and azimuth bow thruster DP1 system. Unique to a ship her size, she is fitted with dual towing cables, the first a 1,800-metre (5,900 ft) cable with a diameter of 64 millimetres (2.5 in), and the second being 1,800 m with 54 mm (2.1 in) thickness. She has a fuel storage capacity of 1,000 metric tons (980 long tons; 1,100 short tons). The vessel was equipped with new dual engines and generators rebuilt in 1994, (EMD V20-645 E7B).

She was launched in 1978 and was previously known as Abeille Provence and Salvor Commander.

Among the vessels whose rescue or salvage she participated in were the container ship Kitano, the roll-on/roll-off vessel Camilla and the bulk carrier Lake Carling.
