= CFAV Firebird =

Royal Canadian Navy fireboat

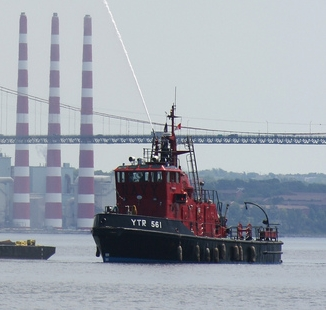
- CFAV Firebird in Halifax

History

Canada
- Name: Firebird
- Operator: Royal Canadian Navy (1978–2014); Sealand Diesel Services LTD. (2018–present)
- Builder: Vancouver Shipyards, North Vancouver
- Commissioned: 1978
- Out of service: 4 December 2014
- Home port: CFB Halifax
- Identification: YTR 561
- Status: Removed from service 4 December 2014

General characteristics
- Class & type: Fire-class fireboat
- Displacement: 140 tonnes (138 long tons)
- Length: 23.1 m (75 ft 9 in)
- Beam: 6.4 m (21 ft)
- Draught: 2.6 m (8 ft 6 in)
- Propulsion: 2 × 365 hp azimuthing Z-drives; 1 × hydraulic tunnel bow thruster
- Speed: 11 knots (13 mph; 20 km/h)
- Complement: 5
- Equipment: 3 × manually-controlled 3-inch (7.6 cm) water cannon 2 × diesel-driven fire pumps, 2,500 gpm at 150 psi each

CFAV Firebird was a Fire-class fireboat in the Royal Canadian Navy designed by Robert Allan Ltd. Firebird was based in CFB Halifax, in Halifax, Nova Scotia. Her sister ship CFAV Firebrand is based in CFB Esquimalt.

Her three water cannons can fire water, or fire suppressant foam from her two 250 gallon tanks.

== Design and construction ==
According to the Canadian American Strategic Review the class was designed by naval architects Robert Allan Limited, and were built at Vancouver Shipyards in North Vancouver in 1978, and later acquired by the Canadian Forces.

The two ships displaced 140 tonnes (138 long tons) and were 23.1 metres (75 ft 9 in) long, with a beam of 6.4 metres (21 ft) and a draught of 2.6 metres (8 ft 6 in). The ships were powered by two 365 horsepower (272 kW) Z-drives and one hydraulic tunnel bow thruster. This gave the vessels a maximum speed of 11 knots (20 km/h; 13 mph). The ships had a crew of five firefighters.

The Fire class was equipped with three manually-controlled 3-inch (76 mm) water cannons, two diesel-driven fire pumps capable of expending 2,500 gpm at 150 psi each.

== Operational history ==
On 22 March 2001 a large container vessel, Kitano, one day out of New York City, requested help fighting an onboard fire after she had gone to sea. Because of the extreme weather, Firebird was unable to leave the protected waters of Halifax Harbour to go to Kitano's aid; larger Navy vessels were dispatched instead.

Firebird suppressed a serious fire in HMCS Toronto's engine room in 2005. In 2008, the firefighting ship aided the Halifax Regional Fire and Emergency department in extinguishing a fire aboard a former Canadian Coast Guard ship CCGS Tupper.

In January 2014 it was announced that Firebird's time available for firefighting operations would be cut back due to budget reductions and that all operations on weekends would be suspended. It was announced that on 4 December 2014, Firebird was taken out of service and declared surplus.
