= Rouille (ship) =

Canadian steam fireboat, built in 1929

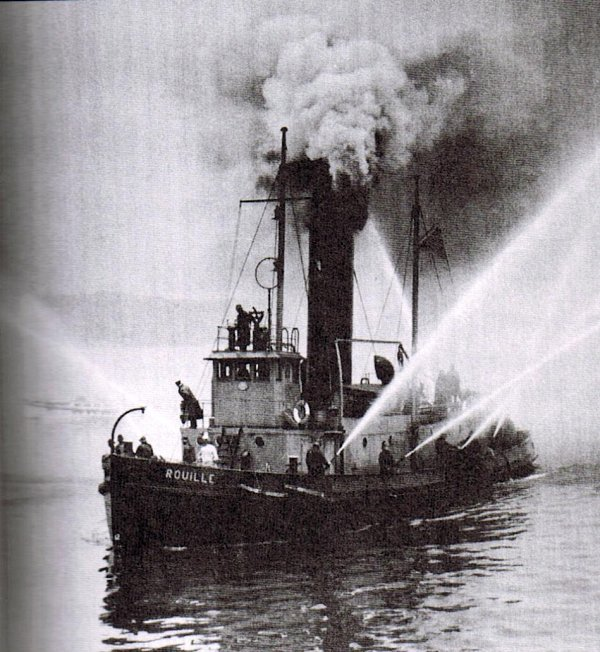
Rouille in 1941.

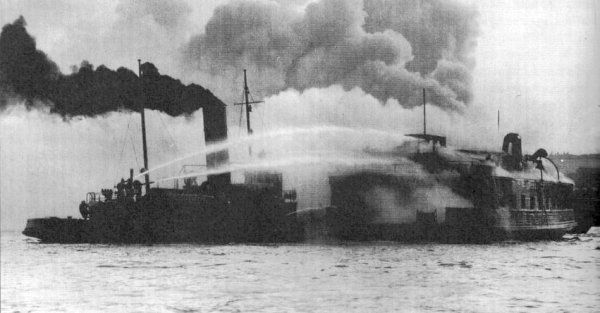
Rouille fighting a fire in Halifax during WW2.

The Rouille (later HMCS Rouille) was a Canadian fireboat. She was a steam-powered vessel, built in Collingwood, Ontario on October 26, 1929.

She served in Toronto, up until World War II. During World War II the Rouille was transferred to Halifax, Nova Scotia, the port where most Atlantic convoys assembled.

According to the Maritime History of the Great Lakes she sank off Cape Smoky, Nova Scotia, during bad weather, on March 11, 1954.

specifications
tonnage	214
length	100 feet (30 m)
beam	25 feet (7.6 m)
draft	13 feet (4.0 m)
