= Canadian American Strategic Review =

Canadian think tank

The Canadian American Strategic Review was an influential Canadian think-tank that comments on Canadian Defence and sovereignty issues. The think-tank operated, for many years, from the campus of Simon Fraser University. It shut down in 2016.

== History ==
In 2007, the Canwest News Services cited one of the think-tank's papers on the option of employing Canadian Forces smaller CH-146 Griffon helicopters to Afghanistan.

In 2008, the US Naval War College's International Law Studies cited one of the think-tank's papers on Canadian Prime Minister Stephen Harper's 2005 change in Defence policy.

In 2009, Peter Worthington cited one of the review's papers that statistically analyzed the safety of the vehicles the Canadian Forces used in Afghanistan.

In 2016, Steven Chase repeatedly quoted the Review's Stephen Priestley when The Globe and Mail reported on how Saudi Arabia used Canadian made light armored vehicles in ways that violated their export license. The reporting raised questions about a new Saudi order for an additional $15 billion order. Nominally the vehicles were purchased for Saudi Arabia's National Guard, but news footage showed them being used by the Saudi army's expeditionary force, against rebel forces in Yemen, a violation of the export license.

The group's website was officially closed down on 31 December 2016.

In her bibliography of Polar Imperative: A History of Arctic Sovereignty in North America, Shelagh D. Grant described the think tank as one of two sources of "particular significance".
