= Canadian Naval Ensign =

Flag of the Royal Canadian Navy

- Use: Naval ensign
- Proportion: 1:2
- Adopted: 1968 as jack; 2013 as ensign
- Design: White field, in the canton the National Flag of Canada, in the fly an eagle superimposed on an anchor beneath a naval crown, all blue
- Use: Naval jack
- Proportion: 1:2
- Adopted: 1965 as jack and ensign; 1968 as ensign; 2013 re-adopted as jack
- Design: The national flag of Canada: A vertical triband of red (hoist-side and fly-side) and white (double width) with the red maple leaf centred on the white band.

The Canadian Naval Ensign (French: pavillon naval canadien) is the flag worn at the stern or (optionally when at sea) at the gaff of His Majesty's Canadian Ships. The ensign is also the flag of the Royal Canadian Navy (RCN) and is used on land in this capacity.

The ensign consists of a white flag with the National Flag of Canada in the canton, and in the fly a navy blue emblem comprising an anchor, an eagle and a naval crown. The ensign's emblem is similar to the central device of the former RCN badge (which was redesigned in 2016), but replacing Saint Edward's Crown with a naval crown.

== History ==
Prior to the creation of the RCN, Canadian Government Ships of the Fisheries Protection Service had to use a defaced Blue Ensign with colonial badge as per the Colonial Naval Defence Act 1865.

The current ensign was introduced in 1968, and it replaced the national flag as the naval jack of the Canadian Forces. Naval jacks are worn at the bow of warships, but only when anchored or docked during daylight hours or when "dressing overall" for special occasions. The national flag had replaced both the White Ensign at the ensign staff and the Canadian Blue Ensign at the jack staff in 1965, and the national flag remained the ensign of Canadian Forces' ships after the introduction of the new jack. Effective May 5, 2013 (Battle of the Atlantic Sunday), the two flags switched roles: the white flag with the maple leaf canton became the ensign, and the national flag became the jack.

The commissioning pennant was the same as that used by the UK's Royal Navy until the early 1990s, at which point it was progressively phased out in favour of a new pennant of Canadian design, where the maple leaf replaces Saint George's Cross.

The Royal Navy's commissioning pennant was used until the early 1990s

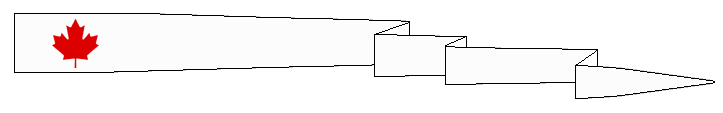
The Royal Canadian Navy's commissioning pennant in use since the 1990s.

Canadian naval flags
Period	Ensign	Jack
1910–1911		
1911–1922		
1922–1957		
1957–1965		
1965–1968		
1968–2013		
2013–present		

== See also ==
- Naval heraldry
- Jack (flag)
