= Royal Canadian Navy Monument =

Memorial park in Ottawa, Ontario, Canada

- National Capital Commission and the Royal Canadian Navy
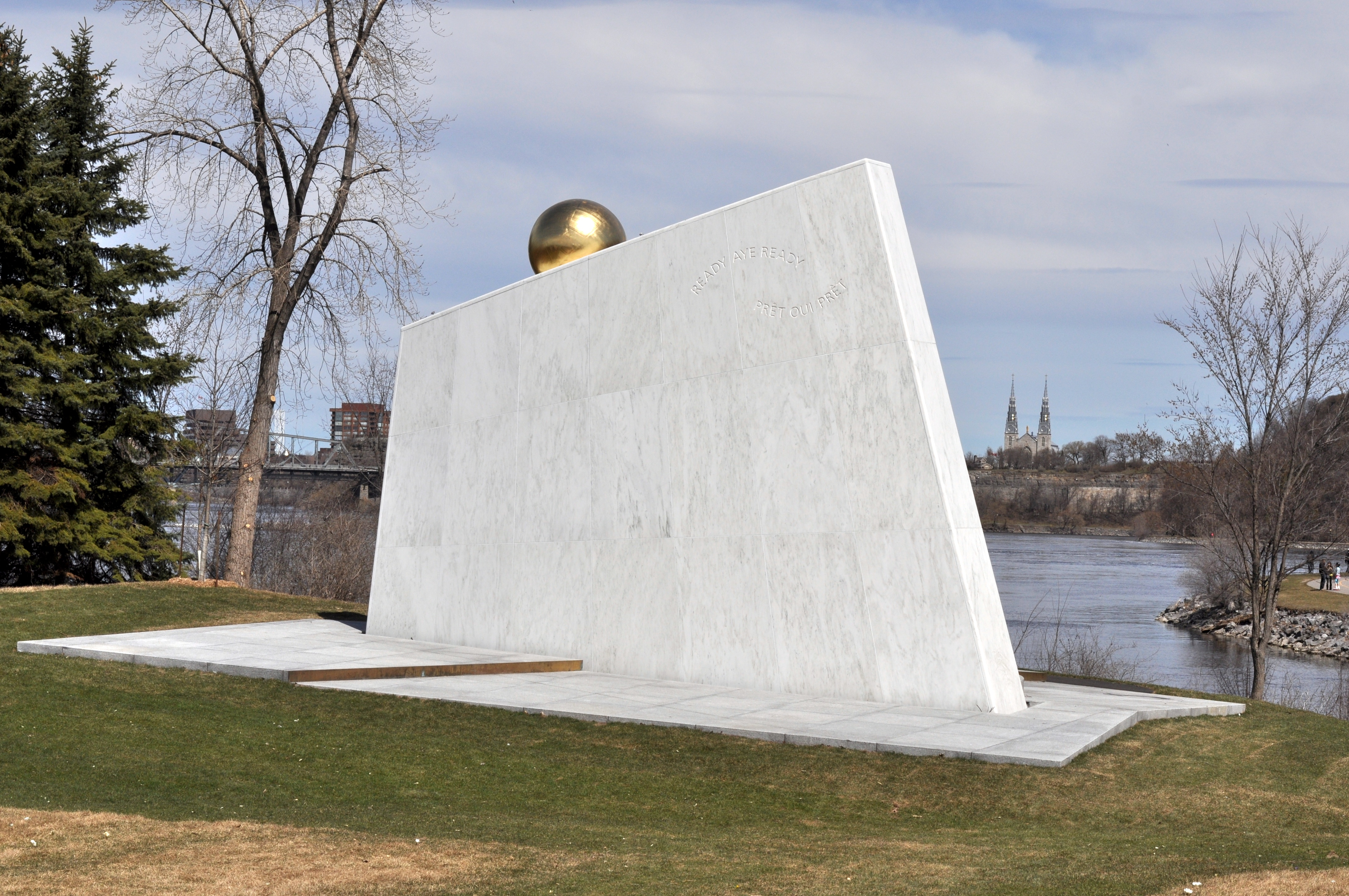
- The large, marble-clad, sail-like focal feature of the Royal Canadian Navy Monument
- For the men and women of the Royal Canadian Navy
- Unveiled: 3 May 2012
- Location: 45°25′14.99″N 075°42′37.45″W near Ottawa, Ontario, Canada
- Designed by: Alan McWilliams, Joost Bakker and Bruce Haden
- Ready Aye Ready – Prêt Oui Prêt

The Royal Canadian Navy Monument is a small memorial park located at Richmond Landing, next to the Ottawa River in Ottawa, Ontario, Canada. It commemorates the men and women who have served or are currently serving in the Royal Canadian Navy. The monument was designed by artist Al McWilliams and architects Joost Bakker and Bruce Haden, and was officially opened by then Prime Minister of Canada, Stephen Harper, on 3 May 2012.

== Proposal and commissioning ==
In 2008, Captain John Pickford, then director of the Canadian Naval Centennial Project, submitted a proposal to the National Capital Commission (NCC) suggesting a new memorial site should be constructed within the Ottawa downtown area, as part of the country's commemoration of the 100th anniversary of the founding of the Royal Canadian Navy (RCN). The new memorial was intended to provide a focal location to raise public awareness of the RCN, enhance the beauty of Canada's capital city, and be a space which could be used for formal commemorations.

The Royal Canadian Navy Monument was commissioned by the NCC and RCN, who jointly launched a design competition in 2009. The competition attracted five final entries, and was won by a team based in Vancouver, British Columbia, comprising artist and sculptor Al McWilliams, and architects Joost Bakker and Bruce Haden. Although the time available following the competition was not enough to design and build the monument before the 100th anniversary itself, plans were sufficiently advanced to allow the NCC and RCN to host a groundbreaking ceremony to coincide with the official date on 4 May 2010. This was conducted by Vice-Admiral Dean McFadden of the RCN, and Russell Mills and Marie Lemay, respectively chairman and CEO of the NCC.

== Design and location ==
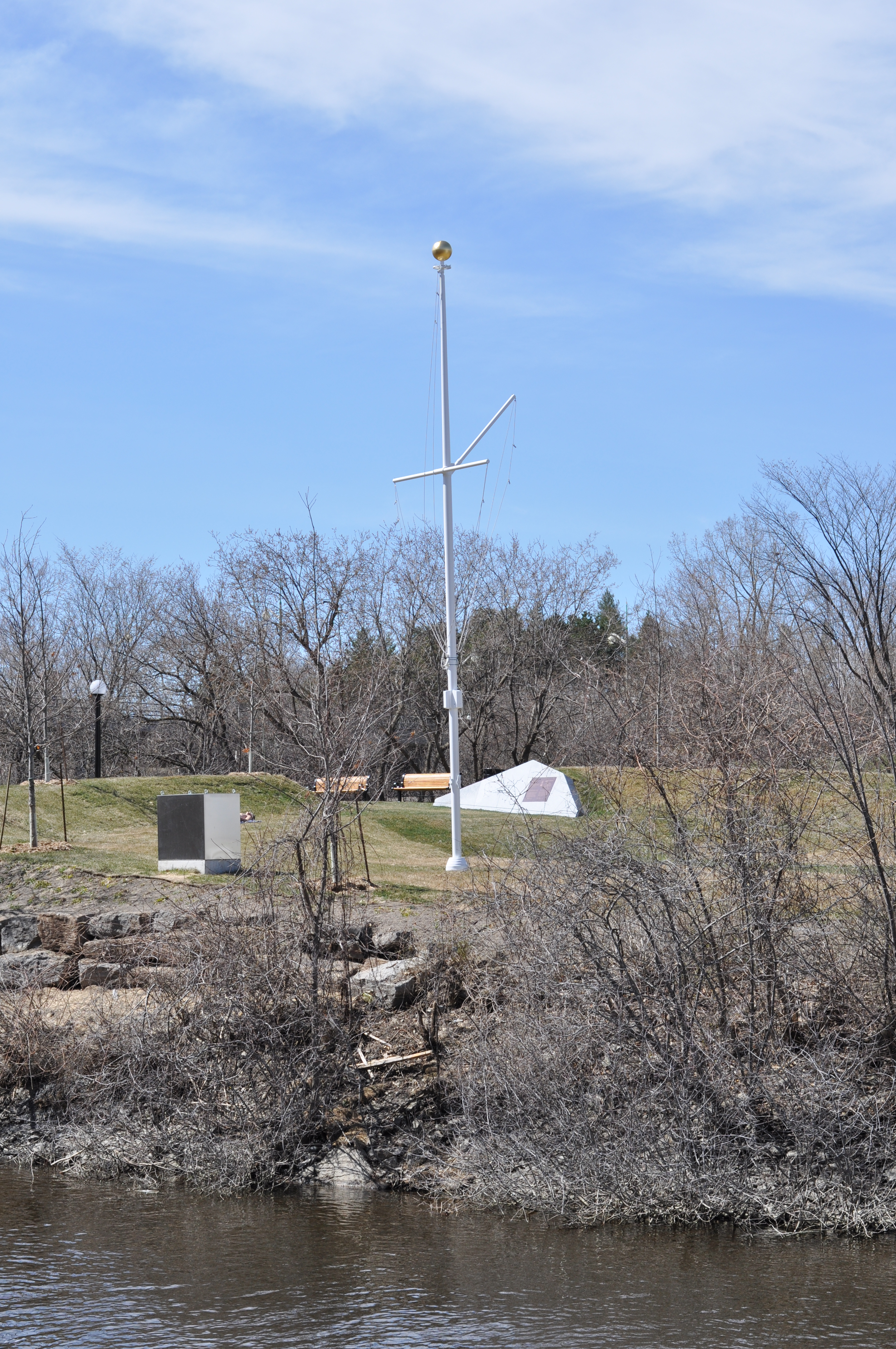
The mast and theatre entrance

The monument forms a small park, situated at the tip of Richmond Landing in Ottawa, Canada's capital. Richmond Landing is a short peninsula that projects into the Ottawa River from its southern, Ontario, bank, just to the east of Victoria Island and the Chaudière Falls, the highest point on the Ottawa River that is navigable from the sea. Richmond Landing was the arrival site for some of the first settlers in the Ottawa region. The monument is surrounded on three sides by the river and is overlooked by Parliament Hill, including the Centre Block of the Parliament of Canada. The NCC has described the site as providing "a powerful visceral feeling of flow and movement like a ship at sea ... contained within the wild river and expansive sky."

The monument consists of a shallow turf Roman theatre, approximately 25 m (82 ft) in diameter, that faces downriver to the east. The open end of the theatre is focused on a large, inclined sail-like feature, five to eight metres in height, that is clad in slightly mottled white marble and is topped by a 1.5 m (5 ft) gilded sphere, somewhat offset. On the western face of the north–south orientated sail the motto "Ready Aye Ready" and its French translation, "Prêt Oui Prêt", are carved in the uppermost corner. The theatre honours of the Royal Canadian Navy are carved into the eastern face. The sail is set into a pavement of pale grey granite, with a fouled anchor symbol inlaid in contrasting black granite. A white mast carrying a yard, gaff and rigging, topped by a small gilded sphere, is situated to the south of the amphitheatre's open area. The monument is approached via an entrance from the landward end of the peninsula, cut through the western side of the theatre bank, that is lined with the same grey granite as surrounds the focal sail.

The design evokes a number of aspects of Canada and its navy, and was intended as "a form and space charged with meaning". Being surrounded on three sides by water, the position of the monument reflects Canada's own geographical position. The colours of the monument – white, black and gold – are those of the Royal Canadian Navy. The sail-like feature carries multiple interpretations, including a sail, a ship's hull, an iceberg or naval attire. The golden spheres used on both the sail and mast represent celestial bodies and the navy's global reach.
