= Royal Canadian Navy =

Maritime component of the Canadian Armed Forces

- Marine royale canadienne
- Badge of the RCN
- Founded: 4 May 1910; 116 years ago
- Country: Canada
- Type: Navy
- Role: Naval warfare
- Size: 42 ships Personnel: • Regular Force: 8,400 members (Note: In January 2026, it was reported that the RCN was 2,000 sailors short of meeting its 7,700 Regular Force benchmark at the time.) • Reserve Force: 4,100 members • Civilian employees: 3,800
- Part of: Canadian Armed Forces
- Headquarters: National Defence Headquarters, Ottawa, Ontario
- Motto: Parati vero parati (Latin for 'Ready aye ready')
- March: "Heart of Oak"
- Mascot: SONAR (Newfoundland dog)
- Anniversaries: Niobe Day
- Engagements: First World War; Second World War; Korean War; Persian Gulf War; War in Afghanistan; Operation Mobile; Operation Artemis; Operation Prosperity Guardian
- Website: www.canada.ca/en/navy.html

Commanders
- Commander of the RCN: Vice-Admiral Dan Charlebois
- Command CPO of RCN: CPO1 Pascal Harel

Insignia
- Naval ensign

- Naval jack

- Bilingual logo

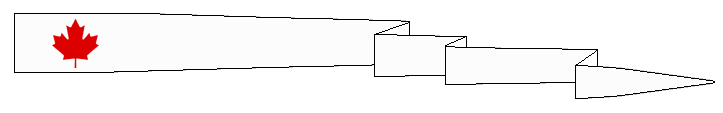
- Pennant

The Royal Canadian Navy (RCN; French: Marine royale canadienne, MRC) is the naval force of Canada, and one of three environmental commands of the Canadian Armed Forces. The command's official strength includes 8,400 Regular Force sailors, 4,100 naval reservists, and a fleet that includes 25 commissioned warships and additional auxiliary vessels.

The RCN is headquartered in Ottawa, with its commander reporting to the Chief of Defence Staff. Three formations are responsible to the commander of the RCN: Maritime Forces Atlantic, based at CFB Halifax on the Atlantic coast; Maritime Forces Pacific, based at CFB Esquimalt on the Pacific coast; and the Naval Reserve, headquartered in Quebec City with 24 reserve divisions located across the country.

Established in 1910 as the Naval Service of Canada, the service received royal sanction in 1911 and was renamed the Royal Canadian Navy. In 1968, the RCN was unified with the Canadian Army and the Royal Canadian Air Force to form the Canadian Armed Forces (CAF), the RCN becoming its naval command, Maritime Command. The historic Royal Canadian Navy designation was restored in 2011. The RCN took part in several conflicts including the First World War, Second World War, the Korean War, the Gulf War, the War in Afghanistan, and other NATO and UN peacekeeping missions.

== History ==
=== 1910–1968 ===
Established following the introduction of the Naval Service Act by Prime Minister Sir Wilfrid Laurier, the Naval Service of Canada (NSC) was intended as a distinct naval force for Canada that could, should the need arise, be placed under British control. The bill received Royal Assent on 4 May 1910. Initially equipped with two former British Royal Navy vessels, HMCS Niobe and Rainbow, King George V granted permission for the service to be known as the Royal Canadian Navy on 29 August 1911.

==== World Wars ====
During the first years of the First World War, the RCN's six-vessel naval force patrolled both the North American west and east coasts to deter the German naval threat, with a seventh ship, HMCS Shearwater, joining the force in 1915. Just before the end of the war in 1918, the Royal Canadian Naval Air Service was established with the purpose of carrying out anti-submarine operations; however, it was disbanded after the armistice of 11 November.

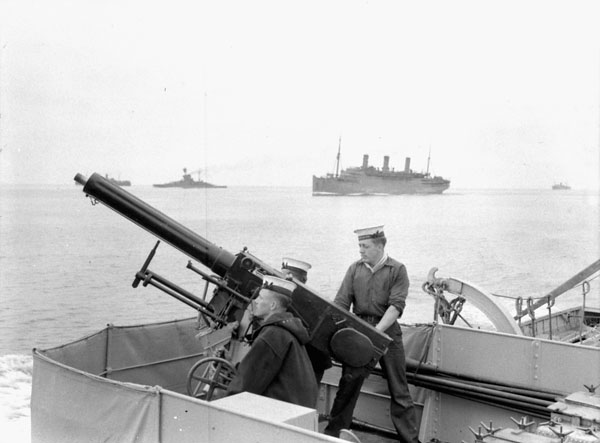
An RCN sailor at a gun aboard HMCS Assiniboine, while escorting an HX convoy, 1940

After the war, the RCN took over certain responsibilities of the Department of Transport's Marine Service and slowly started to build its fleet, with the first warships specifically designed for the RCN being commissioned in 1932. At the outbreak of the Second World War, the Navy had 11 combat vessels, 145 officers and 1,674 men. During the Second World War, the RCN expanded significantly, ultimately gaining responsibility for the entire Northwest Atlantic theatre of war. During the Battle of the Atlantic, the RCN sank 31 U-boats and sank or captured 42 enemy surface vessels, while completing 25,343 merchant crossings. The navy suffered the loss of 33 ships and 1,797 sailors. To gain experience with the operation of aircraft carriers, RCN personnel crewed two Royal Navy escort carriers from 1944 to 1946: HMS Nabob and Puncher.

Starting in May 1944, when Canada began drafting plans to assume a larger role in the Pacific Theatre after achieving victory in Europe, the Canadian government recognized that the RCN would require much larger vessels. Canadian naval staff advocated for HMS Nabob and Puncher to be given back to the Royal Navy in exchange for two light fleet carriers. The Canadian government agreed to acquire two carriers on loan from the Royal Navy, with an option to purchase them, but they were not ready before the war ended. Postwar budget cuts meant that Canada could only afford to operate one aircraft carrier, instead of two as originally planned. The RCN operated HMS Warrior from 1946 to 1948, before exchanging it with the Royal Navy for the slightly larger HMCS Magnificent.

==== Post-war period ====
From 1950 to 1955, during and after the Korean War, Canadian destroyers maintained a presence off of the Korean peninsula, engaging in shore bombardments and maritime interdiction. During the Cold War, the Navy developed an anti-submarine capability to counter the growing Soviet naval threat.

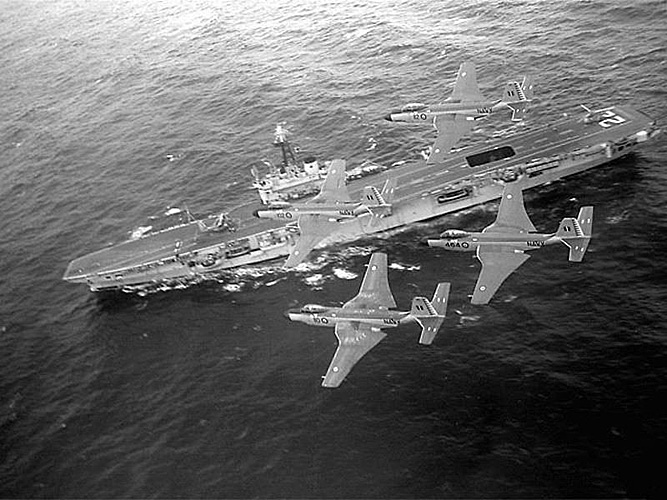
F2H-3 Banshees fly overhead HMCS Bonaventure aircraft carrier, c. 1950s

In November 1956, HMCS Magnificent was chosen to transport men and supplies to Egypt as part of Canada's response to the Suez Crisis. In preparation for use as a transport, the ship's weapons were stripped, and her complement was reduced to 600 personnel. The initial plan was to embark the Queen's Own Rifles of Canada, but that order was rescinded in December. Magnificent waited in Halifax until the end of the month, then sailed for Egypt carrying 406 Canadian troops and their vehicles, four Royal Canadian Air Force de Havilland Canada DHC-3 Otters, and a single H04S helicopter. She returned to Canada in March 1957. Later in 1957, the RCN paid off HMCS Magnificent and commissioned HMCS Bonaventure, which was better suited for jet aircraft. She flew the McDonnell F2H Banshee fighter jet until 1962, as well as various other anti-submarine aircraft until her decommissioning.

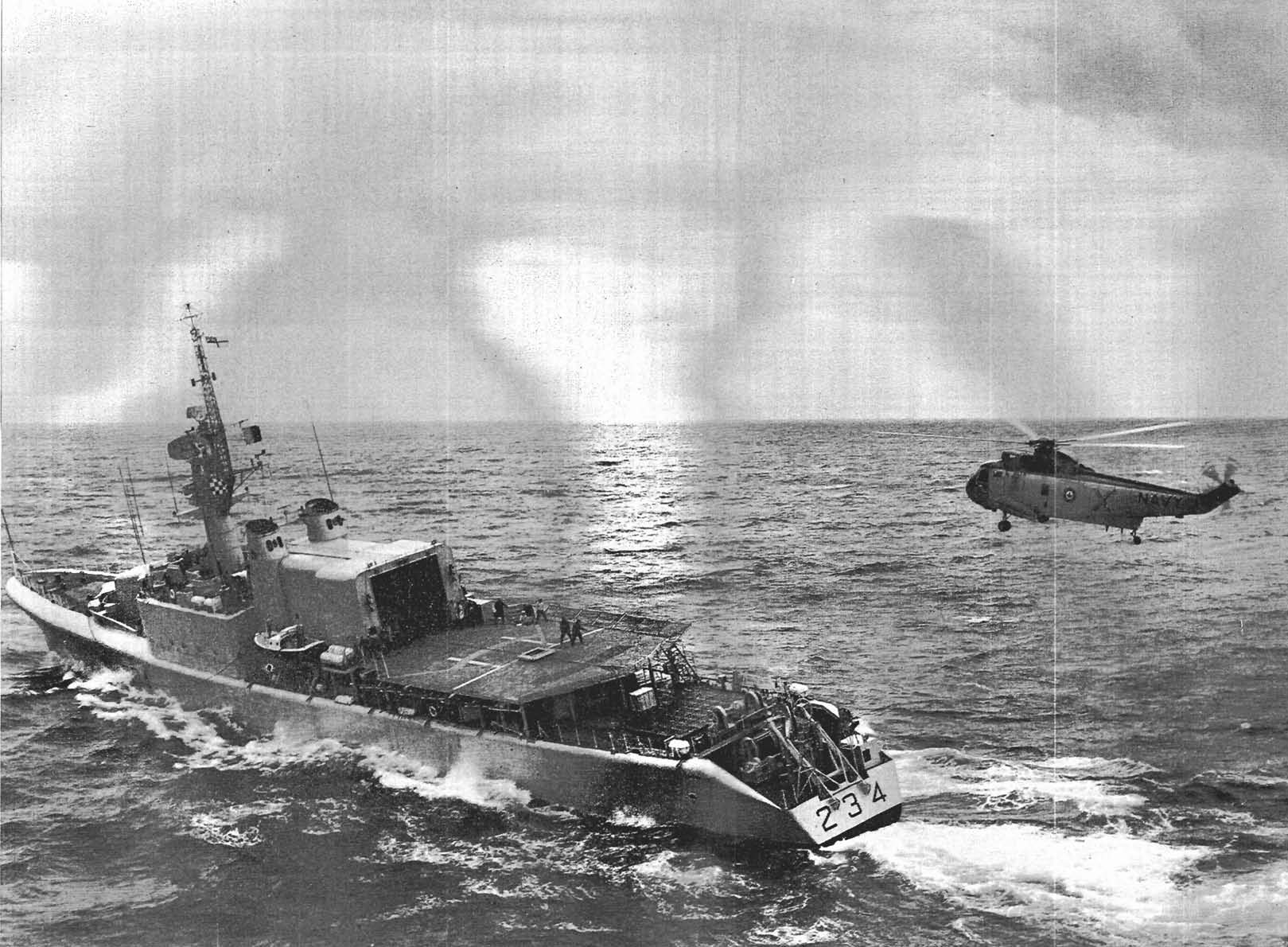
A CH-124 Sea King helicopter landing on HMCS Assiniboine with a beartrap on its deck, 1964

In the 1960s, the RCN retired most of its Second World War vessels, and further developed its anti-submarine warfare capabilities by acquiring the Sikorsky CH-124 Sea King, and successfully pioneered the use of large maritime helicopters on small surface vessels, having developed the beartrap to enable safe operations on small vessels. The beartrap was first trialed in 1963, with it entering operational service in the RCN in 1967. The beartrap was subsequently adopted by other navies, including Australia, Japan, and the US.

=== 1968–present ===
From 1964 through 1968, under Prime Minister Lester B. Pearson, the RCN, Royal Canadian Air Force and Canadian Army were amalgamated to form the Canadian Armed Forces. This process was overseen by then–defence minister Paul Hellyer. The controversial merger resulted in the abolition of the RCN as a separate legal entity. All personnel, ships, and aircraft became part of Maritime Command (MARCOM), an element of the CAF. The traditional naval uniform was eliminated and all naval personnel were required to wear the new CAF rifle green uniform, adopted also by former Royal Canadian Air Force and Canadian Army personnel. The unification of the Canadian Forces in 1968 was the first time that a nation with a modern military combined its formerly separate naval, land and air elements into a single service.

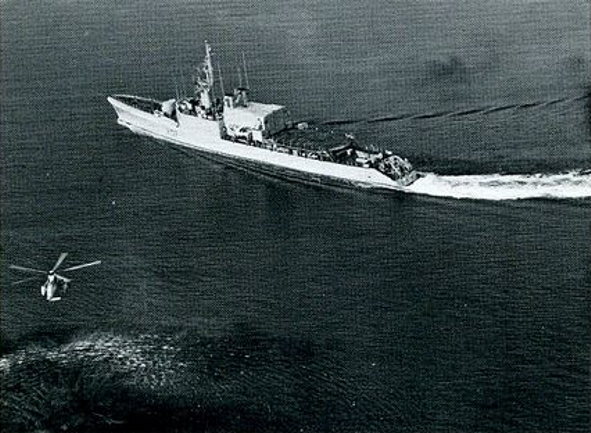
A CH-124 Sea King of Maritime Command's Maritime Air Group, flies towards HMCS Skeena, 1972. In 1975, control of the Maritime Air Group was transferred to Air Command.

Ship-borne aircraft continued to be under the command of MARCOM, while shore-based patrol aircraft of the former Royal Canadian Air Force were transferred to MARCOM. In 1975 Air Command was formed, with all air groups and their aircraft, including Maritime Command's Maritime Air Group were transferred to Air Command.

Following the Official Languages Act enshrinement in 1969, MARCOM instituted the French Language Unit, which constituted a francophone unit with the navy. The first was HMCS Ottawa. In the 1980s and 1990s, women were also accepted into the fleet, with the submarine service the last to allow them, beginning in 2001.

HMCS Bonaventure was sold off in 1970, shortly after completing a 16-month, $11 million mid-life refit. The 1970s saw the addition of four Iroquois-class destroyers, which were later updated to air defence destroyers, and in the late 1980s and 1990s the construction of 12 Halifax-class frigates and the purchase of the Victoria-class submarines.

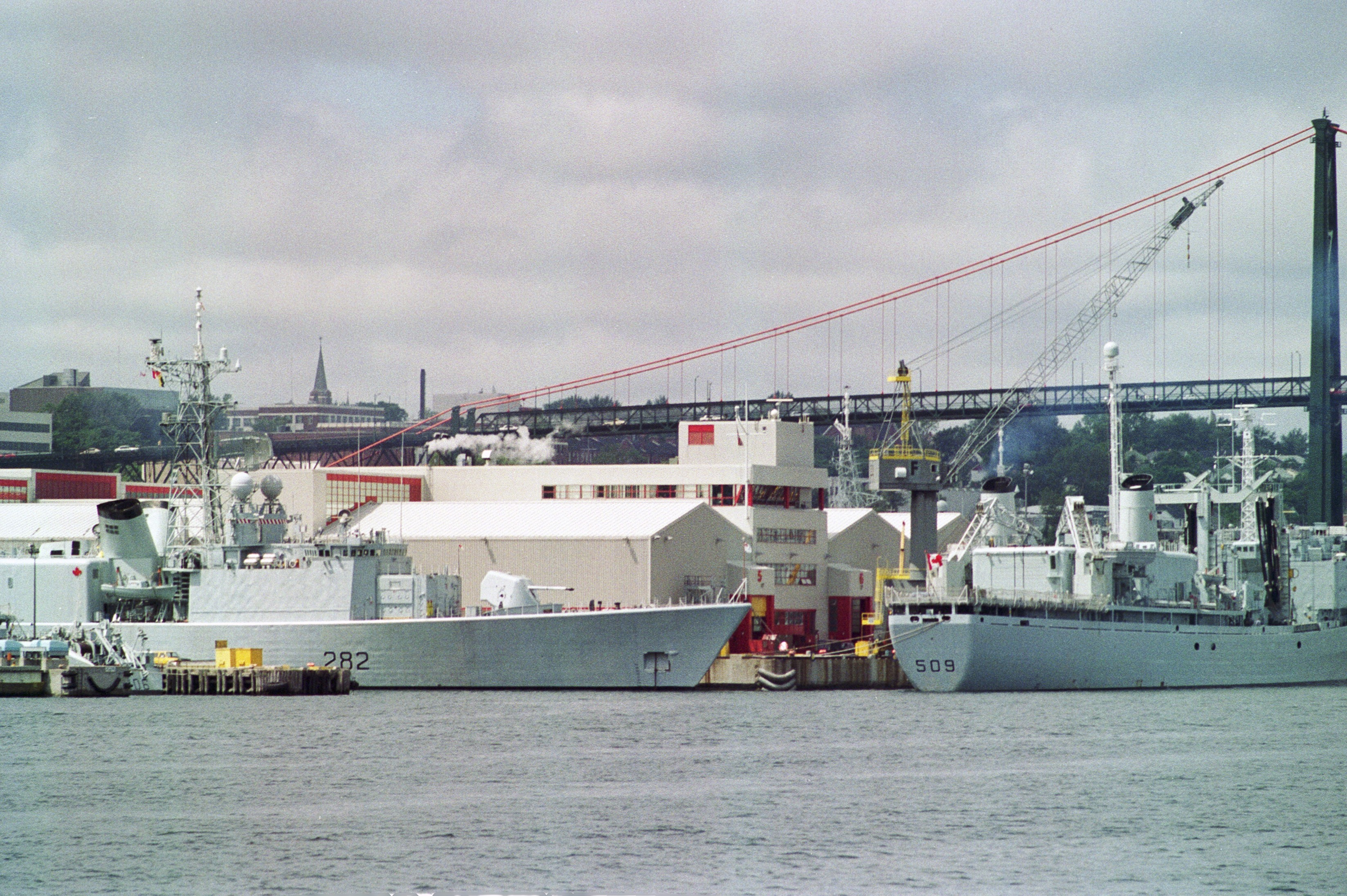
HMCS Athabaskan and Protecteur preparing to depart for the Persian Gulf in support of coalition forces during the Gulf War, 1990

In 1990, Canada deployed three warships to support coalition forces during the Gulf War. Later in the decade, ships were deployed to patrol the Adriatic Sea during the Yugoslav Wars and the Kosovo War. More recently, Maritime Command provided vessels to serve as a part of Operation Apollo and to combat piracy off the coast of Somalia.

Some of the changes that had taken place during the unification of the forces began to be undone. In 1985, MARCOM received new black uniforms, differentiating them from the land-based forces. By 1990, the three senior naval officers of MARCOM had recreated the Naval Board. On 16 August 2011, the historic names of the Canadian Forces' three environmental commands were restored with Maritime Command renamed the "Royal Canadian Navy".

With the loss of area air defence and resupply capabilities by 2015, the RCN was classified as a Rank 5 navy (offshore regional coastal defence) on the Todd-Lindberg navy classification system of naval strength, dropping from Rank 3 (multiregional power projection) in 2005. Vice-Admiral Angus Topshee, the commander of the RCN, indicated in 2023, the "effective strength" of the regular force was considerably lower with numerous naval trades having shortages in trained strength of more than 20 per cent. In late 2025, Topshee stated that the Navy's personnel problem had not been solved and remained dire, while the Auditor General of Canada reported deeper systemic problems with Canadian military recruitment.

In December 2025, Iran designated the RCN as a terrorist organization, in response to the Canadian government's designation of the Islamic Revolutionary Guard Corps as a terrorist entity.

== Structure ==
The Royal Canadian Navy is the maritime component of the Canadian Armed Forces, led by the commander of the Royal Canadian Navy. The commander, typically a vice-admiral, is based at Naval Staff Headquarters in Ottawa. In addition to the commander, Naval Staff Headquarters also includes the deputy commander, typically a rear admiral, and the Chief Petty Officer of the Navy, the command's senior non-commissioned sailor. The RCN has three formations responsible to the commander of the RCN: Maritime Forces Atlantic, Maritime Forces Pacific, and the Canadian Forces Naval Reserve.

The commander of the RCN reports to the chief of Defence Staff, who, in turn, reports to the minister of National Defence, the head of the Department of National Defence.

=== Maritime Forces Atlantic ===
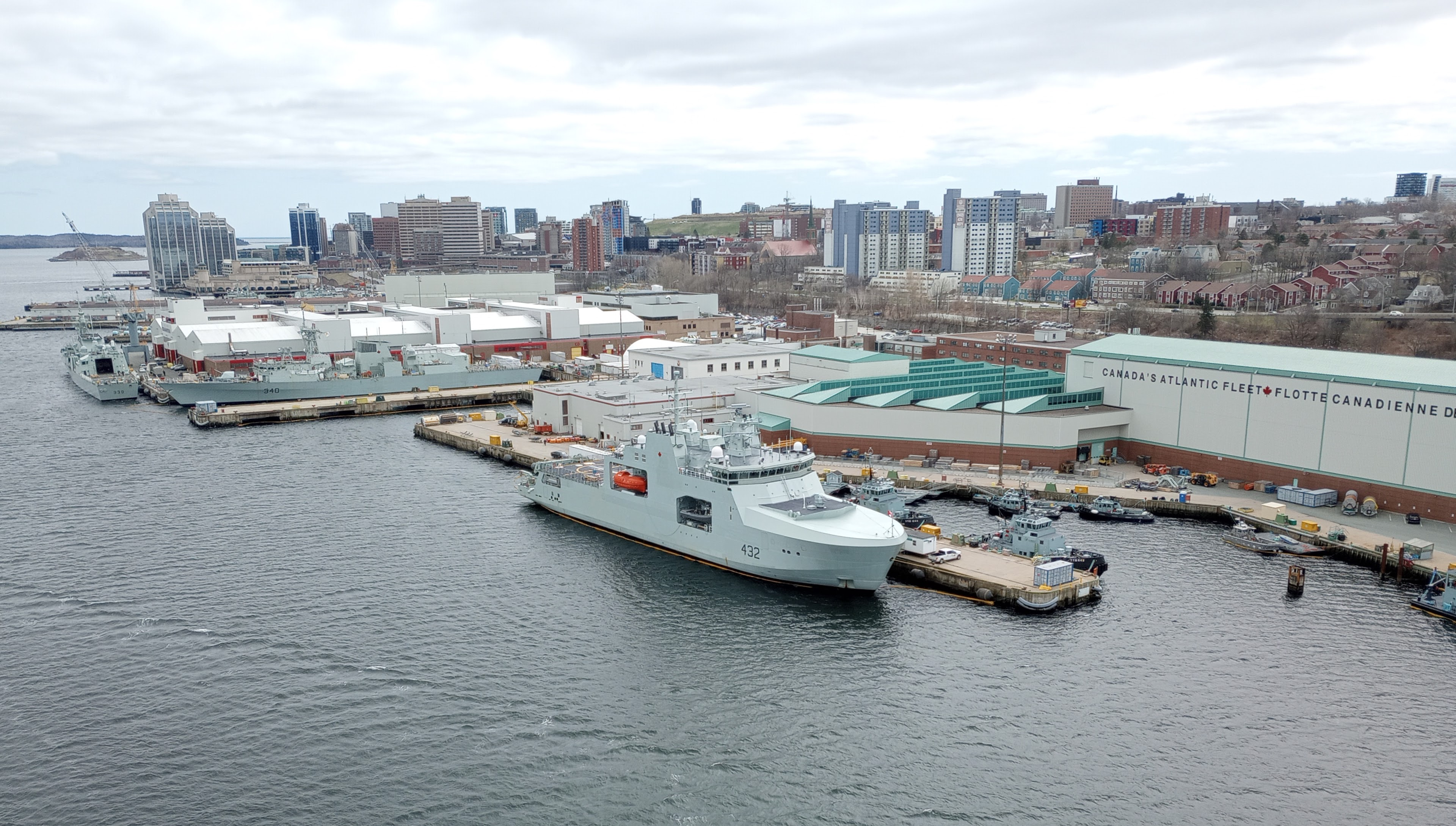
RCN ships docked at CFB Halifax, 2023

Maritime Forces Atlantic comprises the RCN's naval units on Canada's Atlantic coast. Its units include Canadian Fleet Atlantic, CFB Halifax, Maritime Forces Atlantic Headquarters, Fleet Maintenance Facility Cape Scott, and CFS St. John's. Maritime Forces Atlantic Headquarters and Fleet Maintenance Facility Cape Scott are situated within the eastern portion of CFB Halifax, His Majesty's Canadian Dockyard, Halifax, while the latter station is located in St. John's, Newfoundland and Labrador.

Maritime Forces Atlantic Headquarters serves as the formation's command centre and from where the formation commander gives direction to subordinate units. The command team for Maritime Forces Atlantic includes the commander of Joint Task Force Atlantic, the Maritime Forces Atlantic Chief Petty Officer, the commander of the Canadian Fleet Atlantic and the base commander of CFB Halifax.

Canadian Fleet Atlantic is made up of 15 commissioned warships, including seven Halifax-class frigates, four coastal defence vessels and two Victoria-class submarines. In addition to its ships, Canadian Fleet Atlantic also includes Fifth Maritime Operations Group, Sea Training Atlantic, and Fleet Diving Unit Atlantic. The formation employs more than 5,000 military and 2,000 civilian personnel.

=== Maritime Forces Pacific ===
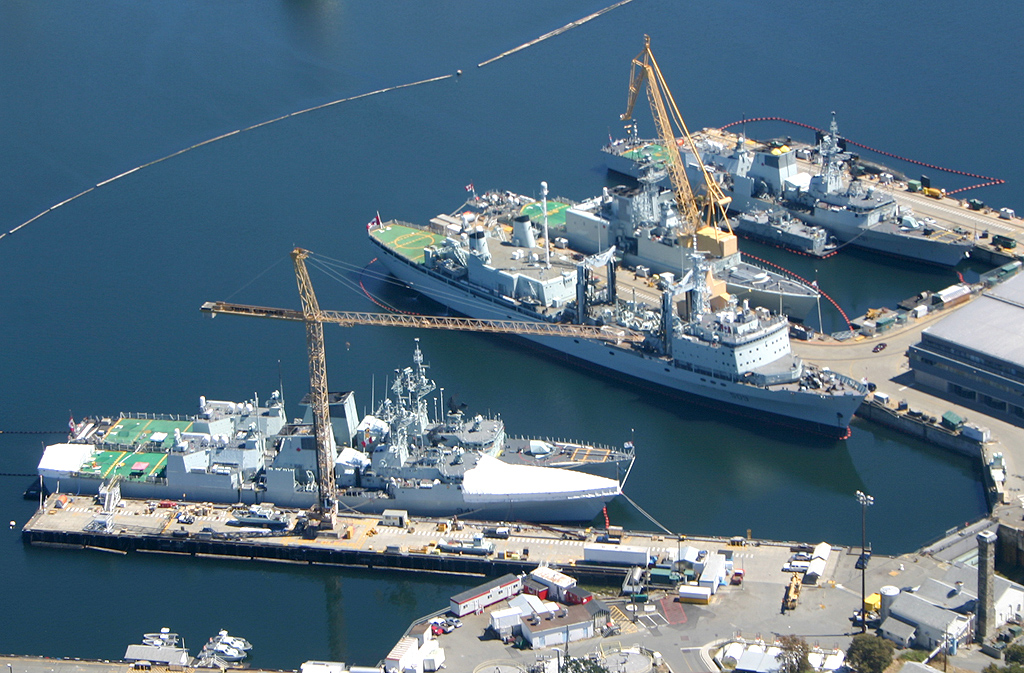
RCN ships docked at CFB Esquimalt, 2006

Maritime Forces Pacific comprises the RCN's naval forces and units on Canada's Pacific coast. The formation is based in Esquimalt, British Columbia, and employs roughly 4,000 military and 2,000 civilian personnel. Many of its units are based at CFB Esquimalt, the CAFs' second largest base, encompassing 4,900 hectares (12,000 acres) and 1,500 buildings.

Its units include Canadian Fleet Pacific, CFB Esquimalt, Fleet Maintenance Facility Cape Breton, Fleet Diving Unit Pacific, and Naval Training Development Centre (Pacific). Canadian Fleet Pacific includes 13 ships and two submarines. In addition to its ships, Maritime Forces Pacific also includes Fleet Headquarters, Coastal Division, Sea Training (Pacific), and the Naval Tender Section.

=== Naval Reserve ===
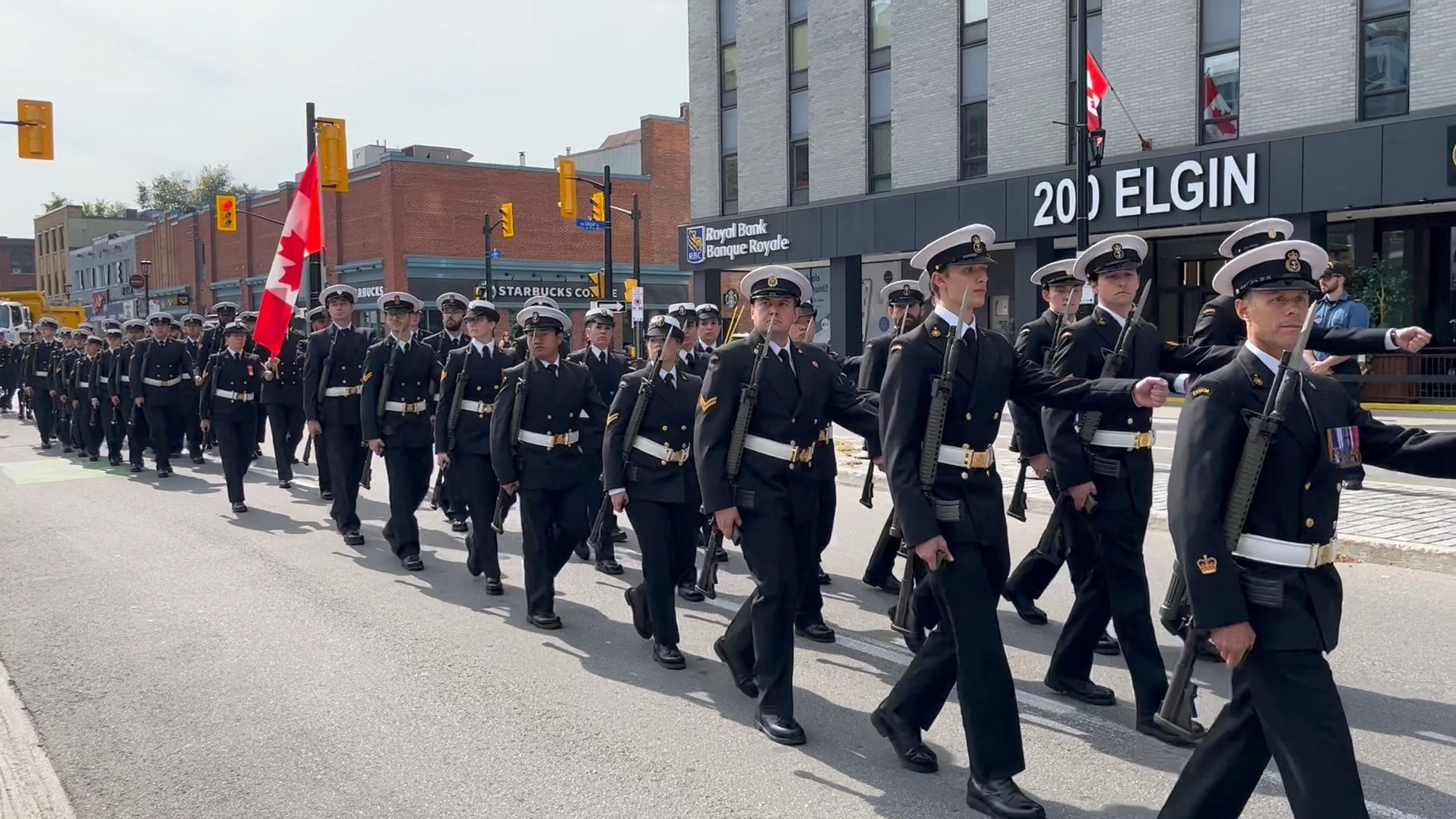
Naval reservists from HMCS Carleton NRD parade in Ottawa, 2023

The Naval Reserve's primary mission is to generate trained individuals that can respond to domestic safety operations with small boat expertise, provide specific unique skill sets required for RCN security missions, augment the RCN fleet's platforms and shore capacity for defence mission, and provide linkage between the RCN and local communities.

The formation includes the Naval Reserve Headquarters and 24 Naval Reserve divisions (NRD). The Naval Reserve Headquarters, located in Quebec City, coordinates the activities of the 24 NRDs spread across the country. Naval reservists typically parade at their local NRD one or two times per week to conduct training and maintain operational readiness. The majority of naval reservists serve on a part-time basis, though some serve full-time.

== Fleet ==
The Royal Canadian Navy operates a number of warships, patrol vessels, submarines and training vessels. In addition to its operational warships and auxiliary vessels, HMCS Haida, a former World War II-era destroyer and museum ship moored in Hamilton, Ontario, is formally commissioned as the navy’s ceremonial flagship. (Note: Although the ship is commissioned as the RCN's "ceremonial flagship", HMCS Haida is maintained by Parks Canada as a National Historic Site of Canada and publlic museum ship.) However, internal reports from the Department of National Defence in 2024 reported that approximately 54 per cent of the RCN's equipment was unservicable, primarily due to manpower and funding shortfalls.

RCN ships may carry aircraft and specialized crews, including Advanced Naval Capability (ANC) units and clearance divers. ANC personnel and its maritime tactical operators, are used for maritime interdiction operations, harbour defence and force protection. Clearance divers are specialists responsible for mine countermeasures diving, maritime explosive ordnance disposal, improvised explosive device disposal, and underwater engineering support. They are based in CFB Esquimalt and CFB Halifax, and with additional detachments in Toronto and within Canadian Special Operations Forces Command.

=== Surface fleet ===
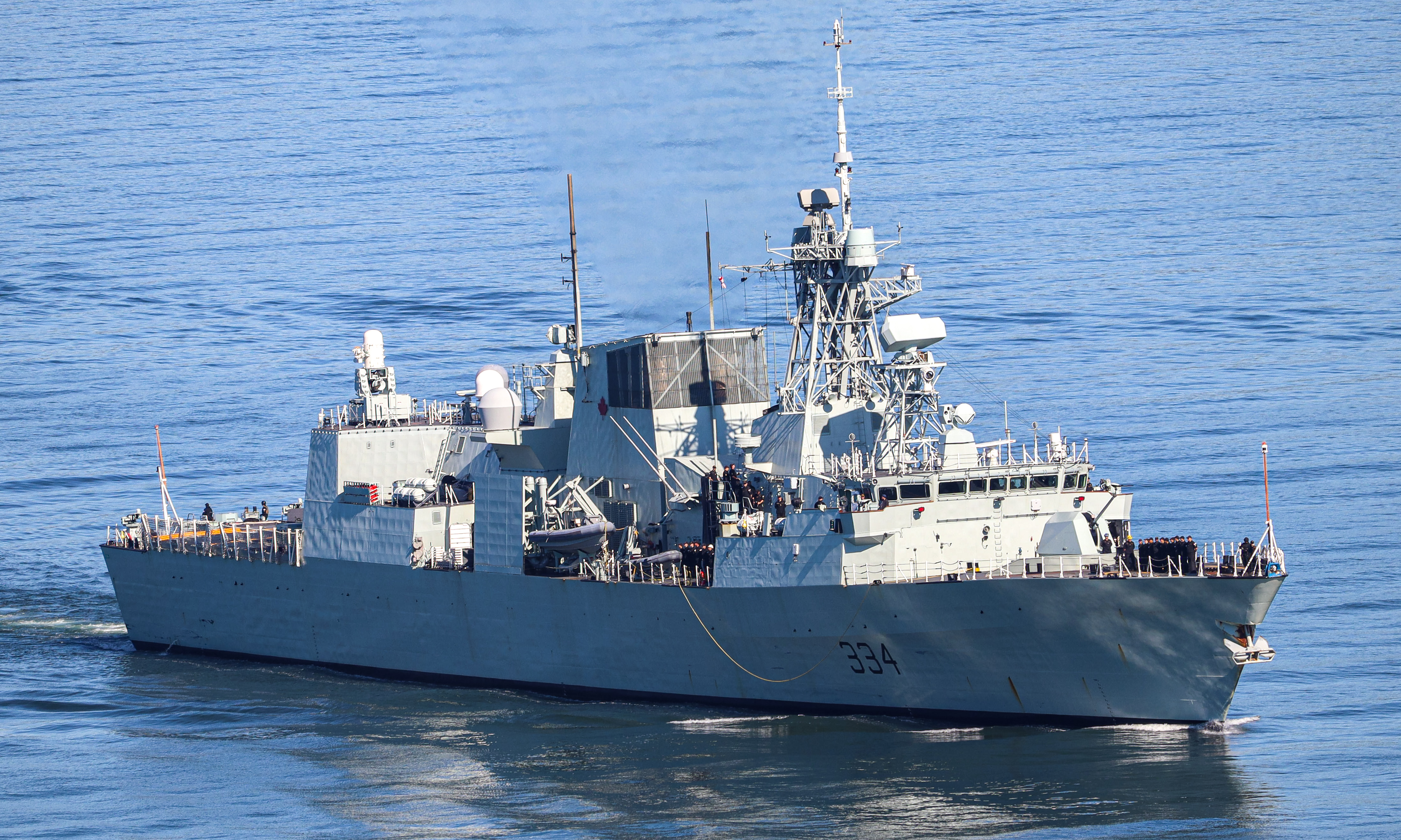
HMCS Regina, a Halifax-class frigate, in Burrard Inlet, 2025

The surface fleet includes several classes of armed vessels. This includes 12 Halifax-class frigates, which forms the backbone of the surface fleet. The frigates are used in a wide range of missions, including peacekeeping support, humanitarian assistance, disaster relief operations, and combat operations. The first in its class entered service in 1992, with the class receiving mid-life refits in the 2010s. The class is intended to be replaced by the River-class destroyer, a design selected in 2018 to replace both the Halifax class and the already retired Iroquois-class destroyers. As of 2025, up to 15 ships have been planned, with the first expected to enter service in the 2030s.

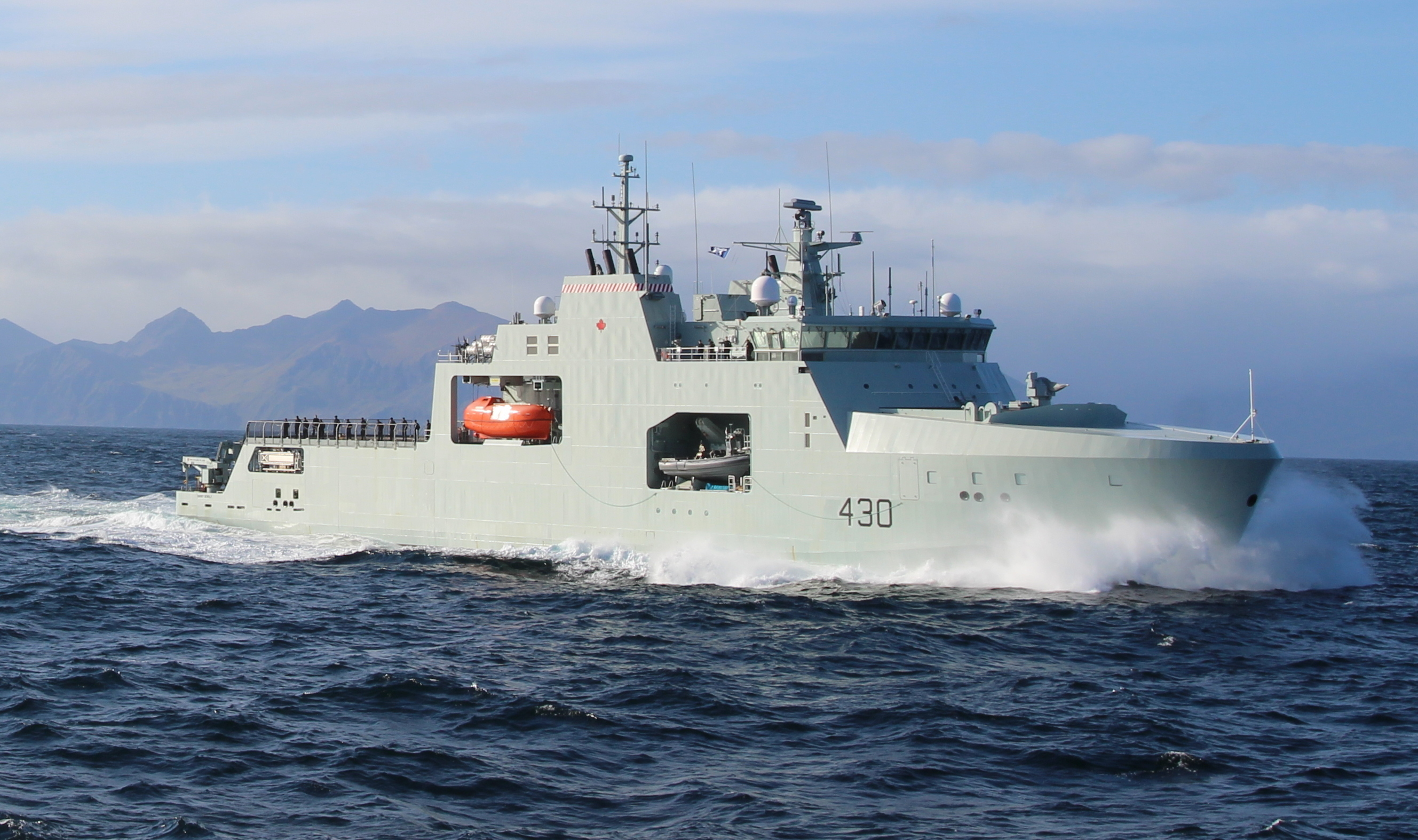
HMCS Harry DeWolf passes off the coast of Dutch Harbor in the Bering Sea, 2021

The RCN also operate five Harry DeWolf-class offshore patrol vessels, a class of Arctic and offshore patrol vessels designed to patrol Canadian Arctic and coastal waters and support international operations, including surveillance, search and rescue, humanitarian assistance, emergency response, and disaster relief. The first Harry DeWolf-class ship entered service in 2021. A sixth ship was delivered, although it is not yet in service.

Four Kingston-class coastal defence vessels remain in service with the RCN. The Kingston class are multi-role minor warships used primarily for coastal surveillance, patrol operations, search and rescue, law enforcement support, resource protection, fisheries patrols and training. Entering service in 1996, there were initially 12 Kingston-class vessels in service, although the class has been gradually paid off and retired. The Continental Defence Corvette is an RCN project to replace the retiring Kingston class, although a contract to build the class has not yet been awarded.

The RCN also acquired CSS Asterix in 2015 as a stopgap to provide replenishment capability from the retirement of the Protecteur-class replenishment oilers to the introduction of its replacement, the Protecteur-class auxiliary vessels. In addition to replenishment, the Protecteur-class auxiliary vessel will also provide limited sealift capacity and support for naval operations ashore. The design was selected in 2014, with construction beginning for the first of two ships in 2020.

=== Submarines ===
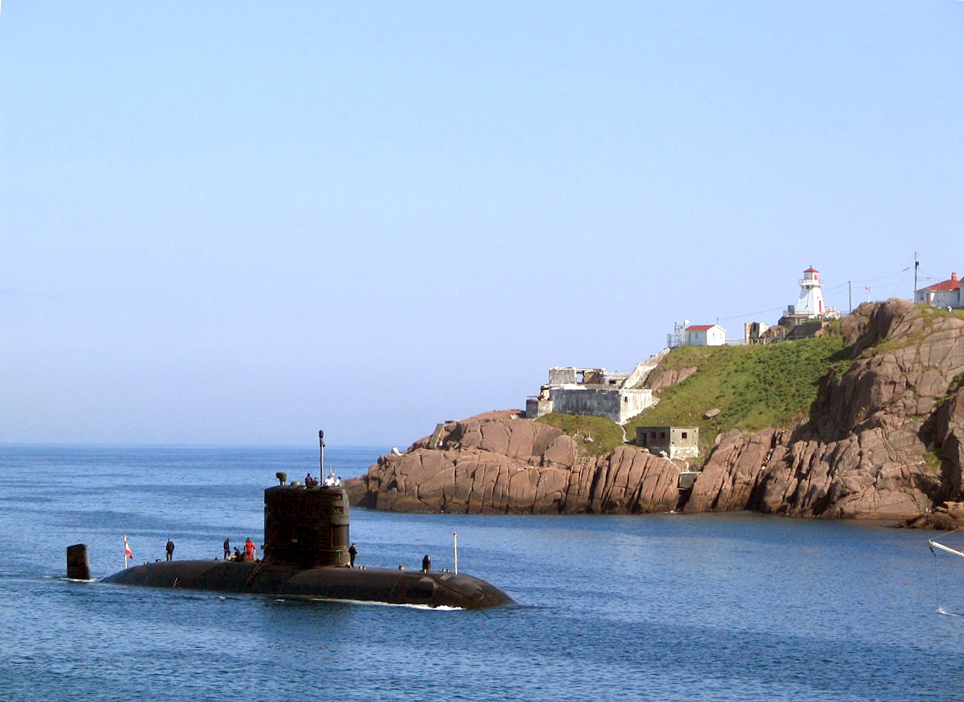
HMCS Corner Brook entering St. John's Harbour, 2006

The RCN operates four Victoria-class submarines: HMCS Victoria, Corner Brook, Windsor, and Chicoutimi. The submarines are used to support the RCN's maritime and defence capabilities, using them for surveillance, intelligence gathering, maritime security operations and law enforcement, counter-narcotics and anti-smuggling operations, environmental monitoring, and Arctic and continental defence missions. They also provide combat capabilities in support of naval operations.

The four Victoria-class submarines first entered service with the Royal Navy in the 1990s. The submarines were later acquired by Canada, with the first entering RCN service in 2000. In 2024, the Canadian Patrol Submarine Project (CPSP) was announced to replace the Victoria class, with up to 12 submarines to be acquired by the RCN. In 2026, the RCN announced the future procurement of 12 Thyssenkrupp Marine Systems (TKMS) Type 212CD submarines to replace the Victoria class. The first four are scheduled to be in service by 2034.

=== Training and auxiliary ships ===
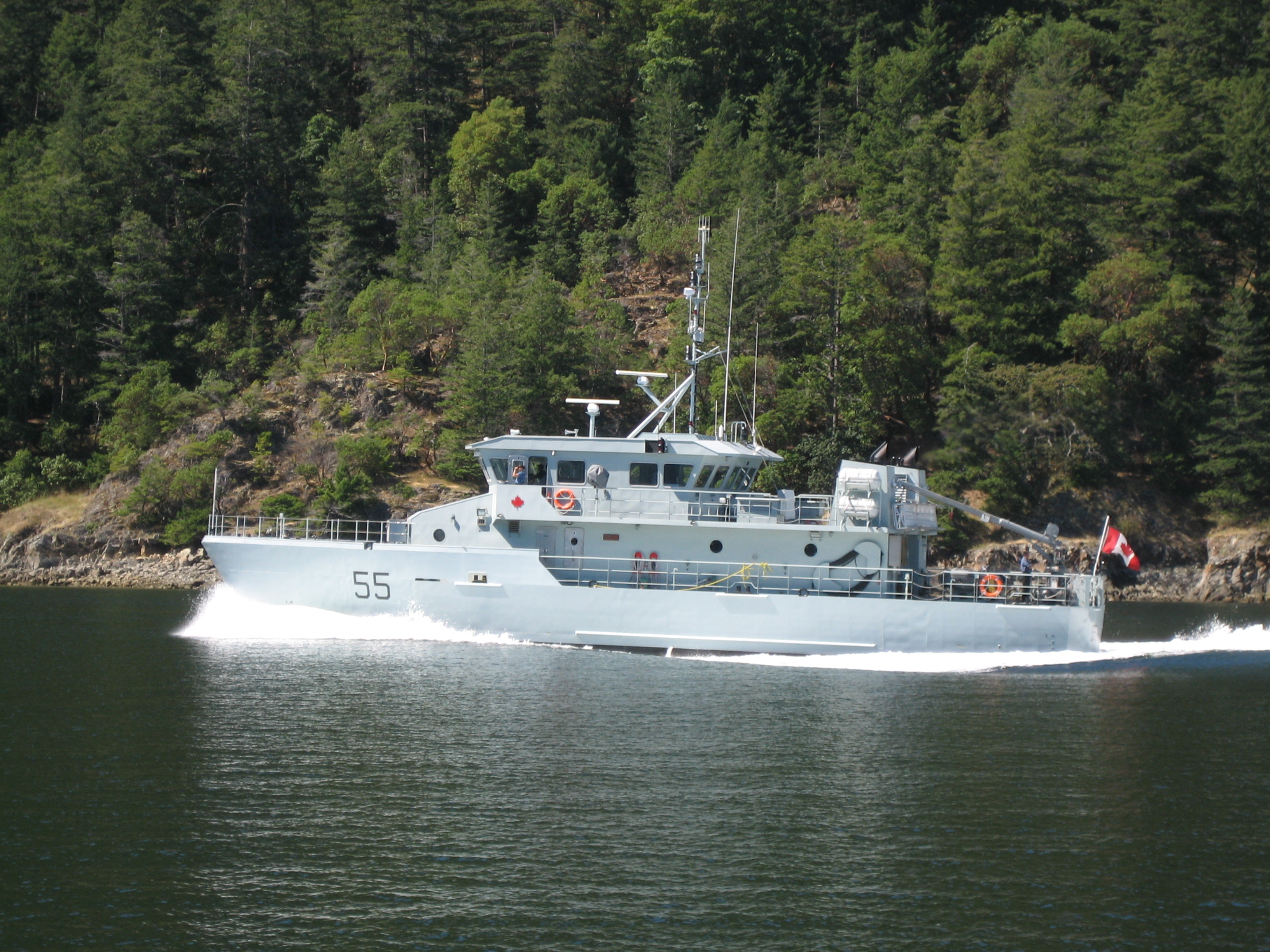
An Orca-class patrol vessel in the Gulf Islands, 2007

The RCN operates nine training vessels to support the training and provide at-sea experience, HMCS Oriole, a tall ship, and eight Orca-class patrol vessels. All Orca-class vessels are based in British Columbian coastal waters and are used primarily as training ships. In addition to their training role, the vessels support community relations by participating in local events. Although they are not assigned a dedicated operational role, Orca-class patrol vessels do also conduct coastal patrols and report suspicious activity, pollution infractions, and fishing violations. They are also tasked with search and rescue operations and assisting vessels in distress.

The RCN has five Glen-class tugs and one Fire-class fireboats, which are typically crewed by civilian personnel. These vessels operate from CFB Esquimalt and CFB Halifax. The RCN plans to replace the five tugs and two fireboats with six Naval Large Tugboats.

=== Aircraft ===
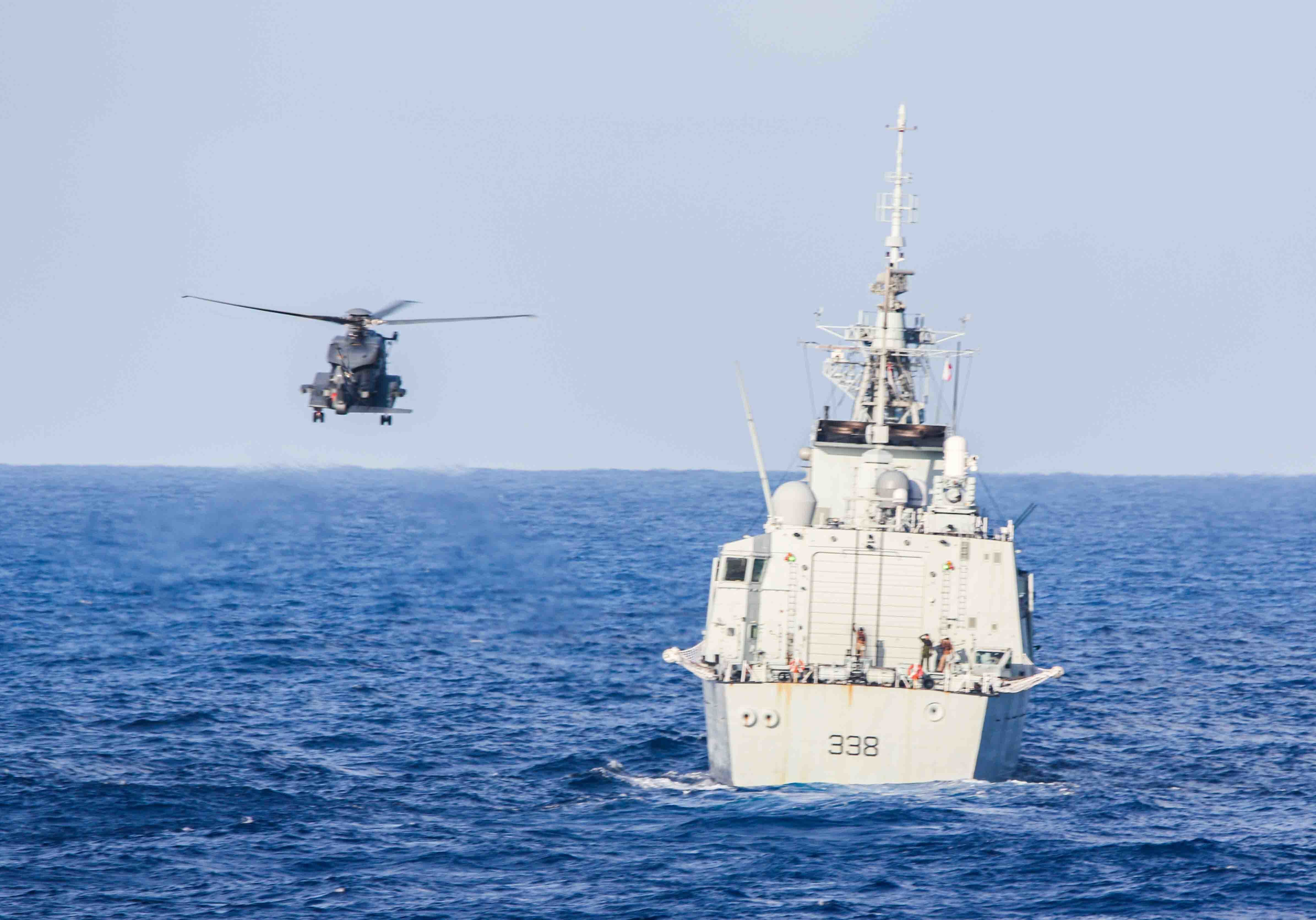
An RCAF CH-148 Cyclone prepares to land aboard HMCS Winnipeg, 2022

Since 1975, all manned aircraft supporting the RCN have been operated by the Royal Canadian Air Force. This includes CH-148 Cyclone helicopters embarked aboard RCN ships for anti-submarine warfare, surveillance, and search and rescue operations.

From 1914 to 1945, Canadian naval aviators generally served with the Royal Navy. The RCN briefly established the Royal Canadian Naval Air Service in 1918, though it was disbanded within months. In 1945, the RCN formed the Naval Air Branch, which was later reorganized into Maritime Air Group in 1968. Maritime Air Group operated carrier-borne aircraft until 1970 and anti-submarine warfare aircraft from destroyers and shore bases until 1975, when Air Command assumed control over Maritime Air Group and its aircraft.

RCN personnel, typically from ANC units, do operate shipborne unmanned aerial vehicles. These UAVs are used to enhance shipborne intelligence, surveillance, target acquisition, and reconnaissance, extending the sensor range of RCN ships and providing over-the-horizon situational awareness. UAVs acquired by the RCN for this use include AeroVironment RQ-20 Puma and CU-176 Gargoyle (already withdrawn from use). The RCN are also procuring Schiebel Camcopter S-100, which are to enter operational service in 2027 as CU-179 Peregrine.

== Personnel ==
As of 2026, the Royal Canadian Navy reports having 8,400 Regular Force sailors and 4,100 Reserve Force sailors, in addition to employing approximately 3,800 civilian staff. However, in January 2026, the RCN was reported to be approximately 2,000 sailors short of its then-Regular Force target of 7,700 personnel.

=== Rank and insignia ===
Military ranks in the RCN denote an individual's position within the command's hierarchy. Advancement through the ranks corresponds to increased responsibility and authority. The rank structure is used to facilitate the transmission of orders during operations, ensure clarity of command, and maintain discipline and order.

==== Commander-in-Chief ====
Board

Sleeve

Commander-in-Chief board and sleeve used by the governor general of Canada when wearing a navy uniform.

In their capacity as the Commander-in-Chief of Canada, the governor general of Canada is entitled to wear a distinctive general officer uniform from any of three environments: navy, army, or air force. The navy uniform features a unique general sleeve braid embellished with the governor general's badge. The badge is also embroidered on the uniform's shoulder straps.

==== Commissioned officers ====
Officers hold positions of command and responsibility. Their roles typically include overseeing personnel, planning, and directing operations, making decisions within their scope of authority, and providing advice to achieve operational objectives.

RCN officers are commissioned through multiple entry plans, each tailored for officer candidates with different educational backgrounds and military experience, to develop them to the proficiency expected of an officer. This typically includes providing pathways to complete an academic degree, either through a Canadian military college or another Canadian university. Other pathways include the Direct Entry Officer Plan for candidates who already possess an academic degree, and the Continuing Education Officer Training Plan for select candidates who are otherwise qualified for service as officers but lack an academic degree. There are also several entry plans to facilitate the transition of non-commissioned members.

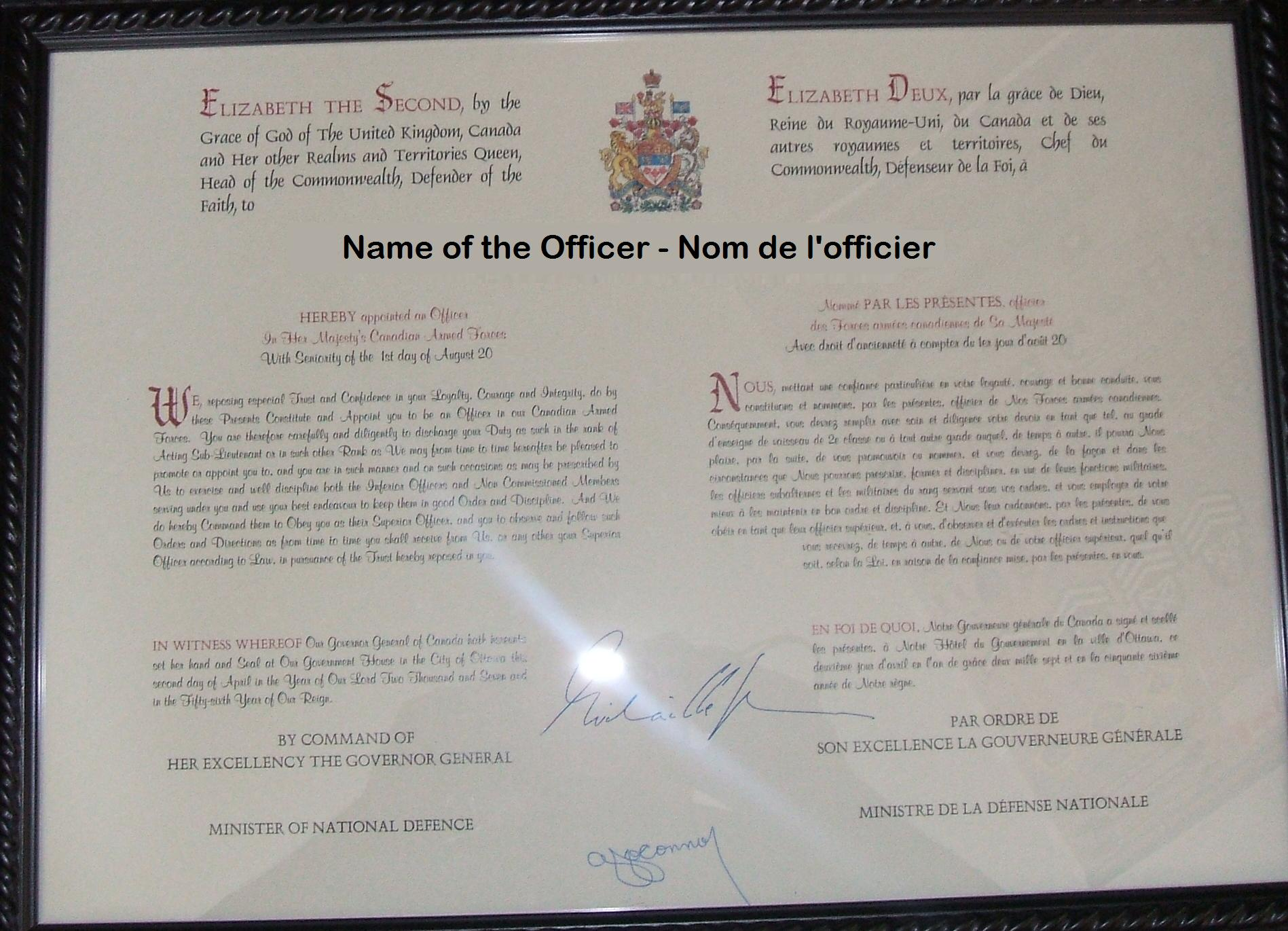
A naval officer's commission scroll with the Canadian Armed Forces

Candidates seeking entry as an officer in the CAF are required to pass Basic Military Officer Qualification at Canadian Forces Leadership and Recruit School in Saint-Jean-sur-Richelieu.

The rank insignia worn on the shoulder straps of RCN general officers, like those of other Canadian Armed Forces general and flag officers, features maple leaves, the number of which corresponds to the officer's rank. The rank insignia for senior and junior officers is made up of gold laces, with the number and spacing of the laces varying by rank, and an executive curl surmounting the lace. The rank insignia for subordinate officers is made up of only a singular gold lace.

NATO code	OF-10	OF-9	OF-8	OF-7	OF-6	OF-5	OF-4	OF-3	OF-2	OF-1
Royal Canadian Navy
Royal Canadian Navy		Admiral	Vice-admiral	Rear-admiral	Commodore	Captain (N)	Commander	Lieutenant-commander	Lieutenant (N)	Sub-lieutenant	Acting sub-lieutenant
Royal Canadian Navy		Amiral(e)	Vice-amiral(e)	Contre-amiral(e)	Commodore	Capitaine de vaisseau	Capitaine de frégate	Capitaine de corvette	Lieutenant(e) de vaisseau	Enseigne de vaisseau de 1^{re} classe	Enseigne de vaisseau de 2^{e} classe

==== Non-commissioned members ====
Non-commissioned members in the RCN perform operational and support duties and contribute to maintaining safety, discipline, and the welfare of their units. Non-commissioned members of the RCN typically enter the service through Basic Military Qualification (BMQ) at Canadian Forces Leadership and Recruit School, followed by naval environmental and occupation-specific training for their chosen trade. In addition to the standard entry pathway, the RCN also operates the Naval Experience Program, an alternative introductory program that allows recruits to complete basic military and naval familiarization training while exploring naval life and occupations before committing to a specific trade.

In August 2020, the RCN replaced the term seaman in its non-commissioned member rank titles with the gender-neutral term sailor as part of a broader modernization of rank designations.

NATO code	OR-9	OR-8	OR-7	OR-6	OR-5	OR-4	OR-3	OR-2	OR-1
Royal Canadian Navy									No insignia
Royal Canadian Navy	Chief petty officer 1st class	Chief petty officer 2nd class	Petty officer 1st class	Petty officer 2nd class		Master sailor	Sailor 1st class	Sailor 2nd class	Sailor 3rd class
Royal Canadian Navy	Premier(ère) maître de 1^{re} classe	Premier(ère) maître de 2^{e} classe	Maître de 1^{re} classe	Maître de 2^{e} classe		Matelot-chef	Matelot de 1^{re} classe	Matelot de 2^{e} classe	Matelot de 3^{e} classe

=== Uniforms ===
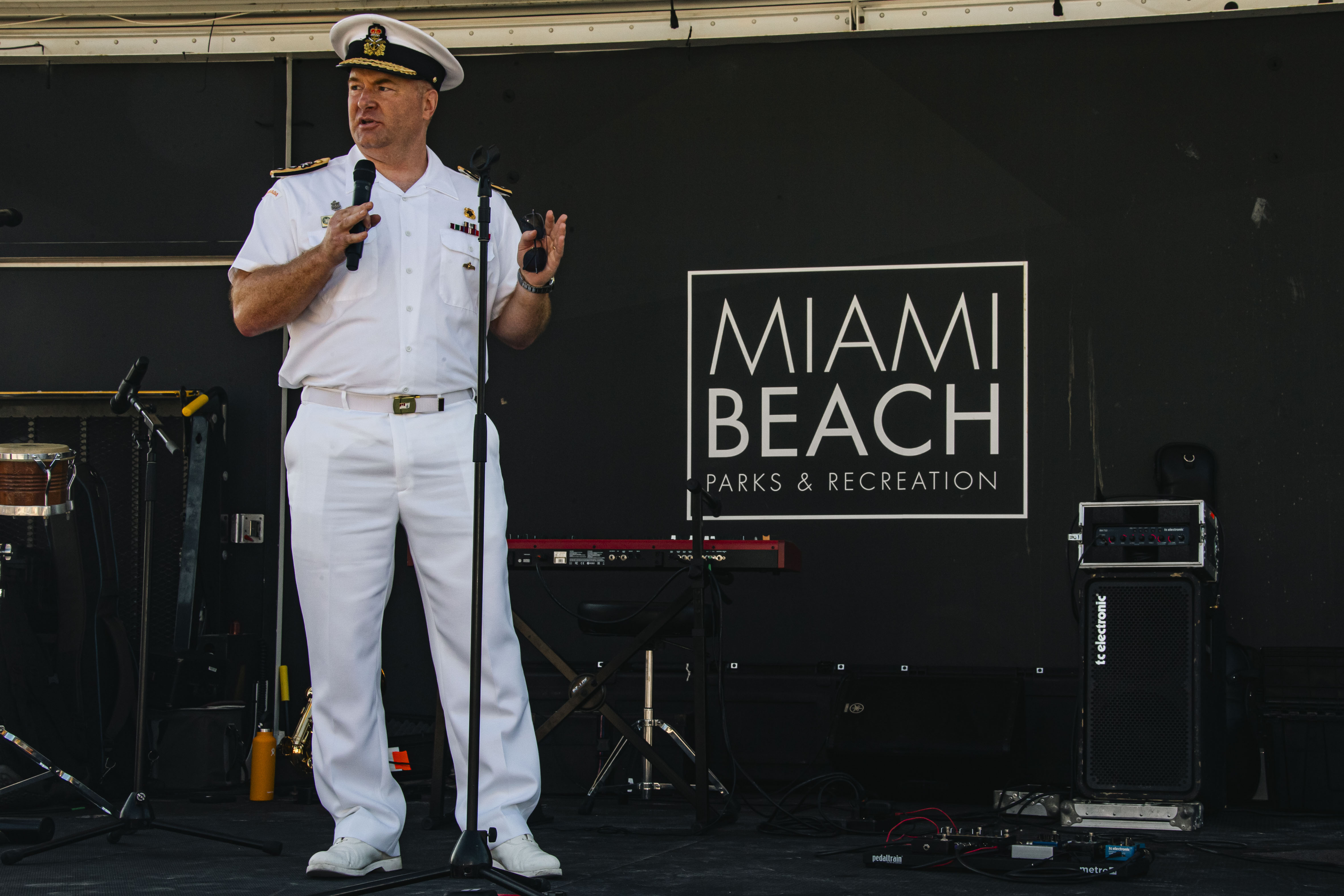
An RCN admiral wearing a short-sleeved white-coloured "summer" service dress uniform, 2024

All CAF uniforms, including the RCN, are categorized into five types, including No. 1 Dress (ceremonial dress), No. 2 Dress (mess dress), No. 3 Dress (service dress), No. 4 Dress (occupational dress), and No. 5 Dress (operational dress). Each category contains several orders that specify variations for particular occasions. Uniforms worn by the RCN are regulated by the Dress Instructions for the Canadian Forces. Misuse of the likeness of RCN's uniforms is an offence under Article 419 of the Criminal Code of Canada and is punishable by summary conviction.

==== Daily duty and operational ====
The RCN's No. 3 service dress is a navy blue (a tone of black) uniform used for routine and formal duties. The naval pattern includes service-dress double-breasted jacket and trousers. Neckties are worn by officers with service dress. The No. 3B order for summer wear consists of a short-sleeved, tieless configuration with option of navy blue or white trousers. Service dress may be worn with authorized ribbons, flying and specialist skill badges, and occupation badges. Depending on the order of dress, season and circumstances, personnel may wear different authorized footwear, headdress and outerwear, including the service dress cap, topcoat, raincoat and parka.

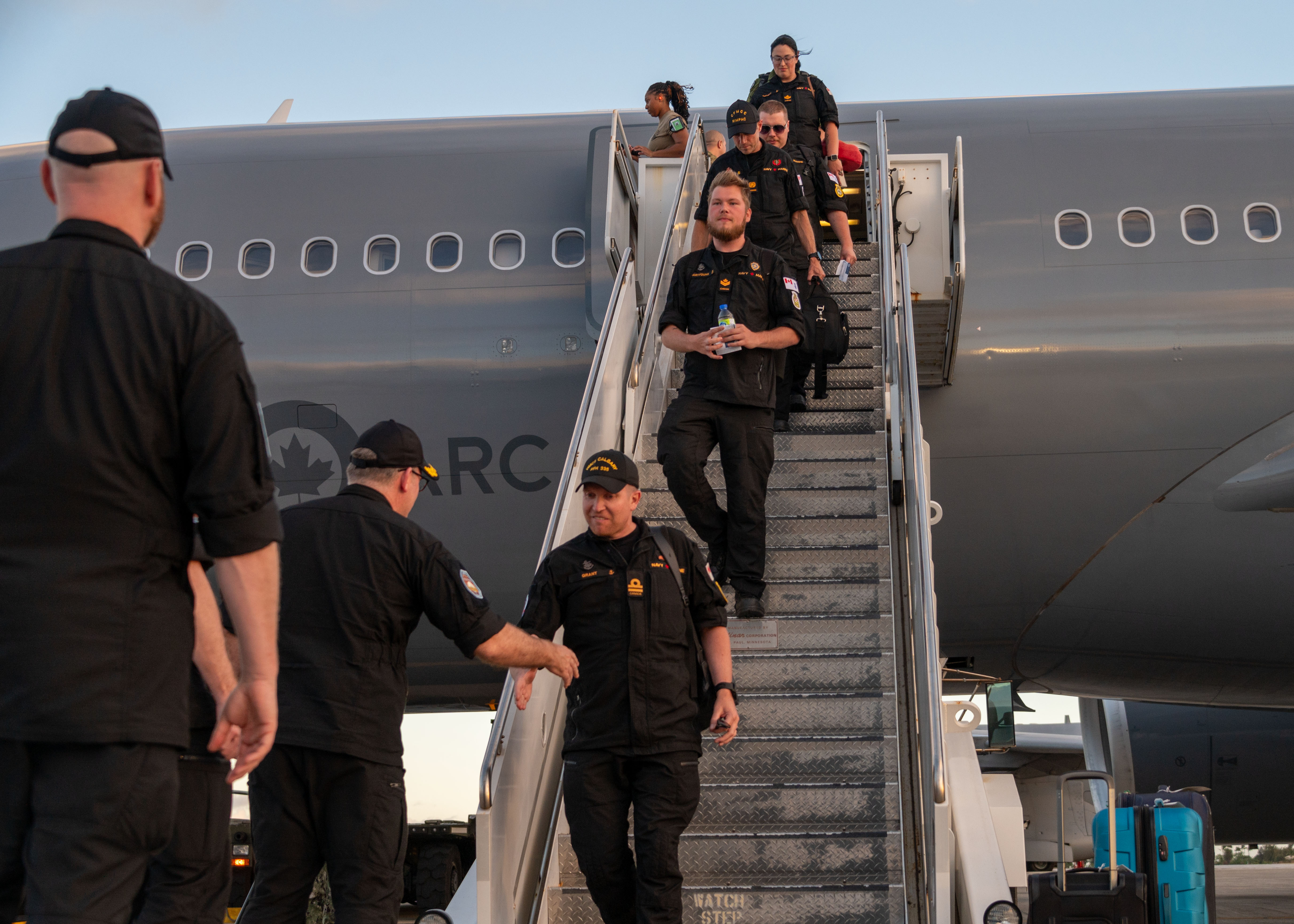
RCN sailors wearing Naval Enhanced Combat Uniforms, a type of operational dress, 2024.

The RCN's operational dress includes uniforms worn during operations, operational training, or as directed. These can range from naval enhanced combat uniform to field combat clothing featuring CADPAT digital camouflage to aviation dress. Operational uniforms are used across the entire CAF and are not specific to any single environmental command.

==== Formal ====
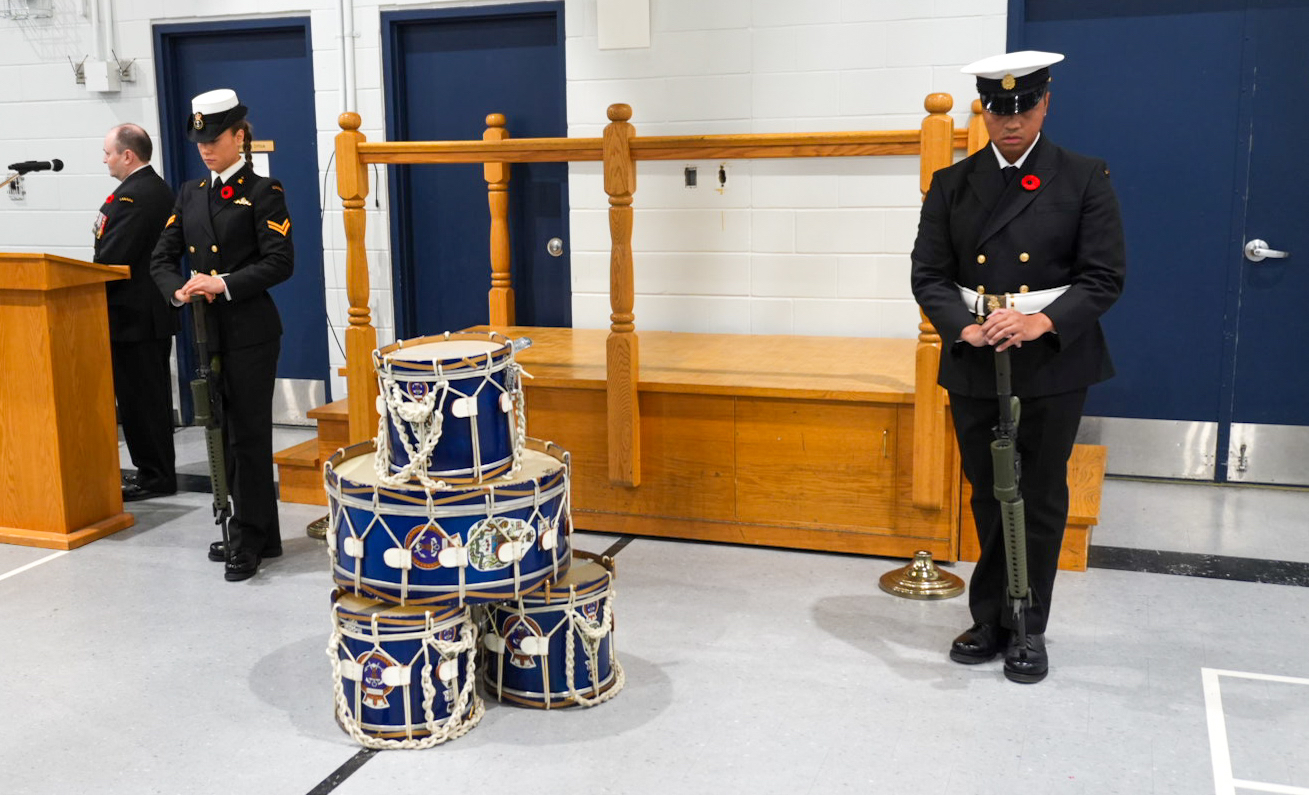
RCN personnel in ceremonial dress wearing remembrance poppies in rest on your arms reversed position

RCN personnel generally wear an appropriate order of naval service dress with authorized medals and accoutrements for formal ceremonies. The CAF's Dress Instructions maintain a No. 1B naval full dress, consisting of a navy-blue tunic and matching trousers, with white facings and worn with the appropriate naval insignia, rank and accoutrements. However, full-dress is no longer worn by the RCN.

The RCN's No. 2 mess dress includes a dark navy-blue mess jacket, worn with matching trousers or an optional skirt. Officers' jackets feature rank insignia and gold lace embellishment, while others wear the appropriate naval rank and trade insignia. A white shirt and black bow tie are worn with the uniform, along with black footwear and, where prescribed, white gloves. A cummerbund or waistcoat may be worn according to the applicable order of dress. A white version, designated No. 2A mess dress, is authorized for certain occasions and periods, while No. 2C is the mess dress variant intended for shipboard use. White high-collar jackets are also authorized for the No. 1C and 1D naval orders of dress.

== Symbols ==
RCN personnel wearing patches featuring HMCS Discovery's badge ("disc over Y") and the Canadian Naval Ensign, 2026

=== Badge ===
The Royal Canadian Navy and its formations are assigned badges as distinctive symbols to facilitate visual identification and foster pride and continuity. In addition to the Navy's command and maritime operations groups, individual ships in service, and support units also have their own badges.

==== Royal Canadian Navy badge ====
The first badge of the RCN was approved on 31 March 1944. The original design included nine maple leaves, representing the then nine provinces of Canada, and a Tudor Crown. After Newfoundland joined Canada in 1949, an updated design was approved on 17 July 1952, which had ten maple leaves. On 26 March 1956, St. Edward's Crown replaced the Tudor Crown. This badge remained in use until the unification of the CAF on 1 February 1968.

Following the reinstatement of the Royal Canadian Navy name in 2011, a new badge was approved in 2016, featuring St. Edward's Crown, a fouled anchor within a circlet, a compartment of maple leaves, and its motto at the bottom. In 2026, the Canadian Royal Crown replaced St Edward's Crown on the badge.

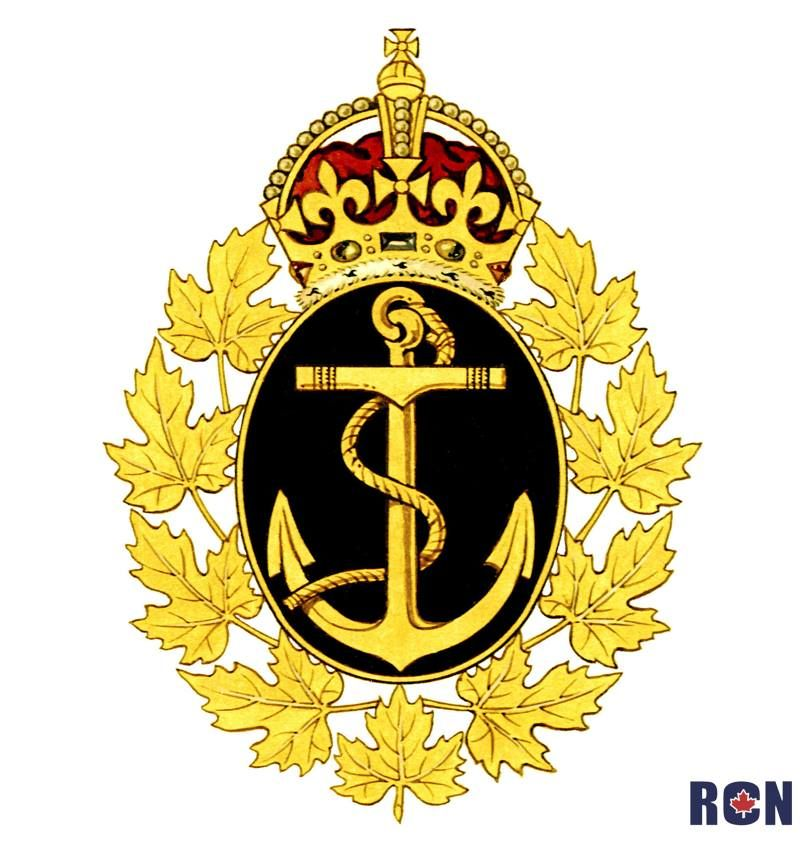
1944–1952

1968–2016

2016–2026

Past badges used by the RCN, with the years they were in used

When the Royal Canadian Navy became the Canadian Forces Maritime Command in 1968, the branch received a new badge. This badge included a flying eagle along with the anchor, representing the air arm of the navy. It also included a motto, "Ready Aye Ready".

=== Flags ===
The RCN uses a variety of flags, including those indicating Canadian nationality, such as the naval ensign and naval jack, as well as ceremonial flags reflecting naval tradition, including the King's Colours and a commissioning pennant.

==== Colours ====
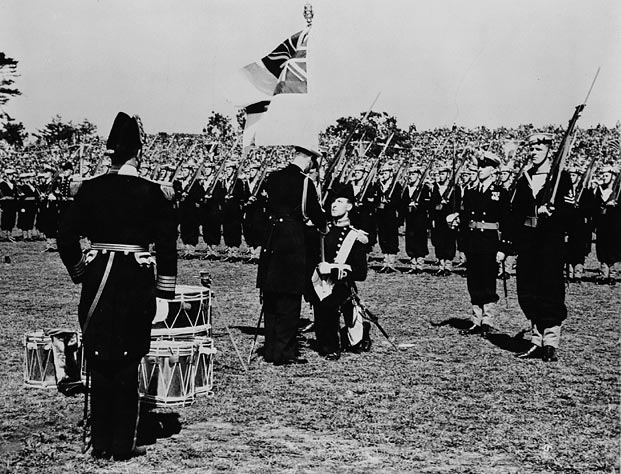
King George VI presenting the King's Colour to the RCN during his 1939 royal tour

The RCN was granted the right to use the King's Colour in 1925 by King George V. The Queen's or King's Colour (also referred to as the sovereign's colour) for the Navy has been consecrated and presented four times: in 1939 by King George VI in Esquimalt, in 1959 by Queen Elizabeth II in Halifax, in 1979 by Queen Elizabeth the Queen Mother in Halifax and in 2009 by the Governor General and Commander-in-Chief Michaëlle Jean in Halifax.

The colour used by the RCN between 1927 and 1936 was never actually presented but went straight into service in both the Atlantic and Pacific commands. Two identical colours were presented, one for the Atlantic fleet and one for the Pacific fleet, in 1926, 1939 and 1959, but only one colour was presented in 1979 and 2009. Th active 1979 and 2009 colour is maintained in RCN Headquarters in Ottawa and dispatched to ceremonies whenever it is needed. The RCN's retired colours are laid up at Beechwood Cemetery in Ottawa.

The Colour that is in use since 1979, showing the cypher of Elizabeth II

The current colours consist of a ceremonial standard with the Maple Leaf flag in the top left canton, Elizabeth II's personal Commonwealth cypher (a capital E on a blue background, surrounded by a circlet of gold roses and laurels, surmounted by a crown) and an anchor and naval crown (from the Canadian Naval Ensign) on the lower right fly. These elements are found in the 1979 and 2009 colours. The colours from 1926, 1939 and 1959 consist of a White Ensign with the Queen's or King's cypher, surrounded by the Garter and ensigned with the Crown, in the middle. With the Queen's death there will be eventually a new Colour when a subsequent monarch chooses to bestow one, but there is no regulation that causes the monarch's Colour to automatically change upon their death.

==== Commissioning pennant ====
RCN commissioning pennants are flown at a ship's masthead. Since the early 1990s, the RCN has used a commissioning pennant featuring a red maple leaf, replacing the original Saint George's Cross design shared with the Royal Navy. The pennant is hoisted on the date of the ship's commissioning and is only displaced by the Sovereign's Flag for Canada or the rank flag of another senior officer when embarked.

==== Ensigns and jacks ====
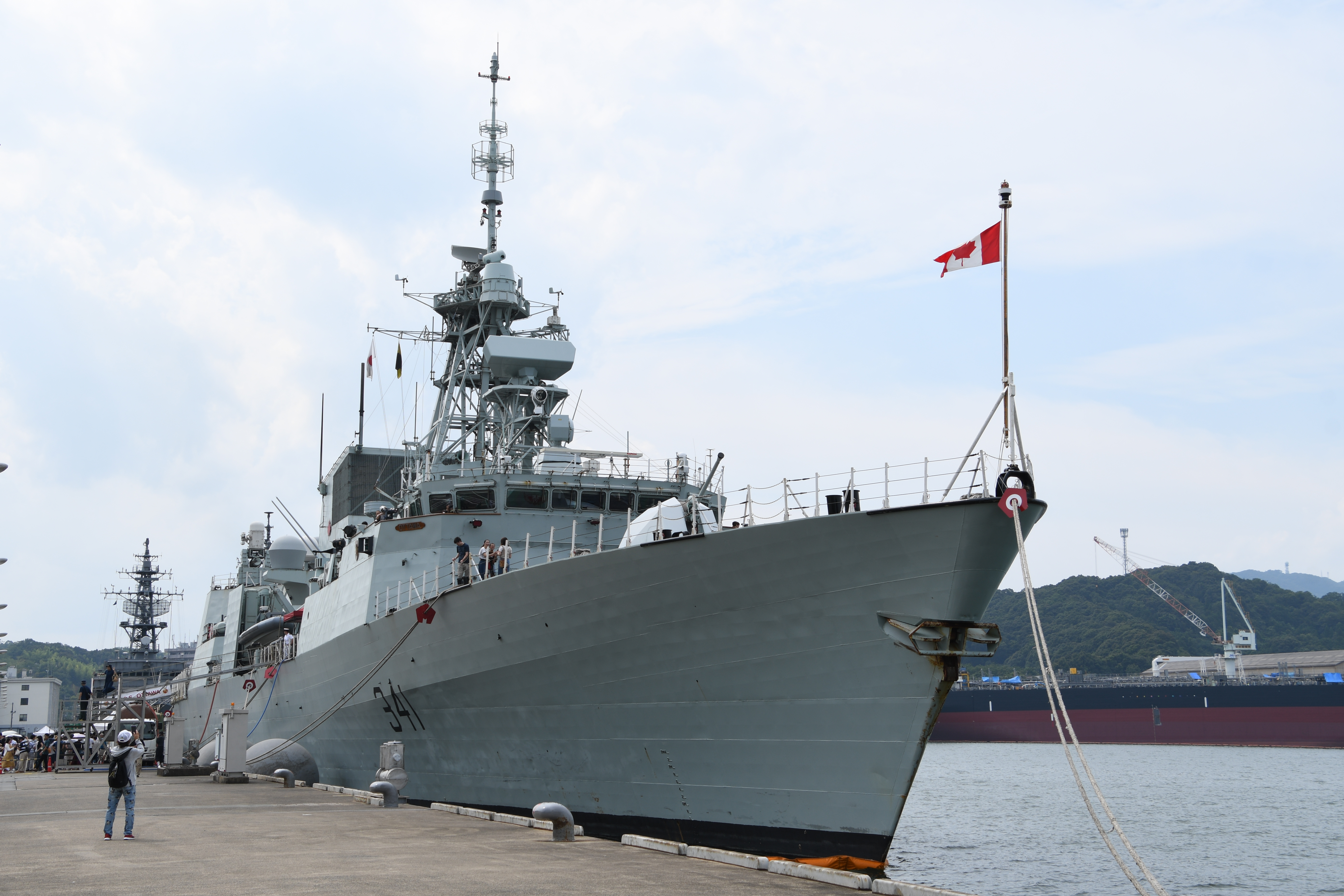
The RCN's naval jack, the flag of Canada, flown from the ship's bow

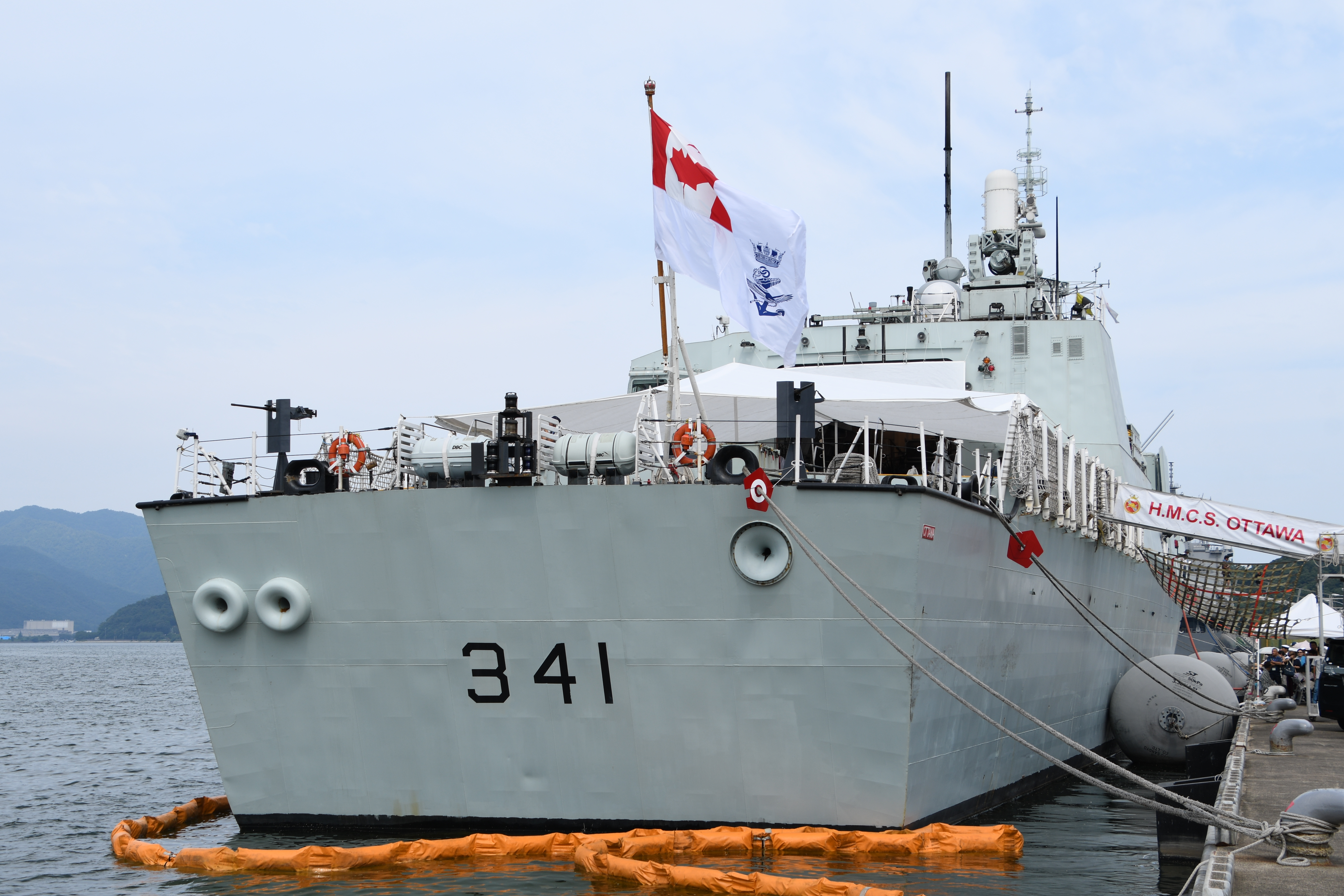
The Canadian Naval Ensign flown from the ship's stern

HMCS Ottawa moored, 2019

Naval jacks are flown at the ship's bow when alongside, moored or at anchor. The RCN has used the flag of Canada as its naval jack since 2013. The RCN initially used the Union Jack as its naval jack, before adopting the Canadian Blue Ensign in 1911, which remained in use until 1965. The flag of Canada served as the naval jack from 1965 to 1968, when it was replaced by a distinct Canadian naval jack. The 1968 design remained in use until 2013, when the flag of Canada was readopted as the naval jack, falling in line with naval practice in other Commonwealth countries. The 1968 design was repurposed as the Canadian Naval Ensign.

RCN naval ensigns are flown from the ships masthead while at sea, or at the stern when alongside, moored, or at anchor. The first naval ensign used by the RCN was the Canadian Blue Ensign in 1910, which was used to denote Canadian government vessels. From 1911 to 1965, the RCN flew the Royal Navy's White Ensign as its naval ensign. Following the adoption of the Maple Leaf flag as the national flag of Canada, the RCN adopted it as its naval ensign. The national flag served in this role until 2013, when the 1968 naval jack design was repurposed as a naval ensign.

=== Mascot ===
The RCN adopted an anthropomorphic military mascot in 2010 named SONAR, based on a Newfoundland dog as a part of the navy's centennial celebration. The name was selected through a youth contest inviting submissions for the mascot. Historically, some formations and individual ships kept live animals on board as companions, mascots and pets, a practice that continued even after the RCN formally prohibited pet animals aboard ships.

== Museums and memorials ==
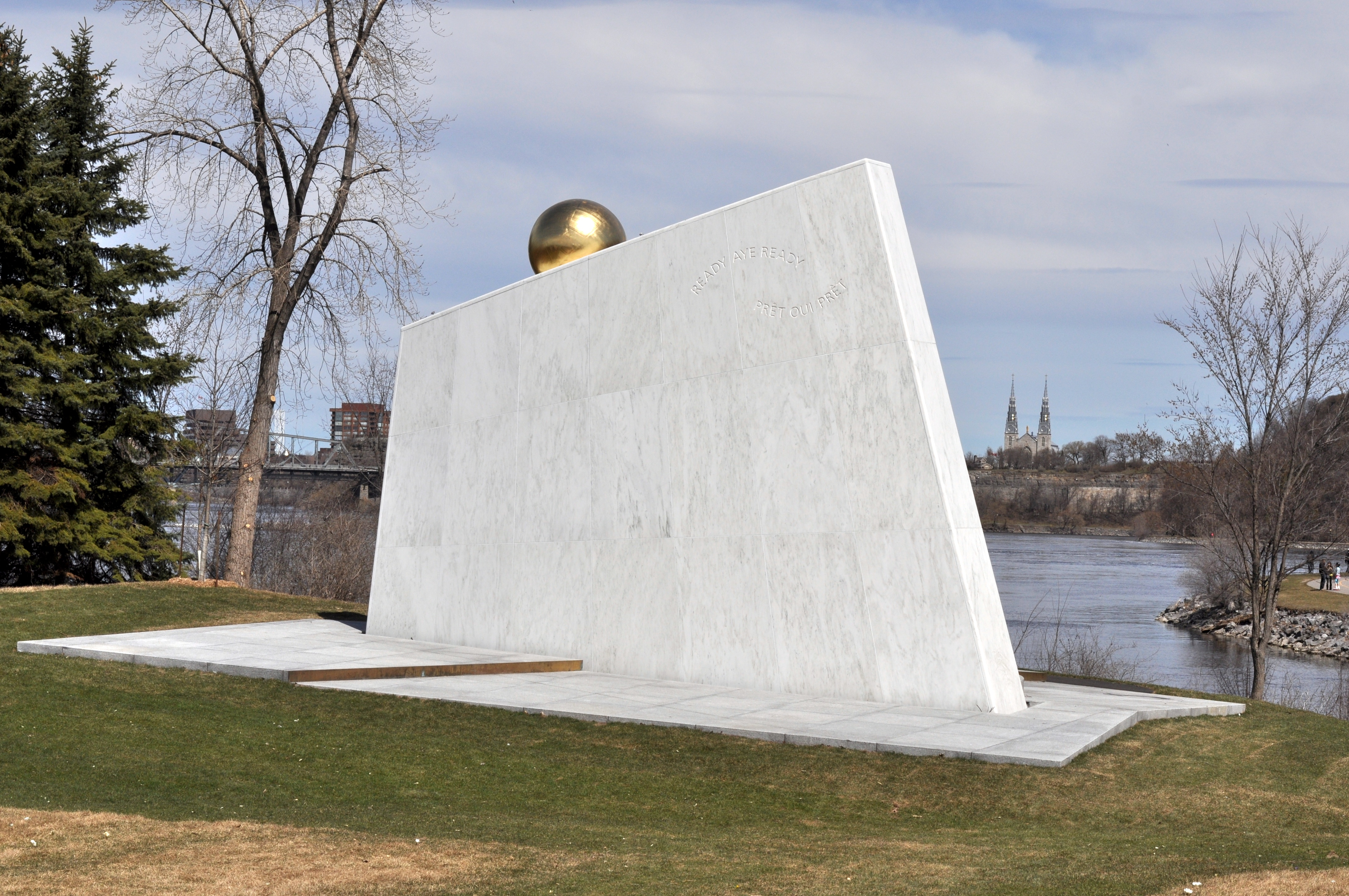
The Royal Canadian Navy Monument in Ottawa, 2012

The RCN maintains five naval museums to chronicle the history of the navy, CFB Esquimalt Naval and Military Museum, the Naval Museum of Halifax, the Naval Museum of Alberta, the Naval Museum of Manitoba, and the Naval Museum of Quebec. In addition to RCN-maintained museums, the navy's history is also preserved and interpreted by civilian institutions, including the Canadian War Museum, a national museum of Canada, the provincially operated Maritime Museum of the Atlantic in Nova Scotia, and the independent Maritime Museum of British Columbia. The navy's ceremonial flagship, HMCS Haida, is a museum ship.

Several public memorials have been erected to commemorate Canadian veterans and war dead. Most memorials commemorate Canadian veterans and war dead from all services, while others, like the Halifax Memorial, the Montreal Clock Tower, and the Naval Memorial Monument in Burlington, Ontario, commemorate sailors from both the RCN and the Canadian Merchant Navy. However, there are some monuments specifically dedicated to RCN sailors, like the Royal Canadian Navy Monument in Ottawa.

== See also ==
- Canadian Coast Guard
- Hull classification symbol (Canada)
- List of navies
- List of ships of the Royal Canadian Navy
- The North Atlantic Squadron (song)
