= Fireboat =

Firefighting vessel

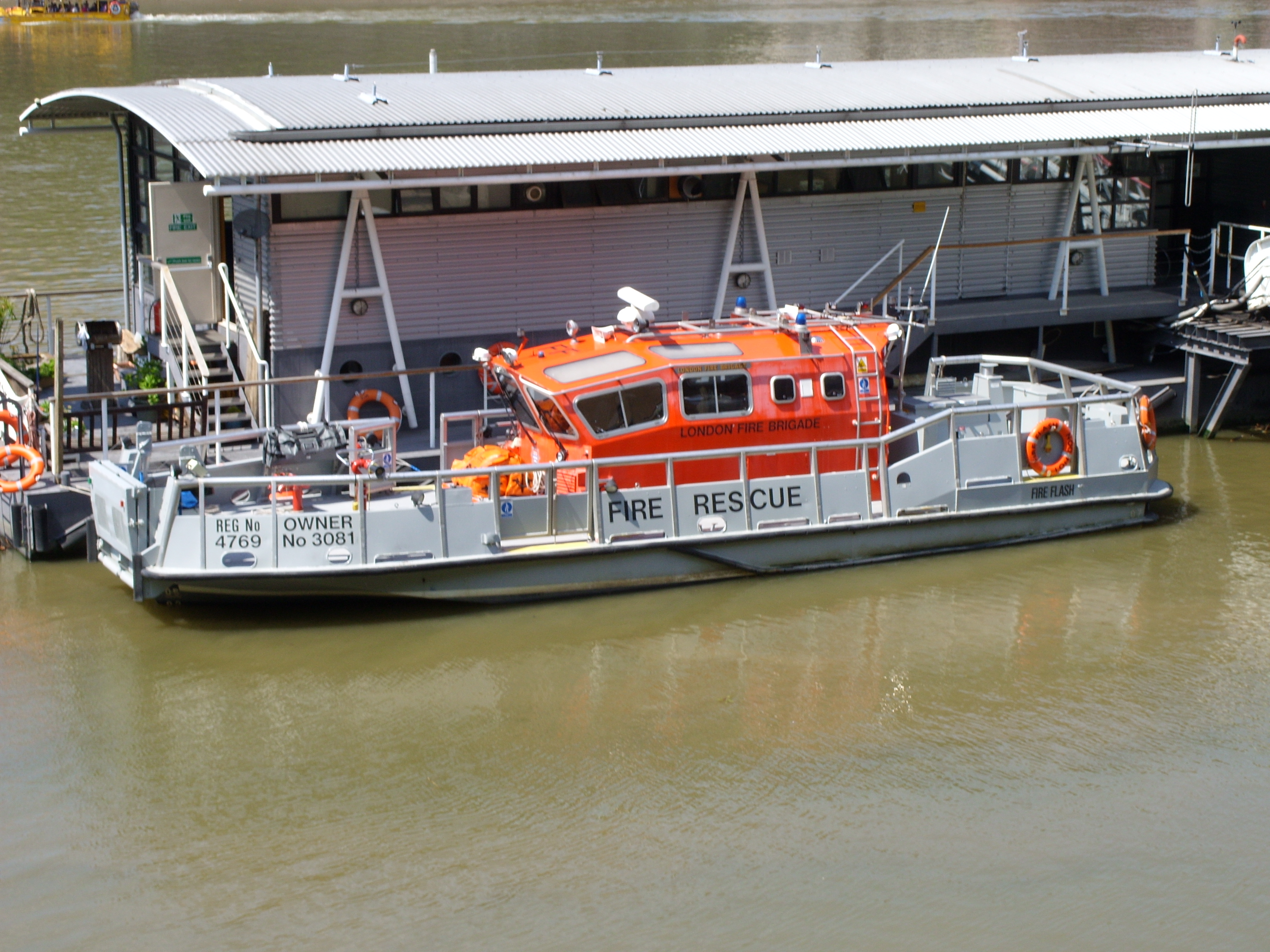
London Fire Brigade fireboat, River Thames, London

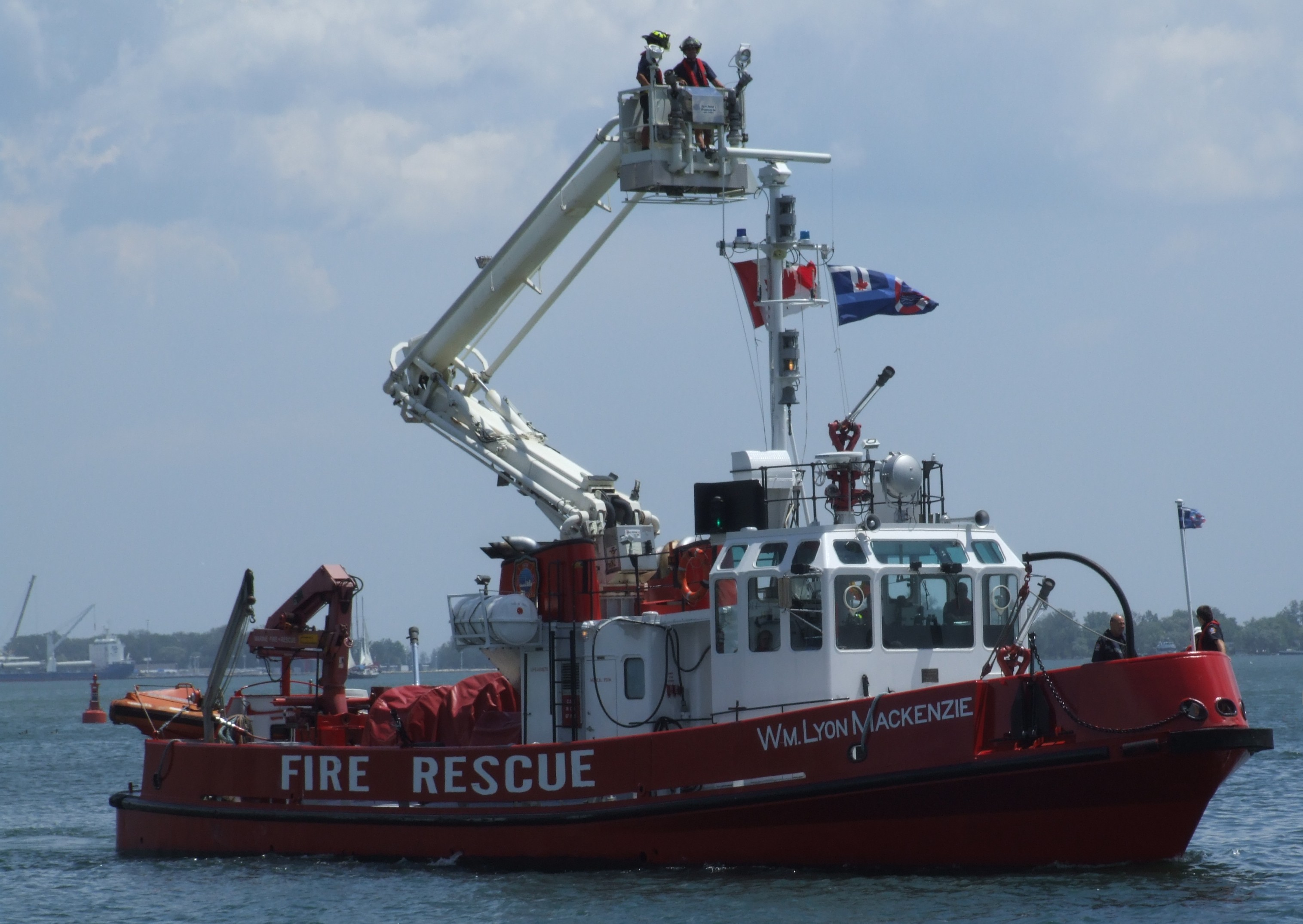
Toronto Fireboat WL Mackenzie

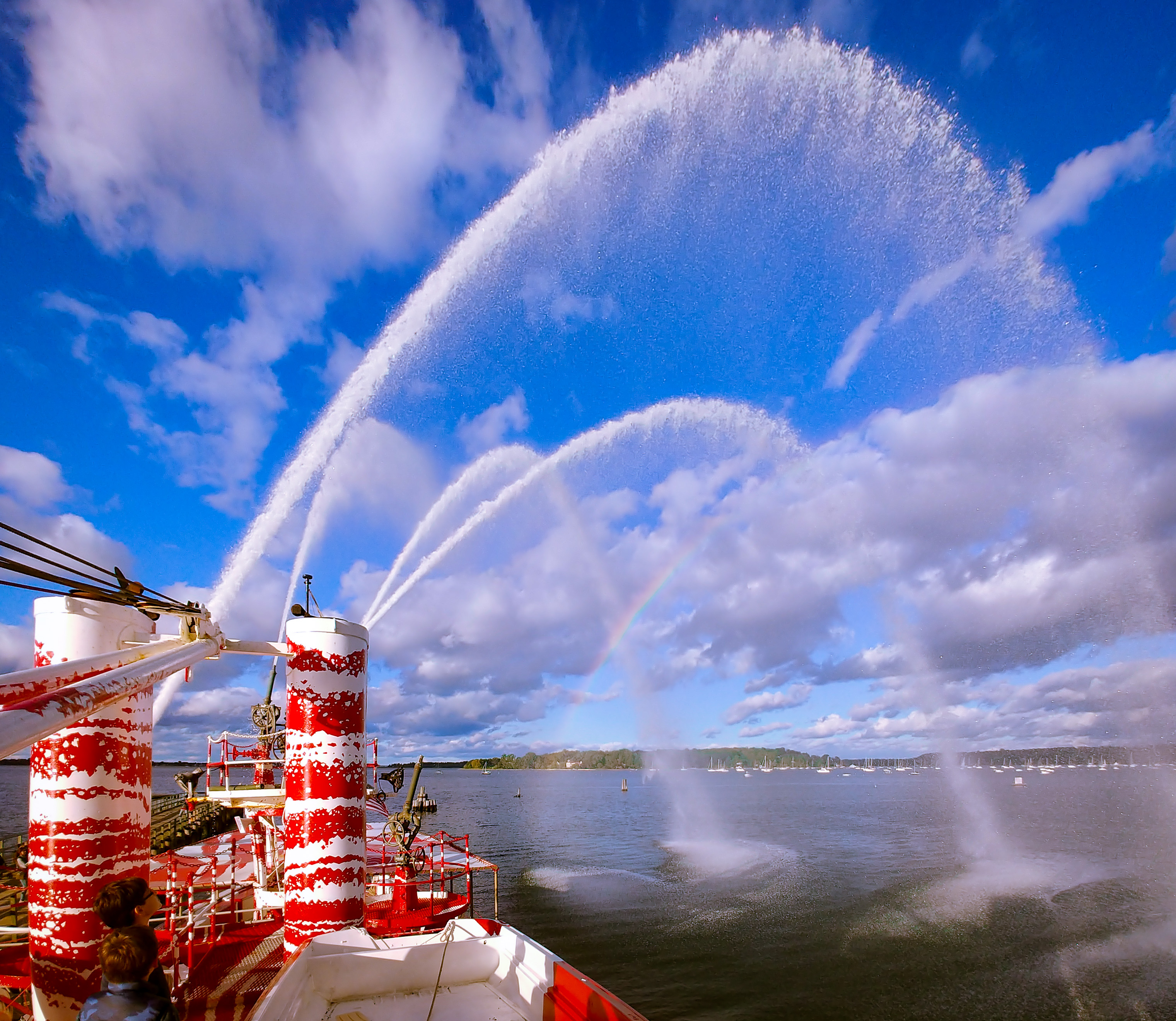
Onboard view of Fireboat John J. Harvey in Tauba Auerbach dazzle camouflage performing a water pumping demonstration in Oyster Bay, New York with artificial rainbow visible

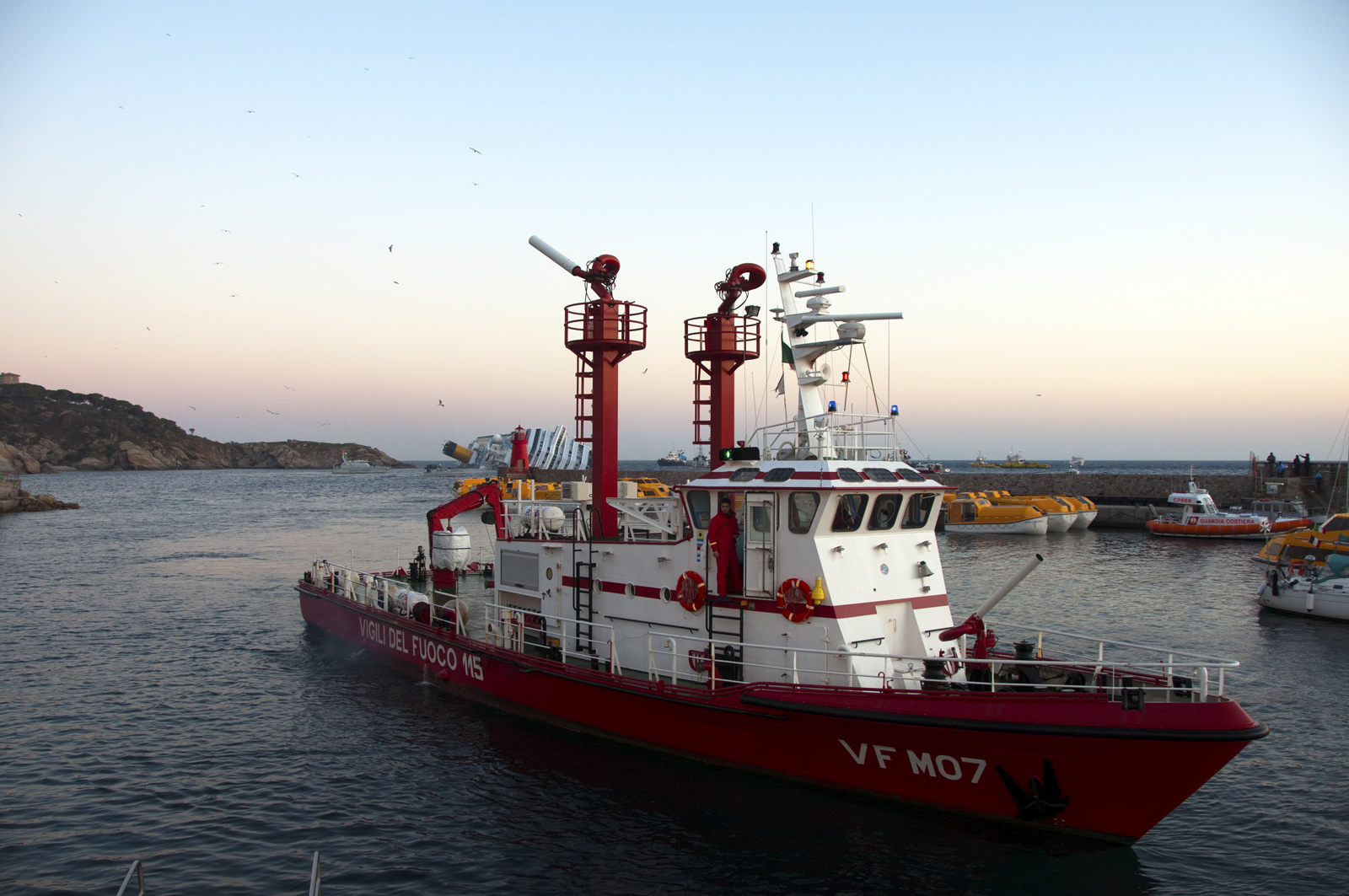
Italian fireboat CLASS M

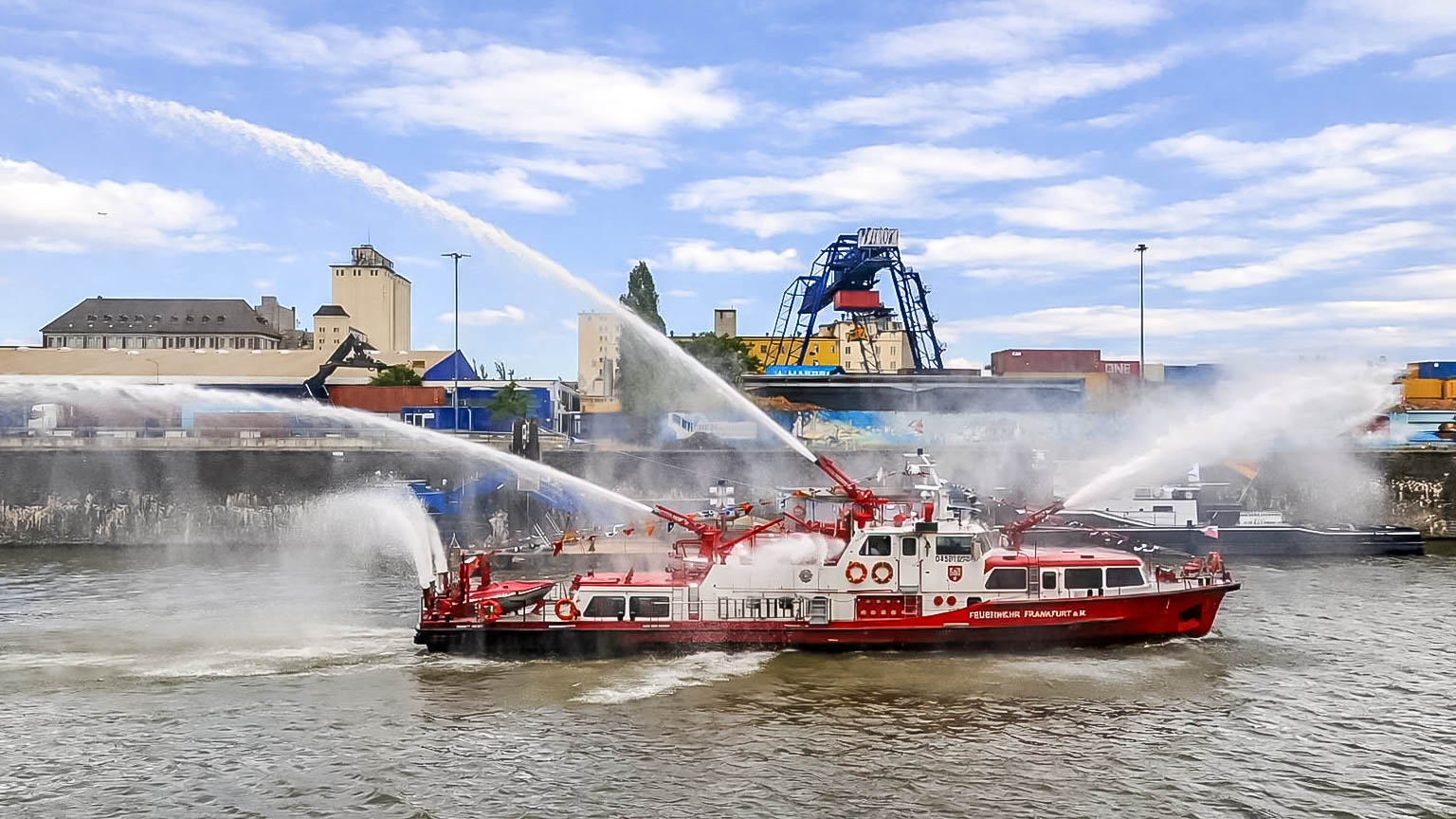
A fireboat of the fire department of Frankfurt, Germany

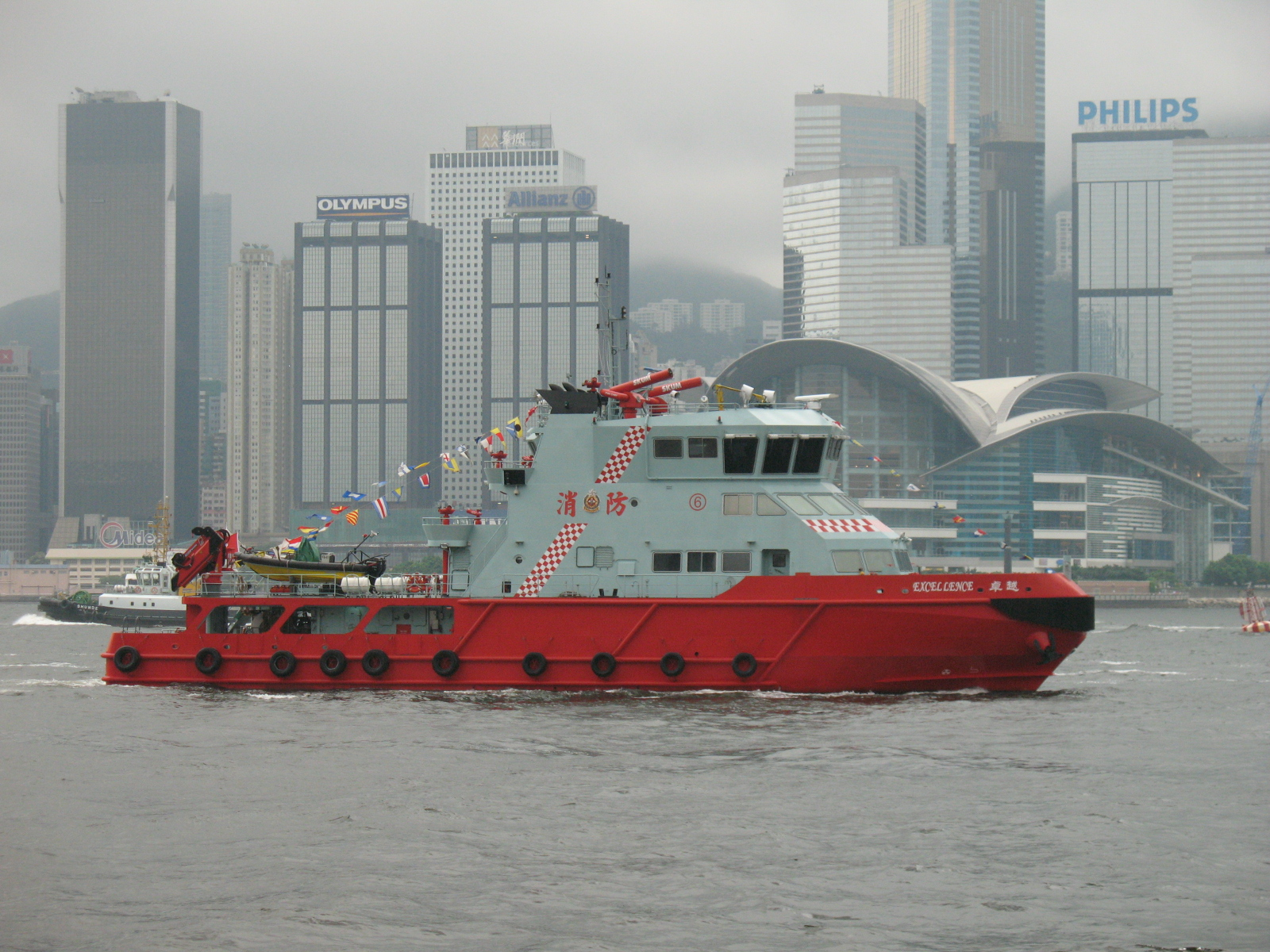
HKFS fireboat Excellence

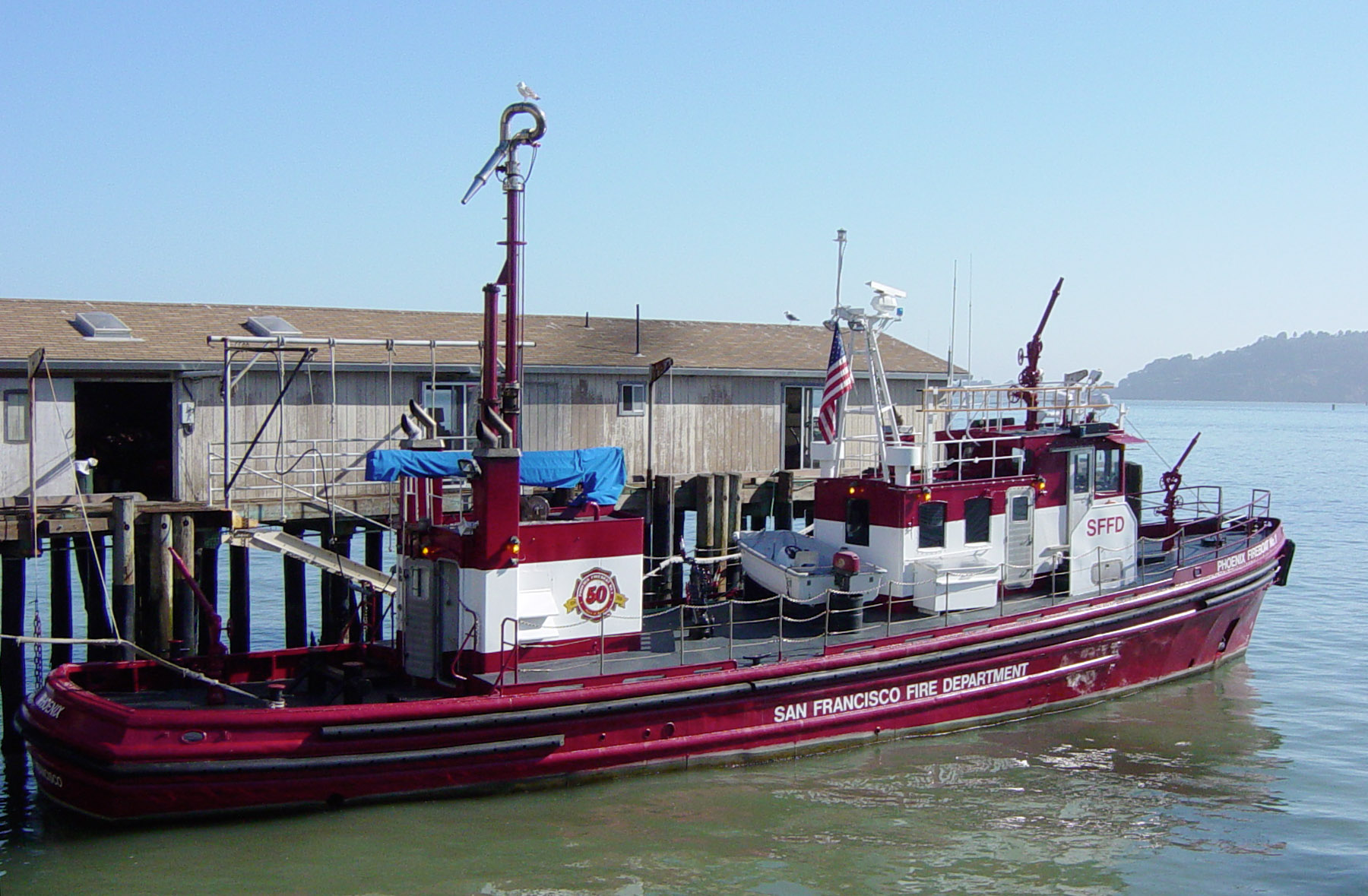
San Francisco fireboat Phoenix

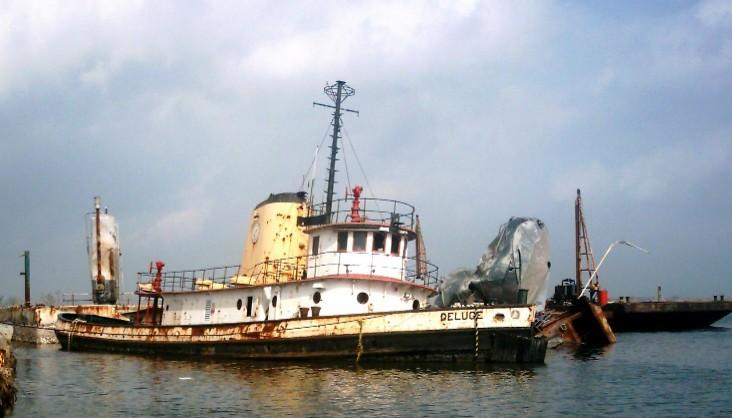
Deluge, retired fire fighting tug

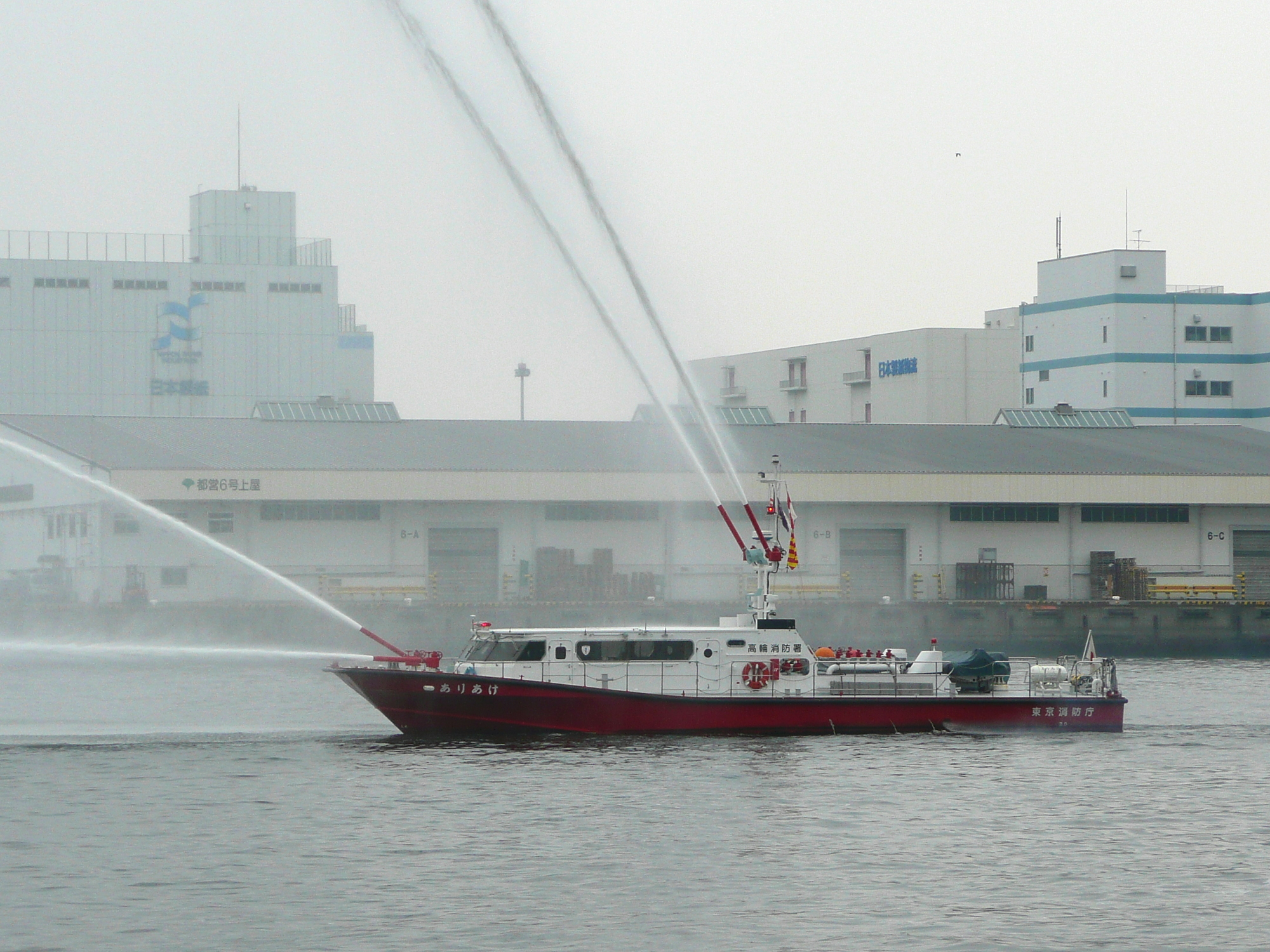
Tokyo Fire Department's Ariake fireboat

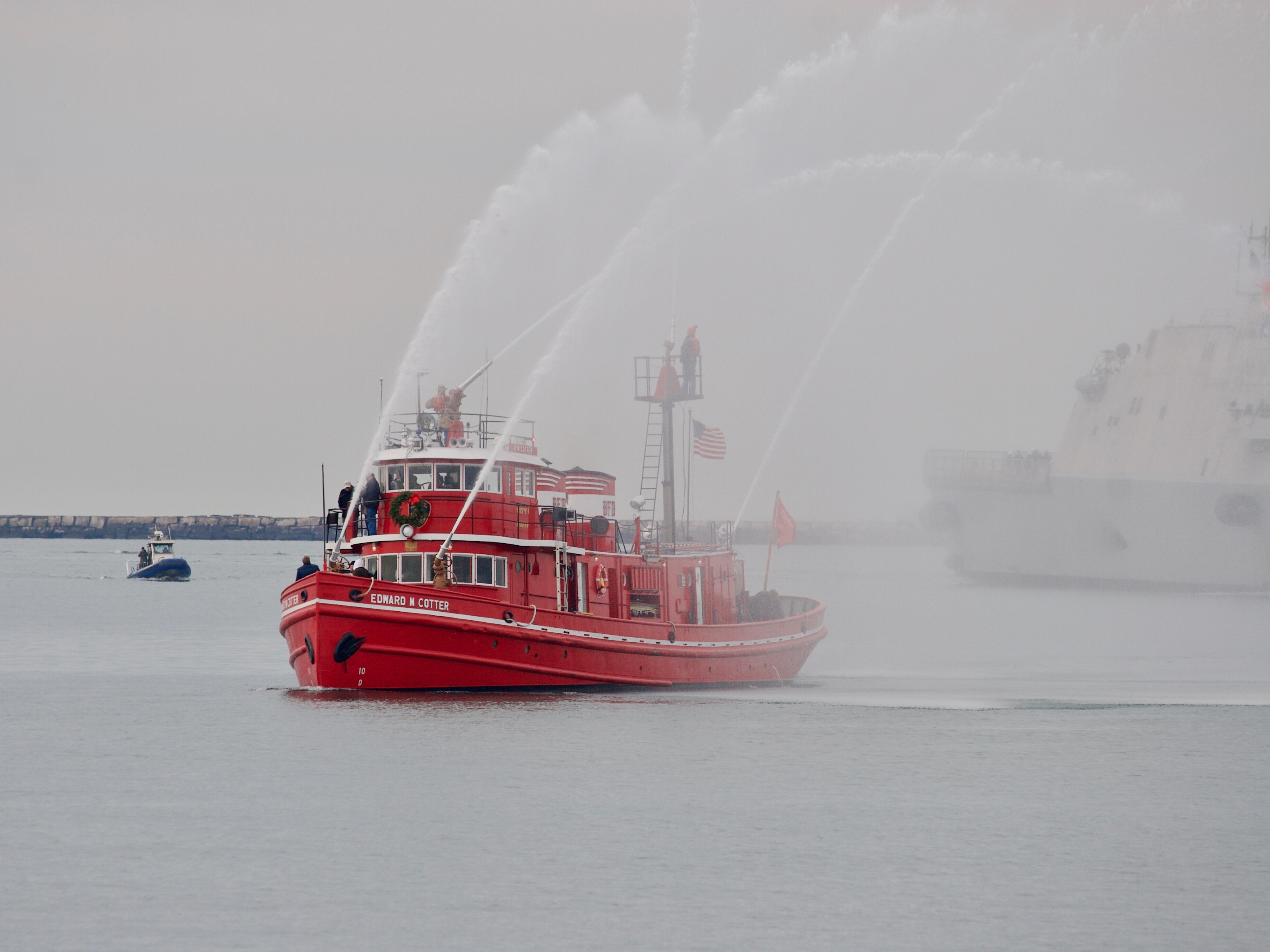
The Edward M. Cotter of Buffalo, New York, considered the world's oldest active fireboat

A fireboat or fire-float is a specialized watercraft with pumps and nozzles designed for fighting shoreline and shipboard fires. The first fireboats, dating to the late 18th century, were tugboats, retrofitted with firefighting equipment. Older designs derived from tugboats and modern fireboats more closely resembling seafaring ships can both be found in service today. Some departments would give their multi-purpose craft the title of "fireboat" also.

They are frequently used for fighting fires on docks and shore side warehouses as they can directly attack fires in the supporting underpinnings of these structures. They also have an effectively unlimited supply of water available, pumping directly from below the hull. Fireboats can be used to assist shore-based firefighters when other water is in low supply or is unavailable, for example, due to earthquake breakage of water mains, as happened in San Francisco due to the 1989 Loma Prieta earthquake.

Some modern fireboats are capable of pumping tens of thousands of gallons of water per minute. An example is Fire Boat #2 of the Los Angeles Fire Department, the Warner Lawrence, with the capability to pump up to 38,000 US gallons per minute (2.4 m^{3}/s; 32,000 imp gal/min) and up to 400 feet (122 m) in the air.

Fireboats are most usually seen by the public when welcoming a fleet or historical ships with a display of their water moving capabilities, throwing large arcs of water in every direction.

Occasionally fireboats are used to carry firefighters, Emergency Medical Technicians, and a physician with their equipment to islands and other boats. Some may be used as icebreakers, like the Chicago Fire Department's Victor L. Schlaeger which can break 8 to 12 inch ice. They may also carry divers or surface water rescue workers. Passengers from ships in danger can be also transferred to various kind of rescue boats. Rescue boats may be used also for oil and chemical destruction on rivers, lakes and seas. For example, the Helsinki Rescue Department in Helsinki, Finland has different types of boats for various kind of firefighting, rescue, and oil destruction tasks.

Also hydrocopters, rigid-hulled inflatable boats, fanboats and even hovercraft and helicopters are used in fire, rescue and medical emergency situations.

Cities with fireboats are usually located on a large body of water with port facilities. Smaller fire departments lacking resources will use a rigid-hulled inflatable boat or borrow boats from local rescue agencies (EMS, Coast Guard, military).

== History ==
The first recorded fire-float was built in 1765 for the Sun Fire Insurance Company in London. This was a manual pump in a small boat, rowed by its crew to the scene of the fire. A similar craft was built in Bristol by James Hillhouse for the Imperial Fire Insurance Office in the 1780s. All fire fighting in Bristol was carried out either by private insurance companies or the Docks Company until the formation of the Bristol Fire Brigade as a branch of the police in 1876. In New York City, a small boat with a hand-pump was used to fight marine fires as early as 1809. By the middle of the nineteenth century, self-propelled steam-fire-floats were beginning to be introduced. The FDNY leased the salvage tug John Fuller as the city's first powered fireboat in 1866. Prior to the "John Fuller", as early as the late 1700s, the FDNY used hand-pumpers mounted to barges and large rowboats. The first purpose built steam driven boats were introduced by Boston Fire Department (William F. Flanders) and FDNY (William F. Havenmeyer) in 1873 and 1875 respectively. The first European fireboat to appear in Bristol was the Fire Queen, built by Shand Mason & Co., London, in 1884 for service in the city docks. The 53 ft. (16.61 m.) long craft was equipped with a three-cylinder steam pump supplying two large hose reels; one of these was replaced with a monitor, or water cannon, in 1900. Fire Queen served until 1922.

== List of famous fireboats ==
- Abram S. Hewitt – FDNY (New York City) (1903–1958) 1904 burning of the General Slocum. (retired and abandon at Witte Marine Scrapyard in Rossville, Staten Island).
- Deluge – Fireboat/Tug (New Orleans) (retired)
- Duwamish – (Seattle) 1909 (retired)
- Edward M. Cotter – Fireboat/Icebreaker (Buffalo, New York) (active) The oldest active fireboat.
- Fireboat No. 1 – (Tacoma, Washington) (retired)
- Fireboat 85 - Contra Costa County Fire Protection District (California). Located in 8th Battalion, Pittsburg Marina.
- Fire Fighter – (NYC) 1938
- Fire Fighter II – FDNY (New York City) (2010) the United States' largest fireboat (Active)
- Governor Irwin – Fireboat/Tug (San Francisco) (1878–1909) Fireboat participated in 1906 San Francisco earthquake and fire. (retired and scrapped)
- Governor Markham – Fireboat/Tug (San Francisco) Fireboat participated in 1906 San Francisco earthquake and fire. (retired and scrapped)
- Hoga – US Navy – Fireboat/Tug (Pearl Harbor attack) and City of Oakland 1940–1996 (retired and under museum ship restoration)
- John Fuller – steam salvage tug (NYC) – 1866 boat had 2000GPM pump and hose. Considered first modern fireboat.
- John Kendall – (Detroit) – Steam fireboat on Detroit River 1930–1976. (retired, scrapped)
- John J. Harvey – (New York City) (1931–1959) (Temporary reinstatement 9/11/2001) (retired)(Museum ship)
- Massey Shaw – (London, England) Serving in London Fire Brigade. Dunkirk Little Ship rescuing troops during Operation Dynamo (retired)
- Phoenix – (San Francisco) (active)
- Pyronaut – moored at Bristol Harbour Railway and Industrial Museum (Bristol, England) (retired)
- Ralph J. Scott – (Los Angeles) (retired)
- Alexander Grantham – (Hong Kong) (retired)
- St. Mungo – Glasgow/Strathclyde (retired)
- Three Forty Three – FDNY (New York City) (2009) Country's largest fireboat, twin to Fire Fighter II. (Active)
- Thomas D'Alesandro – Baltimore (1956–2016) (retired)
- Warner Lawrence – Los Angeles (active)
- William F. Flanders – (Boston) 1873
- William Frederick Havenmeyer – (NYC) 1875–1901 (retired)
- William Lyon Mackenzie – (Toronto, Ontario, Canada) (active)
- William O. Bird II – Sandusky Fire Department (Sandusky, Ohio) (active)
- USS Active / USS Lively – US Navy – Fireboat/Tug (1888–1945) Fireboat participated in 1906 San Francisco earthquake and fire. (retired and scrapped)
- USS Fortune – US Army / US Navy – Fireboat/Tug (1865–1922) Fireboat participated in 1906 San Francisco earthquake and fire. (retired and scrapped)
- USS Leslie – US Army / US Navy – Fireboat/Tug (1861) Fireboat participated in 1906 San Francisco earthquake and fire. (retired and scrapped)

== Departments with fireboats ==
| Department | Total # of boats | Details |
|---|---|---|
| Abingdon (MD) Fire Company | 1 | |
| Albany (NY) Fire Department | 1 | |
| Alexandria (VA) Fire Department | 1 | |
| Annapolis (MD) Fire Department | 1 | |
| Anne Arundel County (MD) Fire Department | 3 | |
| Atlantic City (NJ) Fire Department | 2 | |
| Audubon (NJ) Fire Department | 1 | |
| Baltimore City Fire Department | 3 | |
| Bayonne (NJ) Fire Department | 2 | |
| Bellingham (WA) Fire Department | 1 | |
| Bonita Springs (FL) Fire Department | 1 | |
| Boston Fire Department | 2 | |
| Bowers (DE) Fire Company | 1 | |
| Bowleys Quarters (MD) Volunteer Fire Department | 4 | |
| Brevard County (FL) Fire Department | 1 | |
| Bridgeport (CT) Fire Department | 1 | |
| Broward County (FL) Sheriff's Office Fire Rescue | 1 | |
| Buffalo Fire Department | 1 | Edward M. Cotter |
| Camden (NJ) Fire Department | 1 | |
| Cape Coral (FL) Fire Department | 3 | |
| Carteret (NJ) Fire Department | 1 | |
| Charlotte Fire Department | 1 | |
| Charlotte County (FL) Fire Department | 3 | |
| Chicago Fire Department | 2 | |
| Cincinnati Fire Department | 3 | |
| Clearwater (FL) Fire and Rescue Department | 1 | |
| Cleveland Fire Department | 1 | |
| Contra Costa County(CA) Fire Protection District | 1 | |
| Cranston (RI) Fire Department | 1 | |
| Daytona Beach (FL) Fire Department | 1 | |
| Detroit Fire Department | 2 | |
| Duluth (MN) Fire Department | 1 | |
| Dunedin (FL) Fire Rescue | 1 | |
| East Providence (RI) Fire Department | 1 | |
| Elizabeth (NJ) Fire Department | 1 | |
| Edgewater (NJ) Fire Department | 1 | |
| Estero (FL) Fire Department | 1 | |
| Fairfax County Fire and Rescue Department | 2 | 1 frontline, 1 reserve |
| Fairfield (CT) Fire Department\ | 1 | |
| Fall River (MA) Fire Department | 1 | |
| Fort Lauderdale (FL) Fire Rescue | 3 | |
| Fort Myers (FL) Fire Department | 1 | |
| Greater Naples (FL) Fire Department | 2 | |
| General Fire Brigade of Guangdong | 1 | |
| Georgina Fire and Rescue | 1 | uses a York Regional Police patrol boat equipped with water nozzle |
| Haletown (TN) Fire Department | 1 | Refurbished US Army Corps of Engineers Survey Boat, Cruiser 1 "The Blansett" |
| Harrisburg (PA) Bureau Of Fire | 1 | |
| Hartford (CT) Fire Department | 1 | |
| Hendersonville (TN) Fire Department | 1 | |
| Hillsborough County (FL) Fire Department | 2 | |
| Hoboken (NJ) Fire Department | 1 | |
| Hong Kong Fire Services/Hong Kong International Airport | 12 | 8, and 4 support vessels (command, 2 diving units, speedboat) |
| Honolulu Fire Department | 1 | |
| Iona-McGregor (FL) Fire Department | 1 | |
| Jacksonville Fire and Rescue Department | 3 | |
| Jersey City (NJ) Fire Department | 2 | |
| Kearny (NJ) Fire Department | 1 | |
| Key West (FL) Fire Department | 1 | |
| Lake Ozark (MO) Fire Protection District | 2 | |
| Linden (NJ) Fire Department | 1 | |
| London Fire Brigade | 2 | |
| Longboat Key (FL) Fire Department | 1 | |
| Los Angeles Fire Department | 5 | |
| Macau International Airport Fire Services | 1 | |
| Malaysian Fire and Rescue Department | 1 | |
| Marbury (MD) Fire Department | 1 | |
| Marco Island (FL) Fire Department | 1 | |
| Marseille Naval Fire Battalion | 2 | |
| Massachusetts Port Authority | 3 | with third delivered September 2011. |
| Matlacha (FL) Fire Rescue | 1 | |
| Miami (FL) Fire Department | 4 | |
| Miami Beach (FL) Fire Rescue | 1 | |
| Miami-Dade Fire Rescue Department | 2 | |
| Mid-County (MO) Fire Protection District | 2 | |
| Milwaukee (WI) Fire Department | 1 | |
| Nagasaki (Japan) Fire Department | 1 | |
| Narragansett (RI) Fire Department | 1 | |
| Nashville (TN) Fire Department | 1 | |
| Newark (NJ) Fire Department | 2 | |
| New Haven (CT) Fire Department | 1 | |
| New Orleans (LA) Fire Department | 1 | |
| New York City Fire Department (FDNY) | 10 | 3, plus two reserve, two spare, as well as three smaller boats activated during the summer months |
| Newport News (VA) Fire Department | 1 | |
| Niceville (FL) Fire Department | 1 | |
| Norfolk (VA) Fire Department | 1 | |
| North Charleston (SC) Fire Department | 1 | |
| North Collier County (FL) Fire Department | 1 | |
| North Hudson (NJ) Regional Fire & Rescue | 2 | |
| North Point Edgemere (MD) Vol. Fire Department | 1 | |
| Norwalk (CT) Fire Department | 1 | |
| Osage Beach (MO) Fire Protection District | 1 | |
| Palm Beach County (FL) Fire Rescue | 1 | |
| Palm Harbor (FL) Fire Department | 1 | |
| Panama City (FL) Fire Department | 1 | |
| Pensacola (FL) Fire Department | 1 | |
| Perth Amboy (NJ) Fire Department | 1 | |
| Philadelphia Fire Department | 2 | |
| Pittsburgh Bureau of Fire | 1 | |
| Port Alberni Fire Department (BC) | 1 | |
| Port Canaveral (FL) Fire Department | 1 | |
| Port of Houston Authority Marine Fire Department | 3 | |
| Portland (ME) Fire Department | 1 | |
| Portland (OR) Fire & Rescue | 2 | |
| Portsmouth (VA) Fire Department | 1 | |
| Poulsbo Fire Department (WA)/ Kitsap County Fire District #18 | 1 | |
| Prince George's County (MD) Fire/EMS Department | 1 | |
| Prince George's County (MD) Volunteer Fire Department | 2 | |
| Providence (RI) Fire Department | 1 | |
| Red Bank (NJ) Fire Department | 1 | |
| Rochester (NY) Fire Department | 1 | |
| San Bernardino County (CA) Fire Department | 4 | |
| San Francisco Fire Department | 3 | |
| Safety Harbor (FL) Fire Department | 1 | |
| San Diego Fire-Rescue Department | 6 | |
| Sandusky (OH) Fire Department | 1 | |
| Sanford (FL) Fire Department | 1 | |
| Sanibel Island (FL) Fire Department | 1 | |
| São Paulo (Brazil) Firefighting Corp. | 2 | |
| Scappoose (OR) Fire District | 1 | |
| Sea Isle City (NJ) Fire Department | 1 | |
| Seattle Fire Department | 3 | 1 reserve |
| Secaucus (NJ) Fire Department | 1 | |
| Seward (AK) Fire Department | 1 | |
| Seoul Metropolitan Fire and Disaster Management Department | 0 | 1 on order |
| Singapore Changi Airport Airport Emergency Services Sea | 2 | 2 hovercraft used for marine rescue and firefighting |
| St. Louis Fire Department | 4 | |
| South Australian Metropolitan Fire Service | 1 | |
| Stamford (CT) Fire Department | 1 | |
| Susquehanna Hose Company of Havre de Grace (MD) | 1 | |
| Syracuse (NY) Fire Department | 1 | |
| Tacoma (WA) Fire Department | 2 | |
| Tampa (FL) Fire/Rescue Department | 4 | |
| Tarrytown (NY) Fire Department | 1 | |
| Toronto Fire Services | 3 | 2nd boat is a light utility boat and third built fitted to replace current utility boat. See Fireboats of Toronto. |
| Tinicum (PA) Fire Department | 1 | |
| Tokyo Fire Department | 10 | |
| Trenton (NJ) Fire Department | 1 | |
| Vancouver Fire and Rescue Services | 5 | |
| Virginia Beach Fire Department | 1 | |
| Warwick (RI) Fire Department | 1 | |
| Washington (D.C.) Fire Department | 3 | |
| Westville (NJ) Fire Department | 1 | |
| Wilmington (DE) Fire Department | 1 | |
| Water Witch (MD) Fire Company | 1 | |
| Wilmington (NC) Fire Department | 1 | |
| Woodbridge (NJ) Fire Department | 1 | |
| Yonkers (NY) Fire Department | 1 | |

== Government and military with fireboats ==
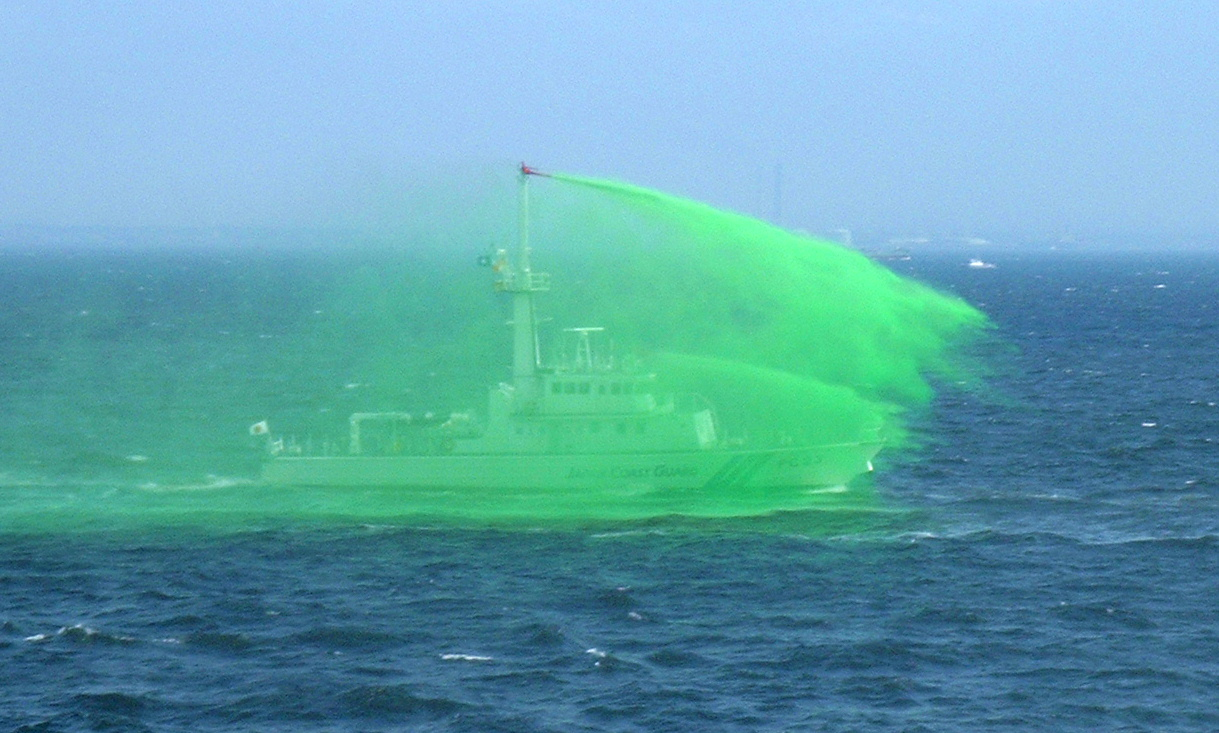
Japan Coast Guard patrol boat with water cannons discharging

- Japan Coast Guard – 9; 230 patrol boats with water cannons or firefighting support systems
- United States Coast Guard
- Fire class fireboat of the Royal Canadian Navy's auxiliary fleet (2):
  - CFAV Firebird (YTR 561)
  - CFAV Firebrand (YTR 562)

== See also ==
- Fireboat Station, Tacoma, Washington
- Lambeth Fire Station, London, England, with a river fireboat station
- Firefighter
- Firefighting apparatus
- Police watercraft
- Rigid-hulled inflatable boat
