= Fireboat Station =

- U.S. National Register of Historic Places
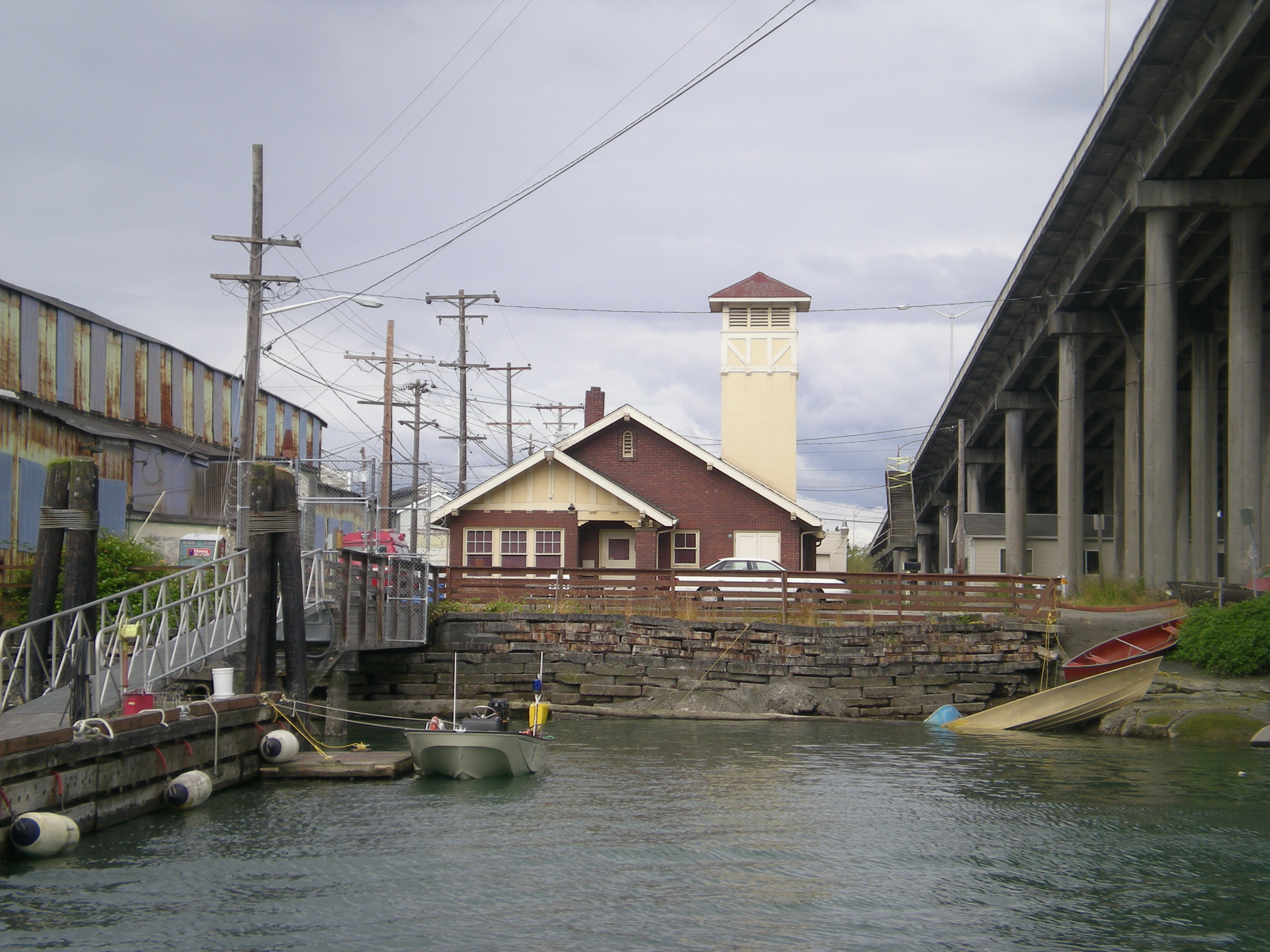

- Location within Washington (state)
- Location: 302 E. Eleventh St., Tacoma, Washington
- Coordinates: 47°15′16″N 122°25′51″W
- Area: less than one acre
- Built: 1928
- Architect: Morton J. Morton
- Architectural style: Bungalow/American craftsman
- MPS: Historic Fire Stations of Tacoma, Washington TR
- NRHP reference No.: 86000978
- Added to NRHP: May 2, 1986

The Fireboat Station in Tacoma, Washington, built in 1928, was listed on the National Register of Historic Places in 1986. It was the base for three fireboats.

The station was deemed "significant for its association with the development of Tacoma's port/industrial district and the growth of the city's vital municipal services. The station is also an important local example of innovations in fire station design that followed the motorization of firefighting equipment."

It was the city's smallest fire station, and a picturesque one. It was designed by architect Morton J. Nicholson, and is Craftsman in style.

Built in 1928 as part of a bond-funded project that built three other stations, as well as the Fire Alarm Station. While fireboats were still housed there in 2008, the station itself was no longer staffed.

== Gallery ==
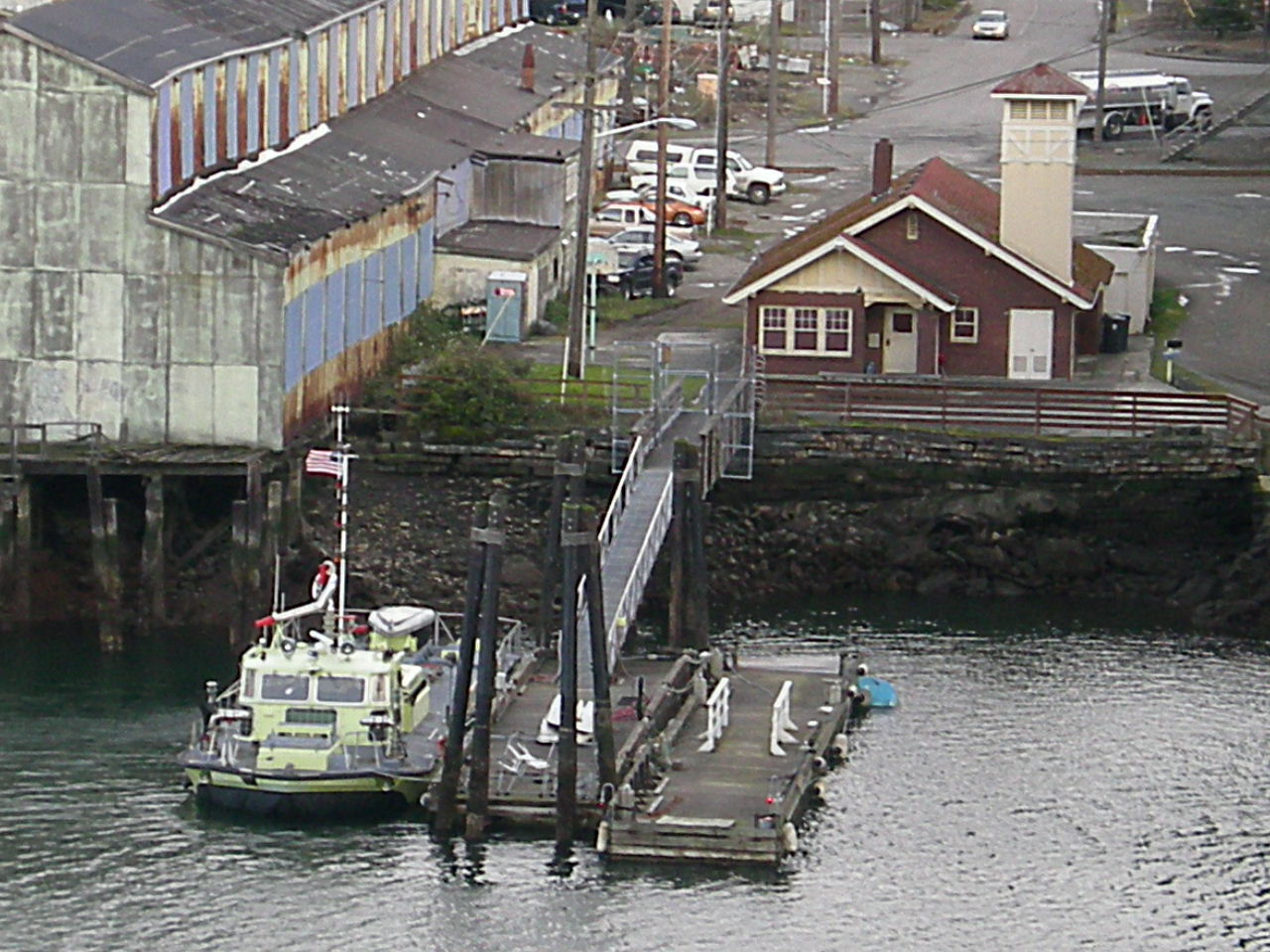
With prominent hose tower

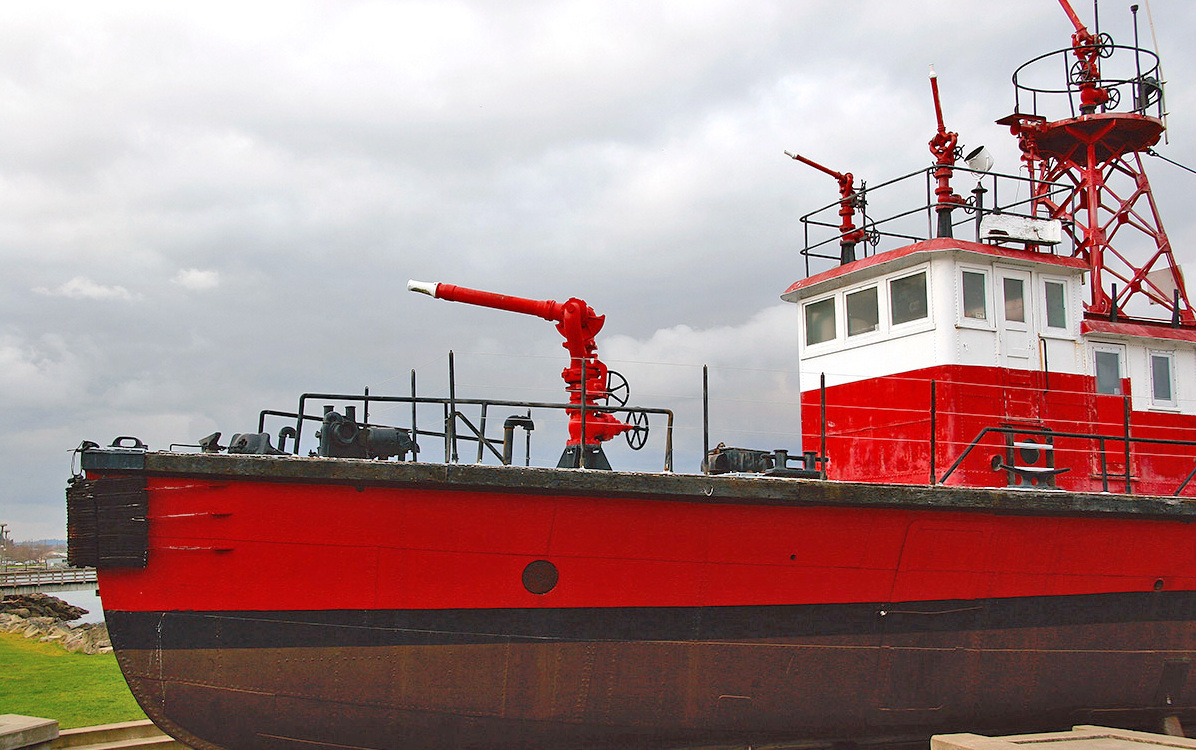
Fireboat No. 1, built in 1929, retired from active duty in 1985

== See also ==
- Lambeth Fire Station, London, England, with its River station for fireboats
