= Lady Anne =

Lady Anne may refer to:

== People ==
- Lady Anne Bacon (née Coke) (c. 1528–1610), English gentlewoman and scholar
- Lady Anne Barnard (née Anne Lindsay), also Lady Anne Lindsay (1750–1825), author, artist, and socialite
- Lady Anne Berry (née Walpole) (b. 1919), English and New Zealand horticulturist
- Lady Anne Blunt (née King-Noel), 15th Baroness Wentworth (1837–1917), co-founder of the Crabbet Arabian Stud
- Lady Anne Brewis (d. 2002), English botanist
- Lady Anne Cavendish-Bentinck (1916–2008), member of the British nobility and wealthy landowner
- Lady Anne Churchill (1683–1716), daughter of John Churchill and Sarah Churchill, Duchess of Marlborough, and an ancestor of Sir Winston Churchill
- Lady Anne Clifford (1590–1676), the only surviving child of George Clifford, 3rd Earl of Cumberland, by his wife Lady Margaret Russell
- Lady Anne Conway, also Lady Anne Finch Conway, also Anne Conway, Viscountess Conway (née Finch) (1631–1679), English philosopher
- Lady Anne Cottington, wife of Francis Cottington, 1st Baron Cottington (c. 1579–1652)
- Lady Anne Farquharson-MacKintosh, also Lady Anne Mackintosh (1723–1787), Jacobite of the Scottish Clan Farquharson and the wife of Angus, Chief of the Clan MacKintosh
- Lady Anne Halkett (née Murray) (1623–1699), religious writer and autobiographer
- Lady Anne Horton, also Anne, Duchess of Cumberland and Strathearn (1742–1808), member of the British royal family and the wife of Prince Henry, Duke of Cumberland and Strathearn
- Lady Anne Hyde (1638–1671), first wife of James, Duke of York (the future King James II of England and King James VII of Scotland), and the mother of two monarchs, Queen Mary II of England and of Scotland and Queen Anne of Great Britain
- Lady Anne Lambton (b. 1954), British actress
- Lady Anne Palmer, later Anne Lennard, Countess of Sussex (1661/1662-1721/1722), alias Fitzroy, eldest daughter of Barbara Palmer née Villiers, 1st Duchess of Cleveland
- Lady Anne Rhys (née Wellesley) (1910–1998), British aristocrat and socialite
- Lady Anne Stanley, Countess of Castlehaven (1580–1647), daughter and heir of Ferdinando Stanley, 5th Earl of Derby
- Lady Anne Stanley, Countess of Ancram (c. 1600–1656/1657), daughter of William Stanley, 6th Earl of Derby
- Lady Anne Wilson, also Lady Anne Glenny Wilson (1848–1930), Australian poet and novelist

== Fictional characters ==
- Anne-Marie, Lady Byrne, a fictional character in the BBC medical drama Holby City

== Ships ==
- USS Lady Anne (SP-154), a United States Navy patrol boat in commission from 1917 to 1919
- Lady Anne (fireboat), see fireboats of Baltimore
