= St. Mungo (fireboat) =

Water vessel

The St Mungo was a fireboat operated by Glasgow Fire Services, in Glasgow, Scotland, from 1959 to 1975. When launched, she was described as the most modern fireboat in the United Kingdom.

== History ==
The St Mungo replaced an earlier steam powered fireboat. Glasgow was once one of the busiest ports in the United Kingdom, and the St Mungo and earlier vessels provided an important service. However, by 1975 when the Strathclyde Fire Brigade was formed through the amalgamation of Glasgow Fire Services with neighbouring fire services, Glasgow's use of the River Clyde had changed, and the vessels declared surplus, and retired. She was sold in 1978 to serve as an offshore tender.

== Propulsion ==
She was propelled by twin diesel engines, at up to 9 knots. Each diesel was rated at 160 brake horsepower (120 kW)

== Pumps ==
The St Mungo's two turbine water pumps could each provide 3,000 gallons per minute. The turbine pumps provided water to up to six water cannons. Each turbine pump was powered by a diesel rated at 400 brake horsepower (300 kW).
