= Fireboat No. 1 =

Museum ship in the United States

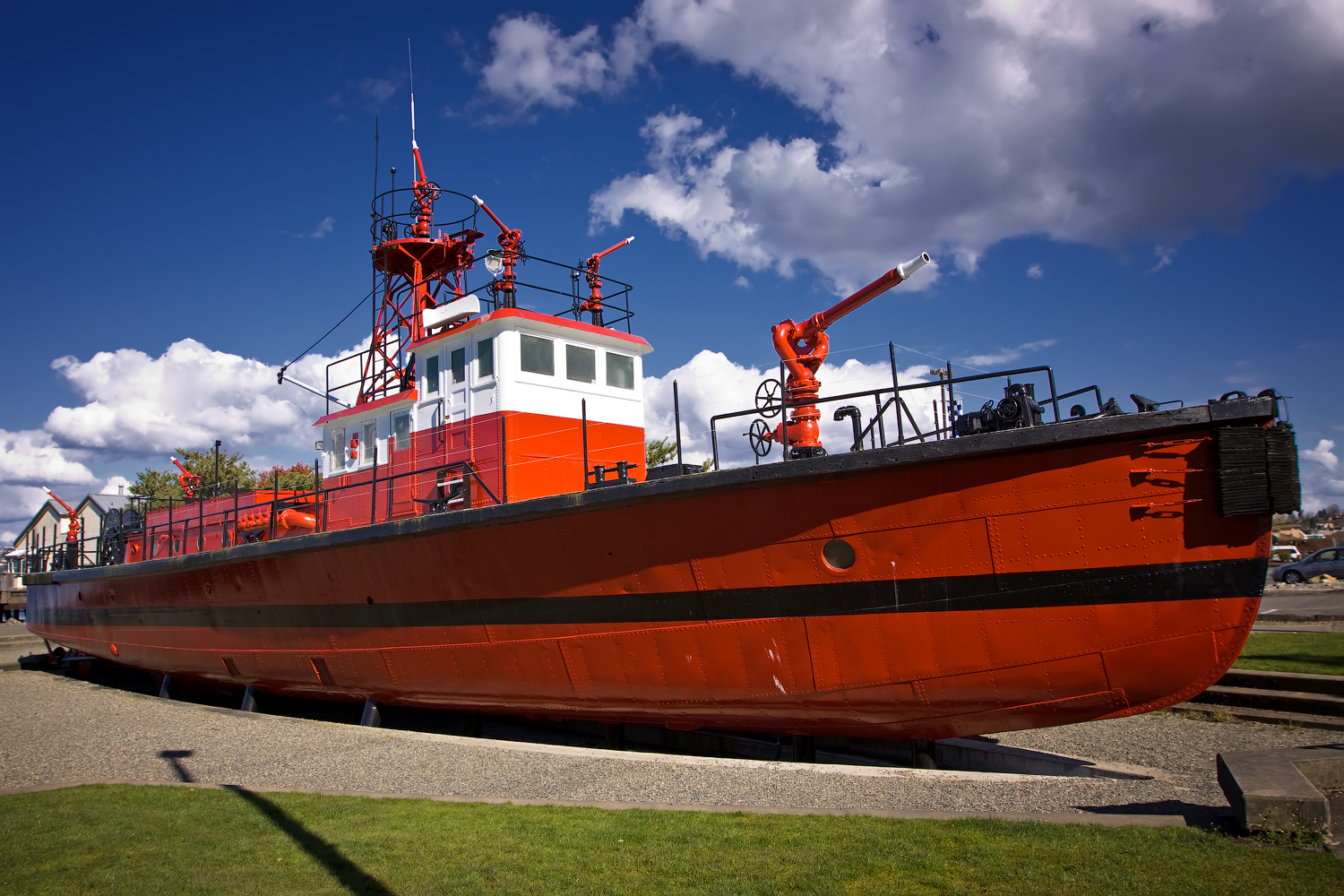

History

Washington
- Name: Fireboat No. 1
- Owner: Port of Tacoma
- Builder: Coastline Shipbuilding Company
- Cost: $148,000
- Launched: 1929
- Status: Museum ship

General characteristics
- Length: 96 ft 6 in (29.41 m)
- Beam: 21 ft 6 in (6.55 m)
- Draft: 6-foot (1.8 m)
- Fireboat No. 1
- U.S. National Register of Historic Places
- U.S. National Historic Landmark
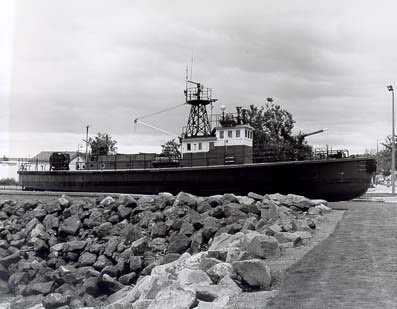
- Fire Boat No. 1 in her dry berth

- Location within Washington (state)
- Location: Tacoma, WA
- Coordinates: 47°16′56.27″N 122°28′49.47″W
- Built: 1929
- Architect: T.M. Rowlands; Coast Line Shipbuilding Co.
- NRHP reference No.: 83004254

Significant dates
- Added to NRHP: 2 December 1983
- Designated NHL: 19 June 1980

Fireboat No. 1 is a historic fireboat on display in a permanent land installation on the waterfront in the Old Town area of Tacoma, Washington. Built in 1929, she was for more than fifty years the sole firefighting vessel for the Port of Tacoma. She was designated a National Historic Landmark in 1980.

== Description and history ==
Fireboat No. 1 is 96 feet 6 inches (29.41 m) long with a 21-foot-6-inch (6.55 m) beam and a 6-foot (1.8 m) draft. Her seven water cannons have a capacity of 10,000 US gallons per minute (0.63 m^{3}/s). She has a steel deck and pilothouse. Her deck was originally lined with pipes capable of creating a spray around the ship. As built, she had three-screw drive powered by 425-horsepower gasoline engine, and was capable of making a speed of 15 knots. Two additional engines provided power to its water pumps, and another two could be used either for movement or pumping, differentiated by a clutch setting.

Fireboat No. 1 was built in 1929 for the Port of Tacoma by the Coastline Shipbuilding Company of Tacoma, Washington for US$148,000. She is the only fireboat in U.S. history to protect a major port by herself for more than half a century. After 54 years of service in waterfront fire protection, harbor security patrols, search and rescue missions, and water pollution control, Fireboat No. 1 was put up on a permanent dry berth at a public beach near Tacoma's Old Town neighborhood. She is one of only five fireboats designated as a National Historic Landmark. Visitors are able to walk around her exterior, but her interior is closed to the public.

== See also ==
- Historic preservation
- List of National Historic Landmarks in Washington (state)
