= USS Active (1888) =

Tugboat of the United States Navy

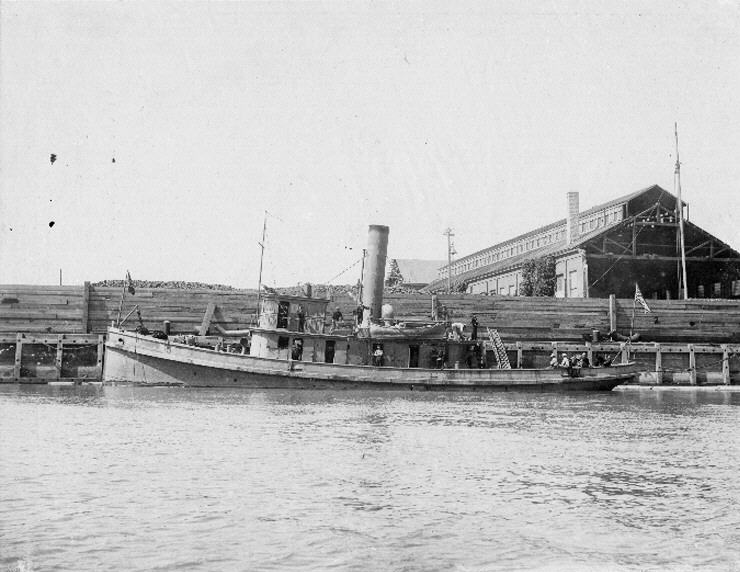
- USS Active c. 1898

History

United States
- Name: Active (1888-1918); Lively (1918-1930); Active (1937-1942); YT-323 (1942-1945); Active (1945-1963)
- Builder: Union Iron Works
- Launched: 4 August 1888
- Completed: 1888
- Acquired: 18 April 1898
- Commissioned: 6 July 1898
- Decommissioned: 16 August 1926
- Renamed: Lively, 11 April 1918
- Reclassified: (YT-14), 17 July 1920
- Stricken: 28 August 1929
- Fate: Sold to Puget Sound Tug and Barge Co.
- Recommissioned: 30 April 1942
- Decommissioned: 6 August 1945
- Reclassified: YT-323
- Stricken: 1 September 1945
- Fate: Returned to owner, scrapped 1963

General characteristics
- Type: Harbor Tug
- Displacement: 296 long tons (301 t)
- Length: 107 ft (33 m) LOA; 100 ft (30.5 m) LBP/Registry
- Beam: 22 ft 6 in (6.86 m)
- Draft: 10 ft (3.0 m)
- Depth of hold: 13 ft (4.0 m)
- Propulsion: compound steam engine
- Speed: 12 knots (22 km/h; 14 mph)
- Complement: 21
- Armament: 2 × 37mm. revolving cannon; 1 × Gatling gun

USS Active was a tug constructed in 1888 at San Francisco by the Union Iron Works. The tug, first steel tug built on the West Coast, was launched 4 August 1888. She was acquired by the United States Navy from John D. Spreckels Brothers Co. on 18 April 1898 "for auxiliary purposes incident to a state of war." Converted for naval service at her builder's yard, she was commissioned at the Mare Island Navy Yard on 6 July 1898. She was the third US Navy ship to be named Active.

== Construction ==
The tug was the first steel tug built on the U.S. West Coast with only the captain's stateroom and pilot house not steel. Those were teak finished with cherry and ash paneling. Length was 100 ft (30.5 m), (Note: Navy uses length overall with commercial length often length between perpendiculars or registered length.) beam 22 ft (6.7 m) with hold depth of 13 ft (4.0 m). Draft forward was 3 ft (0.9 m) and aft was 12 ft (3.7 m). Five watertight bulkheads divided the vessel into compartments. A boiler 12 ft 6 in (3.8 m) long by 13 ft 6 in (4.1 m) circumference provided steam to a compound engine driving a propeller 9 ft 6 in (2.9 m) in diameter for a speed of 14 kn (16 mph; 26 km/h). Coal consumption was 10 tons per 24 hours with bunker capacity of 65 tons.

== Service history ==
=== 1898-1929 ===
Active was shifted to the Bremerton Navy Yard at Bremerton, Wash., in August 1898 and served there as a harbor tug until she returned to Mare Island in 1899 to commence a long tour of duty. On 18 April 1906, an earthquake nearly demolished the city of San Francisco, and fires raged in its aftermath. Since the city fire department was nearly helpless, the Navy lent a hand. Active marines and immediately lay alongside Pier 8, playing out several hose lines to fight the nearest part of the blaze. For the remainder of the week, the crews of Active, the torpedo boat destroyer Perry, and the fire tug Lexlie fought fires and policed and patrolled the districts in which they labored. Active later assisted in saving the Pacific Mail dock and that general section of the San Francisco waterfront. On 21 April, Active steamed to Mare Island to bring back relief firefighters from the crews of the cruisers Chicago and Marblehead.

Transferred to the Naval Training Station at San Francisco on 10 May 1915, she returned to Mare Island in 1918. She was renamed Lively on 11 April 1918; on 17 July 1920, she received the hull number YT-14.

In 1926 the tug sank at her moorings alongside a dock at Mare Island. A Board of Inspection and Survey deemed Lively—raised after the accident—unfit for service and she was decommissioned on 16 August 1926. Her name was struck from the Navy list on 28 August 1929. She was sold to the Puget Sound Tug and Barge Co., of Seattle, on 11 February 1930 and resumed commercial service. She was renamed Active around 1937–1938.

=== 1942-1945 ===
Reacquired by the Navy under a bareboat charter at Seattle, Wash., on 2 March 1942, the tug was designated as the unnamed YT-323. Converted for naval work by the Lake Washington Shipyards, Houghton, Wash., YT-323 was placed in service on 30 April 1942 and assigned to the 13th Naval District to provide towing services at Kodiak, Alaska. She was later reclassified as a medium harbor tug, YTM-323, on 11 May 1944, and was placed out of service on 6 August 1945.

=== Decommissioning and disposal ===
Struck from the Navy list on 1 September 1945, the tug was returned to the Puget Sound Tug and Barge Co., which operated her as Active until 1963, when she was scrapped.
