= Fireboats of Baltimore =

As one of the United States's more significant seaports, there is a long tradition of fireboats in Baltimore. When Baltimore added the diesel powered fireboat Mayor Thomas D'Alesandro, Jr., in 1956, she joined a fleet of older steam-powered fireboats, some of which had been launched in the 19th century. She was Baltimore's first new fireboat in 35 years.

Some Baltimore fireboats
image	name	introduced	retired	pumping capacity	notes
	Cataract	7/1/1891	?	4400	The city's first fireboat. In service 7/1/1891 as Engine Company No. 16 at "Commercial Wharf" in Fells Point, Moved to Municipal Pier 7 at the foot of President Street 9/15/1909.
	Deluge	3/13/1911	?	12,000	In service 3/13/1911 at Municipal Pier 7 at the foot of President Street as Engine Company No. 39. Moved to Fort McHenry on 5/28/1917. Along with the FDNY fireboat New Yorker, which also was rated at 12,000, the Deluge was the most powerful fireboat afloat when it was built.
		4/22/1912			The Marine Division of the Baltimore Fire Department was created, consisting of Engine Companies 16 and 39.
	Cascade	6/27/1921			In service on 6/27/1921 as Engine Company No. 49 at Municipal Pier 7 with Engine Company No. 16. On 12/16/1921, moved to B&O Railroad Company's Sugar House Wharf at the foot of Behhill Road in Curtis Bay.
	Torrent	4/29/1922	?		Said to be similar to, but more powerful than the Deluge. In service as Engine Company No. 48 on 4/29/1922 at Pier 3 Canton Railroad, 5th and 14th Streets.
		10/1/1937			On 10/1/1937, Engine Company No. 39 at Fort McHenry occupies its new quarters. A 2-story frame cottage 50' x 75' costing $7,5000. Built on the site of the former qusrters. The coal fired boilers converted to oil boilers by the Fire Department's repair shop.
	S.C. 428/ Cascade	10/1/1949	12/1/1971		Converted Navy Sub Chaser No. 428 was gifted to Baltimore. Renamed Fireboat Cascade 10/1/1949.
	Mayor Thomas A'lessandro Jr	9/14/1956	?	12,000	The city's first diesel fireboat. Dedicated 9/14/1956. Relocated to the City Pier at the Patapsco River Wastewater Treatment Plant, foot of Asiatic Avenue, Wagner's Point on 8/22/1958.
	Mayor J. Harold Grady	1961	2007	6,000	Mayor J. Harold Grady, P.W. Wilkinson, and August Emrich were sister ships.
	P.W. Wilkinson	1961	2002	6,000	Mayor J. Harold Grady, P.W. Wilkinson, and August Emrich were sister ships.
	August Emrich	1961	2002	6,000	Mayor J. Harold Grady, P.W. Wilkinson, and August Emrich were sister ships.
	Fire Rescue Boat 1	2003	n/a	1,500	Built by SeaArk, is 30 feet (9.1 m) long, requires a crew of just two.
	Fire Rescue Boat 2	2003	n/a	1,500	Built by SeaArk, is 30 feet (9.1 m) long, requires a crew of just two.
	John R. Frazier	2007	n/a	7,000	Built by Hike Metal, is 87 feet (27 m) long, powered by twin 1,650hp diesel motors, and requires a crew of at least four.
