= Lambeth Fire Station =

Grade II listed building in London, England

Coordinates: 51.4926°N 0.121°W

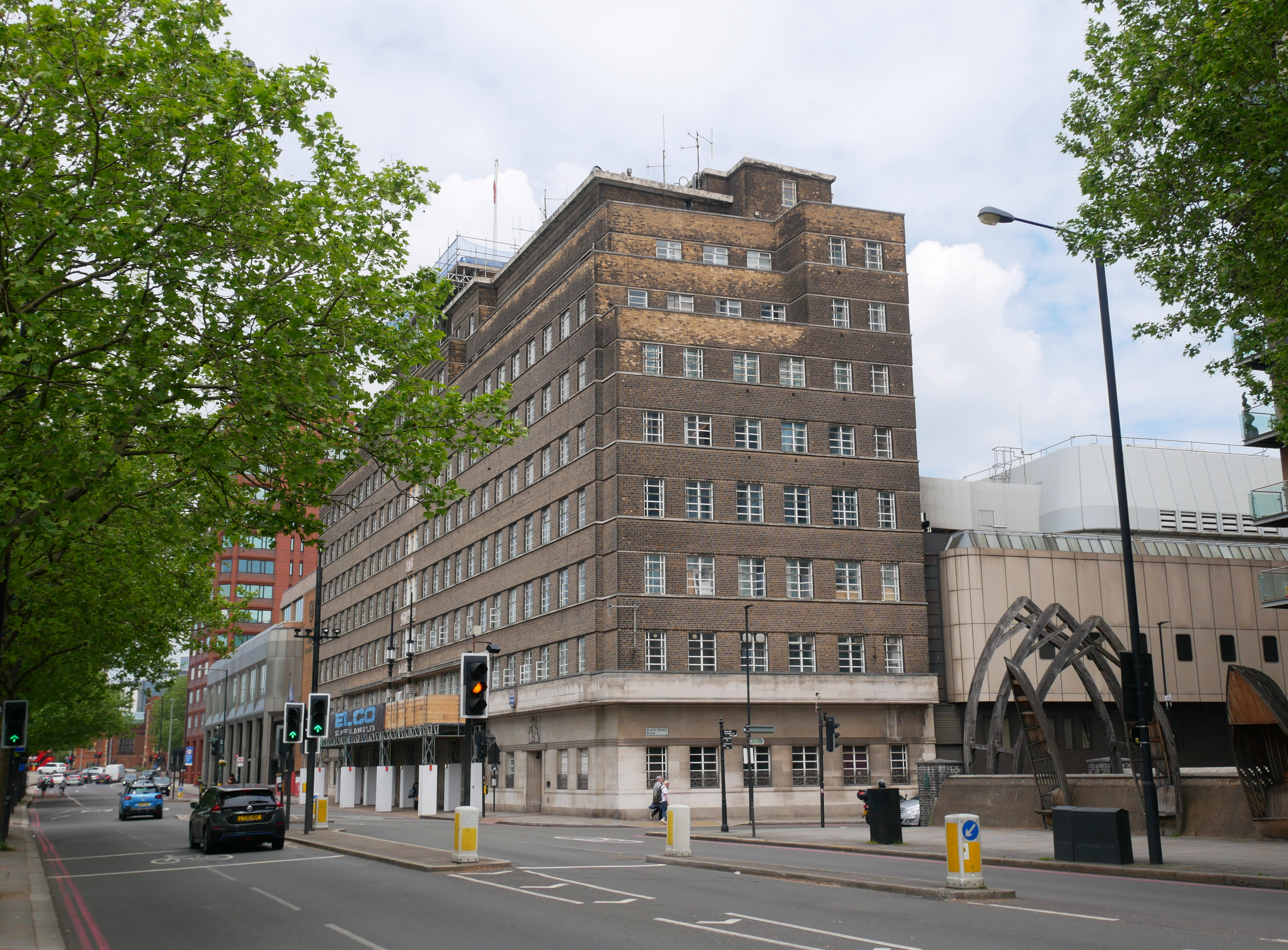
View of the fire station from the southwest

The Lambeth Fire Station is the former headquarters of the London Fire Brigade. It is a Moderne-style building built in 1937. It included a drill tower, behind, built at the same time. It also included a ramp to a water-level station for fireboats. The building is a Grade II listed building.

== Gallery ==
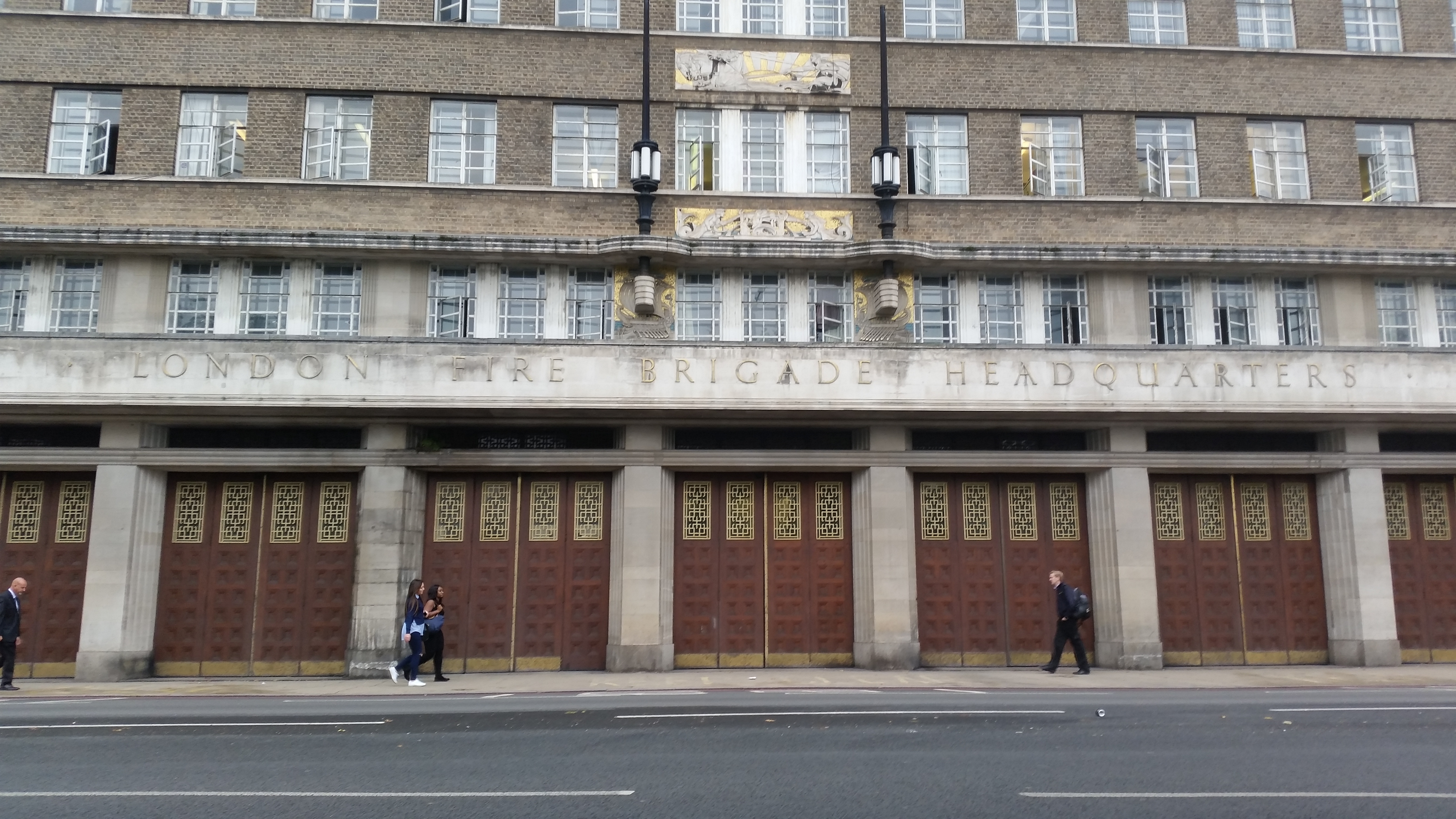
Building frontage

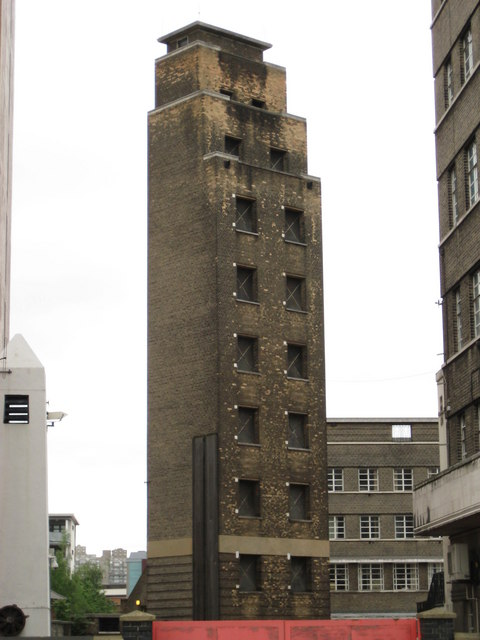
Drill tower, where exercises could be watched by hundreds from balconies on the headquarters building

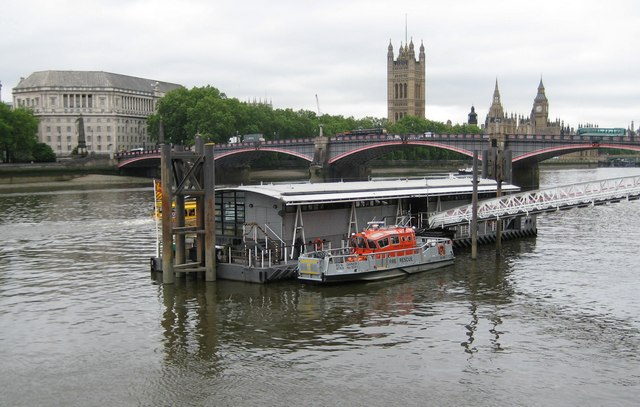
Lambeth River Fire Station, with the Firedart, in 2008
