= Fireboat Thomas A'lessandro Jr =

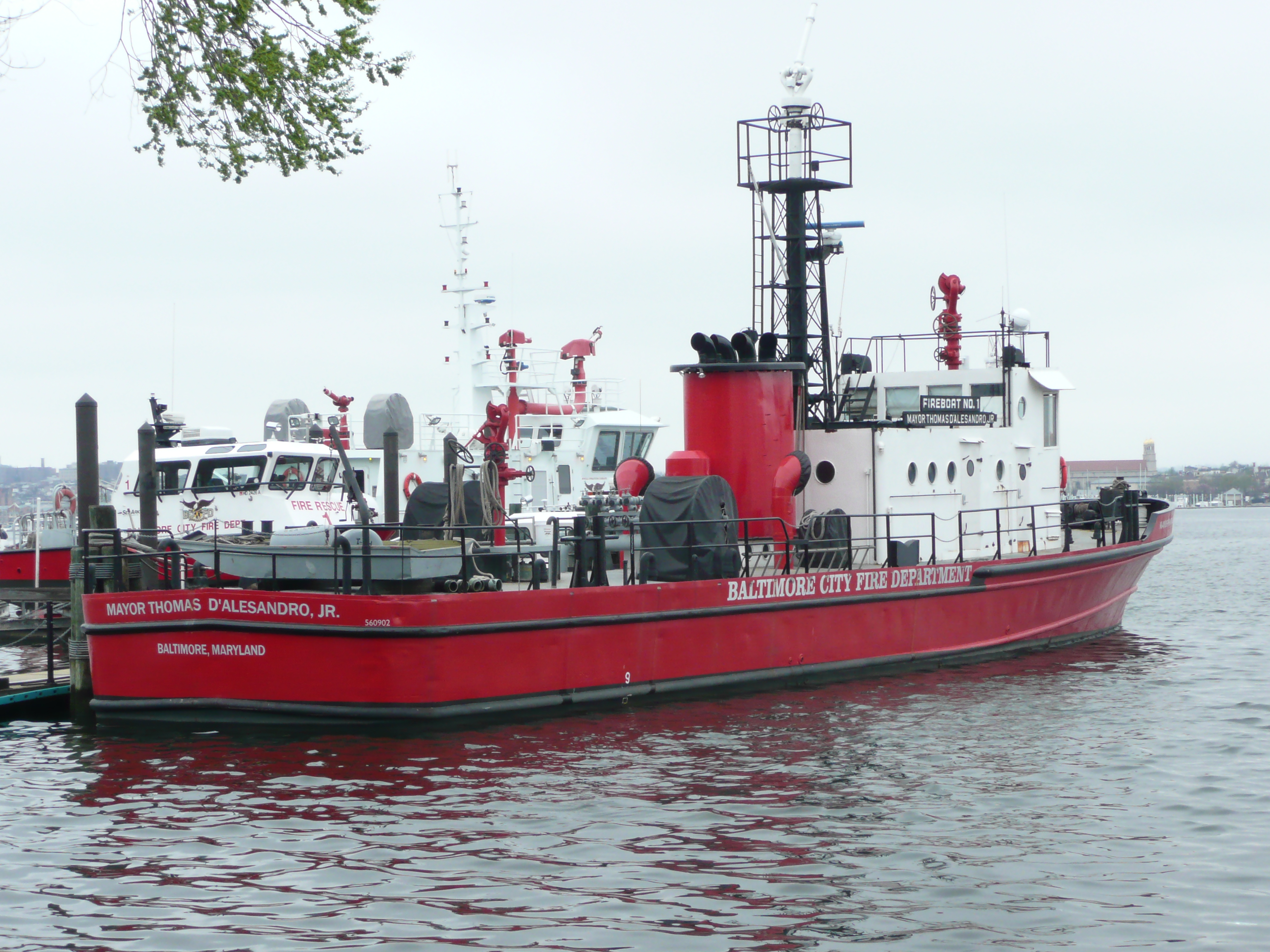

The Thomas d'Alesandro Jr. was Baltimore, Maryland's first diesel fireboat. She operated from 1956 to 2007. She was able to pump 12,000 gallons per minute.

After her 2007 retirement she sat in a scrapyard, but, in 2020, the decision was made to cannibalize her wheelhouse and deckhouse, and turn them into a museum exhibit.
