= Fleet Week (Portland, Oregon) =

Annual event in Portland, Oregon, U.S.

- Logo

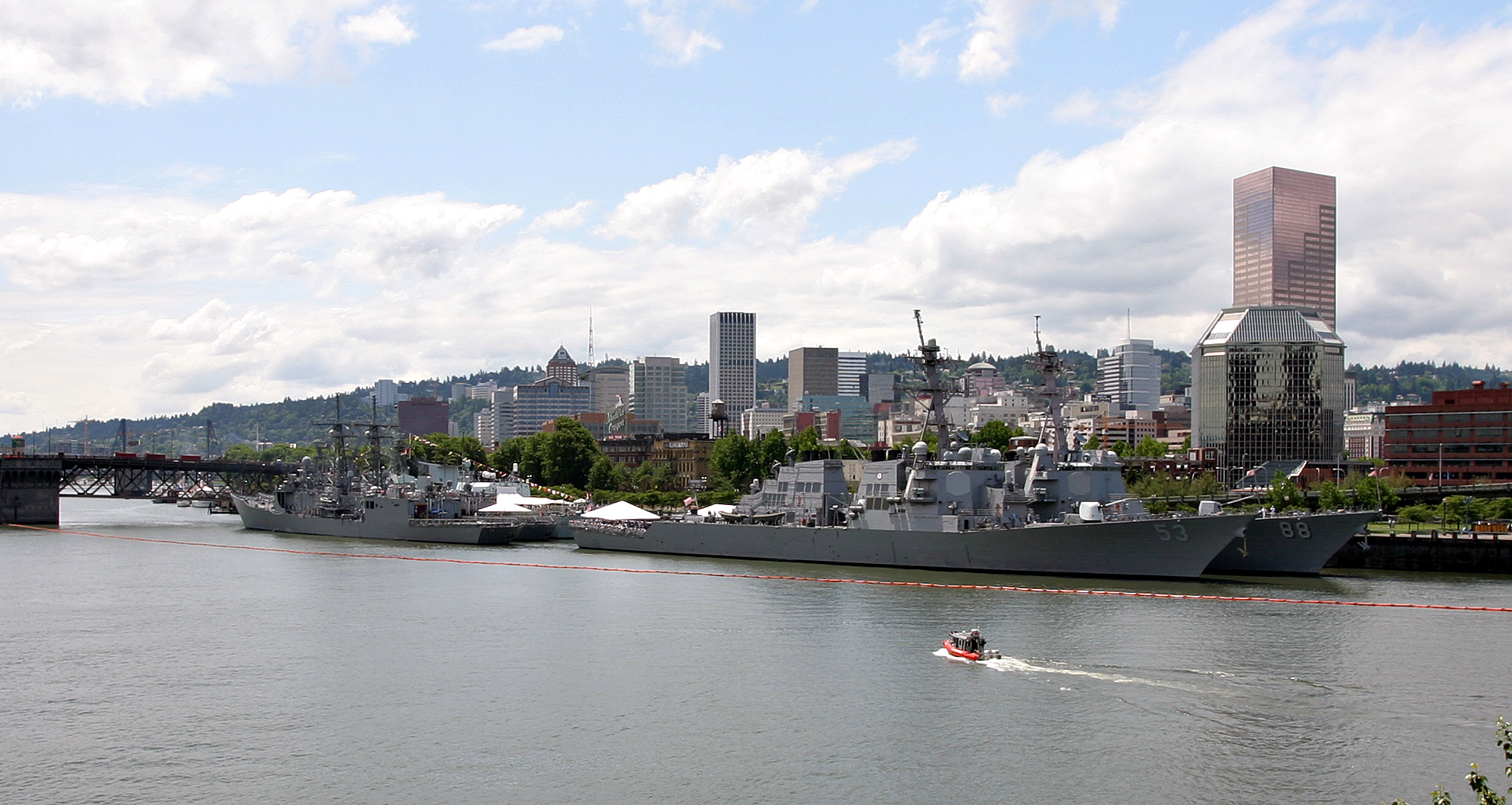
- Several U.S. Navy warships docked along Tom McCall Waterfront Park during the Portland Rose Festival, 2026
- Status: Active
- Frequency: Annually
- Location: Portland, Oregon
- Country: United States
- Inaugurated: 1907

Fleet Week is an annual Fleet Week in Portland, Oregon, United States. The city has hosted ships since 1907. Part of the Portland Rose Festival, it is the nation's longest running Fleet Week. It has hosted ships from the U.S. Navy, the U.S. Coast Guard, and the Royal Canadian Navy.

== History ==
=== 1936 ===
1936 was the first Fleet Week for Portland, although navy ships had visited Portland previously starting in 1892 as part of civic celebrations. Ships included:

- USS Houston (CA-30)
- USS Milwaukee (CL-5)
- USS Chester (CL-27)
- USS Chicago (CL-29)
- USS Aylwyn (DD-355)
- USS Bainbridge (DD-246)
- USS Chandler (DD-206)
- USS Detroit (CL-8)
- USS Farragut (DD-348)
- USS Goff (DD-247)
- USS Hovey (DD-208)
- USS Hull (DD-350)
- USS Litchfield (DD-336)
- USS Long (DD-209)
- USS Monaghan (DD-354)
- USS Sturdevant (DD-240)
- USS Southard (DD-207)
- USS Worden (DD-352)
- USS Relief (AH-1)

=== 1937 ===
Ships included:

- USS Astoria (CA-34)
- USS Chicago (CL-29)
- USS Indianapolis (CA-35)
- USS Louisville (CA-28)
- USS Memphis (CL-13)
- USS Minneapolis (CL-36)
- USS New Orleans (CL-32)
- USS Northampton (CL-26)
- USS Pensacola (CL-24)
- USS Quincy (CA-39)
- USS Richmond (CL-9)
- USS Trenton (CL-11)
- USS Tuscaloosa (CA-37)
- USS Salt Lake City (CL-25)
- USS Pensacola (CL-24)
- USS Brooks (DD-232)
- USS Fox (DD-234)
- USS Goff (DD-247)
- USS Marblehead (CL-12)
- USS Reuben James (DD-245)
- USS Relief (AH-1)
- USS Arctic (AF-7)

=== 1938 ===
Ships included:

- USS Chester (CL-27)
- USS Chicago (CL-29)
- USS Indianapolis (CA-35)
- USS Northampton (CL-26)
- USS Pensacola (CL-24)
- USS Salt Lake City (CL-25)
- USS Tuscaloosa (CA-37)
- USS Vincennes (CA-44)
- USS Alywin (DD-355)
- USS Dale (DD-353)
- USS Dewey (DD-349)
- USS Farragut (DD-348)
- USS Hull (DD-350)
- USS Phelps (DD-360)
- USS MacDonough (DD-331)
- USS Monaghan (DD-354)
- USS Worden (DD-352)
- USS Relief (AH-1)
- USS Arctic (AF-7)
- USS Medusa (AR-1)

=== 1990 ===
Ships included:

- USS Mobile (LKA-115)
- USS Kiska (T-AE-35)
- USS Sentry (MCM-3)
- USS Pledge (MSO-492)
- USS Implicit (AM-455)
- USS Gallant (MSO-489)
- USS Excel (AM-439)
- USS New Jersey (BB-62)
- USS Harry W. Hill (DD-986)
- USS Cook (FF-1083)
- USS Francis Hammond (DE/FF-1067)
- USS George Philip (FFG-12)
- USS Peoria (LST-1183)
- USCGC Iris (WLB-395)
- USCGC Sherman (WHEC-720)
- USCGC Active (WMEC-618)
- USCGC Orcas (WPB-1327)
- USCGC Fir (WLM-212)
- USCGC Blackhaw (WLB-390)
- USCGC Bluebell (WLI-313)
- HMCS Saskatchewan (DDE 262)
- HMCS Qu'Appelle (DDE 264)
- HMCS Mackenzie (DDE 261)
- HMCS Yukon (DDE 263)
- HMCS Chaleur (MCB 164)
- HMCS Miramichi (MCB 163)
- HMCS Cowichan (MCB 162)
- HMCS Thunder (MCB 161)

=== 2011 ===
Ships included:

- USS Lake Champlain (CG-57)
- USS Ingraham (FFG-61)
- USS McClusky (FFG-41)
- USCGC Active (WMEC-618)
- USCGC Fir (WLB-213)
- USCGC Bluebell (WLI-313)
- USCGC Henry Blake (WLM-563)
- ACOE Redlinger
- ACOE Essaysons
- HMCS Saskatoon (MM 709)
- HMCS Whitehorse (MM 705)

=== 2012 ===
Ships included:

- USS Dewey (DDG-105)
- USS William P. Lawrence (DDG-110)
- USS Ingraham (FFG-61)

=== 2013 ===
For 2013 all Fleet Weeks were canceled due to budget issues

=== 2014 ===
Ships included:

- USS Lake Champlain (CG-57)
- USS Spruance (DDG-111)
- USCGC Alert (WMEC-630)
- USCGC CuttyHunk (WPB-1322)
- HMCS Oriole (KC 480)

=== 2015 ===
Ships included:

- USS Chosin (CG-65)
- USS Cape St. George (CG-71)
- USS Champion (MCM-4)
- USCGC Waesche (WMSL-751)
- USCGC Wahoo (87345)
- USCGC Bluebell (WLI-313)
- USCGC Henry Blake (WLM-563)
- HMCS Calgary (FFH 335)
- HMCS Whitehorse (MM 705)
- HMCS Saskatoon (MM 709)
- HMCS Oriole (KC 480)

=== 2016 ===
Ships included:

- USS Russell (DDG-59)
- USS Howard (DDG-83)
- USS Champion (MCM-4)
- USCGC Steadfast (WMEC-623)
- USCGC Swordfish (WPB-87358)
- USCGC Fir (WLB-213)
- USCGC Bluebell (WLI-313)
- HMCS Brandon (MM 710)
- HMCS Edmonton (MM 703)

=== 2017 ===
Ships included:

- USS Bunker Hill (CG-52)
- USS Jackson (LCS-6)
- USCGC Alert (WMEC-630)
- USCGC Orcas (WPB-1327)
- USCGC Bluebell (WLI-313)
- USCGC Ironwood (WLB-297)
- HMCS Brandon (MM 710)
- HMCS Edmonton (MM 703)

=== 2018 ===
Ships included:

- USS Michael Murphy (DDG-112)
- USS Scout (MCM-8)
- USCGC Steadfast (WMEC-623)
- USCGC Bluebell (WLI-313)
- USCGC Orcas (WPB-1327)
- USCGC Ironwood (WLB-297) – Decommissioned 2001, in service as a training ship since
- HMCS Regina (FFH 334)
- HMCS Nanaimo (MM 702)

=== 2019 ===
Ships included:

- USS Pinckney (DDG-91)
- USS Independence (LCS-2)
- USCGC Steadfast (WMEC-623)
- USCGC Swordfish (WPB-87358)
- USCGC Bluebell (WLI-313)
- USCGC Ironwood (WLB-297) – Decommissioned 2001, in service as a training ship since
- HMCS Edmonton (MM 703)
- HMCS Nanaimo (MM 702)

=== 2022 ===
Ships included:

- USS Michael Monsoor (DDG-1001)
- USS Coronado (LCS-4)
- USCGC Terrapin (WPB-87366)
- USCGC Bluebell (WLI-313)
- USCGC Elm (WLB-204)
- HMCS Brandon (MM 710)
- HMCS Edmonton (MM 703)

=== 2023 ===
- USS Kansas City (LCS-22)
- USS John S. McCain (DDG-56)
- USCGC Elm (WLB-204)
- USCGC Bluebell (WLI-313)
- USCGC Bailey T. Barco (WPC-1122)
- USCGC Orcas (WPB-1327)
- HMCS Nanaimo (MM 702)
- HMCS Yellowknife (MM 706)
- HMCS Edmonton (MM 703)
- USACE Redlinger

=== 2024 ===
- USS Montgomery (LCS-8)
- USCGC John McCormick (WPC-1121)
- USCGC Bluebell (WLI-313)
- HMCS Edmonton (MM 703)
- HMCS Yellowknife (MM 706)
- USACE Redlinger

=== 2025 ===
- USS Jack H. Lucas (DDG-125)
- USS Mustin (DDG-89)
- USCGC Eagle (WIX-327)
- USCGC Bluebell (WLI-313)
- USCGC Blue Shark (WPB-87360)
- USCGC Henry Blake (WLM-563)
- HMCS Nanaimo (MM 702)
- USACE Redlinger

== See also ==
- Culture of Portland, Oregon
