= Henry Blake =

Henry Blake may refer to:

- Sir Henry Arthur Blake (1840–1918), British colonial administrator and Governor of Hong Kong
- Henry Blake (baseball) (1874–1919), American baseball player
- Henry Blake (lighthouse keeper) (1837–1871), American lighthouse keeper
- Sir Henry Charles Blake, 4th Baronet (1794–1880), of the Blake baronets
- Henry N. Blake (1838–1935), first chief justice of the Montana Supreme Court after statehood

== Fictional characters ==
- Henry Blake (M*A*S*H), a character in the television series M*A*S*H

== See also ==
- Harry Blake (disambiguation)
