= Harry Blake (disambiguation) =

Harry Blake (1874–1919) was an American outfielder in Major League Baseball.

Harry Blake may also refer to:

- Henry Blake (lighthouse keeper) (1837–1871), first New Dungeness Lighthouse keeper
- Henry Arthur Blake (1840–1918), British colonial administrator, Governor-General of Hong Kong
- Harry Blake (television personality) (born c. 1988), participant in Big Brother
- Harry Blake, alias of Billy Jones (1889–1940), American tenor
- Harry Blake, character in Naughty Marietta

== See also ==
- Harold Blake, see New York's 33rd congressional district
- Henry Blake (disambiguation)
