= Starlight Parade =

Annual parade in Portland, Oregon, U.S.

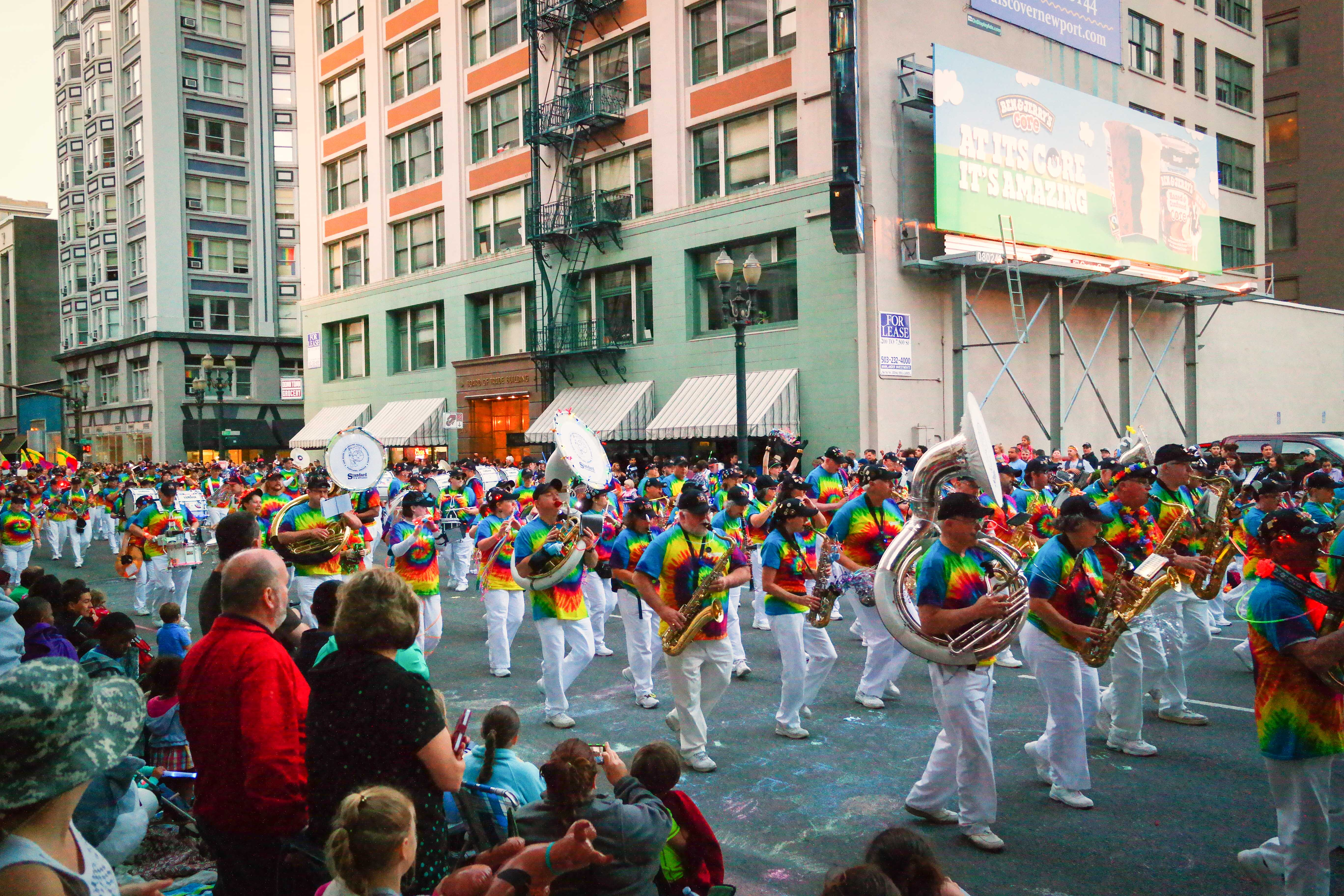
- Frequency: Annually
- Locations: Portland, Oregon, U.S.

The Starlight Parade is an annual parade held in Portland, Oregon, in the United States, as part of the Portland Rose Festival. The 2017 and 2019 events saw approximately 300,000 spectators.

== See also ==
- Culture of Portland, Oregon
