= USCGC Henry Blake =

US Coast Guard buoy tender

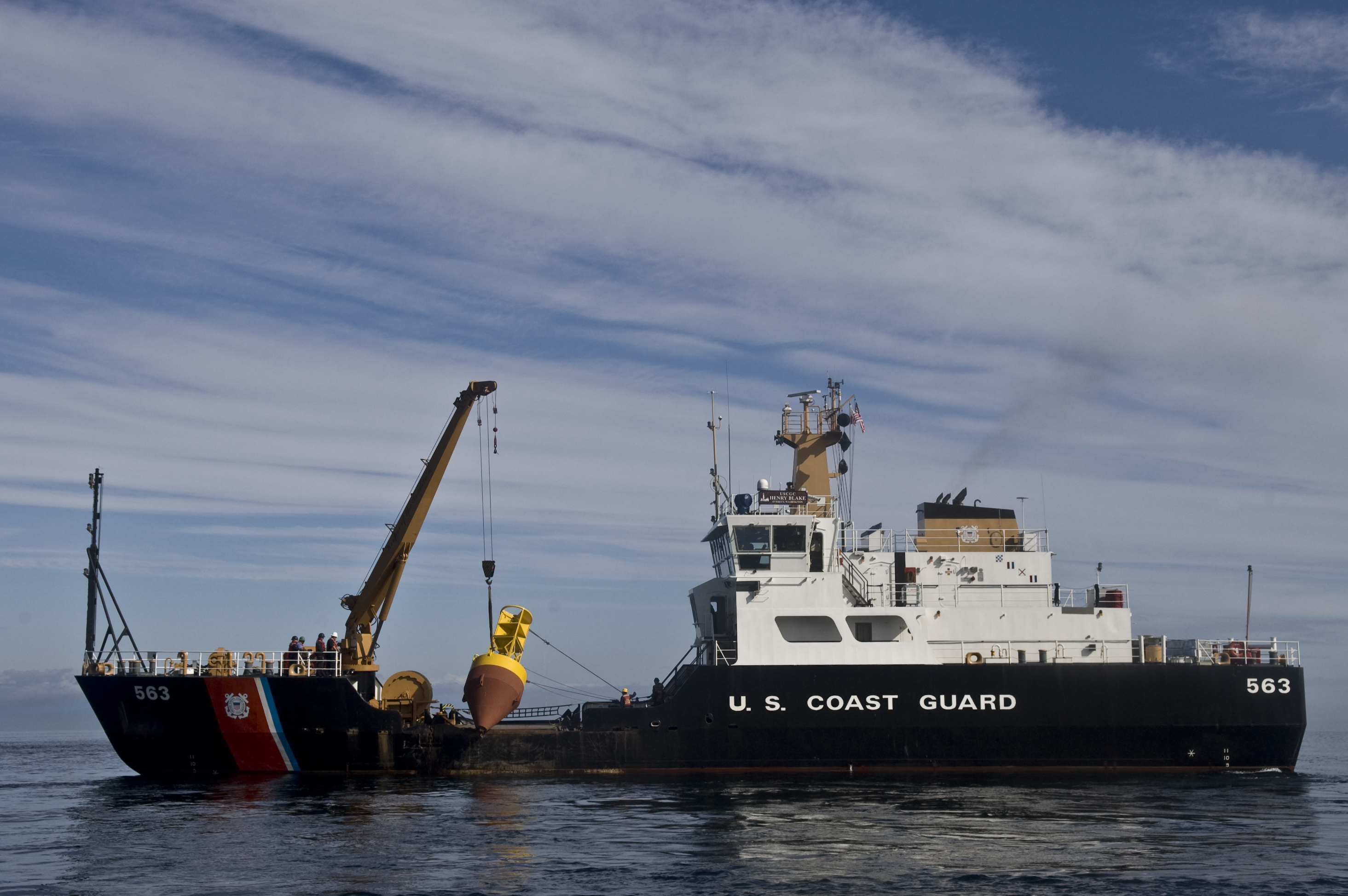
- USCGC Henry Blake works a Canadian buoy during exercise Pacific Unity 2009

History

United States
- Name: USCGC Henry Blake (WLM-563)
- Namesake: Henry Blake
- Builder: Marinette Marine
- Launched: 20 November 1999
- Commissioned: 27 October 2000
- Home port: Everett, Washington
- Identification: IMO number: 9177313; MMSI number: 338922000; Callsign: NTVT
- Motto: “Keeper of the Tradition”
- Status: Active in service
- Badge

General characteristics
- Class & type: Keeper-class cutter
- Displacement: 850 Long Tons
- Length: 175 ft (53 m)
- Beam: 36 ft (11 m)
- Draft: 8 ft (2.4 m)
- Propulsion: 2 × Caterpillar 3508 DITA Diesel engines; bow thruster, 500 hp (373 kW)
- Speed: 12 knots
- Range: 2000 nautical miles at 10 knots
- Crew: 22 enlisted, 2 officers

USCGC Henry Blake (WLM-563) is a United States Coast Guard Keeper-class cutter based at Naval Station Everett in Everett, WA. Henry Blake's primary mission is the maintenance of 80 lighted, 39 unlighted, and 65 shore-based aids to navigation in the Puget Sound area and along the coast of Washington. Secondary missions include marine environmental protection, search and rescue, and homeland security. Henry Blake is assigned to the Thirteenth Coast Guard District.

== Construction and characteristics ==
On 22 June 1993 the Coast Guard awarded the contract for the Keeper-class vessels in the form of a firm contract for the lead ship and options for thirteen more. The Coast Guard exercised options for the final four, including Henry Blake, in September 1997. She was built by Marinette Marine Corporation at its shipyard in Marinette, Wisconsin. Construction began in 1998 and she was launched on 20 November 1999. She is the thirteenth of the fourteen Keeper-class vessels completed.

The Coast Guard accepted the ship and she was placed in "in commission, special" status on 18 May 2000. She sailed from Marinette to her base in Everett, stopping in four countries and eleven states, finally reaching her new home on 14 September 2000. The ship was placed in "in commission, full" status at a ceremony at Naval Station Everett on 27 October 2000.

Her hull was built of welded steel plates. She is 175 feet (53 m) long, with a beam of 36 feet (11 m), and a full-load draft of 8 feet (2.4 m). Henry Blake displaces 850 long tons fully loaded. Her gross register tonnage is 904, and her net register tonnage is 271. The top of the mast is 58.75 feet (17.91 m) above the waterline.

Rather than building the ship from the keel up as a single unit, Marinette Marine used a modular fabrication approach. Eight large modules, or "hull blocks" were built separately and then welded together.

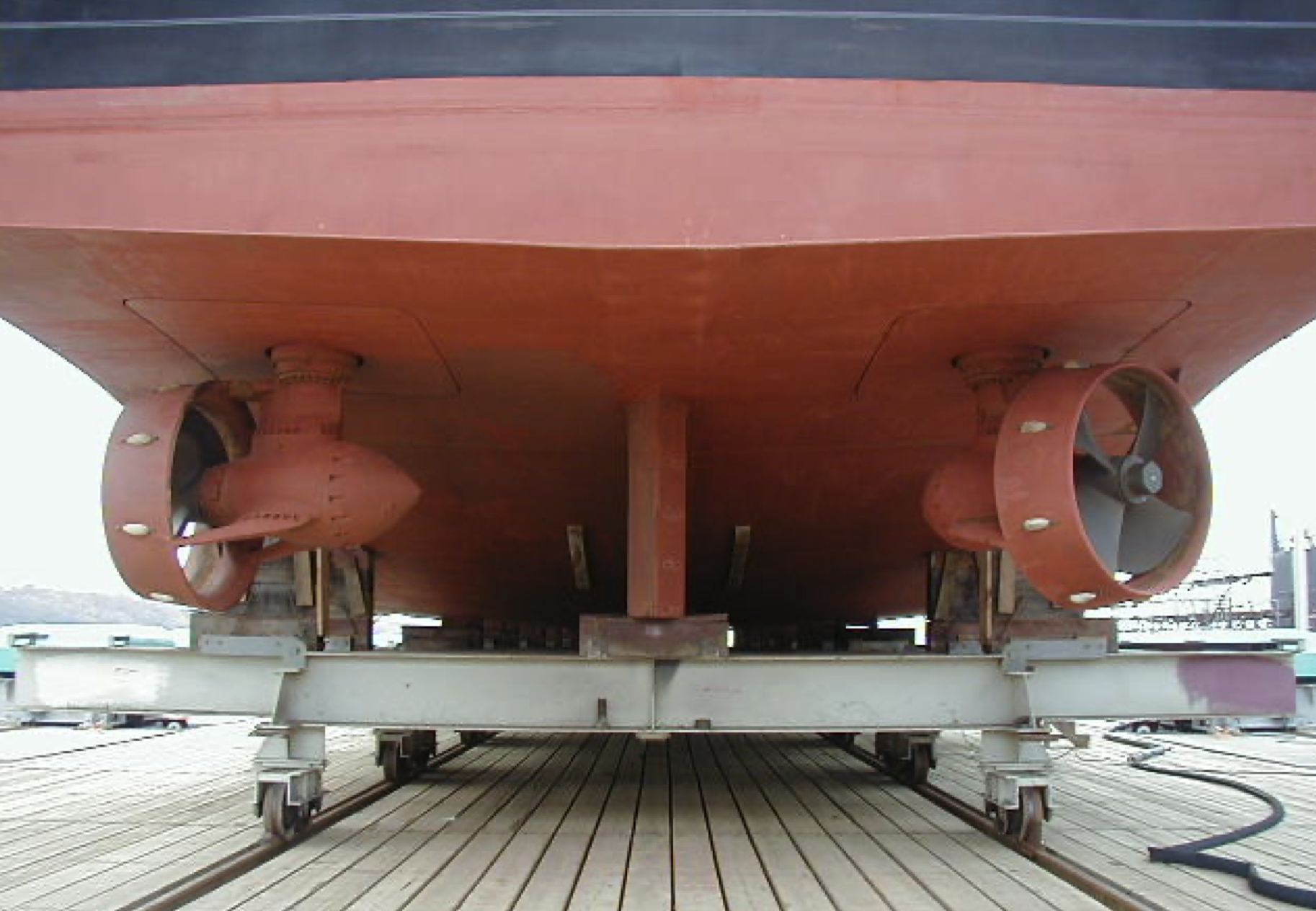
Z-drives on a Keeper-class ship

The ship has two Caterpillar 3508 DITA (direct-injection, turbocharged, aftercooled) 8-cylinder Diesel engines which produce 1000 horsepower each. These drive two Ulstein Z-drives. Keeper-class ships were the first Coast Guard cutters equipped with Z-drives, which markedly improved their maneuverability. The Z-drives have four-bladed propellers which are 57.1 inches (145 cm) in diameter and are equipped with Kort nozzles. They can be operated in "tiller mode" where the Z-drives turn in the same direction to steer the ship, or in "Z-conn mode" where the two Z-drives can turn in different directions to achieve specific maneuvering objectives. An implication of the Z-drives is that there is no reverse gear or rudder aboard Henry Blake. In order to back the ship, the Z-drives are turned 180 degrees, which drives the ship stern-first even though the propellers are spinning in the same direction as they do when the ship is moving forward. Her maximum speed is 12 knots. Her tanks can hold 16,385 gallons of diesel fuel which gives her an unrefueled range of 2,000 nautical miles at 10 knots.

She has a 500-horsepower bow thruster. The Z-drives and bow thruster can be linked in a Dynamic Positioning System. This gives Henry Blake the ability to hold position in the water even in heavy currents, winds, and swells. This advanced capability is useful in bringing buoys aboard that can weigh more than 16,000 lbs.

Electrical power aboard is provided by three Caterpillar 3406 DITA generators which produce 285 Kw each. She also has a 210 Kw emergency generator, which is a Caterpillar 3406 DIT.

The buoy deck has 1,335 square feet (124.0 m^{2}) of working area. A crane with a boom 42 feet (13 m) long lifts buoys and their mooring anchors onto the deck. The crane can lift up to 20,000 pounds (9,100 kg).

The ships' fresh water tanks can hold 7,339 gallons. She also has three ballast tanks that can be filled to maintain trim, and tanks for oily waste water, sewage, gray water, new lubrication oil, and waste oil.

Accommodations were designed for mixed gender crews from the start. Crew size and composition has varied over the years. In 2000, Henry Blake had a crew of 2 officers and 18 enlisted people. In addition, there were 8 land-based personnel in a cutter support team who augmented the sea-going portion of the crew. The payroll for the 28 active-duty personnel assigned to the ship was $840,000.

Henry Blake, as all Keeper-class ships, has a strengthened "ice belt" along the waterline so that she can work on aids to navigation in ice-infested waters. Not only is the hull plating in the ice belt thicker than the rest of the hull, but framing members are closer together in areas that experience greater loads when working in ice. Higher grades of steel were used for hull plating in the ice belt to prevent cracking in cold temperatures. Her bow is sloped so that rather than smashing into ice, she ride up over it and break it with the weight of the ship. Henry Blake is capable of breaking flat, 9-inch thick ice at 3 knots.

The ship carries a cutter boat on davits. She was originally equipped with a CB-M boat which was replaced in the mid-2010s with a CB-ATON-M boat. This was built by Metal Shark Aluminum Boats and was estimated to cost $210,000. The boat is 18 feet (5.5 m) long and are equipped with a Mercury Marine inboard/outboard diesel engine.

All 14 Keeper-class cutters are named after lighthouse keepers. Henry Blake's namesake is Henry Blake, the first keeper of the New Dungeness Lighthouse near Port Angeles, Washington. As she tends aids to navigation in her namesake's former area of responsibility, Henry Blake's motto is "Keeper of the Tradition."

Henry Blake replaced USCGC Mariposa, which was decommissioned on 31 October 2000.

== Service history ==
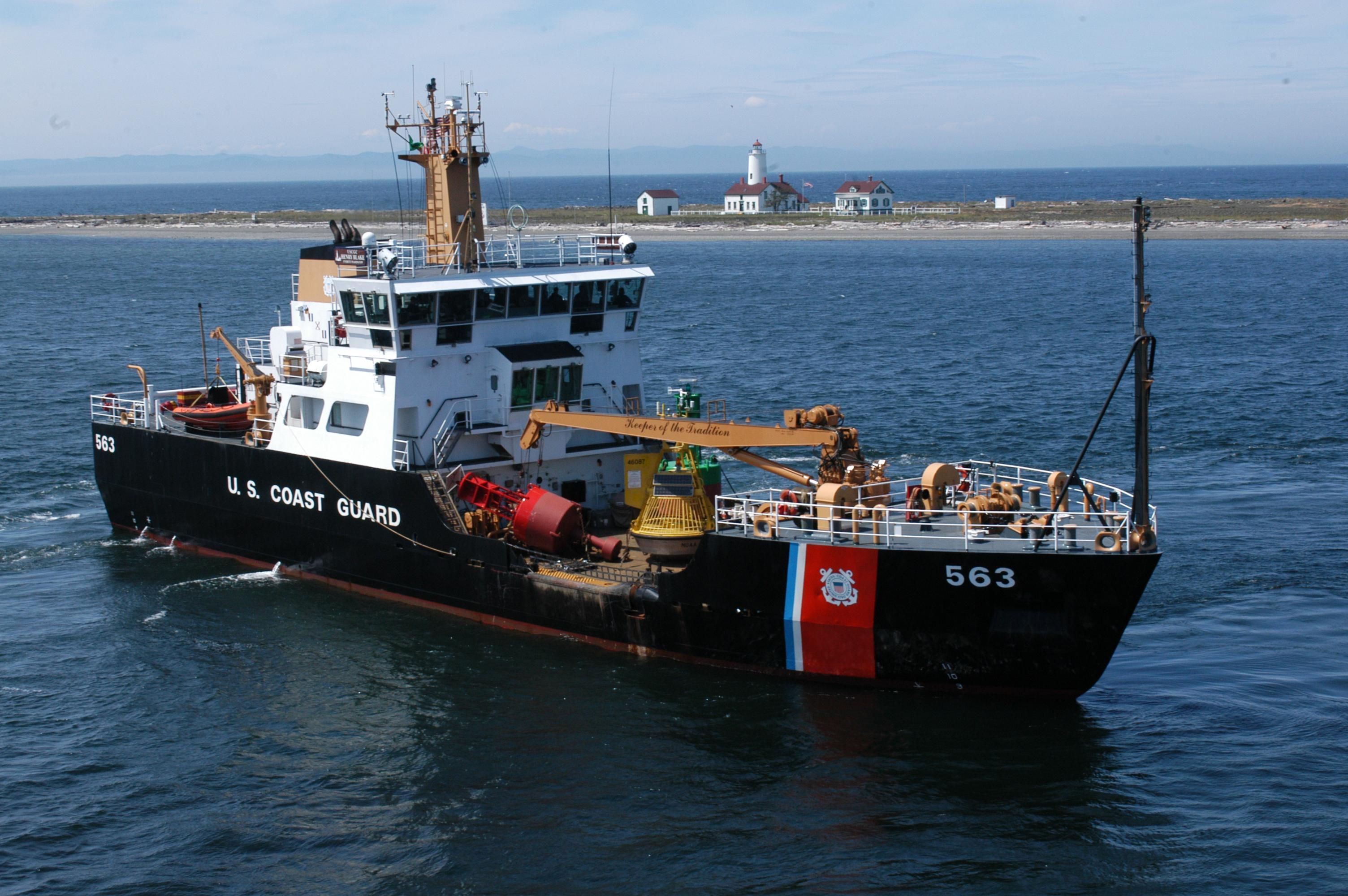
Henry Blake before the New Dungeness Lighthouse where her namesake was keeper

Henry Blake's buoy tending involves lifting them onto her deck where marine growth is scraped and pressure washed off, inspecting the buoy itself, and replacing lights, solar cells, and radar transponders. The mooring chain or synthetic cable is inspected and replaced as needed. The concrete block mooring anchor is also inspected. Despite the routine maintenance, buoys occasionally part their mooring lines and float away. Henry Blake recovers these and replaces them where they belong.

The bulk of Henry Blake's year is spent at sea tending its buoys, or in port maintaining the ship. She has been asked to perform other missions, as described below.

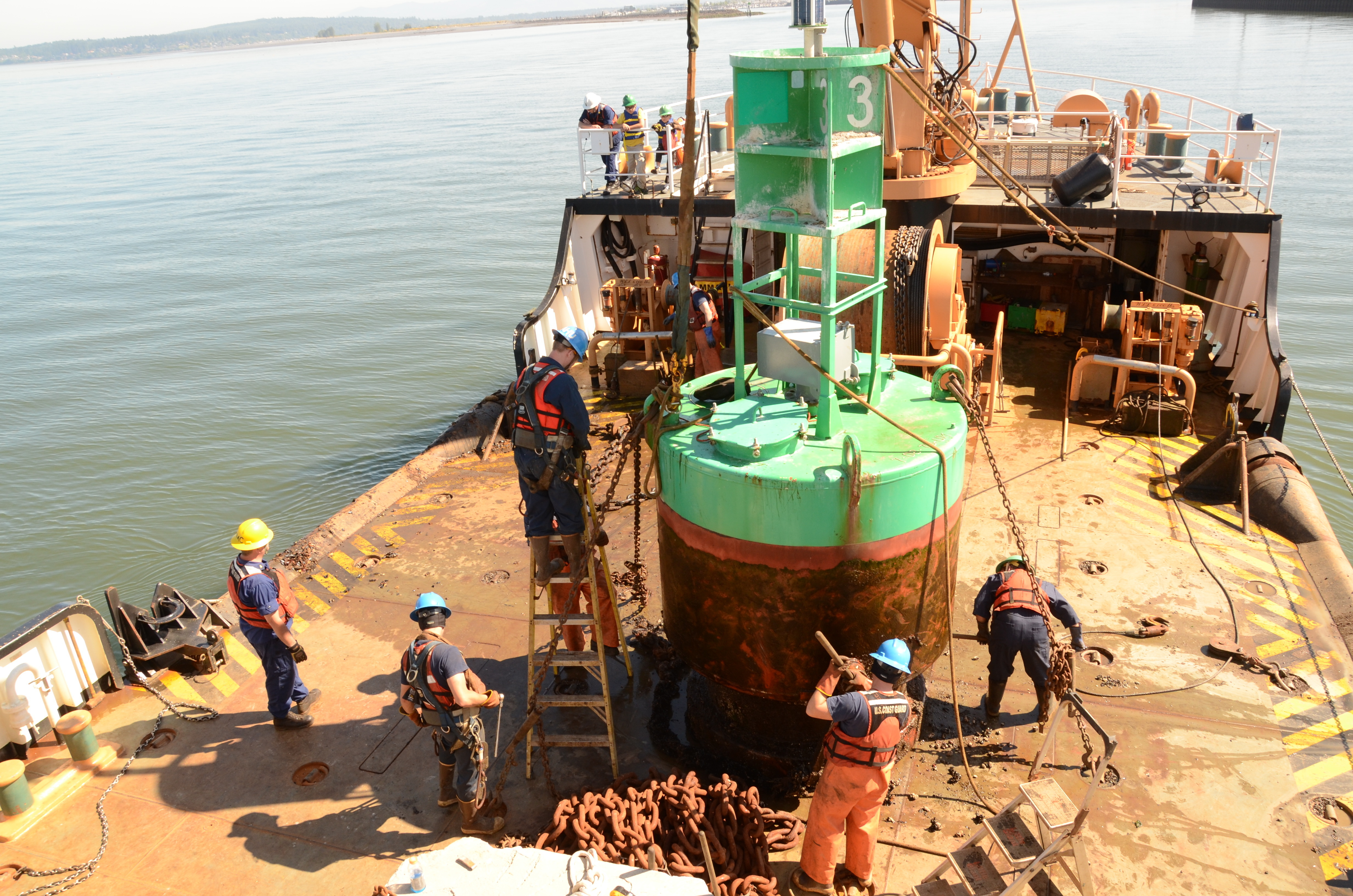
Henry Blake servicing a buoy in Puget Sound

=== Search and rescue operations ===
In June 2012 a yacht with four people aboard was reported on fire 20 miles northwest of Grays Harbor, Washington. Henry Blake, another Coast Guard vessel, and a helicopter were dispatched to render assistance. The yacht sank, but the three people aboard were rescued by a nearby fishing vessel.

On 26 January 2015, a small plane crashed in Hood Canal, Washington. The Coast Guard dispatched two ships, one of which was Henry Blake, and a helicopter to search for survivors. None were found.

On the morning of 30 September 2016 a Kenmore Air floatplane crashed into the sea near the south end of Lopez Island, Washington. Henry Blake was dispatched to the scene. The four people aboard the plane were rescued by another vessel.

=== Environmental protection ===
In August 2009, the ship participated in the clean-up of the Tatoosh Island lighthouse, which had been automated in 1977. Old generators, a fuel tank, and nine pallets of miscellaneous gear were lifted off the island by an HH-60 Jayhawk helicopter and set down on Henry Blake's buoy deck so they could be hauled away.

In August 2022, Henry Blake was dispatched to the west side of San Juan Island where the fishing boat Aleutian Isle had recently sunk. The wreck was resting on the bottom below 200 feet (61 m) deep. Nets from the vessel floated around the wreck, a hazard to both wildlife and the salvage operations which attempted to prevent a fuel spill. Using her crane, Henry Blake was able to recover over 1,400 feet (430 m) of nets from the wreck site.

=== Biofuel experiment ===
In 2012, Henry Blake became the first Coast Guard vessel to operate on a biofuel mix. The ship was loaded with a 50/50 mix of conventional F-76 military diesel fuel and hydro-processed renewable diesel, an algae-derived fuel oil. Every tank on the ship was filled with the blend, and its test lasted the entire summer. The biofuel was obtained from the U.S. Navy which was also testing it on its own ships as part of its Great Green Fleet initiative.

=== Public engagement ===
The Coast Guard has offered public tours of Henry Blake on several occasions. These include:

- Green Bay, Wisconsin in June 2000, just after the ship was accepted by the Coast Guard.
- Seattle Fleet Week in 2022, 2023
- Seattle Maritime Festival in 2011
- Portland Rose Festival in 2005, 2006, 2008, 2009, 2011, 2012
- Naval Station Everett open house in 2009
