= Portland Rose Festival =

Annual festival in Portland, Oregon

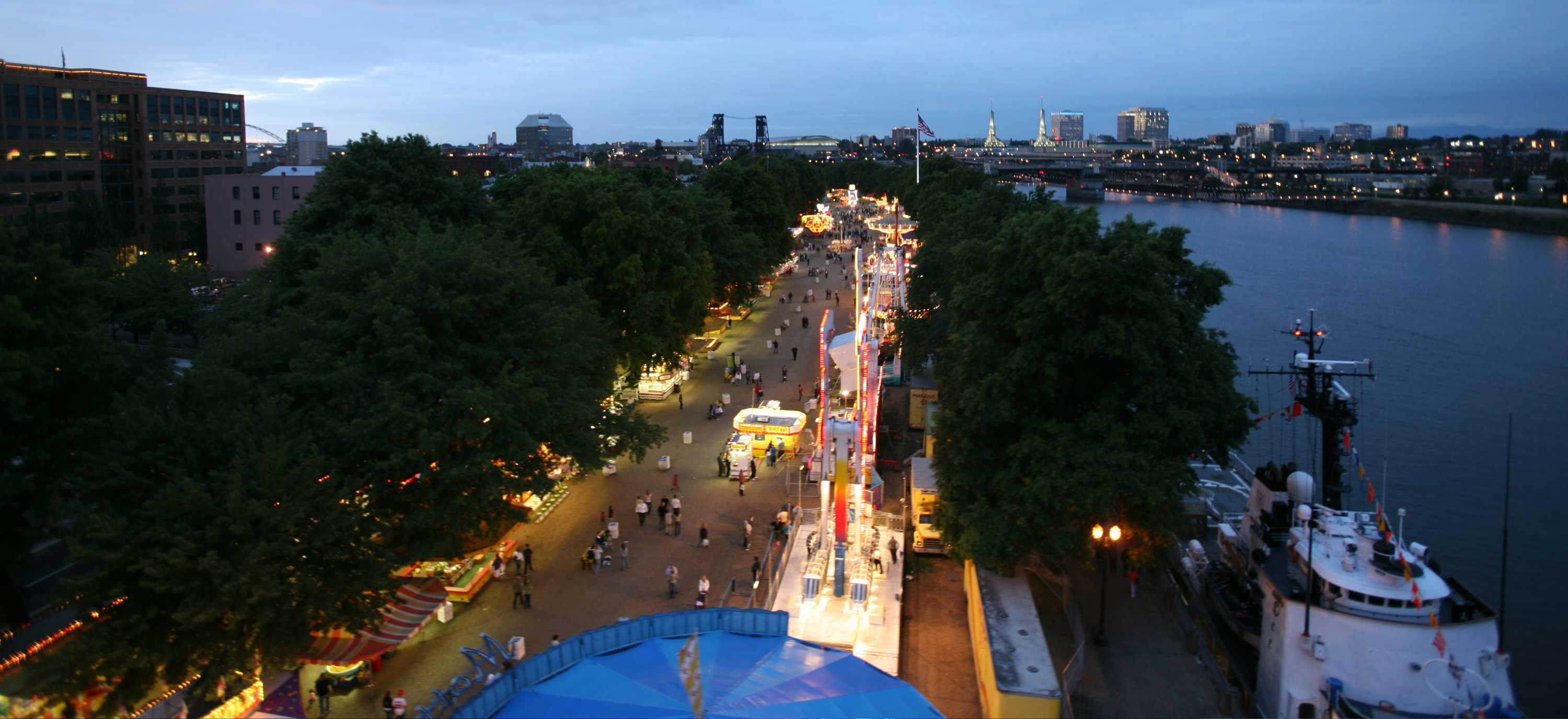
- The festival's Waterfront Village at Tom McCall Waterfront Park, 2007
- Begins: late May or early June
- Ends: mid-June (2–3 weeks after starting)
- Frequency: annual
- Location: Portland, Oregon
- Inaugurated: 1907; 119 years ago
- Attendance: 1.2 million (2011)
- Budget: $3,407,582 (2011)
- Patron: Portland Rose Festival Foundation
- Website: rosefestival.org

The Portland Rose Festival is an annual civic festival held during the month of June in Portland, Oregon. It is organized by the volunteer non-profit Portland Rose Festival Foundation (named the Portland Rose Festival Association until the 2000s) with the purpose of promoting the Portland region. It includes three separate parades, along with a number of other activities.

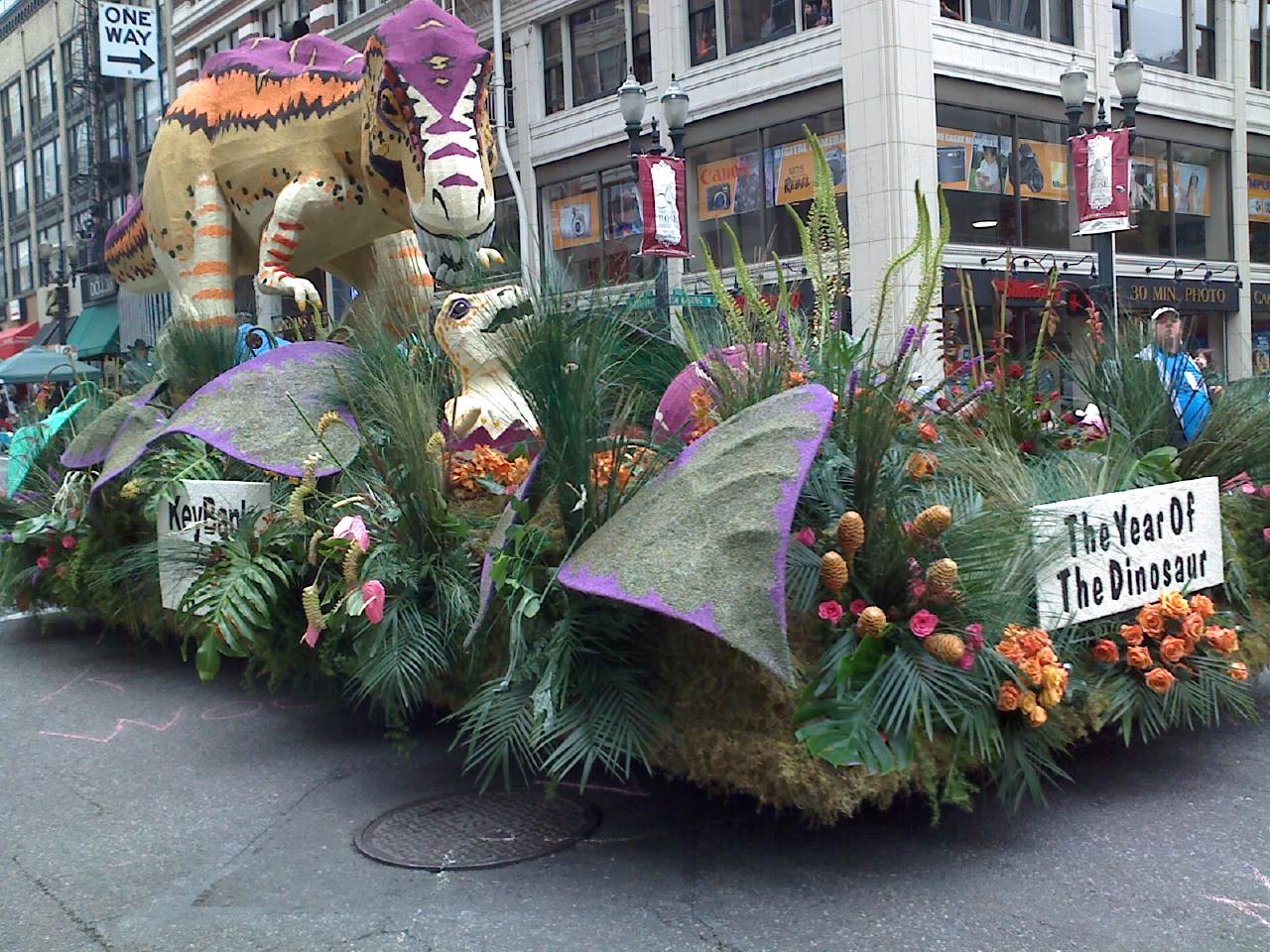
A dinosaur float in the 2008 Grand Floral Parade

== History ==
The Portland Rose Society, founded by Georgiana Pittock and friends in 1888, began with a backyard rose show in Pittock's garden. The annual fundraising event drew more crowds each year. By 1904, the rose society was hosting its annual rose show along with additional festivities, including a parade and pageant. In 1905, Portland Mayor Harry Lane is remembered for his rousing speech at the Lewis and Clark Exposition, telling the large crowd that Portland needed a "festival of roses". In 1906, the first Rose Festival and Flower Parade was held in Portland. Pittock and neighbors contributed roses from their gardens to decorate floats, wagons, people and horses for the parade. In 1907, the Portland Rose Festival Association was incorporated and Portland hosted its first official Portland Rose Festival.

The Grand Floral Parade is the centerpiece of the festival and the second largest all-floral parade in the United States after the Tournament of Roses Parade. More than 500,000 spectators line the route, making this flower parade the largest single-day spectator event in Oregon. The first parade, in 1907, was called the Rose Carnival, but eventually came to be known as the Rose Festival Parade and later still the Grand Floral Parade. The 1907 festival also included an "electric parade" with illuminated floats; this evolved into the Merrykhana Parade but after a two-season suspension was renamed the Starlight Parade in 1976.

Since 1930, a queen has been selected from a court of high school seniors from each school in the area. The members of the court are called princesses. For a brief period starting in 1997 they were officially called "ambassadors", but the term "princesses" was reinstated in January 2007. A college scholarship is awarded to a 14-member "royalty". Starting in 2009, the Rose Festival Foundation opened one place on the court to someone from a school outside the Portland city limits. There are drivers for the Princesses, who are chosen from each high school. The first African American driver (escort) was Sam Whitney from Benson High School in 1954. A Junior Rose Festival, focused on children, began unofficially in 1921, on the city's east side, and included its own parade and junior court. It became an official part of the Rose Festival in 1936. The festival's annual Junior Parade takes place in the city's Hollywood district. The Junior Parade has grown to an event involving nearly 10,000 children, making it the world's largest parade for children.

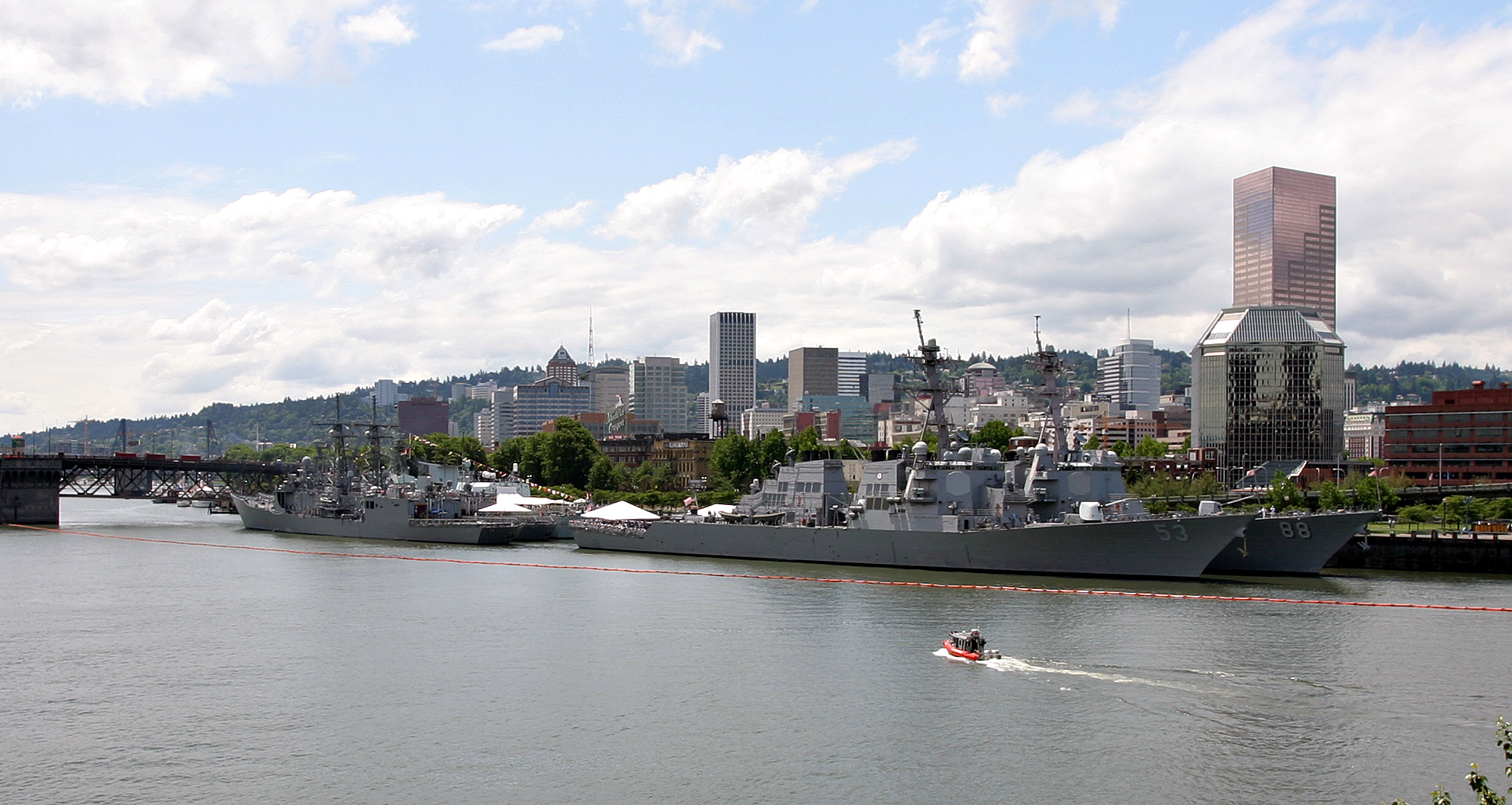
Fleet Week, 2006

During Fleet Week, ships from United States Navy, Coast Guard, Army Corps of Engineers and the Royal Canadian Navy dock along the seawall of Tom McCall Waterfront Park.

The festival also hosts the Starlight Parade, a fireworks display, and carnival rides along the Portland waterfront, among other events. Dragon boat races on the Willamette River have been included every year since 1989.

The Golden Rose Ski Classic is an annual ski race originating in 1936. It is the oldest known organized ski race in America, and is the only USSA-sanctioned summer race.

An air show was added to the Rose Festival in 1988 and remained part of the festival through 2002. Held at the Hillsboro Airport, it was named the Rose Festival Air Show, with the name generally preceded by a sponsor's name, but after the 2002 and 15th show the Rose Festival Association decided to discontinue its relationship with the event. In 2003, the show was reorganized as the Oregon International Air Show, with different sponsors and no longer a Rose Festival event.

No festival was held in 1917 and 1918 because of World War I or from 1942 through 1945 because of World War II. From 2007 to 2016, the festival began with the 82nd Avenue of Roses Parade. The parade was cancelled in 2017, but returned in 2018. COVID-19 pandemic concerns canceled the 2020 and 2021 parades, but the parade would return in 2022.

=== Road rage incident ===
Surveillance footage of the incident.

On June 10, 2023, 43-year-old Sidney Mecham drove his Chevrolet Avalanche through the parade in a road rage incident. Dashcam footage from his vehicle captured him on his mobile phone screaming about blocked exits, flipping off workers, and running over barricades. Although he swerved at parade goers, no one was injured. Mecham was arrested soon after evading police, and was indicted on 38 counts by a Multnomah County Grand Jury.

On October 1, 2024, Mecham pleaded guilty to two felony counts of unlawful use of a weapon as well as 16 misdemeanor counts of reckless endangerment and reckless driving. The other 20 charges were dismissed as part of a plea deal. He was sentenced to five years imprisonment. Mecham was a convicted sex offender and had previously been found guilty of multiple traffic violations. He addressed the court prior to sentencing, stating: "I caused fear to hundreds of children and their family, I acted on impulse. ... I’m truly sorry for the pain and fear that I’ve caused to the families and the City of Portland."

== One More Time Around Again Marching Band ==
The One More Time Around Again Marching Band (OMTAAMB) performs at the Starlight Parade and the Grand Floral Parade. Established in the 1980s, the group was inspired by the St. Petersburg Festival of States' Second Time Around Again Band. OMTAAMB include baton twirlers and dance troupes, and the band often plays "Louie Louie" by The Kingsmen. There were 560 members in 1996. In 2010, part of the ensemble performed at City Hall after City Council named the Rose Festival the city's "official" festival.

== Awards ==
- 2007, 2011: the International Festivals and Events Association named the Portland Rose Festival the best in the world
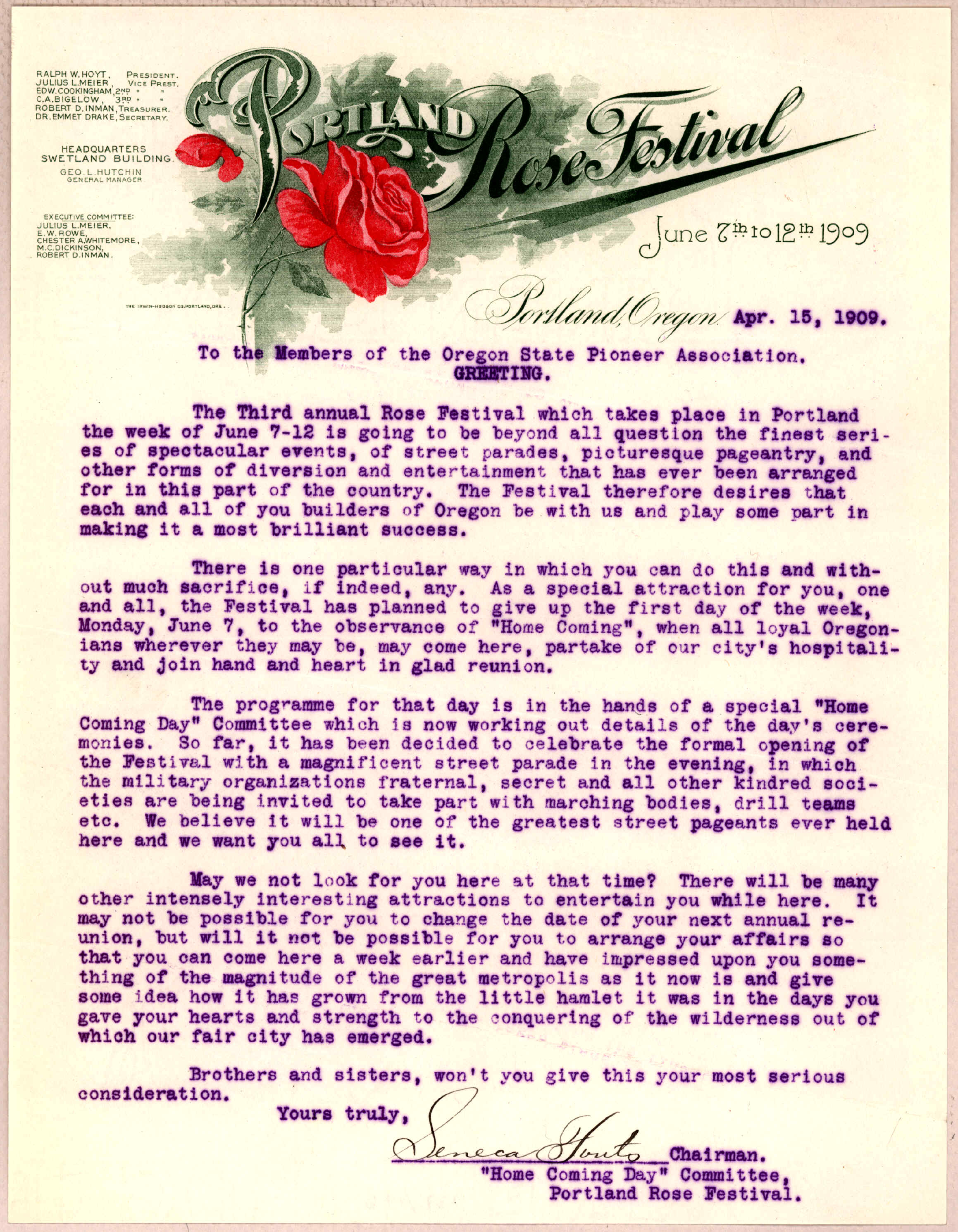
1909 Rose Festival letter

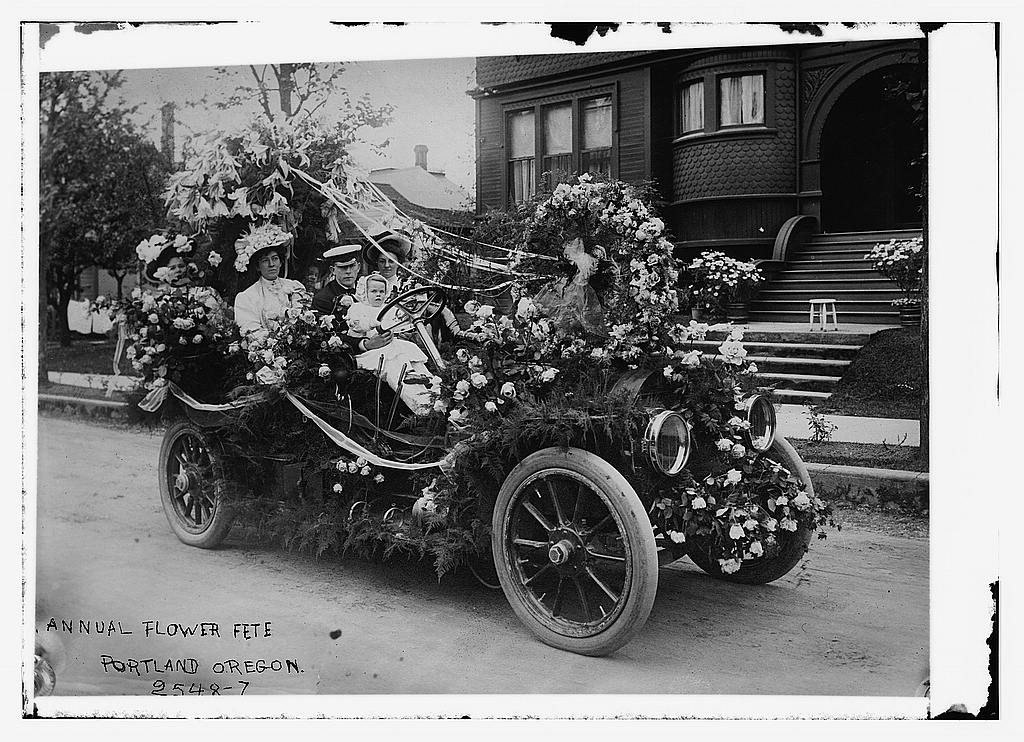
Circa 1912-1914

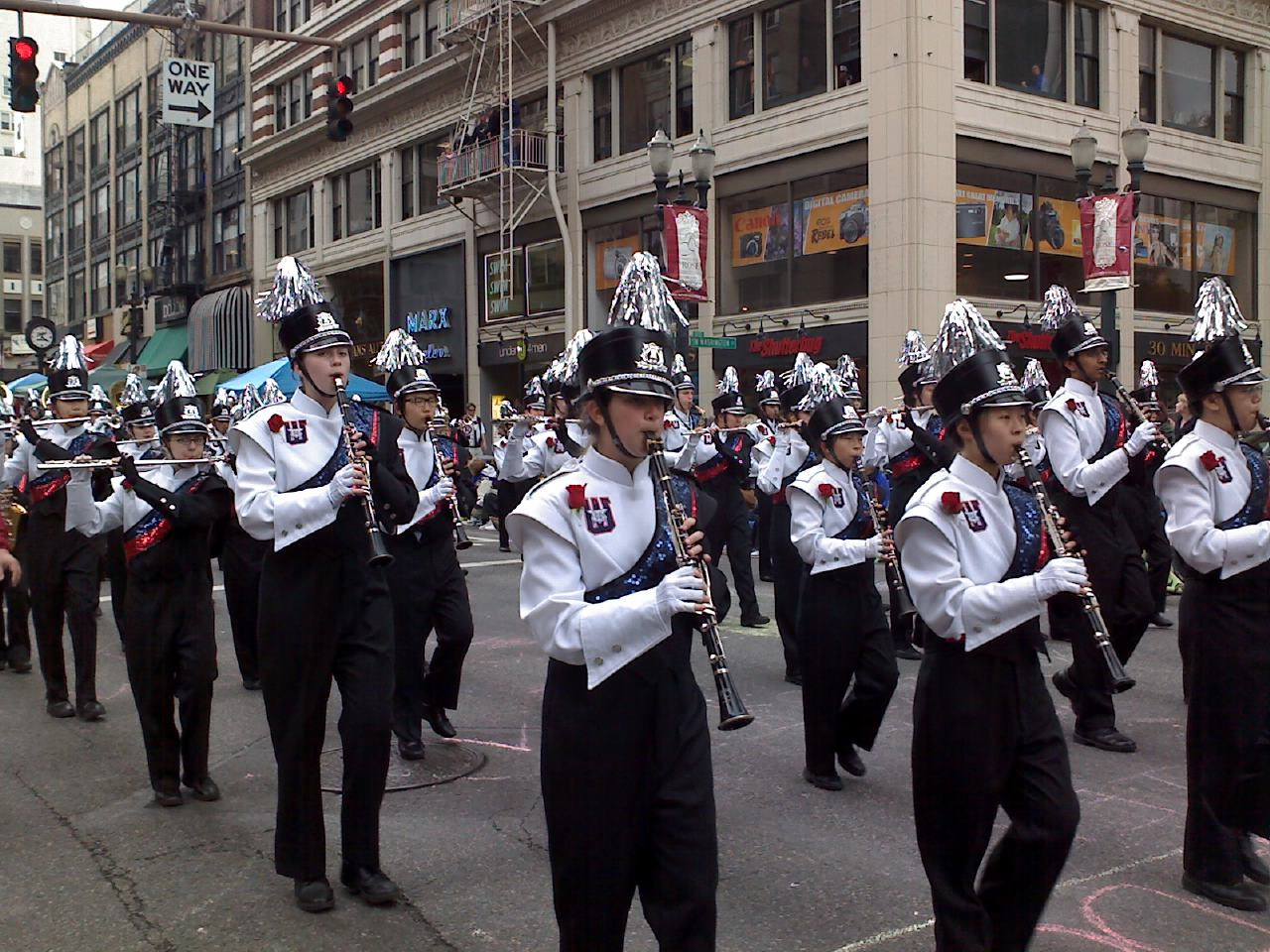
Every Rose Festival parade includes several marching bands.

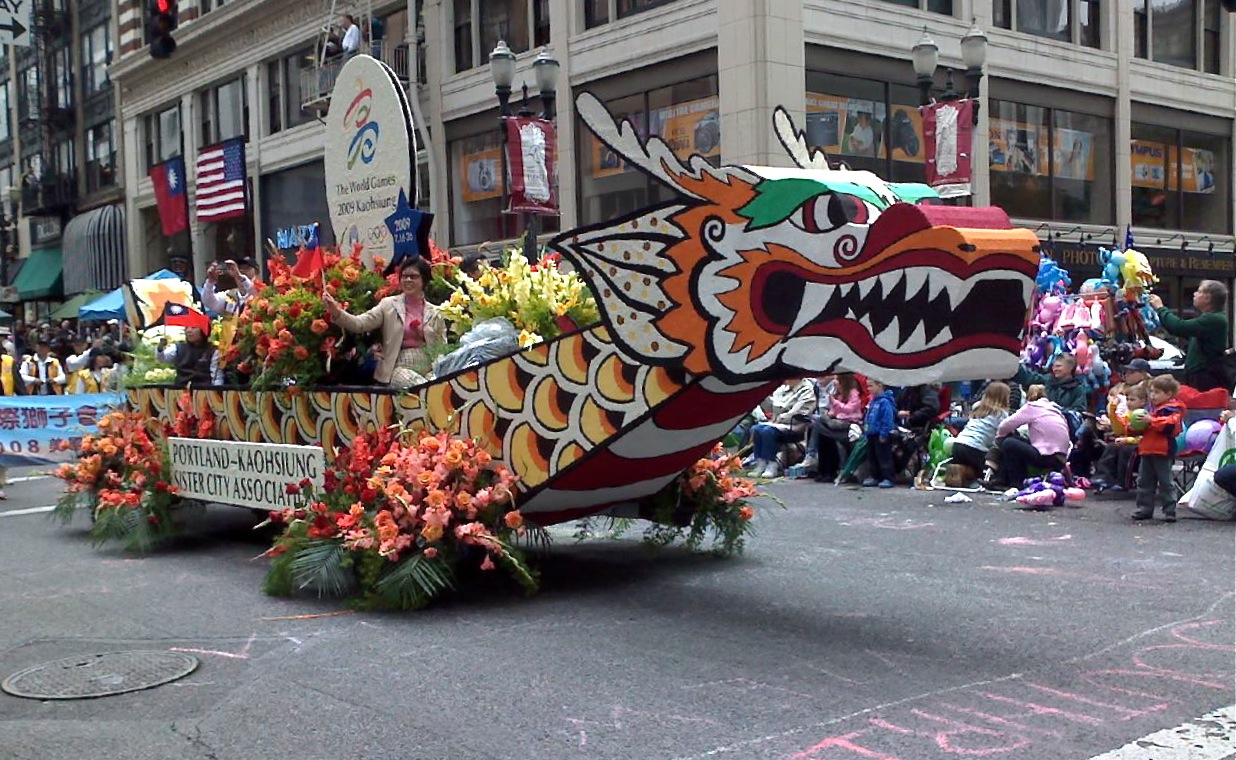
Dragon boat-replica float in 2008 parade. The festival includes races with actual dragon boats.

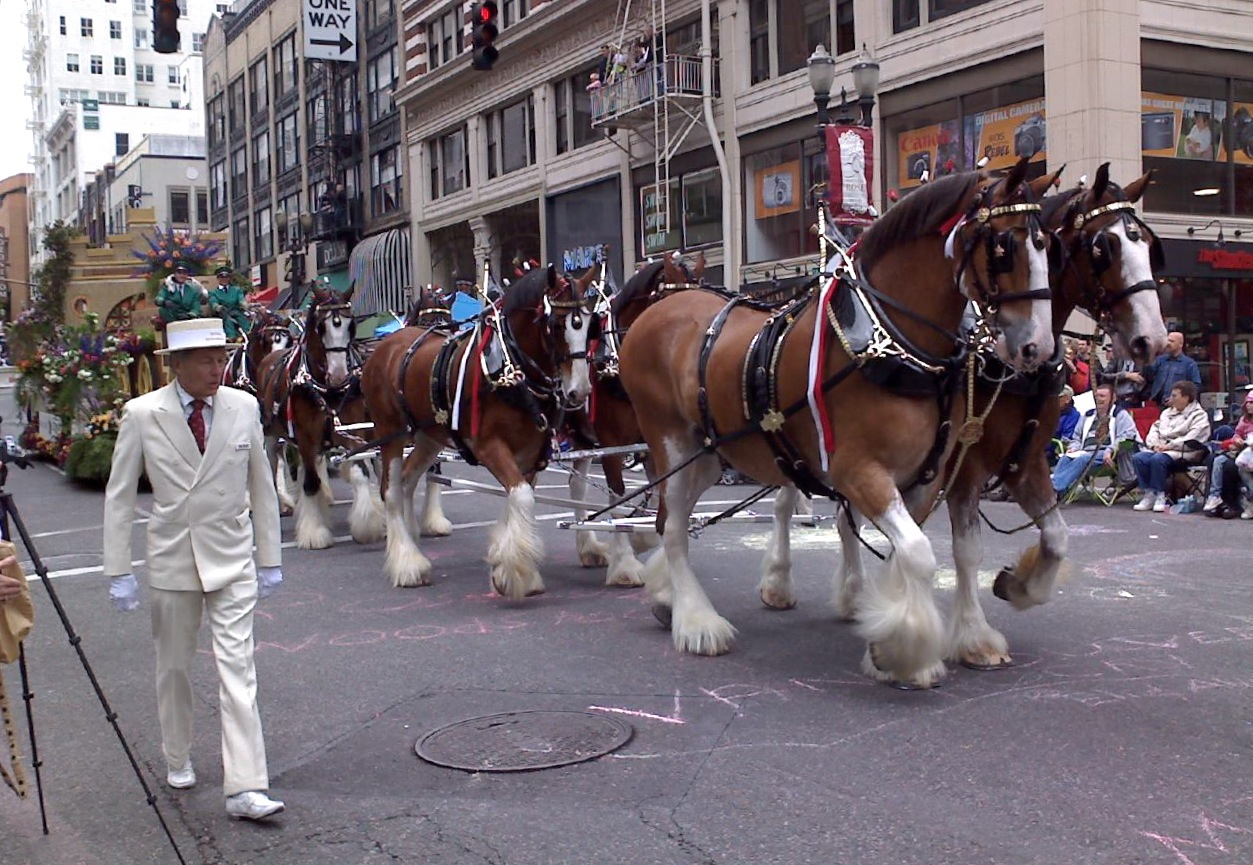
The Budweiser Clydesdales are a frequent participant.

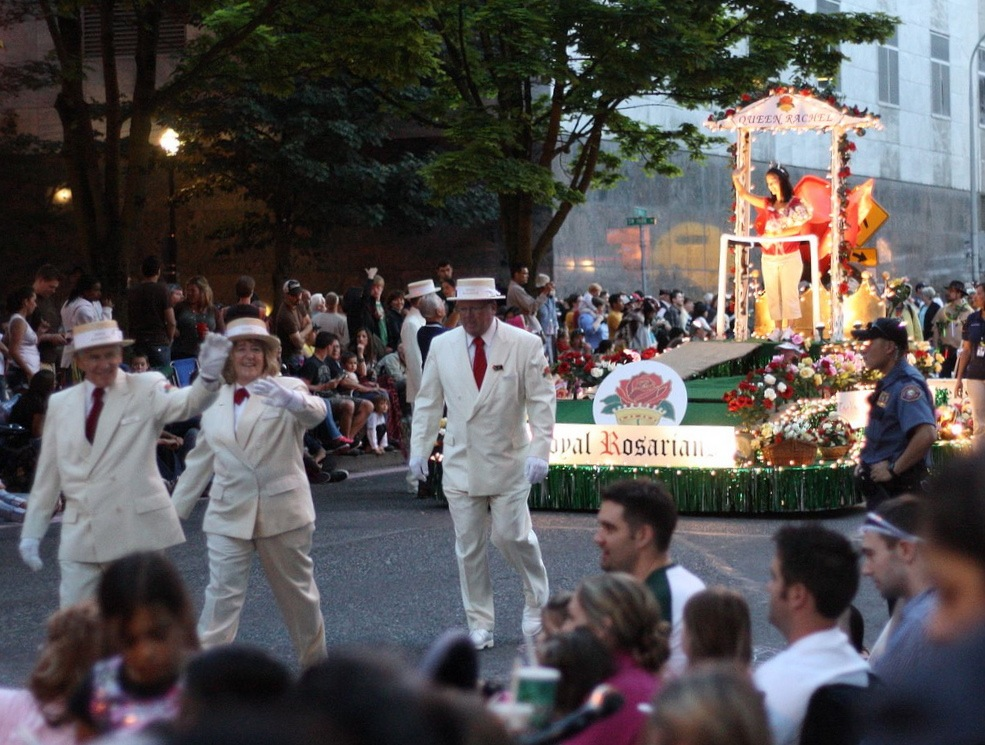
Queen's float in the 2010 Starlight Parade

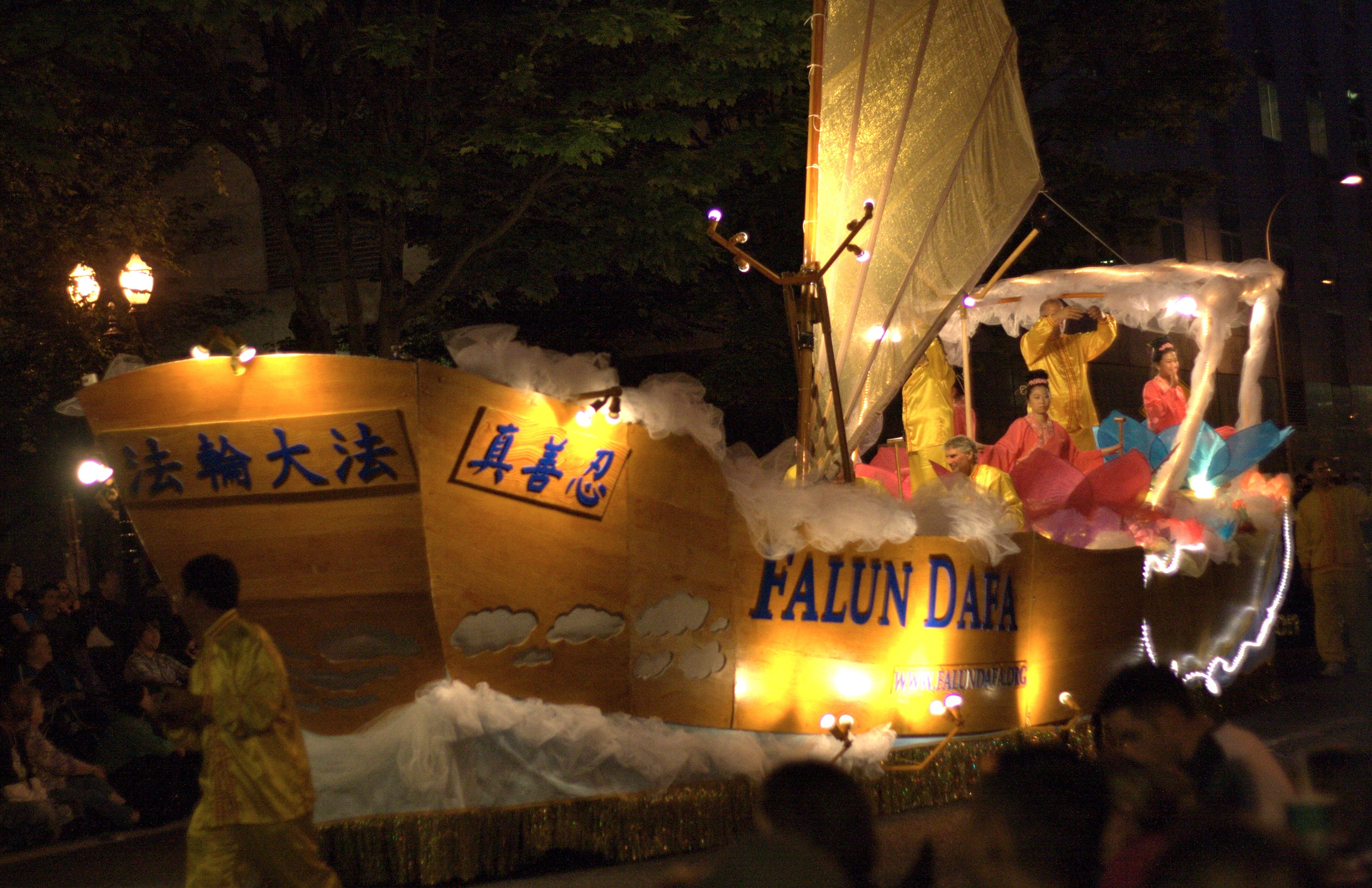
Float in the Starlight Parade

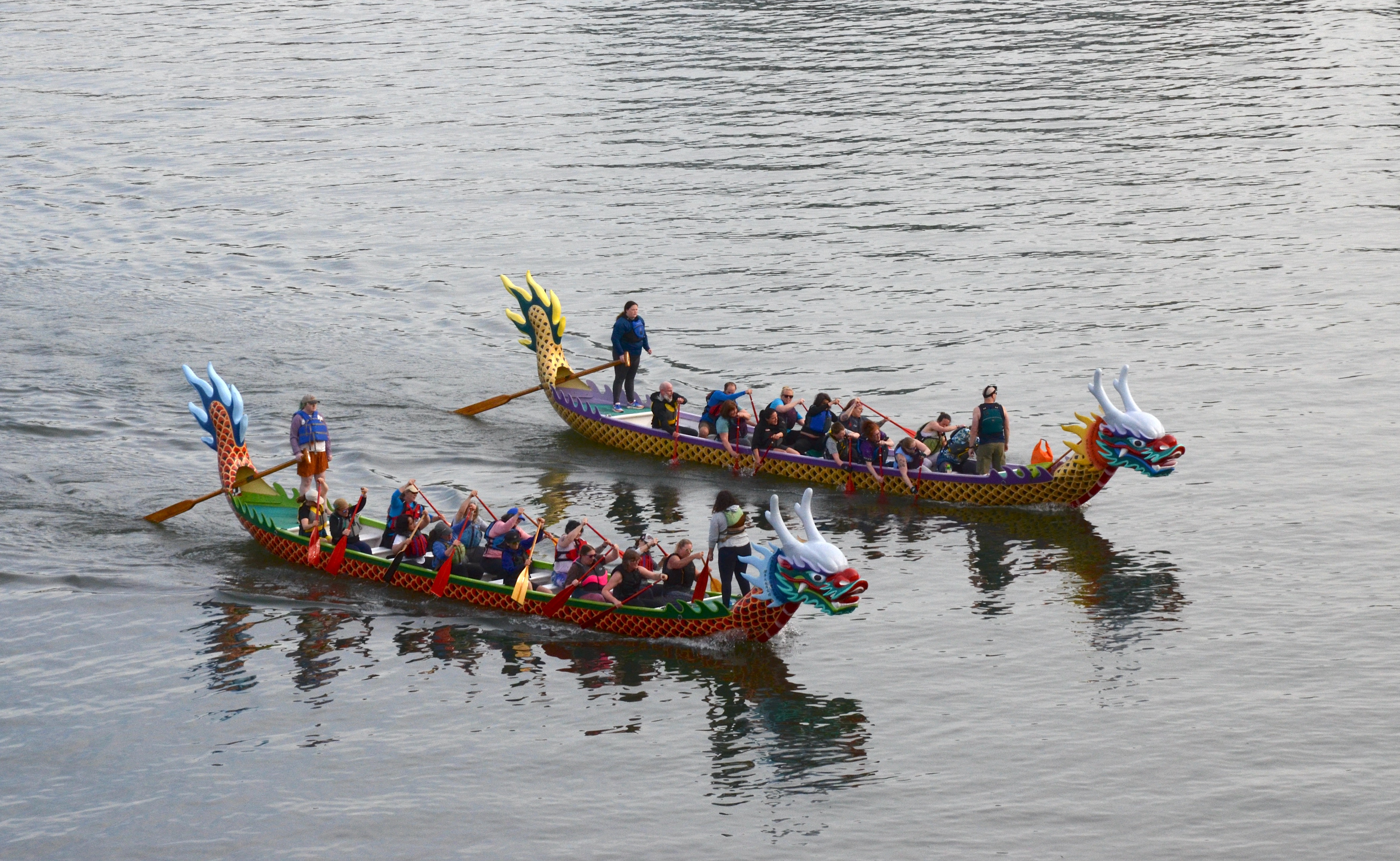
Two dragon boat crews racing during a practice a few weeks before the start of the Rose Festival

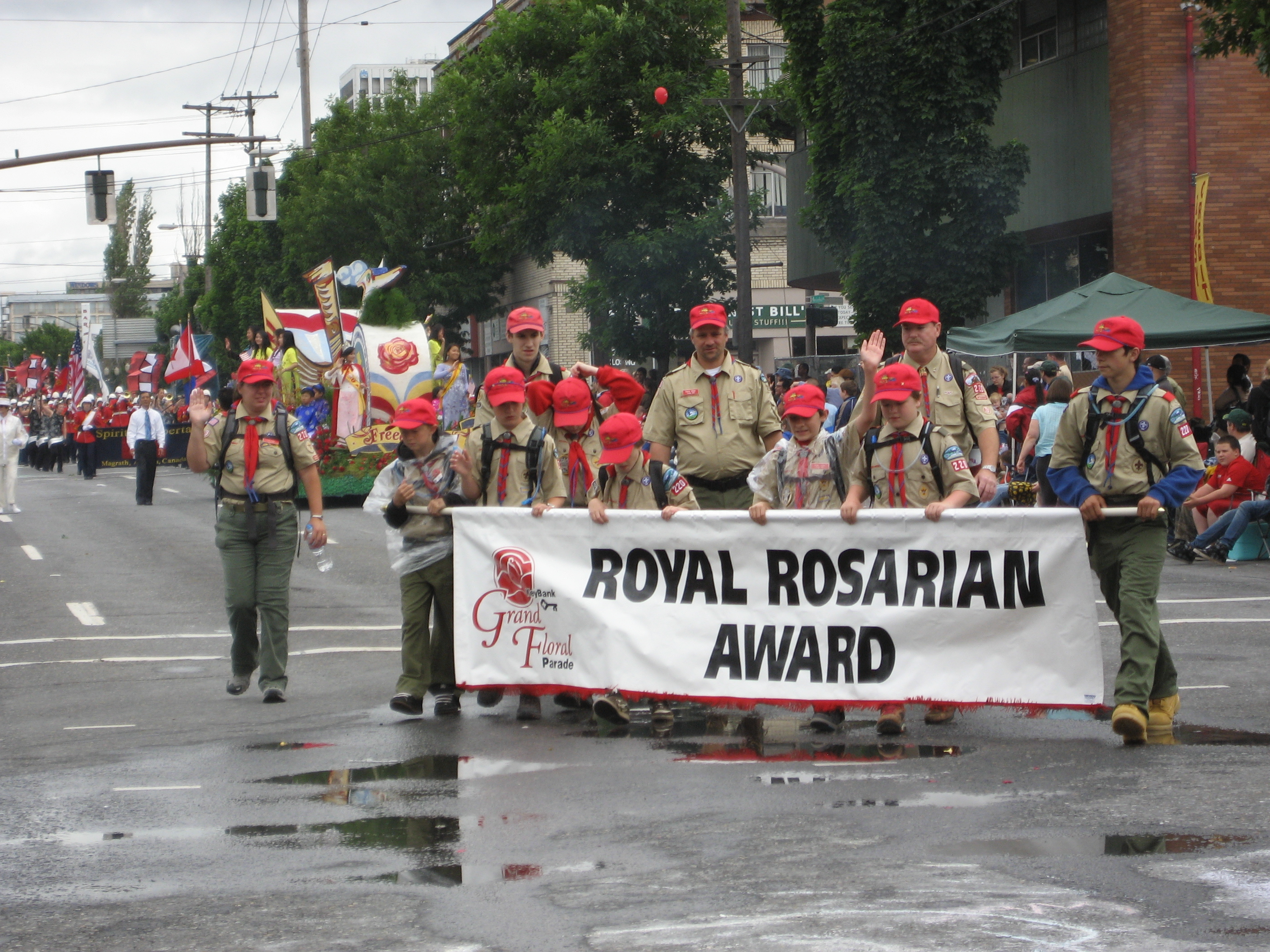
Royal Rosarian Award banner

== See also ==
- Culture of Portland, Oregon
- Portland Gold Medal
- Royal Rosarians
