= USCGC Blackhaw =

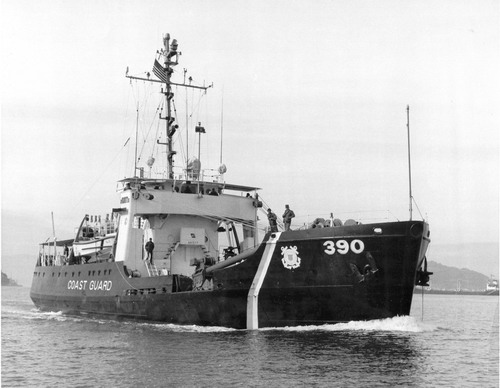
- USCGC Blackhaw underway.

History

United States
- Name: Blackhaw
- Builder: Marine and Iron Shipbuilding Corporation
- Laid down: 16 April 1943
- Launched: 18 June 1943
- Commissioned: 17 February 1944
- Decommissioned: 26 February 1993
- Fate: Sold on 24 November 2000, eventually scrapped
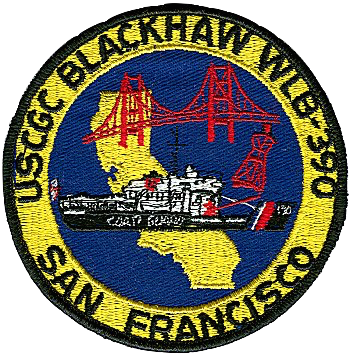
- Badge

General characteristics
- Class & type: Iris-class buoy tender
- Displacement: 935 long tons (950 t)
- Length: 180 ft (55 m)
- Beam: 47 ft 1 in (14.35 m)
- Draft: 12 ft (3.7 m)
- Propulsion: 1 × electric motor connected to 2 Westinghouse generators driven by 2 Cooper Bessemer-type GND-8, 4-cycle diesels; single screw
- Speed: 8.3 kn (15.4 km/h; 9.6 mph) cruising; 13 kn (24 km/h; 15 mph) maximum
- Complement: 6 officers; 74 enlisted
- Armament: 1 × 3 inch gun; 2 × 20 mm/80; 2 × depth charge tracks; 2 × Mousetraps; 4 × Y-guns

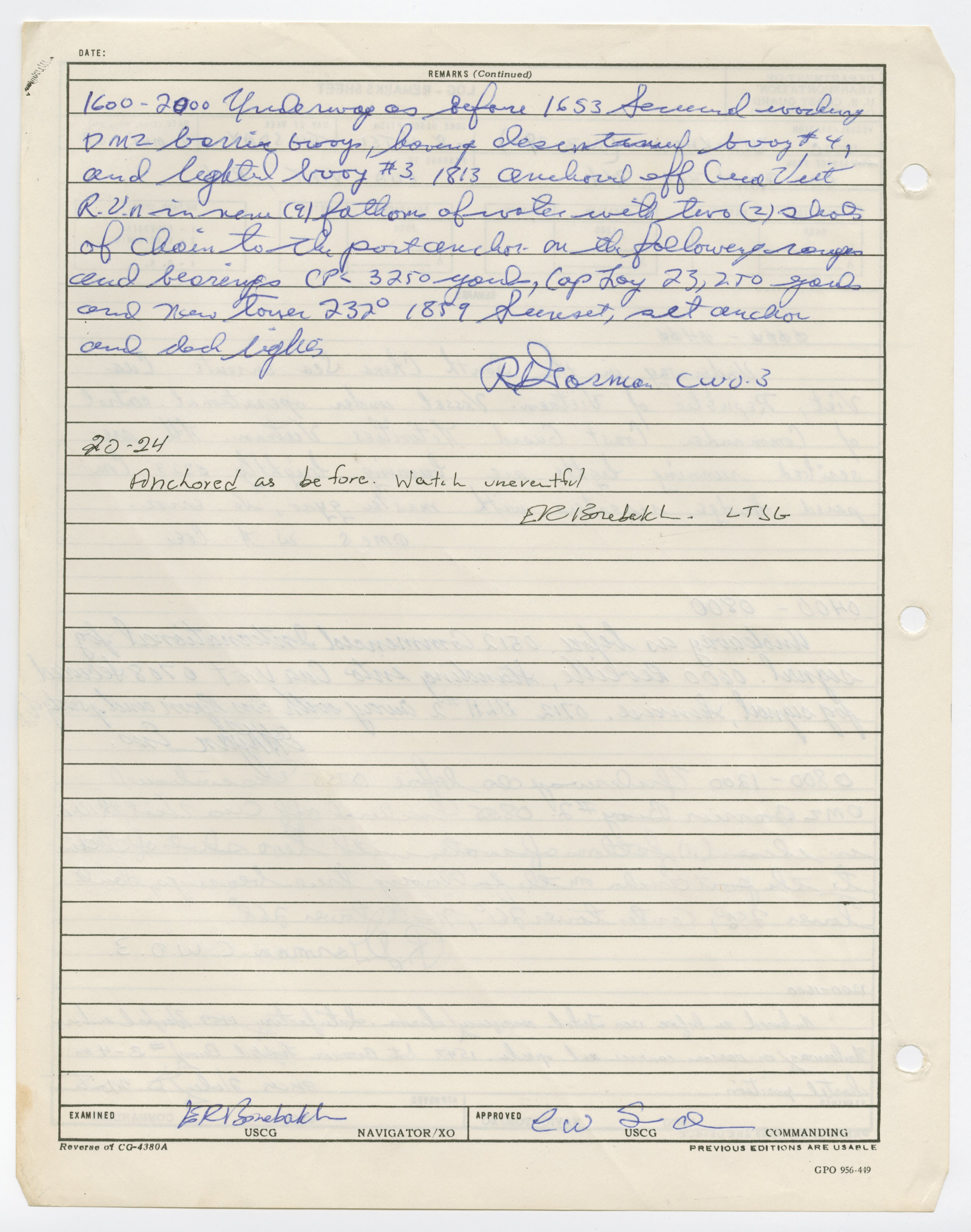
USCG Blackhaw Logbook 1–31 March 1969, page 19, noting the setting of lighted buoys to warn vessels they were coming up on the DMZ. x

The USCGC Blackhaw (WLB-390) was a Iris-class buoy tender belonging to the United States Coast Guard launched on 18 June 1943 and commissioned on 17 February 1944.

== Design ==
The Iris-class buoy tenders were constructed after the Mesquite-class buoy tenders. Blackhaw cost $871,771 to construct and had an overall length of 180 feet (55 m). She had a beam of 37 feet (11 m) and a draft of up to 12 feet (3.7 m) at the time of construction, although this was increased to 14 feet 7 inches (4.45 m) in 1966. She initially had a displacement of 935 long tons (950 t; 1,047 short tons); this was increased to 1,026 long tons (1,042 t; 1,149 short tons) in 1966. She was powered by one electric motor. This was connected up to two Westinghouse generators which were driven by two CooperBessemer GND-8 four-cycle diesel engines. She had a single screw.

The Iris-class buoy tenders had maximum sustained speeds of 13 knots (24 km/h; 15 mph), although this diminished to around 11.9 knots (22.0 km/h; 13.7 mph) in 1966. For economic and effective operation, they had to initially operate at 8.3 knots (15.4 km/h; 9.6 mph), although this increased to 8.5 knots (15.7 km/h; 9.8 mph) in 1966. The ships had a complement of six officers and seventy-four crew members in 1945; this decreased to two warrants, four officers, and forty-seven men in 1966. They were fitted with a SL1 radar system and QBE-3A sonar system in 1945. Their armament consisted of one 3"/50 caliber gun, two 20 mm/80 guns, two Mousetraps, two depth charge tracks, and four Y-guns in 1945; these were removed in 1966.

== Career ==
International radio call sign of USCGC Blackhaw (WLB-390)
November	Oscar	Delta	India

For March and April 1944

Blackhaw was assigned to general aid to navigation (ATON) and icebreaking duties on the Great Lakes. Afterward she was assigned to the 6th Coast Guard District and homeported in Charleston, South Carolina, where she was used for general ATON duties. After the war, until 1 August 1954, Blackhaw continued to be stationed at Charleston, and used for ATON. On 19–20 December 1951, along with USCGC Koiner, Blackhaw assisted the tanker Bulkfuel which was disabled due to a casualty to main-engine fuel pump. The two cutters escorted the tanker to Jacksonville, Florida. From 7–9 September 1952, Blackhaw searched for survivors from MV Foundation Star. Two months later, 19–20 November 1952, the cutter discovered and recovered the wreck of an F8F-2 aircraft. On 29 October 1953, the crew assisted vessel T N. Gill off Charleston. On 1 August 1954, the cutter was transferred to the Pacific and homeported at Honolulu, Hawaii, until 1967. She was used for ATON throughout the Pacific including American Samoa, the Marshalls, the Marianas, the Carolines, and the Philippines. On 11 October 1954 the cutter helped medevac a sailor from USS Kearsarge off Honolulu.

From June to August 1957

Blackhaw operated off Alaska on Special Arctic Operation, including ice breaking. From 9–14 November 1957, she searched for Pan American Flight 944 off Hawaii. On 24 December 1957 the ship assisted FV Hawaiian Fisherman off Kahului, Hawaii and later, on 15 October 1958, did likewise for FV Flying Fish Victor 3. Following a fire onboard MV Nicoline Maersk, Blackhaw responded and escorted the vessel to Honolulu, HI from 23–24 November 1958. On 18 July 1959 Blackhaw relieved USCGC Dexter of her tow of FV Cloud Nine and proceeded to Hawaii.

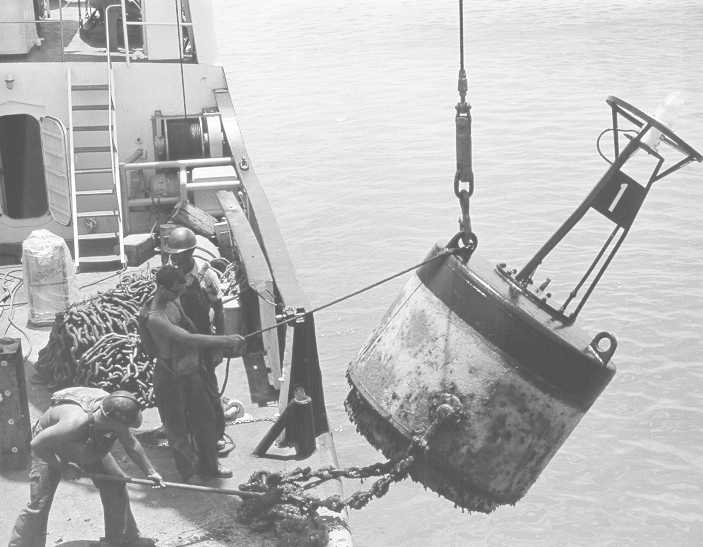
USCGC Blackhaw (WLB-390) hauls in a buoy in Qui Nhơn harbor

From 1967 to 1971

Blackhaw was stationed at Sangley Point, Philippines and used to service ATON. From March 1968 through May 1971 performed numerous tours in Vietnamese waters servicing ATON. After returning from Vietnam the cutter was reassigned to San Francisco from 1971–90, docked at Yerba Buena Island, and used for ATON. During July 1983 the crew replaced the destroyed Blunts Reef Large Navigational Beacon with a new Exposed Location Buoy. During the spring of 1989 the ship and its crew were used in the movie The Hunt for Red October to depict a Soviet icebreaker and its crew.

The cutter was decommissioned at Curtis Bay, MD on 26 February 1993 and her crew was cross-decked to USCGC Buttonwood which was commissioned that same day.

== In popular culture ==
During the spring of 1989, the ship and her crew were used during the filming of The Hunt for Red October to depict a Soviet icebreaker and its crew.

== See also ==
- List of United States Coast Guard cutters

== Gallery ==
United States Coast Guard Cutter Blackhaw Logbook February 1968

United States Coast Guard Cutter Blackhaw Logbook March 1969
