= USCGC Ironwood =

US Coast Guard ship

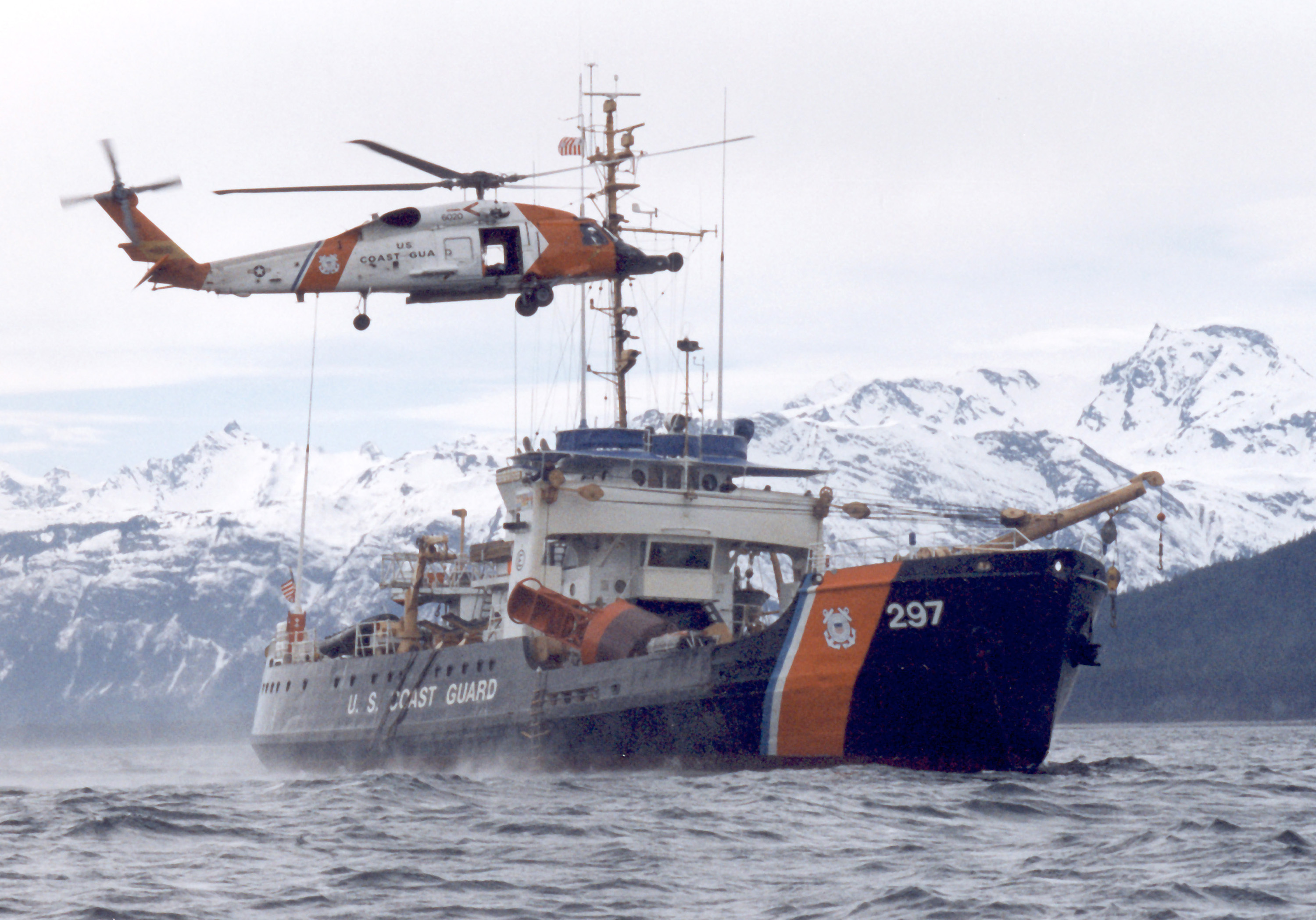
- USCGC Ironwood in 1996

History

United States
- Name: USCGC Ironwood
- Builder: Coast Guard Yard
- Cost: $1,388,227
- Laid down: November 2, 1942
- Launched: March 16, 1943
- Commissioned: August 4, 1943
- Decommissioned: October 6, 2000
- Identification: Signal letters NRPN

United States
- Name: Ironwood
- Operator: Job Corps Seamanship Academy
- In service: 2002
- Home port: Astoria, Oregon
- Identification: MMSI number: 367450570; Callsign WDF4331
- Status: Active

General characteristics as built in 1943
- Displacement: 935 tons
- Length: 180 ft (55 m)
- Beam: 37 ft (11 m)
- Draft: 12 ft (3.7 m)
- Installed power: 2 x Cooper-Bessemer GND-8 Diesel engines
- Propulsion: 1 propeller
- Speed: 13.5 kn (25.0 km/h; 15.5 mph)
- Range: 8,000 nmi (15,000 km; 9,200 mi) at 13 kn (24 km/h; 15 mph)
- Complement: 6 Officers; 74 Enlisted
- Armament: 3"/50 gun; 2 x 20mm gun; Depth charges

USCGC Ironwood (WAGL-297/WLB-297) is a former Mesquite-class sea-going buoy tender operated by the United States Coast Guard. She served in World War II, the Korean War, and the Vietnam War as well as a variety of domestic missions. She currently serves as a seamanship training vessel for Job Corps.

== Construction and characteristics ==
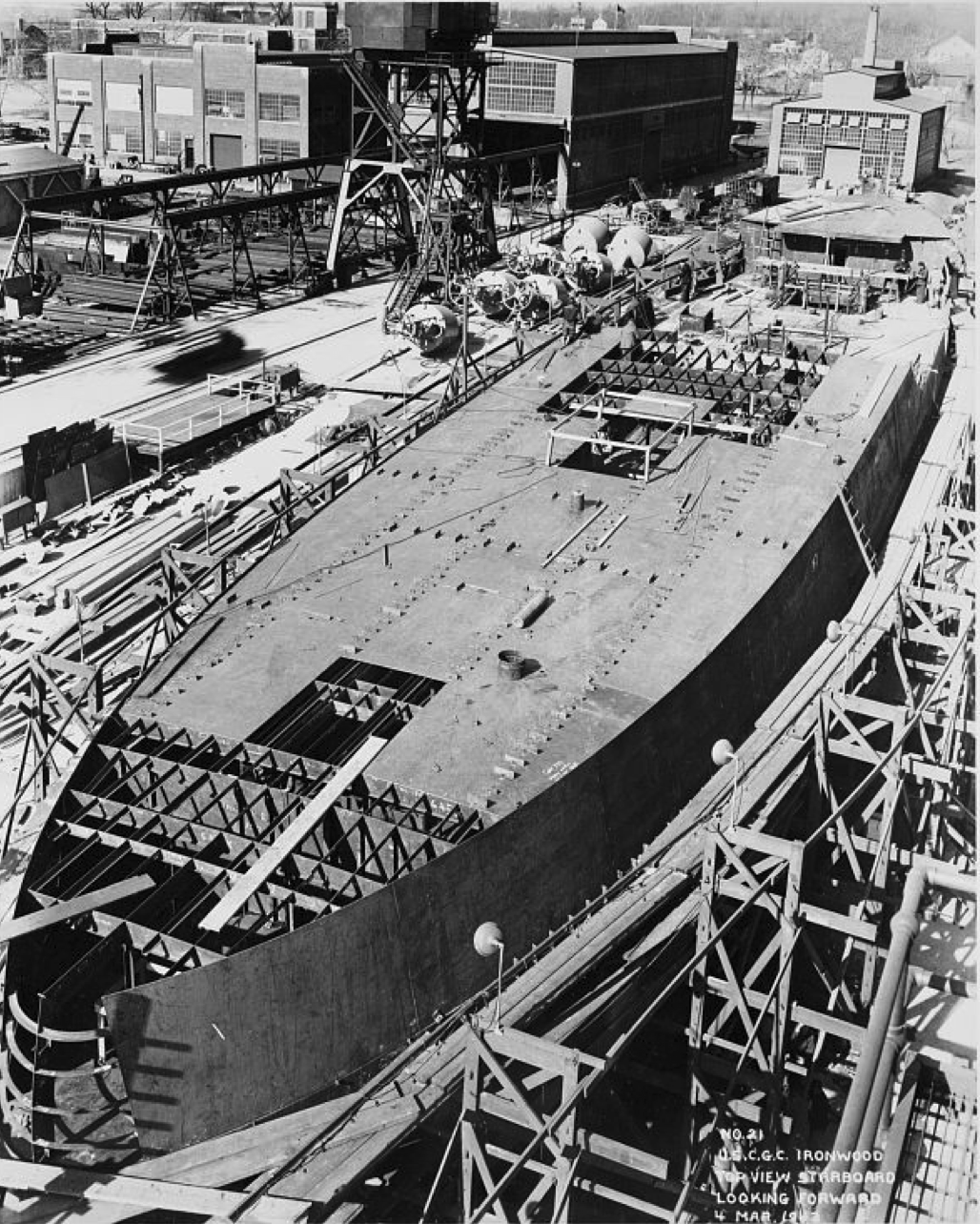
USCGC Ironwood under construction in 1943

Ironwood was built at the Coast Guard Yard at Curtis Bay, Maryland. All other Mesquite-class ships were built at a commercial shipyard. Despite her identical design, Ironwood was by far the most expensive ship in her class. She cost the Coast Guard Yard $1,388,227 while the other five Mesquite-class ships cost an average of $878,029. She was the largest vessel ever built at the Coast Guard Yard at the time of her launch.

Her keel was laid down on November 2, 1942, she was launched on March 16, 1943, and she was commissioned on August 4, 1943.

Her hull was constructed of welded steel plates. As originally built, Ironwood was 180 feet (55 m) long, with a beam of 37 feet (11 m), and a draft of 12 feet (3.7 m). Her displacement was 935 tons. While her overall dimensions remained the same over her career, the addition of new equipment raised her displacement to 1,025 tons by the end of her Coast Guard service.

Ironwood had a single propeller driven by a diesel-electric propulsion system. Two Cooper-Bessemer GND-8 4-cycle 8-cylinder Diesel engines produced 700 horsepower each and when later upgraded to EMD 645-GN8-E6s They provided power to two Westinghouse generators. The electricity from the generators ran an electric motor which turned the propeller.

She had a single cargo boom which had the ability to lift 20 tons onto her buoy deck.

The ship's fuel tanks had a capacity of approximately 28,875 US gallons (109,300 L). Ironwood's unrefueled range was 8,000 nautical miles (15,000 km) at 13 knots, 12,000 nautical miles (22,000 km) at 12 knots, and 17,000 nautical miles (31,000 km) at 8.3 knots. Her potable water tanks had a capacity of 30,499 US gallons (115,450 L). Considering dry storage capacity and other factors, her at-sea endurance was 21 days.

Her wartime complement was 6 officers and 74 enlisted men. By 1964 this was reduced to 5 officers, 2 warrant officers, and 42 enlisted personnel.

Ironwood was armed with a 3"/50 caliber gun mounted behind the pilot house. She also had two 20mm guns, one mounted on top of the wheelhouse and one on the aft deck. Two racks of depth charges were also mounted on the aft deck. All of her on-deck armament was removed in 1966, leaving only small arms for law enforcement actions.

At the time of construction, Ironwood was designated WAGL, an auxiliary vessel, lighthouse tender. The designation was system was changed in 1965, and Ironwood was redesignated WLB, an oceangoing buoy tender. Her namesake is a small tree or bush native to the midwest and south of the United States, Sideroxylon lanuginosum. One of its many common names is ironwood.

== World War II service ==
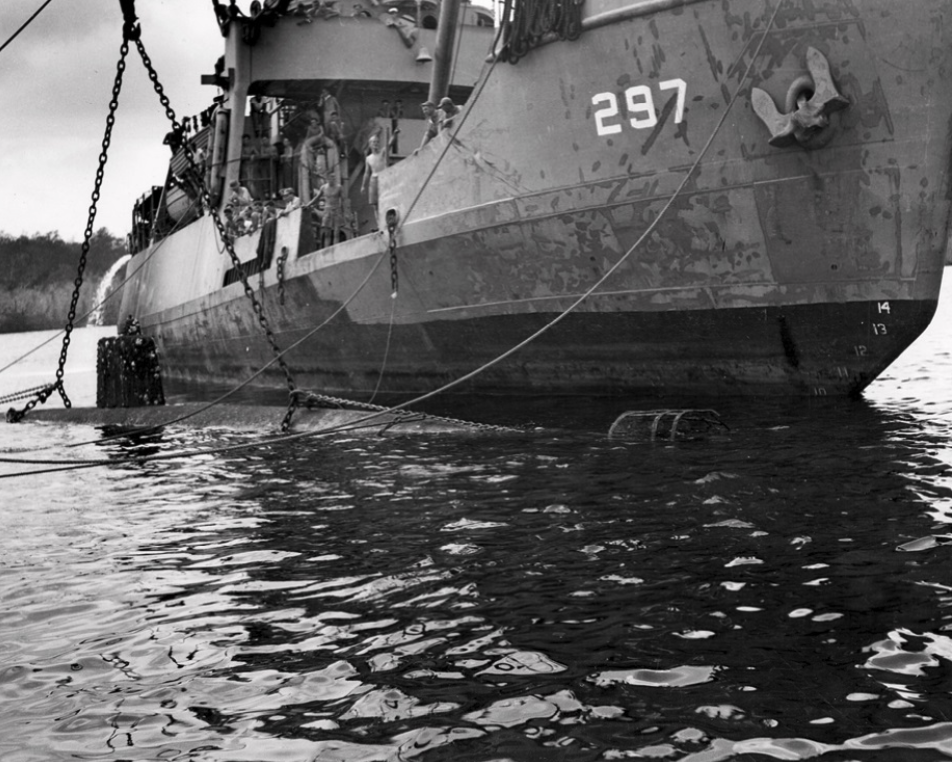
USCGC Ironwood raising Japanese midget submarine off Guadalcanal

After commissioning, and a short trial and training period in the Boston area, Ironwood sailed for the Pacific. She broke her propeller shaft en route and was towed in to Key West, Florida for repairs. She departed Key West February 12, 1944. Ironwood was able to reach New Caledonia on March 24, 1944 via Bora Bora, and Pago Pago. Her primary mission was supporting aids to navigation, moorings, and torpedo nets in 3rd Fleet operating areas. In addition, she moved cargo, mail, and personnel, towed barges and other vessels, participated in establishing the LORAN network, and provided search and rescue.

She rescued 65 Navy and Marine personnel from the grounded freighter SS John Lind on March 28, 1944, returning them to Noumea the next day. She and two Navy tugs managed to pull the freighter off the reef and refloat her several days later.

In January 1945 Ironwood sailed to Guadalcanal where Japanese midget submarine HA-37 had been discovered in shallow water off Cape Esperance. The two-man crew of the sub had aborted their mission and had run it ashore after discovering its depth regulator was faulty. It took more than two weeks for divers to work a lifting bridle around the sub. On January 25, 1945 Ironwood raised the sub and towed it to Florida Island. Navy mine disposal officers were unable to remove its torpedoes, so after the sub was searched, it was sunk.

Ironwood was assigned to the 7th Fleet and sailed to Philippine waters, arriving at Leyte on August 6, 1945. Here she removed Japanese buoys and placed American aids to navigation and moorings.

In summer 1947, Ironwood returned to San Francisco for a major refit. She reached her new homeport of Monterey, California in November. In addition to her work maintaining aids to navigation, she was involved in search and rescue efforts for lost ships and planes. She destroyed a derelict floating Japanese mine off Monterey Bay on April 11, 1948.

== Pacific service ==
In May 1950, Ironwood was reassigned to Guam. From this base she serviced aids to navigation and LORAN stations throughout a wide area of the Pacific. On November 15, 1951 Ironwood became the first Coast Guard buoy tender to enter the Korean War. Between 1951 and 1954 Ironwood deployed to Korea four times. She supported LORAN stations on the peninsula. She was one of 24 Coast Guard ships that earned the Korean Service Medal. By the late 1990s she out-lived all her peers and was the last active-duty ship so honored.

In July 1954 Ironwood was reassigned to Honolulu, Hawaii. From this new homeport she ranged widely over the central Pacific servicing aids to navigation and LORAN stations. For example, in June 1960 she left Honolulu for a four month cruise with working stops in Samoa, Ponape, Truk, Guam, Koror, Ulithi, and Okinawa. During this cruise, in August 1960, Ironwood was caught in Typhoon Trix while en route to Osaka, Japan. Her captain was unable to avoid the storm which carried 155 mph winds. A large wave swamped her aft deck. Water poured into the engine room and shorted out the electrical control board. The main engines and generators stopped, leaving the ship adrift with no electrical power. After extinguishing an electrical fire, the crew was able to restore enough power to radio for help. An Army tug was able to tow Ironwood to port in Okinawa.

In August of 1963 Ironwood undertook a special mission to investigate radiation levels at Rongelap Atoll in the aftermath of a 1954 hydrogen bomb test on Bikini Atoll. A temporary lab was constructed on her buoy deck. For twelve days the ship carried a party of scientists around the atoll sampling plankton, fish, and vegetation. Much of the atoll was uncharted, so hydrographic data was collected as well. One of the newly discovered geographic features was named Ironwood Reef in honor of the ship.

In 1967 the Republic of Vietnam had only a single buoy tender. It was not adequate to maintain and improve navigational aids needed by the increased US shipping activity along the South Vietnamese coast. The Coast Guard deployed four buoy tenders, including Ironwood, on short rotations to support aids to navigation during the Vietnam war. Ironwood's first deployment began in July 1967. Among the unique challenges faced in the war zone was that aids to navigation were used for target practice by all sides in the conflict. Batteries for lighted buoys were stolen by all sides for use in cars and other applications. Whenever any of the Coast Guard buoy tenders were deployed to the theater they sailed with Vietnamese lighthouse service personnel aboard. The training they received was deemed sufficient to turn over responsibility for maintaining their own aids to navigation in December 1972, but by then the regime was falling. The last Coast Guard buoy tender left Vietnamese waters in the spring of 1973 as part of the general withdrawal of U.S. forces.

== Alaska service ==
On January 5, 1969 Ironwood arrived in Homer, Alaska. She was the first Coast Guard ship home-ported there. An Atlantic Richfield Company tanker, SS Yukon, hit a rock in Cook Inlet in March 1969 and began to spill oil. Ironwood was dispatched to the scene to escort the vessel to safety. In April 1969 a Shell Oil drilling platform in Cook Inlet exploded and caught fire. Ironwood responded, assisting in fire fighting. While stationed at Homer she was active in enforcing fisheries laws in the Bering Sea.

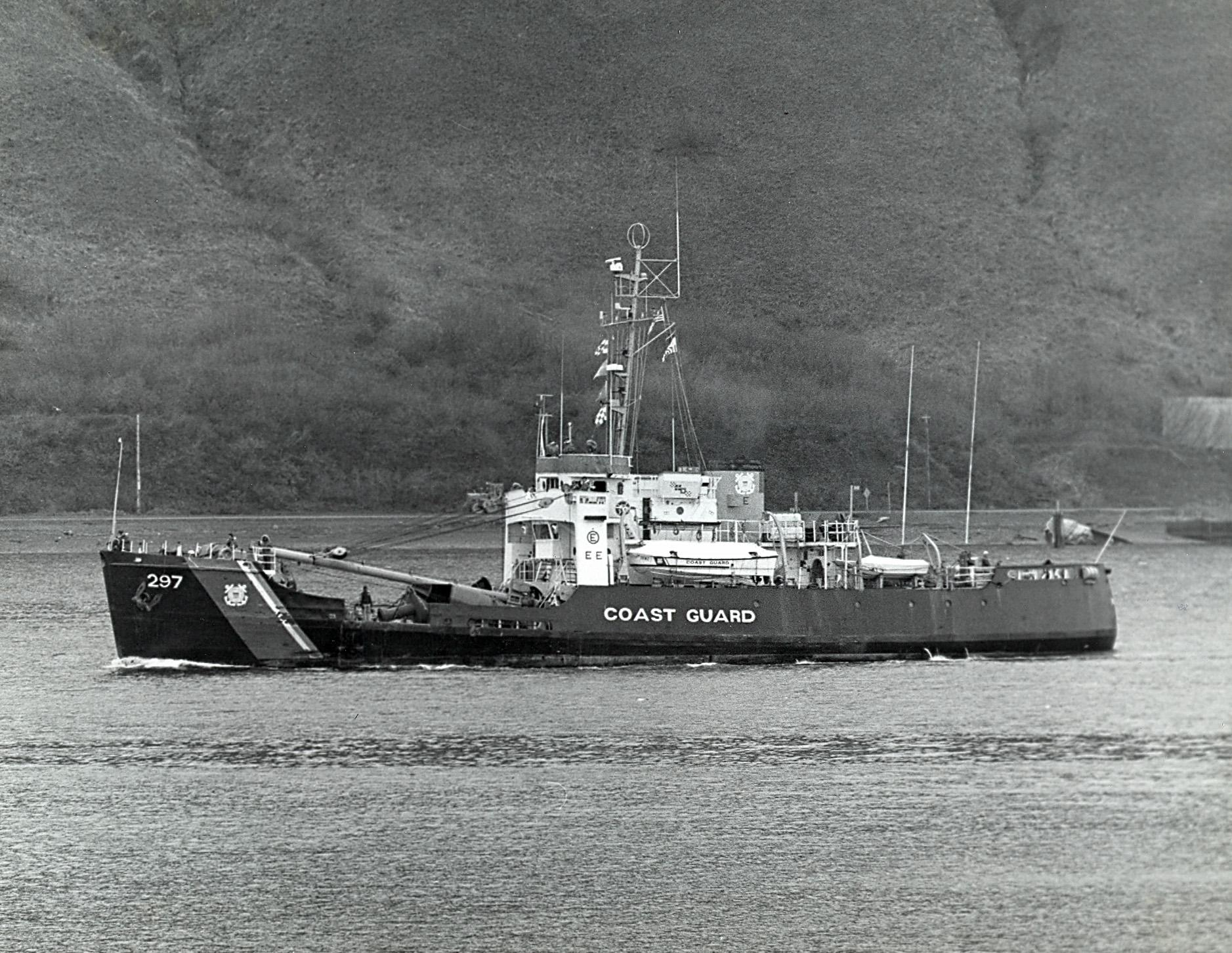
USCGC Ironwood in 1979

In 1974 Ironwood underwent a major renovation at the Coast Guard Yard where she was built. Her Diesel engines were overhauled, and she received a new electric motor to power her propeller. Water and sewage piping was replaced. Wiring and electrical switchboards were replaced. A bow thruster was added to improve her maneuverability. Crew quarters were modernized.

After her renovation, Ironwood was assigned to Adak, Alaska. She was manned by the crew of the recently decommissioned USCGC Balsam, which had been assigned to Adak prior to her retirement. She arrived at her new homeport in 1975. During this assignment she rescued four fisherman who had abandoned their vessel on Great Sitkin Island.

After her service on Adak, she was reassigned to Kodiak, Alaska, where she spent the rest of her Coast Guard career. She arrived on May 1, 1979. On March 24, 1989, the Exxon Valdez ran aground on Bligh Reef in Prince William Sound spilling 10,800,000 US gallons (41,000 m^{3}) of crude oil. Ironwood was dispatched as part of a large Coast Guard response. She placed boom, set moorings for the response fleet, and observed conditions of the oil slick and affected wildlife.

Ironwood was decommissioned at a small ceremony at Kodiak on October 6, 2000. She received many awards during her government service including Coast Guard Unit Commendation, two Meritorious Unit Commendations, World War II Victory Medal, Asiatic-Pacific Campaign Medal, American Campaign Medal, 6 E-ribbons, Korean Service Medal, and Vietnam Service Medal.

== Civilian service ==
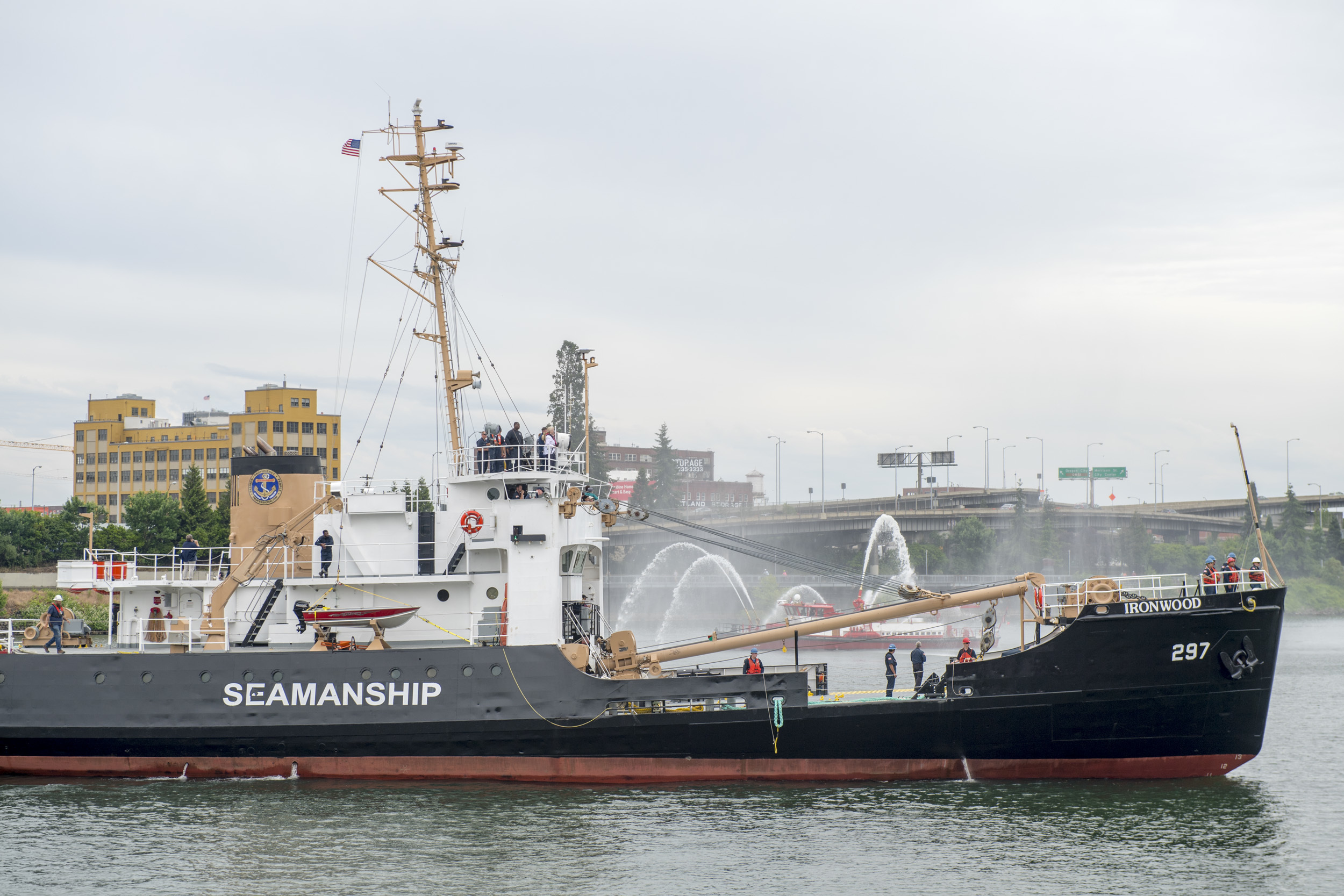
Training Vessel Ironwood at 2017 Fleet Week

The Coast Guard planned to sell Ironwood to the Nigerian Navy, but the deal fell through. She was sold to a private individual instead in February 2001. He, in turn, donated the ship to the U.S. Department of Labor which uses it as a training vessel in the Job Corps Seamanship Academy at Tongue Point in Astoria, Oregon. She now sails with a crew of sixty students and six instructors.

Ironwood participated in the Fleet Week celebrations in Portland, Oregon in 2017.
