= USCGC Bluebell =

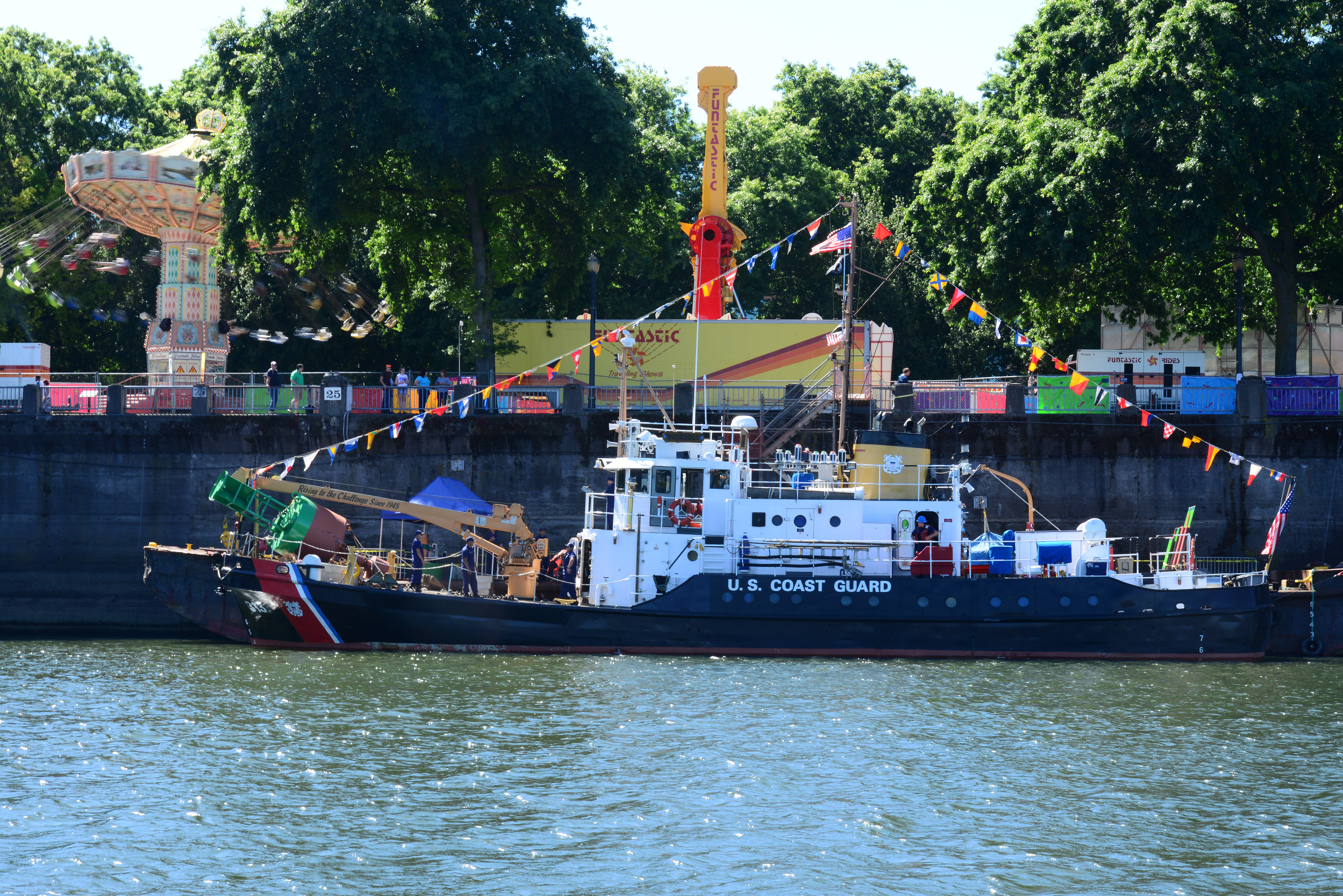
- The Coast Guard Cutter Bluebell sits moored along the Willamette River waterfront

History

United States
- Name: USCGC Bluebell (WLI-313)
- Commissioned: 4 April 1945
- Home port: Portland, Oregon
- Identification: MMSI number: 369493484; Callsign: NODD
- Motto: Rising to the Challenge Since 1945
- Status: In service
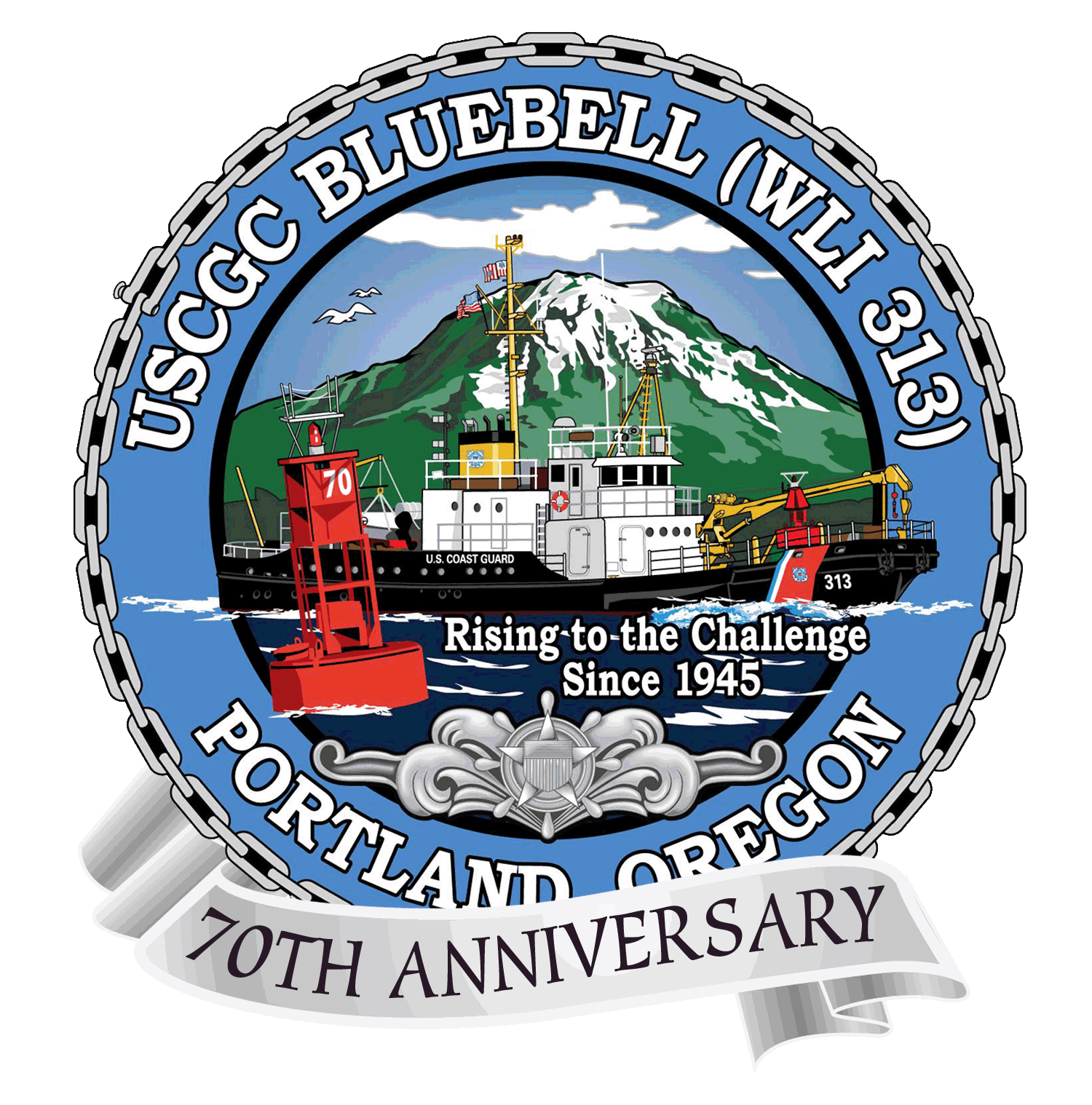
- Badge

General characteristics
- Class & type: Inland buoy tender
- Length: 100 ft (30 m)
- Crew: 15 Active Duty, 5 Reserve

USCGC Bluebell (WLI-313) is a United States Coast Guard inland buoy tender based out of Portland, Oregon.

== History ==
Bluebell was commissioned on April 4, 1945. From 1945 to 1973 Bluebell was stationed in Vancouver, Washington. Bluebell was moved to Swan Island in Portland, Oregon, in 1973, where she has remained since. Bluebell is classified as an inland buoy tender and is one of two 100-foot inland buoy tenders in service. The other, is the Coast Guard Cutter Buckthorn (WLI-642) homeported in Sault Ste. Marie, MI.

Bluebell is the second oldest cutter in the Coast Guard fleet, and the oldest west of the Mississippi River. The ship is home to a crew of 15 led by a chief warrant officer, with a chief petty officer as the second in command.

== Mission ==
As a buoy tender, the crew's primary mission is to ensure the safety of mariners by establishing and maintaining essential navigation aids along established waterways. The crew is responsible for maintaining more than 420 aids to navigation (ATONs) along 500 miles across the Columbia, Willamette and Snake Rivers. Altogether, Bluebell’s crew is responsible for 23 percent of the ATONs in the Pacific Northwest.
