= USCGC Terrapin =

United States Coast Guard ship

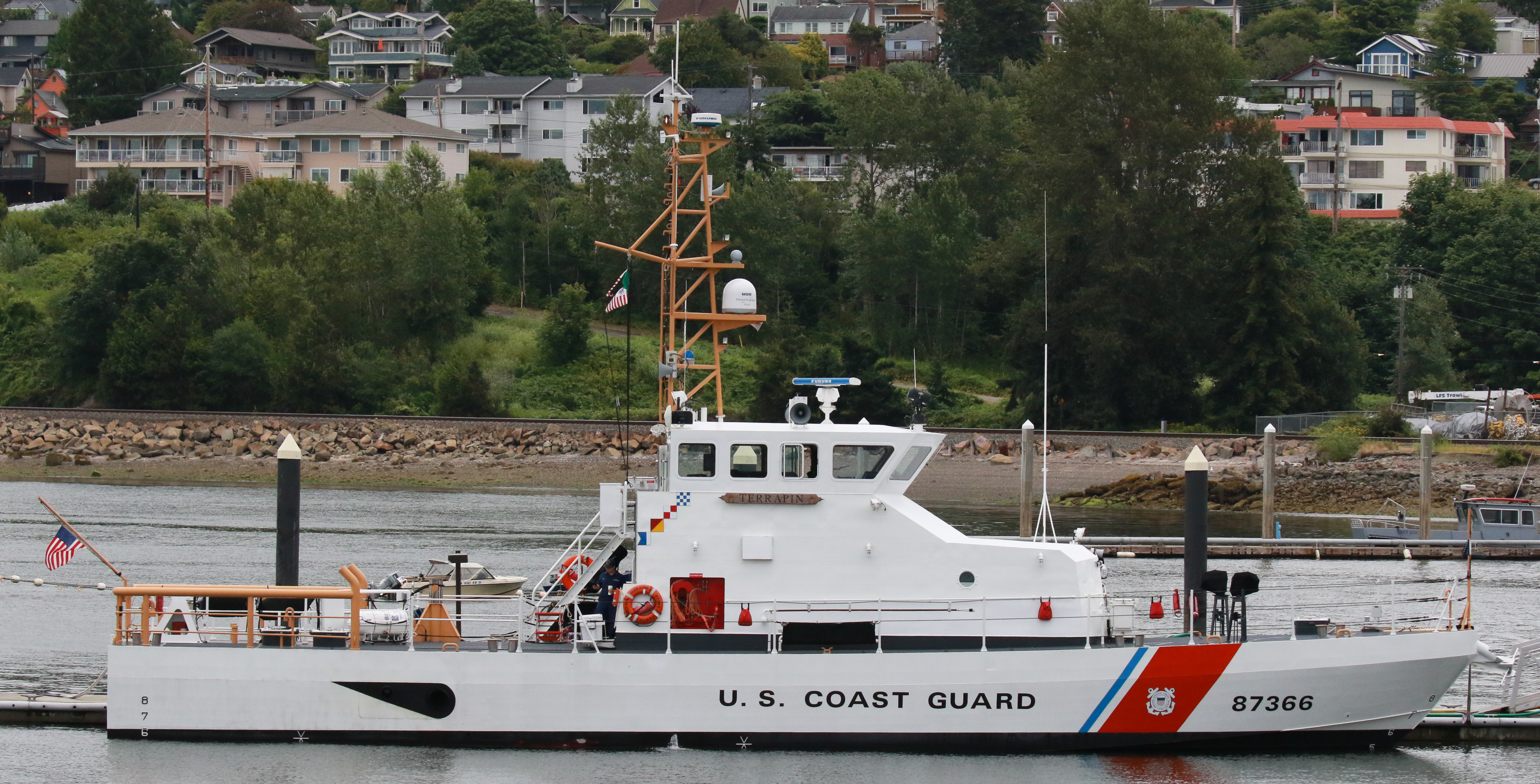
- Terrapin moored in Bellingham, WA

History

United States
- Name: USCGC Terrapin
- Builder: Bollinger Shipyards
- Launched: August 8, 2005
- Home port: Bellingham, Washington, U.S.
- Identification: MMSI number: 366999651; Callsign: NOUA
- Status: in active service

General characteristics
- Displacement: 91 long tons (92 t)
- Length: 87 ft 0 in (26.5 m)
- Beam: 19 ft 5 in (5.9 m)
- Draft: 5 ft 7 in (1.7 m)
- Propulsion: 2 x MTU diesels
- Speed: 26 knots (48 km/h)
- Range: 900 nmi (1,700 km)
- Endurance: 5 days
- Complement: 11
- Armament: 2 × .50 caliber M2 Browning machine guns

USCGC Terrapin (WPB-87366) is a United States Coast Guard ship of the Marine Protector class. She is assigned to Coast Guard District 13 and is home-ported at Bellingham, Washington. Her main areas of responsibility are the San Juan Islands, the Strait of Juan de Fuca, and Puget Sound. Her missions include search and rescue, law enforcement, and homeland security.

== Construction and characteristics ==
Terrapin's Marine Protector class design was derived from a Damen Group patrol boat design. This design was modified for U.S. Coast Guard requirements by Bollinger Shipyards. Terrapin was built at Bollinger Shipyards' Lockport, Louisiana shipyard. She was launched on August 8, 2005. She was commissioned on March 23, 2006, at a ceremony in Bellingham. Her sponsor at the ceremony was Washington Governor Chris Gregoire.

Terrapin is 87 feet (27 m) long, with a beam of 19 ft 5 in (5.9 m), and a draft of 5 ft 7 in (1.7 m). She displaces approximately 90 long tons (91 t).

Terrapin's top speed is approximately 26 knots (48 km/h), at which speed her engines burn 165 U.S. gallons (620 L) per hour. Propulsion power is provided by two 1,500 horsepower MTU 8V 396 TE94 diesel engines. These, in turn drive two five-blade fixed-pitch propellers. Electrical power on the ship is provided by two Man DO 824 LF01 diesel generators. Her tanks hold approximately 2,800 U.S. gallons (11,000 L) of diesel fuel, giving her an unrefueled range of 900 nautical miles (1,700 km).

Her main armament is a pair of crew-served fifty-caliber Browning M2 machine guns, on either side of her foredeck. She also has small arms for boarding operations.

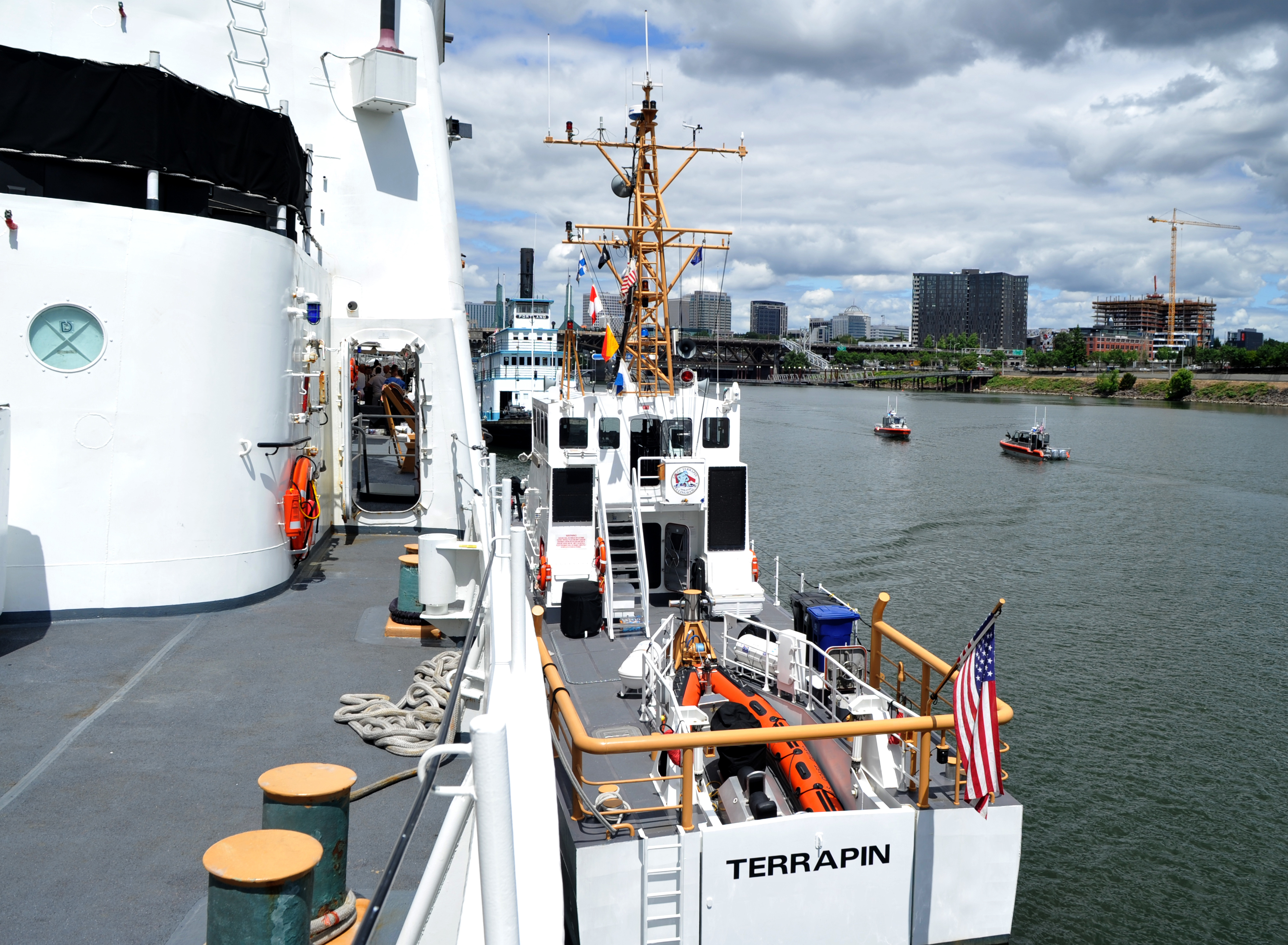
USCGC Terrapin, showing the stern launching ramp and RIB

Terrapin is equipped with a stern launching ramp, that allows the vessel to deploy or retrieve its pursuit boat in bad weather and without having to stop. The boat is a Zodiac Hurricane 558 10J. The rigid hull inflatable is powered by a 200-horsepower Yanmar diesel engine. This drives a water jet propulsion system which allows the boat to reach a speed of 30 knots (56 km/h).

Terrapin is equipped with an AN/SPS-73 surface search radar.

The ship normally sails with a crew of eleven. These typically include a captain, executive officer, cook, 4 engineering staff, and three deckhands. She is designed for a mixed-gender crew. She has berths for 12 crew, in five separate berthing spaces. There are two heads with showers. She has a galley and seating for nine in a dining area. She has a separate ship's office.

The ships of the Marine Protector class are named after creatures which fly or swim. Terrapin is named after the terrapin, an aquatic turtle.

== Operational history ==
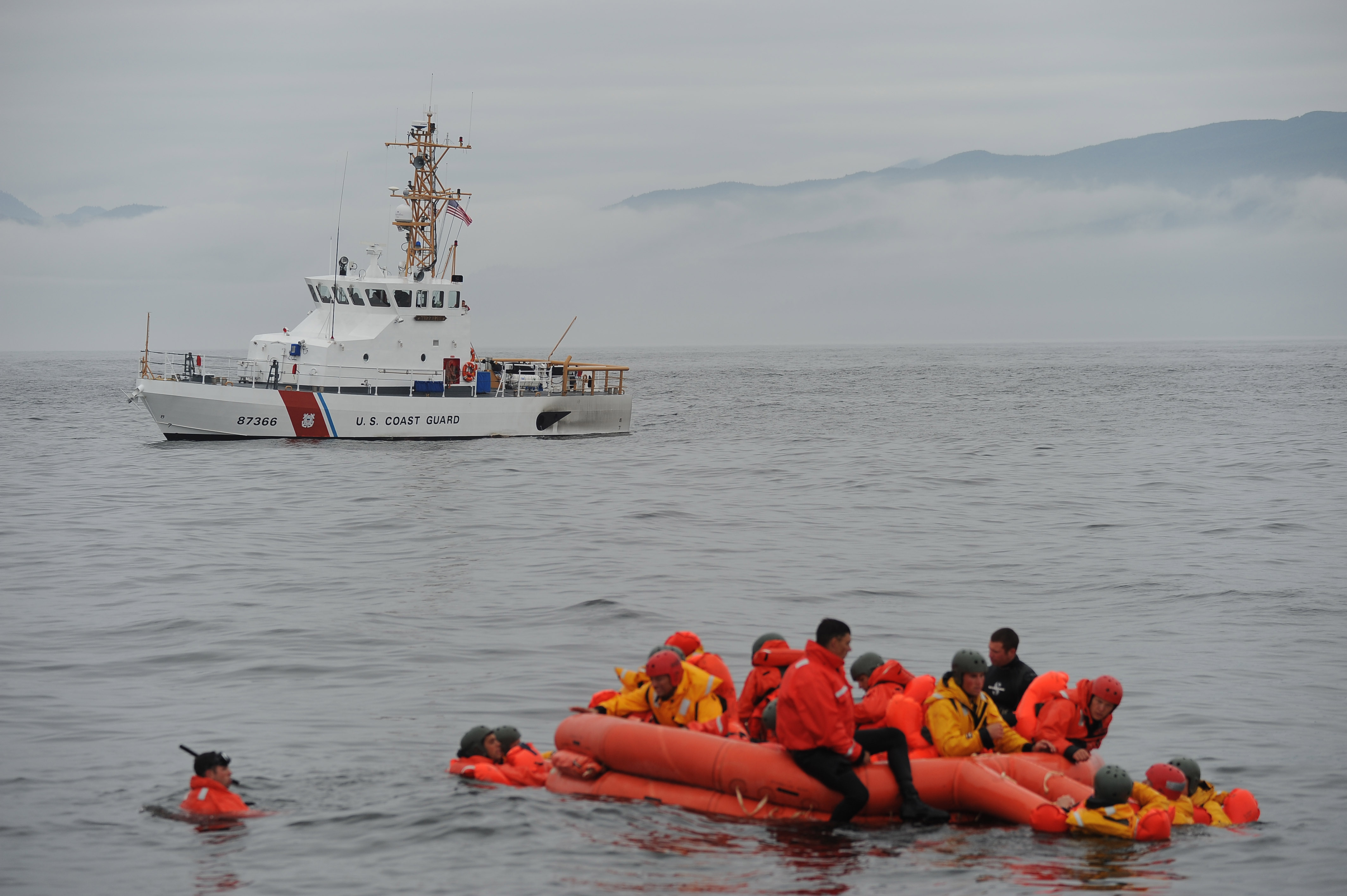
USCGC Terrapin maintains a safety zone while airman practice survival skills

Terrapin has been involved in several successful search and rescue missions. On September 25, 2010, the sailing vessel Zodiac was dismasted while she had a school excursion aboard. Terrapin towed the disabled vessel back to Bellingham. She rescued six people from a grounded boat in Thatcher Pass in the San Juan Islands on the night of August 27, 2011. On February 15, 2014, Terrapin rescued five people from a storm-damaged sailboat near Port Ludlow under the command of LTJG Gregory Bernstein. The ship towed the disabled fishing boat Lady Law back to port on March 28, 2018.

While the bulk of the cutter's work has been in the vicinity of her home port, she has also taken on missions elsewhere on the US west coast. Off the coast of Southern California, on August 21, 2014, she seized 2,000 pounds of marijuana being smuggled into the country under the command of LTJG Gregory Bernstein. During the summer of 2016 Terrapin patrolled Southeast Alaska.
