= Henry Blake (lighthouse keeper) =

Henry H. Blake (1837–1871) was the first New Dungeness Lighthouse keeper. Blake began his term after the New Dungeness Lighthouse was first lighted on December 14, 1857. Blake overcame the loneliness and dreariness associated with the profession of lighthouse keeping, serving for over a decade as the New Dungeness light's only attendant. He steadfastly kept the kerosene lantern lighted each night, and tolled the large bell constantly when fog rolled in to warn mariners away from the spit. In 1862 he married Mary Ann McDonnell. Blake is considered to be one of the first and best examples of commitment to mariners' safety.

A little known fact about Blake is how in 1868 he took in and cared for a pregnant Native American woman of the Tsimshian tribe after she and a group of her fellow tribesmen were ambushed by members of the Clallam tribe. Upon demands by the Clallam attackers to give up the pregnant woman, Blake refused. Later the Clallam attackers were punished, and the Tsimshian woman went home. It is said that in 1902 a Native American man came back to the lighthouse, paying his respects after explaining he was the baby inside the woman that night.

Blake and Mary Ann McDonnell had five children: Catherine, Richard, Clara, Mary and Hannah. The first three were born in the lighthouse.

A USCG coastal buoy tender WLM-563 based in Everett, Washington is named after him. The USCGC Henry Blake (WLM-563) honors his commitment to mariner safety in its name and motto, "The Keeper of Tradition."
