= Moresby =

Moresby can refer to:

== Places ==
- Port Moresby, the capital of Papua New Guinea
- Moresby, Cumbria, England
  - Low Moresby, a village in the parish of Moresby, Cumbria
  - Moresby Parks, a larger village in the parish of Moresby, Cumbria
- Moresby, Queensland, Australia
- Moresby, Western Australia, a locality near Geraldton
- Moresby Island, British Columbia, Canada
- Moresby Island (Gulf Islands), British Columbia
- Mount Moresby, British Columbia

== Other uses ==
- Moresby (surname)
- HMAS Moresby, two ships of the Royal Australian Navy
- HMCS Moresby
- HMS Moresby, ship of the Royal Navy
- SS Moresby
- Moresby Hall, a Grade I-listed building in Cumbria
- Moresby Parks railway station, a former station at Moresby Parks, in Moresby parish, Cumbria
- the Moresby Treaty, an anti-slavery treaty signed in 1822
