= HMCS Anticosti =

Several Canadian naval units have been named HMCS Anticosti.

- HMCS Anticosti (T274) (I) was an Isles-class trawler that served in the Royal Canadian Navy during the Second World War.
- HMCS Anticosti (MSA 110) (II) was an Anticosti-class minesweeper that served in the Canadian Forces during the 1990s.
