= Anticosti-class minesweeper =

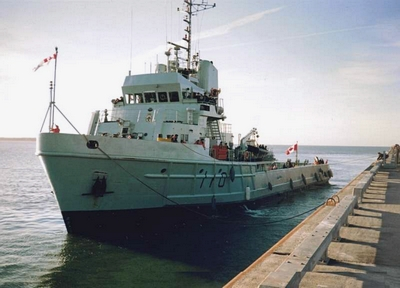
- HMCS Anticosti at Rimouski harbour in 2000

Class overview
- Name: Anticosti class
- Builders: Allied Shipbuilders Ltd., Vancouver
- Operators: Canadian Forces
- Preceded by: Bay-class minesweeper
- Succeeded by: Kingston-class coastal defence vessel
- Built: 1973
- In commission: May 1989 – 2000
- Completed: 2
- Retired: 2

General characteristics
- Type: Minesweeper auxiliary
- Displacement: 1,076 long tons (1,093 t) full load
- Length: 58.3 m (191 ft)
- Beam: 13.1 m (43 ft)
- Draught: 5.2 m (17 ft)
- Ice class: 3
- Installed power: 4,600 bhp (3,400 kW)
- Propulsion: 4 × NOHAB Polar diesels, 2 shafts; 1 × 575 bhp (429 kW) azimuth bow thruster
- Speed: 13.5 knots (25.0 km/h; 15.5 mph)
- Range: 12,000 nmi (22,000 km; 14,000 mi) at 13 knots (24 km/h; 15 mph)
- Complement: 23
- Sensors & processing systems: 2 × Racal Decca navigation radar (I band); Towed VDS side scan sonar

The Anticosti-class minesweepers were a class of minesweepers that served with the Canadian Forces from 1989–2000. The class consisted of two former oil rig supply vessels, Jean Tide and Joyce Tide. They were acquired by Maritime Command (MARCOM) and commissioned in May 1989 with Jean Tide becoming HMCS Anticosti (MSA 110) and Joyce Tide becoming HMCS Moresby (MSA 112). Once the Kingston-class coastal defence vessels became operational, the Anticosti class was discarded and the two ships returned to mercantile use.

== Design ==
Laid down as Lady Joyce and Lady Jean by Allied Shipbuilders Ltd. of Vancouver, the two ships of the class were initially constructed for use as offshore drill-rig supply vessels by International Offshore Services. Later renamed, they were purchased in 1988 by the Maritime Command of the Canadian Forces and converted into minesweepers. The vessels were 58.3 metres (191 ft 3 in) long overall with a beam of 13.1 metres (43 ft 0 in) and a draught of 5.2 metres (17 ft 1 in). Fully loaded, the ships of the class displaced 1,076 long tons (1,093 t).

The Anticosti class was powered by four NOHAB Polar SF 16RS diesel engines driving two shafts creating 4,600 horsepower (3,400 kW) and one 575 brake horsepower (429 kW) Gil Jet azimuth bow thruster. This created a maximum speed of 13.5 knots (25.0 km/h; 15.5 mph) and an endurance of 12,000 nautical miles (22,000 km; 14,000 mi) at 13 knots (24 km/h; 15 mph). The vessels had a complement of 5 officers and 18 ratings. The two ships of the class were equipped with two Racal Decca navigation radars operating on the I band. For minesweeping purposes, they were provided with mechanical minesweeping equipment and a high frequency, towed side scan variable depth sonar. The vessels were rated as ice class 3 and suitable for employment in light ice.

== Ships ==
Anticosti class
| Name | Builder | Completed | Commissioned | Paid off | Fate |
|---|---|---|---|---|---|
| Anticosti | Allied Shipbuilders Ltd. | 1973 | 7 May 1989 | 21 March 2000 | Sold for commercial use January 2002 |
| Moresby | Allied Shipbuilders Ltd. | 1973 | 1 January 1990 | 10 March 2000 | Sold for commercial use January 2002 |

== Service history ==
The two ships were constructed by Allied Shipbuilders Ltd. of Vancouver and named Joyce Tide and Jean Tide. After completion Jean Tide served as an oil rig logistics support vessel for International Offshore Service of Liberia. In 1975 she was sold to Tidewater Marine. Jean Tide remained with this company until her sale in 1988.

As part of the plan for the Naval Reserve to take over minesweeping and coastal operations, MARCOM began its effort to provide ships for training. MARCOM acquired two ships in March 1988. The ships were handed over for conversion by Fenco MacLaren Incorporated (later SNC-Lavalin Defence Programs Inc.) at Halifax, Nova Scotia and commissioned. Anticosti (formerly Jean Tide) was commissioned on 7 May 1989 with hull number MSA 110. Moresby (formerly Joyce Tide) entered service on 1 January 1990 with the hull number MSA 112.

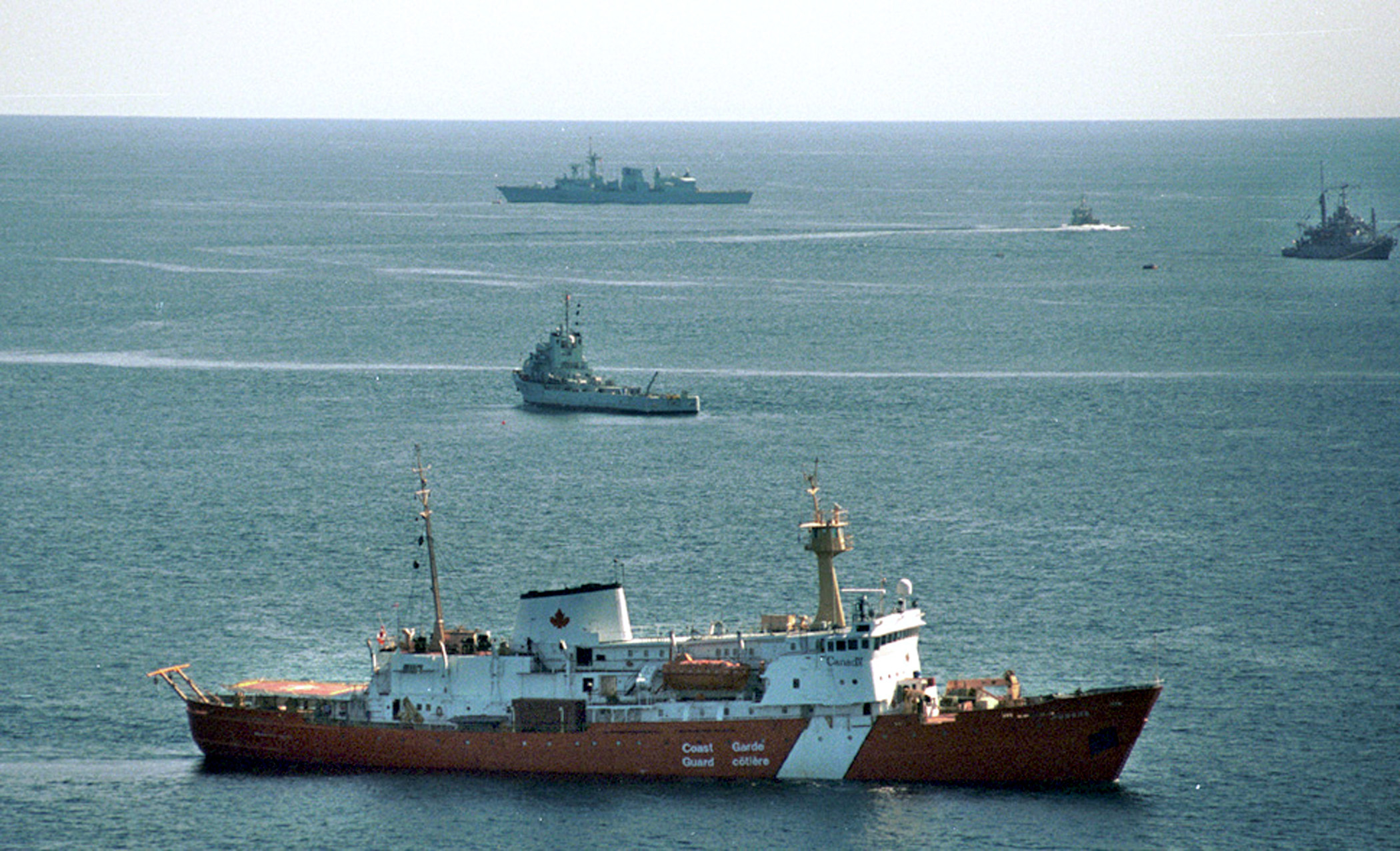
CCGS Hudson searches for Swissair Flight 111 debris with HMCS Anticosti (centre), USS Grapple (right), and a Halifax-class frigate (rear).

The vessels sailed to Marystown, Newfoundland for conversion. In April 1990 they had their mechanical sweep gear and sonar fitted. Anticosti was assigned to Maritime Forces Atlantic (MARLANT) as a minesweeping training vessel in preparation for the Maritime Coastal Defence Vessel Project (MCDV), which would become the Kingston class in the late 1990s. Anticosti was deployed by MARLANT in the annual MARCOT exercises as a minelayer. In March 1997, Moresby transferred to CFB Esquimalt.

During the investigation into the Swissair Flight 111 crash in September 1998, Anticosti was among the Maritime Command vessels that responded to the crash site. She among the many ships scoured the sea looking for the aircraft's black box as part of Operation "Persistence". In March 1999, Anticosti sailed with Kingston-class vessels Kingston and Glace Bay to the Baltic Sea to participate in the NATO naval exercise "Blue Game".

After the Kingston class entered service, the Anticosti class was identified as surplus and Moresby paid off on 10 March 2000. Anticosti paid off on 21 March 2000. They were sold to commercial interests in January 2002.
