= Reliance Foundry =

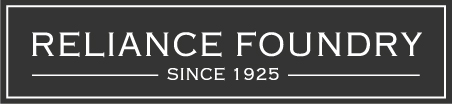
- Type: Private
- Industry: Manufacturing
- Founded: 1925; 101 years ago
- Founders: H. G. Ireland, Ray McDougall, Mike Engelbeen, Gerry Engelbeen
- Headquarters: Surrey, BC, Canada
- Area served: North America
- Key people: Shane Kramps (CEO)
- Products: Bollards, bike parking, wheels, metal casting
- Owner: Parmar Capital
- Number of employees: 45
- Website: www.reliance-foundry.com

Reliance Foundry Co. Ltd. is a private company based in Vancouver, Canada. The company was founded in 1925, and constitutes one of Canada's oldest metal casting supplier firms.

== History ==
Reliance Foundry was founded in 1925 in Vancouver, Canada, by Mike and Gerry Engelbeen, H. G. Ireland and Ray McDougal. The company constituted the first foundry in British Columbia to produce malleable iron, and in 1925 it received a contract to produce 225 cast iron streetlamp standards for the city of Vancouver.

In 1927, Fred Done was hired to construct a one-ton electrical furnace, which led to the Done family's involvement with the company. Gerry Engelbeen died in 1928 and left controlling interest of the foundry to the three remaining partners. In 1936, Fred Done purchased H. G. Ireland's and Ray McDougall's shares, entering a two-man partnership with Mike Engelbeen.

In 1938 the company worked with the Canadian Merchant Navy's Park Ships assembled at the West Coast Shipbuilders Ltd. (Allied Shipbuilders) Shipyard. In 1943 Fred Done became the sole owner of the company. In 1955, Done's sons, Brian and Barry, began working at Reliance Foundry, eventually succeeding Fred in 1963.

Reliance Foundry's workers formed an official union on February 17, 1965 when they gained official certification with the United Steel Workers of America, Local No. 2952. In 1966, a fire forced the company to relocate from 149 West 4th Avenue to Surrey, British Columbia.

In 1996, Reliance Foundry launched its first website, and in 1997 began outsourcing production to Asia. In 2003 all in-house casting operations ceased. A year later, Reliance Foundry sold their first Surrey location and transferred to its current location at 148th Street in Surrey, British Columbia. By 2012, Reliance Foundry was supplying to businesses and communities throughout North America, and the company was awarded the Surrey Board of Trade's Business Excellence Award for its economic performance.

In 2014 Reliance Foundry purchased Bike Box Canada, launching its bike locker product line. In September 2016, the company made the Profit 500 list, a ranking of Canada's fastest growing businesses. In 2016, Reliance Foundry was named as a finalist in the Grant Thornton and Canadian Chamber of Commerce Private Business Growth Awards.

In 2019, Reliance Foundry launched a new hardscape product line, including detectable warning plates, tree grates, and trench grates. All hardscape products are made from high-quality cast iron and withstand rigorous conditions with limited maintenance. Reliance Foundry hardscape products are designed and manufactured in the US, in compliance with the Buy American Act.
