= HMCS Goose Bay =

Royal Canadian Navy coastal defence vessel

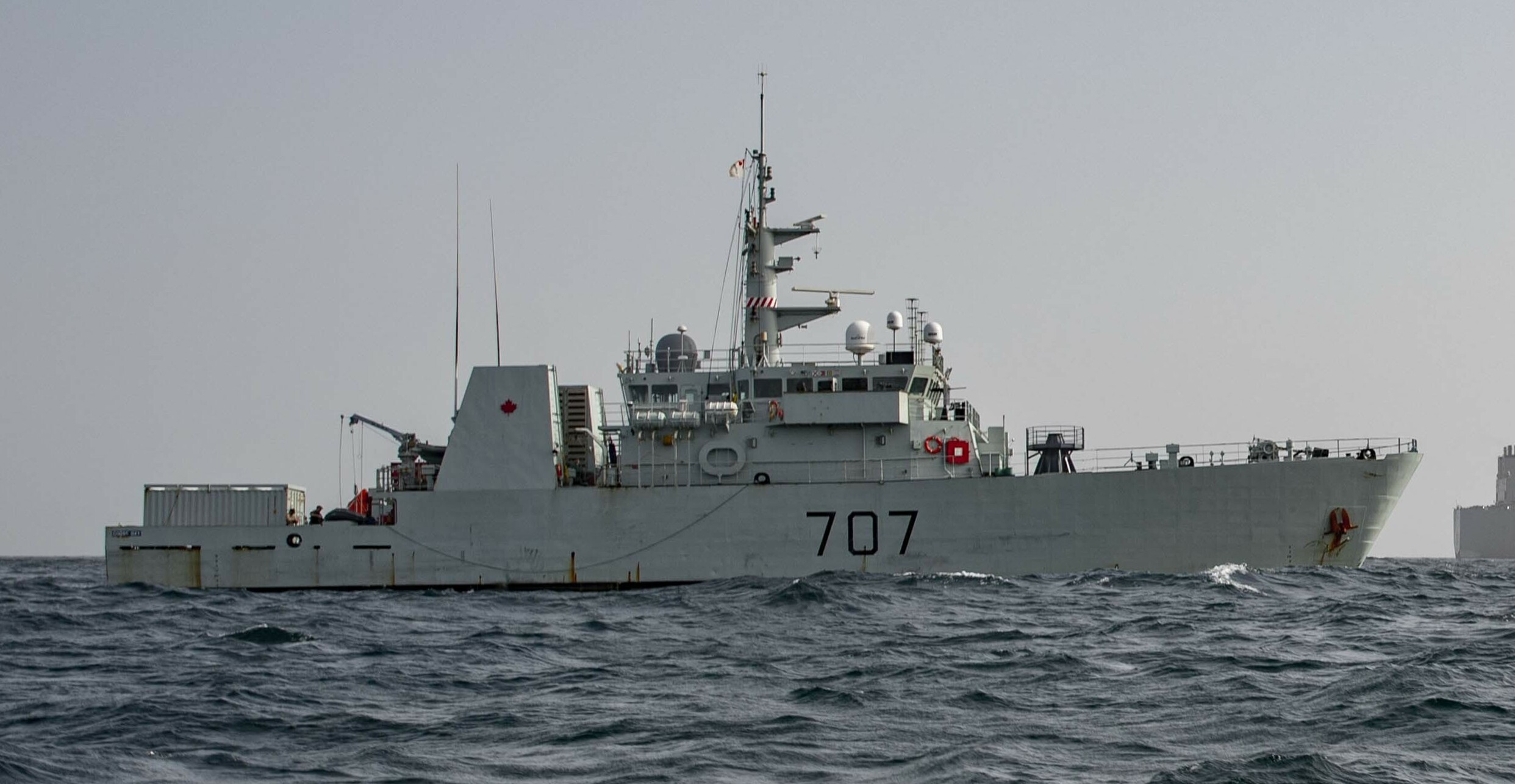
- HMCS Goose Bay in March 2022

History

Canada
- Name: Goose Bay
- Namesake: Goose Bay, Labrador
- Builder: Halifax Shipyards Ltd., Halifax, Nova Scotia
- Laid down: 22 February 1997
- Launched: 4 September 1997
- Commissioned: 26 July 1998
- Decommissioned: 3 October 2025
- Home port: CFB Halifax
- Identification: MMSI number: 316200000; Callsign: CGBV; Pennant number: MM 707
- Status: Decommissioned
- Badge

General characteristics
- Class & type: Kingston-class coastal defence vessel
- Displacement: 970 long tons (986 t)
- Length: 55.3 m (181 ft 5 in)
- Beam: 11.3 m (37 ft 1 in)
- Draught: 3.4 m (11 ft 2 in)
- Propulsion: 4 × Jeumont ANR-53-50 alternators, 4 × 600VAC Wärtsilä UD 23V12 diesel engines, 7.2 MW (9,700 hp); 2 × Jeumont CI 560L motors, 3,000 hp (2,200 kW); 2 × LIPS Z drive azimuth thrusters
- Speed: 15 knots (28 km/h; 17 mph)
- Range: 5,000 nmi (9,300 km; 5,800 mi) at 8 kn (15 km/h; 9.2 mph)
- Complement: 37
- Sensors & processing systems: Kelvin Hughes navigation radar (I-band); Kelvin Hughes 6000 surface search radar (E-F band); Global Positioning System; AN/SQS-511 towed side scan sonar; Remote-control Mine Hunting System (RMHS)
- Armament: 1 × Bofors 40 mm/60 Mk 5C gun; 2 × M2 machine guns

HMCS Goose Bay is a decommissioned Kingston-class coastal defence vessel that served in the Canadian Forces from 1998 to 2025. Goose Bay is the eighth ship of her class. She was the first vessel to be named Goose Bay. The coastal defence vessel was assigned to Maritime Forces Atlantic (MARLANT) and homeported at CFB Halifax.

== Design and description ==
The Kingston class was designed to fill the minesweeper, coastal patrol and reserve training needs of the Canadian Forces, replacing the Bay-class minesweepers, Porte-class gate vessels and Royal Canadian Mounted Police coastal launches in those roles. In order to perform these varied duties the Kingston-class vessels are designed to carry up to three 6.1-metre (20 ft) ISO containers with power hookups on the open deck aft in order to embark mission-specific payloads. The seven module types available for embarkation include four route survey, two mechanical minesweeping and one bottom inspection modules.

The Kingston class displace 970 long tons (986 t) and are 55.3 metres (181 ft 5 in) long overall with a beam 11.3 metres (37 ft 1 in) and a draught of 3.4 metres (11 ft 2 in). The coastal defence vessels are powered by four Jeumont ANR-53-50 alternators coupled to four Wärtsilä UD 23V12 diesel engines creating 7.2 megawatts (9,700 hp). Two LIPS Z-drive azimuth thrusters are driven by two Jeumont CI 560L motors creating 3,000 horsepower (2,200 kW) and the Z drives can be rotated 360°. This gives the ships a maximum speed of 15 knots (28 km/h; 17 mph) and a range of 5,000 nautical miles (9,300 km; 5,800 mi) at 8 knots (15 km/h; 9.2 mph).

The Kingston class is equipped with a Kelvin Hughes navigational radar using the I band and a Kelvin Hughes 6000 surface search radar scanning the E and F bands. The vessels carry an AN/SQS-511 towed side scan sonar for minesweeping and a Remote-control Mine Hunting System (RMHS). The vessels are equipped with one Bofors 40 mm/60 calibre Mk 5C gun and two M2 machine guns. (Note: The 60 calibre denotes the length of the gun. This means that the length of the gun barrel is 60 times the bore diameter.) The 40 mm gun was declared obsolete and removed from the vessels in 2014. Some of them ended up as museum pieces and on display at naval reserve installations across Canada. The Kingston-class coastal defence vessels have a complement of 37.

== Service history ==
Goose Bay's keel was laid down on 22 February 1997 by Halifax Shipyards Ltd. at Halifax, Nova Scotia and was launched on 4 September 1997. The ship was commissioned into the Canadian Forces on 26 July 1998 at Happy Valley-Goose Bay, Newfoundland and Labrador and carries the hull number MM 707.

In Fall 2000, the coastal defence vessel took part in the naval exercise Unified Spirit off the east coast of North America. From 23 April to 9 May 2001, Goose Bay, accompanied by sister ship Moncton, took part in the NATO naval exercise Blue Game off the coasts of Norway and Denmark. In August 2002, Goose Bay and sister ship Summerside sailed to Arctic waters as part of Operation Narwhal Ranger, a military exercise involving all arms of the Canadian Forces. This marked the first Arctic visit by naval vessels in thirteen years.

In August 2010 Goose Bay participated in Operation Nanook 2010, in the Canadian Arctic. This was the fourth annual joint exercise, and the first where foreign vessels participated. In 2012, the vessel deployed as part of Operation Caribbe, Canada's participation in the war on drugs.

In February 2015, Goose Bay was deployed again to Operation Caribbe. In March 2015, as part of Operation Caribbe, Goose Bay, along with sister ship Shawinigan and the US Navy frigate USS Kauffman, intercepted a vessel in the Caribbean Sea carrying 1,017 kilograms (2,242 lb) of cocaine. On 8 September 2015, Goose Bay deployed for large NATO naval exercises Joint Warrior and Trident Venture with Athabaskan, Windsor, Montréal, Halifax and Summerside. In the summer of 2016, Goose Bay was sent on a goodwill tour of the Great Lakes, making several port visits. In July, Goose Bay visited her namesake port. In September Goose Bay was among the Canadian warships deployed to the NATO naval training exercise "Cutlass Fury" off the east coast of North America.

In June 2017, Goose Bay returned to the Great Lakes and Saint Lawrence Seaway for a goodwill tour, making several port visits. In August Montréal and Goose Bay and sister ship Kingston departed Halifax to take part in the Operation Nanook in Canada's northern waters.

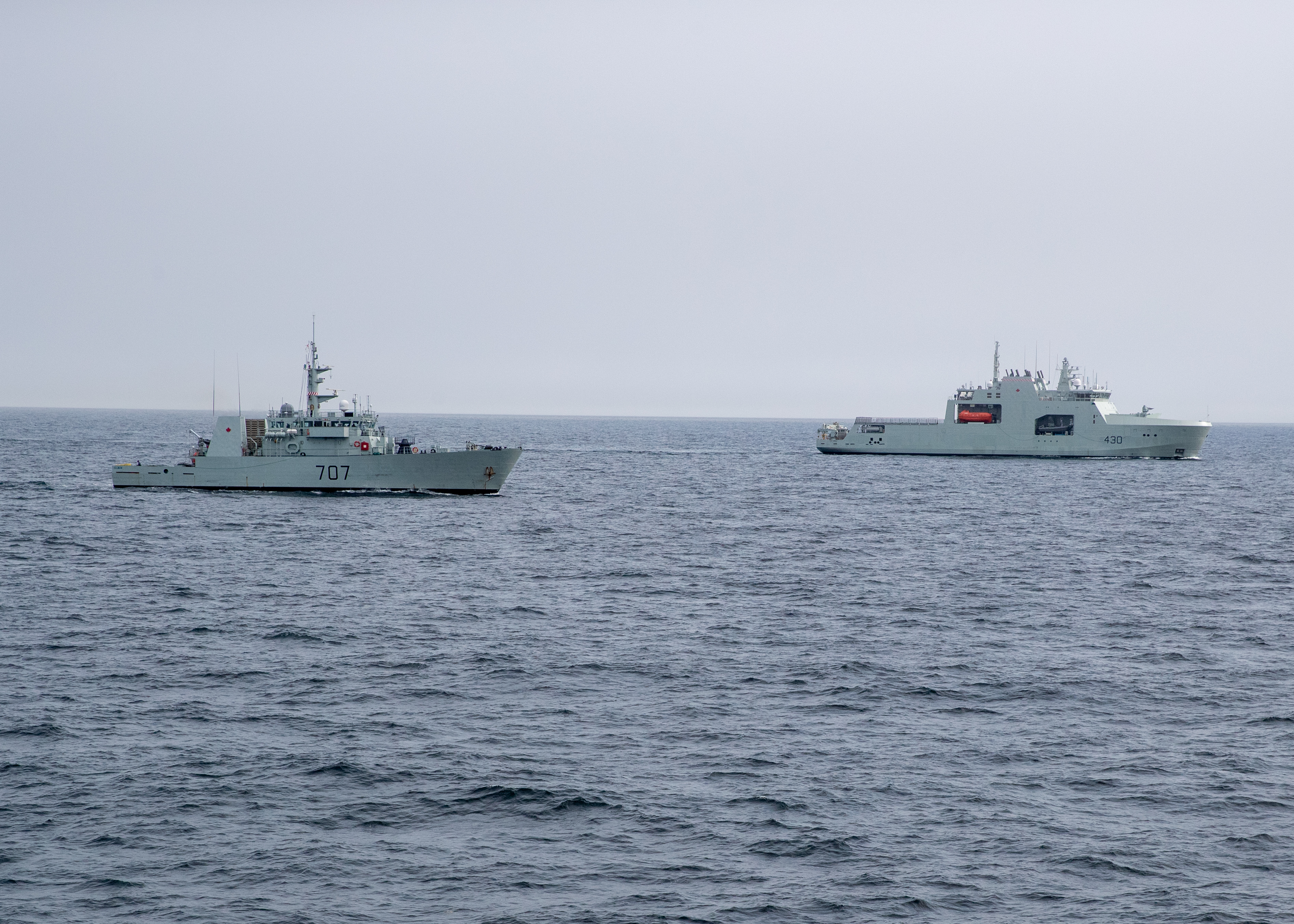
Goose Bay and HMCS Harry DeWolf in preparation for Operation Nanook, August 2021

In 2019, Goose Bay sailed to the Caribbean to take part in the naval exercise Tradewinds, training with other nation's navies from the area. In 2021, Goose Bay and HMCS Harry DeWolf took part in Operation Nanook. Goose Bay was among the ships deployed to the Arctic for Operation Nanook in August 2022. In September 2022, Goose Bay was tasked for hurricane relief efforts, after Hurricane Fiona's devastating impact to the Maritimes.

In July 2025 it was announced that Goose Bay and seven of her sister ships would be decommissioned before the end of the year. The ship was decommissioned on 3 October 2025 at Halifax.
