= HMCS Shawinigan =

Several Canadian naval units have been named HMCS Shawinigan.

- HMCS Shawinigan (K136) (I), a Flower-class corvette that served in the Royal Canadian Navy and was lost during the Battle of the Atlantic.
- HMCS Shawinigan (MM 704) (II), a Kingston-class coastal defence vessel in the Canadian Forces, commissioned in 1997.

== Battle honours ==
- Atlantic, 1942–44.
- Gulf of St. Lawrence, 1942, 1944.
