= HMCS Summerside =

Several Canadian naval units have been named HMCS Summerside.

- HMCS Summerside (K141) (I), a Flower-class corvette that served in the Royal Canadian Navy during the Battle of the Atlantic.
- HMCS Summerside (MM 711) (II), a Kingston-class coastal defence vessel in the Canadian Forces, commissioned in 1999.

== Battle honours ==
Vessels with the name of HMCS Summerside have earned the following battle honours. Battle honours are inherited by ships of the same name.

- Atlantic, 1941–44.
- Gulf of St. Lawrence, 1942, 1944.
- Normandy, 1944.
- English Channel, 1944–45.
