= HMCS Anticosti (MSA 110) =

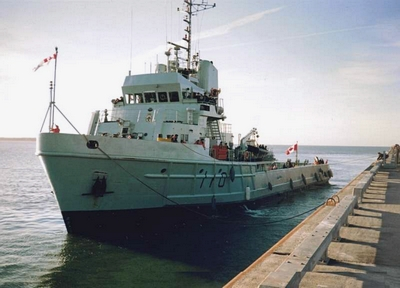
- HMCS Anticosti at Rimouski harbour summer 2000

History
- Name: Lady Jean
- Operator: International Offshore Service; Tidewater Marine
- Port of registry: (Liberia) Monrovia
- Builder: Allied Shipbuilders Ltd., Vancouver
- Launched: 17 April 1973
- Completed: 25 September 1973
- In service: 1973
- Renamed: Jean Tide (1974)
- Identification: IMO number: 7314723
- Fate: Sold to Canadian Forces in March 1988

Canada
- Name: Anticosti
- Namesake: Anticosti Island
- Acquired: March 1988
- Commissioned: 7 May 1989
- Decommissioned: 21 March 2000
- Home port: CFB Halifax
- Identification: Pennant number: MSA 110; IMO number: 7314723
- Fate: Sold for commercial use

General characteristics as minesweeper
- Class & type: Anticosti-class minesweeper
- Displacement: 1,093 t (1,076 long tons); 2,200 t (2,200 long tons) deep load)
- Length: 58.3 m (191 ft 3 in)
- Beam: 13.1 m (43 ft 0 in)
- Draught: 5.2 m (17 ft 1 in)
- Propulsion: 4 × NOHAB Polar diesels (3,100 kW (4,200 bhp)), 2 shafts, Kort nozzles; 1 × 410 kW (550 bhp) azimuth bow thruster
- Speed: 13.5 knots (25.0 km/h; 15.5 mph)
- Endurance: 12,000 nmi (22,000 km; 14,000 mi)
- Complement: 23

HMCS Anticosti was an Anticosti-class minesweeper that served in the Canadian Forces from 1989 to 2000. Originally an oil rig support vessel, she was purchased in 1989 and saw service until the entry of the newer Kingston-class coastal defence vessels. The ship was named for Anticosti Island, the second to bear the name. Following her Canadian naval career, Anticosti was sold to commercial interests.

== Design ==
The ship was initially constructed for use as an offshore drill-rig supply vessel by International Offshore Services. As a supply vessel, Jean Tide was 1,076 tonnes (1,059 long tons) with a deadweight tonnage of 1,196 tons. She was 58.3 metres (191 ft 3 in) long overall and 51.7 metres (169 ft 7 in) between perpendiculars with a beam of 13.1 metres (43 ft 0 in) and a draught of 5.2 metres (17 ft 1 in). The Anticosti class was powered by four NOHAB Polar SF 16RS diesel engines driving two shafts creating 4,600 horsepower (3,400 kW) and one 575 brake horsepower (429 kW) Gil Jet azimuth bow thruster. This created a maximum speed of 13.5 knots (25.0 km/h; 15.5 mph) and an endurance of 12,000 nautical miles (22,000 km; 14,000 mi) at 13 knots (24 km/h; 15 mph). The vessels were rated as ice class 3 and suitable for employment in light ice.

The vessel was purchased in 1988 by Maritime Command (MARCOM) of the Canadian Forces and converted into a minesweeping auxiliary. Anticosti had astern refuelling gear fitted in 1995. In military use the vessels had a complement of 5 officers and 18 ratings. The two ships of the class were equipped two Racal Decca navigation radars operating on the I band. For minesweeping purposes, they were provided with mechanical minesweeping equipment and a high frequency, towed side scan variable depth sonar.

== Service history ==
The ship was laid down as Lady Jean by Allied Shipbuilders Ltd. of Vancouver with the yard number 182 and launched on 17 April 1973. The vessel was renamed Jean Tide in 1974. After completion the vessel served as the oil rig logistics support vessel Jean Tide for International Offshore Service of Liberia. In 1975 she was sold to Tidewater Marine. The ship remained with this company until her sale in 1988.

As part of the plan for the Naval Reserve to take over minesweeping and coastal operations, MARCOM began its effort to provide ships for training. MARCOM acquired two ships, one being Jean Tide in March 1988. The ship was sailed from Europe to Canada for conversion by Finco Mclaren Incorporated at Halifax, Nova Scotia and commissioning. Anticosti was commissioned on 7 May 1989 with hull number MSA 110. Her homeport was at Halifax.

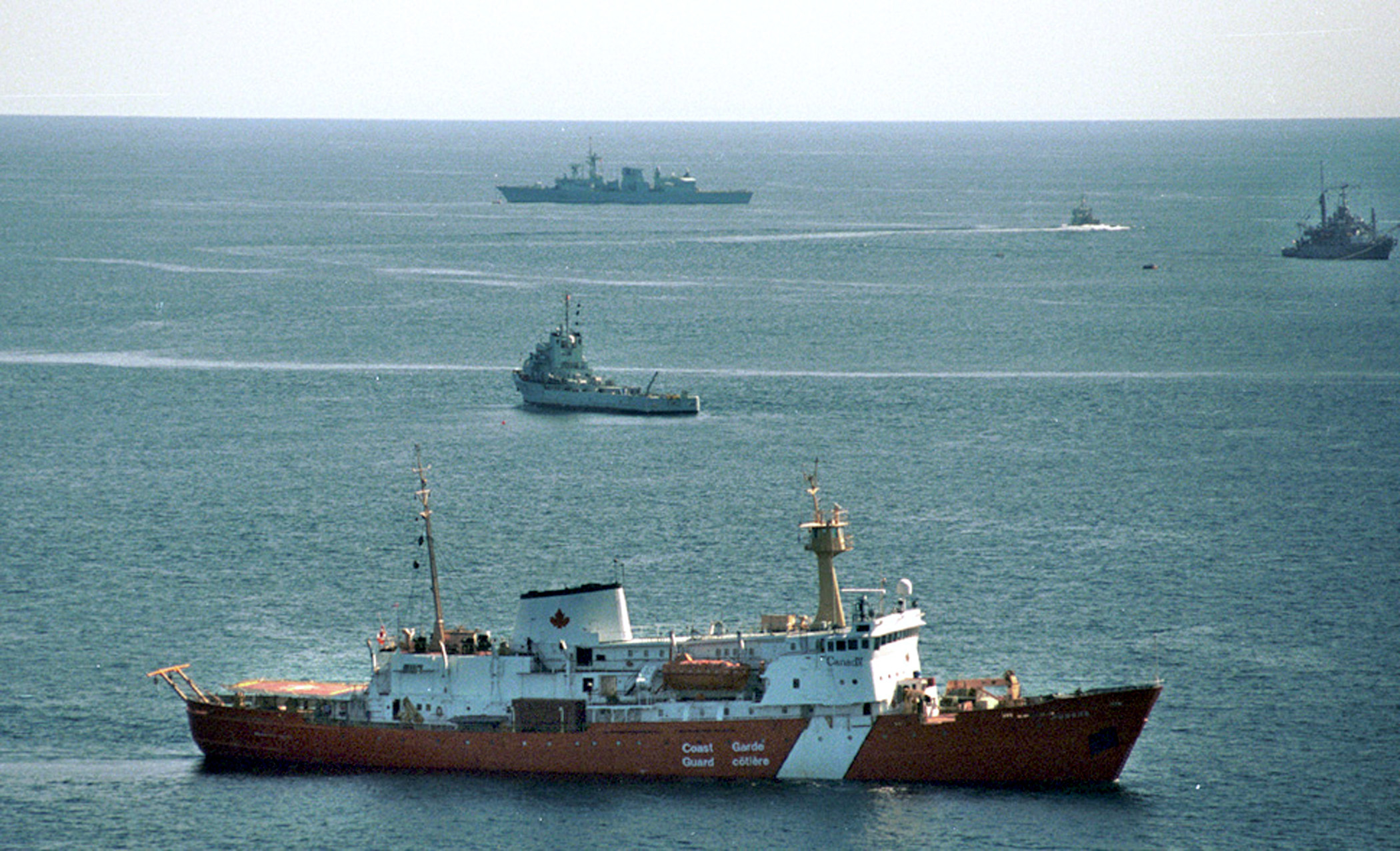
CCGS Hudson searches for Swissair Flight 111 debris with HMCS Anticosti (centre), USS Grapple (right), and a Halifax-class frigate (rear).

The vessel sailed to Marystown, Newfoundland for conversion in 1991. On 3 September 1991, Anticosti performed a goodwill tour of the St. Lawrence River and the Great Lakes. Anticosti was assigned to Maritime Forces Atlantic (MARLANT) as a minesweeping training vessel in preparation for the Maritime Coastal Defence Vessel Project (MCDV), which would become the Kingston class in the late 1990s. Anticosti was deployed by MARLANT in the annual MARCOT exercises as a minelayer.

During the investigation into the Swissair Flight 111 crash in September 1998, Anticosti was among the Maritime Command vessels that responded to the crash site. She among the many ships scoured the sea looking for the aircraft's black box as part of Operation "Persistence". In March 1999, the ship sailed with Kingston-class vessels Kingston and Glace Bay to the Baltic Sea to participate in the NATO naval exercise "Blue Game".

After the Kingston class entered service, Anticosti was identified as surplus and paid off on 21 March 2000. She was sold to commercial interests in January 2002.

Anticosti left Halifax in tow of Escort Protector on 10 December 2001 for Clarenville, Newfoundland for the ship's new owners, Star Line Inc. and it was registered without change of name in 2002. The ownership of the vessel has since passed to Cape Harrison Marine of St. John's. The ship has been available for a variety offshore duties including research. As of 2011 Anticosti is a research vessel (IMO 7314723) working in Newfoundland.
