= Fulford Harbour =

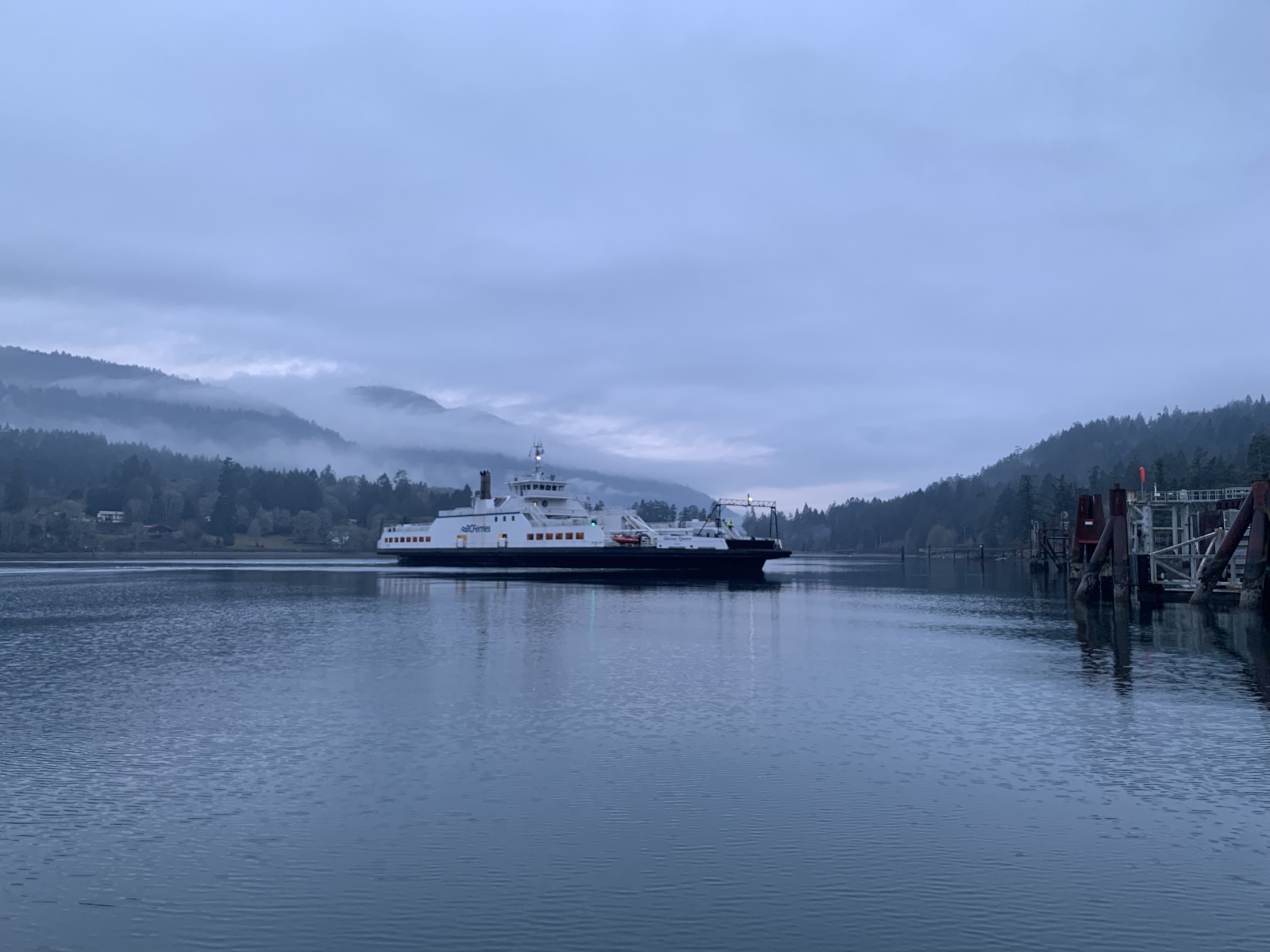
- Skeena Queen approaching Fulford terminal

- Location of Fulford Harbour in British Columbia
- Coordinates: 48°46′0″N 123°27′0″W
- Country: Canada
- Province: British Columbia
- District: Capital
- Time zone: UTC−07:00 (Pacific Time)
- Area codes: 250, 778

Fulford Harbour is a residential community on the southeast side of Salt Spring Island, British Columbia, located near the island's southern end. Fulford Harbour is the site of a BC Ferries terminal with regular ferry service to Swartz Bay on Vancouver Island. Fulford was named for Captain John Fulford of HMS Ganges which was the flagship of the Pacific Station from 1857 to 1860.

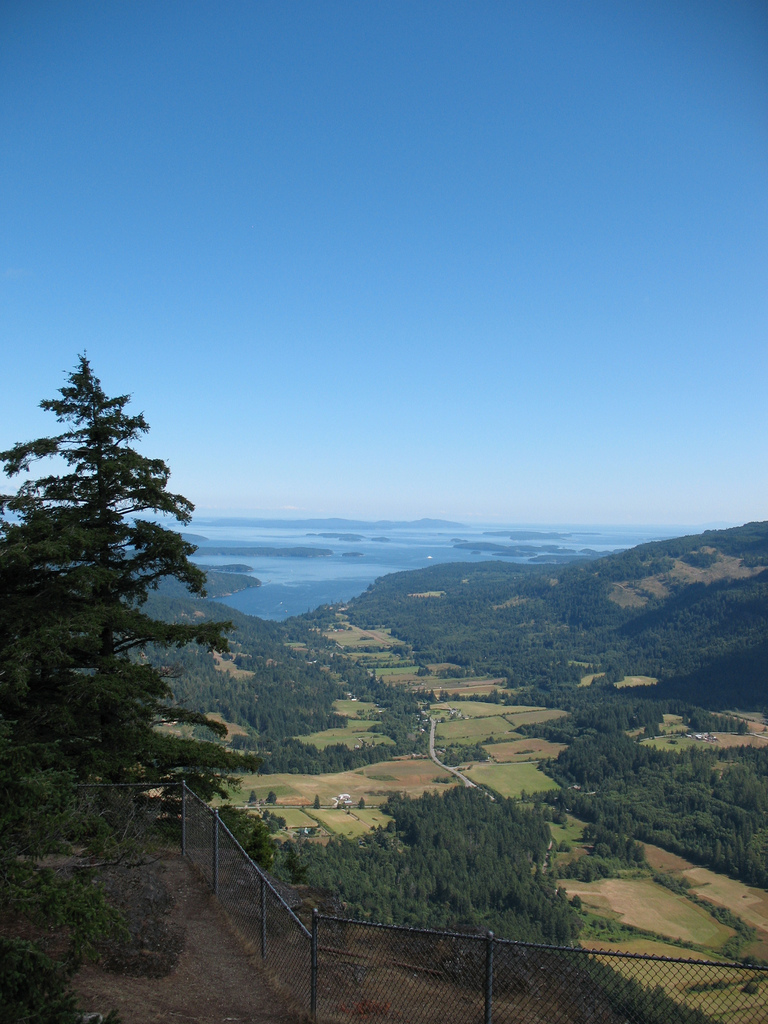
Fulford Harbour

== See also ==
- Ganges, British Columbia
