= Skeena Queen =

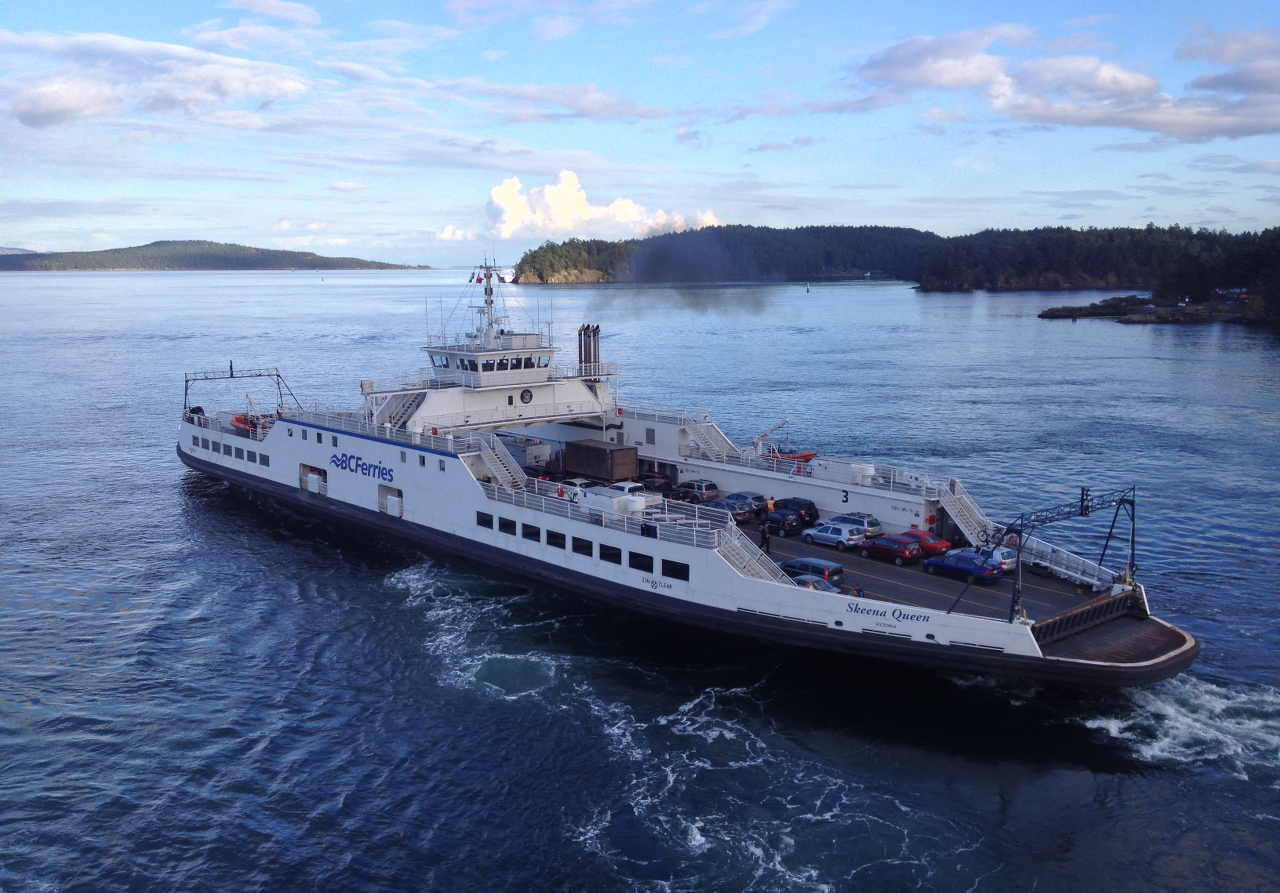
- Skeena Queen

Class overview
- Name: Skeena Queen
- Builders: Allied Shipbuilders, North Vancouver
- Operators: BC Ferries
- Built: 1997
- Planned: 3
- Completed: 1
- Active: 1

Skeena Queen is a BC Ferries ferry in British Columbia, Canada. She runs solely on the Swartz Bay-Saltspring Island (at Fulford Harbour) route.

== Design and construction ==
She was built in 1997 and named after the Skeena River. She was intended to be part of a class of spartan, utilitarian ferries, in the "Century ferry class", designed by the naval architects McLaren and Sons In 1994 the 10-year plan of BC Ferries called for construction of three Century-class ferries, to service the busier Gulf Island routes in British Columbia operated by BC Ferries. The name for the class was derived from the capacity, which is approximately 100 cars. However, the only ferry of the class actually built was Skeena Queen.

There is some speculation as to why the other two vessels in the class were not built. The obvious reason is that the high speed ferry program consumed all available funds. Others point to the problems with the four owner selected main propulsion engines that plagued Skeena Queen following commission, including excessively high noise levels and cylinder counterbore cracking in the high-speed engines. On April 15, 2002 Skeena Queen was removed from service and her four high-speed Mitsubishi S12R diesel engines were replaced with four Mitsubishi medium-speed engines, model S6U. The new engines were provided by Mitsubishi at an undisclosed price.

Skeena Queen has the following characteristics:

- Overall length: 110.0 m
- Gross tonnage: 2,453
- Vehicle capacity: 100 spaces 17.5 feet long by 8.5 feet wide
- Passenger and crew capacity: 450
- Service Speed: 14.5 knots (16.7 mph; 26.9 km/h) at 3500 bhp
- Installed Power: 5,040 hp (3.8 MW)

Skeena Queen has very little cabin space because the Century ferry class was intended to be used on short commuter runs of less than a half-hour duration where most of the passengers stay in their vehicles. Skeena Queen operates solely on the route between Swartz Bay and Fulford Harbour, which is a 35-minute crossing.

== History ==
In 1998, the ferry operated for a brief four-day trial on the Horseshoe Bay to Bowen Island run from April 23 to April 26, 1998 and providing partial coverage between Swartz Bay and Pender Island in Spring of 2018 due to another vessel being removed from service for repairs).

In 2015, the ferry had mechanical failure and was briefly out of service.
