= HMCS Shawinigan (MM 704) =

Royal Canadian Navy coastal defence vessel

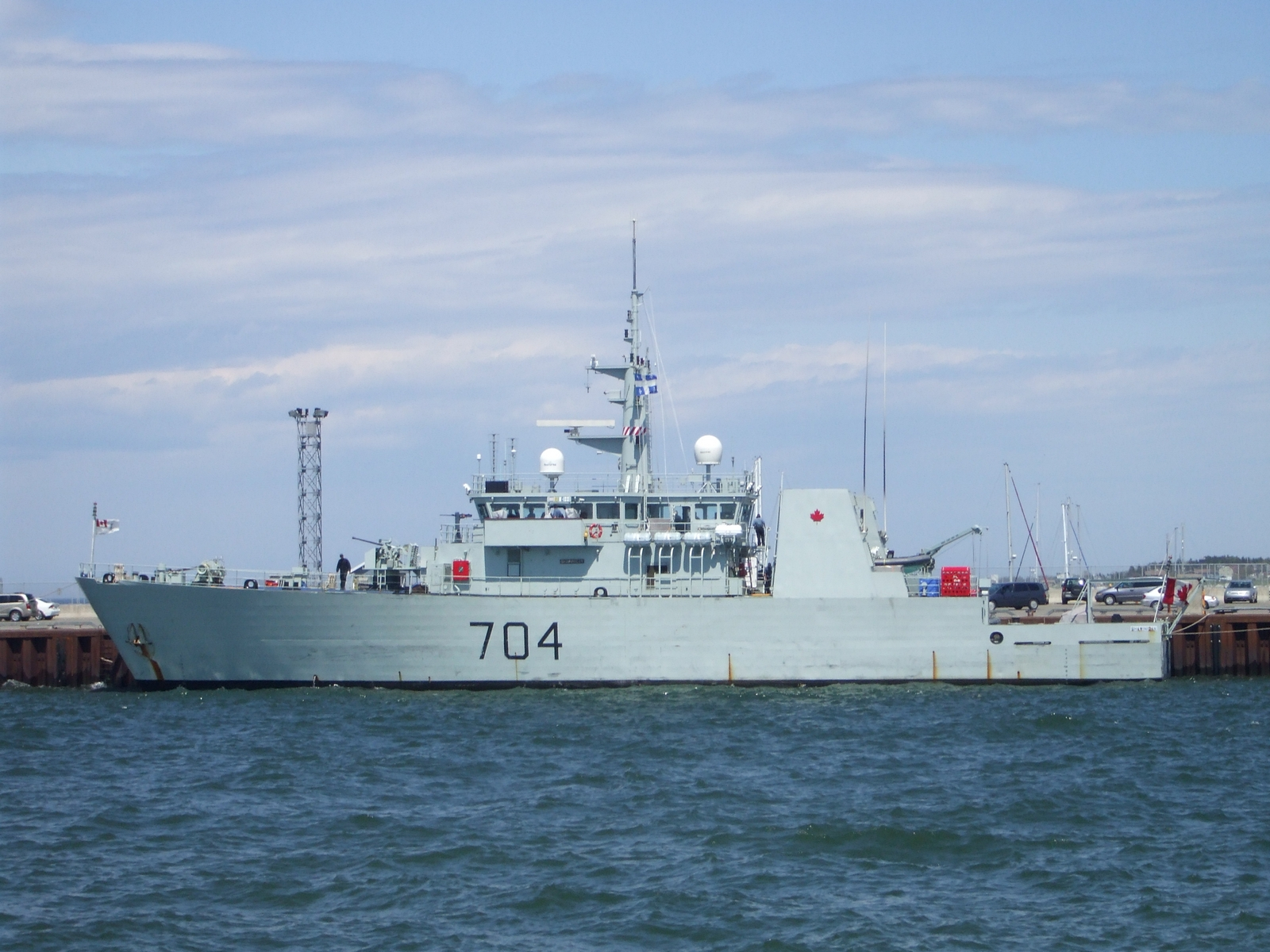
- HMCS Shawinigan at Rimouski in 2009

History

Canada
- Name: Shawinigan
- Namesake: Shawinigan, Quebec
- Builder: Halifax Shipyards Ltd., Halifax, Nova Scotia
- Laid down: 26 April 1996
- Launched: 15 November 1996
- Commissioned: 14 June 1997
- Decommissioned: 3 October 2025
- Home port: CFB Halifax
- Identification: Pennant number: MM 704; MMSI number: 316296000; Callsign: CGAX
- Honours and awards: Atlantic, 1942–44; Gulf of St. Lawrence, 1942, 1944
- Status: Decommissioned

General characteristics
- Class & type: Kingston-class coastal defence vessel
- Displacement: 970 long tons (986 t)
- Length: 55.3 m (181 ft 5 in)
- Beam: 11.3 m (37 ft 1 in)
- Draught: 3.4 m (11 ft 2 in)
- Propulsion: 4 × Jeumont ANR-53-50 alternators, 4 × 600VAC Wärtsilä UD 23V12 diesel engines, 7.2 MW (9,700 hp); 2 × Jeumont CI 560L motors, 2,200 kW (3,000 hp); 2 × LIPS Z drive azimuth thrusters
- Speed: 15 knots (28 km/h; 17 mph)
- Range: 5,000 nmi (9,300 km; 5,800 mi) at 8 kn (15 km/h; 9.2 mph)
- Complement: 37
- Sensors & processing systems: Kelvin Hughes navigation radar (I-band); Kelvin Hughes 6000 surface search radar (E-F band); Global Positioning System; AN/SQS-511 towed side scan sonar; Remote-control Mine Hunting System (RMHS)
- Armament: 1 × Bofors 40 mm/60 Mk 5C gun; 2 × M2 machine guns

HMCS Shawinigan is a decommissioned Kingston-class coastal defence vessel that served in the Canadian Forces and the Royal Canadian Navy from 1997 to 2025. Shawinigan is the fifth ship of her class. She was the second vessel to use the designation HMCS Shawinigan. The ship was assigned to Maritime Forces Atlantic (MARLANT) and homeported at CFB Halifax.

== Design and description ==
The Kingston class was designed to fill the minesweeper, coastal patrol and reserve training needs of the Canadian Forces, replacing the Bay-class minesweepers, Porte-class gate vessels and Royal Canadian Mounted Police coastal launches in those roles. In order to perform these varied duties the Kingston-class vessels are designed to carry up to three 6.1-metre (20 ft) ISO containers with power hookups on the open deck aft in order to embark mission-specific payloads. The seven module types available for embarkation include four route survey, two mechanical minesweeping and one bottom inspection modules.

The Kingston class displace 970 long tons (986 t) and are 55.3 metres (181 ft 5 in) long overall with a beam 11.3 metres (37 ft 1 in) and a draught of 3.4 metres (11 ft 2 in). The coastal defence vessels are powered by four Jeumont ANR-53-50 alternators coupled to four Wärtsilä UD 23V12 diesel engines creating 7.2 megawatts (9,700 hp). Two LIPS Z-drive azimuth thrusters are driven by two Jeumont CI 560L motors creating 2,200 kilowatts (3,000 hp) and the Z drives can be rotated 360°. This gives the ships a maximum speed of 15 knots (28 km/h; 17 mph) and a range of 5,000 nautical miles (9,300 km; 5,800 mi) at 8 knots (15 km/h; 9.2 mph).

The Kingston class is equipped with a Kelvin Hughes navigational radar using the I band and a Kelvin Hughes 6000 surface search radar scanning the E and F bands. The vessels carry an AN/SQS-511 towed side scan sonar for minesweeping and a Remote-control Mine Hunting System (RMHS). The vessels are equipped with one Bofors 40 mm/60 calibre Mk 5C gun and two M2 machine guns. (Note: The 60 calibre denotes the length of the gun. This means that the length of the gun barrel is 60 times the bore diameter.) The 40 mm gun was declared obsolete and removed from the vessels in 2014. Some of them ended up as museum pieces and on display at naval reserve installations across Canada. The Kingston-class coastal defence vessels have a complement of 37.

== Operational history ==
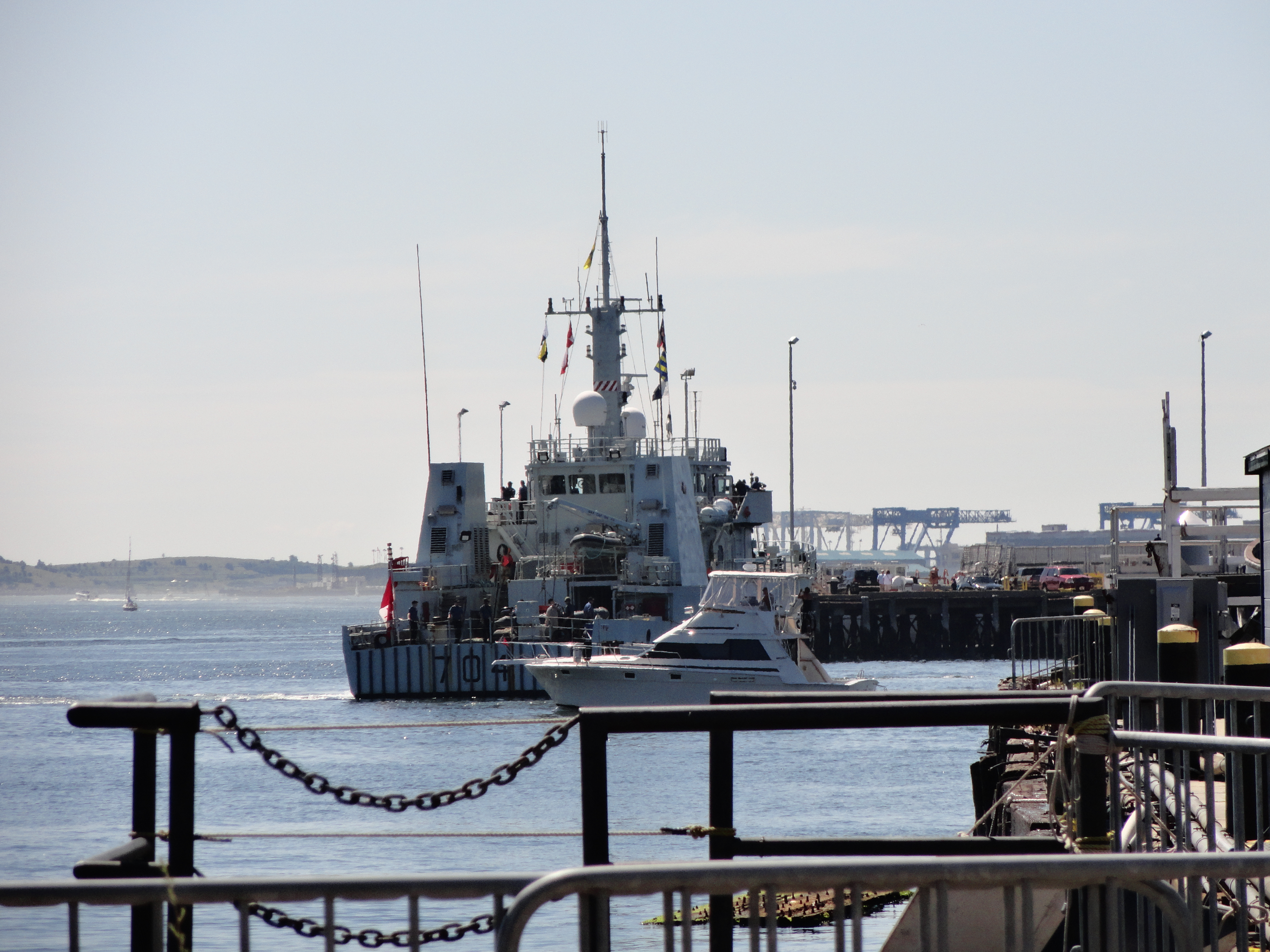
The ship in Boston Harbor

Shawinigan was laid down on 26 April 1996 by Halifax Shipyards Ltd. at Halifax, Nova Scotia, and was launched on 15 November 1996. The ship was commissioned into the Canadian Forces on 14 June 1997 at Trois Rivières, Quebec and carries the hull number MM 704. After commissioning she was assigned to Atlantic fleet. On 28 June 1998 Shawinigan took part in the 75th anniversary of the naval reserves at Halifax and was featured on a commemorative stamp issued for the event.

In August 2014, Shawinigan took part in Operation Nanook, an annual joint military exercise performed in northern Canada. During that deployment, Shawinigan set the record for traveling the furthest north of any ship in the history of the Royal Canadian Navy, reaching a maximum latitude of 80 degrees and 28 minutes north. In March 2015, as part of Operation Caribbe, Shawinigan, along with sister ship Goose Bay and the US frigate USS Kauffman, intercepted a vessel in the Caribbean Sea carrying 1,017 kilograms (2,242 lb) of cocaine.

In August 2016, the ship sailed with Moncton to the Arctic to take part in Operation Nanook. Once the operation is over, Shawinigan partnered with the Canadian Coast Guard vessel CCGS Sir Wilfrid Laurier to continue the archaeological examination of the sunken vessel HMS Erebus and to aid in the search for HMS Terror. Shawinigan and Moncton returned to Halifax on 30 September. On 22 January 2019, Shawinigan and sister ship Kingston departed Halifax for operations off West Africa as part of Operation Projection, working with African nations as well as the United States, United Kingdom and France. The vessels returned to Halifax on 26 April.

On 26 January 2020, Shawinigan and Glace Bay departed Halifax as part of Operation Projection off West Africa. Once there, the two vessels took part in two naval exercises Obangame Express and Phoenix Express. Due to the COVID-19 pandemic, their mission was cut short and the vessels were recalled, returning to Halifax on 9 April.

In June 2021, Shawinigan was deployed to the Caribbean under the command of Cdr Bill Sanson as part of Operation Caribbe. On 18 July, the ship seized 675 kg (1,488 lb) of cocaine from a small smuggling vessel, followed by the interception of another small boat on 21 July, capturing 774 kg (1,706 lb). The ship returned to Halifax in August. In July 2023, Shawinigan and sister ship Summerside were deployed to the North Atlantic Ocean and Baltic Sea as part of Operation Reassurance for mine-clearing operations. They returned to Halifax in November.

In July 2025 it was announced that Shawinigan and seven of her sister ships would be decommissioned before the end of the year. The ship was decommissioned on 3 October 2025 at Halifax. The ship was decommissioned on 3 October 2025 at Halifax.
