= HMCS Summerside (MM 711) =

Royal Canadian Navy coastal defence vessel

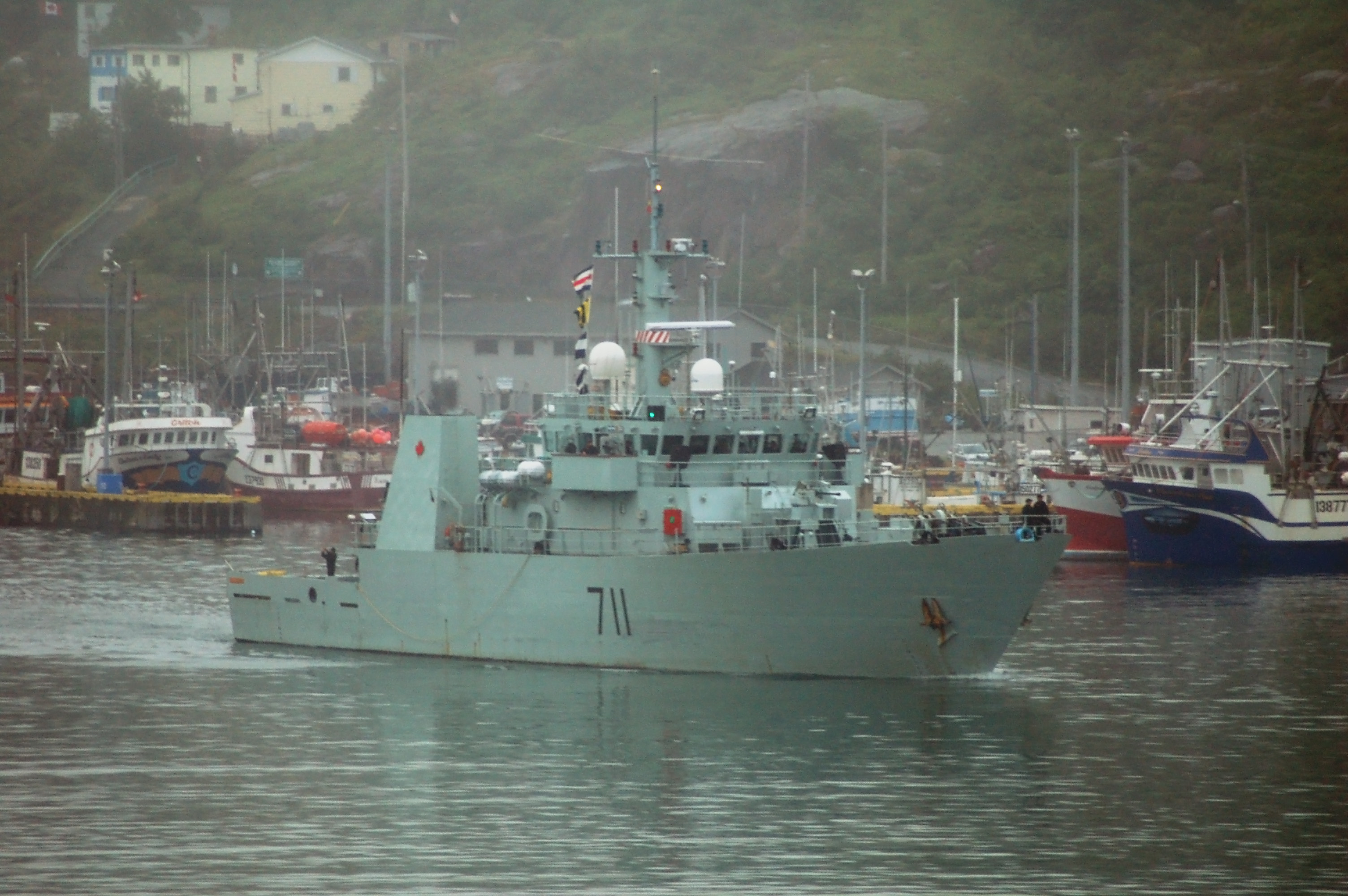
- HMCS Summerside entering St. John's Harbour

History

Canada
- Name: Summerside
- Namesake: Summerside, Prince Edward Island
- Builder: Halifax Shipyards Ltd., Halifax, Nova Scotia
- Laid down: 28 March 1998
- Launched: 25 September 1998
- Commissioned: 18 July 1999
- Decommissioned: 3 October 2025
- Stricken: 3 October 2025
- Home port: CFB Halifax
- Identification: Pennant number: MM 711; MMSI number: 316295000
- Motto: Spem Successus Alit (Success nourishes hope)
- Honours and awards: Atlantic, 1941–44; Gulf of St. Lawrence, 1942, 1944; Normandy, 1944; English Channel, 1944–45
- Status: Awaiting recycling
- Notes: Colours: Gold and red

General characteristics
- Class & type: Kingston-class coastal defence vessel
- Displacement: 970 long tons (986 t)
- Length: 55.3 m (181 ft 5 in)
- Beam: 11.3 m (37 ft 1 in)
- Draught: 3.4 m (11 ft 2 in)
- Propulsion: 4 × Jeumont ANR-53-50 alternators, 4 × 600VAC Wärtsilä UD 23V12 diesel engines, 7.2 MW (9,700 hp); 2 × Jeumont CI 560L motors, 3,000 hp (2,200 kW); 2 × LIPS Z drive azimuth thrusters
- Speed: 15 knots (28 km/h; 17 mph)
- Range: 5,000 nmi (9,300 km; 5,800 mi) at 8 kn (15 km/h; 9.2 mph)
- Complement: 37
- Sensors & processing systems: Kelvin Hughes navigation radar (I-band); Kelvin Hughes 6000 surface search radar (E-F band); Global Positioning System; AN/SQS-511 towed side scan sonar; Remote-control Mine Hunting System (RMHS)
- Armament: 1 × Bofors 40 mm/60 Mk 5C gun (removed from the class); 2 × M2 machine guns

HMCS Summerside is a decommissioned Kingston-class coastal defence vessel that served in the Royal Canadian Navy from 1999 to 2025. Summerside is the twelfth, and last, ship of her class. She was the second vessel to use the designation HMCS Summerside. She was assigned to Maritime Forces Atlantic (MARLANT) and homeported at CFB Halifax.

== Design and description ==
The Kingston class was designed to fill the minesweeper, coastal patrol and reserve training needs of the Canadian Forces, replacing the Bay-class minesweepers, Porte-class gate vessels and Royal Canadian Mounted Police coastal launches in those roles. In order to perform these varied duties the Kingston-class vessels are designed to carry up to three 20-foot (6.1 m) ISO containers with power hookups on the open deck aft in order to embark mission-specific payloads. The seven module types available for embarkation include four route survey, two mechanical minesweeping and one bottom inspection modules.

The Kingston class displace 970 long tons (986 t) and are 55.3 metres (181 ft 5 in) long overall with a beam 11.3 metres (37 ft 1 in) and a draught of 3.4 metres (11 ft 2 in). The coastal defence vessels are powered by four Jeumont ANR-53-50 alternators coupled to four Wärtsilä UD 23V12 diesel engines creating 7.2 megawatts (9,700 hp). Two LIPS Z-drive azimuth thrusters are driven by two Jeumont CI 560L motors creating 3,000 horsepower (2,200 kW) and the Z drives can be rotated 360°. This gives the ships a maximum speed of 15 knots (28 km/h; 17 mph) and a range of 5,000 nautical miles (9,300 km; 5,800 mi) at 8 knots (15 km/h; 9.2 mph).

The Kingston class is equipped with a Kelvin Hughes navigational radar using the I band and a Kelvin Hughes 6000 surface search radar scanning the E and F bands. The vessels carry an AN/SQS-511 towed side scan sonar for minesweeping and an AN/WLD-1 RMS Remote Minehunting System (RMHS). The vessels were equipped with one Bofors 40 mm/60 calibre Mk 5C gun and two M2 machine guns. (Note: The 60 calibre denotes the length of the gun. This means that the length of the gun barrel is 60 times the bore diameter.) The 40 mm gun was declared obsolete and removed from the vessels in 2014. Some of them ended up as museum pieces and on display at naval reserve installations across Canada. The Kingston-class coastal defence vessels have a complement of 37.

== Operational history ==
Summerside was laid down on 28 March 1998 by Halifax Shipyards Ltd. at Halifax, Nova Scotia and was launched on 25 September 1998. She was commissioned into the Canadian Forces on 18 July 1999 at Summerside, Prince Edward Island and carries the classification MM 711.

In August 2002, Summerside took part in Exercise "Narwhal Ranger", sailing into Arctic waters. This was the first time Canadian naval units had sailed into the Arctic in thirteen years.

As part of Exercise "Tradewinds" which took place from 1–25 June 2014, Summerside took part in and led training of forces from around the Caribbean Sea.

On 8 September 2015, Summerside deployed for large NATO naval exercises Joint Warrior and Trident Venture with Athabaskan, Windsor, Montréal, Halifax and Goose Bay.

In January 2016, Summerside, alongside sister ship Moncton, sailed for the Caribbean to take part in Operation Caribbe. On 7 March, off the coast of Nicaragua, a sailing vessel was intercepted in international waters. The vessel was boarded by US Coast Guard officials deploying from Summerside and 324 kg (714 lb) of cocaine was discovered and seized. The ship returned to Halifax on 7 April. In September Summerside was among the Canadian warships deployed to the NATO naval training exercise "Cutlass Fury" off the east coast of North America. In February 2017, Summerside and Moncton deployed to the coast of West Africa in the Gulf of Guinea as part of the naval exercise Neptune Trident. The two ships conducted missions against pirates and illegal fishing, along with making port visits to Sierra Leone, Senegal, Liberia and Ivory Coast. During the deployment, Summerside took part in a joint training exercise with naval vessels from Morocco and Senegal. Summerside returned to Halifax on 2 May with Moncton.

On 26 January 2018, Summerside and sister ship HMCS Kingston departed Halifax for West Africa to take part in the naval exercise Obangame Express 2018 with the United States Navy and several African navies. Their visit to Nigeria marked the first time Canadian warships have ever visited the country. The vessels returned to Halifax on 17 April. In October 2018, Summerside was among the Canadian ships deployed to the North Atlantic and Baltic Sea as part of the large NATO exercise, Trident Juncture. On 17 December 2018 Summerside and Glace Bay were sailing home to Halifax from their deployment in European waters when they were called to the aid of the sailing vessel Makena which had been disabled 440 kilometres (270 mi) southeast of Halifax. Summerside and Glace Bay rescued the four crewmembers of Makena with support from US and Canadian aircraft.

In June 2022, Summerside and Kingston were deployed to Europe in support of NATO following Russia's invasion of Ukraine. During their deployment, they detected naval mines leftover from World War II and safely detonated them. They returned to Halifax in November. In July 2023, Summerside and sister ship Shawinigan were deployed to the North Atlantic Ocean and Baltic Sea as part of Operation Reassurance for mine-clearing operations. They returned to Halifax in November.

In July 2025 it was announced that Summerside and seven of her sister ships would be decommissioned before the end of the year. The ship was decommissioned on 3 October 2025 at Halifax.
