= HMAS Moresby (1963) =

1963 survey ship of the Royal Australian Navy

History

Australia
- Namesake: John Moresby
- Builder: State Dockyard Newcastle
- Laid down: May 1962
- Launched: 7 September 1963
- Commissioned: 6 March 1964
- Decommissioned: 1998
- Renamed: MV Patricia Anne Hotung (1999)
- Identification: IMO number: 8952352
- Motto: "With Science and Vision"
- Honours and awards: Two inherited battle honours
- Fate: Sold September 1999 as humanitarian ship
- Badge

General characteristics
- Type: Survey ship
- Displacement: 2,340 tonnes
- Length: 95.7 m (314 ft)
- Beam: 12.8 m (42 ft)
- Draught: 3.81 m (12.5 ft) mean
- Propulsion: Diesel Electric, three English Electric diesel engines, 2 electric motors, 2 shafts
- Speed: 19 knots (35 km/h; 22 mph)
- Range: 10,000 nautical miles (19,000 km; 12,000 mi)
- Boats & landing craft carried: 3 × 34 ft (10 m) Survey Motor Boats
- Capacity: 372 tons oil fuel
- Complement: 146
- Sensors & processing systems: (Initial) TM 829 radar, Lambda and Hi Fix position fixing system, Simrad SU2 sonar, echo sounders, magnetometer Later (1980 onward) Argo DM54 and Miniranger position fixing systems, Atlas Deso echo sounders.
- Armament: 2 × 40 mm Bofors guns (removed 1973)
- Aircraft carried: Westland Scout (1964-1973); Bell 206B-1 Kiowa (1973)

HMAS Moresby, named for the explorer Captain John Moresby, was a hydrographic survey ship of the Royal Australian Navy (RAN). Serving in the RAN from 1964 to 1998, Moresby was then sold into civilian service. Renamed MV Patricia Anne Hotung, the ship was chartered by the International Organization for Migration.

== Construction ==
Moresby was launched at the State Dockyard, Newcastle on 7 September 1963 by the wife of Rear Admiral Gatacre. She was commissioned into the RAN on 6 March 1964. Moresby was the only ship of her class to be constructed.

== Operational history ==
Throughout her career in the RAN, Moresby sailed over 1 million miles, and carried out surveys of Torres Strait, the D'Entrecasteaux Channel in Tasmania, Exmouth Gulf, Wilsons Promontory and the Gulf of Papua.

== Decommissioning and civilian service ==
In October 1999, Moresby was sold to Hong Kong businessman and philanthropist Eric Hotung via Caravelle Investments Limited of Hong Kong for A$584,985. She was renamed MV Patricia Anne Hotung, and underwent a A$1 million refit at Maritime Engineers in Fremantle, Western Australia, enabling the 95-metre (312 ft) ship to carry 500 passengers and 2,021 tons of cargo.

Patricia Anne Hotung sailed in support of the International Organization for Migration (IOM), and transported approximately 10,000 refugees from the West Timor camps to East Timor between January 2000 and 24 July 2001. IOM Director General Brunson McKinley described the ship's role as "invaluable" and "a remarkable contribution to the international humanitarian effort to bring East Timorese refugees home to begin rebuilding their devastated country"
