= HMAS Moresby =

Two ships of the Royal Australian Navy have been named HMAS Moresby, for Captain (later Admiral) John Moresby:

- HMAS Moresby (1918), a 24-class sloop serving with the Royal Navy from 1918 to 1925 as HMS Silvio, and with the RAN from 1925 to 1946
- HMAS Moresby (1963), a unique survey vessel serving from 1963 until 1998, before entering civilian service

== Battle honours ==
Ships named HMAS Moresby are entitled to carry two battle honours:

- Pacific 1942–43
- New Guinea 1943–44

== See also ==
- HMS Moresby, a Royal Navy destroyer serving in World War I
- HMCS Moresby (MSA 112), a Canadian Forces minesweeper operating from 1989 to 2000
