= Maritime Coastal Defence Vessel Project =

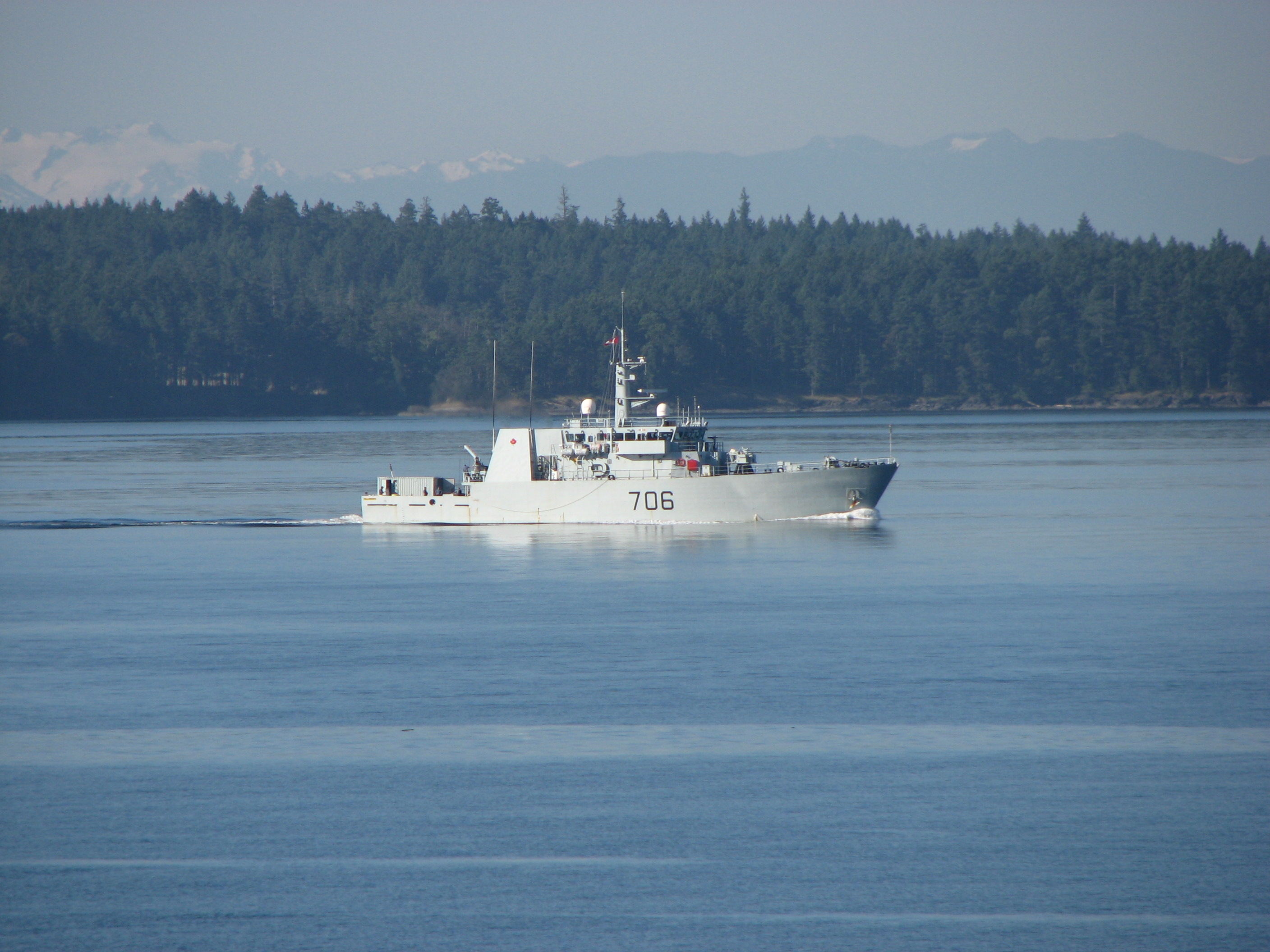
HMCS Yellowknife, a Kingston-class coastal defence vessel

The Maritime Coastal Defence Vessel Project (MCDVP) was a procurement project undertaken by the Canadian Department of National Defence beginning in the mid-1980s to find a replacement to fill the minesweeper, coastal patrol and reserve training needs of the Canadian Forces, replacing the Anticosti and Bay-class minesweepers, Porte-class gate vessels and Royal Canadian Mounted Police coastal launches in those roles. After construction these vessels became known as the Royal Canadian Navy's Kingston-class maritime coastal defence vessels (MCDVs).

== Project history ==
Born from a need that dated back to the 1970s, the MCDV project was established to restore minesweeping capabilities to the Canadian Navy along with providing at-sea training vessels for reservists. The decision to begin the program began in the 1987 National Defence White Paper under the concept of "Total Force". This was intended to mask reductions in the regular force by increasing the capabilities of the reserve forces. This led the navy to add minesweeping and coastal patrol duties to the reserve force's list of duties.

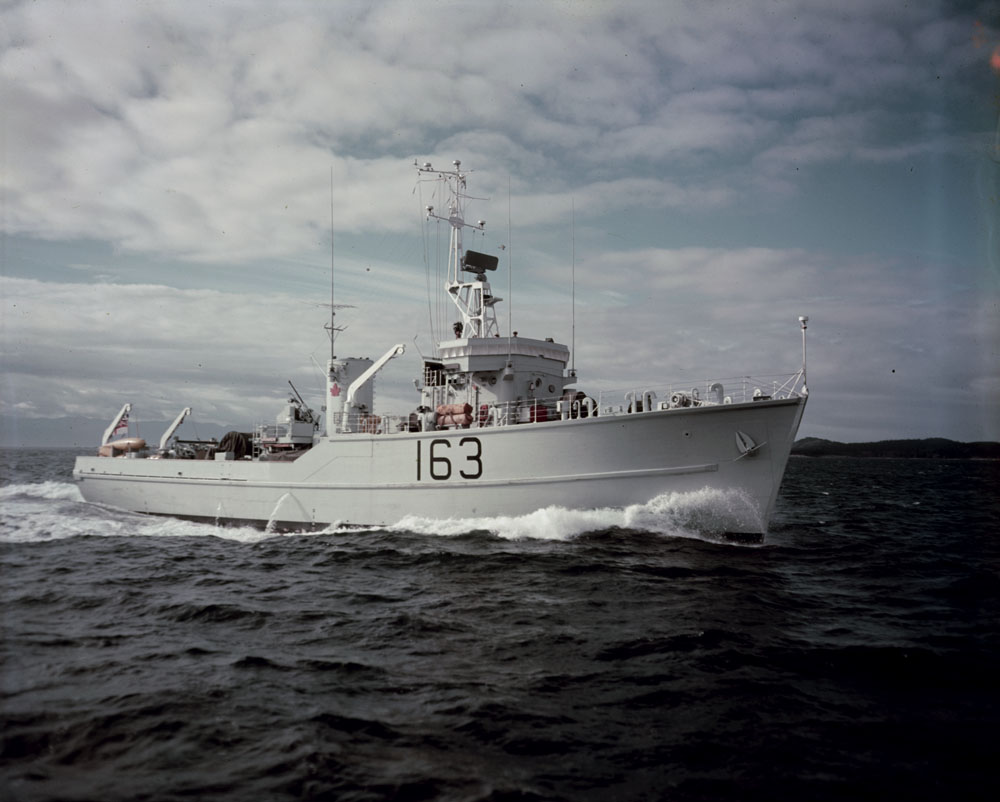
HMCS Miramichi, one of the Bay-class minesweepers Canada was intending to replace

There were five main criteria for the design. The ships had to be built in Canada, they had to be inexpensive to build, they had to be operable by naval reservists, the design had to have role flexibility included, and they had to be inexpensive to operate. This was exemplified by the Royal Navy's River-class minesweeper which was operated by the Royal Navy Reserve. The ships were to replace the Anticosti and Bay-class minesweepers, Porte-class gate vessels and Royal Canadian Mounted Police coastal launches in those roles.

The federal government's procurement agency, the Department of Public Works, placed a Request for Proposal in September 1988 to Canadian shipbuilders for construction of twelve MCDVs. Six proposals were submitted, one from Finco Engineers, one from Halifax Dartmouth Industries (HDIL), one from Saint John Shipbuilding, one from Allied Shipbuilders, one from Canadian Shipbuilding & Engineering, and one from MIL-Davie. The federal government awarded the $750 million contract in 1992 for the design and construction of the twelve new MCDVs to Finco Engineers, a subsidiary of Lavalin.

== Design ==
Roughly the size of Second World War corvettes, the MCDVs were built to mercantile standards to save money. These vessels were to be designed for crewing by a combined crew of approximately 37 Canadian Forces naval reservists and regular force members and were to have the capability to quickly change out "modularized mission packages" ranging from minesweeping to route survey to coastal patrol (anti-smuggling/immigration law enforcement operations) to fisheries patrol duties. In order to perform their varied duties the Kingston-class vessels are designed to carry up to three 6.1-metre (20 ft) ISO containers with power hookups on the open deck aft in order to embark mission-specific payloads. The seven module types available for embarkation include four route survey, two mechanical minesweeping and one bottom inspection modules.

The Kingston class displace 970 long tons (990 t) and are 55.3 metres (181 ft 5 in) long overall with a beam 11.3 metres (37 ft 1 in) and a draught of 3.4 metres (11 ft 2 in). The coastal defence vessels are powered by four Jeumont ANR-53-50 alternators coupled to four Wärtsilä UD 23V12 diesel engines creating 7.2 megawatts (9,700 hp). Two LIPS Z-drive azimuth thrusters are driven by two Jeumont CI 560L motors creating 3,000 horsepower (2,200 kW) and the Z drives can be rotated 360°. This gives the ships a maximum speed of 15 knots (28 km/h; 17 mph) and a range of 5,000 nautical miles (9,300 km; 5,800 mi) at 8 knots (15 km/h; 9.2 mph).

The Kingston class is equipped with a Kelvin Hughes navigational radar using the I band and a Kelvin Hughes 6000 surface search radar scanning the E and F bands. The vessels carry an AN/SQS-511 towed side scan sonar for minesweeping and a Remote-control Mine Hunting System (RMHS). The vessels are equipped with one Bofors 40 mm/60 calibre Mk 5C gun and two M2 machine guns. (Note: The 60 calibre denotes the length of the gun. This means that the length of the gun barrel is 60 times the bore diameter.)

== Construction and design issues ==
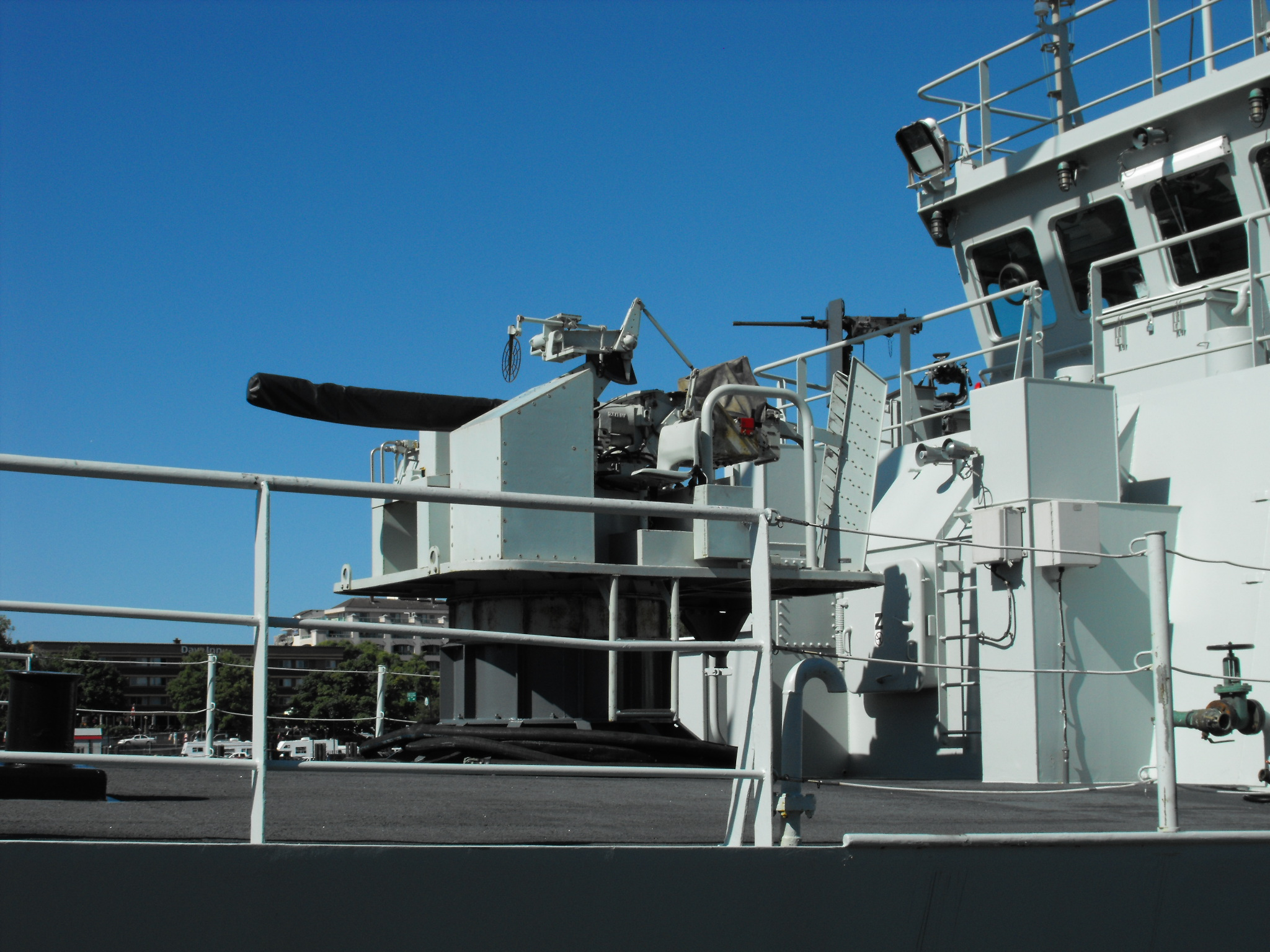
A Bofors 40 mm/60 calibre Mk 5C gun aboard HMCS Nanaimo

SNC-Lavalin was instructed by the Department of Public Works to use "Commercial‐off‐the‐Shelf equipment" which drove costs higher. One area of reported controversy was the decision by the government to only arm the ships with .50 calibre machine guns. Subsequent design modifications resulted in a single Bofors 40 mm/60 calibre Mk 5C gun being added to the bow of each ship.

Another area of controversy apparently resulted with the means by which the ships were to be ballasted in order to adjust the trim of the ships. The shipyard proposed to use concrete, which was countered by government procurement officers and SNC-Lavalin engineers who proposed to use water. Water was susceptible to being pumped out, rendering the vessels unstable. Lead was proposed but rejected by the government so in the end steel was used for ballast. The end result of the design was that it was not adequate for the sea states that the vessels worked in and were not popular postings.

The vessels were all constructed by Halifax Shipyards and entered service between 1996 and 1999. All of the class were named after Canadian cities. The majority of the ships in the class perpetuated names of Second World War corvettes.

== See also ==
- Canadian Patrol Frigate Project, another Canadian procurement project of the same era
