= HMCS Kingston =

Royal Canadian Navy coastal defence vessel

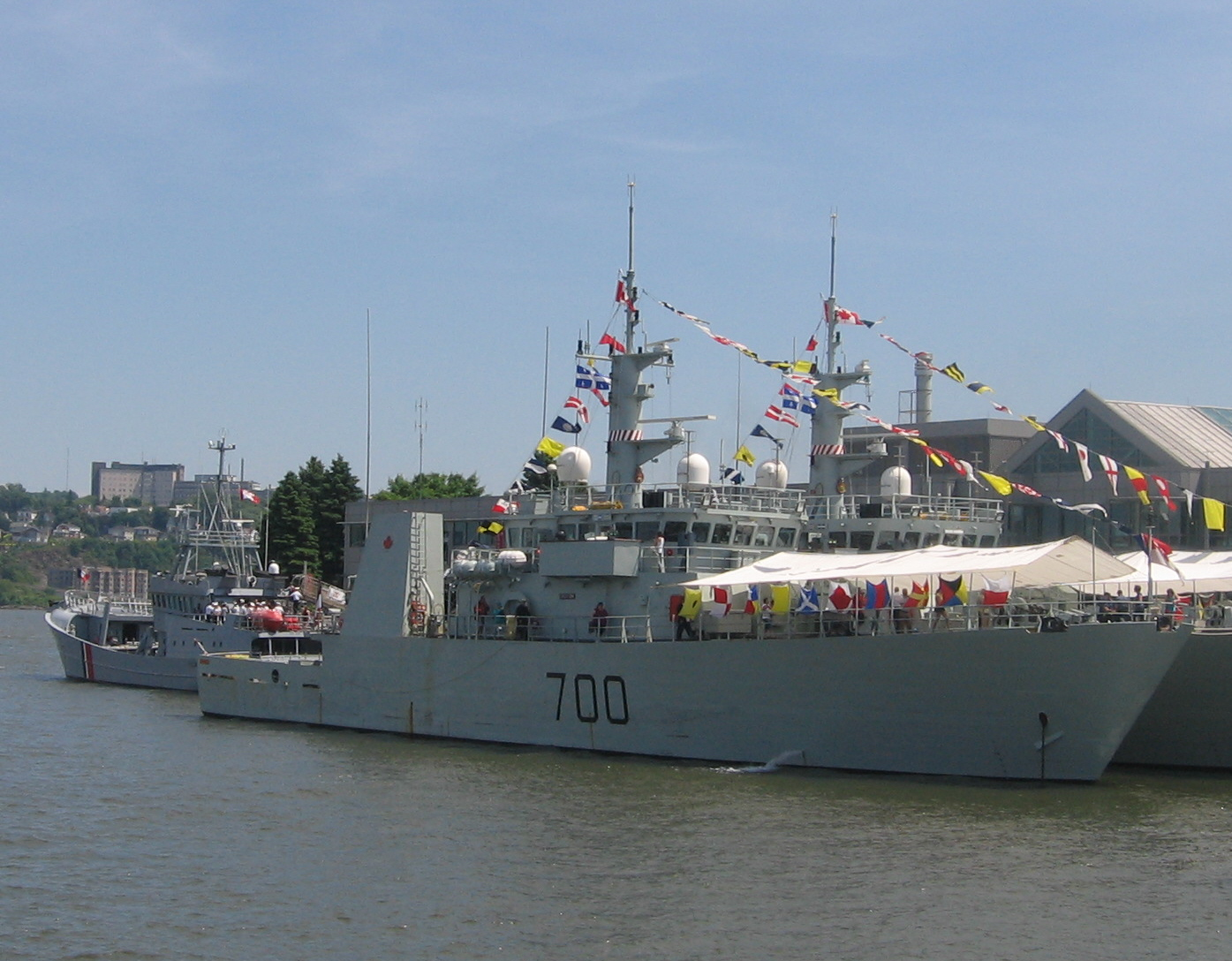
- HMCS Kingston alongside in 2010

History

Canada
- Name: Kingston
- Namesake: Kingston, Ontario
- Builder: Halifax Shipyards Ltd., Halifax, Nova Scotia
- Laid down: 12 December 1994
- Launched: 12 August 1995
- Commissioned: 21 September 1996
- Decommissioned: 3 October 2025
- Home port: CFB Halifax
- Identification: Pennant number: MM 700; MMSI number: 316139000
- Motto: Pro Rege et Grege (For sovereign and people)
- Status: Decommissioned
- Notes: Colours: Gold and Red

General characteristics
- Class & type: Kingston-class coastal defence vessel
- Displacement: 970 long tons (986 t)
- Length: 55.3 m (181 ft 5 in)
- Beam: 11.3 m (37 ft 1 in)
- Draught: 3.4 m (11 ft 2 in)
- Propulsion: 4 × Jeumont ANR-53-50 alternators, 4 × 600VAC Wärtsilä UD 23V12 diesel engines, 7.2 MW (9,700 hp); 2 × Jeumont CI 560L motors, 3,000 hp (2,200 kW); 2 × LIPS Z drive azimuth thrusters
- Speed: 15 knots (28 km/h; 17 mph)
- Range: 5,000 nmi (9,300 km; 5,800 mi) at 8 kn (15 km/h; 9.2 mph)
- Complement: 37
- Sensors & processing systems: Kelvin Hughes navigation radar (I-band); Kelvin Hughes 6000 surface search radar (E-F band); Global Positioning System; AN/SQS-511 towed side scan sonar; Remote-control Mine Hunting System (RMHS)
- Armament: 1 × Bofors 40 mm/60 Mk 5C gun (later removed); 2 × M2 machine guns

HMCS Kingston is a decommissioned Kingston-class coastal defence vessel that served in the Canadian Forces from 1996 to 2025. Kingston is the lead ship of her class, ordered under the Maritime Coastal Defence Vessel Project. She was the first vessel to use the designation HMCS Kingston. She was assigned to Maritime Forces Atlantic (MARLANT) and homeported at CFB Halifax.

== Design and description ==
The Kingston class was designed to fill the minesweeper, coastal patrol and reserve training needs of the Canadian Forces, replacing the Bay-class minesweepers, Porte-class gate vessels and Royal Canadian Mounted Police coastal launches in those roles. In order to perform these varied duties the Kingston-class vessels are designed to carry up to three 6.1-metre (20 ft) ISO containers with power hookups on the open deck aft in order to embark mission-specific payloads. The seven module types available for embarkation include four route survey, two mechanical minesweeping and one bottom inspection modules.

The Kingston class displace 970 long tons (986 t) and are 55.3 metres (181 ft 5 in) long overall with a beam 11.3 metres (37 ft 1 in) and a draught of 3.4 metres (11 ft 2 in). The coastal defence vessels are powered by four Jeumont ANR-53-50 alternators coupled to four Wärtsilä UD 23V12 diesel engines creating 7.2 megawatts (9,700 hp). Two LIPS Z-drive azimuth thrusters are driven by two Jeumont CI 560L motors creating 3,000 horsepower (2,200 kW) and the Z drives can be rotated 360°. This gives the ships a maximum speed of 15 knots (28 km/h; 17 mph) and a range of 5,000 nautical miles (9,300 km; 5,800 mi) at 8 knots (15 km/h; 9.2 mph).

The Kingston class is equipped with a Kelvin Hughes navigational radar using the I band and a Kelvin Hughes 6000 surface search radar scanning the E and F bands. The vessels carry an AN/SQS-511 towed side scan sonar for minesweeping and a Remote-control Mine Hunting System (RMHS). The vessels are equipped with one Bofors 40 mm/60 calibre Mk 5C gun and two M2 machine guns. (Note: The 60 calibre denotes the length of the gun. This means that the length of the gun barrel is 60 times the bore diameter.) The 40 mm gun was declared obsolete and removed from the vessels in 2014. Some of them ended up as museum pieces and on display at naval reserve installations across Canada. The Kingston-class coastal defence vessels have a complement of 37.

== Service history ==
Kingston was laid down on 12 December 1994 at Halifax Shipyards Ltd., Halifax, Nova Scotia and was launched on 12 August 1995. The first ship to be constructed at Halifax in 32 years, Kingston was commissioned into the Canadian Forces at Kingston, Ontario on 21 September 1996 and carries the hull classification number MM 700.

In September 1998, Kingston was among the Canadian Forces vessels deployed to Peggy's Cove, Nova Scotia in response to the crash of Swissair Flight 111, conducting recovery operations. In March 1999, the coastal defence vessel sailed to the Baltic Sea to participate in the NATO naval exercise "Blue Game" with sister ship Glace Bay and Anticosti.

In 2011, Kingston was among the Royal Canadian Navy vessels deployed to the Caribbean Sea as part of Operation Caribbe, Canada's contribution to Operation Martillo, the multinational effort to eliminate illegal drug trafficking in the Caribbean Sea and the eastern Pacific Ocean. In total, 201 metric tons were interdicted that year, in which Kingston played a part. In 2012, Kingston was assigned again to Operation Caribe. That year, Operation Martillo seized 152 tons of cocaine and several million dollars in cash.

In June 2013, Kingston and Glace Bay were sent on a seven-week tour of the Saint Lawrence Seaway and the Great Lakes, making several port calls along the way. In 2014, she returned to serve in Operation Caribbe. In the summer of 2014, Kingston, joined by the Canadian Coast Guard vessel CCGS Sir Wilfrid Laurier and two private ships searched for and found one of the ships that disappeared during Franklin's lost expedition.

In the summer of 2016, Kingston was sent on a goodwill tour of the Great Lakes, making several port visits. On 7 October, Kingston left Halifax to participate in Operation Caribbe in the Caribbean Sea, returning on 9 December 2016. In August 2017, the Halifax-class frigate HMCS Montréal and Kingston and sister ship Moncton departed Halifax to take part in the Operation Nanook in Canada's northern waters.

On 26 January 2018, Kingston and sister ship Summerside departed Halifax for West Africa to take part in the naval exercise Obangame Express 2018 with the United States Navy and several African navies. Their visit to Nigeria marked the first time Canadian warships have ever visited the country. The vessels returned to Halifax on 17 April. In August, Kingston and Charlottetown departed Halifax to take part in Operation Nanook, travelling to Iqaluit, Nunavut and Nuuk, Greenland. On 22 January 2019, Kingston and sister ship Shawinigan departed Halifax for operations off West Africa as part of Operation Projection, working with African nations as well as the United States, United Kingdom and France. The vessels returned to Halifax on 26 April.

In June 2022, Kingston and Summerside were deployed to Europe in support of NATO following Russia's invasion of Ukraine. During their deployment, they detected naval mines leftover from World War II and safely detonated them. They returned to Halifax in November.

In July 2025 it was announced that HMCS Kingston and seven of her sister ships would be decommissioned before the end of the year. The ship was decommissioned on 3 October 2025 at Halifax.
