= HMCS Moresby =

History
- Name: Lady Joyce
- Builder: Allied Shipbuilders Ltd., Vancouver
- Yard number: 180
- Launched: 11 November 1972
- Completed: 24 April 1973
- In service: 1973
- Out of service: 1988
- Renamed: Joyce Tide (1974)
- Fate: Sold to Canadian Forces in 1988

Canada
- Name: Moresby
- Namesake: Moresby Island
- Acquired: March 1998
- Commissioned: 7 May 1989
- Decommissioned: 10 March 2000
- Home port: CFB Halifax
- Identification: MSA 112
- Fate: sold 2002 for commercial use
- Renamed: Echo Star (2002); Malbun (2002); Echo Star (2002); Silver Star (2004); Echo Star (2005); Silver Star (2005); Ramco I (2007); Ramco Express (2007)
- In service: 2002
- Identification: IMO number: 7301245
- Status: Ship in active service

General characteristics
- Class & type: Anticosti-class minesweeper
- Displacement: 1,093 t (1,076 long tons); 2,200 t (2,200 long tons) deep load
- Length: 58.3 m (191 ft 3 in)
- Beam: 13.1 m (43 ft 0 in)
- Draught: 5.2 m (17 ft 1 in)
- Propulsion: 4 × NOHAB Polar diesel engines (4,200 bhp (3,100 kW)), 2 shafts, Kort nozzles; 1 × 550 bhp (410 kW) azimuth bow thruster
- Speed: 13.5 knots (25.0 km/h; 15.5 mph)
- Endurance: 12,000 nmi (22,000 km; 14,000 mi)
- Complement: 23

HMCS Moresby was an Anticosti-class minesweeper that served in the Canadian Forces from 1989 to 2000. She was named for Moresby Island, which in turn is named for Fairfax Moresby, former Commander-in-Chief of Pacific Station at Esquimalt Royal Navy Dockyard. Prior to her acquisition by Canada, Moresby served as the offshore supply vessel Joyce Tide, built by Allied Shipbuilders of Vancouver, British Columbia. Joyce Tide was acquired by the Canadian Forces for conversion to a minesweeper and as a training ship for naval reservists. With the entry into service of the Kingston-class coastal defence vessels, Moresby was sold to commercial interests, returning to her previous career. The ship was renamed several times, most recently Ramco Express in 2007.

== Design ==
The ship was initially constructed for use as an offshore drill-rig supply vessel by International Offshore Services. As a supply vessel, Jean Tide was 1,093 tonnes (1,076 long tons) with a deadweight tonnage of 1,196 tons. The ship was 58.3 metres (191 ft 3 in) long overall and 51.7 metres (169 ft 7 in) between perpendiculars with a beam of 13.1 metres (43 ft 0 in) and a draught of 5.2 metres (17 ft 1 in). The Anticosti class was powered by four NOHAB Polar SF 16RS diesel engines driving two shafts creating 4,600 horsepower (3,400 kW) and one 575 brake horsepower (429 kW) Gil Jet azimuth bow thruster. This created a maximum speed of 13.5 knots (25.0 km/h; 15.5 mph) and an endurance of 12,000 nautical miles (22,000 km; 14,000 mi) at 13 knots (24 km/h; 15 mph). The vessels were rated as ice class 3 and suitable for employment in light ice.

The vessel was purchased in 1988 by Maritime Command (MARCOM) of the Canadian Forces and converted into a minesweeping auxiliary. In military use the vessels had a complement of 5 officers and 18 ratings. The two ships of the class were equipped two Racal Decca navigation radars operating on the I band. For minesweeping purposes, they were provided with mechanical minesweeping equipment and a high frequency, towed side scan variable depth sonar.

== Service history ==
The ship was laid down as Lady Joyce by Allied Shipbuilders Ltd. of Vancouver with the yard number 180 and launched on 11 November 1972. The ship was completed on 24 April 1973 and was renamed Joyce Tide in 1974.

As part of the plan for the Naval Reserve to take over minesweeping and coastal operations, MARCOM began its effort to provide ships for training. MARCOM acquired two ships, one being Joyce Tide in March 1988. The ship was converted at Marystown, Newfoundland to an minesweeping auxiliary and commissioned with the classification MSA 112. The mechanical sweeps, sonar and navigation systems were added in April 1990. In March 1997, the ship transferred to CFB Esquimalt. After the Kingston class was commissioned, Moresby was identified as surplus and paid off on 10 March 2000 and turned over for disposal.

Sold in 2000 for commercial use, her name was changed to Echo Star 2000 to 2002. In 2002 the vessel became Malbun, and later that year, her name was changed back to Echo Star. This name lasted until 2004 when her named was changed again to Silver Star. In 2005 the vessel's name was changed back to Echo Star, then back again to Silver Star, a name she kept until 2007. In 2007, the vessel was renamed Ramco 1 and then again to Ramco Express.

Moresby is now a commercial tug in Panama.
