= Allied Shipbuilders =

Shipbuilding and ship repairing company

Allied Shipbuilders Ltd is a privately held shipbuilding and ship repairing company established in Canada in 1948.

== Company profile ==

Founded in 1948 by Arthur McLaren (1919-1999), Allied Shipbuilders is one of the older continually operating commercial shipyards on the Pacific Coast of North America. Located at the mouth of the Seymour River in North Vancouver, the company provides shipbuilding, ship repair, and engineering services to ferries, fish boats, tugs and barges that operate on the Pacific Coast. It was fully owned by the McLaren family from 1948 to 2012. Majority ownership was purchased on February 1, 2012 by Chuck Ko, who was, until then, the company's vice-president of operations. Mr. Ko is now president.

Other organizations sharing Allied's property are Western Machine Works (providing hydraulic tow pin units for tug boats), and Coast Engineering Works, which builds and services marine propulsion shafts and rudders. Located on site, but not owned by Allied, is Osborne Propellers.

== History ==
Allied Shipbuilders grew from the demise of a predecessor company, West Coast Shipbuilders Ltd. The demand for wartime cargo-ship orders provided the incentive for a group of Vancouver businessmen to set up a four-berth shipyard in False Creek, Vancouver, British Columbia, on a site where the J. Coughlan & Sons shipyard had operated during the First World War and where the Athlete's Village for the 2010 Winter Olympics was built between 2006 and 2010. W. D. McLaren was hired as general manager. His son, Arthur, joined West Coast after completing his engineering degree at the University of British Columbia. West Coast Shipbuilders was set up in 1941 and launched the first ship, the Fort Chilcotin, in March 1942. By war's end, West Coast Shipbuilders had launched 55 Fort and Park ships—the Canadian equivalent to the Liberty Ship. After the war, West Coast built a number of fuel barges for Northern Transportation Co. Ltd. for service on the MacKenzie River to the Arctic and the M.V. Anscomb ferry for service on Kootenay Lake before closing in 1948. By that time, Arthur McLaren had become shipyard manager.

Arthur McLaren then set up his own small shipbuilding company, which he named Allied Builders Ltd., on a small, leased portion of the yard of the former West Coast Shipbuilders in November 1948. Allied Builders initially focused on constructing small steel tugs at a time in the region when most were built of wood. In 1961, the company changed its name to Allied Shipbuilders and expanded into ship repairs by acquiring Burrard Shipyard & Marine Ways, which operated a ship repair yard in Coal Harbour. In 1967, Allied left False Creek, establishing a larger shipyard just east of the Ironworkers Memorial Second Narrows Crossing, where it continues to operate to this day. The company's Coal Harbour yard was closed in 1979 to make way for a series of waterfront high-rise towers that were subsequently built on the land, and its operations joined those of Allied on the north shore of Vancouver Harbour.

Now primarily a repair yard, Allied has constructed 259 hulls during its history, including fish boats, tugs, log barges, ferries, off-shore supply vessels, Arctic icebreakers and harbour-patrol ships. The company operates two floating drydocks, which were designed and constructed in its own yards. As of 2012, it has become British Columbia's second-largest privately owned, commercial shipyard company, employing 120 people.

On February 1, 2012 and after 63 years of family ownership, brothers Jim and Malcolm McLaren, the firm's shipyard manager and president, respectively, sold their majority ownership in Allied Shipbuilders to Chuck Ko, who had been, until then, the company's vice-president of operations. Ko, a professional engineer (P.Eng.), subsequently became president of the company, after 30 years as an employee of the firm. The transaction occurred after the trio completed several years of transition preparation to ensure the stability of the firm. The two McLaren's signed the sale documents as one of their last acts before stepping away, each for different reasons. Jim retired, while Malcolm left his position for health reasons. There are still McLarens at Allied, however. A third brother, Douglas McLaren, continued as both a part owner and as the company's Electrical Superintendent. His sons, Jason and Marcus, as well as Jim McLaren's son, Ward, remained with the company as well.

Ko was hired by the firm's founder, Arthur McLaren (P.Eng), in 1980. A Registered Professional Engineer in Naval Architecture and Marine Engineering and a Member of the Society of Naval Architects and Marine Engineers, Ko progressed through the company, starting as a design draftsman, but later holding positions such as technical manager and later vice-president of operations. In the four years prior to his purchase of the firm, he managed projects valued in excess of $50 million on behalf of Allied Shipbuilders.

== Ferries ==
- Hull 72 North Island Princess - 1958
- Hull 108 Quadra Queen - 1960, now the MV Spirit of Lax Kw'alaams
- Hull 117 Garibaldi - 1961, now the MV RJ Breadner.
- Hull 164 Tacheck - 1969
- Hull 165 Quadra Queen II - 1969

Between 1949 and 1992, Allied delivered 252 vessels. Since 1993, it has constructed seven. Internally these are numbered hulls 253-259.

- Hull 253, designed by Robert Allan Ltd., is a 2,400-horsepower, z-peller berthing tug for C.H. Cates & Sons, which is now part of Seaspan Marine.
- Hulls 255 and 254 are the forward-hull sections of the two Spirit Class ferries, the Spirit of British Columbia and the Spirit of Vancouver Island. The ships are also part of the BC Ferries's fleet. Both sections measure 59.1 by 26.8 by 7.9 m (194 by 88 by 26 ft).
- Hull 256 is an aluminum catamaran patrol vessel purpose-built for the Royal Canadian Mounted Police (RCMP), the Inkster. The Inkster allows the RCMP to service communities on the BC North Coast.
- Hull 257 was designed in-house and is the Skeena Queen, a 110-metre (360-foot) Century class ferry capable of carrying 100 vehicles, and is part of the BC Ferries fleet.
- Hull 258 is a harbour-patrol vessel, the Takaya, built for the Vancouver Port Authority. It joined its sister ship the Kla-Wichen (hull 245) also built by Allied.
- Hull number 259, a former Utah State Ferry, the MV John Atlantic Burr, was redesigned for BC Ferries. The capacity of the ship was lengthened and widened with an addition to the middle of the hull. A new superstructure was fitted, along with new machinery, piping and equipment. It was rechristened as the MV ''Kuper''. The launching, the first at Allied since 1997, took place on November 3, 2006.
- HMCS Anticosti (MSA 110) and HMCS Moresby (MSA 112) - 1973

== Ships of steel ==
Allied's founder, Thomas Arthur (T.A.) McLaren, a Professional Engineer and Fellow of the Society of Naval Architects and Marine Engineers, worked with Vancouver author Vickie Jensen and his son, Malcolm McLaren, to publish the book Ships of Steel, a British Columbia Shipbuilder's Story. The book provides an overview of steel shipbuilding in British Columbia from the view of a typical shipbuilding firm, and includes personal recollections contributed by T.A. from his years in the shipbuilding industry. The book was published after T.A.'s death in 1999.
