= Kingston-class coastal defence vessel =

Class of coastal defence vessels operated by the Royal Canadian Navy

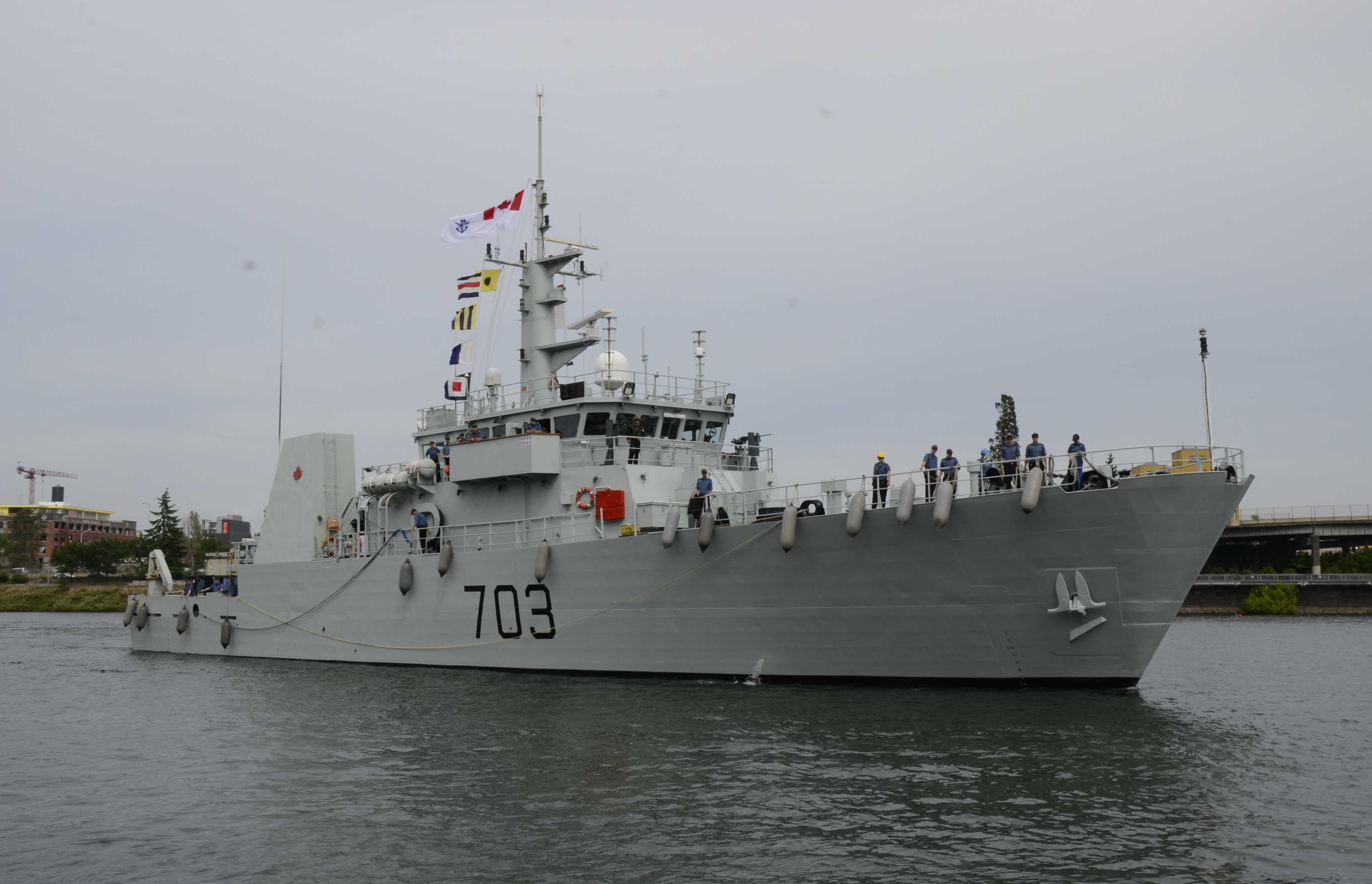
- HMCS Edmonton in June 2017

Class overview
- Name: Kingston class
- Builders: Halifax Shipyards Ltd., Halifax, Nova Scotia
- Operators: Royal Canadian Navy
- Preceded by: Anticosti class
- Built: 1994–1998
- In commission: 21 September 1996–present
- Completed: 12
- Active: 4
- Retired: 8

General characteristics
- Type: Coastal defence vessel
- Displacement: 970 t (950 long tons)
- Length: 55.31 m (181 ft 6 in) oa; 49 m (160 ft 9 in) pp
- Beam: 11.3 m (37 ft 1 in)
- Draught: 3.42 m (11 ft 3 in)
- Propulsion: 2 × Jeumont DC electric motors; 4 × 600 VAC Wärtsilä UD 23V12 diesel engines; 2 × Z drive azimuth thrusters
- Speed: 15 knots (28 km/h; 17 mph)
- Range: 5,000 nmi (9,300 km; 5,800 mi)
- Complement: 47 max
- Sensors & processing systems: Kelvin Hughes Nucleus S-band surface search radar; Towed high-frequency sidescan sonar; Remote-control Mine Hunting System (RMHS); Magnetic degaussing system
- Armament: 1 × Bofors 40 mm L/60 Mk 5C cannon (removed 2014); 1 x Nanuk RCWS 12.7 mm heavy machine gun (trial); 2 × M2 machine guns
- Aircraft carried: AeroVironment RQ-20 Puma UAS

The Kingston class consists of 12 coastal defence vessels operated by the Royal Canadian Navy. The class is the name for the Maritime Coastal Defence Vessel Project (MCDV). These multi-role vessels were built and launched from the mid- to late-1990s and are crewed by a combination of Naval Reserve and Regular Force personnel. The main missions of the vessels are reservist training, coastal patrol, minesweeping, law enforcement, pollution surveillance and search and rescue. The multi-purpose nature of the vessels led to their mixed construction between commercial and naval standards. The Kingston class is split between the east and west coasts of Canada and regularly deploy overseas to West Africa, Europe, Central America and the Caribbean.

In July 2025, the Royal Canadian Navy announced that the Kingston class will begin to be paid off and retired starting in late 2025. They will be replaced by 16–20 corvettes, as part of the Continental Defence Corvette program.

== Background ==
The Kingston class was the result of the Maritime Coastal Defence Vessel Project (MCDV) in the late 1980s. The project came about due to four influences, along with restrictions. The vessels in use by the Canadian Forces Naval Reserve were ageing and needed replacement. At the time, the Maritime Command was using old Mackenzie-class destroyers, Bay-class minesweepers and Porte-class gate vessels to train reservists, with the vast majority of the ships having begun service in the 1950s and early 1960s. The navy lacked a mine warfare capability. Furthermore, the new Halifax-class frigates were not capable of inshore and restricted area patrol and finally, the government sought to keep the shipbuilding efforts ongoing, as the frigate program was already well underway.

The MCDV project was also the culmination of a series of political promises offered by then Minister of National Defence Gilles Lamontagne. The government sought to move the National Reserve Headquarters from Halifax, Nova Scotia, to Quebec City, Quebec, as part of their effort to increase French representation in the armed forces. The move was to provide a site where French-Canadians could live and work in their native language. Lamontagne faced opposition within the Forces due to Quebec City being far from the existing naval bases and the waters around it freezing during winter months. Lamontagne promised to replace the ships for naval reserve training in order to move the project forward. The program began in the 1987 National Defence White Paper under the concept of "Total Force". This was intended to mask reductions in the regular force by increasing the capabilities of the reserve forces. This led the navy to add minesweeping and coastal patrol duties to the reserve force's list of duties.

== Design and description ==
There were five main criteria for the design. The ships had to be built in Canada, they had to be inexpensive to build, they had to be operable by naval reservists, the design had to have role flexibility included, and they had to be inexpensive to operate. This was exemplified by the Royal Navy's River-class minesweeper which was operated by the Royal Navy Reserve. The design originally called for steel-hulled mine countermeasures vessels and training ships. The Kingston class was built to naval standards in stability and maneuverability, and in the magazines; but otherwise only to commercial standards, to reduce costs. The ships' mixed construction is visible in their two square, separated funnels, which were cheaper to manufacture, and their poor seakeeping and large radar signature. The vessels were re-designated MCDV from MM (General Mine Warfare Vessel) when two follow-on programmes of purely minesweeper/hunters were cancelled, denoting their mixed duties.

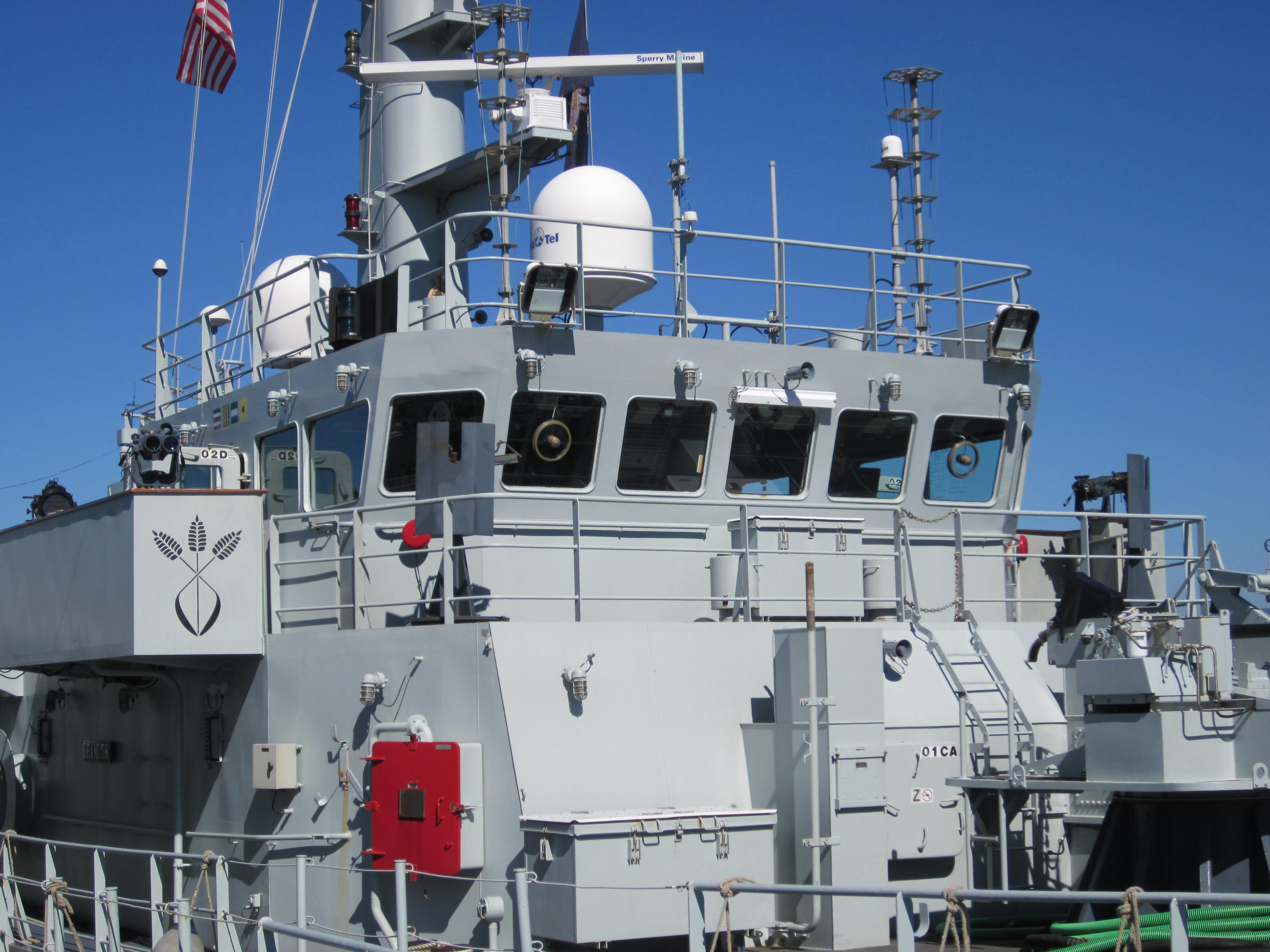
HMCS Brandon's bridge, with the ship's sensors and radar placed on top of it

The ships have a standard displacement of 772 tonnes (760 long tons) light and 979 t (964 long tons) fully loaded. During sea trials, the vessels were found to be top heavy and a further 9 t (8.9 long tons) of permanent ballast was added. The Kingston class measure 55.31 metres (181 ft 6 in) long overall and 49 m (160 ft 9 in) between perpendiculars with a beam of 11.3 m (37 ft 1 in) and a draught of 3.42 m (11 ft 3 in). The vessels have a maximum crew of 47, with crew sizes changing depending on the vessel's task. The crew is a mix of reservists and regular force personnel, with the regular force personnel assigned to engine room and electronics tasks. The Kingston class are equipped with Kelvin Hughes Nucleus S-band surface search radar.

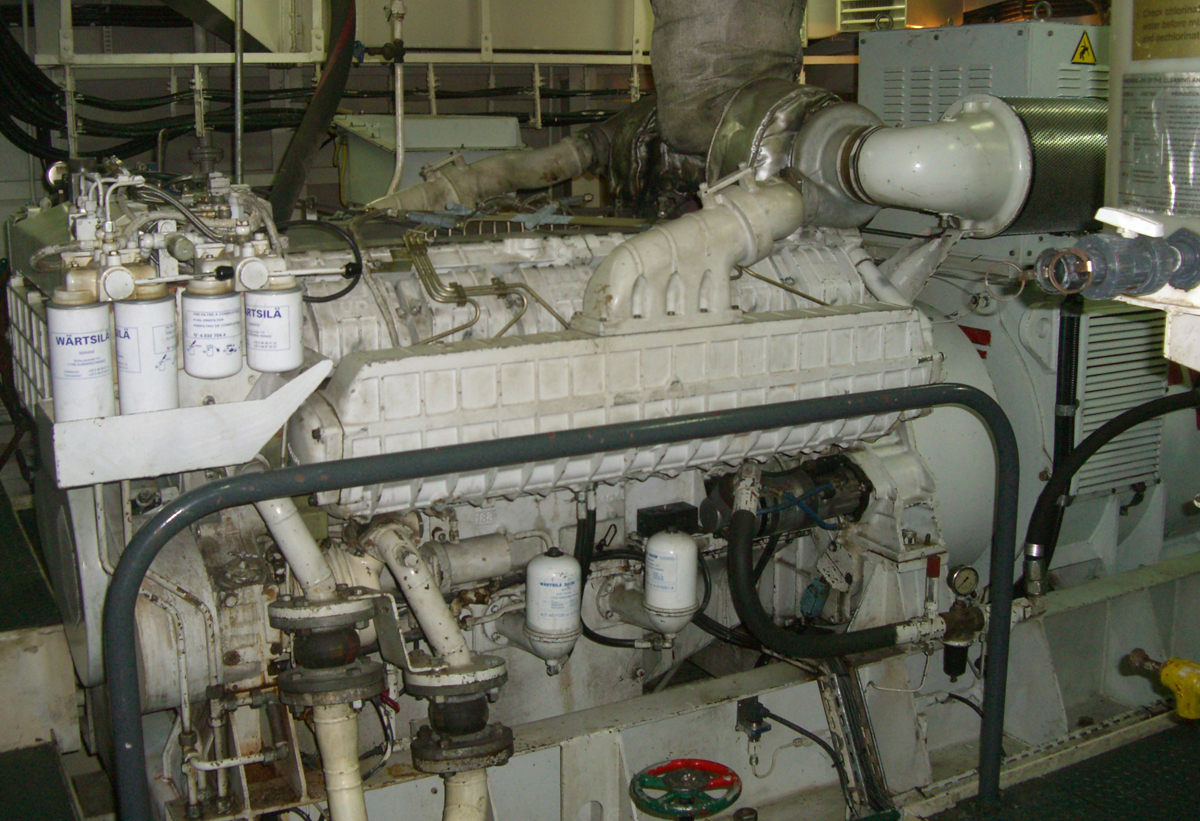
Wärtsilä diesel engine aboard HMCS Yellowknife c. 2008

The Kingston class use an electric drive system that is powered by four Wärtsilä UD 23V12 diesel engines which are coupled to four Jeumont ANR 53-50-4 alternators, creating 715 kilowatts each. Two Jeumont C1 560 L electric motors provide power to the two LIPS FS-100 Z-drive azimuth thrusters which are fitted with fixed-pitch reversing propellers. In total the system creates 3,064 shaft horsepower (2,285 kW) and a maximum speed of 15 knots (28 km/h; 17 mph). When minesweeping, the vessels have a maximum speed of 10 knots (19 km/h; 12 mph). The Kingston class have a range of 5,000 nautical miles (9,300 km; 5,800 mi) at 8 knots (15 km/h; 9.2 mph) and have an endurance of 18 days.

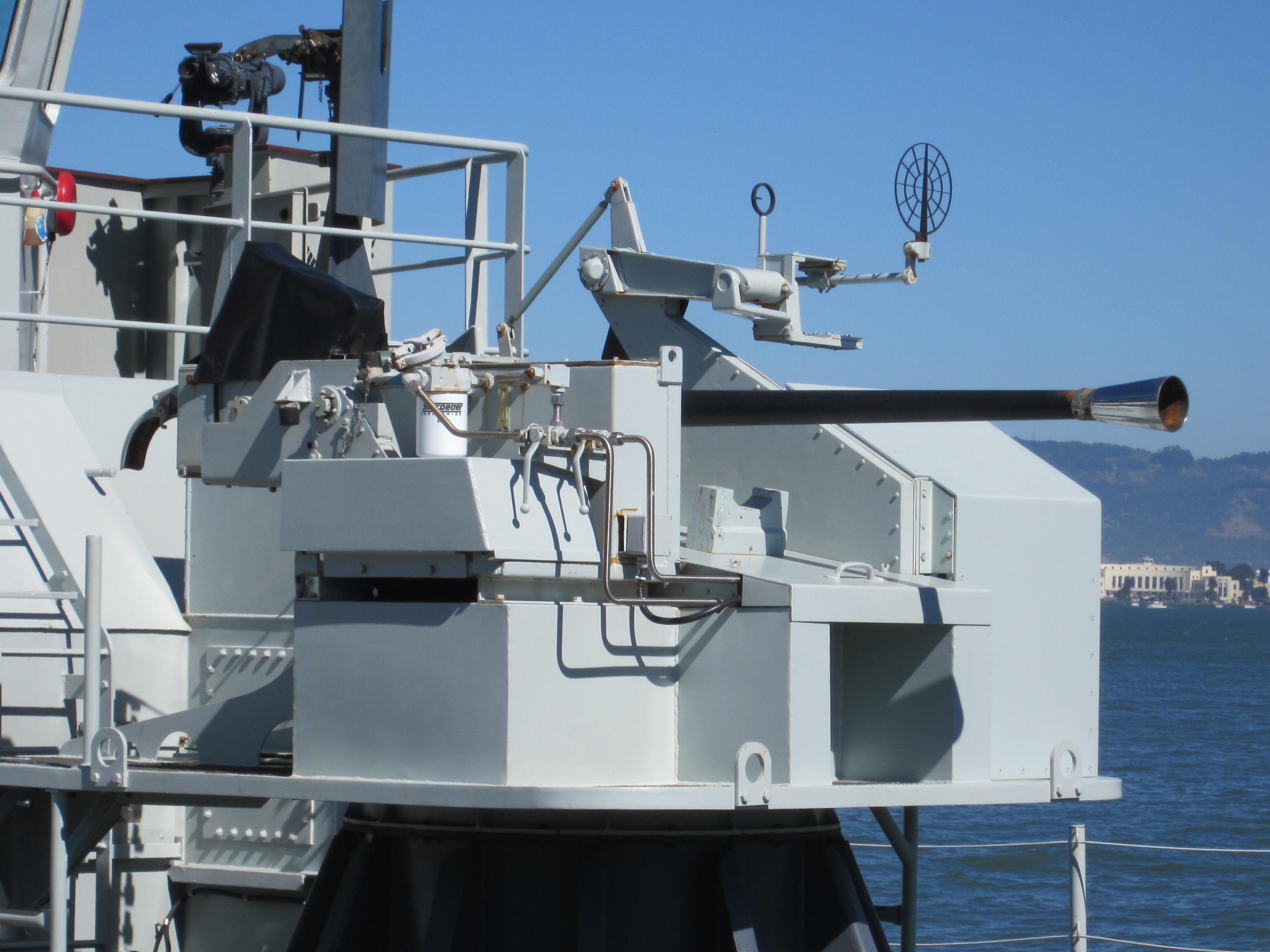
A Bofors 40 mm L/60 gun aboard HMCS Brandon

The Kingston class were initially armed with a single Bofors 40-millimetre (1.6 in)/60 calibre (Note: The /60 after the calibre denotes the length of the gun. This means that the length of the gun barrel is 60 times the bore diameter.) Mk 1N/1 anti-aircraft gun mounted in a Mk 5C Boffin mount and two single 12.7 mm (0.50 in) Browning M2 machine guns. The Bofors guns were refurbished World War II models that had been previously used by the Canadian Army for air defence in Europe. The Bofors gun was mounted on the forecastle deck until their removal in 2014. The machine guns are mounted on either side at the front of the bridge deck. The 40 mm guns were used as monuments after being dismounted. In October 2006, Maritime Command experimented with mounting a remote controlled heavy machine gun station, the OTO Melara 12.7 mm RCHMG, in place of the 40 mm Bofors cannon aboard Summerside. The Nanuk .50 calibre RCWS from Rheinmetall was trialled as a replacement aboard HMCS Goose Bay in 2018. All twelve ships have degaussing coil arrays fitted, but only the first three ships have the control system, with it situated between the two funnels.

=== Modular payload ===
On the aft sweep deck, there are three positions that can receive a variety of mission payloads in the form of 6.1-metre (20 ft) ISO containers. The Royal Canadian Navy has a limited number of each mission payload;

- Two Indal Technologies AN/SLQ-38 deep mechanical minesweeping systems
- Four MDA Ltd. AN/SQS-511 heavyweight high-definition Route Survey System
- One ISE Ltd. Trailblazer bottom object inspection vehicle
- One ISE Ltd. HYSUB 50 deep seabed intervention system
- Fullerton and Sherwood Ltd. six-man, two-compartment containerised diving systems
- MDA Ltd. Interim Remote Minehunting and Disposal System control van

Furthermore, the vessels have additional systems not in an ISO container format that can be fitted, including;

- Two L3/Klein K 5500 high definition side scan sonars
- Four L3/Klein K 3000 dual frequency side scan sonars
- Two Deep Ocean Engineering Inc. Phantom 4 remotely operated vehicles (ROV)

The modules are split between the naval bases on each coast. The Trailblazer module is based at CFB Esquimalt, there are two route survey modules per coast, and the two minesweeping modules are located at CFB Halifax. In November 2009, the Boeing Insitu ScanEagle unmanned aerial vehicle was successfully trialled aboard a Kingston-class vessel.

=== Modernisation ===
The Royal Canadian Navy discarded a $100-million mid-life refit plan for the twelve vessels in this class, which was intended to extend the "mid-lifed" vessels lifespan through 2045–2055. While the navy concluded that the money would be better spent in acquiring a new platform, the Liberal Government's 2017 defence policy statement, Strong, Secure and Engaged, did not reference replacing these vessels. The naval review listed low speed and small size as reasons for the MCDV being inadequate for patrol duties (both are factors of the original specification). Notwithstanding the success of the ships in their deployment, critics suggest that patrol and training were tacked onto the mine-countermeasures role and that the platform lacks serious armament for a sovereignty enforcement role.

In October 2011, L-3 MAPPS was awarded a contract to supply degaussing systems for the Kingston-class ships. The advanced degaussing systems were to be delivered and supported locally in collaboration with SAM Electronics. In November 2012 MacDonald, Dettwiler and Associates was awarded a two-year $13.4 million contract to repair and upgrade the deployable sonar systems.

In 2018, the Royal Canadian Navy acquired the unmanned aerial vehicle AeroVironment Puma II AE with Mantis i45 Sensor for use on the Kingston class.

== Construction and career ==
In May 1992, a $650 million contract was awarded to Halifax Shipyards of Halifax, Nova Scotia, to construct twelve ships of the class. The vessels would be tasked with coastal patrol, minesweeping, law enforcement, pollution surveillance and search and rescue duties. Steel cutting for the first ship begin in December 1993, and by July 1999 all twelve Kingston-class ships were in service.

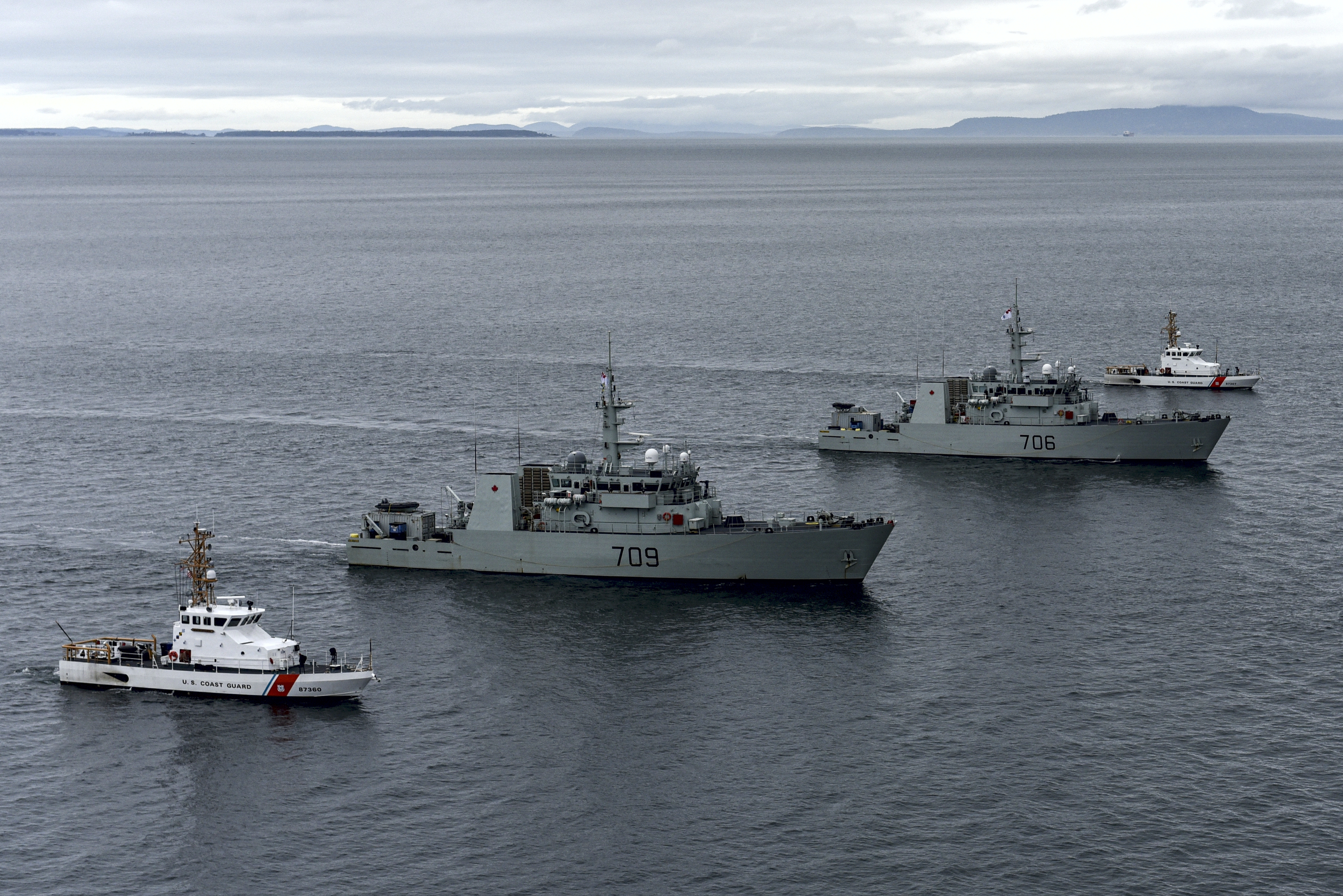
HMCS Yellowknife, HMCS Saskatoon with two US Coast Guard patrol boats during a counter-narcotics naval operations, February 2022

The ships are evenly distributed between the east and west coasts. One vessel on each coast is maintained for rapid deployment: this responsibility is rotated amongst the ships. The Kingston-class ships deploy regularly as part of Operation Caribbe in the Caribbean Sea and the Central American Pacific coast. The ships also deploy to the Arctic as part of Operation Nanook, and in naval exercises off the west coast of Africa and in the Baltic Sea among others. On 13 May 2010, it was announced that six of the twelve MCDVs would be placed in extended readiness due to lack of funds and the inability of the Naval Reserve to provide sufficient personnel to man the ships. However, on 14 May that order was rescinded.

In August 2023, it was reported that the Department of National Defence had "initiated the project to inform timely governmental decision-making about a potential replacement" for the class. In late 2023, the commander of the Royal Canadian Navy, Vice-Admiral Angus Topshee, reported that given serious personnel shortages in the force, regular crewing of many of the Kingston-class vessels had to be suspended in order to prioritize manning requirements for higher priority platforms such as the Halifax-class frigates.

On 24 July 2025, the Royal Canadian Navy announced that the Kingston class will begin to be paid off and retired starting in late 2025. Eight ships are planned to be retired in 2025, followed by one (Yellowknife) in 2026, one (Edmonton) in 2027 and the final two (Moncton and Nanaimo) in 2028. On 29 September 2025, the first three vessels, Brandon, Saskatoon, and Whitehorse, were paid off. Glace Bay, Goose Bay, Kingston, Shawinigan, and Summerside were paid off at Halifax on 3 October.

== Ships in class ==
Kingston class
Pennant	Name	Builder	Laid down	Launched	Commissioned	Paid off	Homeport	Status	Image
MM 700	Kingston	Halifax Shipyards, Halifax, Nova Scotia	12 December 1994	12 August 1995	21 September 1996	3 October 2025	CFB Halifax	Paid off	
MM 701	Glace Bay	Halifax Shipyards, Halifax, Nova Scotia	28 April 1995	22 January 1996	26 October 1996	3 October 2025	CFB Halifax	Paid off	
MM 702	Nanaimo	Halifax Shipyards, Halifax, Nova Scotia	11 August 1995	17 May 1996	10 May 1997		CFB Esquimalt, Relocated to CFB Halifax (2025)	Active	
MM 703	Edmonton	Halifax Shipyards, Halifax, Nova Scotia	8 December 1995	31 October 1996	21 June 1997		CFB Halifax	Active	
MM 704	Shawinigan	Halifax Shipyards, Halifax, Nova Scotia	26 April 1996	15 November 1996	14 June 1997	3 October 2025	CFB Halifax	Paid off	
MM 705	Whitehorse	Halifax Shipyards, Halifax, Nova Scotia	26 July 1996	24 February 1997	17 April 1998	29 September 2025	CFB Esquimalt	Paid off	
MM 706	Yellowknife	Halifax Shipyards, Halifax, Nova Scotia	7 November 1996	5 June 1997	18 April 1998		CFB Halifax	Active	
MM 707	Goose Bay	Halifax Shipyards, Halifax, Nova Scotia	22 February 1997	4 September 1997	26 July 1998	3 October 2025	CFB Halifax	Paid off	
MM 708	Moncton	Halifax Shipyards, Halifax, Nova Scotia	31 May 1997	5 December 1997	12 July 1998		CFB Halifax	Active	
MM 709	Saskatoon	Halifax Shipyards, Halifax, Nova Scotia	5 September 1997	30 March 1998	5 December 1998	29 September 2025	CFB Esquimalt	Paid off	
MM 710	Brandon	Halifax Shipyards, Halifax, Nova Scotia	6 December 1997	10 July 1998	5 June 1999	29 September 2025	CFB Esquimalt	Paid off	
MM 711	Summerside	Halifax Shipyards, Halifax, Nova Scotia	28 March 1998	26 September 1998	18 July 1999	3 October 2025	CFB Halifax	Paid off	

== Planned replacement ==
With the phased retirement of the Kingston-class beginning in late 2025, the navy plans to transfer the ships' roles to existing platforms and units, while an expanded fleet of Orca-class vessels will take on the training role that the Kingston class provided.

In 2024, the Department of National Defence established the Canadian Multi-Mission Corvette program to replace the Kingston-class vessels. By early 2025, however, the program was rebranded to the Continental Defence Corvette program, reflecting the significant expansion of the program's scope and requirements which moved beyond direct replacement of the existing ships. Funding has yet to be allocated for the replacement program.

In August 2025, a Department of National Defence spokesman said that the replacement corvette could include features like 16-cell vertical launch system which would provide a Halifax-equivalent capabilities for missions not requiring high-end combat system.

In May 2026, the Canadian government stated that they would soon issue a request for information for the Continental Defence Corvette program. The program would procure 16–20 corvettes, at a cost of $5 billion. The corvettes should have a range of 7,000 nautical miles (13,000 km; 8,100 mi) and according to the Commander of the Royal Canadian Navy Angus Topshee, "have the fight of the Halifax class." The contracts are expected to be awarded in 2030, with the first ship operational by 2039.

== See also ==
- Visby-class corvette
- Baynunah-class corvette
- Nornen-class patrol vessel
