= HMCS Windsor =

Royal Canadian Navy hunter-killer submarine

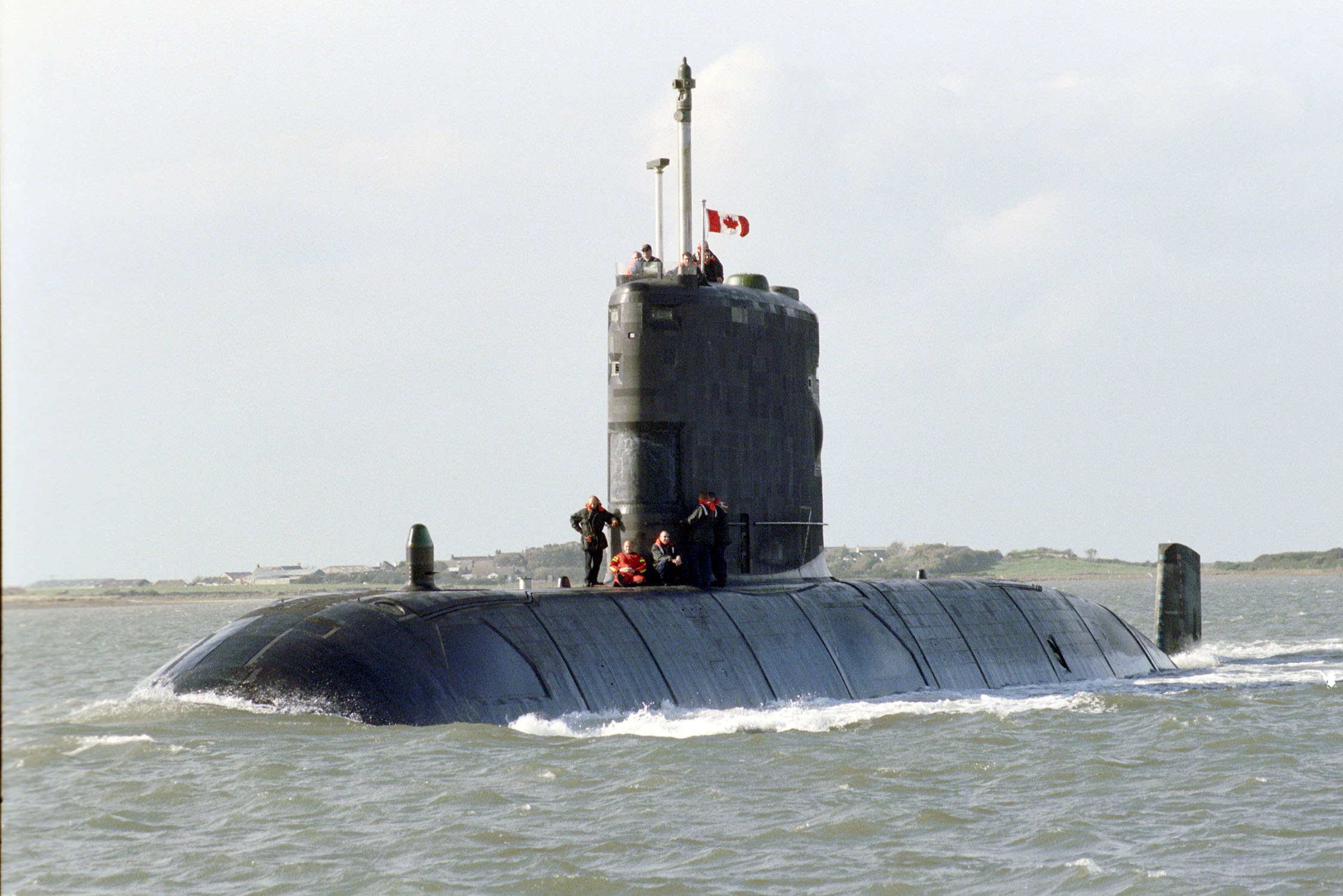
- Windsor underway

History

United Kingdom
- Name: Unicorn
- Builder: Cammell Laird, Birkenhead
- Laid down: 13 March 1990
- Launched: 16 April 1992
- Commissioned: 25 June 1993
- Decommissioned: 16 October 1994
- Fate: Transferred to Canada 1998

Canada
- Name: Windsor
- Acquired: 6 August 2001
- Commissioned: 4 October 2003 (Note: The Canadian Department of National Defence has a different commissioning date for the submarine, on 29 September 2001, according to the official lineage.)
- Motto: “Silent Pride”
- Status: in active service
- Notes: Colours: Gold and Blue
- Badge

General characteristics
- Class & type: Upholder/Victoria-class submarine
- Displacement: 2,185 long tons (2,220 t) surfaced; 2,400 long tons (2,439 t) submerged
- Length: 70.26 m (230 ft 6 in)
- Beam: 7.6 m (24 ft 11 in)
- Draught: 5.5 m (18 ft 1 in)
- Propulsion: Diesel-electric (37 MW (50,000 hp)); 2 Paxman Valenta 16 RPA diesel generators, 4,070 hp (3,030 kW); 2 GEC, 5,000 kW (6,700 hp) motor-generators
- Speed: 12 knots (22 km/h; 14 mph) surfaced; 20 kn (23 mph; 37 km/h)+ submerged
- Range: 10,000 nautical miles (19,000 km) at 12 knots (22 km/h)
- Test depth: 200 m (660 ft)
- Complement: 53 officers and crew
- Armament: 6 × 21 in (533 mm) torpedo tubes; 18 × Mark 48 torpedoes

HMCS Windsor is a long-range hunter-killer (SSK) submarine of the Royal Canadian Navy, the second submarine of the Victoria class. She is named after the city of Windsor, Ontario. Built for the Royal Navy as the Upholder-class submarine HMS Unicorn (pennant number S43) she was purchased by Canada when the United Kingdom decided to move to an all-nuclear power fleet.

== Design ==
As built the Upholder/Victoria class was designed as a replacement for the Oberon class for use as hunter-killer and training subs. The submarines, which have a single-skinned, teardrop-shaped hull, displace 2,220 long tons (2,260 t) surfaced and 2,455 long tons (2,494 t) submerged. They are 230 feet 7 inches (70.3 m) long overall with a beam of 25 feet 0 inches (7.6 m) and a draught of 17 feet 8 inches (5.4 m).

The submarines are powered by a one shaft diesel-electric system. They are equipped with two Paxman Valenta 1600 RPS SZ diesel engines each driving a 1.4-megawatt (1,900 hp) GEC electric alternator with two 120-cell chloride batteries. The batteries have a 90-hour endurance at 3 knots (5.6 km/h; 3.5 mph). The submarine is propelled by a 5,000-kilowatt (6,700 hp) GEC dual armature electric motor turning a seven-blade fixed pitch propeller. They have a 200-long-ton (200 t) diesel capacity. This gives the subs a maximum speed of 12 knots (22 km/h; 14 mph) on the surface and 20 knots (37 km/h; 23 mph) submerged. They have a range of 8,000 nautical miles (15,000 km; 9,200 mi) at 8 knots (15 km/h; 9.2 mph) and 10,000 nautical miles (19,000 km; 12,000 mi) at snorting depth. The class has a reported dive depth of over 650 feet (200 m).

The Upholder/Victoria class are armed with six 21-inch (533 mm) torpedo tubes. In British service, the submarines were equipped with 14 Tigerfish Mk 24 Mod 2 torpedoes and four UGM-84 Sub-Harpoon missiles. They could also be adapted for use as a minelayer. The submarines have Type 1007 radar and Type 2040, Type 2019, Type 2007 and Type 2046 sonar installed. The hull is fitted with elastomeric acoustic tiles to reduce acoustic signature. In British service the vessels had a complement of 7 officers and 40 ratings.

=== Refits and Canadian alterations ===
During the refit for Canadian service, the Sub-Harpoon and mine capabilities were removed and the submarines were equipped with the Lockheed Martin Librascope Submarine fire-control system (SFCS) to meet the operational requirements of the Canadian Navy. Components from the fire control system of the Oberon-class submarines were installed. This gave the submarines the ability to fire the Gould Mk 48 Mod 4 torpedo. In 2014, the Government of Canada purchased 12 upgrade kits that will allow the submarines to fire the Mk 48 Mod 7AT torpedoes.

These radar and sonar systems were later upgraded with the installation of the BAE Type 2007 array and the Type 2046 towed array. The Canadian Towed Array Sonar (CANTASS) has been integrated into the towed sonar suite. The Upholder-class submarines were equipped with the CK035 electro-optical search periscope and the CH085 optronic attack periscope, originally supplied by Pilkington Optronics. After the Canadian refit, the submarines were equipped with Canadian communication equipment and electronic support measures (ESM). This included two SSE decoy launchers and the AR 900 ESM.

== Operational history ==
=== Royal Navy ===
The submarine was laid down as HMS Unicorn at Cammell Laird's Birkenhead yard on 13 March 1990. She was launched on 16 April 1992, and commissioned into the Royal Navy on 25 June 1993. She was the last ship built at Cammell Laird until construction began on HMS Queen Elizabeth in June 2010.

After entering service, Unicorn operated in the Mediterranean Sea and east of Suez, the Gulf of Oman and Indian Ocean and in the Persian Gulf. She returned to Devonport and was decommissioned on 16 October 1994.

=== Transfer ===
Looking to discontinue the operation of diesel-electric boats, the British government offered to sell Unicorn and her sister submarines to Canada in 1993. The offer was accepted in 1998. The four boats were leased to Canada for US$427 million (plus US$98 million for upgrades and alteration to Canadian standards), with the lease to run for eight years; after this, the submarines would be sold for £1.

Problems were discovered with the piping welds on all four submarines, which delayed the reactivation of Unicorn and her three sisters. Unicorn was handed over to the Canadian Forces on 6 August 2001 and sailed to Canada, arriving on 19 October. The submarine was commissioned into Maritime Command as HMCS Windsor with the hull number SSK 877 on 4 October 2003.

=== Royal Canadian Navy ===
Windsor is the only Canadian submarine deployed in the Atlantic. In April 2002, after departing for the submarine's first training mission, Windsor was forced to return to port after the discovery of a faulty seal in the communications mast. From 27–30 September 2004, Windsor took reporters and photographers from Halifax and Windsor newspapers to document life aboard a submarine. During April 2006, the submarine was involved in the naval exercise Joint Express.

In 2007 the submarine entered Halifax for refit. Originally scheduled for completion in two years, the refit was still not complete as of early 2011. During the refit, rust was discovered which will restrict the maximum depth to which the submarine can safely dive. According to reports, due to unexpected problems, the refit suffered delays and cost overruns. These included bad welds in the hull, broken torpedo tubes, a faulty rudder and tiles on the side of the sub that continually fell off. In 2010, the Royal Canadian Navy spent $45 million on repairs to Windsor for which it had budgeted $17 million. The refit began in 2007 and was scheduled to be completed in 2009. The submarine was relaunched on 11 April 2012. After being out of the water for five years, Windsor was lowered back into the water. The submarine was then guided out of the lift area to a nearby dock where the submarine remained for more testing until sea trials.

Shortly afterwards one of the engines was declared unusable, and Windsor was drydocked in March 2014. Work was scheduled to be completed in September at a projected cost of $1.5 million. The work was expanded in June to incorporate other maintenance needs on the submarine as well as a main sonar system upgrade for a total cost of $18 million. On 8 October 2014, Windsor completed her dry-dock maintenance and upgrade cycle and was re-floated.

In Fall 2015, Windsor deployed for large NATO naval exercises Joint Warrior and Trident Venture with Athabaskan, Halifax, Montréal, Goose Bay and Summerside, returning on 17 December. On 15 February 2016, while operating off the US East coast, one of her batteries was found leaking a discharge. The submarine put into Norfolk, Virginia where she awaited specialists from Canada to arrive. After repairs were performed at Norfolk, Windsor returned to Halifax in March 2016.

The submarine deployed in June 2016 to participate in NATO naval exercises off the coast of Norway. However, while in transit, one of the submarine's diesel generators refused to engage. The submarine returned to Halifax for repairs, which were effected and the submarine sailed for Europe a week later. The submarine returned to Halifax on 9 August. In September Windsor was among the Canadian warships deployed to the NATO naval training exercise "Cutlass Fury" off the east coast of North America. Beginning in February 2017, Windsor deployed into the Atlantic Ocean, taking part in a NATO naval exercise and monitoring sea traffic in shipping lanes. The submarine returned to Halifax on 20 June 2018.

In September 2023, the submarine suffered a flooding incident in which three sailors were injured. Although scheduled to participate in a 14-day multi-national exercise, Windsor was compelled to return to Halifax where repairs were expected to take four weeks.
