= HMCS Corner Brook =

Royal Canadian Navy hunter-killer submarine

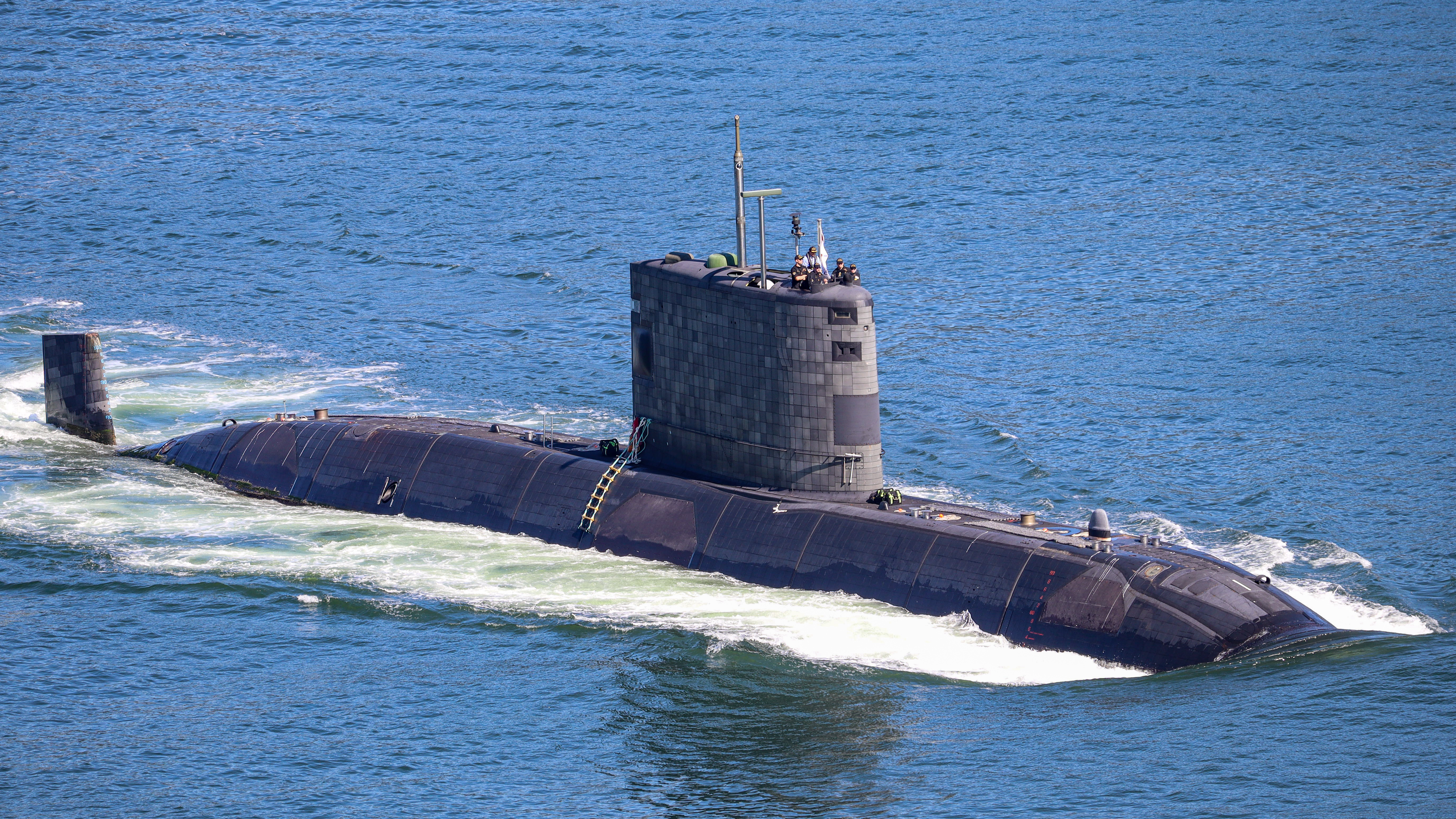
- HMCS Corner Brook in Burrard Inlet

History

United Kingdom
- Name: Ursula
- Builder: Cammell Laird, Birkenhead
- Laid down: 10 January 1989
- Launched: 22 February 1991
- Commissioned: 8 May 1992
- Decommissioned: 16 October 1994
- Fate: Transferred to Canada

Canada
- Name: Corner Brook
- Acquired: 1998
- Commissioned: 29 June 2003
- Motto: We rule the sea
- Status: In active service
- Badge

General characteristics
- Class & type: Upholder/Victoria-class submarine
- Displacement: 2,185 long tons (2,220 t) surfaced; 2,400 long tons (2,439 t) submerged
- Length: 70.26 m (230 ft 6 in)
- Beam: 7.6 m (24 ft 11 in)
- Draught: 5.5 m (18 ft 1 in)
- Propulsion: Diesel-electric (37 MW); 2 Paxman Valenta 16 RPA diesel generators, 4,070 hp (3,035 kW); 2 GEC 5,000 kW motor-generators
- Speed: 12 knots (22 km/h; 14 mph) surfaced; 20 kn (37 km/h; 23 mph)+ submerged
- Range: 10,000 nautical miles (18,500 km) at 12 knots (22 km/h)
- Test depth: 200 m (660 ft)
- Complement: 59 officers and crew
- Armament: 6 × 21 in (533 mm) torpedo tubes; 18 × Mark 48 Mod 7 AT torpedoes

HMCS Corner Brook (SSK 878) is a long-range hunter-killer submarine (SSK) of the Royal Canadian Navy. She is the former Royal Navy Upholder-class submarine HMS Ursula (S42), purchased from the British at the end of the Cold War. She is the third boat of the Victoria class and is named after the city of Corner Brook, Newfoundland. The submarine was launched in 1989 and entered service with the Royal Navy in 1992. The Royal Navy laid Ursula up in 1994. In 1998, Canada acquired the submarine from the United Kingdom. The vessel entered service with the Canadian Armed Forces in 2003. Renamed Corner Brook, the submarine took part in several military exercises both internationally, such as NATO exercises and domestic, such as Operation Nanook. In June 2011, the submarine ran aground in Nootka Sound, damaging the vessel's bow. The submarine was sent for refit in 2014. In April 2025, she was back to full capability.

== Design ==
As built the Upholder class was designed as a replacement for the Oberon class for use as hunter-killer and training subs. The submarines, which have a single-skinned, teardrop-shaped hull, displace 2,220 long tons (2,260 t) surfaced and 2,455 long tons (2,494 t) submerged. They are 230 feet 7 inches (70.3 m) long overall with a beam of 25 feet 0 inches (7.6 m) and a draught of 17 feet 8 inches (5.4 m).

The submarines are powered by a one shaft diesel-electric system. They are equipped with two Paxman Valenta 1600 RPS SZ diesel engines each driving a 1.4-megawatt (1,900 hp) GEC electric alternator with two 120-cell chloride batteries. The batteries have a 90-hour endurance at 3 knots (5.6 km/h; 3.5 mph). The ship is propelled by a 4.028-megawatt (5,402 hp) GEC dual armature electric motor turning a seven-blade fixed pitch propeller. They have a 200-long-ton (200 t) diesel capacity. This gives the subs a maximum speed of 12 knots (22 km/h; 14 mph) on the surface and 20 knots (37 km/h; 23 mph) submerged. They have a range of 8,000 nautical miles (15,000 km; 9,200 mi) at 8 knots (15 km/h; 9.2 mph) and 10,000 nautical miles (19,000 km; 12,000 mi) at snorkling depth. They have a range of 8,000 nautical miles (15,000 km; 9,200 mi) at 8 knots (15 km/h; 9.2 mph). The class has a reported dive depth of over 650 feet (200 m).

The Victoria-class boats are armed with six 21-inch (533 mm) torpedo tubes. In British service, the submarines were equipped with 14 Tigerfish Mk 24 Mod 2 torpedoes and four UGM-84 Sub-Harpoon missiles. They could also be adapted for use as a minelayer. The submarines have Type 1007 radar and Type 2040, Type 2019, Type 2007 and Type 2046 sonar installed. The hull is fitted with elastomeric acoustic tiles to reduce acoustic signature. In British service the vessels had a complement of seven officers and 40 ratings.

=== Refits and Canadian alterations ===
During the refit for Canadian service, the Sub-Harpoon and mine capabilities were removed and the submarines were equipped with the Lockheed Martin Librascope Submarine fire-control system (SFCS) to meet the operational requirements of the Royal Canadian Navy. Components from the fire control system of the Oberon-class submarines were installed. This gave the submarines the ability to fire the Gould Mk 48 Mod 4 torpedo. In 2014, the Government of Canada purchased 12 upgrade kits that will allow the submarines to fire the Mk 48 Mod 7AT torpedoes.

These radar and sonar systems were later upgraded with the installation of the BAE Type 2007 array and the Type 2046 towed array. The Canadian Towed Array Sonar (CANTASS) has been integrated into the towed sonar suite. The Upholder-class submarines were equipped with the CK035 electro-optical search periscope and the CH085 optronic attack periscope, originally supplied by Pilkington Optronics. After the Canadian refit, the submarines were equipped with Canadian communication equipment and electronic support measures (ESM). This included two SSE decoy launchers and the AR 900 ESM.

== Construction and career ==
The submarine was laid down as HMS Ursula at Cammell Laird's Birkenhead yard on 10 January 1989. She was launched on 28 February 1991 and commissioned into the Royal Navy on 8 May 1992. Ursula was decommissioned on 16 October 1994.

Looking to discontinue the operation of diesel-electric boats, the British government offered to sell Ursula and her sister submarines to Canada in 1993. The offer was accepted in 1998. The four boats were leased to Canada for US$427 million (plus US$98 million for upgrades and alteration to Canadian standards), with the lease to run for eight years; the submarines would then be sold for £1.

Problems were discovered with the piping welds on all four submarines, which delayed the reactivation of ex-Ursula and her three sisters. The former Ursula was handed over to the Canadian Forces on 21 February 2003, and commissioned as HMCS Corner Brook on 29 June 2003.

=== Royal Canadian Navy ===
After commissioning, Corner Brook was deployed on the east coast of Canada, based out of Halifax, Nova Scotia. During a refit in 2006, elevated levels of lead were detected aboard the submarine; they were believed to come from the lead-brick ballast blocks used aboard Corner Brook. Between October 2006 and January 2008, Corner Brook was active for only 81 days. The submarine participated in NATO exercise Noble Mariner during May 2007. During the exercise, which occurred in the Baltic region, Corner Brook successfully closed with the aircraft carrier HMS Illustrious without being detected. The submarine returned to Canada, and in August, she participated in Operation Nanook, a sovereignty exercise held in and around Iqaluit and the Baffin Island coastal and Hudson Strait areas. That year, Corner Brook participated in the NATO exercise Noble Warrior, marking the first time in 15 years that a Canadian submarine had been present in European waters.

In February 2008, Corner Brook departed from Halifax during a snowstorm for a three-month deployment to the Caribbean Sea. As part of the deployment, the submarine operated with the United States Joint Interagency Task Force South, which attempts to counter drug trafficking, people smuggling and piracy in the region. Corner Brook returned to Halifax in May.

In January 2009, Corner Brook was the target for submarine detection exercises performed by HMCS Halifax and Montréal. This was followed by a four-week, multi-ship training exercise in the North Atlantic during February and March, then participation in the UNITAS multinational exercise off Florida during late April and early May. During August, the submarine was involved in Operation Nanook 2009 conducting covert surveillance patrols in the vicinity of Baffin Island.

Early in 2011, Corner Brook took part in Operation Caribbe, before transiting to the west coast as part of her redeployment to Esquimalt, British Columbia. On 4 June 2011 the submarine ran aground in Nootka Sound during manoeuvres off Vancouver Island. The submarine collided with the sea floor in 45 metres (148 ft) of water while travelling at a speed of 5.9 knots (11 km/h). The collision opened a 2-metre (6 ft 7 in) hole in the submarine's bow. Two submariners were slightly injured. After the grounding incident civilian and military submariners began pre-maintenance work on the submarine, in the expectation of an extended maintenance program. At the time, the process, length and cost of the work was unknown due to existing contracts. A board of inquiry formed after the collision found that the cause of the collision had been human error. In February 2012, post-collision photos of the dry-docked submarine were published, showing extensive damage to the bow; the media also cited unofficial sources, saying the pressure hull may be damaged beyond repair.

As of July 2014, Corner Brook began her extended docking work period (EDWP) that was expected to take until 2017 to complete. On 1 April 2019 the submarine, still in drydock at CFB Esquimalt, caught fire. The fire was extinguished but the cause was unknown. The vessel was intended to return to service in mid-2020. However, in a March 2020 pressure test of the submarine's ballast tanks, the test team attempted to empty the tanks more quickly using pressured air, leading to over pressurization and a rupture. The submarine was fully repaired/upgraded and returned to active service on 2 April 2025. The submarine is expected to remain in service for another nine years following the refit.
