= Operation Megaphone =

2000 Canadian naval operation

Date	30 July 2000 to 6 August 2000
Location	Off the coast of Newfoundland, North Atlantic

Belligerents
Royal Canadian Navy	Third Ocean Marine Navigation Ltd., Maryland, USA (US civilian contractor)

Units involved
HMCS Athabaskan, HMCS Montréal	GTS Katie

Operation Megaphone was the Canadian naval operation to board a Vincentian-flagged, American-owned merchant ship in the Atlantic, in order to recover $223 million worth of military materiel being transported back to Canada at the conclusion of operations in Kosovo.

== Background ==
At the conclusion of Operation Kinetic, the Canadian contribution to a NATO peacekeeping force in Kosovo and Macedonia, the Department of National Defence contracted SDV Logistics Canada Ltd to transport military assets, including 580 vehicles, 390 sea containers of equipment and three Canadian soldiers who were escorting the cargo.

SDV Logistics subcontracted Andromeda Navigation Co. of Montreal, which chartered a St Vincent-flagged ship, GTS Katie (owned by Annapolis, Maryland-based Third Ocean Marine Navigation Company), to move the cargo.

The vessel was scheduled to leave Greece on 27 June 2000 and was to arrive in Canada on 15 July. Three Canadian military personnel were also on board the ship to escort the cargo, which included five armoured vehicles, rifles, ammunition, and communications equipment.

Prior to leaving Greece, three crew members had complained to authorities there, and the ship was restrained. Though it was not clear why the crew members complained, the ship was allowed to sail on 28 June after posting a US$30,000 bond.

During the voyage, a dispute between the various contracting parties arose over payments due, and Third Ocean claimed that $288,000 remained outstanding from Andromeda. As a result of the dispute, Third Ocean ordered the Russian captain of Katie, Vitaly Khlebnikov, not to enter Canadian waters.

== Boarding ==
Negotiations continued between the Canadian government and the shippers, however an ultimatum was given and the three contractors failed to reach an agreement by a certain deadline, according to Art Eggleton, then the Minister of National Defence.

A diplomatic note was sent to the government of St. Vincent and the Grenadines, where the ship was registered, who authorized Canadians to board the vessel.

On 30 July, the destroyer HMCS Athabaskan received orders to close with Katie about 225 kilometres off Newfoundland, in international waters, and maintain visual contact with her. The following day, the frigate HMCS Montréal joined Athabaskan.

At 1:45 pm on 3 August, fourteen sailors boarded Katie in a helicopter-borne assault from a Sea King, led by Captain Drew Robertson, during which the crew of Katie offered no resistance. Captain Khlebnikov would later complain the boarding of the ship was "dangerous" and described the boarding as an "attack", although Captain Robertson had observed that Katie began erratic, evasive manoeuvering after being warned of the imminent boarding.

Defence Minister Eggleton described the action as "fully within the bounds of international law."

== Aftermath ==
Katie arrived in Becancourt, Quebec, on 6 August under the control of the Canadian boarding party. Some of the cargo, including explosives, were removed at Becancourt, before the ship was brought further up the St Lawrence River to Montreal where the armoured and other military vehicles were unloaded.

Third Ocean filed an action in rem against the Canadian government, who owned the freight, on 27 July 2000, in the Federal Court of Canada, including a warrant for arrest of the freight. The matter was heard on 18 September, after the ship had already been seized by the Canadian navy. The court quashed the warrant and dismissed the action, on the basis of the immunity of the Crown, under the Crown Liability and Proceedings Act.

The Canadian Navy contracted Katie – and routinely contracts cargo ships – because it has no sea transport capability. The Canadian Forces have since then acquired four CC-177 Globemaster III strategic airlift cargo aircraft, each capable of carrying a payload of up to 72,000 kg, which were delivered in 2007. In 2010, shipbuilding was identified as a key procurement priority by the Canadian Forces, outlined in its Canada First Defence Strategy.
