= HDMS Vædderen =

Danish naval patrol vessel

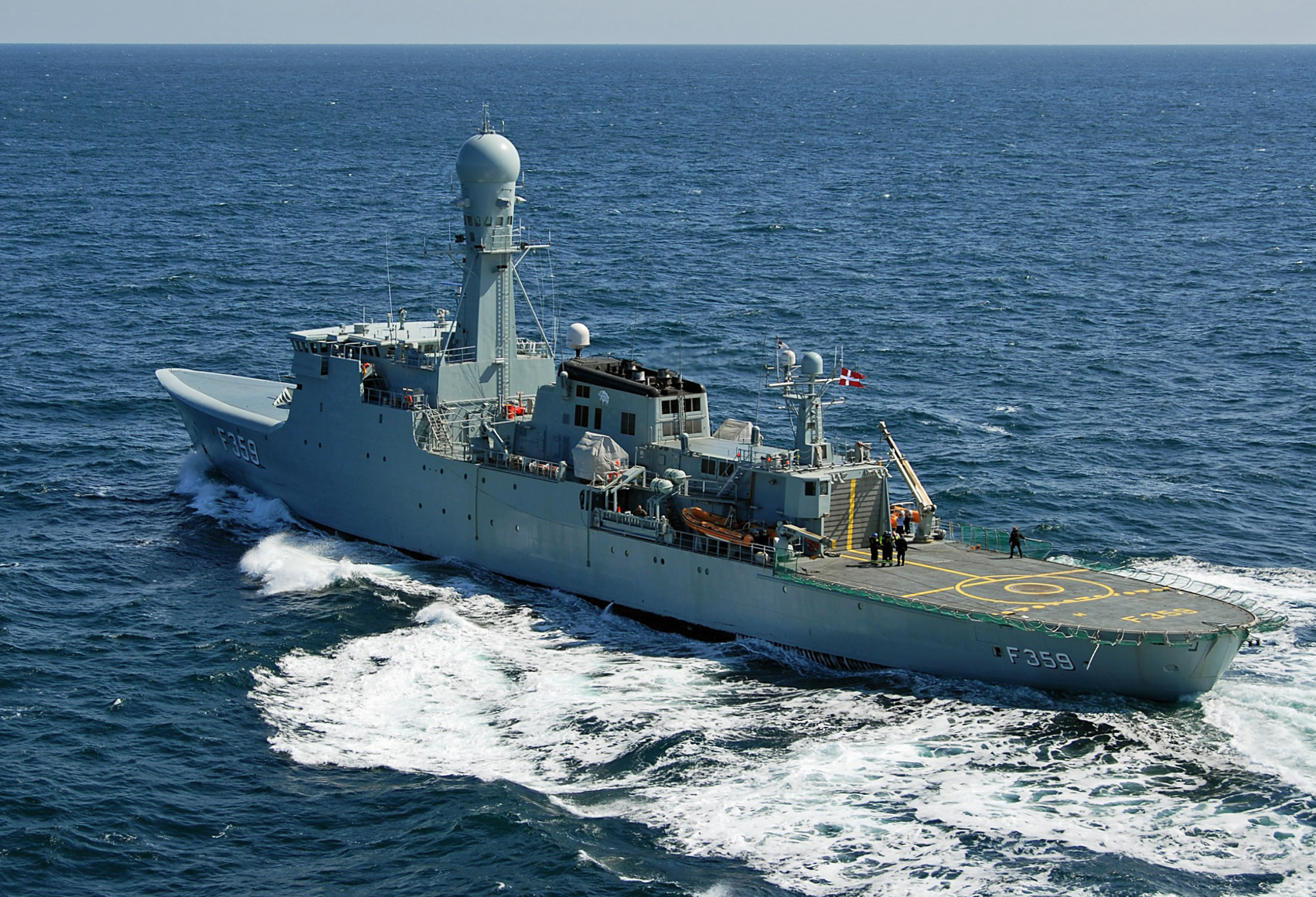
- HDMS Vædderen (F359) in the Atlantic, March 2008

History

Kingdom of Denmark
- Name: Vædderen
- Builder: Svendborg Shipyard Ltd.
- Laid down: March 22, 1990
- Launched: December 21, 1990
- In service: June 9, 1992
- Identification: MMSI number: 219524000; Callsign: OUEW
- Badge

General characteristics
- Class & type: Thetis-class frigate
- Displacement: 3,500 tons
- Length: 112.5 m (369 ft)
- Beam: 14.5 m (48 ft)
- Draft: 6 m (20 ft)
- Complement: 61
- Armament: 1 x 76-mm 62-cal. OTO Melara Super Rapid DP; 7 x 12.7 mm heavy machine guns; 4 x 7.62 mm light machine guns; 1 x depth charge rack and MU90 Advanced Lightweight Torpedo for anti-submarine warfare
- Aircraft carried: 1 × Westland Lynx Mk90B. From approx. 2016: MH-60R

HDMS (His Danish Majesty's Ship) Vædderen (F359) is a Thetis-class ocean patrol vessel of the Royal Danish Navy. She is employed to exercise Danish sovereignty in waters around the Faroe Islands and Greenland.

Vædderen (Aries) was refitted at Karstensens Shipyard A/S in Skagen, Denmark and sailed from Amailiehaven, Copenhagen in August 2006 on the Galathea 3 scientific expedition. Galathea 3 is now complete and Vædderen is back in service as an inspection ship.

In August 2010 Vædderen and HDMS Knud Rasmussen participated in the fourth annual Operation Nanook 2010 with Canadian and American vessels in Baffin Bay and the Davis Straits.

In June 2025, Vædderen represented the Danish in Operation Cutlass Fury, a biennial anti-submarine warfare exercise alongside the American, Royal, and Royal Canadian navies, off the coast of Halifax, Nova Scotia. After the exercise ended, she docked in Halifax to participate in the city's coinciding international fleet week, and was one of three ships doing ship tours for civilians.
