= HMCS Athabaskan =

Three Canadian naval ships have been named HMCS Athabaskan. All were named for the Athabaskan people and were destroyers. The first ship was British built, the other two were constructed in Canada.

- HMCS Athabaskan (G07), a Tribal-class destroyer, commissioned in 1943 and torpedoed in the English Channel off the French coast on 29 April 1944.
- HMCS Athabaskan (R79), later renumbered (DDE 219), was a Tribal-class destroyer commissioned in 1947. Scrapped 1970.
- HMCS Athabaskan (DDG 282) was an Iroquois-class destroyer, commissioned in 1972. She remained in service longer than her three sister ships, and was paid off in March 2017. She was scrapped in 2018.

== Battle honours ==
Ships named Athabaskan have earned the following battle honours;

- Arctic, 1943–44
- English Channel, 1944
- Korea, 1950–53
- Gulf and Kuwait
