= Operation Nanook =

Annual Canadian Armed Forces sovereignty operation

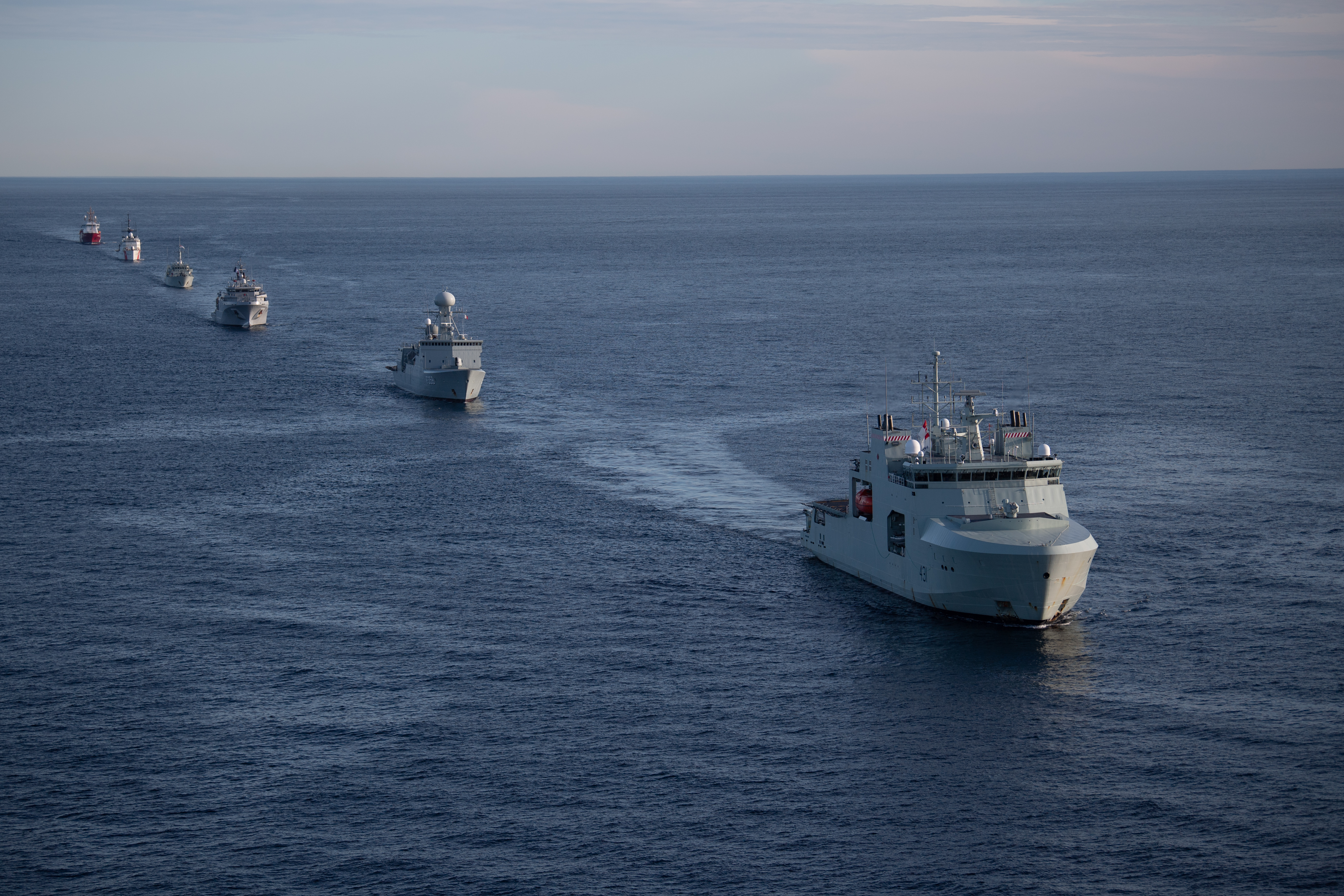
HMCS Margaret Brooke leads a multinational convoy during Operation Nanook 2022

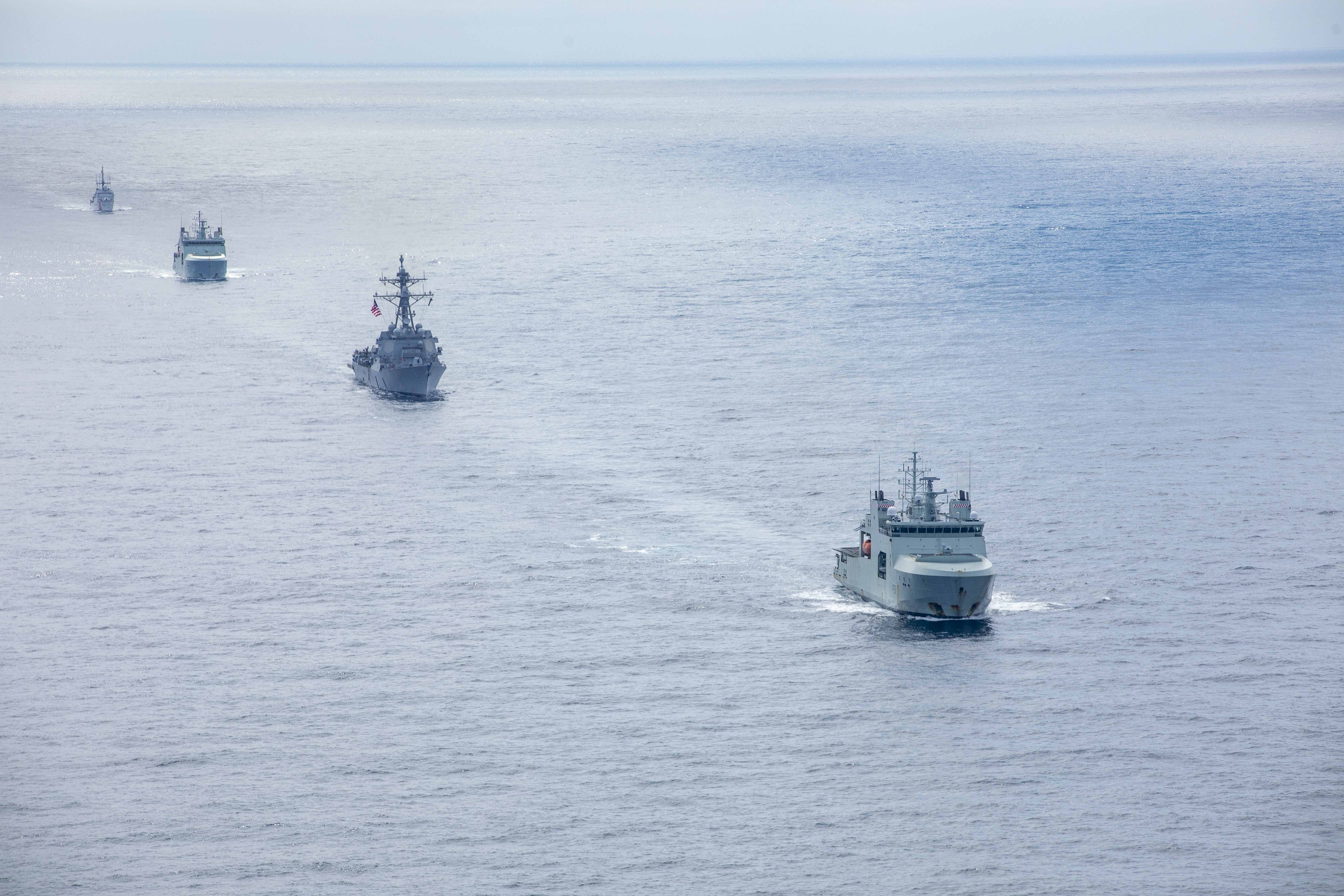
HMCS Harry DeWolf, Margaret Brooke, USS Delbert D. Black and USCGC Northland sail in formation during Operation Nanook 2024

Operation Nanook (OP NANOOK; French: Opération Nanook) is an annual sovereignty operation and manoeuvre warfare exercise conducted by the Canadian Armed Forces in the Arctic. Sovereignty patrols in the Canadian Arctic Archipelago and northern Canada are conducted by the Canadian Rangers, Canadian Coast Guard in tandem with the Royal Canadian Mounted Police. The exercise portion is intended to train the different elements of the Canadian Armed Forces (Canadian Army, Royal Canadian Air Force and Royal Canadian Navy) to operate in the Arctic environment, as well as promote cooperation with allies and close military partners such as the United States Navy and Royal Danish Navy. It can involve multiple components, which are conducted at different times, places and by different units.

== 2007 ==
Operation Nanook 2007 was the 2007 joint exercise of Maritime Command and the Canadian Coast Guard to train for disaster and sovereignty patrols in the Arctic. Similar exercises have been conducted every year since.

Elements of the Canadian Coast Guard and the Royal Canadian Mounted Police joined with elements of the Canadian Forces in the exercise. The Halifax-class frigate HMCS Fredericton, the Kingston-class coastal defence vessel HMCS Summerside, the Victoria-class submarine HMCS Corner Brook, CP-140 Aurora maritime patrol aircraft, reservists from the local Canadian Rangers, and Primary Reserve soldiers from across Canada composed the Canadian Forces component.

During the exercise Summerside played a drug smuggling vessel, nicknamed MV Rusty Bucket.

== 2008 ==
Operation Nanook 2008 was a joint exercise of Maritime Command and the Canadian Coast Guard, held in August 2008. Canada conducted a similar joint exercise, also named Operation Nanook, in 2007.

The exercise was held from 11 to 25 August 2008. Two Canadian warships and two air force planes, a CC-138 Twin Otter and a CP-140 Aurora, took part in the exercises in Canada's Arctic. The frigate HMCS Toronto, the minesweeper HMCS Shawinigan and the Canadian Coast Guard icebreaker CCGS Pierre Radisson travelled along the Hudson Strait. The operation extended to Davis Strait and Frobisher Bay.

There have been 18 such humanitarian operations since 2002. As more Arctic ice melts, the ships sail through uncharted waters. Emergency response times were tested for such potential disasters as oil spills, or rescue operations such as responding to cruise ship emergencies.

General Walter J. Natynczyk, Canada's chief of Defence staff, Peter MacKay, Defence Minister as well as Minister of the Atlantic Canada Opportunities Agency, and Steven Fletcher, Member of Parliament for Charleswood–St. James–Assiniboia and Parliamentary Secretary for Health, flew to Iqaluit, Nunavut, to officially launch the exercise on 19 August 2008 and observe the process.

== 2009 ==
Operation Nanook 2009 was the 2009 joint exercise of Maritime Command and the Canadian Coast Guard to train for disaster and sovereignty patrols in the Arctic. Similar exercises were held in 2007, 2008, 2010 and 2011.

The operation ran from 6 to 28 August 2009. In addition to CCGS Pierre Radisson the operations had the participation of elements of the Canadian Rangers, Primary Reserve soldiers from across Canada, a force of reservists composed of local residents of Nunavut, the frigate HMCS Toronto and the submarine HMCS Corner Brook, and Canadian Forces aircraft.

General Walter J. Natynczyk, Chief of Canada's Defence Staff attended the exercise. On 23 August 2009, Natynczyk met in Iqaluit with Admiral Tim Sloth Jørgensen, Chief of Denmark's Defence staff.

== 2010 ==
HDMS Vædderen, HMCS Montréal, and USS Porter proceed abreast during Operation Nanook in 2010

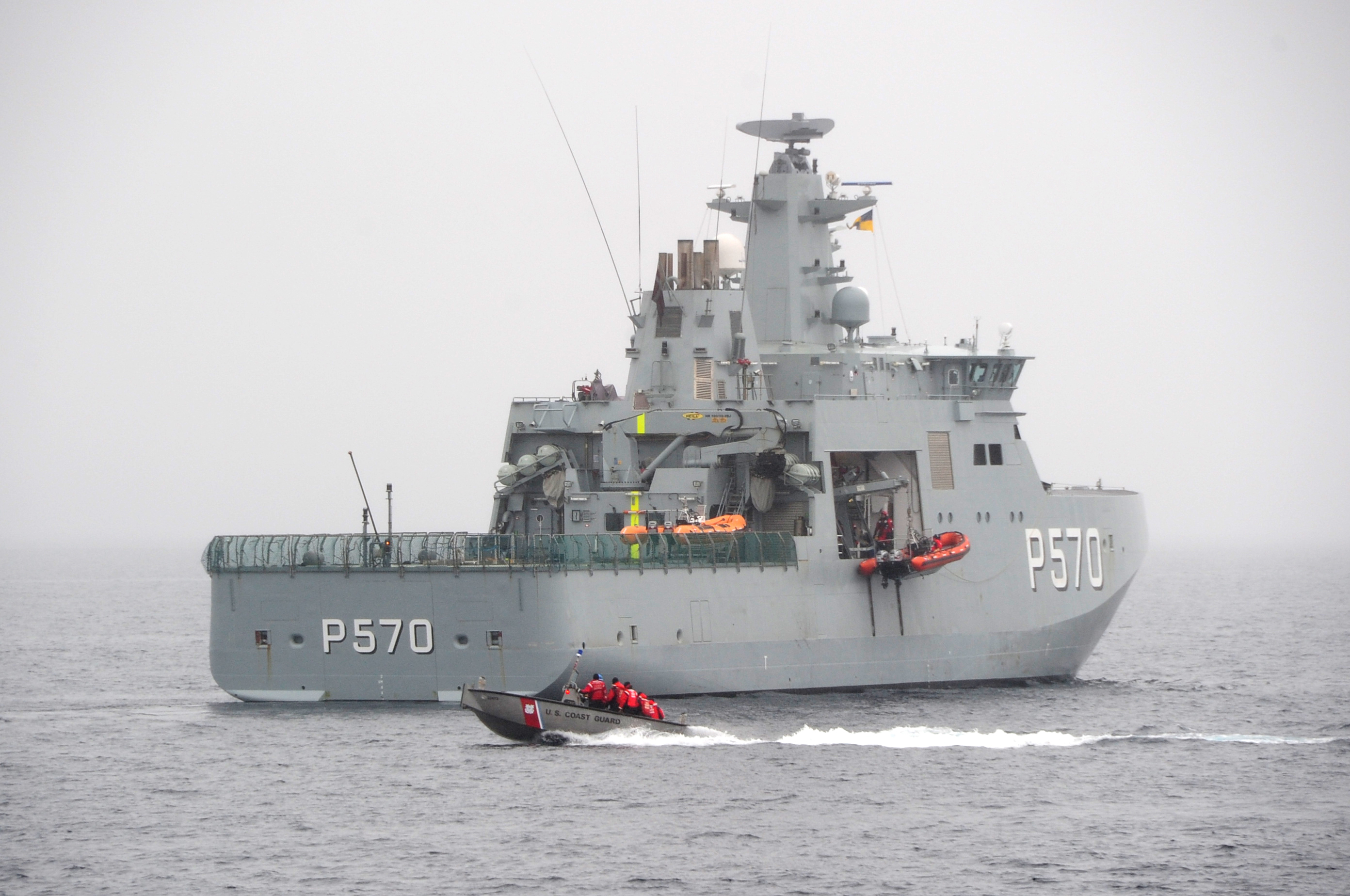
HDMS Knud Rasmussen participating in Operation Nanook 2010

Operation Nanook 2010 was the 2010 annual joint exercise of Maritime Command and the Canadian Coast Guard to train for disaster and sovereignty patrols in the Arctic. Similar exercises were held in 2007, 2008 and 2009. The operation ran from 6 to 26 August 2010. Members of the Canadian Forces Primary Reserve took part in ground exercises in conjunction with Canadian Rangers. Prime Minister Stephen Harper traveled to the Arctic to observe the exercise. Unlike previous exercises, foreign services participated.

=== Participating forces ===
The Royal Danish Navy sent HDMS Vædderen and HDMS Knud Rasmussen. Vædderen is a frigate-sized Thetis-class ocean patrol vessel, launched in 1996. Knud Rasmussen was commissioned in 2008, the lead ship of a class specifically designed to patrol Baffin Bay.

The United States sent USS Porter and USCGC Alder. USS Porter is a United States Navy guided missile destroyer commissioned in 1999. USCGC Alder is a United States Coast Guard buoy tender homeported in Duluth, Minnesota, on the Great Lakes.

Canada sent HMCS Montréal, HMCS Goose Bay, HMCS Glace Bay, and CCGS Henry Larsen. Montréal is a Halifax-class frigate, commissioned in 1993. Goose Bay and Glace Bay are Kingston-class coastal defence vessels, commissioned in 1996 and 1998. Henry Larsen was the only icebreaker among the vessels.

=== Commentary ===
The Russian newspaper Pravda described the exercise as "saber rattling".

== 2011 ==
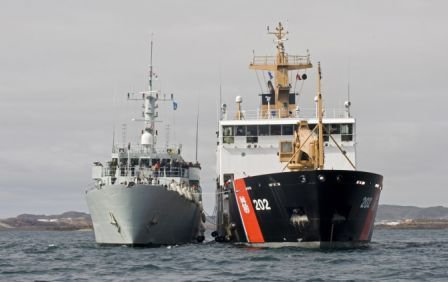
HMCS Summerside and USCGC Willow during Operation Nanook 2011

Operation Nanook 2011 was a military training exercise held in Canada's Arctic in August 2011. It was the fifth such annual exercise. Vessels from the United States Navy, United States Coast Guard and the Royal Danish Navy participated in the exercise.

Two scenarios in the exercise had military and civilian personnel simulate reacting to air and maritime emergencies. The air disaster scenario was to be handling a mid-air collision at Resolute Bay, and the attendant air crash investigation. While the exercise was being conducted, a commercial airplane (First Air Flight 6560) crashed while approaching Resolute Bay Airport, a short distance away from where the exercise was being held. The military personnel involved in the exercise assisted in rescue and recovery operations.

== 2012 ==
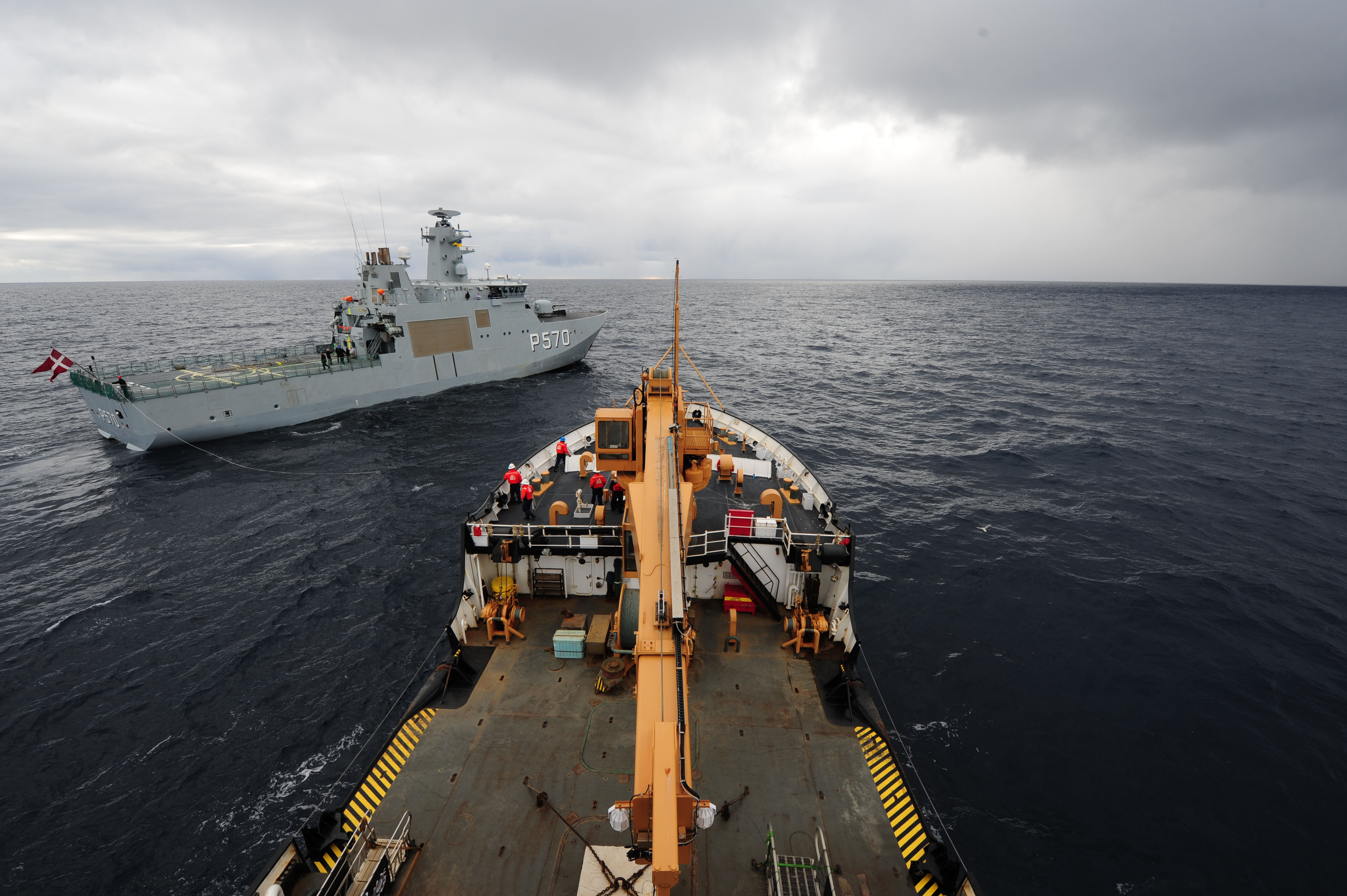
HDMS Knud Rasmussen and USCGC Juniper, during Operation Nanook 2012

Operation Nanook 2012 was a military training exercise held in Canada's Arctic in August 2012. It was the sixth annual exercise. Vessels from the United States Navy, United States Coast Guard and the Royal Danish Navy participated in the exercise.

One scenario simulated intercepting a "vessel of interest" in Baffin Bay. Another scenario had Canadian Armed Forces simulate being dispatched to a northern community, Tsiigehtchic, to assist the Royal Canadian Mounted Police with a "security event".

== 2014 ==
Operation Nanook 2014 was the eighth annual Arctic joint training exercise run by the Canadian Armed Forces and the Canadian Coast Guard.

Royal Danish Navy and the United States Navy vessels participated. The Canadian Rangers also participated. Overall approximately 1,000 people took part in the exercise, including local officials.

The training involved several scenarios, including sending boarding parties to an uncooperative vessel, and the simulation of rescuing the complement of a grounded cruise ship.

== 2016 ==
Operation Nanook 2016 was the tenth annual Arctic joint training exercise run by the Canadian Armed Forces and the Canadian Coast Guard.

Most previous iterations of Operation Nanook took place mainly in the Canadian Arctic Archipelago, while this one's events were set farther west, around Rankin Inlet, Nunavut, and Whitehorse, Yukon.

HMCS Moncton visited Churchill, Manitoba, North America's only deepwater port on the Arctic Ocean connected to the North American railway grid.

Mieke Coppes noted that Prime Minister Justin Trudeau was on an official visit overseas during the 2016 Operation Nanook, while previous Prime Minister Stephen Harper had attended all previous operations. Coppes pointed out that the cruise ship Crystal Serenity was transitting the Northwest Passage with a thousand tourists, asserting this sign of global warming should put a greater priority on the exercises.

== 2017 ==
Operation Nanook 2017 took place from 12 to 27 August 2017. The training exercise took place in parts of Labrador and Nunavut and incorporated more than 720 military and civilian personnel. The Nunavut exercise focused on sealift disaster preparation and simulated the destruction of a barge carrying supplies to the Rankin Inlet community. Canadian Rangers and military personnel from 38 Canadian Brigade Group based in Winnipeg, Manitoba, participated in the Nunavut operation, along with civilians from several government departments. The Labrador operation, based out of Goose Bay, Labrador, focused on northern defence and security. It was the first time Labrador hosted Operation Nanook. The beginning of the Labrador operation was delayed a couple of days due to inclement weather and a damaged helicopter.

The Royal Canadian Navy deployed the Halifax-class frigate Montréal and the Kingston-class coastal defence vessels Kingston and Goose Bay. The Royal Canadian Air Force dedicated three CC-138 Twin Otter aircraft, three CH-146 Griffon helicopters and two CH-147 Chinook helicopters, as well as a CC-130 Hercules and CC-177 Globemaster cargo aircraft to the entire operation.

== 2018 ==
Operation Nanook 2018 took place from 12 August to 4 September 2018.

== 2020 ==
Operation Nanook 2020 took place from July to August 2020. It was scaled down due to the COVID-19 pandemic, and resulted in a ban on port visits. The emphasis of that year's exercise was naval readiness, focusing on ship tracking and naval gunnery. Participating ships included, USS Thomas Hudner, USCGC Tahoma, HMCS Ville de Québec, HMCS Glace Bay, MV Asterix, HDMS Triton, and the French patrol ship Fulmar.

== 2021 ==
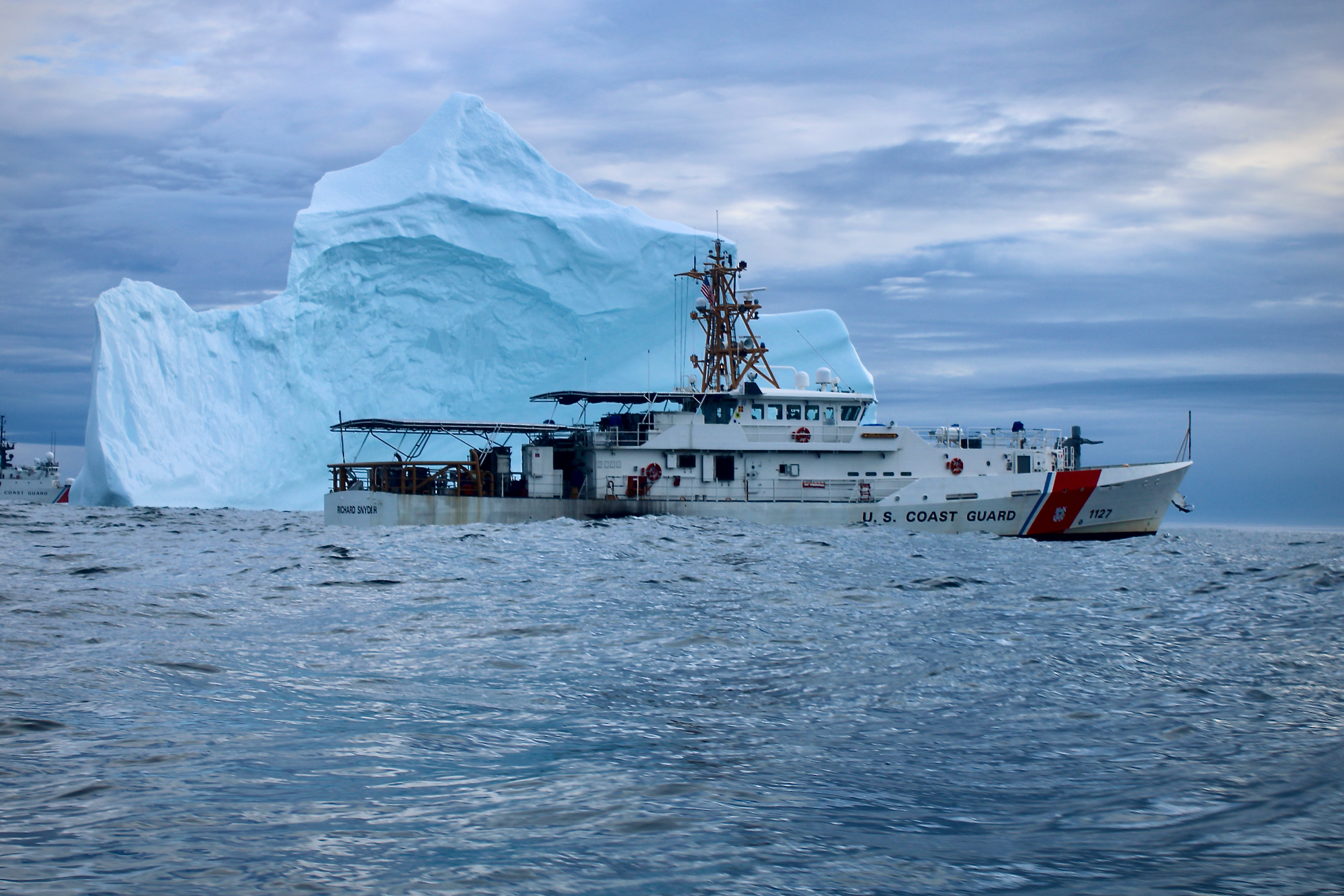
USCGC Richard Snyder navigating the Davis Strait as part of Operation Nanook 2021

Due to the ongoing COVID-19 pandemic, major changes were made to Operation Nanook for 2021. The training was split into two groups, with ground operations moved from the High Arctic/Nunavut to near Yellowknife, Northwest Territories, in March and a second phase to take place in the late spring/early summer months. The operation required that all participants self-isolate in various regions including Nova Scotia, Newfoundland and Labrador, and Yellowknife, and no international participation was allowed. Land forces were transported to their training sites by CH-147F Chinook helicopters.

== 2022 ==
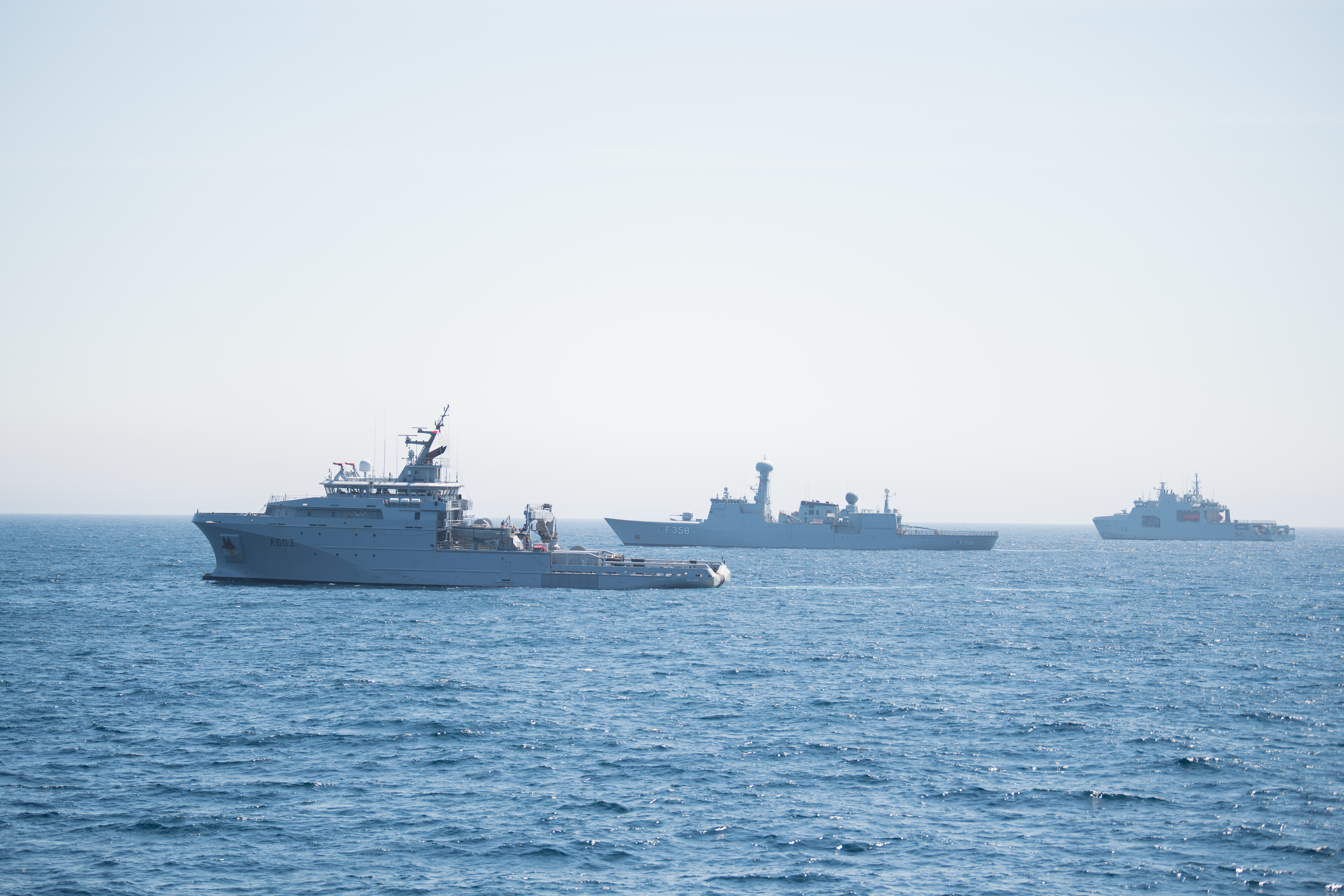
Rhône, HDMS Triton, and HMCS Margaret Brooke during Operation Nanook 2022

For Operation Nanook 2022, the Royal Canadian Navy deployed three ships to the Arctic, HMCS Harry DeWolf, Goose Bay and Margaret Brooke. Ships from the United States, French and Danish navies also took part. Lasting two months, the operation included scientific trials and patrols of the Northwest Passage.

Japan held observer status in Operation Nanook from 2022.

== 2023 ==
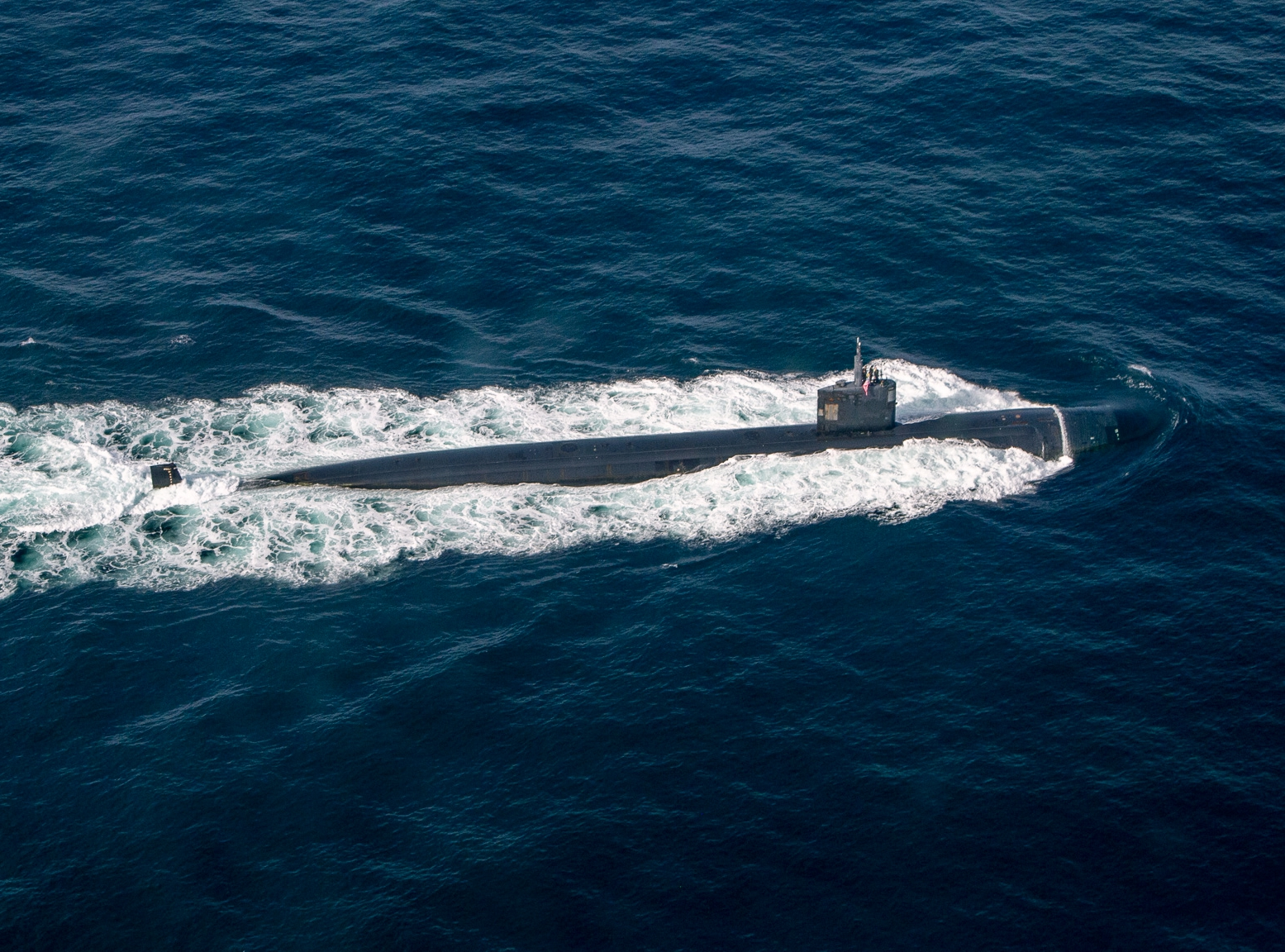
USS San Juan underway in the Atlantic Ocean during Operation Nanook 2023

Operation Nanook's primary land component in 2023, "Nanook-Nunakput," took place from 27 August to 9 September, overlapping somewhat in time with the main maritime component, "Nanook-Tuugaalik." Elements of the Royal Canadian Navy, Canadian Army, Royal Canadian Air Force, Canadian Special Operations Forces Command participated. Additionally, the United States Navy sent USS Oscar Austin and VP-10 and VP-45 maritime patrol squadrons, as well as unmanned underwater vehicles and the Los Angeles-class submarine (USS San Juan) for the first time. Members of the United States special operations forces were embarked on Harry DeWolf along with their Canadian counterparts. Ships from the Canadian Coast Guard, United States Coast Guard, French Navy and Royal Danish Navy were also present.

Around 100 soldiers from the 2nd Canadian Division were deployed to Inuvik and Tuktoyaktuk in the Northwest Territories with support from 1st Canadian Ranger Patrol Group and the Royal Canadian Air Force contributed multiple aircraft, including a CP-140 Aurora, CC-138 Twin Otters and a CH-147 Chinook to support multiple portions of the operation. The aim of the exercise was to demonstrate Canada's commitment to Arctic security and strengthening the Canadian Armed Forces' contribution to Arctic defence.

== 2024 ==
The summer portion of Operation Nanook 2024 included both a land and maritime component, "Nanook-Nunakput" and "Nanook-Tuugaalik," occurring from 15 August to 15 September and 12 to 22 August, respectively. The Canadian contingent included members of the Royal Canadian Mounted Police, Canadian Coast Guard, Royal Canadian Air Force, Canadian Special Operations Forces Command, Canadian Army, particularly 1st Canadian Ranger Patrol Group, and Harry DeWolf-class offshore patrol vessels Margaret Brooke and Harry DeWolf of the Royal Canadian Navy, among others. It was joined by United States Navy destroyer USS Delbert D. Black, United States Coast Guard cutter Northland and Royal Danish Navy offshore patrol vessel HDMS Lauge Koch. The commander of Joint Task Force North, Brigadier General Dan Rivière, stated that he was trying to find ways to make Operation Nanook even more multinational than it already was.

During the exercise, participating forces were deployed to Cambridge Bay, Chesterfield Inlet and the Northwest Passage in Nunavut, completing tasks such as survival training, underwater dive searches, austere live fire ranges, as well as boarding, gunnery, passing, maritime interdiction and shiprider exchange. The budget for Operation Nanook-Nunakput totalled $5,088,850.

== 2025 ==
Marking the largest-ever iteration of Operation Nanook, participants consisted of more than 450 Canadian Armed Forces members, joined by 110 personnel from the United States, Belgium, United Kingdom, Finland, Sweden, Norway, and Denmark. The first of four components of the operation, NANOOK-NUNALIVUT, took place from 23 February to 9 March 2025, around Inuvik and the Mackenzie River Delta in the Northwest Territories, with intentions of strengthening Arctic sovereignty and interoperability with Canada's military allies. The name NUNALIVUT comes from Inuktut, and signifies "land that is ours."

== 2026 ==
During Prime Minister Mark Carney's visit to Japan as prime minister, it was reported that Japan is planning to join Operation Nanook as a participant after holding observer status for many years.
