= 1st Canadian Ranger Patrol Group =

Patrol group of the Canadian Rangers

The 1st Canadian Ranger Patrol Group (1 CRPG) is a patrol group of the Canadian Rangers.

1 CRPG has provided a visible military presence in Canada’s Arctic and sub-Arctic communities for 79 years and continue to serve as the military's "eyes, ears and voice" in the North. 1 CRPG's motto vigilans (Latin for 'the watchers'), reflects how the Rangers continue to guard their local areas and provide support to the Canadian Armed Forces during domestic operations across the North.

== History ==
The 1st Canadian Ranger Patrol Group (1 CRPG) traces its origin to the Pacific Coast Militia Rangers (PCMR), which formed as a coast watching unit in 1942. The PCMR stood down at the end of the Second World War.

After the war, senior defence officials decided to resurrect the Rangers in order to provide a scouting, guide and reconnaissance capability in Canada's sparsely settled northern, coastal and isolated areas. In times of war, they were also expected to participate in the fight as "guerrilla bands" and to assist the RCMP in the discovery and apprehension of "enemy agents". Accordingly, the Canadian Rangers were officially formed as a Corps of the Reserve Militia by an Order-in-Council in 1947. Army Headquarters authorized the first two Ranger companies on September 4, 1947. The first Canadian Ranger (CR) patrol was stood up in Dawson on September 22, 1947. The second CR patrol was stood up in Whitehorse soon thereafter.

Members were generally outdoor workers who would perform military surveillance while going about their daily jobs. In the late 1940s and early 1950s rifles were issued to reliable individuals in communities in the High Arctic along with instructions to report any unusual activity in their areas. By the late 1950s Ranger Platoons and Companies had been established throughout the North.

Over the years, there have been several organizational accommodations to decentralize command and control of the Rangers. This culminated in November 1997 with the signing of a Ministerial Organizational Order to create five distinct and individual Canadian Ranger Patrol Groups. The 1st Canadian Ranger Patrol Group (1 CRPG), established on 2 April 1998, consists of Rangers from Nunavut, the Northwest Territories (NWT), Yukon Territory and Atlin, British Columbia, with the CRPG headquarters in Yellowknife, NWT.

== Unit structure ==
1 CRPG is a unique army unit due to its large area of responsibility (AOR), diversity, culture, size (it is the largest military unit in the CAF), mandate, and command relationships. It is under direct command (OPCOM) of 3rd Canadian Division but Joint Task Force North retains operational control (OPCON) for force employment. 1 CRPG also receives policy direction from the Canadian Ranger National Authority (CRNA), and the National Cadet and Junior Canadian Ranger Support Group. 1 CRPG's primary mission is to conduct surveillance and sovereignty patrols; nation-building activities; conduct ground search and rescue; support other CAF assets and other government departments (OGDs); and deliver a successful Junior Canadian Ranger (JCR) program throughout the North.

1 CRPG headquarters has a manning strength of over 100 Regular and Reserve Force personnel, who are responsible for overseeing 61 Ranger patrols and 44 JCR patrols. Of the headquarters staff, approximately 20 are ranger instructors (RI). The role of the RI is to train, advise, assist, accompany and administer ranger patrols during mentored activities within their community and on large-scale operations such as Operation Nanook. The RI also acts as each ranger patrol's first link in the chain-of-command. The majority of RIs come from the combat arms and deploy on a monthly basis for up to 10 days at a time. The remaining HQ staff deploy less frequently, but have a very demanding workload throughout the year.

Canadian Ranger patrols across the north are identified by the name of their community. There are 25 patrols in Nunavut Territory, 23 patrols in the Northwest Territories, 12 in the Yukon Territory, and one in Atlin, British Columbia. 1 CRPG's combined area of responsibility encompasses approximately four million square kilometers (40 per cent) of Canada's land mass, 75 per cent of its coastal regions. It runs 8,000 kilometres (5,000 mi) east to west. 1 CRPG members carry out over 200 exercises and operations a year.

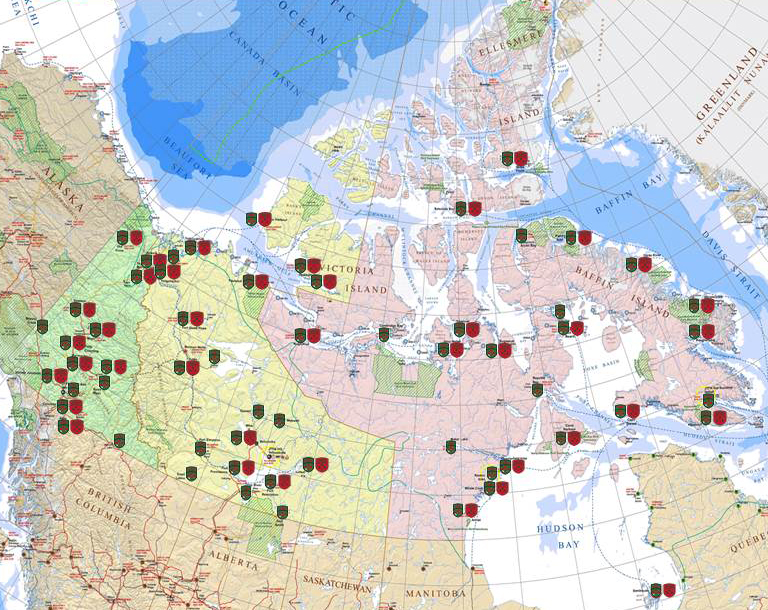
1 Canadian Ranger Patrol Group – Canadian Ranger and Junior Canadian Ranger patrols across the North.

== Activities ==
Most local Ranger patrols in the NWT and Nunavut can be reached only by air. Commercial airlines, charter or Twin Otter aircraft from 440 Transport Squadron facilitate the travel of RIs to these isolated patrols. The exceptions to this are the NWT patrols of Behchokǫ̀, Fort Simpson, Fort Resolution, and Fort Smith. These communities can be reached by road year-round. During the winter season, travel to the villages of Whatì, Gamèti, Wekweeti and Trout Lake can be accomplished by ice road. All the patrols in the Yukon Territory, less the community of Old Crow, can be reached by an all-weather road system.

Each Canadian Ranger patrol reflects the demographics of their communities and range in size from 12 to 60 Rangers. The majority of the Canadian Rangers are Aboriginal. Some speak only an indigenous language.

Enrolment in the Canadian Rangers is open to both men and women over the age of 18. Leadership within the patrol consists of a Ranger sergeant, assisted by a Ranger master corporal, and several corporals depending on the patrol size. Unlike the rest of the CAF, local leadership positions are elected by the Rangers in the patrol, based on the leadership candidates' traditional knowledge of living on the land and the respect that the community has for them.

Upon enrolment, Rangers are issued with their uniform, which consists of a red sweatshirt with the Ranger crest, red baseball cap, camouflage pants, and boots. Canadian Rangers are also provided up to 100 rounds of ammunition per Ranger per year.

The Junior Canadian Rangers, the largest youth program in the North, are an integral part of the Ranger family. In 1 CRPG, there are over 1600 Junior Rangers in 41 communities co-located with Ranger patrols. The JCR program is open to all youth ages 12 to 18 years old and promotes traditional cultures and lifestyles, in remote and isolated communities of the North. JCRs make a valuable contribution to their communities and become active, responsible citizens.

== Training and Employment ==
Canadian Rangers are considered trained upon enrolment but may elect to participate in a Basic Military Indoctrination course. In all territories, the objective is for all patrols to conduct an annual refresher training patrol, consisting of up to 10 days classroom and training on the land.

Ranger training is based on the specific level of training and experience of each patrol and is broken down into individual, collective or leadership training. Key subjects that can be taught include: a. first aid; b. in-service weapons; c. guiding or scouting; d. navigation using map and compass, as well as GPS; e. traditional and survival skills; f. operations in support of Regular Force units; g. basic military drill; h surveillance; i. search and rescue; j. patrolling; and k. patrol leadership and administration.

The Ranger employment model also takes advantage of Northerners' special skills. During Operation Nanook, the CAF relies on their detailed knowledge of the local landscape and their ability to navigate and to survive on the land in harsh sub-Arctic and Arctic environments.

Because the CAF is responsible for responding to any kind of threat in Canada's north, it undertakes three sovereignty exercises per year. These exercises allow the military to maintain the skills required to operate in weather extremes at great distances from support bases. Rangers are core participants in each of these exercises.

Ranger Patrols are additionally tasked with patrols in the area around their communities, to include ground search and rescue and facilities checks at North Warning System sites.

== Bibliography ==
- Lackenbauer, P. Whitney. (2013). The Canadian Rangers: A Living History. Vancouver: UBC Press.
- Lackenbauer, P. Whitney. (2015). Vigilans: The 1st Canadian Ranger Patrol Group. Yellowknife: 1 CRPG.
- Lackenbauer, P. Whitney. (2013). Canada's Rangers: Selected Stories, 1942-2012. Kingston: Canadian Defence Academy Press.
- Lackenbauer, P. Whitney. (2007). "Guerrillas in Our Midst: The Pacific Coast Militia Rangers, 1942-45." BC Studies no. 155. Pages 95–131.
- Lackenbauer, P. Whitney. (2007). "Teaching Canada's Indigenous Sovereignty Soldiers ... and Vice Versa: 'Lessons Learned' from Ranger Instructors." Canadian Army Journal vol. 10, no. 2. Pages 66–81.
- Lackenbauer, P. Whitney. (2006). "The Canadian Rangers: A Postmodern Militia That Works." Canadian Military Journal vol. 6, no. 4. Pages 49–60.
- Lackenbauer, P. Whitney. (2007). "Canada's Northern Defenders: Aboriginal Peoples in the Canadian Rangers, 1947-2005," in Aboriginal Peoples and the Canadian Military: Historical Perspectives ed. P. Whitney Lackenbauer and Craig Mantle. Kingston: CDA Press. Pages 171–208.
- Lackenbauer, P. Whitney. (2013). "Sentinels of Sovereignty: How the Canadian Rangers came to be the shadow army of the North," Canada's History (April/May 2013): 48–50.
- Lackenbauer, P. Whitney. (2013). If It Ain't Broke, Don't Break It: Expanding and Enhancing the Canadian Rangers. Working Papers on Arctic Security No. 6. Toronto: Walter and Duncan Gordon Foundation and ArcticNet Arctic Security Projects, March 2013. 23 pp.
- Lackenbauer, P. Whitney. (2012). "The Canadian Rangers: Supporting Canadian Sovereignty, Security, and Stewardship since 1947," Above and Beyond: Canada's Arctic Journal (September/October 2012): 31–36.
