= HMCS Athabaskan (DDG 282) =

Former destroyer of the Royal Canadian Navy

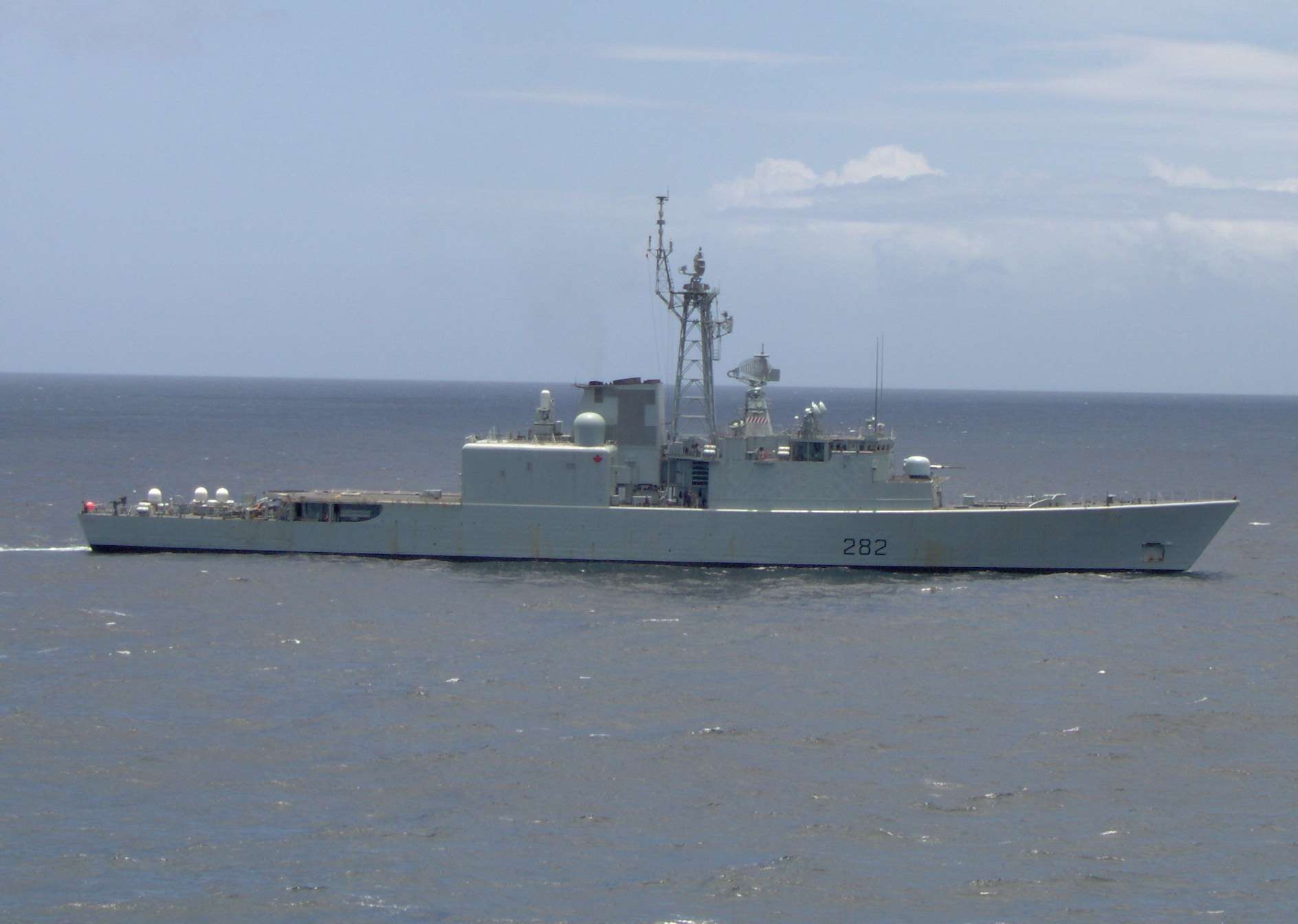

History

Canada
- Name: Athabaskan
- Namesake: Athabaskan
- Builder: Davie Shipbuilding, Lauzon
- Laid down: 1 June 1969
- Launched: 27 November 1970
- Commissioned: 30 September 1972
- Decommissioned: 10 March 2017
- Refit: 4 June 1994 (TRUMP)
- Home port: CFB Halifax
- Identification: MMSI number: 316136000; Callsign: CYWM
- Motto: We Fight as One
- Fate: Scrapped 2018
- Notes: Colours:White and Scarlet
- Badge: Blazon On a field argent, a North American Indian clad in buckskin breeches, leggings and beaded moccasins, but bare to the waist except for a necklace of bear's claws and blue shells, and ear ornaments of the last. The Indian wears the full-feathered headdress and is mounted bareback upon an Indian pony being halted from the trot. The Indian holds a red bow and arrow in the "ready" position, the latter pointing down.

General characteristics
- Class & type: Iroquois-class destroyer
- Displacement: 5100 t
- Length: 129.8 m (425.9 ft)
- Beam: 15.2 m (49.9 ft)
- Draught: 4.7 m (15.4 ft)
- Propulsion: COGOG – 2 shaft; 2 × Allison 570-KF cruise gas turbines (5.6 MW); 2 × Pratt & Whitney FT4A-2 boost gas turbines (37 MW)
- Speed: 29 kn (53.7 km/h)
- Range: 4,500 nmi (8,334.0 km)
- Complement: 280
- Sensors & processing systems: Signaal AN/SPQ 501 DA-08 radar; Signaal LW-08 AN/SPQ 502 radar; SQS-510 hull sonar; SQS-510 VDS sonar
- Armament: 29 × VLS, Standard SM-2MR Block IIIA SAMs; 1 × 76 mm/62 OTO Melara; 6 × 12.75 in tubes firing Mark-46 Mod 5 torpedoes; 1 × Phalanx CIWS (Block 1B); 6 × M2 Browning machine guns
- Aircraft carried: 2 × CH-124 Sea King helicopters
- Aviation facilities: hangar and flight deck

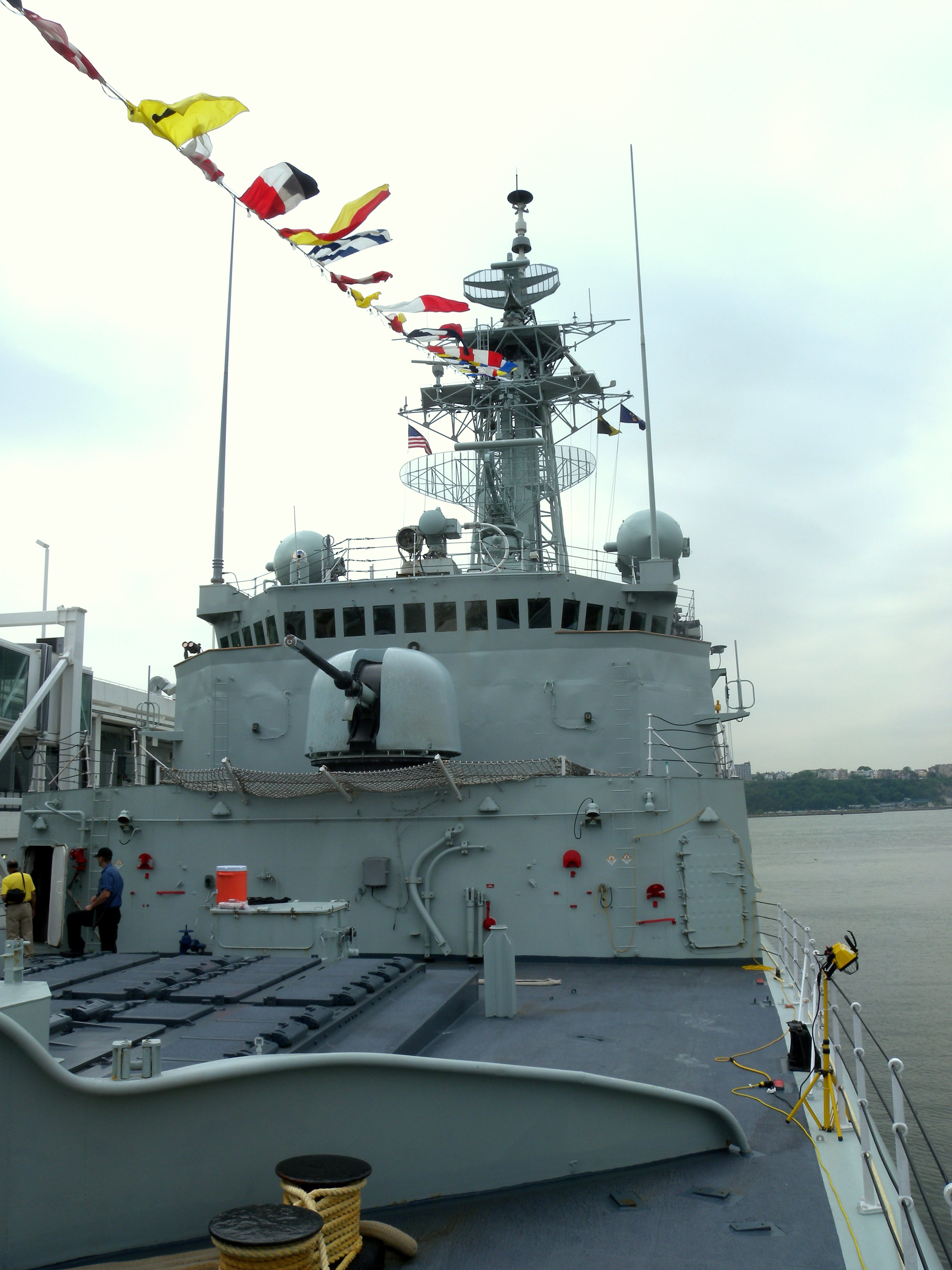
Foredeck, gun and bridge

HMCS Athabaskan was an Iroquois-class destroyer that served in the Royal Canadian Navy from 1972 until 2017. Athabaskan was the third ship of her class which was sometimes referred to as the Tribal class or simply as the 280 class. She was the third vessel to be named Athabaskan.

Athabaskan was laid down on 1 June 1969 at Davie Shipbuilding, Lauzon and was launched on 27 November 1970. She was officially commissioned on 30 September 1972 and carries the hull classification symbol 282.

Athabaskan completed a refit known as the Tribal Update and Modernization Project (TRUMP) on 4 June 1994. At this time her classification changed from Destroyer Helicopter (DDH) to Destroyer Guided Missile (DDG). She was assigned to Maritime Forces Atlantic (MARLANT) homeported at CFB Halifax.

== Service ==
Athabaskan served on MARLANT missions protecting Canada's sovereignty in the Atlantic Ocean and enforcing Canadian laws in its territorial sea and Exclusive Economic Zone. She was also deployed on missions throughout the Atlantic and to the Indian Ocean; specifically, the Persian Gulf and Arabian Sea after Iraq occupied Kuwait.

=== NATO missions in Atlantic Ocean ===
Athabaskan participated in several NATO missions, patrolling the Atlantic Ocean as part of Standing Naval Force Atlantic (STANAVFORLANT) and its successor Standing NATO Response Force Maritime Group 1 (SNMG1). On 2–3 August 1999 STANAVFORLANT force undertook exercises in the Baltic Sea, where Polish Mil Mi-14 helicopter landed upon Athabaskan.

=== Iraq–Kuwait war in Persian Gulf ===
In August 1990, Athabaskan was hurriedly refitted with several advanced weapons and took part in Operation Friction and in Operation Desert Shield. The weapons included a close-in weapon system (CIWS). Athabaskan was appointed flagship of the Canadian Naval Task Group, which included the destroyer Terra Nova and supply ship Protecteur. The task group served in the central Persian Gulf, with other coalition naval forces, through the fall of 1990.

After Operation Desert Storm began in January 1991, the task group undertook escort duties for hospital ships and other vulnerable naval vessels of the coalition. The Ticonderoga-class cruiser USS Princeton detonated two Iraqi bottom-moored influence mines (MANTAs) at the north end of the Persian Gulf and was seriously damaged. Athabaskan was not assigned to the area, but the commanding officer of Princeton specifically requested her assistance. Unlike most ships of her size, Athabaskan could simultaneously operate two large CH-124 Sea King helicopters, which could search out mines for long periods. Athabaskan and her helicopters helped both ships avoid mines until the minesweeper USS Adroit escorted them out of the minefield. As a gesture of solidarity, Athabaskan winched over several cases of beer for the crew of Princeton, since United States Navy vessels were dry (officially without alcoholic beverages). Athabaskan returned to her task group and remained on station in the Persian Gulf until after the war ended. After the hostilities were complete she was relieved by her sister ship Huron. The professionalism of Athabaskan earned praise from Princeton's commanding officer, Captain Edward Hontz.

=== Disaster relief in U.S. ===
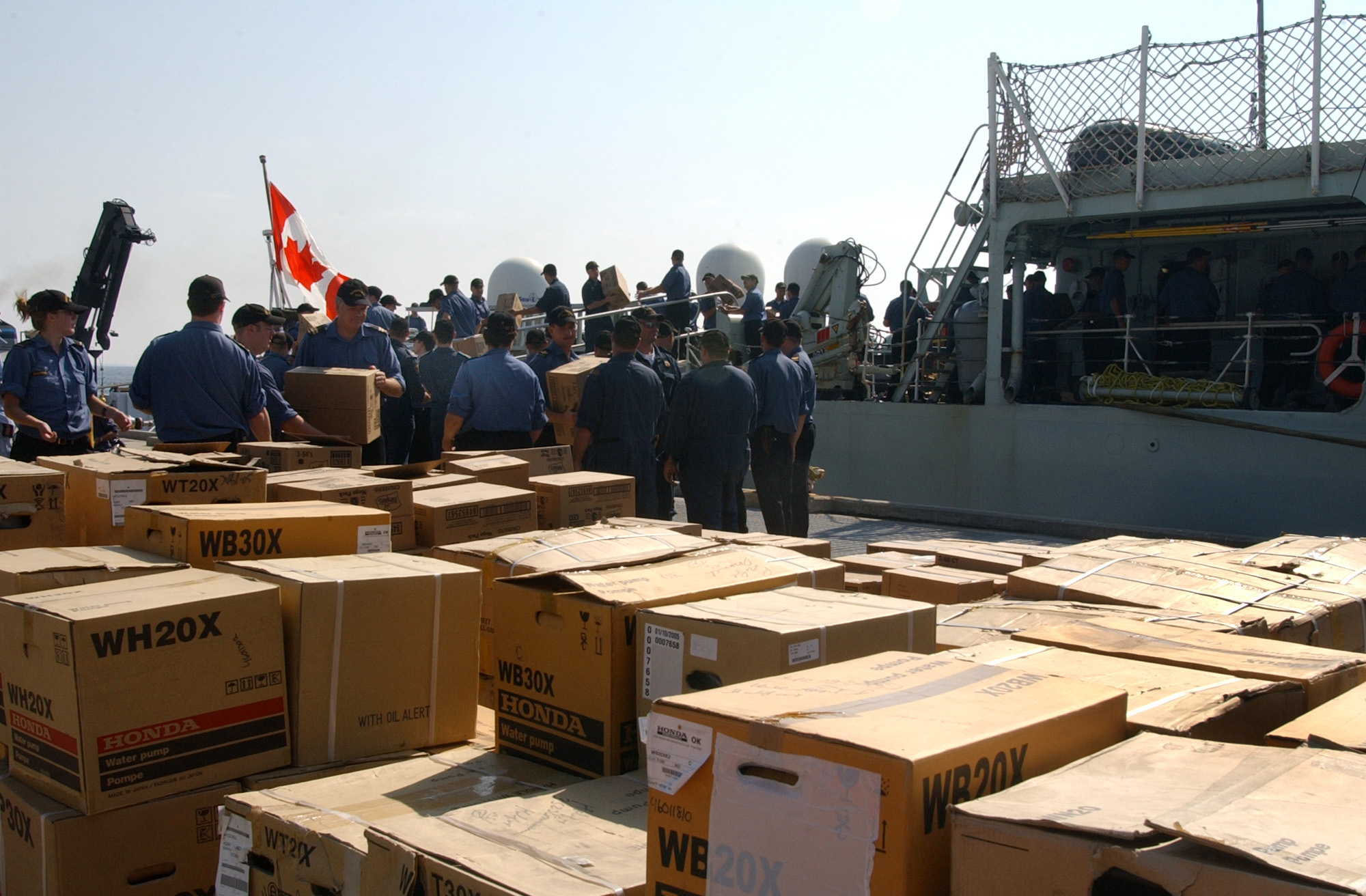
Sailors from HMCS Athabaskan unload supplies on a pier on board Naval Air Station Pensacola, Florida as part of Hurricane Katrina disaster relief efforts

On 2 September 2005, Athabaskan was one of several MARLANT vessels and a Canadian Coast Guard ship that were deployed to Mississippi and Louisiana to assist disaster relief efforts after Hurricane Katrina. This was part of the larger Canadian response to Hurricane Katrina.

=== Disaster relief in Haiti ===
On 14 January 2010, as part of Operation Hestia, following rapid outfitting Athabaskan and Halifax were deployed to Haiti to assist with disaster relief efforts after a 7.0 magnitude earthquake. This was as part of the larger multi-pronged Canadian Disaster Assistance Response Team (DART). The crew of Athabaskan primarily concentrated relief efforts in the city of Léogâne where the crew assisted in triage efforts with the Canadian Medical Assistance Team, cleared rubble within Notre Dame Asylum, built three orphanages and lent aid to five others. Léogâne is a city of 135,000 that was slow to receive relief efforts and was almost completely destroyed by the earthquake. There were an estimated 20,000–30,000 casualties in the city.

=== NATO exercises ===
After experiencing a series of engine failures and maintenance issues, the ship underwent repairs. The ship was repaired and set sail on 8 September 2015, NATO naval exercises Joint Warrior and Trident Venture with Windsor, Halifax, Montréal, Goose Bay and Summerside. However, the starboard cruise engine failed while crossing the Atlantic. The ship sailed to the United Kingdom where she was joined by a mobile repair team which replaced the engine.

In January 2016, Athabaskan was outfitted with one of the Canadian Navy's first AN/USC-69(V3) antennas under the Short-Term Satellite Communications Upgrade (STSCU) Project. The installation was meant to increase the ship's bandwidth prior to sailing on joint exercises with American forces.

In September 2016 Athabaskan was among the Canadian warships deployed to the NATO naval training exercise Cutlass Fury off the east coast of North America.

=== Fate ===
In September 2016, the RCN announced that Athabaskan would be paid off in early 2017, leaving the navy without a platform capable of long-range air defence, at least until the introduction of the planned Canadian Surface Combatant. After returning from her last port visit in Bermuda, the ship conducted two days sails for families and past crew members, on 7 and 8 March 2017, respectively. The vessel conducted a final sail past of Halifax Harbour on 10 March 2017, upon which she was paid off and the ship's company reassigned to other units. In February 2018 Marine Recycling Corporation secured a CA$5.7-million contract to dismantle Athabaskan at its facility at Sydney, Nova Scotia. She left Halifax on 29 March 2018 for Sydney, Nova Scotia to be scrapped.

== Engine ==
In 2009, a man in Nova Scotia discovered one of Athabaskan's pre-1994 refit engines in a shipping container he had been using as a bridge on his property. The man had bought the container for $400 believing it was empty. The engine was originally valued at $2 million.

== Timeline ==
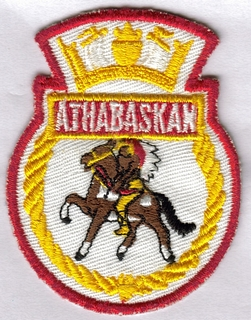
Athabaskan badge

- 1 June 1969: Laid down.
- 27 November 1970: Launched Lauzon, QC.
- 30 September 1972: Commissioned.
- 26 November 1981: Destroyer HMCS Athabaskan's Sea King helicopter removed 44 people from oil rig Rowan Juneau off Sable Island in 60 knot winds and sea state 5 conditions.
- 24 August 1990: Refitted for Operation Friction, part of Operation Desert Shield.
- Late 1990: Sent to Persian Gulf.
- January 1991: Escort duties.
- 18 February 1991: Within three hours and ten nautical miles (19 km), USS Tripoli and Princeton struck mines while conducting operations in the northern Persian Gulf. Ships lead out of danger by HMCS Athabaskan.
- April 1991: Returns to Halifax for refit.
- 15 October 1991: Destroyer HMCS Athabaskan arrived Sorel PQ for TRUMP modernization.
- 4 June 1994: Destroyer HMCS Athabaskan completed TRUMP refit Marine Industries Ltd Sorel, QC.
- 8 October 1995: Destroyer HMCS Athabaskan departed Halifax for South American UNITAS exercises.
- 15 March 1999: Destroyer HMCS Athabaskan departed Halifax to Join STANAVFORLANT in Hamilton, Bermuda.
- 31 July 1999: Gdynia
- 9 March 2000: New Orleans.
- 24 June 2004: Boston.
- 28 June 2004: Halifax.
- 22 September 2004: Halifax.
- 8 November 2004: HMC ships Athabaskan, St John's, Halifax and Toronto, that formed part of Task Group 301.1, departed from their anchorages in Bedford Basin to rendezvous with the remainder of the Task Group. The ships were to participate in Combat Readiness Operations (CRO), one of the largest exercises led by the Canadian Navy in the last decade and the largest grouping of Canadian ships since Operation Apollo.
- 19 November 2004: Norfolk.
- 2 March 2005: Nassau.
- 28 May 2005: New York (Fleet Week).
- 2 September 2005: Deployed to US Gulf Coast to assist disaster relief efforts after Hurricane Katrina.
- 11 September 2005: New Orleans.
- 12 September 2005: Pensacola.
- 22 September 2005: Norfolk.
- 11 January 2006: HMCS Athabaskan departed Halifax on a six-month deployment to join the Standing NATO Response Force Maritime Group One (SNMG1) in Kiel.
- 19 January 2006: Plymouth Sound.
- 23 January 2006: Kiel Canal (International Squadron). Flagship 25th.
- 5 February 2006: Off Denmark coast, Sea King trying to land crashes. No casualties or injuries.
- 19 February 2006: Valletta (International Squadron).
- 8 March 2006: Malaga (International Squadron).
- 17 March 2006: Den Helder (International Squadron).
- 13 April 2006: Antwerp (International Squadron).
- 20 April 2006: Devonport (International Squadron).
- 21 April 2006: Warships moored at Devonport Naval Base commemorate the 80th birthday of the Queen. Foreign ships from the Standing Naval Maritime Group One (flagship HMCS Athabaskan) are also taking part. This is a squadron of eight to ten destroyers and frigates from across NATO countries that patrols mainly in the eastern Atlantic conducting joint training exercises. The group are currently taking part in Flag Officer Sea Training at Devonport.
- 28 April 2006: Lisbon (International Squadron).
- 16 May 2006: Rota (International Squadron).
- 6 June 2006: Las Palmas de Gran Canaria (International Squadron).
- 28 June 2006: Cape Verde (International Squadron).
- 10 July 2006: Halifax.
- 20 November 2006: Morehead City.
- 11 April 2008: Boston.
- Mid 2008: in Halifax for five weeks in summer.
- Late June 2008: Leaves Halifax Harbour for a week of trials and drills.
- 27 July 2008: Arrives in St. John's NL for 5 days of rest and festivities, including Canada Day.
- 27 October 2008: First successful sea trials with new laser-gyro INS.
- 3 March 2009: In ceremony aboard Athabaskan in Bermuda, Commodore Norman takes over Atlantic Fleet.
- 20 May 2009: New York (Fleet Week).
- 20 August 2009: Cdr P. Crain takes command of HMCS Athabaskan.
- 28 September 2009: Exercise Joint Warrior off the coast of Scotland. Ship proceeds through Scapa Flow to pay respect to HMS Royal Oak. Glasgow and Edinburgh port visits.
- 13 January 2010: Prepares to deploy to Haiti in Canadian relief for an earthquake that had impacted on 12 January.
- 14 January 2010: Sails from CFB Halifax en route to Haiti along with HMCS Halifax for humanitarian Operation HESTIA.
- 17 March 2010: Ship returns to Halifax.
- 6 May 2010: Lt. Governor's Cruise to Sydney, NS to Celebrate Canadian Navy Centennial.
- 26 May 2010: New York (Fleet Week).
- 29 June 2010: HMCS Athabaskan is command ship for Queen Elizabeth II's review of International Fleet in Halifax Harbour as part of Canadian Navy Centennial celebrations.
- 1 November 2010: Task Group Exercise 2–10, Boston, Fort Lauderdale, Norfolk port visits.
- 17 December 2010: Cdr Micheal Davie takes command of HMCS Athabaskan.
- 9 April 2012: Docked outside Seaway Marine and Industrial Limited, formerly known as the Port Weller Dry Docks in the Welland Canal in St. Catharines, Ontario.
- Late December 2012: When being towed from St. Catharines back to Halifax (15 Dec 2012), sustained hull damaged when ship broke loose near Scatarie off Cape Breton coast (28 Dec 2012); now tied down in North Sydney.
- June 2013: Restricted Readiness Inspections.
- 17 July 2013: Boston.
- 16 September 2013: Sea trials start.
- April 2014: Work Ups, port visit to Charleston, South Carolina.
- June–July 2014: Rendezvous Naval Québec, Air Workups/Ship Without Air Detachment (SWOAD) Training.
- August 2014: Task Group Exercise 2–14, including port visit to Mayport, Florida.
- September 2014: Baltimore, Star Spangled Spectacular celebration.
- September–October 2014: Caribbean deployment and maritime security operations, diplomatic visit to Veracruz, Mexico.
- November 2014: Short Work Period in Halifax.
- March 2015: Damaged during storm of sea state 9.
- July 2015: After experiencing a series of engine failures and maintenance issues, the ship remains alongside in Halifax undergoing repairs.
- May 2016: Ship enters New York Harbor to participate in Fleet Week.
- September 2016: Ship participates in Exercise Cutlass Fury as part of a NATO Task Group, off the coasts of Nova Scotia and Newfoundland.
- October–December 2016: Ship participates in Exercise SPARTAN WARRIOR, off the coast of Virginia, Florida and the Bahamas.
- February 2017: Ship participates in USN Task Group Exercise, Final Port Visit to Her First Port Visit Hamilton, Bermuda.
- 10 March 2017: Athabaskan is officially paid off and retired from active service.
