= HDMS Knud Rasmussen =

Danish patrol vessel

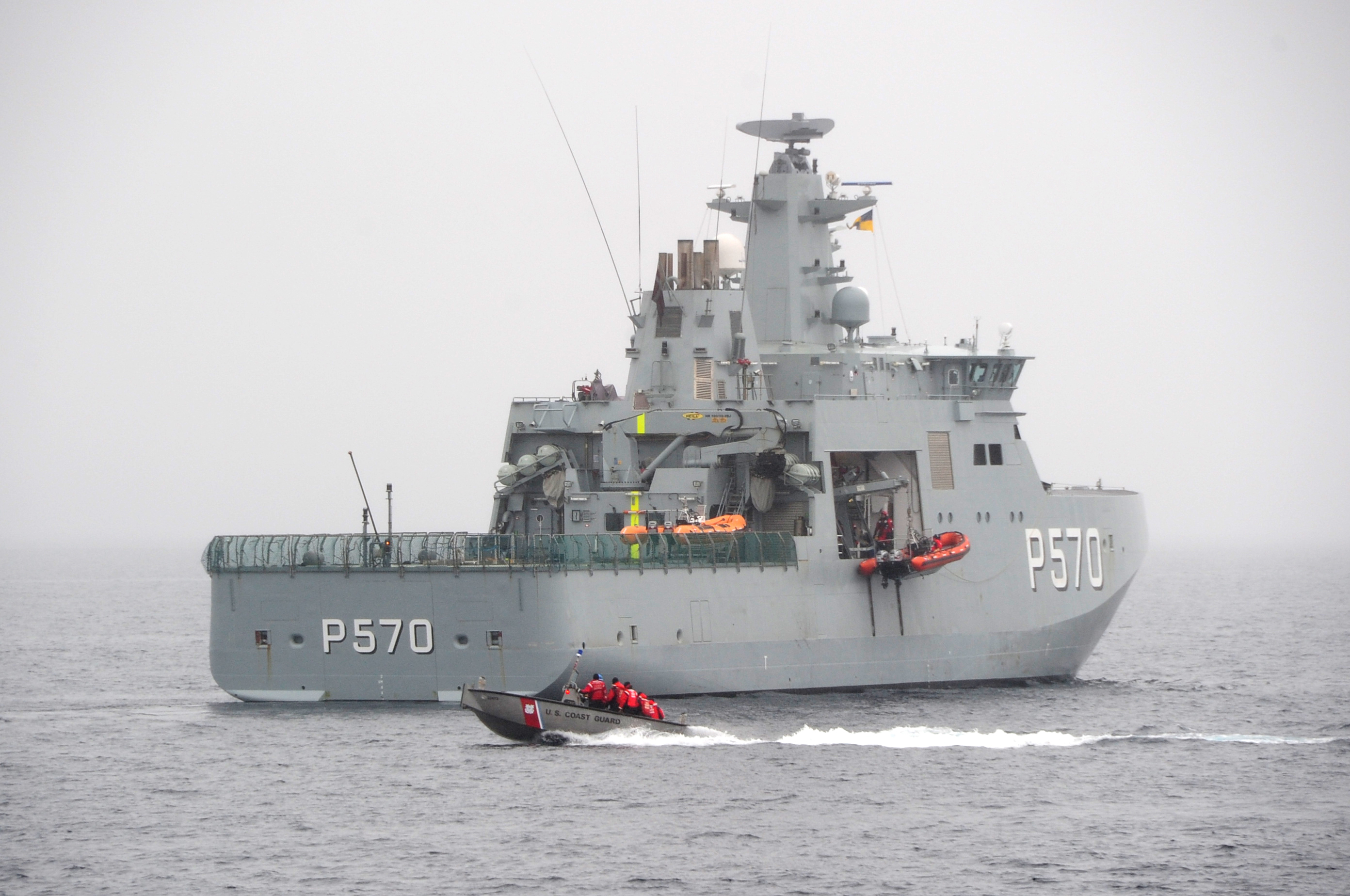
- Knud Rasmussen participates in Operation Nanook 2010.

History

Kingdom of Denmark
- Name: Knud Rasmussen
- Namesake: Knud Rasmussen
- Launched: 19 October 2006
- Identification: MMSI number: 220428000; Callsign: OVFG
- Status: In service

General characteristics
- Class & type: Knud Rasmussen-class patrol vessel
- Displacement: 1,720 long tons (1,748 t)
- Length: 61 m (200 ft 2 in)
- Beam: 14.6 m (47 ft 11 in)
- Draft: 4.9 m (16 ft 1 in)
- Propulsion: 2 × MAN B&W Diesel ALPHA 8L27/28 generating 2720 kW each
- Speed: Less than 17 knots (31 km/h; 20 mph)
- Range: 3,000 nautical miles (5,600 km)
- Boats & landing craft carried: 1 × SB90E for Search and rescue; 1 × 7m (60 HP) RHIB; 1 × 4.8m (45 HP) RHIB
- Complement: 18 + aircrew and transients (Accommodation for up to 43 in total)
- Sensors & processing systems: 1 × Terma Scanter 4100 surface and air search radar; 3 × Furuno navigation radars; SAAB CEROS 200 radar and optronic tracking system and CWI illumination radar
- Armament: 1 × 76 mm Gun Mk M/85 LvSa; 2 × 12.7 mm Heavy Machine Gun M/01 LvSa; RIM-162 Evolved Sea Sparrow Missile surface-to-air missiles (not fitted with); MU90 Impact ASW torpedo
- Aviation facilities: Aft helicopter deck, no hangar

HDMS Knud Rasmussen is a Royal Danish Navy patrol vessel. Knud Rasmussen and her sister ships normally operate in the waters around Greenland. HDMS Knud Rasmussen is capable of breaking through ice up to 80 cm thick.

Knud Rasmussen participated in Operation Nanook 2010, in August 2010, and 2014, in Baffin Bay and the Davis Strait, with Canadian and American vessels.

In September 2025, the Knud Rasmussen took part in the NATO Arctic Light exercise off Greenland.

== Sources ==
- Warship International Staff (2010). "New Danish Navy Patrol Ship". Warship International. XLVII (3): 194. ISSN 0043-0374.
