= HMCS Montréal (FFH 336) =

Royal Canadian Navy frigate

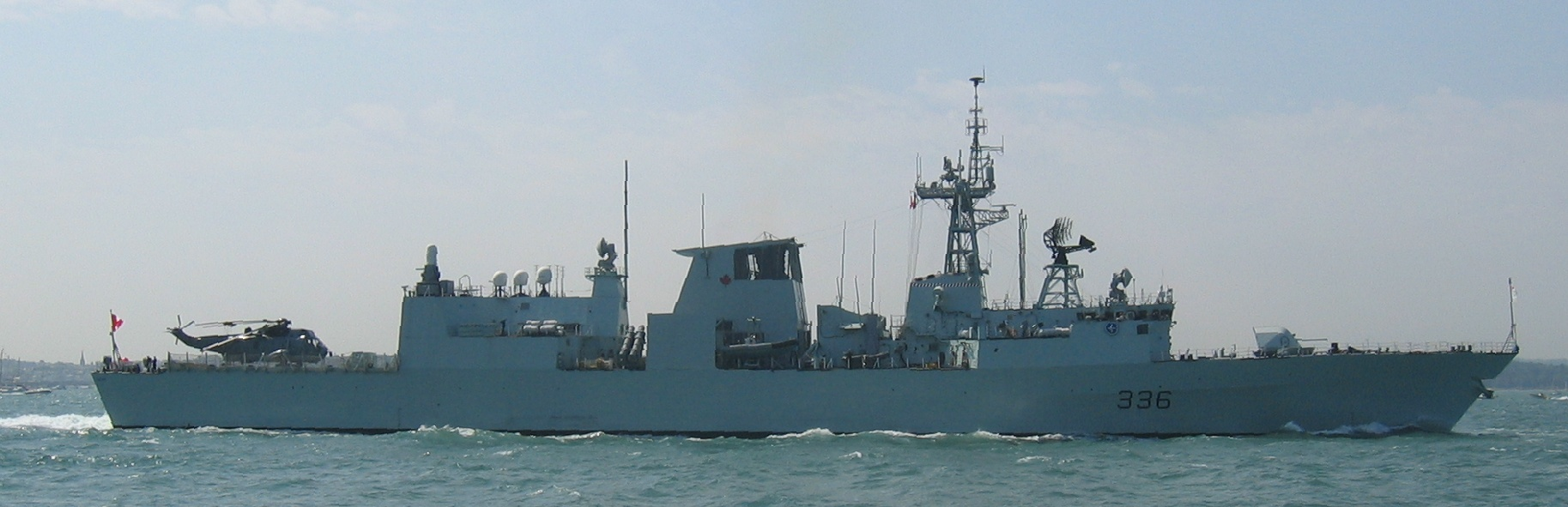
- HMCS Montréal

History

Canada
- Name: Montréal
- Namesake: Montréal, Quebec
- Builder: Saint John Shipbuilding Ltd., Saint John
- Laid down: 8 February 1991
- Launched: 28 February 1992
- Commissioned: 21 July 1994
- Refit: HCM/FELEX July 2012 – July 2013
- Home port: CFB Halifax
- Identification: MMSI number: 316129000; Callsign: CGAG; Pennant number: FFH 336
- Motto: Ton Bras Sait Porter L'Épée (We Stand On Guard For Thee)
- Honours and awards: Atlantic 1944–45, Arabian Sea 2002–03
- Status: in active service
- Badge: A coronet of fleur-de-lis and maple leaves superimposed upon a stylized mountain which borders a river.

General characteristics
- Class & type: Halifax-class frigate
- Displacement: 3,995 tonnes (light); 4,795 tonnes (operational); 5,032 tonnes (deep load)
- Length: 134.2 m (440 ft)
- Beam: 16.5 m (54 ft)
- Draught: 7.1 m (23 ft)
- Propulsion: 2 × LM2500 gas turbines; 1 × SEMT Pielstick diesel engine
- Speed: 30 knots (56 km/h; 35 mph)
- Range: 9,500 nmi (17,600 km; 10,900 mi)
- Complement: 255 (including air detachment)
- Armament: 24 × Honeywell Mk 46 torpedoes; 16 × Evolved Sea-Sparrow SAM; 8 × RGM-84 Harpoon SSM; 1 × 57 mm Bofors Mk3 gun; 1 × 20 mm Vulcan Phalanx CIWS; 6 × .50 caliber machine guns
- Aircraft carried: 1 × CH-148 Cyclone

HMCS Montréal is a Halifax-class frigate that has served in the Canadian Forces since 1993. Montréal is the seventh ship in her class which is based on the Canadian Patrol Frigate Project. She is the second vessel to carry the designation HMCS Montreal. She is assigned to Maritime Forces Atlantic (MARLANT) and is homeported at CFB Halifax. Montréal serves on MARLANT missions protecting Canada's sovereignty in the Atlantic and Arctic Oceans and enforcing Canadian laws in its territorial sea and Exclusive Economic Zone. The ship has also been deployed on missions throughout the Atlantic and to the Indian Ocean; specifically the Persian Gulf and Arabian Sea on anti-terrorism operations. The vessel has also participated in several NATO missions, patrolling the Atlantic Ocean as part of Standing Naval Force Atlantic (STANAVFORLANT) and its successor Standing NATO Response Force Maritime Group 1 (SNMG1). The vessel is designated as a Bilingual Language Unit in the Royal Canadian Navy.

== Description and design ==
The Halifax-class frigate design, emerging from the Canadian Patrol Frigate Project, was ordered by the Canadian Forces in 1977 as a replacement for the aging St. Laurent, Restigouche, Mackenzie, and Annapolis classes of destroyer escorts, which were all tasked with anti-submarine warfare. Montréal was ordered in December 1987 as part of the second batch of frigates. To reflect the changing long-term strategy of the Navy during the 1980s and 1990s, the Halifax-class frigates were designed as general purpose warships with particular focus on anti-submarine capabilities.

As built, the Halifax-class vessels displaced 4,750 long tons (4,830 t) and were 134.65 metres (441 ft 9 in) long overall and 124.49 metres (408 ft 5 in) between perpendiculars with a beam of 16.36 metres (53 ft 8 in) and a draught of 4.98 metres (16 ft 4 in). That made them slightly larger than the Iroquois-class destroyers. The vessels are propelled by two shafts with Escher Wyss controllable pitch propellers driven by a CODOG system of two General Electric LM2500 gas turbines, generating 47,500 shaft horsepower (35,400 kW) and one SEMT Pielstick 20 PA6 V 280 diesel engine, generating 8,800 shaft horsepower (6,600 kW).

This gives the frigates a maximum speed of 29 knots (54 km/h; 33 mph) and a range of 7,000 nautical miles (13,000 km; 8,100 mi) at 15 knots (28 km/h; 17 mph) while using their diesel engines. Using their gas turbines, the ships have a range of 3,930 nautical miles (7,280 km; 4,520 mi) at 18 knots (33 km/h; 21 mph). The Halifax class have a complement of 198 naval personnel of which 17 are officers and 17 aircrew of which 8 are officers.

=== Armament and aircraft ===
As built the Halifax-class vessels deployed the CH-124 Sea King helicopter, which acted in concert with shipboard sensors to seek out and destroy submarines at long distances from the ships. The ships have a helicopter deck fitted with a "bear trap" system allowing the launch and recovery of helicopters in up to sea state 6. The Halifax class also carries a close-in anti-submarine weapon in the form of the Mark 46 torpedo, launched from twin Mark 32 Mod 9 torpedo tubes in launcher compartments either side of the forward end of the helicopter hangar.

As built, the anti-shipping role is supported by the RGM-84 Harpoon Block 1C surface-to-surface missile, mounted in two quadruple launch tubes at the main deck level between the funnel and the helicopter hangar. For anti-aircraft self-defence the ships are armed with the Sea Sparrow vertical launch surface-to-air missile in two Mk 48 Mod 0 eight-cell launchers placed to port and starboard of the funnel. The vessels carry 16 missiles. A Raytheon/General Dynamics Phalanx Mark 15 Mod 21 Close-In Weapon System (CIWS) is mounted on top of the helicopter hangar for "last-ditch" defence against targets that evade the Sea Sparrow.

As built, the main gun on the forecastle is a 57 mm (2.2 in)/70 calibre Mark 2 gun from Bofors. (Note: The /70 after calibre denotes the length of the gun barrel as a multiple of the calibre of the projectile. This means that the length of the gun barrel is 70 times the bore diameter.) The gun is capable of firing 2.4-kilogram (5.3 lb) shells at a rate of 220 rounds per minute at a range of more than 17 kilometres (11 mi). The vessels also carry eight 12.7 mm (0.50 in) machine guns.

=== Countermeasures and sensors ===
As built, the decoy system comprises two BAE Systems Shield Mark 2 decoy launchers which fire chaff to 2 kilometres (1.2 mi) and infrared rockets to 169 metres (185 yd) in distraction, confusion and centroid seduction modes. The torpedo decoy is the AN/SLQ-25A Nixie towed acoustic decoy from Argon ST. The ship's radar warning receiver, the CANEWS (Canadian Electronic Warfare System), SLQ-501, and the radar jammer, SLQ-505, were developed by Thorn and Lockheed Martin Canada.

Two Thales Nederland (formerly Signaal) SPG-503 (STIR 1.8) fire control radars are installed one on the roof of the bridge and one on the raised radar platform immediately forward of the helicopter hangar. The ship is also fitted with Raytheon AN/SPS-49(V)5 long-range active air search radar operating at C and D bands, Ericsson HC150 Sea Giraffe medium-range air and surface search radar operating at G and H bands, and Kelvin Hughes Type 1007 I-band navigation radar. The sonar suite includes the CANTASS Canadian Towed Array and GD-C AN/SQS-510 hull mounted sonar and incorporates an acoustic range prediction system. The sonobuoy processing system is the GD-C AN/UYS-503.

=== Modernization ===
The Halifax class underwent a modernization program, known as the Halifax Class Modernization (HCM) program, in order to update the frigates' capabilities in combatting modern smaller, faster and more mobile threats. This involved upgrading the command and control, radar, communications, electronic warfare and armament systems. Further improvements, such as modifying the vessel to accommodate the new Sikorsky CH-148 Cyclone helicopter and satellite links will be done separately from the main Frigate Equipment Life Extension (FELEX) program.

The FELEX program comprised upgrading the combat systems integration to CMS330. The SPS-49 2D long range air search radar was replaced by the Thales Nederland SMART-S Mk 2 E/F-band 3D surveillance radar, and the two STIR 1.8 fire control radars were replaced by a pair of Saab Ceros 200 re-control radars. A Telephonics IFF Mode 5/S interrogator was installed and the Elisra NS9003A-V2HC ESM system replaced the SLQ-501 CANEWS. An IBM multi-link (Link 11, Link 16 and Link 22 enabled) datalink processing system was installed along with two Raytheon Anschütz Pathfinder Mk II navigation radars. Furthermore, Rheinmetall's Multi-Ammunition Soft kill System (MASS), known as MASS DUERAS was introduced to replace the Plessey Shield decoy system. The existing 57 mm Mk 2 guns were upgraded to the Mk 3 standard and the Harpoon missiles were improved to Block II levels, the Phalanx was upgraded to Block 1B and the obsolete Sea Sparrow system was replaced by the Evolved Sea Sparrow Missile.

== Service history ==
Montréal was laid down on 8 February 1991 by Saint John Shipbuilding Ltd. at Saint John and launched on 28 February 1992. She was commissioned into the Canadian Forces on 21 July 1994 by Francine St-Pierre and carries the hull classification symbol FFH 336. The vessel is designated as a Bilingual Language Unit in the Royal Canadian Navy. Due to the unit's bilingual status, her name can be expressed in both English and French, the only sea-going ship in the Royal Canadian Navy with such distinction. Her name can be expressed as: HMCS Montreal, NCSM Montréal, HMCS Montréal, or NCSM Montreal. In January 1995 Montréal joined the NATO mission in the Adriatic Sea enforcing the United Nations blockade of Yugoslavia. Twice she acted as the flagship of the force before returning to Canada on 19 July 2005. In 1997 as part of an experiment to reduce noise, the warship had 12,500 anechoic tiles added to her hull. The experiment was not successful. As part of a NATO fleet in 1998, Montréal sailed to Saint Petersburg, Russia as part of celebrations of the 300th anniversary of the Russian Navy. The frigate represented Canada in the Millennium International Fleet Review in New York City.

In July 2000, the American merchant ship GTS Katie refused to bring its Canadian military cargo into port, claiming unpaid fees. On 30 July, the Canadian Forces sent the destroyer HMCS Athabaskan to maintain contact with the rogue ship and deployed Montréal the following day. As part of Operation Megaphone, a detachment of personnel was sent over by CH-124 Sea King to board Katie. The crew of the merchant ship offered no resistance and the ship was escorted into port. The captain of the ship later claimed that the ship had been attacked and the boarding had been "dangerous". The Canadian Defence Minister later rebuffed those charges, claiming the boarding had been necessary.

In 2002, Montréal sailed to take part in Operation Apollo, Canada's naval contribution to the War in Afghanistan. Arriving on 9 September the frigate remained in theatre until 25 April 2003. The warship had remained longer than usual in theatre due to a crash of a CH-124 Sea King aboard her replacement, the destroyer HMCS Iroquois. In 2004, the frigate sailed to the Arctic, becoming the first major Canadian warship to visit the region since 1982. In January 2005, Montréal deployed as part of a NATO rapid reaction force. On 8 February 2005 a crewmember was lost overboard and subsequently pronounced dead.

The warship participated in Operation Nanook in 2010. In 2010 Montréal engaged in acceptance trials for the new CH-148 Cyclone maritime helicopter. Several modifications had to be made for the trials to the ship, including adding night-vision friendly green filters to the flight deck landing lights and reinforcing the flight deck due to the Cyclone being heavier than the CH-124 Sea King. Montréal successfully completed the tests which included routine flying operations as well as responding to some critical situations.

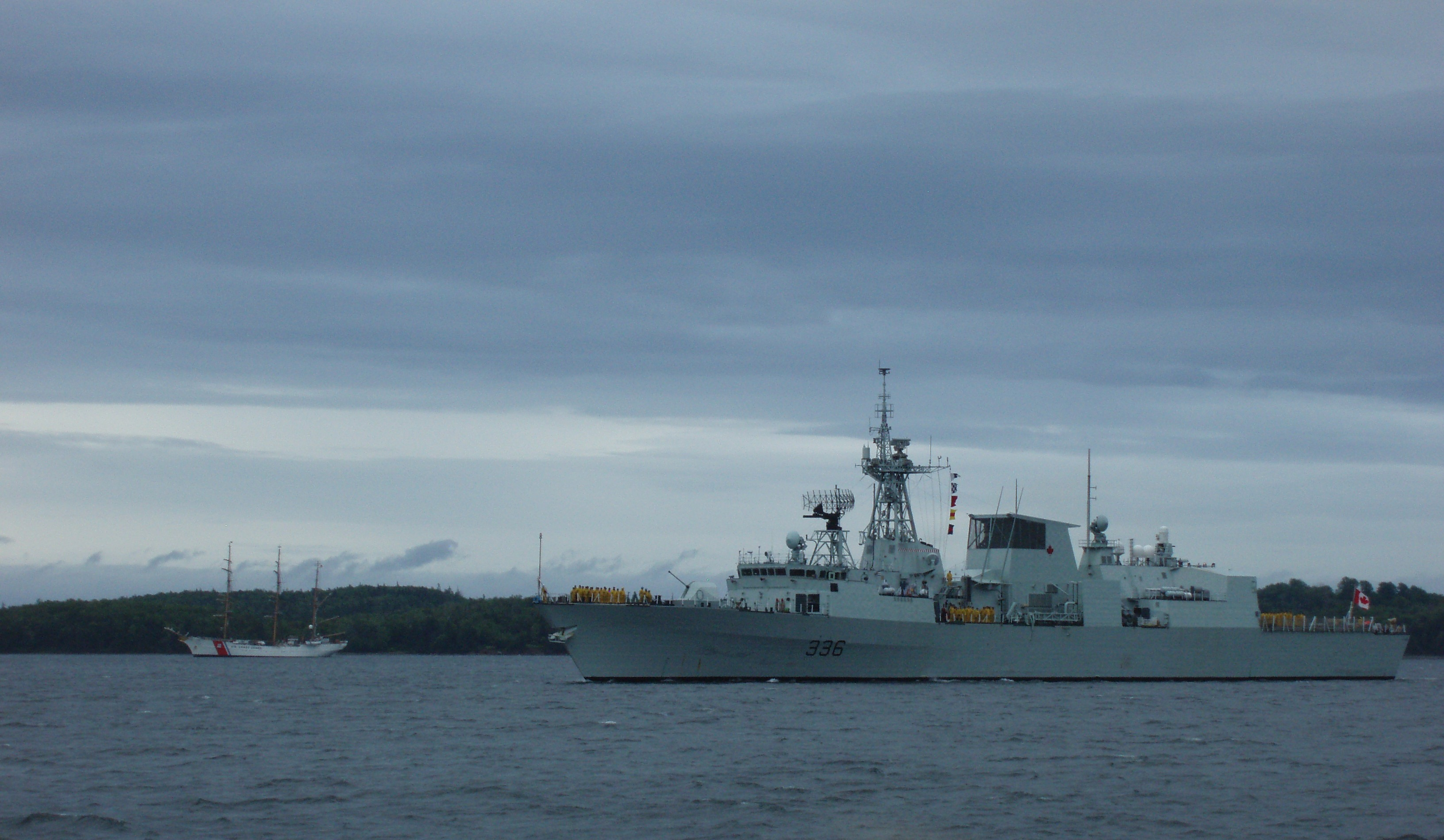
Montréal with USCGC Eagle in 2011

On 3 July 2011, as part of their national Canadian tour, the Duke and Duchess of Cambridge embarked on the vessel which conveyed them from Montréal to Quebec City. In August, Montréal sailed up the St. Lawrence Seaway into Lake Ontario as part of Great Lakes Deployment 11 where she visited multiple cities including Toronto, Hamilton, Montréal, and Trois-Rivières. On 5 July 2012, Montréal was turned over to Irving Shipbuilding's Halifax Shipyards, to start an 18-month mid-life upgrading and modernization (HCM/FELEX). Montréal re-joined the fleet after completing the Halifax Class Modernization refit on 26 September 2013. Subsequently, Montréal conducted sea trials for her new combat and weapons systems. Montréal achieved Restricted Readiness on 9 May 2014. After further Sea Acceptance Trials and Work Ups, Montréal assumed Normal Readiness on 9 March 2015, being the fifth post-refit frigate to achieve this milestone.

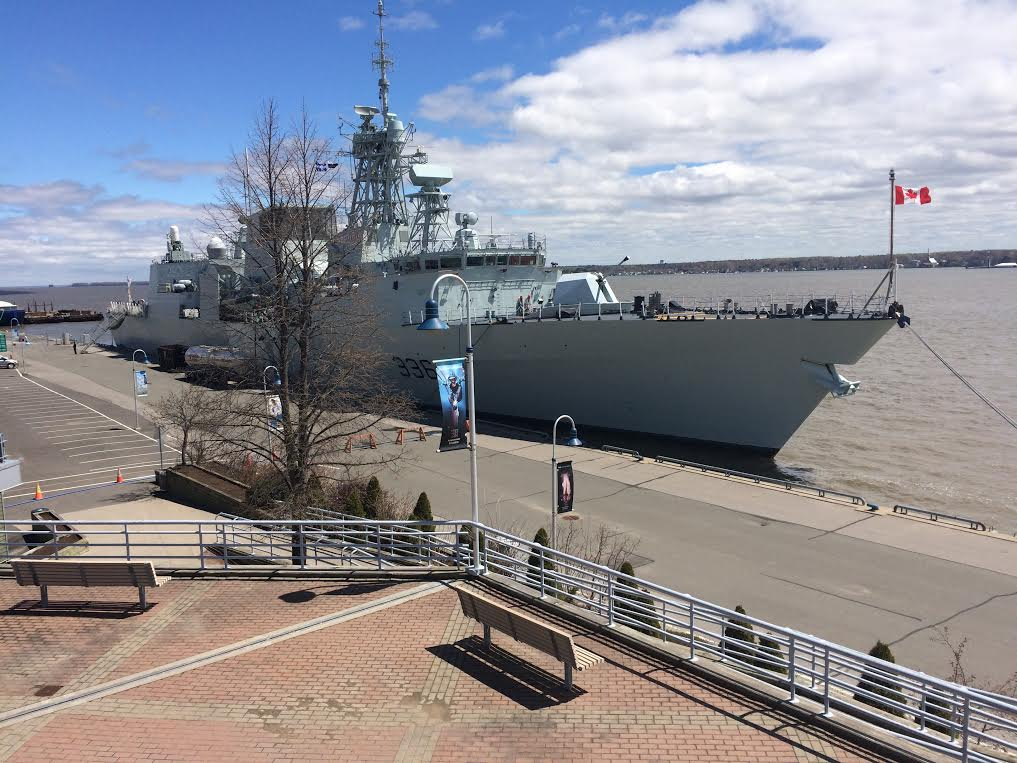
Trois-Rivières port, Mauricie, May 2017. The crew of HMCS Montréal were deployed to participate in flood relief efforts.

In late 2015, Montréal deployed for a large NATO naval exercise, Joint Warrior. On completion of this exercise, Montréal participated in "At Sea Demonstration 2015" (ASD 2015), a multinational exercise that took place off the Hebrides Islands of Scotland in October 2015. The exercise was conducted under the Maritime Theater Missile Defence Forum (MTMD), an international group that aims to improve maritime integrated air and missile defence capabilities within a coalition context. While on exercise during a port visit in Faslane, Scotland, Montréal hosted an official royal visit by Prince Charles who was recently appointed as Commodore in Chief of the Royal Canadian Navy's Atlantic Fleet. Montréal returned to Halifax on 27 November 2015.

The ship participated in further sea trials with the CH-148 Cyclone helicopters off the coast of Nova Scotia in March 2016. In April it was announced that Montréal and sister ship Fredericton would be the test ships for the Royal Canadian Navy's planned reduced crew size trials. On 24 October 2016, Montréal began her first deployment after conversion to an experimental ship. In May 2017, 120 of the crew were deployed in the Mauricie region of Quebec to participate in flood relief efforts. In August 2017, Montréal and the Kingston-class coastal defence vessels HMCS Kingston and HMCS Moncton departed Halifax to take part in the Operation Nanook in Canada's northern waters.

On 19 January 2022, Montréal left Halifax to join SNMG2 as part of Operation Reassurance. She returned to Halifax following the completion of her deployment on 15 July 2022. On 26 March 2023, the frigate and the supply ship Asterix left Halifax on a deployment to the South China Sea and the Indo-Pacific region. On 3 June, the People's Liberation Army Navy warship Suzhou cut across the bow of USS Chung-Hoon while the American destroyer was transiting the Taiwan Strait together with Montréal; the closest point of approach was 140 metres (150 yd). The vessel returned to Halifax on 3 October. The frigate departed for Pacific waters again in April 2024 for a six-month deployment.
