= Chloride Electrical Storage Company =

British battery company

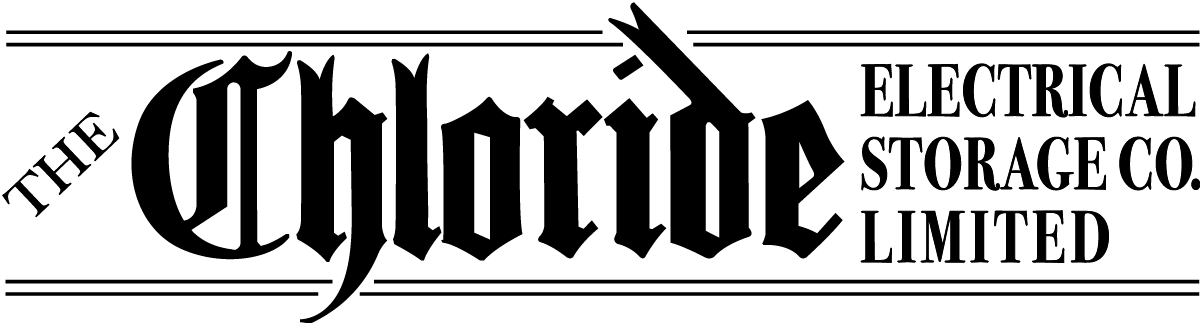
Chloride Electrical Storage Co. Logo

Chloride Electrical Storage Company was a British company that manufactures and sells storage batteries. The company has approximately 35 subsidiary companies in the UK, several being dormant, most are wholly owned and some 22 subsidiary and associated companies in overseas countries.

== Early history ==
The company was originally registered as Chloride Electrical Storage Syndicate on 12 December 1891. It was formed in a deal between the Electric Storage Battery Company (E.S.B. Co.) of New Jersey, and the United Gas Improvement Company based in Pennsylvania and John A. E. Hickson to expand outside the USA using patents and "applications" assigned by the parent companies. It was reconstituted as the Chloride Electrical Storage Company in 1902.

== Products ==
Until 1914–1918 most of the demand was for large stationary batteries used in early generating stations and for domestic lighting installations. New and growing demand came for batteries on submarines, and after the First World War, the company's batteries were in growing demand for use in train lighting, motor vehicles and as accumulators for valve radio receiving sets.

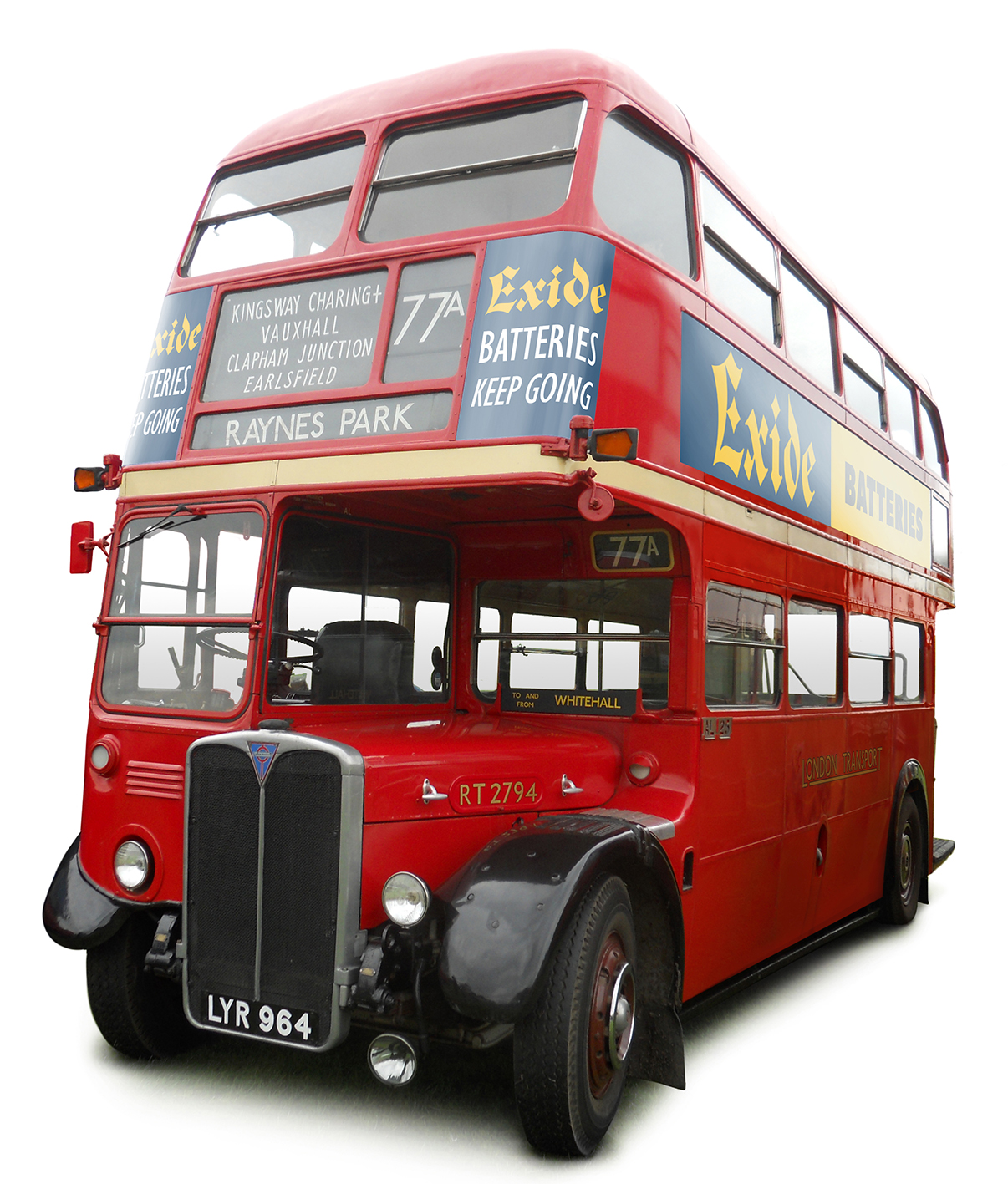
London Transport RT Bus with Exide Advertisements

== Acquisitions ==
The company made acquisitions of alkaline battery and lead-acid battery manufacturing companies and became a supplier of automotive and traction batteries.

The company acquired two of its moulded battery casings suppliers, Lorival in 1927 and United Ebonite Manufacturers in 1934, merging them in 1939, to form a new subsidiary United Ebonite & Lorival Ltd.

== Customers ==
The company supplied Indian Railways, Ford, Rolls-Royce and Vauxhall. Demand increased during the Second World War.
