= HMCS Tecumseh =

- Badge of HMCS Tecumseh
- Active: 1941–present
- Country: Canada
- Branch: Royal Canadian Navy
- Type: Stone frigate
- Part of: Canadian Forces Naval Reserve
- Garrison/HQ: 1820 24 Street SW, Calgary, Alberta
- Nickname: 'Tec'
- Patron: Tecumseh
- Motto: In pace bellum para (Latin for 'In peace prepare for war')
- Colors: Black and gold
- Anniversaries: Battle of the Atlantic
- Equipment: Various types of inboard and outboard rigid-hull inflatable boats
- Battle honours: None

HMCS Tecumseh is a Canadian Forces Naval Reserve division (NRD) located in Calgary, Alberta. Dubbed a stone frigate, HMCS Tecumseh is a land-based naval training establishment crewed by part-time sailors and also serves as a local recruitment centre for the Royal Canadian Navy (RCN). It is one of 24 naval reserve divisions located in major cities across Canada.

== Namesake ==
Tecumseh

HMCS Tecumseh is named after the Shawnee warrior and chief, who became the primary leader of a large, multi-tribal confederacy in the early 19th century. Tecumseh is honoured in Canada as a hero and military commander who played a major role in Canada's successful repulsion of several American invasions during the War of 1812, which, among other things, eventually led to Canadian Confederation in 1867. The name also harkens to HMS Tecumseth, a 175-ton schooner warship which operated on the Upper Great Lakes 1815–1831. A reproduction of her was built in 1992 at the historic dockyard in Penetanguishene, Ontario, which was the vessels base of operations during most of her service.

== History ==
Calgary's Naval Reserve division was established on 31 March 1923 as the Calgary Half-Company. From 1935 to 1940 it was known as the Calgary Division until being christened HMCS Tecumseh on 1 November 1941. In 1943, the division moved to its present location on 17 Avenue SW.

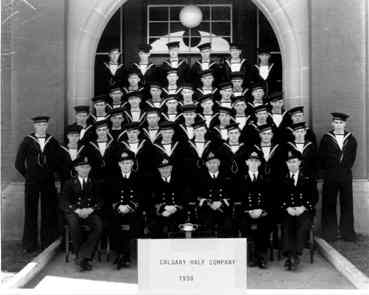
The Calgary Half-Company of the Royal Canadian Naval Volunteer Reserve (RCNVR) poses for a formal portrait in 1938.

During the Second World War, over 4,500 personnel enlisted at Tecumseh. Of those 52 were killed in action. Among them was Lieutenant Robert Hampton Gray, RCNVR, the only person in the RCN to receive the Victoria Cross.

Unlike some Naval Reserve divisions in Canada, Tecumseh survived post-war defence cuts. It has since survived other challenges including the 1968 Unification of the Canadian Armed Forces, and a major fire in 1981. Rebuilt since the fire, Tecumseh is a fully modern training facility.

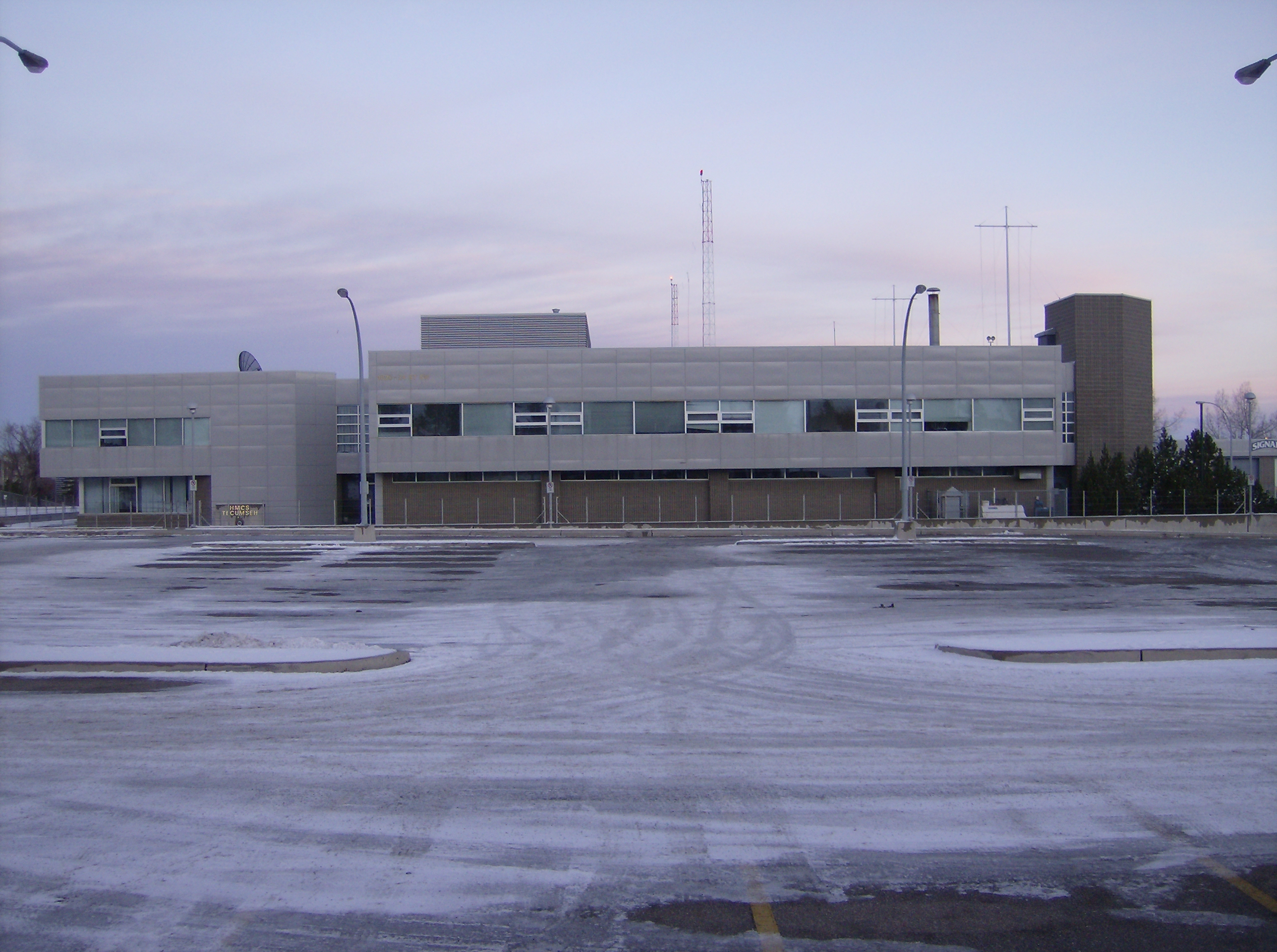
HMCS Tecumseh (2006)

Subsequent to rebuilding, Tecumseh became the headquarters of the first female flag officer in the Canadian Navy, Commodore Laraine Orthlieb. In 1992, several members of Tecumseh volunteered for duty in the aftermath of the Gulf War, and two were selected to serve on board HMCS Huron. With the arrival of the Kingston-class coastal defence vessels, officers from Tecumseh were selected as the commissioning captains of HMC ships Edmonton, Whitehorse, Saskatoon and Brandon.

Tecumseh personnel were deployed to combat Manitoba's 1997 flood, provided security at the 1997 APEC meeting in Vancouver, and assisted in the recovery mission following the Swissair Flight 111 crash off Halifax as members of the maritime coastal defence vessel crews assigned to the operation. More recently, Tecumseh personnel have provided support for the G8 Summit in 2002 and participated in Operation Apollo in the Gulf of Oman in 2003. Members of the ship's company now regularly deploy as part of Operation Caribbe, in support of international drug interdiction efforts.

Tecumseh helped mark the centennial of the Canadian Navy in 2010, a significant year in Calgary's military history, with three army reserve units also celebrating 100th anniversaries.

In 2013, members of HMCS Tecumseh took part in the Nijmegen Marches, which consist of four days of marching through the countryside and crowded streets of towns and villages in the Nijmegen area of the Netherlands. Each military participant marches 160 kilometres while wearing standard combat clothing and carrying a military backpack weighing at least 10 kilograms.

== Operations ==
HMCS Tecumseh is properly referred to as a ship, as it has been officially christened as His Majesty's Canadian ship. However, since the ship is part of the reserves it does not operate full time, except for the museum. Rather, most of the operations occur in the evening on weekdays. The primary operations of the ship include a recruitment office, two cadet corps, the Canadian Naval Museum (Naval Museum of Alberta), and the Tecumseh Naval Reserve Band.

== Lodger units ==
- 3 Squadron, 41 Signal Regiment (Canadian Army Reserve)
- 22 Royal Canadian Sea Cadet Corps Undaunted
- 2509 (RC) Signal Cadet Corps.
- Navy League Cadet Corps Captain Jackson

== See also ==
- Stone frigate
- Military in Calgary
