= Saskatoon (disambiguation) =

Saskatoon is the largest city in the province of Saskatchewan

Saskatoon can refer to:

== Geography ==
- Saskatoon (electoral district), a former Canadian federal electoral district
- Saskatoon Metropolitan Area, the area around the city of Saskatoon
- Saskatoon City (disambiguation)

== Science and technology ==
- Amelanchier alnifolia or saskatoon, a shrub and berry native to North America
- Saskatoon experiment, an experiment to measure anisotropies in the cosmic microwave background

== Sports ==
- Saskatoon Blades, a Western Hockey League ice hockey team

== Vessels ==
- HMCS Saskatoon (MM 709), a patrol vessel in the Canadian Forces
