= Nanaimo (disambiguation) =

Nanaimo is a city in the Canadian province of British Columbia.

Nanaimo may also refer to:

- Regional District of Nanaimo
- Nanaimo Harbour
- Nanaimo Museum
- Nanaimo Bastion
- Nanaimo Airport
- Nanaimo Port Authority
- Nanaimo Harbour ferry terminal
- Nanaimo Harbour Water Aerodrome
- Nanaimo Regional Transit System
- Nanaimo station
- Nanaimo station (Via Rail)
- Nanaimo River
- Nanaimo Lakes
- Nanaimo Station, an elevated Skytrain station in East Vancouver, British Columbia
- HMCS Nanaimo, several warships
- Nanaimo bar, a dessert bar of Canadian origin
- For the list of various electoral districts, past and present, see List of electoral districts in Greater Nanaimo
