= Jeumont (disambiguation) =

Jeumont may refer to:

- Jeumont, a commune in the Maubeuge-Nord canton department in northern France
- Forges et Ateliers de Construction Electriques de Jeumont, precursor to Jeumont-Schneider
- Jeumont-Schneider, French electric and mechanical engineering group
- Jeumont Electric, electric engineering company created from Jeumont-Schneider
