= HMCS Yellowknife =

Royal Canadian Navy coastal defence vessel

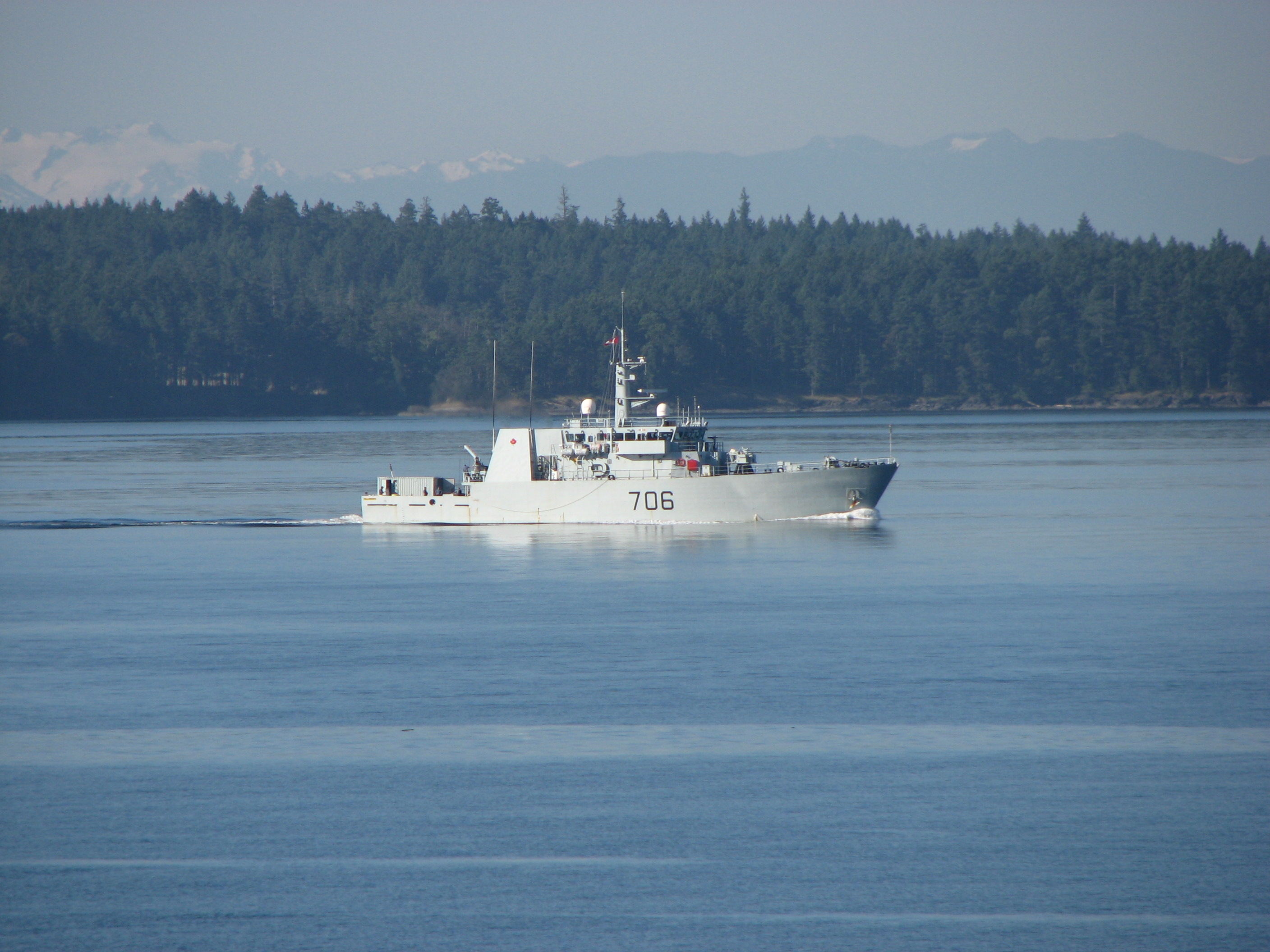
- HMCS Yellowknife underway

History

Canada
- Name: Yellowknife
- Namesake: Yellowknife, Northwest Territories
- Builder: Halifax Shipyards Ltd., Halifax, Nova Scotia
- Laid down: 7 November 1996
- Launched: 5 June 1997
- Commissioned: 18 April 1998
- Home port: CFB Halifax
- Identification: MMSI number: 316191000; Callsign: CGAY; Pennant number: MM 706
- Status: Active

General characteristics
- Class & type: Kingston-class coastal defence vessel
- Displacement: 970 long tons (986 t)
- Length: 55.3 m (181 ft 5 in)
- Beam: 11.3 m (37 ft 1 in)
- Draught: 3.4 m (11 ft 2 in)
- Propulsion: 4 × Jeumont ANR-53-50 alternators, 4 × 600VAC Wärtsilä UD 23V12 diesel engines, 7.2 MW (9,700 hp); 2 × Jeumont CI 560L motors, 3,000 hp (2,200 kW); 2 × LIPS Z drive azimuth thrusters
- Speed: 15 knots (28 km/h; 17 mph)
- Range: 5,000 nmi (9,300 km; 5,800 mi) at 8 kn (15 km/h; 9.2 mph)
- Complement: 37
- Sensors & processing systems: Kelvin Hughes navigation radar (I-band); Kelvin Hughes 6000 surface search radar (E-F band); Global Positioning System; AN/SQS-511 towed side scan sonar; Remote-control Mine Hunting System (RMHS)
- Armament: 1 × Bofors 40 mm/60 Mk 5C gun (removed from the class); 2 × M2 machine guns

HMCS Yellowknife is a Kingston-class coastal defence vessel that has served in the Canadian Forces since 1998. Yellowknife is the seventh ship of her class. She is the first vessel to use the designation Yellowknife in the Royal Canadian Navy. The coastal defence vessel is assigned to Maritime Forces Pacific (MARPAC) and is homeported at CFB Esquimalt.

== Design and description ==
The Kingston class was designed to fill the minesweeper, coastal patrol and reserve training needs of the Canadian Forces, replacing the Bay-class minesweepers, Porte-class gate vessels and Royal Canadian Mounted Police coastal launches in those roles. In order to perform these varied duties the Kingston-class vessels are designed to carry up to three 6.1-metre (20 ft) ISO containers with power hookups on the open deck aft in order to embark mission-specific payloads. The seven module types available for embarkation include four route survey, two mechanical minesweeping and one bottom inspection modules.

The Kingston class displace 970 long tons (986 t) and are 55.3 metres (181 ft 5 in) long overall with a beam 11.3 metres (37 ft 1 in) and a draught of 3.4 metres (11 ft 2 in). The coastal defence vessels are powered by four Jeumont ANR-53-50 alternators coupled to four Wärtsilä UD 23V12 diesel engines creating 7.2 megawatts (9,700 hp). Two LIPS Z-drive azimuth thrusters are driven by two Jeumont CI 560L motors creating 3,000 horsepower (2,200 kW) and the Z drives can be rotated 360°. This gives the ships a maximum speed of 15 knots (28 km/h; 17 mph) and a range of 5,000 nautical miles (9,300 km; 5,800 mi) at 8 knots (15 km/h; 9.2 mph).

The Kingston class is equipped with a Kelvin Hughes navigational radar using the I band and a Kelvin Hughes 6000 surface search radar scanning the E and F bands. The vessels carry an AN/SQS-511 towed side scan sonar for minesweeping and a Remote-control Mine Hunting System (RMHS). The vessels are equipped with one Bofors 40 mm/60 calibre Mk 5C gun and two M2 machine guns. (Note: The 60 calibre denotes the length of the gun. This means that the length of the gun barrel is 60 times the bore diameter.) The 40 mm gun was declared obsolete and removed from the vessels in 2014. Some of them ended up as museum pieces and on display at naval reserve installations across Canada. The Kingston-class coastal defence vessels have a complement of 37.

== Service history ==
Yellowknife's keel was laid down on 7 November 1996 by Halifax Shipyards Ltd. at Halifax, Nova Scotia and was launched on 5 June 1997. The coastal defence vessel transferred to the west coast in January 1998 and was commissioned into the Canadian Forces on 18 April 1998 at Esquimalt, British Columbia and carries the hull number MM 706. In December 1998, the vessel collided with another minesweeper during operations off Victoria, British Columbia while trying to avoid floating obstacles. On 18 June 1999 the vessel was given freedom of the city of Yellowknife, Northwest Territories.

Yellowknife, accompanied by frigates Winnipeg and Calgary and sister ship Brandon, departed in October 2014 to take part in San Francisco Fleet Week and the Task Group Exercise with the US Navy in American coastal waters. Following those exercises, Yellowknife and Brandon deployed as part of Operation Caribbe, completing their tour on 4 December. In June 2016, Calgary, Vancouver, Saskatoon and Yellowknife sailed from Esquimalt to participate in the RIMPAC naval exercise. After reports surfaced of a lost nuclear bomb was discovered off the coast of British Columbia, Yellowknife was sent to investigate and recover the item. Divers from Yellowknife determined the object was not the missing bomb. From August to September 2017, Yellowknife and sister ship Edmonton sailed to the Arctic Ocean to perform surveillance of Canada's northern waters as part of Operation Limpid. They returned to Esquimalt on 5 October.

In June and July 2018, Yellowknife and sister ship Whitehorse were deployed off the coast of Southern California while taking part in RIMPAC 2018. Whitehorse and Yellowknife both deployed to the Pacific as part of Operation Caribbe on 15 March 2019. The two ships returned to Esquimalt on 16 May, having participated in the interception of 2,657 kg (5,858 lb) of cocaine and 25 kg (55 lb) of illicit marijuana. Yellowknife and Saskatoon departed in March 2022 for Operation Caribbe in the eastern Pacific. The two ships intercepted 872 kg (1,922 lb) of cocaine. They returned to Canada in May.

HMCS Yellowknife has transferred to the Atlantic and she is scheduled to decommission in 2026.
