= HMCS Saskatoon (MM 709) =

Royal Canadian Navy coastal defence vessel

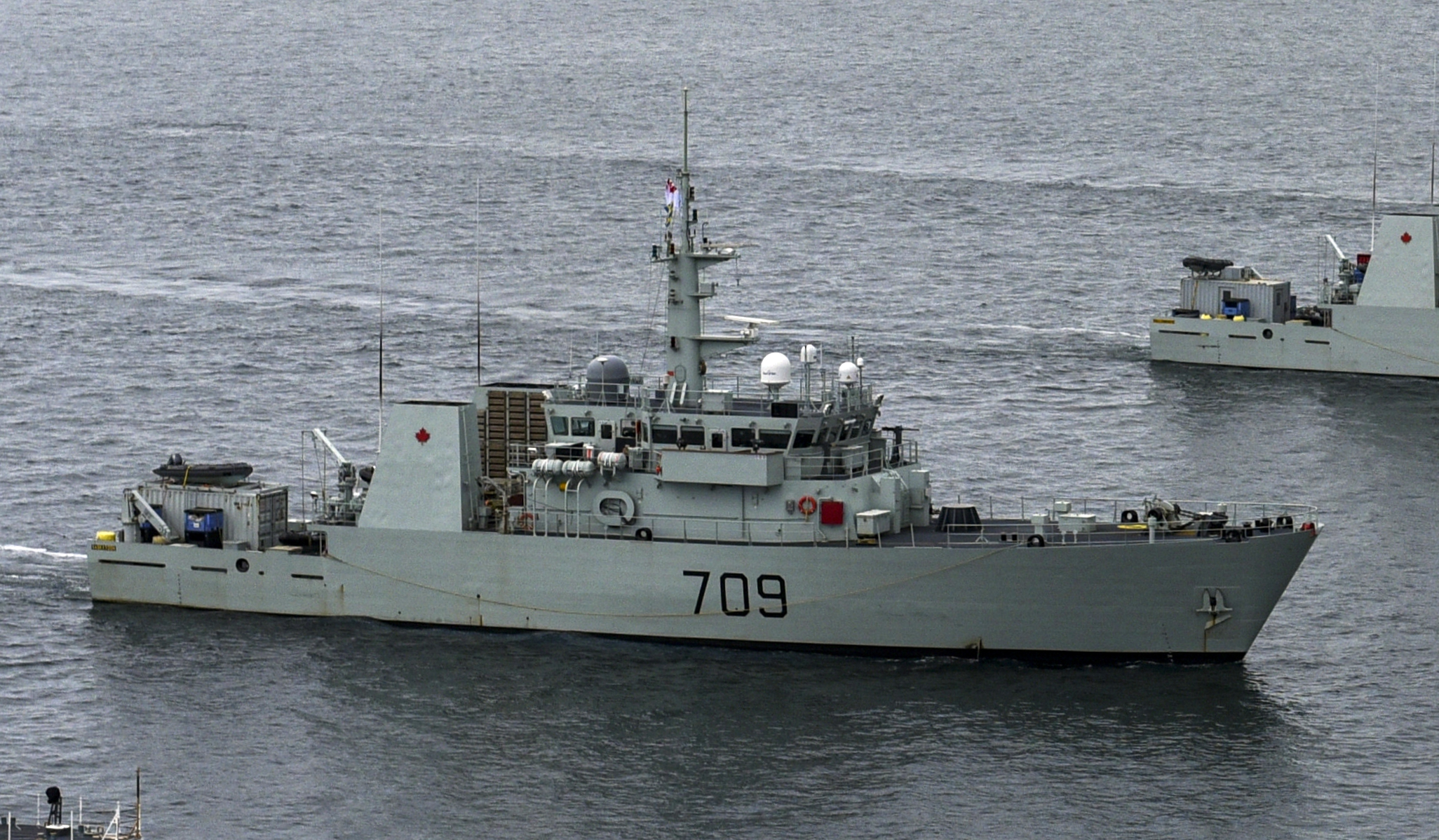

History

Canada
- Name: Saskatoon
- Namesake: Saskatoon, Saskatchewan
- Builder: Halifax Shipyards Ltd., Halifax, Nova Scotia
- Laid down: 5 September 1997
- Launched: 30 March 1998
- Commissioned: 5 December 1998
- Decommissioned: 29 September 2025
- Home port: CFB Esquimalt
- Identification: MMSI number: 316259000; Callsign: CGJG; Pennant number: MM 709
- Honours and awards: Atlantic, 1942–45
- Status: Decommissioned

General characteristics
- Class & type: Kingston-class coastal defence vessel
- Displacement: 970 long tons (986 t)
- Length: 55.3 m (181 ft 5 in)
- Beam: 11.3 m (37 ft 1 in)
- Draught: 3.4 m (11 ft 2 in)
- Propulsion: 4 × Jeumont ANR-53-50 alternators, 4 × 600VAC Wärtsilä UD 23V12 diesel engines, 7.2 MW (9,700 hp); 2 × Jeumont CI 560L motors, 2,200 kW (3,000 hp); 2 × LIPS Z drive azimuth thrusters
- Speed: 15 knots (28 km/h; 17 mph)
- Range: 5,000 nmi (9,300 km; 5,800 mi) at 8 kn (15 km/h; 9.2 mph)
- Complement: 37
- Sensors & processing systems: Kelvin Hughes navigation radar (I-band); Kelvin Hughes 6000 surface search radar (E-F band); Global Positioning System; AN/SQS-511 towed side scan sonar; Remote-control Mine Hunting System (RMHS)
- Armament: 1 × Bofors 40 mm/60 Mk 5C gun (removed from the class); 2 × M2 machine guns

HMCS Saskatoon is a decommissioned Kingston-class coastal defence vessel delivered to the Canadian Forces in 1998. Saskatoon is the tenth ship of her class and was the second vessel to use the designation HMCS Saskatoon. Named after the Canadian city of Saskatoon, Saskatchewan, other references to the city are found on the ship with the ship's captain's desk named Cranberry Flats and a main corridor in the ship named after Idylwyld Drive. Saskatoon was assigned to Maritime Forces Pacific (MARPAC) of the Royal Canadian Navy and was homeported at Canadian Forces Base (CFB) Esquimalt. The ship was decommissioned in 2025.

== Design and description ==
The Kingston-class coastal defence vessel was designed and built as a result of the Maritime Coastal Defence Vessel Project undertaken by the Department of National Defence beginning in the mid-1980s. Aimed to fulfill the minesweeper, coastal patrol and reserve training needs of the Canadian Armed Forces, the Kingston class replaced the Anticosti and Bay-class minesweepers, Porte-class gate vessels and Royal Canadian Mounted Police coastal launches. Following their construction, the vessels became known as the Kingston-class maritime coastal defence vessels (MCDVs). The Kingston class was designed to conduct eighteen-day coastal defence missions, with a mixed gender crew of twenty-four, and the ability to deploy out of area for up to six months with a crew of thirty-seven for mine warfare or training missions. In order to perform the various duties assigned to them, the Kingston-class vessels are designed embark mission-specific payloads contained in three powered 6.1-metre (20 ft) ISO containers on the open deck aft. Seven module types available for embarkation on the Kingston class include: four route survey, two mechanical minesweeping and one bottom inspection modules.

Built to the same specifications, all twelve Kingston-class vessels are steel hulled vessels built to commercial standards with naval hull shock resistance, damage control and compartment subdivision features. The vessels displace 990 tonnes (970 long tons) and are 55.3 metres (181 ft 5 in) long overall, with a beam of 11.3 metres (37 ft 1 in) and a draught of 3.4 metres (11 ft 2 in). The vessels are powered by four Jeumont ANR-53-50 alternators coupled to four Wärtsilä UD 23V12 diesel engines creating 7.2 megawatts (9,700 hp). Two 360° rotating LIPS Z-drive azimuth thrusters on the Kingston class are driven by two Jeumont CI 560L motors creating 2,200 kilowatts (3,000 hp) giving the ships a maximum speed of 15 knots (28 km/h; 17 mph) and a range of 5,000 nautical miles (9,300 km; 5,800 mi) at 8 knots (15 km/h; 9.2 mph).

The Kingston class are equipped with a Kelvin Hughes navigational radar using the I-band (NATO) and a Kelvin Hughes 6000 surface search radar scanning the E and F bands. The vessels carry an AN/SQS-511 towed side scan sonar for minesweeping and a remote-control mine hunting system (RMHS).

The vessels were originally equipped with one Bofors 40 mm/60 calibre Mk 5C gun and two M2 machine guns. Intended for exploding floating mines and self-defence, the Bofors guns installed on the MCDVs once served on the aircraft carrier HMCS Bonaventure and as anti-aircraft guns located at CFB Lahr/CFB Baden in Germany. Declared obsolete and removed from the vessels in 2014, some of the MCDV Bofors guns ended up as museum pieces on display at various naval reserve installations across Canada, with Saskatoon's gun being donated to the naval reserve division HMCS Unicorn in Saskatoon, Saskatchewan. (Note: The 60 calibre denotes the length of the gun. This means that the length of the gun barrel is 60 times the bore diameter.)

== Construction and career ==
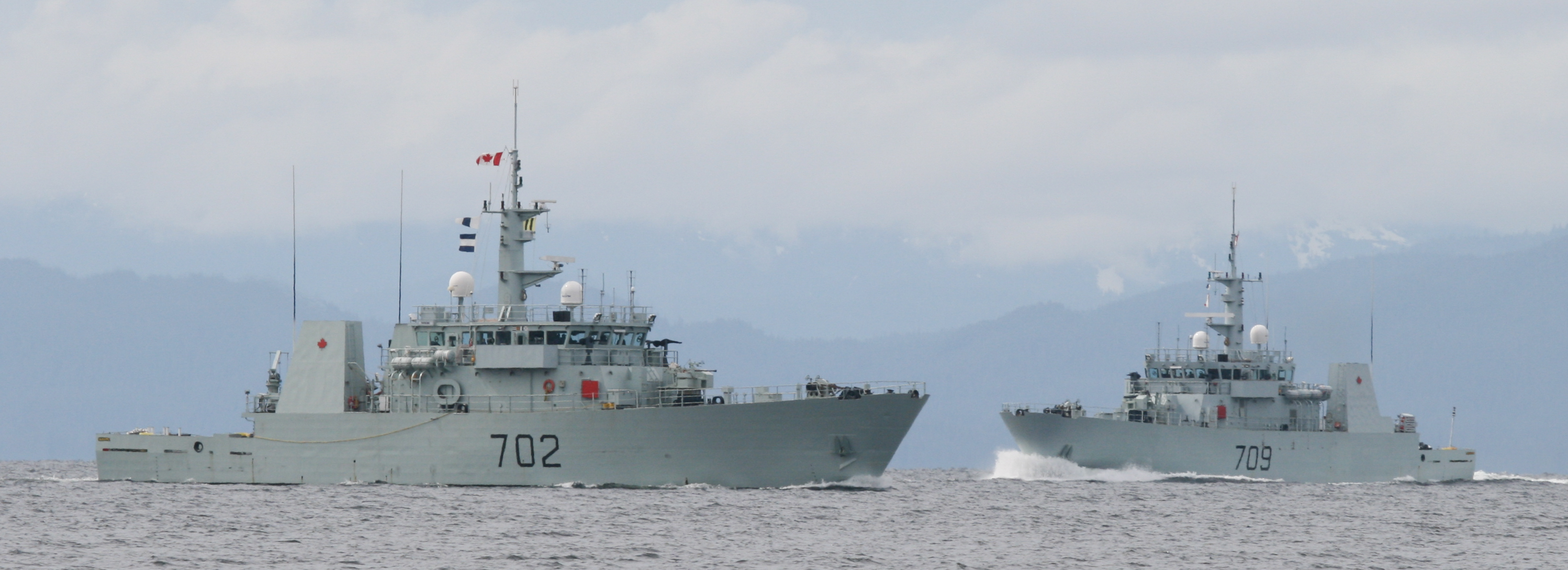
HMCS Nanaimo and Saskatoon off Vancouver Island in 2007

Saskatoon was laid down on 5 September 1997 by Halifax Shipyards Ltd. at Halifax, Nova Scotia and was launched on 30 March 1998. The ship transferred to the west coast in September 1998 and was commissioned into the RCN on 5 December 1998 at Esquimalt, British Columbia. Saskatoon carries the hull classification symbol MM 709. Named after the city of Saskatoon, Saskatchewan, references to the city are found on the ship with the ship's captain's desk named Cranberry Flats and a main corridor in the ship named after Idylwyld Drive.

In 2007, a court martial revealed that a third of Saskatoon's crew used illicit drugs, namely cocaine, leading to a Canadian Armed Forces wide drug use investigation.

In February 2012, Saskatoon took part in Exercise Pacific Guardian, a joint coastal defence exercise. During the exercise, Saskatoon, along with sister ships Nanaimo and Brandon trained with naval reserve units, and United States Coast Guard vessels involving various scenarios focused on drug or immigrant smuggling, pollution detection, marine mammal sightings, shellfish poaching, illegal logging and criminal activities.

In February 2016 Edmonton and Saskatoon deployed to Operation Caribbe. As part of Canada's contribution to the multinational campaign combating illicit trafficking in the Caribbean Sea and the Eastern Pacific Ocean, on 19 March Saskatoon intercepted a fishing boat, that when observed by Saskatoon, jettisoned its cargo and fled. Saskatoon's crew subsequently recovered ten bales or 360 kilograms (790 lb) of cocaine from the water. On 25 March, a patrol aircraft spotted a boat in international waters, which when noticing the plane, dumped its cargo and fled. Dispatched to search the area, Saskatoon recovered sixteen bales of cocaine totaling 640 kilograms (1,410 lb). On 29 April 2016 Saskatoon, along with Edmonton returned to Esquimalt. In June 2016, Calgary, Vancouver, Saskatoon and Yellowknife sailed from Esquimalt to Hawaii to participate in the biannual international maritime warfare exercise Rim of the Pacific Exercise (RIMPAC).

Saskatoon once again deployed to Operation Caribbe, departing CFB Esquimalt on 20 February 2017. While taking part in the operation, Saskatoon intercepted a small vessel carrying roughly 660 kg (1,460 lb) of cocaine on 12 March in cooperation with the United States Coast Guard. On 6 April, Saskatoon moved to intercept a fishing vessel off in international waters, launching its rigid-hulled inflatable boat (RHIB) with United States Coast Guard personnel embarked. Upon boarding the vessel, Saskatoon's crew retrieved eleven bales of cocaine, totaling 464 kg (1,023 lb) and arrested three people. A week later, Saskatoon moved to intercept two more vessels in international waters. Upon approaching the suspected vessels, 750 kg (1,650 lb) of cocaine was dumped by the occupants and while one of the vessels was caught the other escaped. Saskatoon returned to CFB Esquimalt on 28 April 2017.

In July 2019 Saskatoon was laid up in Victoria, British Columbia's Upper Harbour for six months of maintenance. Scheduled to return to service in February 2020, Saskatoon received planned upgrades to its hull, galley, HVAC, and fire fighting system. From February to May 2021, Saskatoon and sister ship Brandon deployed as part of Operation Caribbe, taking part in the interception of illicit drugs off the coasts of the Pacific coast of Mexico and Central America. Saskatoon seized an estimated 200 million dollars of illicit drugs. From February to May 2022, Saskatoon and sister ship Yellowknife deployed as part of Operation Caribbe, taking part in the interception of illicit drugs off the coasts of the Eastern Pacific.

In July 2025 it was announced that HMCS Saskatoon and seven of her sister ships would be decommissioned before the end of the year. The ship was decommissioned on 29 September 2025 at Esquimalt.
