= HMCS Brandon =

Several Canadian naval units have been named HMCS Brandon.

- HMCS Brandon (K149) (I), a Flower-class corvette that served in the Royal Canadian Navy during the Battle of the Atlantic.
- HMCS Brandon (MM 710) (II), a Kingston-class coastal defence vessel in the Royal Canadian Navy, commissioned in 1999.

== Battle honours ==
- Atlantic, 1941–45
- Gulf of St. Lawrence, 1944
