= HMCS Saskatoon =

Several Canadian naval units have been named HMCS Saskatoon after the city;

- HMCS Saskatoon (K158) was a Flower-class corvette commissioned in 1941 and served until 1945 as a convoy escort.
- HMCS Saskatoon (MM 709) is a Kingston-class coastal defence vessel that is currently in service. She was commissioned in 1998.

== Battle honours ==
Atlantic 1942-45

== Badge ==
Vert a lion passant guardant crowned with a naval coronet Or sails Argent and grasping in the dexter paw a Saskatoon bush irradiated and fructed proper leaved Or.

=== Significance ===
The gold lion is taken from the symbol used by the City of Saskatoon. The lion wears a naval coronet, and grasps a Saskatoon bush thereby making reference to the name of the City.

== Motto ==
FORTIS CEU LEO FIDUS (Brave as a faithful lion)
