= Operation Caribbe =

Canadian anti-trafficking Caribbean mission since 2006

- Part of the war on drugs
Date	November 2006 – present
Location	Caribbean Sea
Status	Ongoing

Belligerents
Canada	Illicit trafficking operators

Operation Caribbe is the Canadian Armed Forces contribution to the elimination of illegal trafficking in the Caribbean Sea and the eastern Pacific Ocean by organized crime. The operation began in 2006 and its mandate has been altered twice since then. It operates as part of Operation Martillo.

== History ==
In 2005, Canada agreed to send CP-140 Aurora aircraft for maritime detection purposes in the Caribbean Sea. Operation Caribbe began in November 2006. In October 2010 the mission was expanded with the signing of a Memorandum of Understanding between Canada and the United States that allowed law enforcement detachments from the United States Coast Guard to operate from Canadian warships deployed on Operation Caribbe.

In January 2012, Operation Caribbe was folded into the umbrella operation, Operation Martillo, which is a joint multinational effort led by the United States to eliminate illicit trafficking in the Caribbean Sea, the eastern Pacific Ocean and the coastal areas of the Central American nations.

== Command structure ==
Subject to the operational command of Operation Martillo, any forces assigned to Operation Caribbe are under the operational direction of the United States Southern Command's Joint Interagency Task Force South. For the Canadian Armed Forces, nation command is maintained by the Canadian Joint Operations Command. The Canadian forces deployed to Operation Caribbe thus far have been warships from the Royal Canadian Navy and CP-140 Auroras and crew from the Royal Canadian Air Force.

== Mission ==
Canadian warships deployed on Operation Caribbe work in a support role, locating and tracking any vessels or targets of interest. Unless provided with law enforcement officers from the United States Coast Guard, the Canadian warships do not participate in the interdiction of those targets. The CP-140 Aurora aircraft and their crews patrol in international airspace over the Caribbean Sea, the Gulf of Mexico and the eastern Pacific Ocean to track targets of interest. They do not participate in the interdiction of suspicious targets.

== Results ==
In 2009, Calgary and were deployed to the Caribbean Sea.

In 2010, the Royal Canadian Navy vessels Algonquin, Vancouver, Toronto and Protecteur were deployed. The warships intercepted more than 29 metric tons of illegal drugs.

In 2011, Algonquin, Athabaskan, Toronto, St. John's, Kingston, Goose Bay, Moncton, Summerside, Corner Brook and seven CP-140 Auroras were deployed. St. John's aided USCGC CypressToronto in recovering 6,750 kilograms (14,880 lb) of cocaine from a scuttled vessel. Toronto handed over a small boat to the Nicaraguan Navy which contained 68 bales of cocaine.

In 2012, Iroquois, Ottawa, Goose Bay Kingston, Preserver , and CP-140 Aurora aircraft on five occasions were deployed. On 28 November 2012 Ottawa supported United States law enforcement personnel in boarding a suspicious fishing vessel. The boarding resulted in the seizure of 36 bales of cocaine weighing 1086 kilograms. Between 18 and 29 November 2012, CP-140 Aurora crews assisted in the seizure, through surveillance and detection, of 144 bales of cocaine weighing 4,300 kilograms (9,500 lb).

In 2013, Ottawa, Ville de Québec, Kingston, Summerside, Yellowknife, Edmonton, Victoria, Preserver and four CP-140 Aurora aircraft and crew were deployed. Canadian participation resulted in the assistance of seizing 5,080 kilograms (11,200 lb) of illegal drugs during the year.

In 2014, Kingston, Glace Bay, Nanaimo, Whitehorse and a CP-140 Aurora and crew have been deployed. Kingston and Glace Bay completed their six-week deployments and returned to Halifax, Nova Scotia in April 2014. While returning from the operation, Kingston had a small fire aboard, which was dealt with and no casualties were incurred. The operation resulted in the interception of 2,400 kilograms (5,300 lb) of cocaine valued at $80 million (wholesale). Summerside joined Operation Caribbe in June. Beginning in September, Athabaskan joined the operation. On 1 October, the destroyer participated in the seizure of 820 kg (1,810 lb) of cocaine valued at $24.5 million.

In January 2015, Winnipeg deployed to the eastern Pacific Ocean as part of the operation. As of 25 February, four Kingston-class vessels were deployed to the Caribbean; Whitehorse, Nanaimo, Goose Bay and Moncton. In March 2015, as part of Operation Caribbe, Goose Bay and the US frigate USS Kauffman along with Shawinigan, intercepted a vessel in the Caribbean Sea carrying 1,017 kilograms (2,242 lb) of cocaine. In early March 2015, Whitehorse, in conjunction with the US Navy and the US Coast Guard, intercepted a freighter in international waters in the eastern Pacific Ocean that led to the seizure of 5,200 kilograms (11,500 lb) of cocaine. On 10 March, Nanaimo came across fifty 1 kilogram (2.2 lb) packets of cocaine floating in the ocean. Athabaskan sailed for the Caribbean on 16 April to take part in Operation Caribbe.

In October 2015, Brandon deployed with Whitehorse off the Pacific coast of North America as part of Operation Caribbe. During their deployment, Brandon performed two seizures of smuggling vessels and Whitehorse one. In total, seven seizures were performed interdicting a total of nearly 9,800 kilograms (21,600 lb) of cocaine. The two ships returned to Canada in December.

In January 2016, Summerside and Moncton were ordered to the Caribbean as part of Operation Caribbe. In February they were joined by Edmonton and Saskatoon. On 25 March, in conjunction with the United States Navy destroyer Lassen, Edmonton intercepted drug smugglers in international waters off the coast of Central America. After being stopped the smuggling vessel attempted to dump its cargo overboard. Edmonton, working with a United States Coast Guard detachment, recovered 27 bales of cocaine equaling 650 kilograms (1,430 lb). Saskatoon moved to intercept a smuggling vessel the same day that had been reported by patrol aircraft. The boat was not found, however, Saskatoon recovered sixteen bales of cocaine totaling 640 kilograms (1,410 lb).

Nanaimo departed Esquimalt on 28 September 2017 and sailed to San Diego, California to embark a United States Coast Guard Law Enforcement Detachment (LEDET) before beginning patrols associated with Operation Caribbe in the Eastern Pacific. On 31 October, Nanaimo intercepted a suspect vessel and her LEDET unit boarded the boat, seizing 478 kg (1,054 lb) of cocaine. Nanaimo intercepted a further 750 kg (1,650 lb) of cocaine in the following weeks. In November, Moncton was in the Caribbean to take part in Operation Caribbe. On 11 November, Moncton intercepted a suspect vessel, and her embarked United States Coast Guard LEDET unit boarded the vessel, seizing 834 kg (1,839 lb) of illegal cocaine.

In 2018, Edmonton and Whitehorse deployed south into the eastern Pacific Ocean as part of Operation Caribbe. The two ships participated in the intercept and seizure of 2,856 kg (6,296 lb) of illegal drugs. Edmonton and Whitehorse returned to Esquimalt on 3 May. In mid-2018, it was reported that detainees taken aboard Canadian ships while under U.S. control were mistreated after being transferred aboard United States Coast Guard vessels before they arrived on shore.

In 2019, Whitehorse and Yellowknife both deployed to the Pacific as part of Operation Caribbe. The two ships returned to Esquimalt on 16 May, having participated in the interception of 2,657 kg (5,858 lb) of cocaine and 25 kg (55 lb) of illicit marijuana.

2023 saw 755 kg (1,664 lb), worth $50m, of cocaine intercepted by Edmonton off the coast of Mexico.

== Sources ==
- Tracy, Nicholas (2012). A Two-Edged Sword: The Navy as an Instrument of Canadian Foreign Policy. Montreal, Quebec and Kingston, Ontario: McGill-Queens University Press. ISBN 978-0-7735-4051-4.
