= HMCS Whitehorse =

Royal Canadian Navy coastal defence vessel

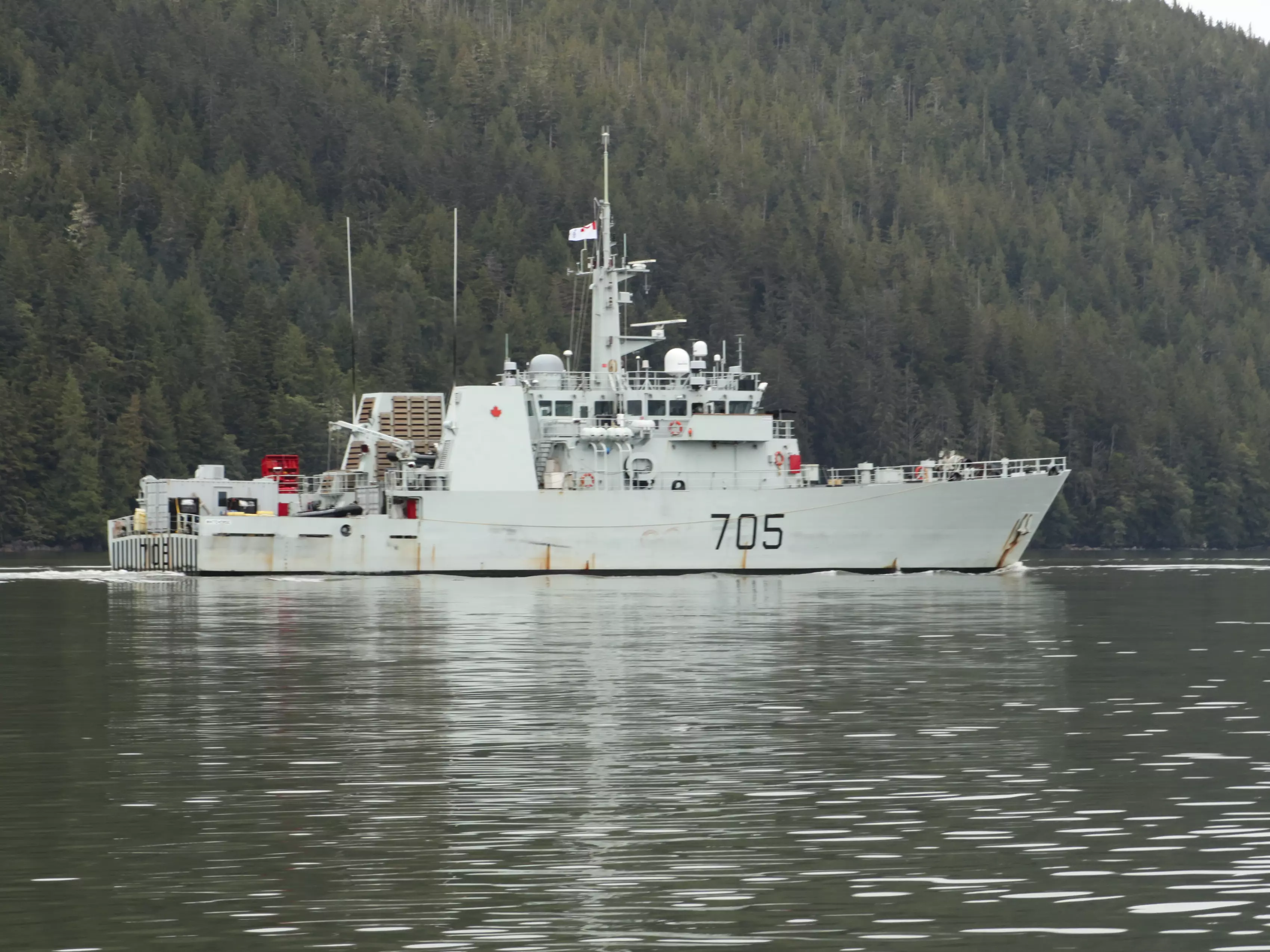
- HMCS Whitehorse on patrol in Arthur Passage

History

Canada
- Name: Whitehorse
- Namesake: Whitehorse, Yukon
- Builder: Halifax Shipyards Ltd., Halifax, Nova Scotia
- Laid down: 26 July 1996
- Launched: 24 February 1997
- Commissioned: 17 April 1998
- Decommissioned: 29 September 2025
- Identification: MMSI number: 316192000; Callsign: CGAZ; Pennant number: MM 705
- Motto: Audentes Fortuna Juvat (Fortune assists the daring)
- Status: Decommissioned
- Notes: Colours: Blue and white
- Badge: Azure three bands wavy Or over all a horse forcene Argent.

General characteristics as built
- Class & type: Kingston-class coastal defence vessel
- Displacement: 990 t (970 long tons)
- Length: 55.3 m (181 ft 5 in)
- Beam: 11.3 m (37 ft 1 in)
- Draught: 3.4 m (11 ft 2 in)
- Propulsion: 4 × Jeumont ANR-53-50 alternators, 4 × 600VAC Wärtsilä UD 23V12 diesel engines, 7.2 MW (9,700 hp); 2 × Jeumont CI 560L motors, 2,200 kW (3,000 hp); 2 × LIPS Z drive azimuth thrusters
- Speed: 15 knots (28 km/h; 17 mph)
- Range: 5,000 nmi (9,300 km; 5,800 mi) at 8 kn (15 km/h; 9.2 mph)
- Complement: 37
- Sensors & processing systems: Kelvin Hughes navigation radar (I-band); Kelvin Hughes 6000 surface search radar (E-F band); Global Positioning System; AN/SQS-511 towed side scan sonar; Remote-control Mine Hunting System (RMHS)
- Armament: 1 × Bofors 40 mm/60 Mk 5C gun; 2 × M2 machine guns

HMCS Whitehorse is a decommissioned Kingston-class coastal defence vessel that served in the Canadian Forces from 1998 to 2025. Whitehorse is the sixth ship of her class. The first vessel named for the city in Yukon, the ship was assigned to Maritime Forces Pacific (MARPAC) and was homeported at CFB Esquimalt.

== Design and description ==
The Kingston class was designed to fill the minesweeper, coastal patrol and reserve training needs of the Canadian Forces, replacing the Bay-class minesweepers, Porte-class gate vessels and Royal Canadian Mounted Police coastal launches in those roles. In order to perform these varied duties the Kingston-class vessels are designed to carry up to three 6.1-metre (20 ft) ISO containers with power hookups on the open deck aft in order to embark mission-specific payloads. The seven module types available for embarkation include four route survey, two mechanical minesweeping and one bottom inspection modules.

The Kingston class displace 990 tonnes (970 long tons) and are 55.3 metres (181 ft 5 in) long overall with a beam 11.3 metres (37 ft 1 in) and a draught of 3.4 metres (11 ft 2 in). The coastal defence vessels are powered by four Jeumont ANR-53-50 alternators coupled to four Wärtsilä UD 23V12 diesel engines creating 7.2 megawatts (9,700 hp). Two LIPS Z-drive azimuth thrusters are driven by two Jeumont CI 560L motors creating 2,200 kilowatts (3,000 hp) and the Z drives can be rotated 360°. This gives the ships a maximum speed of 15 knots (28 km/h; 17 mph) and a range of 5,000 nautical miles (9,300 km; 5,800 mi) at 8 knots (15 km/h; 9.2 mph).

The Kingston class is equipped with a Kelvin Hughes navigational radar using the I band and a Kelvin Hughes 6000 surface search radar scanning the E and F bands. The vessels carry an AN/SQS-511 towed side scan sonar for minesweeping and a Remote-control Mine Hunting System (RMHS). The vessels are equipped with one Bofors 40 mm/60 calibre Mk 5C gun and two M2 machine guns. (Note: The 60 calibre denotes the length of the gun. This means that the length of the gun barrel is 60 times the bore diameter.) The 40 mm gun was declared obsolete and removed from the vessels in 2014. Some of them ended up as museum pieces and on display at naval reserve installations across Canada. The Kingston-class coastal defence vessels have a complement of 37.

== Operational history ==
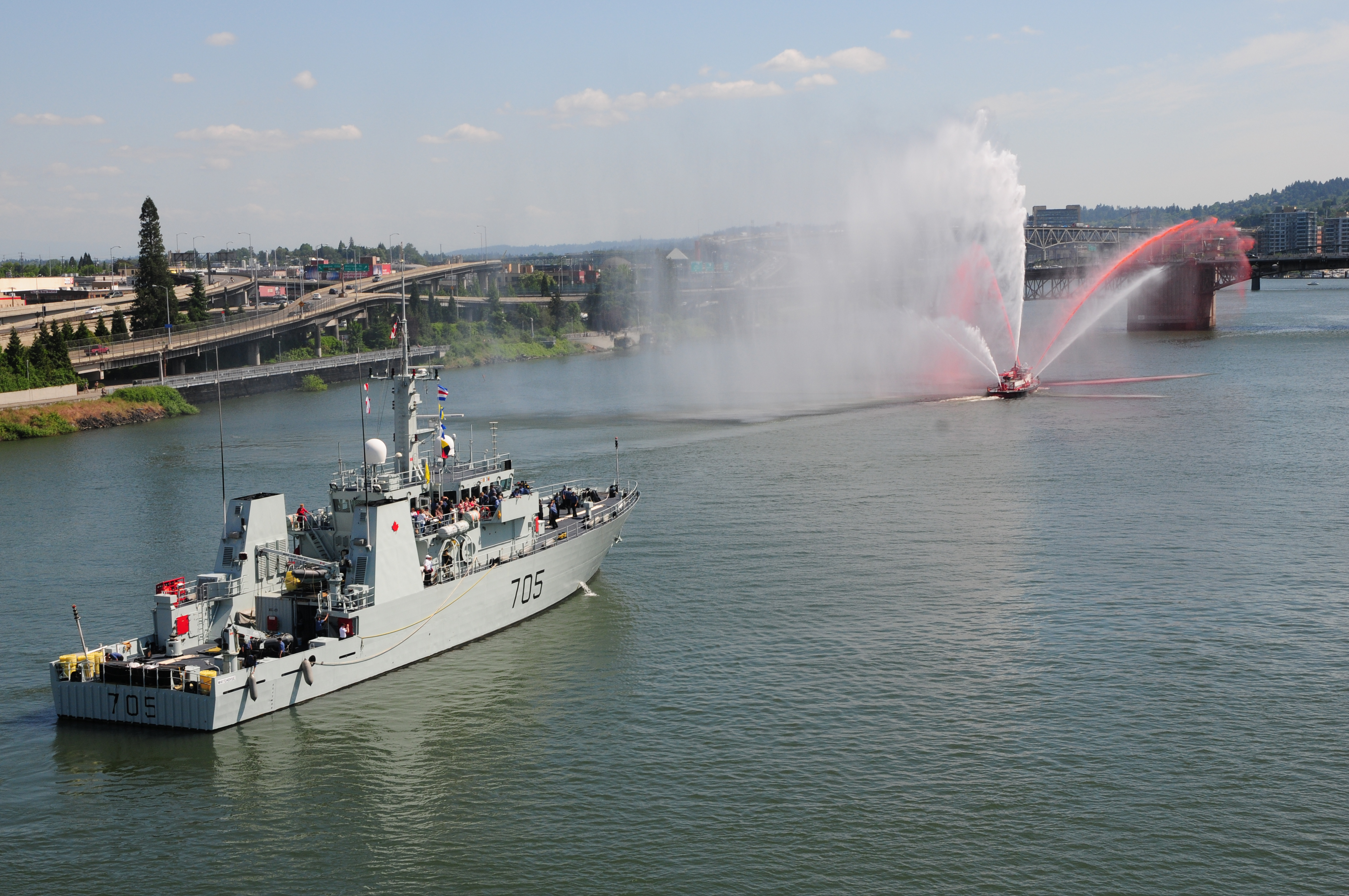
Whitehorse arriving in Portland, Oregon during 2011

Whitehorse was laid down on 26 July 1996 by Halifax Shipyards Ltd. at Halifax, Nova Scotia and was launched on 24 February 1997. The ship underwent sea trials off the Atlantic coast before transferring to the west coast of Canada in August 1997. Whitehorse was commissioned into the Canadian Forces on 17 April 1998 at Esquimalt, British Columbia and carries the hull number MM 705.

As part of Operation Caribbe, Whitehorse deployed to the eastern Pacific Ocean with sister ship, Nanaimo in February 2014. In June 2014, Whitehorse took part in the RIMPAC 2014 naval exercises off southern California. However, she was ordered to return home after allegations of misconduct, including sexual misconduct, occurred while docked in San Diego. Whitehorse is the first Canadian warship to be withdrawn from an exercise due to "reasons of conduct". The incident contributed to the imposition of tighter restrictions on the availability of alcohol on board Royal Canadian Navy warships which were announced in December 2014.

In February 2015, Whitehorse was deployed as part of Operation Caribbe. In early March 2015, Whitehorse, in conjunction with the United States Navy frigate USS Gary and the United States Coast Guard Cutter USCGC Boutwell, intercepted a freighter in international waters in the eastern Pacific Ocean that led to the seizure of 5,200 kilograms (11,500 lb) of cocaine. In late March, Whitehorse assisted the US Coast Guard in a second drug bust, this time in international waters off El Salvador. Over 600 kilograms (1,300 lb) of cocaine was seized in the operation. The coastal defence ship returned to Canada on 15 April 2015. On 10 June 2015, Whitehorse aided the stricken pleasure craft Amora Mai whose engine had caught fire six nautical miles (11 km; 6.9 mi) east of Robson Point, British Columbia. Whitehorse towed the damaged vessel to Port McNeill.

In October 2015, Whitehorse deployed with Brandon off the Pacific coast of North America as part of Operation Caribbe. During their deployment, Whitehorse performed one seizure of a smuggling vessel. In total, seven seizures were performed interdicting a total of nearly 9,800 kilograms (21,600 lb) of cocaine. The two ships returned to Canada in December. In 2018, Whitehorse deployed south into the eastern Pacific Ocean as part of Operation Caribbe alongside sister ship Edmonton. The two ships participated in the intercept and seizure of 2,856 kg (6,296 lb) of illegal drugs. Edmonton and Whitehorse returned to Esquimalt on 3 May. In June and July 2018, Whitehorse and sister ship Yellowknife were deployed off the coast of southern California while taking part in RIMPAC 2018. Whitehorse and Yellowknife both deployed to the Pacific as part of Operation Caribbe on 15 March 2019. The two ships returned to Esquimalt on 16 May, having participated in the interception of 2,657 kg (5,858 lb) of cocaine and 25 kg (55 lb) of illicit marijuana. Whitehorse deployed from Esquimalt with Nanaimo on 10 February 2020 for Operation Caribbe off western Central America for three months. The two ships were recalled from their mission early on 19 March due to the COVID-19 pandemic.

In July 2025 it was announced that HMCS Whitehorse and seven of her sister ships would be decommissioned before the end of the year. The ship was decommissioned on 29 September 2025 at Esquimalt.
