= HMCS Nanaimo (MM 702) =

Royal Canadian Navy coastal defence vessel

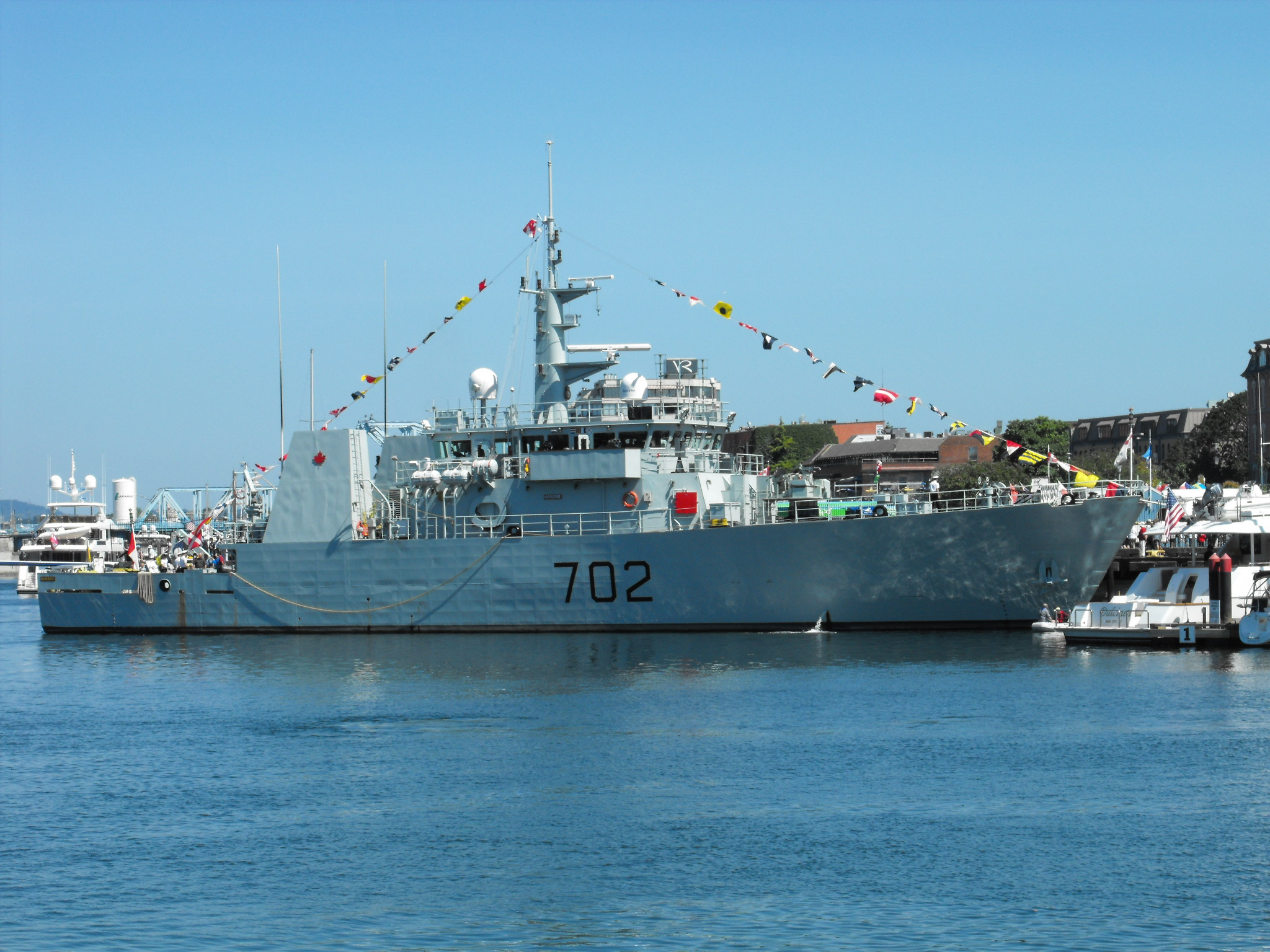
- HMCS Nanaimo alongside in Victoria Harbour for Canada Day 2009 celebrations

History

Canada
- Name: Nanaimo
- Namesake: Nanaimo, British Columbia
- Builder: Halifax Shipyards Ltd., Halifax, Nova Scotia
- Laid down: 11 August 1995
- Launched: 17 May 1996
- Commissioned: 10 May 1997
- Home port: CFB Esquimalt, relocating to CFB Halifax in 2025
- Identification: Pennant number: MM 702; MMSI number: 316113000; Callsign: CGAV
- Motto: Faith and Labour
- Honours and awards: The ship carries the battle honours won by its predecessor during World War II. Atlantic 1941–44, Gulf of St. Lawrence 1944
- Status: Active
- Notes: Colours: Gold and Blue

General characteristics
- Class & type: Kingston-class coastal defence vessel
- Displacement: 970 long tons (986 t)
- Length: 55.3 m (181 ft 5 in)
- Beam: 11.3 m (37 ft 1 in)
- Draught: 3.4 m (11 ft 2 in)
- Propulsion: 4 × Jeumont ANR-53-50 alternators, 4 × 600VAC Wärtsilä UD 23V12 diesel engines, 7.2 MW (9,700 hp); 2 × Jeumont CI 560L motors, 3,000 hp (2,200 kW); 2 × LIPS Z drive azimuth thrusters
- Speed: 15 knots (28 km/h; 17 mph)
- Range: 5,000 nmi (9,300 km; 5,800 mi) at 8 kn (15 km/h; 9.2 mph)
- Complement: 37
- Sensors & processing systems: Kelvin Hughes navigation radar (I-band); Kelvin Hughes 6000 surface search radar (E-F band); Global Positioning System; AN/SQS-511 towed side scan sonar; Remote-control Mine Hunting System (RMHS)
- Armament: 1 × Bofors 40 mm/60 Mk 5C gun (removed from the class); 2 × M2 machine guns

HMCS Nanaimo is a Kingston-class coastal defence vessel that has served in the Canadian Forces and Royal Canadian Navy since 1997. Nanaimo is the third ship of her class. She is the second vessel to use the designation HMCS Nanaimo. She was assigned to Joint Task Force Pacific (formerly Maritime Forces Pacific) and homeported at CFB Esquimalt. However, it is anticipated that she will relocate to CFB Halifax in 2025.

== Design and description ==
The Kingston class was designed to fill the minesweeper, coastal patrol and reserve training needs of the Canadian Forces, replacing the Bay-class minesweepers, Porte-class gate vessels and Royal Canadian Mounted Police coastal launches in those roles. In order to perform these varied duties the Kingston-class vessels are designed to carry up to three 6.1-metre (20 ft) ISO containers with power hookups on the open deck aft in order to embark mission-specific payloads. The seven module types available for embarkation include four route survey, two mechanical minesweeping and one bottom inspection modules.

The Kingston class displace 970 long tons (986 t) and are 55.3 metres (181 ft 5 in) long overall with a beam 11.3 metres (37 ft 1 in) and a draught of 3.4 metres (11 ft 2 in). The coastal defence vessels are powered by four Jeumont ANR-53-50 alternators coupled to four Wärtsilä UD 23V12 diesel engines creating 7.2 megawatts (9,700 hp). Two LIPS Z-drive azimuth thrusters are driven by two Jeumont CI 560L motors creating 2,200 kilowatts (3,000 hp) and the Z drives can be rotated 360°. This gives the ships a maximum speed of 15 knots (28 km/h; 17 mph) and a range of 5,000 nautical miles (9,300 km; 5,800 mi) at 8 knots (15 km/h; 9.2 mph).

The Kingston class is equipped with a Kelvin Hughes navigational radar using the I band and a Kelvin Hughes 6000 surface search radar scanning the E and F bands. The vessels carry an AN/SQS-511 towed side scan sonar for minesweeping and a Remote-control Mine Hunting System (RMHS). The vessels are equipped with one Bofors 40 mm/60 calibre Mk 5C gun and two M2 machine guns. (Note: The 60 calibre denotes the length of the gun. This means that the length of the gun barrel is 60 times the bore diameter.) The Kingston-class coastal defence vessels have a complement of 37. The 40 mm gun was declared obsolete and removed from the vessels in 2014. Some of them ended up as museum pieces and on display at naval reserve installations across Canada.

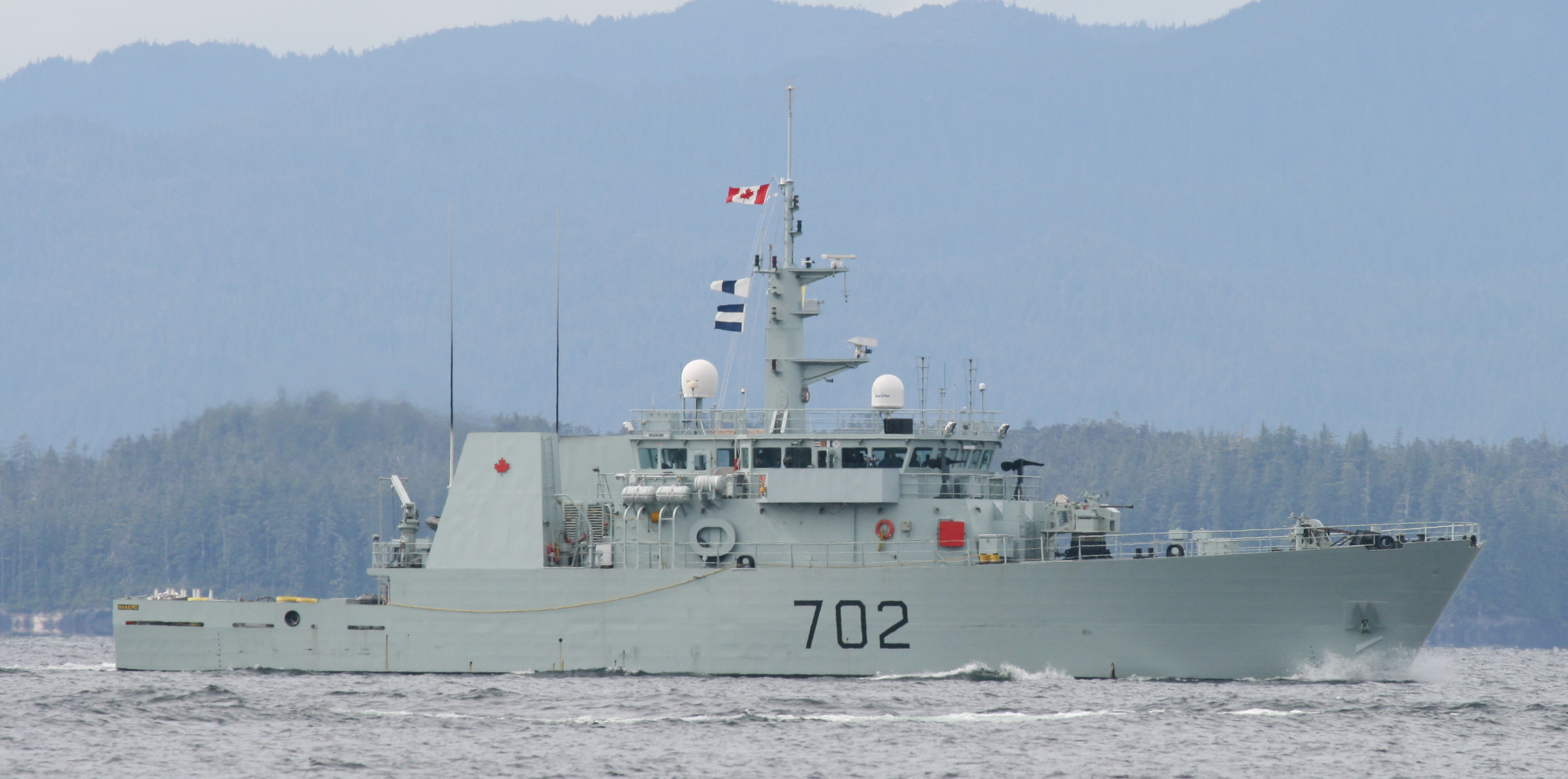
Underway off Vancouver Island in 2007

== Operational history ==
The ship's keel was laid down on 11 August 1995 by Halifax Shipyards Ltd. at Halifax, Nova Scotia and was launched on 17 May 1996. Nanaimo was commissioned into the Canadian Forces on 10 May 1997 at Nanaimo, British Columbia and carries the hull number MM 702.

After commissioning, Nanaimo was assigned to the west coast. In June 2002, she participated in the naval exercise RIMPAC 2002. As part of Operation Caribbe, she patrolled the eastern Pacific Ocean with sister ship Whitehorse in February 2014. The coastal defence vessel once again participated in RIMPAC in 2014, as part of the units operating off Southern California. After the 40 mm gun was declared obsolete in 2014, Nanaimo's model was donated to the Vancouver Island Military Museum and positioned near the museum entrance.

In February 2015, Nanaimo was deployed as part of Operation Caribbe. On 10 March, Nanaimo came across 50 1 kilogram (2.2 lb) packets of cocaine floating in the ocean. She returned to Canada on 15 April 2015. Nanaimo departed Esquimalt on 28 September 2017 and sailed to San Diego, California to embark a United States Coast Guard Law Enforcement Detachment (LEDET) before beginning patrols associated with Operation Caribbe in the Eastern Pacific on 16 October. On 31 October, Nanaimo intercepted a suspect vessel and her LEDET unit boarded the boat, seizing 478 kg (1,054 lb) of cocaine. Nanaimo intercepted a further 750 kg (1,650 lb) of cocaine in the following weeks. Nanaimo returned to Esquimalt on 15 December.

In November 2018, Nanaimo and sister ship Edmonton departed for the Eastern Pacific Ocean to participate in Operation Caribbe in November 2018. The two ships returned to Esquimalt on 17 December, with Edmonton successfully intercepting a drug shipment. Nanaimo deployed from Esquimalt with Whitehorse on 10 February 2020 for Operation Caribbe off western Central America for three months. The two ships were recalled from their mission early on 19 March due to the COVID-19 pandemic.

HMCS Nanaimo is scheduled to decommission in 2028.
