= HMCS Brandon (MM 710) =

Royal Canadian Navy coastal defence vessel

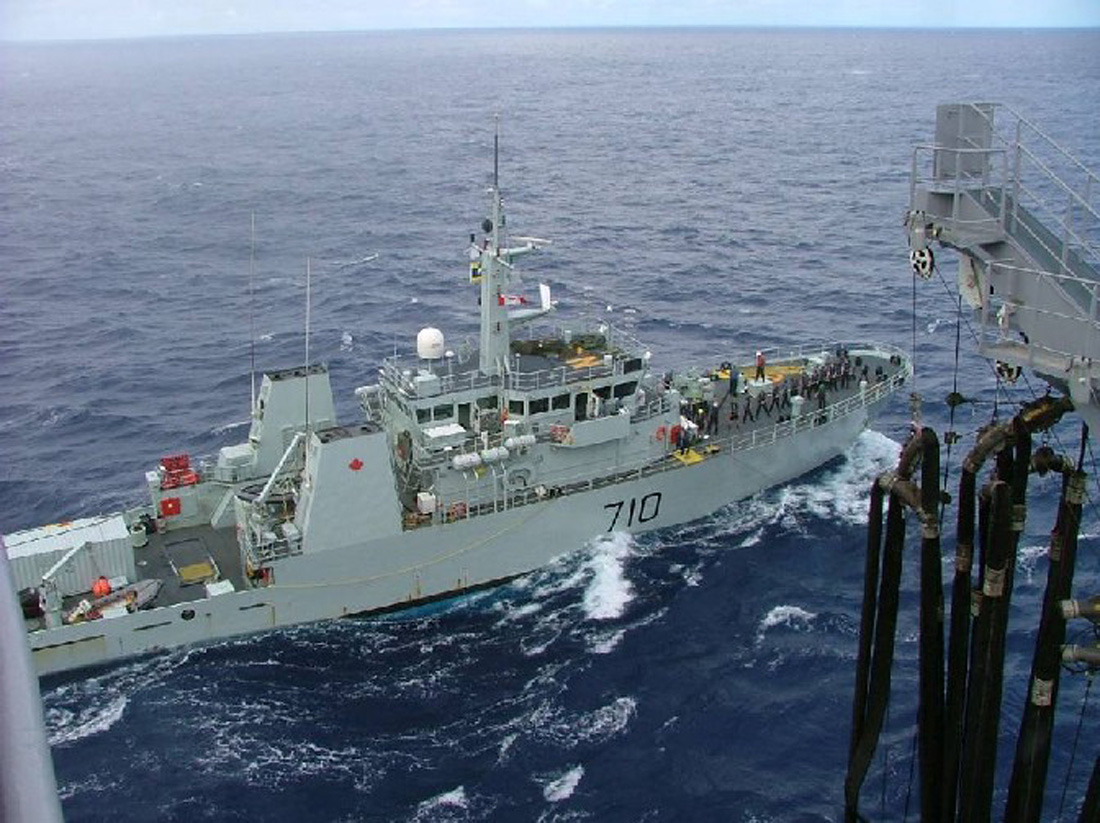
- HMCS Brandon in July 2004

History

Canada
- Name: Brandon
- Namesake: Brandon, Manitoba
- Builder: Halifax Shipyards Ltd., Halifax, Nova Scotia
- Laid down: 6 December 1997
- Launched: 10 July 1998
- Commissioned: 5 June 1999
- Decommissioned: 29 September 2025
- Home port: CFB Esquimalt
- Identification: Pennant number: MM 710; MMSI number: 316267000; Callsign: CGJI
- Honours and awards: Atlantic, 1941–45; Gulf of St. Lawrence, 1944
- Status: Decommissioned

General characteristics
- Class & type: Kingston-class coastal defence vessel
- Displacement: 970 long tons (986 t)
- Length: 55.3 m (181 ft 5 in)
- Beam: 11.3 m (37 ft 1 in)
- Draught: 3.4 m (11 ft 2 in)
- Propulsion: 4 × Jeumont ANR-53-50 alternators, 4 × 600VAC Wärtsilä UD 23V12 diesel engines, 7.2 MW (9,700 hp); 2 × Jeumont CI 560L motors, 3,000 hp (2,200 kW); 2 × LIPS Z drive azimuth thrusters
- Speed: 15 knots (28 km/h; 17 mph)
- Range: 5,000 nmi (9,300 km; 5,800 mi) at 8 kn (15 km/h; 9.2 mph)
- Complement: 37
- Sensors & processing systems: Kelvin Hughes navigation radar (I-band); Kelvin Hughes 6000 surface search radar (E-F band); Global Positioning System; AN/SQS-511 towed side scan sonar; Remote-control Mine Hunting System (RMHS)
- Armament: 1 × Bofors 40 mm/60 Mk 5C gun; 2 × M2 machine guns

HMCS Brandon is a decommissioned Kingston-class coastal defence vessel that served in the Canadian Forces from 1999 to 2025. Brandon was the eleventh ship of her class. She is the second vessel to use the name HMCS Brandon. Brandon was assigned to Maritime Forces Pacific (MARPAC) and was homeported at CFB Esquimalt.

== Design and description ==
The Kingston class was designed to fill the minesweeper, coastal patrol and reserve training needs of the Canadian Forces, replacing the Bay-class minesweepers, Porte-class gate vessels and Royal Canadian Mounted Police coastal launches in those roles. In order to perform these varied duties the Kingston-class vessels are designed to carry up to three 6.1-metre (20 ft) ISO containers with power hookups on the open deck aft in order to embark mission-specific payloads. The seven module types available for embarkation include four route survey, two mechanical minesweeping and one bottom inspection modules.

The Kingston class displace 970 long tons (986 t) and are 55.3 metres (181 ft 5 in) long overall with a beam 11.3 metres (37 ft 1 in) and a draught of 3.4 metres (11 ft 2 in). The coastal defence vessels are powered by four Jeumont ANR-53-50 alternators coupled to four Wärtsilä UD 23V12 diesel engines creating 7.2 megawatts (9,700 hp). Two LIPS Z-drive azimuth thrusters are driven by two Jeumont CI 560L motors creating 3,000 horsepower (2,200 kW) and the Z drives can be rotated 360°. This gives the ships a maximum speed of 15 knots (28 km/h; 17 mph) and a range of 5,000 nautical miles (9,300 km; 5,800 mi) at 8 knots (15 km/h; 9.2 mph).

The Kingston class is equipped with a Kelvin Hughes navigational radar using the I band and a Kelvin Hughes 6000 surface search radar scanning the E and F bands. The vessels carry an AN/SQS-511 towed side scan sonar for minesweeping and a Remote-control Mine Hunting System (RMHS). The vessels are equipped with one Bofors 40 mm/60 calibre Mk 5C gun and two M2 machine guns. (Note: The 60 calibre denotes the length of the gun. This means that the length of the gun barrel is 60 times the bore diameter.) The 40 mm gun was declared obsolete and removed from the vessels in 2014. Some of them ended up as museum pieces and on display at naval reserve installations across Canada. The Kingston-class coastal defence vessels have a complement of 37.

== Service history ==
Brandon's keel was laid down on 6 December 1997 by Halifax Shipyards Ltd. at Halifax, Nova Scotia and was launched on 10 July 1998. The ship transferred to the west coast, arriving at CFB Esquimalt on 3 May 1999. Brandon was commissioned into the Canadian Forces on 5 June 1999 at Esquimalt, British Columbia and carries the hull number MM 710.

Brandon, accompanied by the frigates Winnipeg, Calgary and sister ship Yellowknife, departed in October 2014 to take part in San Francisco Fleet Week and the Task Group Exercise with the United States Navy in American coastal waters. Following those exercises, Brandon and Yellowknife deployed as part of Operation Caribbe, completing their tour on 4 December.

In October 2015, Brandon deployed with Whitehorse off the Pacific coast of North America as part of Operation Caribbe. During their deployment, Brandon performed two seizures of smuggling vessels. In total, seven seizures were performed interdicting a total of nearly 9,800 kilograms (21,600 lb) of cocaine. The two ships returned to Canada in December. On 6 October 2016, Brandon and Edmonton left Esquimalt to participate in Operation Caribbe along the Pacific coast. On 5 November, Brandon was directed to intercept a suspected fishing vessel dumping cargo into the water by a United States Coast Guard aircraft. The ship sent two RHIBs to recover the cargo while Brandon went after the smugglers. The smugglers got away, but 700 kg (1,500 lb) of cocaine was recovered. Brandon and Edmonton returned to Esquimalt on 16 December.

Beginning in 2017, Brandon underwent a two-year refit at Esquimalt. The vessel returned to service in July 2019. From February to May 2021, Brandon and sister ship Saskatoon deployed as part of Operation Caribbe, taking part in the interception of illicit drugs off the coasts of the Pacific coast of Mexico and Central America. In 2022, Brandon was one of the RCN vessels sent to take part in the multinational naval exercise RIMPAC 2022.

In July 2025 it was announced that HMCS Brandon and seven of her sister ships would be decommissioned before the end of the year. The ship was decommissioned on 29 September 2025 at Esquimalt.
