= HMCS Calgary (FFH 335) =

Royal Canadian Navy frigate

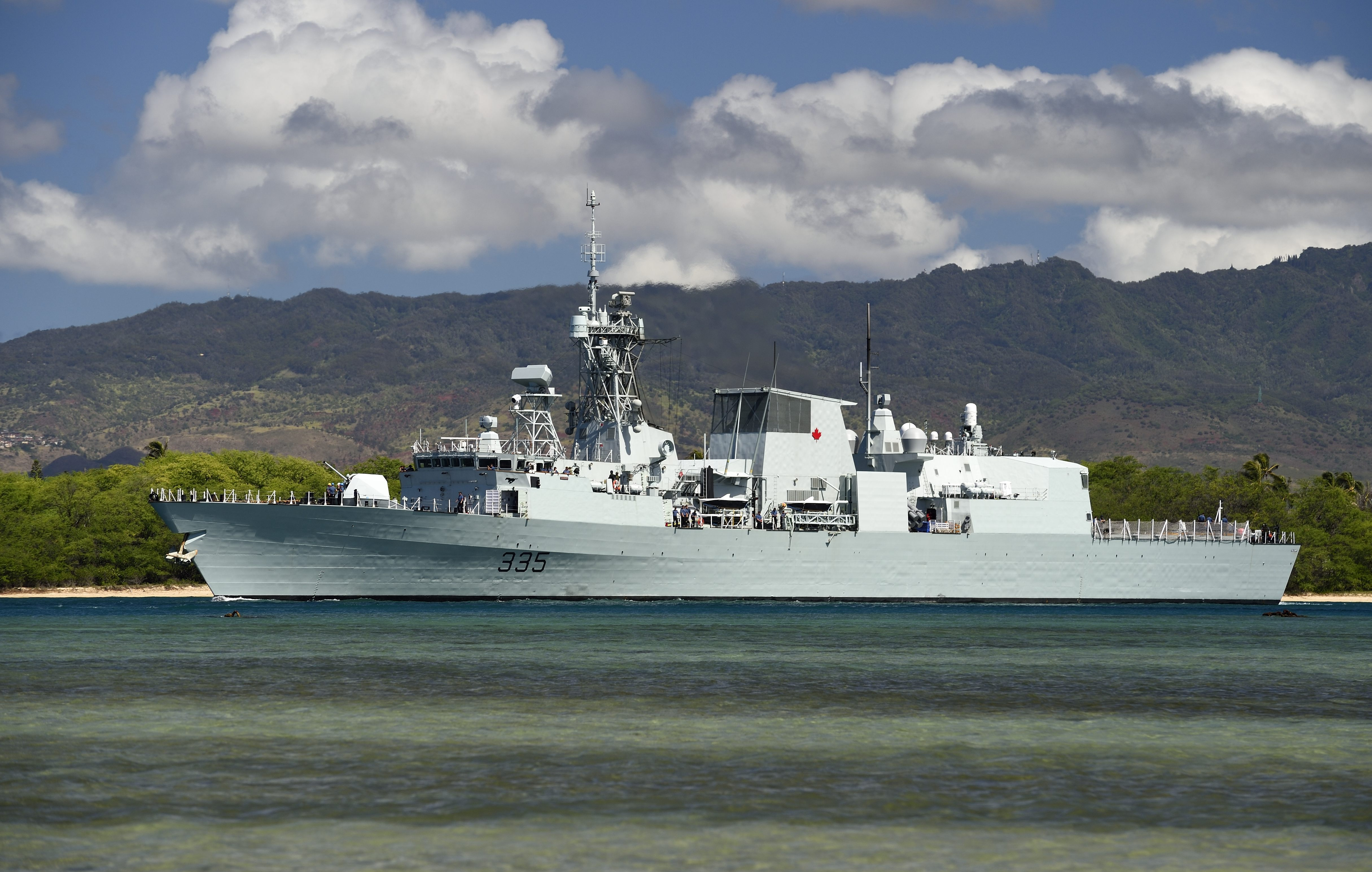
- HMCS Calgary in 2014

History

Canada
- Name: Calgary
- Namesake: Calgary, Alberta
- Builder: MIL Davie Shipbuilding, Lévis
- Laid down: 15 June 1991
- Launched: 28 August 1992
- Commissioned: 12 May 1995
- Refit: HCM/FELEX June 2011 – June 2012
- Home port: CFB Esquimalt
- Identification: MMSI number: 316158000; Callsign: CGAF; Pennant number: 335
- Motto: "Onward"
- Honours and awards: Atlantic, 1942–45; Biscay, 1943; Normandy, 1944; English Channel, 1944–45; North Sea, 1945; Arabian Sea
- Status: in active service
- Badge: Or, a bend wavy azure charged with a like bendlet argent. In front across the centre of a bow stringed fess-wise, and arrow point upwards in pale, both sable.

General characteristics
- Class & type: Halifax-class frigate
- Displacement: 3,995 tonnes (light); 4,795 tonnes (operational); 5,032 tonnes (deep load)
- Length: 134.2 m (440 ft 3 in)
- Beam: 16.5 m (54 ft 2 in)
- Draught: 7.1 m (23 ft 4 in)
- Propulsion: 2 × LM2500 gas turbines; 1 × SEMT Pielstick diesel engine
- Speed: 30 knots (56 km/h; 35 mph)
- Range: 9,500 nmi (17,600 km; 10,900 mi)
- Complement: 255 (including air detachment)
- Armament: 24 × Honeywell Mk 46 torpedoes; 16 × Evolved Sea-Sparrow SAM; 8 × RGM-84 Harpoon SSM; 1 × 57 mm Bofors MkIII gun; 1 × 20 mm Vulcan Phalanx CIWS; 6 × .50 caliber machine guns
- Aircraft carried: 1 × CH-148 Cyclone

HMCS Calgary is a Halifax-class frigate that has served in the Canadian Forces and Royal Canadian Navy since 1995. Calgary is the sixth vessel in her class and the second vessel to carry the name Calgary. She was built as part of the Canadian Patrol Frigate Project. Calgary began the FELEX (Frigate Equipment Life Extension) refit in June 2012. She is assigned to Maritime Forces Pacific (MARPAC) and is homeported at CFB Esquimalt. Calgary serves on MARPAC missions protecting Canada's sovereignty in the Pacific Ocean and enforcing Canadian laws in its territorial sea and exclusive economic zone.

== Description and design ==
The Halifax-class frigates were ordered by the Canadian Forces in 1977 as a replacement for the St. Laurent, Restigouche, Mackenzie, and Annapolis classes of destroyer escorts, which were all tasked with anti-submarine warfare. In July 1983, the federal government approved the budget for the design and construction of the first batch of six new frigates of which Calgary was a part, out of twelve that were eventually built. To reflect the changing long-term strategy of the Navy during the 1980s and 1990s, the Halifax-class frigates were designed as a general purpose warship with particular focus on anti-submarine capabilities.

As built, the Halifax-class vessels displaced 4,750 long tons (4,830 t) and were 134.65 metres (441 ft 9 in) long overall and 124.49 metres (408 ft 5 in) between perpendiculars with a beam of 16.36 metres (53 ft 8 in) and a draught of 4.98 metres (16 ft 4 in). That made them slightly larger than the Iroquois-class destroyers. The vessels are propelled by two shafts with Escher Wyss controllable pitch propellers driven by a CODOG system of two General Electric LM2500 gas turbines, generating 47,500 shaft horsepower (35,400 kW) and one SEMT Pielstick 20 PA6 V 280 diesel engine, generating 8,800 shaft horsepower (6,600 kW).

This gives the frigates a maximum speed of 29 knots (54 km/h; 33 mph) and a range of 7,000 nautical miles (13,000 km; 8,100 mi) at 15 knots (28 km/h; 17 mph) while using their diesel engines. Using their gas turbines, the ships have a range of 3,930 nautical miles (7,280 km; 4,520 mi) at 18 knots (33 km/h; 21 mph). The Halifax class have a complement of 198 naval personnel of which 17 are officers and 17 aircrew of which 8 are officers.

=== Armament and aircraft ===
As built the Halifax-class vessels deployed the CH-124 Sea King helicopter, which acted in concert with shipboard sensors to seek out and destroy submarines at long distances from the ships. The ships have a helicopter deck fitted with a "bear trap" system allowing the launch and recovery of helicopters in up to sea state 6. The Halifax class also carries a close-in anti-submarine weapon in the form of the Mark 46 torpedo, launched from twin Mark 32 Mod 9 torpedo tubes in launcher compartments either side of the forward end of the helicopter hangar.

As built, the anti-shipping role is supported by the RGM-84 Harpoon Block 1C surface-to-surface missile, mounted in two quadruple launch tubes at the main deck level between the funnel and the helicopter hangar. For anti-aircraft self-defence the ships are armed with the Sea Sparrow vertical launch surface-to-air missile in two Mk 48 Mod 0 eight-cell launchers placed to port and starboard of the funnel. The vessels carry 16 missiles. A Raytheon/General Dynamics Phalanx Mark 15 Mod 21 Close-In Weapon System (CIWS) is mounted on top of the helicopter hangar for "last-ditch" defence against targets that evade the Sea Sparrow.

As built, the main gun on the forecastle is a 57 mm (2.2 in)/70 calibre Mark 2 gun from Bofors. (Note: The 70 calibre denotes the length of the gun. This means that the length of the gun barrel is 70 times the bore diameter.) The gun is capable of firing 2.4-kilogram (5.3 lb) shells at a rate of 220 rounds per minute to a range of more than 17 kilometres (11 mi).

=== Countermeasures and sensors ===
As built, the decoy system comprises two BAE Systems Shield Mark 2 decoy launchers which fire chaff to 2 kilometres (1.2 mi) and infrared rockets to 169 metres (185 yd) in distraction, confusion and centroid seduction modes. The torpedo decoy is the AN/SLQ-25A Nixie towed acoustic decoy from Argon ST. The ship's radar warning receiver, the CANEWS (Canadian Electronic Warfare System), SLQ-501, and the radar jammer, SLQ-505, were developed by Thorn and Lockheed Martin Canada.

Two Thales Nederland (formerly Signaal) SPG-503 (STIR 1.8) fire control radars are installed one on the bridge-top and one on a raised platform on the forward end of the helicopter hangar. The ship is also fitted with Raytheon AN/SPS-49(V)5 long-range active air search radar operating in C and D bands, Ericsson HC150 Sea Giraffe medium-range air and surface search radar operating in G and H bands, and a Kelvin Hughes Type 1007 I-band navigation radar. The sonar suite includes the CANTASS Canadian Towed Array and GD-C AN/SQS-510 hull mounted sonar and incorporates an acoustic range prediction system. The sonobuoy processing system is the GD-C AN/UYS-503.

=== Modernization ===
The Halifax class underwent a modernization program, known as the Halifax Class Modernization (HCM) program, in order to update the frigates' capabilities in combatting modern smaller, faster and more mobile threats. This involved upgrading the command and control, radar, communications, electronic warfare and armament systems. Further improvements, such as modifying the vessel to accommodate the new Sikorsky CH-148 Cyclone helicopter and satellite links will be done separately from the main FELEX program.

The FELEX program comprised upgrading the combat systems integration to CMS330. The SPS-49 2D long range air search radar was replaced by the Thales Nederland SMART-S Mk 2 E/F-band 3D surveillance radar, and the two STIR 1.8 fire control radars were replaced by a pair of Saab Ceros 200 fire control radars. A Telephonics IFF Mode 5/S interrogator was installed and the Elisra NS9003A-V2HC ESM system replaced the SLQ-501 CANEWS. An IBM multi-link (Link 11, Link 16 and Link 22 enabled) datalink processing system was installed along with two Raytheon Anschütz Pathfinder Mk II navigation radars. Furthermore, Rheinmetall's Multi-Ammunition Soft kill System (MASS), known as MASS DUERAS was introduced to replace the Plessey Shield decoy system. The existing 57 mm Mk 2 guns were upgraded to the Mk 3 standard and the Harpoon missiles were improved to Block II levels, the Phalanx CIWS was upgraded to Block 1B and the obsolete Sea Sparrow system was replaced by the Evolved Sea Sparrow Missile.

== Operational history ==
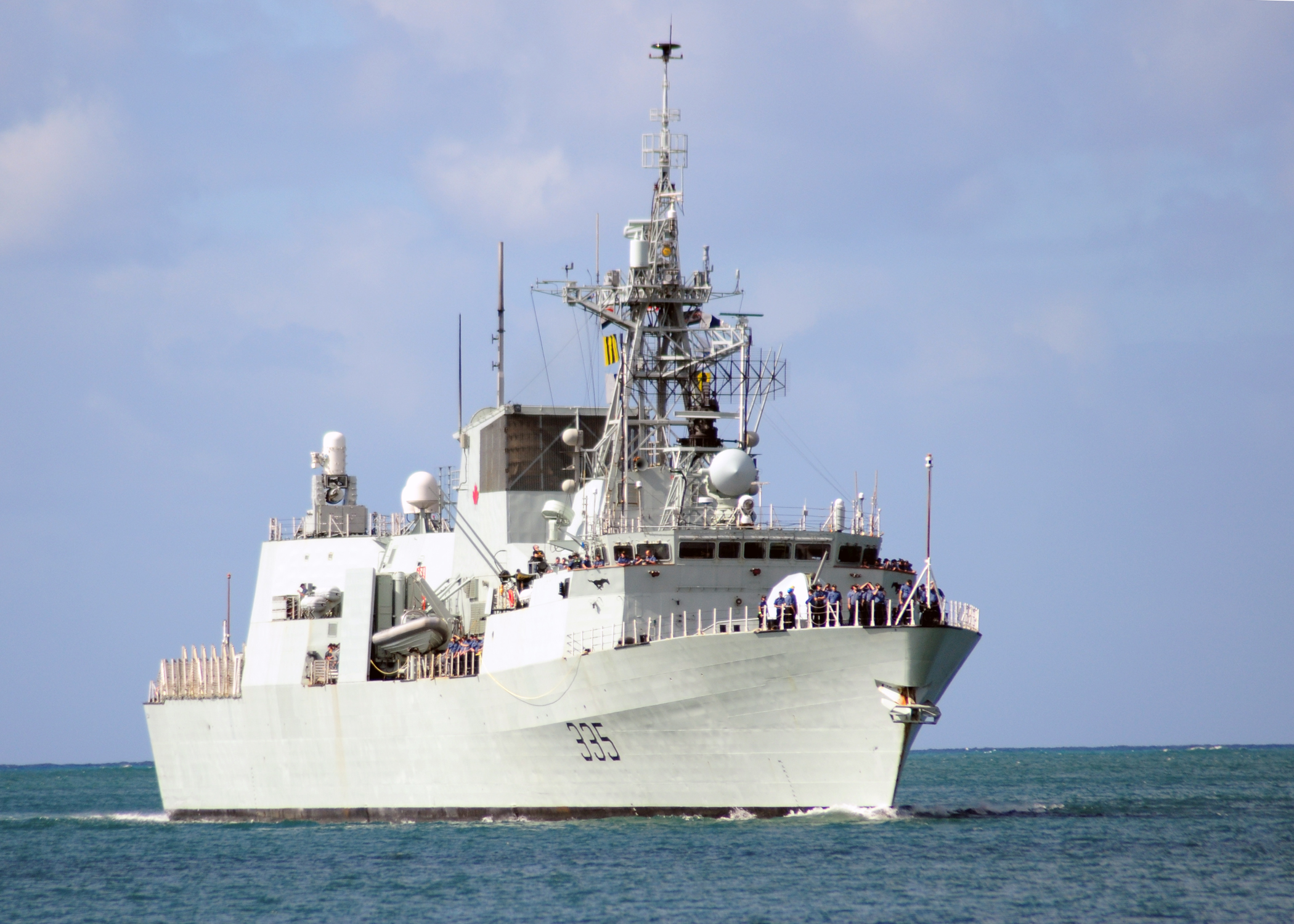
Calgary pulls into Joint Base Pearl Harbor-Hickam, Hawaii, to support Rim of the Pacific (RIMPAC) 2010 exercises

Calgary was laid down on 15 June 1991 by MIL Davie Shipbuilding at Lauzon and launched on 28 August 1992. She was commissioned into the Canadian Forces on 12 May 1995 and carries the hull classification symbol 335.

On 10 July 1995, Calgary was sent to the Persian Gulf as part of the force used to enforce sanctions on Iraq, her mission lasting until December of that year. While en route home, she assisted the sinking bulk carrier Mount Olympus. She rescued all 30 members of the crew, taking them to the freighter Rodopi. Calgary deployed as part of the NATO blockade of Yugoslavia in the Adriatic Sea.

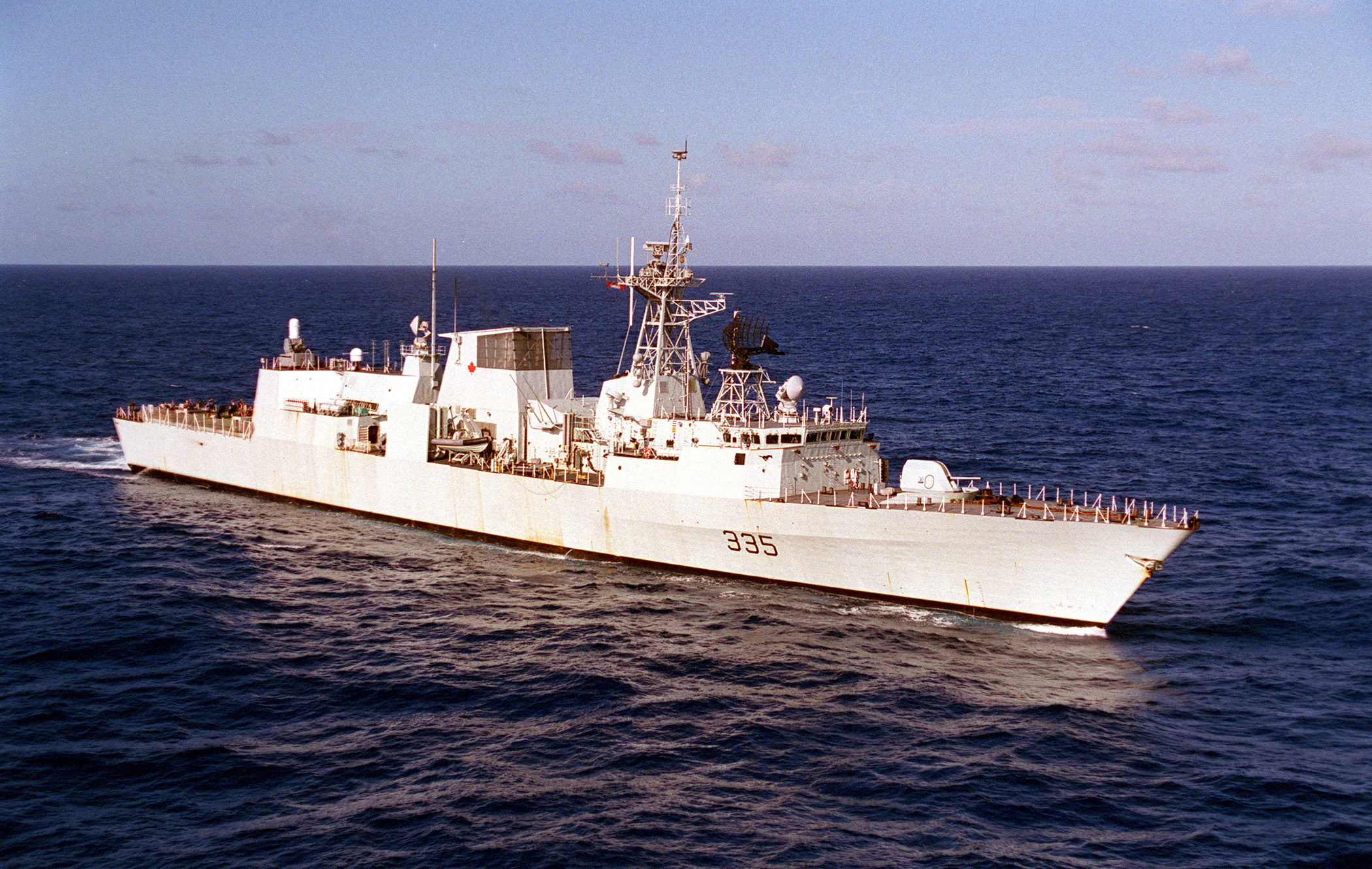
Calgary deployed on Exercise "Tandem Thrust" in 1999

In 1999, while participating in the naval exercise "Tandem Thrust", Calgary suffered the breakdown of one of her diesel generators. The following year the frigate redeployed to the Persian Gulf, once again as part of the group enforcing sanctions against Iraq, replacing sister ship Regina. Calgary sailed to the Persian Gulf in 2003 as part of Operation Apollo. During her time in theatre, the ship conducted 24 boardings of suspect vessels. Calgary was the last ship to deploy as part of the operation, which ended with the ship's departure on 1 November 2003.

In 2008, with the auxiliary vessel Protecteur and the destroyer Iroquois, Calgary sailed to the Horn of Africa to join the Combined Task Force 150. Calgary spent her time performing maritime interdiction of people and drug smuggling and stopping piracy between Somalia and Yemen. In 2009, Calgary sailed to the Caribbean Sea to take part in Operation Caribbe, the Canadian drug-interdiction operation.

On 6 June 2011 Calgary was turned over to Seaspan Marine Corporation's Victoria Shipyards, to start an 18-month mid-life upgrading and modernization. Calgary was returned to the Royal Canadian Navy from Victoria Shipyards on 1 June 2012 and as of fall 2013 conducted sea acceptance trials.

Calgary participated in RIMPAC 2014 in June 2014, the first time that China will participate in the operation. Calgary, accompanied by Winnipeg, Yellowknife and Brandon, departed in October 2014 to take part in San Francisco Fleet Week and the Task Group Exercise (TGEX) with the US Navy in American coastal waters.

In October 2015, Calgary, along with Chicoutimi and Vancouver, participated in the TGEX naval exercise. In June 2016, Calgary, Vancouver, Saskatoon and Yellowknife sailed from Esquimalt to participate in the RIMPAC naval exercise.

On 25 February 2018, 10,000–20,000 litres (2,600–5,300 US gal) (Note: This was initially reported as 30,000 litres (7,925 US gal) of oil fuel.) of fuel was spilled from the ship while Calgary was sailing in the Georgia Strait between Vancouver Island and the mainland. Calgary circled back on her path and aircraft searched along the course for an oil sheen. The Western Canadian Marine Response was alerted and the Canadian Coast Guard and Environment Canada were also responded to the situation. The Royal Canadian Navy deployed four of its Orca-class patrol vessels and one CP-140A Aurora aircraft to search for signs of oil spill, but found none. Environment Canada believed this was due to inclement weather which prevented the oil from reaching shore and caused it to break up in the ocean. On 30 July 2018, Calgary departed Esquimalt for a five-month deployment to the Pacific Ocean taking part in naval exercises with Japan, South Korea, New Zealand and Australia. The ship was joined by the Canadian auxiliary ship MV Asterix in the Western Pacific, visiting Da Nang, Vietnam in September. Calgary was deployed in naval exercises in the South China Sea, East China Sea, visiting Japan and Australia. Calgary was assigned duties enforcing United Nations resolutions against North Korea. After a year at sea, Asterix and Calgary returned to Canada at CFB Esquimalt on 18 December 2018.

On 23 April 2021, while operating off the coast of Oman as part of CTF 150, Calgary intercepted a vessel suspected of smuggling and recovered 1,286 kg (2,835 lb) of heroin. Less than 24 hours later, the ship intercepted a second vessel and recovered 360 kg (790 lb) of methamphetamine.The combined total worth is over $23.22 million. The frigate took part in the multinational naval exercise Talisman Sabre alongside other Pacific Rim nations in July off Australia. The ship returned to Canada on 31 August.

== Command team ==
- Commanding officer: Commander Adriano Lozer
- Executive officer: Lieutenant Commander Andrew Berry
- Coxswain: Chief Petty Officer First Class Armand Reelick
