= HMCS Edmonton =

Royal Canadian Navy coastal defence vessel

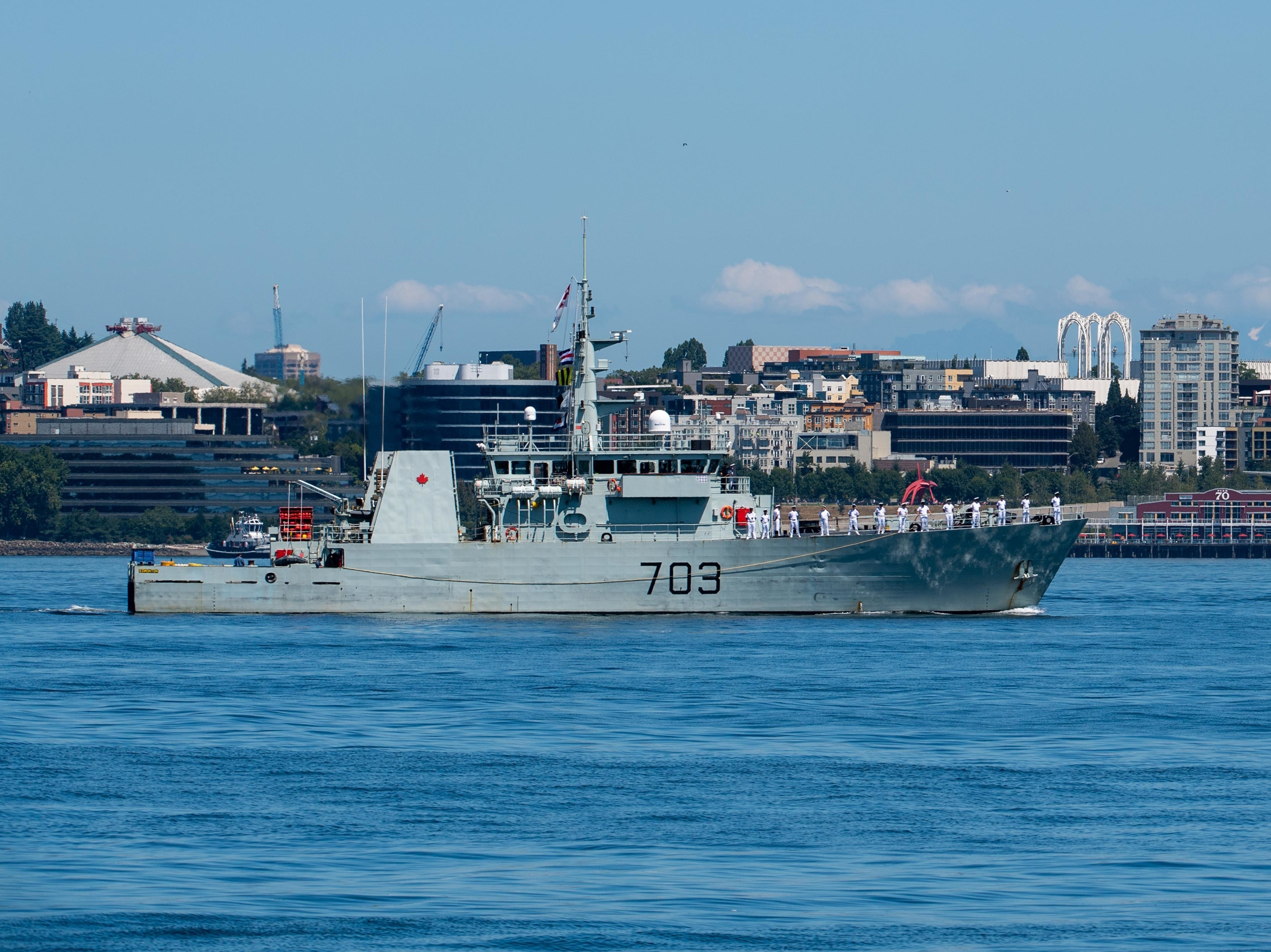
- HMCS Edmonton in 2019

History

Canada
- Name: Edmonton
- Namesake: Edmonton, Alberta
- Builder: Halifax Shipyards Ltd., Halifax
- Laid down: 8 December 1995
- Launched: 31 October 1996
- Commissioned: 21 June 1997
- Home port: CFB Halifax
- Identification: Pennant number: MM 703; MMSI number: 316141000; Callsign: CGAW
- Motto: Industria ditat ("Industry enriches")
- Status: Active
- Notes: Colours: gold and black

General characteristics
- Class & type: Kingston-class coastal defence vessel
- Displacement: 970 long tons (986 t)
- Length: 55.3 m (181 ft 5.2 in)
- Beam: 11.3 m (37 ft 0.9 in)
- Draught: 3.4 m (11 ft 1.9 in)
- Propulsion: 4 × Jeumont ANR-53-50 alternators, 4 × 600VAC Wärtsilä UD 23V12 diesel engines, 7.2 MW (9,655 hp); 2 × Jeumont CI 560L motors, 3,000 hp (2,200 kW); 2 × LIPS Z drive azimuth thrusters
- Speed: 15 knots (28 km/h)
- Range: 5,000 nmi (9,300 km; 5,800 mi) at 8 kn (15 km/h; 9.2 mph)
- Complement: 33 – up to 47 with Accommodations payload embarked
- Sensors & processing systems: Sperry Marine Bridgemaster "E" radars (one I band, the other E/F band); Global Positioning System; Sperry Marine NAVIGAT X Mk1 Gyrocompasses (2); Sperry Marine NAVITWIN IV Heading Management System; AN/SQS-511 towed side scan sonar; Remote-control Mine Hunting System (RMHS)
- Armament: 1 × Bofors 40 mm/60 Mk 5C gun (no longer in service); 2 × M2 machine guns; 1 × 12.7 mm Nanuk RWS (sea trials, IOC ≈2017/18)

HMCS Edmonton is a Kingston-class coastal defence vessel that has served in the Canadian Forces since 1997. Edmonton is the fourth ship of its class, all of which were built for the Maritime Coastal Defence Vessel Project. The ship is the first vessel to use the designation HMCS Edmonton. The ship has transferred to the Atlantic and is homeported at CFB Halifax.

== Design and description ==
The Kingston class was designed to fill the minesweeper, coastal patrol and reserve training needs of the Canadian Forces, replacing the Bay-class minesweepers, Porte-class gate vessels and Royal Canadian Mounted Police coastal launches in those roles. In order to perform these varied duties the Kingston-class vessels are designed to carry up to three 6.1-metre (20 ft) ISO containers with power hookups on the open deck aft in order to embark mission-specific payloads. The seven module types available for embarkation include four route survey, two mechanical minesweeping and one bottom inspection modules.

The Kingston class displace 970 long tons (986 t) and are 55.3 metres (181 ft 5 in) long overall with a beam 11.3 metres (37 ft 1 in) and a draught of 3.4 metres (11 ft 2 in). The coastal defence vessels are powered by four Jeumont ANR-53-50 alternators coupled to four Wärtsilä UD 23V12 diesel engines creating 7.2 megawatts (9,700 hp). Two LIPS Z-drive azimuth thrusters are driven by two Jeumont CI 560L motors creating 3,000 horsepower (2,200 kW) and the Z drives can be rotated 360°. This gives the ships a maximum speed of 15 knots (28 km/h; 17 mph) and a range of 5,000 nautical miles (9,300 km; 5,800 mi) at 8 knots (15 km/h; 9.2 mph).

The Kingston class is equipped with two Sperry Marine Bridgemaster "E" navigational radars, one using the I band and the other operating in the E and F bands. In 2017 Edmonton will be fitted with the Sperry Marine navigation suite, including updated NAVIGAT X gyrocompasses and NAVITWIN IV heading management system and repeaters. The vessels are equipped to carry an AN/SQS-511 towed side scan sonar for minesweeping and a Remote-control Mine Hunting System (RMHS). The vessels were equipped with one Bofors 40 mm/60 calibre Mk 5C gun and two M2 machine guns. (Note: The 60 calibre denotes the length of the gun. This means that the length of the gun barrel is 60 times the bore diameter.) The 40 mm gun was declared obsolete and removed from the vessels in 2014. Some of them ended up as museum pieces and on display at naval reserve installations across Canada. The Kingston-class coastal defence vessels have a regular complement of 33, with bunks available (using the accommodations payload) for up to 47.

== Service history ==
Edmonton was laid down on 8 August 1995 by Halifax Shipyards Ltd. at Halifax, Nova Scotia, and was launched on 31 October 1996. The ship underwent sea trials on the east coast before transferring to the west coast, accompanied by Moresby. The vessel was commissioned into the Canadian Forces on 21 June 1997 at Esquimalt, British Columbia and carries the hull number MM 703.

In June–July 2002, Edmonton and sister ships Nanaimo and Saskatoon participated in the naval exercise RIMPAC 2002 off Hawaii.

In September 2013, Edmonton and sister ship Yellowknife sailed from Esquimalt for Operation Caribbe, the first such deployment of west coast Kingston class. On 25 October, Edmonton and her embarked United States Coast Guard Law Enforcement Detachment (LEDET) intercepted a panga-style vessel and seized 639 kilograms (1,409 lb) of cocaine. Two days later, Edmonton and her LEDET intercepted a second vessel and recovered 468 kg (1,032 lb) of cocaine that had been jettisoned during the chase. After the 40 mm gun was declared obsolete in 2014 and removed from Edmonton, Edmonton's mount was donated to the Edmonton Garrison Memorial Golf and Curling Club in April 2018.

In February 2016 Edmonton and Saskatoon sailed from Esquimalt to join Operation Caribbe. On 25 March, in conjunction with the United States Navy destroyer Lassen, Edmonton intercepted drug smugglers in international waters off the coast of Central America. After being stopped, the smuggling vessel attempted to dump its cargo overboard. Edmonton, working with a LEDET detachment, recovered 27 bales of cocaine equalling 650 kg (1,430 lb). Edmonton and Saskatoon returned to Esquimalt on 29 April 2016. On 6 October, Brandon and Edmonton left Esquimalt to participate in Operation Caribbe along the Pacific coast. Between 15 and 18 November, Edmonton disrupted three separate shipments of illegal narcotics. On 15 November, Edmonton recovered 40 kg (88 lb) from the ocean after a fishing vessel was intercepted by the United States Coast Guard. On 17 November, a second fishing vessel was stopped by the United States Coast Guard and Edmonton recovered 16 bales of cocaine weighing roughly 760 kg (1,680 lb) from the ocean. On 18 November, Edmonton took 15 bales of cocaine weighing roughly 710 kg (1,570 lb) from the ocean after the drug smugglers escaped. Brandon and Edmonton returned to Esquimalt on 16 December.

From August to September 2017, Edmonton and Yellowknife sailed to the Arctic Ocean to perform surveillance of Canada's northern waters as part of Operation Limpid. They returned to Esquimalt on 5 October. In 2018, Edmonton deployed south into the eastern Pacific Ocean as part of Operation Caribbe alongside sister ship Whitehorse. The two ships participated in the intercept and seizure of 2,856 kg (6,296 lb) of illegal drugs. Edmonton and Whitehorse returned to Esquimalt on 3 May. The vessel returned to the eastern Pacific Ocean in November with sister ship Nanaimo, where Edmonton took part in the seizure of 750 kg (1,650 lb) of cocaine. The smugglers escaped and during the seizure, the ship suffered a loss of propulsion. The ship returned to Esquimalt on 17 December.

In 2022, Edmonton was one of the RCN vessels sent to take part in the multinational naval exercise RIMPAC 2022. In February 2023, the vessel was deployed off the Pacific coasts of Central and South America as part of Operation Caribbe. On 8 April, Edmonton, working with the United States Coast Guard, intercepted a drug-smuggling vessel, capturing 755 kg (1,664 lb) of cocaine off the coast of Mexico. Edmonton returned to CFB Esquimalt on 28 April.

HMCS Edmonton is scheduled to decommission in 2027.
