= HMCS Vancouver (FFH 331) =

Royal Canadian Navy frigate

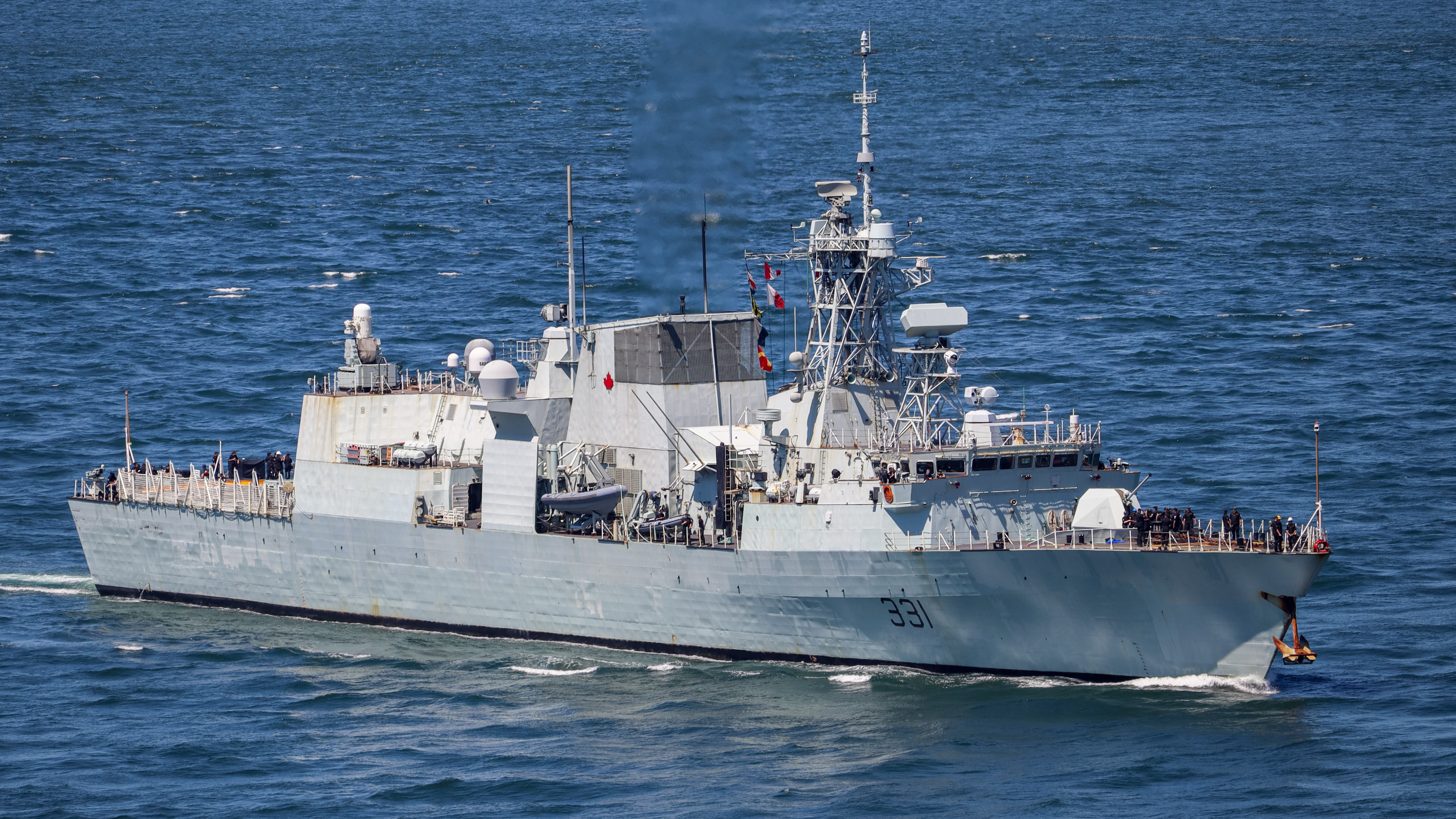
- HMCS Vancouver at Burrard Inlet in June 2025

History

Canada
- Name: Vancouver
- Namesake: Vancouver, British Columbia
- Builder: Saint John Shipbuilding Ltd., Saint John
- Laid down: 19 May 1988
- Launched: 8 July 1989
- Commissioned: 23 August 1993
- Refit: HCM/FELEX May 2013 – May 2014
- Home port: CFB Esquimalt
- Identification: MMSI number: 316160000; Callsign: CGAR; pennant number: 331
- Motto: Semper vigilans (ever on guard)
- Honours and awards: Aleutians 1942–43, Atlantic 1944–1945, Arabian Sea, Libya
- Status: in active service
- Badge: A square-rigged British ship of the line sailing west on the ocean.

General characteristics
- Class & type: Halifax-class frigate
- Displacement: 3,995 t (3,932 long tons) (light); 4,795 t (4,719 long tons) (operational); 5,032 t (4,953 long tons) (deep load)
- Length: 134.2 m (440 ft 3 in)
- Beam: 16.5 m (54 ft 2 in)
- Draught: 7.1 m (23 ft 4 in)
- Propulsion: 2 × LM2500 gas turbines; 1 × SEMT Pielstick diesel engine
- Speed: 30 knots (56 km/h; 35 mph)
- Range: 9,500 nmi (17,600 km; 10,900 mi)
- Complement: 255 (including air detachment)
- Armament: Missiles; 2 × quad Mk 141 canisters for 8 × RGM-84 Harpoon block II AShM/LAM; 2 × 8-cell Mk 48 vertical launch system firing 16 × RIM-162 Evolved Sea Sparrow block II SAM/SSM; Guns; 1 × Bofors 57 mm Mk3 gun; 1 × Phalanx CIWS Mk 15 Mod 21 block 1B; 4 × .50-calibre M2HQ Mini Typhoon NRWS; Torpedoes; 2 × twin 324 mm (12.8 in) Mk 32 torpedo tubes for 24 × Honeywell Mk 46 Mod 5 torpedoes
- Aircraft carried: 1 × CH-148 Cyclone
- Aviation facilities: One helicopter landing pad and one hangar

HMCS Vancouver is a Halifax-class frigate, of the Royal Canadian Navy launched on 8 July 1989, as the second vessel of her class. She is based at CFB Esquimalt on the west coast of Canada, and is the third vessel to be named after Vancouver, British Columbia.

== Description and design ==
The Halifax-class frigate design of which Vancouver belongs, was ordered by the Canadian Forces in 1977 as a replacement for the aging St. Laurent, Restigouche, Mackenzie, and Annapolis classes of destroyer escorts, which were all tasked with anti-submarine warfare. In July 1983, the federal government approved the budget for the design and construction of the first batch of six new frigates of which Vancouver was a part, out of twelve that were eventually built. To reflect the changing long-term strategy of the Navy during the 1980s and 1990s, the Halifax-class frigates was designed as a general purpose warship with particular focus on anti-submarine capabilities.

As built, the Halifax-class vessels displaced 4,750 long tons (4,830 t) and were 134.65 metres (441 ft 9 in) long overall and 124.49 metres (408 ft 5 in) between perpendiculars with a beam of 16.36 metres (53 ft 8 in) and a draught of 4.98 metres (16 ft 4 in). That made them slightly larger than the Iroquois-class destroyers. The vessels are propelled by two shafts with Escher Wyss controllable pitch propellers driven by a CODOG system of two General Electric LM2500 gas turbines, generating 47,500 shaft horsepower (35,400 kW) and one SEMT Pielstick 20 PA6 V 280 diesel engine, generating 8,800 shaft horsepower (6,600 kW).

This gives the frigates a maximum speed of 29 knots (54 km/h; 33 mph) and a range of 7,000 nautical miles (13,000 km; 8,100 mi) at 15 knots (28 km/h; 17 mph) while using their diesel engines. Using their gas turbines, the ships have a range of 3,930 nautical miles (7,280 km; 4,520 mi) at 18 knots (33 km/h; 21 mph). The Halifax class have a complement of 198 naval personnel of which 17 are officers and 17 aircrew of which 8 are officers.

=== Armament and aircraft ===
As built the Halifax-class vessels deployed the CH-124 Sea King helicopter, which acted in concert with shipboard sensors to seek out and destroy submarines at long distances from the ships. The ships have a helicopter deck fitted with a "bear trap" system allowing the launch and recovery of helicopters in up to sea state 6. The Halifax class also carries a close-in anti-submarine weapon in the form of the Mark 46 torpedo, launched from twin Mark 32 Mod 9 torpedo tubes in launcher compartments either side of the forward end of the helicopter hangar.

As built, the anti-shipping role is supported by the RGM-84 Harpoon Block 1C surface-to-surface missile, mounted in two quadruple launch tubes at the main deck level between the funnel and the helicopter hangar. For anti-aircraft self-defence the ships are armed with the Sea Sparrow vertical launch surface-to-air missile in two Mk 48 Mod 0 eight-cell launchers placed to port and starboard of the funnel. The vessels carry 16 missiles. A Raytheon/General Dynamics Phalanx Mark 15 Mod 21 Close-In Weapon System (CIWS) is mounted on top of the helicopter hangar for "last-ditch" defence against targets that evade the Sea Sparrow.

As built, the main gun on the forecastle is a 57 mm (2.2 in)/70 calibre Mark 2 gun from Bofors. The gun is capable of firing 2.4-kilogram (5.3 lb) shells at a rate of 220 rounds per minute at a range of more than 17 kilometres (11 mi).

=== Countermeasures and sensors ===
As built, the decoy system comprises Two BAE Systems Shield Mark 2 decoy launchers which fire chaff to 2 kilometres (1.2 mi) and infrared rockets to 169 metres (185 yd) in distraction, confusion and centroid seduction modes. The torpedo decoy is the AN/SLQ-25A Nixie towed acoustic decoy from Argon ST. The ship's radar warning receiver, the CANEWS (Canadian Electronic Warfare System), SLQ-501, and the radar jammer, SLQ-505, were developed by Thorn and Lockheed Martin Canada.

Two Thales Nederland (formerly Signaal) SPG-503 (STIR 1.8) fire control radars are installed one on the roof of the bridge and one on the raised radar platform immediately forward of the helicopter hangar. The ship is also fitted with Raytheon AN/SPS-49(V)5 long-range active air search radar operating at C and D bands, Ericsson HC150 Sea Giraffe medium-range air and surface search radar operating at G and H bands, and Kelvin Hughes Type 1007 I-band navigation radar. The sonar suite includes the CANTASS Canadian Towed Array and GD-C AN/SQS-510 hull mounted sonar and incorporates an acoustic range prediction system. The sonobuoy processing system is the GD-C AN/UYS-503.

=== Modernization ===
The Halifax class underwent a modernization program, known as the Halifax Class Modernization (HCM) program, in order to update the frigates' capabilities in combating modern smaller, faster and more mobile threats. This involved upgrading the command and control, radar, communications, electronic warfare and armament systems. Further improvements, such as modifying the vessel to accommodate the new Sikorsky CH-148 Cyclone helicopter and satellite communication links was done separately as part of the FELEX program.

The Frigate Equipment Life Extension (FELEX) program comprised upgrading the combat systems integration to CMS330. The SPS-49 2D long range air search radar was replaced by the Thales Nederland SMART-S Mk 2 E/F-band 3D surveillance radar, and the two STIR 1.8 fire control radars were replaced by a pair of CEROS 200 Fire Control radars. A Telephonics IFF Mode 5/S interrogator was installed and the Elisra NS9003A-V2HC ESM system replaced the SLQ-501 CANEWS. An IBM multi-link (Link 11, Link 16 and Link 22 enabled) datalink processing system was installed along with two Raytheon Anschütz Pathfinder Mk II navigation radars. Furthermore, Rheinmetall's Multi-Ammunition Soft kill System (MASS), known as MASS DUERAS was introduced to replace the Plessey Shield decoy system. The existing 57 mm Mk 2 guns were upgraded to the Mk 3 standard and the Harpoon missiles were improved to Block II levels, the Phalanx was upgraded to Block 1B and the obsolete Sea Sparrow system was replaced by the Evolved Sea Sparrow Missile.

== Construction and career ==
The frigate's keel was laid down on 19 May 1988 by Saint John Shipbuilding at Saint John, New Brunswick, the second ship of her class. Vancouver was launched on 8 July 1989. After trials, the warship was commissioned on 23 August 1993 in her namesake city of Vancouver alongside Canada Place, third ship of the class, as sister ship Toronto commissioned almost a month before her. After commissioning, she was assigned to CFB Esquimalt, British Columbia on Vancouver Island as the first Halifax-class frigate to be based there.

From May to July 1994, the frigate took part in the RIMPAC naval exercise off the coast of Hawaii. The ship then made a training cruise around the Pacific, making several port visits. The following year, Vancouver, with sister ship Regina, deployed on another Pacific training cruise. In 1995, the frigate deployed with a United States Navy carrier battle group. In 1997, Vancouver performed another Pacific training cruise and in 1998, took part in the RIMPAC naval exercise. Vancouver, accompanied by Protecteur, visited Vladivostok, Russia, marking only the second time Canadian warships visited the country since the fall of the Soviet Union.

=== War on Terror ===
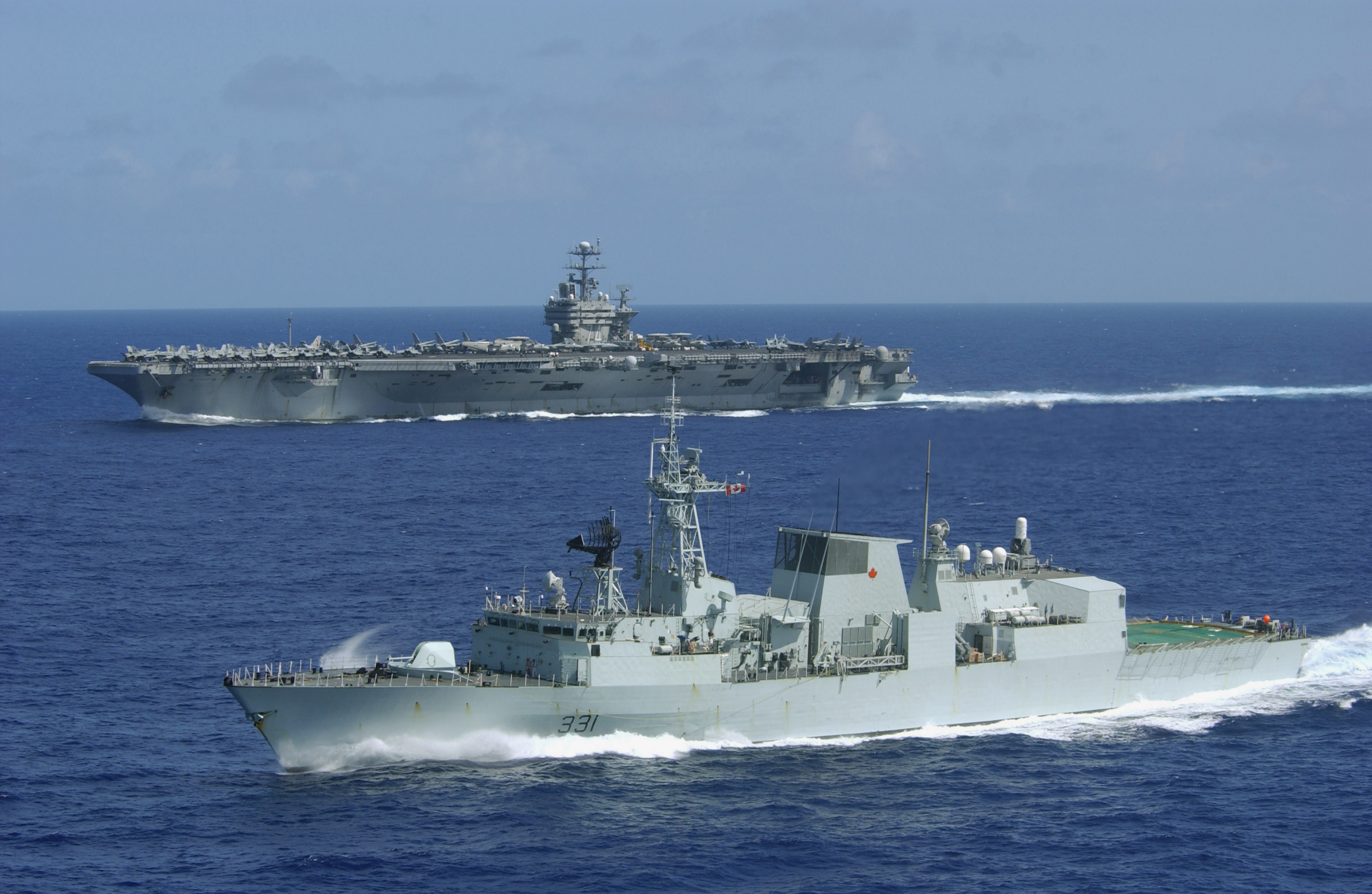
Vancouver as part of the John C. Stennis carrier battle group in 2002

After the 11 September 2001 attacks, Vancouver and her sisters were a primary part of Canada's anti-terrorism naval forces in the Middle East. For instance, Vancouver was an integrated part of the American carrier battle group led by USS John C. Stennis, arriving at Hong Kong on 29 November 2001 and in the Persian Gulf in 19 December. The frigate performed maritime interdiction operations in the Gulf, enforcing sanctions on Iraq. The ship returned to Esquimalt on 28 May 2002.

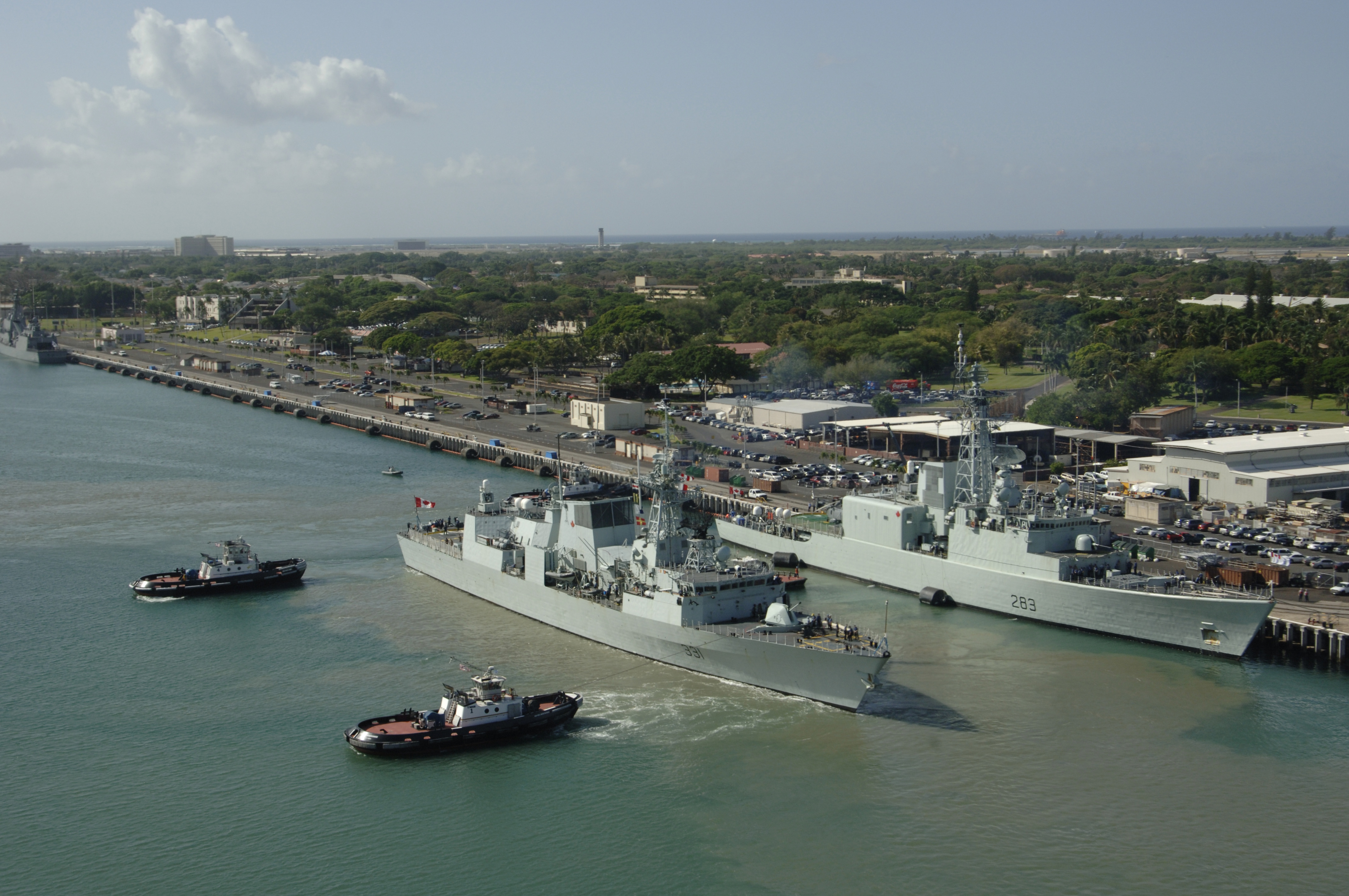
Vancouver (foreground) departs Pearl Harbor for Exercise 'Rim of the Pacific' (RIMPAC) in 2006

During Operation Apollo, Vancouver was used to intercept suspicious and unknown vessels at sea, and had on occasion boarded vessels to prevent the escape of fugitives and the transit of contraband. After a tour of duty in the Arabian Sea, her role in Apollo ended. She was replaced by another Halifax-class frigate to serve much the same role. Vancouver has spent time flying the Canadian flag more locally, including a trip to Oregon in 2003 and a visit to her namesake city of Vancouver to celebrate the tenth anniversary of her being commissioned.

=== 2011 Libyan civil war ===
On 10 July 2011, Vancouver left her home port of Esquimalt to join the NATO-led air-sea Operation Unified Protector during the 2011 Libyan civil war. She was delayed by a small fire in her boiler. The fire was detected quickly and dealt with, delaying her departure only by an hour. The overall Canadian Forces contribution to Operation Unified Protector is known as Operation Mobile. She relieved Charlottetown, which had been on patrol in the region since the early spring. Operation Mobile closed on 1 November 2011, Vancouver was transferred to the NATO-led Operation Active Endeavour on 15 November 2011. She set course for her home port of CFB Esquimalt on 10 January 2012.

=== Refit ===
On 6 May 2013 Vancouver was turned over to Seaspan Marine Corporation's Victoria Shipyards, to start an 18-month mid-life upgrading and modernization program. The HCM/FELEX refit was completed in May 2014.

=== Harpoon Block II testing ===
In October 2015, Vancouver, along with Calgary and Chicoutimi, participated in the United States Navy's Task Group Exercise, a naval exercise held off southern California. In April 2016, Vancouver was used as the testbed for the launch of the new Harpoon Block II surface-to-surface missile, increasing the land strike capabilities of the frigate class.

=== Pacific deployment ===
In June 2016, Calgary, Vancouver, Saskatoon and Yellowknife sailed from Esquimalt to participate in the RIMPAC naval exercise. Following RIMPAC, Vancouver was sent on a training cruise around the Pacific, making several port visits and participating in the Royal Australian Navy's training exercise "Kakadu".

Vancouver was sent to take part in the Royal New Zealand Navy's 75th Birthday Celebrations on 19–21 November 2016. However, following an earthquake in New Zealand's South Island, the frigate was re-directed to Kaikōura to aide in humanitarian and disaster relief operations. In 2018, Vancouver deployed to the Pacific, participating in training with the Fijian Navy. In June and July 2018, Vancouver, along with sister ship Ottawa and the supply ship Asterix, took part in RIMPAC 2018 around the Hawaiian Islands.

In 2022, Vancouver and Winnipeg were deployed to the RIMPAC naval exercise off Hawaii followed by taking part in enforcing UN sanctions against North Korea. In September 2022, Vancouver sailed through the Taiwan Strait alongside the guided-missile destroyer USS Higgins in a freedom-of-navigation demonstration. In mid 2024, Vancouver took part in the multi-national exercise RIMPAC 2024 along with HMCS Max Bernays and Asterix.

== Badge ==
The ship's badge depicts a square-rigged, Royal Navy ship of the line sailing west along the ocean. The vessel in the badge is intended to represent HMS Discovery, which, under the command of Captain George Vancouver, mapped much of North America's north-western coast and learned more about the area than had hereto been discovered. Among the geographical locations named after Vancouver is the city of Vancouver, British Columbia. The badge has been maintained through the history of all three Canadian vessels named Vancouver.
