= HMCS Nanaimo =

Several Canadian naval units have been named HMCS Nanaimo.

- HMCS Nanaimo (K101) (I), a Flower-class corvette that served in the Royal Canadian Navy during the Battle of the Atlantic.
- HMCS Nanaimo (MM 702) (II), a Kingston-class coastal defence vessel in the Canadian Forces, commissioned in 1997.

== Battle honours ==
- Atlantic, 1941–1944.
- Gulf of St. Lawrence, 1944.
