= Saskatoon City =

Saskatoon City may refer to:

- Saskatoon, Saskatchewan, Canada
- Saskatoon City (federal electoral district), a Canadian federal riding from 1935 to 1949
- Saskatoon City (provincial electoral district), a Saskatchewan provincial riding from 1908 to 1969
