= Jeumont-Schneider =

- Type: Subsidiary
- Industry: Rail transport
- Founded: 1964; 62 years ago
- Successor: Alstom and Framatome
- Headquarters: Paris, France
- Area served: Worldwide
- Products: Electric motors Industrial controls Hydraulic pumps Railway motors (pre-1986)
- Owner: Alstom (Inspiration)

Jeumont-Schneider was a French electric and mechanical engineering group, founded in 1964.

== History ==
Jeumont-Schneider was formed in 1964 through a merger of FACEJ (Forges et Ateliers de Construction Electriques de Jeumont) and Matériel Electrique S-W (Schneider-Westinghouse).

The company had activities in electric motors and other power electrical equipment, industrial controls and automation, hydraulic pumps, and included equipment for the nuclear industry.

In 1986, the company divested its loss-making railway traction activities to Alstom. The group's telephony business, unsuccessful in comparison to Matra, was sold to Bosch in 1988.

In 1992, the activities of Jeumont-Schneider Industrie relating to nuclear power were taken over by Framatome. Other activities of the group: Jeumont Schneider Industrie and the division Jeumont-Schneider Automation went into joint management by Framatome and Alstom-Alcatel; the divisions were renamed Jeumont Industrie and Jeumont Automation.
