= Project Resolve =

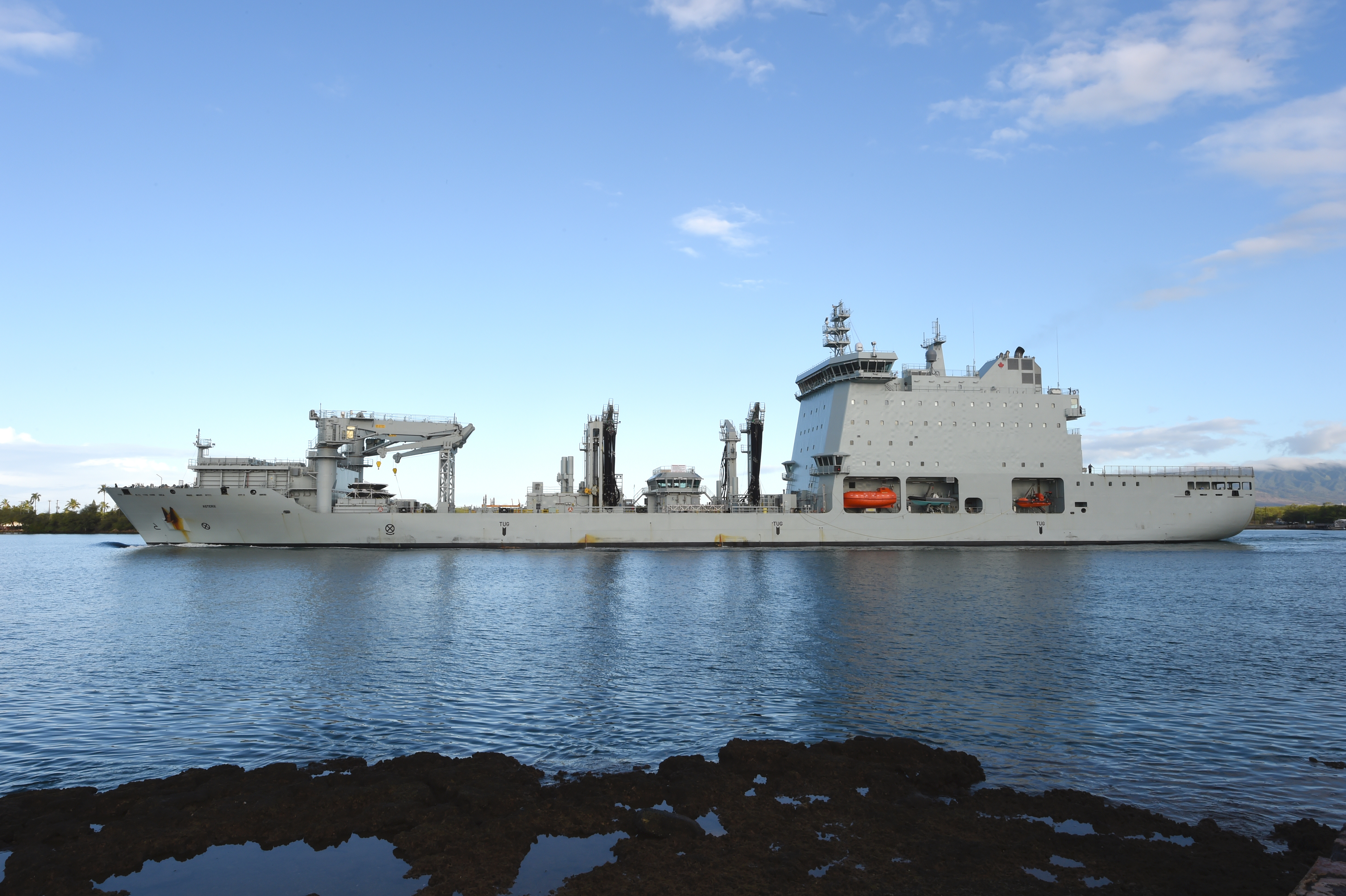
MV Asterix in July 2018

Project Resolve is the name of a pan-consortium made up of Chantier Davie Canada, Aecon Pictou Shipyard of Pictou, Nova Scotia and NavTech, a naval architectural firm, to develop an interim fleet supply vessel for the Royal Canadian Navy (RCN) until the previously ordered Protecteur-class auxiliary vessels are complete. As of 2016, the project purchased MS Asterix, a commercial container ship, and is converting the vessel into an auxiliary naval replenishment ship that will be rented by the Royal Canadian Navy. The conversion was expected to be completed and the ship active in service by 2017. In late 2017, Davie proposed extending the project through the conversion of a second ship to ensure full capability for both the Atlantic and Pacific fleets.

== Background ==
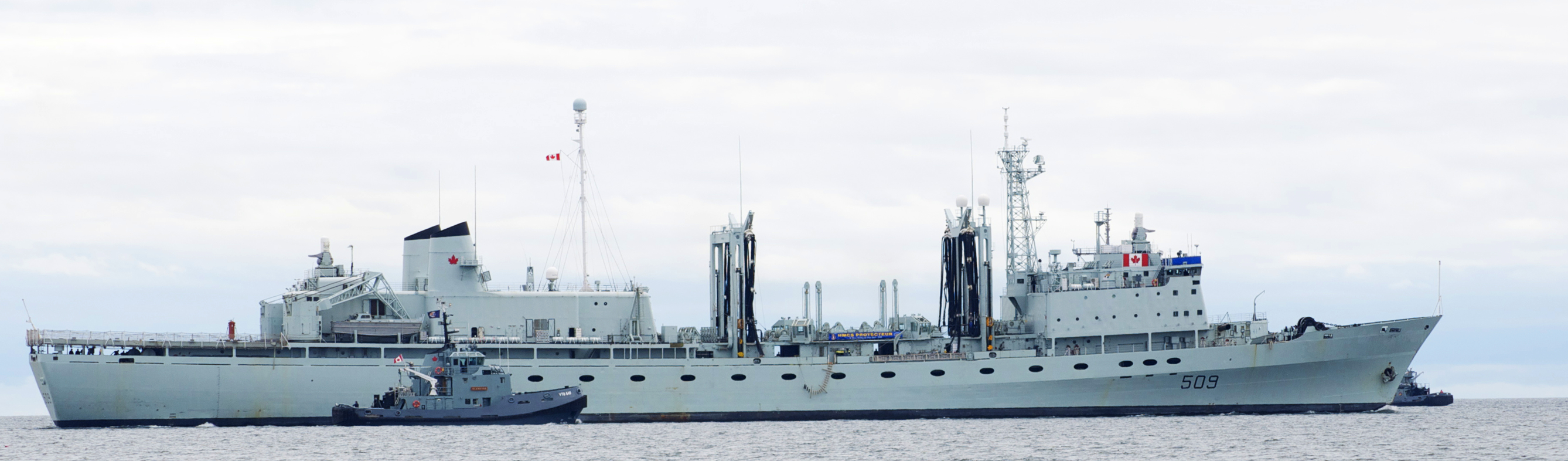
HMCS Protecteur, one of the previous Protecteur-class replenishment oilers

The Royal Canadian Navy intended to replace its aging Protecteur-class replenishment oilers with new joint support ships in 2008. However that program was cancelled shortly before the 2008 federal election by the Conservatives after those bids that were entered by interested shipyards came in too high.

The program to replace the Protecteur class was revived as part of the National Shipbuilding Procurement Strategy. The new Protecteur-class auxiliary vessels were intended to enter service in 2020. Protecteur was intended to be in service until 2017 and Preserver until 2016, however a catastrophic fire aboard Protecteur in 2014 led to her early decommissioning and an engineering survey discovered high levels of corrosion in Preserver that led to her being kept alongside in Halifax. This left a significant operational gap for the RCN. The Navy set about trying to fill the gap, renting the replenishment services of other navies, specifically the Chilean Almirante Montt on the Pacific coast and for the Atlantic coast, inquiring into renting a ship from Spain. In 2014 Chantier Davie pitched an unsolicited plan for an interim supply ship to the Conservative government. Following that, Seaspan and Irving Shipbuilding also submitted proposals that were ultimately unsuccessful. Chantier Davie's plan was chosen and the Conservative government began exploring their proposal.

== Awarding of contract ==
In June 2015, the Conservative government changed a line in contracting regulations that govern Cabinet spending that allowed them to award a sole-sourced contract when operationally necessary and fulfills an interim need. It was announced shortly thereafter that the government had entered into discussions with Chantier Davie Canada on whether it could provide an interim supply ship until the new Protecteur-class vessels were ready.

This led the Conservative government signing a letter of intent with Chantier Davie to explore a plan to convert a civilian cargo ship into an interim auxiliary vessel. A second converted ship was offered to the RCN, but was declined. Chantier Davie moved ahead with the project, purchasing the container ship MS Asterix from Capital Ship Management of Greece for a reported $20 million.

Initially the plan was for the ship to be brought to the Aecon Yard in Pictou, and then completed at Davie's yard in Quebec. However, Asterix instead went directly to Davie's yard at Lévis, Quebec, arriving in October. On 10 August 2015, Chantier Davie signed an agreement for work on the conversion with Hepburn Engineering of Ontario who specializes in maritime underway replenishment equipment. In September, it was announced that L-3 MAPPS (a subsidiary of L-3 Communications), was selected as partner in the conversion for its Integrated Platform Management System. It is also planned to re-utilise the resupply equipment from Protecteur by installing it aboard Asterix. OSI Maritime Systems was chosen by Davie Shipyards to install their integrated navigation and tactical system aboard the converted ship.

In October 2015, the Conservative government finalized that plan, which would cost $700 million over seven years including $300 million for the conversion itself, but left final authorization until after the election. The RCN also would have the option of buying the ship after completion.

== Delay and completion ==
In November 2015, following the reception of a letter from James D. Irving, co-chief executive officer of Irving Shipbuilding, the Liberal Trudeau government postponed the final authorization of the project for two months. This decision provoked a response from Philippe Couillard, Premier of Quebec, the location of the Davie shipyard. Couillard stated that he would not accept Ottawa halting or any alterations to the project going forward. Other political leaders within Quebec were equally vocal against any changes. Had the contract not been signed, the Government of Canada would have been obliged to pay Chantier Davie $89 million according to the Letter of Intent signed earlier in the year.

On 30 November 2015, the Liberal government gave final approval for the project, allowing the conversion to go ahead. Subsequently, the Government accused the commander of the Royal Canadian Navy, Vice-Admiral Mark Norman, of leaking cabinet secrets to a CBC reporter and executive at Quebec's Davie Shipyard thereby undermining the Government's initial efforts to cancel the deal. Admiral Norman's lawyers argued that "his prosecution was politically motivated, with the Prime Minister's Office, specifically, being infuriated with the leak of information." The charges were subsequently stayed by the Crown due to insufficient evidence with the failed prosecution having cost the Government nearly $1.5 million.

As of October 2016, the conversion itself was ahead of schedule with 60% of the conversion completed. The ship was planned to be available for sea trials in September 2017. On 20 July 2017 Davie Shipbuilding unveiled Asterix in a public ceremony with the traditional breaking of a bottle of champagne. This honour was performed by Pauline Théberge, spouse of J. Michel Doyon, the Lieutenant Governor of Quebec. The vessel was re-launched on 15 October 2017 at Quebec City. Sea trials were scheduled to begin on 16 November in Gaspé Bay. The ship was accepted by the Royal Canadian Navy on 6 March 2018 at Halifax, Nova Scotia. A second ship, to be named Obelix was offered to the Canadian government but the offer was refused in December 2017. The government claimed that the Canadian military had performed an assessment and found no need for a second supply ship. Federal Fleet Services attempted to sell the government the second ship again in December 2018, this time at a reduced price of $500 million.

== Conversion features ==
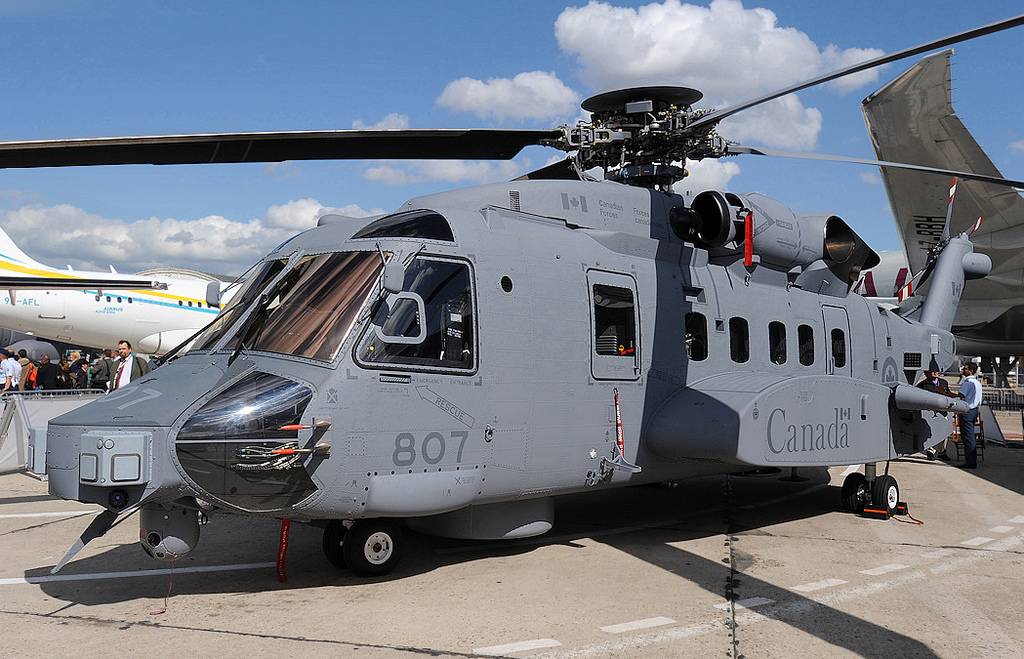
A Sikorsky CH-148 Cyclone

Asterix is used for at sea fuel replenishing for both liquid and solids using NATO-standardised methods and two cranes for loading and unloading purposes. The ship is able to deliver 400 tons of fresh water per day and carry 7,000 tons of fuel oil. The vessel has a container bay for protection of the containers while in transit. The ship has a double hull, a feature that the previous Protecteur class did not have and prevented them from operating outside of international waters.

For mission purposes the ship has rooms for crew and medical/hospital facilities for humanitarian missions, along with humanitarian and disaster relief capabilities. There is an area to treat and process evacuees and survivors, a large medical ward divided into two areas capable of treating up to 60. The ship also provides room for 350 in emergency situations. Asterix, post-conversion, is able to operate up to eight smaller boats with quick launch and recovery capability. Asterix has two aircraft hangars capable of embarking two CH-148 Cyclones, and a landing deck capable of handling some of the largest helicopters, including the CH-147F Chinook.

== MV Obelix ==
Davie offered a second conversion, MV Obelix, that could be made ready within 24 months. The federal government rejected the second conversion, and chose to go forward with the Protecteur-class ships.

== Other bids ==
Two other Canadian shipbuilders submitted proposals to the government to convert a civilian cargo vessel into a naval replenishment vessel. Both proposals, one by Irving Shipbuilding, the other by Seaspan, were initially rejected at the time by the Conservative government. Irving Shipbuilding sent a letter to the new Trudeau government, asking them to review the project, stating that they could provide a cheaper option than what Davie proposed.

Irving criticised the Davie plan, claiming that a container ship is "wrong" and that it would require "too much conversion...too risky, too expensive and doesn't provide the large interior payload." Irving instead submitted a design based on a roll-on/roll-off vessel that "would be capable of refueling two ships simultaneously, as well as landing helicopters and allowing large trucks and emergency response vehicles to drive on and off."

Seaspan's Victoria Shipyards reaffirmed their proposal in November, claiming to do it at a lower cost than that provided by Davie Shipyards. They presented two options to the government, one a "fuel supply only and another for a supply and support option."

Federal Fleet and Chantier Davie have begun campaigning for the construction of additional Resolve-class auxiliary oiler replenishment (AOR) ships. Davie notes that the Resolve class has performance and capability characteristics that match or exceed the characteristics of the joint support ships (Protecteur class) for only 25% the cost of one of the joint support ships. Davie Shipbuilding's actual cost for the Resolve-class AOR is less than $500 million per ship, compared to the joint support ships' cost estimate of $2 billion per ship.
