= List of ship decommissionings in 2015 =

The list of ship decommissionings in 2015 includes a chronological list of ships decommissioned in 2015.

	Operator	Ship	Flag	Class and type	Pennant	Fate	Other notes
14 January	United States Navy	McClusky		Oliver Hazard Perry-class frigate	FFG-41	Sunk as target	
23 January	United States Navy	Rodney M. Davis		Oliver Hazard Perry-class frigate	FFG-60	Sunk as target	
30 January	United States Navy	Elrod		Oliver Hazard Perry-class frigate	FFG-55	Foreign Military Sale	
19 February	United States Navy	Vandegrift		Oliver Hazard Perry-class frigate	FFG-48	Sunk as target	
31 March	United States Navy	Peleliu		Tarawa-class amphibious assault ship	LHA-5	Reserve at Pearl Harbor, HI	
5 May	United States Navy	Taylor		Oliver Hazard Perry-class frigate	FFG-50	Transferred to Republic of China Navy as ROCS Ming Chuan (PFG-1112)	
15 May	Royal Canadian Navy	Protecteur		Protecteur-class replenishment oiler	AOR 509	Scrapped in Nova Scotia	
22 May	United States Navy	Samuel B. Roberts		Oliver Hazard Perry-class frigate	FFG-58	Scheduled to be scrapped	
June	Royal Navy	Endurance		Ice patrol ship	A171	Scrapped	Had been out of service since severe flooding in 2008.
5 August	United States Navy	Gary		Oliver Hazard Perry-class frigate	FFG-51	Transferred to Republic of China Navy as ROCS Feng Jia (PFG-1115)	
19 September	Royal Canadian Navy	Algonquin		Iroquois-class destroyer	DDG 283	Scrapped in Nova Scotia	
30 September	Royal Navy	Orangeleaf		Leaf-class replenishment tanker	A110	Scrapped	
30 September	United States Navy	Simpson		Oliver Hazard Perry-class frigate	FFG-56	Sunk as a target	
7 November	Royal Australian Navy	Sydney		Adelaide-class frigate	FFG 03	Scrapped	
23 December	Indian Navy	Godavari		Godavari-class frigate	F20		
