= HMCS Protecteur (AOR 509) =

Canadian warship, 1966

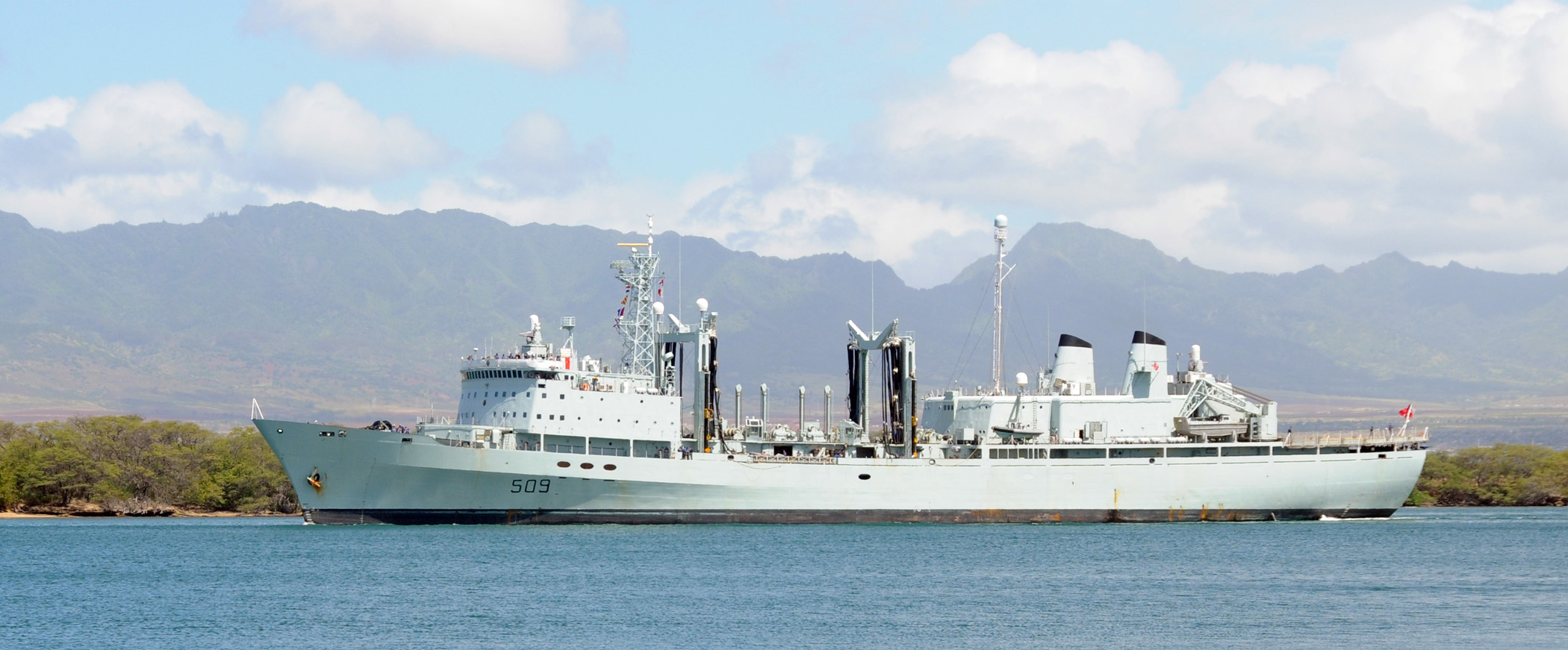
- HMCS Protecteur in Pearl Harbor after a port visit in 2009

History

Canada
- Name: Protecteur
- Operator: Royal Canadian Navy
- Ordered: 16 December 1966
- Builder: Saint John Shipbuilding
- Laid down: 17 October 1967
- Launched: 18 July 1968
- Commissioned: 30 August 1969
- Decommissioned: 14 May 2015
- Home port: CFB Esquimalt, British Columbia
- Identification: IMO number: 6900678; MMSI number: 316146000; Callsign: CYTV
- Motto: Soutien avec Courage ("Support with Courage")
- Honours and awards: Gulf and Kuwait; Arabian Sea
- Fate: Sold for scrap 27 November 2015 at Liverpool, Nova Scotia
- Badge: Azure, a silver helmet with the five grills or, garnished of the last, and bearing a coronet "fleur-de-lis" also or.

General characteristics
- Class & type: Protecteur-class replenishment oiler
- Displacement: 8,380 t (8,248 long tons) standard; 24,700 t (24,310 long tons) full load
- Length: 171.9 m (564 ft 0 in)
- Beam: 23.2 m (76 ft 1 in)
- Draught: 10.1 m (33 ft 2 in)
- Ice class: 3
- Propulsion: 2 × Babcock & Wilcox boilers; 1 × General Electric steam turbine; 21,000 shp (16,000 kW)
- Speed: 20 knots (37 km/h; 23 mph)
- Range: 7,500 nmi (13,900 km; 8,600 mi); at 11.5 knots (21.3 km/h; 13.2 mph)
- Complement: 365 officers and crew (men and women) including 45 in air detachment
- Electronic warfare & decoys: 4 × BAE Systems Mark 36 SRBOC chaff launchers; AN/SLQ-25 Nixie towed decoy
- Armament: 2 × 20 mm Phalanx CIWS; 6 × .50 calibre machine guns
- Aircraft carried: 3 × CH-124 Sea King helicopters
- Aviation facilities: aft deck hangar and flight deck

HMCS Protecteur (AOR 509) (Note: HMCS stands for Her Majesty's Canadian Ship as the sovereign of Canada was Queen Elizabeth II at the time the ship was in service.) was the lead ship of the Protecteur-class replenishment oilers in service with the Royal Canadian Navy. She was part of Maritime Forces Pacific (MARPAC), homeported at CFB Esquimalt, British Columbia. Built by Saint John Shipbuilding and Dry Docks in Saint John, New Brunswick, she was commissioned on 30 August 1969. She was the first Canadian naval unit to carry the name Protecteur; however, there have been several units, including a base, named HMCS Protector.

Mostly known for her humanitarian efforts, Protecteur had also served in times of war including Operation Friction and Operation Apollo in the Persian Gulf region, multi-national naval exercises, and as part of the INTERFET in East Timor. Operation Apollo was the largest deployment of the Royal Canadian Navy since the Korean War. In six months Protecteur logged over 50,000 nautical miles (93,000 km; 58,000 mi), delivering over 150,000 barrels (~20,000 t) of fuel and 390 pallets of dry goods to deployed coalition ships. Protecteur, as well as her sister ship Preserver, were scheduled to be paid off in 2017, however, damage due to an engine fire aboard the ship in 2014 forced Protecteur to be paid off prematurely. Protecteur was decommissioned at a farewell ceremony on 14 May 2015.

== Building Protecteur ==
Protecteur was the first Canadian naval unit to carry the name Protecteur, French for "Protector"; however, there have been two Australian and seven British naval units named Protector. The name was also used for a Canadian base, named HMCS Protector.

=== Construction ===
First authorized in 1959, Protecteur was constructed by Saint John Shipbuilding and Dry Docks in Saint John, New Brunswick, starting on 17 October 1967, was launched on 18 July 1968, and was commissioned by the Canadian Forces on 30 August 1969.

=== General characteristics ===
Protecteur was one of two ships in the Protecteur class of replenishment oilers in service with the Royal Canadian Navy. The ship was 171.9 metres (564 ft 0 in) long and 23.2 metres (76 ft 1 in) wide, with a displacement between 8,380 and 24,700 tonnes (8,248 and 24,310 long tons) depending on her load. Protecteur's draught was 10.1 m (33 ft 2 in), and she had been given an ice rating of three.

Two Babcock & Wilcox boilers fed a single General Electric steam turbine rated at 21,000 shaft horsepower (16,000 kW) that drove a single propeller, allowing the ship to reach a maximum speed of 20 knots (37 km/h; 23 mph). At 20 knots (37 km/h; 23 mph), the range of Protecteur was limited to 4,100 nautical miles (7,600 kilometres; 4,700 miles), but her range could be extended to 7,500 nautical miles (13,900 km; 8,600 mi) when only travelling at 11.5 knots (21.3 km/h; 13.2 mph).

Protecteur's primary role was to deliver supplies to deployed ships. Fully loaded, Protecteur could store up to 14,590 t (14,360 long tons) of fuel, 400 t (394 long tons) of aviation fuel, 1,048 t (1,031 long tons) of dry cargo, and 1,250 t (1,230 long tons) of ammunition. Fuel could be transferred at a rate of 1,500 t (1,476 long tons) per hour and 2,500 lb (1,100 kg) of dry cargo per hour could be transferred all while travelling at her top speed.

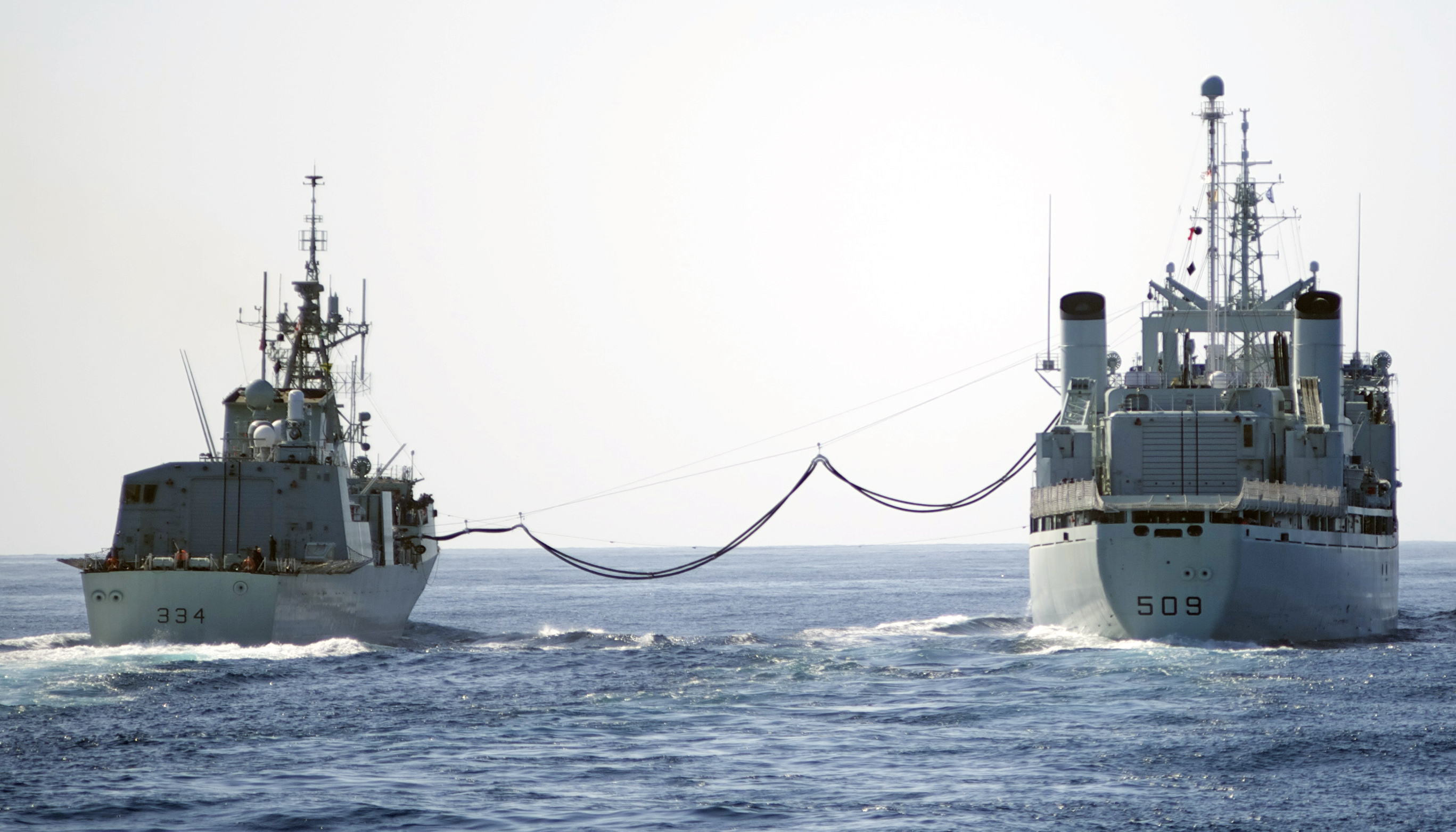
HMCS Regina being refuelled by Protecteur in the Pacific Ocean

=== Armament ===
Four BAE Systems Mark 36 SRBOC chaff launchers and an AN/SLQ-25 Nixie towed decoy were the ship's primary defences. When Protecteur was originally launched, she was fitted with a twin 3-inch/50-calibre gun mounted on her bow; however, the 3-inch guns were replaced with two 20 mm Phalanx CIWS mounts, one at the bow and one astern in August 1990. The CIWS emplacements were part of the upgrades that Protecteur received before deploying to the Persian Gulf region. The CIWS was found above the bridge.

Her former 3-inch guns were temporarily fitted, together with two Bofors 40 mm guns, six 0.5-inch (12.7 mm) machine guns, as well as Blowpipe and Javelin MANPADs during the Gulf War. The CIWS mounts were retained after the war, but the Bofors and 76 mm gun were removed from Protecteur after returning from war.

Originally Protecteur was to be fitted with Mark 29 NATO Sea Sparrow. However, due to delays in procurement, the Sea Sparrow system was never installed. The Sikorsky CH-124 Sea King helicopters on board Protecteur also provided weapons support, carrying Mark 46 torpedoes and a 7.62 mm machine gun.

=== Crew ===
Three hundred sixty-five men and women served on Protecteur. There were 27 officers aboard ship and a total of 45 crew members who were part of the air detachment that flew three CH-124 Sea King helicopters off the back of the ship. In 1988 the crew of Protecteur was officially desegregated, allowing both men and women to serve on board her. Protecteur was equipped with a small dental clinic, which provided dental care for the Canadian Forces when deployed.

== Service ==
Protecteur during Operation Friction

In 1974 the Polish sailboat Gedania embarked on an attempt to traverse the Northwest Passage, as part of a journey to circumnavigate the North and South American continents. Although the Canadian authorities refused to grant the necessary visa, the captain of the yacht persisted, and Protecteur was sent to intercept the yacht on 30 August 1975. The captain eventually turned back of his own accord, but the operation was estimated to have cost $400,000 (equivalent to $2.26 million in 2025).

In 1980, while Protecteur was operating off the coast of Portugal, Commanding Officer Captain Larry Dzioba hoisted an Esso flag on the ship's mast, joking that they were the "biggest floating gas station in the neighbourhood". In 1981, Protecteur served in CARIBOPS 81 off the coast of Puerto Rico, along with at least two Canadian destroyers. Protecteur and her CH-124 helicopters performed a nighttime rescue of the crew of a disabled Norwegian chemical tanker in June 1982. The Norwegian crew was forced to abandon their ship after a fire had broken out. For the 75th anniversary of the Royal Canadian Navy, Protecteur hosted a dinner with the captains of 35 ships, including ships from Belgium, Brazil, Denmark, France, Great Britain, Italy, the Netherlands, Norway, Portugal, and the United States, as well as then Governor General Jeanne Sauvé and Prince Andrew.

In 1991, Protecteur was part of the Canadian contingent sent to the Persian Gulf as part of Operation Desert Shield and later Operation Friction (the Canadian name for its operations during the Gulf War). The ship, part of a three-vessel force, the other two being the Iroquois-class destroyer Athabaskan and the Restigouche-class destroyer Terra Nova, saw extensive service in the Central Gulf. The ship was honoured with the Gulf and Kuwait Medal and the Arabian Sea award for her service in the war. In 1992, Protecteur was sent to help after Hurricane Andrew in Florida, with tasks including repairing schools, community centres, and hospitals in the region. A small pool was built on the helipad of Protecteur providing some relief to hurricane ravaged Floridians. Homes, churches, and a senior centre were also repaired in the Bahamas. The homeport of Protecteur was changed from CFB Halifax to CFB Esquimalt after the hurricane relief efforts. The frigate Vancouver and Protecteur participated in the multi-national RIMPAC 98 off the coast of Hawaii in June 1998.

Protecteur was deployed to East Timor as part of the Australian-led INTERFET peacekeeping taskforce from 23 October 1999 to 23 January 2000. Crew from Protecteur helped reconstruct a police academy in Dili during their deployment in support of INTERFET. The Royal Canadian Mounted Police then used the newly reconstructed academy to set up a training school for the National Police of East Timor. Protecteur participated in Operation Apollo for six months, logging over 50,000 nautical miles (93,000 km; 58,000 mi) and delivering over 150,000 barrels (~20,000 t) of fuel and 390 pallets of dry goods, returning to CFB Esquimalt in November 2002. Operation Apollo was the largest Canadian deployment since the Korean War. Protecteur participated in RIMPAC again in 2004, along with the Algonquin and Regina.

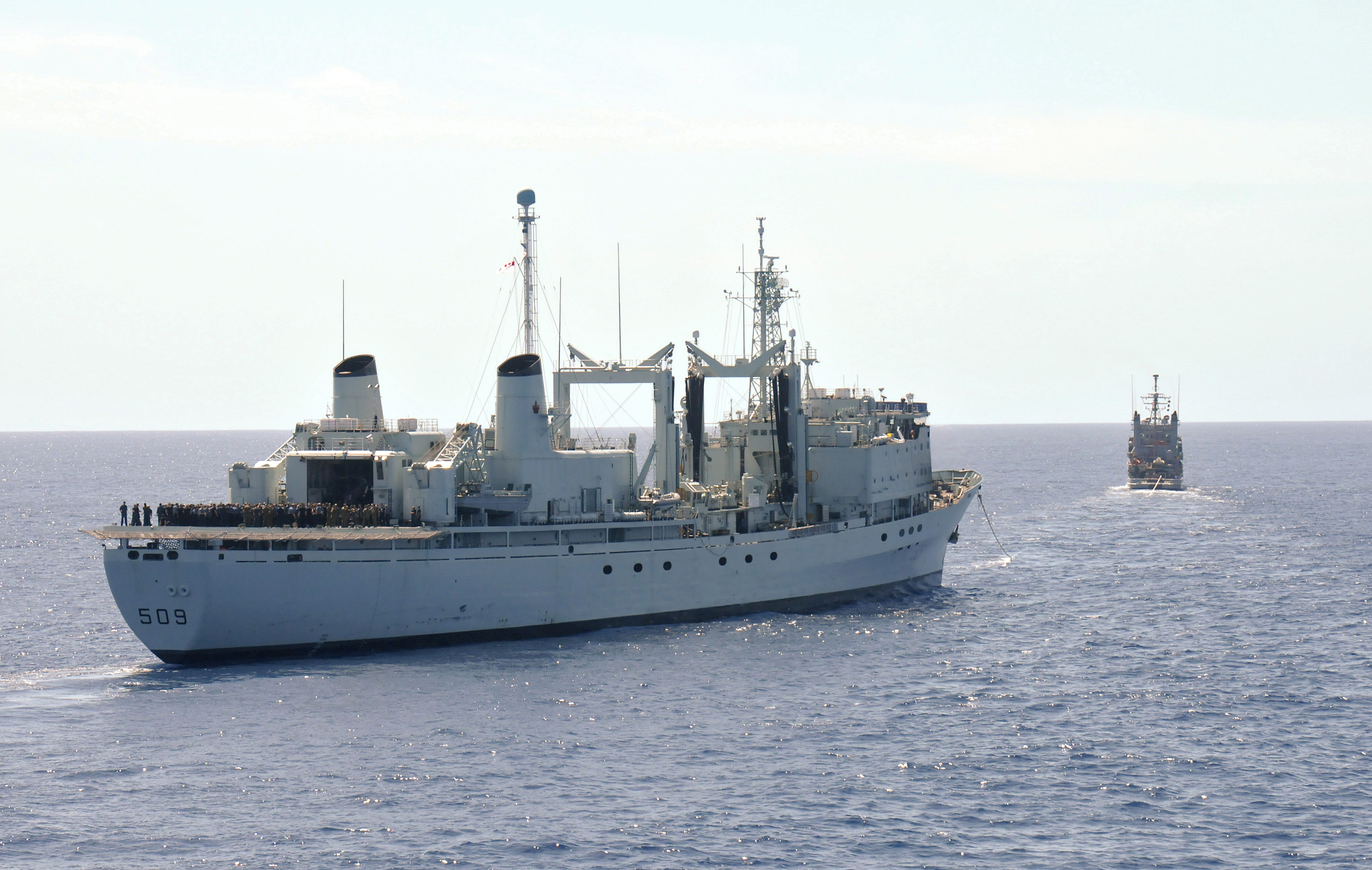
USNS Sioux towing Protecteur in March 2014

On 19 September 2011, Protecteur departed from CFB Esquimalt for a two-month deployment off southern California as part of the USS Abraham Lincoln carrier strike group. Protecteur joined the destroyer Algonquin and the frigate Ottawa in Fleet Week activities in San Diego, California, between 26 and 30 September 2011. On 30 August 2013, the ship was involved in a collision with Algonquin during towing exercises. There were no injuries to personnel, although Protecteur sustained damage to her bow. The damage was repaired in time for Protecteur to participate in a Task Group Exercise with the United States Navy in mid-October 2013.

On 27 February 2014, Protecteur suffered an engine room fire and breakdown 340 nautical miles (630 km; 390 mi) northeast of Pearl Harbor, Hawaii. She was moving at limited speeds and the United States Navy Arleigh Burke-class destroyer Michael Murphy, Ticonderoga-class cruiser Chosin, and the Military Sealift Command-operated Powhatan-class tugboat Sioux were dispatched to assist. Chosin attempted to tow Protecteur, but the towing line broke. About 20 members of the ship's crew were injured as a result of the fire, and her engines were badly damaged. After a preliminary assessment, it was decided that the vessel could not be repaired in Pearl Harbor. On 16 May, Protecteur left Pearl Harbor under tow from the United States Military Sealift Command-operated Safeguard-class rescue and salvage ship Salvor for an expected three week journey to her home port of CFB Esquimalt. Protecteur was delivered to Esquimalt on 31 May 2014.

== Retirement and interim replacement ==
Protecteur was decommissioned at a farewell ceremony on 14 May 2015. Plans for replacing Protecteur and her sister ship, Preserver, were first brought up in 2004. Lack of spare parts for the ship's boiler and the fact that she is a single-skinned tanker were the main driving points to replacing Protecteur and Preserver.

It had been planned that the ship would have continued to operate until 2015; however, the Joint Support Ship Project would not have been completed until two years later, leaving a gap in the ability of the RCN to refuel and resupply her own ships while deployed. Following extensive damage as a result of a fire in February 2014, Protecteur's decommissioning was brought forward as repairs would have been "...too expensive for the navy to consider" given that she was due to be retired in 2017.

On 19 September 2014, Vice-Admiral Mark Norman announced the retirement of Protecteur, along with her sister ship HMCS Preserver and the Iroquois-class destroyers HMCS Iroquois and Algonquin. Protecteur, along with Algonquin, was sold for scrapping on 27 November 2015 to R.J. MacIsaac Ltd. of Antigonish, Nova Scotia. They were towed to Nova Scotia where the work was done at Liverpool.

In October 2015, MS Asterix, a container ship, was acquired by Davie Shipyards to be converted into an auxiliary vessel, to be leased to the RCN as a temporary bridge between the Protecteur class until the new AOR class becomes available. That ship was converted and was delivered to the Royal Canadian Navy as MV Asterix on 6 December 2017. On 10 March 2017, ex-Protecteur caught fire while being dismantled in Liverpool, Nova Scotia. Residual fuel caught fire during demolition of the vessel.

== New class and future service ==
On 12 September 2017 Vice Admiral Ron Lloyd, commander of the Royal Canadian Navy, announced that the new Joint Support Ships would no longer be named for battles of the War of 1812. Originally to be named Queenston and Chateauguay, the Joint Support Ships will instead be named Protecteur and Preserver, perpetuating the names of the former Protecteur class.

== See also ==
- HMCS Provider (AOR 508) the predecessor to Protecteur
