= HMCS Preserver (AOR 510) =

Replenishment oiler of the Royal Canadian Navy

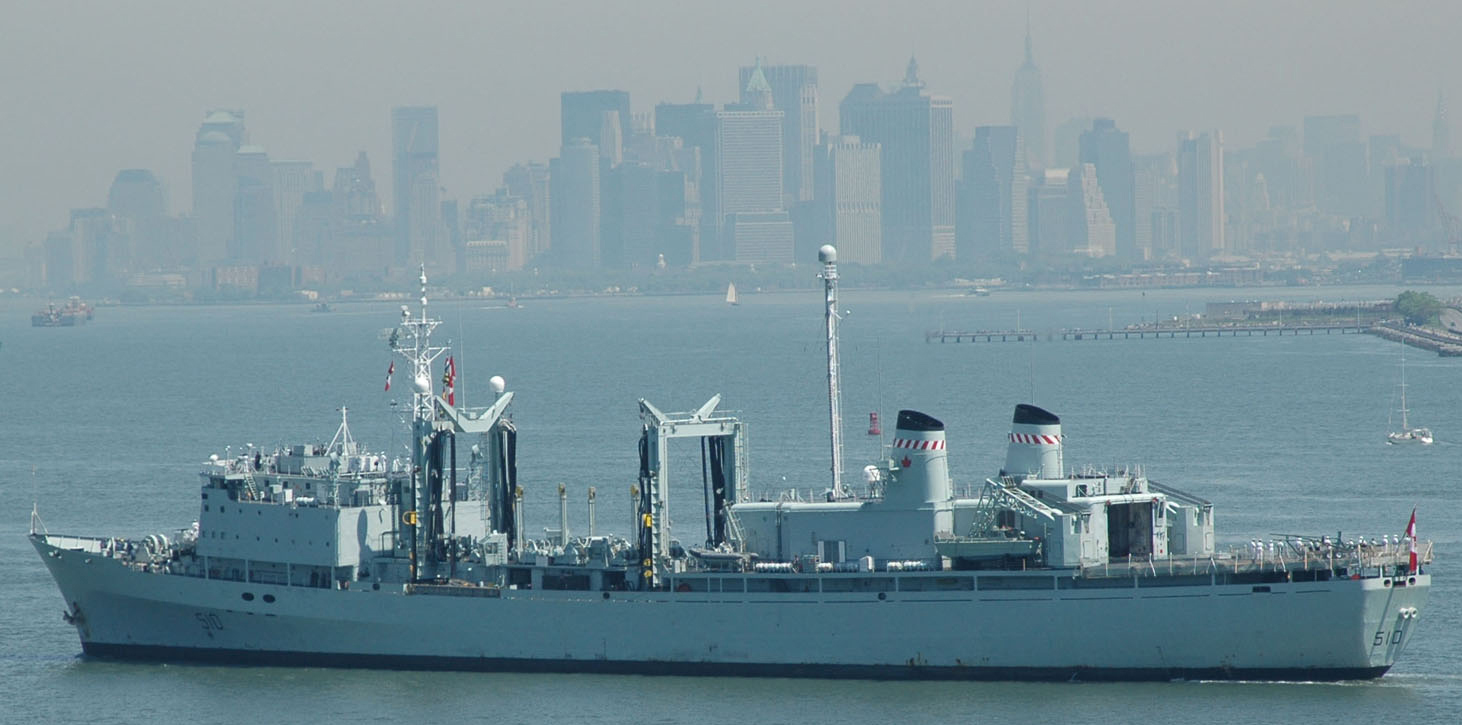
- HMCS Preserver during New York fleet week 2009

History

Canada
- Name: Preserver
- Ordered: early 1960s
- Builder: Saint John Shipbuilding
- Laid down: 17 October 1967
- Launched: 29 May 1969
- Commissioned: 7 August 1970
- Decommissioned: 21 October 2016
- Identification: Hull number: AOR 510; IMO number: 6918546; Callsign: CGRG
- Motto: Le Coeur de la Flotte; ("The Heart of the Fleet")
- Honours and awards: Arabian Sea
- Fate: Scrapped
- Badge: Azure a life preserver Argent cabled Or charged on the centre chief point with a maple leaf slipped Gules and within the ring a starburst also Argent.

General characteristics
- Class & type: Protecteur-class replenishment oiler
- Displacement: 24,550 t (24,162 long tons) full load
- Length: 172 m (564 ft 4 in)
- Beam: 23 m (75 ft 6 in)
- Draught: 10 m (32 ft 10 in)
- Propulsion: 2 × Babcock & Wilcox boilers; 1 × General Electric steam turbine engine
- Speed: 20 knots (37 km/h; 23 mph)
- Complement: 290 officers and crew including air detachment when embarked
- Armament: 2 × 20 mm Phalanx CIWS; 6 × M2HB .50 cal (12.7 mm) HMGs
- Aircraft carried: 3 × CH-124 Sea King helicopters
- Aviation facilities: aft deck hangar and flight deck

HMCS Preserver was a Protecteur-class auxiliary oiler replenishment of the Royal Canadian Navy commissioned in 1970. Built at Saint John, New Brunswick, and launched in 1969, the vessel took part in several overseas deployments, including Operation Deliverance, which became better known as the Somalia Affair. The ship underwent a major refit in 2005, after she was plagued by electrical problems. With these difficulties unresolved, Preserver was withdrawn from sea-going service in 2014 and was paid off on 21 October 2016. The vessel was broken up for scrap at Sydney, Nova Scotia in 2017.

== Service history ==
Preserver, the second Protecteur-class auxiliary replenishment oiler, was built by Saint John Shipbuilding at Saint John, New Brunswick. Commissioned at Saint John on 7 August 1970, she was assigned to the east coast fleet. She was the second ship to bear the name Preserver. Commissioned 11 July 1942, the first HMCS Preserver served in the Second World War as a Fairmile motor launch base supply ship under the East Coast's Newfoundland Force and was paid off 6 November 1945.

In 1971 she carried the Governor General of Canada, Roland Michener to Europe, hosting the heads of state of Belgium and Netherlands. In June of that year, the ship took part in the first-ever refueling of a hydrofoil at sea, replenishing HMCS Bras d'Or. As part of Canada's contribution to the UN peacekeeping force in Cyprus, Preserver supported Canadian troops through 1974–75. The ship served Canada's fleet in domestic and international exercises in the 1980s and 1990s.

On 12 September 1988, HMS Penelope, a Leander-class frigate of the Royal Navy, suffered a machinery breakdown, changed course rapidly to port and collided with the starboard side of the ship during a replenishment. Penelope caught Preserver's starboard anchor, cutting her port side open. The ship suffered $260,000 damage, while Penelope suffered damage estimated in the millions.

In December 1992, she took part in Operation Deliverance, the ill-fated Canadian Forces operation that turned into the Somalia Affair. In 1994, Preserver was part of the multinational force enforcing sanctions on the former Yugoslavia. The vessel returned to that force in May–June 1995. In September 1998, she was part of the Canadian naval response to the crash of Swissair Flight 111 off the coast of Nova Scotia. The ship sailed for Afghanistan in October 2001, as part of Operation Apollo, Canada's initial response to the Global War on Terrorism. She returned from that duty in April 2002.

Preserver underwent a $40 million refit in 2005, focusing on structure and propulsion. However, electrical problems remained unresolved for both ships in the class. In 2010 while refueling she spilled several cubic metres of fuel in Halifax harbour. The spill, which comprised 14,000 litres (3,100 imp gal; 3,700 US gal) of diesel oil, was caused by a faulty drainage pipe that had not been properly inspected following a 2010 refit. The spill was contained by the navy before causing damage to the harbour itself. On 4 November 2011, after returning from sea trials, the ship smashed into a dock in Halifax harbour, suffering damage above the waterline on the starboard bow. The commanding officer of the ship was later removed from his post as a result of the crash. The cost of the repairs to the damage sustained during the incident was $497,442.

== Retirement ==
On 19 September 2014, Vice-Admiral Mark Norman announced the retirement of Preserver, along with sister ship Protecteur and the Iroquois-class destroyers Iroquois and Algonquin. In addition to the problems with the electrical system, corrosion problems extending beyond general wear and tear were found on Preserver. The Royal Canadian Navy was looking at other options to fill the supply gap until the arrival of the two Protecteur-class auxiliary vessels. MV Asterix, a container ship, was converted by Davie Shipbuilding to an auxiliary replenishment vessel and entered service with the Royal Canadian Navy in January 2018.

No longer able to sail at sea, Preserver ceased providing fuelling service for the Atlantic Fleet at Halifax. The ship was paid off on 21 October 2016 at Halifax. Contractors to dismantle Preserver, along with CFAV Quest, were sought in March 2017. In June Marine Recycling Corporation of Port Colborne, Ontario secured a CAD$12.6 million contract to dismantle the two ships and Preserver arrived at their Sydport facility at Sydney, Nova Scotia on 2 August. Preserver was subsequently dismantled and recycled for scrap.
