= HMCS Ottawa (FFH 341) =

Royal Canadian Navy frigate

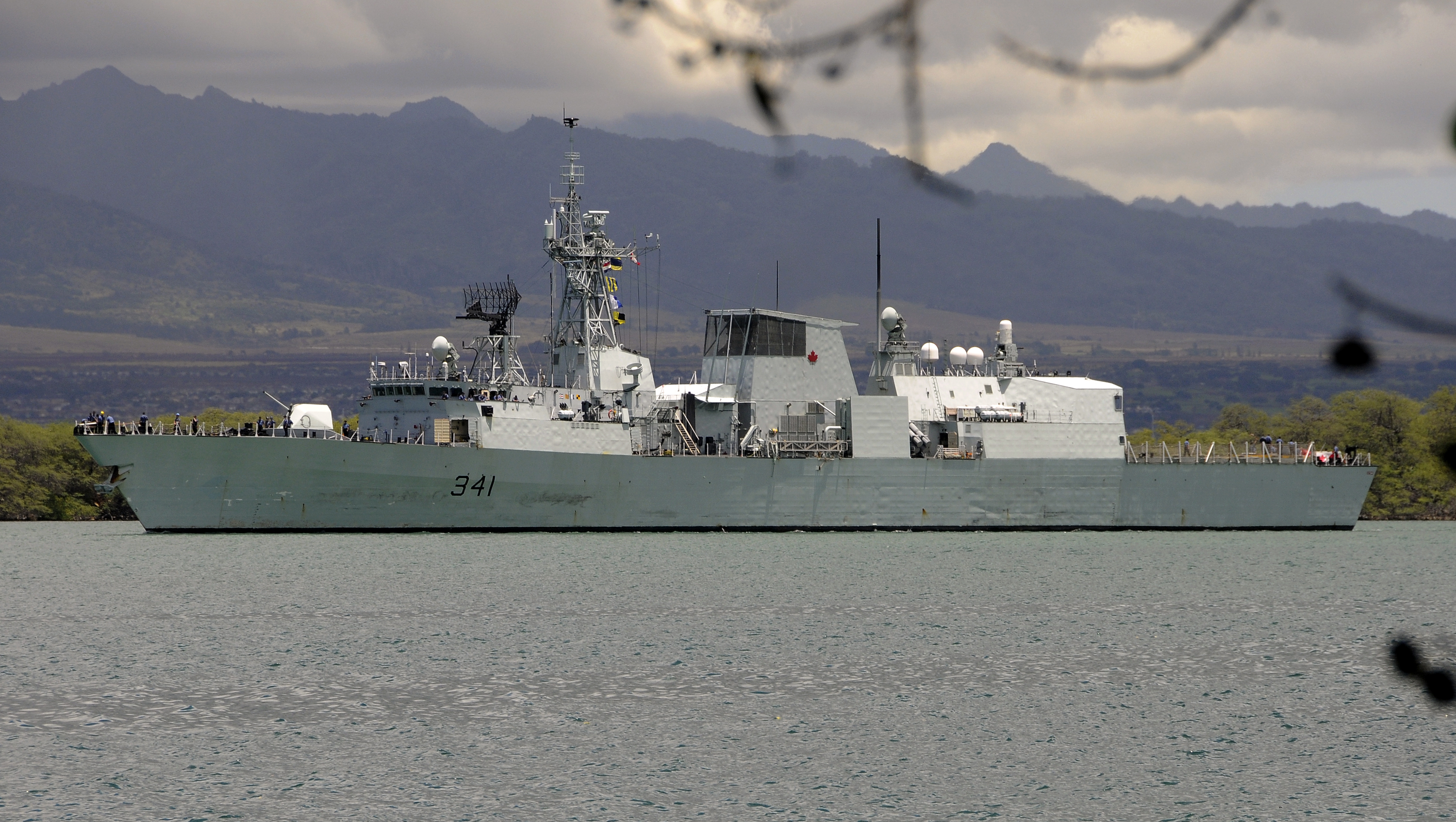
- HMCS Ottawa departs Naval Station Pearl Harbor

History

Canada
- Name: Ottawa
- Namesake: Ottawa, Ontario
- Builder: Saint John Shipbuilding Ltd., Saint John
- Laid down: 29 April 1995
- Launched: 31 May 1996
- Commissioned: 28 September 1996
- Home port: CFB Esquimalt
- Identification: Pennant number: FFH 341; MMSI number: 316195000; Callsign: CGAL
- Motto: Egor Beofor (Ocean Beaver)
- Honours and awards: Atlantic, 1939–1945; Normandy, 1944; English Channel, 1944; Biscay, 1944; Arabian Sea
- Status: in active service
- Notes: Colours: white and red
- Badge: Gules, a bend wavy argent charged with two cotises wavy azure, over all a beaver or, the sinister forepaw resting on a log of silver birch proper.

General characteristics
- Class & type: Halifax-class frigate
- Displacement: 3,995 tonnes (light); 4,795 tonnes (operational); 5,032 tonnes (deep load)
- Length: 134.2 m (440 ft)
- Beam: 16.5 m (54 ft)
- Draught: 7.1 m (23 ft)
- Propulsion: 2 × LM2500 gas turbines; 1 × SEMT Pielstick diesel engine
- Speed: 30 knots (56 km/h; 35 mph)
- Range: 9,500 nmi (17,600 km; 10,900 mi)
- Complement: 255 (including air detachment)
- Armament: Missiles; 2 × quad Mk 141 canisters for 8 × RGM-84 Harpoon block II AShM/LAM; 2 × 8-cell Mk 48 vertical launch system firing 16 × RIM-162 Evolved Sea Sparrow block II SAM/SSM; Guns; 1 × Bofors 57 mm Mk3 gun; 1 × Phalanx CIWS Mk 15 Mod 21 block 1B; 4 × .50-calibre M2HQ Mini Typhoon NRWS; Torpedoes; 2 × twin 324 mm (12.8 in) Mk 32 torpedo tubes for 24 × Honeywell Mk 46 Mod 5 torpedoes
- Aircraft carried: 1 × CH-148 Cyclone

HMCS Ottawa is a Royal Canadian Navy Halifax-class frigate. Ottawa is the twelfth and final ship of the Halifax class that were built as part of the Canadian Patrol Frigate Project. She is the fourth vessel to carry the name HMCS Ottawa. The first three were named for the Ottawa River. This ship is the first named for Canada's national capital, the City of Ottawa. She is assigned to Maritime Forces Pacific (MARPAC) and is homeported at HMC Dockyard, CFB Esquimalt. Ottawa serves on MARPAC missions protecting Canada's sovereignty in the Pacific Ocean and enforcing Canadian laws in its territorial sea and Exclusive Economic Zone. Ottawa has also been deployed on missions throughout the Pacific and to the Indian Ocean; specifically the Persian Gulf and Arabian Sea on anti-terrorism operations.

== Description and design ==
The Halifax-class frigate design, emerging from the Canadian Patrol Frigate Project, was ordered by the Canadian Forces in 1977 as a replacement for the aging St. Laurent, Restigouche, Mackenzie, and Annapolis classes of destroyer escorts, which were all tasked with anti-submarine warfare. Ottawa was ordered in December 1987 as part of the second batch of frigates. To reflect the changing long term strategy of the Navy during the 1980s and 1990s, the Halifax-class frigates were designed as a general purpose warship with particular focus on anti-submarine capabilities.

As built, the Halifax-class vessels displaced 4,750 long tons (4,830 t) and were 134.65 metres (441 ft 9 in) long overall and 124.49 metres (408 ft 5 in) between perpendiculars with a beam of 16.36 metres (53 ft 8 in) and a draught of 4.98 metres (16 ft 4 in). That made them slightly larger than the Iroquois-class destroyers. The vessels are propelled by two shafts with Escher Wyss controllable pitch propellers driven by a CODOG system of two General Electric LM2500 gas turbines, generating 47,500 shaft horsepower (35,400 kW) and one SEMT Pielstick 20 PA6 V 280 diesel engine, generating 8,800 shaft horsepower (6,600 kW).

This gives the frigates a maximum speed of 29 knots (54 km/h; 33 mph) and a range of 7,000 nautical miles (13,000 km; 8,100 mi) at 15 knots (28 km/h; 17 mph) while using their diesel engines. Using their gas turbines, the ships have a range of 3,930 nautical miles (7,280 km; 4,520 mi) at 18 knots (33 km/h; 21 mph). The Halifax class have a complement of 198 naval personnel of which 17 are officers and 17 aircrew of which 8 are officers.

=== Armament and aircraft ===
As built the Halifax class vessels deployed the CH-124 Sea King helicopter, which acted in concert with shipboard sensors to seek out and destroy submarines at long distances from the ships. The ships have a helicopter deck fitted with a "bear trap" system allowing the launch and recovery of helicopters in up to sea state 6. The Halifax class also carries a close-in anti-submarine weapon in the form of the Mark 46 torpedo, launched from twin Mark 32 Mod 9 torpedo tubes in launcher compartments either side of the forward end of the helicopter hangar.

As built, the anti-shipping role is supported by the RGM-84 Harpoon Block 1C surface-to-surface missile, mounted in two quadruple launch tubes at the main deck level between the funnel and the helicopter hangar. For anti-aircraft self-defence the ships are armed with the Sea Sparrow vertical launch surface-to-air missile in two Mk 48 Mod 0 eight-cell launchers placed to port and starboard of the funnel. The vessels carry 16 missiles. A Raytheon/General Dynamics Phalanx Mark 15 Mod 21 Close-In Weapon System (CIWS) is mounted on top of the helicopter hangar for "last-ditch" defence against targets that evade the Sea Sparrow.

As built, the main gun on the forecastle is a 57 mm (2.2 in)/70 calibre Mark 2 gun from Bofors. (Note: The 70 calibre denotes the length of the gun. This means that the length of the gun barrel is 70 times the bore diameter.) The gun is capable of firing 2.4-kilogram (5.3 lb) shells at a rate of 220 rounds per minute at a range of more than 17 kilometres (11 mi). The vessels also carry eight 12.7 mm (0.50 in) machine guns.

=== Countermeasures and sensors ===
As built, the decoy system comprises Two BAE Systems Shield Mark 2 decoy launchers which fire chaff to 2 kilometres (1.2 mi) and infrared rockets to 169 metres (185 yd) in distraction, confusion and centroid seduction modes. The torpedo decoy is the AN/SLQ-25A Nixie towed acoustic decoy from Argon ST. The ship's radar warning receiver, the CANEWS (Canadian Electronic Warfare System), SLQ-501, and the radar jammer, SLQ-505, were developed by Thorn and Lockheed Martin Canada.

Two Thales Nederland (formerly Signaal) SPG-503 (STIR 1.8) fire control radars are installed one on the bridge-top and one on a raised radar platform on the forward end of the helicopter hangar. The ship is also fitted with Raytheon AN/SPS-49(V)5 long-range active air search radar operating in C and D bands, Ericsson HC150 Sea Giraffe medium-range air and surface search radar operating in G and H bands, and Kelvin Hughes Type 1007 I-band navigation radar. The sonar suite includes the CANTASS Canadian Towed Array and GD-C AN/SQS-510 hull mounted sonar and incorporates an acoustic range prediction system. The sonobuoy processing system is the GD-C AN/UYS-503.

=== Modernization ===
The Halifax class underwent a modernization program, known as the Halifax Class Modernization (HCM) program, in order to update the frigates' capabilities in combatting modern smaller, faster and more mobile threats. This involved upgrading the command and control, radar, communications, electronic warfare and armament systems. Further improvements, such as modifying the vessel to accommodate the new Sikorsky CH-148 Cyclone helicopter and satellite links will be done separately from the main Frigate Equipment Life Extension (FELEX) program.

The FELEX program comprised upgrading the combat systems integration to CMS330. The SPS-49 2D long range air search radar was replaced by the Thales Nederland SMART-S Mk 2 E/F-band 3D surveillance radar, and the two STIR 1.8 fire control radars were replaced by a pair of Saab Ceros 200 re-control radars. A Telephonics IFF Mode 5/S interrogator was installed and the Elisra NS9003A-V2HC ESM system replaced the SLQ-501 CANEWS. An IBM multi-link (Link 11, Link 16 and Link 22 enabled) datalink processing system was installed along with two Raytheon Anschütz Pathfinder Mk II navigation radars. Furthermore, Rheinmetall's Multi-Ammunition Soft kill System (MASS), known as MASS DUERAS was introduced to replace the Plessey Shield decoy system. The existing 57 mm Mk 2 guns were upgraded to the Mk 3 standard and the Harpoon missiles were improved to Block II levels, the Phalanx CIWS was upgraded to Block 1B and the obsolete Sea Sparrow system was replaced by the Evolved Sea Sparrow Missile.

== Construction and career ==
Ottawa was laid down on 29 April 1995 by Saint John Shipbuilding Ltd. at Saint John and launched on 31 May 1996. The frigate was commissioned on 28 September 1996 at Cornwall, Ontario and carries the hull classification symbol FFH 341. At the time of her commissioning, the commanding officer was Commander Gilles Goulet.

After commissioning, Ottawa, accompanied by the Kingston-class coastal defence vessel Nanaimo, transferred to the West Coast, departing Halifax, Nova Scotia on 16 November 1996. Ottawa deployed in June 1998 as part of the USS Abraham Lincoln Carrier Battle Group in the Persian Gulf as part of the United Nations embargo on Iraq. This made the frigate the first Canadian vessel to completely integrate with an American battle group. In February 2002, the warship was assigned to Operation Apollo, the Canadian contribution to the War in Afghanistan, returning 17 August.

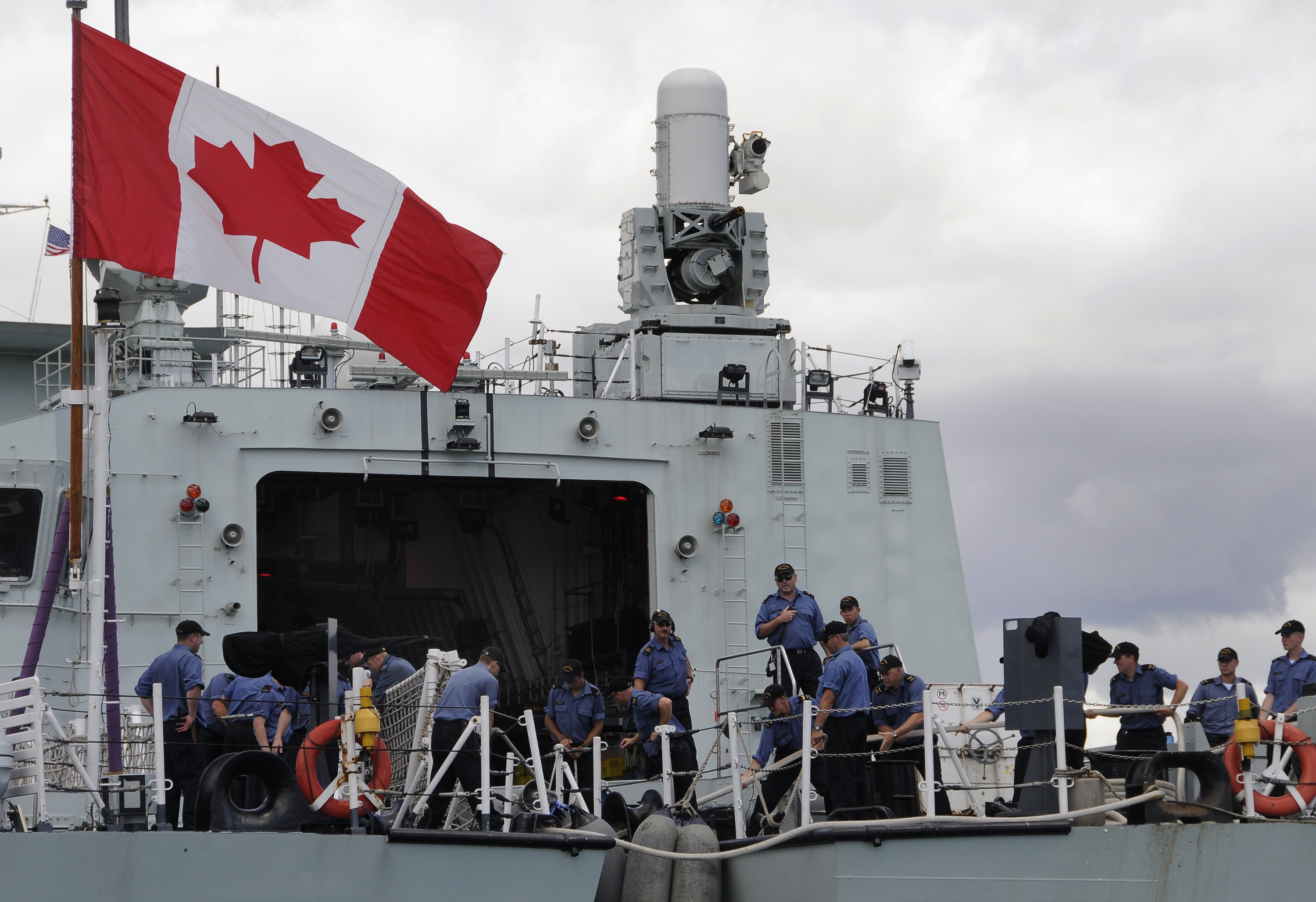
Canadian sailors aboard the Halifax-class frigate HMCS Ottawa handle mooring lines.

On 6 June 2011, Ottawa began a four-and-a-half-month training deployment and goodwill tour in the Pacific which included port visits to Australia, South Korea, Singapore, and Japan. Ottawa participated with the Royal Australian Navy and United States Seventh Fleet in the multi-lateral naval exercise Operation Talisman Saber 2011 from 11 to 26 July 2011. Ottawa subsequently operated in the U.S. Navy's Carrier Strike Group Nine and participated in Fleet Week activities in San Diego, California, between 26 September and 30 September 2011. The warship returned to its home base of Esquimalt, British Columbia, on 13 October 2011.

On 12 December 2011, Commander Scott Van Will became the commanding officer of Ottawa. Ottawa began working up for the next year of activity in January 2012. This began with directed workups and various training activities leading up to the larger RIMPAC sail in the summer. Training included new firefighting equipment use, Fleet Navigation Officer Training, and Air Detachment integration. There was also a stop in Port McNeill and Alert Bay to visit local schools.

The ship was scheduled to join the Iroquois-class destroyer HMCS Algonquin, and the Victoria-class submarine HMCS Victoria for the Rim of the Pacific (RIMPAC) exercise. RIMPAC 2012 took place from 27 June to 3 August 2012. It is a biannual, multi-national maritime exercise held off the coast of Hawaii and is designed to improve interoperability and understanding between military forces from nations with an interest in the Pacific Rim, increasing stability in the region.

In June 2013, Ottawa received a new commanding officer, Commander Julian Barnard.

In July 2015, Sylvain Belair took command of HMCS Ottawa. On 25 August 2016, Ottawa rescued the crew from the burning fishing vessel Sherry C which had been trying to tow the disabled fishing vessel Tryon back to port off the British Columbia Coast. No one was hurt in the event and the disabled fishing vessels were turned over to the Canadian Coast Guard when they arrived on the scene. Ottawa and sister ship Winnipeg sailed from Esquimalt on 6 March 2017 for six-month deployment visiting several nations around the Pacific, including Malaysia, India, China and Japan among others, returning on 8 August.

In June and July 2018, Ottawa, along with sister ship Vancouver and the supply ship Asterix, took part in RIMPAC 2018 around the Hawaiian Islands. In February 2019, Ottawa left Esquimalt for a month-long deployment training with the US Navy. On 6 August, Ottawa sailed for a six-month deployment to Asian-Pacific waters which included enforcing United Nations sanctions against North Korea. On 12 September 2019, Ottawa sailed through the Taiwan Strait while en route to the sanctions enforcement area. On 19 December, the frigate returned to Esquimalt after four months in the Asia-Pacific region.

In 2023, Ottawa was deployed to Japan to participate in military exercises with the American and Japanese navies. After departing Japan, Ottawa had three encounters with Chinese warships in the East China Sea, including a close encounter with the destroyer Luyang. Ottawa returned to Esquimalt in December.

In October 2024, Ottawa departed CFB Esquimalt for a deployment of Asian waters as Canada's contribution to the multi-national Operation Horizon. On 26 December, Ottawa completed a mission to conduct anti-smuggling operations related to North Korea from late November to mid-December. While in the midst of the deployment, it was reported on 7 February 2025, the vessel's commanding officer was relieved of command as part of ensuring effective leadership.
