= Operation Deliverance =

1992 Canadian operation in Somalia

- Part of Somali Civil War
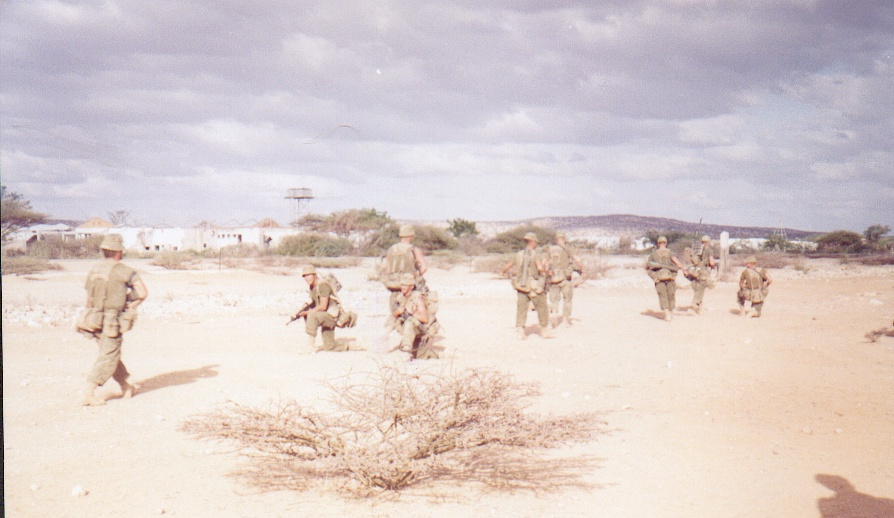
- Canadian soldiers in Somalia, 1992
Date	December 1992 – May 1993
Location	Somalia
Result	Canadian forces achieve military objectives, but certain members behave criminally, and the forces suffer severe political repercussions.: Somalia affair; Disbanding of the Canadian Airborne Regiment

Belligerents
Canada	United Somali Congress

Commanders and leaders
Brian Mulroney; John de Chastelain	Mohamed 'Tiger' I. Barre

Units involved
Canadian Airborne Regiment	

Strength
1,400 troops; 1 helicopter squadron; 1 HMCS Preserver naval ship	Unknown

Casualties and losses
1 killed (friendly fire)	≥4

Operation Deliverance was a Canadian military operation in Somalia that formed part of the United Nations peace-making deployment to that country during the early part of the Somali Civil War. The mission began on December 3, 1992, and involved about 1,400 Canadian troops, a helicopter unit and the supply ship HMCS Preserver.

While Canada's mission objectives were largely completed, including the freeing of a captured Canadian journalist and the defeat of the Somali warlord Mohamed 'Tiger' I. Barre, Operation Deliverance turned into a political disaster for the Canadian Forces after several Somali civilians were brutally killed or injured in what became known as the Somalia Affair. The Somalia Affair was largely responsible for the disbandment of the Canadian Airborne Regiment in 1995 and additionally resulted in numerous dismissals and resignations along the chain of command up to, but not including, the Minister of Defence.

One Canadian soldier died during the mission, Corporal Michael David Abel of the Canadian Airborne Regiment. He was killed when a rifle being cleaned by a fellow soldier discharged accidentally.

== See also ==
- Canadian Airborne Regiment
- Somali Civil War
- Somalia Affair
