= HMCS Algonquin =

Two Canadian naval ships have been named HMCS Algonquin:

- HMCS Algonquin (R17) was a V-class destroyer active from 1944 to 1970. She was scrapped in 1971.
- HMCS Algonquin (DDG 283) was an Iroquois-class destroyer active from 1973 to 2015. She was scrapped in 2016.

== Battle honours ==
Ships named Algonquin have earned the following battle honours;

- Norway, 1944
- Normandy, 1944
- Arctic, 1944–45
- Arabian Sea
