= Protecteur-class auxiliary vessel =

Class of Canadian oiler replenishment ships

Class overview
- Name: Protecteur class
- Builders: Seaspan ULC, North Vancouver
- Operators: Royal Canadian Navy
- Preceded by: Protecteur class
- Cost: CA$2.6 billion (2015 estimate);$4.1bn (2020 estimate)
- Planned: 2
- Building: 2
- Completed: 1 (Fitting out)

General characteristics
- Type: Joint support ship
- Displacement: 20,240 t (19,920 long tons)
- Length: 173.7 m (569 ft 11 in)
- Beam: 24 m (78 ft 9 in)
- Height: 17.5 m (57 ft 5 in)
- Draught: 7.4 m (24 ft 3 in)
- Propulsion: 2 × MAN 12V32/44CR propulsion engines; 2 × propulsion shafts; 1 × bow thruster; 4 × MAN diesel generators
- Speed: 20 knots (37 km/h; 23 mph)
- Range: 10,895 nmi (20,178 km; 12,538 mi) at 15 knots (28 km/h; 17 mph)
- Boats & landing craft carried: 2 × Ship-to-Shore Connector pontoon systems
- Complement: 199 core crew; 239 with 2 × air detachments
- Sensors & processing systems: Command & control; Lockheed Martin Canada CMS 330 Combat System; OSI Maritime Systems Integrated Navigation and Tactical System (INTS); Rhode & Schwartz Communications Systems; Surveillance & weapon sensors; Saab Sea Giraffe AMB
- Armament: 2 × Phalanx CIWS; 4 × .50-calibre RWS
- Aircraft carried: 2 × CH-148 Cyclone each armed with: 2 × Mk 54 MAKO Torpedo; 1 × C6 FLEX 7.62 mm (0.300 in) GPMG
- Aviation facilities: Hangar and flight deck capable of holding Chinook size helicopters

The Protecteur class (formerly known as the Queenston class) of naval auxiliaries for the Royal Canadian Navy (RCN) began as the Joint Support Ship Project, a Government of Canada procurement project for the RCN that is part of the National Shipbuilding Procurement Strategy. It will see the RCN acquire two multi-role vessels to replace the earlier Protecteur-class auxiliary oiler replenishment vessels. As of September 2025, "due to continued challenges associated with outfitting a first-in-class, complex warship." it is now expected that the first of the two ships will be delivered and commissioned into the RCN in 2027 and the second delivered by 2027/2028.

The project has suffered from considerable delays. Originally announced in 2004, a contract for the construction of these ships was planned to be signed in 2009, with the first vessel available for operational service in 2012. In 2010, the federal government incorporated the project into the National Shipbuilding Strategy.

On 2 June 2013, ThyssenKrupp Marine Systems Berlin-class replenishment ship serving with the German Navy was selected. The Canadian vessels will be a variant of the Berlin class, built at Seaspan's yard in North Vancouver, British Columbia.

Initial construction work began in 2018, but a formal contract for the construction of both ships was only signed in June 2020.

In order to speed construction of the Protecteur-class naval auxiliaries, the delivery of the first of the new class of polar icebreakers, CCGS Imnaryuaq, will be delayed until at least 2030.

== Class name ==
On 25 October 2013, the Minister of National Defence named the JSS the Queenston class with two ships named, HMCS Queenston and Châteauguay. Their namesakes were battles of the War of 1812, Queenston Heights and Châteauguay. A name was also chosen for a possible third ship in the class, HMCS Crysler's Farm, named after the Battle of Crysler's Farm. The option for the third vessel was dropped due to budget constraints.

On 12 September 2017, the new Liberal government renamed the vessels, taking the names of the ships of the class that they are to replace. Queenston became Protecteur and Châteauguay became Preserver. According to Vice-Admiral Ron Lloyd, commander of the RCN, this was due to the ties both serving and former navy personnel had with the names.

== Purpose ==
The Joint Support Ship Project consists of two multi-role vessels that will replace the former underway replenishment capability of the earlier Protecteur-class auxiliary vessel, as well as provide basic sealift for the Canadian Army, support to forces ashore, and command facilities for a Canadian Forces "joint force" or "naval task group".

The Joint Support Ship Project should not be confused with the Amphibious Assault Ship Project, which was a proposed separate procurement project that never advanced beyond the concept stage.

== Proposed ship capabilities ==
As of 2010, the Joint Support Ship Project envisioned several multi-role vessels capable of supporting the Royal Canadian Navy's warships at sea, as well as providing strategic sealift and some airlift for naval task groups or army operations. The vessels were envisaged as having a multi-purpose covered deck with the ability to carry up to 10,000 tonnes of ship fuel, 1,300 tonnes of aviation fuel, 1,100 tonnes of ammunition as well as 1,000–1,500 lane metres of deck space for carrying vehicles and containerized cargo. The vessels were also to have hospital facilities as well as a large helicopter deck with two landing spots, hangar space for four helicopters, and a roll-on/roll-off deck for vehicles onto a dock. The actual capabilities have been listed as being able to carry 64 twenty-foot equivalent units of shipping containers, which can be used to store food, water, vehicles, and other specialized equipment to support land or sea-based operations, including humanitarian aid or disaster relief. Additionally, these containers can house special mission fit cargo, such as mobile hospitals and portable communication centers, which could be offloaded or airlifted ashore. Holds up to 6,875 tons of F76 marine fuel, 1,037 tons of F44 aviation fuel, an onboard hospital with surgical and dental facilities.

=== Particulars of the Berlin-class design ===
The Berlin-class design ultimately selected incorporated somewhat modified components:

- Ability to transport 9,600 cubic metres (2,100,000 imp gal) of fuel, 550 cubic metres (120,000 imp gal) of water, 160 tonnes (160 long tons; 180 short tons) of ammunition, 280 tonnes (280 long tons; 310 short tons) of food, 100 tonnes (98 long tons; 110 short tons) of dry stores and 32 containers.
- Ship fitted with replenishment-at-sea (RAS) systems and accommodates up to two helicopters. The loading and offloading of cargo is carried out by two 24-ton cranes.
- The modular hospital of the Berlin class has 45 beds for general patients and four for intensive care (including hospital ward).

The Canadian variant of the Berlin class may incorporate additional modifications from the original design.

=== Survivability ===
- Self-defence active and passive
- Damaged stability enhanced two-compartment
- Degaussing, Nixie torpedo decoy, protection against chemical, biological, radiological and nuclear threats, close-in weapons systems and naval remote weapon system.

=== Airlift ===
- Two CH-148 Cyclone helicopters
- Enclosed hangar with maintenance and repair facilities

Vessels will be designed with double hulls for storage of petroleum products, unlike the former Protecteur-class single-hull vessels.

=== Joint headquarters support ===
- Naval communications
- Land communications
- Air communications

== Project timeline ==
In 2004, the federal government started the Joint Support Ship Project. Four consortiums sought the contract, led by Irving Shipbuilding, BAE Systems, ThyssenKrupp Marine Systems Canada, and SNC-Lavalin ProFac. Two design finalists were selected in November 2006: ThyssenKrupp and SNC-Lavalin ProFac with the ships built in either Marystown, Newfoundland and Labrador, or North Vancouver, British Columbia, respectively. A contract for final design and construction was expected in 2008, with the first ship of the class entering service in 2012. In January 2007, Canadian media reported that defence planners were considering the retirement of the existing Protecteur-class ships by 2010, prior to the delivery of the first replacement vessels in 2012. This news was met with criticism as it would leave MARCOM without an underway replenishment capability for two years.

On 22 August 2008, the Minister of Public Works and Government Services, Christian Paradis, terminated two procurement processes involving the shipbuilding industry. In December 2008, RCN officers and defence analysts hoped Budget 2009 would have up to $500 million in extra funding for the Joint Support Ship Project so that it could be completed. However, there was no extra money for the Joint Support Ship Project and the stimulus package did not address MARCOM's vessel procurement programs. Vice-Admiral Denis Rouleau, spoke to the Standing Committee on National Defence in the House of Commons and indicated that the Department of National Defence would know by summer 2009 how it would move ahead with the Joint Support Ship Project.

In June 2009, officials with the Joint Support Ship Project began re-evaluating the type of ship they wished to purchase since the original concept could not be funded. In September 2009, the Joint Support Ship Project received a new design. Vice-Admiral Dean McFadden, Chief of the Maritime Staff, said that he was ready to submit design and cost estimates to the government and to the Minister of National Defence.

In June 2010, the Government of Canada announced that the National Shipbuilding Procurement Strategy (NSPS) would spend CA$35 billion over the next 30 years to purchase 28 new large ships and 116 small vessels for Maritime Command and the Canadian Coast Guard. The NSPS was led by the Department of Public Works and Government Services, with support from Department of Industry, as well as the Department of National Defence and Department of Fisheries and Oceans. In July 2010, Defence Minister Peter MacKay announced an initial purchase of two joint support ships (at a cost of $2.6 billion) with options for a third. On 11 October 2010, the Government of Canada invited five shipbuilding companies "to participate in a request for proposals" for the NSPS.

On 19 October 2011, the Government of Canada announced the award of the $8 billion non-combat ship package, including the Joint Support Ship Project, to Seaspan Marine Corporation in Vancouver, British Columbia.

On 2 June 2013, the Government of Canada selected ThyssenKrupp Marine Systems Canada's Berlin class as the design for the joint support ship. On 11 October 2013, the NSPS Secretariat announced that Vancouver Shipyards would commence construction on the joint support ships, followed by the Polar Icebreaker. It was expected that construction would begin in 2016–17. On 25 October 2013, the Government of Canada named the two ships HMCS Queenston and HMCS Châteauguay in recognition of the significant battles of Queenston Heights and Châteauguay during the War of 1812. However, these names were changed to Protecteur and Preserver respectively on 12 September 2017.

In August 2015 Davie Shipyard signed a contract to convert the container ship MV Asterix for the replenishment role until the joint support ships were delivered. The contract is known as Project Resolve. The vessel was built in 2010 in Germany and was converted for use by the RCN. Construction of the first JSS had been scheduled to begin at the Seaspan Yard in late 2017, following the construction of two other classes of ships for the Canadian Coast Guard.

By 2020, project costs had escalated significantly with an estimated $4.1 billion being required to complete the project. In 2022, delivery of the first ship was delayed until 2025, followed by the second ship in 2027. The updated delivery schedule was uncertain and the entire project budget was again under "review".

In December 2024, Protecteur was launched at Seaspan Shipyards in Vancouver.

== Construction ==
The first of class, Protecteur, is scheduled for a 2027 delivery. Preserver is expected to follow in 2027/2028, though the dates for the operational service entry of both ships remain "under review". Given delays and in an effort to try to speed up the process of building the ships, steel was cut for the ships in 2018 during a lull in the construction of two Canadian Coast Guard science vessels at the yard. On 5 February 2019, it was announced that the construction of the first vessel in the class would be advanced and the ship would be completed at the Seaspan yard ahead of the construction of the planned Offshore Oceanographic Science Vessel (OOSV) for the Canadian Coast Guard. The second vessel would be completed only after the OOSV entered service. The first ship, Protecteur, was formally laid down on 16 January 2020. The formal contract for the construction of both ships was awarded in June 2020.

In March 2021, Seaspan shipyard reported that over 90 percent of the ship blocks for Protecteur were in production. As of December 2021, the assembly of the ship was reported to be complete. Near the end of August 2022, construction was halted by a strike by Seaspan tugboat workers which ended in October, as the shipyard staff would not cross the picket lines that had been set up.

The second ship in the class began construction in 2022 with her keel being formally laid down in October 2023.

=== Ships of class ===
Protecteur class
Name	Hull number	Builder	Laid down	Launched	Commissioned	Homeport	Status
Protecteur	520	Seaspan ULC	16 January 2020	13 December 2024	Projected 2026	(TBD)	Fitting out
Preserver	521	Seaspan ULC	27 October 2023	(TBD)	Projected 2027	(TBD)	Under construction

== See also ==
- Arctic Patrol Ship Project
- Amphibious Assault Ship Project
- MV Asterix – Interim oiler for the Royal Canadian Navy from 2018 to present.
- Almirante Montt – Chilean supply vessel rented by the RCN to use on the Pacific Coast for 40 sea days each year from 2015 to 2017.
- Patiño and Cantabria were loaned from Spanish Navy in 2016 on the Atlantic Coast.
