= Ron Lloyd =

Canadian navy officer

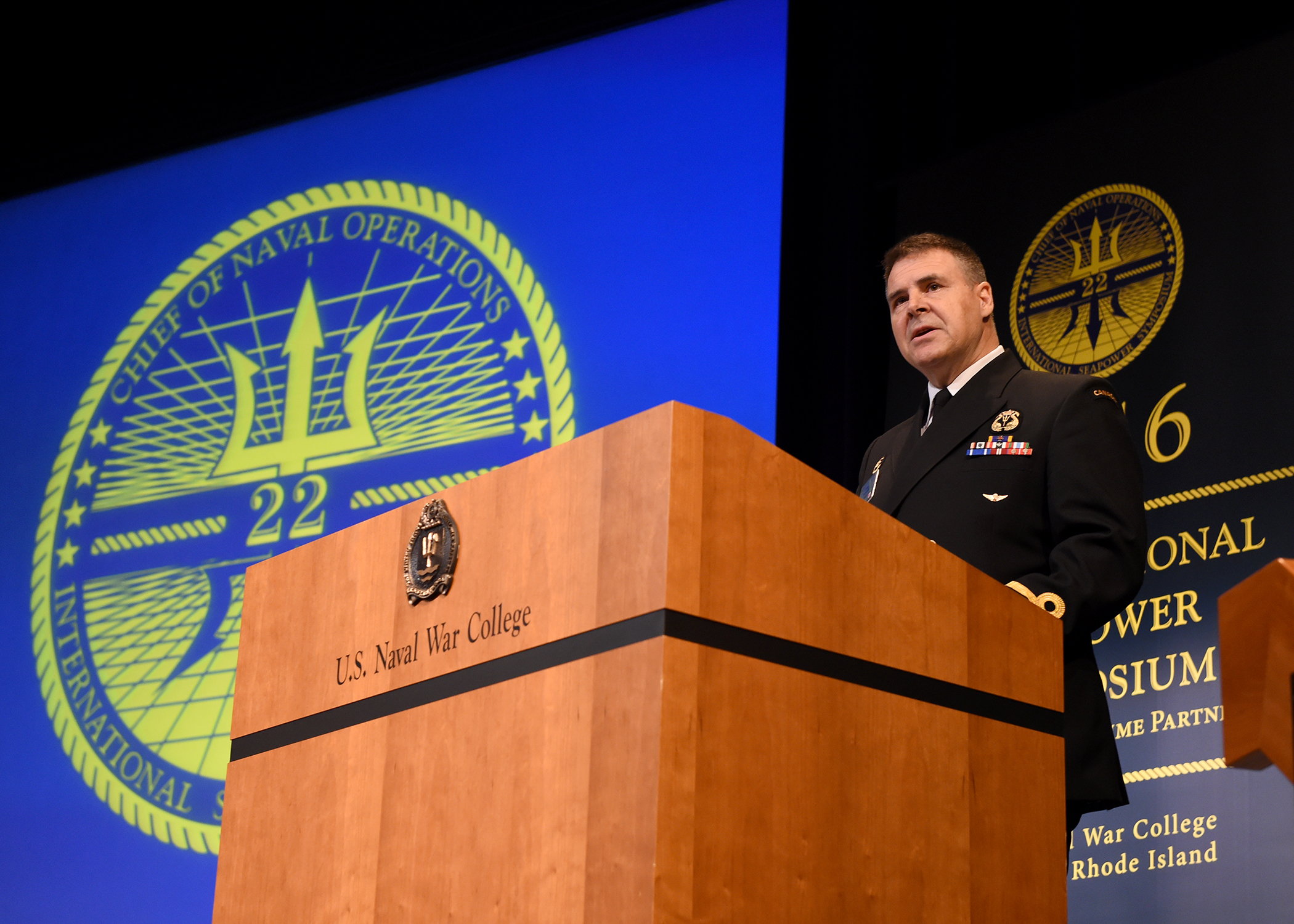
- Lloyd in 2016
- Military career
- Allegiance: Canada
- Branch: Royal Canadian Navy (Note: Known as Canadian Forces Maritime Command until 2011)
- Service years: 1980–2019
- Rank: Vice-Admiral
- Commands: HMCS Charlottetown; HMCS Algonquin; Canadian Fleet – Atlantic; Canadian Fleet – Pacific; Royal Canadian Navy
- Awards: Order of Military Merit; Canadian Forces' Decoration; Ordre National du Mérite

Vice-Admiral Maurice Frank Ronald "Ron" Lloyd CMM CD is a retired Royal Canadian Navy officer. He served as the 35th Commander of the Royal Canadian Navy from 23 June 2016 to 12 June 2019.

== Naval career ==
Educated at Royal Roads Military College, Lloyd joined the Royal Canadian Navy in 1985. He became commanding officer of the frigate HMCS Charlottetown in 2000 in which capacity he was deployed to the Persian Gulf. He became Executive Secretary to the Chief of Maritime Staff in 2002, commanding officer of the destroyer HMCS Algonquin in 2004 and Director General Maritime Force Development at National Defence Headquarters in Ottawa in 2006. He went on to be Commander Canadian Fleet – Atlantic in 2008, Commander Canadian Fleet – Pacific in March 2009 and Chief of Force Development in July 2010. In January 2016 it was announced that he would become Commander of the Royal Canadian Navy.

Lloyd was Acting Vice Chief of Defence Staff from January 13 to May 30, 2017, when Vice Admiral Mark Norman was relieved of his duties. He was subsequently replaced as Acting Vice Chief of Defence Staff by Lieutenant-General Alain Parent.

In February 2019, it was announced that he would retire and his replacement will be Vice-Admiral A.G. McDonald who will be promoted and become Commander of the Royal Canadian Navy.

== Awards and decorations ==
Lloyd's personal awards and decorations include the following:

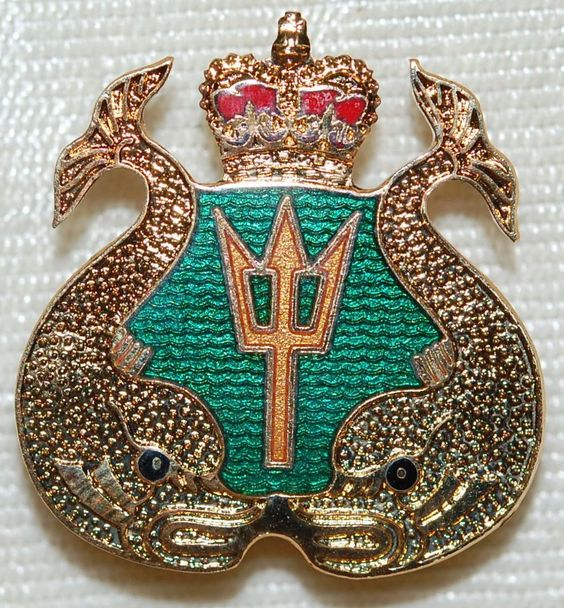

Ribbon	Description	Notes
	Order of Military Merit (CMM)	Appointed Commander (CMM) on 17 October 2012
	South-West Asia Service Medal	with AFGHANISTAN Clasp
	Special Service Medal	with NATO-OTAN Clasp; with PEACE-PAIX Clasp
	Canadian Peacekeeping Service Medal	
	NATO Medal for the former Yugoslavia	with FORMER YUGOSLAVIA clasp
	Queen Elizabeth II Diamond Jubilee Medal	Decoration awarded in 2012; Canadian version
	Canadian Forces' Decoration (CD)	with two Clasp for 32 years of services
	Ordre National du Mérite	Decoration awarded on 4 November 2017; Officer level; (France)
	Legion of Merit	Decoration awarded on 29 Feb 2020; Commander level; (United States)

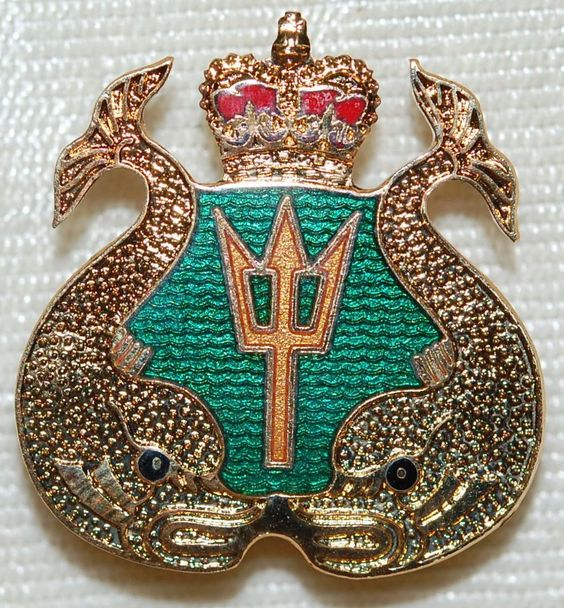
- He was a qualified Ship's Diver and as such wore the Canadian Forces Ship's Diver Badge
- He was a qualified Paratrooper and as such wore the Canadian Forces Jump Wings

== Notes ==
Military offices
Preceded by Mark Norman	Commander of the Royal Canadian Navy; 2016–2019	Succeeded by Art McDonald
