= Protecteur-class replenishment oiler =

Auxiliary Oiler Replenishment tanker, Royal Canadian Navy

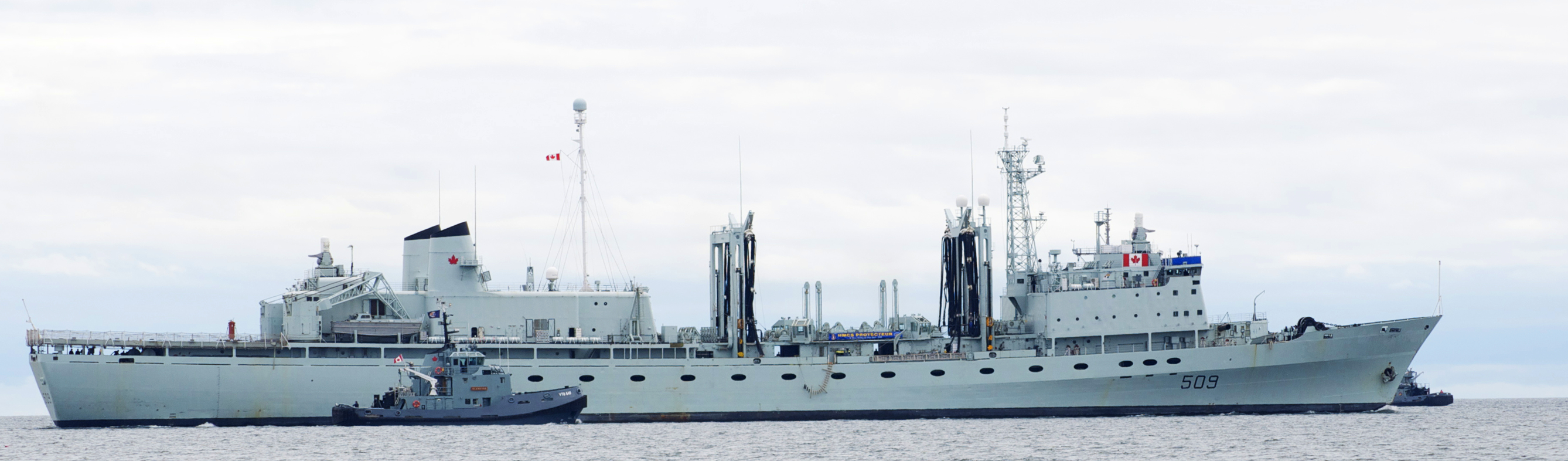
- HMCS Protecteur alongside a tugboat

Class overview
- Name: Protecteur class
- Builders: Saint John Shipbuilding
- Operators: Royal Canadian Navy
- Preceded by: Provider
- Succeeded by: Protecteur class and MV Asterix (interim)
- In commission: 30 August 1969 – 21 October 2016
- Planned: 2
- Completed: 2
- Scrapped: 2

General characteristics
- Type: Replenishment oiler
- Displacement: 8,380 t (8,248 long tons) standard; 24,700 t (24,310 long tons) full load
- Length: 171.9 m (564 ft 0 in)
- Beam: 23.2 m (76 ft 1 in)
- Draught: 10.1 m (33 ft 2 in)
- Propulsion: 2 × Babcock & Wilcox boilers; 1 × General Electric steam turbine engine at 21,000 shp (16,000 kW)
- Speed: 20 knots (37 km/h; 23 mph)
- Range: 4,100 nmi (7,600 km; 4,700 mi) at 20 knots (37 km/h; 23 mph)
- Boats & landing craft carried: 2 x Landing Craft Mechanized
- Complement: 365 officers and crew (men and women) including 45 in air detachment
- Electronic warfare & decoys: 4 × BAE Systems Mark 36 SRBOC chaff launchers; AN/SLQ-25 Nixie towed decoy
- Armament: 2 × 20 mm Phalanx CIWS; 6 × .50 calibre machine guns
- Aircraft carried: 3 × CH-124 Sea King helicopters

The Protecteur-class auxiliary oiler replenishment (AOR) ships were used by the Royal Canadian Navy to resupply ships at sea with food, munitions, fuel and spare parts. They had more sophisticated medical and dental facilities than smaller warships. At 172 metres (564 ft) the ships were some of the largest operated by the RCN. Entering service in 1969, the last vessel of the class was paid off in 2016.

== General characteristics ==
The Protecteur-class replenishment oilers were 171.9 m (564 ft 0 in) long, 23.2 m (76 ft 1 in) wide, and displaced up to a maximum of 24,700 tonnes (24,310 long tons) when fully loaded. Powered by two Babcock & Wilcox boilers, feeding a single General Electric steam turbine engine, the ships reached a maximum speed of 20 knots (37 km/h; 23 mph). At 20 knots, the range of the Protecteur class was limited to 4,100 nautical miles (7,600 km; 4,700 mi), but could be extended to 7,500 nmi (13,900 km; 8,600 mi) when only traveling at 11.5 knots (21.3 km/h; 13.2 mph). The Protecteur class could safely navigate in as little as 10.1 m (33 ft 2 in) of water.

Protecteur-class oilers carried a crew of three hundred and sixty five men and women, including 27 officers, and 45 air detachment personnel who operated and supported three embarked CH-124 Sea King helicopters. The crew was also responsible for loading and unloading the cargo of the Protecteur class, which included up to 14,590 t (14,360 long tons) of fuel, 400 t (394 long tons) of aviation fuel, 1,048 t (1,031 long tons) of dry cargo, and 1,250 t (1,230 long tons) of ammunition.

Two 20 mm Phalanx close-in weapon system points and six .50 calibre machine guns helped protect the cargo and crew of the Protecteur class if their BAE Systems Mark 36 SRBOC chaff launchers or AN/SLQ-25 Nixie towed decoy did not prevent enemy weaponry from endangering the ship.

== Ships in class ==
The Royal Canadian Navy listed the following two ships in the Protecteur class. Both ships were built by Saint John Shipbuilding.

Protecteur class construction data
Ship	Hull number	Laid down	Launched	Commissioned	Fate	Home port
Protecteur	AOR 509	16 December 1966	18 July 1968	30 August 1969	Paid off 14 May 2015	CFB Esquimalt, British Columbia
Preserver	AOR 510	17 October 1967	30 July 1970	7 August 1970	Paid off 21 October 2016	CFB Halifax, Nova Scotia

== Retirement and future ==
On 19 September 2014, Vice-Admiral Mark Norman of the Royal Canadian Navy announced the retirement of both Protecteur and Preserver, along with the Iroquois-class destroyers HMCS Iroquois and HMCS Algonquin. General wear and tear notwithstanding, Protecteur was involved in a very serious engine room fire in February 2014 and more recently corrosion problems were found on Preserver. On 27 November 2015, Protecteur and Algonquin were sold to R.J. MacIsaac Ltd. of Antigonish, Nova Scotia for scrapping. They were towed to Liverpool, Nova Scotia, where the vessels were to be broken up. Preserver was paid off on 21 October 2016.

Plans for replacing the class were first introduced in 2004. Lack of spare parts for the boilers and the fact that the Protecteur class are monohull tankers were the main driving points to replacing the class. The ships were intended to continue to operate until 2017, however, the Joint Support Ship Project will not be completed until two years later, leaving a gap in the ability for the RCN to refuel and resupply her own ships while deployed.

The Royal Canadian Navy looked at other options to fill the gap until the arrival of the two Protecteur-class auxiliary vessels in 2019 at the earliest. The navy is currently leasing replenishment vessels from other navies, and converted a civilian container ship to a replenishment vessel.
