= MV Asterix =

Canadian commercial container ship

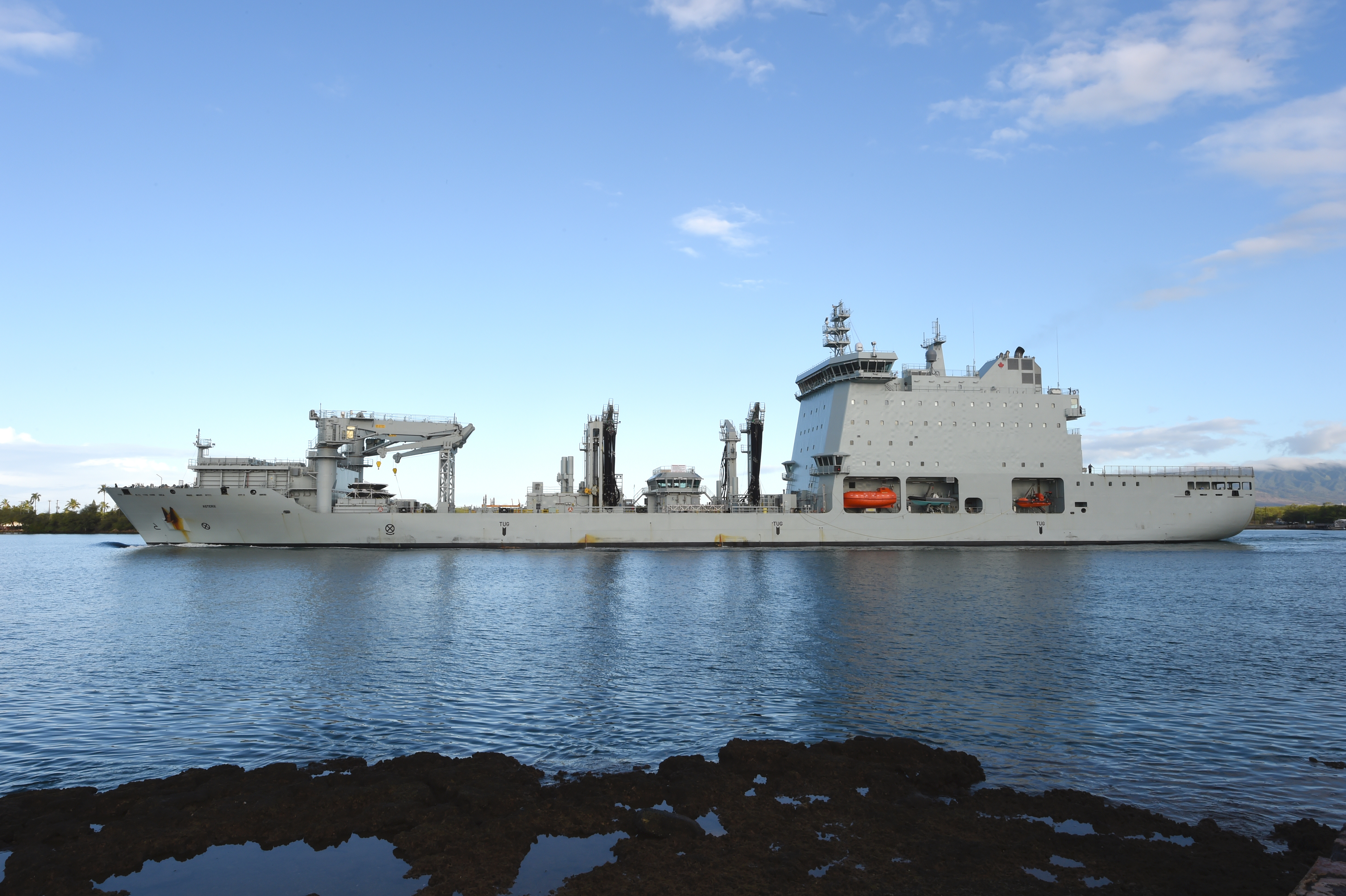
- MV Asterix in July 2018

History
- Name: Asterix
- Owner: Federal Fleet Services Inc. (as of October 2015); Capital Ship Management (before October 2015)
- Operator: Capital Ship Management (before October 2015)
- Port of registry: Liberia 2010–2015; Canada 2015
- Builder: Lloyd Werft Wismar
- Yard number: 147
- Laid down: 21 October 2008
- Launched: 27 January 2009
- Completed: 1 May 2010
- In service: 2010–2015
- Out of service: October 2015 – January 2018
- Renamed: Amorito October 2010 – November 2013; Neermoor June–October 2010; Cynthia early 2010 – June 2010
- Identification: IMO number: 9348182; MMSI number: 636014884; Callsign: A8XE9
- Status: Converted to military supply ship by Davie Shipbuilding/Federal Fleet Services and leased to the Government of Canada

Canada
- Name: Asterix
- Acquired: 2015
- Commissioned: 6 March 2018
- Identification: IMO number: 9348182; MMSI number: 316030879; Callsign: CFN7327
- Status: In service

General characteristics (as built)
- Type: Container ship
- Tonnage: 18,199 GT; 23,792 DWT
- Length: 182.52 m (598 ft 10 in) oa
- Beam: 25.2 m (82 ft 8 in)
- Draught: 9.5 m (31 ft 2 in)
- Installed power: MAN 7S60 MC-C Mk8, 16,660 kW (22,340 hp)
- Propulsion: 1 fixed propeller, 1 bow thruster
- Speed: 20.5 knots (38.0 km/h; 23.6 mph)
- Crew: 24

General characteristics (as converted)
- Type: Auxiliary replenishment vessel
- Displacement: 26,000 tonnes (full load)
- Length: 182.5 m (598 ft 9 in)
- Beam: 25.2 m (82 ft 8 in)
- Draught: 7 m (23 ft 0 in)
- Propulsion: 1 engine plus retractable bow thruster
- Speed: >20 knots (37 km/h; 23 mph)
- Range: >10,000 nmi (19,000 km)
- Boats & landing craft carried: 4 × RHIBs; 2 × Fast rescue craft; 2 × LCVP landing craft; 2 × Lifeboats
- Capacity: 400 tonnes (400 cubic metres (400,000 L))/day of fresh water; F76 marine diesel: 10,497 m^{3} (10,497,000 L); F44 aviation fuel: 1,332 m^{3} (1,332,000 L)
- Complement: 350 (HaDR)
- Crew: 150
- Armament: (provisions for, but not fitted with); 3 × Phalanx CIWS
- Aircraft carried: 2 × Sikorsky CH-148 Cyclones
- Aviation facilities: aft deck - 1 landing spot and 2 hangars capable of holding Chinook size helicopters.

MV Asterix (formerly MS Asterix, MS Amorito, MS Neermoor and MS Cynthia), also designated CSS Asterix, (Note: CSS stands for Combat Support Ship.) is a Canadian commercial container ship that was converted into a supply ship for the Royal Canadian Navy (RCN). It was purchased by Federal Fleet Services as part of Project Resolve and converted for use as an interim replacement between the out of service Protecteur-class replenishment oiler and the future Protecteur-class auxiliary vessel. Originally launched in Germany in 2010 as Cynthia, the ship was converted and delivered to the RCN in December 2017 and leased to the navy with a merchant navy crew, complemented by RCN personnel. Asterix will be in Canadian service well into the 2020s.

The ship was owned by Capital Ship Management of Greece and registered in Monrovia, Liberia. The vessel was delivered at Quebec in October 2015 for conversion by a pan-consortium comprising Chantier Davie Canada, Aecon Pictou Shipyard of Pictou, Nova Scotia and NavTech, the conversion designer. The vessel is limited in her deployment to enter dangerous areas due to her lack of weapons systems and military-grade radars, and inability to survive combat damage.

== Design ==
The vessel also has a container bay for protection of the containers while in transit. The ship has a double hull, a feature that the previous Protecteur class did not have and prevented them from operating outside of international waters.

A retractable thruster at the bow was added for additional maneuverability and redundancy. The extra thruster allows for dynamic positioning and improved station-keeping in Asterix.

For mission purposes the ship has rooms for crew and medical/hospital facilities for humanitarian missions, along with humanitarian and disaster relief capabilities. There is an area to treat and process evacuees and survivors; a large medical ward divided into two areas capable of treating up to 60. The ship also provides room for 350 in emergency situations.

Asterix, post-conversion, is able to operate up to eight smaller boats with quick launch and recovery capability. Asterix has two aircraft hangars planned for two embarked CH-148 Cyclone helicopters, but big enough to hold CH-147F Chinook helicopters, as well as a landing deck capable of handling the largest helicopters. The ship is crewed by 36 civilian personnel and up to 114 military personnel, with a 67-person detachment specifically aboard for replenishment duties.

Due to the civilian nature of her design, Asterix is limited in her ability to survive damage sustained in combat (because of less compartmentalization and redundancy of systems compared to military design ships), and is lacking military-grade radars. The ship also lacks any installed self-defense weapons systems, although there are provisions should the need arise. These two issues prevent the ship from being deployed to hazardous combat areas. However, Asterix's design incorporates the ability to be upgraded: if required to enter a higher-threat environment, the necessary self-defence weaponry and sensors could be rapidly installed to harden the vessel, and like similar auxiliary support vessels will rely on allied military escorts for defense.

In 2023, Federal Fleet Services acquired and installed a pioneering multi-domain command-and-control system to detect, monitor and intercept aerial and surface threats.

== Construction and commercial service ==
The ship was laid down on 21 October 2008 at the Nordic Yards Wismar in Wismar, Germany with the yard number 147. The ship was launched as Cynthia on 27 January 2009 and work was completed on the vessel on 1 May 2010. The ship was renamed Amorito in 2010. That same year the ship was renamed again to Neermoor, operating under an Antigua and Barbuda flag while owned by Briese Schiffahrts GmbH & Co KG. In 2013 the ship was renamed Asterix.

== Service with the Royal Canadian Navy ==
=== Acquisition ===
The ship was selected for the Royal Canadian Navy's Project Resolve, where in conjunction with Davie Shipbuilding of Quebec, a ship would be leased by the RCN and converted for use as a naval auxiliary supply vessel. The work converting the ship was initially to be done partially at the AECON shipyard in Pictou, Nova Scotia before being completed at Davie Shipbuilding in Quebec; instead, the ship was sent directly to Davie Shipbuilding. Pending an official agreement between the shipyard and the Canadian government, the vessel was to be ready by mid-2017. The ship was planned to be under contract with the Royal Canadian Navy until 2021 when the second of the two Protecteur-class support ships (renamed from the Queenston class) would be complete (though major delays subsequently pushed completion of the Protecteur-class vessels into the latter 2020s). The ship was reportedly acquired for $20 million.

In September 2015, it was announced that L-3 MAPPS (a subsidiary of L-3 Communications) was selected as partner in the conversion for its Integrated Platform Management System. Hepburn Engineering was chosen to provide new state of the art Replenishment at Sea equipment. OSI Maritime Systems was chosen by Davie Shipyards to install their integrated navigation and tactical system aboard the converted ship.

In November 2015, the new Liberal government delayed final approval of the $700 million seven-year deal for two months. On 30 November 2015, the government reversed that decision and gave final approval for the project, allowing Davie to go ahead with the conversion, while subsequently attempting to prosecute the commander of the Navy, Vice-Admiral Mark Norman, for allegedly leaking classified documents (charges which were later dropped). As of October 2016, the conversion was ahead of schedule, with 60% of the conversion completed.

On 20 July 2017 Davie Shipbuilding unveiled Asterix in a public ceremony with the traditional breaking of a bottle of champagne. This honour was performed by Pauline Théberge, spouse of J. Michel Doyon, the Lieutenant Governor of Quebec. The vessel was re-launched on 15 October 2017 at Quebec City. Sea trials were scheduled to begin on 16 November in Gaspé Bay. The vessel arrived at Halifax, Nova Scotia on 27 December 2017 to embark naval complement to begin training in January 2018. While shifting position within Halifax Harbour in preparation for a storm, the ship lost power. No damage was done to Asterix and the vessel made it safely to the new position. The vessel completed sea trials and was formally accepted into service with the Royal Canadian Navy in January 2018.

=== Service ===
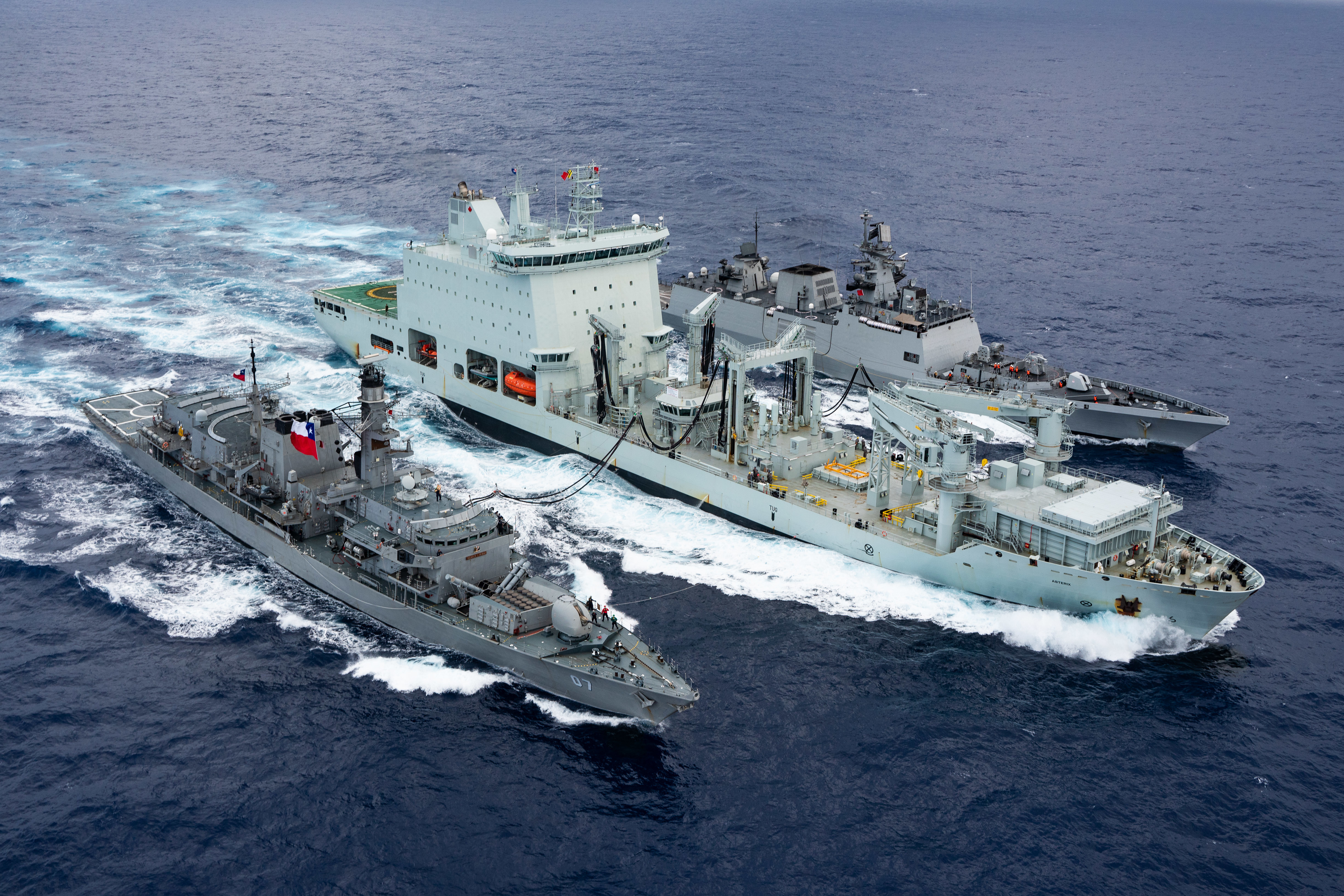
The Chilean Navy frigate Almirante Lynch and the Indian Navy frigate Sahyadri perform a replenishment-at-sea with Asterix off the coast of Hawaii during a RIMPAC exercise, July 2018

In June and July 2018, Asterix, along with the Halifax-class frigates Vancouver and Ottawa, took part in RIMPAC 2018 around the Hawaiian Islands. The ship then joined HMCS Calgary in the Western Pacific, visiting Da Nang, Vietnam. Calgary and Asterix navigated in the South China Sea and were shadowed by a Chinese naval vessel. Asterix supported Calgary during the frigate's assignment enforcing United Nations resolutions against North Korea. After a year at sea, Asterix and Calgary returned to Canada at CFB Esquimalt on 18 December.

On 6 February 2019, Regina and Asterix departed Esquimalt for Pacific operations with other nations' navies. On 18 February, a Cyclone helicopter from Regina was attempting to land on Asterix and was damaged in the operation. Asterix and the damaged Cyclone were redirected to Guam to undergo inspection. No damage was reported to Asterix, and following air tests of the repaired Cyclone, both ships resumed their deployment. In March 2019, Regina and Asterix parted ways, with Regina deployed to the Middle East as part of Operation Artemis. The vessel returned to Halifax on 26 August after 500 days at sea performing 197 refueling operations with 40 warships.

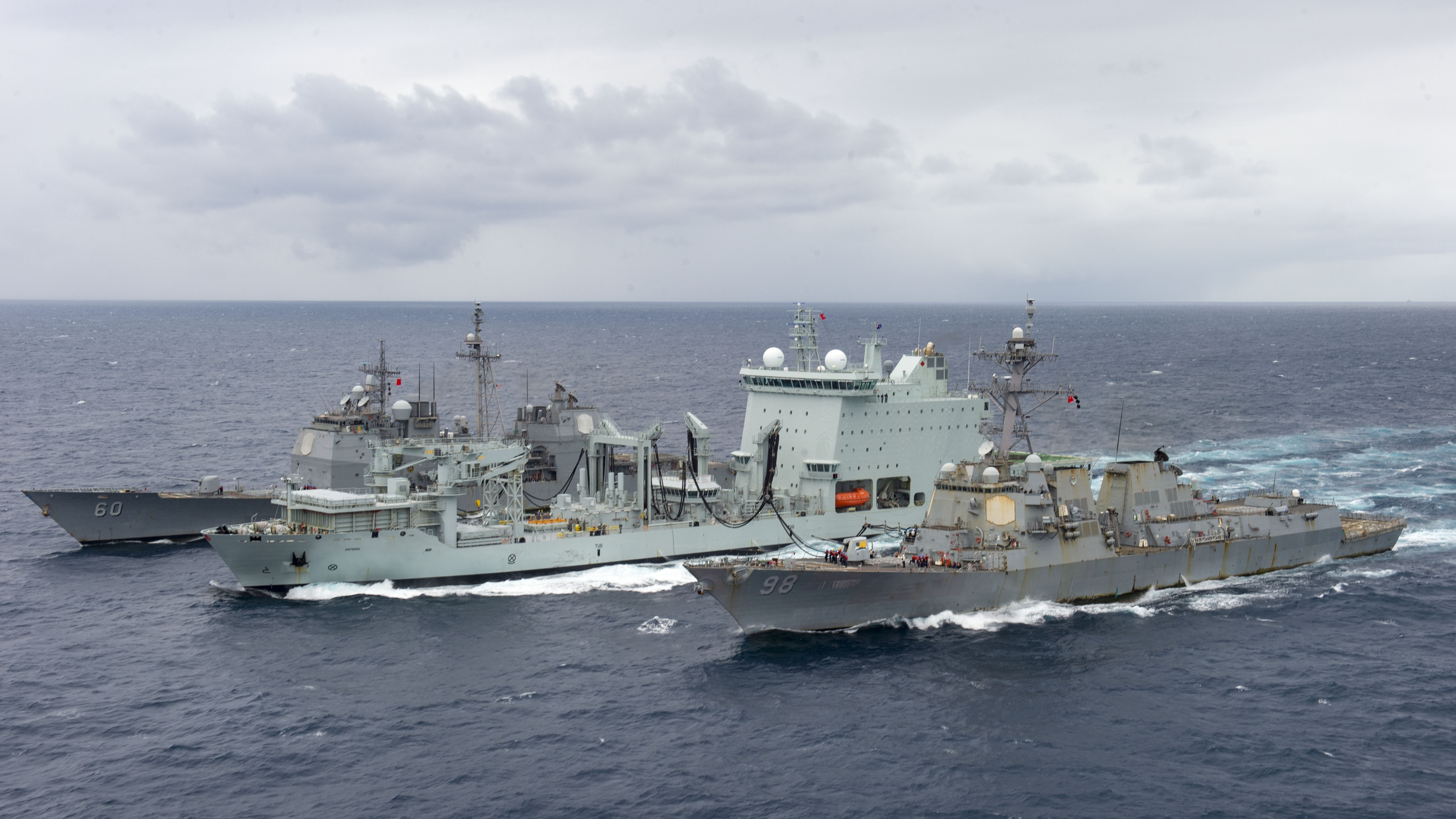
Asterix refuels United States Navy destroyers in the Atlantic Ocean, May 2020

In August 2020, Asterix was deployed to the Arctic as part of Operation Nanook along with Glace Bay and Ville de Québec from the Royal Canadian Navy and warships from the Danish, French, U.S. navies. In August 2022, it was announced that the Royal Canadian Navy's charter of the ship would be extended for at least a further two years with further options to renew the charter, or to purchase the ship, thereafter. In November 2022, the ship arrived at the Davie Shipyard for a one month maintenance period after which she would return to service.

On 26 March 2023, Asterix and the frigate Montréal left Halifax on a deployment to the South China Sea and the Indo-Pacific region. The ships, joined by Ottawa, returned to Vancouver in December. In mid 2024, Asterix took part in the multi-national exercise RIMPAC 2024 along with the offshore patrol vessel Max Bernays and the frigate Vancouver.

In March 2026, the ship participated in the Royal Australian Navy's Exercise Kakadu Fleet Review in Sydney Harbour.

== See also ==
- HMAS Sirius – converted tanker that served with the Royal Australian Navy from 2006 to 2021.
- National Shipbuilding Strategy
