= HMCS Algonquin (DDG 283) =

Royal Canadian Navy warship

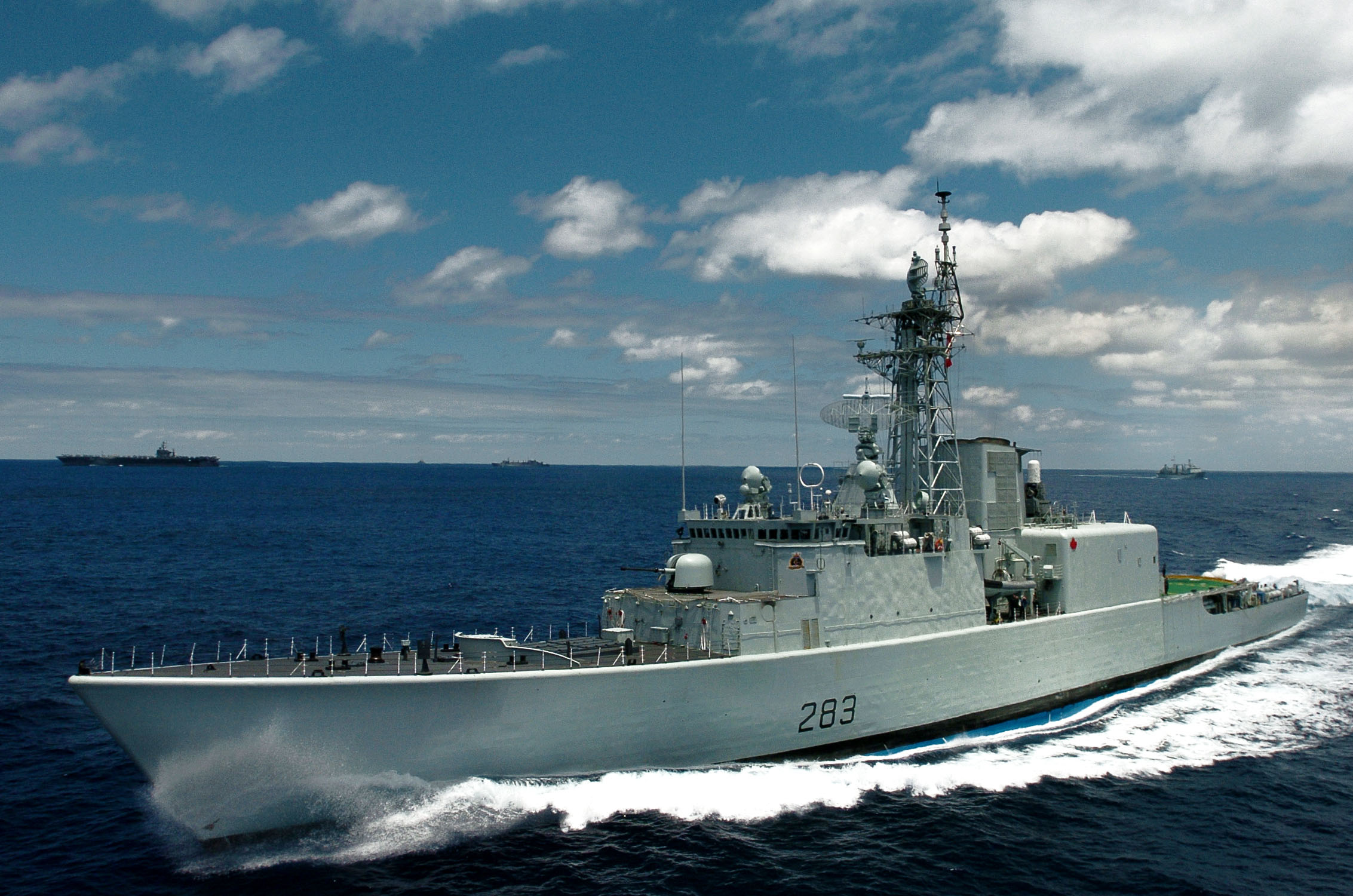
- HMCS Algonquin in 2004

History

Canada
- Name: Algonquin
- Namesake: Algonquin
- Builder: Davie Shipbuilding, Lauzon
- Laid down: 1 September 1969
- Launched: 23 April 1971
- Commissioned: 3 November 1973
- Decommissioned: 11 June 2015
- In service: 1973–2015
- Out of service: 2015
- Refit: 11 October 1991
- Stricken: 2015
- Home port: CFB Esquimalt
- Identification: MMSI number: 316089000; Callsign: CZJX
- Motto: À Coup Sûr (With sure stroke)
- Honours and awards: Norway, 1944; Normandy, 1944; Arctic, 1944–45, Arabian Sea
- Fate: Sold for scrapping 27 November 2015; scrapped in Liverpool, Nova Scotia in 2016
- Notes: Colours: Gold and azure blue
- Badge: Sable, a base barry wavy argent and azure of four, from which issues an Algonquin hunter's arm embowed proper wearing arm and wrist bands argent and holding a fish spear in bend argent transfixing an eel or.

General characteristics
- Class & type: Iroquois-class destroyer
- Displacement: 5,100 tonnes (5,000 long tons)
- Length: 129.8 m (425.9 ft)
- Beam: 15.2 m (49.9 ft)
- Draught: 4.7 m (15.4 ft)
- Propulsion: COGOG – 2 shaft; 2 × Allison 570-KF cruise gas turbines 5.6 MW (7,500 hp); 2 × Pratt & Whitney FT4A-2 boost gas turbines (37 MW (50,000 hp))
- Speed: 29 kn (54 km/h; 33 mph)
- Range: 4,500 nmi (8,300 km; 5,200 mi)
- Complement: 280
- Sensors & processing systems: Signaal AN/SPQ 501 DA-08 radar; Signaal LW-08 AN/SPQ 502 radar; SQS-510 hull sonar; SQS-510 VDS sonar
- Armament: 32 × VLS, Standard SM-2MR Block IIIA SAMs; 1 × 76 mm/62 OTO Melara; 6 × 324 mm (12.75 in) tubes firing Mark-46 Mod 5 torpedoes; 1 × Phalanx CIWS (Block 1); 2 × M2 Browning machine guns
- Aircraft carried: 2 × CH-124 Sea King helicopters
- Aviation facilities: Hangar and flight deck

HMCS Algonquin (DDG 283) was an Iroquois-class destroyer that served in the Royal Canadian Navy (RCN) from 1973 to 2015.

Algonquin was the fourth ship of her class which is sometimes referred to as the Tribal class or the 280 class. She is the second vessel to use the designation HMCS Algonquin. Algonquin carried the hull classification symbol DDG.

Algonquin was originally designed to be primarily an anti-submarine destroyer. The Iroquois-class destroyers were the first ships in the Royal Canadian Navy (other than the Protecteur class) to carry multiple helicopters, and were the first ships to be powered entirely by gas turbines in a COGOG (Combined Gas Or Gas) arrangement. Algonquin underwent a major refit called the Tribal Class Update and Modernization Program (TRUMP) from 1987 to 1991 and emerged as an area air defence destroyer.

She was assigned to Maritime Forces Pacific (MARPAC) and was homeported at CFB Esquimalt.

== Design ==
On 26 October 1987, Algonquin entered the Tribal Class Update and Modernization Project refit, dubbed TRUMP, at MIL-Davie, Lauzon. Labour problems and contract disputes delayed completion of the work until 11 Oct 1991.

As a modernization concept, origins of the idea date back to the early 1980s. By the mid-1980s the Canadian Federal Government had decided on the necessity of upgrading the Iroquois-class ships and released a request for proposal, foreseeing complete refurbishment. The project resulted in a thorough refurbishment of the ship and modernization of mechanical, electronic and weapon systems.

Litton Systems Canada was selected as prime contractor and project manager after submitting a detailed 4000+ page proposal which emphasized, maximum automation and software engineering This aspect of the ship was extremely important due to the desired high level of automation in real-time command and control functions on the refurbished ships. Software engineering military standards were fairly recent and not yet widely assimilated, so Litton had to exercise particular caution in the areas of software configuration management (SCM) and software quality assurance (SQA). Litton's Proposal to the Canadian Federal Government had a 250-page SCM and SQA policies section which was accepted without a single edit due to highly sensitive and farsighted work of the Advance Programs Division Technical Contract Team at Litton who established a massive and capable engineering force by 1988–89.

The entire class underwent major retrofits in the early 1990s as a part of the Tribal Class Update and Modernization Project. These refits had the effect of re-purposing the ships for area air defence; following, Iroquois-class ships were also referred to as air defence destroyers. This resulted in an update of vessel designation from DDH (Destroyer Helicopter) to DDG (Destroyer Guided Missile). Their former anti-submarine role was largely assumed by the Halifax-class frigates.

The main weapon of the new design was the Mk.41 VLS, firing 29 SM-2 Block III long-range anti-aircraft missiles. To provide room for the VLS, the original 5-in L54 gun was replaced with the smaller, but much faster firing, Oto Melara 76 mm gun, relocated from the deck to the bridgework above it. A Phalanx CIWS (Close-in Weapon System) was also added for self-defence. The torpedo tubes were retained, but the Limbo and Sea Sparrow systems were removed.

The modernization also replaced the original Pratt & Whitney FT12 cruise turbines with newer 12,788 shaft horsepower (9,536 kW) 570-KF engines from Allison. The speed remained the same, as weight had increased to 5,100 tons full load. The original split funnel was replaced by a simpler single funnel, giving the ship a reduced heat signature due to cooler engine exhaust.

== Construction and career ==
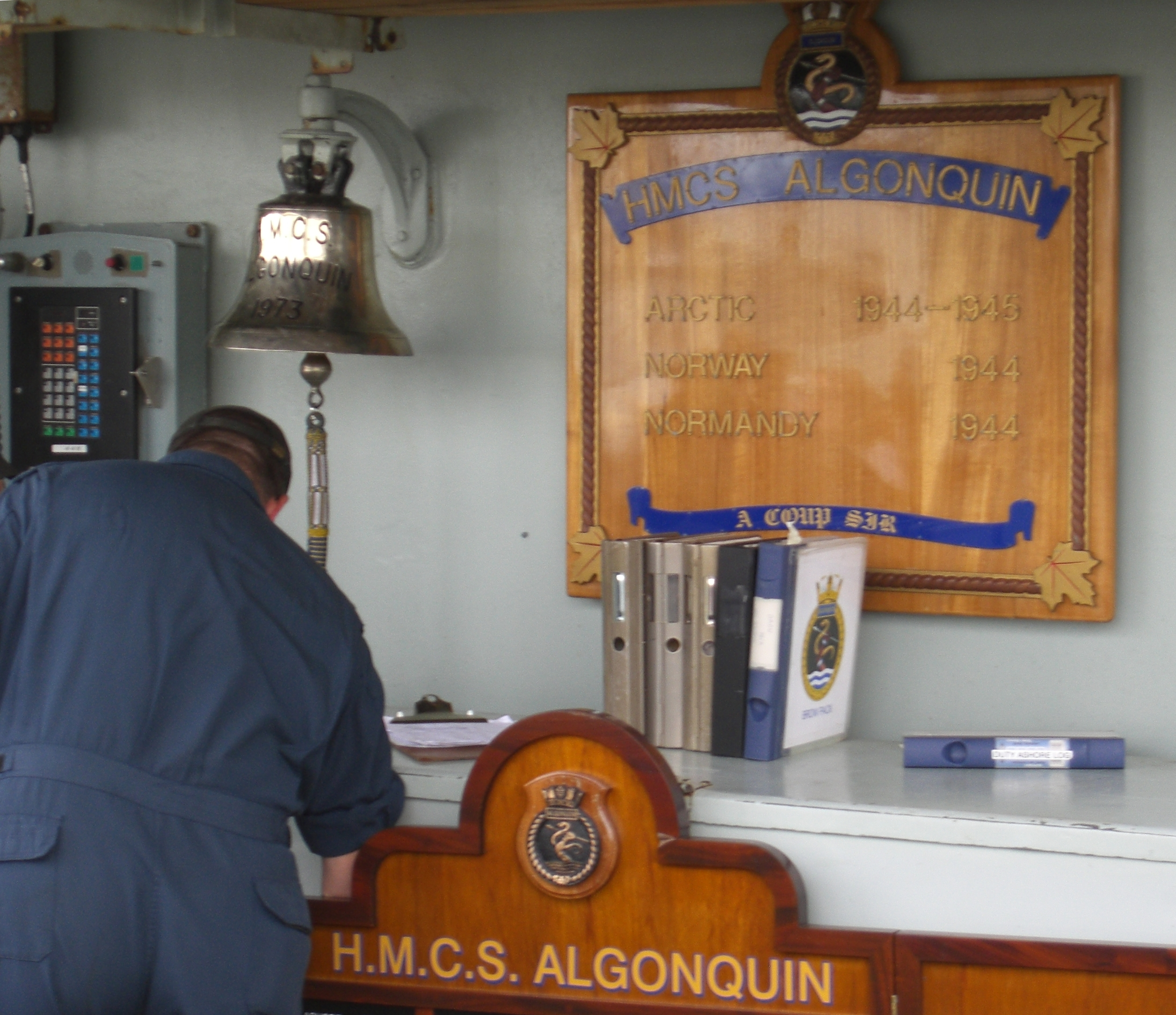
Algonquin's ship's bell

Algonquin, named for the Algonquin people, was laid down on 1 September 1969 by Davie Shipbuilding at Lauzon, Quebec. The ship was launched on 23 April 1971, christened on 27 April and commissioned into the Canadian Forces on 3 November 1973.

On 9 November, while undertaking a six-day passage, Algonquin conducted first crew readiness work-ups (WUPS) at sea. During this time, the ship embarked her first CH-124 Sea King helicopter. The destroyer was initially stationed out of Halifax, Nova Scotia. On 28 November, Algonquin departed Halifax to participate in the naval exercise MARCOT 3/73 with the destroyer escorts Yukon and Assiniboine.

In 1974, the destroyer rescued the crew of the fishing vessel Paul & Maria, which sank 130 kilometres (80 mi) east of Halifax. On 10 January 1975, Algonquin sailed for Portland, England to take up duties as flagship for the NATO Standing Naval Force Atlantic (STANAVFORLANT) in consort with the US frigate Edward McDonnell. On 21 May, Algonquin sailed in company with the replenishment oiler Protecteur, sister ship Iroquois and the destroyer escorts Skeena and Margaree for Bermuda for exercise MARCOT 75.

In August 1976, Algonquin participated in the search and rescue (SAR) of the fishing vessel Peggy's Cove which had been in a collision with the freighter Arosia. On 8 November, Algonquin was ordered to sea to assist the fisheries protection vessel Chebucto which was attempting to arrest two Cuban fishing vessels believed to be violating Canadian Coastal Fisheries Laws in the approaches to Halifax harbour. On 12 January 1977, Algonquin deployed for CARIBEX 1–77 Assiniboine, Protecteur and Margaree, part of the United States Navy (USN) exercise Springboard 77 in the Puerto Rican operating area. Algonquin was assigned flagship of First Canadian Destroyer Squadron.

On 27 May 1978 Algonquin was awarded the L.W. Murray Trophy for gunnery excellence and the 20 Knot Mortar Firing Trophy, both of which were retained by Algonquin for the second year running. She served as the Canadian trials ship for the jointly United States and Canadian developed AN/SAR-8 Infrared Search and Target Designation System, having the Advanced Development Model installed in June for sea trials. On 28 August, the ship departed Halifax for the NATO exercise Northern Wedding. On 26 September Algonquin assumed the role of flagship to the Canadian Commander of STANAVFORLANT from sister ship Huron, and was one of a seven ship squadron. From 15 to 18 November, the ship was part of STANAVFORLANT and conducted anti-submarine warfare (ASW) operations in the Baltic Sea. She continued as part of the STANAVFORLANT force into 1979, tracking and shadowing Warsaw Pact submarines in the North Atlantic.

=== 1980s ===
A scheduled refit postponed to 1981 resulted in Algonquin's exclusion in any national or NATO exercises. Algonquin presented the ASW Proficiency Shield and the 20 Knot Trophy. On 26 January, a fire, rated as "A" class, occurred in the forward decontamination compartment. The fire was believed to have been caused by toilet paper, stored temporarily in the space, coming into contact with a steam radiator. In November, the ship participated in ASW exercises, torpedo firings and pro-submarine exercises with the submarine Okanagan. The postponed refit occurred from January–July 1981, noted to have been completed on time, as scheduled. Additions included Surface and Air Weapon Information System (SAWIS) performance monitoring equipment for the Gun/Missile Fire Control System and 84 tons of ballast in the aft section of the ship. The ship worked-up in August and September, and in November participated in the naval exercise MARCOT 2/81.

Algonquin participated in two major deployments in 1982, beginning with CARIBOPS 82 for two months and then STANAVFORLANT for five months as flagship of the fleet. Algonquin took part in a search for an American A7 Aircraft believed to have crashed just north of Puerto Rico; no detail on the aircraft or search was provided. In February, during CARIBOPS 82, Algonquin was dispatched 24 kilometres (15 mi) west of Martinique where the diving support vessel Cormorant was drifting, having lost all propulsion. Proceeding with all dispatch, Algonquin met Cormorant the same day and the decision was taken to tow her to Bridgetown, Barbados. In March, Algonquin participated in NATO exercise SAFEPASS 82 which was designed to test convoy procedures. In August, Algonquin joined STANAVFORLANT in the North Sea. On 5 August, Algonquin assumed the duties of flagship of the Standing Naval Force Atlantic. In September, Algonquin operated in the vicinity the Shetland Islands for Exercise Northern Wedding 82 during which she provided close ASW escort to a USN amphibious task force which was tasked to land on the coast of Jutland in Denmark. In October, the ship conducted operations with the Danish Navy in the Western Baltic. In November, Algonquin participated in the Royal Navy exercise JMC 824, and trained ships in procedures to counter multiple threats. In December, the destroyer took part in a brief transit exercise with units of the French Navy, with Algonquin leading the Force across the English Channel.

In February 1983, the ship took part in CARIBOPS 83. In June, Algonquin participated in MARCOT 1/83 near Bermuda, focusing on passive detection capabilities of ASW. In October, Algonquin participated in MARCOT 2/83, an ASW exercise focusing on shallow water detection, mainly staged in the Gulf of St. Lawrence. In February 1984, Algonquin guarded the aircraft carrier USS Independence for 36 straight sea days. In April, Algonquin transited to Montreal to go into dry dock until August. In October, Algonquin sailed to Bermuda. 1984 would be the last year Algonquin would embark a Helicopter Air Detachment as part of the ship's company for 10 years.

In early 1985, the ship took part in air defence exercises, trials and fisheries patrols. Algonquin was one 33 ships anchored in Bedford Basin to celebrate the Canadian naval service's 75th anniversary. In June, the destroyer sailed the Saint Lawrence River to continue anniversary celebrations. That August, Algonquin participated in the NATO exercise OCEAN SAFARI. On 1 March 1986 Algonquin was deployed to assist the fisheries protection vessel Cape Rogers in escorting Panamanian fishing trawler Peonia 7 into St. John's after the fishing trawler had ignored orders to put into St. John's and had attempted to flee to international waters with two officers from the Canadian Department of Fisheries and Oceans aboard.

In February 1987, the ship deployed for CARIBOPS 87. Algonquin joined STANAVFORLANT from March–May as flagship. In May, she participated in the annual exercise "Open Gate" held in the Strait of Gibraltar. In June, she participated in the NATO exercise "Vendetta", in the North Sea. That October, the ship sailed to Lauzon, Quebec to commence her TRUMP refit at MIL-Davie Shipyards, beginning on 26 October.

=== 1990s ===
Algonquin's refit was completed on 11 October 1991. The ship was reclassified from Destroyer Helicopter (DDH) to Destroyer Guided Missile (DDG). Stability tests nearly led to Algonquin capsizing where the ship was stuck at a 25 degree incline for several hours.

On 29 March 1993, Algonquin sailed to join STANAVFORLANT, arriving in April. She was once again made flagship and took part in the naval blockade of the former Yugoslavia as part of Operation "Sharp Guard". On 2 July, Algonquin conducted the first of a total of 88 merchant vessel boardings as part of the blockade. On 27 July, the busiest day for Algonquin boarding parties, seven merchant ships were boarded in a 23‑hour period. On 1 October, the ship completed her last boarding in support of the operation. On 5 October, Algonquin completed turnover of STANAVFORLANT to HMCS Iroquois and returned home.

In 1994, the destroyer was reassigned to the west coast. On 2 July, Algonquin departed from Halifax en route to Esquimalt, British Columbia. Upon transiting the Panama Canal, the ship officially joined Maritime Forces Pacific. The ship arrived at Esquimalt on 5 August. In 1995, Algonquin took part in several naval exercises including COMPUTEX and MARCOT. She also conducted integrated training operations with the USS Carl Vinson Battle Group (CVBG).

In February 1996, Algonquin sailed to participate in FLEETEX 96-1A alongside Protecteur and the frigates Regina and Winnipeg as part of the USS Carl Vinson Battle Group. On 18 February, the ship departed for Yokosuka, Japan via the Aleutian Islands on WESTPLOY 96 in consort with the replenishment ship Preserver and the frigates Regina, Winnipeg and Vancouver. On 3 April, the task group (TG) rendezvoused with Japanese Maritime Self-Defence Force ships Ayase and Ishikari south of the Kuril Islands to participate in Operation Maple-Cherry, a naval exercise of simulated ASW. On 3 May, the task group rendezvoused south of Inchon, South Korea with the Republic of Korea ships Kyong Buk and Che Ju and HMCS Regina. The Canadian–Korean TG proceeded for Pearl Harbor, Hawaii and from 22 May to 16 June participated in RIMPAC 96. The Canadian task group returned to Esquimalt on 27 June. She performed further naval exercises later in the year. During one of these exercises, Algonquin was tasked with an intelligence-gathering mission on a Russian merchant vessel in Canadian waters, escorting her to the entrance of Juan de Fuca Strait. In December, Algonquin prepared for a refit with scheduled completion of April 1998.

Algonquin began her refit costing $25 million in mid-January 1998. The ship returned to service in May 1998. On 24 August 1999, the ship was doing trials with a private MiG-21 aircraft when the aircraft crashed into the ocean. A fuel slick and debris was found in the search area but nothing more and after 24 hours the search was terminated. Later that week Algonquin, in consort with the Canadian Coast Guard, was tasked to intercept, track and board an illegal Chinese migrant vessel. The vessel was escorted to Gold River, British Columbia where 159 migrants were received by the Royal Canadian Mounted Police for medical and legal processing.

=== 2000s ===
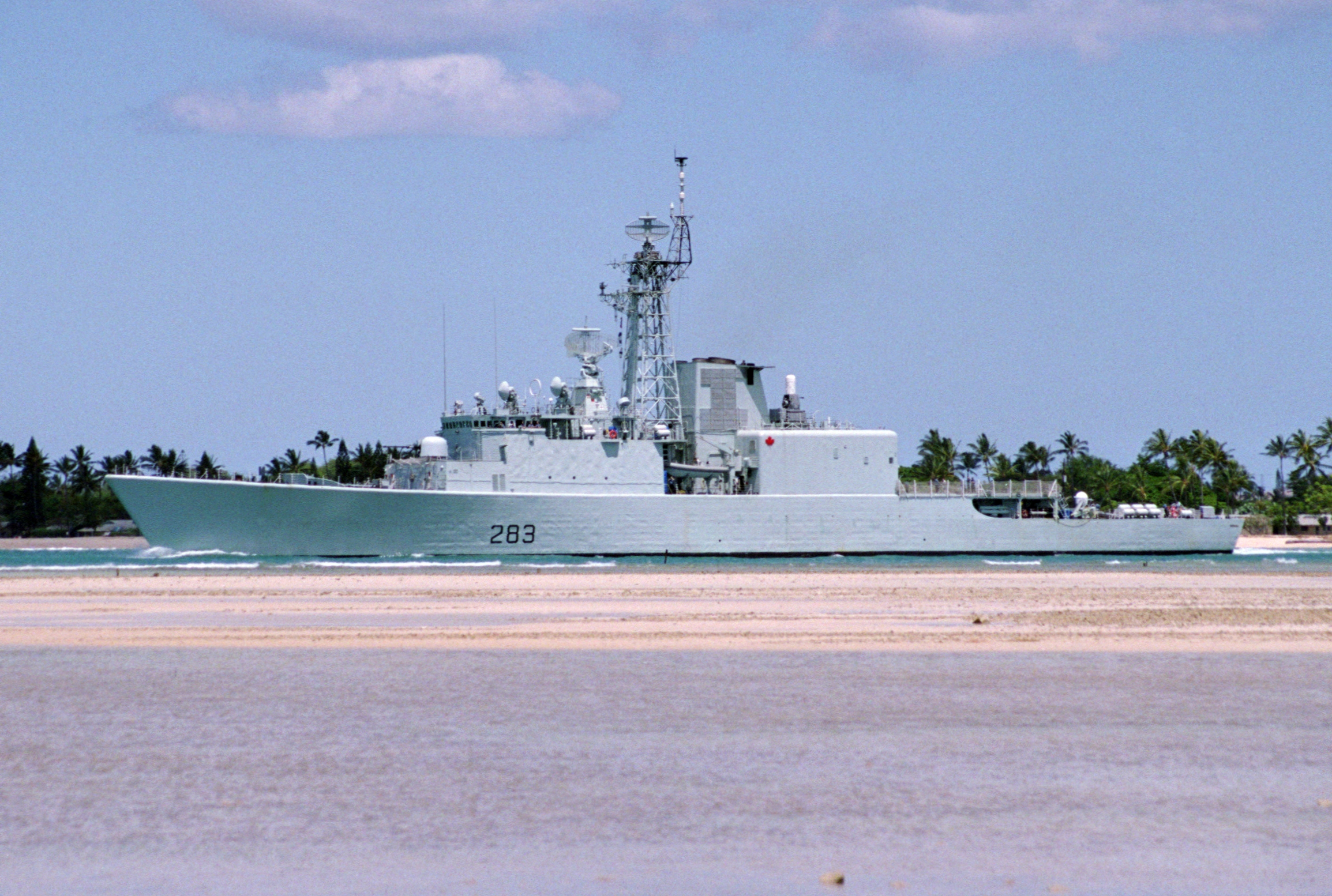
Algonquin at Pearl Harbor in June 2000

The ship deployed for WESTPLOY 00 in April 2000. On departing Qingdao, Algonquin and Winnipeg conducted the first military exercise by a Western nation with China. In June, the ship participated in RIMPAC 00 with 54 ships and over 20,000 sailors from Australia, Canada, Chile, Japan, Korea and the United States. In 2001, Algonquin continued the duties of flagship for the Commander Canadian Fleet Pacific. As such, Algonquin took part in naval exercises and work-ups in a busy preparation period for Operation Apollo and conducted joint exercises with the Australian, New Zealand and United States navies.

Algonquin continued the duties of flagship for the Commander Canadian Fleet Pacific. As such, Algonquin took part in Operation Apollo and completed a highly successful mission in the Gulf of Oman. She made port visits in Hawaii, Saipan, Guam, Malaysia, Thailand, Hong Kong and United Arab Emirates. On 4 March, the destroyer deployed for the Gulf of Oman, in support of Operation Apollo, conducting her mission on 1 May through 4 September. On 14 October, the ship returned to Esquimalt, having been away for almost seven months in the Persian Gulf and logging 55,000 nautical miles (102,000 km; 63,000 mi). During the operation Algonquin hailed over 1,700 vessels and boarded 55. She carried out 96 inspections of 'go-fast vessels', and discovered and apprehended several suspected terrorists. Algonquin conducted a short port visit to Peddar Bay on 21 November, and returned to Esquimlat Harbour for a short refit period.

From March to August 2003 Algonquin was under refit by Victoria Shipyards. She rejoined the Pacific Fleet as the flagship upon her return to service. In 2005, the ship participated in several naval exercises and visited San Francisco with Protecteur, Vancouver and Calgary in October. In 2008, Algonquin was turned over to Victoria Shipyards for refit, reentering service in 2009.

On 30 August 2013, Algonquin was involved in a collision at sea with Protecteur while conducting towing manoeuvres en route to Hawaii. There were no injuries. The ship was able to return to her home port of Esquimalt, to undergo a full damage assessment. It was assessed that Algonquin suffered extensive damage to her port side hangar and remained alongside in Esquimalt. As a result of the collision, a planned deployment to the Asia-Pacific region was cancelled.

=== Paid off ===
Considering the relatively short service life remaining for Algonquin, which was scheduled to be retired in early 2019, and the cost of repairs, it was deemed that the expense of re-instating the ship to full operating capability would not be a responsible use of public funds. On 19 September 2014 it was announced that Algonquin would be paid off. Algonquin was paid off on 11 June 2015. Algonquin, along with Protecteur, was sold for scrapping in November 2015 to R.J. MacIsaac Limited, Liverpool, Nova Scotia. The ship was towed to the scrapyard in 2016.

== Lineage ==
The first ship in the RCN to bear the name Algonquin was a V-class destroyer, laid down in the United Kingdom as HMS Valentine but later commissioned in 1944 by the Naval Service of Canada as HMCS Algonquin. During the Second World War she saw much action while attached to the British Home Fleet, including taking part in an attack on the Tirpitz. Algonquin was also present on D-day during the invasion of Normandy and escorted convoys to Murmansk, Russia. She was paid off in 1946 at the end of the war, but was re-commissioned in 1953 after extensive modification to anti-submarine destroyer-escort standard. She was paid off for the final time in 1970.
