= HMCS Robert Hampton Gray =

Royal Canadian Navy offshore patrol vessel

History

Canada
- Name: Robert Hampton Gray
- Namesake: Robert Hampton Gray
- Builder: Irving Shipbuilding, Halifax, Nova Scotia
- Laid down: 21 August 2023
- Launched: 9 December 2024
- Completed: 21 August 2025
- Commissioned: 16 November 2026
- Identification: Hull number: AOPV 435; IMO number: 4702553
- Status: Ship in service

General characteristics
- Type: Harry DeWolf-class offshore patrol vessel
- Displacement: 6,615 t (6,511 long tons)
- Length: 103.6 m (339 ft 11 in)
- Beam: 19.0 m (62 ft 4 in)
- Draught: 5.7 m (18 ft 8 in)
- Ice class: Polar Class 5
- Installed power: 4 × MAN 6L32/44CR (4 × 3.6 MW)
- Propulsion: Diesel-electric; Two shafts (2 × 4.5 MW); Bow thruster
- Speed: 17 kn (31 km/h; 20 mph) (open water); 3 kn (5.6 km/h; 3.5 mph) in 1 m (3 ft 3 in) ice
- Range: 6,800 nmi (12,600 km; 7,800 mi) at 14 kn (26 km/h; 16 mph)
- Boats & landing craft carried: 2 × 8.5 m (28 ft) multi-role rescue boats; 12 m (39 ft) landing craft
- Complement: 65
- Armament: 1 × BAE Mk 38 25 mm (0.98 in) gun; 2 × M2 Browning machine gun
- Aircraft carried: Sikorsky CH-148 Cyclone or other helicopters/CU-176 Gargoyle UAV
- Aviation facilities: Hangar and flight deck

HMCS Robert Hampton Gray (AOPV 435) is the sixth and final Harry DeWolf-class offshore patrol vessel for the Royal Canadian Navy. The class was derived from the Arctic Offshore Patrol Ship project as part of the National Shipbuilding Strategy and is primarily designed for the patrol and support of Canada's Arctic regions.

== Design and construction ==
The option to build the sixth ship in the series was taken up in November 2018 when the vessel was ordered. The first steel for the vessel was cut in August 2022, starting ship construction. The keel was laid down on 21 August 2023 and the ship was launched in December 2024. Contractor sea trials were completed on 6 August 2025, and she was formally named in a traditional bottle breaking ceremony by the niece of the ship's namesake, Lieutenant Robert Hampton Gray, on 9 August 2025, coinciding with the 80th anniversary of his death.

The Harry DeWolf-class offshore patrol vessels are designed for use in the Arctic regions of Canada for patrol and support within Canada's exclusive economic zone. The vessel is 103.6 metres (339 ft 11 in) long overall with a beam of 19.0 m (62 ft 4 in). The ship has a displacement of 6,615 metric tons (6,511 long tons). The ship has an enclosed foredeck that protects machinery and work spaces from Arctic climates. The vessel is powered by a diesel-electric system composed of four 3.6-megawatt (4,800 hp) MAN 6L32/44CR four-stroke medium-speed diesel generators and two electric propulsion motors rated at 4.5 MW (6,000 hp) driving two shafts. Robert Hampton Gray is capable of 17 knots (31 km/h; 20 mph) in open water and 3 knots (5.6 km/h; 3.5 mph) in one-metre (3 ft 3 in) first-year sea ice. The ship is also equipped with a bow thruster to aid during manoeuvres and docking procedures without requiring tugboat assistance. The ship has an operational range of at least 6,800 nautical miles (12,600 km; 7,800 mi) at 14 knots (26 km/h; 16 mph) in open water and an endurance of 120 days. Robert Hampton Gray is equipped with fin stabilizers to decrease roll in open water but can be retracted during icebreaking.

Robert Hampton Gray is able to deploy with multiple payloads, including shipping containers, underwater survey equipment or landing craft. Payload operations are aided by a 20-metric-ton (20-long-ton; 22-short-ton) crane for loading and unloading. The ship is equipped with a vehicle bay which can hold pickup trucks, all-terrain vehicles and snowmobiles. The ship also has two 8.5 m (27 ft 11 in) multi-role rescue boats capable of over 35 knots (65 km/h; 40 mph). The ship is armed with one BAE Mk 38 25-millimetre (0.98 in) gun and two M2 Browning machine guns. The patrol ship has an onboard hangar and flight deck for helicopters up to the size of a Sikorsky CH-148 Cyclone. Robert Hampton Gray has a complement of 65 and accommodation for 87.
