= HMCS William Hall =

Royal Canadian Navy offshore patrol vessel

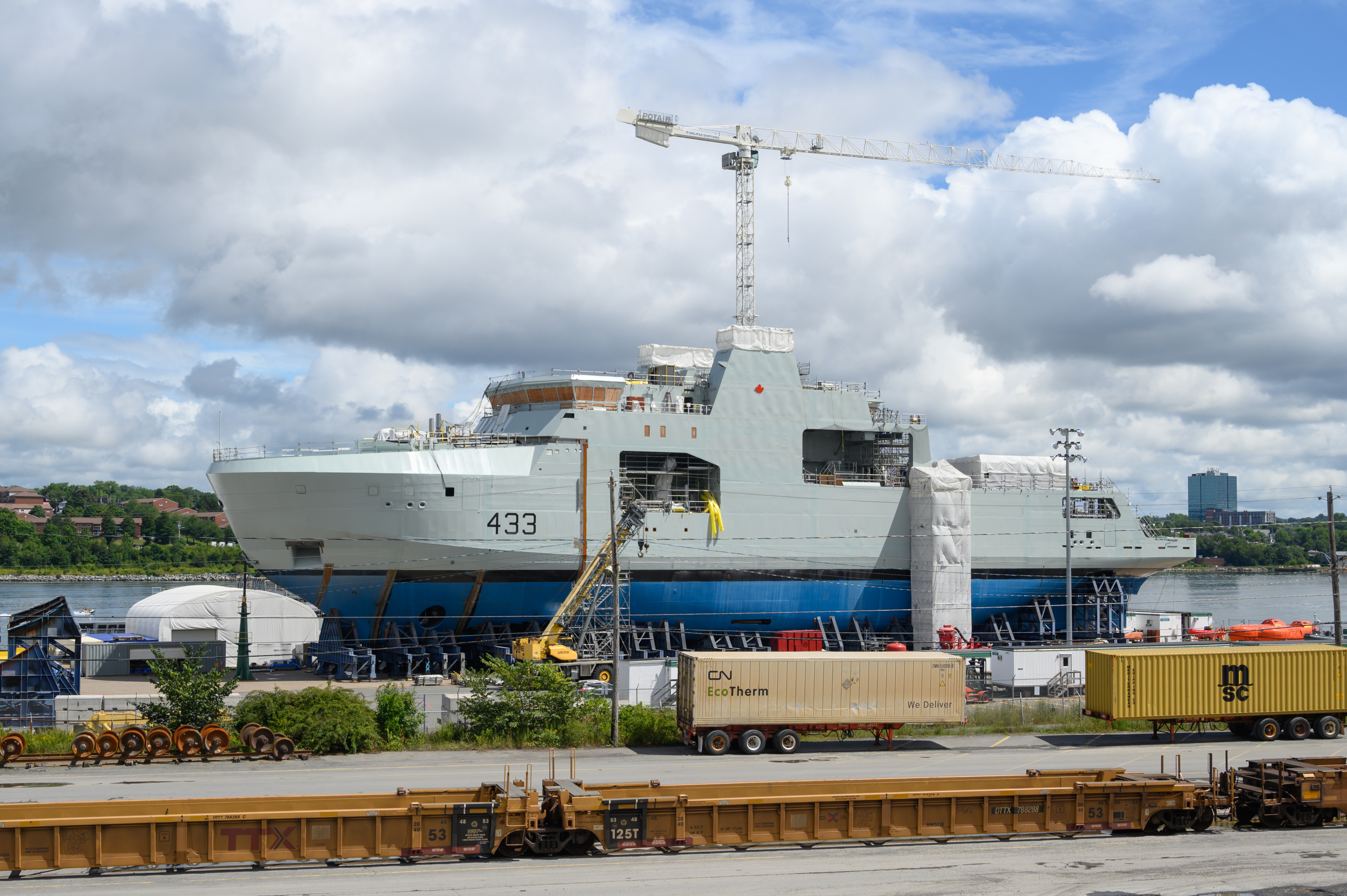
- HMCS William Hall under construction in Halifax, Canada

History

Canada
- Name: William Hall
- Namesake: William Hall
- Builder: Irving Shipbuilding, Halifax, Nova Scotia
- Laid down: 17 February 2021
- Launched: 27 November 2022
- Completed: 31 August 2023
- Commissioned: 16 May 2024
- Home port: Halifax
- Identification: Hull number: AOPV 433; IMO number: 4702539; Call sign: CGWH
- Motto: Nec timemus nec vacillamus (Latin for 'We do not fear or falter')
- Status: In service

General characteristics
- Type: Harry DeWolf-class offshore patrol vessel
- Displacement: 6,615 t (6,511 long tons)
- Length: 103.6 m (339 ft 11 in)
- Beam: 19.0 m (62 ft 4 in)
- Draught: 5.7 m (18 ft 8 in)
- Ice class: Polar Class 5
- Installed power: 4 × MAN 6L32/44CR (4 × 3.6 MW)
- Propulsion: Diesel-electric; Two shafts (2 × 4.5 MW); Bow thruster
- Speed: 17 kn (31 km/h; 20 mph) (open water); 3 kn (5.6 km/h; 3.5 mph) in 1 m (3 ft 3 in) ice
- Range: 6,800 nmi (12,600 km; 7,800 mi) at 14 kn (26 km/h; 16 mph)
- Boats & landing craft carried: 2 × 8.5 m (28 ft) multi-role rescue boats; 12 m (39 ft) landing craft
- Complement: 65
- Armament: 1 × BAE Mk 38 25 mm (0.98 in) gun; 2 × M2 Browning machine gun
- Aircraft carried: Sikorsky CH-148 Cyclone or other helicopters/CU-176 Gargoyle UAV
- Aviation facilities: Hangar and flight deck

HMCS William Hall (AOPV 433) is the fourth Harry DeWolf-class offshore patrol vessel for the Royal Canadian Navy. The class was derived from the Arctic Offshore Patrol Ship project as part of the National Shipbuilding Procurement Strategy and is primarily designed for the patrol and support of Canada's Arctic regions. Named after Quartermaster William Nelson Edward Hall, who was the first African Canadian to receive the Victoria Cross. He received the medal for his actions in the 1857 Siege of Lucknow during the Indian Rebellion.

== Design and description ==
The Harry DeWolf-class offshore patrol vessels are designed for use in the Arctic regions of Canada for patrol and support within Canada's exclusive economic zone. The vessel is 103.6 m (339 ft 11 in) long overall with a beam of 19.0 m (62 ft 4 in). The ship will have a displacement of 6,615 metric tons (6,511 long tons). The ship has an enclosed foredeck that protects machinery and work spaces from Arctic climates. The vessel will be powered by a diesel-electric system composed of four 3.6-megawatt (4,800 hp) MAN 6L32/44CR four-stroke medium-speed diesel generators and two electric propulsion motors rated at 4.5 megawatts (6,000 hp) driving two shafts. William Hall will be capable of 17 knots (31 km/h; 20 mph) in open water and 3 knots (5.6 km/h; 3.5 mph) in 1-metre (3 ft 3 in) first-year sea ice. The ship will also be equipped with a bow thruster to aid during manoeuvres and docking procedures without requiring tugboat assistance. The ship will have a range of 6,800 nautical miles (12,600 km; 7,800 mi) and an endurance of 120 days with 65 personnel. William Hall will be equipped with fin stabilizers to decrease roll in open water but can be retracted during icebreaking.

William Hall will be able to deploy with multiple payloads, including shipping containers, underwater survey equipment or landing craft. Payload operations are aided by a 20-metric-ton (20-long-ton; 22-short-ton) crane for loading and unloading. The ship is equipped with a vehicle bay which can hold pickup trucks, all-terrain vehicles and snowmobiles. The ship will also have two 8.5-metre (27 ft 11 in) multi-role rescue boats capable of over 35 knots (65 km/h; 40 mph). The ship will be armed with one BAE Mk 38 25 mm (0.98 in) gun and two M2 Browning machine guns. The patrol ship has an onboard hangar and flight deck for helicopters up to the size of a Sikorsky CH-148 Cyclone. William Hall will have a complement of 65 and accommodation for 85 or 87.

== Construction and career ==
The keel for William Hall was laid on 17 February 2021 and the hull floated-out on 27 November 2022. The ship was formally named on 28 April 2023 and began sea trials in July. On 31 August 2023, the Royal Canadian Navy took possession of William Hall to begin post-acceptance trials.

William Hall was in St. John’s Harbour during the first week of March 2024 while on cold weather training exercises. Post-delivery work on William Hall concluded early in 2024 and was followed by readiness training and operational test and evaluation activities assessing class-wide capabilities. The ship was commissioned on 16 May 2024 at Halifax.
