= HMCS Max Bernays =

Royal Canadian Navy offshore patrol vessel

History

Canada
- Name: Max Bernays
- Namesake: Max Bernays
- Builder: Irving Shipbuilding, Halifax, Nova Scotia
- Laid down: 5 December 2018
- Launched: 23 October 2021
- Commissioned: 3 May 2024
- Home port: CFB Esquimalt
- Identification: Hull number: AOPV 432; IMO number: 4702527
- Motto: Interriti impetus (Latin for 'Undaunted by fire')
- Status: In service

General characteristics
- Type: Harry DeWolf-class offshore patrol vessel
- Displacement: 6,615 t (6,511 long tons)
- Length: 103.6 m (339 ft 11 in)
- Beam: 19.0 m (62 ft 4 in)
- Draught: 5.7 m (18 ft 8 in)
- Ice class: Polar Class 5
- Installed power: 4 × MAN 6L32/44CR (4 × 3.6 MW)
- Propulsion: Diesel-electric; Two shafts (2 × 4.5 MW); Bow thruster
- Speed: 17 kn (31 km/h; 20 mph) (open water); 3 kn (5.6 km/h; 3.5 mph) in 1 m (3 ft 3 in) ice
- Range: 6,800 nmi (12,600 km; 7,800 mi) at 14 kn (26 km/h; 16 mph)
- Boats & landing craft carried: 2 × 8.5 m (28 ft) multi-role rescue boats; 12 m (39 ft) landing craft
- Complement: 65
- Armament: 1 × BAE Mk 38 25 mm (0.98 in) gun; 2 × M2 Browning machine gun
- Aircraft carried: Sikorsky CH-148 Cyclone or other helicopters/CU-176 Gargoyle UAV
- Aviation facilities: Hangar and flight deck

HMCS Max Bernays (AOPV 432) is the third Harry DeWolf-class offshore patrol vessel for the Royal Canadian Navy. The class was derived from the Arctic Offshore Patrol Ship project as part of the National Shipbuilding Procurement Strategy and is primarily designed for the patrol and support of Canada's Arctic regions.

== Design and description ==
The Harry DeWolf-class offshore patrol vessels are designed for use in the Arctic regions of Canada for patrol and support within Canada's exclusive economic zone. The vessel is 103.6 m (339 ft 11 in) long overall with a beam of 19.0 m (62 ft 4 in). The ship has a displacement of 6,615 metric tons (6,511 long tons). The ship has an enclosed foredeck that protects machinery and work spaces from Arctic climates. The vessel is powered by a diesel-electric system composed of four 3.6-megawatt (4,800 hp) MAN 6L32/44CR four-stroke medium-speed diesel generators and two electric propulsion motors rated at 4.5 megawatts (6,000 hp) driving two shafts. Max Bernays is capable of 17 knots (31 km/h; 20 mph) in open water and 3 knots (5.6 km/h; 3.5 mph) in 1-metre (3 ft 3 in) first-year sea ice. The ship is also equipped with a bow thruster to aid during manoeuvres and docking procedures without requiring tugboat assistance. The ship has a range of 6,800 nautical miles (12,600 km; 7,800 mi) and an endurance of 120 days. Max Bernays is equipped with fin stabilizers to decrease roll in open water, which can be retracted during icebreaking.

Max Bernays is able to deploy with multiple payloads, including shipping containers, underwater survey equipment or landing craft. Payload operations are aided by a 20-metric-ton (20-long-ton; 22-short-ton) crane for loading and unloading. The ship is equipped with a vehicle bay which can hold pickup trucks, all-terrain vehicles and snowmobiles. The ship also has two 8.5-metre (27 ft 11 in) multi-role rescue boats capable of over 35 knots (65 km/h; 40 mph). The ship is armed with one BAE Mk 38 25 mm (0.98 in) gun and two M2 Browning machine guns. The patrol ship has an onboard hangar and flight deck for helicopters up to the size of a Sikorsky CH-148 Cyclone. Max Bernays has a complement of 65 and accommodation for 85 or 87.

== Construction and career ==
HMCS Max Bernays docked at The Shipyards in North Vancouver during the Marine Career Expo Event, 2026

The patrol vessel's keel was laid down on 5 December 2018 by Irving Shipbuilding at Halifax, Nova Scotia. The ship was launched on 23 October 2021, and was delivered to the Royal Canadian Navy 2 September 2022. The naming ceremony was conducted on 29 May 2022 in conjunction with that for sister ship Margaret Brooke. The ship began sea trials in July 2022. The ship was delivered to the RCN in September 2022 for post-acceptance trials and it was indicated that she would be the first vessel of her class to be based in the Pacific region, starting in 2023.

On 11 March 2024, Max Bernays left Halifax for its new homeport at Esquimalt, British Columbia, with Canadian Fleet Pacific. The vessel was commissioned on 3 May 2024 in the presence of Anne, Princess Royal. In mid 2024, Max Bernays took part in the multi-national exercise RIMPAC 2024 along with the supply ship Asterix and the frigate Vancouver. In September Max Bernays was deployed to Japan to monitor any North Korean-flagged vessels in the region for potential violations of UN sanctions.

In October 2025, Max Bernays was involved in the Sama Sama 2025 exercises. In June 2026, Max Bernays visited Portland, Oregon. In July and August 2026, she participated in joint patrols with United States Coast Guard vessels in the Bering Sea as part of Operation Tundra Merlin, a U.S.-Canadian Arctic training exercise.
