= Harry DeWolf-class offshore patrol vessel =

Class of Offshore Patrol Vessels

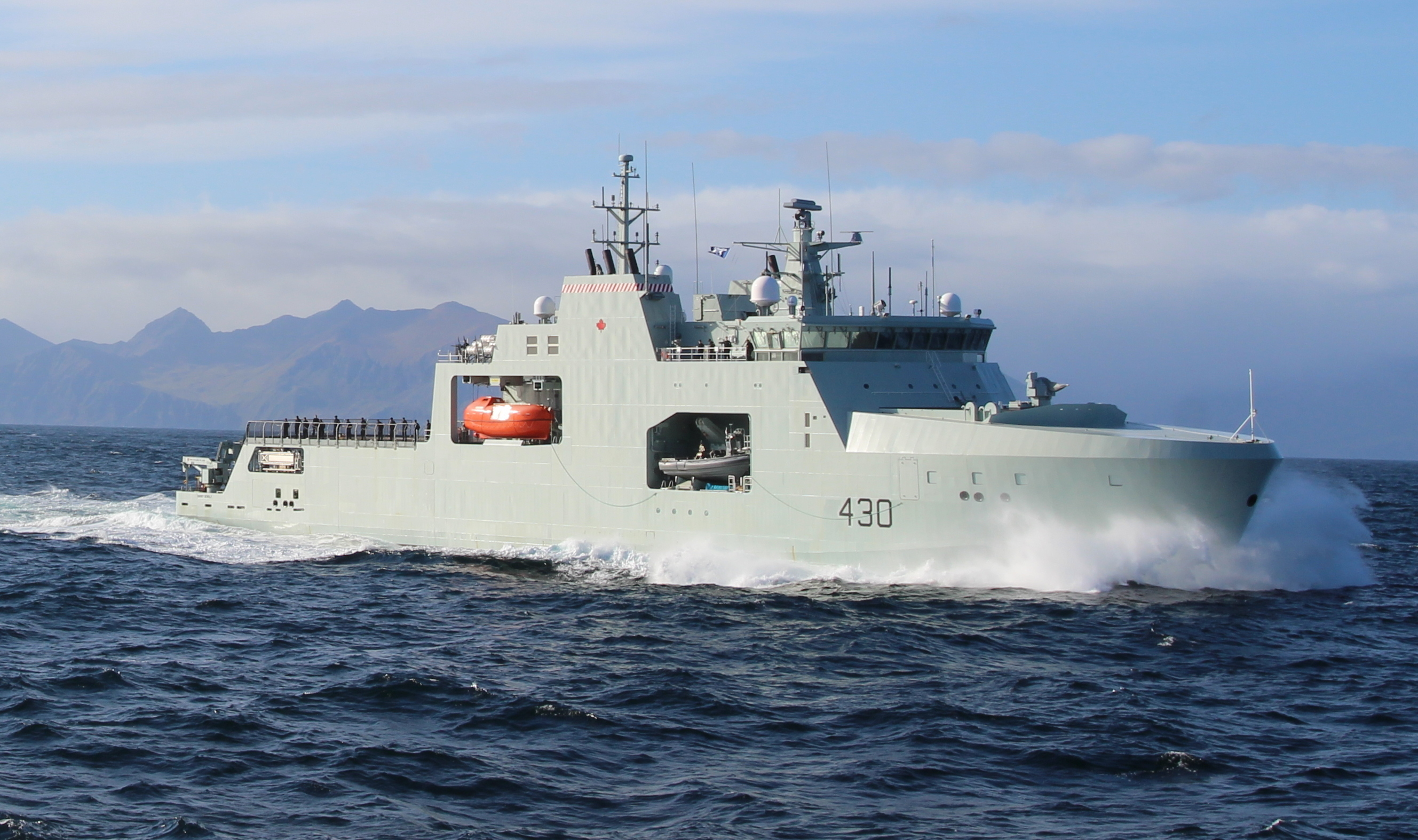
- HMCS Harry DeWolf under way in September 2021

Class overview
- Name: Harry DeWolf class
- Builders: Halifax Shipyards
- Operators: Royal Canadian Navy; (Canada) Canadian Coast Guard (planned)
- Preceded by: None
- Cost: CA$3.5 billion (initial design and build); CA$2.3 billion (for construction of six vessels); CA$4.3 billion (2018 estimate); CA$4.98 billion (2023 estimate for first six Navy ships) + CA$2.1 billion (2024 estimate for two Coast Guard variants)
- Built: 2016–present
- In commission: 2021–present
- Planned: 8 (6 for RCN and 2 for CCG)
- Building: 2 (for CCG)
- Completed: 6
- Active: 6

General characteristics
- Type: Arctic/offshore patrol vessel
- Displacement: 6,615 t (6,511 long tons)
- Length: 103.6 m (339 ft 11 in)
- Beam: 19 m (62 ft 4 in)
- Draught: 5.7 m (18 ft 8 in)
- Ice class: Polar Class 5
- Installed power: 4 × MAN 6L32/44CR (4 × 3.6 MW)
- Propulsion: Diesel-electric; Two shafts (2 × 4.5 MW); Bow thruster
- Speed: 17 kn (31 km/h; 20 mph) (open water); 3 kn (5.6 km/h; 3.5 mph) in 1 m (3 ft 3 in) ice
- Range: 6,800 nmi (12,600 km; 7,800 mi) at 14 kn (26 km/h; 16 mph)
- Endurance: 120 days
- Boats & landing craft carried: 2 × 8.5 m (28 ft) multi-role rescue boats by Rosborough Boats; 12 m (39 ft) landing craft by ABCO Industries
- Complement: 65 (RCN). Accommodation for 87 additional mission crew
- Sensors & processing systems: Combat Management System: Lockheed Martin Canada CMS 330; Tactical data Link: SATCOM (Link 16); Terma SCANTER 6002 surveillance radar system; Multichannel VHF/HF Radio; Thales BlueGate Identification Friend or Foe (IFF) system; OSI Maritime Systems; Integrated Bridge Navigational System; Kelvin Hughes SharpEye X and S-band navigation radars; BlueNaute inertial navigation system; SAGEM Damage/Machinery Control Systems
- Armament: 1 × BAE Mk 38 25 mm (0.98 in) gun; 2 × M2 Browning machine gun
- Aircraft carried: Sikorsky CH-148 Cyclone or Bell CH-146 Griffon; CU-176 Gargoyle UAV
- Aviation facilities: Onboard hangar and flight deck; Vehicle bay; can hold pickup trucks, ATVs and snowmobiles; Quarterdeck; space for multiple modular payload options such as standard shipping containers
- Notes: Six containerized active/passive towed array sonars are planned to be procured for the ship class under Containerized Onboard Reelable Array (COBRA) project.

Harry DeWolf-class offshore patrol vessels are warships of the Royal Canadian Navy (RCN) built within the Government of Canada Arctic and Offshore Patrol Ship (AOPS) procurement project, part of the National Shipbuilding Strategy. In July 2007 the federal government announced plans for acquiring six to eight icebreaking warships for the RCN.

The vessels are modelled on the Norwegian Coast Guard NoCGV Svalbard and as of 2007 were projected to cost CA$3.5 billion to construct with a total project procurement budgeted to cost $4.3 billion in order to cover maintenance over the 25-year lifespan of the vessels. In 2018 it was reported that the cost of the first six ships had increased by $810 million over previous projections. In 2023 it was reported that the cost for the first six ships had increased by a further $780 million and that of the two envisaged vessels for the Coast Guard by an additional $100 million.

The lead ship of the class was announced as Harry DeWolf in September 2014, and four additional ships were named in 2015. Construction of the ships Harry DeWolf and Margaret Brooke started at the Halifax Shipyards in September 2015 and September 2016, respectively. Harry DeWolf and Margaret Brooke were originally planned to be delivered in 2019 and 2020 respectively. Harry DeWolf was officially launched on 15 September 2018. Margaret Brooke was launched on 10 November 2019. Max Bernays began construction in December 2017 and William Hall was also planned to begin in 2017, although construction was delayed to early 2019. Max Bernays was launched in October 2021, and was followed by William Hall in 2022. Frédérick Rolette was scheduled to begin construction in 2019, with construction on Robert Hampton Gray expected to begin in 2021. However, in 2020 it was confirmed that ships five and six (Frédérick Rolette and Robert Hampton Gray) would not begin construction until 2021 and 2022 respectively. Frédérick Rolette was launched in 2023, while Robert Hampton Gray was launched in 2024.

On 22 May 2019, an official announcement was made to begin the process of building two vessels for the Canadian Coast Guard, bringing the total number of ships in the class to eight. The first of the two, CCGS Donjek, was launched in 2026.

== Project history ==
In 2006 Prime Minister Stephen Harper had spoken about building three to four icebreakers capable of travelling through thick ice in the Arctic Ocean. In 2007 it was announced that the Canadian Armed Forces would purchase six to eight patrol ships having an ice class of Polar Class 5, meaning that they were capable of limited icebreaking, based on the Norwegian Svalbard class. This announcement was met with some controversy, and the proposed ships have been called "slush-breakers", by Dr. Gary Stern, a scientist aboard CCGS Amundsen, and Jack Layton of the NDP. However, it was notable that in 2005 of the nineteen Canadian Coast Guard icebreakers then in service, only six had an ice class higher than Polar Class 5.

In 2010 the Arctic and Offshore Patrol Ship Project was grouped with several other federal government ship procurement projects for the Royal Canadian Navy and Canadian Coast Guard into the National Shipbuilding Procurement Strategy (NSPS). The NSPS announced on 19 October 2011 that Irving Shipbuilding would be awarded the $25 billion contract to build six to eight Arctic patrol ships as well as fifteen other warships for the RCN over the next two decades.

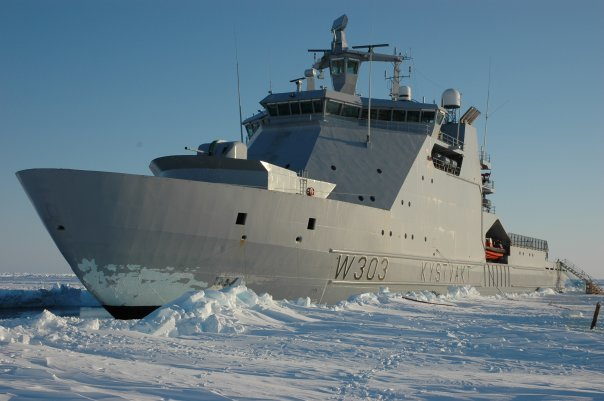
Norwegian Coast Guard vessel NoCGV Svalbard, on which the Harry DeWolf class design is modelled

In September 2014, Prime Minister Stephen Harper announced that the name of the first ship in the class would be Harry DeWolf, named in honour of wartime Canadian naval hero Harry DeWolf, and that the class would be named the Harry DeWolf class. In December it was found that not enough money had been projected to cover the cost of building the six to eight planned ships and that the budget would need to be increased, delaying the signing of the contract. However, in an effort to drive down costs, Irving Shipbuilding could only project building five ships with the option to build a sixth only if it came under budget. The budget for the project was increased from $3.1 billion to $3.5 billion to ensure a cash buffer. However, by 2018 that approach had been abandoned and the budget for the first six ships had reportedly increased to $4.3 billion.

On 13 April 2015 the government announced a second ship would be named Margaret Brooke in honour of Sub-Lieutenant Margaret Brooke, a Royal Canadian Navy Nursing Sister decorated for heroism for her efforts to save a fellow nursing sister after the sinking of the ferry SS Caribou during World War II. The third ship will be named Max Bernays for Chief Petty Officer Max Bernays who served aboard HMCS Assiniboine during the Second World War and was decorated for his actions during the sinking of the German submarine U-210. The fourth ship will be named for William Hall, a Victoria Cross (VC) recipient from Nova Scotia and the first black person to be awarded the VC, for his actions during the Siege of Lucknow. The fifth ship will be named for Frédérick Rolette, a French-Canadian sailor of Canada's Provincial Marine under the Royal Navy who, during the War of 1812, was second-in-command of the ship Lady Prevost at the Battle of Lake Erie, and led the capture of the American supply vessel Cayahoga Packet, in July 1812, an action instrumental in contributing to the capture of Detroit one month later.

On 2 November 2018, the option for the sixth ship was taken up. In 2020 it was confirmed that the sixth ship would be named for Robert Hampton Gray, posthumously awarded the Victoria Cross for gallantry during World War II while serving with the Royal Navy's Fleet Air Arm in the Pacific theatre. The cost of the sixth vessel is expected to be higher due to the tariffs on steel and aluminum imposed by both Canada and the United States.

On 22 May 2019, it was announced that two more ships would be built for the Canadian Coast Guard.

The Fall 2022 Special Edition of the Maritime Engineering Journal (No. 102) is dedicated to a comprehensive review of the Arctic and Offshore Patrol Ship project with the subtitle: "An insider's look at the Royal Canadian Navy's new capability".

=== Construction ===
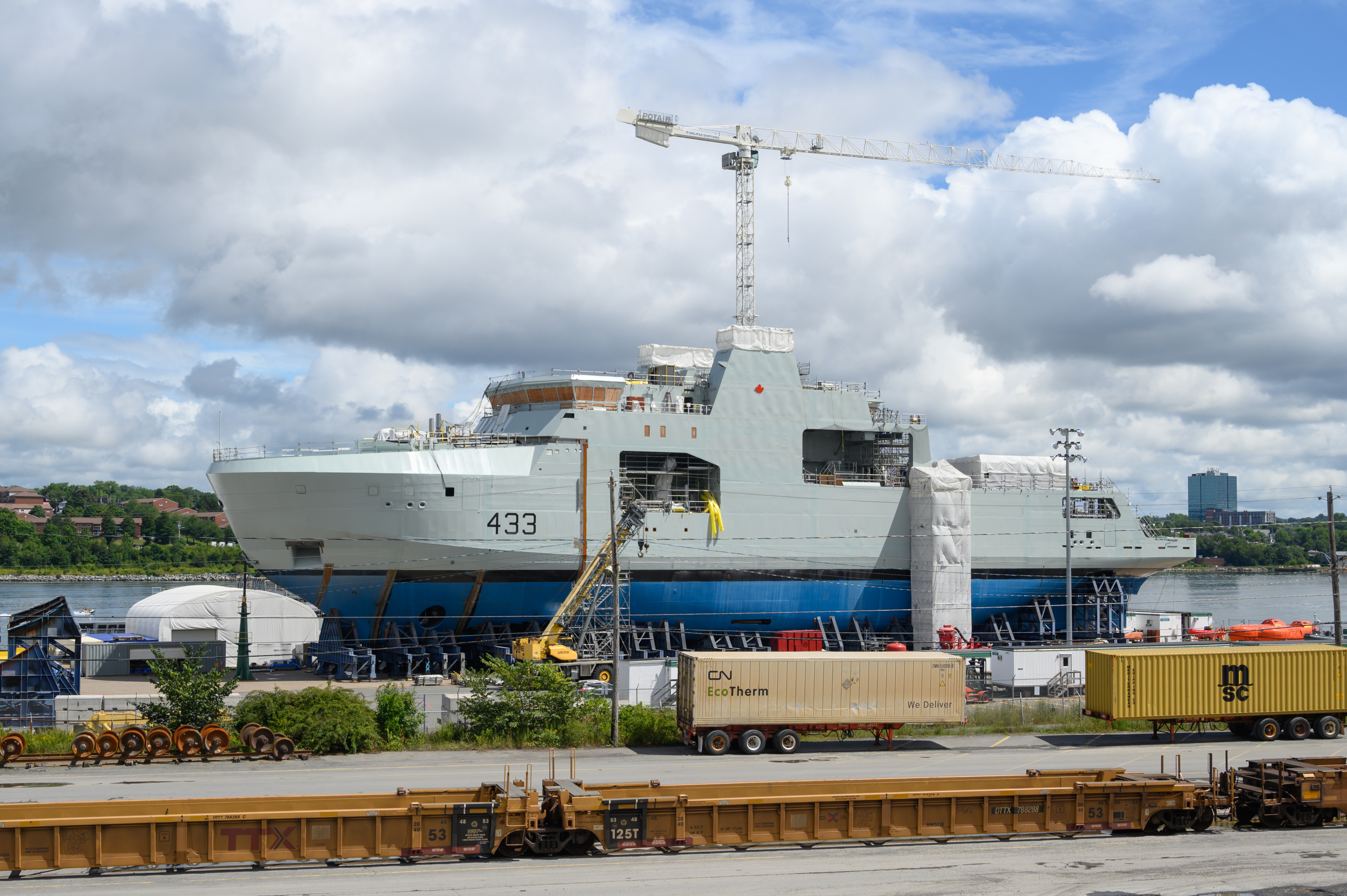
HMCS William Hall under construction in August 2022

On 18 June 2015 it was reported that the construction of test modules for the lead ship of the class Harry DeWolf was underway. The first sections of keel were placed on 11 March 2016, but the official laying of the keel of Harry DeWolf was held on 9 June 2016, marking the first naval construction in Canada since 1998, and the largest purposefully-built warship for the RCN in over 50 years. In September 2016, it was announced that construction had begun on Margaret Brooke and that 50 of 64 modular pieces of Harry DeWolf had been completed. On 8 December 2017, the three main sections of Harry DeWolf were fitted into place. The first steel for Max Bernays was cut on 19 December 2017. Construction of William Hall started on 3 May 2019. Margaret Brooke was launched on 10 November 2019. First steel was cut for the fifth ship, Frédérick Rolette, in May 2021 and for sixth ship, Robert Hampton Gray, in August 2022.

During the COVID-19 pandemic, Irving Shipbuilding announced that construction would be halted for at least three weeks beginning in March 2020. Harry DeWolf was delivered to the Navy in July 2020, and commissioned on 26 June 2021. Margaret Brooke was delivered on 15 July 2021 and commissioned on 28 October 2022. The two Coast Guard AOPS variants (ships seven and eight) were expected to begin construction in 2022 and 2023. In January 2023, it was announced that work on the additional ships would begin in the course of 2023. On 9 December 2024, the sixth and final ship of the RCN, Robert Hampton Gray, was launched at Halifax Shipyard.

==== Potable water contamination ====
In December 2022, it was discovered that the potable water systems of all the delivered and launched ships had suspected lead contamination from fittings and valves that were manufactured from alloys that exceeded the allowable amount of lead. The ships affected by the contamination were Harry DeWolf, Margaret Brooke, and Max Bernays. William Hall would be tested for the contamination after the completion of construction.

=== Criticism ===
The Harry DeWolf class has been criticized for its design and effectiveness, as critics believe that the class is ineffective in its designated role of Arctic and offshore patrol. Some criticism focuses on the fact that the ships are slow and, compared to the similarly sized Russian Project 23550 patrol ships armed with 3M-54 Kalibr anti-ship missiles, underarmed. However, others believe that the ships' capabilities are sufficient given their largely constabulary mission, and are in line with existing naval and coast guard vessels of other Arctic nations.

In April 2013, the Rideau Institute and the Canadian Centre for Policy Alternatives released a report on the proposed AOPS. The report was written by UBC Professor Michael Byers and Stewart Webb. The report's conclusion was that Canada would be better suited to have purpose-built ships, namely icebreakers for the Arctic and offshore patrol vessels for the Pacific and Atlantic coasts.

In May 2013, the CBC reported that the cost of the design phase of the project was many times what other countries paid for design, construction, and full-up operational deployment of similar ships. The projected design cost of the AOPS, $288 million, was compared primarily to the Norwegian icebreaking offshore patrol vessel Svalbard that was designed and built for less than $100 million in 2002, and whose basic design documentation package was purchased by Canada for $5 million. Shipbuilding experts interviewed by CBC estimated that the design cost of the AOPS should have been $10–20 million even if accounting for cost of adapting the Norwegian design to Canadian service. The $288 million design cost was further compared to two European offshore patrol vessel classes that, while significantly cheaper to design and build, have only one third of the AOPS' displacement. Furthermore, the Danish Knud Rasmussen class has much lower ice-going capability than the AOPS and the Irish Samuel Beckett class is not ice-capable at all. Additionally, the AOPS have far more significant aviation capabilities than either the Danish or Irish ships.

=== Future developments ===
As the Harry Dewolf-class ships started to enter service, comments appeared in Canadian professional military journals suggesting that they might be useful as small amphibious ships carrying up to 50 to 60 soldiers/marine infantry into the Arctic.

A 2024 defence policy report included the intent to purchase ocean surveillance sensors for the ships.

=== Northern affiliations ===
In 2017, each of the six ships was affiliated with one of the six Inuit regions in Northern Canada; Qikiqtaaluk, Kitikmeot, Kivalliq, Nunavik, Nunatsiavut, and Inuvialuit. These affiliations are meant to build connections with Inuit communities where the Harry DeWolf class serve. As part of this plan, all ships will have a design painted by Indigenous artists placed on their smokestacks, with this art representing that specific region. HMCS Harry DeWolf carries a narwhal, as a partnership with the Qikiqtani peoples. Other ships in class already have followed, or are expected to.

=== Crewing problems ===
In November 2023, Vice-Admiral Angus Topshee, the commander of the RCN, said that due to serious personnel recruitment and retention problems in the navy, notably an absence of marine technicians, only one of the new Harry DeWolf-class ships was actually being crewed at any given time. By February/March 2024 these crewing problems had been reduced/solved, as demonstrated by the simultaneous deployments of Max Bernays (sailing between Canada's Atlantic and Pacific coasts via the Panama Canal) and Margaret Brooke (to the Caribbean Sea). Both Harry DeWolf and Margaret Brooke participated in Nanook 2024, which was led by the Canadian Armed Forces.

== Design ==
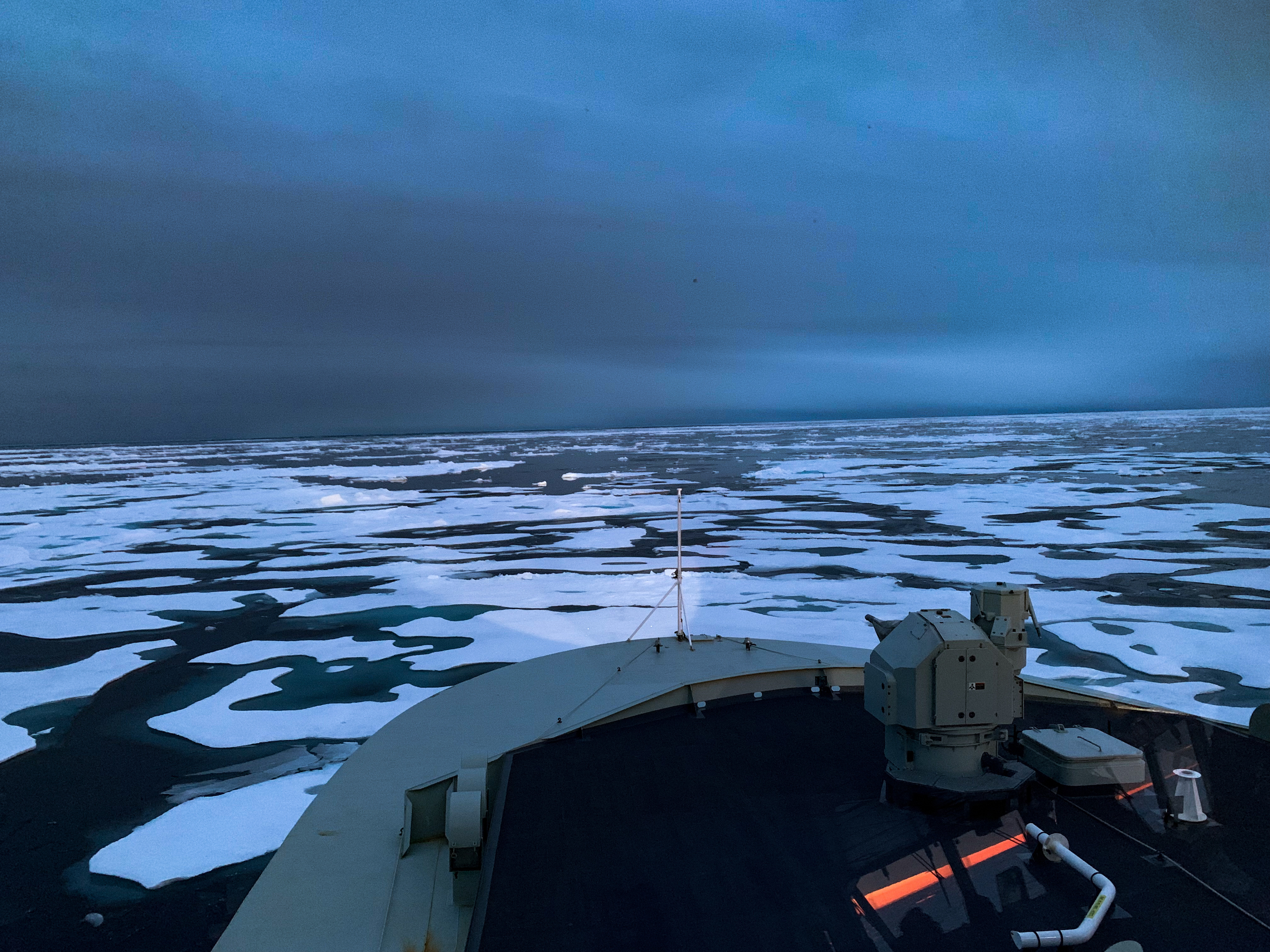
HMCS Harry DeWolf, shown transiting through icy waters in the Northwest Passage, has a Polar Class 5 rating.

The AOPS was initially envisaged to feature azimuth thrusters and a double-acting hull form that would incorporate a moderate icebreaking bow for cruising in open water and light ice, and an icebreaking stern designed for heavier ice conditions. After a conventional twin-shaft layout similar to existing Canadian Coast Guard icebreakers was selected following a cost-benefit analysis, the hull form was optimized for bow-first icebreaking with a rounded spoon-shaped stem. The vessels' ice class is Polar Class 5, but the bow region is further strengthened to higher Polar Class 4 level. A bow thruster enables manoeuvering and berthing without tug assistance.

In May 2008, a contract was awarded to BMT Fleet Technology and Aker Yards Marine (renamed STX Canada Marine few months later; today Vard Marine) to assist in developing technical specifications and a design for the project. The technical specifications were to be used to draft a request for proposals. The government later awarded a design contract to the same companies to develop the design of the vessel for issue to the selected NSPS proponent.

The ships are built in three large megablocks: centre, aft and bow. The megablocks combined consist of 62 smaller building blocks. The first steel was cut on Harry DeWolf in September 2015.

The ships are designed to displace 6,440 metric tons (6,340 long tons), making them the largest class of naval vessels produced in Canada in the past 50 years, with the previous being the retired Protecteur-class replenishment oiler. They are capable of outfitting multiple payload options such as shipping containers, underwater survey equipment, or a landing craft. The vessels have a 20-tonne and a 3-tonne crane to self-load/unload, and a vehicle bay to carry vehicles for deployment over the ice. The design also calls for an enclosed cable deck and forecastle to better cope with the Arctic environment. On the open sea, the ships have fin stabilizers to reduce roll that are retractable during ice operations.

=== Armament ===
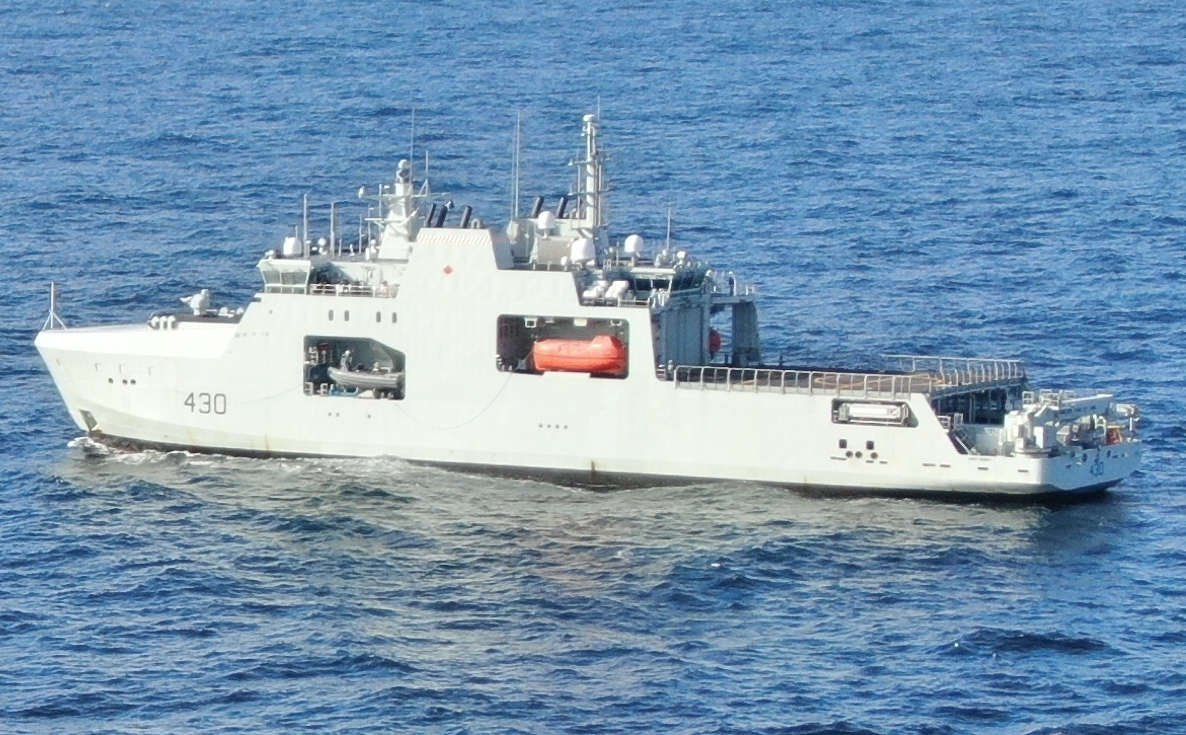
The Harry DeWolf class has a flight deck at its stern

In August 2015, BAE Systems won the contract to provide up to six modified Mk 38 Mod 3A 25 mm cannon for the naval ships in the class (the coast guard ships will be unarmed, as CCG has no enforcement mandate). This contract also covers the service life of the weapons.

=== Bridge and navigation system ===
In 2014 OSI Maritime Systems Ltd. was selected by Lockheed Martin Canada to design the integrated bridge and navigation system for the AOPS program, this was followed by a contract for the Implementation Phase in 2015. Since, OSI has built and installed all AOPS Integrated Bridge and Navigation ship sets.

=== Propulsion and power ===
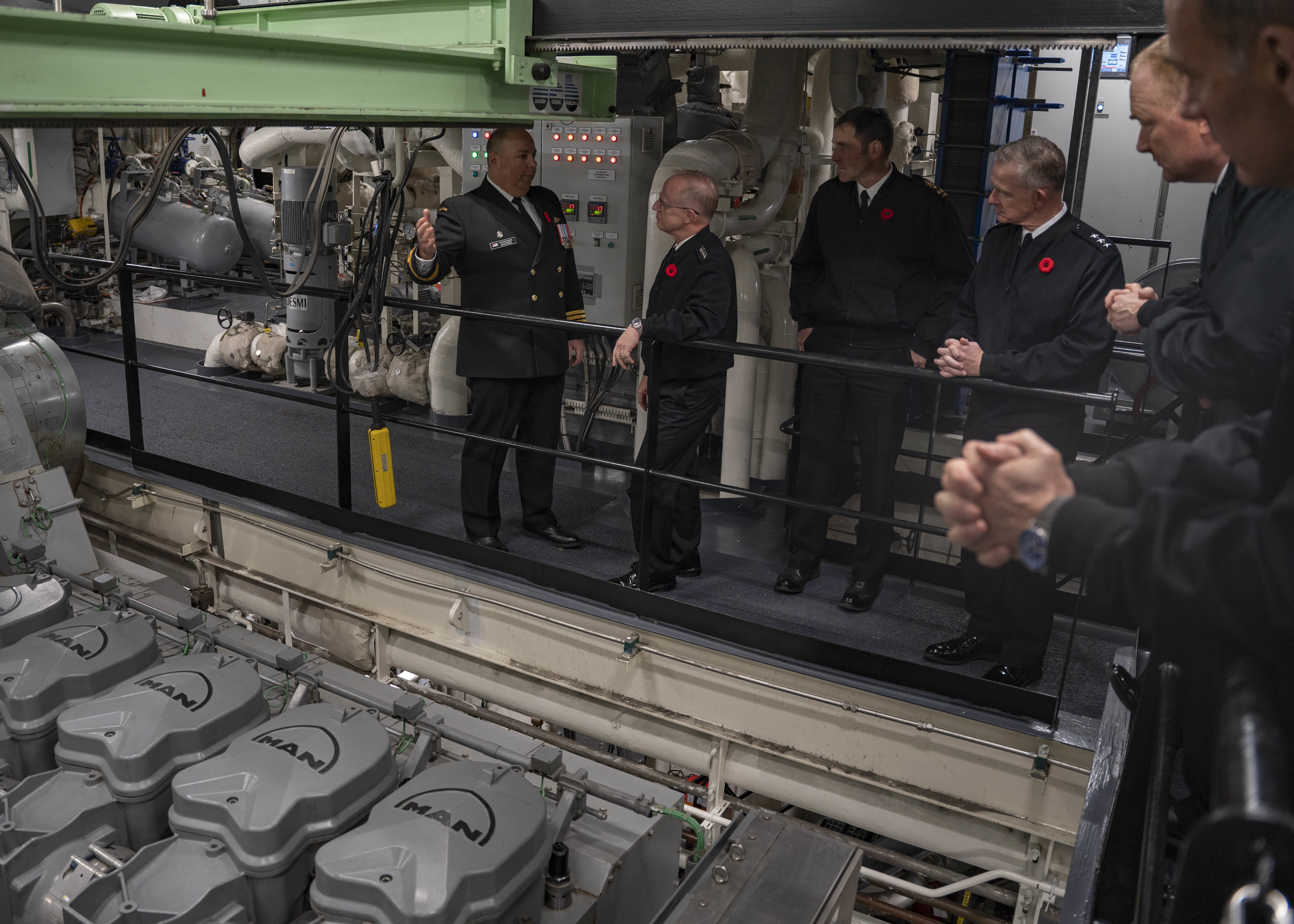
Main engines on HMCS Max Bernays

The vessels have a diesel-electric powertrain with four 3.6-megawatt (4,800 hp) MAN 6L32/44CR four-stroke medium-speed diesel generators producing electricity for two 4.5-megawatt (6,000 hp) propulsion motors driving twin shaft lines with bolted propellers.

=== Sensors ===
In September 2015, it was announced that the ships would be outfitted with SAGEM BlueNaute inertial navigation systems. On 7 October 2015, Thales IFF system was selected for use on the class. Terma currently provides its SCANTER 6002 surveillance radar system to Lockheed Martin Canada as part of the Combat Management System (CMS 330), which was selected by Irving Shipbuilding Inc. for the AOPS. The vessel also has Kelvin Hughes SharpEye X and S-band navigation radars.

=== Coast Guard version ===
The Canadian Coast Guard version will be built to a slightly modified design. Modifications include a new bridge layout and accommodations for a non-military crew subject to Transport Canada requirements. Some areas are to be changed to meet the needs of coast guard equipment and there will be modifications to the deck. Despite the supposedly limited modifications, the cost of the two Coast Guard variants was reported in 2022 as likely to be significantly higher than that of the naval variants. In 2023, it was reported that the cost of the two Coast Guard variants had increased by a further $100 million, going from $1.5 billion to $1.6 billion. A further increase to $2.1 billion was reported in early 2024. The first of the Coast Guard ships was laid down during a ceremony on 31 July 2024. The first ship is named CCGS Donjek after the Donjek Glacier in Kluane National Park in Yukon. The second Coast Guard ship, named CCGS Sermilik, takes its name from the Sermilik Glacier found in Sirmilik National Park in Nunavut.

== Ships in class ==
Class	Ship name	Number	First steel cut	Laid down	Launched	Delivered	Commissioned	Northern affiliation	Status
Harry DeWolf class	Harry DeWolf	AOPV 430	1 September 2015	11 March 2016	15 September 2018	31 July 2020	26 June 2021	Qikiqtani	Ship in active service
Harry DeWolf class	Margaret Brooke	AOPV 431	August 2016	29 May 2017	10 November 2019	15 July 2021	28 October 2022	Nunatsiavut	Ship in active service
Harry DeWolf class	Max Bernays	AOPV 432	19 December 2017	5 December 2018	23 October 2021	2 September 2022	3 May 2024	Kitikmeot	Ship in active service
Harry DeWolf class	William Hall	AOPV 433	3 May 2019	17 February 2021	27 November 2022	31 August 2023	16 May 2024	Kivalliq	Ship in active service
Harry DeWolf class	Frédérick Rolette	AOPV 434	May 2021	29 June 2022	9 December 2023	29 August 2024	13 June 2025	Nunavik	Ship in active service
Harry DeWolf class	Robert Hampton Gray	AOPV 435	August 2022	21 August 2023	9 December 2024	21 August 2025	16 November 2026	Inuvialuit	Ship in active service
AOPS – Coast Guard variant	Donjek		8 August 2023	31 July 2024	28 April 2026		Projected 2026		Sea trials
AOPS – Coast Guard variant	Sermilik		28 June 2024	6 November 2025			Projected 2027		Under construction

== See also ==
- List of current ships of the Royal Canadian Navy
- Nanisivik Naval Facility
