= HMCS Margaret Brooke =

Royal Canadian Navy offshore patrol vessel

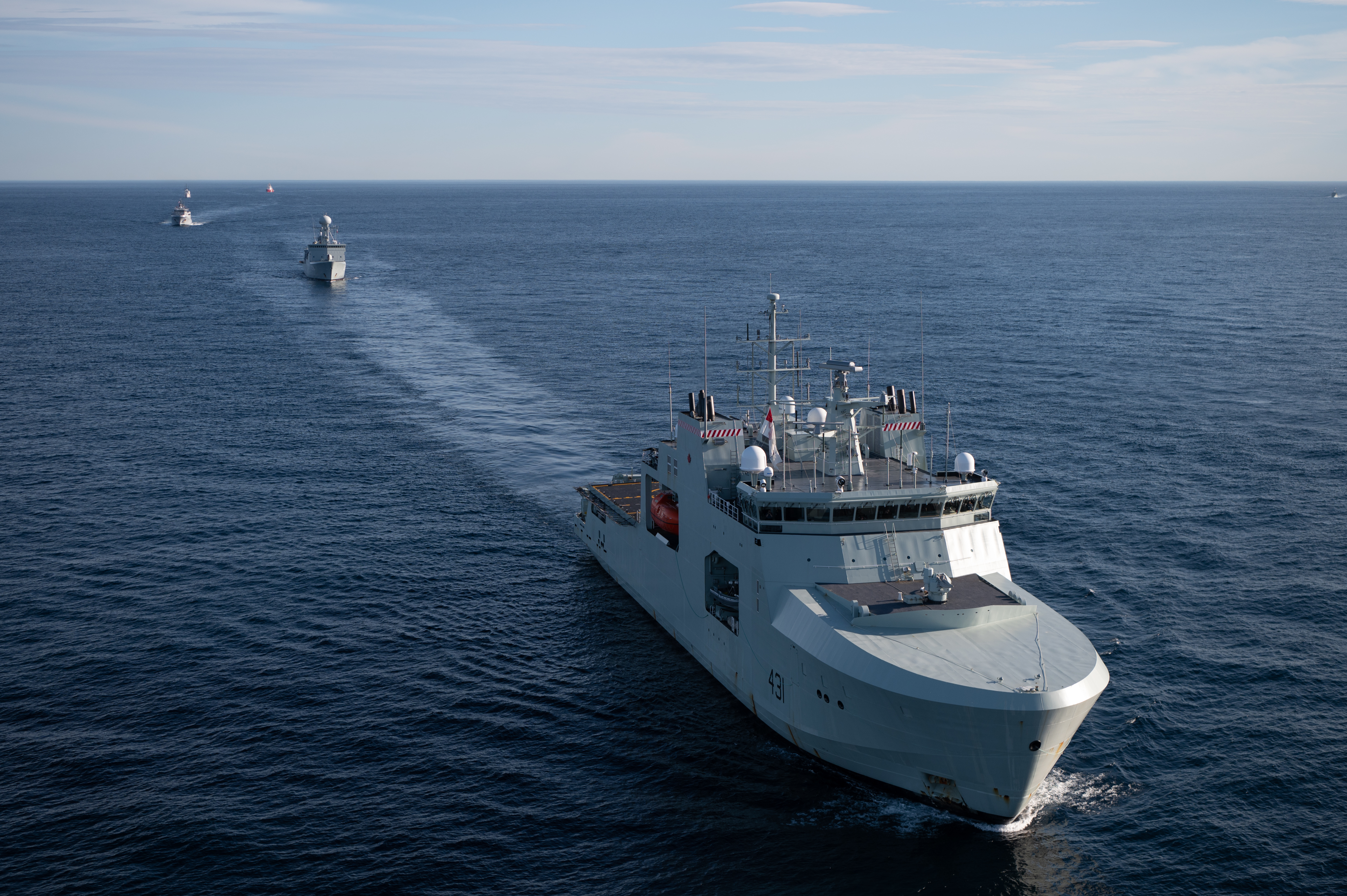
- HMCS Margaret Brooke participates in Operation Nanook, 2022

History

Canada
- Name: Margaret Brooke
- Namesake: Margaret Brooke
- Ordered: 19 October 2011
- Builder: Irving Shipbuilding, Halifax, Nova Scotia
- Laid down: 29 May 2017
- Launched: 10 November 2019
- Commissioned: 28 October 2022
- Home port: Halifax
- Identification: Hull number: AOPV 431; IMO number: 4702515; MMSI number: 316014540; Call sign: CGMB
- Motto: Magnanimi sunt fortes (Latin for 'Merciful are the brave')
- Status: In service
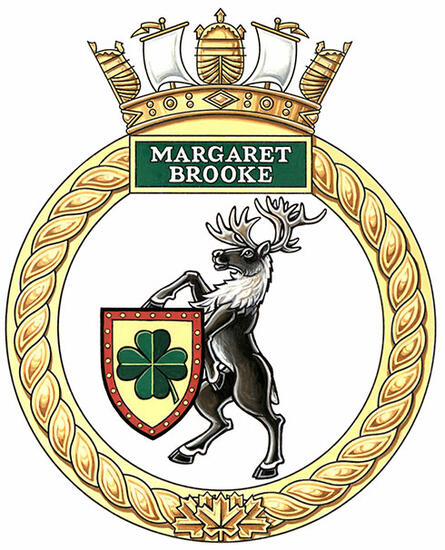
- Badge

General characteristics
- Type: Harry DeWolf-class offshore patrol vessel
- Displacement: 6,615 t (6,511 long tons)
- Length: 103.6 m (339 ft 11 in)
- Beam: 19.0 m (62 ft 4 in)
- Draught: 5.7 m (18 ft 8 in)
- Ice class: Polar Class 5
- Installed power: 4 × MAN 6L32/44CR (4 × 3.6 MW)
- Propulsion: Diesel-electric; Two shafts (2 × 4.5 MW); Bow thruster
- Speed: 17 kn (31 km/h; 20 mph) (open water); 3 kn (5.6 km/h; 3.5 mph) in 1 m (3 ft 3 in) ice
- Range: 6,800 nmi (12,600 km; 7,800 mi) at 14 kn (26 km/h; 16 mph)
- Boats & landing craft carried: 2 × 8.5 m (28 ft) multi-role rescue boats; 12 m (39 ft) landing craft
- Complement: 65
- Armament: 1 × BAE Mk 38 25 mm gun; 2 × M2 Browning machine gun
- Aircraft carried: Sikorsky CH-148 Cyclone or other helicopters/CU-176 Gargoyle UAV
- Aviation facilities: Hangar and flight deck

HMCS Margaret Brooke (AOPV 431) is the second Harry DeWolf-class offshore patrol vessel for the Royal Canadian Navy (RCN). The class was derived from the Arctic Offshore Patrol Ship project as part of the National Shipbuilding Procurement Strategy and is primarily designed for the patrol and support of Canada's Arctic regions. Named after Sub-Lieutenant Margaret Brooke, an RCN nursing sister who tried to save another person during the sinking of the ferry SS Caribou during World War II. Margaret Brooke was ordered in 2011, laid down in 2016 and launched in 2019. The vessel began contractor sea trials in May 2021, and she was delivered to the Royal Canadian Navy for post-acceptance sea trials on 15 July 2021. The official naming ceremony for the ship was conducted on 29 May 2022 in conjunction with that for sister ship Max Bernays. The vessel was commissioned on 28 October 2022.

== Design and description ==
The Harry DeWolf-class offshore patrol vessels are designed for use in the Arctic regions of Canada for patrol and support within Canada's exclusive economic zone. The vessel is 103.6 m (339 ft 11 in) long overall with a beam of 19.0 m (62 ft 4 in). The ship has a displacement of 6,615 metric tons (6,511 long tons). The ship has an enclosed foredeck that protects machinery and work spaces from Arctic climates. The vessel is powered by a diesel-electric system composed of four 3.6-megawatt (4,800 hp) MAN 6L32/44CR four-stroke medium-speed diesel generators and two electric propulsion motors rated at 4.5 megawatts (6,000 hp) driving two shafts. Margaret Brooke is capable of 17 knots (31 km/h; 20 mph) in open water and 3 knots (5.6 km/h; 3.5 mph) in 1-metre (3 ft 3 in) first-year sea ice. The ship is also equipped with a bow thruster to aid during manoeuvres and docking procedures without requiring tugboat assistance. The ship has a range of 6,800 nautical miles (12,600 km; 7,800 mi) and an endurance of 120 days. Margaret Brooke is equipped with fin stabilizers to decrease roll in open water but can be retracted during icebreaking.

Margaret Brooke is able to deploy with multiple payloads, including shipping containers, underwater survey equipment or landing craft. Payload operations are aided by a 20-metric-ton (20-long-ton; 22-short-ton) crane for loading and unloading. The ship is equipped with a vehicle bay which can hold pickup trucks, all-terrain vehicles and snowmobiles. The ship also has two 8.5-metre (27 ft 11 in) multi-role rescue boats capable of over 35 knots (65 km/h; 40 mph). The ship is armed with one BAE Mk 38 25 mm (0.98 in) gun and two M2 Browning machine guns. The patrol ship has an onboard hangar and flight deck for helicopters up to the size of a Sikorsky CH-148 Cyclone. Margaret Brooke has a complement of 65 and accommodation for 85 or 87.

== Service history ==
The order for the Arctic Offshore Patrol Ships was placed on 19 October 2011 with Irving Shipyards of Halifax, Nova Scotia, as part of the National Shipbuilding Procurement Strategy. The ship was constructed in 62 blocks, which were then pieced together into three larger blocks. These three "mega blocks" were fitted together to form the hull of the ship. On 13 April 2015 the government announced that after the first ship named Harry DeWolf, a second ship would be named Margaret Brooke. During World War II, Margaret Brooke, a navy nursing sister, was decorated for her actions during the sinking of the passenger ferry SS Caribou. The vessel's keel was laid down on 29 May 2017 and the vessel was launched on 10 November 2019. The ship began contractor sea trials in May 2021. The vessel was delivered to the Royal Canadian Navy for post-acceptance sea trials on 15 July 2021. The naming ceremony was held on 29 May 2022 in conjunction with that for sister ship Max Bernays.

The vessel, though not formally commissioned, was among the RCN ships deployed to the Arctic as part of the multinational military exercise Operation Nanook in August 2022. In September 2022, Margaret Brooke was tasked for hurricane relief efforts, after Hurricane Fiona's devastating impact to the Maritimes. The vessel provided assistance including damage assessment and welfare checks to the most impacted communities along the south coast of Newfoundland, where water access was the only means of entering the area. The vessel was commissioned on 28 October 2022.

In early 2024, Margaret Brooke was involved in a drug interdiction in the Caribbean Sea. In June, the ship was deployed to Havana Harbour where Russian vessels, including the submarine Kazan and the frigate Admiral Gorshkov, were also present. Minister of Defence Bill Blair said the ship was deployed as an act of deterrence directed at Russia.

On 11 January 2025 Margaret Brooke departed Halifax, as part of Operation Projection. The mission marks the first circumnavigation of South America and visit to Antarctica by a Royal Canadian Navy vessel.
