= HMCS Harry DeWolf =

Royal Canadian Navy offshore patrol vessel

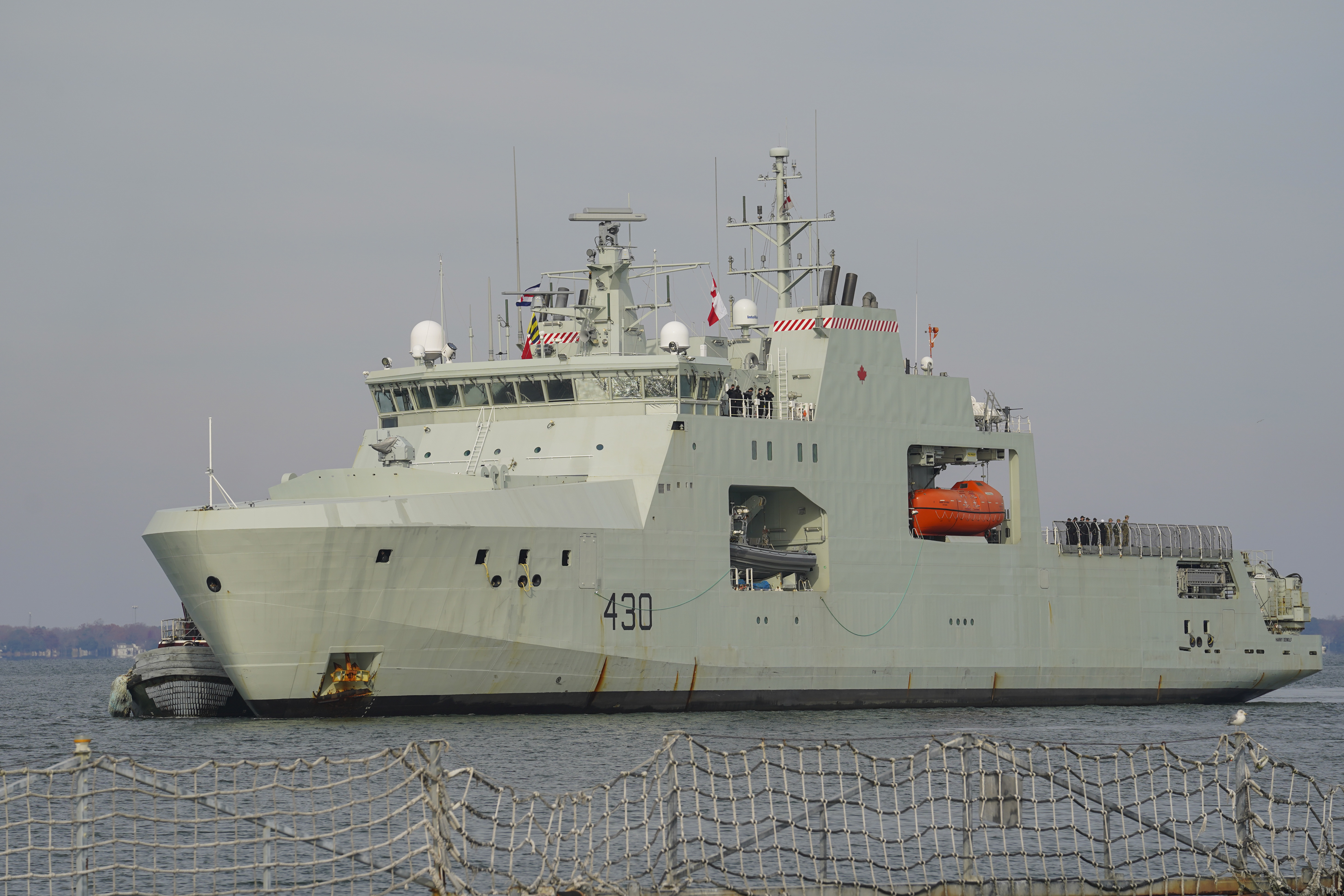
- HMCS Harry DeWolf pulls into Naval Station Norfolk, 2021

History

Canada
- Name: Harry DeWolf
- Namesake: Harry DeWolf
- Ordered: 19 October 2011
- Builder: Irving Shipbuilding, Halifax, Nova Scotia
- Laid down: 11 March 2016
- Launched: 15 September 2018
- Commissioned: 26 June 2021
- Home port: Halifax
- Identification: Hull number: AOPV 430; IMO number: 4702503; MMSI number: 316014510; Call sign: CGBT
- Motto: Vincit qui patitur (Latin for 'Whoever endures, conquers')
- Status: Ship in active service

General characteristics
- Type: Harry DeWolf-class offshore patrol vessel
- Displacement: 6,615 t (6,511 long tons)
- Length: 103.6 m (339 ft 11 in)
- Beam: 19.0 m (62 ft 4 in)
- Draught: 5.7 m (18 ft 8 in)
- Ice class: Polar Class 5
- Installed power: 4 × MAN 6L32/44CR (4 × 3.6 MW)
- Propulsion: Diesel-electric; Two shafts (2 × 4.5 MW); Bow thruster
- Speed: 17 kn (31 km/h; 20 mph) (open water); 3 kn (5.6 km/h; 3.5 mph) in 1 m (3 ft 3 in) ice
- Range: 6,800 nmi (12,600 km; 7,800 mi) at 14 kn (26 km/h; 16 mph)
- Endurance: 120 days
- Boats & landing craft carried: 2 × 8.5 m (28 ft) Rosborough Boats multi-role rescue boats; 12 m (39 ft) landing craft
- Armament: 1 × BAE Mk 38 25 mm (0.98 in) gun; 2 × M2 Browning machine gun
- Aircraft carried: Sikorsky CH-148 Cyclone or other helicopters/CU-176 Gargoyle UAV
- Aviation facilities: Hangar and flight deck

HMCS Harry DeWolf (AOPV 430) is the lead ship of her class of offshore patrol vessels for the Royal Canadian Navy (RCN). The class was derived from the Arctic Offshore Patrol Ship project as part of the National Shipbuilding Procurement Strategy and is primarily designed for the patrol and support of Canada's Arctic regions. Named after Vice Admiral Harry DeWolf, a former head of the RCN, the vessel was ordered in 2011, laid down in 2016 and launched in 2018. The vessel completed contractors sea trials in July 2020, was delivered to the RCN on 31 July 2020 and began post-acceptance sea trials. Harry DeWolf was commissioned on 26 June 2021.

== Design and description ==
The Harry DeWolf-class offshore patrol vessels are designed for use in the Arctic regions of Canada for patrol and support within Canada's exclusive economic zone. The vessel is 103.6 m (339 ft 11 in) long overall with a beam of 19.0 m (62 ft 4 in). The ship has a displacement of 6,615 metric tons (6,511 long tons). The ship has an enclosed foredeck that protects machinery and work spaces from Arctic climates. The vessel is powered by a diesel-electric system composed of four 3.6-megawatt (4,800 hp) MAN 6L32/44CR four-stroke medium-speed diesel generators and two electric propulsion motors rated at 4.5 megawatts (6,000 hp) driving two shafts. Harry DeWolf is capable of 17 knots (31 km/h; 20 mph) in open water and 3 knots (5.6 km/h; 3.5 mph) in 1-metre (3 ft 3 in) first-year sea ice. The ship is also equipped with a bow thruster to aid during manoeuvres and docking procedures without requiring tugboat assistance. The ship has an operational range of at least 6,800 nautical miles (12,600 km; 7,800 mi) at 14 knots (26 km/h; 16 mph) in open water and an endurance of 120 days. Harry DeWolf is equipped with fin stabilizers to decrease roll in open water but can be retracted during icebreaking.

Harry DeWolf is able to deploy with multiple payloads, including shipping containers, underwater survey equipment or landing craft. Payload operations are aided by a 20-metric-ton (20-long-ton; 22-short-ton) crane for loading and unloading. The ship is equipped with a vehicle bay which can hold pickup trucks, all-terrain vehicles and snowmobiles. The ship also has two 8.5-metre (27 ft 11 in) multi-role rescue boats capable of over 35 knots (65 km/h; 40 mph). The ship is armed with one BAE Mk 38 25 mm (0.98 in) gun and two M2 Browning machine guns. The patrol ship has an onboard hangar and flight deck for helicopters up to the size of a Sikorsky CH-148 Cyclone. Harry DeWolf has a complement of 65 and accommodation for 85 or 87.

== Construction ==
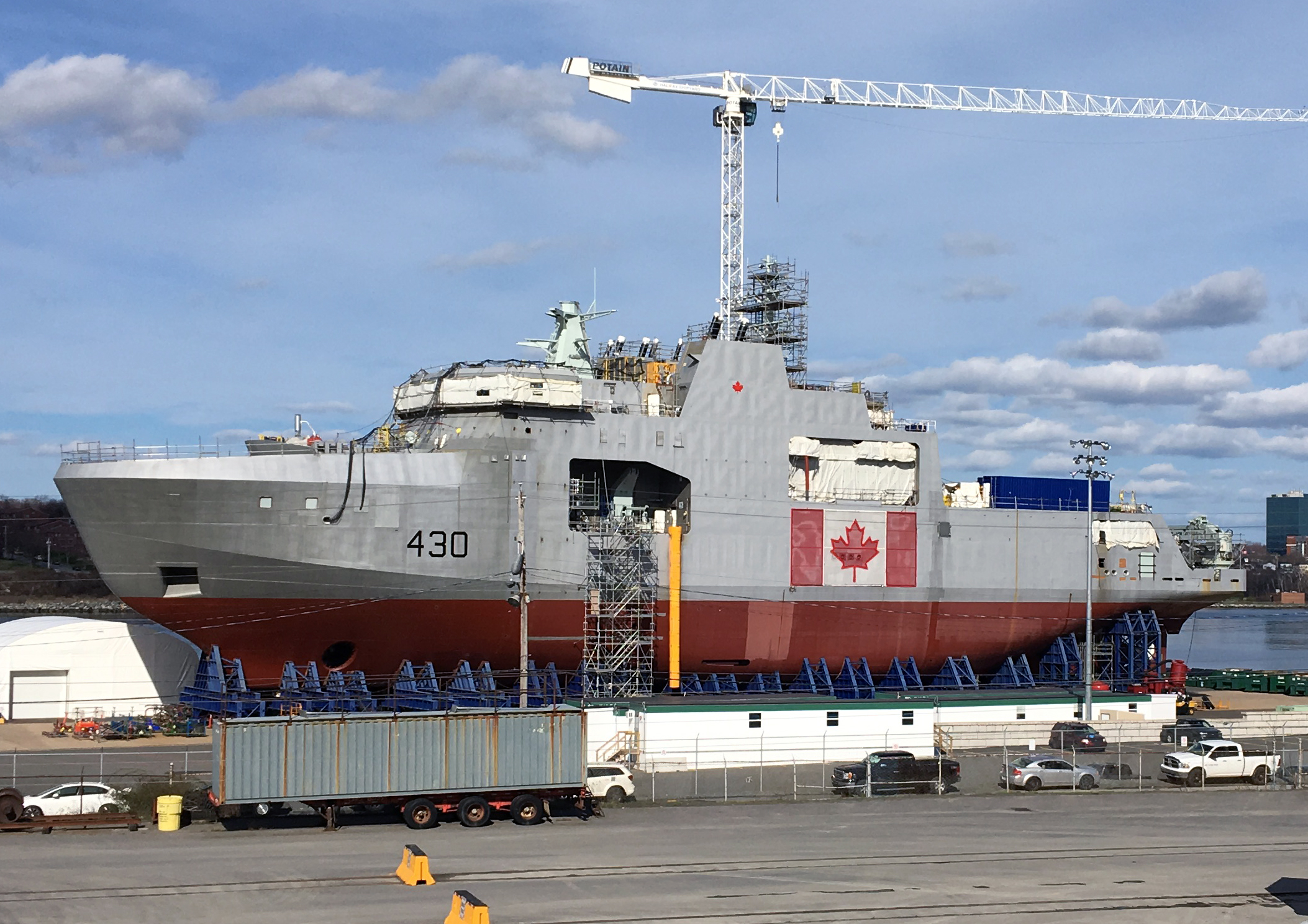
Harry DeWolf under construction in May 2018

The order for the Arctic Offshore Patrol Ships was placed on 19 October 2011 with Irving Shipyards of Halifax, Nova Scotia, as part of the National Shipbuilding Procurement Strategy. The ship was to be constructed in 62 blocks, which would then be pieced together into three larger blocks. These three "mega blocks" would be fitted together to form the hull of the ship. On 18 September 2014, it was announced that the first ship of the class was to be named Harry DeWolf in honour of Rear Admiral Harry DeWolf, a decorated naval officer who served during World War II in European waters and as the Royal Canadian Navy Chief of the Naval Staff during the early Cold War. The ship was given the hull number AOPV 430. On 18 June 2015 it was reported that the construction of test modules for Harry DeWolf was underway. The first sections of keel were placed on 11 March 2016, but the official laying of the keel of Harry DeWolf was held on 9 June 2016, marking the first naval construction in Canada since 1998. On 8 December 2017, the three main sections of Harry DeWolf were fitted into place.

Harry DeWolf was launched on 15 September 2018. The vessel was loaded onto the semi-submersible barge Boa Barge 37 and taken out into Halifax Harbour. There, the barge was submerged and the ship floated free, to be towed back to the shipyard. The vessel was officially named at Halifax on 5 October 2018 by sponsor Sophie Grégoire Trudeau, the wife of Prime Minister Justin Trudeau. Harry DeWolf began builders sea trials on 22 November 2019. The ship was delivered to the Royal Canadian Navy on 31 July 2020 and began post-acceptance sea trials. The ship was commissioned on 26 June 2021.

== Service history ==
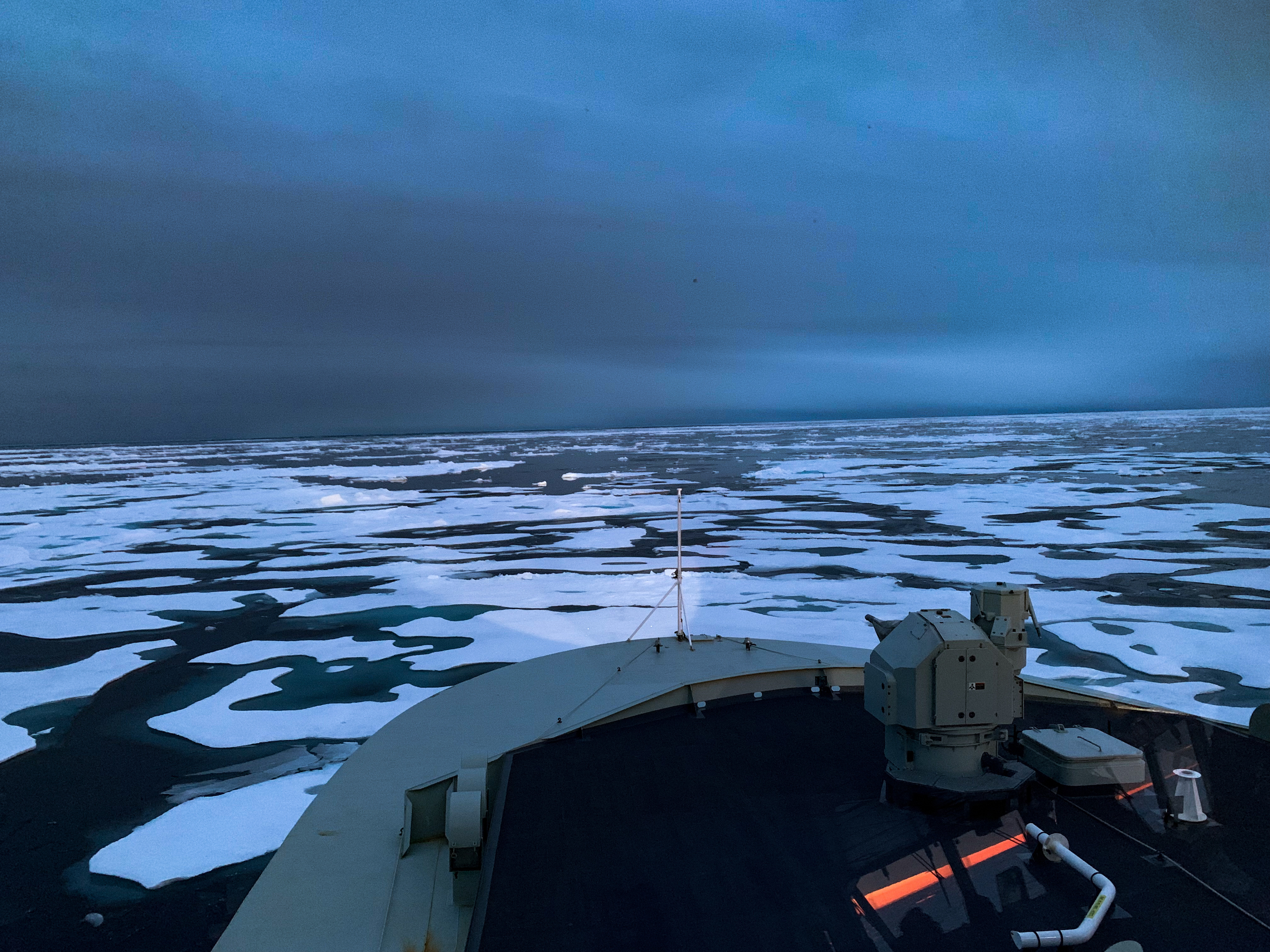
Harry DeWolf transiting the Northwest Passage on her maiden voyage

Harry DeWolf embarked on her inaugural deployment on 3 August 2021. She participated in Operation Nanook, Canada's annual sovereignty operation and manoeuvre warfare exercise conducted in the Arctic, alongside HMCS Goose Bay and elements of the Canadian Coast Guard and the United States Coast Guard. During this exercise, a new underwater listening device called the Towed Reelable Active-Passive Sonar (TRAPS) was trialled, testing advanced acoustic sensing capabilities for anti-submarine warfare operations. The ship then proceeded through the Northwest Passage, and docked at CFB Esquimalt on 4 October 2021. Harry DeWolf left CFB Esquimalt on 22 October 2021, and sailed to the Caribbean Sea and Atlantic Ocean via the Panama Canal. During this second leg of her journey, she took part in Operation Caribbe — Canada's contribution to the US-led anti-drug smuggling effort Operation Martillo — and seized almost 3,000 kilograms (6,600 lb) of cocaine. Harry DeWolf returned to CFB Halifax on 16 December 2021, becoming the first Canadian naval vessel to circumnavigate North America since HMCS Labrador made a similar voyage in 1954.

In August 2022, Harry DeWolf was among the Canadian warships that were to be deployed to the Arctic as part of the multinational military exercise Operation Nanook. However, after two of four generators on the ship ceased functioning, the ship's participation in the exercise was cancelled due to a need to return to Halifax for repairs. The ship was not expected to return to service until April 2023.

In August 2023, after an operational hiatus for necessary repairs and extensive sailor training, Harry DeWolf departed from her homeport of Halifax for the 2023 iteration of the annual sovereignty Arctic deployment, Operation Nanook.
