= William Hall (VC) =

Canadian Royal Navy hero

William Nelson Edward Hall
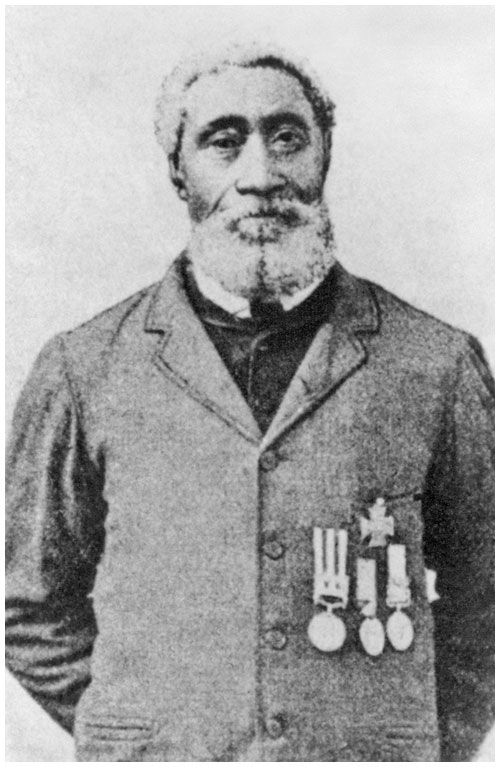
- Born: 28 April 1827; Horton, Colony of Nova Scotia
- Died: 27 August 1904 (aged 77); Avonport, Nova Scotia, Canada
- Burial place: Hantsport Baptist Church Cemetery, Nova Scotia
- Military career
- Allegiance: United States (1847–49); United Kingdom (1849–76)
- Branch: United States Navy; Royal Navy
- Service years: 1847–1876
- Rank: Quartermaster
- Conflicts: Mexican–American War Crimean War: Battle of Inkerman; Siege of Sevastopol; Indian Rebellion: Siege of Lucknow
- Awards: Victoria Cross

William Nelson Hall (Note: Hall's middle name is sometimes given as "Edward" but Parks Canada historian David States located his baptismal certificate which records his middle name as "Nelson", sometimes misspelled as Nielson.) VC (28 April 1827 – 27 August 1904) was the first Black person, first Nova Scotian, and the third Canadian to receive the Victoria Cross due to his actions in the 1857 Siege of Lucknow amid the Indian Rebellion. In the face of heavy enemy fire, Hall and an officer from his ship continued to load and fire a 24-pounder gun at the walls of the Shah Nujeef mosque, a prominent stronghold of the Sepoy defence. Hall's actions were integral to the breaking of the siege and subsequent British evacuation.

== Early life ==
William Neilson Hall was born at Horton, Nova Scotia, in 1827 (Note: Hall's date of birth is sometimes given as 1829 or 1826 but based on his birth certificate and military records, the Nova Scotia Museum concluded he was born in 1827.) as the son of Jacob and Lucy Hall, who had escaped American slave owners in Maryland during the War of 1812 and were brought to freedom in Nova Scotia by the British Royal Navy as part of the Black Refugee movement. The Halls first lived in Summerville, Nova Scotia, where Jacob worked in a shipyard operated by Abraham Cunard until they bought a farm across the Avon River at Horton Bluff. Hall first worked in shipyards at nearby Hantsport, Nova Scotia, before going to sea at the age of seventeen. He sailed first on merchant ships based out of the Minas Basin including the barque Kent of Kentville, Nova Scotia.

== Naval career ==
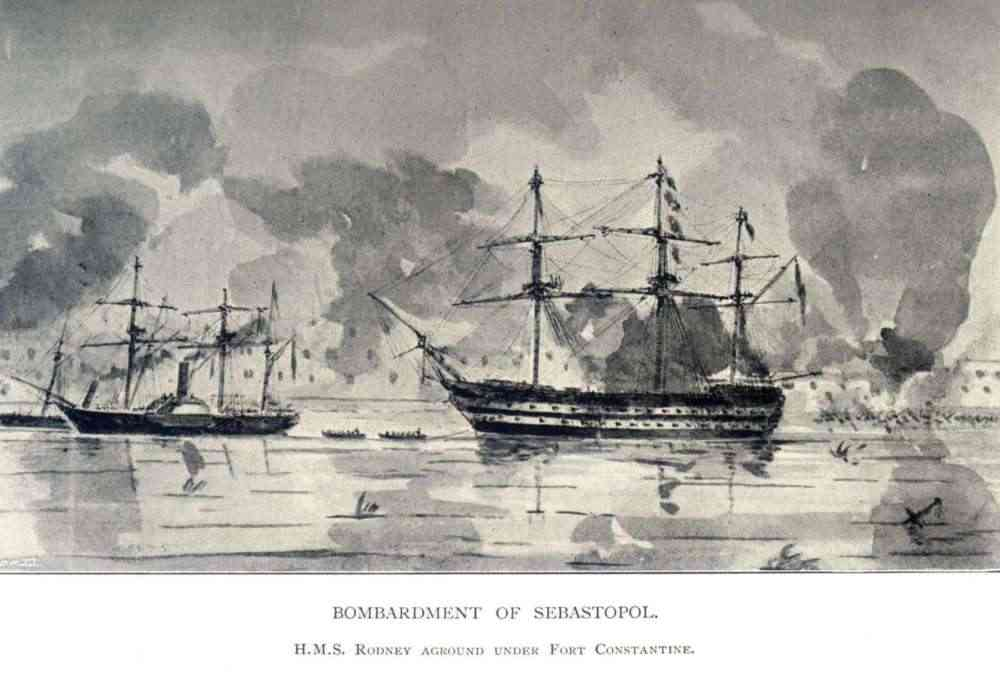
Bombardment of Sebastopol by HMS Rodney, Crimean War (1854)

Hall briefly served in the United States Navy from 1847 to 1849, during the Mexican–American War. He served for a time aboard USS Ohio alongside John Taylor Wood, who later supported Hall's US Navy pension claim.

Hall volunteered for the Royal Navy in February 1852, serving at first aboard HMS Rodney. Hall fought in the Crimean War serving ashore in a Naval Brigade from Rodney. Hall served throughout the Siege of Sevastopol from 1854 to 1855, manning the Right Lancaster Battery, and took part in the Battle of Inkerman. After a brief tour on HMS Victory, Hall transferred to the frigate HMS Shannon, where he became captain of the foretop.

When the Indian Rebellion broke out in May 1857, Shannon was among the fleet escorting a troop detachment to China. Upon arrival at Singapore, news of the situation in India reached the fleet, however the fleet completed its mission, arriving at Hong Kong. There, Shannon was ordered to Calcutta (since renamed Kolkata). A brigade from Shannon, comprising 450 men, was constituted under Captain William Peel. The ship was towed over 600 miles (970 km) up the Ganges River to Allahabad. Then the force fought across country to Campbell's headquarters at Cawnpore and were in time to take part in the Siege of Lucknow.

=== Relief of Lucknow ===
On 16 November 1857 at Lucknow, India, naval guns were brought up close to the Shah Nujeef mosque, one of the key locations in the siege. One of the gun crews was short a man and Hall volunteered to fill out the position. The gun crews kept up a steady fire in an attempt to breach and clear the walls, while a hail of musket balls and grenades from the opposing fighters inside the mosque caused heavy casualties. After having little effect on the walls, two guns were ordered closer. Of the crews, only Able Seaman Hall and Lieutenant Thomas James Young, the battery's commander, were able to continue fighting, all the rest having been killed or wounded, and between them they loaded and served the last gun, which was fired at less than 20 yards (18 m) from the wall, until it was breached. The joint citation in the London Gazette reads:

Lieutenant (now Commander) Young, late Gunnery Officer of Her Majesty's ship " Shannon," and William Hall, "Captain of the Foretop," of that Vessel, were recommended by the late Captain Peel for the Victoria Cross, for their gallant conduct at a 24-Pounder Gun, brought up to the angle of the Shah Nujjiff, at Lucknow, on 16 November 1857.

=== Later career ===
Hall remained with the Royal Navy for the rest of his career. He joined the crew of HMS Donegal in 1859. On 28 October 1859, he was presented with the Victoria Cross by Rear Admiral Charles Talbot while Donegal was anchored at Queenstown Harbour. Hall rose to the rating of Petty Officer First Class in HMS Royal Adelaide by the time he retired in 1876. He returned to his home village in Horton Bluff where he ran a small farm until his death in 1904. In 1901, the future King George V, visiting Nova Scotia, saw Hall at a parade, recognized his medals, and spoke with him.

== Commemorations ==
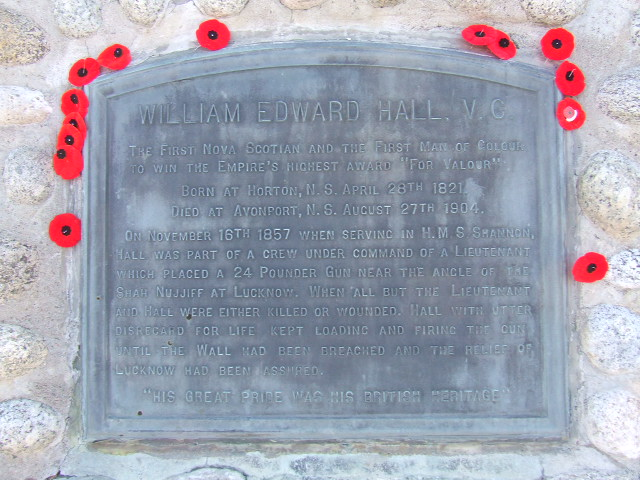
Plaque on Hall monument in Hantsport

He was originally buried in an unmarked grave without military honours. He was reinterred in 1954 in Hantsport, Nova Scotia where his grave is marked by a monument at the Baptist church. The Royal Canadian Legion (now closed) in Hantsport was named "The Lucknow Branch" in honour of his Victoria Cross action.

Hall's original Victoria Cross was repatriated from Britain in 1967 by the government of Nova Scotia and is on permanent display at the Maritime Museum of the Atlantic in Halifax.

Hall is also featured in exhibits at the Halifax Citadel and at the Black Cultural Centre for Nova Scotia. Canada Post commemorated William Hall on a stamp, first issued on 1 February 2010 in Hantsport, Nova Scotia and officially launched at the Black Cultural Centre on 2 February 2010. Hall was designated a National Historic Person by the Canadian Historic Sites and Monuments Board at Hantsport on 8 October 2010 and a new plaque was unveiled in his honour.

In November 2010, a connector road in Hantsport was named the William Hall V.C. Memorial Highway. A sign, bearing Hall's likeness, was erected on the road from Highway 101 to Trunk 1 near Hantsport.

The fourth ship in the Royal Canadian Navy's Harry DeWolf class was officially named HMCS William Hall in a ceremony at Irving Shipbuilding's yard in Halifax on 28 April 2023.

== Further Information ==
Hall is commemorated in the Ministry of Defence publication "We were there". Its subject is the contribution of ethnic minorities to Britain in times of war. Hall is one of four Victoria Cross winners featured in the brochure: Gian Singh, Abdul Hafiz and Kamal Ram are the others

== Awards and decorations ==
Hall's personal awards and decorations include the following:

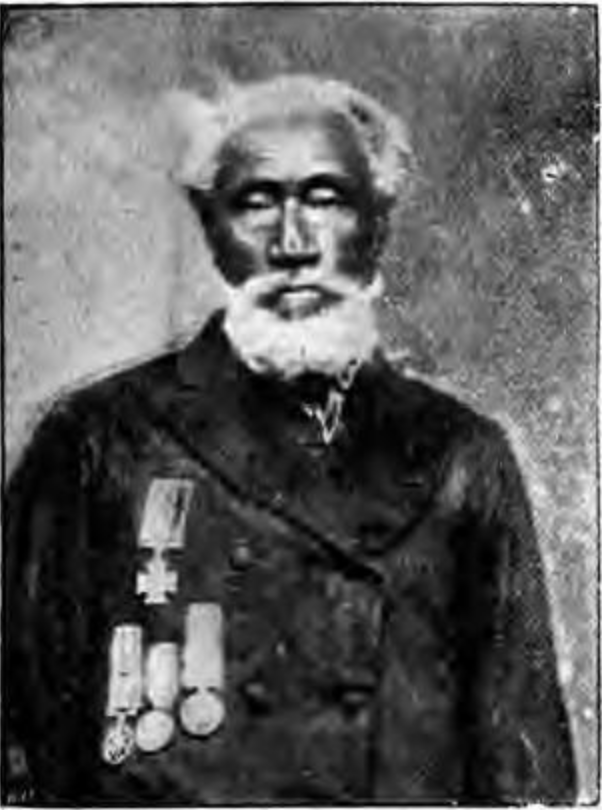
William Hall, VC, Siege of Lucknow, portrait by Frank Briggs (1824–1888), 15 High Street, St. John's Wood, London

Ribbon	Description	Notes
	Victoria Cross (VC)	Awarded as per London Gazette of 2 January 1859; Presented 28 October 1859 aboard HMS Donegal in Queenstown Harbour, Ireland.
	Crimea Medal	With Balaklava clasp; With Inkerman clasp; With Sebastopol clasp
	Turkish Crimea Medal	1856
	Indian Mutiny Medal	With Relief of Lucknow clasp; With Lucknow clasp

== See also ==
- Nova Scotia Heritage Day

== Bibliography ==
- States, David W. (1996). Hall VC of Horton Nineteenth Century Naval Hero. Vol. 44. Royal Nova Scotia Historical Society.
