= Max Bernays =

Canadian Navy officer (1910–1974)

- Born: January 3, 1910 Vancouver, British Columbia
- Died: March 30, 1974 (aged 64)
- Allegiance: Canada
- Branch: Royal Canadian Navy
- Rank: Acting Chief Petty Officer
- Conflicts: World War II: Battle of the Atlantic
- Awards: Conspicuous Gallantry Medal 1939-1945 Star Atlantic Star with France Germany Bar Canadian Volunteer Service Medal War Medal 1939-1945 United Nations Korea Medal Naval Long Service and Good Conduct Medal Canadian Forces' Decoration

Max Bernays CGM CD (January 3, 1910 – March 30, 1974) was a Royal Canadian Naval Reserve Acting Chief Petty Officer who fought in the Battle of the Atlantic during the Second World War. He was awarded the Conspicuous Gallantry Medal for his actions aboard HMCS Assiniboine on August 6, 1942.

== Early life ==
Bernays was born in 1910 in Vancouver, British Columbia. He had served in the Royal Canadian Navy Volunteer Reserve (RCNVR) in 1929 and served with Canadian National Steamships in the 1930s.

== Wartime service ==
Bernays was recalled by the Royal Canadian Navy at the outbreak of the Second World War. By March 1942 Bernays had achieved the rank of Acting Chief Petty Officer and was the Coxswain aboard HMCS Assiniboine, a River-class destroyer.

=== Actions aboard HMCS Assiniboine ===
On August 6, 1942, the Assiniboine engaged the German U-boat U-210. A fierce gun-battle ensued, causing a major fire aboard the Assiniboine. Lieutenant-Commander John H. Stubbs, commander of the Assiniboine, maneuvered the vessel to ram the U-boat. Bernays ordered his telegraph operators who were giving orders to the engine room to leave, as the fire began to surround the wheelhouse. Bernays manned the helm and did the work of the two telegraph operators while Stubbs gave orders to ram U-210. As the gun battle grew in intensity, Assiniboine rammed U-210 abaft of her conning tower, crippling the submarine. 38 of the 48 German crew were rescued. Assiniboine's losses were minimal, with one killed and 13 wounded.

=== Recognition of service ===
Bernays was awarded the Conspicuous Gallantry Medal for his heroic actions. His actions displayed such a degree of courage that a prominent flag officer in the RCN recommended him for the Victoria Cross. Rear Admiral L.W. Murray believed that "the manner in which this comparatively young rating remained at his post, alone, and carried out the 133 telegraph orders as well as the many helm orders necessary to accomplish the destruction of this submarine, whilst the wheelhouse was being pierced by explosive shell from the enemy's Oerlikon gun and his only exit was cut off by fire, is not only in keeping with the highest traditions of the Service but adds considerably to those traditions. I am proud of the privilege to recommend Acting Chief Petty Officer Bernays for the Victoria Cross." Bernays did not receive the Victoria Cross due to conflicts with the British Admiralty, which was hesitant upon receiving the recommendation despite a push from Canadian authorities. This was one of the first cases where the Canadian Government had intervened in the process, but like many other cases after it, the attempt failed.

== Post-war ==
At the close of the Second World War, Bernays remained in the RCN and later served in the Korean War. His medals can be seen on display at the CFB Esquimalt Museum.

A Harry DeWolf-class offshore patrol vessel is named HMCS Max Bernays. The vessel was commissioned on 3 May 2024 in the presence of Anne, Princess Royal.
