= National Shipbuilding Strategy =

Canadian governmental procurement program

The National Shipbuilding Strategy (NSS), formerly the National Shipbuilding Procurement Strategy (NSPS), is a Government of Canada program operated by the Department of Public Works and Government Services. The NSS was developed under the Stephen Harper Government in an effort to renew the fleets of the Royal Canadian Navy (RCN) and the Canadian Coast Guard (CCG). The strategy was broken into three sections; the combat package, the non-combat package and the smaller vessel package. The companies who won the bids for the larger ships were not permitted to bid on the smaller vessel package. In 2019, the Trudeau Government decided to add a third shipyard to the NSS specializing in the construction of icebreakers for the Coast Guard. The agreement to incorporate Davie as a third shipyard within the NSS was finally signed in April 2023.

The NSS was launched on 3 June 2010 and the results for the two larger packages were made public on 19 October 2011. Contracts for smaller vessels under the NSS were announced as they were awarded.

== Work packages ==
The NSS program was charged with selecting Canadian shipyards capable of rebuilding the fleets of the RCN and the CCG through two large packages of work (a combat ship package and a non-combat ship package), originally valued at about $38 billion but with that level of envisaged spending now in excess of $100 billion. Another package of work for smaller vessels was separate but part of the overall strategy.

Rising project costs have impacted every program within the strategy with the budget for the Arctic Offshore Patrol Ships having increased by more than $1.6 billion, that of the River-class destroyers by more than $50 billion, the Joint Support Ships by $1.5 billion, the Polar icebreaker by $6.5 billion (in part due to the expansion of this acquisition from one to two ships), the Offshore Oceanographic Science Vessel by more than $1 billion, and the Offshore Fisheries Science Vessels by more than $400 million.

=== Combat Package ===
The Combat Package awarded to Irving Shipbuilding, originally circa $30 billion and subsequently increased to over $80 billion, consists of 21 combatant vessels (warships) for the RCN and two non-combatant vessels for the CCG.

- Royal Canadian Navy
  - 6 Harry DeWolf-class offshore patrol vessels under the Arctic and Offshore Patrol Ship (AOPS) project; first five ships (Harry DeWolf, Margaret Brooke, Max Bernays, William Hall and Frédérick Rolette) in service and sixth (Robert Hampton Gray) delivered as of May 2026
  - 15 River-class destroyers under the Canadian Surface Combatant (CSC) project; lead ship (HMCS Fraser) under construction as of May 2026
- Canadian Coast Guard
  - 2 unarmed variants of the Harry DeWolf-class offshore patrol vessels; first ship (Donjek) launched and second (Sermilik) under construction as of May 2026

=== Non-Combat Package ===
The circa $26 billion Non-Combat Package for seven vessels was initially awarded solely to Seaspan Shipbuilding. It was later expanded to include Davie Shipbuilding and cover up to 30 vessels: up to 23 built by Seaspan and seven by Davie.

- Royal Canadian Navy
  - 2 Protecteur-class auxiliary vessels to be built by Seaspan under the Joint Support Ship (JSS) project; first ship (Protecteur) launched and second (Preserver) under construction as of May 2026
- Canadian Coast Guard
  - 3 vessels built by Seaspan under the Offshore Fisheries Science Vessel (OFSV) project; all ships (Sir John Franklin, Capt. Jacques Cartier and John Cabot) in service
  - 1 vessel built by Seaspan under the Offshore Oceanographic Science Vessel (OOSV) project; Naalak Nappaaluk in service
  - 2 polar icebreakers, one to be built by Seaspan and the other by Davie, under the Polar Icebreaker Project; both ships (Arpatuuq and Imnaryuaq) under construction as of May 2026
  - up to 16 icebreakers to be built by Seaspan under the Multi-Purpose Icebreaker (MPI) (Note: Previously referred to as Multi-Purpose Vessels (MPV)) project
  - 6 medium icebreakers to be built by Davie under the Program Icebreaker (PIB) project

== Project history ==
=== Proponents ===
The Department of Public Works and Government Services issued a "Solicitation of Interest and Qualification" on 20 September 2010 and closed it on 8 October 2010. Five Canadian shipyards were short-listed to build the large vessels:

- Kiewit Offshore Services (major yard in Marystown, Newfoundland and Labrador)
- Irving Shipbuilding (major yard in Halifax, Nova Scotia)
- Davie Yards Incorporated (major yard in Lévis, Quebec)
- Washington Marine Group (major yard in Vancouver, British Columbia)
- Seaway Marine and Industrial (major yard in St. Catharines, Ontario)

Between October 2010 and January 2011, the short-listed shipyards were consulted on the content of the "Request for Proposals" (RFP), the umbrella agreements, the proposed schedule, and the evaluation methodology.

The RFP was released on 7 February 2011, and closed on 21 July 2011. Five proposals were received from three bidders:

- Irving Shipbuilding Inc.
- Seaspan Marine Corp. (renamed from Washington Marine Group in 2011)
- Davie Yards Inc.

Two of the proposals received were for the combat work package and three were for the non-combat work package.

=== Evaluation ===
An evaluation organization composed of Canadian Forces and Canadian Coast Guard personnel, as well as public servants from the departments involved (Public Works and Government Services Canada, Industry Canada, National Defence, and Fisheries and Oceans Canada) evaluated the proposals. An independent fairness monitor oversaw the process. The shipyards were evaluated on a combination of mandatory and rated requirements.

During the final evaluation period, one of the proponents, Davie Yards, underwent a corporate restructuring which was accepted by the NSS governance on 27 July 2011. Davie Yards Inc. was changed to 7731299 Canada Incorporated which was a consortium between Davie Yards Incorporated, Seaway Marine and Industrial and Daewoo Shipbuilding & Marine Engineering.

=== Result ===
On 19 October 2011 the Government of Canada selected Irving Shipbuilding Inc. for the $25 billion combat work package and Seaspan Marine Corp. for the $8 billion non-combat work package. In 2012, the two companies negotiated the contracts for the first projects of each package.

On 16 January 2015, the Government of Canada finalized the contract for the construction of the Arctic Patrol Ship Project. Initially slated to cost $3.1 billion to build eight ships, the budget was increased to $3.5 billion for five ships, possibly six if no cost overruns on the first five. Construction started on the first ship in September 2015.

The search for the two main subcontractors on Irving's Surface Combatant package began in June 2015. In 2017, the Government of Canada will make its choice for two main subcontractors; one for combat systems integration (gun, missile, radar, sonar, communications) and the other for the design of the ship. The list of those pre-qualified candidates which applied for the Surface Combatant subcontractor positions was released on 18 November 2015.

In September 2015, reports emerged that climbing costs would lead to a reduction in the number of Surface Combatants the Canadian government would receive. Problems were reported to have emerged from the Seaspan-apportioned part of the contract. In order to get the contract, Seaspan's yard had to be upgraded, which was only completed in November 2014. According to the agreement signed in 2012, the yard was to be ready to build by January 2015, but missed that date. Construction only started on the first Coast Guard ships in June 2015, leading to fears that the Joint Support Ships could be delayed.

In November 2015, reports of climbing costs associated with the NSS, reportedly up to 181%, has led to possible cancellations within the program. The newly elected Canadian government is set to review the entire program, after senior officials reported that the funding estimates outlined in the original plan were too low to meet operational requirements. However, the new government also simultaneously committed itself to retaining the NSS.

The first vessel constructed under the NSS, CCGS Sir John Franklin, was launched at Seaspan's shipyard in North Vancouver on 8 December 2017. On 5 February 2019, the Canadian government changed the build order of ships at the Seaspan yard, placing the construction of one of the planned naval replenishment ships ahead of the Coast Guard's oceanographic science vessel. The second supply vessel will still be constructed after the oceanographic science vessel is completed. In February 2021, a contract for the construction of Offshore Oceanographic Science Vessel was finally awarded. However, the total costs were reported to be nearly $1 billion, a figure attracting considerable criticism.

On 8 February 2019, Canada signed an agreement with Lockheed Martin Canada, BAE Systems, Inc. and Irving Shipbuilding to design and construct the $60 billion Canadian Surface Combatant (River-class destroyer) project.

=== Addition of a third shipyard ===
In 2019, the Government of Canada decided to initiate a competition to add a third yard to the NSS. Widely rumored to end up being Davie Yards of Quebec, the yard appeared likely to specialize in medium, and possibly Polar, icebreakers for the Coast Guard.

In December 2019 it was announced that only Davie Yards had qualified for the icebreaker work. The next step was to negotiate an umbrella agreement between the federal government and Davie Yards by the end of 2020. The umbrella agreement would formally add Davie as a third yard under the NSS. However, by the end of 2020 no progress had yet been reported.

In May 2021, the Government announced that the conclusion of the envisaged umbrella agreement was now "expected to be in place in late 2021". It was also announced that, pending the conclusion of that agreement, Davie would build one polar icebreaker for the Coast Guard while the Seaspan yard would build another one. As of the end of 2021, further progress on the conclusion of the umbrella agreement had not yet been reported.

In June 2022 the Government again indicated that negotiations had been initiated to conclude an agreement by the end of the year. However, as of early January 2023 and consistent with the pattern of previous years, no further progress had been reported. The agreement to incorporate Davie as a third shipyard within the NSS was finally signed in April 2023.

== See also ==
- Amphibious Assault Ship Project
- Canada-class submarine, a 1987 proposal for a class of nuclear-powered attack submarines that was cancelled in 1989
- General Purpose Frigate, a failed Canadian procurement project of the 1960s
- Polar 8 Project
