= Margaret Brooke (Canadian naval officer) =

Nursing Sister of the Royal Canadian Navy

Lieutenant-Commander Margaret Brooke MBE
- Born: April 10, 1915; Ardath, Saskatchewan, Canada
- Died: January 9, 2016 (aged 100); Victoria, British Columbia, Canada
- Education: University of Saskatchewan
- Occupation(s): Scientist and naval officer

Margaret Brooke MBE (April 10, 1915 – January 9, 2016), served as a nursing sister during the Second World War rising to the rank of lieutenant commander in the Royal Canadian Navy (RCN). Following the war, she earned a bachelor's degree and then a PhD in paleontology, serving as an instructor and researcher at the University of Saskatchewan's Department of Geological Sciences.

== Biography ==
=== Early life and naval service ===
Margaret Brooke was born in Ardath, Saskatchewan, and at the age of 18 enrolled at the University of Saskatchewan where she earned a BHSC degree in household science in 1935. She volunteered for the RCN in March 1942 as a nursing sister dietician and was commissioned to the rank of sub-lieutenant. Nursing sisters were trained civilian nurses who fulfilled the Canadian military's need for nurses. The RCN created their own nursing force in 1941. Brooke was enrolled at HMCS Unicorn in Saskatoon, Saskatchewan, and served in several naval hospitals across the country.

Brooke was stationed in St. John's, Newfoundland, and was taking the ferry SS Caribou "that regularly crossed Cabot Strait from Sydney, Nova Scotia, to Port aux Basques, Newfoundland" on October 14, 1942. While off the coast of Newfoundland, the ship was torpedoed by the German submarine U-69 and sank in minutes. While fighting for her own survival, she attempted to save the life of her friend, Nursing Sister Sub-Lieutenant Agnes Wilkie, both of them clinging to ropes attached to a capsized lifeboat. Despite Brooke's efforts, Wilkie succumbed to the elements. Brooke and the other survivors of Caribou were in the water for two hours before HMCS Grandmère returned to pick them up. Wilkie was the only nursing sister to die from enemy action during the war. For her actions during the sinking of Caribou, Brooke was named as a Member of the Order of the British Empire on January 1, 1943. Following the war, she continued to serve in the RCN rising to the rank of lieutenant commander prior to her retirement in 1962.

=== Post naval career ===
After her service in the RCN, she earned a bachelor's degree and PhD in biostratigraphy and micro-paleontology. She served as an instructor and research associate in the University of Saskatchewan's Department of Geological Sciences until retiring in 1986. Brooke moved to Victoria, British Columbia, following her retirement. During her time at the university, she co-authored several influential geological papers.

In April 2015, the Minister of National Defence Jason Kenney announced that one of the RCN's new Arctic Offshore Patrol Ships would be named for Dr. Brooke. She responded that she was "amazed that my actions as a survivor of the sinking of the SS Caribou led the Royal Canadian Navy to my door."

Brooke died on January 9, 2016, in Victoria at the age of 100.

== Legacy ==
Brooke was named an "Alumna of Influence" by the College of Arts and Science of the University of Saskatchewan in 2018. The second Arctic Offshore Patrol Ship of the RCN, Margaret Brooke, which was launched in 2019 and entered service in 2022, is named in her honour.
