= Everllence =

German company

Everllence SE
- Formerly: MAN Diesel & Turbo SE; MAN Energy Solutions SE
- Type: Subsidiary (Societas Europaea)
- Industry: Manufacturing, automotive industry, marine engineering
- Predecessor: MAN Diesel and MAN Turbo
- Founded: 2010; 16 years ago
- Headquarters: Augsburg, Bavaria, Germany
- Key people: Uwe Lauber
- Products: reactors, compressors, diesel and other engines, turbomachinery
- Revenue: 4.3 billion EUR (2024)
- Number of employees: 15,000 (2024)
- Parent: Volkswagen Group
- Website: www.everllence.com

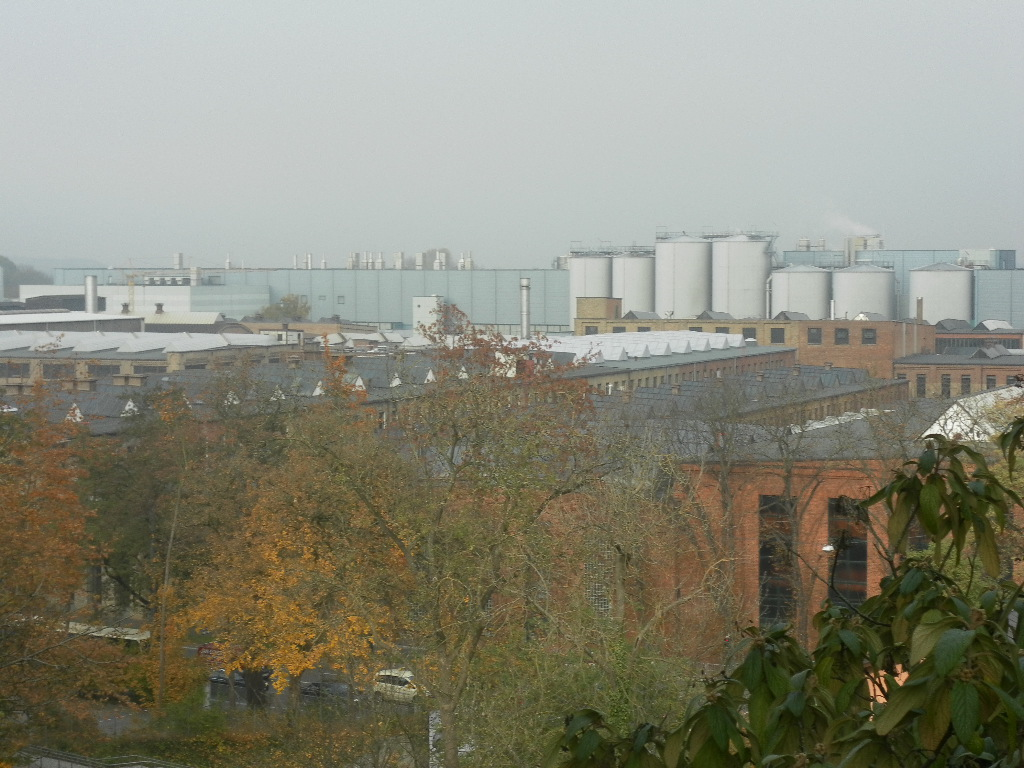
Die MAN Energy Solutions view from Lueginslandbastion

Everllence SE (Societas Europaea), previously known as MAN Energy Solutions SE is German manufacturer of large diesel engines and turbomachinery for maritime and stationary applications headquartered in Augsburg. The company develops and manufactures two-stroke and four-stroke diesel engines, as well as gas turbines, steam turbines, and compressors. Everllence also offers turbochargers, propellers, gas engines, and chemical reactors. Additionally, it produces ship engines that run on synthetic fuels and develops technologies for carbon capture and storage (CCS), large heat pumps, and electrolysers. The company employs around 15,000 people at more than 140 international locations, particularly in Germany, Denmark, France, Switzerland, the Czech Republic, India, and China.

MAN Energy Solutions previously was a company in the Power Engineering business sector of MAN SE, which had been a subsidiary of Volkswagen AG from 2011. Prior to the merger of MAN SE into Traton, MAN Energy Solutions was sold to its parent company, Volkswagen.

MAN Energy Solutions was renamed Everllence on 4 June 2025.

== History ==
=== Background ===
MAN originated from three German predecessor companies, the St. Antony ironworks in Oberhausen, Sander'sche Maschinenfabrik. St. Antony and Eisengießerei Klett & Comp. St. Antony was founded in 1758 and became Gutehoffnungshütte (GHH) in 1873, after several changes in ownership and restructuring. Sander'sche Maschinenfabrik was established in Augsburg in 1840, also underwent multiple mergers and transformations, and was merged with Maschinenbau-Actien-Gesellschaft Nürnberg (formerly Eisengießerei Klett & Comp.) in 1908 to become Maschinenfabrik Augsburg-Nürnberg (MAN).

Between 1893 and 1897, MAN, in collaboration with Rudolf Diesel, developed the first diesel engine, a single-cylinder four-stroke engine, which achieved a specific consumption of 324 g/kWh and produced 17.8 hp (13.1 kW) at 154 rpm. In 1899, following several experiments on the four-stroke engine by Hugo Güldner, the first two-stroke diesel engine was built. After the turn of the century, MAN developed the first diesel engine with an opposed-piston engine design.

MAN built the first diesel power plant in Kyiv in 1905. In 1910, MAN, in collaboration with the shipyard Blohm+Voss, began building upright two-stroke marine engines. Two years later, the ocean-going vessel MS Selandia became the first to be powered by diesel engines.

In 1921, Gutehoffnungshütte acquired a majority stake in MAN, creating a conglomerate that encompassed traditional ironworks, modern mechanical engineering, and the production of various commercial vehicles. The conglomerate operated under the abbreviation GHH. From 1926, MAN began designing high-performance two-stroke engines for marine use.

During World War II, several thousand prisoners of war were forced to work for MAN. Among them were Polish, Soviet, French and Dutch forced laborers. According to testimonies, East European workers were treated especially bad. While MAN itself didn't use concentration camp detainees as additionall forced labor, other companies that later after the war joined MAN actually did (Büssing and Steyr-Daimler-Puch).

=== Developments after World War II ===
During World War II, the company experienced revenue growth as Gutehoffnungshütte became involved in armament manufacturing. Production primarily included tanks, diesel engines for submarines, and shell casings in support of the Nazi war effort.

After global shipbuilding increasingly shifted to Far East Asia in the 1970s and engine manufacturers' development costs rose, several large diesel engine manufacturers withdrew from the market at the end of the 1970s. MAN took over the ship engine design and building company Burmeister & Wain in 1979/80. Since then, the development of four-stroke engines has been carried out in Augsburg, while two-stroke engines are designed in Copenhagen. The marketing name for the largest two-stroke engines still has "B&W" in it.

In 1982, the first two-stroke large diesel engine with over 50% efficiency was built. In 1986, the GHH Group was integrated into the MAN Group.

=== From MAN Diesel & Turbo to MAN Energy Solutions ===
MAN Energy Solutions SE was formed in March 2010 from the merger of the two former MAN companies MAN Diesel and MAN Turbo under the name MAN Diesel & Turbo SE. In addition, the Volkswagen Group acquired the majority of the share capital and voting rights of MAN SE in 2011.

In 2013, the company commissioned a methanisation reactor for Europe's first power-to-gas plant in Werlte. Since 2015, the company has been manufacturing marine engines that run on synthetic fuels.

In 2018, the company changed its name to MAN Energy Solutions SE, and shifted its strategy more towards sustainable energy. By 2030, it aims for more than 50% of its business to consist of sustainable technologies. Additionally, the company planned to expand its offerings to include hybrid, storage, and other digital service technologies. Furthermore, the company announced its commitment to the development of low-emission gases as ship fuels. In the same year, MAN Energy Solutions introduced the dual-fuel two-stroke engine MAN B&W ME-LGIP for LPG operation. Also in 2018, MAN Energy Solutions was spun off from the truck and bus business of MAN by Volkswagen.

=== Further Developments and rebrand to Everllence ===
In 2019, the company ventured into the hydrogen economy sector by acquiring a 40% stake in H-Tec Systems, which was then increased to around 99% by 2021. This acquisition marked the company's entry into the production of hydrogen through power-to-X electrolysers.

In 2021, MAN Energy Solutions began developing a seawater-based heat pump for Esbjerg, Denmark, which utilizes seawater for heat generation. Additionally, the company announced the introduction of a hydrogen configuration for gas-powered four-stroke engines in the same year. They also introduced a hydrogen option for gas-powered engines and collaborated with Elbdeich to launch the Elbblue container ship using synthetic methane. Additionally, they're involved in creating Norway's first CO_{2} capture plant for eco-friendly cement production, supplying a compressor system for CO_{2} capture and compression.

In 2022, the MAN 49/60 four-stroke engine series was introduced to the market. These engines are capable of running on LNG, diesel, HFO, and sustainable fuels in both gas and diesel modes.

In 2023, the company conducted trials using carbon-free ammonia as fuel with a two-stroke diesel engine. As a result, MAN Energy Solutions announced plans to provide ammonia propulsion for maritime operations by 2026. In the same year, MAN Energy Solutions equipped 19 container vessels of A. P. Møller-Mærsk shipping company with methanol engines.

In 2024, MAN Energy Solutions signed a contract with Karpowership, Istanbul, for the delivery of 48 dual-fuel engines for their power ship fleet, with the engines to be distributed across multiple floating power plants.

In April 2025, the company received an order from Hindustan Shipyard for their five newbuild Fleet Support Ships (FSS) for the Indian Navy and the order consists of 10 × 20V32/44CR marine engines together with main reduction gearboxes, shaft generators, bow thrusters and MAN Alpha Navy CPP systems.

MAN Energy Solutions was renamed Everllence on 4 June 2025.

== Products ==
MAN Energy Solutions manufactures large engines for ships and power plants, including gas engines used, for instance, in gas power plants for electricity and district heating generation. Additionally, the product range includes energy storage products and the construction of large heat pumps. Other business areas of the company encompass the production and distribution of gas and steam turbines, power plant technology, and reactors for the chemical industry. MAN Energy Solutions is also involved in equipping container freighters with methanol engines. The company offers engines running on ship fuels produced from CO_{2} and hydrogen. Moreover, MAN Energy Solutions supplies electrolysers.

MAN Energy Solutions is also working on the development of a marine engine based on the combustion of climate-neutral fuels such as methanol or ammonia. Additionally, the company offers complete ship propulsion systems, turbomachinery sets for the oil and gas industry as well as the process industry, and complete power plants.

=== Marine Engines ===
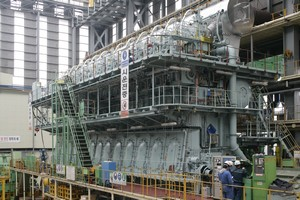
MAN marine engine

Two-stroke engines are developed at the company's base in Copenhagen. Due to their size, the engines are manufactured by international licensees in the immediate vicinity of dockyards. The engines propel large container vessels, freighters and oil tankers. Low-speed diesel engines do not require a transmission system because they are directly connected to the propellers by drive shafts. MAN's market-leading position in two-stroke marine engines means approximately 50% of global trade is moved by MAN engines.

MAN Energy Solutions also offers medium-speed four-stroke engines that can be operated using liquid or gaseous fuel. Medium-speed engines are deployed to propel all types of merchant vessels, but are also used in passenger ships due to their compact nature and their amenability to flexible mounting. As well as cruise liners, other areas of use for medium-speed engines include specialist vessels such as tugs, dredgers or cable-laying ships. Smaller medium-speed four-stroke engines are also used in high-speed ferries and naval vessels. Additionally, the company provides complete propulsion systems, including the main engine, gearbox and propeller.

=== Turbocharger ===
MAN Energy Solutions builds exhaust-gas turbochargers using single-stage radial and axial turbines to create high charging pressures. The performance spectrum of these chargers, which are used both in two-stroke and four-stroke marine engines and in stationary systems, ranges from around 300 kW to 30,000 kW of engine power.

=== Power Plants ===
In the stationary sector, MAN diesel engines are primarily used for power plants and emergency power supplies. MAN Energy Solutions products range from small emergency power generators to turnkey power plants. The power plants are fuelled with heavy fuel oil, diesel, gas or renewable fuels, among others. The gas-powered four-stroke engines developed by the company are hydrogen-ready, allowing for the blending of up to 25% hydrogen into the gas power plant engines to reduce CO_{2} emissions. Additionally, the engines can operate on biogases and synthetic fuels such as green hydrogen.

=== Turbomachinery ===
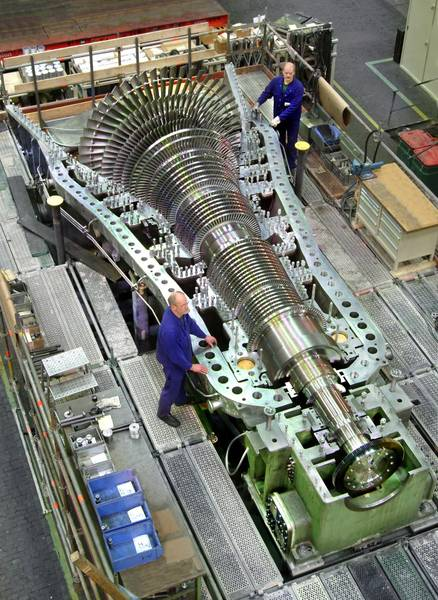
MAN steam turbine

For industrial processes, including the production of fertilizers, iron and steel, as well as for petrochemical-manufacturing applications, MAN Energy Solutions develops and produces a variety of compressors, as well as steam and gas turbines for power generation. Furthermore, the company offers gas-compression systems for the oil and gas industry (Upstream, Midstream and Downstream). This includes hermetically sealed compressors using magnetic bearings as well as high-pressure barrel compressors. MAN Energy Solutions also produces isothermal compressors for use in the production of industrial gases. These are supplied for standard industrial applications, such as in the manufacture of speciality chemicals and metal products. Other applications include the handling of bulk carbon dioxide and the production of bulk quantities of oxygen and nitrogen.

MAN Energy Solutions manufactures the following turbomachinery:

- Turbo compressors (radial, axial, multishaft compressors)
- Expanders (process gas turbines)
- Steam turbines
- Gas turbines
- Process gas screw compressors
- Machinery control systems/regulation systems

=== Chemical reactors and apparatus ===
In Deggendorf (Germany) MAN Energy Solutions produces tubular reactor systems for the chemical and petrochemical industries and research organisations under the brand DWE Reactors.

MAN Energy Solutions Deggendorf is also active in the development of technology for e-fuels. The company designs and manufactures facilities for the production of climate-neutral synthetic fuels, such as environmentally friendly methanol and synthetic natural gas. These fuels are produced using green hydrogen and are used, for example, for the low-emission propulsion of large container ships.

== Company structure ==
As of 2025, Everllence employs around 15,000 people at over 140 locations. In 2024, the company generated sales of around 4.3 billion euros.

Everllence is wholly owned by the Volkswagen Group.

== Awards ==
MAN Energy Solutions was awarded the 16th National German Sustainability Award in 2023.

== Literature ==
- Reuß, Hans-Jürgen (2011). "Zweitakt-Motorenprogramm ganz auf Gas eingestellt. MAN Diesel & Turbo führt in Kopenhagen neuen Motor mit Wechselbetrieb von Diesel auf Gas vor". Hansa – International Maritime Journal (in German) (7). Hamburg: Schiffahrts-Verlag Hansa: 43–44. ISSN 0017-7504.
