= Sikorsky CH-148 Cyclone =

Canadian multi-role naval helicopter

CH-148 Cyclone
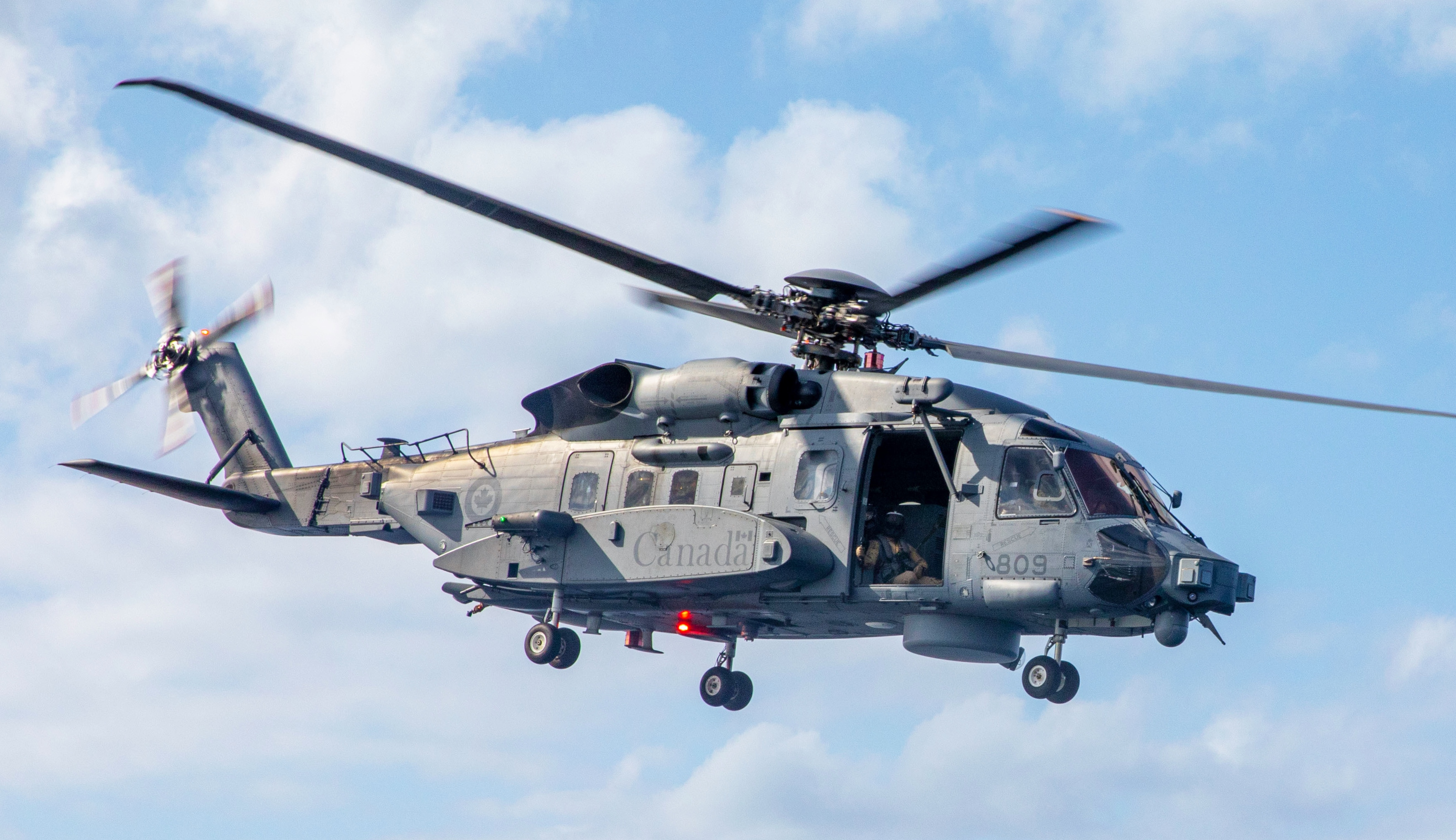
- A CH-148 in 2020

General information
- Type: Maritime helicopter
- National origin: United States
- Manufacturer: Sikorsky Aircraft
- Status: In service
- Primary user: Royal Canadian Air Force
- Number built: 28

History
- Introduction date: July 2018
- First flight: 15 November 2008
- Developed from: Sikorsky S-92

The Sikorsky CH-148 Cyclone is a twin-engine, multi-role shipborne helicopter developed by the Sikorsky Aircraft Corporation for the Canadian Armed Forces. A military variant of the Sikorsky S-92, the CH-148 is designed for shipboard operations and replaced the CH-124 Sea King, which was in Canadian Armed Forces operation from 1963 to 2018.

The Cyclone entered operational service with the Royal Canadian Air Force (RCAF) in 2018 and now conducts anti-submarine warfare (ASW), surveillance, and search and rescue missions from Royal Canadian Navy frigates. The helicopter also performs utility and transport roles in support of national and international security efforts. In 2004, Canada awarded Sikorsky Aircraft a contract for 28 CH-148s with deliveries originally planned to start in 2009. Deliveries were repeatedly delayed due to development issues and difficulty fulfilling contract requirements; the first deliveries, involving six initial helicopters (designated as Block 1), occurred during June 2015. Three years later, the Cyclone Block 2 achieved initial operating capability (IOC). The fleet was briefly grounded in early 2020 following a crash that was attributed to poor documentation and software flaws.

== Development ==
=== Origins ===
Canada began to seek a replacement for the Sea King maritime helicopter in 1986 when it issued a solicitation for the New Shipborne Aircraft (NSA) Project. A variant of the AgustaWestland EH101 was selected and a contract was signed by the nation's governing party at the time, the Progressive Conservatives. After a change of government to the Liberal party, the EH-101 contract was cancelled. The cancellation resulted in a lengthy delay to procure a replacement aircraft. The project took on increased importance in the early 2000s and another procurement competition was initiated.

On 23 November 2004, Canada's Department of National Defence announced the award of a CA$1.8 billion contract to Sikorsky to produce 28 helicopters, with deliveries scheduled to start in January 2009. In addition, Sikorsky's subcontractors, General Dynamics Canada and L-3 MAS are responsible for in-service maintenance and the Maritime Helicopter Training Centre including two Operational Mission Simulators. Other elements of in-service support include the Integrated Vehicle Health Monitoring System, spares and software support.

The first flight of the first production CH-148, serial number 801 (FAA registration N4901C), took place in Florida on 15 November 2008.

=== Delays and upgrades ===
In May 2010, Sikorsky announced an engine upgrade for the CH-148 Cyclone by the end of 2012. General Electric was developing a new engine version based on the CT7-8A1. The CT7-8A1 makes the CH-148 Cyclone heavier and less efficient than expected. General Electric developed the CT7-8A7 to be certified by June 2012 and eventually integrated into the Cyclone as soon as possible. General Electric developed the upgraded engine at its own expense. The new CT7-8A7 engine version produces 10% additional horsepower. The CT7-8A7 included modifications to the fuel manifold and nozzles. Interim CH-148s were to be provided with CT7-8A1 engines.

Additional complications in the program, and restrictions from US government International Traffic in Arms Regulations delayed initial aircraft deliveries until 2010. Further delays resulted in expected delivery pushed to 2015. In 2013 Canada rejected the delivery of "interim" helicopters offered by Sikorsky that lacked critical mission systems. In September 2013, the Canadian government announced that they were reevaluating the CH-148 purchase, and would examine cancelling the contract and ordering different helicopters if that were the better option; by this point, Sikorsky had accrued over $88 million in late damages since 2008.

In June 2014, it was announced that the Canadian government had removed the mandatory requirement from Sikorsky to supply the CH-148 with a 30-minute run-dry main gearbox. This was a key safety feature defined as mandatory in the original RFQ and one of 7 concessions made to Sikorsky. The Canadian government stated that these concessions would not affect the safety of Armed Forces personnel. However, oil loss in the main gearbox followed by several other factors caused the 2009 crash of a S-92, a civil version of the helicopter, off the coast of Newfoundland. Sikorsky added an oil cooler bypass switch and stated a similar accident is extremely unlikely. The effectiveness of the bypass switch has been questioned as it assumes that the leak will happen within the oil cooler assembly, and that the bypass can be activated in time to maintain enough oil. In the case of the S-92 crash, a titanium stud sheared causing catastrophic oil loss through the oil filter assembly.

== Design ==
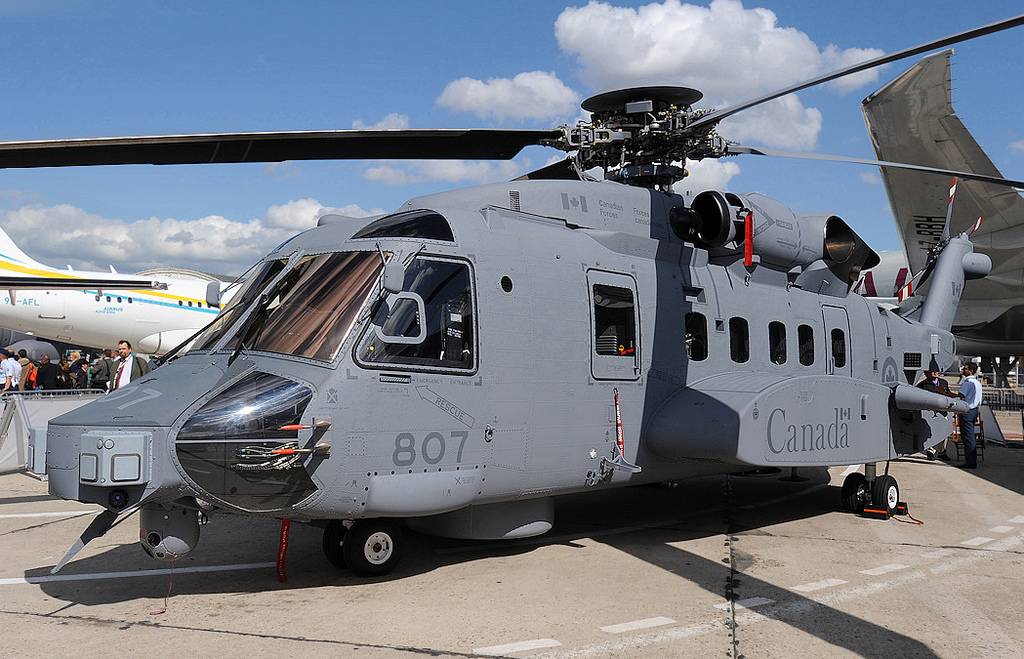
A CH-148 Cyclone at Paris Air Show

The CH-148 has a metal and composite airframe. The four-bladed articulated composite main rotor blade is wider and has a larger diameter than the S-70 Blackhawk. The tapered blade tip sweeps back and angles downward to reduce noise and increase lift. Tethered hover flight has recorded 138 kN (31,000 lbf) of lift generated, both in and out of ground effect. Unlike the Sea King, but in common with almost all current production naval helicopters, the Cyclone is not amphibious and cannot float on water.

A number of safety features such as flaw tolerance, bird strike capability and engine burst containment have been incorporated into the design. An active vibration system ensures comfortable flight and acoustic levels are well below certification requirements. The Cyclone will feature a modified main gearbox, which has been redesigned since a March 2009 accident.

The CH-148 is equipped with devices to search and locate submarines during ASW, and is equipped with countermeasures to protect itself against missile strikes. The Integrated Mission System is being developed by General Dynamics Canada, as is the Sonobuoy Acoustic Processing System. The radar is a Telephonics APS-143B, the EO System a Flir Systems SAFIRE III, the sonar an L-3 HELRAS, and the ESM, a Lockheed Martin AN/ALQ-210. CMC Electronics provides the flight management system, named CMA-2082MH Aircraft Management System.

== Operational history ==
The Canadian Forces were to take delivery of CH-148s beginning in November 2008. In April 2009 the Government of Canada waived late fees and allowed Sikorsky two additional years to deliver compliant Cyclones. In February 2010, the first CH-148 arrived at CFB Halifax. Shearwater Heliport is the headquarters of 12 Wing, which were operating the CH-124 Sea King. Due to delays and export restrictions, the first 19 of the 28 CH-148 Cyclones were to be delivered in an interim standard which does not meet the original contract requirements. This allows operational testing and training to begin before the end of the year.

In March 2010, the first CH-148 was embarked on HMCS Montréal for an intensive open seas trials including landing and takeoff. In June 2010, Sikorsky announced the Canadian Forces would receive six interim CH-148 Cyclones in November 2010. In July 2010, Sikorsky reached an agreement on delay payments and deliveries; deliveries of the remaining CH-148s with full capabilities were to begin in June 2012. All interim-standard helicopters were to be retrofitted by December 2013.

On 22 February 2011, the Office of the Prime Minister of Canada announced the proposed arrival of nine Cyclones on Canada's west coast in the spring of 2014. By March 2011 the six interim CH-148s had not been delivered. On 3 March 2011, the federal government announced that it would impose a fine of up to CA$8 million on Sikorsky for failure to meet contractual obligations. In January 2012 it was reported Sikorsky would deliver five training CH-148s in 2012, including one "fully mission capable" CH-148 by June 2012, or face a further possible $80 million in contract penalties. On 10 July 2012 in reference to Sikorsky missing another delivery deadline, Defence Minister Peter MacKay called the Cyclone purchase "the worst procurement in the history of Canada".

In December 2012, Louis Chenevert, chairman of Sikorsky's parent corporation United Technologies Corporation, stated that the five CH-148s scheduled for delivery in 2012 would instead be delivered in 2013, along with three additional helicopters. The remaining deliveries are to follow. In October 2013, the project appeared to be on the verge of cancellation with the Canadian government ordering a possible change to the maritime helicopter requirements.

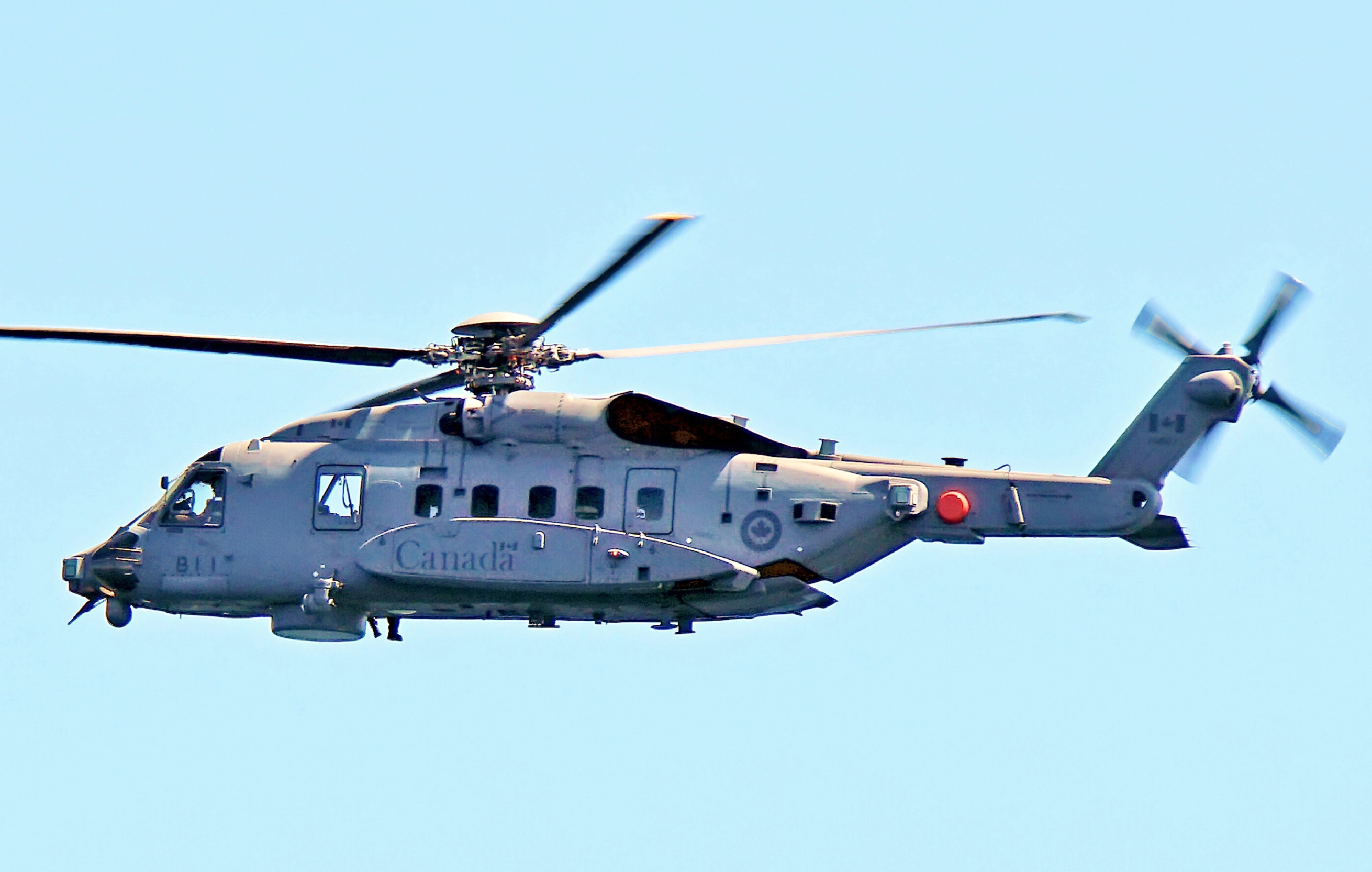
A CH-148 in Nova Scotia in 2017

In June 2015, it was reported that Sikorsky was ready to begin deliveries of the first interim Cyclones to the Royal Canadian Air Force. Six helicopters were delivered on 19 June 2015, and two "Block 1.1" Cyclones were delivered in November–December 2015. These eight helicopters will allow for RCAF training on the Cyclone until the fully operational Block 2 Cyclones start to arrive in 2018. A ninth CH-148 was delivered in August 2016. The eleventh helicopter was delivered in March 2017 as deliveries of the weapons system continue. In June 2018, the Cyclone was declared to have reached its "initial operating capability".

In July 2018, the RCAF announced that the Cyclone was assigned to a Canadian deployment as part of Operation Reassurance, with one helicopter leaving Canada on board HMCS Ville de Québec.

In December 2021, the RCAF found cracks on the tails of 19 of the 23 CH-148s which had been delivered, leaving only 2 CH-148s without defects (the other 2 were already in long-term maintenance and had not been inspected), compromising Operation Lentus. The RCAF claimed that the issue had been addressed by the end of 2021, and CH-148 detachments continued to be deployed frequently on operations around the world throughout 2022. In October 2025, the 28th and final helicopter in Block 2 configuration was delivered.

== Operators ==
Canada

- Royal Canadian Air Force – 28 helicopters delivered as of October 2025, out of 28 total ordered. One helicopter was lost at sea in 2020.
  - 406 Maritime Operational Training Squadron - since summer 2016
  - 423 Maritime Helicopter Squadron - since January 2018
  - 443 Maritime Helicopter Squadron - since August 2018

== Accidents ==
- On 29 April 2020, an RCAF CH-148 from 423 Maritime Helicopter Squadron, attached to HMCS Fredericton and based at Shearwater Heliport crashed in the Ionian Sea during a NATO Mediterranean exercise, killing all six crew members aboard. As a result, all Cyclones in service were placed on an "operational pause" until it was lifted on 16 June 2020. An investigation attributed the accident to the electronic control system and fly-by-wire control law known as "Command Model Attitude Bias Phenomenon". This resulted in the CH-148 responding insufficiently to pilot inputs when the flight director was engaged. The investigation concluded that manufacturer-supplied materials contained "misleading or confusing" information, incomplete sections on automation and lacked manoeuvre descriptions. The recommended fix was to modify software governing the electronic flight control laws and enhance flight mode annunciation and awareness to the crew.
- An accident occurred on October 6, 2026 during a night flight involving CH-148-813 Cyclone, call sign AVALANCHE, operating from the HMCS Ville de Québec in support of Operation Reassurance. Four crew members were on board. No injuries tail, but the rotor section was damaged upon landing due to main rotor striking the rotor tail area.

== Specifications ==

Data from Canadian Forces MHP page, and RCAF CH-148 profile

General characteristics

- Crew: 4 (2 pilots; 1 tactical coordinator, ACSO; 1 sensor operator, AES OP)
- Capacity: 6 in mission configuration, up to 22 in utility configuration.
- Length: 56 ft 2 in (17.12 m) .
- Folded Length: 14.78 m (48.5 ft)
- Width: 17 ft 3 in (5.26 m) fuselage
- Height: 15 ft 5 in (4.70 m) S-92
- Empty weight: 15,600 lb (7,076 kg) S-92
- Max takeoff weight: 29,300 lb (13,290 kg)
- Powerplant: 2 × General Electric CT7-8A7 turboshaft engines, 3,000 shp (2,200 kW) each
- Main rotor diameter: 58 ft 1 in (17.70 m)
- Main rotor area: 2,650 sq ft (246 m^{2}) S-92
- Blade section: - root: Sikorsky SC2110; tip: Sikorsky SSC-A09 - S-92

Performance

- Maximum speed: 165 kn (190 mph, 306 km/h)
- Cruise speed: 137 kn (158 mph, 254 km/h)
- Service ceiling: 15,000 ft (4,600 m)

Armament

- 2 × MK-46 torpedoes on BRU-14 mounted in folding weapons pylons
- Door-arm mounted general-purpose machine gun

== See also ==
Related development

- Sikorsky S-70
- Sikorsky S-92
- Sikorsky VH-92

Aircraft of comparable role, configuration, and era

- AgustaWestland AW101/AgustaWestland CH-149 Cormorant
- Eurocopter AS532 SC Cougar
- Kamov Ka-27
- Mil Mi-38T
- NHIndustries NH90
- Sikorsky SH-3 Sea King/Sikorsky CH-124 Sea King

Related lists

- List of active Canadian military aircraft
- List of rotorcraft
