= Irving Shipbuilding =

Canadian shipbuilder

Irving Shipbuilding Inc.
- Type: Private company
- Industry: Shipbuilding and Repair
- Founded: 1994; 32 years ago
- Headquarters: 3099 Barrington Street; Halifax, Nova Scotia; B3K 5M7
- Key people: Jim D. Irving (CEO); Dirk Lesko (president 2022-present)
- Number of employees: 2000
- Parent: J.D. Irving
- Subsidiaries: Halifax Shipyard, Woodside Shipyard, Marine Fabricators, Fleetway Inc., Oceanic Consulting Corp
- Website: shipsforcanada.ca

Irving Shipbuilding Inc. is a Canadian shipbuilder and in-service support provider.

The company operates as a subsidiary of J.D. Irving Limited. As of 2024, Irving Shipbuilding employs over 2100 shipbuilders.

Irving Shipbuilding owns two shipyards in Nova Scotia: Halifax Shipyard and Woodside Industries, both located along the Halifax Harbour. They also have a marine fabrication shop as well as two engineering and logistics firms: Fleetway Inc, and its subsidiary Oceanic Corp, all located in Dartmouth Nova Scotia.

On August 6, 2013, Kevin M. McCoy joined the company as a president of Irving Shipbuilding. McCoy retired in 2021 and was replaced briefly by Kevin Mooney before Dirk Lesko was appointed in 2022.

== Origin ==
The company's de facto history began in 1959, when K.C. Irving purchased the St. John Dry-dock & Shipbuilding Co. in St John NB, which was then renamed Saint John Shipbuilding & Dry Dock Co. Eventually shortened to Saint John Shipbuilding, it was at this location that Irving constructed Flower-class corvettes, Halifax-class frigates, and two Protecteur class replenishment Oilers (AOR) (not to be confused with Protecteur-class auxiliary vessel) for the Royal Canadian Navy.

Its namesake and current headquarters at The Halifax Shipyard was acquired by Saint John Shipbuilding in 1994 from a group of Nova Scotia investors who had organized it as Halifax-Dartmouth Industries Limited Later renaming the yard to Halifax Shipyard Limited, the purchase resulted in the creation of Irving Shipbuilding.

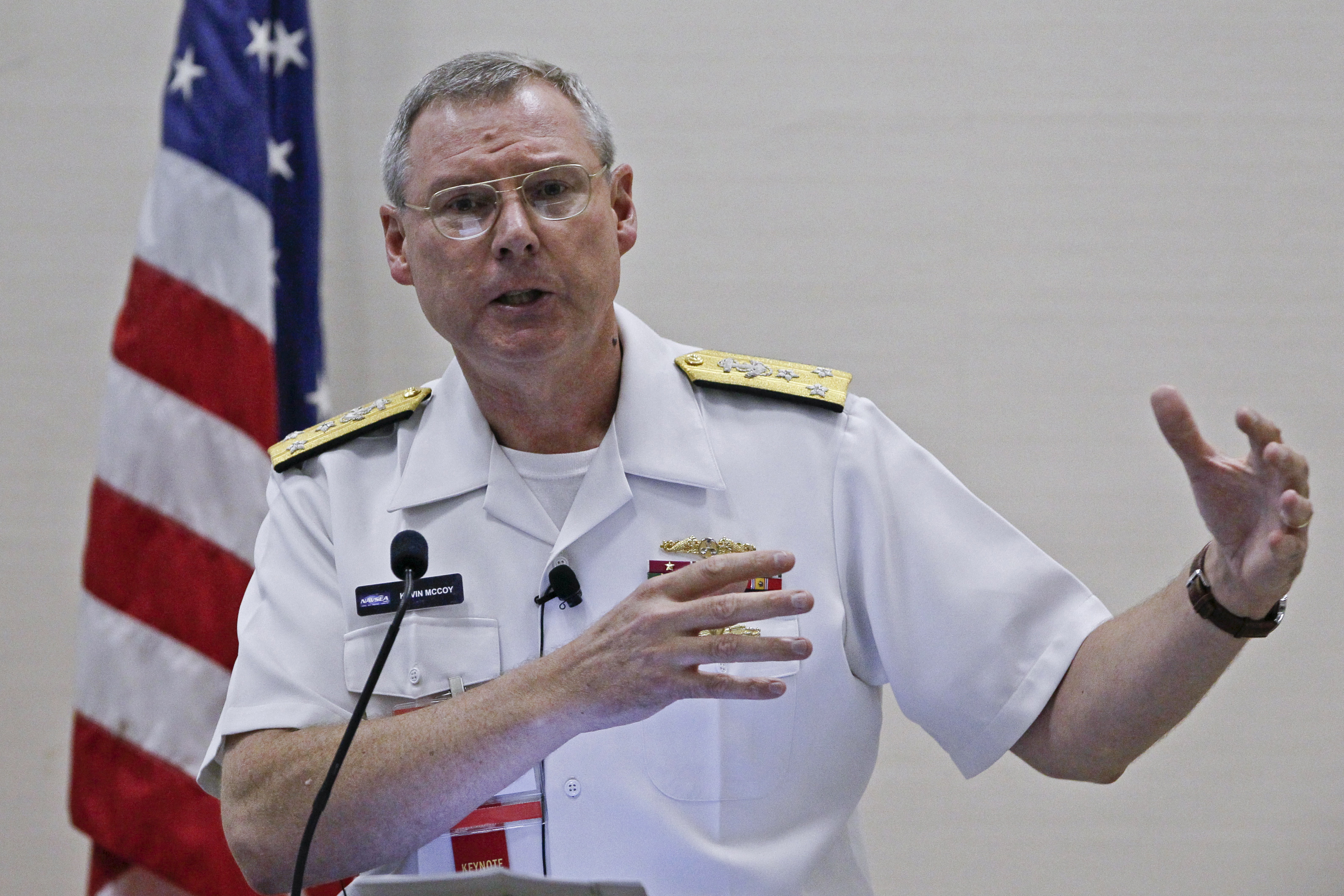
Kevin M. McCoy, president of Irving Shipbuilding Inc. 2013-2021

In 1997, Irving's Saint John Naval Systems acquired and merged with Fleetway Consulting Services Inc, forming a new company— Fleetway Inc to serve as Irving Shipbuilding's engineering and logistical firm. In 2011, Fleetway acquired Oceanic Consulting Corporation (OCC), located in St. John's, NL.

== 20th-century developments ==
=== Canadian Patrol Frigate Project ===
In June 1983, Saint John Shipbuilding underbid Quebec based SCAN Marine Incorporated in securing the Canadian Patrol Frigate Project (CPFP) to build the Halifax-class frigate for the RCN. Politically, this resulted in an outcry from the Quebec caucus of Pierre Trudeau's Liberal party, and to resolve the situation, the Tribal Refit and Update Modernization Program (TRUMP) for the Iroquois-class destroyers was tied to the CPFP. Saint John Shipbuilding was awarded the contract for six frigates with 12 eventually being built. The construction of three of Saint John Shipbuilding's 12 frigates would be subcontracted to Marine Industries and Davie Shipbuilding at Lauzon, Quebec.

=== Maritime Coastal Defence Project ===
In 1992, Quebec-based engineering firm SNC-Lavalin was the successful bidder for the Maritime Coastal Defence Vessel Project, which would build what is today known as the Kingston class of coastal defense vessels. SNC-Lavalin sub-contracted Halifax-Dartmouth Industries Limited (HDIL) for the ship design and construction of the twelve vessels. Saint John Shipbuilding then purchased the HDIL in 1994, before construction had begun.

In 1998, the shipyard was in need of a replacement for the floating dry dock Scotiadock, and thus purchased the General Georges P. Vaniera. The dock was built by Canadian Vickers Ltd in 1964 and was renamed Scotia Dock II. The original Scotiadock was scrapped. Scotiadock 2 sank in 2010 and was also scrapped.

== 21st-century developments ==
In 2012 Irving Shipbuilding received a $300-million loan from the provincial government for modernization of the Halifax Shipyard to accommodate the building of vessels for the federal government.

=== Frigate Life Extension Program (Felex) ===
In 2008 Irving Shipbuilding was awarded a $549M contract to modernize seven of Canada's fleet of Halifax-class frigates. The last of these, HMCS Toronto, completed modernization at the Halifax Shipyard in 2016.

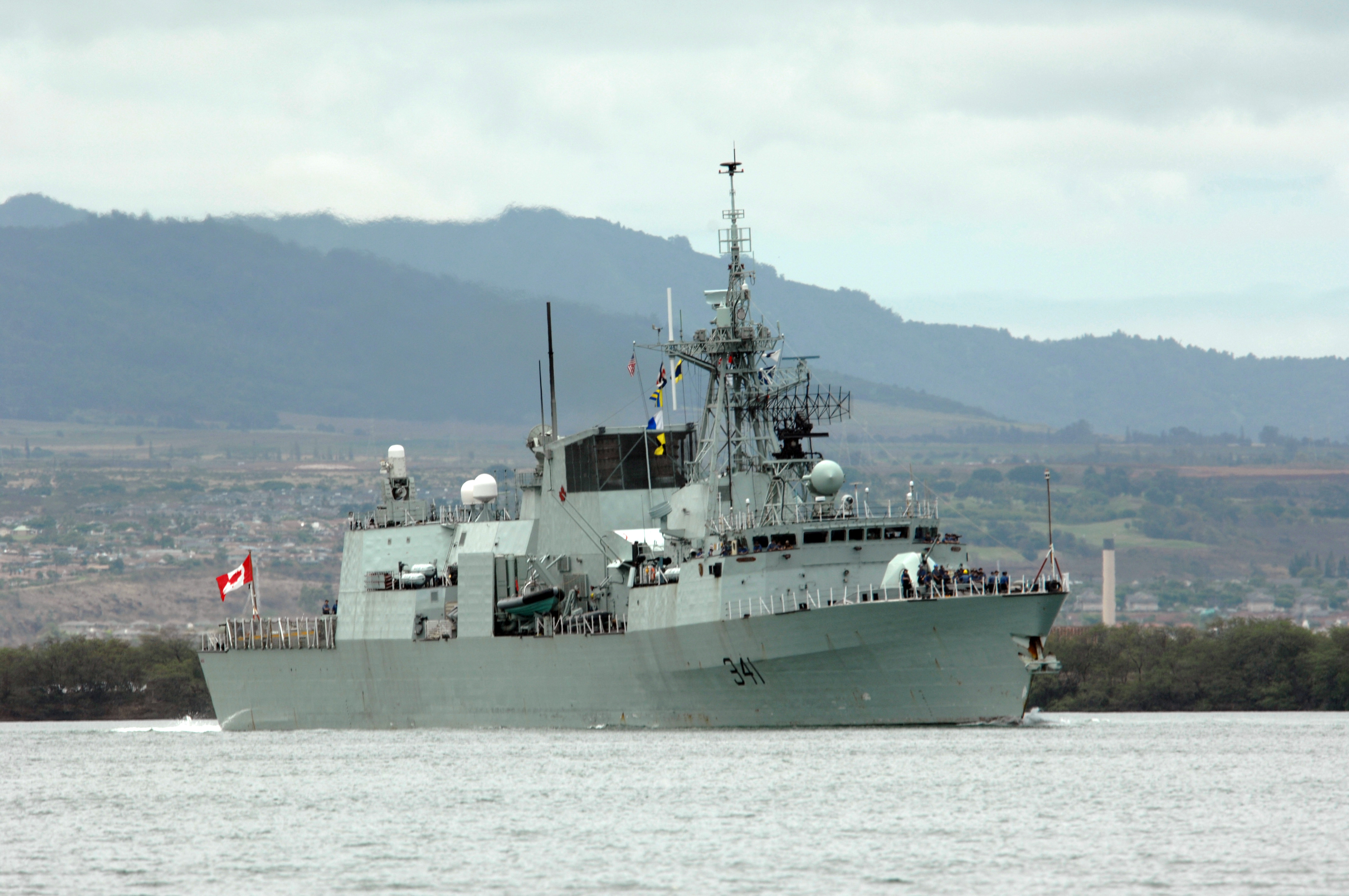
HMCS Ottawa (FFH 341) is an example of a Halifax Class vessel.

In 2019 the Canadian government granted Irving Shipbuilding a $500-million contract to do maintenance work on at least three of its Halifax class frigates as part of an overall $7 billion commitment to all 12.

=== Hero-class midshore patrol vessels ===
In September 2009, the Minister of Fisheries and Oceans and Minister of National Defence announced that nine midshore patrol vessels were being ordered from Irving Shipbuilding to be constructed at Halifax Shipyard for a cost of $194 million. The ships were delivered to the Canadian Coast Guard from 2012 to 2014.

In late 2015 and early 2016, various media outlets carried reports about electrical and mechanical problems dogging the 43-metre ships. Among the concerns cited were: "water could flow from compartment to compartment putting the ship at risk; rolling stabilization; the ability to lower lifeboats with crew on board; and major fire protection issues." Ice buildup was another major concern of the ships and in the summer of 2016, one of the ships had to undergo repairs because of corrosion. Five vessels of the class had to receive redesigned galleys after the initial ones were deemed unsafe.

=== National Shipbuilding Procurement Strategy ===
==== Combat package ====
In 2011, Irving Shipbuilding successfully bid on the combat package of the National Shipbuilding Procurement Strategy. (NSPS) Irving Shipbuilding was thus responsible for building the Royal Canadian Navy's new combat fleet in a program costing $25 billion (subsequently increased to over $80 billion as of 2021) that consists of 23 combatant vessels over a period of 30 years.

Six will be Arctic and Offshore Patrol Ships projected to cost $4.98 billion. (another 2 of which were ordered in 2019 as non-combatant variants for the coast guards Arctic Offshore Patrol Ship project for an additional 2.1 billion) The remaining 15 will be Canadian Surface Combatants(CSC) which will replace the Royal Canadian Navy's Iroquois-class destroyers and Halifax-class frigates, which is projected to cost between $56 and $60 billion.

- The Arctic and Offshore Patrol Ships (AOPS)

On 9 July 2007, Prime Minister Stephen Harper announced a plan to procure six to eight armed naval icebreakers. Dubbed "Arctic Offshore Patrol Ships", the vessels are modeled on the Norwegian Coast Guard ship NoCGV Svalbard.

In 2011, Irving Shipbuilding was selected to construct Canada's Arctic and Offshore Patrol Ships and in March 2013 the Canadian Government signed a $288M contract with Irving shipbuilding for the design of the 6 Arctic and Offshore Patrol Ships. It wasn't until January, 2015 that Irving Shipbuilding and the federal government signed a contract to start construction of the six Arctic offshore patrol ships for $2.3 billion.

As of 2023, Irving Shipbuilding had delivered five of the Arctic and Offshore Patrol Ships.

Halifax Shipyard launched HMCS Harry DeWolf, the first of six Arctic and Offshore Patrol Vessels, on September 15, 2018. At 103 metres and 6,615 tonnes, it is the largest Royal Canadian Navy ship built in Canada in 50 years. The vessel underwent sea testing until 2020, and was delivered to the Royal Canadian Navy on July 31.

The second AOPS, HMCS Margaret Brooke, was delivered to the Royal Canadian Navy on July 15, 2021. The third AOPS, HMCS Max Bernays, was delivered to the Royal Canadian Navy on September 2, 2022. The fourth AOPS, HMCS William Hall, was delivered on August 30, 2023.

Construction of AOPS 5, HMCS Frédérick Rolette, began on May 21, 2021, and it was launched December 9, 2023. AOPS 6, HMCS Robert Hampton Gray, began construction on August 15, 2022. On August 8, 2023, Irving Shipbuilding cut steel for the seventh AOPS, the first of two for the Canadian Coast Guard's fleet.

On 8 August 2023, the Canadian government announced it had amended its definition contract with Irving Shipbuilding, and was providing an additional $463 million "investment" to help Irving Shipbuilding build the Canadian Surface Combatants (CSCs) This amendment allowed both Ottawa and Irving to circumvent the terms of the original "Strategic Partnership" agreement which stipulated that Irving would not seek taxpayer monies to upgrade its facilities.

- Surface combatants

Based on the BAE's Type 26 frigate, Irving Shipbuilding, Lockheed Martin Canada, and BAE Systems are expected to begin work on the Canadian Surface Combatant, sometime in 2024 with a delivery date slated for early 2030. The CSC project is the largest and most complex shipbuilding initiative in Canada since World War II. The Canadian Surface Combatant design contract was signed on 7 February 2019 at an estimated cost of $56–60 Billion.

- Coast Guard Arctic and Offshore Patrol Ships

In May 2019, the Canadian government ordered a pair of non-combatant variants of the Arctic Offshore Patrol Ship for the Canadian Coast Guard. August 8, 2023 Irving Shipbuilding cut steel for the seventh AOPS, the first of two for the Canadian Coast Guard's fleet.

==== National Shipbuilding Strategy Value Proposition obligations ====
As a part of the National Shipbuilding Procurement Strategy, a condition for any forgivable loans or investments is commitment through the Value Proposition Strategy. The strategy requires the shipyards to invest a value equal to 0.5% of contracts to benefit the domestic marine industry in three priority areas: human resources development, technology investment & industrial development.

In October 2016, the Nunavut Research Institute (NRI) and Irving Shipbuilding Inc. awarded $2 million in funding to nine applied arctic research projects. Irving Shipbuilding created the fund as a condition of its multi-billion-dollar contract to build arctic patrol vessels for the Government of Canada.

In March 2017, Irving Shipbuilding announced it would contribute $4.52 million to the Centre for Ocean Ventures and Entrepreneurship (COVE), as part an obligation under the National Shipbuilding Strategy that requires the company to re-invest a portion of its contract revenues.

It invested another $4.4 million to COVE in 2022 under the same obligation.

== Current facilities ==
=== Halifax Shipyard ===
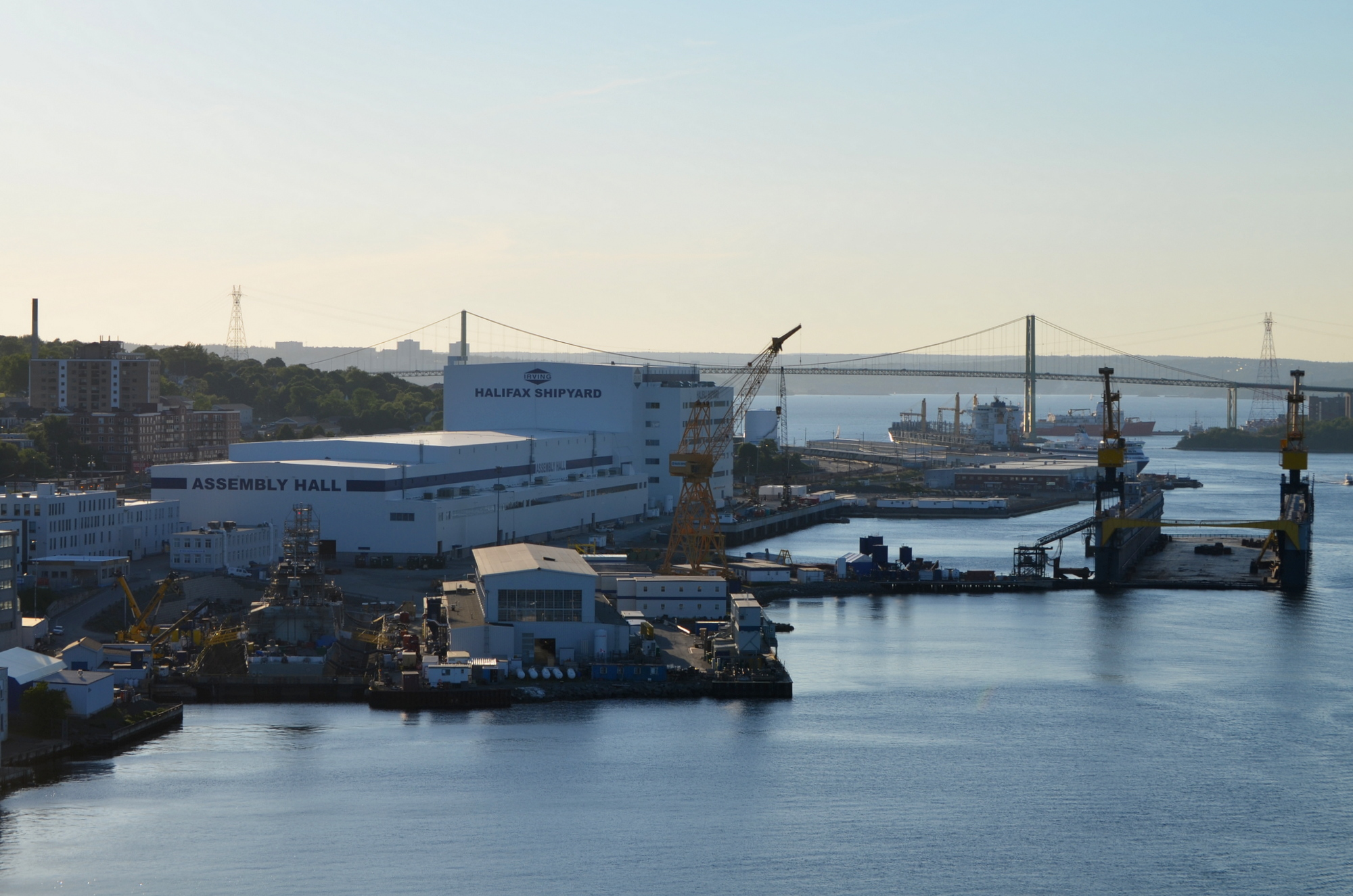
The modernized Halifax Shipyard in 2015

The Halifax Shipyard, totaling at 425,000 square feet, with an assembly and module hall sitting at 408 meters in length and 46 meters in height, is Irving Shipbuilding's largest facility and home to its company's head office. This site was purchased in 1994.

As of 2023 there were roughly 1100 unionized workers employed between the Halifax, Woodside, and Marine Fabricator sites.

=== Woodside Shipyard ===
In 2001, Irving Shipbuilding bought Banc Metals, now called the Woodside Shipyard, in Dartmouth, Nova Scotia. With 11,000 sq. m of covered fabrication and storage space, this site provides industrial fabrication, offshore topsides, and rig upgrades. It also provides various construction, modification, upgrade and maintenance services from its deepwater quayside facilities.

=== Marine Fabricators ===
Purchased in 2013 and located in Dartmouth, Nova Scotia, Marine Fabricators has 9,270m2 of production space, providing steel burning, cutting, forming and fabrication services.

Marine Fabricators carries out the initial work preparing steel for the Arctic and Offshore Patrol Ships currently under construction at Halifax Shipyard. Raw steel is delivered to this facility to be cut, molded and kitted. The kitted steel is delivered by truck to Halifax Shipyard.

=== Bluenose Building ===
Irving Shipbuilding's newest facility, an office space located in Dartmouth, Nova Scotia, is home to Irving's CSC team and Fleetway Inc. At nearly 600 people, the Bluenose Building is home to one of the largest engineering and design workforces in Canada. the Irving Group laid off about 100 workers in 2004 and left the site idle since.

== Previous facilities ==
=== Saint John Shipbuilding ===
On 27 June 2003, Irving Shipbuilding announced that it had signed an agreement with the Canadian government for $55 million in matched dollar-for-dollar investment funding, provided that the Saint John Shipbuilding facility be closed permanently. The facility employed more than 3,000 people at its height in the early 1990s, with only 600 employees at its closure.

In 2006 the site and its buildings were converted into Irving Wallboard.

=== The East Isle Shipyard ===
In 1995 Irving Shipbuilding purchased The East Isle Shipyard in Georgetown, Prince Edward Island from the provincial government and used it to construct tugboats, for its Atlantic Towing fleet until 2010, when it was shut down and sat vacant for 13 years. It was eventually resold to the province in 2023.

=== Irving Steel and Engine Products Ltd. ===
Thompson Bros. Machinery Co., Ltd., Liverpool NS was started in 1900 as a fabricator and distributor of diesel engines among other machinery, and eventually became a significant ship repair yard during WWII. It devoted a portion of its facility to boat building, refitting several flower class corvettes like HMCS Dauphin & HMCS Amherst. Sometime after the war, it was purchased by J.D Irving Limited, and continued operation as Steel & Engine Products, Ltd (STENPRO).

After purchasing STENPRO, J.D Irving Limited would continue its use as a fabricator and machine shop and by 1957 STENPRO was producing "Oil burners, storage tanks and truck tanks." and by the 1960s was producing boats. STENPRO merged with Irving Shipbuilding in 1998, and the site closed in 2003. Irving Shipbuilding retained ownership of the site until at least 2017, when it supposedly transferred ownership to Atlantic Towing.

=== Shelburne Ship Repair ===
In 1996, in face of Shelburne Ship Repair closing, the province decided to lease the facility to Irving Limited. Minister of Transportation Richard Mann proclaimed, "The province has just made a deal with Steel and Engine Products Limited - STENPRO - an Irving company up the coast in Liverpool. STENPRO will reopen the yard as a ship repair/fabrication operation, an operation that will employ local workers... STENPRO will lease Shelburne Marine for five years. The lease is renewable and the company has the option to buy at any time. Steel and Engine will be responsible for all operating costs. They will start looking for orders as soon as the plant is ready."

In January 2010, ownership of Shelburne Ship Repair was transferred to Irving Shipbuilding in an agreement under the province's Industrial Expansion Fund whereby Nova Scotia would provide an $8.8-million loan for the yard's upgrades. Irving Shipbuilding had operated the Shelburne Ship Repair for 13 years under lease.

Later in 2010, the province of Nova Scotia & Irving Shipbuilding invested $16.6 million in upgrades of Shelburne Ship Repair to modernize the wharf, including the yard's buildings and offices, its cradle, and the marine railway.

The facility was sold to Mersey Seafoods in 2022.

=== Pictou Shipyard ===
Acquired around 1996, The 18-acre site has 600 feet of deepwater wharfage and load-out area and a 127000 square foot fully enclosed high bay assembly building with over head cranes. The Irving Group laid off about 100 workers in 2004 and let the site idle until owner Besim Halef later leased the site to Aecon Fabco from 2008 until 2021.

== Controversies ==
Irving Shipbuilding as part of J.D. Irving Limited is often criticized by both the local government and the media over its scale of operations, with some people claiming the family holds a monopoly over the atlantic provinces.

=== Sinking of the Irving Whale ===
The Irving Whale is a Canadian barge that sank off the north coast of Prince Edward Island, while en route from Halifax, Nova Scotia to Bathurst, New Brunswick, taking 4,200 tonnes of fuel oil down with it. It was laid down at the Saint John Shipbuilding & Dry Dock Co., Ltd., Saint John in 1966. It carried oil for JDI from 1967 until it sank in 1970.

About 1,100 tonnes of oil spilled into the ocean, 5,700 kilograms of which were laced with PCBs. The cost of the salvage operation was $42 million, and was assumed by the federal government with great controversy. This was given due to the wealth of Irving Oil Ltd, owner of the cargo of oil, and J.D. Irving Ltd., owner of the barge.

In March 1995, Environment Canada reached an agreement with an Irving Oil company, Atlantic Towing Ltd, to provide assistance in the salvage operation, along with Irving Shipbuilding, who would clean and recover Irving Whale upon her salvage. On 30 July 1996, Irving Whale was hoisted by derrick barges Chesapeake and Boabarge 9 to the surface in approximately 70 minutes. Irving Whale arrived in Halifax Harbour on 7 August 1996 and was transferred to the care of Irving Shipbuilding. The barge's cargo was removed and the cargo hold cleaned before the barge underwent a refit. Following the refit, the barge was transferred to Atlantic Towing Ltd, and renamed ATL 2701 in 2001 for service as a general cargo barge. It was renamed again as Atlantic Sea Lion in 2009.

The dispute with the federal government ended in 2000, with the Irving companies paying $5 million, without admitting liability. This resulted in a legal battle between the Irvings and their insurers who, coincidentally, had covered them for up to $5 million. The policy was decades old, and the Irvings were not legally obliged to pay the $5 million.

=== Chinese spy accusations ===
On November 30, 2013, engineer Qing Quentin Huang, an ex-employee of Lloyd's Register, a subcontractor to Irving Shipbuilding, was arrested under the Security of Information Act after attempting to communicate secrets to a foreign power. Police said the information was related to elements of the federal shipbuilding strategy, which includes patrol ships, frigates, naval auxiliary vessels, science research vessels and ice breakers. Huang was arrested in Burlington, Ont., following an RCMP-led investigation called Project Seascape. Huang was not a target of the warrant and had never been under CSIS investigation. However, At the time, the Canadian Security Intelligence Service (CSIS) were intercepting communications made to and from the Chinese Embassy after obtaining a warrant. CSIS advised the RCMP of phone calls Huang allegedly made to the embassy, and claimed he had "offered to provide Canadian military secrets" to the Chinese government. That prompted the Ontario National Security Enforcement Team, working with the Toronto Police Service, to have undercover operators pose as Chinese agents and approach him about acquiring the documents, resulting in Huang's arrest. He was granted bail during the whole ordeal.

Eight years after his arrest, a judge stayed charges against Qing Quentin Huang "on the basis of unreasonable delay."

=== Pearl Mist ===
Pearl Mist is a small cruise ship that was the center of a legal dispute between US owner Pearl Seas Cruises and Irving Shipbuilding Inc, over breach of contract. In 2013 a United States federal appeals court ruled in favour of Irving subject to the contracts arbitration clause, and a settlement was reached. Pearl Mist was accepted by Pearl Seas Cruises and towed to Baltimore, Maryland, in April 2013.

=== Suicide ===
On November 28, 2013, between 200 and 300 workers walked off the job, complaining of growing frustrations over increasing numbers of disciplinary letters, firings and suspensions of other employees. The walkout occurred after the suicide of a worker who had just received a 30-day suspension, although no official correlation between the suicide and suspension was ever made. Irving defended administering the suspension but would not elaborate.

=== Municipal property tax break ===
Halifax Regional Council approved a special 25-year property tax deal for Irving Shipbuilding. The tax deal was accidentally disclosed, but not debated, in late March, after a year of negotiations between the city and Irving officials. The Irving shipyard had previously been paying $1.6 million a year on their waterfront facility. The new 25-year agreement (with a possible 10-year extension) dropped Irving's payment down to $563,000 with an annual one percent increase.

The company also received a refund from the city for the difference already paid at the prior rate. Halifax defended the deal by saying it feared a drawn-out legal fight with Irving.

=== Paradise Papers ===
In 2017, 13.4 million confidential records were leaked to German reporters Frederik Obermaier and Bastian Obermayer, from the newspaper Süddeutsche Zeitung. In 2022 it was revealed by these papers that J.D. Irving Limited had created an offshore insurance company in Bermuda that allowed them to move millions of dollars in profits out of Canada and into the tax haven. The Irving-owned Bermuda insurance company, F.M.A. Ltd, sold insurance premiums to Irving companies in Canada and Bermuda for their marine vessels.

F.M.A. then re-insured major risks to those vessels by paying lower premiums to a non-Irving reinsurance company based in Bermuda. This allowed F.M.A. to accumulate almost $13.4 million in un-taxed income between when it was incorporated in 1973, and 2001, the last year provided by the leaked records.

Jim Irving, J.D. Irving Limited's co-CEO, has stated it had dissolved its connections to Bermuda prior to the release, but Statistics Canada's inter-corporate ownership database continues to list five Bermuda companies, including F.M.W., associated with Irving as of its annual update on June 17, 2022.

=== Threatening journalists ===
Irving Shipbuilding threatened to sue journalist David Pugliese 90 minutes after submitting questions to the Department of National Defense. The DND confirmed it contacted Irving and informed them of Pugliese's identity and his questions. Pugliese's questions revolved around potential problems with the welding on the new Arctic patrol ships that Irving is building for the Royal Canadian Navy.

Shortly after, the company again threatened to sue journalists at the Globe and Mail, after Office of Innovation minister Navdeep Bains alerted them that journalists were asking why Irving Shipbuilding received a $40 million benefit toward an Alberta french fry plant as part of its industrial benefits requirements established under the Arctic Offshore Patrol Ship program.

The privacy commissioner's office would later conclude that the Department of National Defense contravened provisions of the Privacy Act after it informed Irving Shipbuilding of questions submitted by the journalists. Irving then claimed it threatened to sue journalists to protect the government's shipbuilding reputation, but the DND disputes the company's story. The Department of Innovation, Science and Economic Development says it has a contract with Irving that requires the department to alert the firm when journalists are asking questions related to the company.

In May, Canada's federal procurement minister stated she "wishes the Irving company hadn’t threatened to sue reporters asking questions about the company’s federal shipbuilding contracts."

=== Potato chip factory ===
The federal government in 2019 allowed Irving Shipbuilding to claim a $40-million industrial benefit credit for an Alberta french fry factory as part of the contract to provide the Royal Canadian Navy with new Arctic and Offshore Patrol Ships.

=== Covid protocols ===
In July 2020 Nova Scotia's chief medical officer of health, Dr. Robert Strang, backtracked his approval of three executives not having to self-isolate after traveling abroad on business, after workers at the Halifax shipyard learned of the exception and complained to his office. After ordering the executives to self-isolate he barred Irving executives from engaging in any more business travel to America until the emergency measures were lifted. "Even though the safety requirements were part of my approval, the meetings could have been done virtually," Strang said, while claiming he "never should have approved a plan".

In November 2020, about 90 workers at the Halifax Shipyard invoked the right to refuse unsafe work after learning an out of province worker had been brought in using a public health exemption to Covid regulations. A representative for the union said workers were concerned about health and safety protocols, exacerbated by a lack of information from the employer. The work refusal triggered an occupational health and safety investigation by Nova Scotia's Labour Department, and Irving Shipbuilding received a verbal warning after the department found the company had failed to properly inform the workers.

=== Strategic Partnership Agreement Umbrella contracts ===
In June 2022, the Canadian government was accused of considering a $300 million payment to Irving Shipbuilding so it could modernize its facilities to build navy vessels despite an earlier stipulation in the National Shipbuilding Procurement Strategy Strategic Partnership Agreement Umbrella Contracts stating that public funds would not be requested for such upgrades.

Tom Ring, who was Canada's Procurement Minister when the National Shipbuilding Procurement Strategy was proposed, suggests that this request for funds contravened the terms of the original Umbrella Agreement between Irving and the federal government. This agreement, according to the terms written at the time, stipulated that any upgrades required by the builders be financed with their own profit margins.

On 8 August 2023, Ottawa announced it had amended its definition contract with Irving Shipbuilding, and provide an infrastructure "investment" worth an additional $463 million to help Irving Shipbuilding build the Canadian Surface Combatants (CSCs). It stated, "enhancements at Irving Shipbuilding will expand and modify their site and facilities at the Halifax Shipyard and supporting facilities at Woodside Industries and Marine Fabricators in Dartmouth, Nova Scotia." This amendment allowed both Ottawa and Irving to circumvent the terms of the original Strategic Partnership Agreement which stipulated that Irving would not seek taxpayer monies to upgrade its facilities, but would instead make any such upgrades via their own funds. This sum is expected to "create or maintain over 800 jobs annually across various industries in the Canadian economy."

== Accidents and investigations ==
- In May 2010, the 152-metre-long dry dock Scotiadock II was submerged to allow a tugboat to enter the dry dock for maintenance, but instead of lifting the tug out of the water, the dock kept sinking. It stayed on the bottom of Halifax harbor for nearly a month and taxpayers contributed $260 million to build a new floating dock at the Irving Shipyard.
- On July 2, 2015, Irving Shipbuilding faced four charges under Nova Scotia's Occupational Health and Safety Act after a worker was struck when a cable being used to launch a ship snapped and struck him in the head. The worker suffered a fractured skull and brain damage. The results of the investigation pointed toward negligence on the part of Irving. Irving initially entered a not guilty plea, but eventually withdrew this and was charged under all four counts.
- In April 2016, a fire on HMCS Toronto resulted in 64 workers needing to evacuate and two hospitalizations; both were released shortly. That same month, during a site visit conducted on April 8, health and safety inspectors determined that work was being performed on ships containing lead primer by workers who did not know how to safely remove it. In a statement to PaintSquare News, Irving Shipbuilding confirmed that an employee contacted the government agency in April based on concerns about a 2014 blood lead test performed by a personal physician. In response, the shipyard was issued a warning regarding control of dust buildup and requirements regarding clothing contamination and the separation of work and street clothing. The alleged burning of paint and presence of paint chip debris also warranted a warning for the violation of safe work procedures. Inspectors also reported that the shipyard did not have a lead control program in place and was unable to supply a written document during the site visit. Since not all workers, including contractors, were aware of the hazards of working with lead, the company was ordered to provide awareness training on the topic before April 25. A separate compliance order, issued on April 12, requires Irving Shipbuilding to deliver a copy of its lead control program for removal of lead paint on ships; this document is to include a risk assessment for various work processes as well.
- In May 2016, a scaffolding used to paint the ship HMCS Toronto fell over in high winds while workers were dismantling it. In an email, a representative for Irving Shipbuilding said no one was injured, while Unifor/MWF Local 1 union business agent Zibby Kwiatek claimed, "If it was during working hours, we would have casualties," and cited concerns about Irving trying to find "efficiencies" at the worksite.
- In July 2019, a forty-year-old subcontractor was struck on the head by the lid of the sandblasting equipment he was using, resulting in a fall of several feet. He died three days later.
- On August 6, 2020, the decision of four employees to exercise their right to refuse unsafe work, due to the mixing of silica, was upheld by the Nova Scotia Labor Board. An electrician raised safety concerns during the refit of HMCS Toronto. Despite the employer's assurances it would take steps to reduce the risk and prevent a re-occurrence, two days later the employees once again refused work. By August 12, three of the four employees involved agreed to return to work, while the outlier contacted a company OHS officer, who upon inspection of the shipyard failed to using any warnings or compliance orders. The JOHSC ordered the individual back to work. Six days later, on August 21, the employee filed their notice of appeal, stating the committee's decision was flawed and addressing the issue of whether an OHS officer has the right to intervene in or uphold a work refusal in such a case. In its decision, citing section 43 of the act, the Labour Board sided with the employee, stating, "total deference to the JOHSC is neither required by the Occupational Health and Safety Act nor is it advised," and the suggestion that an employee has no right to question or challenge that advice "would be inconsistent with the scheme of the act which provides for an appeal of officers’ decisions both to act and to not act."
- In February 2024, a 43-year-old worker was struck by a piece of snow removal equipment and pronounced dead at the scene. The Labor Department said its safety officers are actively investigating the death, Halifax Regional Police said it is also investigating the death. "A Stop Work Order has been issued, and a review is underway of existing safe work procedures around snow removal processes, and mechanical assessment of the equipment involved," said labor department spokesperson Monica MacLean.
