= HMCS St. John's =

Royal Canadian Navy frigate

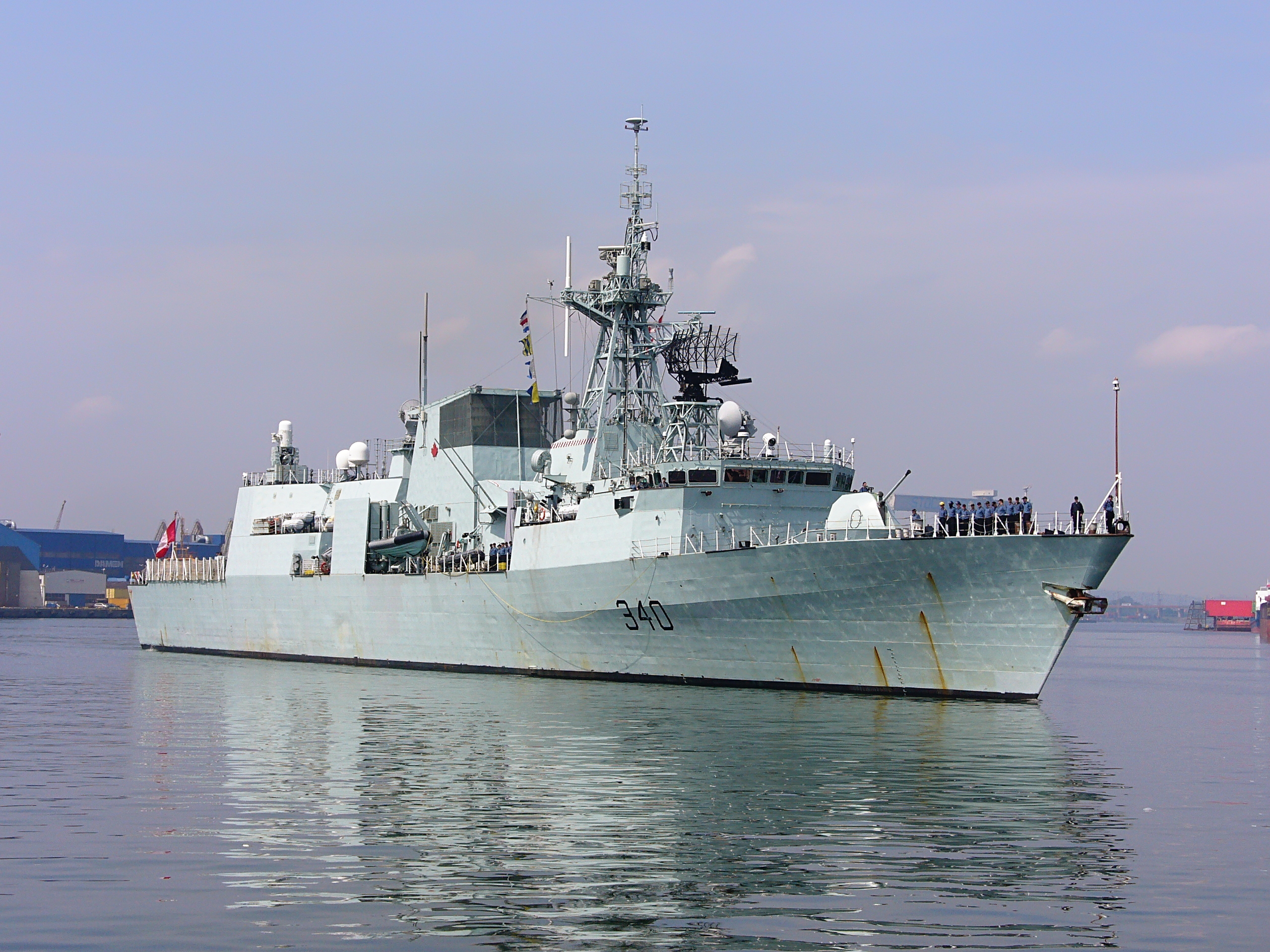
- HMCS St. John's at Gdynia, Poland in 2007

History

Canada
- Name: St. John's
- Namesake: St. John's, Newfoundland and Labrador
- Builder: Saint John Shipbuilding Ltd., Saint John
- Laid down: 24 August 1994
- Launched: 26 August 1995
- Commissioned: 24 June 1996
- Home port: CFB Halifax
- Identification: MMSI number: 316196000; Callsign: CGAK; Pennant number FFH 340
- Motto: Avancez (Advance)
- Honours and awards: Arabian Sea
- Status: In active service
- Badge

General characteristics
- Class & type: Halifax-class frigate
- Displacement: 3,995 tonnes (light); 4,795 tonnes (operational); 5,032 tonnes (deep load)
- Length: 134.2 m (440.3 ft)
- Beam: 16.5 m (54.1 ft)
- Draught: 7.1 m (23.3 ft)
- Propulsion: 2 × LM2500 gas turbines; 1 × SEMT Pielstick diesel engine
- Speed: 30 knots (56 km/h; 35 mph)
- Range: 9,500 nmi (17,594 km; 10,932 mi)
- Complement: 255 (including air detachment)
- Armament: Missiles; 2 × quad Mk 141 canisters for 8 × RGM-84 Harpoon block II AShM/LAM; 2 × 8-cell Mk 48 vertical launch system firing 16 × RIM-162 Evolved Sea Sparrow block II SAM/SSM; Guns; 1 × Bofors 57 mm Mk3 gun; 1 × Phalanx CIWS Mk 15 Mod 21 block 1B; 4 × .50-calibre M2HQ Mini Typhoon NRWS; Torpedoes; 2 × twin 324 mm (12.8 in) Mk 32 torpedo tubes for 24 × Honeywell Mk 46 Mod 5 torpedoes
- Aircraft carried: 1 × CH-148 Cyclone
- Aviation facilities: Hangar and flight deck

HMCS St. John's (FFH 340) is a Halifax-class frigate that has served in the Canadian Forces and the Royal Canadian Navy since her commissioning in 1996. She is the eleventh of twelve ships in her class, which emergedfrom the Canadian Patrol Frigate Project. St. John's is named after the city of St. John's, Newfoundland and Labrador, a port city associated with Canadian naval history and heritage, and is the first ship in the Royal Canadian Navy to bear the name.

St. John's serves on Canadian Armed Forces missions protecting Canada's sovereignty in the Atlantic Ocean and enforcing Canadian laws in its territorial sea and exclusive economic zone. St. John's has been deployed on missions throughout the Atlantic Ocean, to the Indian Ocean; specifically the Persian Gulf and Arabian Sea on anti-terrorism operations, to the north as far as Grise Fiord and to the Caribbean where she played a role in helping to stop the flow of illicit drugs to North America. She is assigned to Maritime Forces Atlantic (MARLANT) and her homeport is in Halifax, Nova Scotia.

== Description and design ==
The Canadian government launched a Patrol Frigate Project in the mid-1970s to find a replacement for the aging St. Laurent, Restigouche, Mackenzie, and Annapolis classes of destroyer escorts, which were all tasked with anti-submarine warfare. The Halifax-class frigate design emerged from this process, and the ships were ordered in batches; St. John's was ordered in December 1987 as part of the second batch. To reflect the changing long term strategy of the Navy during the 1980s and 1990s, the Halifax-class frigates was designed as a general purpose warship with particular focus on anti-submarine capabilities.

As built, the Halifax-class vessels displaced 4,750 long tons (4,830 t) and were 134.6 metres (441 ft 9 in) long overall and 124.5 metres (408 ft 5 in) between perpendiculars with a beam of 16.4 metres (53 ft 8 in) and a draught of 5.0 metres (16 ft 4 in). That made them slightly larger than the Iroquois-class destroyers. The vessels are propelled by two shafts with Escher Wyss controllable pitch propellers driven by a CODOG system of two General Electric LM2500 gas turbines, generating 47,500 shaft horsepower (35,421 kW) and one SEMT Pielstick 20 PA6 V 280 diesel engine, generating 8,800 shaft horsepower (6,562 kW).

This gives the frigates a maximum speed of 29 knots (54 km/h; 33 mph) and a range of 7,000 nautical miles (12,964 km; 8,055 mi) at 15 knots (28 km/h; 17 mph) while using their diesel engines. Using their gas turbines, the ships have a range of 3,930 nautical miles (7,278 km; 4,523 mi) at 18 knots (33 km/h; 21 mph). The Halifax class have a complement of 198 naval personnel of which 17 are officers and 17 aircrew of which 8 are officers.

St. John's is the eleventh of twelve ships in her class. She is named after the city of St. John's, Newfoundland and Labrador, a port city associated with Canadian naval history and heritage, and is the first ship in the Royal Canadian Navy to bear the name.

=== Armament and aircraft ===
As built the Halifax-class vessels deployed the CH-124 Sea King helicopter, which acted in concert with shipboard sensors to seek out and destroy submarines at long distances from the ships. The ships have a helicopter deck fitted with a "bear trap" system allowing the launch and recovery of helicopters in up to sea state 6. The Halifax class also carries a close-in anti-submarine weapon in the form of the Mark 46 torpedo, launched from twin Mark 32 Mod 9 torpedo tubes in launcher compartments either side of the forward end of the helicopter hangar.

As built, the anti-shipping role is supported by the RGM-84 Harpoon Block 1C surface-to-surface missile, mounted in two quadruple launch tubes at the main deck level between the funnel and the helicopter hangar. For anti-aircraft self-defence the ships are armed with the Sea Sparrow vertical launch surface-to-air missile in two Mk 48 Mod 0 eight-cell launchers placed to port and starboard of the funnel. The vessels carry 16 missiles. A Raytheon/General Dynamics Phalanx Mark 15 Mod 21 Close-In Weapon System (CIWS) is mounted on top of the helicopter hangar for "last-ditch" defence against targets that evade the Sea Sparrow.

As built, the main gun on the forecastle is a 57 mm (2.2 in)/70 calibre Mark 2 gun from Bofors. (Note: The 70 calibre denotes the length of the gun. This means that the length of the gun barrel is 70 times the bore diameter.) The gun is capable of firing 2.4-kilogram (5.3 lb) shells at a rate of 220 rounds per minute at a range of more than 17 kilometres (11 mi). The vessels also carry eight 12.7 mm (0.50 in) machine guns.

=== Countermeasures and sensors ===
As built, the decoy system comprises Two BAE Systems Shield Mark 2 decoy launchers which fire chaff to 2 kilometres (1 mi) and infrared rockets to 169 metres (185 yd) in distraction, confusion and centroid seduction modes. The torpedo decoy is the AN/SLQ-25A Nixie towed acoustic decoy from Argon ST. The ship's radar warning receiver, the CANEWS (Canadian Electronic Warfare System), SLQ-501, and the radar jammer, SLQ-505, were developed by Thorn and Lockheed Martin Canada.

Two Thales Nederland (formerly Signaal) SPG-503 (STIR 1.8) fire control radars are installed one on the roof of the bridge and one on the raised radar platform immediately forward of the helicopter hangar. The ship is also fitted with Raytheon AN/SPS-49(V)5 long-range active air search radar operating at C and D bands, Ericsson HC150 Sea Giraffe medium-range air and surface search radar operating at G and H bands, and Kelvin Hughes Type 1007 I-band navigation radar. The sonar suite includes the CANTASS Canadian Towed Array and GD-C AN/SQS-510 hull mounted sonar and incorporates an acoustic range prediction system. The sonobuoy processing system is the GD-C AN/UYS-503.

=== Modernization ===
The Halifax class underwent a modernization program, known as the Halifax Class Modernization (HCM) program, in order to update the frigates' capabilities in combating modern smaller, faster and more mobile threats. This involved upgrading the command and control, radar, communications, electronic warfare and armament systems. Further improvements, such as modifying the vessel to accommodate the new Sikorsky CH-148 Cyclone helicopter and satellite links will be done separately from the main Frigate Equipment Life Extension (FELEX) program.

The FELEX program comprised upgrading the combat systems integration to CMS330. The SPS-49 2D long range air search radar was replaced by the Thales Nederland SMART-S Mk 2 E/F-band 3D surveillance radar, and the two STIR 1.8 fire control radars were replaced by a pair of Saab Ceros 200 re-control radars. A Telephonics IFF Mode 5/S interrogator was installed and the Elisra NS9003A-V2HC ESM system replaced the SLQ-501 CANEWS. An IBM multi-link (Link 11, Link 16 and Link 22 enabled) datalink processing system was installed along with two Raytheon Anschütz Pathfinder Mk II navigation radars. Furthermore, Rheinmetall's Multi-Ammunition Soft kill System (MASS), known as MASS DUERAS was introduced to replace the Plessey Shield decoy system. The existing 57 mm Mk 2 guns were upgraded to the Mk 3 standard and the Harpoon missiles were improved to Block II levels, the Phalanx was upgraded to Block 1B and the obsolete Sea Sparrow system was replaced by the Evolved Sea Sparrow Missile.

== Construction and career ==
The frigate's keel was laid down on 24 August 1994 by Saint John Shipbuilding Ltd. at their shipyard in Saint John, New Brunswick. The ship was launched on 26 August 1995 and commissioned into the Canadian Forces on 24 June 1996 in St. John's, and carries the hull classification symbol FFH 340.

On 7 August 1997, the frigate joined NATO's Standing Naval Force Atlantic (STANAVFORLANT), returning to Canada on 18 December. The following year, the frigate took part in the NATO naval exercise Strong Resolve off Norway and deployed to the Adriatic Sea for operations with NATO's Standing Naval Force Mediterranean (STANAVFORMED). In 2000, the ship took part in UNITAS, a multi-national naval exercise. As part of Operation Apollo, Canada's contribution to the War in Afghanistan, St. John's sailed to the Gulf of Oman. Leaving Halifax, Nova Scotia on 1 May 2002, the frigate participated in fleet support and maritime interdiction missions. The warship returned to Halifax on 17 November 2002.

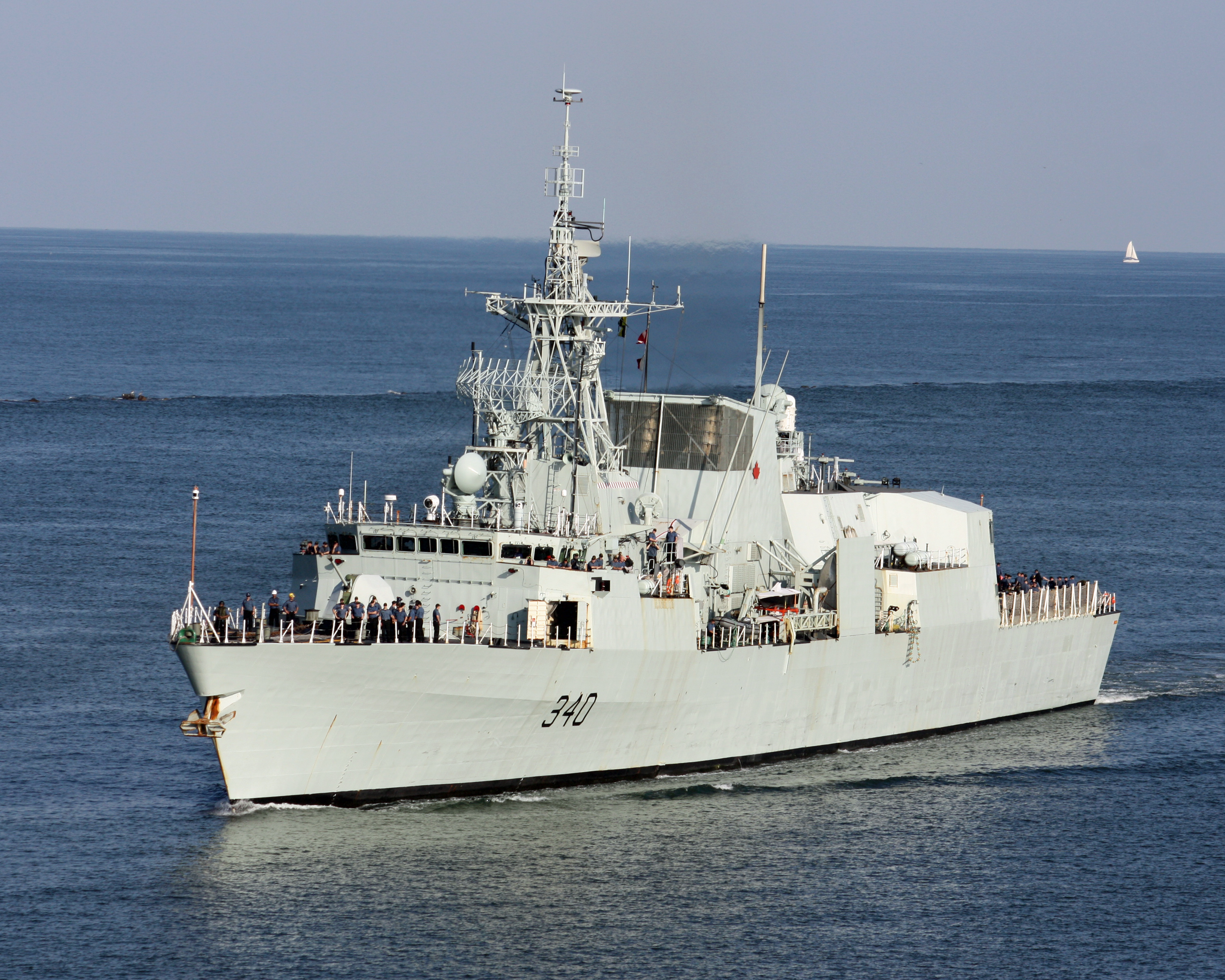
HMCS St. John's at Charleston, South Carolina, in 2010

In 2004, after the submarine HMCS Chicoutimi suffered a fire off the coast of Ireland, the frigate responded at rapid speed from the vicinity of Newfoundland and arrived on scene four days later to provide support to the stricken vessel. As the incident coincided with Canadian Thanksgiving, the crew of St. John's sent over hot Canadian Thanksgiving turkey dinners to the Chicoutimi crew, who had not even realized it was the holiday. In 2005, the frigate, with the destroyer Athabaskan, frigate Toronto and the Canadian Coast Guard ship Sir William Alexander were sent to Louisiana to aid in recovery efforts following the devastation wrought by Hurricane Katrina. In 2008, the vessel took part in Operation Caribbe, Canada's contribution to an ongoing U.S.-led, multinational effort to interdict drug trafficking in the international waters of the Caribbean Basin and eastern Pacific Ocean. In September 2008, the frigate was sent to Haiti, carrying 350 tonnes of food and relief supplies after the nation had been hit by four hurricanes.

In July 2010, St. John's took part in the International Fleet Review at Halifax, Nova Scotia, where Queen Elizabeth II inspected a Guard of Honour on board to mark the centennial of the Royal Canadian Navy, and as part of Canada Day celebrations.

In August 2011, St. John's participated in the multinational six-week arctic sovereignty Operation Nanook. During the operation, the ship visited several northern communities and participated in search-and-rescue and disaster response exercises in company with HMCS Summerside and HMCS Moncton as well as American and Danish ships. St. John's deployed on Operation Caribbe from 3 October to 14 November 2011. During her deployment, she helped recover a drug cargo from a scuttled self-propelled semi-submersible (SPSS) vessel. The recovery effort included the deployment of the FBI laboratory's technical dive team, which conducted dive operations on the scuttled SPSS from United States Coast Guard cutter USCGC Cypress. More than 6,700 kg (14,800 lb) of cocaine was recovered from the vessel. The drugs, destined for distribution in North America, had an estimated street value of US$180 million. During this deployment, the Joint Interagency Task Force South based out of Key West, Florida, coordinated the joint efforts in allowing the US Coast Guard to make 38 arrests, and seized a total of 10,902 kg (24,035 lb) of cocaine and 1,144 kg (2,522 lb) of marijuana, equating to more than US$223 million.

On 8 May 2013, the ship suffered an oil spill while at dock in Halifax Harbour. During a transfer of fuel within the ship a leak was spotted and the transfer was halted, but not before a significant amount of oil entered the water. The Royal Canadian Navy was later fined $100,000 for the spill. In the summer of 2013 the crew of St. John's conducted a replacement in place of the crew of Toronto in Kuwait City, Kuwait. Toronto was in the middle of a deployment on Operation Artemis in support of CTF 150. St. John's completed her FELEX refit at Halifax Shipyards in October 2015.

=== Maritime security operations ===
The vessel deployed to the Mediterranean Sea in January 2017 to join Standing NATO Maritime Group 2. As part of the deployment, the frigate patrolled the Black Sea. The vessel returned to Canada on 17 July 2017 and was relieved by sister ship Charlottetown. In September 2017, St. John's was deployed the Caribbean Sea to bring relief aid to Turks and Caicos after Hurricane Irma swept through the region. St. John's provided aid to South Caicos. The ship was forced to leave the island after only a week due to the arrival of Hurricane Maria. Following the departure of the storm, St. John's was scheduled to return to South Caicos. However, the frigate was dispatched later that month to bring humanitarian aid to Dominica after Hurricane Maria devastated that island. Once power was restored to the island's airport, St. John's sailed for Canada, arriving 5 October.

St. John's departed Halifax on 16 January 2018 for deployment to the Mediterranean Sea as part of Operation Reassurance. The vessel relieved HMCS Charlottetown upon arrival. The frigate returned to Halifax on 23 July, having participated in naval exercises in the northern Atlantic Ocean and Baltic and Mediterranean Seas. The ship was relieved by HMCS Ville de Québec.
