= HMCS Ville de Québec (FFH 332) =

Royal Canadian Navy frigate

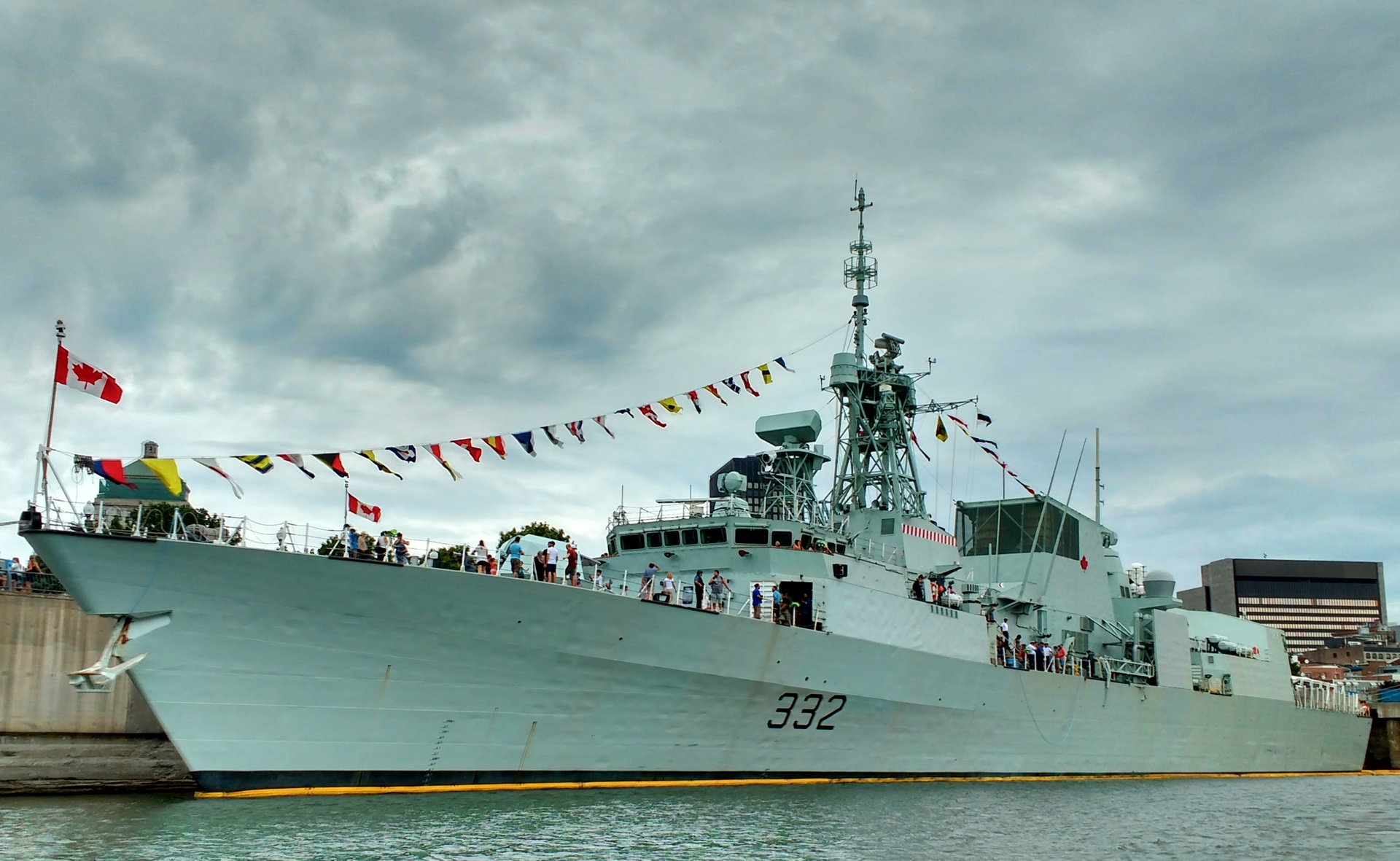
- HMCS Ville de Québec in September 2016

History

Canada
- Name: Ville de Québec
- Namesake: Quebec City, Quebec
- Builder: MIL-Davie Shipbuilding, Lévis-Lauzon
- Laid down: 16 December 1988
- Launched: 16 May 1991
- Commissioned: 11 July 1994
- Home port: CFB Halifax
- Identification: Hull number: FFH 332; MMSI number: 120477000
- Motto: Don de Dieu feray valoir (I will be worthy)
- Nickname(s): "VDQ"
- Honours and awards: Atlantic 1942–1944, Gulf of St. Lawrence 1942, Mediterranean 1943, English Channel 1944–1945
- Status: Ship in active service

General characteristics
- Class & type: Halifax-class frigate
- Displacement: 4,795 t (4,719 long tons) (standard); 5,032 t (4,953 long tons) (full load)
- Length: 134.2 m (440 ft 3 in)
- Beam: 16.5 m (54 ft 2 in)
- Draught: 7.1 m (23 ft 4 in)
- Propulsion: 2 × LM2500 gas turbines; 1 × SEMT Pielstick diesel engine
- Speed: 30 knots (56 km/h; 35 mph)
- Range: 9,500 nmi (17,600 km; 10,900 mi)
- Complement: 255 (including air detachment)
- Armament: Missiles; 2 × quad Mk 141 canisters for 8 × RGM-84 Harpoon block II AShM/LAM; 2 × 8-cell Mk 48 vertical launch system firing 16 × RIM-162 Evolved Sea Sparrow block II SAM/SSM; Guns; 1 × Bofors 57 mm Mk3 gun; 1 × Phalanx CIWS Mk 15 Mod 21 block 1B; 4 × .50-calibre M2HQ Mini Typhoon NRWS; Torpedoes; 2 × twin 324 mm (12.8 in) Mk 32 torpedo tubes for 24 × Honeywell Mk 46 Mod 5 torpedoes
- Aircraft carried: 1 × Sikorsky CH-148 Cyclone

HMCS Ville de Québec (FFH 332) (commonly referred to as VDQ) is a Halifax-class frigate that has served in the Canadian Forces and Royal Canadian Navy since 1993. Ville de Québec is the third vessel in her class which is the name for the Canadian Patrol Frigate Project. The frigate is the second Royal Canadian Navy ship to be named Ville de Québec. She is assigned to Maritime Forces Atlantic (MARLANT) and is homeported at CFB Halifax. The vessel serves on MARLANT missions protecting Canada's sovereignty in the Atlantic Ocean and enforcing Canadian laws in its territorial sea and exclusive economic zone.

== Description and design ==
The Halifax-class frigate design of which Ville de Québec belongs, was ordered by the Canadian Forces in 1977 as a replacement for the aging St. Laurent, Restigouche, Mackenzie, and Annapolis classes of destroyer escorts, which were all tasked with anti-submarine warfare. In July 1983, the federal government approved the budget for the design and construction of the first batch of six new frigates of which Ville de Québec was a part, out of twelve that were eventually built. To reflect the changing long-term strategy of the Navy during the 1980s and 1990s, the Halifax-class frigates was designed as a general purpose warship with particular focus on anti-submarine capabilities.

As built, the Halifax-class vessels displaced 4,750 long tons (4,830 t) and were 134.65 metres (441 ft 9 in) long overall and 124.49 metres (408 ft 5 in) between perpendiculars with a beam of 16.36 metres (53 ft 8 in) and a draught of 4.98 metres (16 ft 4 in). That made them slightly larger than the Iroquois-class destroyers. The vessels are propelled by two shafts with Escher Wyss controllable pitch propellers driven by a CODOG system of two General Electric LM2500 gas turbines, generating 47,500 shaft horsepower (35,400 kW) and one SEMT Pielstick 20 PA6 V 280 diesel engine, generating 8,800 shaft horsepower (6,600 kW).

This gives the frigates a maximum speed of 29 knots (54 km/h; 33 mph) and a range of 7,000 nautical miles (13,000 km; 8,100 mi) at 15 knots (28 km/h; 17 mph) while using their diesel engines. Using their gas turbines, the ships have a range of 3,930 nautical miles (7,280 km; 4,520 mi) at 18 knots (33 km/h; 21 mph). The Halifax class have a complement of 198 naval personnel of which 17 are officers and 17 aircrew of which 8 are officers.

=== Armament and aircraft ===
As built the Halifax-class vessels deployed the CH-124 Sea King helicopter, which acted in concert with shipboard sensors to seek out and destroy submarines at long distances from the ships. The ships have a helicopter deck fitted with a "bear trap" system allowing the launch and recovery of helicopters in up to sea state 6. The Halifax class also carries a close-in anti-submarine weapon in the form of the Mark 46 torpedo, launched from twin Mark 32 Mod 9 torpedo tubes in launcher compartments either side of the forward end of the helicopter hangar.

As built, the anti-shipping role is supported by the RGM-84 Harpoon Block 1C surface-to-surface missile, mounted in two quadruple launch tubes at the main deck level between the funnel and the helicopter hangar. For anti-aircraft self-defence the ships are armed with the Sea Sparrow vertical launch surface-to-air missile in two Mk 48 Mod 0 eight-cell launchers placed to port and starboard of the funnel. The vessels carry 16 missiles. A Raytheon/General Dynamics Phalanx Mark 15 Mod 21 Close-In Weapon System (CIWS) is mounted on top of the helicopter hangar for "last-ditch" defence against targets that evade the Sea Sparrow.

As built, the main gun on the forecastle is a 57 mm (2.2 in)/70 calibre Mark 2 gun from Bofors. (Note: The 70 calibre denotes the length of the gun. This means that the length of the gun barrel is 70 times the bore diameter.) The gun is capable of firing 2.4-kilogram (5.3 lb) shells at a rate of 220 rounds per minute at a range of more than 17 kilometres (11 mi).

=== Countermeasures and sensors ===
As built, the decoy system comprises two BAE Systems Shield Mark 2 decoy launchers which fire chaff to 2 kilometres (1.2 mi) and infrared rockets to 169 metres (185 yd) in distraction, confusion and centroid seduction modes. The torpedo decoy is the AN/SLQ-25A Nixie towed acoustic decoy from Argon ST. The ship's radar warning receiver, the CANEWS (Canadian Electronic Warfare System), SLQ-501, and the radar jammer, SLQ-505, were developed by Thorn and Lockheed Martin Canada.

Two Thales Nederland (formerly Signaal) SPG-503 (STIR 1.8) fire control radars are installed one on the roof of the bridge and one on the raised radar platform immediately forward of the helicopter hangar. The ship is also fitted with Raytheon AN/SPS-49(V)5 long-range active air search radar operating at C and D bands, Ericsson HC150 Sea Giraffe medium-range air and surface search radar operating at G and H bands, and Kelvin Hughes Type 1007 I-band navigation radar. The sonar suite includes the CANTASS Canadian Towed Array and GD-C AN/SQS-510 hull mounted sonar and incorporates an acoustic range prediction system. The sonobuoy processing system is the GD-C AN/UYS-503.

=== Modernization ===
The Halifax class underwent a modernization program, known as the Halifax Class Modernization (HCM) program, in order to update the frigates' capabilities in combatting modern smaller, faster and more mobile threats. This involved upgrading the command and control, radar, communications, electronic warfare and armament systems. Further improvements, such as modifying the vessel to accommodate the new Sikorsky CH-148 Cyclone helicopter and satellite links will be done separately from the main Frigate Equipment Life Extension (FELEX) program.

The FELEX program comprised upgrading the combat systems integration to CMS330. The SPS-49 2D long range air search radar was replaced by the Thales Nederland SMART-S Mk 2 E/F-band 3D surveillance radar, and the two STIR 1.8 fire control radars were replaced by a pair of Saab Ceros 200 re-control radars. A Telephonics IFF Mode 5/S interrogator was installed and the Elisra NS9003A-V2HC ESM system replaced the SLQ-501 CANEWS. An IBM multi-link (Link 11, Link 16 and Link 22 enabled) datalink processing system was installed along with two Raytheon Anschütz Pathfinder Mk II navigation radars. Furthermore, Rheinmetall's Multi-Ammunition Soft kill System (MASS), known as MASS DUERAS was introduced to replace the Plessey Shield decoy system. The existing 57 mm Mk 2 guns were upgraded to the Mk 3 standard and the Harpoon missiles were improved to Block II levels, the Phalanx was upgraded to Block 1B and the obsolete Sea Sparrow system was replaced by the Evolved Sea Sparrow Missile.

== Service history ==
Ville de Québec was laid down on 16 December 1988 at MIL Davie Shipbuilding, Lauzon, Quebec, and launched on 16 May 1991. The frigate was commissioned into the Canadian Forces on 14 July 1994 at Quebec City and carries the hull classification symbol FFH 332.

On 9 February 1995, the ship departed Halifax to participate in the NATO naval exercise "Strong Resolve" off Norway. In July, the ship deployed as part of STANAVFORLANT in the Adriatic Sea as part of the blockade force against Yugoslavia. The ship returned to Canada in January 1996. In 1998, Ville de Québec was among the Canadian naval assets that deployed in the search for Swissair Flight 111. In 1999, Ville de Québec joined STANAVFORLANT again for a three-month tour.

On 2 September 2005 Ville de Québec was deployed with a joint Canadian Forces Maritime Command/Canadian Coast Guard task force to the Gulf of Mexico to assist the United States with disaster relief efforts in Louisiana and Mississippi following Hurricane Katrina. 300 sailors deployed from the task force to Biloxi, Mississippi to assist in the cleanup and reconstruction and the ships of the task force delivered supplies to Pensacola, Florida.

In 2008, the frigate deployed as Canada's contribution to Standing NATO Maritime Group 1, NATO's fleet. On 6 August 2008, it was announced that Ville de Québec would redeploy and help in the protection of NATO relief for Somalia from pirates. The ship arrived on 19 August 2008, escorting World Food Program vessels from Mombasa, Kenya to Mogadishu.

During the summer of 2012, the frigate conducted an extensive tour of the Great Lakes, visiting 14 Great Lakes cities on both the Canadian and United States shores to mark the 200th anniversary of the War of 1812. Ville de Québec underwent her FELEX modernization beginning in October 2014 at Halifax, completing in December 2015. On 3 March 2016, while performing work up trials, the ship suffered a fire in one of her diesel generators while at HMC Dockyard in Halifax. The fire was suppressed and three crew members were sent to hospital as a precaution. The amount of damage was undeclared. The damage was repaired and the ship performed a series of port visits along the Great Lakes and Saint Lawrence Seaway in September 2016.

On 18 July 2018, Ville de Québec departed Halifax to join Canada's Operation Reassurance in the Mediterranean and Black Seas, replacing sister ship HMCS St. John's. Ville de Québec's departure also marked the first international deployment of the Sikorsky CH-148 Cyclone helicopter. In October 2018, Ville de Québec was among the Canadian ships sent to participate in the large NATO exercise Trident Juncture in the North Atlantic and Baltic Seas. The ship then deployed to the Mediterranean Sea as part of Operation Reassurance, joining Standing NATO Maritime Group 2 and visiting Israel and Croatia. The frigate returned to Canada on 21 January 2019.

In August 2020, Ville de Québec was deployed to the Arctic as part of Operation Nanook along with MV Asterix and HMCS Glace Bay from the Royal Canadian Navy and warships from the Danish, French, U.S. navies. In 2025, the frigate joined the Royal Navy's carrier strike group as part of Operation HIGHMAST in a deployment to the Indo-Pacific region.

In early September 2025 the ship was involved in an international incident while participating in "freedom of navigation exercises" alongside HMAS Brisbane. The two ships were followed by a destroyer from the Chinese People's Liberation Army Navy (PLAN). A PLAN spokesperson accused the Australian and Canadian ships of "trouble-making and provocation". Western nations consider the Taiwan adjacent waterway to be international waters while China considers the area to be part of their own territory.

== See also ==
- Canadian response to Hurricane Katrina
