= HMCS Moncton (K139) =

Flower-class corvette

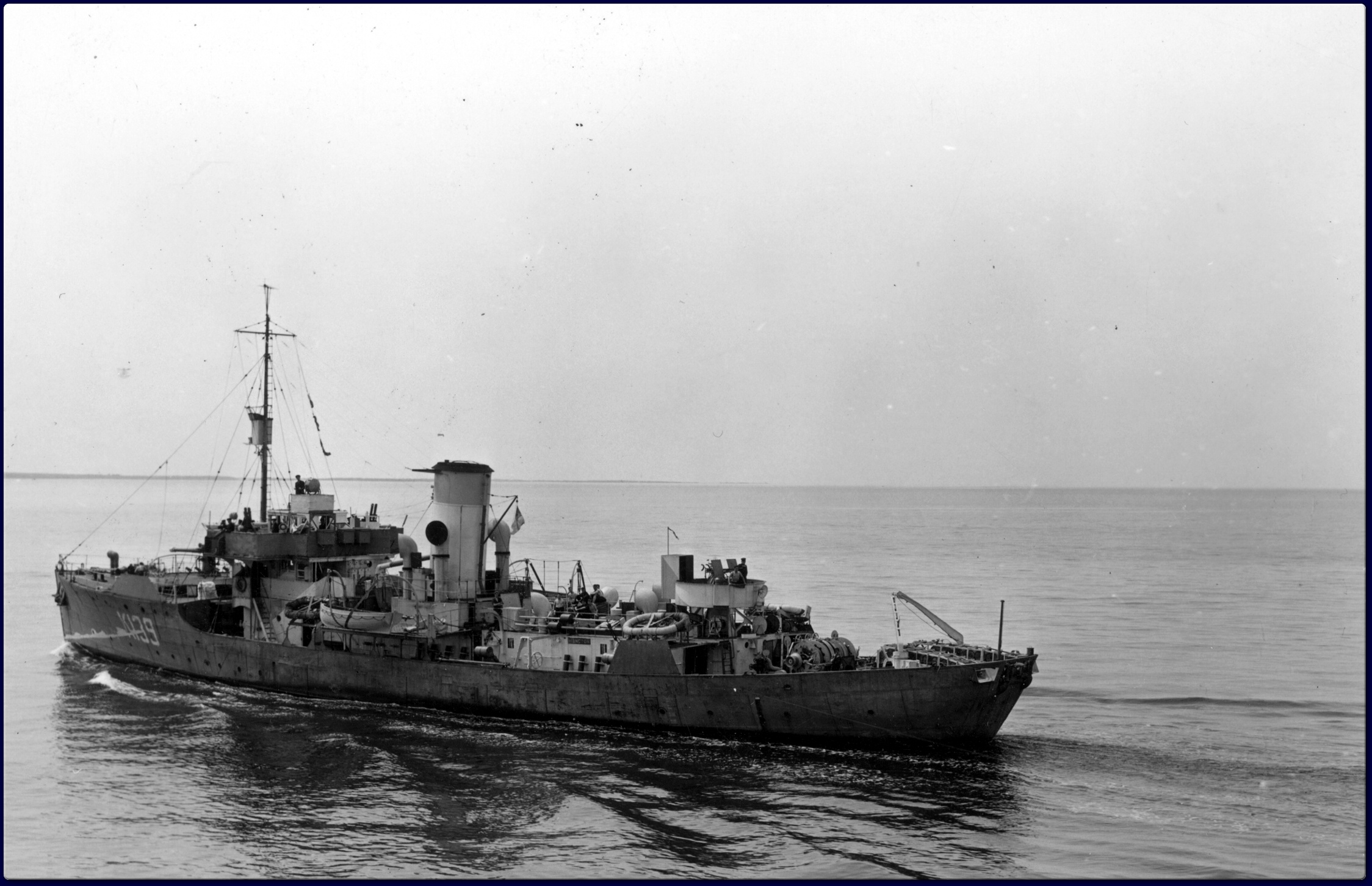
- HMCS Moncton, circa 1942

History

Canada
- Name: Moncton
- Namesake: Moncton, New Brunswick
- Ordered: 24 January 1940
- Builder: Saint John Dry Dock & Shipbuilding Co. Ltd., Saint John
- Laid down: 17 December 1940
- Launched: 11 August 1941
- Commissioned: 24 April 1942
- Decommissioned: paid off 12 December 1945
- Identification: Pennant number: K139
- Motto: Resurgam; (Latin:"I shall rise again")
- Honours and awards: Atlantic, 1942-1943
- Fate: Sold in 1955 to the Netherlands as mercantile Willem Vinke. Scrapped in 1966 at Santander.

General characteristics
- Class & type: Flower-class corvette (original)
- Displacement: 925 long tons (940 t; 1,036 short tons)
- Length: 205 ft (62.48 m)o/a
- Beam: 33 ft (10.06 m)
- Draught: 11.5 ft (3.51 m)
- Installed power: 2 × fire tube Scotch boilers; 2,750 ihp (2,050 kW)
- Propulsion: single shaft; 1 × 4-cycle triple-expansion reciprocating steam engine
- Speed: 16 knots (29.6 km/h)
- Range: 3,500 nautical miles (6,482 km) at 12 knots (22.2 km/h)
- Complement: 85
- Sensors & processing systems: 1 × SW1C or 2C radar; 1 × Type 123A or Type 127DV sonar
- Armament: 1 × BL 4 in (102 mm) Mk.IX gun; 2 × .50 cal machine gun (twin); 2 × Lewis .303 cal machine gun (twin); 2 × Mk.II depth charge throwers; 2 × depth charge rails with 40 depth charges; originally fitted with minesweeping gear, later removed

HMCS Moncton was a Flower-class corvette that served in the Royal Canadian Navy during the Second World War. She served on both coasts of Canada. She is named after Moncton, New Brunswick.

== Background ==
Flower-class corvettes like Moncton serving with the Royal Canadian Navy (RCN) during the Second World War were different from earlier and more traditional sail-driven corvettes. The "corvette" designation was created by the French as a class of small warships; the Royal Navy borrowed the term for a period but discontinued its use in 1877. During the hurried preparations for war in the late 1930s, Winston Churchill reactivated the corvette class, needing a name for smaller ships used in an escort capacity, in this case based on a whaling ship design. The generic name "flower" was used to designate the class of these ships, which – in the Royal Navy – were named after flowering plants.

Corvettes commissioned by the Royal Canadian Navy during the Second World War were named after communities for the most part, to better represent the people who took part in building them. This idea was put forth by Admiral Percy W. Nelles. Sponsors were commonly associated with the community for which the ship was named. Royal Navy corvettes were designed as open sea escorts, while Canadian corvettes were developed for coastal auxiliary roles which was exemplified by their minesweeping gear. Eventually the Canadian corvettes would be modified to allow them to perform better on the open seas.

== Construction ==
She was ordered on 24 January 1940 as part of the 1939-1940 Flower-class building program. She was laid down bym St. John Dry Dock & Shipbuilding Co. Ltd. at Saint John on 17 December 1940 and was launched on 11 August 1941. She commissioned into the RCN on 24 April 1942 at Saint John. Moncton was the last of the RCN's original 64 Flower-class orders to be completed and her construction had been significantly delayed due to heavy demands on her builder for priority repair work on war-damaged ships.

== Wartime service ==
Following her commissioning, Moncton sailed to Halifax and was assigned to Atlantic Coast Command (AT) but unallocated as she was fitting out and performing sea trials for the remainder of April. In May she began work-ups with her new crew out of Halifax and she joined the RCN's Atlantic Fleet on 12 May 1942. Another highlight for Moncton in 1942 was conducting training with (an as yet anonymous) British submarine off Halifax.

From June 1942 to June 1943, Moncton was tasked to Western Local Escort Force (WLEF) for convoy escort operations. In June 1943, WLEF was divided into separate escort groups and Moncton was tasked to EG W5 (HQ in Halifax) during June–July. Moncton collided with merchant Jamaica Producer on 28 July 1943. From August–September 1943 Moncton underwent repairs at Dartmouth Marine Slips, Dartmouth. She returned to EG W5 and operated in convoy escort operations from October–December.

Moncton was transferred to the RCN's Pacific Fleet in January 1944 and departed for Esquimalt, via Guantánamo Bay, Cristóbal, Balboa and San Pedro. Upon her arrival, she was tasked to the Esquimalt Force (unallocated) and underwent an extensive refit at Vancouver from 5 May - 7 July 1944 where her forecastle was extended and she was brought into line with the modified Flower-class design. From July 1944 to December 1945 she was tasked to Pacific Coast Command (unallocated).

Following V-J Day, she was placed in reserve status at Esquimalt and decommissioned from the RCN on 12 December 1945, the last of the first batch of Flower class corvettes to serve the Navy as an active warship.

=== Trans-Atlantic convoys escorted ===
| Convoy | Escort Group | Dates | Notes |
|---|---|---|---|
| SC.87 | WLEF | June 12–15, 1942 | 42 ships escorted without loss from Sydney, NS to Liverpool UK |
| ON.103 | WLEF | June 12–26, 1942 | 52 ships escorted from Liverpool UK to Boston USA, Moncton joined the escort on June 21 |
| SC.90 | WLEF | July 3–16, 1942 | 34 ships escorted from Sydney NS to Liverpool UK, Moncton on escort from July 3–6 |
| ON.109 | WLEF | July 3–18, 1942 | 28 ships escorted from Liverpool UK to Halifax NS, Moncton joined the escort from July 11–16 |
| SC.93 | WLEF | July 24–August 7, 1942 | 45 ships escorted from Sydney NS to Liverpool UK, Moncton joined escort from July 24–26 |
| ON.114 | WLEF | July 19–dispersal, 1942 | 32 ships escorted from Liverpool UK to dispersal. Moncton joined escort from July 30 to August 8 for Halifax bound ships |
| BX.32? | WLEF | August 5–8, 1942 | Boston USA to Halifax NS. Conflicting information, though Moncton is not listed in Arnold Hague's database for this convoy, escort only possible if the remainder of ON.114 joined BX.32 before arrival in Halifax. |
| BX.32B | n/a | n/a | Convoy itself is missing from Arnold Hague's database |
| BX.35 | WLEF | August 26–28, 1942 | Boston USA to Halifax NS |
| HX.203 | WLEF | August 16–28, 1942 | 39 ships escorted Halifax NS to Liverpool UK |

=== Convoy list ===
This is a list of the convoys that Moncton escorted:

- Convoy ON.114 (Jul 1942: Liverpool - Dispersed)
- Convoy BX.32 (Aug 1942: Boston - Halifax)
- Convoy BX.32B (Aug 1942: Boston - Halifax)
- Convoy BX.35 (Aug 1942: Boston - Halifax)
- Convoy HX.203 (Aug 1942: Halifax - Liverpool)
- Convoy ON.121 (12 Aug 1942: Liverpool - Dispersed)
- Convoy BX.35B (Aug 1942: Boston - Halifax)
- Convoy ON.127 (Sep 1942: Liverpool - NYC)
- Convoy SC.99 (Sep 1942: Halifax - Liverpool)
- Convoy ON.128 (Sep 1942: Liverpool - NYC)
- Convoy SC.103 (Sep 1942: NYC - Liverpool)
- Convoy ON.135 (Oct 1942: Liverpool - NYC)
- Convoy ON.137 (Oct 1942: Liverpool - NYC)
- Convoy ON.142 (Oct 1942: Liverpool - NYC)
- Convoy SC.108 (Nov 1942: NYC - Liverpool)
- Convoy HX.214 (Nov 1942: NYC - Liverpool)
- Convoy ON.145 (Nov 1942: Liverpool - NYC)
- Convoy ON.150 (Dec 1942: Liverpool - NYC)
- Convoy SC.112 (Dec 1942: NYC - Liverpool)
- Convoy HX.218 (Dec 1942: NYC - Liverpool)
- Convoy HX.221 (Dec 1942: NYC - Liverpool)
- Convoy HX.222 (Jan 1943: NYC - Liverpool)
- Convoy ON.158 (Jan 1943: Liverpool - NYC)
- Convoy ON.160 (Jan 1943: Liverpool - NYC)
- Convoy HX.226 (Feb 1943: NYC - Liverpool)
- Convoy ON.167 (Feb 1943: Liverpool - NYC)
- Convoy SC.120 (Feb 1943: NYC - Liverpool)
- Convoy ON.174 (Mar 1943: Liverpool - NYC)
- Convoy SC.124 (Mar 1943: NYC - Liverpool)
- Convoy BX.44 (Apr 1943: Boston - Halifax)
- Convoy BX.46 (Apr 1943: Boston - Halifax)
- Convoy XB.48 (Apr 1943: Halifax - Boston)
- Convoy XB.44 (Apr 1943: Halifax - Boston)
- Convoy XB.46 (Apr 1943: Halifax - Boston)
- Convoy BX.44 (Apr 1943: Boston - Halifax)
- Convoy BX.46 (Apr 1943: Boston - Halifax)
- Convoy XB.44 (Apr 1943: Halifax - Boston)
- Convoy XB.46 (Apr 1943: Halifax - Boston)
- Convoy BX.48 (May 1943: Boston - Halifax)
- Convoy XB.55 (May 1943: Halifax - Boston)
- Convoy BX.48 (May 1943: Boston - Halifax)
- Convoy ONS.7 (May 1943: Liverpool - Halifax)
- Convoy SC.130 (May 1943: Halifax - Liverpool)
- Convoy ON.190 (Jun 1943: Liverpool - NYC)
- Convoy ONS.10 (Jun 1943: Liverpool - Halifax)
- Convoy SC.133 (Jun 1943: Halifax - Liverpool)
- Convoy XB.60 (Jun 1943: Halifax - Cape Cod Canal)
- Convoy ON.193 (Jul 1943: Liverpool - NYC)
- Convoy HX.248 (Jul 1943: NYC - Liverpool)
- Convoy ON.210 (Nov 1943: Liverpool - NYC)
- Convoy HX.269 (Dec 1943: NYC - Liverpool)
- Convoy ON.214 (Dec 1943: Liverpool - NYC)

The information for the convoys was obtained from two of the links below:
www.convoyweb.org.uk/ and www.warsailors.com

== Civilian service ==
Moncton was sold by Crown Assets in 1955 into mercantile service and was re-flagged under the Netherlands as the whaling ship Willem Vinke, 718 GRT. She was scrapped September in 1966 at Santander, Cantabria, Spain by Recuparciones Submarinas S.A.
