= HMCS Toronto (FFH 333) =

Royal Canadian Navy frigate

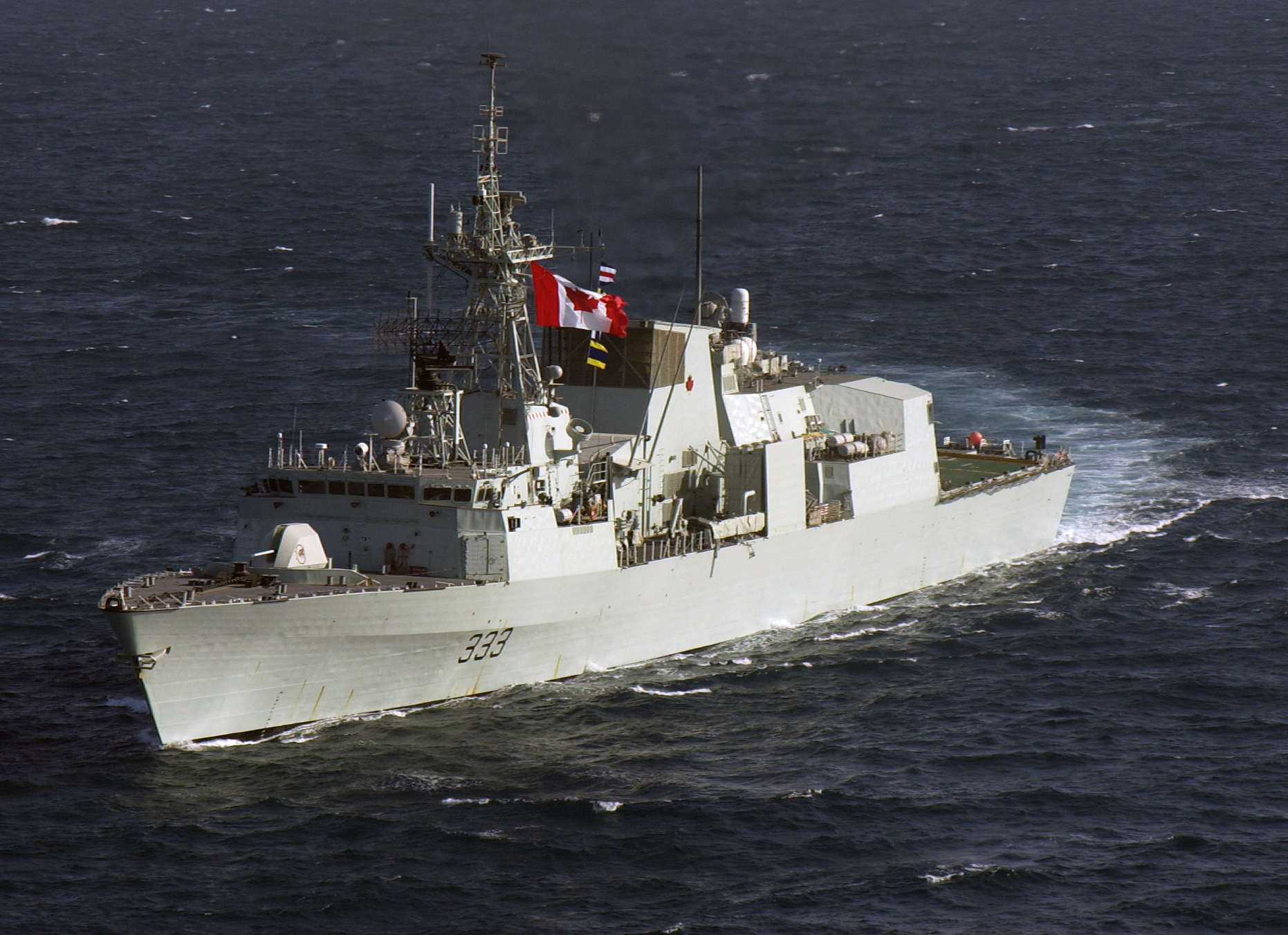
- HMCS Toronto

History

Canada
- Name: Toronto
- Namesake: Toronto, Ontario
- Builder: Saint John Shipbuilding Ltd., Saint John
- Laid down: 22 April 1989
- Launched: 18 December 1990
- Commissioned: 29 July 1993
- Home port: CFB Halifax
- Identification: MMSI number: 316135000; Callsign: CGAD
- Motto: "Excellence with Vigour"
- Honours and awards: Gulf of St Lawrence 1944, Arabian Sea; Meritorious Unit Commendation (United States)
- Status: In active service
- Badge: Azure, a mural crown argent, masoned sable, surmounted by a beaver proper holding in the dexter paw, a marlin spike or.

General characteristics
- Class & type: Halifax-class frigate
- Displacement: 3,995 tonnes (light); 4,795 tonnes (operational); 5,032 tonnes (deep load)
- Length: 134.2 m (440 ft)
- Beam: 16.5 m (54 ft)
- Draught: 7.1 m (23 ft)
- Propulsion: 2 × LM2500 gas turbines; 1 × SEMT Pielstick diesel engine
- Speed: 29 knots (54 km/h; 33 mph)
- Range: 9,500 nmi (17,600 km; 10,900 mi)
- Complement: 255 (including air detachment)
- Armament: 24 × Honeywell Mk 46 torpedoes; 16 × Evolved Sea-Sparrow SAM; 8 × RGM-84 Harpoon SSM; 1 × 57 mm Bofors Mk3 gun; 1 × 20 mm Vulcan Phalanx CIWS; 6 × .50 caliber machine guns
- Aircraft carried: 1 × Sikorsky CH-148 Cyclone
- Aviation facilities: Hangar and flight deck

HMCS Toronto (FFH 333) is a Halifax-class frigate that has served in the Canadian Forces since 1993. Toronto is the fourth ship in her class which is the name for the Canadian Patrol Frigate Project. She is the second RCN ship to be named for Canada's largest city. When not on operations, she is assigned to Maritime Forces Atlantic (MARLANT) and is based at CFB Halifax. Toronto serves on MARLANT missions protecting Canada's sovereignty in the Atlantic Ocean and enforcing Canadian laws in its territorial sea and exclusive economic zone.

== Description and design ==
The Halifax-class frigate design of which Toronto belongs, was ordered by the Canadian Forces in 1977 as a replacement for the aging St. Laurent, Restigouche, Mackenzie, and Annapolis classes of destroyer escorts, which were all tasked with anti-submarine warfare. In July 1983, the federal government approved the budget for the design and construction of the first batch of six new frigates of which Toronto was a part, out of twelve that were eventually built. To reflect the changing long-term strategy of the Navy during the 1980s and 1990s, the Halifax-class frigates was designed as a general purpose warship with particular focus on anti-submarine capabilities.

As built, the Halifax-class vessels displaced 4,750 long tons (4,830 t) and were 134.65 metres (441 ft 9 in) long overall and 124.49 metres (408 ft 5 in) between perpendiculars with a beam of 16.36 metres (53 ft 8 in) and a draught of 4.98 metres (16 ft 4 in). That made them slightly larger than the Iroquois-class destroyers. The vessels are propelled by two shafts with Escher Wyss controllable pitch propellers driven by a CODOG system of two General Electric LM2500 gas turbines, generating 47,500 shaft horsepower (35,400 kW) and one SEMT Pielstick 20 PA6 V 280 diesel engine, generating 8,800 shaft horsepower (6,600 kW).

This gives the frigates a maximum speed of 29 knots (54 km/h; 33 mph) and a range of 7,000 nautical miles (13,000 km; 8,100 mi) at 15 knots (28 km/h; 17 mph) while using their diesel engines. Using their gas turbines, the ships have a range of 3,930 nautical miles (7,280 km; 4,520 mi) at 18 knots (33 km/h; 21 mph). The Halifax class have a complement of 198 naval personnel of which 17 are officers and 17 aircrew of which 8 are officers.

=== Armament and aircraft ===
As built the Halifax-class vessels deployed the CH-124 Sea King helicopter, which acted in concert with shipboard sensors to seek out and destroy submarines at long distances from the ships. The ships have a helicopter deck fitted with a "bear trap" system allowing the launch and recovery of helicopters in up to sea state 6. The Halifax class also carries a close-in anti-submarine weapon in the form of the Mark 46 torpedo, launched from twin Mark 32 Mod 9 torpedo tubes in launcher compartments either side of the forward end of the helicopter hangar.

As built, the anti-shipping role is supported by the RGM-84 Harpoon Block 1C surface-to-surface missile, mounted in two quadruple launch tubes at the main deck level between the funnel and the helicopter hangar. For anti-aircraft self-defence the ships are armed with the Sea Sparrow vertical launch surface-to-air missile in two Mk 48 Mod 0 eight-cell launchers placed to port and starboard of the funnel. The vessels carry 16 missiles. A Raytheon/General Dynamics Phalanx Mark 15 Mod 21 Close-In Weapon System (CIWS) is mounted on top of the helicopter hangar for "last-ditch" defence against targets that evade the Sea Sparrow.

As built, the main gun on the forecastle is a 57 mm (2.2 in)/70 calibre Mark 2 gun from Bofors. (Note: The 70 calibre denotes the length of the gun. This means that the length of the gun barrel is 70 times the bore diameter.) The gun is capable of firing 2.4-kilogram (5.3 lb) shells at a rate of 220 rounds per minute at a range of more than 17 kilometres (11 mi).

=== Countermeasures and sensors ===
As built, the decoy system comprises Two BAE Systems Shield Mark 2 decoy launchers which fire chaff to 2 kilometres (1.2 mi) and infrared rockets to 169 metres (185 yd) in distraction, confusion and centroid seduction modes. The torpedo decoy is the AN/SLQ-25A Nixie towed acoustic decoy from Argon ST. The ship's radar warning receiver, the CANEWS (Canadian Electronic Warfare System), SLQ-501, and the radar jammer, SLQ-505, were developed by Thorn and Lockheed Martin Canada.

Two Thales Nederland (formerly Signaal) SPG-503 (STIR 1.8) fire control radars are installed one on the roof of the bridge and one on the raised radar platform immediately forward of the helicopter hangar. The ship is also fitted with Raytheon AN/SPS-49(V)5 long-range active air search radar operating at C and D bands, Ericsson HC150 Sea Giraffe medium-range air and surface search radar operating at G and H bands, and Kelvin Hughes Type 1007 I-band navigation radar. The sonar suite includes the CANTASS Canadian Towed Array and GD-C AN/SQS-510 hull mounted sonar and incorporates an acoustic range prediction system. The sonobuoy processing system is the GD-C AN/UYS-503.

=== Modernization ===
The Halifax class underwent a modernization program, known as the Halifax Class Modernization (HCM) program, in order to update the frigates' capabilities in combatting modern smaller, faster and more mobile threats. This involved upgrading the command and control, radar, communications, electronic warfare and armament systems. Further improvements, such as modifying the vessel to accommodate the new Sikorsky CH-148 Cyclone helicopter and satellite links will be done separately from the main Frigate Equipment Life Extension (FELEX) program.

The FELEX program comprised upgrading the combat systems integration to CMS330. The SPS-49 2D long-range air search radar was replaced by the Thales Nederland SMART-S Mk 2 E/F-band 3D surveillance radar, and the two STIR 1.8 fire-control radars were replaced by a pair of Saab Ceros 200 recontrol radars. A Telephonics IFF Mode 5/S interrogator was installed and the Elisra NS9003A-V2HC ESM system replaced the SLQ-501 CANEWS. An IBM multi-link (Link 11, Link 16 and Link 22 enabled) datalink processing system was installed along with two Raytheon Anschütz Pathfinder Mk II navigation radars. Furthermore, Rheinmetall's Multi Ammunition Softkill System (MASS), known as MASS DUERAS, was introduced to replace the Plessey Shield decoy system. The existing 57 mm Mk 2 guns were upgraded to the Mk 3 standard, the Harpoon missiles were improved to Block II levels, the Phalanx was upgraded to Block 1B, and the obsolete Sea Sparrow system was replaced by the Evolved Sea Sparrow Missile.

== Service history ==
Toronto was laid down on 22 April 1989 by Saint John Shipbuilding Ltd. at Saint John, New Brunswick, and launched on 18 December 1990. The frigate was commissioned into the Canadian Forces on 29 July 1993 at Toronto, Ontario, and carries the hull classification symbol FFH 333.

In 1994, Toronto deployed to the Adriatic Sea in support of the NATO blockade of Yugoslavia. In 1995, with Halifax and Terra Nova, Toronto sailed to Europe making a series of port visits in commemoration of the end of the Second World War in Europe. The same year, the ship took part in the NATO naval exercise Linked Seas off Portugal. In 1996, Toronto sailed through the St. Lawrence Seaway and the Great Lakes making several port visits.

In 1998, Toronto joined the NATO fleet STANAVFORLANT in January. On 10 February, the ship was redeployed to the Persian Gulf to assist in the enforcement of sanctions against Iraq. During the ship's deployment, the frigate served with a United States Navy fleet. The ship returned to Canada on 16 June. On 5 December, Toronto sailed to the Middle East as part of Operation Apollo in the War in Afghanistan. The ship returned to Canada on 27 May 2002. From January to July 2004, Toronto took part in Operation Altair, operating with the USS George Washington Carrier Strike Group as part of a U.S.-led coalition in Operation Enduring Freedom. In summer 2005, Toronto performed another tour of the Great Lakes.

On 6 September 2005, Toronto, with Athabaskan, St. John's and the Canadian Coast Guard vessel Sir William Alexander, were dispatched to the Gulf of Mexico to aid the United States in their response to the flooding of New Orleans by Hurricane Katrina. In 2008, Toronto with Shawinigan and the Canadian Coast Guard vessel Pierre Radisson made an Arctic patrol through Frobisher Bay as part of Operation Nanook. In 2009, Toronto deployed to the Caribbean Sea to perform drug-smuggling interdiction duties as part of Operation Caribbe. The ship returned to the Caribbean in 2011 as part of Operation Caribbe.

Toronto participated in Operation Artemis, commencing her first rotation (ROTO 2) in January 2013 and finishing in February 2014 (which included a crew swap in July 2013 [the first crew swap in RCN history since 1991]).

While relieving Regina in the Mediterranean Sea as part of Standing NATO Maritime Group 2, Toronto was reassigned to the Black Sea for Operation Reassurance in response to Russian intervention in Central and Eastern Europe. Toronto led Task Unit 2 (TU.02) and worked in concert with Spanish Navy frigate Almirante Juan de Borbón, and operated with Romanian Navy frigate Regele Ferdinand and United States Navy destroyer USS Ross as well as other vessels from Bulgaria, Georgia, Turkey, and Ukraine.

On 8 September 2014, Toronto was circled by two Russian Su-24 attack aircraft and a Russian surveillance plane in a provocative manner. In November 2014, six members of the crew helped fight a fire while on shore leave in Antalya, Turkey. While in the Mediterranean Sea, Toronto suffered a fire in its auxiliary machinery room on 25 December 2014. The fire was extinguished and all personnel affected by the smoke were treated and released. During the frigate's deployment, Toronto participated in three naval exercises and led Task Unit 2 while operating in the Black Sea. Fredericton relieved the ship in January 2015.

Toronto was the last ship of the class to complete her FELEX refit, which was performed at Irving Shipyards in Halifax. The vessel was returned to the Royal Canadian Navy on 29 November 2016 to begin sea trials. The vessel was not expected to be operational until 2017–18. In January 2018, Toronto trained with the new Resolve-class auxiliary vessel, MV Asterix off the coast of Nova Scotia.

In October, Toronto was deployed to European waters. During a series of exercises in UK waters, the frigate developed a significant electrical problem that caused a loss of power to the ship. Power was later restored and Toronto was ordered to Belfast for repairs. As the frigate was docking in Belfast, a small fire began in the starboard gas turbine enclosure in the forward engine room, which was quickly extinguished by the crew. This marked the second such fire in days aboard Halifax-class frigates, the first aboard Halifax. The ship returned to Canada. On 19 January 2019, Toronto departed Halifax for the Mediterranean Sea as part of Operation Reassurance. The frigate sailed into the Black Sea and visited Odesa, Ukraine.

Toronto returned to Halifax on 4 August 2019. On 22 August 2019, a fire broke out aboard Toronto while the ship was at dock in Halifax undergoing routine maintenance. The fire broke out at roughly 6:50 pm and was extinguished within 20 minutes. No one was injured.

== Images ==
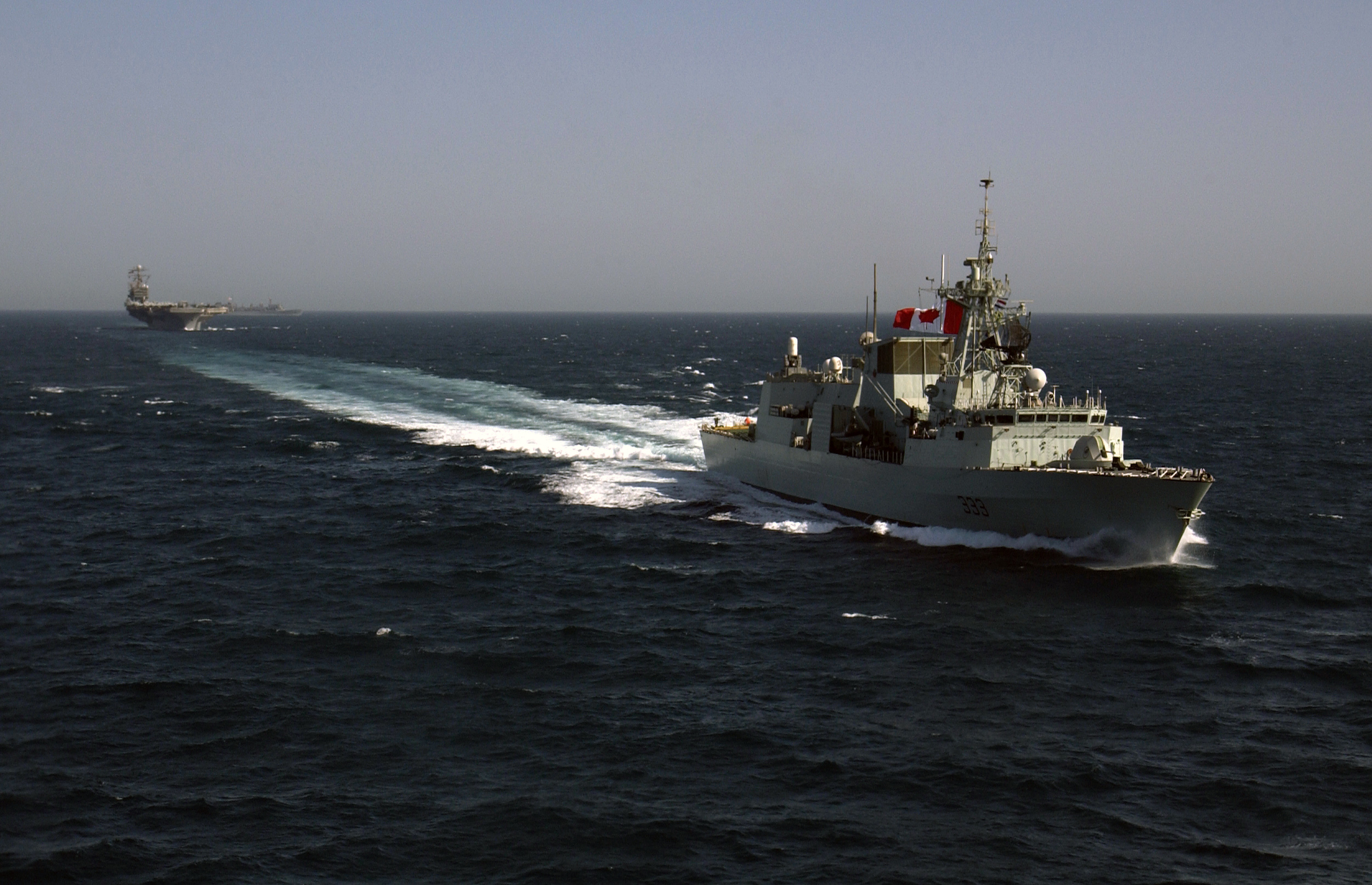

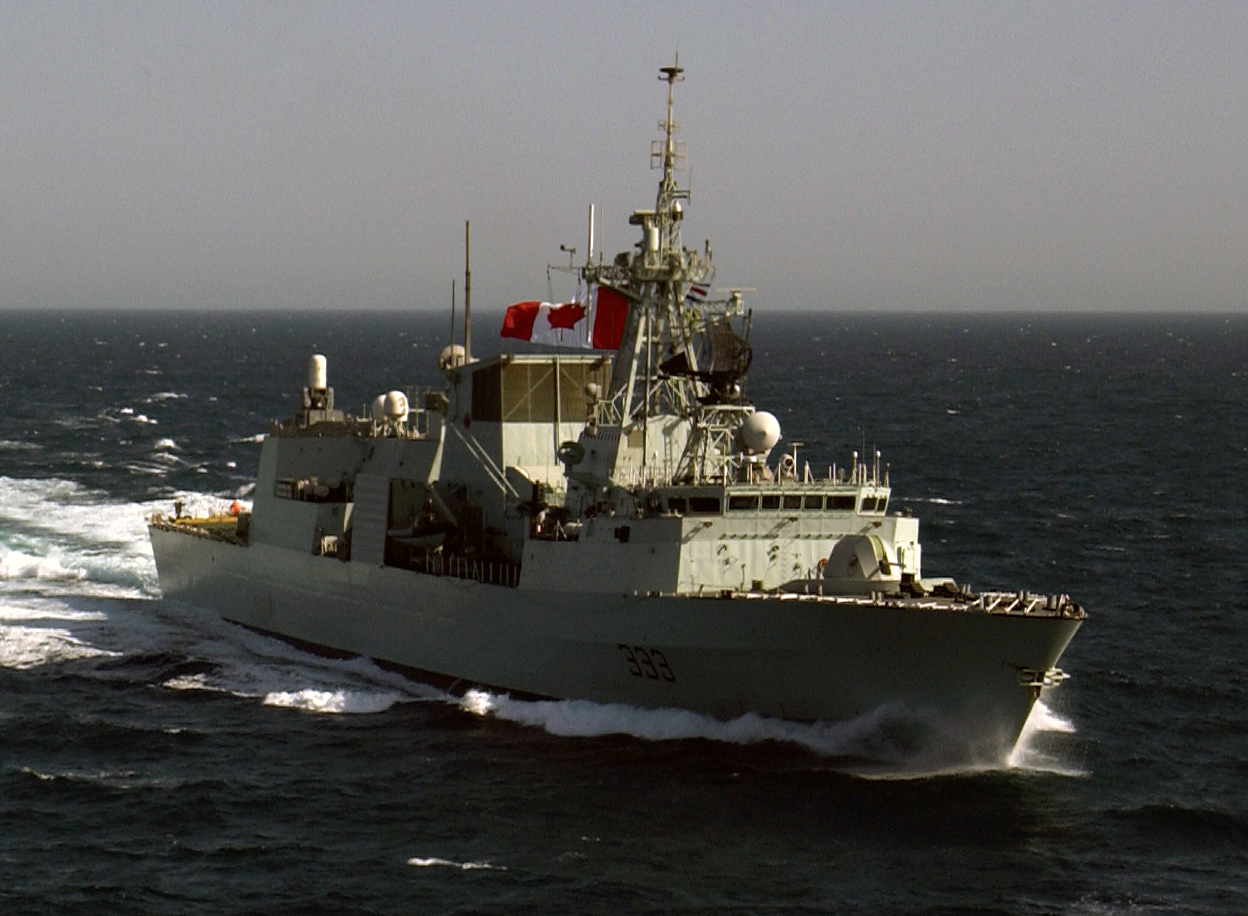

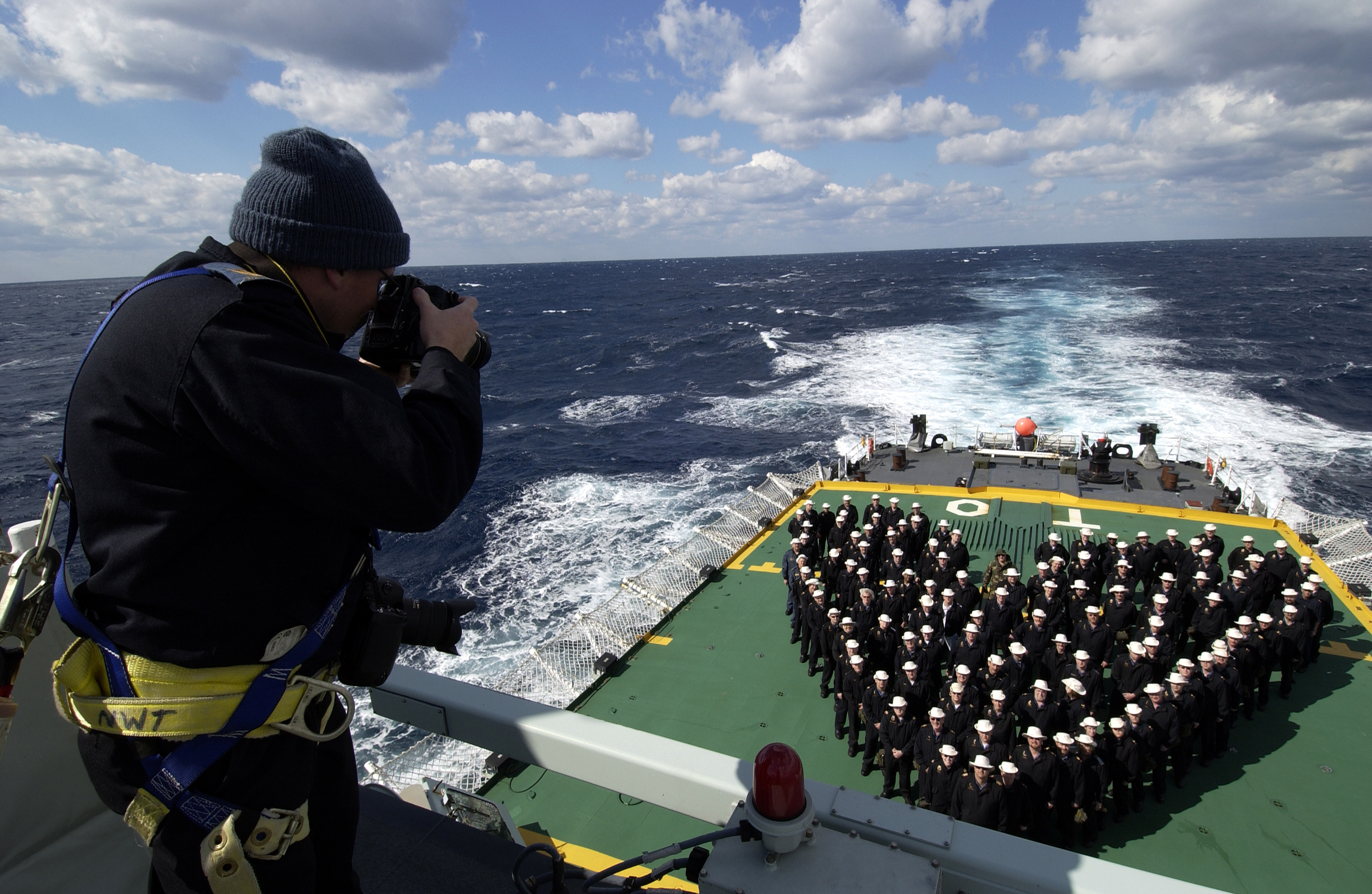

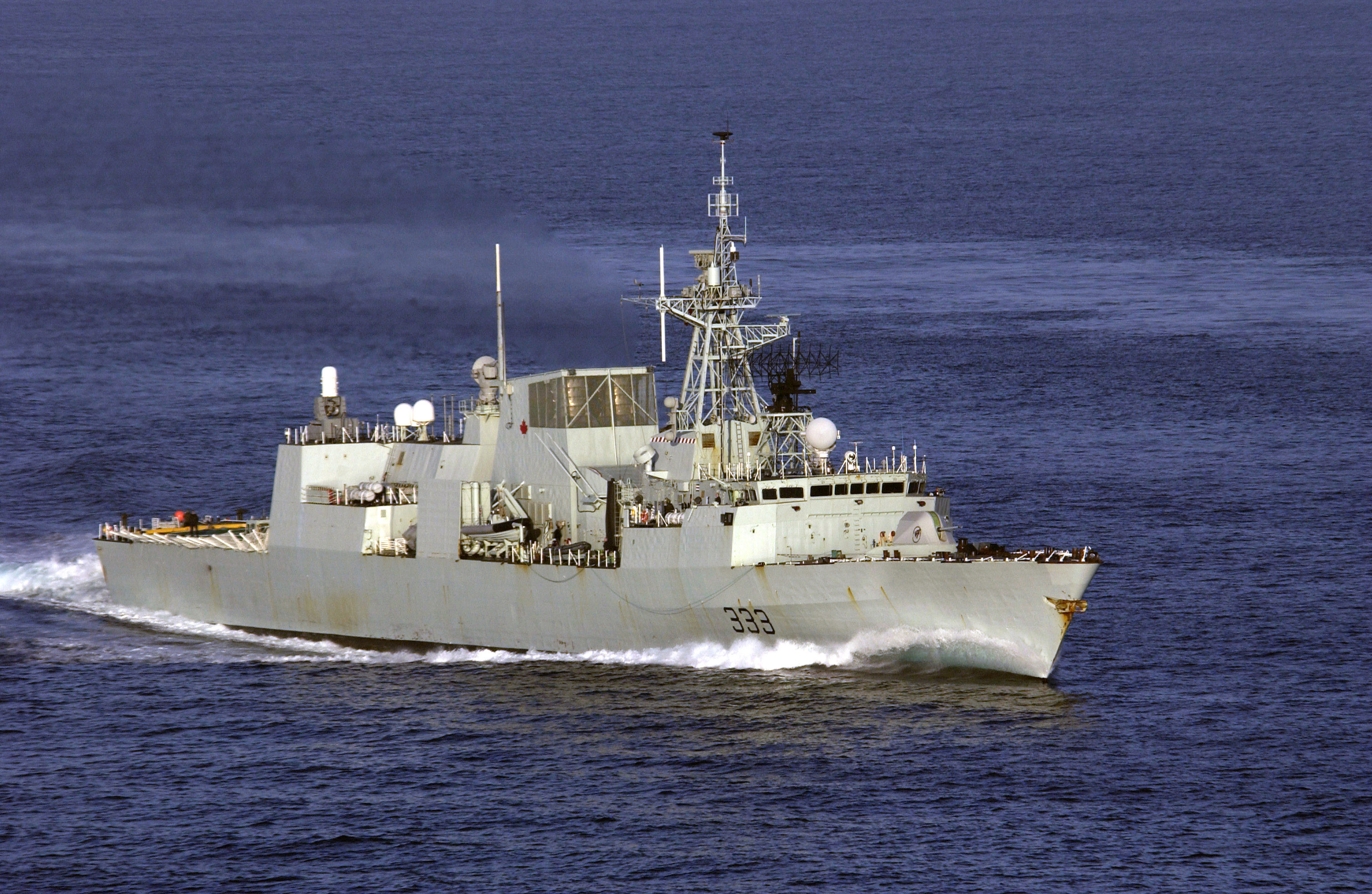

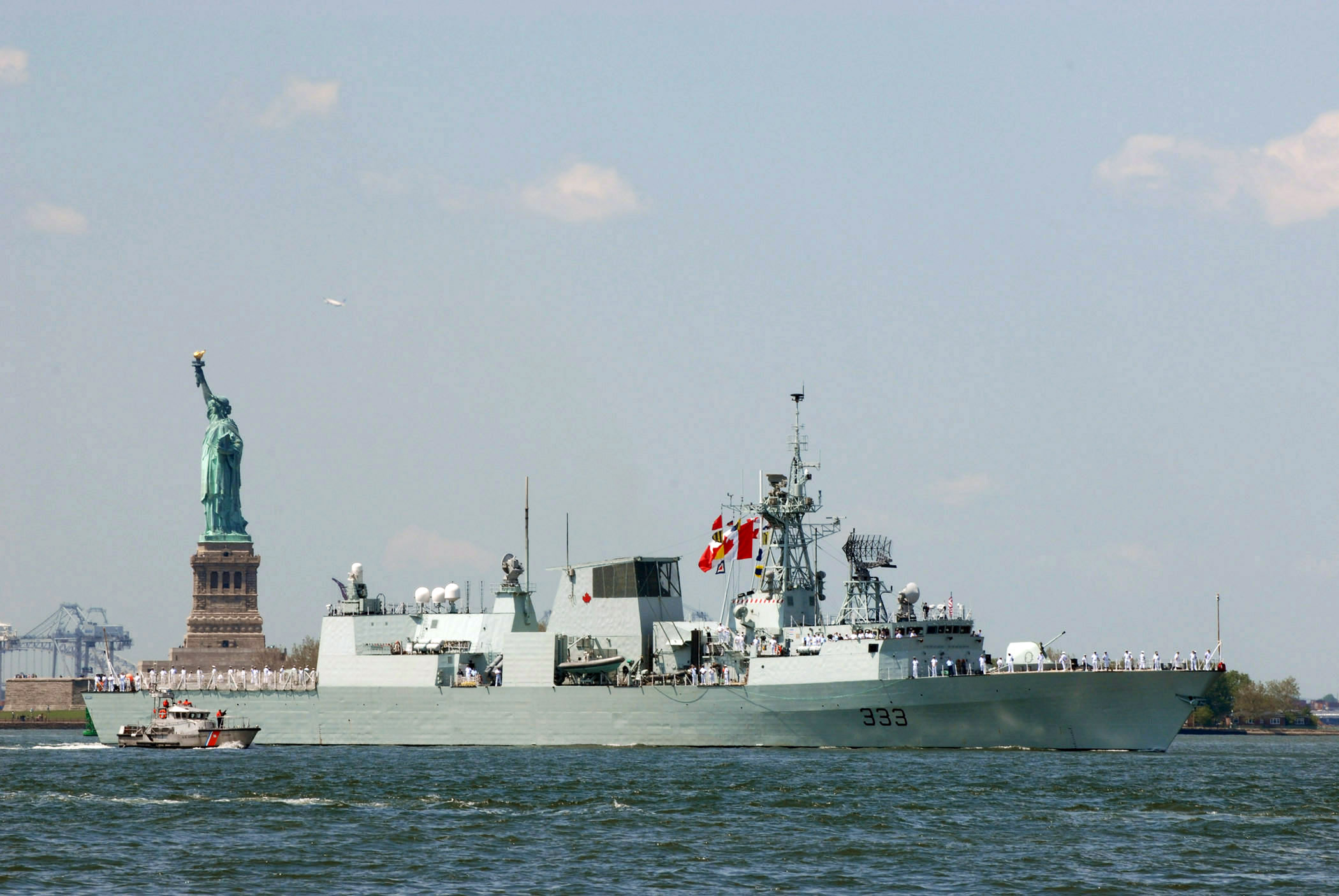

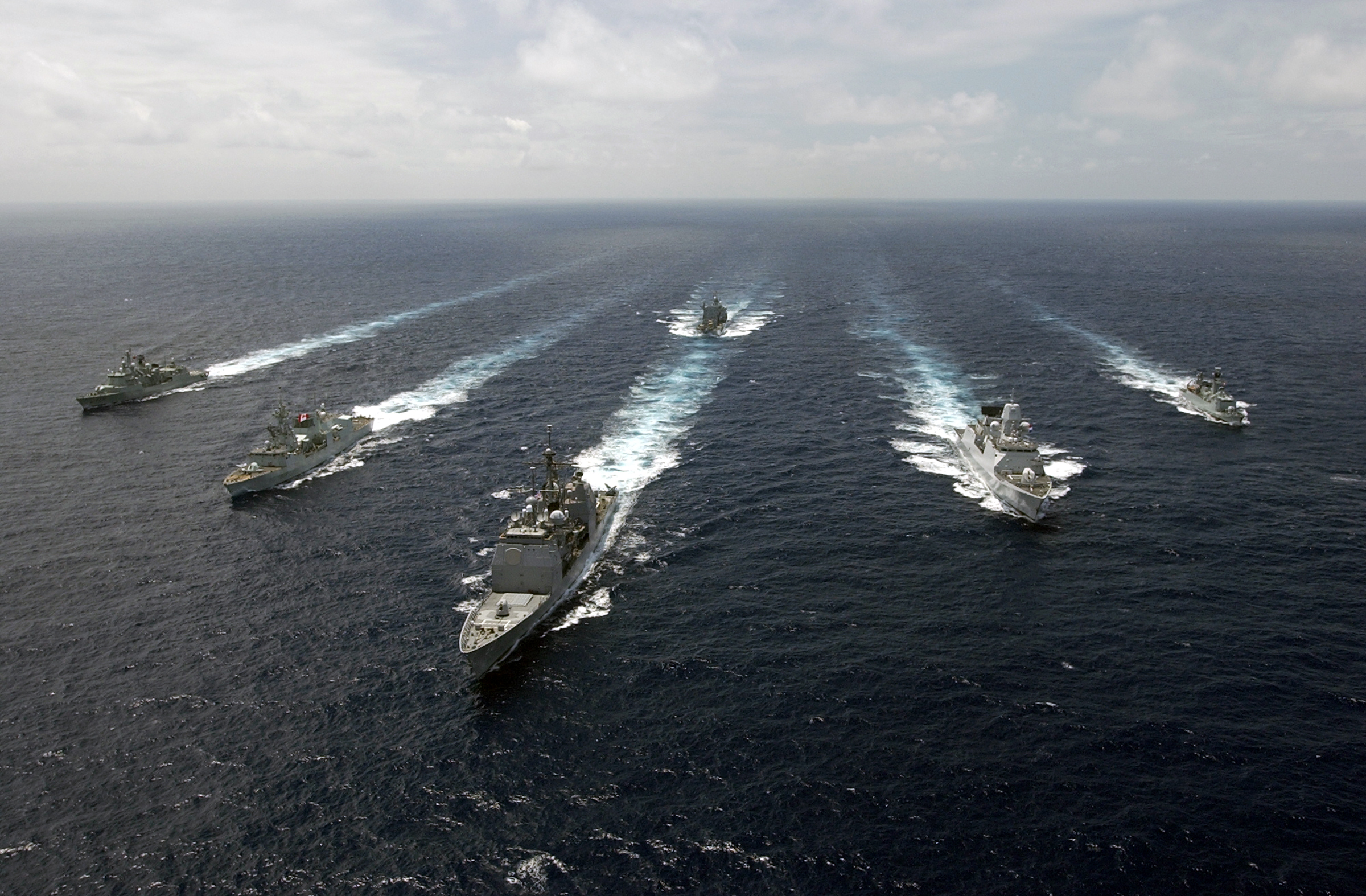
