= Saint John Shipbuilding =

Canadian shipbuilding company

- Formerly: St. John Drydock & Shipbuilding Co. (1918–1950s); Saint John Shipbuilding & Dry Dock Co., Ltd. (1950s–1980s)
- Type: Private
- Industry: Shipbuilding
- Founded: 1918; 108 years ago
- Defunct: 2003
- Headquarters: Saint John, New Brunswick, Canada
- Products: Ships
- Owner: Canada Dredging Co., Ltd. (1918–1950s); Irving Shipbuilding (from 1950s)

Saint John Shipbuilding was a Canadian shipbuilding company located in Saint John, New Brunswick. The shipyard was active from 1923 to 2000 and permanently closed in 2003 after three years remaining idle.

== History ==
Numerous shipyards were located on the shores of Courtney Bay in the east end of Saint John Harbour where extensive mud flats dried at low tide.

In 1918 it was announced that the St. John Drydock & Shipbuilding Co. would be established as a subsidiary of the Canada Dredging Co., Ltd. of Midland, Ontario and would construct the largest drydock in the world.

St. John to Have Biggest Drydock.

The drydock to be erected at the City of Saint John, N.B., will be one of the largest in the world. The contract has already been let to the St. John Drydock and Shipbuilding Company by the Department of Public Works, Ottawa. The length of the new dock will be 1,150 feet and its width at the bottom 125 feet. It will accommodate the largest vessel, naval or mercantile, which is now afloat or planned. The St. John Drydock and Shipbuilding Company is controlled by the Canada Dredging Company, Limited of Midland, Ont. Among those connected with the organization are James Playfair, General Manager of the Great Lakes Transportation Company, Ltd.; W.H. Robertson, D.L. White, Jr., W.J. Sheppard, W.E.Phin, D.S. Pratt, George Y. Chown, R. Hobson, Colonel Thomas A. Duff, J.A. Paisley, and J.B. Craven.

— August 11, 1918, The New York Times

The new shipyard with its massive drydock opened in 1923 at a location on the eastern shore of Courtney Bay. The first of its long list of vessels, the ferry MV Kipawo, which still exists, was launched on December 5, 1924. After fit-up, it went into service in 1926.

The shipyard was sold in the 1950s to the industrialist K.C. Irving. The ensuing corporate restructuring saw the company renamed Saint John Shipbuilding & Dry Dock Co., Ltd.. By the 1980s, it came to be known simply as Saint John Shipbuilding and was the flagship of a collection of eastern Canadian shipyards operated by Irving Shipbuilding.

The shipyard was used to construct oil tankers for Irving Oil and freighters and other cargo vessels for Kent Lines, a shipping company owned by K.C. Irving. The facility also received a contract from Canadian Pacific Railway in 1969 to build a passenger-vehicle ferry for its Bay of Fundy service from Saint John to Digby. Similarly, the government-owned ferry operator CN Marine placed an order in the early 1980s for a passenger-vehicle ferry for its Northumberland Strait service to Prince Edward Island.

== Canadian Patrol Frigate Project ==
By far the largest contract placed with the shipyard, and the largest single shipbuilding order ever issued in Canadian history, was for the Royal Canadian Navy's Halifax-class frigate program, which saw nine warships built at Saint John during the early 1990s. Flush with revenues during this contract, Irving Shipbuilding went on a buying spree of several bankrupt or failing shipyards in eastern Canada as part of a strategy to assist with spreading the work at its overcrowded shipyard in Saint John.

The East Isle Shipyard in Georgetown, Prince Edward Island was purchased from the provincial government and used to construct modules for the Halifax-class frigates. Similarly, Irving Shipbuilding purchased the Shelburne Ship Repair shipyard in Shelburne and the Pictou Shipyard in Pictou to support the Halifax-class project. Irving Shipbuilding also purchased Halifax Dartmouth Industries after that shipyard was sub-contracted in 1992 to build the Kingston-class coastal defence vessel as part of the Maritime Coastal Defence Vessel Project by the winning consortium led by SNC Lavalin.

However, changing global economic conditions for Canada's shipbuilders during the late 1990s coupled with changes to federal government tariffs and tax policies for Canadian ship owners saw Saint John Shipbuilding left with little work after the Halifax-class frigates were completed. Kent Lines ordered several container ships and Irving Shipbuilding's shipyards in Nova Scotia and Prince Edward Island were kept moderately busy with repair and small contract construction, but there were no large contracts on the horizon. The skilled workforce at Saint John Shipbuilding dwindled as welders and engineers and other trades and professionals left for work on other projects in Canada and abroad. The yard was mothballed in 2000 after it completed its last ship.

Finally on June 27, 2003, Irving Shipbuilding announced that it had signed an agreement with the federal government for $55 million in economic readjustment funding provided that Saint John Shipbuilding be closed permanently. The Irving Group of Companies announced the intention of permanently decommissioning Canada's largest shipyard and building a new wallboard manufacturing plant and other businesses on the site. The former dry dock cranes have been removed.

== Ships built ==
=== Warships ===
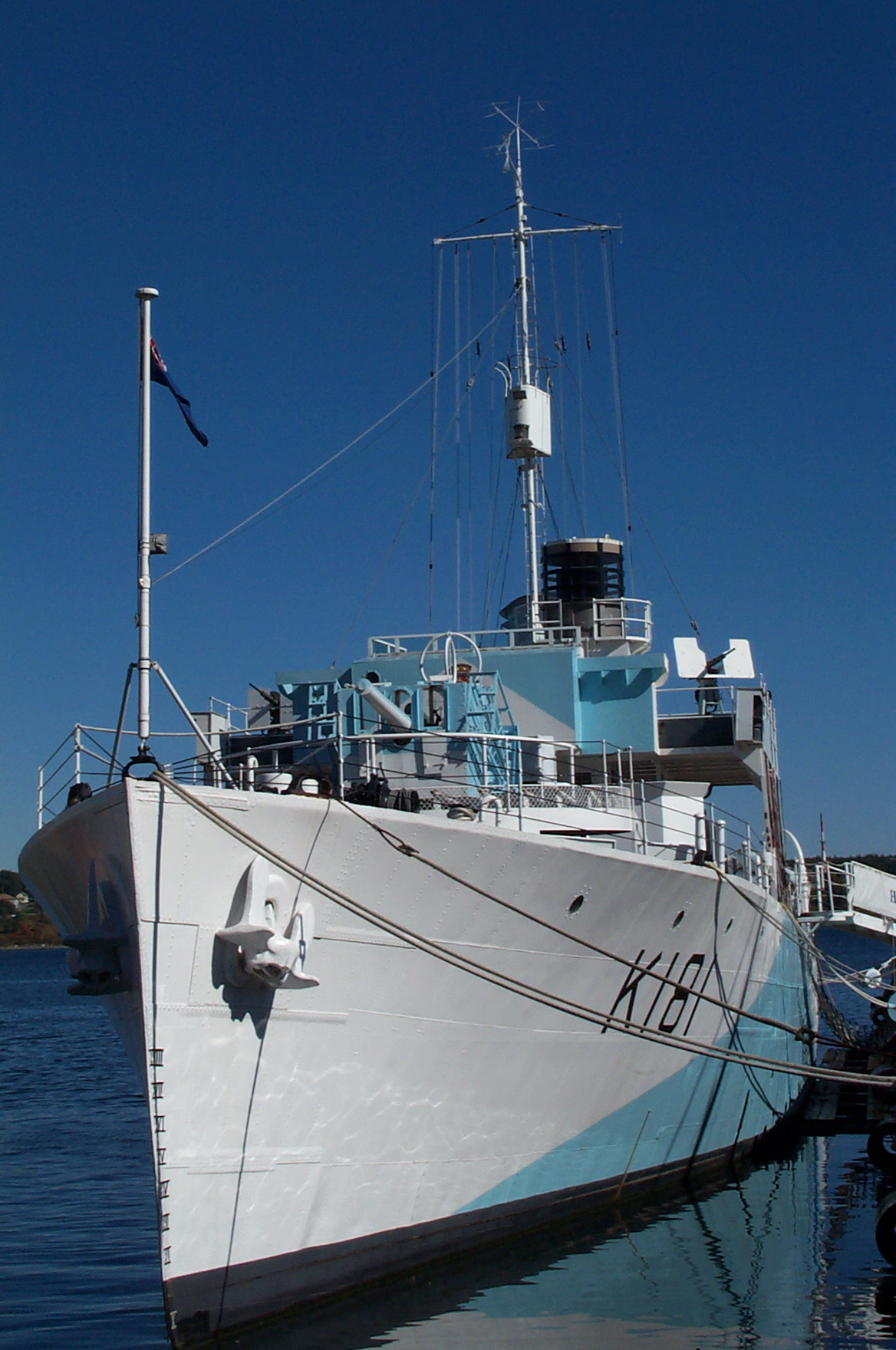
HMCS Sackville, built in Saint John in 1940, has been preserved as a museum ship.

- Flower-class corvettes:
  - HMCS Amherst, launched in 1940
  - HMCS Moncton, launched in 1941
  - HMCS Sackville, launched in 1941
- Halifax-class frigates:
  - HMCS Halifax, launched in 1988
  - HMCS Vancouver, launched in 1989
  - HMCS Toronto, launched in 1991
  - HMCS Montréal, launched in 1992
  - HMCS Fredericton, launched in 1994
  - HMCS Winnipeg, launched in 1995
  - HMCS Charlottetown, launched in 1995
  - HMCS St. John's, launched in 1996
  - HMCS Ottawa, launched in 1996
- Protecteur-class auxiliary vessels:
  - HMCS Protecteur, launched in 1968
  - HMCS Preserver, launched in 1969

=== Research vessels ===
- CCGS Hudson

=== Ferries ===
For Canadian National Railways:

- MV Petite Forte

For CN Marine:

- MV Abegweit, launched in 1982

For Canadian Pacific Railway:

- MV Kipawo
- MV Princess of Acadia, launched in 1971

For Province of New Brunswick:

- MV Grand Manan, launched in 1965 and decommissioned in 2011; wrecked off Isla Miria, San Blas Islands.

=== Icebreakers ===
- MV Kigoriak (for Canadian Marine Drilling a subsidiary of Dome Petroleum)

=== Fishing trawlers ===
- Marc Guylaine, allegedly a "cursed" ship whose two sister ships sank
