= Canadian Patrol Frigate Project =

Naval procurement project (1975–1983)

HMCS Halifax, lead ship of the Canadian Patrol Frigate Project, as seen in 2010

The Canadian Patrol Frigate Project (CPFP) was a procurement project undertaken by the Department of National Defence of Canada beginning in 1975 to find a replacement for the 20 combined ships of the Annapolis, Mackenzie, Restigouche, and St. Laurent classes of destroyer escorts. The CPFP was considered a core effort in the fleet modernization of Canada in the 1980s. Facing several contract hurdles, the construction program got underway in 1987. The CPFP became known as the Halifax-class frigate upon the construction of the ships. The Halifax class replaced the destroyer escort classes in the 1990s and remains a core element of the fleet.

== Background ==
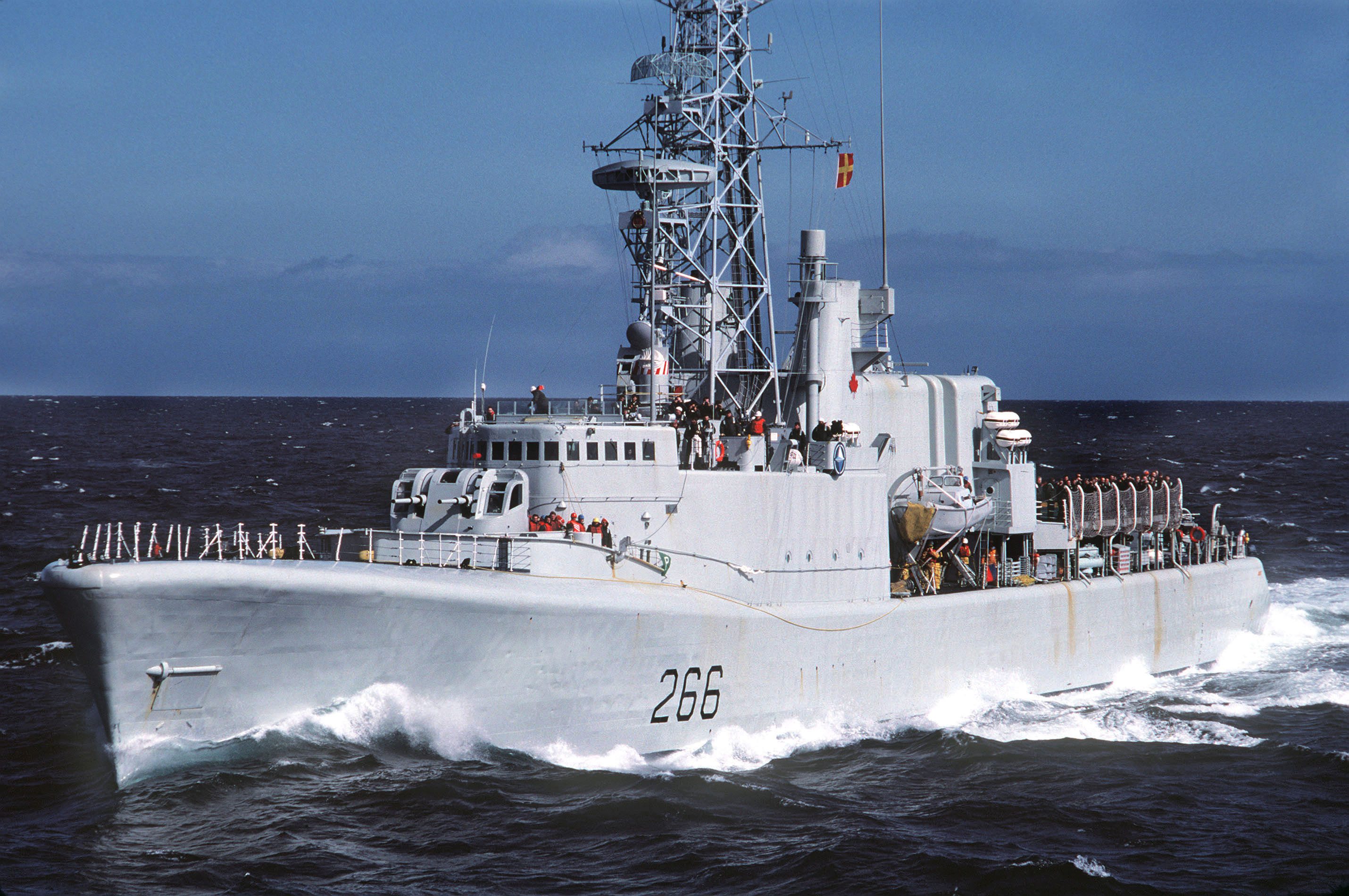
HMCS Nipigon, an Annapolis-class destroyer escort that was replaced by the Canadian Patrol Frigate Project

After calls from both internal and external sources for Canada to replace its aging fleet and upgrade its naval capability, the Canadian government announced the Ship Replacement Program. A study written in 1973 called for a frigate design in the 2,500-ton range. In 1974, another study suggested a copy of the US Oliver Hazard Perry class. The project settled on a new general purpose design in 1975. In December 1977, the Canadian Patrol Frigate Project was authorized as part of the Ship Replacement Program. The Statement of Requirement was sent out in August 1978. The Statement required a ship with general purpose capability, with its primary function as an anti-submarine warfare platform with secondary capabilities in anti-air and anti-ship warfare. The design would also have to be able to operate a helicopter and have state-of-the-art command and communications equipment.

In December 1978, five bids were received and all were larger and more expensive than planned. The project team spent the next few years finding ways to keep the original requirements while cutting costs. The costs were exacerbated by the requirement that the ships be built in Canada, which had political benefits for the Trudeau government that had authorized the program. In 1980, the number of bids were narrowed to two competitors, SCAN Marine Incorporated of Montreal, Quebec, and Saint John Shipbuilding (SJS) of Saint John, New Brunswick, and the final proposals were submitted in October 1982. A helicopter replacement program for the CH-124 Sea King was initially tied to the CPFP, but that procurement project was later delayed.

== Contract award ==
In June 1983, the federal government approved the budget for the design and construction of the first batch of six new frigates. Saint John Shipbuilding bid $1 billion less than SCAN Marine in their proposal. In order to compete, SCAN Marine lowered its bid to match that of Saint John Shipbuilding within 24 hours. This led to the Treasury Board declaring SCAN Marine's bid non-compliant, leaving Saint John Shipbuilding as the sole remaining entry.

This led to political divisions within the Trudeau government, with the Quebec Liberal caucus threatening to defect, which would bring down the government. To resolve the situation, the Tribal Refit and Update Modernisation Program (TRUMP) for the Iroquois-class destroyers was tied to the CPFP. Saint John Shipbuilding was awarded the contract for the six frigates for $3.9 billion. Quebec companies would get the TRUMP project for $1.4 billion and extras. The construction of three of Saint John Shipbuilding's six frigates would be subcontracted to Marine Industries and Davie Shipbuilding at Lauzon, Quebec.

The design of the Halifax-class frigates reflected many advances in ship construction, such as a move to a prefabricated unit construction method, where the ship is assembled from prefabricated units in a drydock instead of the traditional keel laying.

== Construction and delays ==
When the contract was awarded in 1983, the planned delivery of the frigates was to stretch from 1985 to 1990. A series of issues, deriving from the lack of experience of SJS, led to delays. The company that was awarded the contract to design the vessels, Versatile Systems Engineering, financially collapsed and was reorganized. The two Quebec shipyards were consolidated into MIL-Davie Shipbuilding. The cost of replicating all the construction and training directives into French soon raised costs. Following this series of setbacks, SJS sought aid from the US shipyard Bath Iron Works in bringing the program under control.

In March 1987, construction of the lead ship of the class, Halifax, began. In December 1987, a second batch of six frigates was ordered without tender from SJS. The sole-source contract increased the tension between SJS and MIL-Davie Shipbuilding. This came to a head when SJS sought $1.7 billion in damages from MIL-Davie Shipbuilding. The matter was settled out of court in 1992, with MIL-Davie claiming the cost overruns were caused by the "50,000 design changes". However, construction continued unabated and the program finished on time.

Halifax was accepted by Canada in June 1991. This was followed by a year of sea trials, during which the ship received negative reviews. Changes were made to the design following Halifax's sea trials and were incorporated into all the following construction. By the time Halifax had commissioned in June 1992, the rest of Batch 1 had launched and two ships of Batch 2 were building.

== Legacy ==
Twelve ships in the class were completed for the program, the last entering service in September 1996. In total, the project cost $9.54 billion and created 3,000 jobs. Named after Canadian communities, the majority of the ships in the class continued names from vessels that fought during the Second World War. A third batch of frigates was cancelled in an effort by the Canadian Forces to acquire nuclear-powered submarines in the late 1980s.

One of the purposes of the CPFP was to develop shipbuilding in Canada. Saint John Shipbuilding spent $340–360 million upgrading the shipyard in Saint John. However, the shipyard was unable to attract further government contracts and closed in 2003. MIL-Davie Shipbuilding entered receivership after failing to receive further government contracts. The program failed in that regard.

The vessels of the class were considered world class upon their delivery. The Halifax class underwent the Frigate Life Extension program between 2010 and 2016/2017. The frigates will continue to be the backbone of the fleet until the River-class destroyer replaces them in the early 2030s.

== See also ==
- Maritime Coastal Defence Vessel Project, a Canadian procurement project
- General Purpose Frigate, the previous Canadian attempt at a GP frigate
