= Regina (ship) =

Regina is the name of several ships.

Ships with this name include:

== Naval vessels ==
- HMCS Regina (K234), a Flower-class corvette, launched in 1941 and sunk in 1944, after being torpedoed by the German submarine U-667.
- HMCS Regina (FFH 334), a Halifax-class frigate, launched in 1992 and still in active service.

== Commercial vessels ==
- Regina, a New Zealand Company schooner built at Plymouth in 1841 and wrecked in New Plymouth that same year.
- SS Regina (1856), a screw steamer, originally launched in 1856 as SS Teutonia, renamed SS Regina between 1884 and 1889, and scrapped in 1894.
- SS Regina (1904), a tanker, launched in 1904 and sank off Florida in 1940.
- SS Regina (1907), a cargo ship, launched in 1907 and sunk in 1913
- SS Regina (1917), transatlantic ocean liner launched in 1917, renamed SS Westernland as a troop ship in 1929, and scrapped in 1947.
- SS Regina (1939), an ocean liner, launched in 1938 as SS Panama, renamed SS Regina from 1964 to 1973, scrapped in 1985.
- MV A Regina, a RO-RO car cruise ferry launched in 1967 as Stena Germanica, renamed A Regina in 1979, sank off Puerto Rico in 1985.

== See also ==
- Regina (disambiguation)
- MS Santa Regina, a roll-on/roll-off ferry, launched in 1984, and renamed KMP in 2015.
- MS Mega Regina, a cruiseferry, launched in 1985 as MS Mariella, and renamed MS Mega Regina in 2021.
- SS Regina, a ship's name for steamships
- HMCS Regina, a Royal Canadian Navy shipname
