= Regina =

Regina (Latin for "queen") may refer to:

== Places ==
=== Canada ===
- Regina, Saskatchewan, the capital city of the province
  - Regina (electoral district)
  - Roman Catholic Archdiocese of Regina

=== France ===
- Régina, French Guiana, a commune

=== United States ===
- Regina, Minneapolis, Minnesota, a neighborhood
- Regina, Missouri, an unincorporated community
- Regina, New Mexico, a census-designated place
- Regina, Virginia, an unincorporated community
- Regina, Wisconsin, an unincorporated community

== People ==
- Regina (given name)
- Regina (name)
- Regina (concubine), 8th century French concubine of Charlemagne
- Regina (martyr) (died 251 or 286), French martyr
- Regina (American singer), American singer Regina Marie Cuttita (fl. 1978–1993)
- Regina (Slovenian singer), Slovenian singer born Irena Jalšovec (born 1965)
- Regina "Queen" Saraiva (born 1968), Eurodance singer with the stage name Regina

== Films ==
- Regina (1987 film), an Italian drama film
- Regina (1989 film), an Estonian film
- Regina (2023 film), an Indian film

== Music ==
- Regina (Bosnia and Herzegovina band), a Bosnian rock band
- Regina (Finnish band). a Finnish synth-pop band
- Regina (Lortzing), 1848 opera by Albert Lortzing, first performed in 1899
- Regina (Blitzstein), a 1948 opera by Marc Blitzstein
- Regina (play) (Spanish: Regina: Un Musical Para Una Nación Que Despierta), a 1997 Mexican musical
- Regina (album) (Spanish: Regina: Un Musical Para Una Nación Que Despierta), 2003 album based on the eponymous play
- "Regina", a 1989 song by the Sugarcubes from Here Today, Tomorrow Next Week!
- "Reġina", a 2023 song by Aidan

== Other uses ==
- Regina (ship), a list of naval and commercial ships
- 50th Infantry Division Regina, an Italian infantry division of World War II
- Hôtel Regina, a hotel in Paris
- Regina Company, an American manufacturer of mechanical musical instruments
- Regina (pottery), Dutch art pottery manufactured by Kunstaardewerkfabriek Regina
- Regina (snake), a genus of colubrid snakes
- Regina (train), a Swedish model of passenger train
- Regina, an implementation of Rexx

== See also ==
- Regina Regina, an American country music duo
- Villa Regina, Río Negro, Argentina, a city
- Reggina Calcio, an Italian football club
- Regine
