= HMCS Winnipeg =

Several Canadian naval units have been named HMCS Winnipeg.

- HMCS Winnipeg (J337) (I) was an Algerine-class minesweeper that served in the Royal Canadian Navy. HMCS Winnipeg served from its commission in March 1943 to November 1946.
- HMCS Winnipeg (FFH 338) (II) is a Halifax-class frigate serving in the Canadian Forces Maritime Command since 1996.

== Battle honours ==
- Atlantic, 1943–45
- Arabian Sea
