= HMCS Fredericton =

HMCS Fredericton may refer to:

- HMCS Fredericton (K245), was a Flower-class corvette that served during the Battle of the Atlantic
- HMCS Fredericton (FFH 337), a Halifax-class frigate commissioned in 1994

== Battle honours ==
- Atlantic, 1942–45
- Arabian Sea
