= Shipboard Integrated Communications System =

Naval intraship and external communication system

The Shipboard Integrated Communications System (SHINCOM) is a naval intraship and external communication system manufactured by DRS Technology Canada (DRS TCL). It was developed for the Royal Canadian Navy's (RCN) Halifax-class frigates. It also became part of the United States Navy's (USN) Aegis Combat System, through which it was exported to other foreign navies.

By 2017, SHINCOM had been installed on over 150 warships.

== Versions ==
SHINCOM

Original version installed on RCN Halifax-class frigates.

SHINCOM II

Developmental version using commercial off-the-shelf standard programming language and interfaces, instead of proprietary standard. Developed in the late-1990s by DRS TCL with the Canadian Department of National Defence.

SHINCOM 2100

Production version developed from SHINCOM II and deployed by the RCN.

SHINCOM 3100

== Variants ==
The first version of SHINCOM won sales to the United States military at the same time it was installed on the Halifax-class frigates.

The underlying technology of SHINCOM 2100 contributed to the AN/ON-568 Secure Voice System, which was a part of the USN Aegis Combat System. SHINCOM 2100 was exported to navies that also bought Aegis. In USN service, SHINCOM is known as the Integrated Voice Communications Systems (IVCS).

== Operators ==
Australia
Canada
Japan
New Zealand
Republic of Korea
United States
