= HMCS Fredericton (FFH 337) =

Royal Canadian Navy frigate

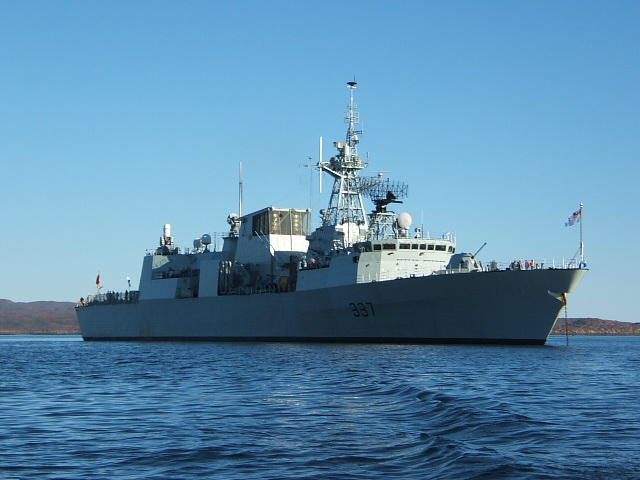
- HMCS Fredericton off Iqaluit in 2007

History

Canada
- Name: Fredericton
- Namesake: Fredericton, New Brunswick
- Builder: Saint John Shipbuilding Ltd., Saint John
- Laid down: 25 April 1992
- Launched: 26 June 1993
- Commissioned: 10 September 1994
- Refit: HCM/FELEX (October 2011 – January 2013)
- Home port: CFB Halifax
- Identification: MMSI number: 316143000; Callsign: CGAN
- Motto: "Stalker of the Seas"
- Nickname(s): "The Freddie"
- Honours and awards: Atlantic 1942–45, Arabian Sea
- Status: in active service
- Badge: Vert, a bend wavy argent charged with a like bendlet azure and overall a Bengal tiger prepared to leap.

General characteristics
- Class & type: Halifax-class frigate
- Displacement: 3,995 tonnes (light); 4,795 tonnes (operational); 5,032 tonnes (deep load)
- Length: 134.2 m (440 ft)
- Beam: 16.5 m (54 ft)
- Draught: 7.1 m (23 ft)
- Propulsion: 2 × LM2500 gas turbines; 1 × SEMT Pielstick diesel engine
- Speed: In excess of 30 knots (56 km/h; 35 mph)
- Range: 9,500 nautical miles (17,600 km; 10,900 mi)
- Complement: 255 (including air det.)
- Armament: Missiles; 2 × quad Mk 141 canisters for 8 × RGM-84 Harpoon block II AShM/LAM; 2 × 8-cell Mk 48 vertical launch system firing 16 × RIM-162 Evolved Sea Sparrow block II SAM/SSM; Guns; 1 × Bofors 57 mm Mk3 gun; 1 × Phalanx CIWS Mk 15 Mod 21 block 1B; 4 × .50-calibre M2HQ Mini Typhoon; Torpedoes; 2 × twin 324 mm (12.8 in) Mk 32 torpedo tubes for 24 × Honeywell Mk 46 Mod 5 torpedoes
- Aircraft carried: 1 × Sikorsky CH-148 Cyclone

HMCS Fredericton is a Halifax-class frigate that has served in the Canadian Forces since 1994. Fredericton is the eighth ship in her class which is based on the Canadian Patrol Frigate Project. She is the second vessel to carry the name. Fredericton serves on MARLANT missions protecting Canada's sovereignty in the Atlantic Ocean and enforcing Canadian laws in its territorial sea and Exclusive Economic Zone. Fredericton has also been deployed on missions throughout the Atlantic and to the Indian Ocean; specifically the Persian Gulf and Arabian Sea on anti-terrorism operations. Fredericton has also participated in several NATO missions, patrolling the Atlantic Ocean as part of Standing Naval Force Atlantic (STANAVFORLANT) and its successor Standing NATO Response Force Maritime Group 1 (SNMG1). The frigate is assigned to Maritime Forces Atlantic (MARLANT) and is homeported at CFB Halifax.

As of 8 July 2022 Fredericton has been commanded by Commander Matt Mitchell.

== Description and design ==
The Halifax-class frigate design, emerging from the Canadian Patrol Frigate Project, was ordered by the Canadian Forces in 1977 as a replacement for the aging St. Laurent, Restigouche, Mackenzie, and Annapolis classes of destroyer escorts, which were all tasked with anti-submarine warfare. Fredericton was ordered in December 1987 as part of the second batch of frigates. To reflect the changing long term strategy of the Navy during the 1980s and 1990s, the Halifax-class frigate was designed as a general purpose warship with particular focus on anti-submarine capabilities.

As built, the Halifax-class vessels displaced 4,750 long tons (4,830 t) and were 134.65 metres (441 ft 9 in) long overall and 124.49 metres (408 ft 5 in) between perpendiculars with a beam of 16.36 metres (53 ft 8 in) and a draught of 4.98 metres (16 ft 4 in). That made them slightly larger than the Iroquois-class destroyers. The vessels are propelled by two shafts with Escher Wyss controllable pitch propellers driven by a CODOG system of two General Electric LM2500 gas turbines, generating 47,500 shaft horsepower (35,400 kW) and one SEMT Pielstick 20 PA6 V 280 diesel engine, generating 8,800 shaft horsepower (6,600 kW).

This gives the frigates a maximum speed of 29 knots (54 km/h; 33 mph) and a range of 7,000 nautical miles (13,000 km; 8,100 mi) at 15 knots (28 km/h; 17 mph) while using their diesel engines. Using their gas turbines, the ships have a range of 3,930 nautical miles (7,280 km; 4,520 mi) at 18 knots (33 km/h; 21 mph). The Halifax class have a complement of 198 naval personnel of which 17 are officers and 17 aircrew of which 8 are officers.

=== Armament and aircraft ===
As built the Halifax-class vessels deployed the CH-124 Sea King helicopter, which acted in concert with shipboard sensors to seek out and destroy submarines at long distances from the ships. The ships have a helicopter deck fitted with a "bear trap" system allowing the launch and recovery of helicopters in up to sea state 6. The Halifax class also carries a close-in anti-submarine weapon in the form of the Mark 46 torpedo, launched from twin Mark 32 Mod 9 torpedo tubes in launcher compartments either side of the forward end of the helicopter hangar.

As built, the anti-shipping role is supported by the RGM-84 Harpoon Block 1C surface-to-surface missile, mounted in two quadruple launch tubes at the main deck level between the funnel and the helicopter hangar. For anti-aircraft self-defence the ships are armed with the Sea Sparrow vertical launch surface-to-air missile in two Mk 48 Mod 0 eight-cell launchers placed to port and starboard of the funnel. The vessels carry 16 missiles. A Raytheon/General Dynamics Phalanx Mark 15 Mod 21 Close-In Weapon System (CIWS) is mounted on top of the helicopter hangar for "last-ditch" defence against targets that evade the Sea Sparrow.

As built, the main gun on the forecastle is a 57 mm (2.2 in)/70 calibre Mark 2 gun from Bofors. (Note: The 70 calibre denotes the length of the gun. This means that the length of the gun barrel is 70 times the bore diameter.) The gun is capable of firing 2.4-kilogram (5.3 lb) shells at a rate of 220 rounds per minute at a range of more than 17 kilometres (11 mi). The vessels also carry eight 12.7 mm (0.50 in) machine guns.

=== Countermeasures and sensors ===
As built, the decoy system comprises Two BAE Systems Shield Mark 2 decoy launchers which fire chaff to 2 kilometres (1.2 mi) and infrared rockets to 169 metres (185 yd) in distraction, confusion and centroid seduction modes. The torpedo decoy is the AN/SLQ-25A Nixie towed acoustic decoy from Argon ST. The ship's radar warning receiver, the CANEWS (Canadian Electronic Warfare System), SLQ-501, and the radar jammer, SLQ-505, were developed by Thorn and Lockheed Martin Canada.

Two Thales Nederland (formerly Signaal) SPG-503 (STIR 1.8) fire control radars are installed one on the roof of the bridge and one on the raised radar platform immediately forward of the helicopter hangar. The ship is also fitted with Raytheon AN/SPS-49(V)5 long-range active air search radar operating at C and D bands, Ericsson HC150 Sea Giraffe medium-range air and surface search radar operating at G and H bands, and Kelvin Hughes Type 1007 I-band navigation radar. The sonar suite includes the CANTASS Canadian Towed Array and GD-C AN/SQS-510 hull mounted sonar and incorporates an acoustic range prediction system. The sonobuoy processing system is the GD-C AN/UYS-503.

=== Modernization ===
The Halifax class underwent a modernization program, known as the Halifax Class Modernization (HCM) program, in order to update the frigates' capabilities in combatting modern smaller, faster and more mobile threats. This involved upgrading the command and control, radar, communications, electronic warfare and armament systems. Further improvements, such as modifying the vessel to accommodate the new Sikorsky CH-148 Cyclone helicopter and satellite links will be done separately from the main Frigate Equipment Life Extension (FELEX) program.

The FELEX program comprised upgrading the combat systems integration to CMS330. The SPS-49 2D long range air search radar was replaced by the Thales Nederland SMART-S Mk 2 E/F-band 3D surveillance radar, and the two STIR 1.8 fire control radars were replaced by a pair of Saab Ceros 200 re-control radars. A Telephonics IFF Mode 5/S interrogator was installed and the Elisra NS9003A-V2HC ESM system replaced the SLQ-501 CANEWS. An IBM multi-link (Link 11, Link 16 and Link 22 enabled) datalink processing system was installed along with two Raytheon Anschütz Pathfinder Mk II navigation radars. Furthermore, Rheinmetall's Multi-Ammunition Soft kill System (MASS), known as MASS DUERAS was introduced to replace the Plessey Shield decoy system. The existing 57 mm Mk 2 guns were upgraded to the Mk 3 standard and the Harpoon missiles were improved to Block II levels, the Phalanx was upgraded to Block 1B and the obsolete Sea Sparrow system was replaced by the Evolved Sea Sparrow Missile.

== Operational history ==
Fredericton's keel was laid down on 25 April 1992 at Saint John Shipbuilding Ltd. at Saint John, New Brunswick and the frigate was launched on 26 June 1993. Fredericton was commissioned into the Canadian Forces on 10 September 1994 and carries the hull classification symbol FFH 337. From February to April 1995, the frigate sailed to the Persian Gulf to take part in sanctions enforcement against Iraq that were instituted following the end of the Gulf War. On 5 April, while transiting the Gulf of Aden, the frigate responded to a distress call from the yacht Longo Barda which was under attack by pirates.

Fredericton was among the Canadian warships that participated in Operation Sharp Guard, enforcing the United Nations blockade of Yugoslavia. The warship deployed to the Adriatic Sea, joining the blockade force on 14 December 1995. Fredericton was flagship of the force from 29 February to 11 March 1996. The ship returned to Halifax on 4 April 1996. In 1996, Fredericton took part in a NATO naval exercise in the Norwegian Sea. While returning home from the naval exercise, the ship suffered damage during a storm. The ship deployed three more times to NATO units, in 1997, 2000 and 2001. The frigate sailed to take part in Operation Apollo, Canada's contribution to the War in Afghanistan. The vessel was in theatre from 5 March to 28 August 2003 performing maritime interdiction and fleet support missions.

=== Fire and collision ===
A fire broke out in the forward engine room of the frigate on 6 May 2009. The fire was suppressed within a few minutes and the ship made a brief stop at the home base of Halifax before being given the all-clear to return to sea. Fredericton departed Halifax, Nova Scotia on 25 October 2009 to commence her transit to the Gulf of Aden, northern Arabian Sea and Gulf of Oman. She integrated into SNMG1 in November 2009 and remained with SNMG1 until February 2010 conducting counter-piracy patrols in the Gulf of Aden and Somali Basin. Following a Rest and Maintenance Period (RAMP), the vessel integrated into Combined Task Force 150 (CTF 150) to conduct counter-terror patrols in the Gulf of Aden and Gulf of Oman. Fredericton returned home on 4 May 2010, the 100th Anniversary of the Canadian Navy. On 18 November 2010, Fredericton briefly came into contact with USNS Kanawha during a replenishment-at-sea manoeuvre off the coast of Florida. There were no injuries, but both ships suffered superficial damage consisting of scrapes and dents on both hulls.

=== Refit ===
On 6 October 2011, Fredericton was turned over to Irving Shipbuilding's Halifax Shipyards, to start the vessel's FELEX mid-life upgrading and modernization. Fredericton was returned to CFB Halifax Dockyard on 24 January 2013. She completed readiness work-ups (WUPs) in September 2014. Following her refit, Fredericton was deployed to the Mediterranean Sea as part of Operation Reassurance on 30 December 2014. The frigate joined Standing NATO Maritime Group 2 (SNMG2) in the Black Sea in March 2015 for training exercises. As part of SNMG2, Fredericton took part in Exercise "Joint Warrior", a training exercise off the coast of the United Kingdom in April 2015.

Fredericton deployed to the Baltic Sea in June 2015 for training. While there Prime Minister Stephen Harper and Defence Minister Jason Kenney visited the ship. While they were aboard, the frigate was tailed by two Russian ships keeping a distance of 7 nautical miles (13 km). The frigate returned from deployment on 12 July 2015. During a routine inspection in November, fissures were found in the hull requiring repairs at Halifax. Following completion of repairs, the ship relieved Winnipeg in the Mediterranean, sailing on 5 January 2016.

During her deployment with SNMG2 in the Mediterranean, Fredericton was charged with halting the smuggling of migrants to Europe. In April it was announced that Fredericton would be one of the test ships for the Royal Canadian Navy's planned reduced crew size trials. Fredericton deployed to Operation Reassurance with a reduced version of the experiment that will be done on sister ship Montréal. The same month, SNMG2 deployed to the Black Sea as part of Operation Reassurance. The ship returned to Halifax on 5 July 2016.

In September 2016 Fredericton was among the Canadian warships deployed to the NATO naval training exercise "Cutlass Fury" off the east coast of North America. In November the frigate sailed to the Caribbean Sea visiting several nations. Fredericton stopped at Cuba to make the first port visit by a Canadian warship in 50 years to the country.

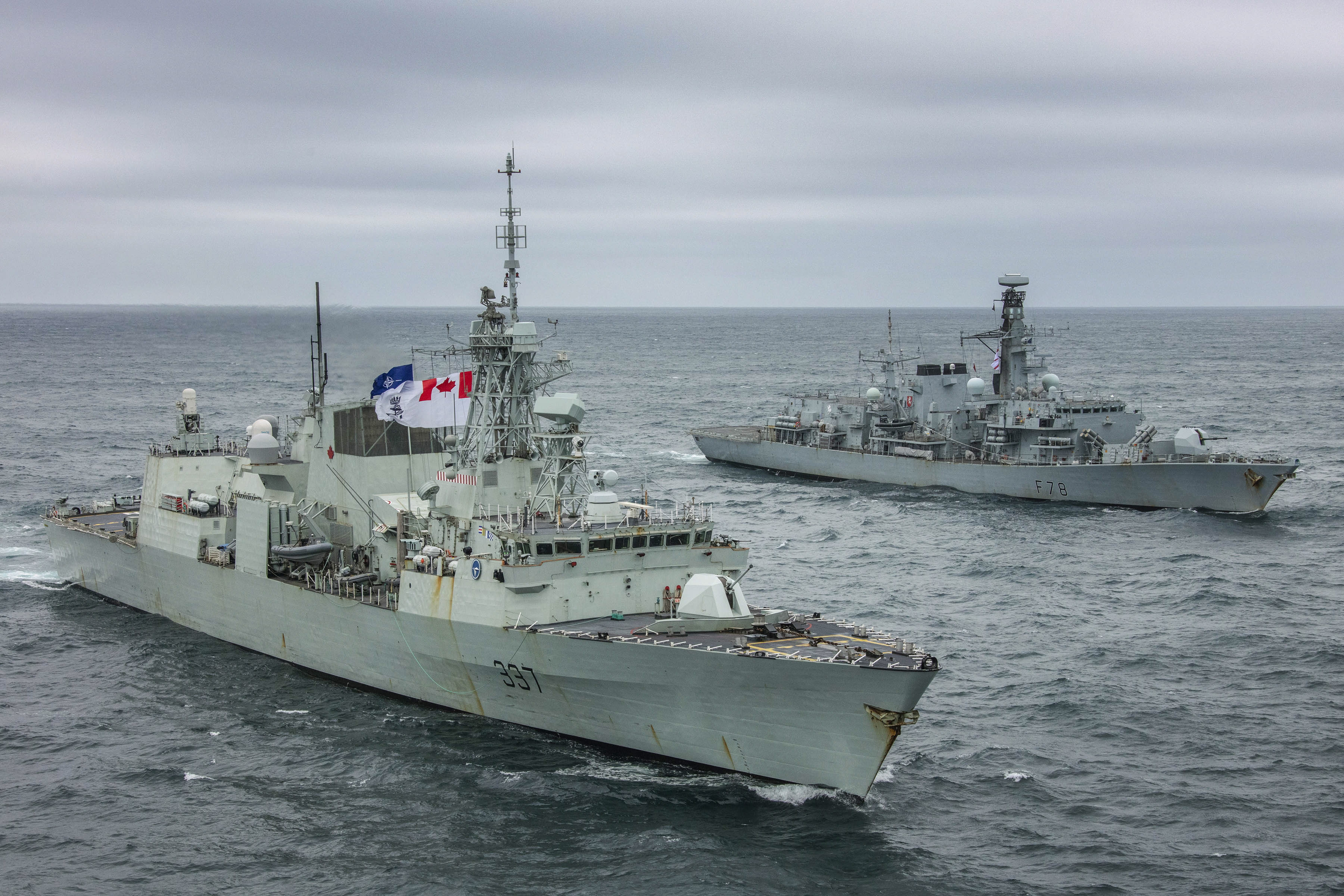
HMCS Fredericton and HMS Kent in July 2020

On 20 January 2020, Fredericton departed Halifax as part of Operation Reassurance in the Mediterranean and Black seas. While in the Mediterranean, the frigate made a port call in Italy in March, sparking concerns over possible infection during the COVID-19 pandemic. However, no cases were found aboard the ship and the vessel was ordered to cancel a number of other port calls while continuing its mission.

=== Helicopter crash ===
On 29 April 2020, it was reported the frigate's CH-148 Cyclone had crashed into the Ionian Sea, near the Greek island of Cephalonia. The helicopter had been returning from a NATO training mission, with six members of the Canadian Armed Forces on board, at the time of the incident. Of the six service members killed, four were members of the Royal Canadian Air Force, with the remaining two members of the Royal Canadian Navy. As of 1 May 2020, only one body has been recovered, with the remaining victims missing and presumed dead. The specialised salvage ship EDT Hercules was dispatched with Canadian and American military recovery teams from Souda Bay, Greece to recover the wreckage of the Cyclone helicopter on 25 May. The wreckage was located in 3,000 metres (9,800 ft) of water. Fredericton returned to Halifax on 28 July 2020. The crash was caused in part by a conflict between the helicopter's autopilot and the pilot's manual controls. The investigation further concluded that manufacturer supplied CH148 publications contained "information that may have been confusing or misleading to operators, contained numerous sections on automation considerations that were incomplete, and lacked manoeuvre descriptions that would have been required for operational use." The recommended fix was to modify the software embedded within the electronic flight control laws and to enhance flight mode annunciation and awareness to the crew.

=== 2021 fire ===
Fredericton departed Halifax on 24 July 2021 for a six-month deployment with NATO in European waters. Participating in the Norwegian led exercise FLOTEX 2021, on 18 November Fredericton reported a fire in the forward engine room. The fire was put out by the crew, but led to loss of propulsion for some time. The frigate later recovered propulsion and was assisted by the Norwegian Coast Guard to port in Trondheim for repairs. The fire occurred when a temporary bilge pump was left connected while the main pump was under repair. The ship returned to Canada on 18 December.

In January 2023, Fredericton departed Halifax for another six-month deployment in support of NATO operations in the Mediterranean Sea. The vessel returned in July.

In the fall of 2025, Fredericton was turned over to Halifax Shipyard to begin an extensive refit, maintenance and repair period. It is expected to enter drydock in 2027.
