= HMCS Regina =

Several Canadian naval units have been named HMCS Regina.

- HMCS Regina (K234) (I) was a Flower-class corvette that served in the Royal Canadian Navy during the Second World War.
- HMCS Regina (FFH 334) (II) is a Halifax-class frigate that serves in the Canadian Forces.

== Battle honours ==
- Atlantic, 1942–44
- Gulf of St. Lawrence, 1942, 1944.
- Mediterranean, 1943.
- English Channel, 1944.
- Normandy, 1944.
- Arabian Sea

== See also ==
- SS Regina
- RMS Regina
