= SS Regina =

SS Regina may refer to:

- SS Regina (1856), in service 1884–1889
- SS Regina (1904), a ship that sank off Bradenton Beach, Florida, in 1940; wreck is a Florida Underwater Archaeological Preserve and listed on the National Register of Historic Places
- SS Regina (1907), a ship that sank in Lake Huron in the Great Lakes Storm of 1913; wreck is a dive site in the Sanilac Shores Underwater Preserve
- SS Regina (1917), a passenger ship built by Harland and Wolff for the Dominion Line in 1917
- SS Regina (1939), an ocean liner owned by Chandris Lines, scrapped in 1985.

== See also ==
- HMCS Regina
- RMS Regina
