= HMCS Regina (FFH 334) =

Royal Canadian Navy frigate

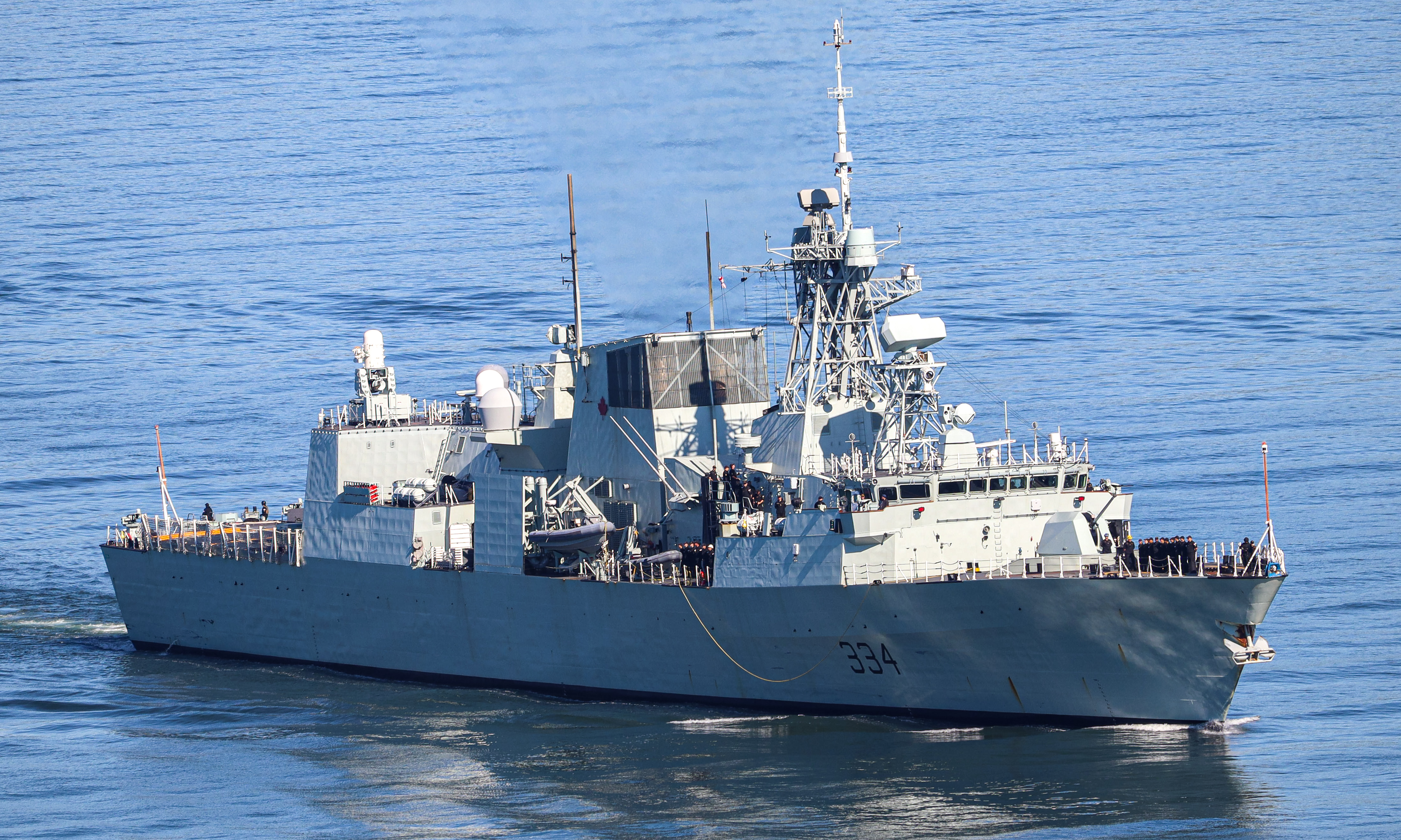
- Regina in Burrard Inlet in June 2025

History

Canada
- Name: Regina
- Namesake: Regina, Saskatchewan
- Builder: MIL-Davie Shipbuilding, Lévis
- Laid down: 6 October 1989
- Launched: 25 January 1992
- Commissioned: 30 September 1994
- Refit: HCM/FELEX May 2015 – April 2016
- Home port: CFB Esquimalt
- Identification: MMSI number: 316148000; Callsign: CGAE
- Motto: Latin: Floreat Regina (Let Regina flourish)
- Honours and awards: Atlantic 1942–44, Gulf of St Lawrence 1942, Mediterranean 1943, Normandy 1944, English Channel 1944, Arabian Sea
- Fate: in active service

General characteristics
- Class & type: Halifax-class frigate
- Displacement: 3,995 tonnes (light); 4,795 tonnes (operational); 5,032 tonnes (deep load)
- Length: 134.2 m (440 ft)
- Beam: 16.5 m (54 ft)
- Draught: 7.1 m (23 ft)
- Propulsion: 2 × LM2500 gas turbines; 1 × SEMT Pielstick diesel engine
- Speed: 30 knots (56 km/h; 35 mph)
- Range: 9,500 nmi (17,600 km; 10,900 mi)
- Complement: 255 (including air detachment)
- Armament: Missiles; 2 × quad Mk 141 canisters for 8 × RGM-84 Harpoon block II AShM/LAM; 2 × 8-cell Mk 48 vertical launch system firing 16 × RIM-162 Evolved Sea Sparrow block II SAM/SSM; Guns; 1 × Bofors 57 mm Mk3 gun; 1 × Phalanx CIWS Mk 15 Mod 21 block 1B; 4 × .50-calibre M2HQ Mini Typhoon NRWS; Torpedoes; 2 × twin 324 mm (12.8 in) Mk 32 torpedo tubes for 24 × Honeywell Mk 46 Mod 5 torpedoes
- Aircraft carried: 1 × CH-148 Cyclone

HMCS Regina is a Halifax-class frigate that has served in the Canadian Forces and Royal Canadian Navy since 1993. Regina is the fifth vessel in her class which is the name for the Canadian Patrol Frigate Project. She is the second vessel to carry the designation HMCS Regina. She is assigned to Maritime Forces Pacific (MARPAC) and is homeported at CFB Esquimalt.

== Design and description ==
The Halifax-class frigate design of which Regina belongs, was ordered by the Canadian Forces in 1977 as a replacement for the aging St. Laurent, Restigouche, Mackenzie, and Annapolis classes of destroyer escorts, which were all tasked with anti-submarine warfare. In July 1983, the federal government approved the budget for the design and construction of the first batch of six new frigates of which Regina was a part, out of twelve that were eventually built. To reflect the changing long term strategy of the Navy during the 1980s and 1990s, the Halifax-class frigates was designed as a general purpose warship with particular focus on anti-submarine capabilities.

As built, the Halifax-class vessels displaced 4,750 long tons (4,830 t) and were 134.65 metres (441 ft 9 in) long overall and 124.49 metres (408 ft 5 in) between perpendiculars with a beam of 16.36 metres (53 ft 8 in) and a draught of 4.98 metres (16 ft 4 in). That made them slightly larger than the Iroquois-class destroyers. The vessels are propelled by two shafts with Escher Wyss controllable pitch propellers driven by a CODOG system of two General Electric LM2500 gas turbines, generating 47,500 shaft horsepower (35,400 kW) and one SEMT Pielstick 20 PA6 V 280 diesel engine, generating 8,800 shaft horsepower (6,600 kW).

This gives the frigates a maximum speed of 29 knots (54 km/h; 33 mph) and a range of 7,000 nautical miles (13,000 km; 8,100 mi) at 15 knots (28 km/h; 17 mph) while using their diesel engines. Using their gas turbines, the ships have a range of 3,930 nautical miles (7,280 km; 4,520 mi) at 18 knots (33 km/h; 21 mph). The Halifax class have a complement of 198 naval personnel of which 17 are officers and 17 aircrew of which 8 are officers.

=== Armament and aircraft ===
As built the Halifax-class vessels deployed the CH-124 Sea King helicopter, which acted in concert with shipboard sensors to seek out and destroy submarines at long distances from the ships. The ships have a helicopter deck fitted with a "bear trap" system allowing the launch and recovery of helicopters in up to sea state 6. The Halifax class also carries a close-in anti-submarine weapon in the form of the Mark 46 torpedo, launched from twin Mark 32 Mod 9 torpedo tubes in launcher compartments either side of the forward end of the helicopter hangar.

As built, the anti-shipping role is supported by the RGM-84 Harpoon Block 1C surface-to-surface missile, mounted in two quadruple launch tubes at the main deck level between the funnel and the helicopter hangar. For anti-aircraft self-defence the ships are armed with the Sea Sparrow vertical launch surface-to-air missile in two Mk 48 Mod 0 eight-cell launchers placed to port and starboard of the funnel. The vessels carry 16 missiles. A Raytheon/General Dynamics Phalanx Mark 15 Mod 21 Close-In Weapon System (CIWS) is mounted on top of the helicopter hangar for "last-ditch" defence against targets that evade the Sea Sparrow.

As built, the main gun on the forecastle is a 57 mm (2.2 in)/70 calibre Mark 2 gun from Bofors. (Note: The 70 calibre denotes the length of the gun. This means that the length of the gun barrel is 70 times the bore diameter.) The gun is capable of firing 2.4-kilogram (5.3 lb) shells at a rate of 220 rounds per minute at a range of more than 17 kilometres (11 mi).

=== Countermeasures and sensors ===
As built, the decoy system comprises Two BAE Systems Shield Mark 2 decoy launchers which fire chaff to 2 kilometres (1.2 mi) and infrared rockets to 169 metres (185 yd) in distraction, confusion and centroid seduction modes. The torpedo decoy is the AN/SLQ-25A Nixie towed acoustic decoy from Argon ST. The ship's radar warning receiver, the CANEWS (Canadian Electronic Warfare System), SLQ-501, and the radar jammer, SLQ-505, were developed by Thorn and Lockheed Martin Canada.

Two Thales Nederland (formerly Signaal) SPG-503 (STIR 1.8) fire control radars are installed one on the roof of the bridge and one on the raised radar platform immediately forward of the helicopter hangar. The ship is also fitted with Raytheon AN/SPS-49(V)5 long-range active air search radar operating at C and D bands, Ericsson HC150 Sea Giraffe medium-range air and surface search radar operating at G and H bands, and Kelvin Hughes Type 1007 I-band navigation radar. The sonar suite includes the CANTASS Canadian Towed Array and GD-C AN/SQS-510 hull mounted sonar and incorporates an acoustic range prediction system. The sonobuoy processing system is the GD-C AN/UYS-503.

=== Modernization ===
The Halifax class underwent a modernization program, known as the Halifax Class Modernization (HCM) program, in order to update the frigates' capabilities in combatting modern smaller, faster and more mobile threats. This involved upgrading the command and control, radar, communications, electronic warfare and armament systems. Further improvements, such as modifying the vessel to accommodate the new Sikorsky CH-148 Cyclone helicopter and satellite links will be done separately from the main Frigate Equipment Life Extension (FELEX) program.

The FELEX program comprised upgrading the combat systems integration to CMS330. The SPS-49 2D long range air search radar was replaced by the Thales Nederland SMART-S Mk 2 E/F-band 3D surveillance radar, and the two STIR 1.8 fire control radars were replaced by a pair of Saab Ceros 200 re-control radars. A Telephonics IFF Mode 5/S interrogator was installed and the Elisra NS9003A-V2HC ESM system replaced the SLQ-501 CANEWS. An IBM multi-link (Link 11, Link 16 and Link 22 enabled) datalink processing system was installed along with two Raytheon Anschütz Pathfinder Mk II navigation radars. Furthermore, Rheinmetall's Multi-Ammunition Soft kill System (MASS), known as MASS DUERAS was introduced to replace the Plessey Shield decoy system. The existing 57 mm Mk 2 guns were upgraded to the Mk 3 standard and the Harpoon missiles were improved to Block II levels, the Phalanx was upgraded to Block 1B and the obsolete Sea Sparrow system was replaced by the Evolved Sea Sparrow Missile.

== Service history ==
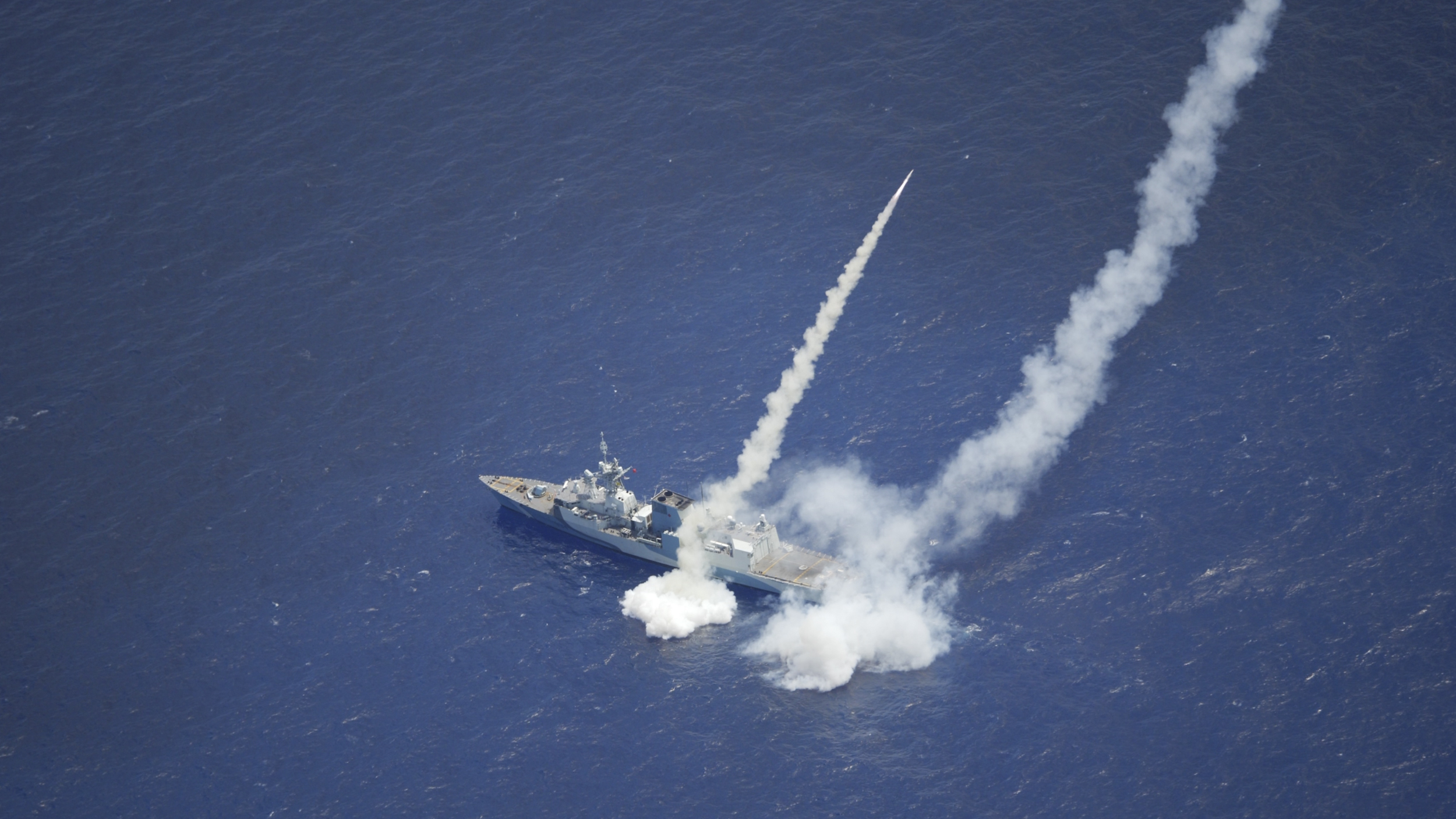
Firing Harpoon missiles

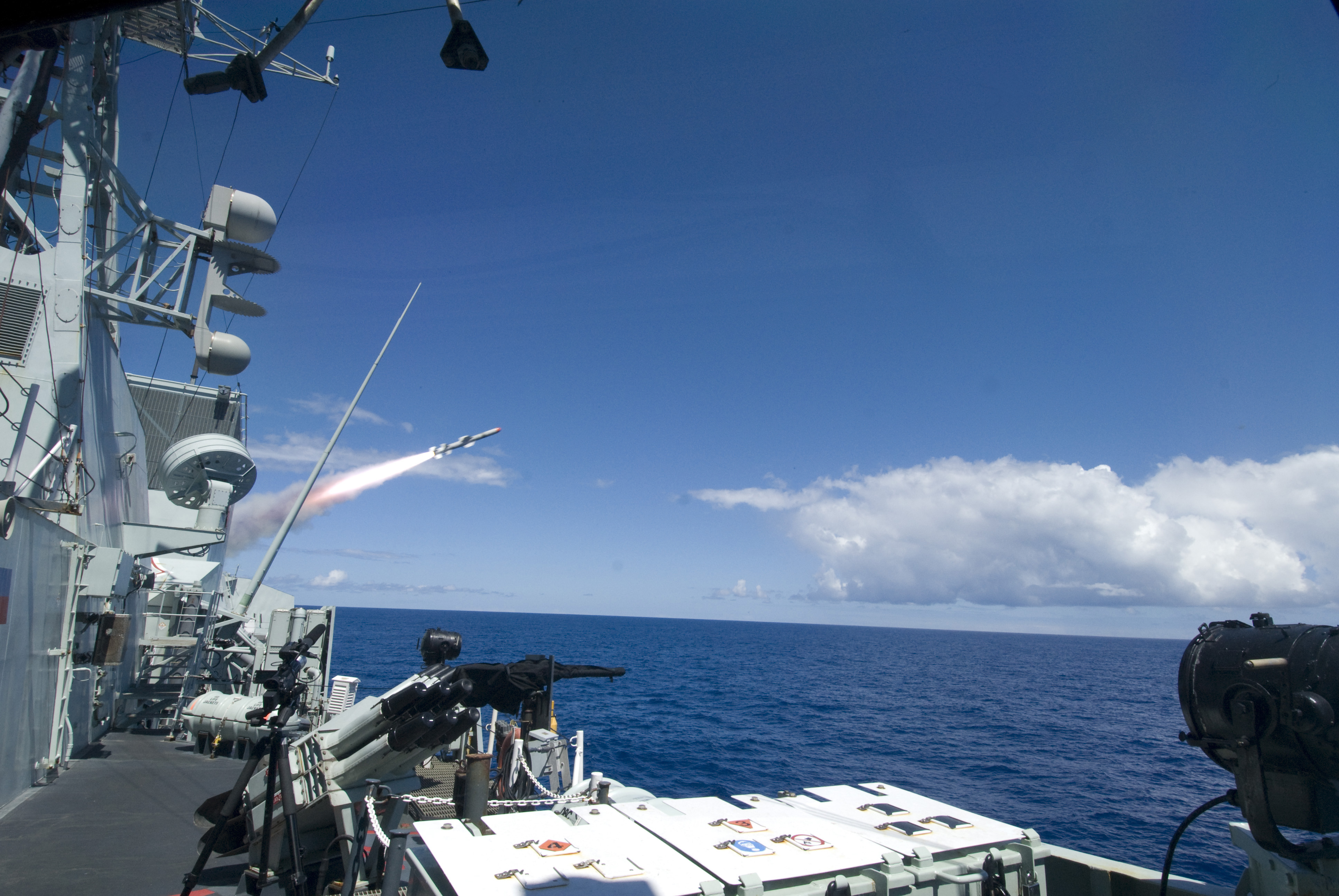
Firing a Harpoon anti-ship missile during a Rim of the Pacific naval exercise

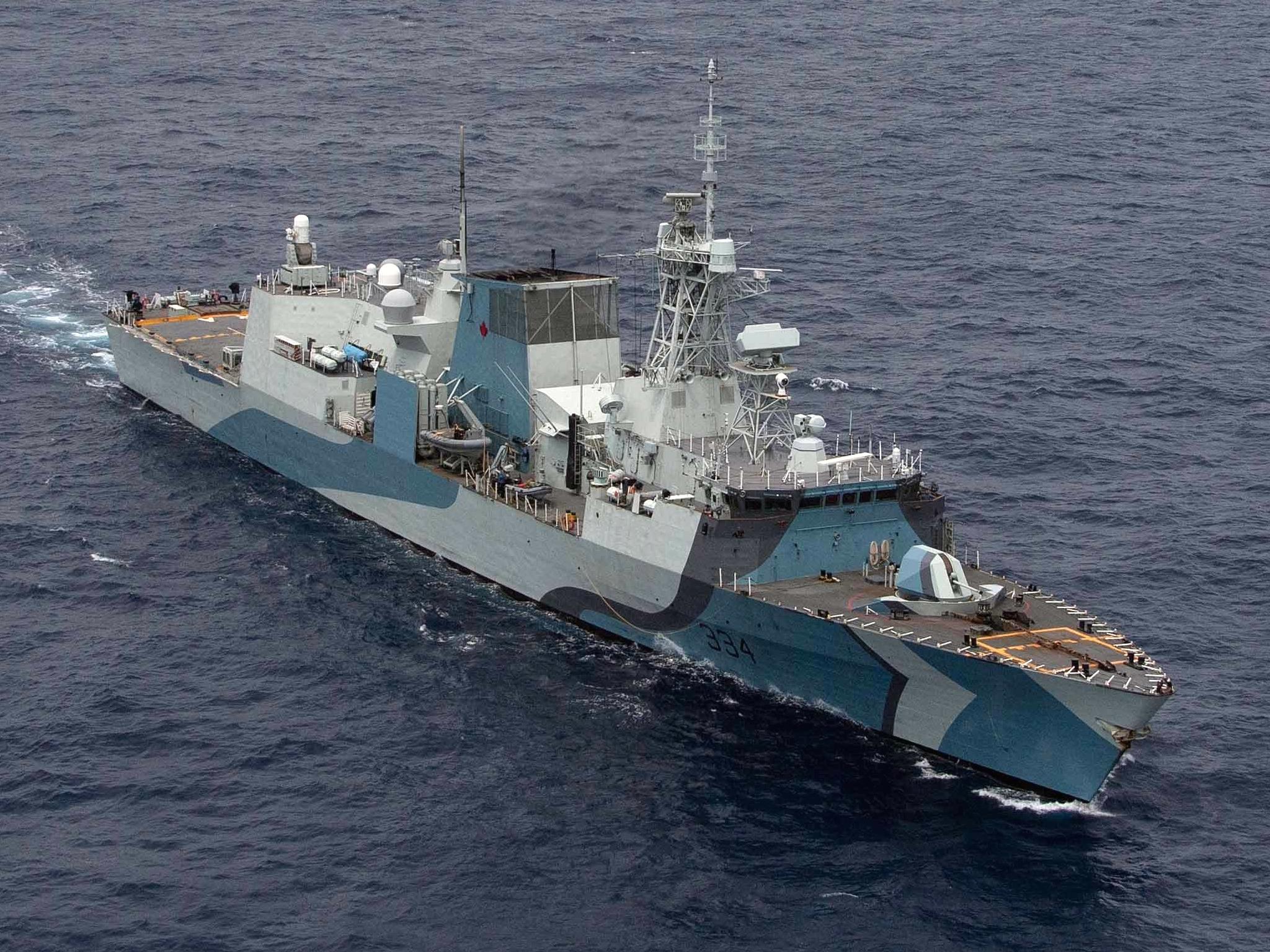
Regina wearing a commemorative "dazzle" camouflage, in August 2020.

Regina was laid down on 6 October 1989 by Marine Industries at Sorel, Quebec and launched on 25 October 1991. The ship was provisionally accepted on 2 March 1994, and following sea trials, sailed to CFB Esquimalt. The frigate was commissioned into the Canadian Forces there on 30 September 1994 and carries the hull classification symbol FFH 334.

In May 1995, with sister ship Vancouver, Regina sailed to Southeast Asia for naval exercises. The following year in March, this time with the auxiliary ship Protecteur, the destroyer Algonquin and frigate Winnipeg, Regina returned to the Eastern Pacific for naval exercises. During this trip the ship visited Ho Chi Minh City, Vietnam, the first North American warship to do so since the Vietnam War. On the return trip, the task group participated in the RIMPAC naval exercise off the coast of Hawaii. In February 1997, the ship sailed to join a United States Navy carrier battle group in the Persian Gulf to enforce trade sanctions on Iraq. The ship returned to the Persian Gulf from June to December 1999 with the USS Constellation carrier battle group to enforce sanctions again. In February 2003, Regina deployed to the Indian Ocean as part of Operation Apollo in support of the War in Afghanistan. The ship remained in theatre until May.

Regina sailed from Esquimalt on 3 July 2012 to the Arabian Sea and joined Combined Task Force 150 on 21 August. She returned home on 14 March 2013.

In 2013, Regina visited Manila, Philippines for a goodwill visit to the Philippines. In 2014 Regina operated off the coast of Somalia as part of Operation Artemis. On 30 April 2014 the Canadian government announced that Regina would be dispatched to assist in NATO operations, concerning the crisis in Ukraine. The frigate began her FELEX refit in May 2015 and returned to service on 29 April 2016 at CFB Esquimalt.

On 6 February 2019, Regina and Asterix departed Esquimalt for Pacific operations with other nations' navies. On 18 February, a Cyclone helicopter from Regina was attempting to land on Asterix and was damaged in the operation. Regina, Asterix and the damaged Cyclone were redirected to Guam to undergo inspection. No damage was reported to Asterix, and following air tests of the repaired Cyclone, all three ships resumed their deployment. In March 2019, Regina and Asterix parted ways, with Regina deployed to the Middle East as part of Operation Artemis beginning on 26 March. In the Indian Ocean, Regina intercepted a dhow and boarded it, seizing 2,569 kg (5,664 lb) of hashish in 119 bags. As the vessel was international waters, the dhow and its crew were released. The hashish was destroyed. The frigate intercepted a second vessel, this time an unregistered fishing vessel, and seized 3,019 kg (6,656 lb) of hashish in 150 bags. A third seizure took place on 24 April, with 1.5 tonnes (3,300 lb) of hashish and 10.5 kg (23 lb) of heroin netted from a stateless fishing vessel in international waters off Oman and Yemen. The frigate then took part in exercises with a French task force including the French aircraft carrier Charles de Gaulle, followed up by a fourth seizure of 2,054 kg (4,528 lb) of hashish on 3 May. On 18 June Regina transited the Taiwan Strait as part of a freedom of navigation mission. During the transit alongside Asterix, the ship was "buzzed" by two Chinese Sukhoi Su-30 fighter aircraft when they flew at a height of 30 metres (100 ft) within 300 metres (980 ft) of the frigate. The vessel returned to Canada on 19 August 2019 having participated in enforcing United Nations sanctions on North Korea and participating in Operation Talisman Sabre 19, a biennial naval exercise with the United States and Australian navies.

In November 2019, Regina received a new "dazzle camouflage" in 1944 colours to commemorate the 75th anniversary of the Battle of the Atlantic.

On 29 August 2020, Regina fired two Harpoon missiles for SINKEX of RIMPAC 2020.

In July 2024 Regina made its first-ever Arctic patrol when it sailed to the Bering Strait for an encounter with the Chinese polar research vessel Xue Long 2, in response to "global competitors that are increasingly probing Canadian infrastructure and gathering intelligence in a warming Arctic." The encounter was "safe and professional".
