= HMCS Winnipeg (FFH 338) =

Royal Canadian Navy frigate

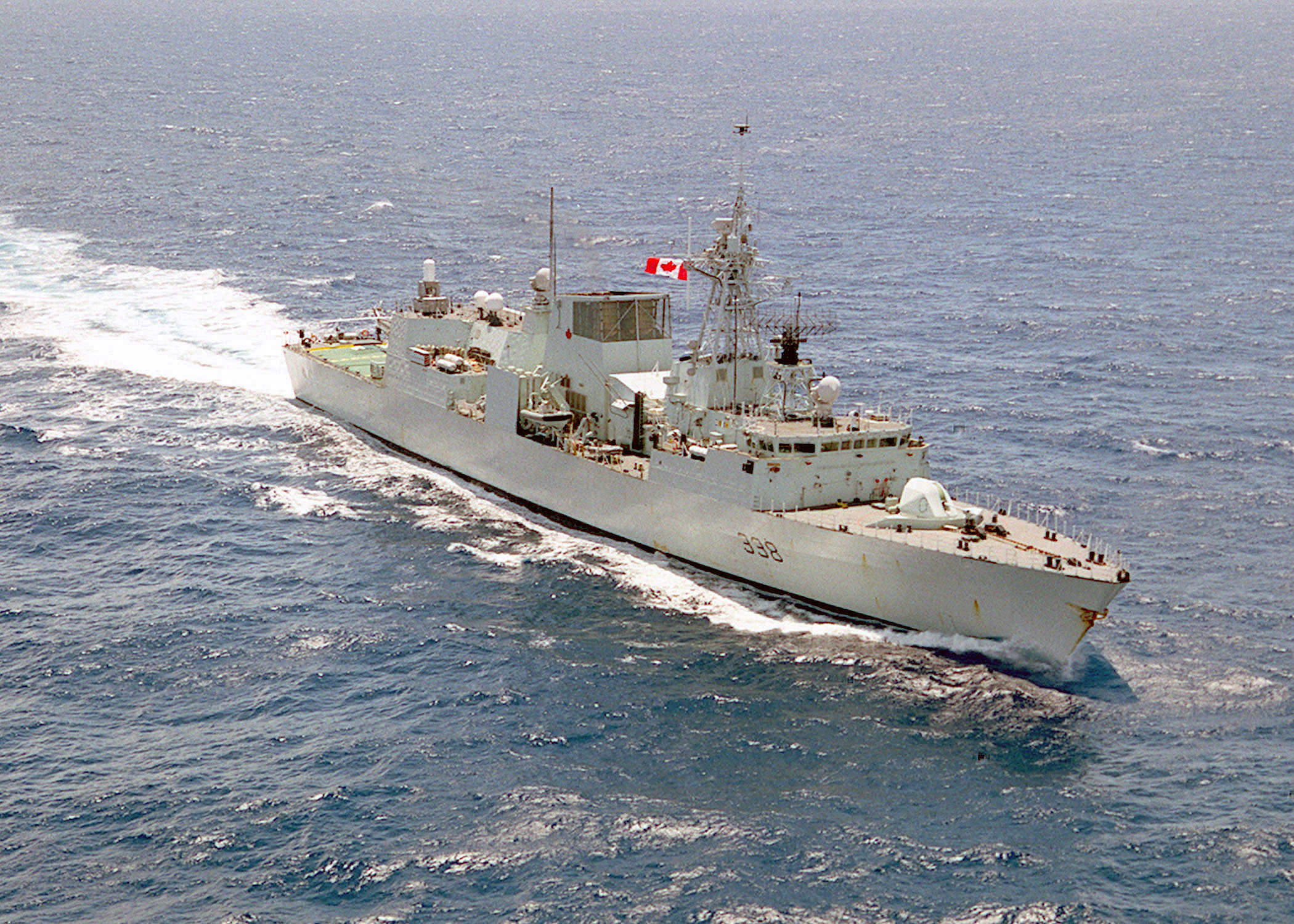
- HMCS Winnipeg underway in 2001

History

Canada
- Name: Winnipeg
- Namesake: Winnipeg, Manitoba
- Builder: Saint John Shipbuilding Ltd., Saint John
- Laid down: 20 March 1993
- Launched: 5 December 1994
- Commissioned: 23 June 1995
- Refit: HCM/FELEX April 2012 – April 2013
- Home port: CFB Esquimalt
- Identification: MMSI number: 316147000; Callsign: CGAI
- Motto: Unum Cum Virtute Multorum (One with the strength of many)
- Honours and awards: Atlantic 1943–45, Arabian Sea
- Status: in active service
- Badge: Azure, a Bison passant, Or.

General characteristics
- Class & type: Halifax-class frigate
- Displacement: 3,995 metric tons (3,932 long tons) (light); 4,795 metric tons (4,719 long tons) (operational); 5,032 metric tons (4,953 long tons) (deep load)
- Length: 134.2 m (440 ft 3 in)
- Beam: 16.5 m (54 ft 2 in)
- Draught: 7.1 m (23 ft 4 in)
- Propulsion: 2 × LM2500 gas turbines; 1 × SEMT Pielstick diesel engine
- Speed: 30 knots (35 mph; 56 km/h)
- Range: 9,500 nmi (17,600 km; 10,900 mi)
- Complement: 255 (including air detachment)
- Armament: Missiles; 2 × quad Mk 141 canisters for 8 × RGM-84 Harpoon block II AShM/LAM; 2 × 8-cell Mk 48 vertical launch system firing 16 × RIM-162 Evolved Sea Sparrow block II SAM/SSM; Guns; 1 × Bofors 57 mm Mk3 gun; 1 × Phalanx CIWS Mk 15 Mod 21 block 1B; 4 × .50-calibre M2HQ Mini Typhoon NRWS; Torpedoes; 2 × twin 324 mm (12.8 in) Mk 32 torpedo tubes for 24 × Honeywell Mk 46 Mod 5 torpedoes
- Aircraft carried: 1 × CH-148 Cyclone

HMCS Winnipeg is a Halifax-class frigate that has served in the Royal Canadian Navy since 1996. Winnipeg is the ninth ship in her class, whose design emerged from the Canadian Patrol Frigate Project. She is the second Canadian warship to carry the name HMCS Winnipeg. Winnipeg serves on Canadian Forces MARPAC missions protecting Canada's sovereignty in the Pacific Ocean and the Arctic Ocean and in enforcing Canadian laws on its territorial oceans and Exclusive Economic Zone. The vessel has been deployed on missions throughout the Pacific, and also to the Indian Ocean; specifically on anti-terrorism operations in the Persian Gulf and the Arabian Sea, and counter-piracy operations off the coast of Somalia. The ship is assigned to the Maritime Forces Pacific (MARPAC), and she has her home port at the Canadian Forces Maritime Base at Esquimalt.

== Description and design ==
The Halifax-class frigate design, emerging from the Canadian Patrol Frigate Project, was ordered by the Canadian Forces in 1977 as a replacement for the aging St. Laurent, Restigouche, Mackenzie, and Annapolis classes of destroyer escorts, which were all tasked with anti-submarine warfare. Winnipeg was ordered in December 1987 as part of the second batch of frigates. To reflect the changing long-term strategy of the Navy during the 1980s and 1990s, the Halifax-class frigates were designed as general purpose warships with particular focus on anti-submarine capabilities.

As built, the Halifax-class vessels displaced 4,750 long tons (4,830 t) and were 134.65 metres (441 ft 9 in) long overall and 124.49 metres (408 ft 5 in) between perpendiculars with a beam of 16.36 metres (53 ft 8 in) and a draught of 4.98 metres (16 ft 4 in). That made them slightly larger than the Iroquois-class destroyers. The vessels are propelled by two shafts with Escher Wyss controllable pitch propellers driven by a CODOG system of two General Electric LM2500 gas turbines, generating 47,500 shaft horsepower (35,400 kW) and one SEMT Pielstick 20 PA6 V 280 diesel engine, generating 8,800 shaft horsepower (6,600 kW).

This gives the frigates a maximum speed of 29 knots (54 km/h; 33 mph) and a range of 7,000 nautical miles (13,000 km; 8,100 mi) at 15 knots (28 km/h; 17 mph) while using their diesel engines. Using their gas turbines, the ships have a range of 3,930 nautical miles (7,280 km; 4,520 mi) at 18 knots (33 km/h; 21 mph). The Halifax class have a complement of 198 naval personnel of which 17 are officers and 17 aircrew of which 8 are officers.

=== Armament and aircraft ===
As built the Halifax-class vessels deployed the CH-124 Sea King helicopter, which acted in concert with shipboard sensors to seek out and destroy submarines at long distances from the ships. The ships have a helicopter deck fitted with a "bear trap" system allowing the launch and recovery of helicopters in up to sea state 6. The Halifax class also carries a close-in anti-submarine weapon in the form of the Mark 46 torpedo, launched from twin Mark 32 Mod 9 torpedo tubes in launcher compartments either side of the forward end of the helicopter hangar.

As built, the anti-shipping role is supported by the RGM-84 Harpoon Block 1C surface-to-surface missile, mounted in two quadruple launch tubes at the main deck level between the funnel and the helicopter hangar. For anti-aircraft self-defence the ships are armed with the Sea Sparrow vertical launch surface-to-air missile in two Mk 48 Mod 0 eight-cell launchers placed to port and starboard of the funnel. The vessels carry 16 missiles. A Raytheon/General Dynamics Phalanx Mark 15 Mod 21 Close-In Weapon System (CIWS) is mounted on top of the helicopter hangar for "last-ditch" defence against targets that evade the Sea Sparrow.

As built, the main gun on the forecastle is a 57 mm (2.2 in)/70 calibre Mark 2 gun from Bofors. (Note: The 70 calibre denotes the length of the gun. This means that the length of the gun barrel is 70 times the bore diameter.) The gun is capable of firing 2.4-kilogram (5.3 lb) shells at a rate of 220 rounds per minute at a range of more than 17 kilometres (11 mi). The vessels also carry eight 12.7 mm (0.50 in) machine guns.

=== Countermeasures and sensors ===
As built, the decoy system comprises Two BAE Systems Shield Mark 2 decoy launchers which fire chaff to 2 kilometres (1.2 mi) and infrared rockets to 169 metres (185 yd) in distraction, confusion and centroid seduction modes. The torpedo decoy is the AN/SLQ-25A Nixie towed acoustic decoy from Argon ST. The ship's radar warning receiver, the CANEWS (Canadian Electronic Warfare System), SLQ-501, and the radar jammer, SLQ-505, were developed by Thorn and Lockheed Martin Canada.

Two Thales Nederland (formerly Signaal) SPG-503 (STIR 1.8) fire control radars are installed one on the roof of the bridge and one on the raised radar platform immediately forward of the helicopter hangar. The ship is also fitted with Raytheon AN/SPS-49(V)5 long-range active air search radar operating at C and D bands, Ericsson HC150 Sea Giraffe medium-range air and surface search radar operating at G and H bands, and Kelvin Hughes Type 1007 I-band navigation radar. The sonar suite includes the CANTASS Canadian Towed Array and GD-C AN/SQS-510 hull mounted sonar and incorporates an acoustic range prediction system. The sonobuoy processing system is the GD-C AN/UYS-503.

=== Modernization ===
The Halifax class underwent a modernization program, known as the Halifax Class Modernization (HCM) program, in order to update the frigates' capabilities in combatting modern smaller, faster and more mobile threats. This involved upgrading the command and control, radar, communications, electronic warfare and armament systems. Further improvements, such as modifying the vessel to accommodate the new Sikorsky CH-148 Cyclone helicopter and satellite links will be done separately from the main Frigate Equipment Life Extension (FELEX) program.

The FELEX program comprised upgrading the combat systems integration to CMS330. The SPS-49 2D long range air search radar was replaced by the Thales Nederland SMART-S Mk 2 E/F-band 3D surveillance radar, and the two STIR 1.8 fire control radars were replaced by a pair of Saab Ceros 200 fire control radars. A Telephonics IFF Mode 5/S interrogator was installed and the Elisra NS9003A-V2HC ESM system replaced the SLQ-501 CANEWS. An IBM multi-link (Link 11, Link 16 and Link 22 enabled) datalink processing system was installed along with two Raytheon Anschütz Pathfinder Mk II navigation radars. Furthermore, Rheinmetall's Multi-Ammunition Soft kill System (MASS), known as MASS DUERAS was introduced to replace the Plessey Shield decoy system. The existing 57 mm Mk 2 guns were upgraded to the Mk 3 standard and the Harpoon missiles were improved to Block II levels, the Phalanx was upgraded to Block 1B and the obsolete Sea Sparrow system was replaced by the Evolved Sea Sparrow Missile.

== Operational history ==
Winnipeg's keel was laid down on 20 March 1993 by Saint John Shipbuilding Company at their shipyard in Saint John, New Brunswick. Her engine room modules were constructed at Georgetown, Prince Edward Island and transported to Saint John to be incorporated into the rest of the vessel. The ship was launched on 5 December 1993. The vessel departed Halifax, Nova Scotia on 16 January 1995, sailing to the West Coast of Canada. Arriving at Esquimalt, British Columbia, the warship was commissioned into the Canadian Forces on 23 June 1995, and carries the hull classification symbol FFH 338.

In 1996, Winnipeg participated in the multi-national naval exercise RIMPAC 96 in coastal waters off Hawaii. Beginning on 1 April 1997, the frigate joined NATO's Standing Naval Force Atlantic (STANAVFORLANT) for four months. In 1998, Winnipeg participated in the South American naval exercise UNITAS. In March 2001, Winnipeg integrated into the USS Constellation Carrier Battle Group in the Persian Gulf. As part of the carrier battle group, the frigate enforced sanctions against Iraq for six months, returning to Esquimalt on 14 September.

The frigate was deployed as part of Operation Apollo, Canada's contribution to the War in Afghanistan. The ship was in theatre from 15 September 2002 to 2 May 2003 performing fleet support missions and maritime interdiction operations.

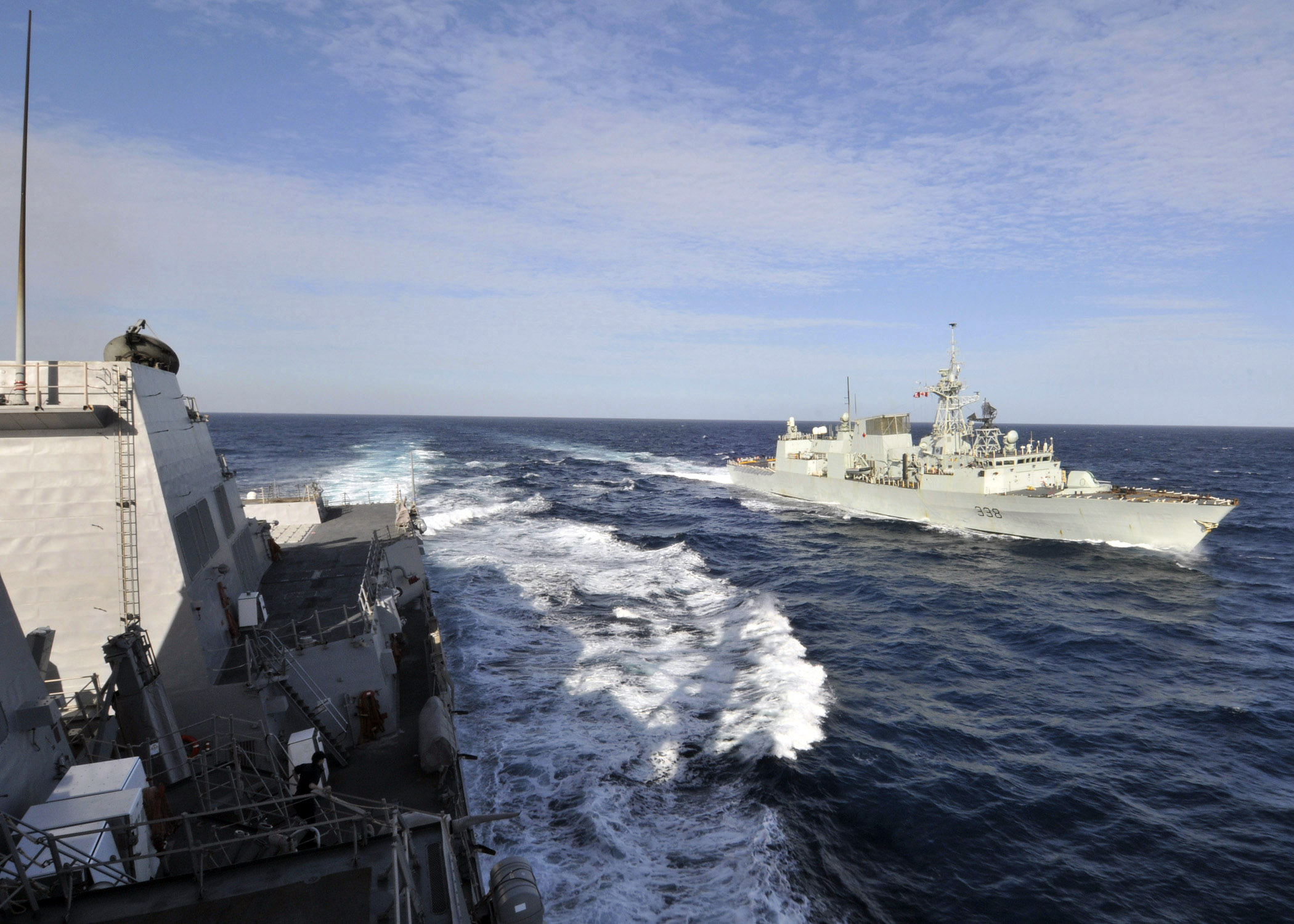
Winnipeg performing underway replenishment training with the destroyer USS Mustin

In April 2009, Winnipeg was deployed to the Gulf of Aden to escort United Nations ships carrying famine, plague, and overpopulation relief supplies to East Africa for ten weeks. After escorting a World Food program ship, Winnipeg came across a pirate attack on the Norwegian tanker MV Front Ardenne. Winnipeg captured the pirates, but they were later released due to Canadian law preventing prosecution.

On 12 August 2010, the frigate along with HMCS Whitehorse intercepted MV Sun Sea, a Thailand-flagged ship carrying Tamil refugees from Sri Lanka, off the coast of British Columbia.

In April 2012 Winnipeg was turned over to Seaspan Marine Corporation's Victoria Shipyards, to start an 18-month mid-life upgrading and modernization. On 10 April 2013 Winnipeg was returned to the Royal Canadian Navy to finish the midlife refit. On 23 April 2013, Winnipeg was rammed while docked at CFB Esquimalt, by American sea trawler American Dynasty of the American Seafoods Company. Six people were injured. American Dynasty was being towed to the graving dock for repairs when the fishing vessel accelerated and veered to starboard, hitting the frigate. The resulting investigation found fault with the crew of the fishing vessel and their equipment. Winnipeg, accompanied by Calgary, Yellowknife and Brandon, departed in October 2014 to take part the Task Group Exercise with the US and Japanese Navies in American coastal waters.

In January 2015, Winnipeg was deployed in the eastern Pacific as part of Operation Caribbe 2015, part of a joint multinational effort to eliminate illegal trafficking through the waters around Central America and the Caribbean nations. Winnipeg was deployed to Operation Caribbe for three weeks in June, after which the ship transited the Panama Canal to join NATO's Operation Reassurance in the Mediterranean Sea. The ship left the Mediterranean headed towards the Pacific after being relieved by sister ship Fredericton. In January 2016, she made port visits to Penang, the first Royal Canadian Navy ship to do so, and Singapore. Winnipeg returned to Esquimalt on 23 February.

Winnipeg and sister ship Ottawa sailed from Esquimalt on 6 March 2017 for six-month deployment visiting several nations around the Pacific, including Malaysia, India, China and Japan among others, returning on 8 August.

On 14 December 2020, a crewmember was lost overboard off California during the frigate's return from overseas operations. On 16 December, the search for the sailor was called off.

On 17 August 2021 Winnipeg sailed from Esquimalt for a four-month deployment to Asia for multinational surveillance and security missions as part of Operation Projection and Operation Neon. During the deployment, the frigate performed a freedom of navigation sail through the Taiwan Strait alongside the American destroyer USS Dewey. The ship returned to Canada on 15 December.

In 2022, Winnipeg and Vancouver were deployed to the RIMPAC naval exercise off Hawaii. This was followed by Winnipeg visiting several nations in Asia, including a first ever Royal Canadian Navy warship visit to Cambodia, and participation in Japan's international Fleet Review. In 2023, it was announced that damage to the ship suffered in October 2022 to the propellers had limited the vessel's operational capability. The ship entered an extensive maintenance drydocking in January 2024 where the damage was to fixed among other issues aboard the ship.
