= SS Panama (1939) =

American ship

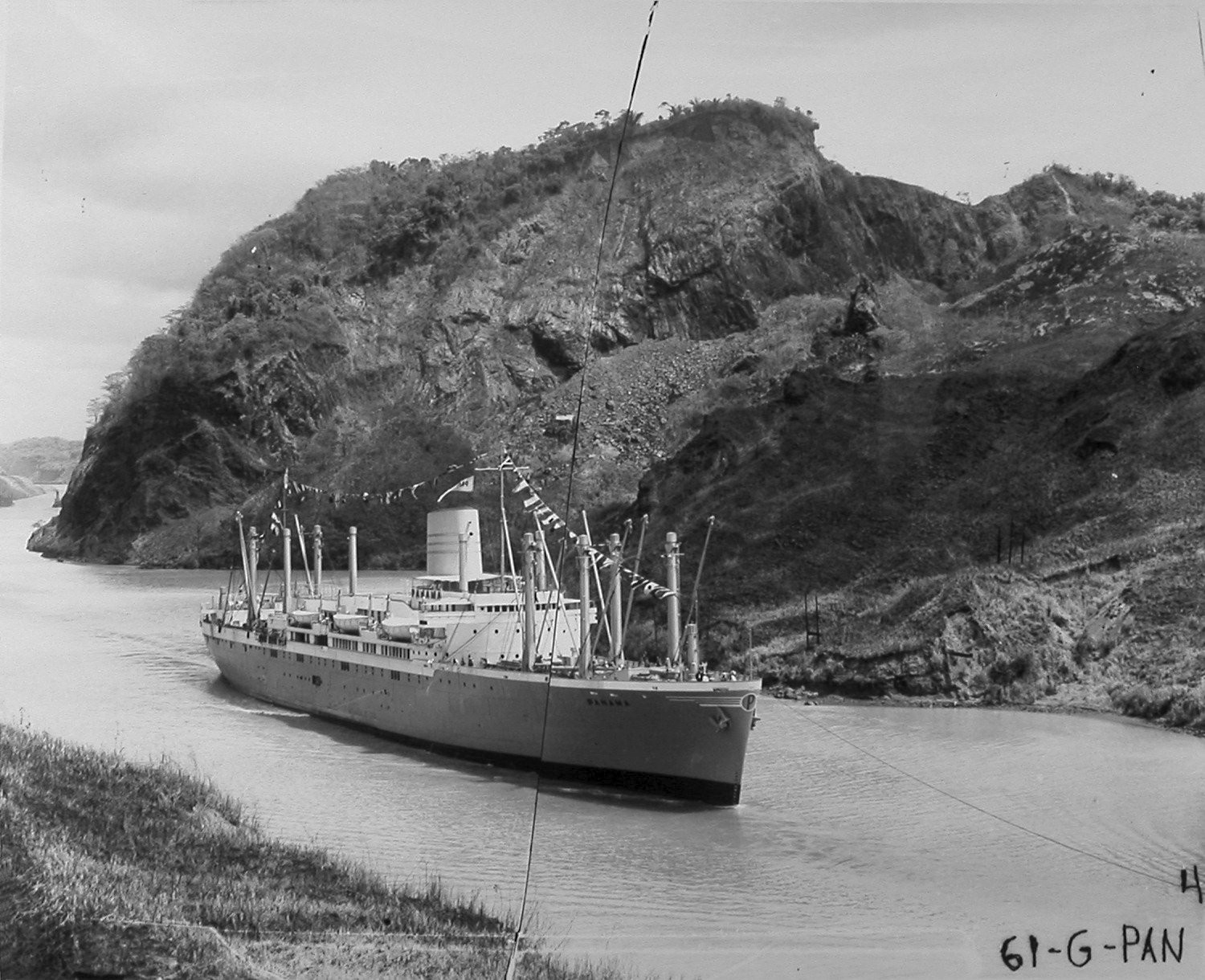
- SS Panama in the Panama Canal, probably on her maiden voyage in 1939

History

United States
- Name: Panama (1939–1941); James Parker (1941–1946); Panama (1946–1957); President Hoover (1957–1965); Regina (1965–1973); Regina Prima (1973–1985)
- Namesake: Panama
- Builder: Bethlehem Shipbuilding Corporation (Quincy, MA)
- Yard number: 1467
- Laid down: 25 October 1937
- Launched: 24 September 1938
- Acquired: 22 April 1939 (delivered)
- Refit: —as troop transport: 1941; —as passenger-cargo ship: 1946
- Identification: Official number: 238343
- Fate: Scrapped, 1985
- Notes: Ship had prospective U.S. Navy designation AP-46, never implemented as ship never transferred to Navy.

General characteristics
- Type: Passenger-cargo steamship
- Tonnage: 10,021 grt; 5,925 nrt
- Displacement: 10,002 t.(lt) 14206 t.(fl)
- Length: 493 ft 6 in (150.42 m)
- Beam: 64 ft 0 in (19.51 m)
- Draft: 26 ft 3 in (8.00 m)
- Installed power: 2 × steam turbines, designed shp 10,000
- Propulsion: Twin screw
- Speed: 17 knots (20 mph; 31 km/h)
- Range: 13,000 miles (21,000 km)
- Capacity: Prewar and postwar: —passengers 216; —cargo 6,000 tons; US Army: —troops 2,324
- Crew: Original: 116; US Army: Unknown; Postwar: 128
- Armament: US Army: 1–4"/50 4-3"/50
- Notes: Special design for Panama Railroad Co.

SS Panama was laid down 25 October 1937 as hull number 1467, launched on 24 September 1938 and completed 22 April 1939 at Bethlehem Shipbuilding Corporation in Quincy Massachusetts. The ship was given the official number 238343 and was owned and operated by the Panama Railroad Company. The ship was built for 202 single class passengers with a crew of 124. Panama was sister ship to USS Ancon (AP-66, later AGC-4) and SS Cristobal.

The Army took over the ship in 1941 and it made trips as the unconverted USAT Panama. It was converted to a troop ship and renamed the USAT James Parker. The Navy designated the ship AP-46 and the armament was manned by Navy personnel but it was never transferred to the Navy. After being transferred back to the original owner the ship ultimately was sold several times being re-flagged to other countries.

== Army acquisitions ==
The Panama was ordered by the United States Maritime Commission to be transferred to the Army on 13 June 1941. After making voyages unaltered the ship was converted at the Atlantic Basin Iron Works at New York in August 1941 and renamed James Parker after Medal of Honor recipient major general James Parker. The Army was quartered on the ship, Merchant Marine seamen operated the ship, and the United States Navy Armed Guard manned the guns.

On one trip, on 28 Dec 1943, the 508th Parachute Infantry Regiment embarked from New York on board the USAT Parker.

== Navy designation ==
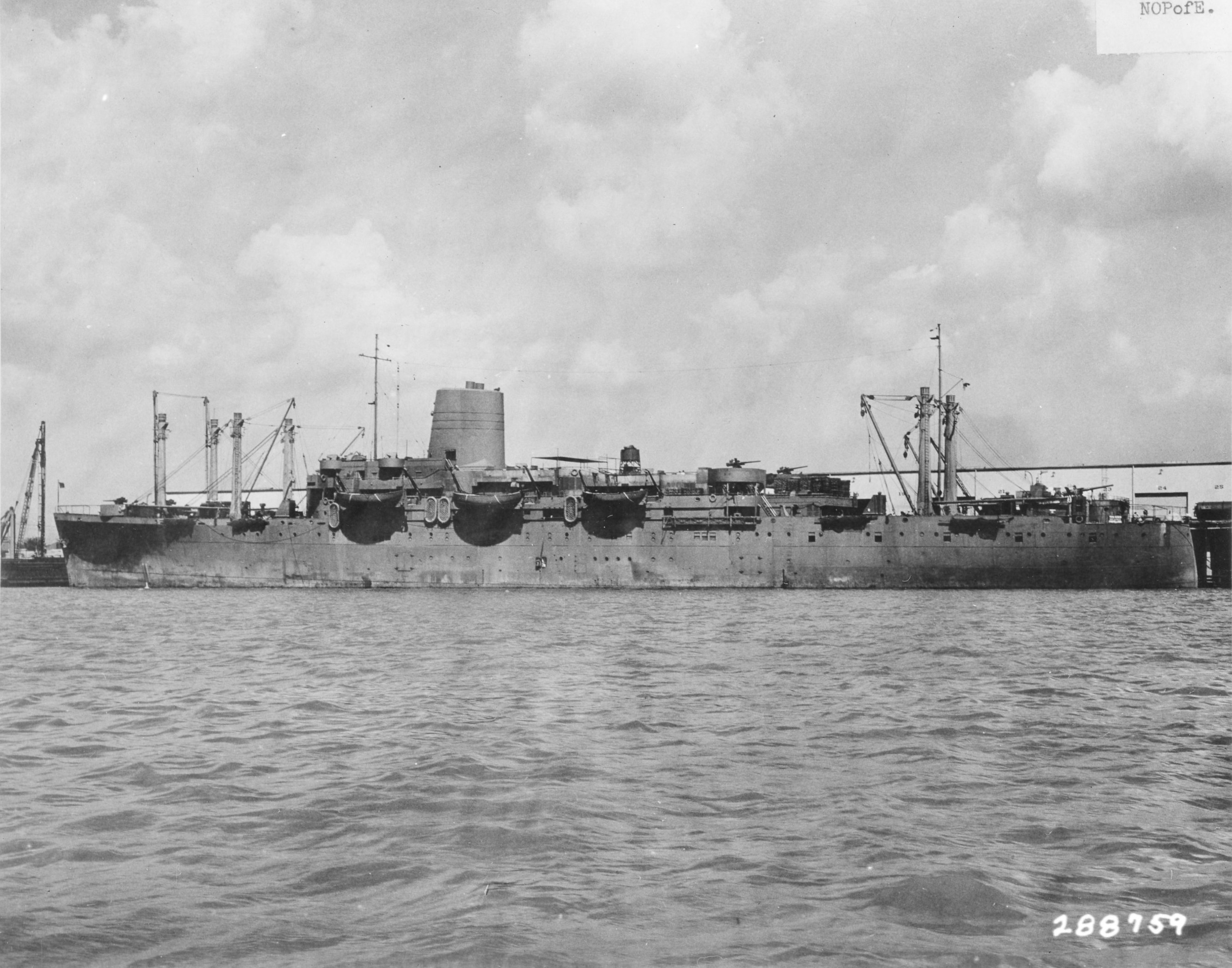
USAT James Parker at New Orleans, October 1942

On 17 September 1941 the Navy, under Presidential directive, informed the Army to convert ten of its ships to combat unit loaded transports as soon as possible. These were to be assigned hull numbers AP-30, 34–35, 42–44, and 46–49. On 29 September 1941 it was declared that six of the seven Army vessels, along with two under construction by the Maritime Commission, were to be assigned hull numbers and taken over by the Navy. The ships were designated AP 42–49 by the end of October 1941. The President Coolidge was on the initial list but was never listed for Navy manning so never received a Navy hull number. The Navy only manned AP 42–43. The James Parker remained in Army service throughout the war instead of entering Navy service as AP-46. Her Navy manning was officially cancelled on 30 Mar 42.

== Final voyages ==
In January 1946 the James Parker was delivered to Bethlehem Steel Company (56th St. Yard) and converted for carrying military dependents until 15 May 1946 when she was redelivered to the Panama Railroad Company, at New York. Also in January 1946 sister ship Cristobal was delivered to Newport News Shipbuilding & Drydock Company and converted. She continued carrying dependents until 14 June 1946.

== Decommissioning and disposal ==
James Parker was decommissioned on 25 February 1946 and transferred to the Maritime Administration, which returned the ship to her original owner. Her name was struck from the Navy List on 17 April 1946.

== Later civilian service ==
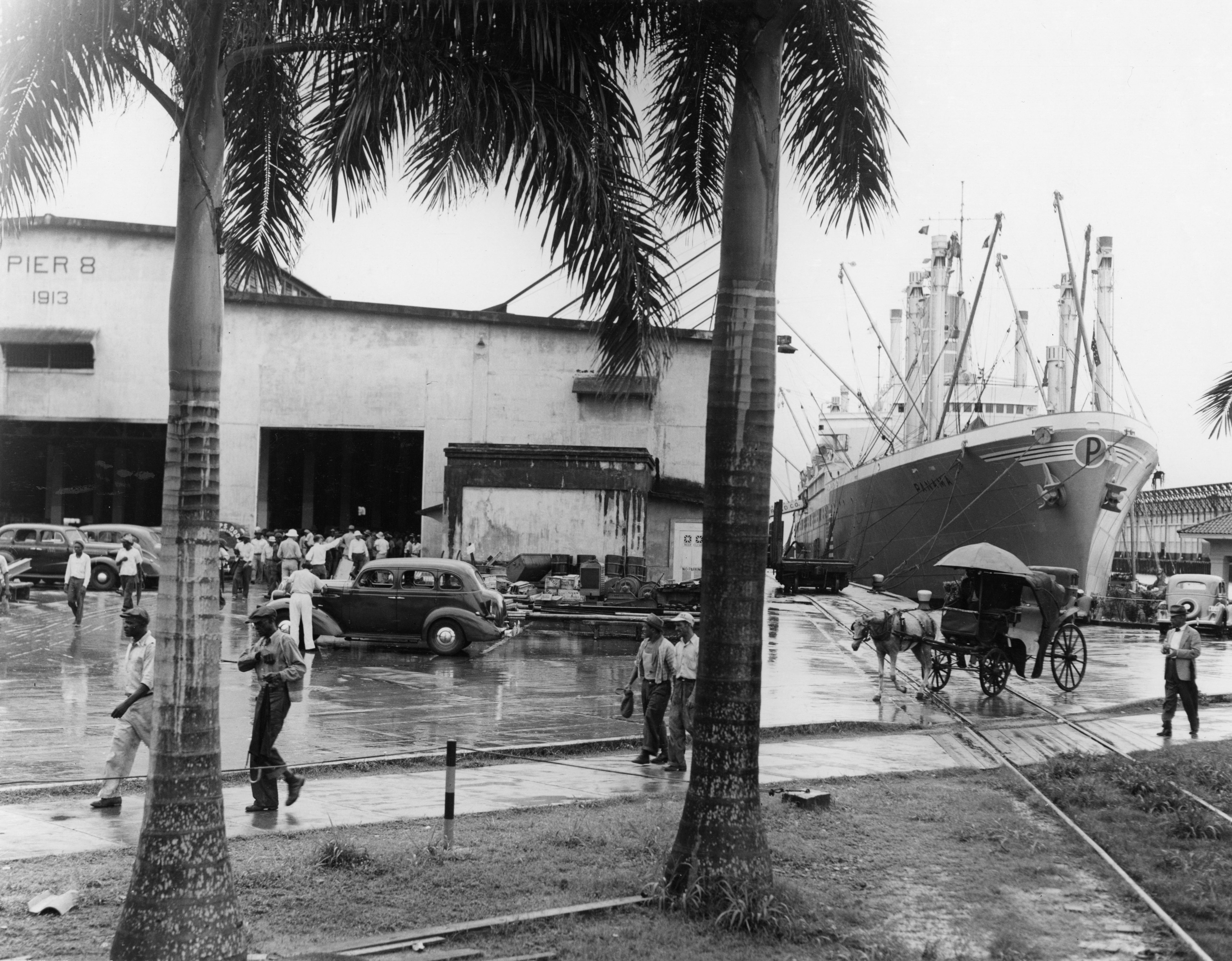
SS Panama at Cristóbal, date unknown

The James Parker was returned to the Panama Railroad Company in 1946, returning to service under her original name, and on her pre-war route of New York to Panama, on 20 September. On 9 January 1957 the liner was sold to American President Lines and renamed SS President Hoover. On 12 February 1964 the ship was sold to the Greek shipping company International Cruises S. A a Chandris Group Company, re-flagged under Greece, and renamed SS Regina. On 24 November 1964 the ship was re-flagged under Panama with the ownership unchanged and renamed SS Regina Prima. The ship was laid up at Piraeus, Greece in 1979 for final disposition and in 1985 towed to Aliağa a town of İzmir Province, Turkey to be broken up and scrapped.
