= Halifax-class frigate =

Class of Canadian frigates

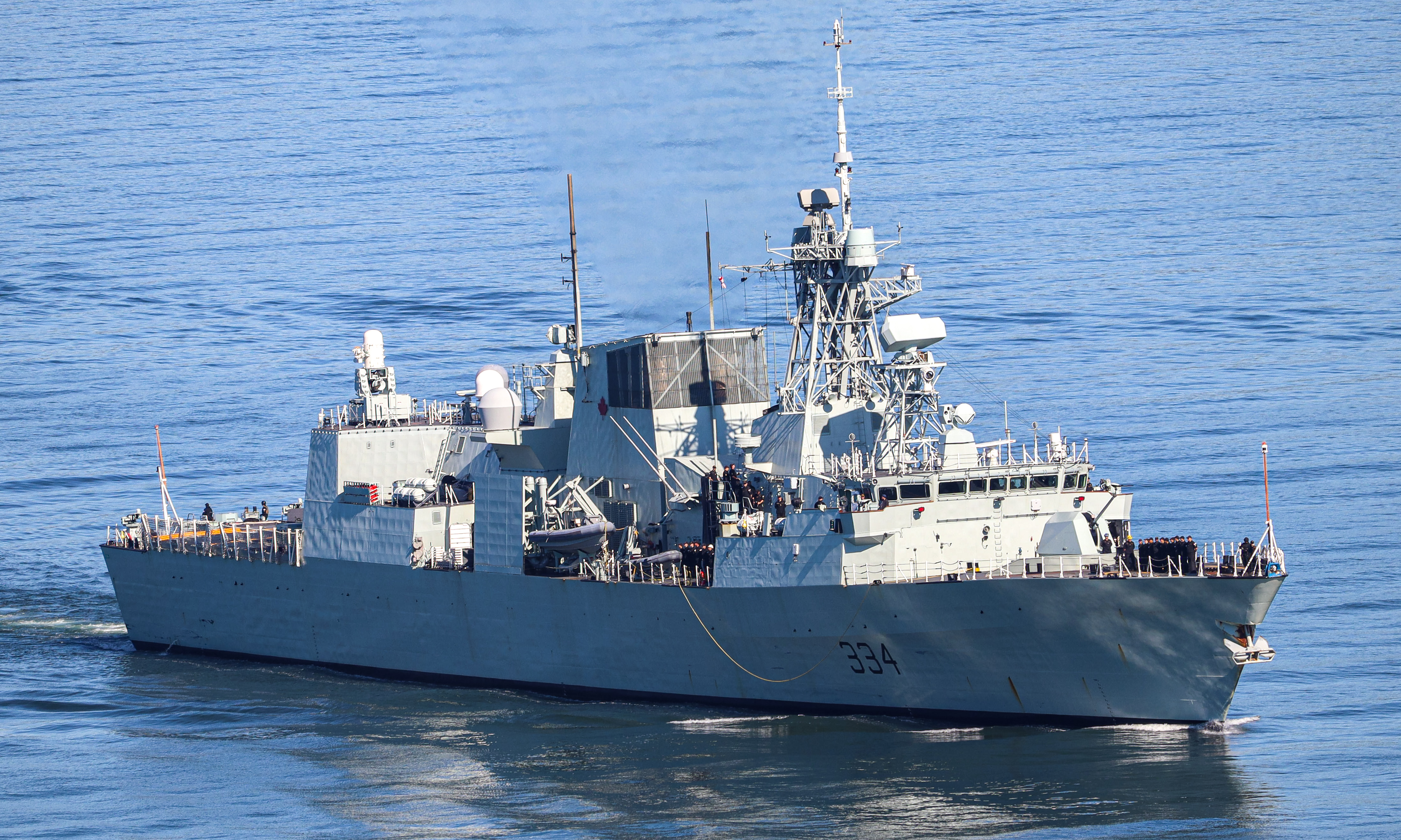
- HMCS Regina in June 2025

Class overview
- Name: Halifax class
- Builders: Saint John Shipbuilding Ltd., Saint John; MIL Davie Shipbuilding, Lauzon
- Operators: Royal Canadian Navy
- Preceded by: Annapolis class
- Succeeded by: River class
- Built: 1987–1996
- In commission: 1992–present
- Completed: 12
- Active: 12

General characteristics
- Type: Guided-missile frigate
- Displacement: 4,735 t (4,660 long tons)
- Length: 134.1 m (440 ft 0 in)
- Beam: 16.4 m (53 ft 10 in)
- Draught: 4.9 m (16 ft 1 in)
- Propulsion: CODOG; 2 × General Electric LM2500 gas turbines, generating 47,500 shp (35,400 kW); 1 × SEMT Pielstick 20PA6V280 diesel engine, generating 8,800 shp (6,600 kW); 1 × Royal de Schelde cross-connect gearbox; 2 × Escher Wyss controllable pitch propellers; 4 × 830 kW Hitzinger generators driven by 4 × C32 ACERT Caterpillar engines
- Speed: 30 knots (56 km/h; 35 mph)
- Range: 9,500 nmi (17,600 km; 10,900 mi)
- Complement: 255
- Sensors & processing systems: Combat management system: Lockheed Martin Canada CMS 330 with integrated Saab 9LV Mk 4 elements; Air/Surface search and surveillance radars: Saab Sea Giraffe AMB 3D and Thales SMART-S Mk 2 3D; Fire control radar: 2 × Saab CEROS-200; Integrated platform management system: L3 MAPPS IPMS; Identification Friend or Foe (IFF) System: Telephonics Mk XII; Electro-optical infrared search and track system: DRS Canada and Thales Nederland Sirius; Tactical data link: SATCOM Link 11, Link 16, Link 22; Active/Passive sonar: GDMS-Canada AN/SQS-510 hull mounted sonar; Towed array sonar: GDMS-Canada TLFAS (variable depth); Sonobuoy processing system: GDMS-Canada AN/UYS-503
- Electronic warfare & decoys: Countermeasure dispensing system: 3 × TKWA/MASS; Electronic warfare suite: AN/SLQ-503 RAMSES (4 × RAMSES radomes); Signals intelligence COMINT and SIGINT Suite: Southwest Research Institute AN/SRD-506; Electronic support measure: Elisra NS9003A-V2HC; Inflatable decoy system: Surface Off-Board Passive Decoy (SOPD); Towed torpedo countermeasure: Argon ST AN/SLQ-25 Nixie
- Armament: 2 × quad Mk 141 canisters for 8 × RGM-84 Harpoon block II missiles AShM/LAM; 2 × 8-cell Mk 48 vertical launch system (VLS) firing 16 × RIM-162 Evolved Sea Sparrow block II SAM/SSM; 1 × Bofors 57 mm (2.2 in) Mk 3 gun; 1 × Phalanx CIWS (Mk 15 Mod 21 (Block 1B)); 4 × 12.7 mm (0.50 in) M2HQ Mini Typhoon remote weapon stations; 2 × twin 324 mm (12.8 in) Mk 32 torpedo tubes for 24 × Honeywell Mk 46 Mod 5 torpedoes
- Aircraft carried: 1 × CH-148 Cyclone helicopter armed with: 2 × Mk 54 lightweight torpedoes; 1 × C6 FLEX 7.62 mm (0.30 in) GPMG
- Aviation facilities: Landing pad with recovery assist, secure and traverse system (RAST); Hangar
- Notes: Government of Canada is acquiring up to six uncrewed aircraft system (UAS) to provide over the horizon situational awareness, intelligence, and targeting capabilities to the class.

The Halifax-class frigates are a class of multi-role patrol frigates operated by the Royal Canadian Navy since 1992. The class is the outcome of the Canadian Patrol Frigate Project, which originated in the mid-1970s. HMCS Halifax was the first of twelve Canadian designed and built vessels which combine traditional anti-submarine capabilities with systems to deal with surface and air threats as well. The ships are named after Canadian provincial capitals (St. John's, Halifax, Charlottetown, Fredericton, Québec City, Toronto, Winnipeg, and Regina), the capital of Canada, and the major cities Calgary, Montreal, and Vancouver.

In 2007, the Government of Canada announced a planned refit of the Halifax class which is known as the Halifax Class Modernization Project (HCMP) of which the Frigate Equipment Life Extension (FELEX) project is a part. In November 2008, a Lockheed Martin Canada-led team including Saab AB, Elisra, IBM Canada, CAE Professional Services, L-3 Electronic Systems and xwave, was awarded the contract. The construction phase of the program was completed in November 2016. As of May 2021, the Halifax-class modernization program was being closed out, but full operational capacity was reached on 31 January 2018.

In October 2011 the Canadian government launched the National Shipbuilding Procurement Strategy which aims to replace the Halifax class, as well as the capabilities of the Iroquois-class destroyers, with up to 15 new River-class destroyers. This replacement class is currently in full-rate production which began on 25 April 2025. However, the Halifax-class vessels continue to be upgraded with at least some ships of the class anticipated as likely to continue service into the 2040s.

== Description and design ==
The Halifax-class frigate design, emerging from the Canadian Patrol Frigate Program, was ordered by the Canadian Forces in 1977 as a replacement for the aging St. Laurent, Restigouche, Mackenzie, and Annapolis classes of destroyer escorts, which were all tasked with anti-submarine warfare. In July 1983, the federal government approved the budget for the design and construction of the first batch of six frigates, with a second batch ordered in December 1987. To reflect the changing long-term strategy of the Navy during the 1980s and 1990s, the Halifax-class frigates was designed as a general purpose warship with particular focus on anti-submarine capabilities.

As built, the Halifax-class vessels displaced 4,750 long tons (4,830 t) and were 134.65 metres (441 ft 9 in) long overall and 124.49 metres (408 ft 5 in) between perpendiculars with a beam of 16.36 metres (53 ft 8 in) and a draught of 4.98 metres (16 ft 4 in). That made them slightly larger than the Iroquois-class destroyers. The vessels are propelled by two shafts with Escher Wyss controllable pitch propellers driven by a CODOG system of two General Electric LM2500 gas turbines, generating 47,500 shaft horsepower (35,400 kW) and one SEMT Pielstick 20 PA6 V 280 diesel engine, generating 8,800 shaft horsepower (6,600 kW).

This gives the frigates a maximum speed of 29 knots (54 km/h; 33 mph) and a range of 7,000 nautical miles (13,000 km; 8,100 mi) at 15 knots (28 km/h; 17 mph) while using their diesel engines. Using their gas turbines, the ships have a range of 3,930 nautical miles (7,280 km; 4,520 mi) at 18 knots (33 km/h; 21 mph). As designed the Halifax class had a total complement 236 personnel; 219 naval personnel of which 17 were officers and 17 aircrew of which 8 were officers. During the FELEX/HCM projects the addition of 19 berths was completed to allow embarkation of additional CTG personnel. This brought the total available crew complement to 255 persons.

=== Control systems ===
The tactical command and control systems were developed in Canada. These included the Shipboard Integrated Communications System (SHINCOM), the Shipboard Integrated Machinery Control (SHINMACS), and Shipboard Integrated Processing and Display System (SHINPADS). SHINCOM was developed by DRS Technology Canada and was exported to other navies. SHINMACS was developed by CAE. SHINPADS was developed by Sperry Computer Systems in Winnipeg. with technical assistance from the United States. It used a revolutionary redundant and distributed computer architecture which was exported for use in US military control systems.

=== Armament and aircraft ===
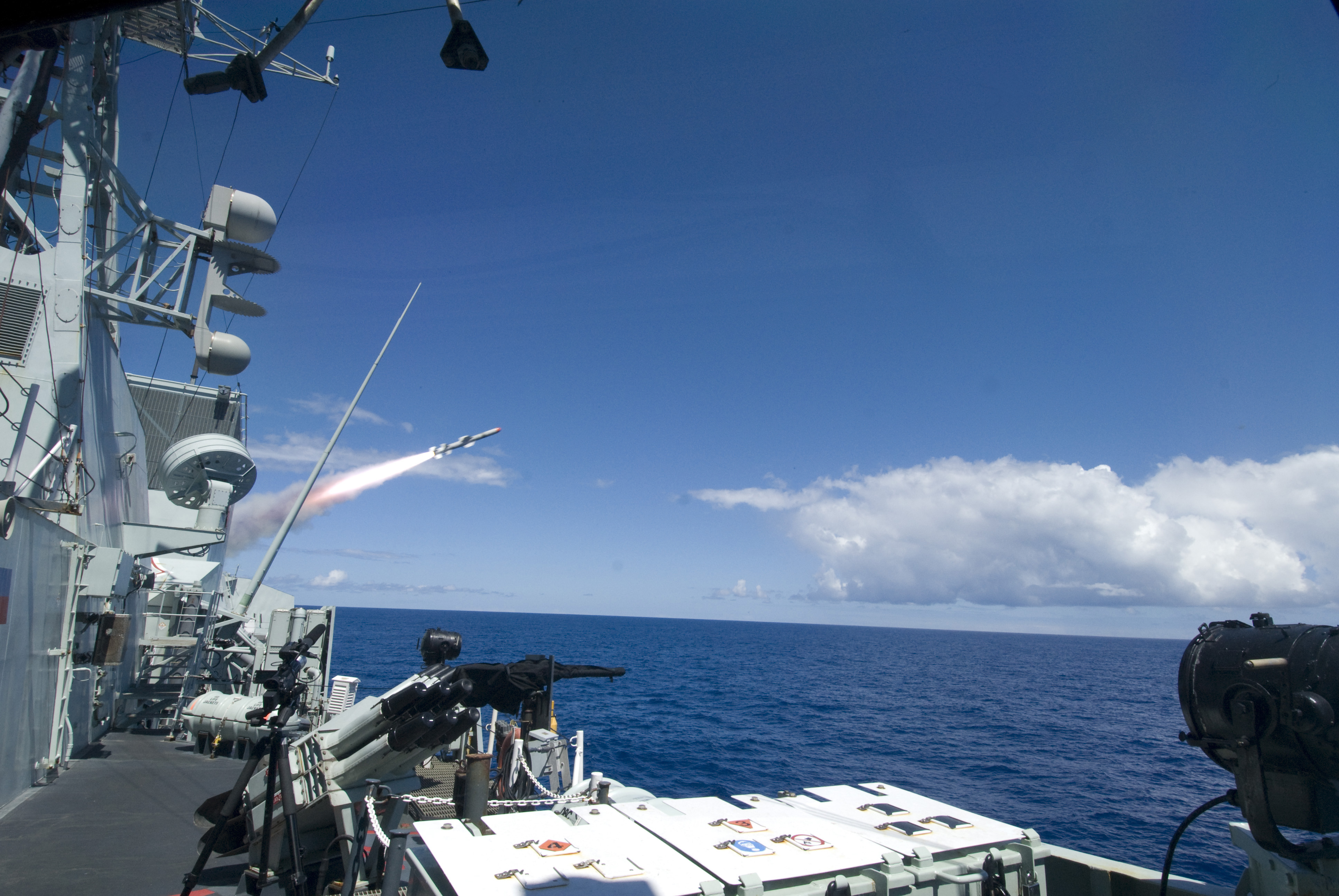
HMCS Regina fires a Harpoon missile

As built the Halifax-class vessels deployed the CH-124 Sea King helicopter, which acted in concert with shipboard sensors to seek out and destroy submarines at long distances from the ships. The ships have a helicopter deck fitted with a "bear trap" system allowing the launch and recovery of helicopters in up to sea state 6. The Halifax class also carries a close-in anti-submarine weapon in the form of the Mark 46 torpedo, launched from twin Mark 32 Mod 9 torpedo tubes in launcher compartments on either side of the forward end of the helicopter hangar.

As built, the anti-shipping role is supported by the RGM-84 Harpoon Block 1C surface-to-surface missile, mounted in two quadruple launch tubes at the main deck level between the funnel and the helicopter hangar. For anti-aircraft self-defence the ships are armed with the Sea Sparrow vertical launch surface-to-air missile in two Mk 48 Mod 0 eight-cell launchers placed to port and starboard of the funnel. The vessels carry 16 missiles. A Raytheon/General Dynamics Phalanx Mark 15 Mod 21 close-in weapon system (CIWS) is mounted on top of the helicopter hangar for "last-ditch" defence against targets that evade the Sea Sparrow.

As built, the main gun on the forecastle is a 57 mm (2.2 in)/70 calibre Mark 2 gun from Bofors. (Note: The /70 after the calibre denotes the length of the gun. This means that the length of the gun barrel is 70 times the bore diameter.) The gun is capable of firing 2.4-kilogram (5.3 lb) shells at a rate of 220 rounds per minute at a range of more than 17 kilometres (11 mi). The vessels also carry eight 12.7 mm (0.50 in) machine guns.

=== Countermeasures and sensors ===
As built, the decoy system comprises two BAE Systems Shield Mark 2 decoy launchers which fire chaff to 2 kilometres (1.2 mi) and infrared rockets to 169 metres (185 yd) in distraction, confusion and centroid seduction modes. The torpedo decoy is the AN/SLQ-25A Nixie towed acoustic decoy from Argon ST. The ship's radar warning receiver, the CANEWS (Canadian Electronic Warfare System), SLQ-501, and the radar jammer, SLQ-505, were developed by Thorn and Lockheed Martin Canada. Two Thales Nederland (formerly Signaal) SPG-503 (STIR 1.8) fire control radars are installed one on the roof of the bridge and one on the raised radar platform immediately forward of the helicopter hangar. The ship is also fitted with Raytheon AN/SPS-49(V)5 long-range active air search radar operating at C and D bands, Ericsson HC150 Sea Giraffe medium-range air and surface search radar operating at G and H bands, and Kelvin Hughes Type 1007 I-band navigation radar. The sonar suite includes the CANTASS Canadian Towed Array and GD-C AN/SQS-510 hull-mounted sonar and incorporates an acoustic range prediction system. The sonobuoy processing system is the GD-C AN/UYS-503.

== Refit ==
The Government of Canada announced on 5 July 2007 a $3.1 billion refit program for the Halifax class which would take place from 2010 to 2018 and extend the ships' service lives through to the 2030s. The total cost of the program was set at $4.3 billion, with $2 billion for combat systems upgrades and $1.2 billion for mid-life refits. A further $1 billion was paid to contractors for other projects.

Faced with delays and restrictions from the International Traffic in Arms Regulations, the Navy opted to modernize the Halifax class using as much non-American equipment as possible, including technology from Canada, Sweden, Germany, Netherlands and Israel. The International Traffic in Arms Regulations has also been blamed for the delay of the CH-148 Cyclone which was running two years behind the original schedule. The Halifax class received state of the art equipment able to handle modern threats through 2030. The modernization includes passive and active weapons, radars, and new combat architecture.

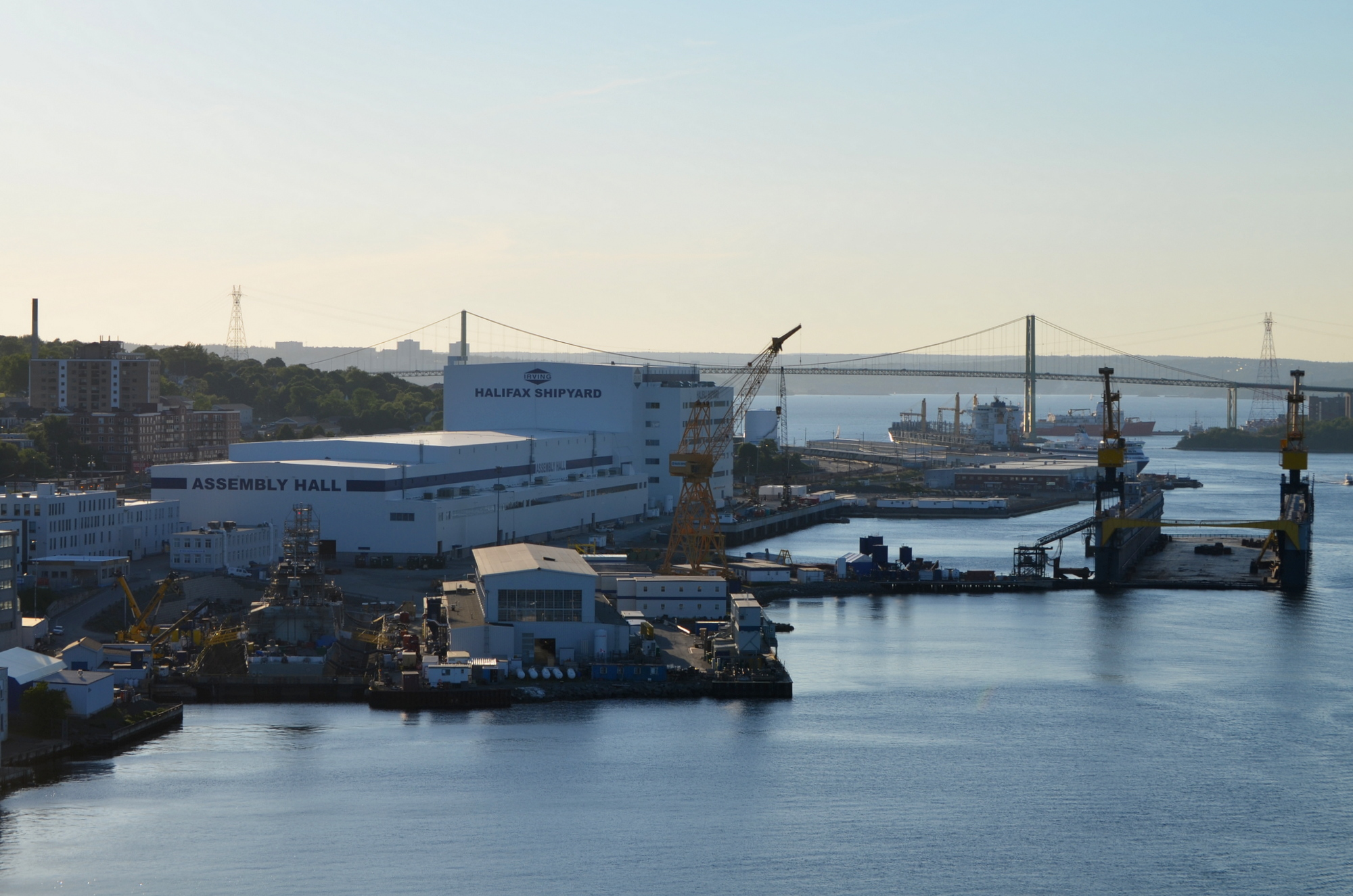
The Halifax Shipyard in 2015. Refits for Halifax-class frigates used by Maritime Forces Atlantic were completed at the shipyard in 2016.

The refit program was formally announced as completed on the west coast by Victoria Shipyards on 29 April 2016 by the Minister of National Defence Harjit Sajjan when Regina was returned to the Royal Canadian Navy. Calgary was the first to undergo work at Victoria, followed by Winnipeg, Vancouver, Ottawa and Regina. The construction phase of the program on the east coast was completed on 29 November 2016 when the final east coast ship, Toronto, was handed back to the Royal Canadian Navy at Halifax Shipyard.

=== Control systems ===
The new combat system architecture and combat management system fitted to the Halifax class is the CMS330 Combat Management System from Lockheed Martin Canada, which includes elements of the Saab 9LV Mk4 combat management system (known as the "CanACCS-9LV" suite of components.) CMS330 is a development of SHINPADS. The Integrated Platform Management System (IPMS) from L-3 MAPPS provides systems management. IPMS is a development of SHINMACS.

=== Weaponry and propulsion upgrades ===
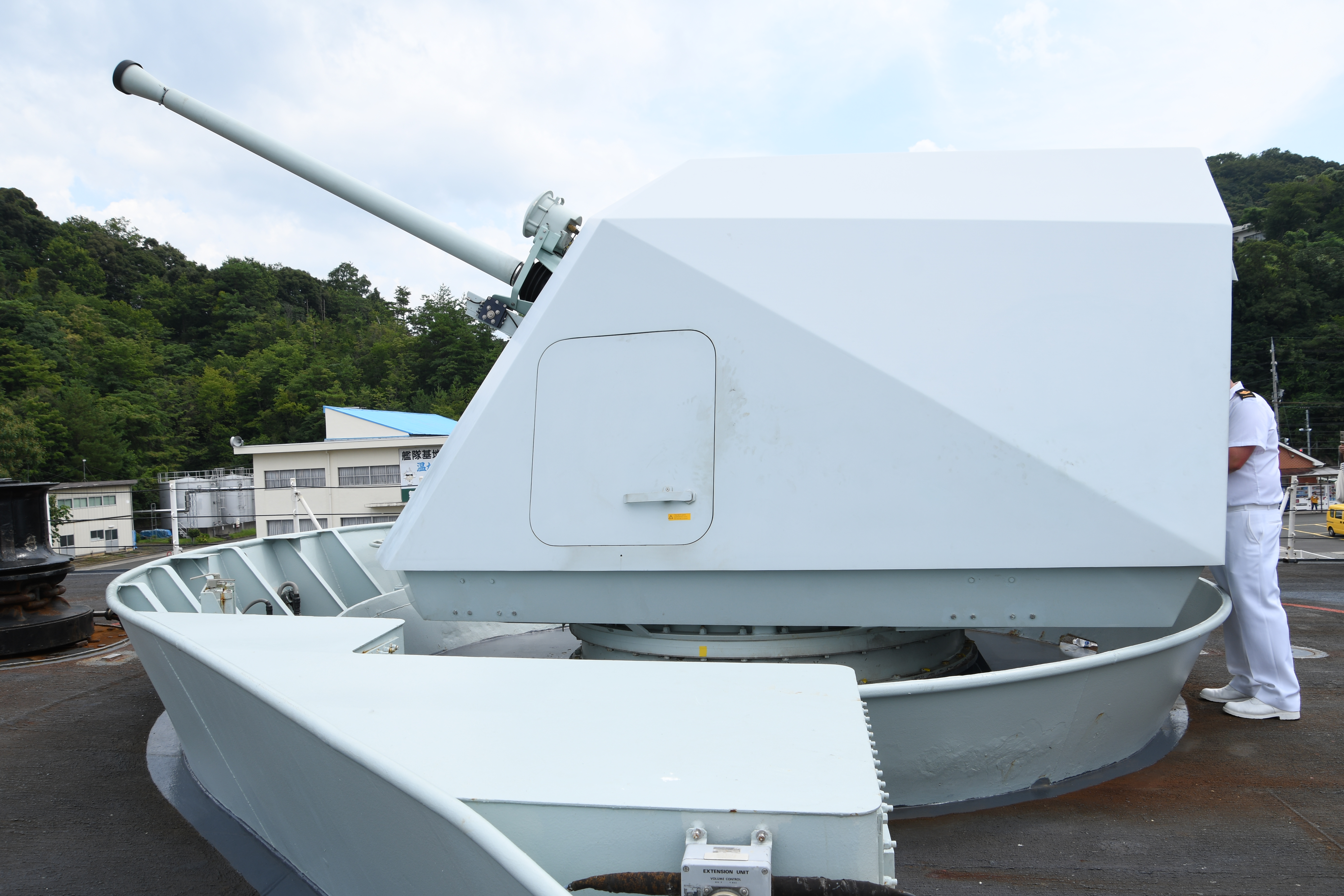
A Bofors 57 mm Mark 3 mounted on HMCS Ottawa

The Halifax class use the RIM-162 Evolved Sea Sparrow Missile (ESSM), instead of the obsolete RIM-7 Sea Sparrow. The ESSM gives a greater range against anti-ship missiles and enemy aircraft. The Royal Canadian Navy announced the upgrade of the ESSMs in March 2023 to the Block II configuration, achieving operational capability in June 2024. The Harpoon missiles were upgraded to Block II, with first test firing aboard the frigates performed in 2016. BAE Systems received a contract to upgrade the Bofors 57 mm Mk 2 to Bofors 57 mm Mk 3 configuration in 2009.

The Department of National Defence requested a tender to provide a naval remote weapon system (NRWS) defence capability to the Halifax and Iroquois classes. The Halifax class was to be fitted with this new system to replace the 12.7 mm M2HB heavy machine gun. Although not part of the refit, Raytheon Canada Limited was awarded a contract of $180 million for eight years to overhaul, convert and repair all Canadian CIWS to a Block 1B Baseline 1 configuration.

It was announced by the Department of National Defence that Hewitt Equipment was chosen to replace the diesel generators aboard the Halifax-class vessels in June 2015. The contract was awarded for 10 years, with options to extend it out to 22 years and covers ships assigned to either coast. The speed of the vessels in the class increased to over 30 knots (56 km/h; 35 mph) following the FELEX upgrades.

=== Sensors and countermeasures ===
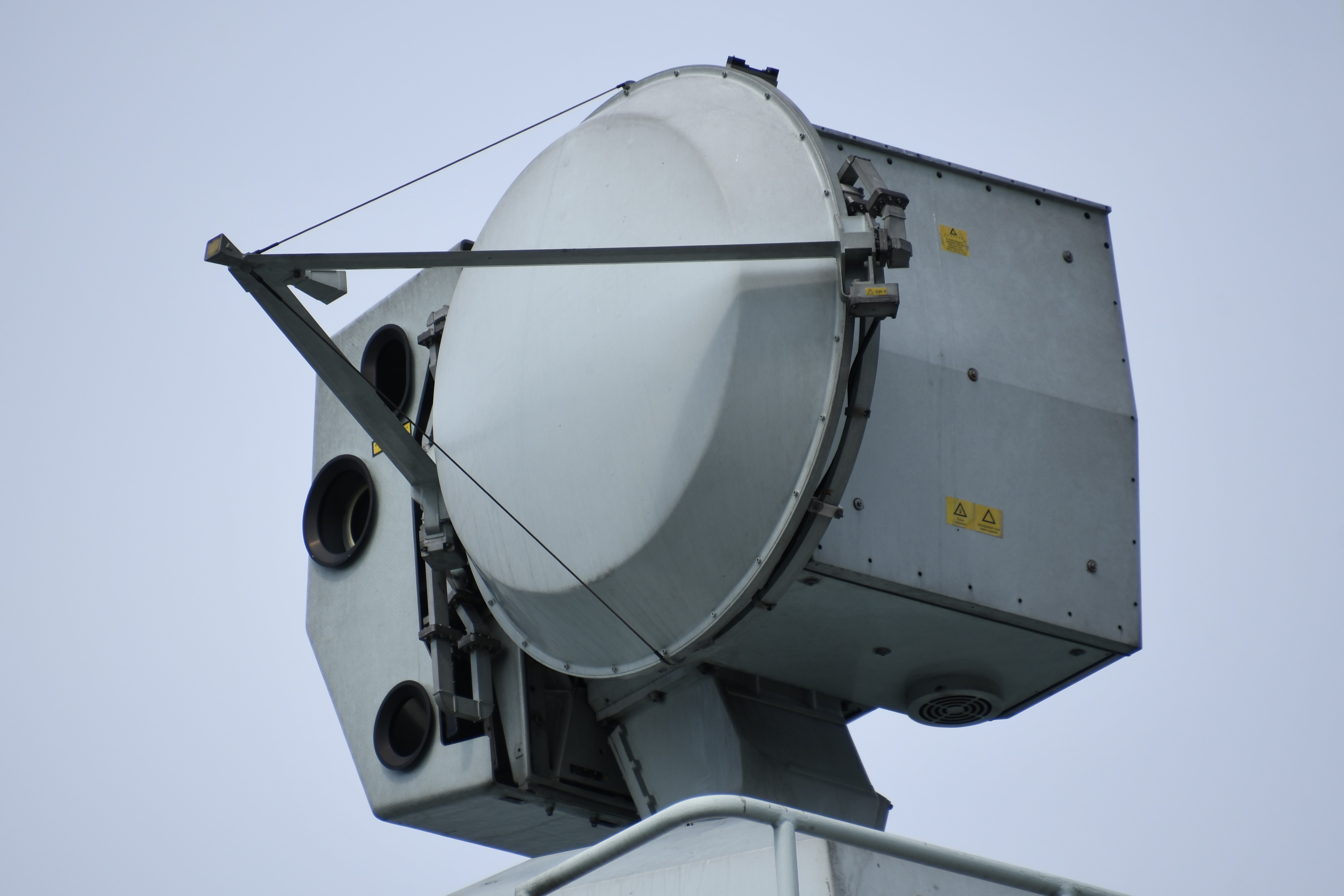
A CEROS 200 Fire Control Radar aboard HMCS Ottawa

As part of the refit, Thales Canada supplied the Sirius long-range Infrared Search and Track (IRST) for the Halifax class. The IRST is currently in use on board the German Sachsen-class frigates. The IRST is able to track low radar cross-section aircraft and ships.

Saab provided 26 CEROS 200 fire control directors. The CEROS 200 is a radar and optronic tracking system which interfaces with advanced anti-ship missiles and gun systems. It provides defence against modern threats including modern sea skimming anti-ship missiles or asymmetric threats in littoral environments. The CEROS 200 is part of the 9LV Mk4.

The Halifax class were fitted with a modified Sea Giraffe SG-150 multi-function search radar. The SG-150 HC will be upgraded and will secure a high level of operational availability as well as improved functions. Furthermore, they were given Sea Giraffe AMB 3D air and surface search radar operating on the C band. Thales supplied 13 Smart-S Mk2 S-band radars, including one for training purposes. These radars are optimized for medium-to-long-range search and target designation with a high degree of detection. The Smart-S Mk2 is a 3D multibeam radar which can detect hostile targets in near-shore environments. The deliveries began at the end of 2010 and were completed in 2015.

Raytheon Anschütz provided at least 12 Pathfinder ST MK 2 Radar systems. The Pathfinder Mark II is designed to provide a modern and flexible navigation tool. The Pathfinder ST Mk 2 radar system is part of the 9LV Mk4. In 2015, Canada acquired twelve sets of X and S-Band navigation radars from Raytheon Anschütz for the class. The new radars have advanced detection capability, new radiation control and pulse blanker interfaces and have improved interaction with the vessels' upgraded command and control system.

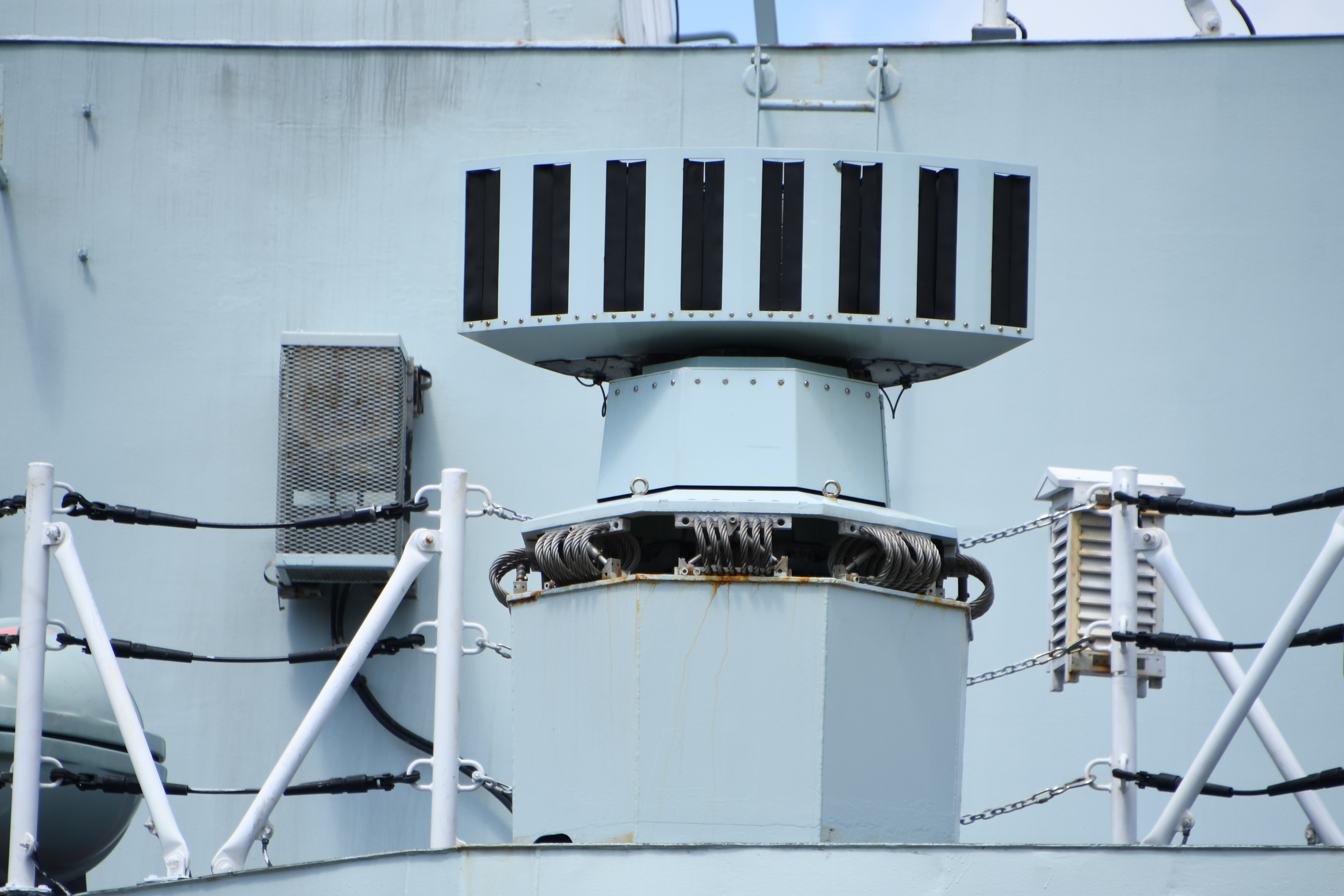
The Halifax class is fitted with the Multi Ammunition Softkill System

The Halifax class were fitted with the Multi Ammunition Softkill System (MASS) developed by Rheinmetall. MASS is a fully computerized countermeasure. The system is connected to the ship's sensors and protects ships from attacks by advanced, sensor-guided missiles by launching decoys that operate in all relevant wavelengths. Elbit Systems received a contract to supply electronic warfare equipment for the Halifax class, including active jamming and tracking systems.

Rheinmetall Waffe Munition GmbH received a contract to provide 14 passive electronic countermeasures (ECM) systems.

Separate from the HCMP, the Halifax class received upgraded General Dynamics Mission Systems - Canada AN/SQS-510 hull-mounted sonar as part of the Underwater Warfare Suite Upgrade (UWSU). Some internal components of AN/SQS-510 such as the sonar amplifier and broadband transducers were replaced to enhance the sonar's performance. Nautel, a subcontractor for GDMS-Canada, was awarded with contract on the 2nd of October 2018 to supply the NS72-36 sonar amplifier and Nautel Mk II broadband transducers. Ville de Québec was the first ship to received the full UWSU sonar upgrade. This upgrade is still in implementation phase and the rest of the class will receive the upgrade while undergoing refits. The class also received new towed array sonar supplied by Ultra Maritime (formerly Ultra Electronics Maritime Systems). The Towed Low Frequency Active Passive Sonar (TLFAS) uses Horizontal Projector Array (HPA) technology, this system combines both the active transmitter and passive receiver in a single towed array, simplifying the use of towed array sonar.

=== Communications ===
The Halifax class received two Navy Multi-band Terminals (NMT), installed on the forward port and starboard sides of the hangar, to increase its satellite communications capabilities. The NMT system communicates with satellites in geostationary orbit via the Ka band. This system was augmented by the Maritime Satellite Communications Upgrade (MSCU), featuring the AN/USC-69(V3) antenna installed on the hangar top. The system was first used by the Halifax class on deployments to Operation Reassurance in 2012.

== Ships in class ==
Construction data
| Name | Pennant number | Builder | Laid down | Launched | Commissioned | Homeport | Status |
|---|---|---|---|---|---|---|---|
| Halifax | FFH 330 | Saint John Shipbuilding, Saint John, New Brunswick | 19 March 1987 | 30 April 1988 | 29 June 1992 | CFB Halifax | Active in service |
| Vancouver | FFH 331 | Saint John Shipbuilding, Saint John, New Brunswick | 19 May 1988 | 8 July 1989 | 23 August 1993 | CFB Esquimalt | Active in service |
| Ville de Québec | FFH 332 | MIL Davie Shipbuilding, Lauzon, Quebec | 16 December 1988 | 16 May 1991 | 14 July 1994 | CFB Halifax | Active in service |
| Toronto | FFH 333 | Saint John Shipbuilding, Saint John, New Brunswick | 22 April 1989 | 18 December 1990 | 29 July 1993 | CFB Halifax | Active in service |
| Regina | FFH 334 | MIL Davie Shipbuilding, Lauzon, Quebec | 6 October 1989 | 25 January 1992 | 30 September 1994 | CFB Esquimalt | Active in service |
| Calgary | FFH 335 | MIL Davie Shipbuilding, Lauzon, Quebec | 15 June 1991 | 28 August 1992 | 12 May 1995 | CFB Esquimalt | Active in service |
| Montréal | FFH 336 | Saint John Shipbuilding, Saint John, New Brunswick | 8 February 1991 | 28 February 1992 | 21 July 1994 | CFB Halifax | Active in service |
| Fredericton | FFH 337 | Saint John Shipbuilding, Saint John, New Brunswick | 25 April 1992 | 26 June 1993 | 10 September 1994 | CFB Halifax | Active in service |
| Winnipeg | FFH 338 | Saint John Shipbuilding, Saint John, New Brunswick | 20 March 1993 | 25 June 1994 | 23 June 1996 | CFB Esquimalt | Active in service |
| Charlottetown | FFH 339 | Saint John Shipbuilding, Saint John, New Brunswick | 18 December 1993 | 1 October 1994 | 9 September 1995 | CFB Halifax | Active in service |
| St. John's | FFH 340 | Saint John Shipbuilding, Saint John, New Brunswick | 24 August 1994 | 26 August 1995 | 26 June 1996 | CFB Halifax | Active in service |
| Ottawa | FFH 341 | Saint John Shipbuilding, Saint John, New Brunswick | 29 April 1995 | 31 May 1996 | 28 September 1996 | CFB Esquimalt | Active in service |

== See also ==
- List of frigate classes in service

Equivalent frigates of the same era

- Karel Doorman class
- Brandenburg class
- Anzac class
- Type 23
- Vasco da Gama class
- Neustrashimy class
- G class
- Kang Ding class

== Sources ==
- Gardiner, Robert; Chumbley, Stephen; Budzbon, Przemysław, eds. (1995). Conway's All the World's Fighting Ships 1947–1995. Annapolis, Maryland: Naval Institute Press. ISBN 978-1-55750-132-5.
- Macpherson, Ken; Barrie, Ron (2002). The Ships of Canada's Naval Forces 1910–2002 (Third ed.). St. Catharines, Ontario: Vanwell Publishing. ISBN 978-1-55125-072-4.
- Milner, Marc (2010). Canada's Navy: The First Century (Second ed.). Toronto: University of Toronto Press. ISBN 978-0-8020-9604-3.
- Saunders, Stephen, ed. (2004). Jane's Fighting Ships 2004–05. Alexandria, Virginia: Jane's Information Group Inc. ISBN 978-0-7106-2623-3.
