= Canada in World War I =

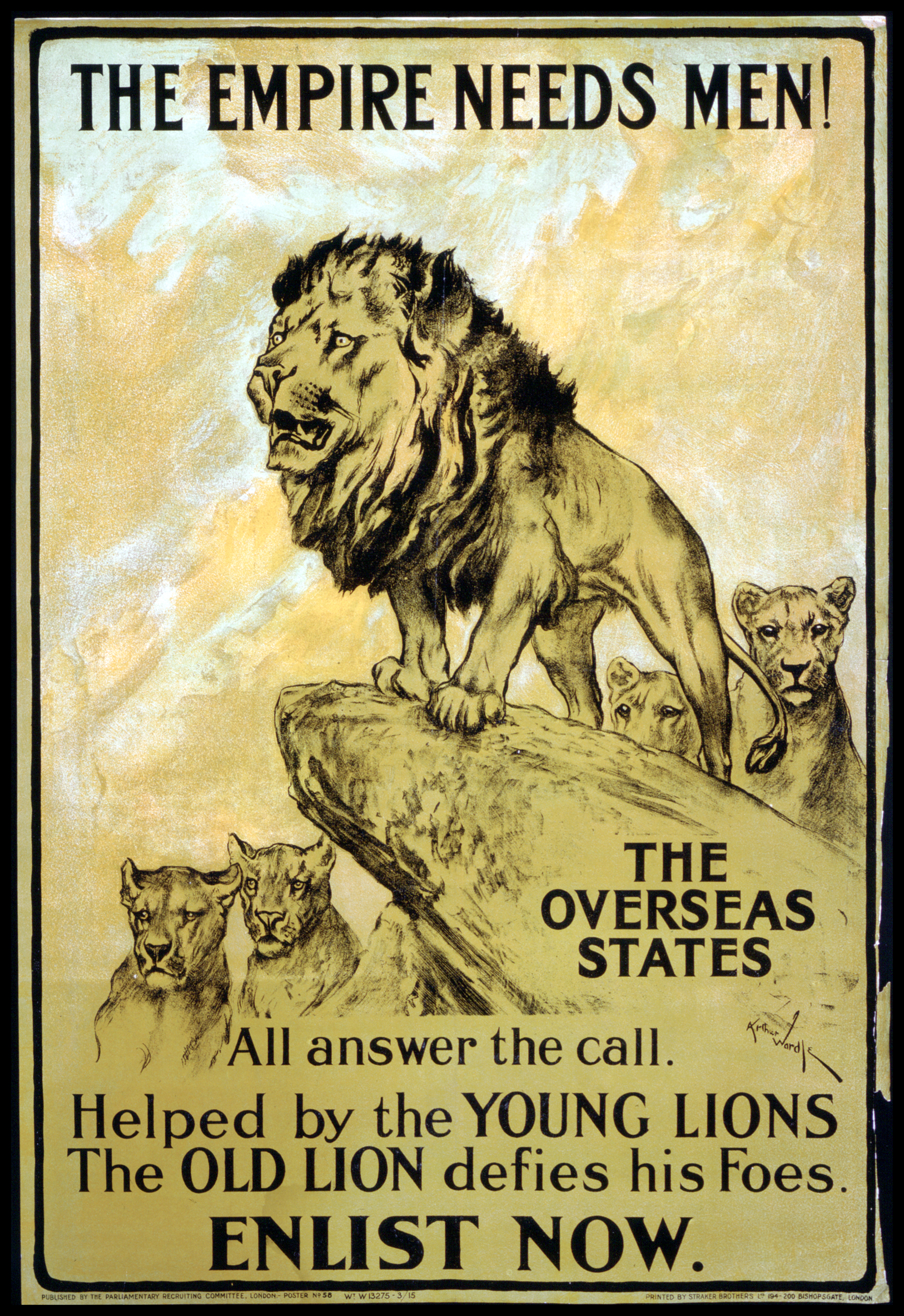
A recruitment poster used in Canada during World War I

The history of Canada in World War I began on August 4, 1914, when the United Kingdom entered the First World War (1914–1918) by declaring war on Germany. The British declaration of war automatically brought Canada into the war, because of Canada's legal status as a British Dominion which left foreign policy decisions in the hands of the British parliament. However, the Canadian government had the freedom to determine the country's level of involvement in the war. On August 4, 1914, the Governor General declared a war between Canada and Germany. The Militia was not mobilized and instead an independent Canadian Expeditionary Force was raised.

Canada's sacrifices and contributions to the Great War changed its history and enabled it to become more independent, while also opening a deep rift between the French and English speaking populations. For the first time in Canadian military history, Canadian forces fought as a distinct unit, first under a British commander but ultimately under a Canadian-born commander. The highpoints of Canadian military achievement during the Great War came during the Somme, Vimy, and Passchendaele battles and what later became known as "Canada's Hundred Days". Canada's total casualties stood at the end of the war at 67,000 killed and 173,000 wounded, out of an expeditionary force of 620,000 people mobilized (39 per cent of mobilized were casualties).Many survivors became disabled and experienced important challenges later on. While they were partially admired, they also suffered from discrimination due to their disabilities and faced reduced job opportunities, especially those who had relied on physical labour in the past

Canadians of British descent—the majority—gave widespread support arguing that Canadians had a duty to fight on behalf of their Motherland. Indeed, Sir Wilfrid Laurier, although French-Canadian, spoke for the majority of English-Canadians when he proclaimed: "It is our duty to let Great Britain know and to let the friends and foes of Great Britain know that there is in Canada but one mind and one heart and that all Canadians are behind the Mother Country." However this did not stop Laurier along with Henri Bourassa from leading the opposition to conscription three years later in 1917. Canadian Prime Minister Robert Borden offered assistance to Great Britain, which was quickly accepted.

== Beginning ==
=== Preparations ===
Prior to the war, military land forces were organized as the Canadian Militia, with the regular Permanent Active Militia, and the sedentary Non-Permanent Active Militia. The Minister of Militia and Defence, Sam Hughes, was ordered by Prime Minister Sir Robert Borden to train and recruit an army for overseas service. At the time, Canada had a regular army of only 3,110 men and a fledgling navy.

Although the Chief of the General Staff, Willoughby Gwatkin, had been planning for a mass mobilization of Canadian Militia for some time, the mobilization plans were scrapped in favour of mobilizing a completely new land force, the Canadian Expeditionary Force, to be based on numbered battalions and reporting to a separate ministry, the Ministry of Overseas Forces of Canada. Although the force was raised quickly, it was riven with political patronage and lacked a solid core of professional officers and NCOs.

=== Participation ===
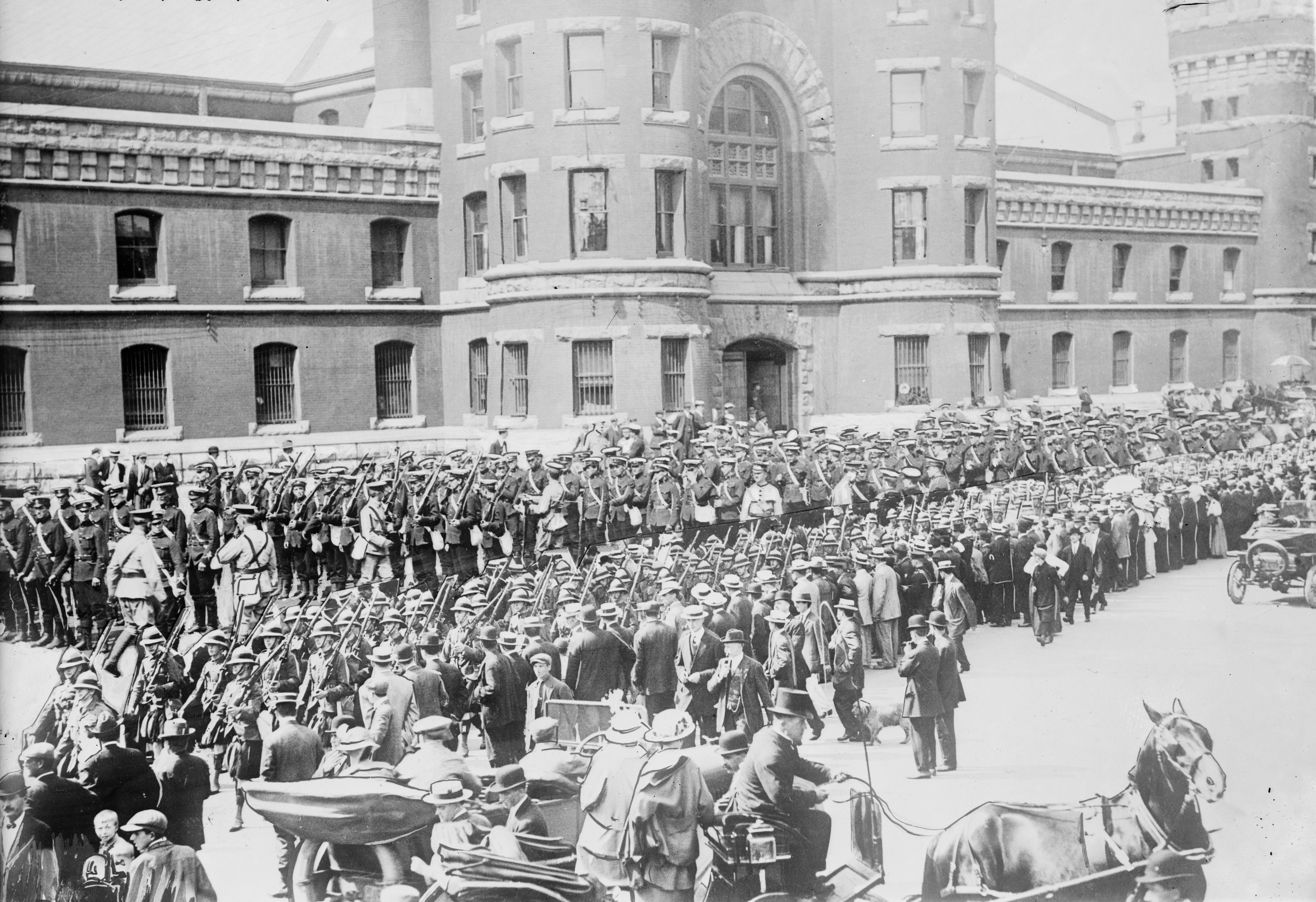
Members of the 48th Regiment "Highlanders" depart for camp from a Toronto armoury, 1914.

Around 600,000 men and women participated in the war by enlisting as nurses, soldiers and chaplains. In general, non-white people and those born in enemy nations were not welcomed into the military. When Black people from Sydney, Nova Scotia volunteered their services, they were told, "This is not for you fellows, this is a white man's war." Although prejudiced attitudes prevented many non-white people from initially enlisting, some did manage to join CEF units in the beginning of the war.

Nonetheless, some segregated units were formed. In 1915, Indigenous people were allowed to enlist and accepted into a 114th Battalion as well as others. Approximately 3,500 Indigenous people served, although estimates vary due to incomplete records and differing definitions of Indigenous identity.

The No. 2 Construction Battalion was formed in 1916, after leading Black figures from communities in Nova Scotia and Ontario engaged in a letter-writing campaign to request for an all-Black battalion to Sam Hughes, and the British War Office approved segregated units. The unit was the first and only all-Black unit in Canadian military history, and included black soldiers from both Canada and the United States, the latter having crossed into Canada in order to participate. Black Canadians who were in the No. 2 Construction Battalion remained segregated during their tour.

The Canadian Japanese Association in British Columbia put forward a volunteer reserve force of 227 men, some of whom were later admitted into the military. There is a monument to them in British Columbia.

A deal between the Chinese government and the allies resulted in the enlistment of thousands of Chinese who formed the Chinese Labour Corps (CLC) mainly poor Chinese men from the North who were told they would be in non-combatant roles. The Canadian government had restricted the arrival of all Asians and the CLC were secretly landed in Victoria, British Columbia. They were drilled in the old quarantine station at William Head and secretly shipped across Canada in cattle-trucks.

== Field formations ==
=== Canadian Corps ===
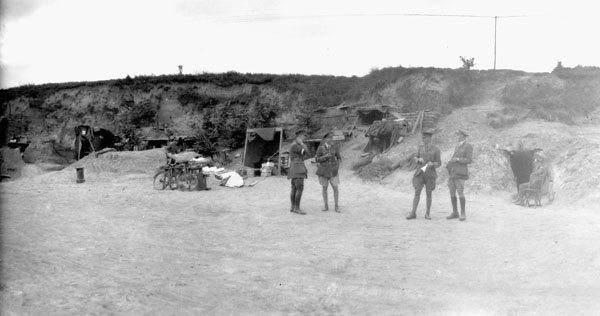
The Canadian Corps field headquarters in Neuville-Vitasse, 1918.

The Canadian Corps was formed as a field formation of the Canadian Expeditionary Force in September 1915 after the arrival of the 2nd Canadian Division in France. The soldiers of the corps were mostly volunteers, as conscription was not implemented until the end of the war (see Conscription Crisis of 1917). The corps was expanded by the addition of the 3rd Canadian Division in December 1915 and the 4th Canadian Division in August 1916. The organization of a 5th Canadian Division began in February 1917, but it was still not fully formed when it was broken up in February 1918 and its men used to reinforce the other four divisions. Although the corps was within and under the command of the British Army, there was considerable pressure among Canadian leaders, especially following the Battle of the Somme, for the corps to fight as a single unit rather than spreading the divisions through the whole army, which contributed to the development of a distinct Canadian military identity and improved battlefield coordination.

Originally commanded by Lieutenant General Sir Edwin Alderson until 1916, command was then passed to Lieutenant General Sir Julian Byng, later, Lord Byng of Vimy and Governor General of Canada. When Byng was promoted to a higher command in the summer of 1917, he was succeeded by the commander of the 1st Division, General Sir Arthur Currie, giving the corps its first Canadian commanders. In the later stages of the war, the Canadian Corps was among the most effective and respected of the military formations on the Western Front.

=== Canadian Cavalry Brigade ===
The Canadian Cavalry Brigade arrived in France in 1915. Initially having three Canadian regiments and one British, in January 1916, it became an all-Canadian formation. The brigade was deployed separately from the Canadian Corps and was under the command of various British cavalry divisions. The brigade engaged in several battles, notably the Battle of Moreuil Wood 30 April 1918.

== Western Front ==
=== 1915 ===
==== Neuve Chapelle ====
The Canadian Expeditionary Force saw their first battle in March 1915 in the French town of Neuve Chapelle. After arriving from Salisbury Plain in England, the Canadian forces were instructed to prevent the Germans from reinforcing the sector of Neuve Chapelle. This would allow the British 1st Army, under General Douglas Haig, to successfully push through German lines and establish a new Allied front line on conquered territory.

Although the British were unable to exploit their advantage due to poor communication, it taught Canadians that artillery bombardment was too light to suppress the enemy trenches; that better artillery observation points were necessary; that reserves were too few to follow up success quickly; and most importantly, that the procedure of transmitting information and sending orders to the advanced troops was slow and difficult, and that the systems of communication were much too vulnerable.

==== Second Battle of Ypres ====
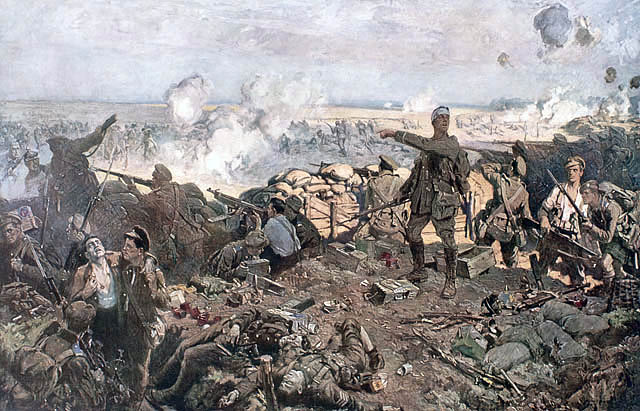
Second Battle of Ypres by Richard Jack. The painting was the first commission completed for the Canadian Wars Memorials Fund.

In the first week of April 1915 the soldiers of the 1st Canadian Division were moved to reinforce the salient where the British and Allied line pushed into the German line in a concave bend. On 22 April, the Germans sought to eliminate this salient by using poison gas. Following an intensive artillery bombardment, they released 160 tons of chlorine gas from cylinders dug into the forward edge of their trenches into a light northeast wind—the first use of chlorine gas in the war. As thick clouds of yellow-green chlorine drifted over their trenches the French colonial defences crumbled and the troops, completely overcome by this terrible weapon, died or broke and fled, leaving a gaping four-mile hole in the Allied line. The Canadians were the only division that were able to hold the line.

All through the night, the Canadians fought to close this gap. On 24 April, the Germans launched another poison gas attack, this time at the Canadian line. In those 48 hours of battle, the Canadians suffered over 6,000 casualties, one man in every three, of whom more than 2,000 died.

=== 1916 ===
==== Battle of the Somme ====
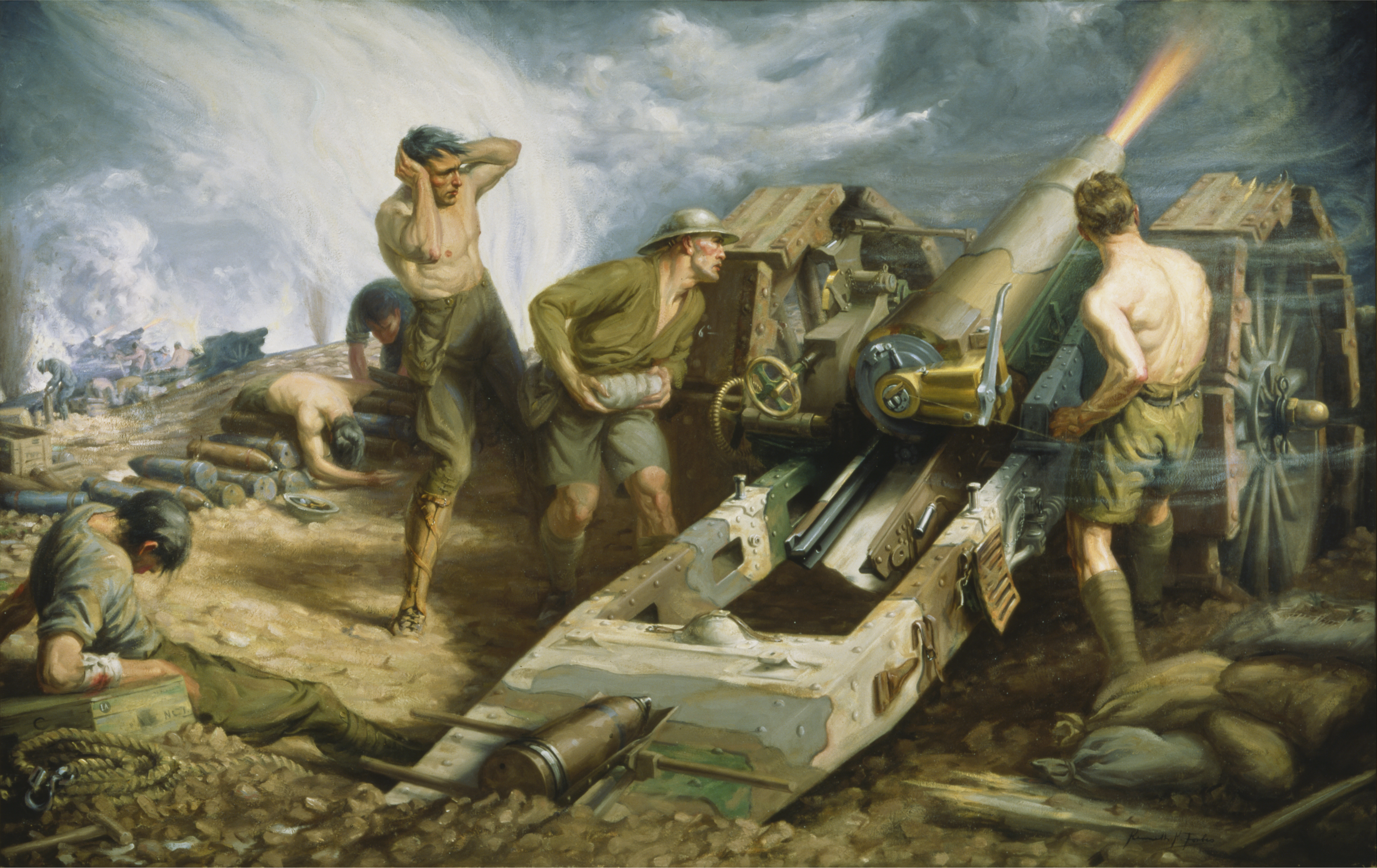
Canadian Artillery in Action by Kenneth Forbes. It depicts gunners at their post while sustaining artillery fire during the Battle of the Somme.

The next area where Canadians fought was at the Battle of the Somme from the latter half of 1916. Initially launched as a campaign to relieve pressure from the beleaguered French forces at the Battle of Verdun, the Allied casualties actually exceeded those at Verdun.

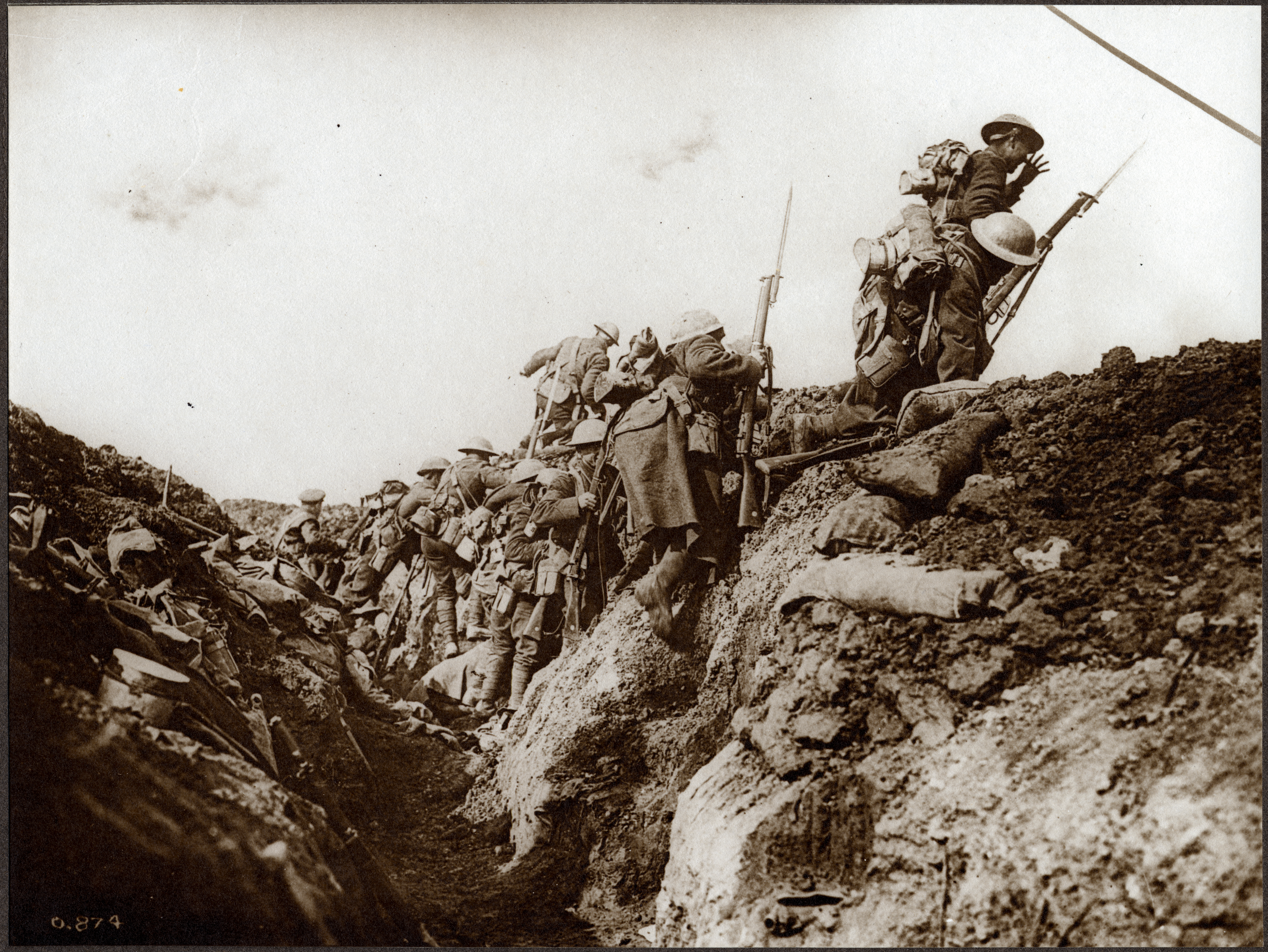
A battalion conducts a bayonet charge during the Battle of the Somme.

The battle began on 1 July 1916, and among the first troops to leave their trenches were the men of the Royal Newfoundland Regiment. Newfoundland at the time was not a part of the Canadian confederation but was considered a separate dominion; as a result, the Newfoundlanders advanced as part of the 29th Division, not the Canadian Corps. The attack went very poorly for the Newfoundlanders, resulting in massive casualties – of the 801 men that made up the regiment just the day before, only 68 reported for roll call on 2 July, and every officer that had gone over the top had been killed.

The Canadian Corps entered the battle in September when it was tasked to secure the small town of Courcelette, France. In the major offensive which began at dawn on September 15 the Canadian Corps, on the extreme left of the attack, assaulted on a 2,200-yard sector west of the village of Courcelette. By November 11, the 4th Canadian Division finally secured most of the German trenches in Courcelette and then rejoined the Canadian Corps at Vimy Ridge.

The Battle of the Somme claimed more than 24,000 Canadian casualties. But it also gave Canadian units the reputation of a formidable assault force. As British Prime Minister Lloyd George wrote, "The Canadians played a part of such distinction that thenceforward they were marked out as shock troops; for the remainder of the war they were brought along to head the assault in one great battle after another. Whenever the Germans found the Canadian Corps coming into the line they prepared for the worst."

=== 1917 ===
==== Battle of Vimy Ridge ====
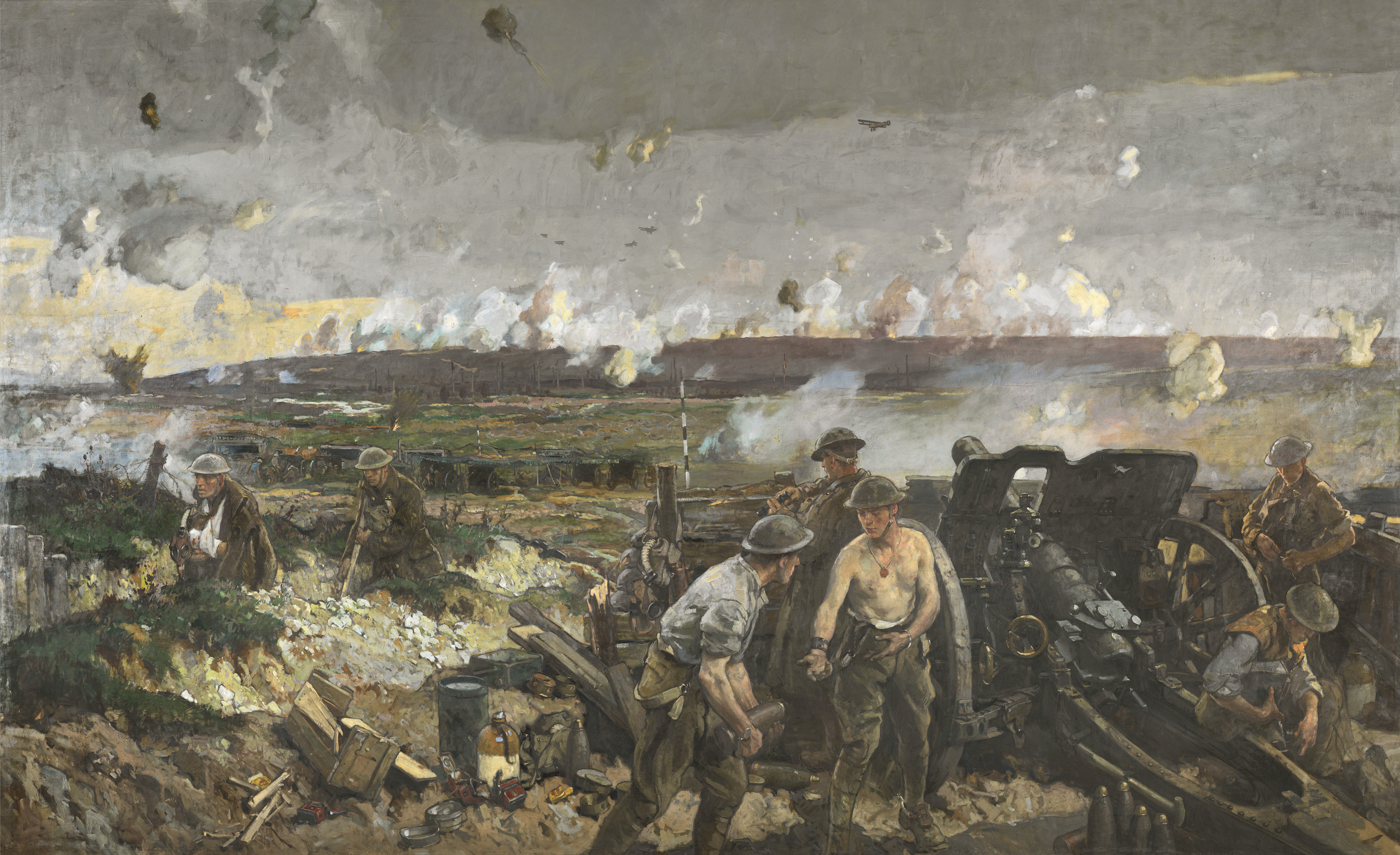
The Taking of Vimy Ridge, Easter Monday 1917 by Richard Jack. The battle began with an artillery barrage.

For the first time, all four Canadian divisions were to be assembled to operate in combat as a corps. The Canadian divisions were joined by the British 5th Infantry Division, and reinforced by artillery, engineer and labour units. The Canadian Corps was supported to the north by the 24th British Division of I Corps which advanced north of the Souchez river and by the advancing XVII Corps to the south. The attack began at 5:43 a.m. on Easter Monday, 9 April 1917 whereupon every artillery piece at the disposal of the Canadian Corps began firing. Light field guns laid down a barrage which advanced in predetermined increments, often 100 yards (91 m) every three minutes, while medium and heavy howitzers established a series of standing barrages further ahead, against known defensive systems.

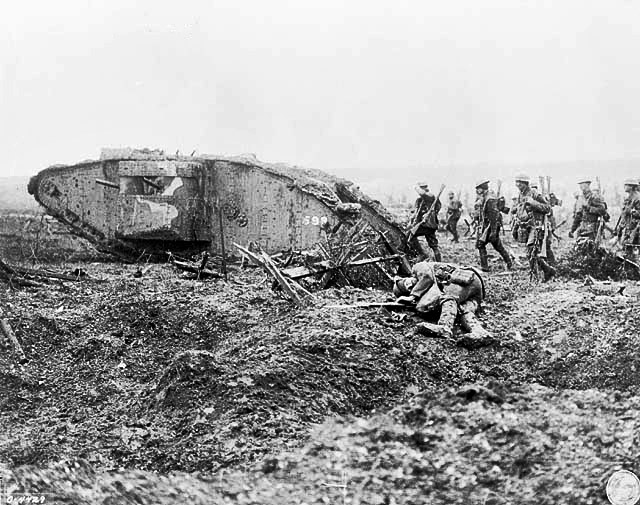
Canadian soldiers advance behind a Mark II heavy tank during the battle.

The 1st, 2nd and 3rd Canadian Divisions reported reaching and capturing their first objective, the Black Line, by 6:25 a.m. The 4th Canadian Division encountered a great deal of trouble in its advance and was unable to complete its first objective until some hours later. After a planned pause, in which positions were consolidated, the advance resumed. Shortly after 7:00 a.m., the 1st Canadian Division had taken half of its second objective, the Red Line, and moved a brigade forward to mount an attack on the remainder. The 2nd Canadian Division reported reaching the Red Line and capturing the town of Les Tilleuls at approximately the same time. Units at the 3rd Canadian Division reached their section of the Red Line at around 7:30 a.m. However, due to an exposed left flank caused by the failure of the 4th Canadian Division to capture the top of the ridge, the 3rd Canadian Division was forced to stop and establish a divisional defensive flank to its north. It was not until 11:00 a.m. that the defending German 79th Reserve Division mounted a counterattack, by which time only the 4th Canadian Division had not reached its objective.

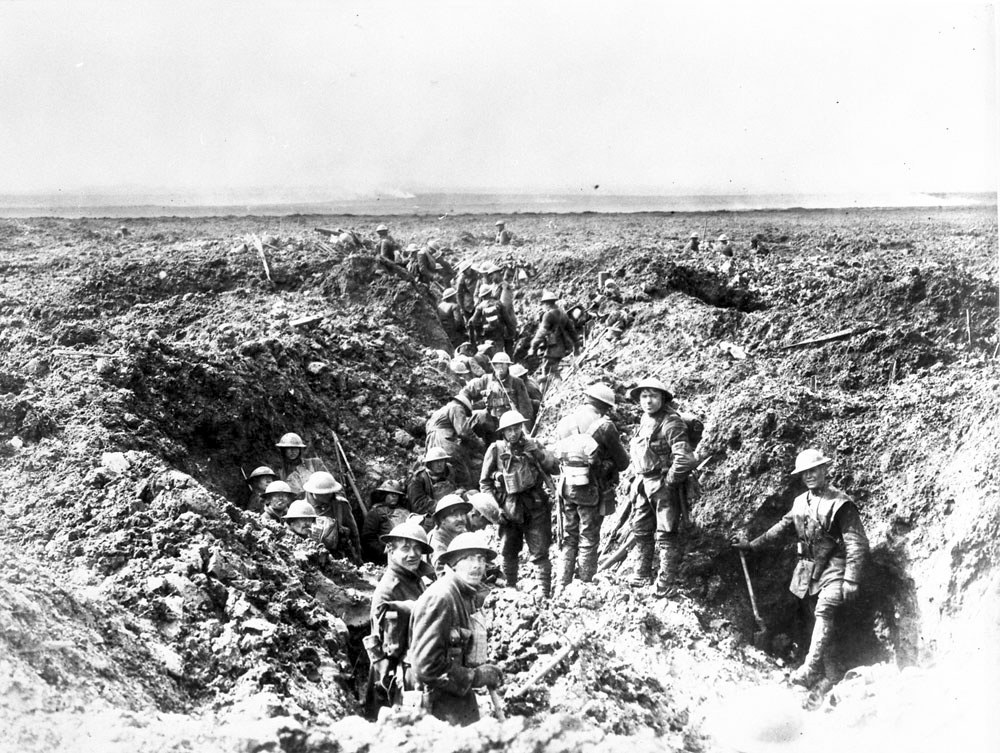
Canadian infantry consolidate their positions at Vimy Ridge.

Three fresh brigades were moved up to the Red Line by 9:30 a.m., 10 April to support the advance whereupon they leapfrogged existing units occupying the Red line and advanced to the Blue Line. By approximately 11:00 a.m., the Blue Line, including Hill 135 and the town of Thélus, had been captured. The advance briefly halted, the artillery barrage remaining stationary for 90 minutes to give troops time to consolidate the Blue Line and bring supporting machine guns forward. Shortly before 1 p.m., the advance recommenced with the Brown Line being secure around 2:00 p.m. By this point only the northern half of Hill 145 and "the Pimple", a fortified highpoint outside of Givenchy-en-Gohelle, remained under German control. Fresh troops finally forced the remaining German troops from the northern half of Hill 145 at around 3:15 p.m. and by nightfall of 10 April, the only objective not yet achieved was the capture of "the Pimple". Supported by a significant amount of artillery and the 24th British Division of I Corps to the north, the 10th Canadian Brigade attacked the hastily entrenched German troops and captured "the Pimple" on 12 April, bringing an end to the battle. By nightfall on 12 April 1917 the Canadian Corps was in firm control of the ridge.

The corps had suffered 10,602 casualties; 3,598 killed and 7,004 wounded. The German Sixth Army suffered an unknown number of casualties with an approximate 4,000 men becoming prisoners of war. Four Victoria Crosses, the highest military decoration awarded to British and Commonwealth forces for valour, were awarded. The Germans did not attempt to recapture the ridge, even in the Spring Offensive, and it remained under British control until the end of the war. The success of the operation has often been interpreted as a defining moment in the emergence of Canadian national identity during WW1.

==== Battle of Passchendaele ====
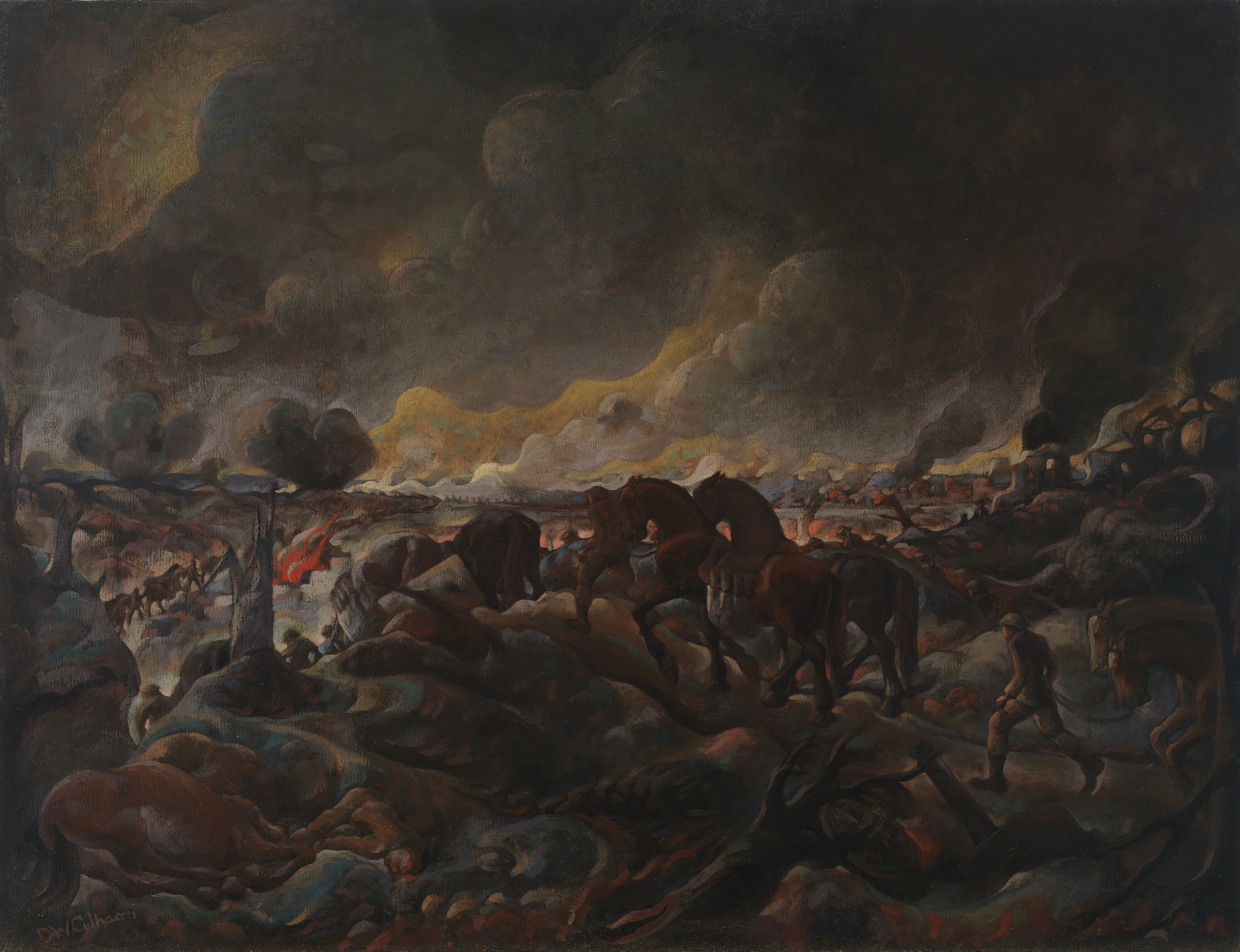
Mud Road to Passchendaele by Douglas Culham. The painting depicts a nighttime supply column traversing the muddy conditions of the Second Battle of Passchendaele.

The four divisions of the Canadian Corps were transferred to the Ypres Salient and tasked with making additional advances on Passchendaele. The Canadian Corps relieved II Anzac Corps on 18 October from their positions along the valley between Gravenstafel Ridge and the heights at Passchendaele. It was virtually the same front as had been occupied by the 1st Canadian Division in April 1915. The Canadian Corps operation was to be executed in series of three attacks each with limited objectives, delivered at intervals of three or more days. As the Canadian Corps position was directly south of the inter-army boundary between British Fifth and Second Army, the British Fifth Army would mount subsidiary operations on the Canadian Corps' left flank while the I Anzac Corps would advance to protect the right flank. The execution dates of the phases were tentatively given as 26 October, 30 October and 6 November.

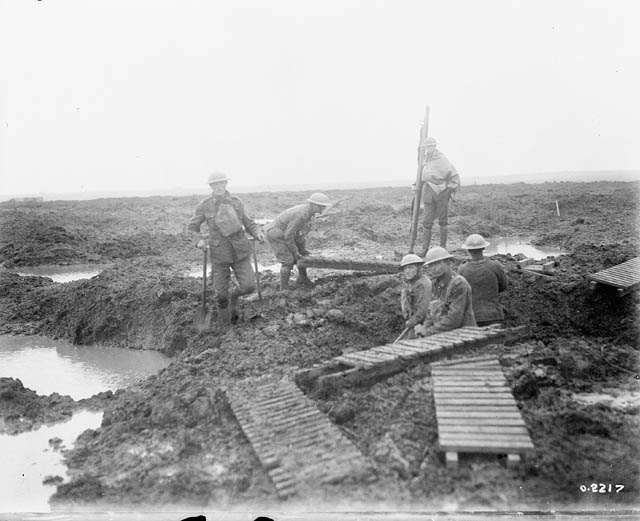
Canadian Pioneers laying trench mats over mud

The first stage began on the morning of 26 October. The 3rd Canadian Division was assigned the northern flank which included the sharply rising ground of the Bellevue spur. South of the Ravebeek creek, the 4th Canadian Division would take the Decline Copse which straddled the Ypres-Roulers railway. The 3rd Canadian Division captured the Wolf Copse and secured its objective line but was ultimately forced to drop a defensive flank to link up with the flanking division of the British Fifth Army. The 4th Canadian Division initially captured all its objectives, but gradually retreated from the Decline Copse due to German counterattacks and mis-communications between the Canadian and Australian units to the south.

The second stage began on 30 October and was intended to capture the positions not captured in the previous stage and gain a base for the final assault on Passchendaele. The southern flank was to capture the strongly held Crest Farm while the northern flank was to capture the hamlet of Meetcheele as well as the Goudberg area near the Canadian Corps' northern boundary. The southern flank quickly captured Crest Farm and begun sending patrols beyond its objective line and into Passchendaele itself. The northern flank was again met with exceptional German resistance. The 3rd Canadian Division captured Vapour Farm at the corps' boundary, Furst Farm to the west of Meetcheele and the crossroads at Meetcheele, but remained short of its objective line.

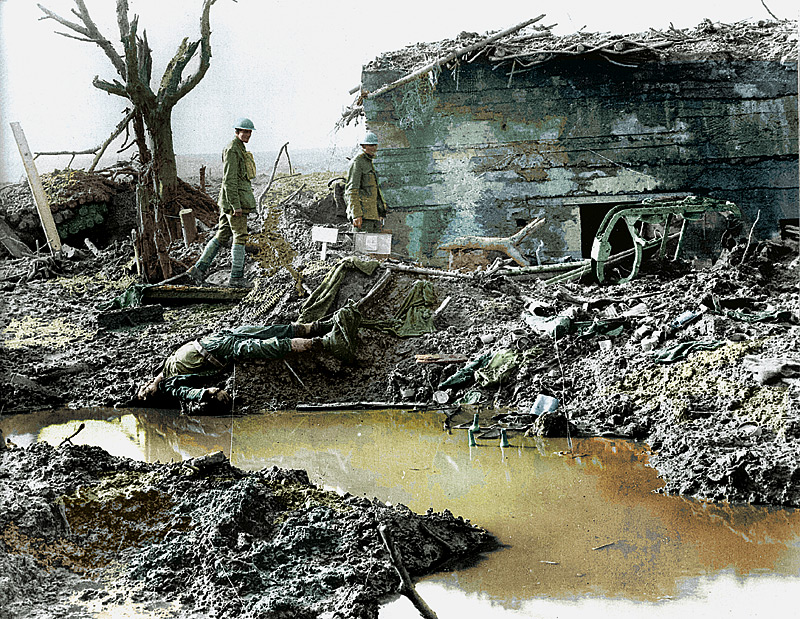
Canadian soldiers survey a destroyed German bunker during the battle of Passchendaele.

To permit time to facilitate inter-divisional reliefs, there was a planned seven-day pause between the second and third stage. British Second Army was ordered to take over section of the British Fifth Army front adjoining the Canadian Corps, so that the central portion of the assault could proceed under a single command. Three consecutive rainless days between 3 and 5 November aided logistical preparations and reorganization of the troops for the next stage. The third stage began the morning of 6 November with the 1st and 2nd Canadian Divisions having taken over the front, relieving the 3rd and 4th Canadian Divisions respectively. Less than three hours after the start of the assault, many units had reached their final objective lines and the town of Passchendaele had been captured.

A final successful action to gain the remaining high ground north of the village in the vicinity of Hill 52 was launched 11 November. This attack on 11 November brought to an end the long drawn-out Third Battle of Ypres. The Second Battle of Passchendaele cost the Canadian Corps 15,654 casualties with over 4 000 dead, in 16 days of fighting.

=== 1918 ===
==== Hundred Days Offensive ====
Throughout these three final months, the Canadian troops saw action in several areas. The first was near the enemy salient on August 8 where the Canadian Corps (along with the New Zealanders, Australians, French and British) was charged with the task of spearheading the assault on the German forces in Amiens. In the subsequent battle, the morale of the German forces was badly shaken. In Ludendorff's words, the battle of Arras was a "black day for the German army." After their breakthrough at Amiens, the Canadians were shifted back to Arras and given the task of cracking the Hindenburg Line in the Arras area.

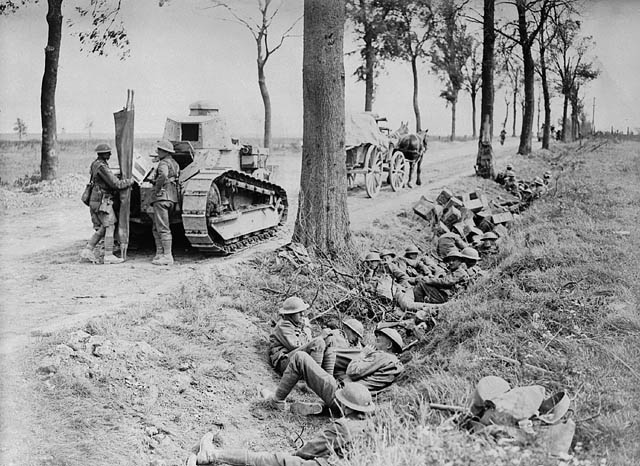
Canadian troops shelter in a ditch during the Battle of Cambrai.

Between August 26 and September 2, the Canadian Corps launched multiple attacks near the German front at Canal du Nord. On September 27, 1918, the Canadian Corps broke through the Hindenburg Line by smashing through a dry section of the Canal du Nord. The operation ended in triumph on October 11, 1918, when the Canadian forces drove the Germans out of their main distribution centre in the Battle of Cambrai. The corps carried on to swift successes at Denain and Valenciennes and on the final day of the war marched successfully to Mons.

Though incredibly successful, this period was also very costly, as the Canadian Corps suffered 46,000 casualties in the final hundred days of the Great War. The last Canadian to be killed was Private George Lawrence Price, two minutes before the armistice took effect at 11 am. on November 11. He is traditionally recognized as being the last British soldier and second last soldier killed in World War I.

==== Homecoming ====
It took months to bring Canada's soldiers home after the end of the war. Anxious to be home, some soldiers rioted in March 1919 to try to rush matters.

=== Casualties ===
During 1914 to 1919, half of the nation's medical resources were devoted to the war effort in the Canadian Army Medical Corps (CAMC). The pre-war army medical corps, founded in 1904, had only 23 officers. It expanded to include 1,525 medical officers, 1,901 nursing sisters, and 15,624 other ranks. CAMC managed 36,000 hospital beds overseas and 12,000 at home. It included nearly half of all active physicians and a majority of leaders of the professions. They were all needed. Of the front-line soldiers over one-third – 154,000 – were wounded and survived, and four out of five survivors returned to duty. However, another 12,000 died of wounds. In all another 39,000 soldiers were killed outright. Venereal disease became a significant issue, with 29% of all Canadian troops infected by 1915.

== Atlantic campaign ==
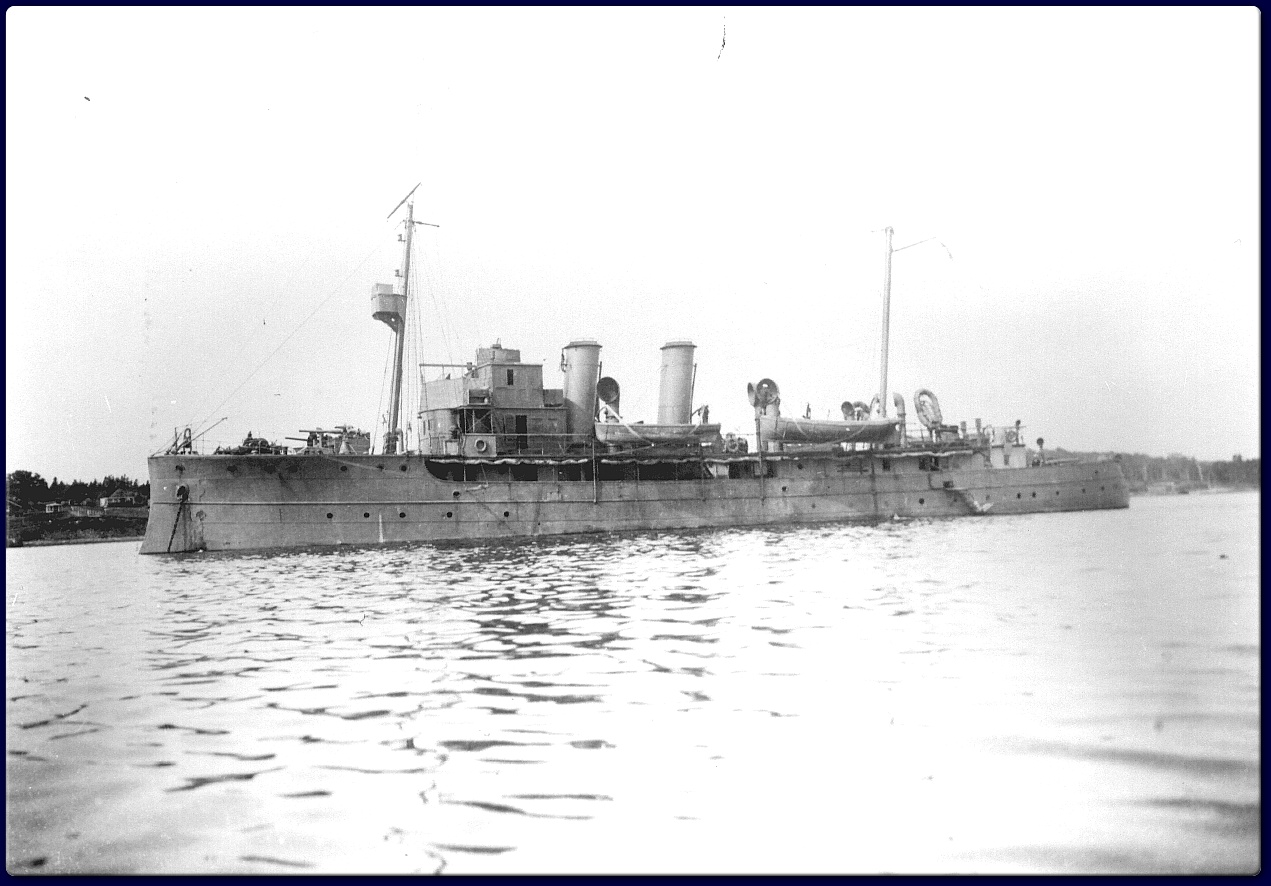
HMCS Margaret, c. 1914–18. The government vessel was pressed into naval service at the outbreak of war.

At the outbreak of the First World War on 5 August 1914, two government vessels, CGS Canada (renamed HMCS Canada) and CGS Margaret, were immediately pressed into naval service, joining HMCS Niobe, HMCS Rainbow and the two submarines HMCS CC-1 and HMCS CC-2, to form the core of the naval force. At this point, the governments of the United Kingdom and Canada were planning to significantly expand the RCN, but it was decided that Canadian men would be permitted to enlist in either the Royal Navy or its Canadian counterpart, with many choosing the former.

During the fall of 1914, HMCS Rainbow patrolled the west coast of North America, as far south as Panama, although these patrols became less important following the elimination of the German naval threat in the Pacific with the December 1914 defeat of Admiral Maximilian von Spee's East Asia Squadron off the Falkland Islands. Many of Rainbow's crew were posted to the east coast for the remainder of the war and by 1917 Rainbow was withdrawn from service.

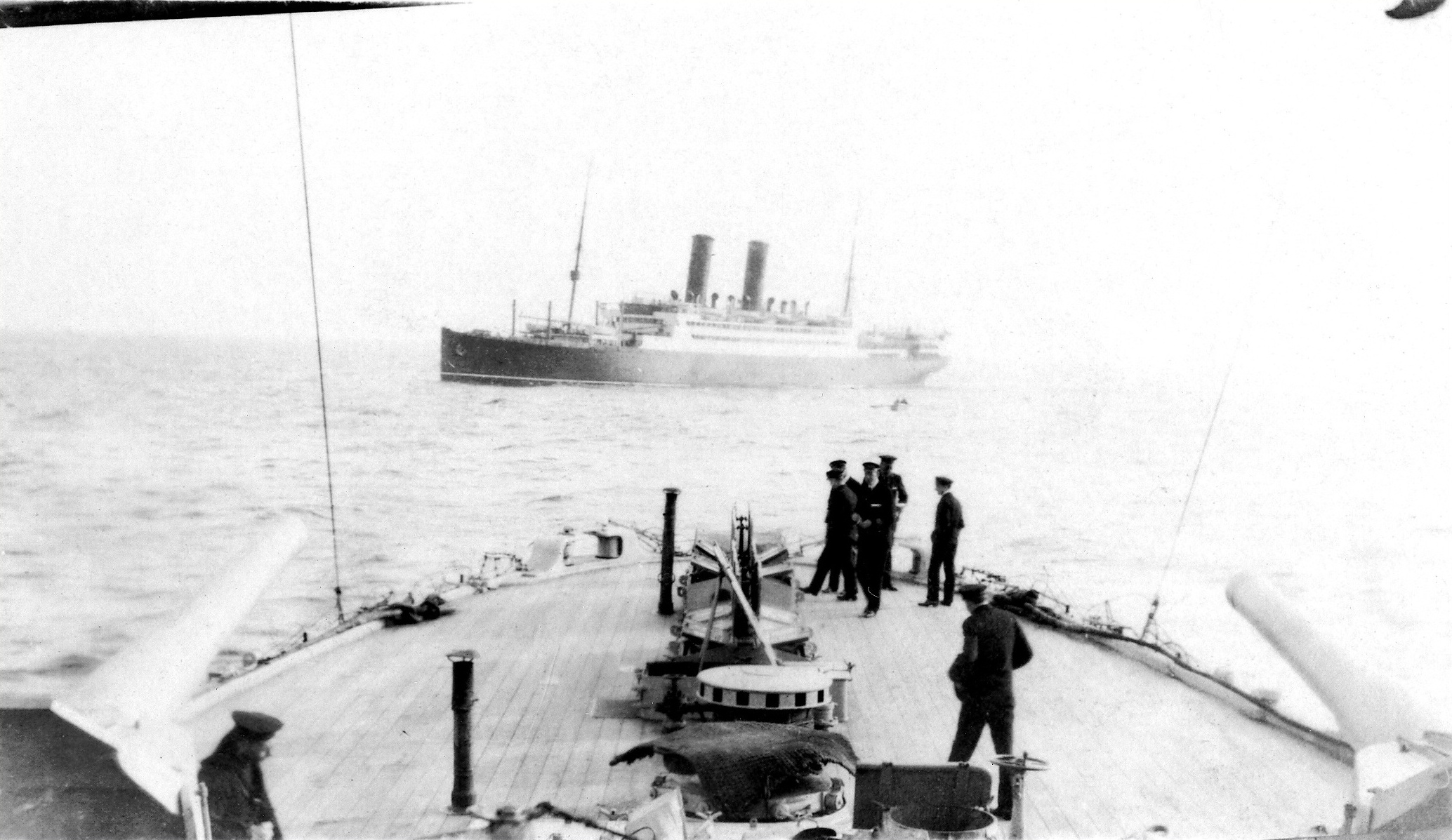
HMCS Niobe stops a liner for contraband inspection off the American coast, 1914–1915

The early part of the war also saw HMCS Niobe actively patrolling off the coast of New York City as part of British blockading forces, but she returned to Halifax permanently in July 1915 when she was declared no longer fit for service and was converted to a depot ship. She was heavily damaged in the December 1917 Halifax Explosion.

CC-1 and CC-2 spent the first three years of the war patrolling the Pacific; however, the lack of German threat saw them reposted to Halifax in 1917. With their tender, HMCS Shearwater, they became the first warships to transit the Panama Canal flying the White Ensign (the RCN's service flag). Arriving in Halifax on 17 October 1917, they were declared unfit for service and never patrolled again, being scrapped in 1920.

In June 1918, the Canadian hospital ship HMHS Llandovery Castle was deliberately sunk by a U-boat which machine gunned survivors on the water. In terms of the number of dead, the sinking was the most significant Canadian naval disaster of the First World War.

On 5 September 1918, the Royal Canadian Naval Air Service (RCNAS) was formed with a main function to carry out anti-submarine operations using flying boat patrol aircraft. The U.S. Navy's Naval Air Station Halifax, on the eastern shores of the harbour at Eastern Passage, Nova Scotia, was acquired but following the November 11, 1918 Armistice, the RCNAS was discontinued.

== Home Front ==
=== Conscription ===
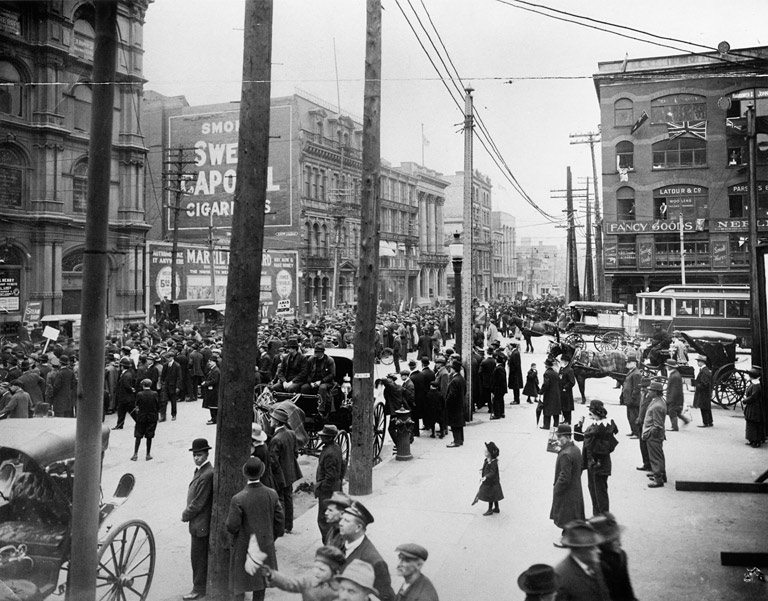
An anti-conscription parade in Montreal on May 17, 1917

The underlying tension between French and British Canada came to national attention during World War I. Prior to the war, the French Canadians did not see themselves obliged to serve the British interests. The issue reached its zenith when Canadian Prime Minister Robert Borden introduced the Canadian Military Service Act of 1917. Although some farmers and factory workers opposed the legislation, it was in Quebec where conscription was most vociferously denounced. Leading the campaign against conscription was Quebec nationalist Henri Bourassa and Sir Wilfrid Laurier, who argued that the war pitted Canadians against each other. In the subsequent election of 1917, Borden was able to convince enough English-speaking Liberals to vote for his party, and the Union government won 153 seats, nearly all from English Canada. The Liberals won 82 seats. Although the Union government won a large majority of seats, the Union government won only 3 seats in Quebec.

Of the 96,000 conscripts listed on strength with the CEF, 47,589 were sent overseas and 24,132 had joined units in France. They arrived in time to aid the rebuilding and reorganization of the Canadian Corps and through the Hundred Days campaign. Despite this, the rift between French- and English-speaking Canadians was indelible and lasted for many years.

=== Indian nationalists ===
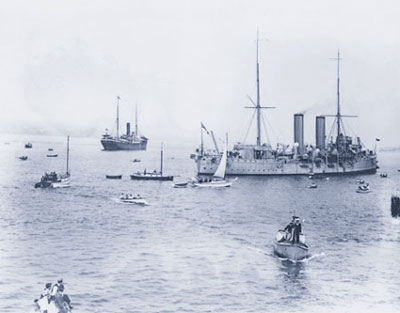
Komagata Maru (left background) being escorted by HMCS Rainbow and a swarm of small boats, 1914

Indian nationalists grouped around the Ghadar Party had been active in Canada for some time, and were involved in the Komagata Maru incident, when the SS Komagata Maru, a ship chartered by Indian immigrants and nationalists was turned around by the Canadian authorities. Upon returning to India, a mixed force of police and soldiers confronted them on September 27, 1914 in Calcutta, which resulted in a riot that killed 19 passengers. Prior to the departure of Komagata Maru, in mid-July local Ghadarite, Mewa Singh, was arrested while re-entering Canada from Sumas, Washington for attempting to bring weapons into Canada. William C. Hopkinson, who had worked as a policeman in India, had infiltrated the Ghadar Party to help to secure his release with a minor fine. Following the murder of two of Hopkinson's informants in the Ghadar Party, Bela Singh, was put on trial in Vancouver. On October 21, 1914, while Hopkinson was waiting outside a courtroom, he was assassinated by Mewa Singh.

=== Saboteurs ===
From the start of the war, the Canadian government investigated many rumours of a large German attack across the Canada–United States border. While most of the rumours were false, Germany did consider several plans to damage Britain by attacking Canada from the United States. One proposal intended to use 100,000 German military reservists allegedly living in North America, who would join 250,000 German Americans and 300,000 anti-British Irish Americans. To maintain secrecy, the army of 650,000 would dress as cowboys; the foreign office's lawyers ruled that a cowboy costume would not be considered a military uniform under international law. Amazingly, the German government did not reject the proposal because of the impracticality, but because it did not wish to damage relations with the United States by violating American neutrality.

The Vanceboro International Bridge after the bombing in 1915.

Taken more seriously was the proposal to sabotage trains carrying Japanese troops which, the German General Staff and foreign office were convinced, would soon arrive in France through Canada. Despite German Ambassador to the United States Johann Heinrich von Bernstorff's disbelief in Japan sending troops to the Western Front, foreign office undersecretary Arthur Zimmermann ordered him to prepare with the embassy's military attaché Franz von Papen plans to attack the Canadian Pacific Railway. Von Papen identified several bridges and tunnels in western Canada as targets, but was advised to wait until the Japanese appeared. His agent, a Captain Böhm, recruited 10 people to enter Canada from Maine and blow up five eastern bridges, but cancelled the mission after only three appeared at the rendezvous point and agreed to the plan.

One who did not appear, Werner Horn, thus did not know that the mission was cancelled. In the Vanceboro international bridge bombing, Horn exploded some dynamite but failed to greatly damage the bridge. Von Papen next formed groups of German reservists in several American cities to attack Canadian bridges and, if the Japanese took the Panama Canal, its locks. The saboteurs did not have uniforms, however, and the general staff told the foreign office on 11 February 1915 that wearing cockades and armbands would not protect them from being shot as francs-tireurs. This news discouraged the volunteers and ended the mission. The German government continued to create such plans, however, resulting in the Zimmermann telegram.

=== Women ===
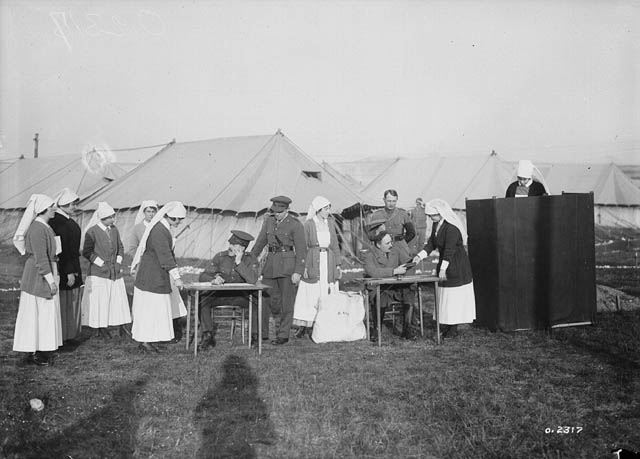
On Sept. 20, 1917, women gained a limited right to vote. The nursing sisters at the Canadian hospital in France were among the first group of women to vote in any general election

Canadian women took part in the war in a variety of ways, including factory work, fundraising and serving as nurses overseas. These women had a large impact on the war effort both from home and on the front lines. Others worked to support soldiers. They volunteered to knit socks, roll bandages, and wrap food parcels for the troops. Women put on variety shows and used the money to buy supplies that were needed overseas. The shortage of men made it necessary for women to work outside the home. They often took jobs that were known as men's work. They worked in banks, insurance firms, civil service, and as gas jockeys, streetcar conductors and fish cannery workers. Even though they performed the same jobs as men, they were paid less. When prime minister Robert Borden ordered compulsory military service in May 1917, many women were called upon to run farms, build aircraft and ships, and work in munitions factories. One of the main contributions Canadian women made was working as nurses with the Canadian Red Cross; this work was often described as an extension of women’s roles as mothers and caregivers, and maternal imagery helped attract public support and gave women more influence in the male-dominated public sphere. Women also gained leadership opportunities within the Red Cross, although its national executive remained largely male. Women predominated in local branches and auxiliaries, and some gained senior positions. Women’s responsibilities on the home front also included supporting the families of soldiers. Government separation allowances and assistance from the Canadian Patriotic Fund helped sustain households when men enlisted. Educated, middle-class women were also given low-cost and qualified supervisors for poor mothers. Assistance could involve oversight of family life as well as material support, while enlistment placed men’s responsibilities as breadwinners alongside their obligations to serve. Women’s nursing service in the war included both trained military nursing sisters and civilian assistants in voluntary aid detachments (VADs). Most Canadian and Newfoundland VADs worked in convalescent hospitals at home, although some served overseas. They were regarded as natural caregivers to soldiers in the field and were promoted as the counterpart of masculine military patriotism. Tensions existed between VADs and qualified career nurses due to the contested space of hospital wards and the authority of nursing professionals. By the end of the war they had earned the right to vote, and were gaining independence in society.

== Influence on Canada ==
=== National identity ===
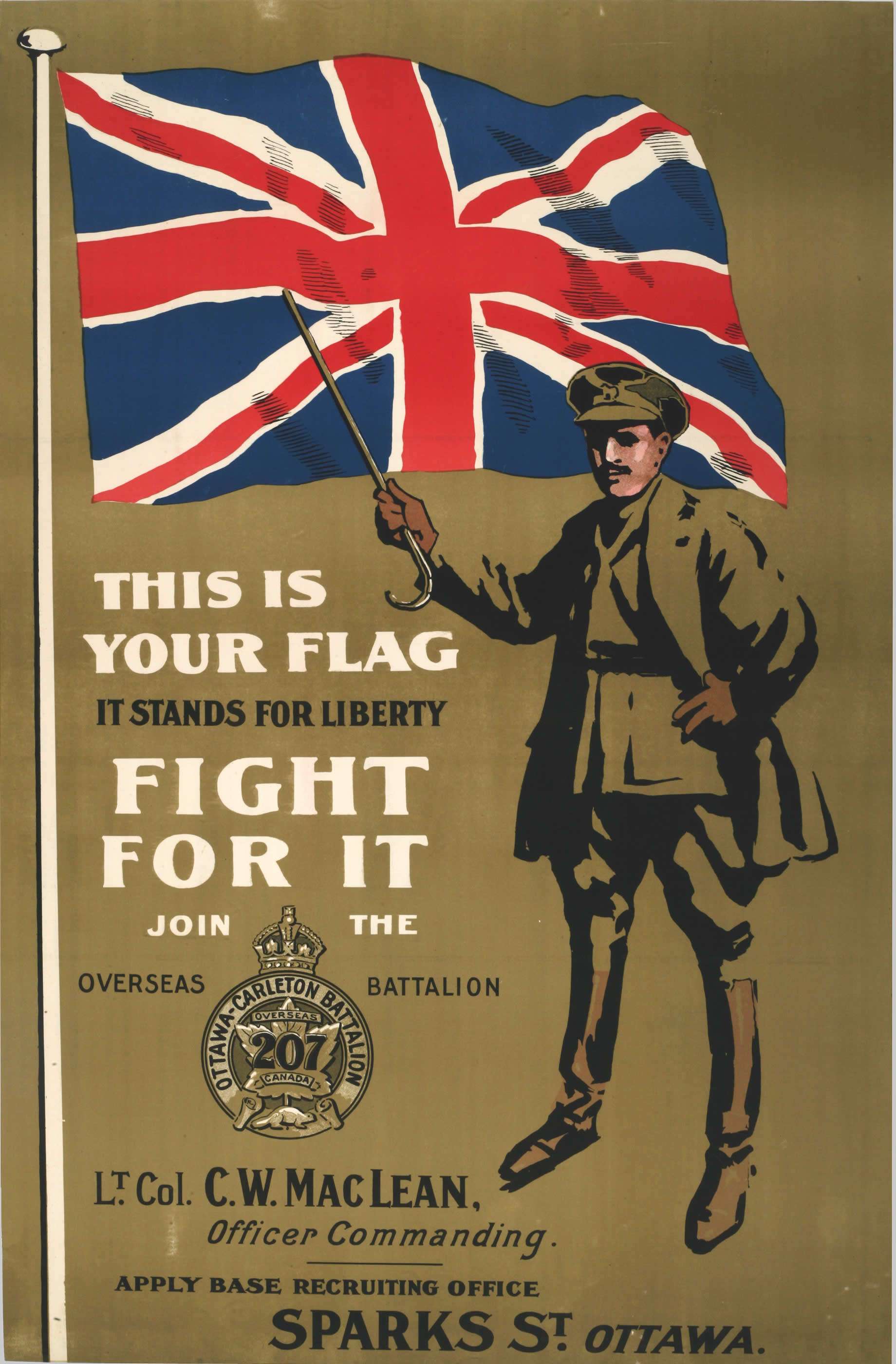
A recruitment poster for the 207th (Ottawa-Carleton) Battalion, CEF, with the Union Flag.

The impact of the First World War on the evolution of Canada's identity is debated by historians. There is general agreement that in the early twentieth century, most English-speaking Canadians saw no conflict between their identity as British subjects and their identities as Canadians. In fact, the British World or British Empire identity was a key part of the Canadian identity. Many Canadians defined their country as the part of North America that owed allegiance to the British Crown. Historian Carl Berger showed that there were relatively few dissenters from this view in English-speaking Canada. In 1914, most English-speaking Canadians had a hybrid imperial-national identity.

Other historians add that Canadian nationalism and belief in independence from the British Empire was strongest in French Canada, whereas imperialism was strongest in English-speaking Canada. These historians focus on Henri Bourassa, who resigned from Wilfrid Laurier's cabinet to protest the decision to send Canadian troops to fight in the South African War. Bourassa's resignation is widely regarded as involving a clash between imperialism and Canadian nationalism.

Some historians suggest that Canada was already beginning to move toward greater autonomy from Britain well before 1914. They note that Canada's government established a Department of External Affairs, or de facto foreign ministry, in 1909. However, these historians also stress that the Department worked closely with British diplomats. Historian Oscar Skelton noted that Alexander Galt, a Canadian government official, negotiated treaties with foreign countries such as Spain and France in the 1880s with only the token participation of British diplomats. These negotiations were precedents followed by Canadian diplomats after 1919, when Canada began to conduct its foreign relations without the involvement of British officials. In other words, Canada's gradual move towards independence was already underway before 1914, although this process may have been accelerated by World War I.

Canadian National Vimy Memorial, is a war memorial on the site of the Battle of Vimy Ridge. Canadian media has occasionally referred to the battle as marking "the birth of a nation".

While there is a consensus that on the eve of World War I, most White English-speaking Canadians had a hybrid imperial-national identity, the effects of the war on Canada's emergence as a nation are contested. The Canadian media often refer to World War I and, in particular, the Battle of Vimy Ridge, as marking "the birth of a nation." Some historians consider the First World War to be Canada's "war of independence" and the most important event in Canadian history, ahead of World War II and comparable in effect to the American Civil War on the United States. They argue that the war reduced the extent to which Canadians identified with the British Empire and intensified their sense of being Canadians first and British subjects second. These historians posit two possible mechanisms whereby World War I intensified Canadian nationalism, that pride in Canada's accomplishments on the battlefield promoted Canadian patriotism; and that the war distanced Canada from Britain in that Canadians reacted to the sheer slaughter on the Western Front by adopting an increasingly anti-British attitude.

Other historians robustly dispute the view that World War I undermined the hybrid imperial-national identity of English-speaking Canada. Phillip Buckner writes that: "The First World War shook but did not destroy this Britannic vision of Canada. It is a myth that Canadians emerged from the war alienated from, and disillusioned with, the imperial connection." He argues that most English-speaking Canadians "continued to believe that Canada was, and should continue to be, a "British" nation and that it should cooperate with the other members of the British family in the British Commonwealth of Nations." Historian Pat Brennan has shown that the war strengthened Canadian officers' British identity as well as their Canadian identity.

Still other historians point out that the war's impact on Canadians’ perception of their place in the world was limited by the simple fact that so many of the Canadian Expeditionary Force soldiers were British-born rather than Canadians. Geoffrey Hayes, Andrew Iarocci, and Mike Bechthold point out that about half of the CEF members who fought at the famous battle of Vimy Ridge were British immigrants. Moreover, their victory at the ridge involved close cooperation with artillery and other units recruited in the British Isles. 70 percent of the men who enlisted in the CEF were British immigrants, even though British immigrants were just 11 percent of Canada's population. Anglo-Saxon Canadians whose ancestors had lived in North America for generations had low enlistment rates similar to those seen in French Canadian communities.

Historian José Igartua argues that the hybrid imperialist-nationalist identity in English Canada collapsed in the 1950s and 1960s, not during or immediately after the First World War. It was in this period that Canada adopted its current flag and began to oppose Britain on substantive foreign policy issues, as it did in the 1956 Suez Crisis. Historian C.P. Champion argues that Canada's Britishness was not eliminated in the 1960s but survives to the present day in more subtle forms. He cites the new flag, whose red and white echo the colours of England and Kingston's Royal Military College.

=== Art and literature ===
- "In Flanders Fields" by Canadian Expeditionary Force member John McCrae may be the best-known poem among Canadians. Written after the Second Battle of Ypres, it and the remembrance poppy it inspired have become symbols of Remembrance Day throughout the Commonwealth.
- Rilla of Ingleside (1921), the next-to-last book in Lucy Maud Montgomery's Anne of Green Gables series, uses the war as a backdrop. The book chronicles the experiences of Anne and her family at home in Canada in the war while waiting for the return of Anne's three sons, all of whom are fighting overseas. The book is the only contemporary novel about the war from the perspective of Canadian women.

== See also ==
- Canadian pipers in World War I
- Canadian war memorials
- List of Canadian battles during World War I
- List of Canadian soldiers executed during World War I
- List of Canadian Victoria Cross recipients
- History of the Royal Canadian Navy
- History of Canadian foreign relations

== Official bibliography ==
National Defence and the Canadian Forces

- Brereton Greenhous; Stephen J. Harris (1992) Canada And The Battle Of Vimy Ridge, 9–12 April 1917 Archived 22 May 2013 at the Wayback Machine Minister Supply and Service (Downloadable PDF) ISBN 0-660-93654-2
- Duguid, A.F, (1938) Official History of the Canadian Forces in the Great War, 1914–1919, Vol I Part I Archived 2014-08-08 at the Wayback Machine King's Printer, Ottawa, (Downloadable PDF)
- Duguid, A.F, (1938) Official History of the Canadian Forces in the Great War, 1914–1919, Vol I Part 2 Archived 2014-08-08 at the Wayback Machine King's Printer, Ottawa, (Downloadable PDF)
- Nicholson, G.W.L. (1964) Official History of the Canadian Army in the First World War: Canadian Expeditionary Force, 1914–1919 Archived 2014-08-08 at the Wayback Machine, Duhamel, Queen's Printer and Controller of Stationery, Ottawa (Downloadable PDF)
- Macphail, Sir Andrew (1925) Official History of the Canadian Forces in the Great War: The Medical Services Archived 2014-08-08 at the Wayback Machine, F.A. Acland, King's Printer, Ottawa (Downloadable PDF)
- Ministry of Overseas Military Forces (1919) Report of the Ministry Overseas Military Forces of Canada – 1918 Archived 2012-05-31 at the Wayback Machine, London : H.M. Stationery Office (Downloadable PDF)
- Snell, A.E. (1924) The C.A.M.C. with the Canadian Corps during the Last Hundred Days of the Great War Archived 2012-06-03 at the Wayback Machine, F.A. Acland, King's Printer, Ottawa (Downloadable PDF)
