= Canada (ship) =

Canada may refer to the name of a number of ships;

== Sailing ships ==
- Canada (1786 ship), a ship launched as Adriatic in 1782, renamed in 1786 to Canada, that served as a whaling and seal hunting ship until she was wrecked in 1800
- Canada (1800 ship), a 393-ton merchant and convict transport built in 1800 at Shields and last listed in 1832
- Canada (1811 ship) was launched at Montreal in 1811 and that same year was re-registered at Glasgow. She made one voyage carrying settlers to South Africa in 1819, but spent most of her career sailing across the Atlantic between England and North America. She underwent a major mishap in 1836, but was salvaged. She was last listed in 1838.
- Canada (1819), a 216-ton ship built in 1819 at Sunderland
- Canada (1823), a 528-ton ship built in 1823 at New York
- Canada (1831), a 330-ton ship built in 1831 at Greenock
- Canada (1838), a 532-ton barque built in 1838 at Maryport
- Canada (1839), a 282-ton snow built in 1839 at Sunderland
- Canada (1891), a 2,301-ton ship built in 1891 at Kingsport, Nova Scotia, Canada's largest sailing ship at her launch.

== Other ==
- HMCS Canada, ship of the Royal Canadian Navy
- HMS Canada, several ships of the Royal Navy
- SS Canada (1896), the first twin-screw steamship operated between Liverpool and Montreal
- RMS Canada, an America-class steamship
