= CGS Margaret =

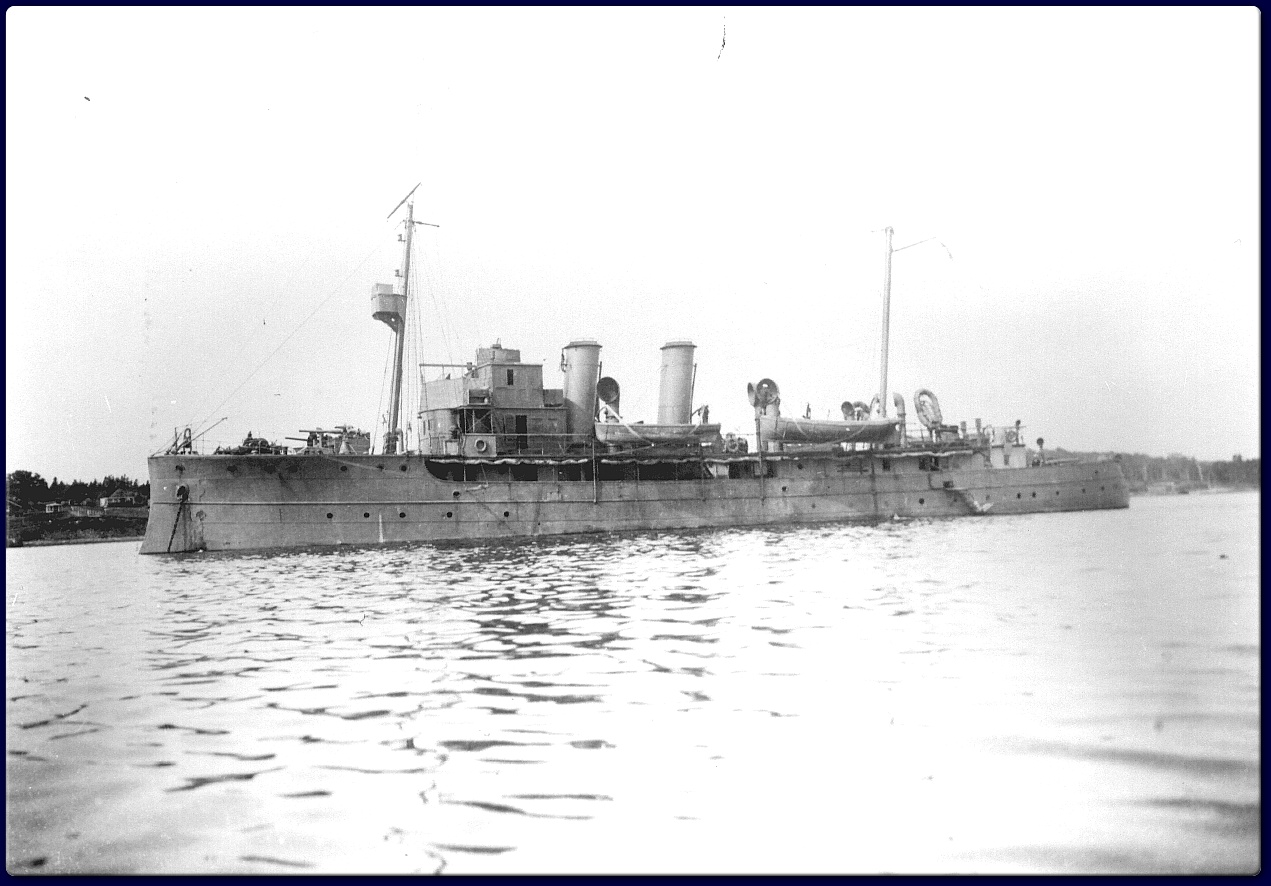
- As HMCS Margaret, armed with two 6-pounder guns forward

History

Canada
- Name: Margaret
- Owner: Department of Marine and Fisheries (Canada)
- Operator: Customs and Preventative Service Canada (1914–1915, 1919–1932)
- Builder: Thornycroft, Woolston Works
- Launched: 1914
- Acquired: 1914
- In service: 1914
- Out of service: 1915
- In service: 1919
- Out of service: 1932
- Stricken: 1932
- Fate: Sold for private use

Canada
- Name: Margaret
- Acquired: 1915
- Commissioned: 1915
- Decommissioned: 1919
- Fate: Returned to civilian use

Brazil
- Name: Rio Branco
- Acquired: 1932
- Commissioned: 1932
- Fate: Discarded 1958

General characteristics
- Type: Patrol ship
- Tonnage: 756 GRT
- Length: 182 ft 4 in (55.6 m)
- Beam: 32 ft 3 in (9.8 m)
- Draught: 15 ft 0 in (4.6 m)
- Propulsion: 1 × steam triple expansion engine, 2 × screws; 6,000 ihp (4,474 kW)
- Speed: 15.5 knots (28.7 km/h; 17.8 mph)
- Armament: 2 × QF 6 pdr (3 kg) guns (as ordered); 1 × 6 pdr guns (as refitted in 1927)

CGS Margaret was the first vessel to be built specifically for the Canadian Customs Preventive Service. Delivered in 1914, she was transferred to the Royal Canadian Navy and served as HMCS Margaret during the First World War. (Note: CGS stands for Canadian Government Ship and HMCS stands for His Majesty's Canadian Ship) Following the war, Margaret was returned to the Customs Preventive Service spending most of the 1920s intercepting smugglers during American Prohibition. In 1932 the ship was transferred to the Royal Canadian Mounted Police. The ship was sold shortly thereafter, and was subsequently acquired by the Brazilian Navy and renamed Rio Branco, utilized as a hydrographic survey vessel. Rio Branco was discarded in 1958.

== Description ==
Margaret was 182 feet 4 inches (55.6 m) long with a beam of 32 feet 3 inches (9.8 m) and a draught of 15 feet 0 inches (4.6 m). The ship had a gross register tonnage (GRT) of 756 tons. The ship was powered by a steam triple expansion engine initially fuelled by coal driving two screws rated at 2,000 indicated horsepower (1,491 kW). The vessel had a maximum speed of 15.5 knots (28.7 km/h; 17.8 mph) and was armed with two unique QF 6-pounder (2.7 kg) guns forward. Due to the unique design of the guns, the amount of ammunition was limited. The ship was later converted to use oil fuel and in 1927, was rearmed with one 6-pounder gun and 17 rifles. In Brazilian service, the vessel had a complement of 91, was armed with two 6-pounder guns and had a displacement of 896 long tons (910 t).

== Service history ==
=== Construction and First World War ===
CGS Margaret was constructed by Thornycroft's Woolston Works at their yard in Southampton, United Kingdom in 1914 and delivered to the Department of Customs at Halifax, Nova Scotia in April 1914. The first ship ordered specifically for the Customs and Preventative Service (CPS), armed with her two 6-pounder guns, she was suitable for a patrol vessel, and given her similarities to a 1907 coastal defence cruiser that was never built, Margaret may in fact have been ordered in anticipation of war with Germany. CGS Margaret became HMCS Margaret when she was transferred, together with CGS Canada, to the Royal Canadian Navy on 4 August 1914 following the outbreak of the First World War. In CPS service, the ship was replaced by chartered ships. Commissioned on 3 February 1915, the CPS crew were given the option of joining the Royal Canadian Navy. All of them declined and in order to keep the ship active, the Royal Canadian Navy was forced to borrow personnel from the British Royal Navy until sufficient Canadian personnel could be found. Margaret was used as an escort and patrol vessel in Atlantic coastal waters during the war, and was one of the first vessels in which Rear Admiral Leonard W. Murray served as a midshipman. The ship was initially assigned to patrol the approaches to Halifax and employed until June, when the ship was laid up at Halifax to re-tube a boiler. On 15 July 1915, Margaret and Sinmac were the first two vessels to arrive at Sydney, Nova Scotia to begin patrolling the Gulf of St. Lawrence. In October, Sinmac was replaced by Sable II and Margaret's captain, Commander Burrard Smith became the senior officer of the Gulf patrol. In 1916, Margaret began patrolling the Cabot Strait. On 13 December, Margaret was sent to search for the disabled HMCS Grilse which had been damaged in a storm. Grilse was able to make Shelburne, Nova Scotia under her own power, but Margaret was tasked with towing the damaged vessel to Halifax for refit.

In 1917, Margaret returned to her patrol route in the Gulf of St. Lawrence, based again at Sydney. Margaret was alongside at Dockyard Jetty 2 in Halifax Harbour during the Halifax Explosion. She broke her moorings and suffered minor damage, while two of her crew were killed ashore. Commander Walter Hose, the commander of the Canadian Atlantic Patrol, sought to rearm the ship with more capable 4-inch (102 mm) guns positioned aft, but this never came to pass. In 1918, the appearance of German U-boats along the east coast of North America led to the creation of coastal convoys. In August, Margaret was tasked with patrolling east of the Magdalen Islands. In September, Margaret and Canada escorted HC convoys from Gaspé, Quebec through the Strait of Belle Isle.

=== Interwar Canadian service ===
Following the end of the war, HMCS Margaret was returned to the CPS in December 1918, and carried out her first patrols in the Gulf of St. Lawrence and on the East Coast of Canada in early 1919. Based at Gaspé, the ship's patrol was later extended into the Northumberland Strait as alcohol smuggling increased during American Prohibition. Due to the limits of CPS authority, all of the seizures made by Margaret between 1921 and 1923 were disallowed. However, in 1923, a memorandum by the department declared the Gulf of St. Lawrence and its estuaries and bays Canadian waters and vessels within the 3-nautical-mile (5.6 km; 3.5 mi) limit would be subject to Canadian law. By October, Margaret and fellow CPS ship CGS Bayfield had intercepted eleven vessels. In 1932, the CPS was absorbed by the Royal Canadian Mounted Police (RCMP), and the service's personnel and ships were transferred to the RCMP's Marine Section.

=== Brazilian service ===
Following the transfer of the CPS's responsibilities to the RCMP in 1932, the number of personnel was reduced and some former CPS vessels were discarded. Margaret was among the CPS vessels sold later that year as a result of these cutbacks. Taken over by the Brazilian government, she was renamed Rio Branco and was converted to a hydrographic survey ship for the Brazilian Navy in 1935. Rio Branco was discarded in 1958.

== Sources ==
- Blackman, Raymond V. B., ed. (1953). Jane's Fighting Ships 1953–54. London: Sampson, Low and Marston. OCLC 913556389.
- Johnston, William; Rawling, William G.P.; Gimblett, Richard H. & MacFarlane, John (2010). The Seabound Coast: The Official History of the Royal Canadian Navy, 1867–1939. Vol. 1. Toronto: Dundurn Press. ISBN 978-1-55488-908-2.
- Macpherson, Ken & Barrie, Ron (2002). The Ships of Canada's Naval Forces 1910–2002 (Third ed.). St. Catharines, Ontario: Vanwell Publishing. ISBN 1-55125-072-1.
- Maginley, Charles D. & Collin, Bernard (2001). The Ships of Canada's Marine Services. St. Catharines, Ontario: Vanwell Publishing Limited. ISBN 1-55125-070-5.
- McDougall, David J. (October 1995). "The Origins and Growth of the Canadian Customs Preventive Service Fleet in the Maritime Provinces and Eastern Quebec, 1892–1932". The Northern Mariner. V (4). ISSN 1183-112X.
- Tucker, Gilbert Norman (1962). The Naval Service of Canada, Its Official History – Volume 1: Origins and Early Years. Ottawa: King's Printer. OCLC 840569671.
