= HMS Canada =

Four ships of the Royal Navy have been named HMS Canada, after the former British colony and contemporary country of Canada:

- HMS Canada (1765) was a 74-gun third rate ship of the line launched in 1765. She became a prison ship in 1810, and was sold broken up in 1834.
- HMS Canada was to have been a 112-gun Wolfe-class first rate. She was laid down in 1814, but cancelled in 1832 and broken up on the stocks.
- HMS Canada (1881) was a screw corvette launched in 1881 and sold in 1897.
- HMS Canada (1913) was a battleship that the Chilean Navy had ordered as Almirante Latorre. She was launched in 1913, but the British government purchased her in 1914 after the outbreak of the First World War. The British government resold her to Chile in 1920, and as Almirante Latorre she served the Chilean Navy until she was broken up in Japan after 1959.

== Battle honours ==
Ships named HMS Canada are entitled to carry the following battle honours:

- St. Kitts 1782
- The Saints 1782
- Donegal 1798
- Jutland 1916

== See also ==
- Canada (ship)
- HMCS Canada
- RMS Canada, an America-class steamship
