= List of shipwrecks in October 1835 =

The list of shipwrecks in October 1835 includes ships sunk, foundered, wrecked, grounded or otherwise lost during October 1835.

== 1 October ==
List of shipwrecks: 1 October 1835
Ship	State	Description
Culombe	United Kingdom	The ship was wrecked on the Galloper Sand, in the North Sea off the coast of Essex. Her crew were rescued. She was on a voyage from Antwerp, Belgium to Liverpool, Lancashire.
Frances	United Kingdom	The ship was driven ashore at Ballyteague, County Kildare.
Solway	United Kingdom	The steamship was driven ashore in the Menai Strait. She was on a voyage from Liverpool to Drogheda, County Louth.

== 2 October ==
List of shipwrecks: 2 October 1835
Ship	State	Description
Anna	United Kingdom	The ship was driven ashore and wrecked at Portobello, Sussex. Her crew were rescued. She was on a voyage from London to a Spanish port.
Harminia	France	The ship was driven ashore and wrecked on Gotland, Sweden. She was on a voyage from Saint Petersburg, Russia to Rouen, Seine-Inférieure.
Ocean	United States	The ship was driven ashore and wrecked at Ramsgate, Kent, United Kingdom All on board were rescued. She was on a voyage from Hamburg to New Orleans, Louisiana.

== 3 October ==
List of shipwrecks: 3 October 1835
Ship	State	Description
Agnes	United Kingdom	The ship struck the Lille Ground, off Dragoe and was abandoned by her crew. She was on a voyage from Saint Petersburg, Russia to London.
Deux Amis	France	The ship was wrecked at Les Sables-d'Olonne, Vendée. Her crew were rescued.
George	United Kingdom	The ship departed from Newcastle upon Tyne, Northumberland for Dort, South Holland, Netherlands. No further trace, presumed foundered in the North Sea with the loss of all hands.
Pensher	United Kingdom	The ship was driven ashore in the Shetland Islands. She was on a voyage from Arkhangelsk, Russia to Hull, Yorkshire. Pensher was later refloated, arriving at Hull, Yorkshire in mid-November.

== 4 October ==
List of shipwrecks: 4 October 1835
Ship	State	Description
Tidd	United Kingdom	The ship was wrecked on the Elbe End Sands. She was on a voyage from Dundee, Forfarshire to Glasgow, Renfrewshire.

== 5 October ==
List of shipwrecks: 5 October 1835
Ship	State	Description
Jeune Emilie	France	The ship was driven ashore on Saaremaa, Russia. Her crew were rescued. She was on a voyage from Saint Petersburg, Russia to Dunkirk, Nord.

== 6 October ==
List of shipwrecks: 6 October 1835
Ship	State	Description
Diligence	United Kingdom	The ship was driven ashore and wrecked at Karlskrona, Sweden. She was on a voyage from Leith, Lothian to Saint Petersburg, Russia.
Increase	United Kingdom	The yawl capsized in the North Sea off Great Yarmouth, Norfolk with the loss of seven of her nine crew.
Lero	United Kingdom	The ship foundered in the North Sea off St. Abb's Head, Berwickshire. Her crew were rescued by Alexander (United Kingdom). Lero was on a voyage from Grangemouth, Stirlingshire to Wisbech, Cambridgeshire.

== 7 October ==
List of shipwrecks: 7 October 1835
Ship	State	Description
Atlantic	United Kingdom	The ship was wrecked in Algoa Bay.
Cape Breton	United Kingdom	The ship was wrecked in Algoa Bay.
Culloden	United Kingdom	The ship ran aground and capsized at Sligo. She was on a voyage from Newcastle upon Tyne to Sligo.
Hugh Wallace	United Kingdom	The ship was driven ashore near Cape North, Nova Scotia, British North America.
Urania	United Kingdom	The ship was wrecked in Algoa Bay.

== 8 October ==
List of shipwrecks: 8 October 1835
Ship	State	Description
Yelisaveta (Елисавета, 'Elizabeth')	Imperial Russian Navy	The brig was driven ashore near the entrance of Avacha Bay, 4.8 kilometres (3.0 mi) from the mouth of the ru:Khalaktyrka. Her crew were rescued. She was on a voyage from Okhotsk to Petropavlovsk. Yelisaveta fell apart by 24 December.
Neptunus	Rostock	The ship was driven ashore at Reval, Russia.
Sarah	United Kingdom	The ship sank at Cork. Her crew were rescued. She was on a voyage from Newport, Monmouthshire to Wexford.
St. George	United Kingdom	The ship was driven ashore and wrecked at Baltic Port, Russia. She was on a voyage from Saint Petersburg, Russia to London.
Swift	United Kingdom	The ship foundered in the English Channel off Cap Gris Nez, Pas-de-Calais, France. Her crew were rescued. She was on a voyage from Newcastle upon Tyne, Northumberland to Boulogne, Pas de Calais.

== 9 October ==
List of shipwrecks: 9 October 1835
Ship	State	Description
Charles	United Kingdom	The ship was driven ashore and damaged west of Rye, Sussex with the loss of two of her crew. She was refloated the next day and taken in to Rye. Charles was on a voyage from Sunderland, County Durham to Cherbourg, Seine-Inférieure, France.
Fortuna	Belgium	The ship was wrecked on Bornholm, Denmark. She was on a voyage from Saint Petersburg, Russia to Antwerp.
Ingeborg Margaretha	Norway	The ship departed from Hull, Yorkshire, United Kingdom for Dram. No further trace, presumed foundered with the loss of all hands.
Waterloo	United Kingdom	The ship was driven ashore at Grimsby, Lincolnshire.

== 10 October ==
List of shipwrecks: 10 October 1835
Ship	State	Description
Agenoria	United Kingdom	The ship was driven ashore and wrecked in Coustatine Bay, near Padstow, Cornwall with the loss of all hands. She was on a voyage from Sligo to London.
Charles	France	The ship was driven ashore at Rye, Sussex, United Kingdom with the loss of two of her crew. She was on a voyage from Sunderland, County Durham to Cherbourg, Manche. Charles was later refloated and taken in to Rye.
Concordia	United Kingdom	The ship departed from London for Sunderland and Memel, Prussia. No further trace, presumed foundered with the loss of all hands.
Dauntless	United Kingdom	The ship was sighted off Eyemouth, Berwickshire whilst on a voyage from Great Yarmouth, Norfolk to Grangemouth, Stirlingshire. No further trace, presumed foundered with the loss of all hands.
Emile	France	The ship was struck by lightning at Aux Cayes, Haiti. She was consequently condemned.
Friends	United Kingdom	The ship was wrecked on the Gunfleet Sand, in the North Sea off the coast of Essex. Her crew took to the longboat. They were rescued the next day by a brig and landed at Dover, Kent. She was on a voyage from South Shields, County Durham to London.
Hale	United Kingdom	The ship was run down and sunk in the Menai Strait by the steamship Ormrod (United Kingdom). Her crew were rescued by Ormrod. Hale was on a voyage from Red Wharf Bay, Anglesey to Liverpool, Lancashire.
Industry	United Kingdom	The ship was wrecked at Littlestone-on-Sea, Kent. Her crew were rescued. She was on a voyage from Sunderland to Shoreham-by-Sea, Sussex.
Jane	United Kingdom	The ship was driven ashore and wrecked near "Marven". She was on a voyage from Arkhangelsk, Russia to Liverpool.
John	United Kingdom	The ship was lost at Welsh Hook, Pembrokeshire. She was on a voyage from Newport, Monmouthshire to Bristol, Gloucestershire.
Lark	United Kingdom	The ship foundered in the English Channel off Portsmouth, Hampshire. Her crew survived. She was on a voyage from Tenby, Pembrokeshire to Great Yarmouth, Norfolk.
Nordstjernen	Norway	The ship was driven ashore on Islay, Inner Hebrides, United Kingdom.
Patriote	France	The ship foundered in the English Channel off Beachy Head, Sussex with the loss of all but two of her crew. She was on a voyage from Cardiff, Glamorgan, United Kingdom to Havre de Grâce, Seine-Inférieure.
Taunton	United Kingdom	The ship ran aground and sank at Bridgwater, Somerset. She was on a voyage from Newport to Bridgwater.

== 11 October ==
List of shipwrecks: 11 October 1835
Ship	State	Description
Isabella	United Kingdom	The ship was driven ashore and wrecked west of Thurso, Caithness. Her crew were rescued.
Latona	Lübeck	The ship foundered off the Kõpu Lighthouse, Hiiumaa, Russia. She was on a voyage from Travemünde to Saint Petersburg, Russia.
Mary and Ann	United Kingdom	The ship was driven ashore at Dunfanaghy, County Donegal. She was on a voyage from Liverpool, Lancashire to Killybegs, County Donegal.
Ocean	United Kingdom	The ship sprang a leak and was abandoned off Dunnet Head, Caithness. She was on a voyage from Quebec City, Lower Canada, British North America to Newcastle upon Tyne, Northumberland.
Plough	United Kingdom	The ship was driven ashore and wrecked west of Thurso with the loss of a crew member. She was on a voyage from Bangor to Newcastle upon Tyne, Northumberland.
Whitehaven	United Kingdom	The ship was driven ashore in Killala Bay. She was refloated on 26 October. Whitehaven was on a voyage from LondonDerry to Antigua.

== 12 October ==
List of shipwrecks: 12 October 1835
Ship	State	Description
Industry	United Kingdom	The ship ran aground and sank at Liverpool, Lancashire. She was later refloated. Industry was on a voyage from the Strangford Lough to Liverpool.
Smarta	Belgium	The ship was wrecked on "Drogoe". She was on a voyage from Antwerp to Saint Petersburg, Russia.
Whitehaven	United Kingdom	The ship was driven ashore at Killala, County Mayo. She was on a voyage from LondonDerry to Antigua. Whitehaven was refloated on 26 October.

== 13 October ==
List of shipwrecks: 13 October 1835
Ship	State	Description
Henrietta	flag unknown	The ship was wrecked on Bornholm, Denmark. Her crew were rescued. She was on a voyage from "Ponteaux" to Libava, Courland Governorate. Aship of this name was reported to have been in collision with another vessel off Bornholm and to have foundered.
Imatra	Belgium	The ship was wrecked on Dragoe. She was on a voyage from Antwerp to Saint Petersburg, Russia.
Maria	United Kingdom	The ship was driven ashore and wrecked near Stranraer, Wigtownshire. She was on a voyage from Maryport, Cumberland to an Irish port.

== 14 October ==
List of shipwrecks: 14 October 1835
Ship	State	Description
Freedom	United Kingdom	The ship was lost at Indian Tickle, Labrador, British North America. Her crew were rescued.
Josatian	flag unknown	The ship was run down and sunk in the Baltic Sea east of Seskar. Her crew were rescued. She was on a voyage from Matanzas, Cuba to Kronstadt.
Louisa	(United Kingdom of Great Britain and Ireland) British North America	The schooner was wrecked at Indian Tickle.

== 15 October ==
List of shipwrecks: 15 October 1835
Ship	State	Description
Tserera (Церера, 'Ceres')	Imperial Russian Navy	The frigate was driven ashore and wrecked at Reval. Her crew were rescued. She was refloated on 22 October and taken in to Reval. Subsequently repaired and returned to service.
Hartlepool Packet	United Kingdom	The ship foundered at the mouth of the River Tees.

== 16 October ==
List of shipwrecks: 16 October 1835
Ship	State	Description
Matadore	Denmark	The ship collided with Golconda (United Kingdom in the China Sea and sank. Her crew were rescued by Golconda.

== 17 October ==
List of shipwrecks: 17 October 1835
Ship	State	Description
Maria	Netherlands	The ship foundered in the North Sea off Heligoland. She was on a voyage from Riga, Russia to Amsterdam, North Holland.
Mary	United Kingdom	The ship was wrecked on St Paul Island, Nova Scotia, British North America. Her eleven crew survived; they were rescued about a week later by Molson (United Kingdom).
Providence	United Kingdom	The ship foundered in the Doro Passage. Her crew were rescued by an Austrian ship. She was on a voyage from Genoa, Kingdom of Sardinia to Constantinople, Ottoman Empire.
Trimmer	United Kingdom	The ship was lost in the Los Roques archipelago, Venezuela.

== 19 October ==
List of shipwrecks: 19 October 1835
Ship	State	Description
Antelope	United Kingdom	The ship was driven ashore at Rattray Head, Aberdeenshire. Her crew were rescued. She was on a voyage from Liverpool, Lancashire to Newcastle upon Tyne, Northumberland.
Harton	(United Kingdom of Great Britain and Ireland) British North America	The ship was driven ashore and wrecked at Bay Roberts, Newfoundland. She was on a voyage from Carbonear to Bay Roberts.
Jason	United Kingdom	The ship was abandoned in the Atlantic Ocean.
New Felix	United Kingdom	The ship was wrecked on Abaco. Her crew were rescued. She was on a voyage from Liverpool to Havana, Cuba.
Tyne	United Kingdom	The ship caught fire in the North Sea off Belhaven, Lothian. She was scuttled in shallow water.

== 20 October ==
List of shipwrecks: 20 October 1835
Ship	State	Description
Christopher Grey	United Kingdom	The ship was sighted in the Kattegat whilst on a voyage from Saint Petersburg, Russia to London. No further trace, presumed foundered with the loss of all hands.
Dordon	United Kingdom	The whaler was wrecked in ice in the Davis Strait with the loss of a crew member. Survivors were rescued by Abram, Grenville Bay, Harmony, Lady Jane and Norfolk (all United Kingdom).

== 21 October ==
List of shipwrecks: 21 October 1835
Ship	State	Description
Gem	(United Kingdom of Great Britain and Ireland) New South Wales	The schooner struck a rock in Stoney Creek and was severely damaged. She was on a voyage from Launceston to Hobart, Van Diemen's Land.
John and Mary	United Kingdom	The ship was driven ashore at Shippagan, New Brunswick, British North America. She was on a voyage from Liverpool, Lancashire to Chaleur Bay.

== 22 October ==
List of shipwrecks: 22 October 1835
Ship	State	Description
Acorn	United Kingdom	The ship ran aground on the Scroby Sands, in the North Sea off Great Yarmouth, Norfolk and sank.
Canada	United Kingdom	The ship ran aground on the Skitter Sand, in the River Humber and capsized. She was later beached at Hessle, Yorkshire still on her side. Canada was on a voyage from Quebec City, Lower Canada, British North America to Hull, Yorkshire. She was taken in to Hull on 26 October.
Lavinia	United Kingdom	The ship ran aground on the Scroby Sands and sank.
Margaret	United Kingdom	The ship was lost off Saint Paul Island, Nova Scotia, British North America. Her crew were rescued. She was on a voyage from Chaleur Bay to Ayr.
New Blessing	United Kingdom	The brig was in collision with the ketch Heart of Oak (United Kingdom) in the Bristol Channel between Lundy Island, Devon and Worms Head, Glamorgan. She was consequently abandoned. New Blessing was on a voyage from Cardiff, Glamorgan to Waterford.
Whitecastle	United Kingdom	The smack was lost near Cemaes, Anglesey. Her crew were rescued. She was on a voyage from Wicklow to Liverpool, Lancashire.

== 23 October ==
List of shipwrecks: 23 October 1835
Ship	State	Description
Atlas	United Kingdom	The ship was driven ashore at Berwick upon Tweed, Northumberland. She was on a voyage from Memel, Prussia to Berwick upon Tweed. Atlas was refloated on 3 November.
Canada	United Kingdom	The ship capsized in the Humber. Her crew were rescued. She was on a voyage from Quebec City, Lower Canada, British North America to Hull, Yorkshire.
Essy	United Kingdom	The smack capsized off Point Lynas, Anglesey. Her crew were rescued. She drove ashore and was wrecked at Cemaes, Anglesey on 25 October.
Nancy Blessing	United Kingdom	The brig was in collision with an American vessel in the Bristol Channel. She was anchored on the Helwick Sand but consequently foundered. Her crew survived. She was on a voyage from Cardiff, Glamorgan to Waterford.
Seaton	United Kingdom	The ship was driven ashore at Étaples, Pas-de-Calais, France. Her crew were rescued. She was on a voyage from Newport, Monmouthshire to Hull, Yorkshire.

== 24 October ==
List of shipwrecks: 24 October 1835
Ship	State	Description
Everton	United Kingdom	The ship was driven ashore and sank in the River Mersey. Her crew survived. She was on a voyage from Saint John, New Brunswick, British North America to Liverpool, Lancashire.
Rebecca	United Kingdom	The ship was driven ashore at Aberthaw, Glamorgan. She was on a voyage from Newport, Monmouthshire to Padstow, Cornwall.

== 25 October ==
List of shipwrecks: 25 October 1835
Ship	State	Description
C	United Kingdom	The ship was wrecked on the Barnard Sand, in the North Sea off the coast of Suffolk. Her crew were rescued.
Friends	United Kingdom	The ship was lost off Great Yarmouth, Norfolk. Her crew were rescued.
King George	United Kingdom	The ship was driven ashore and wrecked on the Îles des Saintes, off the coast of Finistère, France. Her crew were rescued. She was on a voyage from Málaga, Spain to London.
Sisters	United Kingdom	The ship departed from Wells-next-the-Sea, Norfolk for Newcastle upon Tyne, Northumberland. She subsequently foundered with the loss of all hands.
Spring	United Kingdom	The ship was in collision with Lord Nelson and foundered in the North Sea off Flamborough Head, Yorkshire. Her crew were rescued.
Teignmouth	United Kingdom	The ship was driven ashore near Worthing, Sussex. She was on a voyage from Plymouth, Devon to Shoreham-by-Sea, Sussex.
Colbert	France	Vessel based in Port Navalo Brittany France. Left Rouen for Saint Malo loaded with copper and earthenware, sank on the coast of Guernsey Channel Islands

== 26 October ==
List of shipwrecks: 26 October 1835
Ship	State	Description
Actif	France	The ship was driven ashore in St Brelade's Bay, Jersey, Channel Islands. She was on a voyage from Saint-Brieuc, Côtes-du-Nord to Bayonne, Basses-Pyrénées.
Ann	United Kingdom	The ship sprang a leak and was abandoned in the North Sea off Whitby, Yorkshire. Her crew were rescued by Young Regulus (United Kingdom). Ann was on a voyage from North Shields, County Durham to London.
Chance	United Kingdom	The ship was wrecked at Montrose, Forfarshire.
Elizabeth	United Kingdom	The ship was lost near Macduff, Aberdeenshire. She was on a voyage from Hamburg to London.
Elizabeth	United Kingdom	The ship was driven ashore and wrecked on Læsø, Denmark. Her crew were rescued. She was on a voyage from Saint Petersburg, Russia to London.
Fisher	United Kingdom	The brig sprang a leak in the North Sea 70 nautical miles (130 km) south of Flamborough Head, Yorkshire. HMS Cleopatra (Royal Navy) attempted to give assistance but she foundered with the loss of all eight hands.
Florist	United Kingdom	The ship was driven ashore near Whitehaven, Cumberland. She was on a voyage from Liverpool, Lancashire to Antwerp, Belgium.
Francis William	United Kingdom	The ship was driven ashore near Banff, Aberdeenshire. Her crew were rescued. she was on a voyage from Portsoy, Aberdeenshire to London.
Friends	United Kingdom	The ship was abandoned off the Haisborough Sands, Norfolk.
Helen	United Kingdom	The ship was driven ashore at Sandend, Aberdeenshire. Her crew were rescued. The Aberdeen Journal claimed the report to be a mistake.
Isabella	United Kingdom	The sloop was driven ashore west of Portsoy. Her crew were rescued. She was on a voyage from Aberdeen to Rosehearty, Aberdeenshire.
John	United Kingdom	The sloop foundered in the Bristol Channel off Neath, Glamorgan with the loss of one of her three crew. The survivors were rescued by the Neath pilot boats. She was on a voyage from Swansea, Glamorgan to Bristol, Gloucestershire.
Margaret	United Kingdom	Captain Ann's schooner was driven ashore at Portland, Dorset with the loss of all hands, at least five lives.
King George	United Kingdom	The ship was wrecked on the Îles des Saintes, Finistère, France. Seven of her crew survived.
Pearce	United Kingdom	The ship was wrecked in Spey Bay. Her crew survived.
Planter	United Kingdom	The ship was driven ashore and damaged at Montrose.
Richardson	United Kingdom	The ship was wrecked near Bangor, County Down. Her crew were rescued.
Strachan	United Kingdom	The ship foundered in the North Sea 90 nautical miles (170 km) east by south of Tynemouth Castle, Northumberland with the loss of all hands. She was on a voyage from Saint Petersburg, Russia to London.
Tin Tin	Norway	The ship was driven ashore at Algorta, Spain. She was refloated in early November and taken in to Bilbao for repairs.
Vigilant	United Kingdom	The ship foundered in the North Sea. Her crew were rescued by the brig Carl (Prussia). Vigilant was on a voyage from Saint Petersburg to London.
Vigilantia	Norway	The galiot was driven ashore at Banff, Aberdeenshire. She was on a voyage from Fraserburgh, Aberdeenshire to Wick, Caithness, United Kingdom.

== 27 October ==
List of shipwrecks: 27 October 1835
Ship	State	Description
Ann	United Kingdom	The ship was abandoned in the North Sea. Her crew were rescued by Neva (United Kingdom). She was on a voyage from South Shields, County Durham to London.
Elizabeth	United Kingdom	The ship sprang a leak and sank at Saint Petersburg, Russia.

== 28 October ==
List of shipwrecks: 28 October 1835
Ship	State	Description
Elizabeth	Norway	The ship was lost at "Fahrsund". Her crew were rescued.
Isabella	United Kingdom	The ship was driven ashore near Banff, Aberdeenshire Her crew were rescued.
Johanna	Hamburg	The ship departed from Havana, Cuba for Hamburg. No furthertrace, presumed foundered with the loss of all hands.
Providence	United Kingdom	The ship was wrecked on a reef off the Isle of Arran. Her crew were rescued. She was on a voyage from Galway to Liverpool, Lancashire.
Tiger	United Kingdom	The ship ran aground and was wrecked off Formby, Lancashire, She was on a voyage from Glasgow, Renfrewshire to Liverpool, Lancashire.
Tin Tin	Spain	The ship was driven ashore at Algorta. She was on a voyage from Bergen, Norway to Bilbao.

== 29 October ==
List of shipwrecks: 29 October 1835
Ship	State	Description
Argus	United Kingdom	The ship sprang a leak and was abandoned in the Atlantic Ocean. She was on a voyage from Quebec City, Lower Canada, British North America to Plymouth, Devon.
Fawn	United Kingdom	The smack was run down and sunk in the River Thames off Woolwich, Kent by the steamship Royal Adelaide (United Kingdom) with the loss of two of the four people on board. Fawn was on a voyage from Whitstable, Kent to London.
Henry Cox	United Kingdom	The ship was wrecked on the Scroby Sands, in the North Sea off the coast of Norfolk.
John and Mary	United Kingdom	The ship caught fire at Rotterdam, South Holland, Netherlands and was scuttled. She was on a voyage from London to Delfshaven, South Holland.
Nestor	United Kingdom	The ship was wrecked on the Saddle Back Island Reef. She was on a voyage from Port Wallace, Nova Scotia, British North America to Liverpool, Lancashire.

== 31 October ==
List of shipwrecks: 31 October 1835
Ship	State	Description
Eliza	United Kingdom	The schooner was driven ashore and wrecked between Tarlair, Aberdeenshire and "Melrose" with the loss of two of her four crew, a fifth member having been washed overboard two days earlier. Survivors were rescued by rocket apparatus.
Houghton-le-Spring	United Kingdom	The ship was lost near Pellinki, Grand Duchy of Finland. She was on a voyage from London to Saint Petersburg, Russia.
Lark	United Kingdom British North America	The ship capsized in the Atlantic Ocean with the loss of a crew member. She was on a voyage from Yarmouth, Nova Scotia to Berbice, British Honduras.
Sir George Murray	United Kingdom	The ship was wrecked on Isle Madame, Nova Scotia. Her crew were rescued. She was on a voyage from Liverpool, Lancashire to Richibucto, New Brunswick, British North America.

== Unknown date ==
List of shipwrecks: Unknown date 1835
Ship	State	Description
Clio	United Kingdom	The brigantine was wrecked in Cayti Bay, Brazil in late October. She was on a voyage from Liverpool, Lancashire to Pará, Brazil. All but one of her crew were murdered by the local inhabitants. The survivor was rescued by HMS Racehorse (Royal Navy).
Eddy	United Kingdom	The ship was wrecked at Cemaes, Anglesey before 27 October. Her crew were rescued.
Emerald	(United Kingdom of Great Britain and Ireland) British North America	The ship was wrecked on a reef (43°30′N 29°00′W) before 6 October.
Everton	United Kingdom	The ship sank in Liverpool Bay before 25 October.
Felix	Brazil	The ship was lost between Rio Grande do Norte and Parnaíba before 6 October. She was on a voyage from Pernambuco to Maranhão.
Heald	United Kingdom	The ship was run down and sunk by Ormerod (United Kingdom) in the Menai Strait. Her crew were rescued.
Henrietta Johanna	Kingdom of Hanover	The ship sprang a leak and was abandoned in the North Sea. She was on a voyage from Sunderland, County Durham, United Kingdom to Emden.
Het Goed Besluit	Netherlands	The ship was driven ashore between Frederikshavn and Skagen, Denmark before 29 October. She was on a voyage from Saint Petersburg, Russia to Rotterdam, South Holland.
Hetty	(United Kingdom of Great Britain and Ireland) New South Wales	The schooner was lost off Maria Island.
Lavinia	United Kingdom	The ship was lost off Great Yarmouth, Norfolk before 24 October.
Lima	United Kingdom	The ship was wrecked on Bornholm, Denmark after 9 October. Her crew were rescued. She was on a voyage from Hull, Yorkshire to Memel, Prussia.
Louise and Amalie	Stettin	The ship capsized off the coast of Norway before 20 October.
Malada	Denmark	The ship collided with Golconda (United Kingdom) in the China Seas before 19 October and was abandoned. Her crew were rescued by Duke of Sussex (United Kingdom) and Golconda.
Meduse	Belgium	The ship was wrecked at the mouth of the Scheldt. She was on a voyage from London to Antwerp.
Nova Amazons	Portugal	The barque was wrecked between "Ponte Negra" and the "Isles of Marcia", Brazil with the loss of 29 of the 44 people on board. She was on a voyage from Lisbon to Rio de Janeiro, Brazil.
St. George	United Kingdom	The ship was wrecked at Reval, Russia before 9 October.
Tim	(United Kingdom of Great Britain and Ireland) Western Australia	The schooner was wrecked in the Swan River.
