= HMCS Grilse =

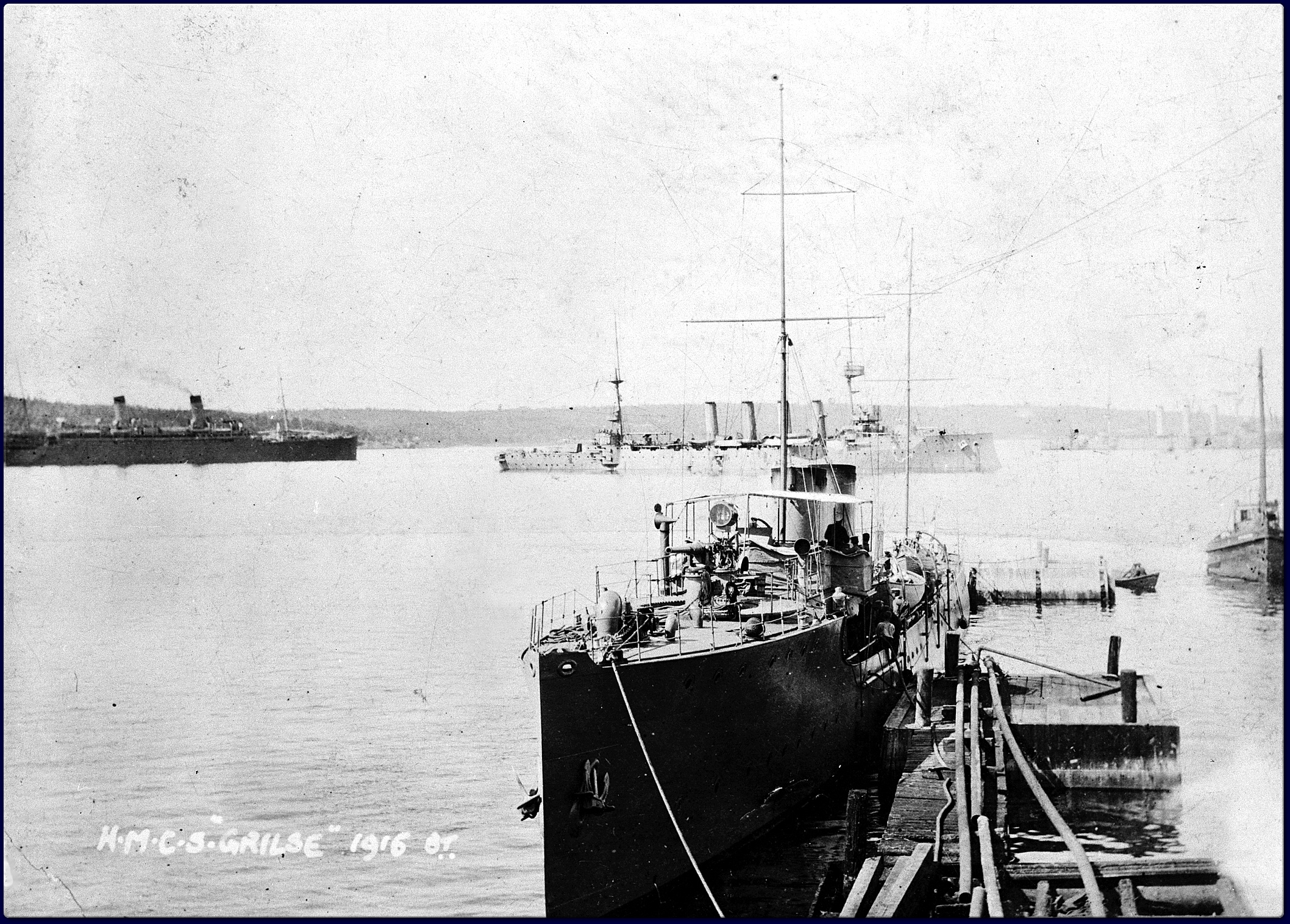
- HMCS Grilse (foreground) in 1916.

History
- Name: Winchester (1912–1915); Trillora (1922–1938)
- Port of registry: United States
- Builder: Yarrow & Co., Glasgow
- Launched: 1912
- Completed: June 1912
- In service: 1912–1915; 1922–1938
- Fate: In service with Royal Canadian Navy 1915–1922; Foundered on 21 September 1938 at Long Island, New York

Canada
- Name: Grilse
- Namesake: Atlantic salmon
- Acquired: June 1915
- Commissioned: 15 July 1915
- Decommissioned: 10 December 1918
- Fate: Sold 1922

General characteristics in Canadian service
- Type: Torpedo boat
- Displacement: 287 long tons (292 t)
- Length: 202 ft 3 in (61.6 m)
- Beam: 18 ft 3 in (5.6 m)
- Draught: 9 ft 2 in (2.8 m)
- Speed: 30 kn (56 km/h; 35 mph)
- Complement: 56
- Armament: 2 × QF 12-pounder 12 cwt naval gun; 1 × 14 in (356 mm) torpedo tube

HMCS Grilse was a commissioned patrol boat of the Royal Canadian Navy during the First World War. Launched in 1912 as the private yacht Winchester of the American industrialist Peter Rouss, the vessel was constructed along the lines of a contemporary Royal Navy torpedo boat destroyer. After the outbreak of war, vessels that could be used by belligerents were prohibited by the government of the then-neutral United States. Canadian millionaire J. K. L. Ross purchased Winchester and returned to Canada with the yacht, where he transferred ownership of the vessel to the Royal Canadian Navy. Renamed Grilse, a pseudonym for Atlantic salmon and converted to a patrol boat, the vessel was deployed as part of Canada's east coast patrol combating the German submarine threat. After the war, she was sold back to private interests, re-converted to a yacht, and renamed Trillora. Trillora foundered in 1938 at Long Island, New York during a hurricane.

== Description and design ==
The vessel was built as the high-speed civilian yacht Winchester by Peter W. Rouss, who was born in Winchester, Virginia. She was built along the lines of a torpedo-boat destroyer with twin funnels, a low hull with little flare in her bow. The vessel had a raised forecastle which extended back to form a compass platform over the saloon. The bridge was and extension of the forecastle deck and was surrounded by a canvas dodger. The tall mast was placed amidships. She was comparable in size to an E-class destroyer from 1901–1904, however Winchester was considered faster due to her turbine engines. The vessel measured 202 feet 3 inches (61.6 m) long between perpendiculars with a beam of 18 feet 3 inches (5.6 m) and a draught of 9 feet 2 inches (2.8 m). As a yacht, Winchester had a gross register tonnage of 275 tons and in naval service, Grilse had a displacement of 287 long tons (292 t). The ship had a maximum speed of 30 knots (56 km/h) and a ship's company of 56 in Canadian service.

== Service history ==
Constructed for Peter Rouss, the son of an industrialist, the yacht was built by Yarrow Shipbuilders at their Scotstoun yard in Glasgow, Scotland. The third of Rouss' vessels named Winchester, the yacht was launched in 1912 and completed in June of that year. In 1915, Canadian industrialist and millionaire Jack Ross was sent to the United States to acquire ships for the Royal Canadian Navy. Ross purchased Winchester for $100,000. At the time, an embargo was in place preventing the sale of any ship to belligerents in the war. The American government discovered the sale and attempted to block the transaction, but Ross managed to get out of the country with the ship. Ross was later reimbursed by the Canadian government.

After arrival in Halifax, Nova Scotia, Winchester was converted for naval use at Canadian Vickers in Montreal. She was armed with two 12-pounder guns, one fore, placed on the forecastle and one aft, placed on the quarterdeck. A 14-inch (356 mm) torpedo tube was sited amidships. The aft deckhouse was removed to make room for the torpedo tube and the three torpedoes that were to be carried on deck. The mast was moved forward to directly behind the bridge and a second mast was installed to give the vessel a horizontal antenna to improve radio communications. There were also some alterations to the crew quarters to make room for the larger number required in a warship.

Grilse was commissioned as a torpedo boat on 15 July 1915 with Ross in command, and operated off Canada's east coast for much of the war. Her intended use as the most powerful Canadian warship on the east coast following the laying up of the cruiser HMCS Niobe, was as the primary offensive unit to any sighting of enemy ships. Spending the better part of her service with the Halifax patrol, she was loaned to the Gulf patrol in September 1915 and operated as a ship escort in the Gulf of St. Lawrence. The vessel was eventually withdrawn from inspection duties along the coast due to the high cost of use and was relegated to patrol duties only.

Unsuitable for winter operations in Canadian waters, Grilse was sent to the Caribbean Sea during the winter months. In 1915, she was sent to Jamaica, running out of fuel on the way and requiring a tow from the cruiser HMS Cumberland. In December 1916 the ship was sent to the Royal Naval Dockyard in the Imperial fortress colony of Bermuda to join the North America and West Indies Station, but encountered a heavy storm on the way and nearly sank. Headquarters actually believed the ship destroyed after they lost communications with Grilse (her antenna had been lost in the storm) and sent out vessels to search for wreckage. However, Grilse had managed to make it back to Shelburne. She was then towed to Halifax for a refit. The ship re-entered service on 10 May 1917 and was used as a patrol ship until August later that year when she returned to the dockyard to undergo repairs. She returned to escort and patrol duty until the end of the war. Grilse was paid off on 10 December 1918.

Attempts to sell Grilse as surplus in 1920 were unsuccessful, and she was used for training purposes in 1921–22 before being sold to Solomon Guggenheim in 1922. The vessel was towed to the United States, refitted as a yacht and renamed Trillora. The ship was still in Guggenheim's ownership when she foundered in Long Island Sound in the New England Hurricane of 1938 on 21 September 1938. The United States Coast Guard ordered the wreck removed and Guggenheim transferred ownership to a salvage company. The yacht's registry was closed in October 1941.

== Sources ==
- Johnston, William; Rawling, William G.P.; Gimblett, Richard H. & MacFarlane, John (2010). The Seabound Coast: The Official History of the Royal Canadian Navy, 1867–1939. Vol. 1. Toronto: Dundurn Press. ISBN 978-1-55488-908-2.
- Macpherson, Ken & Barrie, Ron (2002). The Ships of Canada's Naval Forces 1910–2002 (Third ed.). St. Catharines, Ontario: Vanwell Publishing. ISBN 1-55125-072-1.
- McKee, Fraser (1983). The Armed Yachts of Canada. Erin, Ontario: The Boston Mills Press. ISBN 0-919822-55-X.
- Milner, Marc (2010). Canada's Navy: The First Century (Second ed.). Toronto: University of Toronto Press. ISBN 978-0-8020-9604-3.
- "Winchester (5168891)". Miramar Ship Index.
- Tucker, Gilbert Norman (1962). The Naval Service of Canada, Its Official History – Volume 1: Origins and Early Years. Ottawa: King's Printer. OCLC 840569671.
