= Canada (1811 ship) =

History

United Kingdom
- Name: Canada
- Builder: D. Munn, Montreal
- Launched: 1811
- Fate: Last listed in 1838

General characteristics
- Tons burthen: 268, or 281 (bm)
- Armament: 2 × 4-pounder guns

Canada was launched at Montreal in 1811 and that same year was re-registered at Glasgow. She made one voyage carrying settlers to South Africa in 1819, but spent most of her career sailing across the Atlantic between England and North America. She underwent a major mishap in 1836, but was salvaged. She was last listed in 1838.

== Career ==
Canada was launched at Montreal, was registered at Quebec, and was re-registered at Port Glasgow, Scotland at (Port) No. 14 in 1811 She first appeared in Lloyd's Register in 1812 with J.Frazier, owner and master, and trade Greenock–St Kitts. By 1814 she was sailing between Liverpool and Quebec.

Lloyd's Register for 1820 showed Canada with Amm, master, Winslow, owner, and trade London–CGH. She had undergone small repairs in 1819. On 26 April 1820 Captain Annan and Canada arrived at Table Bay, Cape Town. In mid-May she arrived at her final destination in South Africa where she landed 35 settlers.

A heavy gale drove Canada, Amm, master, out of Plattenberg Bay (Plettenberg Bay) on 22 June, causing her to lose her anchor and cables. She put into Knysna on 10 July to repair.

Year	Master	Owner	Trade	Source & note
1825	J.Pinckney	Straker & co.	Hull–Shields	LR; small repairs 1819
1830	J.Pattison; J.Potts	Straker & Co.	Dublin–Quebec	LR; small repairs 1819
1835	A.Smith	Thompson	Newcastle–America	LR; large repairs 1834 & 1835; homeport S.Shields

Canada ran aground on the Skitter Sand, in the River Humber, on 22 October 1835 and capsized. She was later beached at Hessle, still on her side. Canada was on a voyage from Quebec City to Hull. She was taken in to Hull on 26 October. Her crew was saved.

She underwent a large repair in 1836 and was last listed in 1838.
