= HMCS Canada =

Sunken Canadian cruiser

Coordinates: 24°47′N 080°39′W

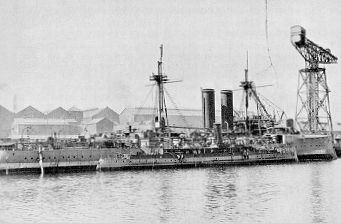
- CGS Canada (front) at Barrow-in-Furness in 1904

History

Canada
- Name: Canada
- Builder: Vickers, Sons & Maxim, Barrow-in-Furness
- Launched: 14 June 1904
- Completed: July 1904
- Renamed: Queen of Nassau (1924)
- Fate: Sold for commercial use, sunk 2 July 1926

General characteristics
- Type: Patrol vessel
- Tonnage: 411 GRT
- Displacement: 557 long tons (566 t)
- Length: 200 ft (61 m) (as ordered); 206 ft (63 m) (modified)
- Beam: 25 ft (7.6 m)
- Draught: 13 ft (4.0 m)
- Installed power: 1,800 ihp (1,300 kW)
- Propulsion: 2 × shafts, triple expansion steam engine
- Speed: 16 knots (30 km/h; 18 mph)
- Complement: 60
- Armament: 4 × 3-pounder guns (as ordered); 2 × 12-pounder and 2 × 3-pounder guns (refit for naval service)

Built in 1904, CGS Canada (Note: CGS stands for Canadian Government Ship and HMCS stands for His Majesty's Canadian Ship) was a patrol vessel, sometimes referred to as a cruiser, operated by the Canadian Department of Marine and Fisheries and, between 1915 and 1919, served as HMCS Canada in the Royal Canadian Navy. Widely regarded as the nucleus of Canada's future naval service, the vessel served as Canada's first naval training ship and played an important role in the development of Canadian naval capability prior to the establishment of the Royal Canadian Navy in 1910. In 1924 the Royal Canadian Navy sold Canada to American businessman Barron Gift Collier. Renamed SS Canada and later SS Queen of Nassau, the vessel was refurbished and placed into first-class passenger service between Miami, Florida, and Nassau, Bahamas. The venture proved commercially unsuccessful and Collier subsequently sold the vessel. In 1926 Mexican commercial interests acquired the ship and intended to place it in service between Tampico, Mexico, and New Orleans, Louisiana in the Gulf of Mexico.

Prior to entering service on the Gulf route, Queen of Nassau departed Miami bound for Tampa, Florida, where it was scheduled to undergo final inspection. Approximately 80 kilometres (50 mi) south of Miami, the vessel's lower compartments began flooding. After the crew battled the incoming water for approximately ninety minutes, the captain ordered the ship abandoned. Queen of Nassau sank on 2 July 1926 in what is now the Florida Keys National Marine Sanctuary. Contemporary newspaper accounts reported that as the vessel settled, its bow rose clear of the water and a boiler explosion occurred before the ship disappeared beneath the surface. The wreck was identified through archaeological investigation conducted by National Oceanic and Atmospheric Administration between 2001 and 2005 and has since become one of the most extensively studied Canadian shipwrecks outside Canadian waters.

== Description ==
Canada was 200 feet (61 m) long as ordered, but ended up 206 ft (63 m) long. The ship had a beam of 25 ft (7.6 m) and a draught of 13 ft (4.0 m). Canada had a ram bow. The ship had a tonnage of 411 gross register tons (GRT) and a displacement of 557 long tons (566 t). The ship was propelled by two shafts powered by a triple expansion steam engine rated at 1,800 indicated horsepower (1,300 kW). The ship's maximum speed is different among the sources, ranging from as low as 14 knots (26 km/h; 16 mph) to as high as 22 knots (41 km/h; 25 mph). (Note: The Miramar Ship Index gives the ship's speed as 16 knots (30 km/h; 18 mph) and Jane's Fighting Ships of World War I claims it was 14 knots.) The ship could carry 110 long tons (110 t) of coal for fuel. The ship was originally armed with four Mark III 1 1/2-pounder quick-firing guns, two mounted forward and two aft, with 75 officers and enlisted personnel. The ship was fitted with four 3-pounder guns in 1912. Between 1915 and 1916, further artillery upgrades were undertaken as part of its transition to frontline naval service during the First World War. The vessel was armed with two 12-pounder guns mounted forward and retained two 3-pounder guns aft, which by the end of the First World War made it closely resemble a modern third-class cruiser in the British Royal Navy. Casserley notes that Canada combined a fisheries protection role with characteristics commonly associated with contemporary naval vessels. Notable features included the pronounced ram bow, raked funnel and a higher maximum speed. Modifications undertaken in 1912 included the addition of a raised forecastle that improved seaworthiness in North Atlantic conditions and contributed to the vessel's later naval appearance. Canada was also fitted with a Marconi wireless, a device just being installed aboard much larger British warships at the time.

== Service history ==
=== Fisheries service and naval training ===
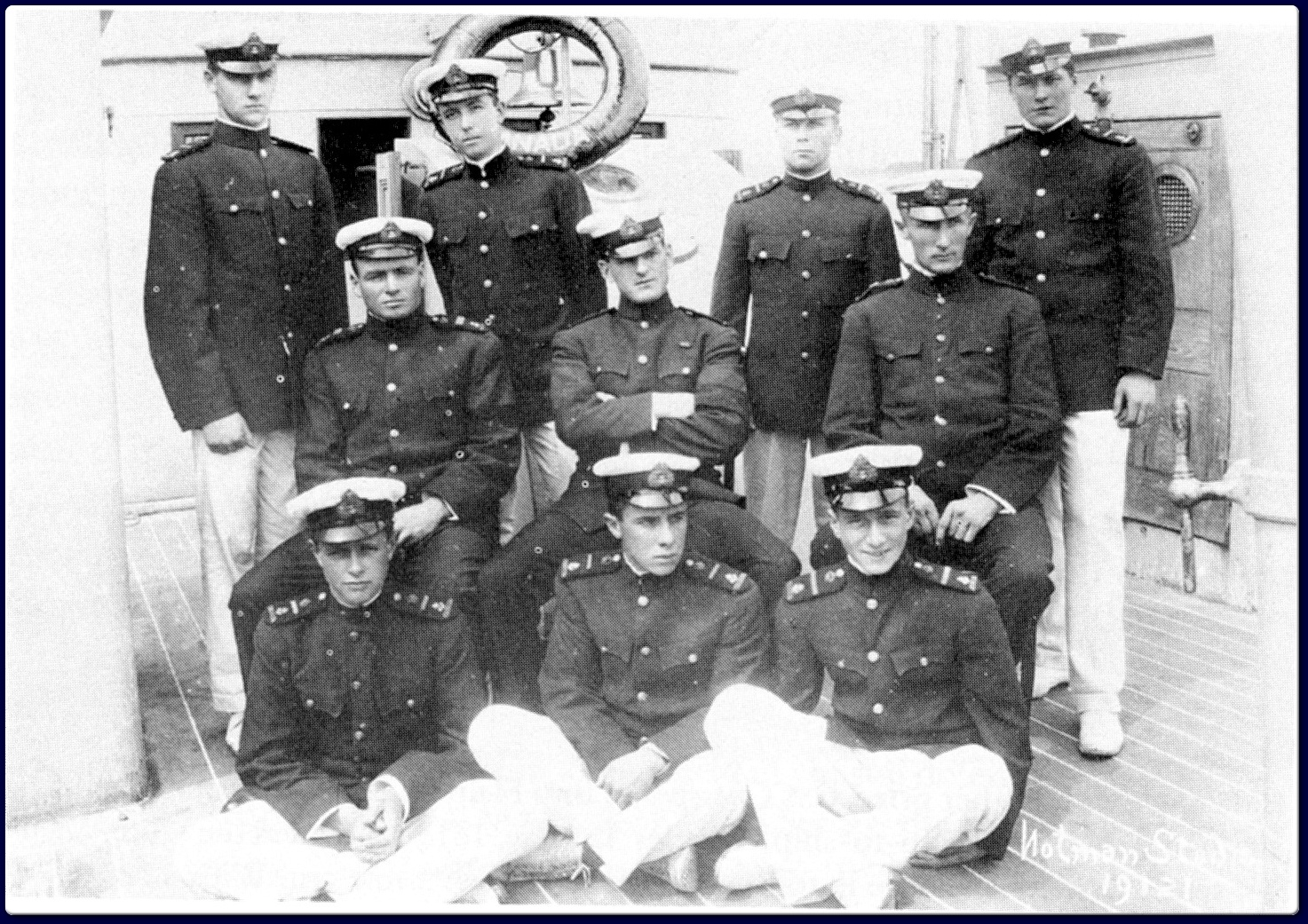
The original group of Canadian naval cadets serving in CGS Canada

As part of Prime Minister Sir Wilfrid Laurier's efforts to relieve Great Britain's overall commitment to North American defence in the wake of the Boer War, the Laurier government sought to develop the Fisheries Protection Service. As part of this effort, the government ordered a patrol ship in 1903–1904 for service on the East Coast of Canada. Canada was laid down by Vickers, Sons & Maxim at their shipyard in Barrow-in-Furness, England and launched on 14 June 1904. The ship was completed in July that year. Canada arrived at Quebec City on 29 September after undergoing a two-week inspection at Gaspé, Quebec. The ship then sailed for Halifax, Nova Scotia to install the Marconi wireless and more sea trials.

In January 1905, with naval militia recruits aboard, the ship was sent to the Caribbean Sea to join Royal Navy naval exercises there. Canada's participation in Royal Navy fleet exercises in 1905 is considered by some to be the beginnings of Canada's naval activity. The patrol vessel's planned Caribbean cruise in 1907 was cancelled due to personnel requirements. In 1908, the Canadian government sought to build a naval militia around Canada. This was soon put off as the department came under investigation. That year Canada took part in the Quebec Tercentenary.

In 1908, Canada became a training ship for officer cadets for the planned Canadian navy. Thus CGS Canada became Canada's first naval training ship and was, as stated by naval historians in Canada, the "Flagship of the embryonic Canadian Navy at the time, symbolic of the evolution of Canada from a dominion within the British Empire to a sovereign nation." In 1909, the Fisheries crew was removed from the ship and volunteers from the Royal Navy Reserve were brought aboard to provide a higher level of naval training. However, Canada continued to be used as a fisheries patrol vessel. In 1910, the Canadian navy was formed Canada escorted one of the nation's newly acquired cruisers, Niobe, into Halifax Harbour, with the new navy's cadets and the Director of the Naval Service, Rear Admiral Charles Kingsmill, aboard.

=== HMCS Canada ===
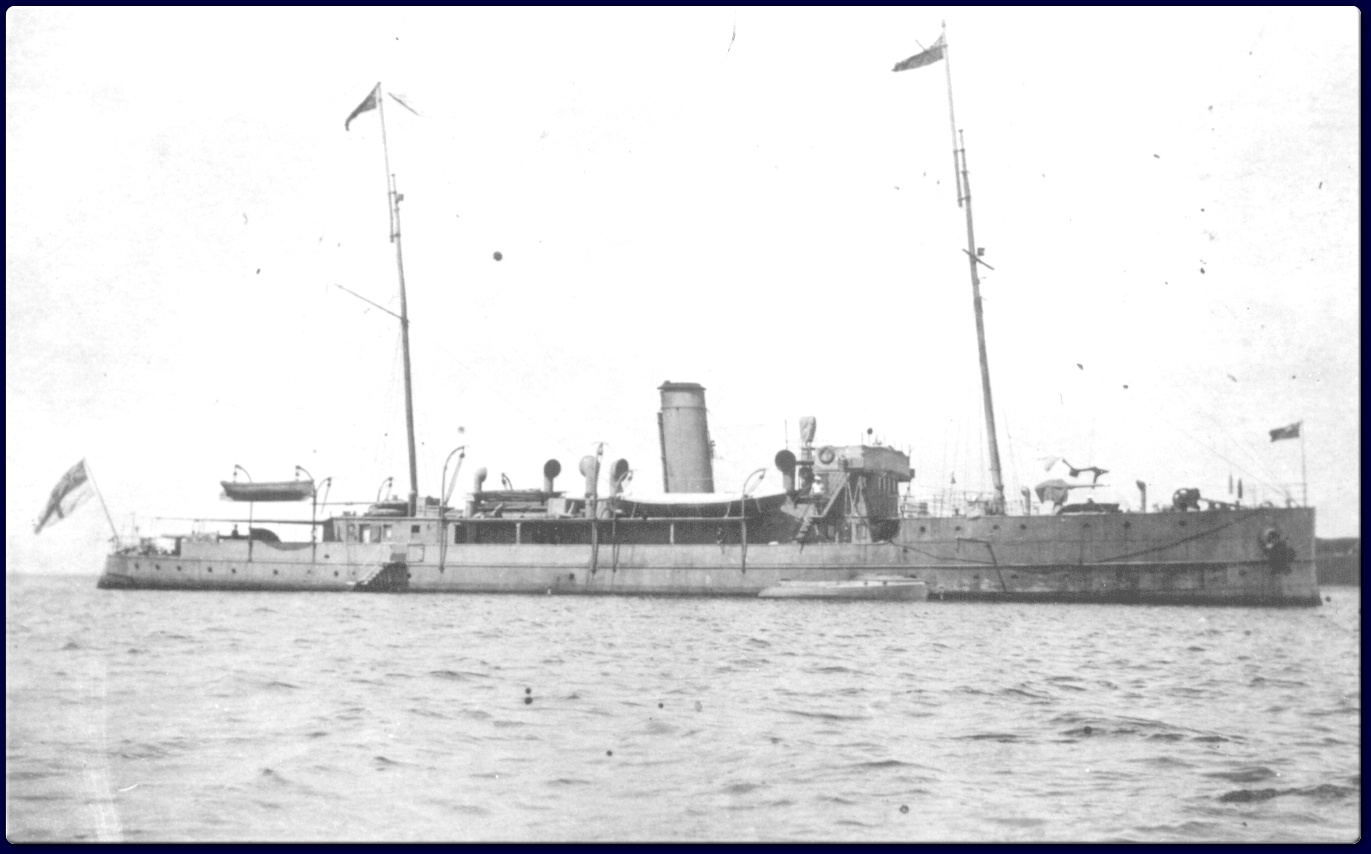
As HMCS Canada, during the First World War

After the First World War broke out in August 1914, Canada was transferred to the Royal Canadian Navy on 4 August. The ship then underwent a refit that rearmed her with more powerful weaponry and raised Canada's forecastle. The ship was commissioned as HMCS Canada on 25 January 1915 and served on the Atlantic coast as an anti-submarine patrol vessel while also serving as a training vessel, and performing fisheries patrol, minesweeping, and convoy escort duties. In June 1915, Canada escorted four H-class submarines from Quebec City to Newfoundland. In July 1915, Canada with HMCS Grilse, escorted two troopships through the Gulf of St. Lawrence. However, both ships needed long refits afterwards and did not return to service until September. By 1917, Canada's boilers were worn out and needed replacement. In 1917 the vessel became the Royal Canadian Navy's second flagship. On 6 December 1917 she was one of the ships anchored at HMC Dockyard in Halifax Harbour during the Halifax Explosion. She suffered minor damage and one crew member was seriously injured. The vessel was paid off (decommissioned) in November 1919 following the end of the war (Casserley 2005; Frey 2026). In 1918, Canada was among the Canadian naval vessels used to escort convoys from Quebec City through the Gulf of St. Lawrence. Following the end of the war, HMCS Canada was decommissioned in November 1919.

=== Queen of Nassau ===
In 1920, Canada was offered for sale at a price of $25,000. In 1921, Canada was offered to the Navy League of Canada for free, but the Navy League could not afford the insurance and other costs associated with the ship, and the offer was declined. After four years of neglect she was sold to Florida Inter Islands Steam Ship Company and then re-sold to Florida real estate entrepreneur Barron Gift Collier Sr. The ship was renamed Queen of Nassau and pressed into service passenger service between Miami, Florida and Nassau, Bahamas. Renamed SS Canada and later SS Queen of Nassau, the vessel was refurbished and placed into first-class passenger service between Miami, Florida, and Nassau, Bahamas. The venture proved commercially unsuccessful and Collier subsequently sold the vessel. In 1926 Mexican commercial interests acquired the ship and intended to place it in service between Tampico, Mexico, and New Orleans, Louisiana.

Prior to entering service on the Gulf route, Queen of Nassau departed Miami bound for Tampa, Florida, where it was scheduled to undergo final inspection. Approximately 80 kilometres (50 mi) south of Miami, the vessel's lower compartments began flooding. After the crew battled the incoming water for approximately ninety minutes, the captain ordered the ship abandoned. Queen of Nassau sank on 2 July 1926 in what is now the Florida Keys National Marine Sanctuary. Contemporary newspaper accounts reported that as the vessel settled, its bow rose clear of the water and a boiler explosion occurred before the ship disappeared beneath the surface. The site of the wreck is located 50 nautical miles (93 km; 58 mi) south of Miami and roughly 11 kilometres (7 mi) south of Lower Matecumbe Key.

== Wreck site ==
The wreck was located by technical divers in 2001 and rests in 235 feet (72 m) of water off of Islamorada, Florida. In March 2003, the site was the focus of an archaeological investigation by a National Oceanic and Atmospheric Administration (NOAA) team consisting of the Monitor National Marine Sanctuary, East Carolina University, National Undersea Research Center (NURC) at the University of North Carolina at Wilmington. The wreck of Canada was discovered in the Florida Keys National Marine Sanctuary and identified through a combination of historical research, site mapping, and archaeological investigation. NOAA surveys conducted between 2001 and 2005 produced baseline archaeological documentation and established the site's historical significance. In December 2025, the HMCS Canada Expedition conducted a comprehensive photogrammetric survey of the wreck in collaboration with NOAA's Office of National Marine Sanctuaries. The project produced the first complete three-dimensional photogrammetric model of the wreck site and provided updated archaeological documentation for comparison with earlier NOAA investigations. Researchers concluded that the wreck remains largely stable but continues to experience deterioration associated with corrosion, biological activity, fishing gear, and anchor impacts. Analysis of the 2025 survey also documented previously unrecorded fractures adjacent to the boiler room that may be consistent with the historically reported boiler explosion, although further investigation is required.

=== Ecology ===
Over nearly a century of submersion, the wreck has developed into a significant artificial reef ecosystem supporting corals, sponges, algae, fish, and other marine organisms. NOAA ecological surveys documented the wreck's importance as habitat for numerous reef species and as a long-term monitoring site for ecological change within the Florida Keys National Marine Sanctuary. The ecological assessment also documented the presence of invasive lionfish at the site, a species not reported during NOAA surveys conducted between 2001 and 2005. Researchers additionally recorded evidence of human impacts, including lost fishing gear and anchor-related damage. Archaeologists are working toward designating the wreck a U.S. National Historic Site because of the significance it holds in the evolution of Canada's military.

In December 2025, the wreck was surveyed by the Canadian-led HMCS Canada Expedition 2025, a Flag Expedition of both the Royal Canadian Geographical Society and The Explorers Club, in collaboration with the National Oceanic and Atmospheric Administration (NOAA). The expedition employed technical diving and 3D photogrammetry to create a high-resolution three-dimensional record of the wreck, collecting approximately 10,600 underwater photographs. Data generated during the expedition contributed to the preparation of two NOAA technical reports, one documenting the site's marine archaeology and the other its marine ecology. The resulting three-dimensional model was released for public research and educational use. The expedition was featured in a CBC News Network report by Brett Ruskin that was broadcast nationally in Canada on 2 July 2026, coinciding with the centenary of the ship's sinking.

== Bibliography ==
- Altmeir, Brenda; Bruckner, Andy (2026), Invasive Species, Ecological Context, and Human Impact Assessment: HMCS Canada/Queen of Nassau Deepwater Shipwreck Site, Islamorada, Florida., Florida Keys National Marine Sanctuary, Office of National Marine Sanctuaries, National Oceanic and Atmospheric Administration (NOAA)
- Armstrong, John Griffith (2002). The Halifax Explosion and the Royal Canadian Navy: Inquiry and Intrigue. Vancouver: UBC Press. ISBN 0-7748-0891-8.
- "Canada (1116870)". Miramar Ship Index.
- Casserley, Tane Renata (2005). CGS Canada: A Canadian Warship in the Florida Keys (Master's thesis). Greenville, North Carolina: East Carolina University.
- Frey, Joseph (2026). "HMCS Canada: From Warship to Reef". Alert Diver. ISSN 1084-2985.
- Gimblett, Richard H., ed. (2009). The Naval Service of Canada 1910–2010: The Centennial Story. Toronto: Dundurn Press. ISBN 978-1-55488-470-4.
- Hadley, Michael L. & Sarty, Roger (1991). Tin-Pots & Pirate Ships: Canadian Naval Forces & German Sea Raiders 1880–1918. Montreal & Kingston: McGill-Queen's University Press. ISBN 0-7735-0778-7.
- Jane's Fighting Ships of World War I. New York: Military Press. 1990 [1919]. ISBN 0-517-03375-5.
- Johnston, William; Rawling, William G.P.; Gimblett, Richard H. & MacFarlane, John (2010). The Seabound Coast: The Official History of the Royal Canadian Navy, 1867–1939. Vol. 1. Toronto: Dundurn Press. ISBN 978-1-55488-908-2.
- Lawrence, Matthew; Altmeier, Brenda; Casserley, Tane Renata (2026), HMCS Canada/Queen of Nassau Archaeological and Structural Assessment, Florida Keys National Marine Sanctuary, Office of National Marine Sanctuaries, National Oceanic and Atmospheric Administration (NOAA)
- Macpherson, Ken & Barrie, Ron (2002). The Ships of Canada's Naval Forces 1910–2002 (Third ed.). St. Catharines, Ontario: Vanwell Publishing. ISBN 1-55125-072-1.
- Maginley, Charles D. & Collin, Bernard (2001). The Ships of Canada's Marine Services. St. Catharines, Ontario: Vanwell Publishing Limited. ISBN 1-55125-070-5.
- Milner, Marc (2010). Canada's Navy: The First Century (Second ed.). Toronto: University of Toronto Press. ISBN 978-0-8020-9604-3.
- Tucker, Gilbert Norman (1962). The Naval Service of Canada, Its Official History – Volume 1: Origins and Early Years. Ottawa, Ontario: King's Printer. OCLC 840569671.
