= Canada-class submarine =

Cancelled Canadian nuclear attack class

Class overview
- Name: Canada class
- Operators: Canadian Forces
- Cost: Est. $8 billion CDN
- Planned: 10 (option for 2 more)
- Canceled: 10

The Canada-class submarine was a proposed class of ten nuclear-powered attack submarines to be built for Canadian Forces Maritime Command (today's Royal Canadian Navy) with an option for two more. Announced in 1987, the class was intended to provide Maritime Command with a method for monitoring Canada's Arctic Ocean area while establishing Canadian sovereignty in the area. The announcement suffered significant public and private criticism and the project was cancelled before any of the submarines could be built.

== Background ==
In March 1958, the Royal Canadian Navy began reviewing the possibility of acquiring nuclear-powered submarines under then-Chief of Naval Staff, Vice Admiral Harry DeWolf. This led to the creation of the Nuclear Submarine Survey Team (NSST), whose purpose was to investigate the feasibility of nuclear-powered submarines for Canada. The NSST delivered their final report in June 1959 recommending the American Skipjack class as the design of choice, and the acquisition of five of the submarines.

Under the new Chief of Naval Staff, Vice Admiral Herbert Rayner, the proposal was presented to the Cabinet of Canada suggesting the acquisition of 12 new submarines. However, due to cost, the Navy offered the cheaper alternative of conventionally-powered submarines. The Cabinet approved the initial proposal in January 1960, but deferred the decision on the type of submarine until March. By August 1960, the nuclear-powered submarine option was passed over for conventionally-powered subs and the Government ultimately chose the British diesel-electric Oberon class.

After the election of the new Liberal Government in 1963, the 1964 defence white paper stated that "careful study" was being given to the option of building two or three nuclear-powered submarines. However in the end, the option was not pursued.

In the early 1980s, Maritime Command (formerly the Royal Canadian Navy) began a program to replace the aging Oberons. Dubbed the Canadian Submarine Acquisition Program (CASAP), they recommended a building program of 4 to 12 submarines with under-ice capability. The report was presented to the Minister of National Defence, Erik Nielsen, in 1985 with plans for conventionally-powered submarines only. Nielsen requested more information on the possibility of nuclear-powered submarines. The study ordered by Nielsen, named the Nuclear Submarine Option Study (NSOS), claimed that British or French designs could be built in Canada for approximately C$5 billion. This study would shape the policy promoted in the 1987 White Paper on Defence.

== Proposal and design ==
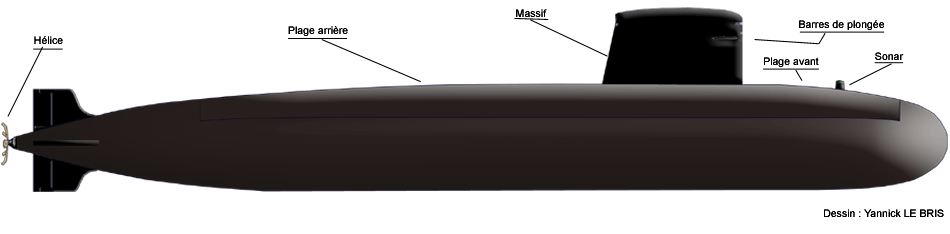
The Rubis-class design

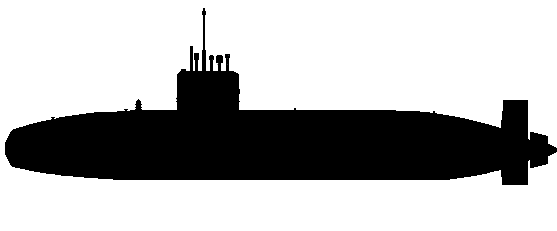
A silhouette of the Trafalgar class

On 6 June 1987, the Canadian White Paper on Defence was tabled in the House of Commons. The White Paper recommended the building of 10 to 12 nuclear-powered submarines, to be stationed on patrol routes in the Northeast Pacific, Arctic and Northwest Atlantic Oceans. Due to their greater speed, range, and ability to operate underneath the Arctic ice, nuclear submarines were preferred. The goal was to build up a three-ocean navy, assert Canadian sovereignty over Arctic waters, and enhance contributions to NATO operations. The demand for a vessel that could monitor the Arctic was born out of the cruise of the American icebreaker USCGC Polar Sea in 1985 through the Arctic, of which part took it through Canadian territorial waters. The first of the submarines would be expected to enter service in 1996.

The intent was to build the submarines in Canada to an existing NATO design. CASAP and NSOS were merged to form a group to select the submarine design. The group developed the Statement of Requirement (SOR) needed for the evaluation of designs. The SOR called for a safe, reliable design that had modern anti-submarine warfare and under-ice capability, being capable of breaking through ice up to 1 metre (3.3 ft) thick. The SOR placed less emphasis on hydrodynamic performances or anti-ship and inshore operational capabilities. They also needed to have a low noise and radiation signatures, the most modern passive sonars and command, control and communications systems. The SOR also stated that the submarine have six torpedo tubes and be able to fire the Mark 48 torpedo.

By 1988 Maritime Command was looking at purchasing the design of either the French Rubis class or the British Trafalgar class. However, neither design met the SOR, with the Rubis class being noisy underwater and slow and the Trafalgar class having only five torpedo tubes and requiring US permission to transfer the nuclear propulsion technology. However, the French brought back a revision to their design, added an "ice pick" so the submarine could operate under ice and were developing a modification for their torpedo tubes which were too short to use the Mark 48 torpedoes. The British Trafalgar design team did not take Canada's plan seriously and the French Rubis design also came with the caveat that the first 4–5 submarines would have to be built in France.

In fall 1987, the British and French put their respective designs on display, with HMS Torbay and the French submarine Saphir sailing to Halifax, Nova Scotia for close inspection. As the program advanced, the Department of National Defence encouraged the bidding companies to form consortiums in order to please the politicians. Opposition however, also began to strengthen against the program.

== Opposition to program ==
=== Opposition at home ===
The proposed nuclear attack submarines were not received well by some politicians. As early as 1985, Ministers Joe Clark and Michael Wilson were against the project, Clark because Canadian nuclear submarines would upset the balance of power with the Warsaw Pact and Wilson because of the cost. The Treasury Board objected to the program, claiming that the project was run poorly with project costs not developed accurately, especially those tied to infrastructure needs. Members of the opposition focused on the estimated C$8 billion cost of the project, pointing out the steadily increasing size of the federal deficit and debt. The announcement came slightly more than a year after the Chernobyl disaster, prompting fears of similar nuclear incidents even though no submarine accidents involving reactors had occurred in the then three decades of NATO nuclear submarine use.

=== American opposition ===
The United States objected to the RCN having SSNs as part of its fleet, fearing a significant impact to its own submarine operations in North American waters and possible conflict over access to the Northwest Passage. In order to prevent this, the United States exercised its rights under two previously signed treaties. Under the 1958 US–UK Mutual Defence Agreement, the US had the right to block the sale of submarine nuclear reactors by the United Kingdom to any third party (i.e. Canada), and under a 1959 agreement between the US and Canada the US had the right to block the purchase of submarine nuclear reactors by Canada from any third party (i.e. the United Kingdom or France). Attempts to negotiate with the United States were initially unsuccessful. Canadian Defence Minister Perrin Beatty was "told in no uncertain terms by the U.S. Defense Department and submarine service officials that a Canadian nuclear submarine program was unnecessary and even unwelcome" during a 1987 trip, to secure the transfer of American nuclear technology from Britain to Canada. Although by October 1987, the US gave preliminary approval to the British to share data about the Trafalgar-class propulsion plant. President Reagan reaffirmed his support during his meeting with Prime Minister Mulroney in May 1988. Where the Canadian government was awaiting for final congress approval, before announcing any decision in regards to what submarine it would have purchased.

== Cancellation ==
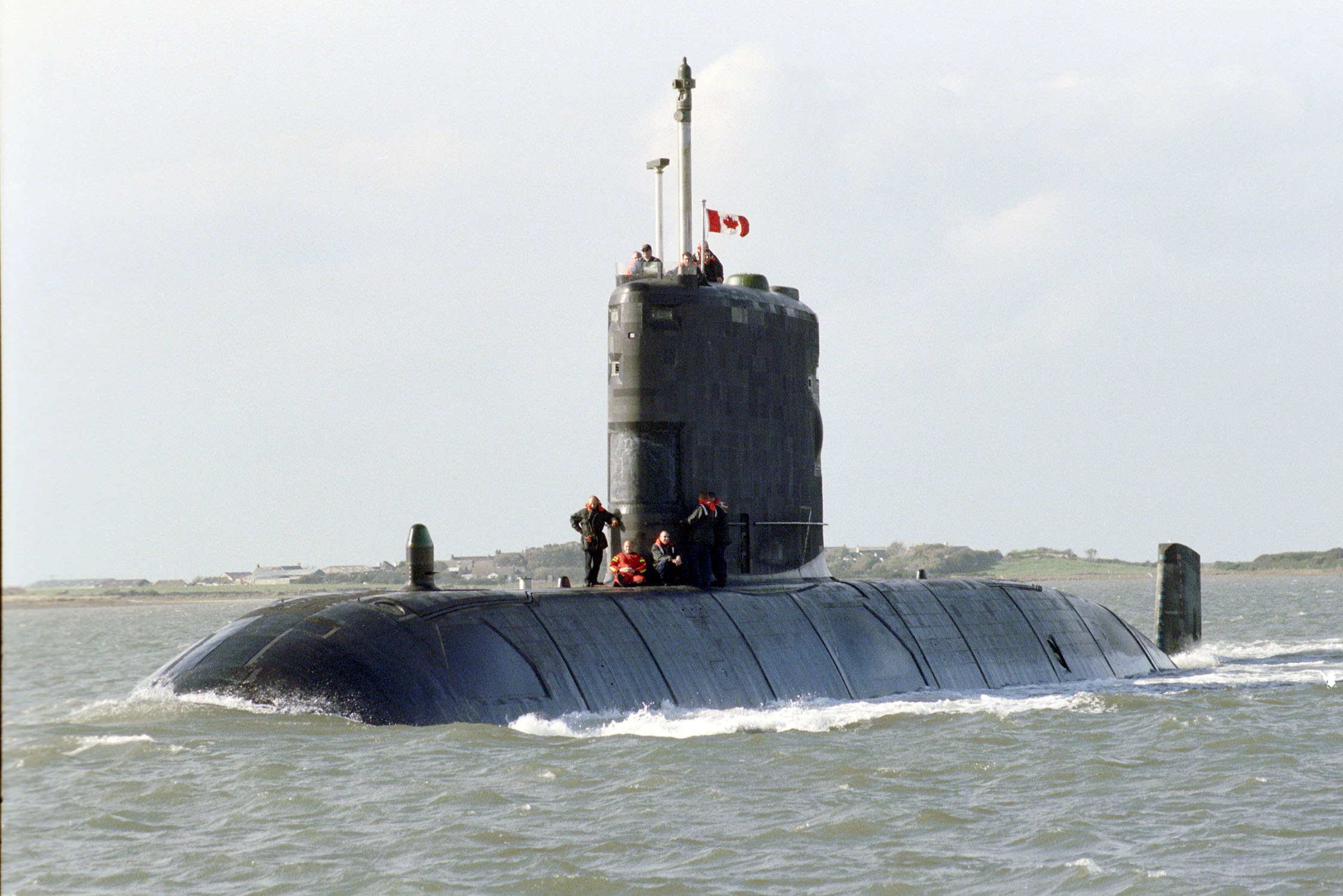
HMCS Windsor, one of the Upholders later acquired to replace the Oberons

The Conservative government sought re-election 1988, winning in November. However, public opinion had turned against the program and Prime Minister Brian Mulroney placed the submarines behind other costly government priorities. Government support of the project was seen to be flagging when Perrin Beatty was moved to another Cabinet position and replaced by Bill McKnight as Minister of Defence. Due to internal as well as external opposition to the acquisition of nuclear-powered submarines, a rising federal debt, and with the lessening of tensions between NATO and the Warsaw Pact, the submarines were officially cancelled as part of the federal budget released in April 1989.

The cancellation had a two-fold effect. The first was the loss of the submarines, which were needed to replace the aging Oberons. The second was the loss of the Batch 3 Halifax-class frigates, which had been sacrificed in order to pay for the submarines. The Oberons were not replaced until the purchase of the Upholder-class submarines in 1995, a conventionally-powered British design.

== Naming ==
Construction of the proposed nuclear-powered submarines was never authorized, and as a result no official names or hull numbers were ever assigned to individual submarines. Maritime Command's Ships' Names Committee proposed that the submarines be named after the provinces (and possibly territories) of Canada, and be named in the order that they joined Canada or were created. The Ships' Names Committee proposed the name "Canada class" (favouring no one province or territory), but this name violated existing procedures for ship class names. Because of the ambiguity of the class name, these subs are sometimes referred to as "Province-class" submarines, based on the proposed names (cf. the Maritime Command's Halifax-class frigates originally referred to as City class, before final names were assigned). At the time of the proposal two Maritime Command ships were in service with such names, HMCS Saskatchewan and HMCS Yukon (named not after the provinces, but after the Saskatchewan and Yukon rivers), but were to be retired before the scheduled commissioning of the first of the submarines.

== See also ==
- National Shipbuilding Procurement Strategy
