= Ralph Hennessy =

Royal Canadian Navy officer

- Born: 4 September 1918; Edinburgh, Scotland
- Died: 13 June 2014 (aged 95) Ottawa, Ontario
- Allegiance: Canada
- Branch: Royal Canadian Navy
- Service years: 1935–1970
- Rank: Vice-Admiral
- Commands: HMCS Assiniboine; HMCS Gatineau; HMCS Micmac; Atlantic Coast; Royal Canadian Navy
- Conflicts: Second World War
- Awards: Distinguished Service Cross; Canadian Forces' Decoration

Vice Admiral Ralph Lucien Hennessy DSC, CD (4 September 1918 – 13 June 2014) was a senior officer in the Royal Canadian Navy.

== Naval career ==
Hennessy joined the Royal Canadian Navy as a cadet in 1935. He served in the Second World War in command of the destroyers HMCS Assiniboine, HMCS Gatineau, and HMCS Micmac. He went on to be Deputy Chief of Naval Personnel in 1960, Flag Officer Atlantic Coast in 1963 and Chair of Military Manpower in 1964. His last role was as Principal Naval Adviser, from 1966 to 1968.

== Awards and decorations ==
Hennessy's personal awards and decorations include the following:

Ribbon	Description	Notes
	Distinguished Service Cross (DSC)	Citation for Distinguished Service Cross (DSC)
	1939–1945 Star	WWII 1939–1945
	Atlantic Star	WWII 1939–1945 with France & Germany Clasp
	Defence Medal (United Kingdom)	WWII 1939–1945
	Canadian Volunteer Service Medal	WWII 1939–1945 with Overseas Service bar
	War Medal 1939–1945	WWII 1939–1945
	Queen Elizabeth II Coronation Medal	Decoration awarded in 1952
	Canadian Centennial Medal	Decoration awarded in 1967
	Queen Elizabeth II Silver Jubilee Medal	Decoration awarded in 1977; Canadian version
	125th Anniversary of the Confederation of Canada Medal	Decoration awarded in 1992
	Canadian Forces' Decoration (CD)	with two Clasp for 32 years of services; George VI version
	Commissionaires Long Service Medal	with three Clasp for 27 years of services

Military offices
Preceded by Kenneth Dyer	Principal Naval Adviser; 1966–1968	Succeeded by William Landymore (as Commander of Maritime Command)
