= Andrew Collier =

Andrew Collier may refer to:

- Andrew Collier (admiral)
- Andrew Collier (philosopher)
