= William Landymore =

Canadian naval Flag officer and opponent of unification

William Moss Landymore
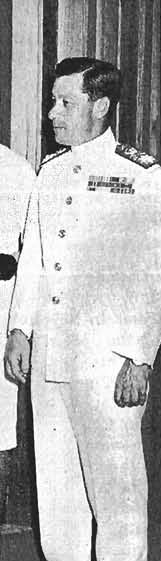
- Landymore in 1964
- Born: 31 July 1916; Brantford, Ontario
- Died: 27 November 2008 (aged 92) Halifax, Nova Scotia
- Allegiance: Canada
- Branch: Royal Canadian Navy
- Service years: 1936–1967
- Rank: Rear-Admiral
- Conflicts: Second World War: Battle of the Atlantic; Battle of Okinawa; Korean War
- Awards: MID (3); OBE; Canadian Forces' Decoration (CD) with two bars; Naval General Service Medal (GVI) with BAR Palestine 1939/45 Star; Atlantic Star; Pacific Star; Defence Medal CVSM and Clasp - 1939/1945 War Medal with MID; Canadian Korean Medal with MID; United Nations Korea EIIR Coronation - CD (GVI) and two Bars

Rear-Admiral William Moss Landymore, OBE, CD (31 July 1916 – 27 November 2008) was a Canadian naval officer. Born in Brantford, Ontario, Landymore joined the Royal Canadian Navy in 1936, but spent much of early career training with the Royal Navy. During World War II, Landymore returned to the Royal Canadian Navy and served aboard destroyers in the Battle of the Atlantic, surviving two sinkings. By the end of the war Landymore had taken a series of positions in Ottawa before returning to destroyer command during the Korean War. He was promoted through the ranks eventually becoming the first Commander of Maritime Command. Landymore became embroiled in a public feud with the Minister of National Defence following the Unification of the Canadian Armed Forces and resigned as a result. He died at Halifax, Nova Scotia.

== Early career ==
Landymore joined the Royal Canadian Navy on 28 August 1934 where he commenced studies at the Royal Military College of Canada as cadet #2399. As a cadet, Landymore served aboard the Royal Navy training cruiser HMS Frobisher before being sent to the light cruiser HMS Emerald. During his time with the Royal Navy he was also appointed to HMS Glasgow, HMS Victory and HMS Windsor. He was commissioned into the Royal Canadian Navy as a midshipman on 1 May 1937 and promoted to acting sub-lieutenant on 1 March 1939.

== Second World War ==
Landymore was posted to the C-class destroyer HMCS Fraser in 1940 and survived her sinking after she collided with the cruiser HMS Calcutta in the Gironde estuary. He was promoted to lieutenant on 1 November 1940 and served aboard the River-class destroyer HMCS Margaree and survived her sinking. Landymore served on convoy escort missions in the Atlantic, Arctic, and Pacific Oceans, in the Second World War. In 1942, he specialized in gunnery, taking the RN Long Gunnery course at HMS Excellent. In 1943, Landymore was posted to HMS Grenville. He was promoted to acting lieutenant commander on 5 June 1944. He was transferred to Naval Service Headquarters (NSHQ) in Ottawa in 1944, as Director of Warfare and Training. Later in 1944, he returned to sea in the cruiser HMCS Uganda. In 1945, he returned to NSHQ as Staff Gunnery Officer.

== Cold War ==
Landymore was promoted to the substantive rank of lieutenant-commander on 1 May 1947 and served as gunnery officer aboard HMCS Uganda, where he earned a Mention in Despatches (MID). He was then stationed as staff gunnery officer at Naval Service Headquarters in Ottawa. He was promoted to commander on 1 July 1949 and given command of the Tribal-class destroyer destroyer HMCS Iroquois, where he was awarded a second mention-in-despatches. He was promoted to acting captain on 14 June 1952. He commanded Iroquois for the duration of the Korean War from 21 October 1951 to 31 October 1953.

Landymore was promoted to the substantive rank of captain on 1 January 1953, and was posted to a variety of stations throughout the remainder of the 1950s, including the position of Commander Canadian Destroyers Far East when he was appointed an Officer of the Most Excellent Order of the British Empire (OBE). In 1958 Landymore was given command of the light aircraft carrier HMCS Bonaventure, the flagship of the east coast fleet.

He was promoted to commodore on 1 October 1959 and served as chief of staff to the Flag Officer Atlantic Coast, until 1962. He was promoted to rear-admiral on 1 November 1962 and served as Flag Officer Pacific Coast, from 1962 to 1964 and then as Flag Officer Atlantic Coast from 1964 to 1966. In January 1966 Landymore was appointed the first Commander of Maritime Command, and thus commander of all naval forces, as the position of Chief of the Naval Staff had been abolished in 1964.

Landymore became embroiled in "a bitter public disagreement" with the Minister of National Defence over the unification of the Royal Canadian Navy, Canadian Army, and Royal Canadian Air Force, to form the Canadian Armed Forces, and resigned from the RCN on 19 July 1966 (effective 5 April 1967).

He died at Halifax, Nova Scotia in 2008.

Bruce Forsyth writes Robert Caldwell wrote in his 2006 book The Admirals: Canada's Senior Naval Leadership in the Twentieth Century, that Landymore was "popular, admired by all ranks, and is remembered as being a forthright, four-square, hands-on commander and staff officer."

== Honours ==
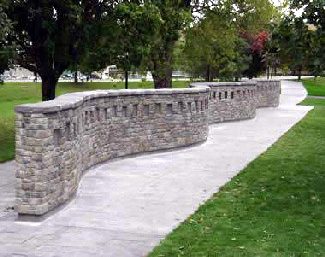
Wall of Honour, Royal Military College of Canada

He was awarded an MID in the London Gazette of 1 January 1946 and Canada Gazette of 5 January, in recognition of his service to Uganda. He was awarded the Naval General Service Medal with Palestine bar for his service to Emerald for training during his Palestine campaign service in 1937. He was appointed an OBE and an MID for his Korean War service as commanding officer of Iroquois. In retirement, as chairman of the Board of Grace Hospital Halifax, Nova Scotia he was awarded the Salvation Army Cross of the Order of Distinguished Auxiliary Service. He is a 2010 induction to the Wall of Honour at the Royal Military College of Canada.

== Awards and decorations ==
Landymore's personal awards and decorations include the following:

Ribbon	Description	Notes
	Order of the British Empire (OBE)	Citation for Order of the British Empire (OBE)
	Naval General Service Medal (1915)	with Palestine 1936–39 Clasp; For service during the uprising by Palestinian Arabs
	1939–1945 Star	WWII 1939-1945
	Atlantic Star	WWII 1939-1945
	Pacific Star	WWII 1939-1945
	Defence Medal (United Kingdom)	WWII 1939-1945
	Canadian Volunteer Service Medal	WWII 1939–1945 with Overseas Service bar
	War Medal 1939–1945 with Mentioned in dispatches	WWII 1939-1945
	Korea Medal with Mentioned in dispatches	1950-1953
	Canadian Volunteer Service Medal for Korea	
	United Nations Service Medal Korea	1950-1954
	Queen Elizabeth II Coronation Medal	Decoration awarded in 1952
	Canadian Forces' Decoration (CD)	with two Clasp for 32 years of services

Military offices
Preceded by Ralph Hennessy (as Principal Naval Adviser)	Commander Maritime Command; 1966	Succeeded by John O'Brien
