= Douglas Boyle =

Royal Canadian Navy officer (1923–2001)

- Born: 29 November 1923; Revelstoke, British Columbia
- Died: 23 July 2001 (aged 77); Ottawa, Ontario
- Military career
- Allegiance: Canada
- Branch: Royal Canadian Navy; Canadian Forces
- Service years: 1939–1977
- Rank: Vice-Admiral
- Commands: HMCS Athabaskan; HMCS Saguenay; 4th Canadian Escort Squadron; Standing Naval Force Atlantic; Maritime Command
- Conflicts: Second World War
- Awards: Order of Military Merit; Canadian Forces' Decoration

Vice Admiral Douglas Seaman Boyle CMM, CD (29 November 1923 – 23 July 2001) was a Canadian Forces officer who served as Commander of Maritime Command from 21 August 1973 to 14 June 1977.

== Career ==
Boyle joined the Royal Canadian Navy in 1939 and trained at the Royal Naval College, Dartmouth before serving in the cruiser HMS Diomede and the destroyers HMS Wolsey, HMCS Iroquois and HMCS Chaudiere during the Second World War. He became Commanding Officer of the destroyer HMCS Athabaskan in 1957, Commanding Officer of the destroyer HMCS Saguenay in 1959 and Commander of the 4th Canadian Escort Squadron in 1962. He went on to be Director Naval Training at the National Defence Headquarters in 1964, Director Senior Appointments (Navy) in 1964 and Director General Postings & Careers in 1966. After that he became Commander NATO Standing Naval Force Atlantic in 1970, Director General Plans Requirements and Production in 1971 and Chief of Personnel for the Canadian Armed Forces in 1972. His last appointment was as Commander Maritime Command in 1973, in which role he complained about the gap between commitments and capability at Maritime Command, before retiring in 1977.

== Awards and decorations ==
Boyle's personal awards and decorations include the following:

Ribbon	Description	Notes
	Order of Military Merit (CMM)	Appointed Commander (CMM) on 14 June 1976
	1939–1945 Star	WWII 1939-1945
	Atlantic Star	WWII 1939–1945 with France & Germany Clasp
	Defence Medal (United Kingdom)	WWII 1939-1945
	Canadian Volunteer Service Medal	WWII 1939–1945 with Overseas Service bar
	War Medal 1939–1945 with Mentioned in dispatches	WWII 1939-1945
	Queen Elizabeth II Coronation Medal	Decoration awarded in 1952
	Canadian Centennial Medal	Decoration awarded in 1967
	Canadian Forces' Decoration (CD)	with two Clasp for 32 years of services

Military offices
Preceded by Robert Timbrell	Commander Maritime Command; 1973–1977	Succeeded by Andrew Collier
