= Admiral Collier =

Admiral Collier may refer to:

- Andrew Collier (admiral) (1924–1987), Canadian Forces Maritime Command vice admiral
- Francis Augustus Collier (1786–1849), British Royal Navy rear admiral
- George Collier (1732–1795), British Royal Navy vice admiral
