= John Rogers Anderson =

Canadian diplomat, military officer and civil servant (born 1941)

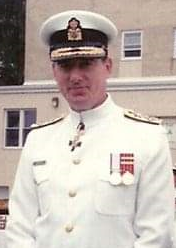
- Born: September 9, 1941 (age 85); Trail, British Columbia
- Military career
- Allegiance: Canada
- Branch: Royal Canadian Navy; Canadian Forces Maritime Command
- Service years: 1959–1993
- Rank: Admiral
- Commands: HMCS Restigouche; Naval Officers' Training Centre at CFB Esquimalt; First Canadian Destroyer Squadron in Halifax NS; Chief of the Defence Staff
- Awards: Commander of the Order of Military Merit; Canadian Forces' Decoration
- Other work: Canada’s Ambassador and Permanent Representative to the North Atlantic Treaty Organization

Admiral John Rogers Anderson, CMM CD (born 9 September 1941) is a retired Canadian Forces officer, former Canadian diplomat and civil servant.

== Early life and career ==
Anderson was born in British Columbia and attended the University of British Columbia. After graduating with a BSc in 1959, he joined the Royal Canadian Navy and thereafter gradually progressed through the commissioned officer ranks.

== Military career ==
From 1963 to 1966 he completed the Long Operations Course at HMCS Stadacona, then served in the frigates HMCS Saskatchewan and HMCS St. Croix followed by a staff posting to Royal Roads Military College.

He was appointed to the aircraft carrier HMCS Bonaventure in 1968.

In 1970, he joined the CCS 280 Programming Team as a Programmer at Canadian Forces Headquarters (CFHQ) in Ottawa.

In 1974, Anderson became executive officer in the destroyer HMCS Iroquois. In 1975, he studied at the Canadian Forces Command and Staff College in Toronto. He became commanding officer of the frigate HMCS Restigouche in 1978; commanding officer of the Naval Officers' Training Centre at CFB Esquimalt in 1980; and commander of the First Canadian Destroyer Squadron in 1982.

Subsequent appointments included Director Maritime Requirements (Sea) at the National Defence Headquarters in 1983; Director General of Maritime Doctrine and Operations in 1986; and Chief of the Canadian Nuclear Submarine Acquisition Project in 1987. Thereafter he became Chief of Maritime Doctrine and Operations in 1989; Commander Maritime Command in 1991; and Vice Chief of the Defence Staff in 1992.

Promoted to full Admiral in 1993, he briefly served as Chief of Defence Staff of the Canadian Forces before retiring at the end of the year. His last appointment was as Canada's Ambassador and Permanent Representative to the North Atlantic Treaty Organization in Brussels, Belgium in 1994.

He was made a Commander of the Order of Military Merit in 1989.

== Awards and decorations ==
Anderson's personal awards and decorations include the following:

Ribbon	Description	Notes
	Order of Military Merit (CMM)	Appointed Commander (CMM) on 10 July 1989
	Special Service Medal	with NATO-OTAN Clasp
	125th Anniversary of the Confederation of Canada Medal	1992
	Canadian Forces' Decoration (CD)	with two Clasp for 32 years of service

Military offices
Preceded by R.E.D. George	Commander Maritime Command; 1991–1992	Succeeded by P.W. Cairns
Preceded by F.R. Sutherland	Vice Chief of the Defence Staff; 1992–1993	Succeeded by P.J. O'Donnell
Preceded by A.J.G.D. de Chastelain	Chief of the Defence Staff; 1993	Succeeded by A.J.G.D. de Chastelain
Diplomatic posts
Preceded by James K. Bartleman	Ambassador and Permanent Representative to the North Atlantic Council; 1994–1997	Succeeded by David Wright
