= Commodore Porter =

Commodore Porter may refer to:

- David Porter (naval officer) (1780–1843), U.S. Navy commodore
- William D. Porter (1808–1864), U.S. Navy commodore

== See also ==
- David Dixon Porter (1813–1891), U.S. Navy admiral
- Henry Porter (Canadian admiral) (1922–2016), Royal Canadian Navy vice admiral
