= Robert Timbrell =

Canadian Navy admiral (1920–2006)

- Born: February 1, 1920; Tavistock, Devon, England
- Died: April 11, 2006 (aged 86); Chester, Nova Scotia, Canada
- Military career
- Allegiance: Canada
- Branch: Royal Canadian Navy; Canadian Forces
- Rank: Rear Admiral
- Conflicts: Second World War; *Operation Dynamo; *Battle of the Atlantic
- Awards: Order of Military Merit; Distinguished Service Cross; Canadian Forces' Decoration

Rear Admiral Robert Walter Timbrell, CMM, DSC, CD, Royal Canadian Navy (February 1, 1920 – April 11, 2006) was the first Canadian to be decorated with the Distinguished Service Cross during the Second World War. This followed his part in Operation Dynamo where he was personally responsible for the evacuation of 900 troops from the beaches of Dunkirk.

Later in the war he served on destroyers escorting convoys across the North Atlantic, becoming second in command and then serving on the staff of escort group commanders.

His post-war career saw him command a variety of vessels including the aircraft carrier HMCS Bonaventure as well as several staff roles. He ultimately became head of Canada's naval forces but he was unhappy with the merger of the Canadian Army, Royal Canadian Navy and the Royal Canadian Air Force into the unified Canadian Forces. Following conflicts with the Chief of the Defence Staff, he retired in 1973.

== Early life ==
Born in Tavistock, Devon he was the son of a British railway engineer who found work in Canada. His early schooling was at West Vancouver High School in British Columbia, but at 15 he joined the River Mersey-based training ship HMS Conway as a cadet. Timbrell graduated from the Royal Military College of Canada in 1937, student# RCNSE54.

== Naval career ==
From 1937 served as a midshipman in the RCN. There was then no naval training in Canada itself, so he was posted to the Royal Navy ships HMS Erebus, HMS Vindictive, HMS Barham, HMS Warspite, and HMS Hood in the Mediterranean and North Atlantic.

=== Dunkirk ===
Timbrell was promoted sub-lieutenant and posted to the Royal Naval gunnery school at Whale Island, Portsmouth. He was still just 20 years old, when in May 1940 he was among 20 other junior officers who were ordered to take command of small boats to assist in the evacuation from Dunkirk.

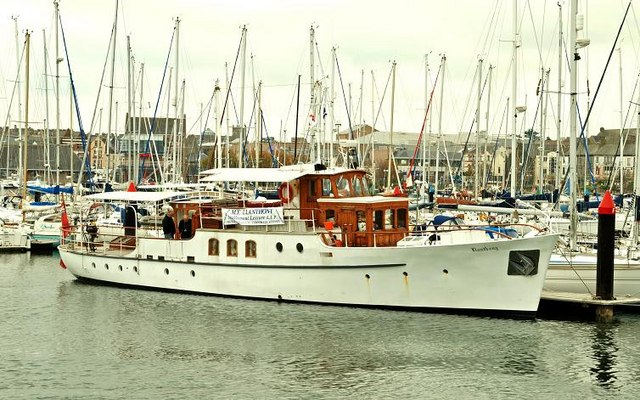
MY Llanthony at Bangor, Northern Ireland, on 4 November 2008

He was sent to Ramsgate and placed in command of the 1934 Camper and Nicholsons motor yacht Llanthony, which belonged to the former Member of Parliament Colonel Lionel Beaumont Thomas MC. Timbrell was assigned a crew consisting of a Royal Navy petty officer, two London Transport (LT) bus mechanics and six woodsmen from Newfoundland. The only equipment that was issued was a First World War revolver, an uncorrected magnetic compass and a chart of the (known) minefields. However, Llanthony did carry two tenders, which would later allow them to take 16 men at a time off the beaches.

After fuelling and loading several barrels of fresh water they set off across the English Channel for Dunkirk. Before arriving at the beaches they met a broken down Thames pleasure steamer, crowded with evacuated troops which they immediately towed back to Ramsgate. Setting out once more for the evacuation beaches, this time they reached Dunkirk and started on the evacuation. Then, as Timbrell told CBC in 1980, "On the third or fourth trip we got bombed. We were hit on the fo'csle. I lost about five of the crew and both my anchors snapped. The fuel pipes were severed so both engines died. We drifted up on the beach."

He had succeeded in digging out the propellers and rudder from the sand when a Guards sergeant appeared with eight guardsmen. The sergeant went back into Dunkirk and commandeered a Bren Gun Carrier, this was driven into the sea until its engine stopped, and then used as an anchor for Llanthony. The two LT mechanics then managed to repair and restart the engines and she could be winched back into the water. A metal plate was fixed over the bomb damage and she returned to Kent with another load of soldiers.

Back in Ramsgate, in Timbrell's own words, "By then I was an old hand, so I was given four trawlers to add to my fleet. They had come down from Scotland and their old skippers had 20 years' experience – more sea time than I will ever get in my life."

The Guards sergeant, and a few of his men, elected to stay with Llanthony, and had gathered together what they could find by way of weaponry, including Bren guns and anti-tank weapons. On the next trip, one of the trawlers hit a mine and was blown to pieces, with no survivors. However the replacement crew of Llanthony were able to drive off air attacks with the weaponry they had gathered, and gave a marauding German E-boat something of a surprise when it attempted to attack them, only to be driven off.

On his final trip to Dunkirk, by which time German troops were already entering the town, he was met on the beach by a drunken British soldier who insisted on paying for his passage home with a case of looted brandy, and who then spent the journey asleep in the wheelhouse of the yacht. Timbrell then returned to Portsmouth in the yacht, by now a shadow of its former elegant self. The funnels riddled with bullet holes, the boats smashed and hull dirty and stained. Disembarking at Portsmouth dockyard, he stopped a civilian bus just outside the gates. Having looked at the dishevelled bunch in front of him, still with their weapons (and brandy), the bus conductor asked, "Are you just back from Dunkirk, sir?" The civilian passengers were still on board as the bus took the military personnel to Whale Island.

Llanthony itself had brought back 280 men, and with the trawlers under his command the total for which Timbrell was responsible was 900 evacuated. Timbrell's DSC was gazetted on 16 August 1940 and the investiture was made by King George VI himself, on September 3, 1940.

=== Remaining war service ===
Following his Dunkirk experiences he served on HMCS Margaree which was sunk in heavy weather following a collision with a freighter she was escorting. Timbrell survived after spending several hours in a life raft with 20 others in the rough seas of the North Atlantic.

He then served on the destroyers HMCS Annapolis, HMCS Ottawa, HMCS Qu'Appelle, HMCS Micmac as First Lieutenant and then as a staff officer to escort-group commanders.

He was twice mentioned in dispatches, firstly for his part in the destruction of the German submarine U-621 in the Bay of Biscay on August 18, 1944, and then for the sinking of U-984 two days later.

As part of the small corps of professional Canadian naval officers, Timbrell had an important role to play as the RCN expanded from a pre-war strength of just 3,700 to 96,000.

=== Post-war ===
In 1946 he married Patricia Jones. He then served successively as commanding officer of the frigate HMCS Swansea, and the light cruiser HMCS Ontario. In the latter command he was responsible for transporting Princess Elizabeth and Prince Philip from Prince Edward Island to Sydney, Nova Scotia.

Following these sea commands, he was appointed as vice-commandant of Royal Roads Military College and then attended a staff course at the Royal Naval College, Greenwich. This in turn was followed by command of the brand new destroyer HMCS St. Laurent.

After two years of command, he was appointed as executive officer of the naval base HMCS Shearwater and then had three years on the staff of Supreme Allied Commander Atlantic in Norfolk, Virginia.

He then returned to sea in command of HMCS Bonaventure ferrying Canadian troops to Cyprus in the mid 1960s. Again sea command was followed by staff appointments, this time at Training Command in Winnipeg, then working with General Jean Allard to reduce Canadian military commitments overseas and then two years on the Canadian Defence Liaison Staff in Washington DC, which also carried diplomatic rank as military attaché at the Canadian Embassy there. He then returned to Canada, going to Halifax, Nova Scotia to serve as Commander Maritime Command in the unified Canadian Forces. Never happy having been forced into the green uniform of the Canadian Forces, he clashed with the Chief of the Defence Staff and retired in 1973 as a rear admiral and was honoured as a Commander of the Order of Military Merit.

== Retirement ==
Following his retirement Timbrell became president of the Dominion Marine Association an organisation related to shipping on the Great Lakes and Saint Lawrence Seaway. He held this position until 1985, when he moved from Ottawa to Chester Basin, Nova Scotia.

He made a final return to Dunkirk in May 2000, as part of the 60th anniversary celebrations. Llanthony had been restored for the occasion, but in the event bad weather meant he could not complete the crossing on his original vessel, so he travelled on the British destroyer, HMS Somerset.

He died on April 11, 2006, and is survived by his widow (Patricia Timbrell née Jones, after nearly 60 years of marriage), their daughter and their grandson, who is following the family naval tradition, by becoming an officer in the Canadian Forces Maritime Command.

== Awards and decorations ==
Timbrell's personal awards and decorations include the following:

Ribbon	Description	Notes
	Order of Military Merit (CMM)	Appointed Commander (CMM) on 12 June 1973
	Distinguished Service Cross (DSC)	Citation for Distinguished Service Cross (DSC)
	1939–1945 Star	WWII 1939–1945
	Atlantic Star	WWII 1939–1945 with France & Germany Clasp
	Africa Star	WWII 1939–1945
	Defence Medal (United Kingdom)	WWII 1939–1945
	Canadian Volunteer Service Medal	WWII 1939–1945 with Overseas Service bar
	War Medal 1939–1945 with Mentioned in dispatches	WWII 1939–1945
	Canadian Centennial Medal	Decoration awarded in 1967
	Canadian Forces' Decoration (CD)	with two Clasp for 32 years of services

Military offices
Preceded by Henry Porter	Commander Maritime Command; 1971–1973	Succeeded by Douglas Boyle
