= Kenneth Dyer =

Royal Canadian Navy officer

- Born: 7 November 1915; Toungoo, Burma
- Died: 9 October 2000 (aged 84) Ottawa, Ontario
- Allegiance: Canada
- Branch: Royal Canadian Navy
- Service years: 1933–1967
- Rank: Vice-Admiral
- Commands: HMCS Skeena; HMCS Kootenay; HMCS Magnificent; Atlantic Coast; Royal Canadian Navy
- Conflicts: Second World War
- Awards: Distinguished Service Cross; Canadian Forces' Decoration

Vice Admiral Kenneth Lloyd Dyer DSC, CD (7 November 1915 – 9 October 2000) was a senior officer in the Royal Canadian Navy during the Cuban Missile Crisis.

== Naval career ==
Dyer joined the Royal Canadian Navy as a cadet on 1 October 1933. He served in the Second World War in command of the destroyer HMCS Skeena and then the destroyer HMCS Kootenay. He later commanded the aircraft carrier HMCS Magnificent from 1951 to 1953. He went on to be Assistant Chief of Naval Staff (Warfare) in 1956, Chief of Naval Personnel in 1957 and Flag Officer Atlantic Coast in 1960. In the latter role he put his fleet on alert during the Cuban Missile Crisis. His last role was as Principal Naval Adviser from 1964 to 1966.

== Awards and decorations ==
Dyer's personal awards and decorations include the following:

Ribbon	Description	Notes
	Distinguished Service Cross (DSC)	Citation for Distinguished Service Cross (DSC)
	1939–1945 Star	WWII 1939-1945
	Atlantic Star	WWII 1939-1945
	Defence Medal (United Kingdom)	WWII 1939-1945
	Canadian Volunteer Service Medal	WWII 1939–1945 with Overseas Service bar
	War Medal 1939–1945 with Mentioned in dispatches	WWII 1939-1945
	Queen Elizabeth II Coronation Medal	Decoration awarded in 1952
	Canadian Forces' Decoration (CD)	with two Clasp for 32 years of services

Military offices
Preceded by Herbert Rayner (as Chief of the Naval Staff)	Principal Naval Adviser; 1964–1966	Succeeded by Ralph Hennessy
