= Atlantic Fleet =

Atlantic Fleet may refer to:

- Atlantic Fleet (United Kingdom)
- United States Atlantic Fleet, now the U.S. Fleet Forces Command

== See also ==
- Maritime Forces Atlantic in the Canadian Forces
