= Peter Cairns =

Canadian naval officer

- Born: October 4, 1938; Orillia, Ontario, Canada
- Died: February 18, 2023 (aged 84) Ottawa, Ontario, Canada
- Allegiance: Canada
- Branch: Royal Canadian Navy; Canadian Forces Maritime Command
- Service years: 1959–1994
- Rank: Vice-Admiral
- Commands: HMCS Onondaga; First Canadian Submarine Squadron; HMCS Fraser; HMCS Margaree; HMCS Assiniboine; Maritime Warfare School; Fifth Canadian Destroyer Squadron; Maritime Forces Pacific; Maritime Command
- Awards: Commander of the Order of Military Merit; Canadian Forces' Decoration
- Other work: Director - Spar Aerospace

Vice-Admiral Peter William Cairns CMM CD (October 4, 1938 – February 18, 2023) was an officer of the Canadian Armed Forces. He was Commander Maritime Command from 14 July 1992 to 28 July 1994.

== Career ==
Cairns joined the Royal Canadian Navy in 1956 and was appointed a midshipman in 1959. He became Commanding Officer of the submarine HMCS Onondaga in 1972, Commander of the First Canadian Submarine Squadron in 1974 and Commanding Officer of the destroyer HMCS Fraser in 1976. He went on to command the destroyers HMCS Margaree in 1977 and HMCS Assiniboine in 1978. He became Deputy Commandant of the Canadian Forces Fleet School at Halifax in 1978. After that he was appointed Chief Project Technical Officer at Canadian Forces Maritime Command in 1979, Commandant of the Canadian Forces Maritime Warfare School later that year and Commander Fifth Canadian Destroyer Squadron in 1981. Next he became Chief of Personnel Careers (Officers and Senior Appointments) at the National Defence Headquarters in 1983, Director-General Personnel Careers (Officers) in 1985 and Deputy Chief of Staff (Operations) to the Supreme Allied Commander Atlantic in 1987. His last appointments were as Commander Maritime Forces Pacific in 1989 and as Commander Maritime Command in 1992 before he retired in 1994.

In retirement Cairns became Director of Business Development at the Aviation Services Division of Spar Aerospace. He died in Ottawa, Ontario on February 18, 2023, at the age of 84.

== Awards and decorations ==
Cairns's personal awards and decorations include:

Ribbon	Description	Notes
	Order of Military Merit (CMM)	Appointed Commander (CMM) on 8 June 1990
	Queen Elizabeth II Silver Jubilee Medal	Decoration awarded in 1977; Canadian version
	Canadian Forces' Decoration (CD)	with two Clasp for 32 years of services

- He was a qualified Submariner and as such wore the Canadian Forces Submariner Dolphins

Military offices
Preceded by John Anderson	Commander Maritime Command; 1992–1994	Succeeded by Larry Murray
