= Robert George (Canadian admiral) =

Canadian naval officer (born 1940)

- Born: 6 October 1940 (age 85); Prince Albert, Saskatchewan
- Allegiance: Canada
- Branch: Royal Canadian Navy; Canadian Forces
- Service years: 1961-c.1994
- Rank: Vice-Admiral
- Commands: HMCS Margaree; HMCS Iroquois; Second Canadian Destroyer Squadron; Maritime Forces Pacific; Maritime Command
- Awards: Commander of the Order of Military Merit; Canadian Forces' Decoration

Vice-Admiral Robert Earl Douglas George CMM, CD (born 6 October 1940) is a retired officer of the Canadian Forces. He was the 22nd Commander Maritime Command from 1 August 1989 to 12 July 1991.

== Career ==
George joined the Royal Canadian Navy in 1961. He became Commanding Officer of the destroyer HMCS Margaree in 1974, Senior staff Officer (Combat Systems Readiness) in 1976 and Commanding Officer of the destroyer HMCS Iroquois in 1977. He went on to be Commander of the Second Canadian Destroyer Squadron in 1982, Director General of Maritime Doctrine and Operations at the National Defence Headquarters in 1984 and Commander Maritime Forces Pacific in 1987. After that he became Commander Maritime Command in 1989, in which role he despatched the supply ship HMCS Protecteur to the Persian Gulf during the Gulf War, before becoming Deputy Chief of the Defence Staff from 1991 and Canadian Military Representative to the NATO Military Committee in 1992 and then retiring.

== Awards and decorations ==
George's personal awards and decorations include the following:

Ribbon	Description	Notes
	Order of Military Merit (CMM)	Appointed Commander (CMM) on 12 December 1988
	Queen Elizabeth II Silver Jubilee Medal	Decoration awarded in 1977; Canadian version
	Canadian Forces' Decoration (CD)	with two Clasp for 32 years of services

Military offices
Preceded by Charles Thomas	Commander Maritime Command; 1989–1991	Succeeded by John Anderson
