= John O'Brien (admiral) =

Canadian admiral

- Born: 16 December 1918; Hove, Sussex
- Died: 24 March 1996 (aged 77) Ottawa, Ontario
- Allegiance: Canada
- Branch: Royal Canadian Navy; Canadian Forces
- Service years: 1935–1973
- Rank: Vice-Admiral
- Commands: HMCS Bonaventure; Maritime Command; NATO Defense College
- Conflicts: Second World War
- Awards: Officer of the Order of Canada; Canadian Forces' Decoration

Vice Admiral John Charles O'Brien OC, CD (16 December 1918 – 24 March 1996) was a Canadian Forces officer who served as Commander Maritime Command from 19 July 1966 to 6 July 1970.

== Career ==
O'Brien joined the Royal Canadian Navy in 1935. He was in action off Norway in 1939, commanded a small boat at the Dunkirk evacuation in 1940, served as a Signals Officer for the Allied invasion of Sicily in 1943 during the Second World War. He became Director Naval Training in 1955, Director Naval Communications in 1957 and Commanding Officer of the aircraft carrier HMCS Bonaventure in 1959. He went on to be Naval Member of the Canadian Joint Staff in Washington, D.C. in 1961, Senior Canadian Officer Afloat (Atlantic) in 1964 and Commander Maritime Command in 1966. His last appointment was as Commandant of the NATO Defense College in Rome in 1970 before retiring in 1973.

O'Brien married Stephanie Frances Swire; she died on 2 October 2006.

== Awards and decorations ==
Obrien's personal awards and decorations include the following:

Ribbon	Description	Notes
	Order of Canada (OC)	Appointed Officer (OC) on 26 June 1970
	1939–1945 Star	WWII 1939-1945
	Atlantic Star	WWII 1939-1945
	Africa Star	WWII 1939-1945
	Italy Star	WWII 1939-1945
	Defence Medal (United Kingdom)	WWII 1939-1945
	Canadian Volunteer Service Medal	WWII 1939-1945 with Overseas Service bar
	War Medal 1939–1945	WWII 1939-1945
	Special Service Medal	with NATO-OTAN Clasp
	Queen Elizabeth II Coronation Medal	Decoration awarded in 1952
	Canadian Centennial Medal	Decoration awarded in 1967
	Queen Elizabeth II Silver Jubilee Medal	Decoration awarded in 1977; Canadian version
	125th Anniversary of the Confederation of Canada Medal	Decoration awarded in 1992
	Canadian Forces' Decoration (CD)	with two Clasp for 32 years of services; George VI version
	Order of Merit of the Italian Republic	Decoration awarded 31 August 1973; 2nd Class / Grand Officer level; (Italy) Italian award

Military offices
Preceded by William Landymore	Commander Maritime Command; 1966–1970	Succeeded by Henry Porter
