= James Wood (Canadian admiral) =

Canadian naval officer (1934–2020)

- Born: 29 August 1934; Charlottetown, Prince Edward Island
- Died: 2 March 2020 (aged 85) Halifax, Nova Scotia, Canada
- Allegiance: Canada
- Branch: Royal Canadian Navy; Canadian Forces
- Service years: 1951–1987
- Rank: Vice-Admiral
- Commands: HMCS Ojibwa; First Canadian Submarine Squadron; HMCS Protecteur; Maritime Command
- Awards: Commander of the Order of Military Merit; Order of Saint John; Canadian Forces' Decoration

Vice Admiral James Crilly Wood CMM CD (29 August 1934 – 2 March 2020) was a Canadian Forces officer who served as Commander Maritime Command from 29 July 1983 to 3 July 1987.

== Career ==
Wood joined the Royal Canadian Navy in 1951. He became Commanding Officer of the submarine HMCS Ojibwa in 1967, a staff officer in the Directorate of Equipment Requirements at the National Defence Headquarters in 1970 and Commander of the First Canadian Submarine Squadron in 1972. He went on to be Deputy Chief of Staff (Sea) in 1974, Commanding Officer of the supply ship HMCS Protecteur in 1976 and Deputy Chief of Staff Plans in 1977. After that he became Senior Maritime Liaison Officer to The Netherlands in 1979, Director General Maritime Doctrine and Operations at the National Defence Headquarters in 1980 and Chief of Maritime Doctrine and Operations in 1983. His last appointment was as Commander Maritime Command in 1983, in which role he demanded at least six more frigates to meet Canada's NATO commitment, before he retired in 1987.

Wood died in Halifax, Nova Scotia on 2 March 2020, at the age of 85.

== Awards and decorations ==
Wood's personal awards and decorations include the following:

Ribbon	Description	Notes
	Order of Military Merit (CMM)	Appointed Commander (CMM) on 23 December 1983
	Order of St John	Appointed Officer in 1987
	Canadian Centennial Medal	Decoration awarded in 1967
	Queen Elizabeth II Silver Jubilee Medal	Decoration awarded in 1977; Canadian version
	Canadian Forces' Decoration (CD)	with two Clasp for 32 years of service

- He was a qualified Submariner and as such wore the Canadian Forces Submariner Dolphins

Military offices
Preceded by Andrew Fulton	Commander Maritime Command; 1983–1987	Succeeded by Charles Thomas
