= Fred Sutherland (Canadian Air Force general) =

Canadian Air Force general

- Born: February 1942 (age 84); Halifax, Nova Scotia
- Military career
- Allegiance: Canada
- Branch: Air Command (Note: Known as Royal Canadian Air Force until 1968)
- Service years: 1960–1992
- Rank: Lieutenant-General
- Commands: 439 Tactical Fighter Squadron; CFB Cold Lake; Air Command
- Awards: Commander of the Order of Military Merit; Canadian Forces' Decoration

Lieutenant-General Fred Sutherland CMM, CD (born February 1942) is a Canadian retired air force general who was Commander, Air Command from 1989 to 1991 and Vice Chief of the Defence Staff from 1991 to 1992.

== Career ==
Sutherland joined the Royal Canadian Air Force in 1960 and, after graduating from the Royal Military College of Canada, trained as a fighter pilot. He became Commanding Officer of 439 Tactical Fighter Squadron at CFB Baden-Soellingen in 1976, Executive Assistant to the Commander, Air Command in 1978 and Director of Air Operations, Training and Nuclear Weapons at the National Defence Headquarters in 1980. He went on to be Commander of CFB Cold Lake in July 1982, was seconded to the Privy Council Office in July 1984 and became Chief of Personnel Development at the National Defence Headquarters in July 1986. His last appointments were as Commander, Air Command in August 1989 and Vice Chief of the Defence Staff in August 1991 before retiring in June 1992.

In retirement he became Deputy Minister of Industry, Trade and Tourism for the Province of Manitoba and then Corporate Vice-President Human Resources with McCain Foods. He was a Founder and Senior Mentor of the National Security Program (NSP) at the Canadian Forces College in Toronto from 1997 retiring in 2020.

== Notes ==
Military offices
Preceded by L A Ashley	Commander, Air Command; 1989–1991	Succeeded by D Huddleston
Preceded by C M W Thomas	Vice Chief of the Defence Staff; 1991–1992	Succeeded by J R Anderson
