= Herbert Rayner =

Royal Canadian Navy officer

Herbert Sharples Rayner
- Born: 16 January 1911; Clinton, Ontario
- Died: 30 May 1976 (aged 65) Ottawa, Ontario
- Allegiance: Canada
- Branch: Royal Canadian Navy
- Service years: 1928–1964
- Rank: Vice-Admiral
- Commands: HMCS Skeena; HMCS St. Laurent; HMCS Huron; HMCS Nootka; Naval Air Section, HMCS Stadacona; Canadian Services College Royal Roads; HMCS Magnificent; Maritime Forces Pacific; Royal Canadian Navy
- Conflicts: Second World War
- Awards: Distinguished Service Cross

Vice Admiral Herbert Sharples Rayner DSC & Bar, CD (16 January 1911 – 30 May 1976) was a Royal Canadian Navy officer who served as Chief of the Naval Staff from 1 August 1960 to 16 July 1964.

== Career ==
Herbert Sharples Rayner joined the Royal Canadian Navy in 1928. He served in the Second World War as Commanding Officer of the destroyer HMCS Skeena and then of the destroyer HMCS St. Laurent during 1940, as Staff Officer Operations to the Commander Atlantic Coast from 1942 and as Commanding Officer of the destroyer HMCS Huron from 1943 before becoming Director of Plans in 1944. He was awarded the Distinguished Service Cross for "courage and enterprise in action against enemy submarines in the Western Approaches" and a bar to his DSC for an action "against four German destroyers trying to break through to attack the Allied invasion fleet off Normandy".

He went on to be Commanding Officer of the destroyer HMCS Nootka in 1946, Commanding Officer of the Naval Air Section at the shore establishment HMCS Stadacona in 1947 and Commandant of the Canadian Services College Royal Roads in 1948. After that he became Secretary to the Chiefs of Staff Committee in 1950, Commanding Officer of the aircraft carrier HMCS Magnificent in 1953 and Naval Assistant to the Chief of the Naval Staff 1955. His last appointments were as Chief of Naval Personnel in 1955, Commander Maritime Forces Pacific in 1957 and as Chief of the Naval Staff from 1960 until retiring in 1964.

== Awards and decorations ==
Rayner's personal awards and decorations include the following:

Ribbon	Description	Notes
	Distinguished Service Cross (DSC) with bar	Citation for Distinguished Service Cross (DSC) - received in December 1940; Bar received in 1944
	1939–1945 Star	WWII 1939–1945
	Atlantic Star	WWII 1939–1945 with France & Germany Clasp
	Canadian Volunteer Service Medal	WWII 1939–1945 with Overseas Service bar
	War Medal 1939–1945 with Mentioned in dispatches	WWII 1939–1945
	Queen Elizabeth II Coronation Medal	Decoration awarded in 1952
	Canadian Forces' Decoration (CD)	with two Clasp for 32 years of services
	Legion of Honour	Legionnaire level; Citation; France award
	Croix de Guerre 1939–1945 with palm	Bronze palm, mentioned at the army level; Citation for Bronze palm; France award

Military offices
Preceded by Harry DeWolf	Chief of the Naval Staff; 1960–1964	Succeeded by Kenneth Dyer (as Principal Naval Adviser)
