= Andrew Fulton (admiral) =

Canadian admiral (1927–2021)

- Born: 23 January 1927; Ottawa, Ontario
- Died: 7 August 2021 (aged 94) Halifax, Nova Scotia, Canada
- Allegiance: Canada
- Branch: Royal Canadian Navy; Canadian Forces
- Service years: 1944–1983
- Rank: Vice-Admiral
- Commands: HMCS Outremont; HMCS Gatineau; HMCS Provider; Northern Region; Maritime Command
- Awards: Order of Military Merit; Order of St John; Canadian Forces' Decoration

Vice Admiral James Andrew Fulton CMM, CD (23 January 1927 – 7 August 2021) was a Canadian Forces officer who served as Commander Maritime Command from 6 August 1980 to 29 July 1983.

== Career ==
Fulton joined the Royal Canadian Navy in 1944 and completed his training in 1946. He became Commanding Officer of the frigate HMCS Outremont in 1961 while he was Lieutenant-Commander (LCdr), Deputy Program Manager Missile Systems 1962 and Director of Naval Operations at National Defence Headquarters in 1964. He went on to be Commanding Officer of the destroyer HMCS Gatineau in 1965 with the rank of Commander (Cdr), Deputy Representative of the Supreme Allied Commander Atlantic at NATO Headquarters in Paris in 1966 and Commanding Officer of the supply ship HMCS Provider in 1969 as Capitain (Capt (N)). After that he became Commander Northern Region in 1973, Director General Current Policy in 1975 and Chief of Personnel (Careers & Senior Appointments) in 1976. His last appointments were as Canadian Military Representative to the NATO Military Committee in 1978 and Commander Maritime Command on 6 August 1980, in which role he undertook some astute political manoeuvring to get the Patrol Frigate Project and Tribal Update and Modernization Project approved, before retiring on 29 July 1983.

He died on 7 August 2021 in Halifax, Nova Scotia.

== Awards and decorations ==
Fulton's personal awards and decorations include the following:

Ribbon	Description	Notes
	Order of Military Merit (CMM)	Appointed Commander (CMM) on 8 December 1980; Appointed Officer (OMM) on 13 December 1972
	Order of St John	Appointed Officer in 1975
	Korea Medal	1950-1953
	Canadian Volunteer Service Medal for Korea	
	United Nations Service Medal Korea	1950-1954
	Queen Elizabeth II Silver Jubilee Medal	Decoration awarded in 1977; Canadian version
	Canadian Forces' Decoration (CD)	with two Clasp for 32 years of services

Military offices
Preceded by John Allan	Commander Maritime Command; 1980–1983	Succeeded by James Wood
