= Commander of the Royal Canadian Navy =

Institutional head of the Royal Canadian Navy

Commander of the Royal Canadian Navy and Chief of the Naval Staff
- Commandant de la Marine royale canadienne
- Incumbent; Vice-Admiral Dan Charlebois since 16 June 2026
- Royal Canadian Navy
- Type: Commissioned officer
- Status: Currently constituted
- Abbreviation: Comd RCN
- Reports to: Chief of the Defence Staff
- Seat: Naval Staff Headquarters, National Defence Headquarters, Ottawa, Ontario
- Term length: At His Majesty's pleasure
- Precursor: Chief of the Maritime Staff
- First holder: Admiral Sir Charles Kingsmill
- Deputy: Deputy Commander of the Royal Canadian Navy/Assistant Chief of the Naval Staff
- Website: Official website

Commander of the Royal Canadian Navy (French: Commandant de la Marine royale canadienne) is the title of the institutional head of the Royal Canadian Navy. This appointment also includes the title of Chief of the Naval Staff and is based at National Defence Headquarters in Ottawa, Ontario. This individual reports to the Chief of the Defence Staff, who then responds to the Commander-in-Chief of the Canadian Armed Forces.

== History of the position ==
The appointment was entitled Director of the Naval Service from 1910 to 1928 and then Chief of the Naval Staff from 1928 to 1964. In August 1964 the position of Chief of the Naval Staff was abolished. Responsibility for naval matters was split between the newly established Defence Staff in Ottawa and operational headquarters in Halifax (for Flag Officer Atlantic Coast) and Esquimalt (for Flag Officer Pacific Coast). The appointment was entitled Commander of Maritime Command from 1966 to 1997 and Chief of the Maritime Staff from 1997 to 2011. In 2011 Maritime Command was renamed the Royal Canadian Navy at which time the appointment was renamed to its present incarnation.

== Insignia and flag ==
Vice-Admiral's insignia

Vice-Admiral's flag

== Appointees ==
The following table lists all those who have held the post of Commander of the Royal Canadian Navy or its preceding positions. Ranks and honours are as at the completion of their tenure:

| No. | Portrait | Name | Took office | Left office | Time in office |
Director of the Naval Service
| 1 | Sir C.E. Kingsmill | Admiral; Sir C.E. Kingsmill (1855–1935) | 5 May 1910 | 31 December 1920 | 10 years, 7 months |
| 2 | W. Hose | Commodore; W. Hose (1875–1965) | 1 January 1921 | 6 March 1928 | 7 years, 2 months |
Chief of the Naval Staff
| (2) | W. Hose | Rear Admiral; W. Hose (1875–1965) | 7 March 1928 | 31 December 1933 | 5 years, 9 months |
| - | P.W. Nelles | Captain; P.W. Nelles (1892–1951); Acting | 1 January 1934 | 1 July 1934 | 6 months |
| 3 | P.W. Nelles | Vice Admiral; P.W. Nelles (1892–1951) | 1 July 1934 | 15 January 1944 | 9 years, 6 months |
| 4 | G.C. Jones | Vice Admiral; G.C. Jones (1895–1946) | 15 January 1944 | 8 February 1946 † | 2 years |
| 5 | H.E. Reid | Vice Admiral; H.E. Reid (1897–1962) | 28 February 1946 | 1 September 1947 | 1 year, 6 months |
| 6 | H.T.W. Grant | Vice Admiral; H.T.W. Grant (1899–1965) | 1 September 1947 | 1 December 1951 | 4 years, 3 months |
| 7 | E.R. Mainguy | Vice Admiral; E.R. Mainguy (1901–1979) | 1 December 1951 | 16 January 1956 | 4 years, 1 month |
| 8 | H.G. DeWolf | Vice Admiral; H.G. DeWolf (1903–2000) | 16 January 1956 | 1 August 1960 | 4 years, 6 months |
| 9 | H.S. Rayner | Vice Admiral; H.S. Rayner (1911–1976) | 1 August 1960 | 1 August 1964 | 4 years |
Principal Naval Adviser
| 10 | K.L. Dyer | Vice Admiral; K.L. Dyer (1915–2000) (Note: The Royal Canadian Navy had no official head between August 1964, when the position of Chief of the Naval Staff was abolished, and January 1966, when the position of Commander of Maritime Command was established. In February 1968 the Royal Canadian Navy ceased to exist after it was unified with the Canadian Army and the Royal Canadian Air Force to form the Canadian Forces.) | 1 August 1964 | 16 July 1966 | 1 year, 11 months |
| 11 | R.L. Hennessy | Vice Admiral; R.L. Hennessy (1918–2014) | 16 July 1966 | 15 September 1968 | 2 years, 1 month |
Commander of Maritime Command
| 12 | W.M. Landymore | Rear Admiral; W.M. Landymore (1916–2008) (Note: In January 1966 he was appointed as the first Commander Maritime Command, in which position he served until he was encouraged to take an early retirement in July 1966, after a disagreement with the Minister of National Defence over the continuation of the traditional naval identity.) | 1 January 1966 | 19 July 1966 | 6 months |
| 13 | J.C. O'Brien | Vice Admiral; J.C. O'Brien (1918–1996) (Note: In the rank of Rear Admiral between 1966–1968 and Vice-Admiral between 1968–1970.) | 19 July 1966 | 6 July 1970 | 3 years, 11 months |
| 14 | H.A. Porter | Vice Admiral; H.A. Porter (1922–2016) | 6 July 1970 | 18 October 1971 | 1 year, 3 months |
| 15 | R.W. Timbrell | Rear Admiral; R.W. Timbrell (1920–2006) | 18 October 1971 | 21 August 1973 | 1 year, 10 months |
| 16 | D.S. Boyle | Vice Admiral; D.S. Boyle (1923–2001) | 21 August 1973 | 14 June 1977 | 3 years, 9 months |
| 17 | A.L. Collier | Vice Admiral; A.L. Collier (1924–1987) | 15 June 1977 | 30 June 1979 | 2 years |
| 18 | J. Allan | Vice Admiral; J. Allan (1928–2014) | 1 July 1979 | 5 August 1980 | 1 year, 1 month |
| 19 | J.A. Fulton | Vice Admiral; J.A. Fulton (1927–2021) | 6 August 1980 | 29 July 1983 | 2 years, 11 months |
| 20 | J.C. Wood | Vice Admiral; J.C. Wood (born 1934) | 29 July 1983 | 3 July 1987 | 3 years, 11 months |
| 21 | C.M.W. Thomas | Vice Admiral; C.M.W. Thomas (born 1936) | 3 July 1987 | 1 August 1989 | 2 years |
| 22 | R.E. George | Vice Admiral; R.E. George (born 1940) | 1 August 1989 | 12 July 1991 | 1 year, 11 months |
| 23 | J.R. Anderson | Vice Admiral; J.R. Anderson (born 1941) | 12 July 1991 | 14 July 1992 | 1 year |
| 24 | P.W. Cairns | Vice Admiral; P.W. Cairns (1938–2023) | 14 July 1992 | 28 July 1994 | 2 years |
| 25 | L.E. Murray | Vice Admiral; L.E. Murray (born 1947) | 28 July 1994 | 27 June 1995 | 10 months |
| 26 | L.G. Mason | Vice Admiral; L.G. Mason (born 1942) | 27 June 1995 | 9 January 1997 | 1 year, 6 months |
Chief of the Maritime Staff
| 27 | G.L. Garnett | Vice Admiral; G.L. Garnett (born 1944) | 9 January 1997 | 24 September 1997 | 8 months |
| 28 | G.R. Maddison | Vice Admiral; G.R. Maddison (born 1949) | 24 September 1997 | 21 June 2001 | 3 years, 8 months |
| 29 | R.D. Buck | Vice Admiral; R.D. Buck | 21 June 2001 | 25 August 2004 | 3 years, 2 months |
| 30 | M.B. MacLean | Vice Admiral; M.B. MacLean | 25 August 2004 | 17 January 2006 | 1 year, 4 months |
| 31 | D.W. Robertson | Vice Admiral; D.W. Robertson | 17 January 2006 | 22 June 2009 | 3 years, 5 months |
| 32 | P.D. McFadden | Vice Admiral; P.D. McFadden (born 1957) | 22 June 2009 | 22 July 2011 | 2 years, 1 month |
Chief of the Naval Staff and Commander of the Royal Canadian Navy
| 33 | P.A. Maddison | Vice Admiral; P.A. Maddison | 22 July 2011 | 20 June 2013 | 1 year, 10 months |
| 34 | M.A.G. Norman | Vice Admiral; M.A.G. Norman (born 1964) | 20 June 2013 | 23 June 2016 | 3 years |
| 35 | M.F.R. Lloyd | Vice Admiral; M.F.R. Lloyd (born 1963) | 23 June 2016 | 12 June 2019 | 2 years, 11 months |
| 36 | A.G. McDonald | Vice Admiral; A.G. McDonald (born 1967) | 12 June 2019 | 12 January 2021 | 1 year, 7 months |
| 37 | C.A. Baines | Vice Admiral; C.A. Baines (born c. 1960s) | 12 January 2021 | 30 May 2022 | 1 year, 4 months |
| 38 | A. Topshee | Vice Admiral; A. Topshee (born 1971) | 30 May 2022 | 16 June 2026 | 4 years, 4 months |
| 39 | D. Charlebois | Vice Admiral; D. Charlebois (born 1975) | 16 June 2026 | Incumbent | 4 months |

== See also ==
- Chief of the Defence Staff, the second most senior member of the Canadian Armed Forces after the Commander-in-Chief
- Commander of the Canadian Army, the institutional head of the Canadian Army
- Commander of the Royal Canadian Air Force, the institutional head of the Royal Canadian Air Force
