= John Allan (Canadian naval officer) =

- Born: 31 March 1928; Kirkland Lake, Ontario, Canada
- Died: 1 May 2014 (aged 86); Ottawa, Ontario, Canada
- Military career
- Allegiance: Canada
- Branch: Royal Canadian Navy; Canadian Forces Maritime Command
- Service years: 1946–1980
- Rank: Vice-Admiral
- Nickname: Jock
- Commands: HMCS Qu'Appelle; First Canadian Destroyer Squadron; Maritime Command
- Awards: Order of Military Merit; Canadian Forces' Decoration

Vice Admiral John Allan CMM CD (31 March 1928 – 1 May 2014) was a Canadian Forces officer who served as Commander of Maritime Command from 1 July 1979 to 6 August 1980.

== Career ==
Allan joined the Royal Canadian Navy (RCN) as an Ordinary Seaman in 1946. He left the RCN in 1952 as a Petty Officer 2nd class. The next year, he re-enrolled as an Officer Cadet and was commissioned as an acting sub-lieutenant in 1954. He continued his studies at Queen's University, graduating in 1955. . He became commanding officer of the destroyer escort HMCS Qu'Appelle in 1968, project manager of the DDH 280 Program at National Defence Headquarters in 1970 and Commander First Canadian Destroyer Squadron in 1973. He went on to be Chief of Staff (Sea) in 1974, Director General Maritime Engineering and Maintenance in 1975 and Associate Assistant Deputy Minister Materiel in 1977. His last appointments were as Commander Maritime Command in 1979, in which role he claimed that budget cutbacks were restricting the activities of Maritime Command, and Deputy Chief of Defence Staff in 1980. He served in this position until he retired in 1982.

He died on 1 May 2014 in Ottawa.

== Awards and decorations ==
Allan's personal awards and decorations include the following:

Ribbon	Description	Notes
	Order of Military Merit (CMM)	Appointed Commander (CMM) on 18 June 1979; Appointed Officer (OMM) on 13 December 1973
	Queen Elizabeth II Silver Jubilee Medal	Decoration awarded in 1977; Canadian version
	Canadian Forces' Decoration (CD)	with two Clasp for 32 years of services

Military offices
Preceded by Andrew Collier	Commander Maritime Command; 1979–1980	Succeeded by Andrew Fulton
