= Harry DeWolf =

Canadian naval officer (1903–2000)

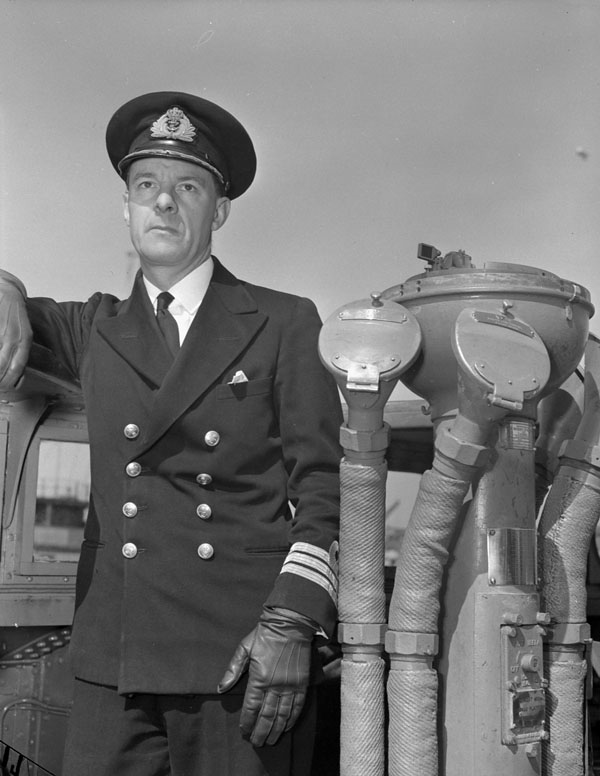
- Commander Harry G. DeWolf, Commanding Officer, on the bridge of the destroyer HMCS Haida, 5 May 1944
- Born: Henry George DeWolf; 26 June 1903; Bedford, Nova Scotia, Canada
- Died: 18 December 2000 (aged 97); Ottawa, Ontario, Canada
- Relatives: DeWolf family
- Military career
- Allegiance: Canada
- Branch: Royal Canadian Navy
- Service years: 1918–1960
- Rank: Vice-Admiral
- Nickname: Hard-Over-Harry
- Commands: HMCS Festubert; HMCS St. Laurent; HMCS Haida; HMCS Warrior; HMCS Magnificent; Flag Officer Pacific Coast; Chief of the Naval Staff
- Conflicts: World War II: Dunkirk evacuation; Battle of the Atlantic; Arctic convoys; Operation Overlord; Battle of Ushant
- Awards: Commander of the Order of the British Empire; Distinguished Service Order; Distinguished Service Cross; Mentioned in Despatches; Canadian Forces' Decoration; Legion of Merit (United States); Légion d'honneur (France)

Vice Admiral Henry George DeWolf CBE, DSO, DSC, CD (26 June 1903 – 18 December 2000) was a Canadian naval officer who was famous as the first commander of the destroyer HMCS Haida during the Second World War. He helped destroy 14 German ships or submarines in the period before, during and immediately after the Invasion of Normandy. He was the most decorated naval officer in the Royal Canadian Navy (RCN) in that war. During that time, he and the crew of Haida were remembered for trying to save the crew of Haida's sister ship, HMCS Athabaskan, in early May 1944 after the vessel sank. After the Second World War, he commanded Canada's first aircraft carriers, HMCS Warrior and HMCS Magnificent. In the wake of 42 years of service, he retired in the early 1960s from the RCN. He aided in the plan to conserve Haida and was present in Toronto when the ship was handed over officially to civilians to become a memorial/museum ship in the 1960s.

== Early years ==
Harry George DeWolf was born on 26 June 1903 into a shipping broker family in Bedford, Nova Scotia. DeWolf entered the Royal Canadian Navy (RCN) in 1918 at age 15 when he attended the Royal Naval College of Canada (RNCC) at Esquimalt, British Columbia because the original Halifax-based school was destroyed by the 6 December 1917 Halifax Explosion. DeWolf graduated from RNCC in 1921 and was sent on an exchange with the Royal Navy to serve on board the battleship HMS Resolution. He was promoted to sub-lieutenant in 1924 and took a six-month course in gunnery, torpedoes and navigation at the Royal Naval College, Greenwich. Returning to Canada in the summer of 1925, he was posted to one of the RCN's two destroyers, HMCS Patriot. In early 1930, Lieutenant DeWolf received his first command, the Battle-class trawler HMCS Festubert at Halifax. In May 1931, he married Gwendolen Gilbert of Somerset, Bermuda, whom he had met while serving aboard HMCS Patriot, which had spent a winter training there several years earlier. In 1932, DeWolf was posted to the destroyer HMCS Vancouver and then in 1933 to the destroyer HMCS Skeena. In July 1935, he was promoted to lieutenant commander and posted to National Defence Headquarters (NDHQ) in Ottawa. He was made Assistant Director of Intelligence and Plans.

== Second World War ==
=== HMCS St. Laurent ===
DeWolf returned to Canada in 1939 and was appointed commanding officer of the destroyer HMCS St. Laurent. St. Laurent was posted to convoy duty out of Halifax. St. Laurent under DeWolf reportedly fired the RCN's first shots of the war as they helped rescue British and French troops escaping from continental Europe during Operation Dynamo after the Fall of France in late May and early June 1940. St. Laurent returned to convoy duty in the North Atlantic, and the following month, in July 1940, DeWolf's ship rescued 859 German and Italian prisoners of war, survivors of Arandora, which had been torpedoed by a U-boat, U-47. DeWolf was promoted to commander in 1940. He and his ship were mentioned in despatches twice during his service on St. Laurent.

Years later, he recalled the following incident, which took place while in command of St. Laurent:

The mechanism of a live, armed torpedo was being painted by a sailor, who first lifted the safety catch to paint underneath it, and then lifted the firing handle to paint under that. The torpedo fired, naturally, and ran wild on deck," he said. "It slammed into the deck house, bounced off and kept changing around. Everybody, including me, was scared. The decks cleared pretty rapidly. Since we thought we were all going up any second, Petty Officer Ridge and myself decided to try and tame the torpedo. We got astride it. It was as slippery as a greased pig and we thought its propeller might cut our feet off. We rode and guided it over the rail and stuck one leg over the rail to hold it steady. The propeller was making a tremendous racket on the iron deck. We finally managed to release the air cock (the torpedo was driven by compressed air). We still had a live torpedo. When we got to port (in the United Kingdom) we hoisted it on the wall and left it there. I reported to headquarters, but I don't know what became of the torpedo. (The warhead was eventually placed in a North Sea naval mine field.)

=== HMCS Haida ===
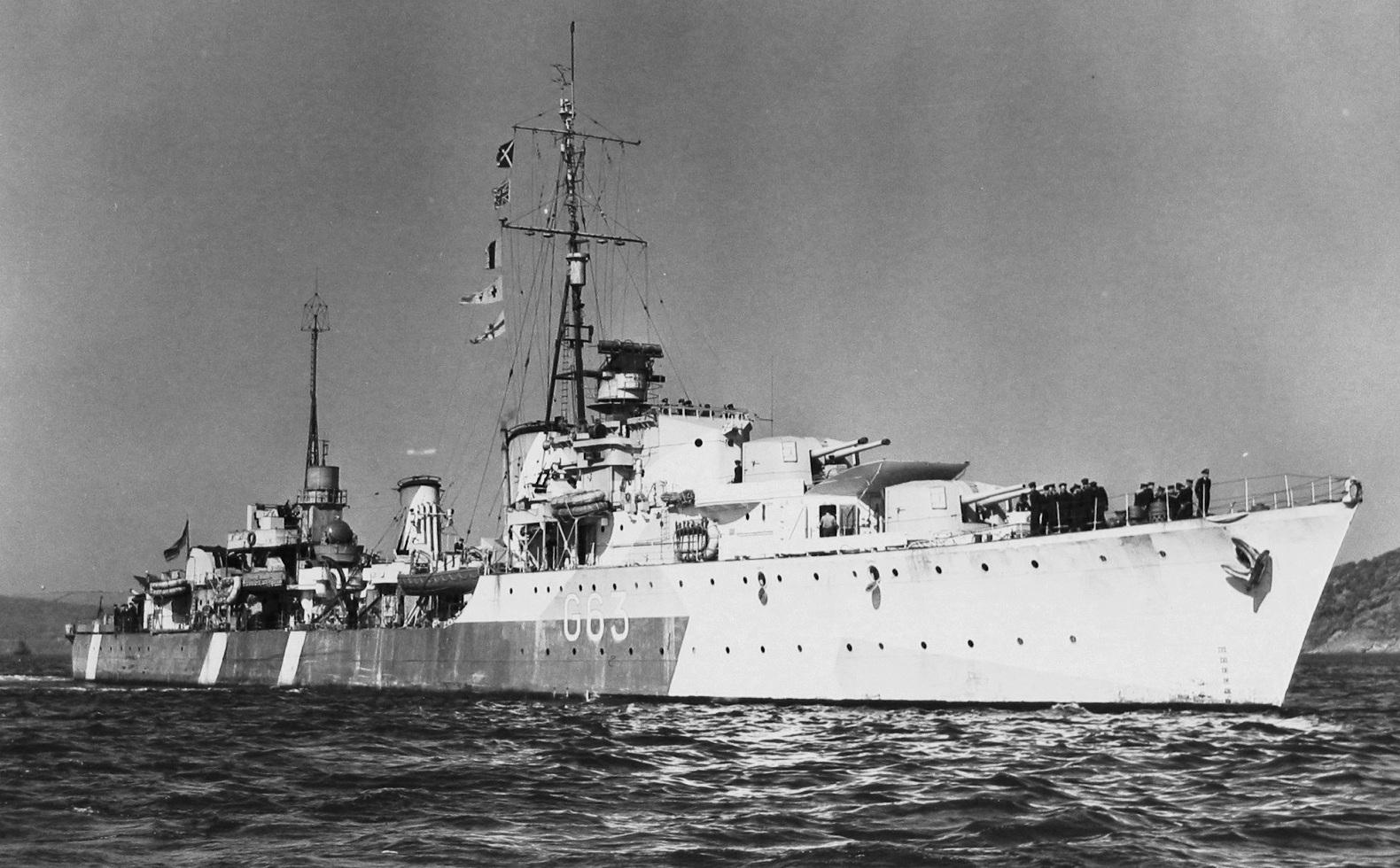
HMCS Haida during Second World War. DeWolf was in command of the destroyer from August 1943 to September 1944.

DeWolf took command of HMCS Haida in August 1943. Under DeWolf, Haida earned a reputation as "the Fightingest Ship in the Canadian Navy", and was responsible for sinking 14 enemy ships in just over a year, earning numerous accolades. Haida and DeWolf saw service with convoys to Murmansk as well as operations to secure the English Channel in preparation for Operation Overlord. Most of his more famous battles took place at night in the English Channel, when DeWolf secured his reputation as a fearless and skilful tactician and became known to his crew as "Hard-Over-Harry" for bold manoeuvres off the coast of France. DeWolf earned the Distinguished Service Order for rescuing survivors of HMCS Athabaskan within range of enemy coastal guns on the French coast. After the Allies liberated France, in late August 1944, he left Haida and was recalled to Ottawa, where he was promoted to captain in September 1944, becoming Assistant Chief of Naval Staff.

== Cold War ==
During the postwar years, DeWolf commanded the aircraft carriers HMCS Warrior and HMCS Magnificent between January 1947 and September 1948, before being promoted to rear admiral. He served as Flag Officer Pacific Coast at Esquimalt from 1948 to 1950, then was recalled to NDHQ where he served as Vice Chief of Naval Staff from 1950 to 1952, then was posted to Washington, D.C. as principal military advisor to the Canadian ambassador from 1952 to 1956. DeWolf was promoted to vice admiral in January 1956 and served as Chief of the Naval Staff before retiring from the RCN on 31 July 1960.

== Retirement ==
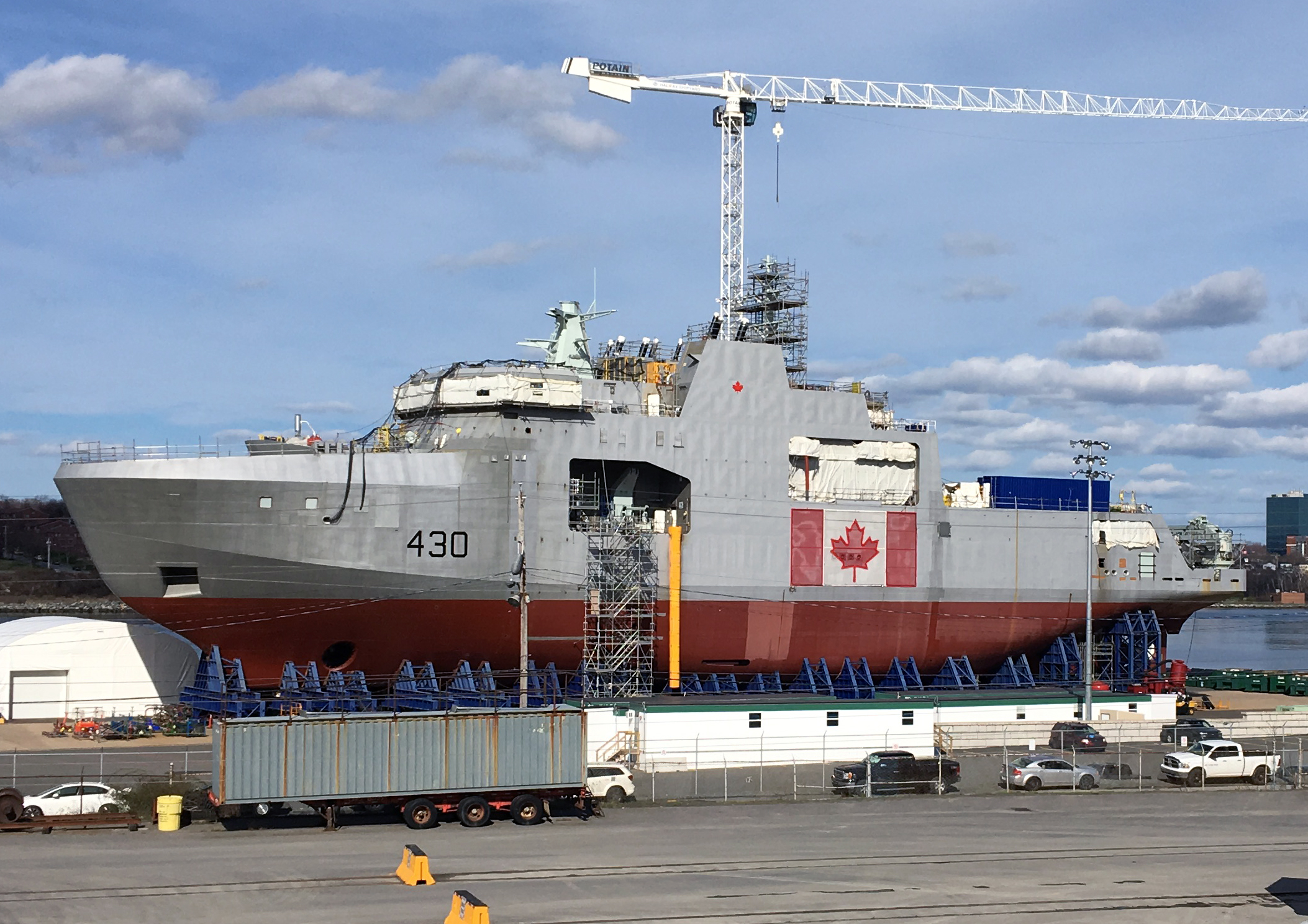
Construction for a Harry DeWolf-class offshore patrol vessel. In 2014, it was announced the class of ships, along with its lead ship, would be named after DeWolf in his honour.

DeWolf and his wife retired to her home in Bermuda, although they spent their summers in Ottawa, his last RCN posting. DeWolf was an active golfer and fisherman and he was active in the Royal Canadian Navy Benevolent Fund, which raises money for retired sailors down on their luck.

On 23 September 1992, the Town of Bedford named a 1.4-hectare (3.5-acre) waterfront park on the Bedford Basin after DeWolf. The minutes of 28 November 2000 meeting of the Halifax Regional Council reveal that DeWolf had contributed $100,000 to the municipality, presumably as thanks for naming the prominent Admiral Harry DeWolf Park after him.

He died in Ottawa on 18 December 2000 at the age of 97 and was buried at sea from HMCS Ville de Québec.

On 18 September 2014, it was announced that the planned new class of Canadian warships built specifically for the Arctic, and the lead ship of the class, the Harry DeWolf-class offshore patrol vessel, would be named after him.

== Awards and decorations ==
DeWolf's personal awards and decorations include the following:

Ribbon	Description	Notes
	Order of the British Empire (CBE)	Decoration awarded on 5 January 1946; Commander level; Citation
	Distinguished Service Order (DSO)	Decoration awarded on 27 May 1944; Citation<
	Distinguished Service Cross (DSC)	Decoration awarded on 20 January 1945; Citation
	1939–1945 Star	WWII 1939-1945
	Atlantic Star	WWII 1939-1945 with France & Germany Clasp
	Canadian Volunteer Service Medal	WWII 1939-1945 with Overseas Service bar
	War Medal 1939–1945 with Mentioned in dispatches	WWII 1939-1945; Citation for - MID (1st); Citation for - MID (2nd); Citation for - MID (3rd); Citation for - MID (4th)
	Queen Elizabeth II Coronation Medal	Decoration awarded in 1952
	Canadian Forces' Decoration (CD)	with three Clasp for 42 years of services
	Legion of Merit (United States)	Decoration awarded on 3 September 1946; Officer level; Citation; United States award
	Legion of Honour	Decoration awarded on 29 August 1947; Officer level; Citation; (France) French award
	Croix de Guerre 1939–1945 with palm	Decoration awarded on 25 August 1947; Citation; (France) French award
	King Haakon VII Freedom Cross	Decoration awarded on 8 January 1949; Citation; (Norway) Norwegian award

Military offices
Preceded by Rollo Mainguy	Chief of the Naval Staff; 1956–1960	Succeeded by Herbert Rayner
