= Rollo Mainguy =

Canadian Navy admiral (1901–1979)

Edmond Rollo Mainguy OBE, CD
- Commander Mainguy in HMCS Ottawa off Botwood, Newfoundland, on 22 June 1940
- Born: May 1, 1901; Victoria, British Columbia
- Died: April 29, 1979 (aged 77); Nanaimo, British Columbia
- Military career
- Allegiance: Canada
- Branch: Royal Canadian Navy
- Service years: 1915–1956
- Rank: Vice-Admiral
- Commands: Chief of the Naval Staff; HMCS Assiniboine; HMCS Ottawa; HMCS Uganda
- Conflicts: Second World War; Battle of the Atlantic; Battle of Okinawa
- Awards: Officer of the Order of the British Empire; Canadian Forces' Decoration; Mentioned in Despatches; Officer of the Legion of Merit (United States)

Vice-Admiral Edmond Rollo Mainguy, OBE, CD (11 May 1901 – 29 April 1979) was a senior officer in the Royal Canadian Navy.

== Naval career ==
Mainguy was born in Victoria, British Columbia, on 11 May 1901. He attended the Royal Naval College of Canada in 1915 during the First World War.

Following the outbreak of the Second World War, Mainguy took command of HMCS Assiniboine and then HMCS Ottawa before being promoted to captain and taking overall command of Royal Canadian Navy (RCN) destroyers in Halifax in 1941. In 1942 he was appointed acting commodore and took command of RCN destroyers in Newfoundland, quickly followed by an appointment to Ottawa as Chief of Naval Personnel. He returned to active duty as the commanding officer of HMCS Uganda in 1944. As a part of British Pacific Fleet, Uganda took part in the Okinawa campaign.

In the post-war years Mainguy was appointed Flag Officer Pacific Coast in 1946, Flag Officer Atlantic Coast in 1948, and was the head of the commission that investigated the RCN insubordination incidents of 1949 before becoming Chief of the Naval Staff in 1951.

Mainguy retired from the Royal Canadian Navy in 1956 as a vice-admiral. In retirement he was president of Great Lakes Shipping until 1965. He died in 1979.

== Family ==
Mainguy married Maraquita Nichol, daughter of Walter Cameron Nichol, in 1927. Their son, Daniel Mainguy, later also reached the rank of vice-admiral, serving as Vice Chief of the Defence Staff from 1983 to 1985.

Military offices
Preceded by Harold Grant	Chief of the Naval Staff; 1951–1956	Succeeded by Harry DeWolf
