= Charles Thomas (Canadian admiral) =

Canadian Admiral

- Born: 31 May 1936; Kelowna, British Columbia, Canada
- Died: 30 September 2022 (aged 86); Victoria, British Columbia, Canada
- Military career
- Allegiance: Canada
- Branch: Royal Canadian Navy; Maritime Command
- Service years: 1954–1991
- Rank: Vice-Admiral
- Commands: HMCS Fraser; 4th Canadian Escort Squadron; Maritime Command
- Awards: Commander of the Order of Military Merit; Canadian Forces' Decoration

Vice Admiral Charles Morris Winton "Chuck" Thomas CMM CD (31 May 1936 – 30 September 2022) was a Canadian Forces officer who served as Vice Chief of the Defence Staff.

== Career ==
Thomas joined the Royal Canadian Navy in 1954. He became Commanding Officer of the destroyer HMCS Fraser in 1971, Senior Staff Officer (Training) in 1973 and Senior Staff Officer (Combat Readiness) in 1973. He went on to be Chief of Staff (Personnel & Training) in 1975, Commanding Officer of the 4th Canadian Escort Squadron in 1976 and Director Maritime Requirements (Sea) at the National Defence Headquarters in 1979. After that he was Director General Maritime Doctrine and Operations in 1982, Chief of Maritime Doctrine and Operations in 1984 and Commander Maritime Command in 1987. His last appointment was as Vice Chief of the Defence Staff in 1989 before resigning over policy issues in 1991. His resignation reflected his belief that the Canadian Government should have been reducing the network of 40 armed forces bases rather than just reducing the headcount. General John de Chastelain, Chief of the Defence Staff, responded attacking Thomas' motives rather than responding to his concerns.

Thomas died on 30 September 2022, at the age of 86.

== Awards and decorations ==
Thomas's personal awards and decorations include the following:

Ribbon	Description	Notes
	Order of Military Merit (CMM)	Appointed Commander (CMM) on 15 December 1986
	Canadian Forces' Decoration (CD)	with two Clasp for 32 years of service

Military offices
Preceded by James Wood	Commander Maritime Command; 1987–1989	Succeeded by Robert George
Preceded by John de Chastelain	Vice Chief of the Defence Staff; 1989–1991	Succeeded by Fred Sutherland
