= Maritime Forces Atlantic =

Canadian Navy unit for fleet training and readiness in the Atlantic and Arctic

- Country: Canada
- Branch: Royal Canadian Navy
- Size: 10,700
- Garrison/HQ: Canadian Forces Base Halifax
- Mottos: Ready, aye, ready
- Website: canada.ca/en/navy/corporate/our-organization/structure/marlant.html

Commanders
- Commander of Maritime Forces Atlantic: RAdm Josee Kurtz
- Commander of Canadian Fleet Atlantic: Cmdre Jacob French
- Commodore-in-Chief (Fleet Atlantic): King Charles III

In the Canadian Forces, Maritime Forces Atlantic (MARLANT) is responsible for the fleet training and operational readiness of the Royal Canadian Navy in the Atlantic Ocean and Arctic Ocean. It was once referred to as Canadian Atlantic Station.

== Structure ==
The Commander Maritime Forces Atlantic (COMMARLANT) is also the Commander Joint Task Force Atlantic (COMMJTFA), holding the rank of rear admiral.

Reporting to the commander is the commander of Canadian Fleet Atlantic (COMCANFLTLANT), holding the rank of commodore. This officer commands Canadian Fleet Atlantic (CANFLTLANT), and is responsible for the operation and readiness of all warships, auxiliaries and support vessels. COMCANFLTLANT is also the Canadian Task Group Commander for any CANFLTLANT deployment of ships to exercises or operations.

During the 1962 Cuban Missile Crisis:

the operational commander in Halifax, Rear Admiral Kenneth Dyer, was not prepared to take any chances in the nuclear age, and the scope of the Canadian Navy’s actions capture the seriousness of the crisis: ships and aircraft were dispersed with wartime payloads and provisions; secondary headquarters and bases were prepared; vessels in maintenance were rushed to sea; and Bonaventure and its escorts were ordered home from a NATO exercise in the eastern Atlantic. Of the 136 “contact events” made in or near Canada’s WESTLANT (western Atlantic) zone – without Soviet archival corroboration the number that were actual submarines remains a mystery – there is little doubt that HMCS Kootenay was firmly tracking a Foxtrot off Georges Bank in early November.

Previous the commander of RCN forces in the Atlantic was the Commanding Officer, Atlantic Coast, during the war Commodore George Jones in 1940, later Rear-Admiral Leonard W. Murray, who served as Commander Canadian Northwest Atlantic 1943-45. After the war the title became Flag Officer, Atlantic Coast, from 1948 Rear-Admiral Rollo Mainguy; Roger Bidwell in the 1950s ; Rear-Admiral Kenneth Dyer in October 1962 during the Cuban Missile Crisis; Commodore Ralph Henessy (August 1963-October 1964) in August 1964 Rear-Admiral Jeffrey Brock, DSO, DSC, CD (to November 1964)(p.5; Rear-Adm William Landymore by 1965; (p.9); Rear-Admiral John O'Brien by 1966 (p.14); thereafter the position may have been amalgamated with Commander Maritime Command for several years; Rear Admiral Greg Maddison (1 July 1997, p.133); Rear-Admiral Duncan "Dusty" Miller (1 Oct 1997 to 2000, p.150).

== Units and facilities ==
MARLANT headquarters is at CFB Halifax in Halifax, Nova Scotia.

Other facilities include:

- CANFLTLANT HQ (Building D-166)
- Fifth Maritime Operations Group (Building D-165/166)
- Sea Training Atlantic (Building D-166)
- CFAD Bedford
- CFS St. John's
- Fleet Diving Unit Atlantic
- NRS Newport Corner
- NRS Mill Cove
- Shearwater Heliport
- HMC Dockyard
- HMCS Trinity
- Stadacona
- Stadacona Band of Maritime Forces Atlantic

Prior to Unification the Atlantic Command assignments were:

- HMCS Bonaventure
- First Canadian Escort Squadron – assigned WWII-era destroyers
- First Canadian Minesweeping Squadron
- Third Canadian Escort Squadron – assigned WWII-era destroyers
- Special Duties – escort maintenance ship, diving depot ship, gate vessel (A/S boom and training ship), 3 harbour patrol craft
- Fifth Canadian Escort Squadron – assigned post-WWII destroyers
- Sixth Submarine Squadron – a Royal Navy squadron based in Halifax with 2 WWII-era Amphion-class submarines to monitor Soviet activity in Caribbean especially during Cuban Missile Crisis. Both boats had been in Canada in the 1950s for brief anti-submarine training.
- Seventh Canadian Escort Squadron – assigned WWII-era frigates
- Ninth Canadian Escort Squadron – assigned WWII-era frigates
- Naval air squadrons
  - 870 Naval Air Squadron, later VF-870 – Banshees assigned to HMCS Bonaventure
  - VS-880 Anti-Submarine Squadron – CS2F1 Tracker A/S patrol
  - VU-32 Utility Air Squadron – Silver Star Jet trainers and Grumman Tracker A/S patrol
  - HS-50 Helicopter Strike Squadron – Sikorsky Sea King (A/S) and H04S (rescue)
  - HU-21 Helicopter Utility Squadron – Bell and Sikorsky Sea King and H04S
  - VX-10 Experimental Squadron – Various aircraft for experimental purposes (Grumman Avenger, Beechcraft Expeditor, Fairey Firefly, Bell HTL-4, Hawker Sea Fury, Sikorsky H04S, Grumman Sentinel (AEW), Grumman Tracker, McDonnell Douglas Banshee, Sikorsky Sea King)

== MARLANT ships ==
=== Frigates ===
- HMCS Halifax (FFH 330)
- HMCS Ville de Québec (FFH 332)
- HMCS Toronto (FFH 333)
- HMCS Montréal (FFH 336)
- HMCS Fredericton (FFH 337)
- HMCS Charlottetown (FFH 339)
- HMCS St. John's (FFH 340)

=== Arctic offshore patrol vessels ===
- HMCS Harry DeWolf (AOPV 430)
- HMCS Margaret Brooke (AOPV 431)
- HMCS William Hall (AOPV 433)
- HMCS Frédérick Rolette (AOPV 434)

=== Submarines ===
- HMCS Windsor (SSK 877)

== See also ==
- Maritime Forces Pacific
