= Henry Porter (Canadian admiral) =

Royal Canadian Navy admiral (1922–2016)

- Nickname: Harry
- Born: Henry Allan Porter; 17 August 1922; Chemainus, British Columbia
- Died: 13 March 2016 (aged 93) Halifax, Nova Scotia
- Allegiance: Canada
- Branch: Royal Canadian Navy; Canadian Forces
- Service years: 1939–1974
- Rank: Vice-Admiral
- Commands: HMCS Kootenay; HMCS La Hulloise; HMCS Lauzon; Communications School on the East Coast; Fourth Canadian Escort Squadron; HMCS Bonaventure; Maritime Forces Pacific; Maritime Command
- Conflicts: World War II
- Awards: Order of Military Merit; Canadian Forces' Decoration

Vice Admiral Henry Allan Porter CMM, CD (17 August 1922 – 13 March 2016) was a Canadian Forces officer who served as Commander Maritime Command from 6 July 1970 to 18 October 1971.

== Career ==
Porter joined the Royal Canadian Navy as an ordinary telegraphist in 1939 and underwent seamanship training before serving as communications officer in HMCS Kootenay during the Second World War. He became Commanding Officer of the frigate HMCS La Hulloise in 1952, Commanding Officer of the frigate HMCS Lauzon in 1953 and officer in charge of the Communications School on the East Coast in 1954. He went on to be Director of Naval Communications at Naval Headquarters in 1955, Commander Fourth Canadian Escort Squadron in 1958 and Naval Advisor to the Chief of Personnel at the National Defence Headquarters in 1964. After that he became Commanding Officer of the aircraft carrier HMCS Bonaventure in 1965, Director-General Maritime Forces in 1966 and Director-General Equipment Requirements in 1968. He continued his career becoming Senior Canadian Officer Afloat Atlantic in 1968, Commander Maritime Forces Pacific in 1969 and Commander Maritime Command in 1970. His last appointments were as Comptroller General Canadian Armed Forces in 1971 and Assistant Deputy Minister (Evaluation) in 1972 before retiring in 1974. He retired to Chester, Nova Scotia and died on 13 March 2016.

== Awards and decorations ==
Porter's personal awards and decorations include the following:

Ribbon	Description	Notes
	1939–1945 Star	WWII 1939-1945
	Atlantic Star	WWII 1939-1945 with France & Germany Clasp
	Defence Medal (United Kingdom)	WWII 1939-1945
	Canadian Volunteer Service Medal	WWII 1939-1945 with Overseas Service bar
	War Medal 1939–1945	WWII 1939-1945
	Canadian Forces' Decoration (CD)	with two Clasp for 32 years of services

Military offices
Preceded by John O'Brien	Commander Maritime Command; 1970–1971	Succeeded by Robert Timbrell
