= Andrew Collier (admiral) =

- Born: June 3, 1924; Kamloops, British Columbia
- Died: January 3, 1987 (aged 62); Victoria, British Columbia
- Military career
- Allegiance: Canada
- Branch: Royal Canadian Navy; Canadian Forces Maritime Command
- Service years: 1946–1980
- Rank: Vice-Admiral
- Nickname: Andy
- Commands: HMCS Skeena; Seventh Canadian Escort Squadron; Canadian Flotilla (Atlantic); Maritime Forces Pacific; Maritime Command
- Awards: Order of Military Merit; Distinguished Service Cross; Canadian Forces' Decoration

Vice Admiral Andrew Laurence Collier CMM DSC CD (June 3, 1924 – January 3, 1987) was a Canadian Forces officer who served as Commander Maritime Command from 14 June 1977 to 30 June 1979.

== Early years ==
Collier was born in Kamloops and raised in Salmon Arm, where his family was prominent in the grocery business.

== Naval career ==
Collier joined the Royal Canadian Navy in 1942 and completed his training in 1945. He became Commanding Officer of the destroyer HMCS Skeena in 1960, Captain Sea Training on the staff of the Flag Officer Atlantic Coast in 1962 and Director Naval Plans at the National Defence Headquarters in 1964. He went on to be Director International Plans in 1965, Commander Seventh Canadian Escort Squadron in 1966 and Deputy Chief of Staff Maritime Training in 1967. After that he became Deputy Chief of Staff (Combat Readiness) in 1970, Commander Canadian Flotilla (Atlantic) in 1972 and Senior Liaison Officer (Navy) on the Defence Liaison Staff in Washington, D.C. in 1973. His last appointments were as Chief of Maritime Operations in 1974, Commander Maritime Forces Pacific in 1975 and Commander Maritime Command in 1977, in which role he argued for more ships, before retiring in 1979.

== Awards and decorations ==
Collier's personal awards and decorations include the following:

| Ribbon | Description | Notes |
| | Order of Military Merit (CMM) | Appointed Commander (CMM) on 20 June 1977 |
| | Distinguished Service Cross (United Kingdom) (DSC) | Citation for Distinguished Service Cross (DSC) |
| | 1939–1945 Star | WWII 1939-1945 |
| | Atlantic Star | WWII 1939–1945 with France & Germany Clasp |
| | Canadian Volunteer Service Medal | WWII 1939–1945 with Overseas Service bar |
| | War Medal 1939–1945 | WWII 1939-1945 |
| | Korea Medal | 1950-1953 |
| | Canadian Volunteer Service Medal for Korea | |
| | United Nations Service Medal Korea | 1950-1954 |
| | Canadian Centennial Medal | Decoration awarded in 1967 |
| | Queen Elizabeth II Silver Jubilee Medal | Decoration awarded in 1977; Canadian version |
| | Canadian Forces' Decoration (CD) | with two Clasp for 32 years of services |

== Later career ==
He was appointed Commissioner of the Canadian Coast Guard in 1980 and served as president of the British Columbia Ferry Corporation 1984–1987. He died in Victoria.

Military offices
| Preceded by Douglas Boyle | Commander Maritime Command; 1977–1979 | Succeeded by John Allan |
