= Greg Maddison =

Officer of the Canadian Forces

- Born: August 6, 1949 (age 76); Truro, Nova Scotia
- Allegiance: Canada
- Branch: Canadian Forces
- Service years: 1972–2005
- Rank: Vice-Admiral
- Commands: HMCS Athabaskan; First Canadian Destroyer Squadron; Standing Naval Force Atlantic
- Awards: Commander of the Order of Military Merit; Meritorious Service Cross; Canadian Forces' Decoration

Vice-Admiral Gregory Ralph Maddison CMM, MSC, CD (born 6 August 1949) is a retired officer of the Canadian Forces. He was Chief of the Maritime Staff from 24 September 1997 to 21 June 2001.

== Career ==
Maddison joined the Canadian Forces in 1972. He became Commanding Officer of the destroyer HMCS Athabaskan in 1986, Director Maritime Operations Plans and Reserves in 1989 and Commander of the First Canadian Destroyer Squadron in 1991. He went on to be Commander of NATO's Standing Naval Force Atlantic in 1993, Assistant Chief of Staff (Personnel & Training) in 1994 and Chief of the Maritime Staff in September 1997. His last appointment was as Deputy Chief of the Defence Staff in May 2001 before retiring in 2005.

== Awards and decorations ==
Maddison's personal awards and decorations include the following:

| Ribbon | Description | Notes |
| | Order of Military Merit (CMM) | Appointed Commander (CMM) on 22 September 1997; Appointed Officer (OMM) on 18 June 1984 |
| | Meritorious Service Cross (MSC) | Decoration awarded on 10 March 1995; Military division; Citation for Meritorious Service Cross – MSC, |
| | Special Service Medal | with NATO-OTAN Clasp |
| | Canadian Peacekeeping Service Medal | |
| | NATO Medal for the former Yugoslavia | with FORMER YUGOSLAVIA clasp |
| | Queen Elizabeth II Silver Jubilee Medal | Decoration awarded in 1977; Canadian version |
| | Queen Elizabeth II Golden Jubilee Medal | Decoration awarded 2002; Canadian version |
| | Canadian Forces' Decoration (CD) | with two Clasp for 32 years of services |

Military offices
| Preceded by Gary Garnett | Chief of the Maritime Staff; 1997–2001 | Succeeded by Ronald Buck |
