= HMCS Bonaventure =

Majestic-class aircraft carrier of the Canadian Navy

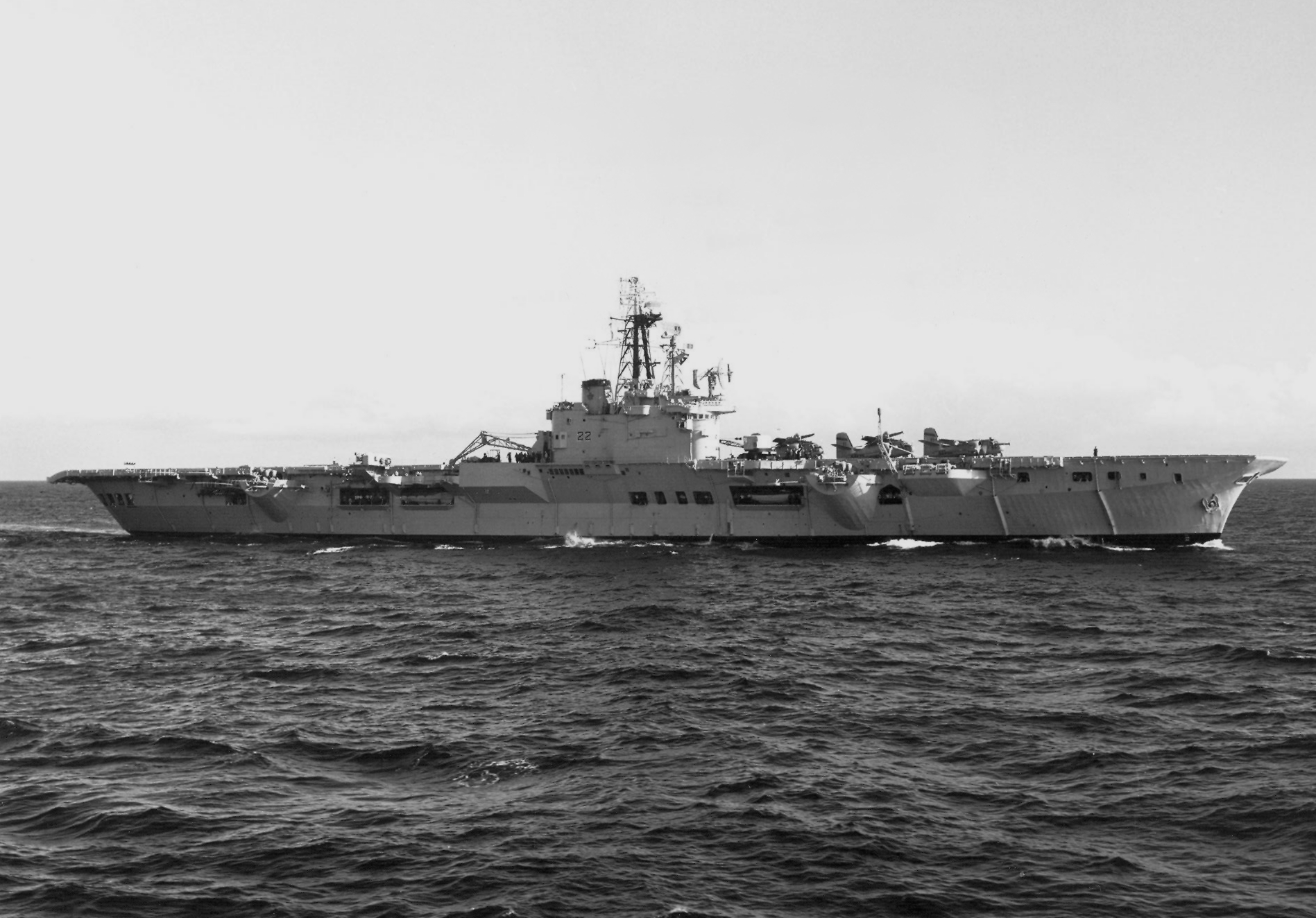
- HMCS Bonaventure in 1961

History

Canada
- Name: Bonaventure
- Namesake: Bonaventure Island
- Builder: Harland & Wolff, Belfast, Northern Ireland
- Laid down: 27 November 1943
- Launched: 27 February 1945
- Acquired: 23 April 1952
- Commissioned: 17 January 1957
- Decommissioned: 3 July 1970
- Home port: Halifax, Nova Scotia
- Motto: Nos toz seus (Not for us alone)
- Nickname(s): "Bonnie"
- Fate: Broken up in Taiwan 1971
- Badge: On a field barry wavy of ten argent and azure a horseshoe with base or in which a wyvern wings displayed gules gorged with a coronet of Canada

General characteristics
- Class & type: Majestic-class aircraft carrier
- Displacement: normal: 16,000 long tons (16,257 t); full load: 20,000 long tons (20,321 t)
- Length: waterline: 629.9 ft (192.0 m); flight deck: 704 ft (215 m)
- Beam: 80 ft (24.384 m); deck width: 112.5 ft (34.3 m)
- Draught: 24.5 ft (7.5 m)
- Propulsion: Parsons single-reduction geared steam turbines, four Admiralty 3-drum type 350 psi (2,400 kPa) boilers, two shafts; 40,000 hp (30,000 kW)
- Speed: 24.5 knots (45.4 km/h; 28.2 mph)
- Complement: 1,200 (1,370 war)
- Sensors & processing systems: AN/SPS-10 surface search; AN/SPS-12 air search (Note: Replaced during 1967 refit with AN/SPS-501 air search radar.); AN/SPS-8 height finder
- Armament: 4 × 3 in (76 mm)/50-calibre twin-mounted guns (Note: Reduced to two during 1967 refit.); 8 × Bofors 40 mm guns
- Aircraft carried: 34 including 16 × McDonnell F2H-3 Banshee jet fighters (Note: Retired in 1962); Grummann CS2F Tracker ASW; Sikorsky HO4S ASW helicopters; Sikorsky CHSS-2 Sea King ASW helicopter (Note: Introduced in 1964.)

HMCS Bonaventure was a Majestic-class aircraft carrier, the third and last aircraft carrier in service with the Royal Canadian Navy. The aircraft carrier was initially ordered for construction by Britain's Royal Navy as HMS Powerful during the Second World War. Following the end of the war, construction on the ship was halted and it was not until 1952 that work resumed again, this time to an altered design for the Royal Canadian Navy. The ship entered service in 1957 renamed Bonaventure and, until the vessel's decommissioning in 1970, was involved in major NATO fleet-at-sea patrols and naval exercises and participated in the Cuban Missile Crisis. During her career Bonaventure carried three hull identification numbers, RML 22, RRSM 22 and CVL 22. Following her decommissioning Bonaventure was sold for scrap and broken up in Taiwan.

== Description ==
Initially laid down as HMS Powerful as part of the second batch of the Colossus class during the Second World War, the vessel's construction was halted following the end of the war and the constructed hull was laid up. Powerful was purchased by the Royal Canadian Navy in 1952 and the hull was taken to the Harland & Wolff shipyard in Belfast, Northern Ireland, to be completed to a modernized design of the Majestic subclass. The ship measured 704 feet (214.6 m) long overall with a maximum beam of 128 feet (39 m) and a draught of 25 feet (7.6 m). The vessel had a standard displacement of 16,000 long tons (16,257 t) and 20,000 long tons (20,321 t) at full load. Bonaventure was propelled by two geared steam turbines driving two shafts powered by steam from four Admiralty three-drum boilers rated at 40,000 shaft horsepower (30,000 kW). The steam pressure of the engines were rated at 300 lbf/in^{2} (2,100 kPa; 21 kgf/cm^{2}). The aircraft carrier had a maximum speed of 24.5 knots (45.4 km/h; 28.2 mph) and carried 3,200 long tons (3,251 t) of fuel oil.

The ship had a complement of 1,370 officers and ratings. For additional protection to the magazines, mantlets were placed over them. The aircraft carrier was armed with four twin-mounted 3-inch (76 mm)/50-calibre Mk 33 guns and four single 3-pounder (1.4 kg) saluting guns. The American 3-inch/50-calibre guns were chosen over 40 mm guns. Bonaventure had a distinct appearance compared to her sister ships as she had a tall lattice mast, raked funnel and large sponson where the 3-inch guns were situated. Adding to her distinct appearance, was that Bonaventure was completed with United States Navy radar, specifically the SPS-8A height finder and the SPS-12 air search radar.

=== Aircraft ===
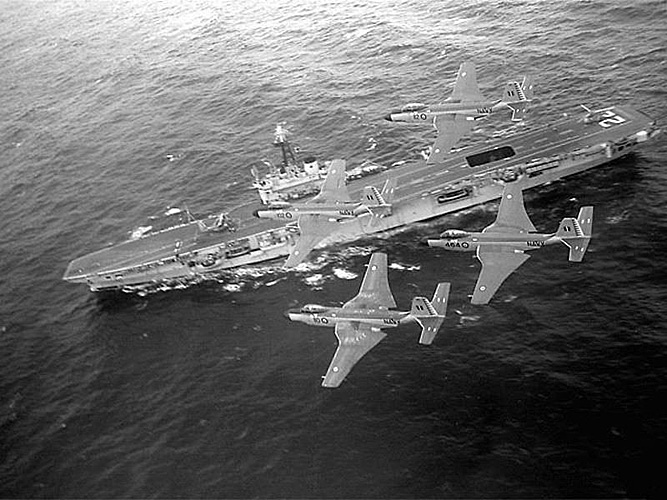
Banshees overflying Bonaventure in the late 1950s

As part of the modernized design, Bonaventure was equipped with three relatively new technologies in relation to her air complement. The Majestic subclass' design allowed for heavier aircraft, those up to 20,000 pounds (9,100 kg) landing at 87 knots (161 km/h; 100 mph), to be launched and recovered. Bonaventure improved on that limit, able to land aircraft of up to 24,000 pounds (11,000 kg). The aircraft lifts were enlarged to 54 by 34 feet (16 m × 10 m) in order to accommodate larger aircraft. The new design also incorporated an angled flight deck, steam catapults, and optical landing system. The angled flight deck increased the carrier's landing area without limiting space for aircraft parking and allowed for the removal of antiquated crash barriers.

During her service life, Bonaventure carried five squadrons. The aircraft carrier's initial air group was composed of sixteen McDonnell F2H Banshee jet fighters and eight Grumman CS2F Tracker anti-submarine warfare (ASW) aircraft. The Banshee, flown by VF 870 and VF 871, and Tracker, operated by VS 880 and VS 881, were flown from Bonaventure, along with Sikorsky HO4S ASW helicopters operated by HS 50.

The Banshees were a tight fit, with Bonaventure barely able to accommodate them. The Trackers did not become fully operational aboard until 1959. Despite this, Bonaventure conducted sustained around-the-clock operations, keeping four Trackers and two HO4Ss in the air at all times, while monitoring an area of 200 square nautical miles (690 km^{2}). The HO4Ss were equipped with dipping sonar and, beginning in 1958, Mark 43 torpedoes. The Banshees were retired in 1962 but were not replaced. The ship's role then changed to one of pure ASW and the air wing was modified, dropping the fighters but keeping the eight Trackers, and increasing the number of HO4Ss to fourteen. In 1963, the aircraft carrier began a refit in order to allow her operate the new Sikorsky CHSS-2 Sea King helicopters, which had been ordered to replace the HO4Ss. When Bonaventure was retired, her former aircraft continued to operate from shore installations, including CFB Shearwater.

== History ==
=== Construction and acquisition ===
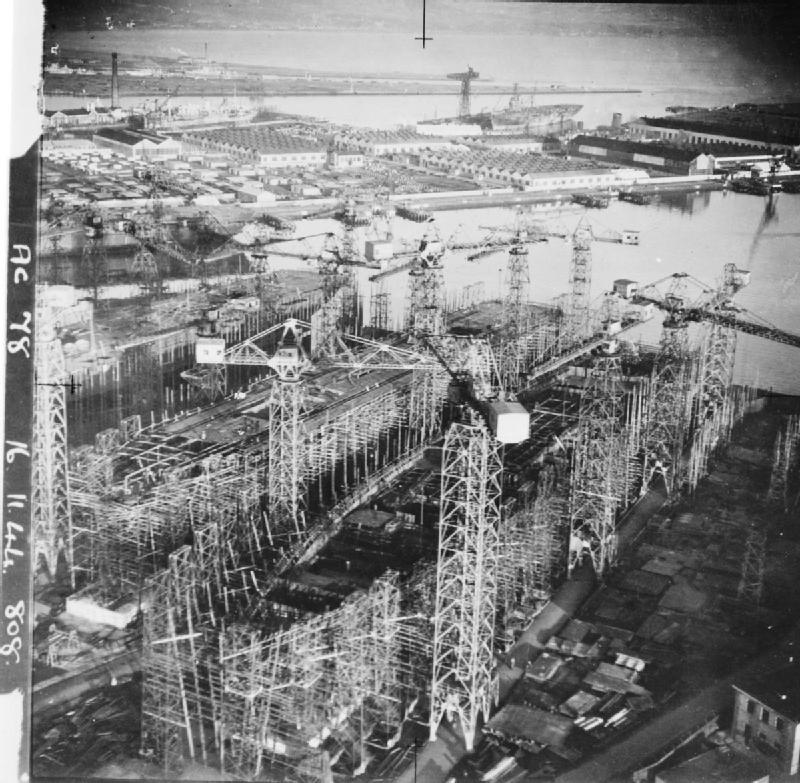
HMS Powerful (right) under construction in Belfast in 1944; HMS Magnificent is on the adjacent slipway

The British government ordered a second hull constructed of what would become the Majestic class on 16 October 1942 once a dock opened at Harland & Wolff's shipyard in Belfast, Northern Ireland. The aircraft carrier's keel was laid down on 21 November 1943 with the yard number 1229 and the British Admiralty chose the name Powerful for the ship. Powerful was launched on 27 February 1945. Work was suspended in May 1946 following the end of the Second World War, and the hull was laid up incomplete at Belfast.

In 1952, the Royal Canadian Navy was looking to replace their existing aircraft carrier HMCS Magnificent. On 23 April, the Canadian government authorized the expenditure of $21 million (Note: equivalent to $246 million in 2025) to acquire Powerful. The Royal Canadian Navy had also been offered a Hermes-class aircraft carrier by the United Kingdom but found it too costly and two Essex-class aircraft carriers on loan from the United States Navy, also considered too costly. The choice of Powerful was made due to cost considerations as well as financial support for the United Kingdom. Agreement on the purchase of Powerful was reached on 29 November but was back-dated to 12 July. Work on Powerful resumed, this time to a modernized design incorporating recent carrier operation developments, such as the angled flight deck and steam catapults. The design changes cost a further $10 million. Other changes that were incorporated were American radar and armament. Construction was completed on 17 January 1957, and the vessel was commissioned into the Royal Canadian Navy at Belfast as HMCS Bonaventure. The vessel was christened by the wife of the Canadian Minister of National Defence, Ralph Campney.

=== Early service ===
Bonaventure was named for Bonaventure Island, a bird sanctuary in the Gulf of St. Lawrence and was the first aircraft carrier owned outright by Canada, initially tasked with trade protection. In March 1957, the aircraft carrier began trials in the English Channel with her aircraft. Bonaventure sailed for Canada on 19 June and arrived at her home port, Halifax, Nova Scotia, on 26 June, carrying the experimental hydrofoil Bras d'Or to Canada on her flight deck. In October, the aircraft carrier began further trials with her air group composed of VF 870 (Banshee), VS 881 (Tracker) and one HO4S helicopter in the Caribbean Sea that lasted until early 1958. This included cross-deck operations with the Royal Navy aircraft carrier HMS Bulwark. On 2 October, a Banshee fighter flying from Bonaventure to the naval air base HMCS Shearwater was lost at sea. The resulting search did not find the plane or the pilot. Captain William Landymore became the ship's senior officer on 15 January 1958. On 25 February 1958, a Banshee crashed into the sea after takeoff and the pilot was killed. On 4 March, a Banshee suffered another fatal crash, as the aircraft made a normal deck landing, an apparent brake failure caused the fighter to flip over the port side of the aircraft carrier, killing the pilot. Later in the year, Bonaventure participated in the naval exercises New Broom IX and Sharp Squall IV. During Sharp Squall IV a Banshee was lost off the bow of the ship during takeoff. This time, the pilot was recovered by the destroyer HMCS Athabaskan. In November 1958, while operating off the Grand Banks of Newfoundland, Bonaventure and her escorts made contact with a Soviet Navy submarine while patrolling around a group of Russian fishing trawlers. The aircraft carrier ended the year with a visit to the United Kingdom before going into refit at Saint John, New Brunswick. On 12 September 1959, Captain John O'Brien took command of the ship.

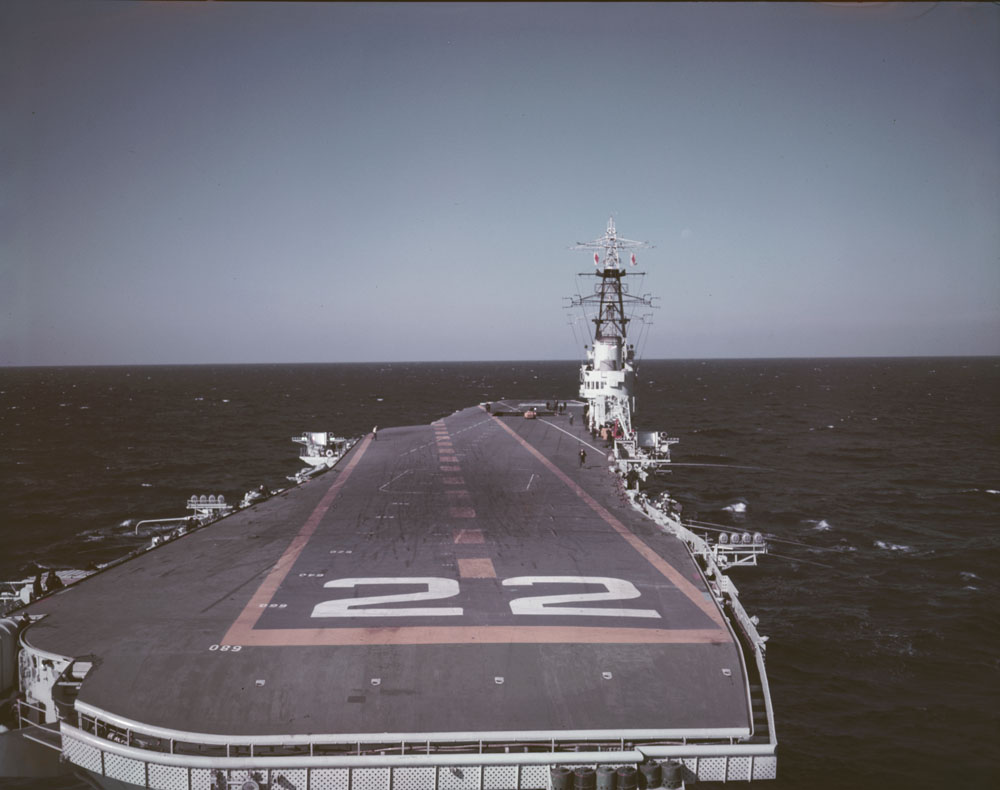
HMCS Bonaventure from the stern, photo taken in October 1957

In 1960, NATO reorganized their defence of the North Atlantic and the Canadian contribution to the new plan centred around an ASW hunter-killer group led by Bonaventure. The aircraft carrier rejoined the fleet in November 1960, embarking VF 870 (Banshee), VS 880 (Tracker) and HS 50 (HO4S) squadrons. Beginning in February 1961, Bonaventure took part in the naval exercise Toput Droit, followed by a period spent training with the United States Atlantic Fleet in the summer and further naval exercises in October. Captain F. C. Frewer took over command of the ship on 30 August 1961. In April 1962, Bonaventure had her 10,000th deck landing by an aircraft (a Tracker). On 30 September 1962, Canada withdrew the Banshee fleet and Bonaventure's mission changed to a purely anti-submarine warfare one. The air group was then composed solely of VS 880 and HS 50 squadrons.

On 13 October 1962, at the onset of the Cuban Missile Crisis, Bonaventure and the 1st Canadian Escort Squadron were sailing through United Kingdom territorial waters. As the crisis deepened, Bonaventure and her escorts were recalled to Canada. The ship returned to her homeport following the crisis and, in January 1963, began a refit at Saint John. During the refit, the ship was modified for the operation of the Sea King helicopters. The aircraft carrier rejoined the fleet in May, but suffered a boiler explosion while in port at Halifax. Repairs took six weeks to complete. On 7 August, Captain Robert Timbrell took command of the vessel. That year Bonaventure took part in the Sharp Squall naval exercise and in September, participated in testing ASW defences in the Greenland-Iceland gap. That was followed by cross-deck operations with the aircraft carrier HNLMS Karel Doorman.

=== Mid-life refit and fate ===
The 1964 Navy estimates called for the major refit of Bonaventure in order to extend the aircraft carrier's service life. While the Canadian Naval Board planned the carrier's upcoming refit, Bonaventure participated in the naval exercise Gooey Duck which included training off Bermuda in January and in February, sailed to the Mediterranean Sea. While there, Bonaventure was recalled to Canada to embark troops from the Canadian Royal 22nd Regiment for service in a United Nations peacekeeping venture. Called Operation Snow Goose, 95 soldiers, 54 vehicles and 400 tons of stores were loaded aboard the aircraft carrier and the ship disembarked them at Famagusta, Cyprus on 30 March. Bonaventure then returned to Canada before sailing to Norfolk, Virginia, for trials with the A-4 Skyhawk, a possible replacement for the Banshee. However, due to financial considerations, the Skyhawk was not purchased. In December, Bonaventure began sea trials with the Sea King helicopter.

In January 1965, Bonaventure's air group was composed of VS 880 (Tracker), HS 50 (Sea King), an HO4S plane guard from HU 21 squadron and a COD Tracker from VU 32 squadron. From February to March 1965, Bonaventure took part in naval exercises and in May, visited the United Kingdom. On 2 April 1965, Captain Henry Porter became the commanding officer of the aircraft carrier. In June, Bonaventure visited the Joint Anti-Submarine School at Londonderry and took part in joint operations in the Southwest Approaches with HMS Ark Royal and HNLMS Karel Doorman. The following year in January, Bonaventure, along with six escorts, took part in the largest Canadian naval activity in the Caribbean Sea and South American waters. During the exercise, the ship visited Rio de Janeiro in February and in March, returned to Halifax.

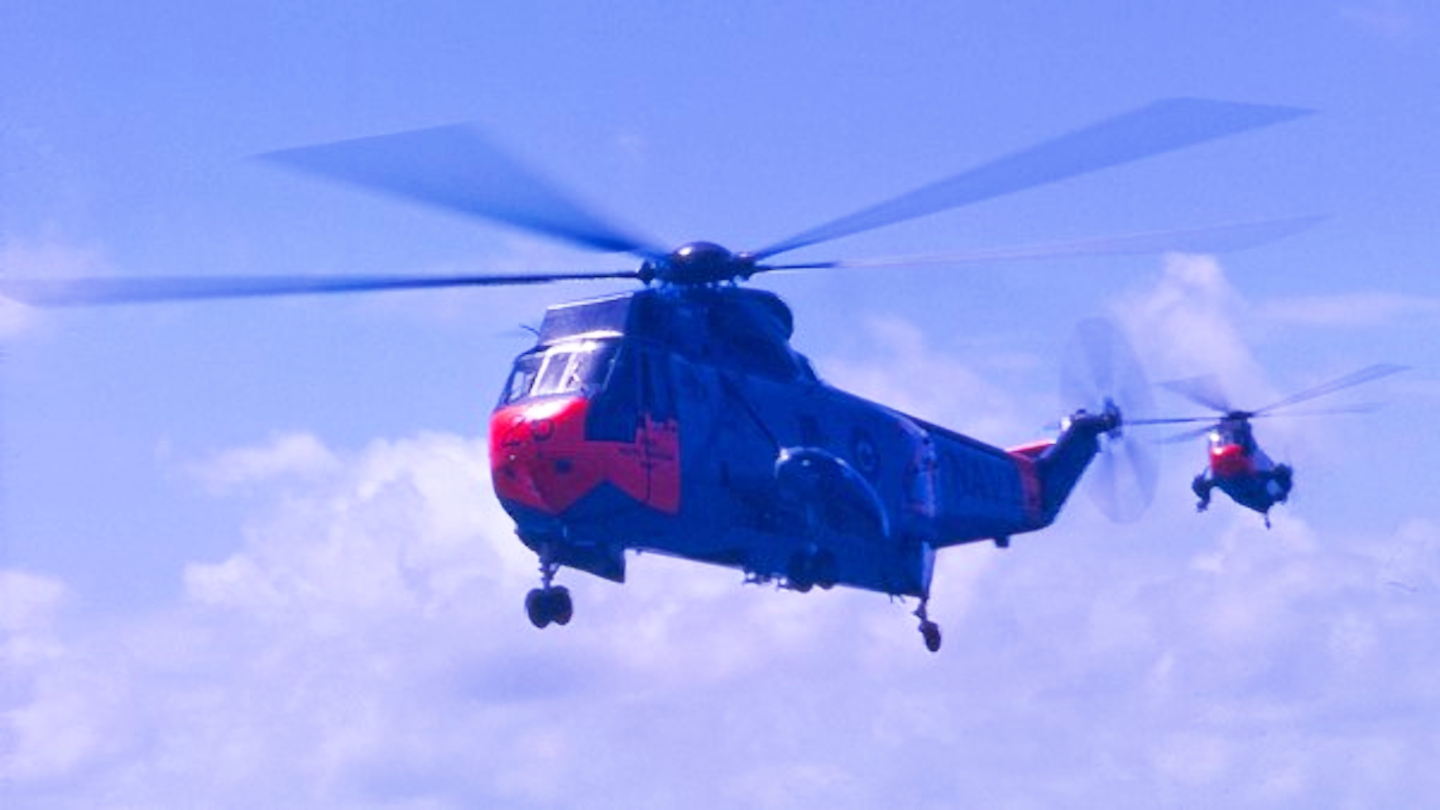
Two CH-124 Sea Kings approach Bonaventure in February 1968

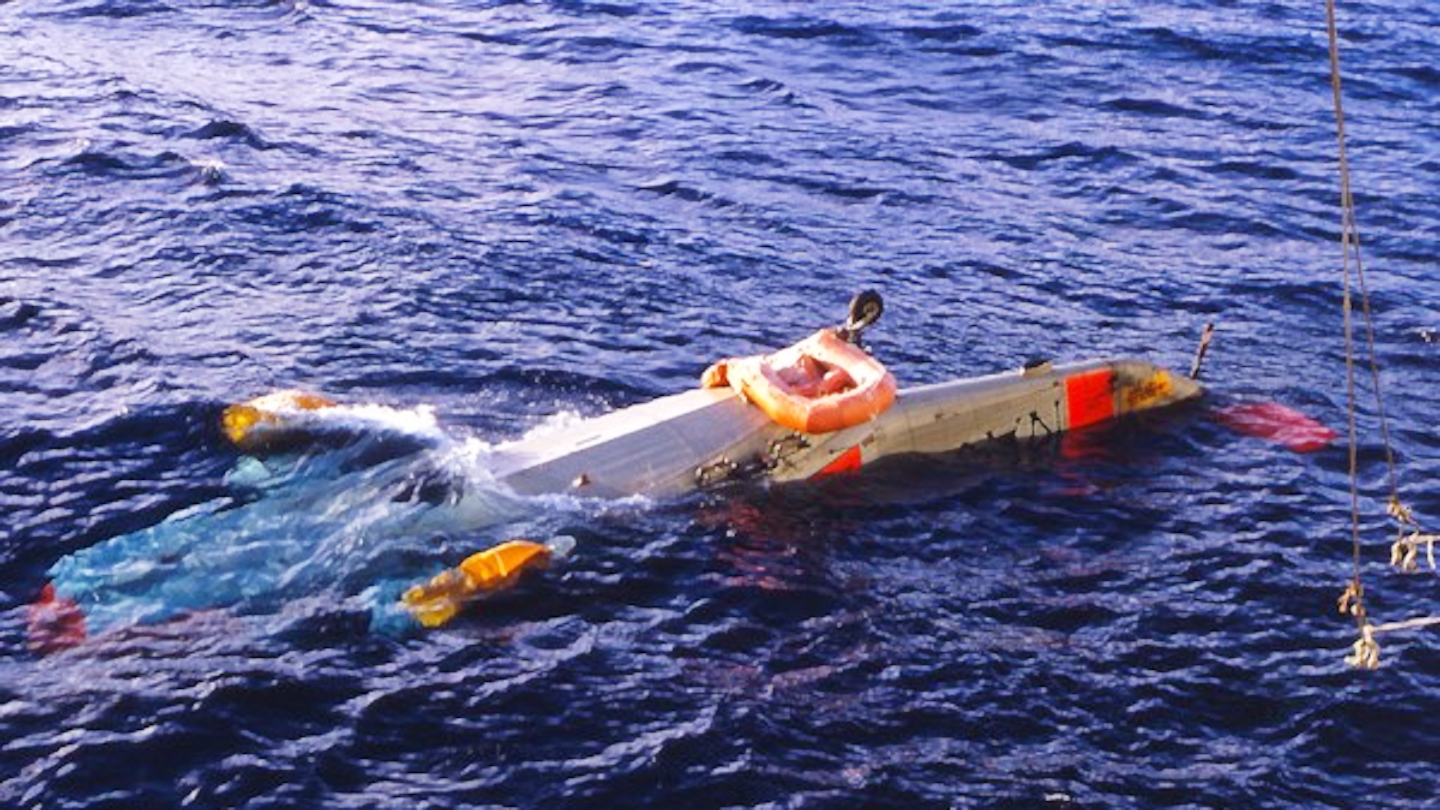
A downed Sea King in February 1968 (Note: Sea King 4027 was downed due to engine failure with no casualties. The aircraft was recovered but not returned to service due to saltwater damage.)

Beginning in April 1966, the carrier began a mid-life refit at Davie Shipbuilding in Lauzon, Quebec. The initial estimate for the refit was $8 million. However, during the refit, numerous issues with the ship, which had been present since construction, were found and led to cost overruns and delays. In the end, the refit took 18 months and cost $17 million, both behind schedule and well over budget. The refit was complete in August 1967. During her refit, Captain A. T. Brice became the ship's commanding officer on 1 August 1966. Bonaventure rejoined the fleet in November 1967 with a new commanding officer, Captain R. H. Falls, who had taken command on 21 November 1966.

Following the 1968 Unification of the Canadian Forces, the Royal Canadian Navy ceased to exist and Bonaventure and naval aviation were merged with the rest of the Canadian Armed Forces, with naval aviation no longer under the jurisdiction of the navy. In February 1968, Bonaventure took part in a naval exercise in which a Sea King ditched into the sea. The crew were recovered alive and the helicopter was salvaged. In March, the ship visited New Orleans, Louisiana, before spending the next two months in military exercises. 1969 was spent training with the United States Navy and participating in the naval exercise Peace Keeper off Ireland. On 9 April 1969, Captain J. M. Cutts became the senior officer aboard the aircraft carrier. Bonaventure visited Portsmouth before sailing to Canada on 22 October 1969. As the Canadian military sought to cut spending, Bonaventure was deemed surplus and the last night deck landing took place on 28 October, followed by a visit to Boston, Massachusetts, before the last deck landing aboard Bonaventure took place on 12 December 1969.

A few last missions were left for Bonaventure. On 9 January 1970, Captain H. W. Vondette became the final commanding officer of Bonaventure. In January 1970, the aircraft carrier (minus her aircraft) was sent to carry troops of the Royal 22nd Regiment to Jamaica for training exercises. In February, Bonaventure was used as a replenishment oiler to replenish the fuel stores of frigates taking part in the Exercise Maple Spring. During this operation, Bonaventure had six Sea Kings of HS 50 aboard. In April the ship was sent to recover Canadian forces from Narvik, Norway, after a military exercise and made a final visit to Portsmouth on the way back to Canada.

Bonaventure was decommissioned at HMC Dockyard in Halifax on 3 July 1970, and sold for disposal. During the component recovery process, parts from Bonaventure's steam catapult were used to undertake repairs to the catapult of her sister ship, HMAS Melbourne of the Royal Australian Navy. The vessel was purchased by Tung Chen S Steel Company of Taiwan for scrap and broken up in 1971.

== Commemoration ==
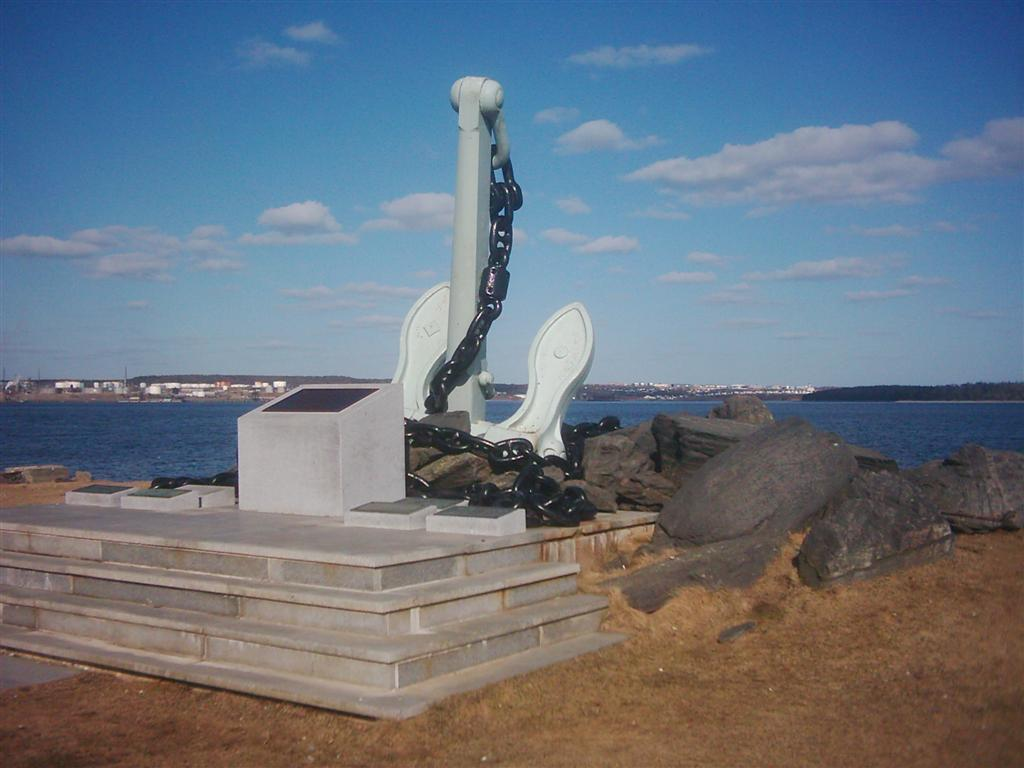
Bonaventure's anchor, Point Pleasant Park, Halifax, Nova Scotia

Bonaventure had two ships' anchors. One anchor is preserved at Point Pleasant Park in Halifax as the Bonaventure Anchor Memorial. The monument was dedicated in 1973 initially to aircrew lost at sea, but later to all naval personnel who died in service. The monument consists of the anchor and chains, along with a small chain running from the monument into the water to make the connection between the monument and the sea. The anchor faces the mouth of the harbour. The names of navy and air force personnel who died during peacetime are etched into plaques beside the anchor. Her starboard anchor, donated by Maritime Command on 6 May 1998, is on display at Royal Military College Saint-Jean. Her two saluting guns are mounted at HMCS Discovery in Vancouver's Stanley Park. The ship's bell is preserved at the Shearwater Aviation Museum in Dartmouth, Nova Scotia, which also hosts a large model and exhibit about the carrier.

== Bibliography ==
- Arbuckle, J. Graeme (1987). Badges of the Canadian Navy. Halifax, Nova Scotia: Nimbus Publishing. ISBN 0-920852-49-1.
- Beaver, Paul (1982). The British Aircraft Carrier. Cambridge, UK: Patrick Stephens. ISBN 0-85059-493-6.
- Blackman, Raymond V. B., ed. (1953). Jane's Fighting Ships 1953–54. London: Sampson, Low and Marston. OCLC 913556389.
- Boutiller, James A., ed. (1982). RCN in Retrospect, 1910–1968. Vancouver: University of British Columbia Press. ISBN 0-7748-0196-4.
- Brown, David K.; Moore, George (2012). Rebuilding the Royal Navy: Warship Design since 1945. Barnsley, United Kingdom: Seaforth Publishing. ISBN 978-184832-150-2.
- Gardiner, Robert; Chumbley, Stephen; Budzbon, Przemysław, eds. (1995). Conway's All the World's Fighting Ships 1947–1995. Annapolis, Maryland: Naval Institute Press. ISBN 1-55750-132-7.
- Hall, Timothy (1982). HMAS Melbourne. North Sydney, NSW: George Allen & Unwin. ISBN 0-86861-284-7. OCLC 9753221.
- Hobbs, David (2013). British Aircraft Carriers: Design, Development and Service Histories. Barnsley, UK: Seaforth Publishing. ISBN 978-1-84832-138-0.
- Kealy, J. D. F.; Russell, E. C. (1967). A History of Canadian Naval Aviation 1918–1962. Ottawa: Queen's Printer. OCLC 460555.
- Macpherson, Ken; Barrie, Ron (2002). The Ships of Canada's Naval Forces 1910–2002 (Third ed.). St. Catharines, Ontario: Vanwell Publishing. ISBN 1-55125-072-1.
- Milner, Marc (2010). Canada's Navy: The First Century (Second ed.). Toronto: University of Toronto Press. ISBN 978-0-8020-9604-3.
- Tracy, Nicholas (2012). A Two-Edged Sword: The Navy as an Instrument of Canadian Foreign Policy. Montreal, Quebec and Kingston, Ontario: McGill-Queens University Press. ISBN 978-0-7735-4051-4.
