= Canadian Volunteer Service Medal =

Canadian military campaign medal for service in the Second World War

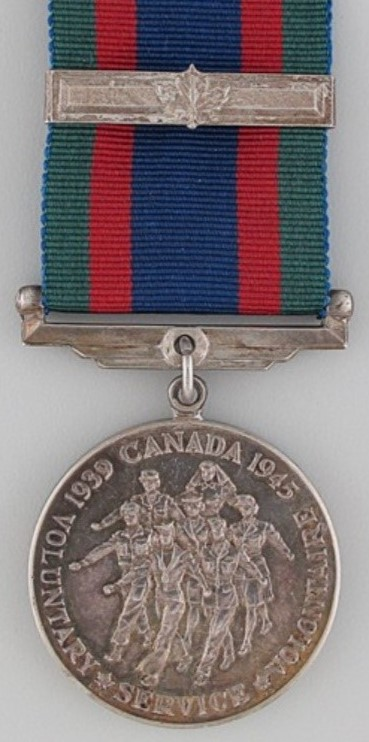
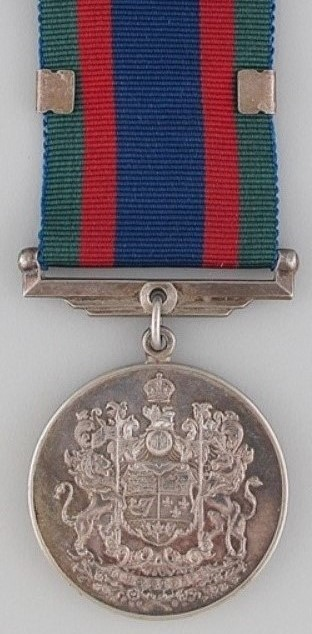
- Obverse and reverse with overseas service bar
- Presented by: Canada
- Eligibility: 18 Months of voluntary service
- Campaign: World War II
- Clasps: Maple leaf for Overseas Service; Hong Kong; Dieppe; Bomber Command
- Established: October 22, 1943

Highlights
- Total: 650,000 medals 525,000 bars.
- Ribbon bar Ribbon bar with silver maple leaf, denoting Overseas Service bar

Precedence
- Next (higher): Defence Medal
- Equivalent: Newfoundland Volunteer War Service Medal
- Next (lower): War Medal

The Canadian Volunteer Service Medal is granted to persons of any rank in the Naval, Military or Air Forces of Canada who voluntarily served on Active Service from September 3, 1939, to March 1, 1947. The medal was established on October 22, 1943.

== Criteria ==
Members of the Naval, Military or Air Forces of Canada are eligible for this medal if they voluntarily served on Active Service and honourably completed eighteen months (540 days) total service from September 3, 1939, to March 1, 1947.

On March 14, 2001, the Governor General extended the eligibility to individuals who served, but not as members of the military forces. Those granted eligibility were Canadian World War II merchant mariners; Auxiliary Services personnel, engaged and paid by the Canadian Legion, Knights of Columbus, Salvation Army and the YMCA; The Corps of Canadian (Civilian) Fire Fighters who served in the United Kingdom and helped fight the fires during the Blitz; Overseas Welfare Workers and the Voluntary Aid Detachments; Ferry Command pilots and aircrew under contract to deliver aircraft from North America; and British Commonwealth Air Training Plan Instructors.

On June 6, 2003, eligibility was extended to members and reserve constables of the Royal Canadian Mounted Police who voluntarily served during the Second World War.

The Canadian Volunteer Service Medal was awarded in addition to the standard British Commonwealth campaign awards for World War II, being worn after the Defence Medal and before the War Medal.

== Description ==
The medal is circular, made of silver (.925 fine silver), 1.42 inches (36 mm) in diameter. The obverse depicts seven marching figures, representing men and women of the army, air force, navy and nursing service. Around the rim is the inscription 1939 CANADA 1945 VOLUNTARY SERVICE VOLONTAIRE. The seven marching figures were based on real people taken from the National Defence photographs. The reverse shows the coat of arms of Canada. Medals were issued unnamed.

The medal is linked to a straight suspender by a small ring passing through a small fixed ring at the top of the medal. It is suspended from a 1.25 inches (32 mm) wide with a royal blue centre 0.5 inches (13 mm) flanked by two equal stripes of scarlet and dark green, the dark green being on the edges. The ribbon was issued during the war; the medal after the war.

The medal was designed by the war artist Major Charles Comfort.

== Bars ==
=== Overseas Bar ===
A silver bar with a maple leaf at its centre is awarded for 60 days service outside Canada; Newfoundland counted as outside Canada. A silver maple leaf is worn on the ribbon in undress. This bar was instituted in October 1943, at the same time as the medal.

=== Dieppe Bar ===
The Dieppe Bar, instituted in April 1994, is awarded to those who participated in the Dieppe Raid on August 19, 1942. The bar bears the word Dieppe in relief on a pebbled background, below the Combined Operations emblem – an anchor surmounted by an eagle and a Thompson sub-machine gun.

=== Hong Kong Bar ===
The Hong Kong Bar, instituted in April 1994, is awarded to those involved in the Battle of Hong Kong during the period of December 8–25, 1941. Two Canadian battalions, totalling 1,982 men, were present in Hong Kong and took part in the battle.

=== Bomber Command Bar ===
The Bomber Command Bar, awarded for minimum one day service with Bomber Command during World War II, was announced by Minister of Veterans Affairs Steven Blaney and National Defence Minister Peter MacKay on June 25, 2012. On April 15, 2013, the design of the bar was unveiled. It is silver and depicts a four-engined Second World War–era bomber in the centre, superimposed on a pebbled background. The first bars were presented on August 26, 2013, by Minister of Veterans Affairs Julian Fantino in a ceremony at the Canadian Forces College in Toronto. Bomber Command Veterans, their families, and families of deceased veterans entitled to the bar were in attendance.

== Issued ==
A total of 650,000 medals were awarded, of which 525,500 had the Overseas Service bar.
