= Origins of the Royal Canadian Navy =

At the onset of Confederation in 1867, political planners in Canada and Great Britain realized that Canada had substantial maritime interests to protect. Boasting the fourth largest Merchant Marine in the world, and deriving the majority of its foreign capital through maritime trading should have been enough to persuade the Canadian government of the strategic importance of the seas. Adding the fact that Canada was one of the great shipbuilding and ship-owning countries of the world, and it soon made the need for maritime protection obvious.

For Britain's Royal Navy, the Canadian merchant fleet represented a ready supply of vessels that could have been converted to auxiliary warships, with some help to procure the necessary armament should a crisis arise. Soon enough, though, sail gave way to steam, and Canada's mercantile fleet became inadequate to complement the British Navy. The British Parliament had passed the Colonial Naval Defence Act 1865, which enabled colonies to establish and maintain naval forces for foreign defence in the European theatre. Canada's maritime interests needed to be safeguarded, and Britain wanted Canada to assume its fair share.

== First tentative steps ==
In 1878, Governor General Lord Dufferin stated in a dispatch to the Colonial Secretary (likely Michael Hicks Beach, 1st Earl St Aldwyn) that the government of Prime Minister John A. Macdonald 'would not be adverse to instituting a ship for training purposes if the Imperial Government would provide the ship'. Thus began the first attempt to start a Canadian Navy with the allocation of the old wooden steam-auxiliary corvette HMS Charybdis in July 1881. This ship, acquired with the intent to train a Marine Militia provided for in the Militia Act of 1868, achieved notoriety when she broke her moorings in Saint John harbour and caused severe damage to the merchant vessels anchored in proximity. Her poor condition was also responsible for the death of two civilians who drowned in the harbour after falling through her rotten gangway.

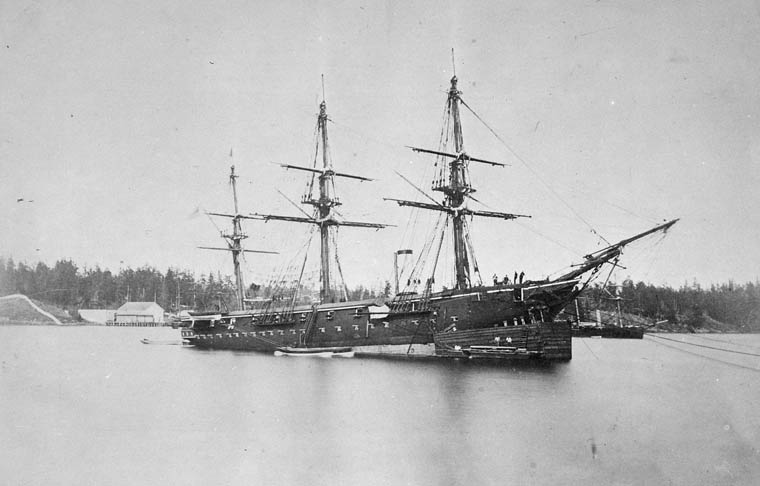
HMS Charybdis, commissioned by Marine and Fisheries in 1881, was Macdonald's attempt at the formation of a Canadian naval service.

As a result of the War of 1812 and the American War for Independence in 1775, the defensive focus in Canada was focused on the land forces and leaving the naval service to Britain. This made naval service less of a priority for the Dominion. Charybdis was the product of a shift in domestic policy stemming from a host of grievances the young Dominion of Canada had towards the British Empire's handling of its foreign affairs. The United States still represented Canada's surest enemy in the late 19th century, but Britain's attitude became more frequently one of laissez-faire towards that fast emerging economic and military giant. Canada often felt cheated when, militarily still dependent on the Empire, it failed to see conflicts resolved to satisfaction. One example was the imperial government's unwillingness to apprehend and prosecute American poachers contravening the fisheries articles of the Anglo-American Treaty of Washington of 1871, and risk a quarrel with the US on behalf of the Dominion.

Another event that led to the acquisition of the training vessel was the looming crisis between Britain and the Russian Empire over the Russo-Turkish War of 1877–78. That predicament, which caused Britain to re-distribute its naval assets, demonstrated the relative vulnerability of Canada's Atlantic seaboard. Although this crisis was soon averted with the signing of the Treaty of Berlin, Canada still held on to the idea of making preparations for naval defence. Public opinion of Charybdis in the 1 1/2 years of her service to Canada labelled her a white elephant, with the population wondering what her purpose would be. The MP for Huron South Malcolm Colin Cameron made a motion in the House of Commons that she must be returned to the Royal Navy, an unfortunate solution that soon ensued. That this first attempt at building a Canadian Navy ended in a fiasco did not terribly bother the British one; the official position was that the Imperial Fleet should be as indivisible as the seas themselves.

== Birth of the Canadian Navy ==
Since the British conquest of New France in 1763 and the establishment of the other colonies that would eventually form the Dominion of Canada, Britain and its taxpayers had assumed sole financial responsibility for the defence of the colonies. This was never debated since Canada and the other British colonies afforded Britain with secure supplies of natural resources and ready markets for finished products. The extent to which Britain was dependent on foreign trade for its survival is thus illustrated:

...as late as the 1830s over 90% of the food consumed was also grown in Britain, but by 1913 55% of the grain and 40% of the meat consumed was imported. In raw materials the dependence was even more marked: seven-eighths of these came from abroad by 1913.

At the turn of the twentieth century, the rise of the Imperial German Navy under Kaiser Wilhelm II threatened to challenge Britain for supremacy of all maritime trade routes. Britain, feeling pressure to modernize and expand its already considerable fleet, asked that the former colonies assume a larger responsibility for the defence of the empire. The preferred choice of the Imperial government for the protection of the empire was the maintenance of a common military system, sustained by direct financial contributions from the former colonies. In return, the British Admiralty would be left responsible to defend Canada's coasts.

The Liberal cabinet of Prime Minister Sir Wilfrid Laurier had other plans in mind. At the Imperial Conference of 1902, Laurier refused direct contributions to the maintenance of the British fleet, and instead pushed for the development of a local navy under the Department of Marine and Fisheries. It was felt that Canadians providing the defence of their homeland was a more ambitious plan, and would directly contribute toward the collective security of the Empire. A strong sentiment of the day stated that Canada had no business sending soldiers for the Empire when it had no voice in imperial decisions.

When the British government announced in 1904 its intentions to abandon the Halifax and Esquimalt Dockyards by 1906, Laurier saw another compelling reason for the formation of Canada's naval service. The Dominion had the opportunity to avail itself of an existing infrastructure towards the maintenance of its own fleet. Strong feelings of discontent towards Britain were also felt because of the resolution of the Alaska boundary dispute, which saw Britain's representative side with the United States in 1903. A precedent was set in 1906 when Australia received grudging approval to raise its own navy, although Britain still viewed the burgeoning Royal Australian Navy (RAN) as a local squadron of its own force.

== Beginning ==
In order to assert Canadian territorial sovereignty and curb American illegal fishing in territorial waters, the government had reactivated the Fisheries Protection Service in 1886. This was established under the auspices of the Department of Marine and Fisheries. The largest federal department by 1902, it was responsible for all affairs maritime from regulations to arctic sovereignty. The department had acquired since 1891 a force of eight armed cruisers, six icebreakers, and nearly twenty other vessels. The Fisheries Protection Service, were it militarised, would present a substantial start to a new national naval service. Raymond Préfontaine, the minister responsible, acted toward that end on orders from Laurier. Two ships were ordered for the Fisheries Protection Service in 1904 with the purpose of starting cadet training for the impending Canadian navy: Canadian Government Ships (CGS) Canada and Vigilant, for the east and west coasts respectively. CGS Canada was a 910-tonne steamship built to the naval specifications in 1903–1904. The naval legislation drafted by Préfontaine stated that these ships would form the nucleus of training for the Naval Militia. In Laurier's government there was proposal to establish a naval militia in Canada. As a result, Britain encouraged the Dominion for contributions to the arms race in Europe.

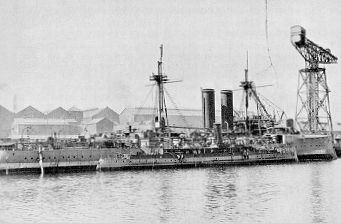
CGS Canada. Built by Vickers Sons and Maxim at Barrow-in-Furness in 1904, was 200 feet (61 m) in length and could steam at 22 knots (41 km/h; 25 mph).

After the death of Préfontaine in 1905, Laurier appointed Louis-Philippe Brodeur as minister. Brodeur had the arduous task of re-organizing his department after a report by the Royal Commission on the Civil Service stated that its administration was characterized by "constant blundering and confusion", "with no visible sign of an intelligence purpose unless it be that of spending as much money as possible". In order to investigate his department, Brodeur called for a Special Commission; on 1 April 1908 the Cassels Commission was formed.

As a result of the Cassels Commission, Brodeur instilled key changes to his department. George S. Desbarats replaced François Gaudreau as deputy minister. For Director of the Marine Service, Brodeur chose a Canadian who had served in the Royal Navy since 1869, Rear-Admiral (later Admiral Sir) Charles Kingsmill. Kingsmill replaced former Lieutenant Osprey George Valentine Spain, an inept administrator who had left the British naval forces "under a cloud which still makes it impossible for him to go aboard a British man-of-war".

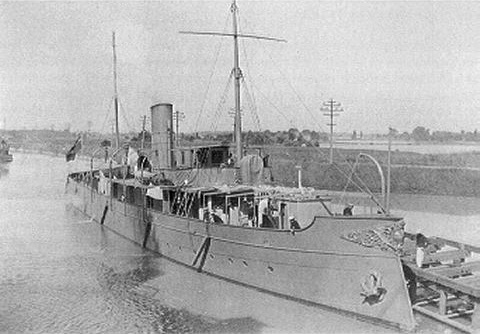
CGS Vigilant. Built by Polson's at Toronto in 1904. She may be regarded as the first "modern" warship to be built in Canada.

As director, Kingsmill commanded the Marine and Fisheries fleet from 1908 to 1910. He subsequently served as the director of the Naval Service of Canada until his retirement in 1920. He received a knighthood in 1918.

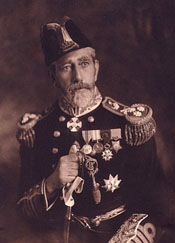
Admiral Sir Charles Kingsmill 1855–1935

After instilling these changes, Laurier believed he would get the unanimous support of parliament for his plans to militarise the Fisheries Protection Service into a navy proper. He especially hoped that the appointment of the francophones Brodeur and Desbarats as minister and deputy minister would appease the Canadiens in Quebec.

== Laurier's two alternatives ==
The British government was advised that Britain was losing the naval arms race against Germany. This shocking revelation, made on 16 March 1909, spread panic throughout the empire and led to several offers of funds for the construction of dreadnoughts from New Zealand and several Australian states' governments. Pressure was exerted by the Canadian imperialists to follow suit. This crisis changed the Canadian Navy question from a local issue to one encompassing the naval defence of the whole empire. The ensuing resolution was presented to the House of Commons by the one-time minister of Marine and Fisheries conservative MP Sir George Foster from New Brunswick and stated: "That in the opinion of this House, in view of her great and varied resources, of her geographical position and natural environments, and of that spirit of self-help and self-respect which alone benefits a strong and growing people, Canada should no longer delay in assuming her proper share of the responsibility and financial burden incident to suitable protection of her exposed coastline and great seaports."

The two options were the establishment of the Canadian Navy or continued financial support of the one in Britain. The former became the position generally supported in the House. As the debate ensued, it became clear that Laurier's scheme of militarizing the Fisheries Protection Service was inadequate and would not garner unanimous support. The amended proposal was that of a small navy, given that "The House will cordially approve of any necessary expenditure designed to promote the speedy organization of a Canadian naval service".

At the Imperial Conference of July and August 1909, the Admiralty stated that to be effective in contributing to the defence of the imperial sea lanes, the Canadian Navy should comprise a minimum of three Bristol-class cruisers and four destroyers. A fleet of one Boadicea-class heavy cruiser, four Bristols, and six destroyers for an annual spending of £600,000 was considered much preferable. The Admiralty offered to loan two cruisers to Canada to begin training. This led to accusations from Laurier's opposition that what was really attempted was the creation of a unit of the Imperial Navy, not a Canadian Navy proper. The Naval Service Act, proposed to the House of Commons on 10 January 1910, called for a fleet of eleven warships: one Boadicea, four Bristol-class cruisers and five torpedo-boat destroyers. All ships were to have been built in Canada, at an annual cost of $2.5 million.

== Opposition ==
The opposition Conservative coalition, the imperialists under Sir Robert Borden and the Nationalistes led by Henri Bourassa, vehemently opposed Laurier's plans for a Canadian Navy, but for totally different reasons. Bourassa founded the daily newspaper Le Devoir, with the express purpose of defeating the Naval Service Act through insinuations and allegations that conscription would soon follow. His camp claimed that the cruisers proposed were more than Canada needed for fisheries and sovereignty protection, but were sufficient to attract the attention of other navies. He further stated that Canadian squadrons, paid by and for Canada, put under the command of the Admiralty in times of war, meant an "automatic involvement on every imperial war." This would put Canada in danger of being drawn into distant conflicts as a result of its ships operating under the White Ensign.

The Borden camp, on the other hand, charged that the Liberals were insufficiently loyal to the empire. They contended that the proposal was not enough to secure Canada's coasts or help Britain in its current arms race crisis against Germany and that the only viable option was to vote money for the construction of battleships to expand the navy in Britain.

== Canadian Navy ==
The Naval Service Act establishing the Canadian Navy became law 4 May 1909. In addition to a Regular Force, the Act included a Reserve and a Naval Volunteer Force, and a Naval College located in Halifax. The administrative and discipline regulations adopted were the same as those of the Royal Navy, the "King's Regulations and Admiralty Orders" (KR&AI), and the British Naval Discipline Act 1866 (29 & 30 Vict. c. 109). These two key documents would remain in practice for the next forty years. Training was to be conducted to standards that coincided with those of Britain; pay, promotions and service experience were to be transferable, and a common promotion list was adopted.

The Admiralty proved reluctant to allow the Canadian government to exercise full control over its fleet. This contentious issue of jurisdiction beyond the three-mile limit was resolved at the Imperial Conference of 1911, with the formation of the Canadian Atlantic and Pacific Stations, covering the waters North of 30°, and ranging from 40° to 160° West. It was also decided that the new colonial navies, Canadian and Australian, although exclusively controlled by their respective governments, would act on behalf of the British Government on occasions when on foreign stations. If and when the Dominion ships were placed "at the disposal of the Imperial Government by the Dominion authorities" in times of war, they would form part of the British Royal Navy and remain under control of the Admiralty for the duration of the war. It was up to the Dominions themselves to decide what naval assets were placed at Britain's disposal, as Laurier had pledged. When Britain brought its fleet back to the European theatre, they handed over the two bases in Halifax and Esquimalt. This left Canada with the responsibility for defending the longest coastline in the world.

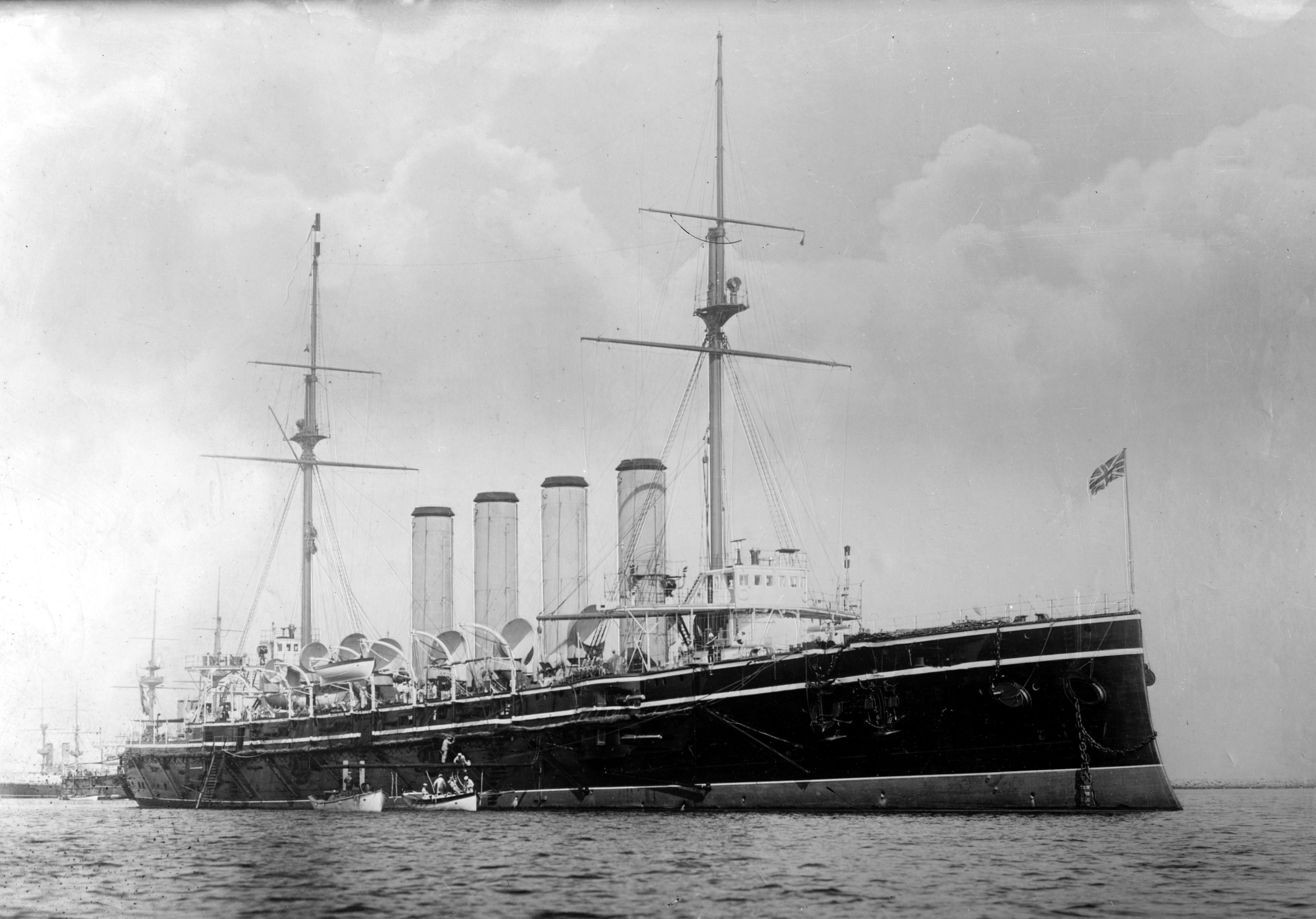
HMCS Niobe, with a displacement of 11,000 tons and a length of 450 feet (140 m), was a substantial asset for the fledgeling RCN of 1910.

The first warships of the RCN were the cruisers HMCS Niobe and HMCS Rainbow, acquired from Britain. Niobe, an 11,000-ton Diadem-class protected cruiser, had been launched in 1897. Although relatively young, she had been deemed obsolete by the British because of her lack of side or deck armour; she did possess an armour belt over her vital installations amidships. She reached Halifax on 21 October 1910. Rainbow, much smaller than Niobe at 3,600 tons, was herself an Apollo-class cruiser launched in 1891. She was dispatched from Britain bound for Canada two months before Niobe, but because the Panama Canal had yet to be completed, did not arrive in Esquimalt until 7 November.

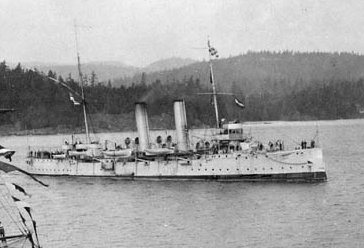
HMCS Rainbow, the first RCN ship assigned to Esquimalt in 1910.

Newspapers of the day were quite critical of this embryonic service. A Toronto Tory newspaper indicated Niobe was on her way to the scrap heap, while Bourassa's Le Devoir proclaimed her "canadienne en temps de paix, impériale en temps de guerre" (Canadian in peacetime, Imperial in wartime). The Mail and Empire called Niobe a "cruiser which the Royal Navy has discarded." The Naval Service of Canada was eventually given royal consent on 29 August 1911, and was from then on officially designated as the Royal Canadian Navy. The first large warship that was purpose-built for the Royal Canadian Navy was HMCS Saguenay in 1931. This event initiated the shipbuilding industry for the navy in Canada. A tradition that still stands to this day.

== Fall of the Laurier Government ==
On 21 September 1911, Sir Robert Borden's Conservatives defeated the Liberal government of Sir Wilfrid Laurier. The naval issue had ranked far behind that of trade reciprocity with the US in most of Canada during the election campaign, but Henri Bourassa made sure that it took centre stage in Quebec. It cost the Liberals eighteen seats in Quebec. Although Laurier's other losses in the rest of Canada were sufficient to ensure his defeat, the loss of the Quebec seats would set the tone for Borden's naval policy. This almost doomed the RCN to languish and suffer an apparently slow and unnoticed death over the years leading to World War I. With Robert Borden's government winning the election in the Fall of 1911, a priority was to accommodate French Canadian concerns by reducing the Royal Canadian Navy's budget.

At the urging of the Admiralty's First Sea Lord Sir Winston Churchill, Prime Minister Borden agreed to finance the construction of three dreadnoughts for $35 million. This plan was far more costly than Laurier's original plan of the Canadian-built fleet and would reap no benefits to Canadian industries whatsoever. On 5 December 1912, Borden introduced the Naval Aid Bill as a one-time contribution to Britain's navy. After bitter debate, the Bill passed third reading in Parliament the second week of May 1913 but was soundly defeated by the Liberal-majority Senate. Canada was left with the Naval Service Act on the books, but no naval policy.

== See also ==
- Canadian Armed Forces
- History of the Royal Canadian Navy
- Provincial Marine

== Notes ==
=== References ===
- Appleton, T. E. (1969). Usque ad Mare: A History of the Canadian Coast Guard and Marine Services. Ottawa: Queen's Printer.
- Brodeur, Nigel D. (1982). James A. Boutilier (ed.). The RCN in Retrospect. Vancouver: University of British Columbia Press.
- Cook, Ramsay (1997). Craig Brown (ed.). The illustrated History of Canada. Key Porter Books.
- German, Tony (1990). The Sea is at our Gates—The History of the Canadian Navy. Toronto: McClelland & Stewart Press.
- Hadley, Michael L.; Sarty, Roger (1991). Tin-Pots and Pirate Ships: Canadian Naval Forces and German Sea Raiders 1880-1918. Montreal & Kingston: McGill-Queen's University Press.
- McNeil, Daniel (2000–2001). "Technology, History and the Revolution in Military Affairs". Canadian Military Journal. 1 (4).
- Milner, Marc (1999). Canada's Navy: The First Century. Toronto: University of Toronto Press.
- Morton, Desmond (1985). A Military History of Canada: From Champlain to Kosovo. Toronto: McLelland and Stewart Press.
- Tucker, Gilbert Norman (1952). The Naval Service of Canada: Its Official Story- Volume 1 Origins and Early Years. Ottawa: King's Printer.
