= 100th Anniversary of the Canadian Navy =

Memorial in Victoria, British Columbia

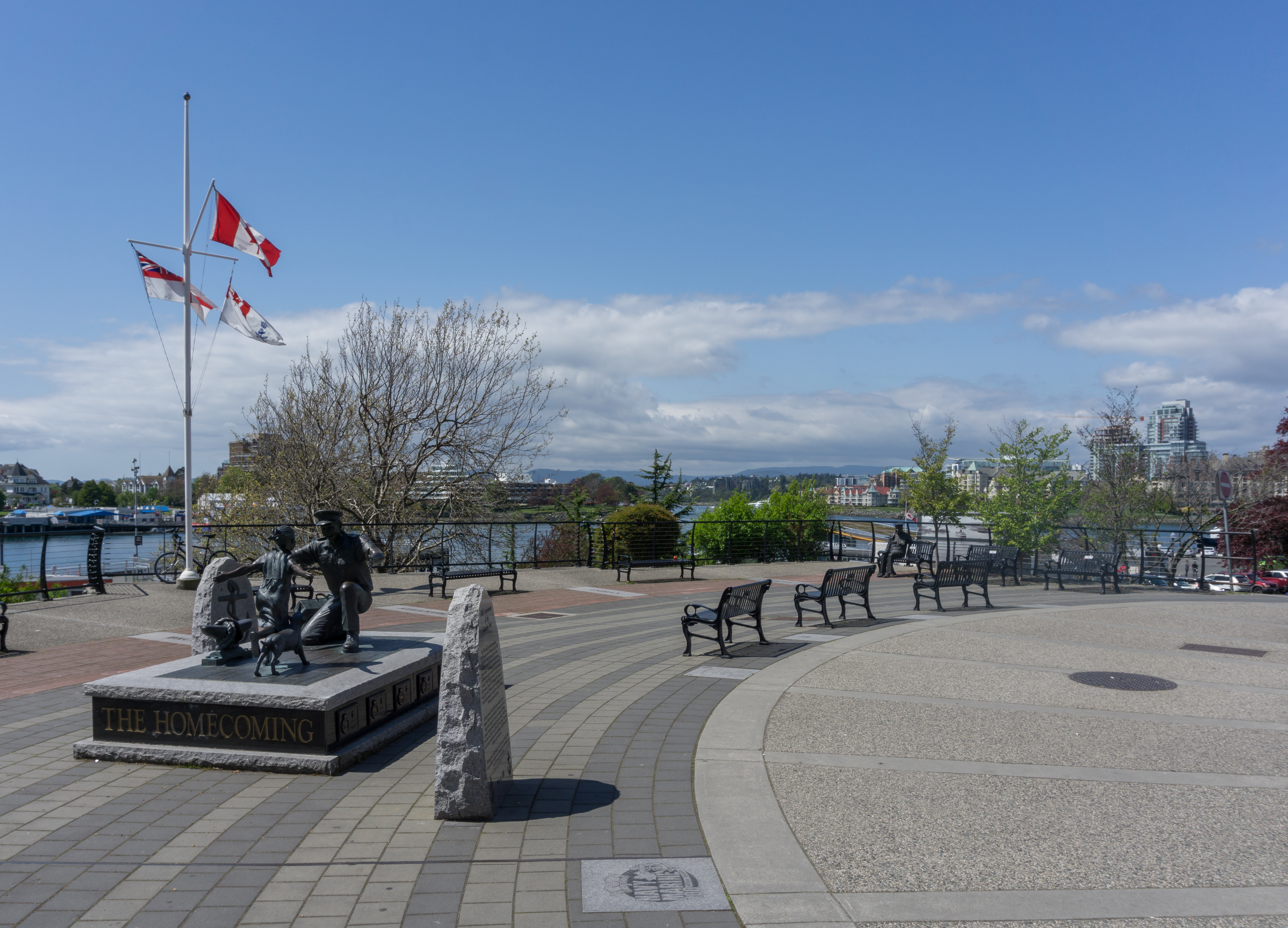
- View of the memorial (2018)
- Interactive map of 100th Anniversary of the Canadian Navy
- Location: Victoria, British Columbia, Canada
- Coordinates: 48.4232°N 123.3693°W
- Designer: Nathan Scott
- Opening date: 4 May 2010
- Dedicated to: Royal Canadian Navy

100th Anniversary of the Canadian Navy is an outdoor memorial in Victoria, British Columbia. It was constructed to commemorate the founding of the Royal Canadian Navy and opened on the date of the navy's centenary. Its central feature is a bronze statue, sculpted by local artist Nathan Scott, entitled The Homecoming that depicts a Canadian sailor reuniting with his daughter upon his return from deployment. The monument also features memorials to individual Canadian vessels and sailors.

== History ==
The monument was erected on 4 May 2010 to commemorate the 100th anniversary of the establishment of the Royal Canadian Navy via the Naval Service Act of 1910. It is intended as a marker of the nation's gratitude to the tens of thousands of sailors who have served with the force on more than 850 Canadian vessels since then. Local philanthropist and Honorary Navy Captain Cedric Steele was the driving force behind the project. His inspiration came from a statue in Halifax, Nova Scotia that commemorates the Navy's 75th anniversary. The site for the monument was donated by Greater Victoria Harbour Authority chairman Bill Wellburn.

The patron of the monument was Lieutenant Governor of British Columbia Steven Point who was supported by retired Vice-Admiral Nigel Brodeur and then-Commander of Maritime Forces Pacific Rear Admiral Tyrone Pile. It was funded through a CA$150,000 fundraising campaign which included the sale of pewter small-scale copies of the statue and commemorative paving stones which surround the completed monument. The monument's unveiling was attended by the coastal defence vessel Brandon and navy veterans.

== Description ==
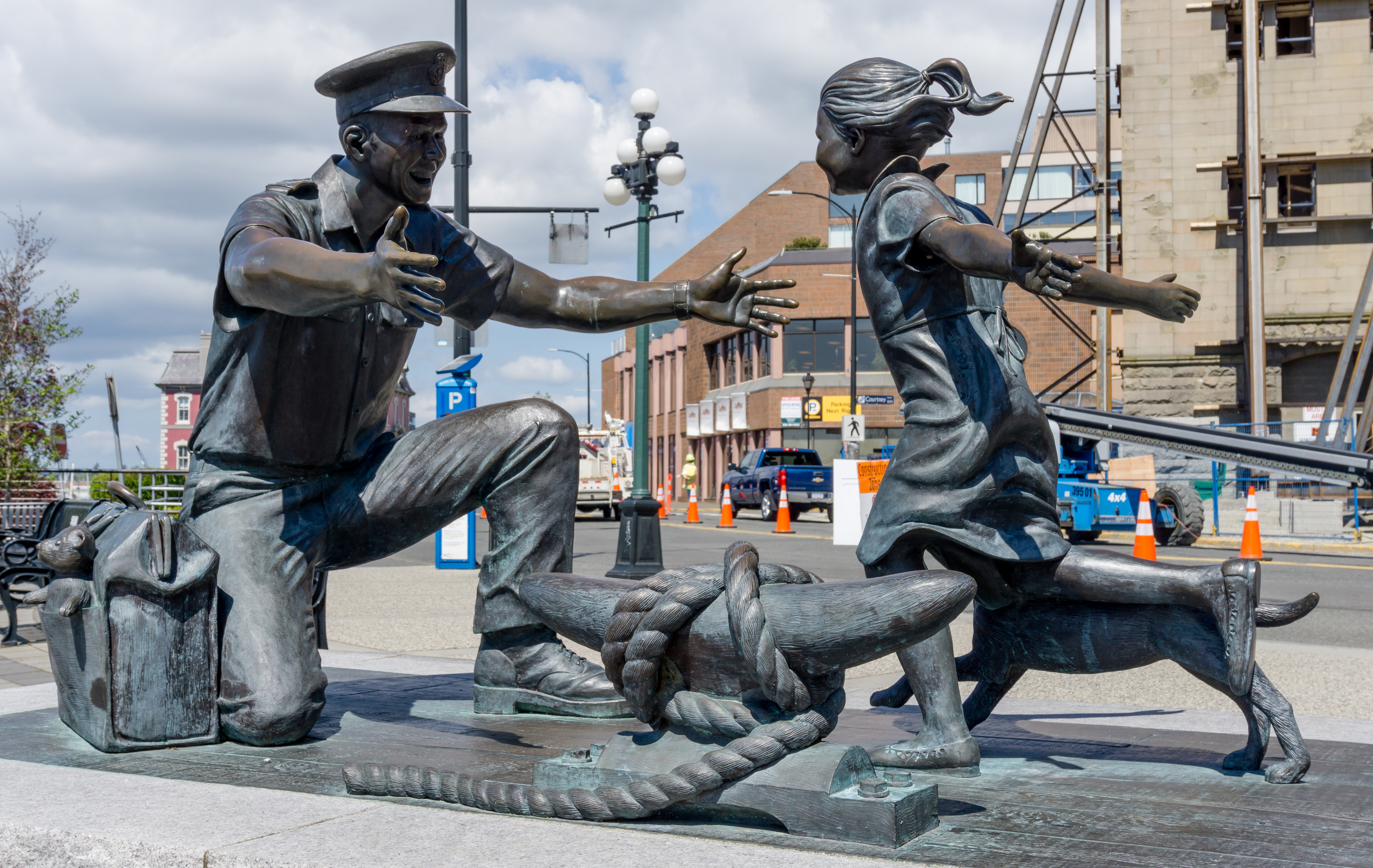
The Homecoming in 2018

The monument is located on Wharf Street in Victoria, British Columbia. It comprises the bronze Homecoming statue set that depicts a sailor reuniting with his daughter (and dog) after returning from deployment; a stone marker describing the history of the Canadian Navy and the date of the monument's unveiling; and a second stone marker depicting the insignia of Navy veteran's associations, the names of individual supporters and the English translation of the Navy motto "Parati vero parati" ("Ready aye ready"). The central statue The Homecoming was sculpted by Nathan Scott, a local artist with a studio and foundry in Victoria.

The rear of both stone markers (on the side closest to The Homecoming) depicts the fouled anchor insignia of the Royal Canadian Navy in bronze. The dark marble plinth of Homecoming has the name of the statue in gold lettering on one side and plaques mounted in memory of individual Canadian vessels on the other three, the plinth is surmounted by light-grey granite capping stones. The paved area surrounding the monument contains the commemorative stones engraved in memory of service men that were sold as part of its fundraising campaign. The stones continue to be sold and installed at the site to raise funds for the Esquimalt Military Family Resource Centre.

== See also ==
- 2010 in art
- History of the Royal Canadian Navy
