= History of the Royal Canadian Navy =

The history of the Royal Canadian Navy goes back to 1910, when the naval force was created as the Naval Service of Canada and renamed a year later by King George V. The Royal Canadian Navy (RCN) is one of the three environmental commands of the Canadian Forces. Over the course of its history, the RCN has played a role in the First World War, contributed significantly to the Battle of the Atlantic during the Second World War, and was a part of NATO's force buildup during the Cold War. In 1968, the RCN was amalgamated with the Canadian Army and the Royal Canadian Air Force to form what is today the unified Canadian Armed Forces. The naval force was known as Maritime Command until 2011, when the environmental command was renamed as the Royal Canadian Navy.

== History ==
=== Formative years ===
His Majesty having been graciously pleased to authorize that the Canadian Naval Forces shall be designated the "Royal Canadian Navy," this title is to be officially adopted, the abbreviation thereof being 'RCN'.

— King George V, 29 August 1911

During the early years of the 20th century, there was growing debate within the British Empire as to the role the Dominions would play in defence and foreign relations. Because of the developing naval arms race with Germany, a key part of this discussion focused on naval issues. In Canada, the naval debate came down to a choice between two options: either the young country could provide funds, support and manpower to the Royal Navy, or it could form its own navy, which could help support the Royal Navy if necessary. After extensive political debates, Canadian politicians chose the latter option.

On 29 March 1909, George Foster introduced a resolution in the House of Commons calling for the establishment of a Canadian Naval Service. The resolution was not successful; however, on 12 January 1910, the government of Prime Minister Sir Wilfrid Laurier took Foster's resolution and introduced it as the Naval Service Bill. After third reading, the bill received royal assent on 4 May 1910, becoming the Naval Service Act which created a Department of the Naval Service under the Minister of Marine and Fisheries, who also became the Minister of the Naval Service. The act called for:

- a permanent force
- a reserve (to be called up in emergency)
- a volunteer reserve (to be called up in emergency)
- the establishment of a naval college

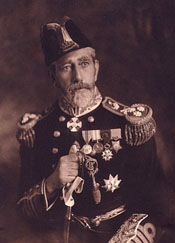
Rear-Admiral Charles Kingsmill was named the first director of the Naval Service of Canada in 1910. The service was later renamed the Royal Canadian Navy in 1911.

The official title of the navy was the Naval Service of Canada (also Canadian Naval Forces), and the first Director of the Naval Service of Canada was Rear-Admiral Charles Kingsmill (Royal Navy, retired), who had previously been in charge of the Marine Service of the Department of Marine and Fisheries. A request to change name of the Naval Service of Canada to Royal Canadian Navy on 30 January 1911, brought a favourable reply from King George V on 29 August of that year.

The naval college was established in the dockyard at Halifax, Nova Scotia in 1911 as "Royal Naval College of Canada". The Royal Naval College was established to impart a complete education in Naval Science. Graduates were qualified to enter the Imperial or Canadian Service as midshipmen although a Naval career was not compulsory. The course provided a grounding in Applied Science, Engineering, Mathematics, Navigation, History and Modern Languages and was accepted as qualifying for entry as second-year students in Canadian Universities. The program aimed to develop both the physical and mental including discipline, the ability to obey and take charge, and honour. Candidates had to be between their fourteenth and sixteenth birthdays on 1 July following the examination. The original Royal Naval College of Canada facilities were destroyed in December 1917 in the Halifax Explosion. What could be salvaged was moved to HMCS Stone Frigate at the Royal Military College of Canada (RMC) in Kingston, Ontario. The "Royal Canadian Naval College" moved in 1919 to a building in the naval dockyard at Esquimalt, British Columbia. The college was closed in 1922.

To form the nucleus of its new navy, and to train Canadians for the country's planned fleet of five cruisers and six destroyers, Canada acquired two ships from Great Britain. The cruiser HMCS Rainbow was the first ship commissioned into Canada's navy on 4 August 1910, at Portsmouth, England. She arrived at Esquimalt on 7 November 1910, and carried out fishery patrols and training duties on Canada's west coast. Another Royal Navy cruiser, Niobe, became the second ship commissioned into the Canadian navy on 6 September 1910, at Devonport in England and arrived at Halifax, Nova Scotia, on 21 October 1910—Trafalgar Day.

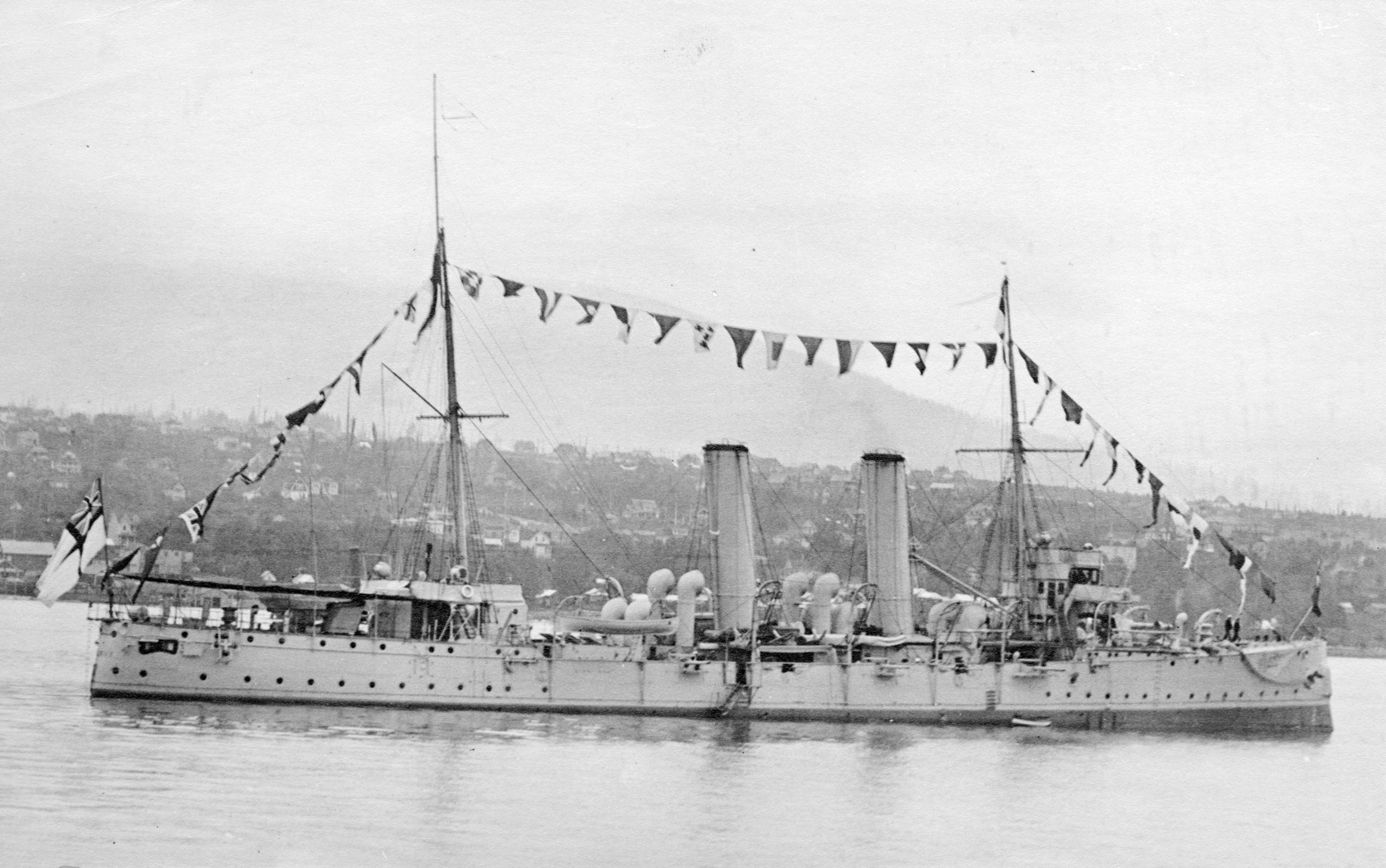
The cruiser HMCS Rainbow was the first ship commissioned into the service.

These initial plans encountered significant setbacks following Laurier's defeat in the 1911 federal election, in which the debate about naval policy played a significant part. The new Conservative government, led by Robert Borden, had opposed the Naval Service Act while they were in opposition. At the urging of the Admiralty's First Sea Lord Winston Churchill, Borden agreed to finance the construction of three dreadnoughts for $35 million. This plan was far more costly than Laurier's original plan of the Canadian-built fleet, and would reap no benefits to Canadian industries whatsoever. On 5 December 1912, Borden introduced the Naval Aid Bill as a one-time contribution to the British Royal Navy. After a bitter debate and a long filibuster by the opposition Liberals, the Borden government invoked closure on the debate, for the first time ever in Canadian Parliament, and the bill passed third reading on 15 May 1913. The act was soundly defeated by the Liberal-majority Senate two weeks later. The Royal Canadian Navy now found itself in limbo, with very limited funds for operations, two obsolescent cruisers, and no prospect of new ships being built or acquired.

Despite the problems of these early years, some Canadians were still active supporters of a national navy. Building on earlier, unofficial efforts, a volunteer reserve came into being in May 1914 as the Royal Naval Canadian Volunteer Reserve (RNCVR). Its initial establishment was 1,200 men, and it was divided into three distinct geographic areas: (1) Atlantic, (2) Pacific, and (3) Lake (representing inland areas). During the First World War, it would expand considerably, and also establish an "Overseas Division" specifically for service with the Royal Navy.

Immediately before the First World War, the premier of British Columbia, in a fit of public spirit, purchased two submarines (CC-1 and CC-2) from a shipyard in Washington. The submarines had been built for the Chilean Navy but the purchase had fallen through. On 7 August 1914, the Government of Canada purchased the boats from the Government of British Columbia, and they were consequently commissioned into the RCN.

=== First World War ===
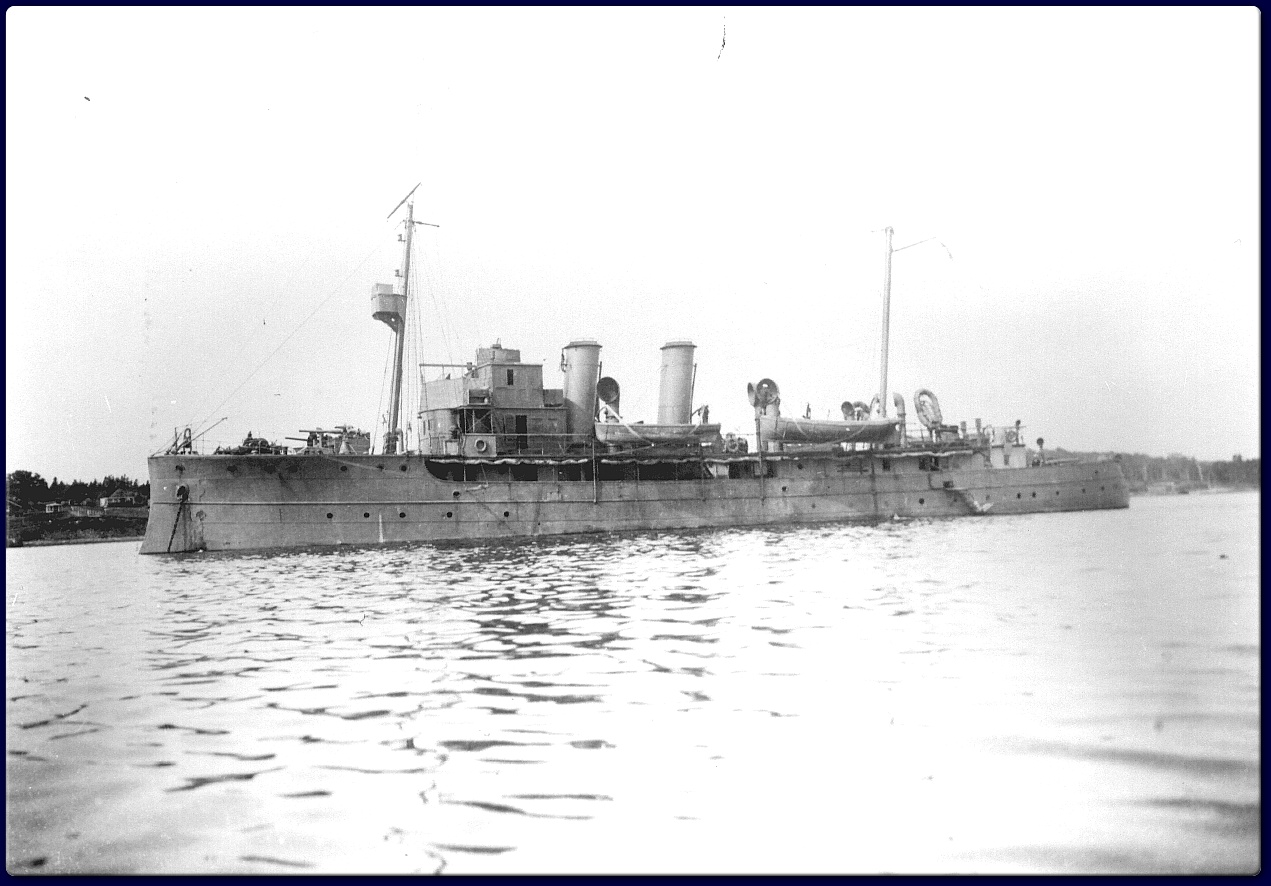
CGS Margaret (renamed HMCS Margaret) was one of several ships pressed into naval service at the outbreak of the First World War

At the outbreak of the First World War on 5 August 1914, two government vessels, CGS Canada (renamed HMCS Canada) and CGS Margaret, were immediately pressed into naval service, joining Niobe, Rainbow and the two submarines CC-1 and CC-2, to form a six-vessel naval force. At this point, London and Ottawa were planning to significantly expand the RCN, but it was decided that Canadian men would be permitted to enlist in either the Royal Navy or its Canadian counterpart, with many choosing the former.

During the fall of 1914, HMCS Rainbow patrolled the west coast of North America, as far south as Panama, although these patrols became less important following the elimination of the German naval threat in the Pacific with the December 1914 defeat of German Admiral Maximilian von Spee's East Asia Squadron in the Battle of the Falkland Islands. Many of Rainbow's crew were posted to the east coast for the remainder of the war and by 1917 Rainbow was withdrawn from service.

The early part of the war also saw HMCS Niobe actively patrolling off the coast of New York City as part of British blockading forces, but she returned to Halifax permanently in July 1915 when she was declared no longer fit for service and was converted to a depot ship. She was heavily damaged in the December 1917 Halifax Explosion.

CC-1 and CC-2 spent the first three years of the war patrolling the Pacific; however, the lack of German threat saw them reposted to Halifax in 1917. With their tender, HMCS Shearwater, they became the first warships to transit the Panama Canal flying the White Ensign (the RCN's service flag). Arriving in Halifax on 17 October 1917, they were declared unfit for service and never patrolled again, being scrapped in 1920.

In June 1918, HMHS Llandovery Castle was sunk by a U-boat. In terms of the number of dead- 234 - the sinking was the most significant Canadian naval disaster of the First World War.

On 5 September 1918, the Royal Canadian Naval Air Service (RCNAS) was formed with a main function to carry out anti-submarine operations using flying boat patrol aircraft. The U.S. Navy's Naval Air Station Halifax, located on the eastern shores of the harbour at Eastern Passage, Nova Scotia, was acquired, but following the 11 November 1918 Armistice, the RCNAS was discontinued.

=== Inter-war period ===
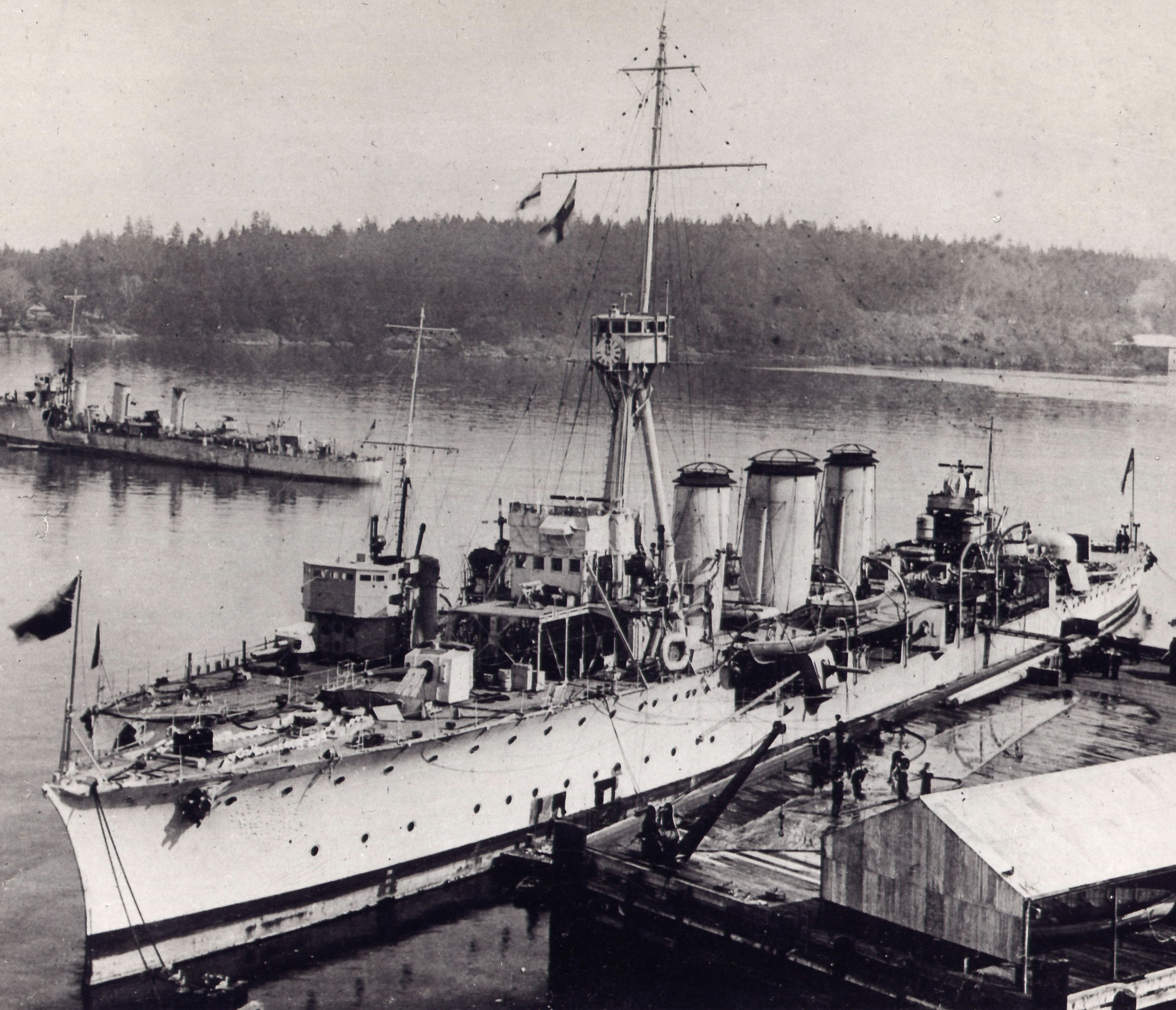
The light cruiser HMCS Aurora was decommissioned in 1922, along with a number of other ships as the RCN scaled-back after the First World War.

Following a draw-down in the RCN after the war, the RCN undertook to find a mission and found it in taking over many of the civilian responsibilities of the Marine Service of the Department of Transport. Even though by 1922 the RCN had been cut back to 366 men and had paid off its last remaining cruiser HMCS Aurora, the Navy kept two destroyers donated by the Royal Navy, HMCS Patriot and HMCS Patrician, until they were replaced in the late 1920s by two other ex-Royal Navy vessels HMCS Champlain and HMCS Vancouver, and thereby maintained ships in service throughout the lean years.

On 31 January 1923, the RNCVR was replaced by the Royal Canadian Naval Volunteer Reserve (RCNVR). The initial authorized strength of the RCNVR was 1,000 all ranks. Twelve Canadian cities (Calgary, Charlottetown, Edmonton, Halifax, Hamilton, Ottawa, Prince Rupert, Quebec City, Regina, Saint John, Saskatoon and Vancouver) were earmarked for divisions of "Half-Company" strength, i.e. 50 men, all ranks. Three larger cities (Toronto, Montreal and Winnipeg) were ordered to man to a "Company" strength, which was 100, all ranks. The first commission was given, on 14 March 1923, to Lieutenant Frank Meade, who established a Company sized detachment in Montreal. By the end of 1923, twelve units had been formed.

In 1931, the RCN underwent a major facelift when the first ships specifically built for the RCN, the destroyers HMCS Saguenay and HMCS Skeena, were commissioned at Portsmouth, England.

In late January 1932, Skeena along with Vancouver provided protection to British assets and civilians in El Salvador at the request of the British Consul in San Salvador following the outbreak of a peasant uprising. A landing party was briefly sent ashore at Acajutla, but the situation there improved and the sailors saw no combat, although the two ships remained in the area until the end of the month.

Throughout the 1930s, the RCN, along with its sister services, was starved of funding and equipment. Nevertheless, this decade saw the RCN slowly begin its rebuilding, as Ottawa joined London, Paris, and Washington in a growing apprehension of the ramifications of Nazi Germany's rearmament and the adventurism of Italy and Japan, and procured two more destroyers from the Royal Navy: HMCS Ottawa and HMCS Restigouche. A custom-built training vessel, the tern schooner HMCS Venture based on the famous Bluenose was commissioned in 1938 for advanced seamanship training. By the outbreak of war in September 1939, however, the RCN still had only six River-class destroyers, five minesweepers and two small training vessels, bases at Halifax and Victoria, and altogether 145 officers and 1,674 men.

=== Second World War ===
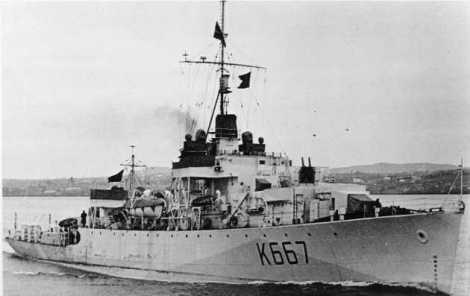
The frigate HMCS Inch Arran was one of many ships commissioned during the Second World War. The RCN expanded substantially during WW2, becoming the fourth-largest navy in the world at the end of the war.

The RCN expanded substantially during the Second World War, with the larger vessels transferred or purchased from the US and British navies (many through the Destroyers for Bases Agreement), and the smaller vessels such as corvettes and frigates constructed in Canada. By the end of the conflict Canada had the fourth-largest navy in the world, behind the United States, the United Kingdom and the USSR, but only two ships larger than destroyers, the light cruisers HMCS Uganda and HMCS Ontario. Although it showed its inexperience at times during the early part of the war, a navy made up of men from all across the country, including many who had never before seen a large body of water, proved capable of exceeding the expectations of its allies. By the end of the Battle of the Atlantic, the RCN was the primary navy in the northwest sector of the Atlantic Ocean and under the command of Rear-Admiral Murray was responsible for the safe escort of innumerable convoys and the destruction of many U-boats—an anti-submarine capability that the RCN would build upon in post-war years. The Northwest Atlantic Theatre was the only theatre not under command of either a Briton or American during the entire war.

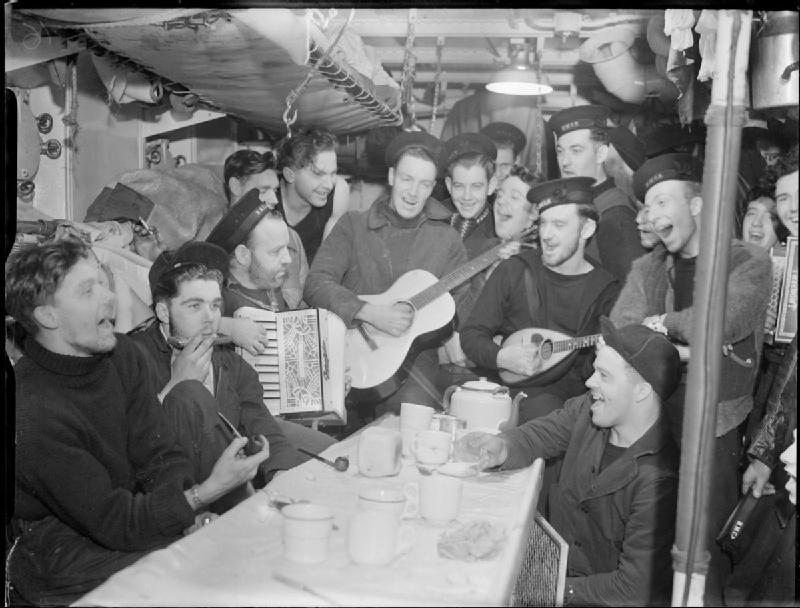
Royal Canadian Navy crew during Second World War

At the end of the Battle of the Atlantic, Canadian ships (either alone or in conjunction with other ships and planes) sank a total of 27 U-boats, and either sank or captured 42 Axis surface ships. But the real victory was not so much in the statistics of battle, as in the successful completion of 25,343 merchant ship crossings, carrying 181,643,180 tons of cargo and a significant proportion of the Canadian and US forces for the eventual victory in Europe. Canada lost 24 ships in five different theatres: first was Fraser, sunk in a collision while evacuating refugees from France in 1940; Athabaskan, Regina, Alberni and Trentonian were lost in 1944 during Operation Neptune and cross-Channel escort duty; Louisburg and Weyburn sank in the Mediterranean Sea during the North African invasions of Operation Torch; eight ships were sunk protecting Canadian coastal waters Bras d'Or, Chedabucto, Clayoquot and Esquimalt (minesweepers), Otter and Raccoon (armed yachts), and Charlottetown and Shawinigan (corvettes); and nine ships were lost on Atlantic escort duty Margaree, Levis, Windflower, Spikenard, Ottawa, St. Croix, Valleyfield, Skeena and Guysborough (on loan to the RCN from the Royal Navy). Altogether the RCN lost 1,797 seamen, and 95 became prisoners of war.

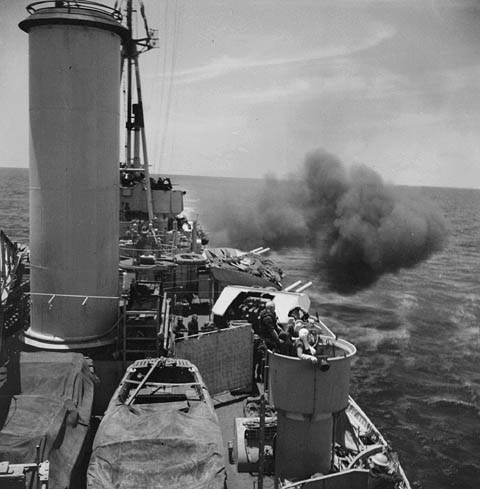
Naval bombardment by HMCS Uganda on Miyako-jima in May 1945. Uganda was one of several RCN ships attached to the British Pacific Fleet.

As the end of the war against Germany approached, attention focused on Japan. At the end of 1944, some RCN ships were deployed with the British Pacific Fleet, joining the many Canadian personnel already serving with the Royal Navy in the Pacific War. Ottawa was also laying plans to expand the RCN's capabilities beyond its anti-submarine orientation. The war in the Pacific was expected to culminate with a massive invasion of Japan itself, and this would need a different navy than that required in the Atlantic.

Britain was nearly bankrupt after five and a half years of war and was looking to shrink its military somewhat, especially since the United States was now the dominant power in the Pacific. With this in mind, the RCN and the Royal Australian Navy were to receive many ships considered surplus to the RN's needs, with the end goal being a powerful Commonwealth fleet of Australian, British, Canadian, and New Zealand ships alongside the United States Navy. As in the First World War, the war ended before these plans came to fruition. With the dropping of two nuclear bombs on Hiroshima and Nagasaki, Japan's surrender was effected.

With the end of the war, the RCN stopped expanding. A planned transfer of two light aircraft carriers from the Royal Navy, HMCS Warrior and HMCS Magnificent was slowed, and when Warrior was found to be unsuitable for a North Atlantic winter, she was sent to the west coast and the next year was replaced by Magnificent, with Warrior being returned to the Royal Navy. Canada still had two light cruisers, HMCS Ontario and HMCS Uganda (later HMCS Quebec), a number of Tribal class and other destroyers, and a mass of frigates, corvettes, and other ships, the majority of which were mothballed by 1947.

=== 1949 'mutinies' ===
In the late winter of 1949, the RCN was shaken by three almost simultaneous cases of mass insubordination variously described as "Incidents" or "Mutinies":

- On 26 February, when the destroyer HMCS Athabaskan was on a fuelling stop at Manzanillo, Colima, Mexico, ninety Leading Seamen and below—constituting more than half the ship's company—locked themselves in their messdecks, and refused to come out until getting the captain to hear their grievances.
- On 15 March, in another destroyer—HMCS Crescent, at Nanjing, China—eighty-three junior ratings held a similar protest.
- On 20 March, thirty-two aircraft handlers on the carrier Magnificent, which was on fleet manoeuvres in the Caribbean Sea, briefly refused an order to turn to morning cleaning stations.

As noted by Dr. Richard Gimblett, researcher and himself a retired naval officer the respective captains in all three cases acted with great sensitivity, entering the messes for an informal discussion of the sailors' grievances and carefully avoided using the term "mutiny," which could have had severe legal consequences for the sailors involved. Specifically, the captain of Athabaskan, while talking with the disgruntled crew members, is known to have placed his cap over a written list of demands, which could have been used as legal evidence of a mutiny, and pretended not to notice it.

Still, the Canadian government of the time—the early years of the Cold War—felt apprehensive of "The Red Menace," especially since the naval sailors' discontent coincided with a strike among members of the Communist-led Canadian Seaman's Union in the Canadian Merchant Navy. (Also, one of the incidents occurred in China, where Communists were in the process of winning a civil war and gaining power).

Defence Minister Brooke Claxton appointed Rear-Admiral Rollo Mainguy, Flag Officer Atlantic Coast, to head a commission of inquiry. The Mainguy Report— described by Dr. Gimblett as "a watershed in the Navy's history, whose findings, recommendations and conclusions remain a potent legacy"—concluded that no evidence was found of Communist influence or of collusion between the three crews.

The "General Causes Contributing to [the] Breakdown of Discipline" noted by the commission included:

- Collapse of the Divisional System of personnel management;
- Failure to provide Welfare Committees for the airing of petty grievances, which led to sailors informally adopting a kind of equivalent to a sit down strike;
- Frequent changes in ships' manning and routines with inadequate explanation;
- A deterioration in the traditional relationship between officers and petty officers;
- The absence of a distinguishing Canadian identity in the Navy.

The last issue—an assertion of "an uncaring officer corps harbouring aristocratic British attitudes inappropriate to Canadian democratic sensitivities"—went beyond the question of sailors' morale and touched on the basic identity of the Canadian Navy and indeed, on the national identity of Canada as a whole.

It was to have ramifications in the process undertaken in later decades, painful to many of the officers concerned, of deliberately cutting off many of the British traditions in the matter of ensigns, uniforms and other matters.

=== Cold War ===
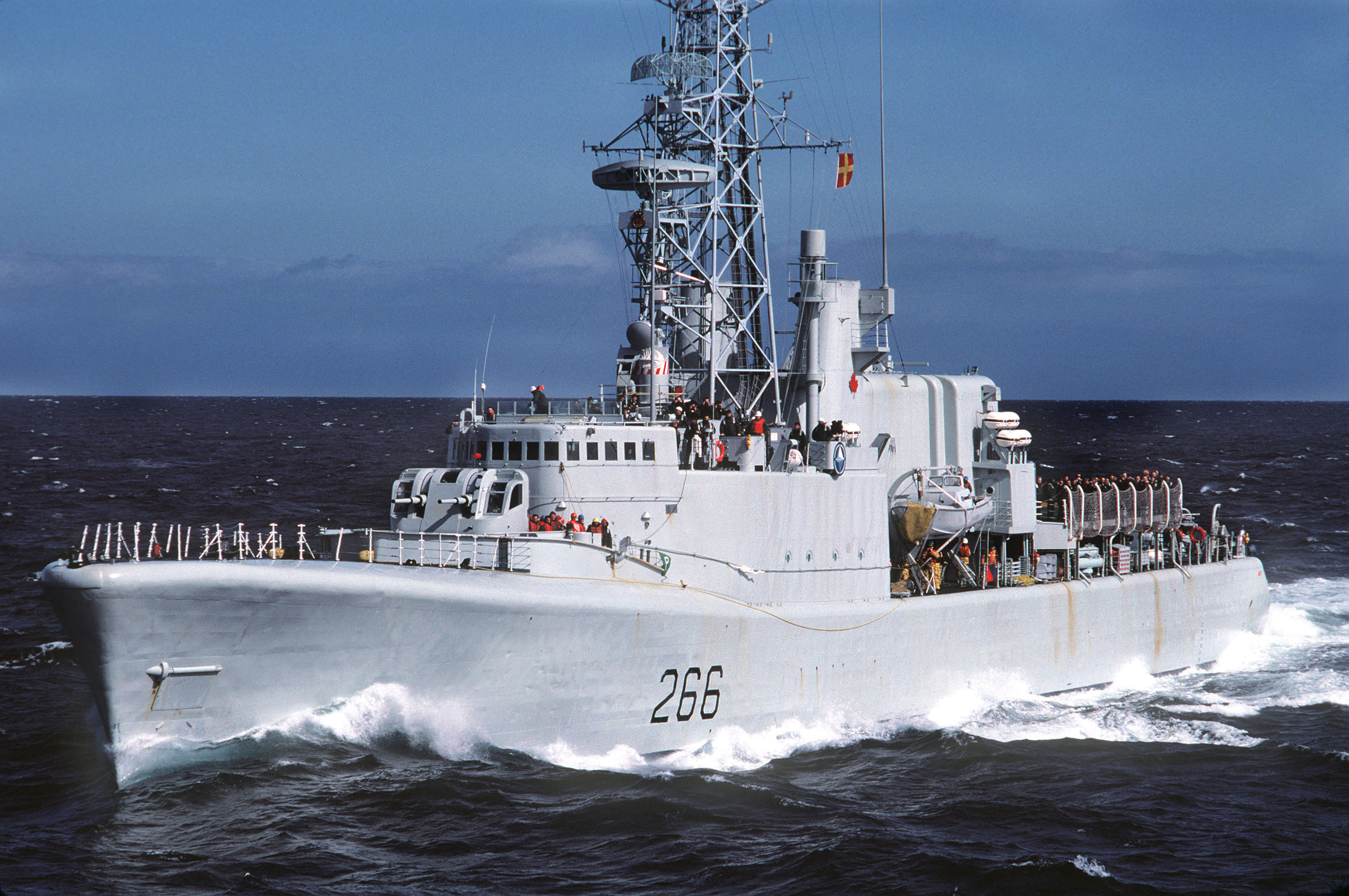
As the Soviet submarine threat grew, the RCN moved to build seven St. Laurent-class anti-submarine destroyer escorts.

Immediately after the end of the Second World War, Canada, like many other countries, dramatically reduced its military expenditures. For the RCN, this meant large cuts to its personnel strength and number of commissioned ships. The emergence of the Cold War and the formation of the North Atlantic Treaty Organization (NATO), followed by the outbreak of the Korean War, prompted the Canadian government to dramatically increase its military spending. For the RCN, this resulted in increased numbers of personnel, the recommissioning and modification of some Second World War ships held in reserve, the design and construction of new classes of ships, and the upgrading of its recently created aviation capabilities. RCN destroyers formed part of Canada's initial response to the United Nations' call for assistance during the Korean War, and were sent to Korean waters to join other UN naval forces. The Canadian ships' duties included "exciting but dangerous" shore bombardments and the destruction of North Korean trains and railway lines. Initially dispatched in 1950, Canadian destroyers maintained a presence off the Korean peninsula until 1955.

At much the same time, the growing Soviet submarine threat led the RCN to update and convert existing ships to improve their anti-submarine capabilities. Most notably, 21 wartime River-class frigates were extensively converted to Prestonian-class frigates during the mid-to-late 1950s. The RCN also acquired several new classes of anti-submarine destroyer escorts (DDEs) to augment its fleet. Built in Canada, these ships pioneered innovative design features, including a distinctive rounded upper part of the hull which helped seawater drain from the deck during the extremely rough weather and also helped minimize winter-time ice buildup. The first of these new ships were the seven St. Laurent-class DDEs, which were soon followed by the Restigouche, Mackenzie, and Annapolis classes with seven, four, and two vessels respectively. Following the construction of these new ships throughout the 1950s and early 1960s, the RCN was able to retire most of its remaining vessels dating from the Second World War. The RCN intended to replace some of the capabilities lost with the retirement of those vessels with the General Purpose Frigate, but after disagreement over the direction of the service, the project was scrapped.

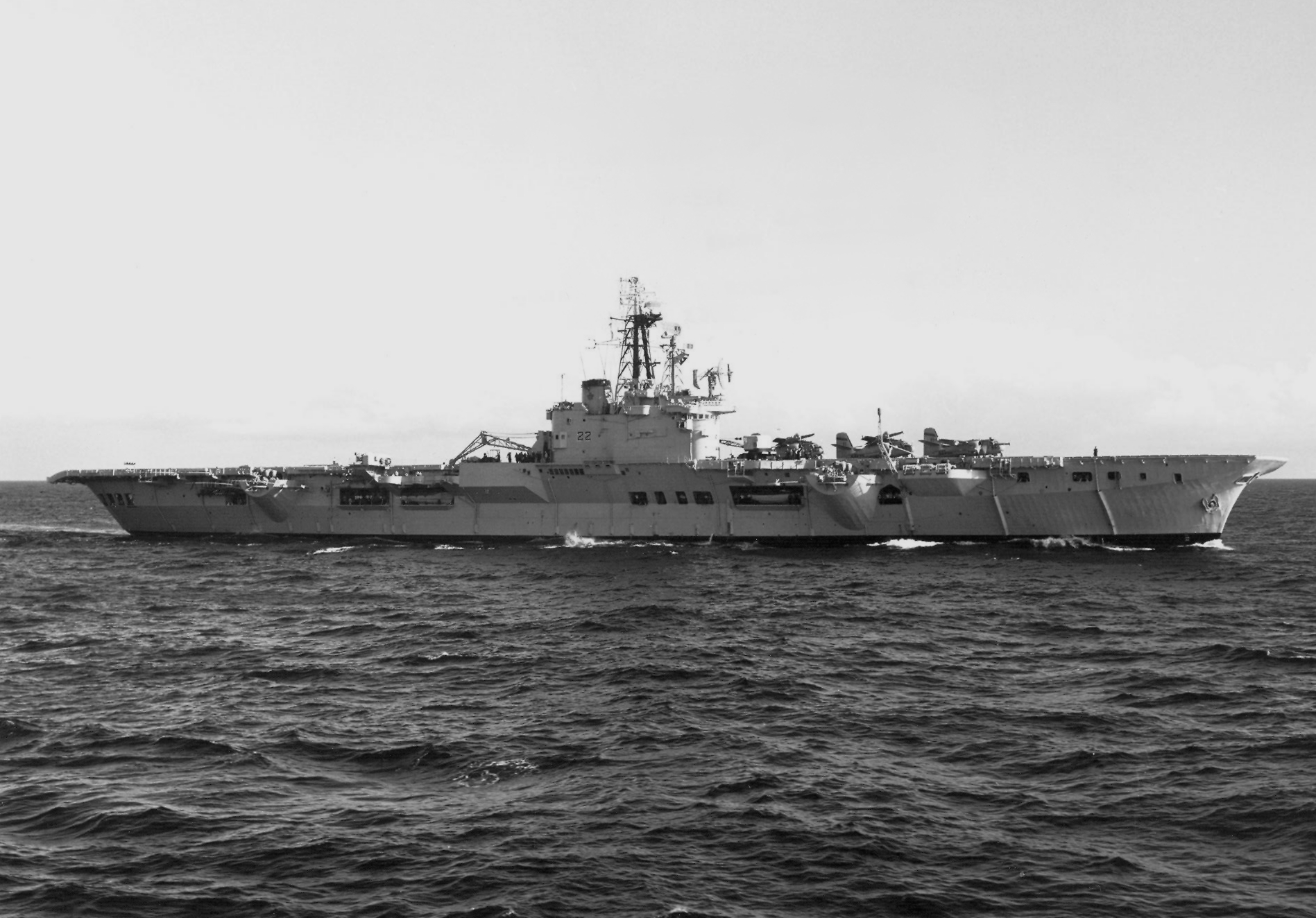
HMCS Bonaventure in 1961. Bonaventure was the last aircraft carrier operated by the Royal Canadian Navy

Seeking to improve its ships' anti-submarine capabilities, the RCN pioneered the use of large ship-borne helicopters on small surface ships like destroyers in the rough waters of the North Atlantic and Pacific. The recovery of helicopters to a wildly pitching flight deck was made possible by the invention of the "Bear Trap", a cable and winch system which hauled a helicopter, hovering at full power, to the flight deck in all manner of conditions. Using this technology, the St. Laurent-class DDEs were upgraded to destroyer-helicopter (DDH) vessels during the early to mid-1960s to accommodate recently acquired CH-124 Sea King anti-submarine helicopters. Other ships also received upgrades to increase their anti-submarine capabilities. The RCN was also actively involved in the development of various forms of ship-borne sonar, most notably the variable depth sonar (VDS), which greatly increased the ranges at which submarines could be detected. The improved capabilities conferred by these innovations contributed to Canada's NATO allies giving the RCN an expanded anti-submarine role in the North Atlantic. Much of the RCN's experimental work in these fields was conducted in conjunction with the Defence Research Board, and it would later include experiments leading to the development of the fastest warship ever built, the 60-knot (110 km/h) HMCS Bras d'Or.

The RCN also expanded and improved its aviation capabilities during much of this period. While it had provided crews for the British aircraft carriers HMS Nabob and HMS Puncher during the Second World War, and Canadians had served in the Royal Navy's Fleet Air Arm, Canada had no carriers of its own until HMCS Warrior entered Canadian service in 1946. Warrior proved unsuitable for North Atlantic winters, however, and was replaced by HMCS Magnificent in 1948. By the mid-1950s, Magnificent was no longer used as an active aircraft carrier, but was used as a vehicle transport during Canada's peacekeeping response to the 1956 Suez Crisis, before being paid off. Her replacement, HMCS Bonaventure, was a more modern aircraft carrier which had been substantially rebuilt to accommodate an angled flight deck and other improvements. During this time, the RCN also used stations at HMCS Shearwater and HMCS Patricia Bay to operate carrier-based fighter and anti-submarine aircraft, including the British Supermarine Seafire and Hawker Sea Fury, and the American F2H Banshee, the RCN's only jet fighter. Anti-submarine aircraft included variants of the Fairey Firefly, the Grumman Avenger, and a version of the Grumman Tracker built by de Havilland Canada.

=== Unification ===
On 1 February 1968, the personnel of the Royal Canadian Navy, along with those of the Royal Canadian Air Force and the Canadian Army, were transferred to the new, unified Canadian Forces, established under separate legislation, the National Defence Act. The naval forces were restructured as Canadian Forces Maritime Command (MARCOM), with Fleet Air Arm units being transferred to the Canadian Forces Air Command (AIRCOM).

For many of the serving naval personnel, the transition – giving up the old ensigns, and even more the adoption of army-type ranks and green uniforms instead of the distinctive naval ones – was a very painful process. Researcher Alan Filewood recalls:

I grew up in a navy family; my father was a regular force officer who had risen from the lower deck, and he was himself the son of a petty officer who had come to Canada as one of the British Royal Navy crews that brought Canada's first warships to this country in 1911 and elected to stay to build the RCN. Growing up in a naval family, I was imbued with the traditions of a service that prided itself on its British roots.

I recall vividly the day the armed forces paraded in Ottawa to witness the lowering of the old service ensigns and the raising of the new. My mother was a naval vet, a former WREN, and at this transformative moment of national symbolism, she wept; with the lowering of the White Ensign something disappeared from her history. Sometime later my father came home demoralized in his new army-style uniform with an army rank. Like many other naval officers, he retired soon thereafter.

The controversy included the dismissal of Rear-Admiral William Landymore, senior officer in the Atlantic, who tried to secure commitments that naval traditions would be maintained, but was later fired by Defence Minister Paul Hellyer for his opposition to the changes.

MARCOM was formed on 7 June 1965 as part of the integration reorganization of the services into six functional commands. The Canadian Forces Reorganization Act was given Royal Assent on 1 February 1968 and the Royal Canadian Navy ceased to exist as a separate service. The headquarters for MARCOM was based at CFB Halifax.

Canadian sailors exchanged their RCN uniforms for a rifle-green uniform common to all services (known as "CF green") and adopted an army-based rank structure. Only cap and collar badges identified "naval" personnel. These policies were somewhat reversed in the 1970s when MARCOM returned to a naval-based rank structure. In 1985 the Canadian Armed Forces introduced its distinctive environmental uniforms (DEUs) for its three environmental commands. The new naval uniform was broadly similar to the former RCN uniform except that officers' uniforms contained six rather than eight buttons on the front of the tunic and the "square rig" for other ranks was not re-introduced. In addition, the executive curl on officers' rank insignia was omitted and the rank insignia of other ranks continued to follow the pattern used by the army.

The 1968 unification of the Canadian Armed Forces was the first time a nation with a modernized military had combined sea, land, and air branches into a unified-command structure. The move also saw the fleet air arm of the RCN become the Maritime Air Group. These air units were eventually placed under the Canadian Forces Air Command (AIRCOM) after that command was created in 1975.

In the mid-1990s, MARCOM headquarters were consolidated from Halifax at NDHQ in Ottawa at the same time that AIRCOM headquarters moved from Winnipeg and LFC headquarters moved from Saint-Hubert, Quebec.

=== Re-structure ===
Following the 1968 unification, MARCOM undertook several changes to its force structure. The sole remaining aircraft carrier, HMCS Bonaventure, was nearing the end of her service life, being a Second World War–era vessel. In the early 1970s, it was decided to pay Bonaventure off and not find a replacement, instead focusing on the traditional blue-water navy.

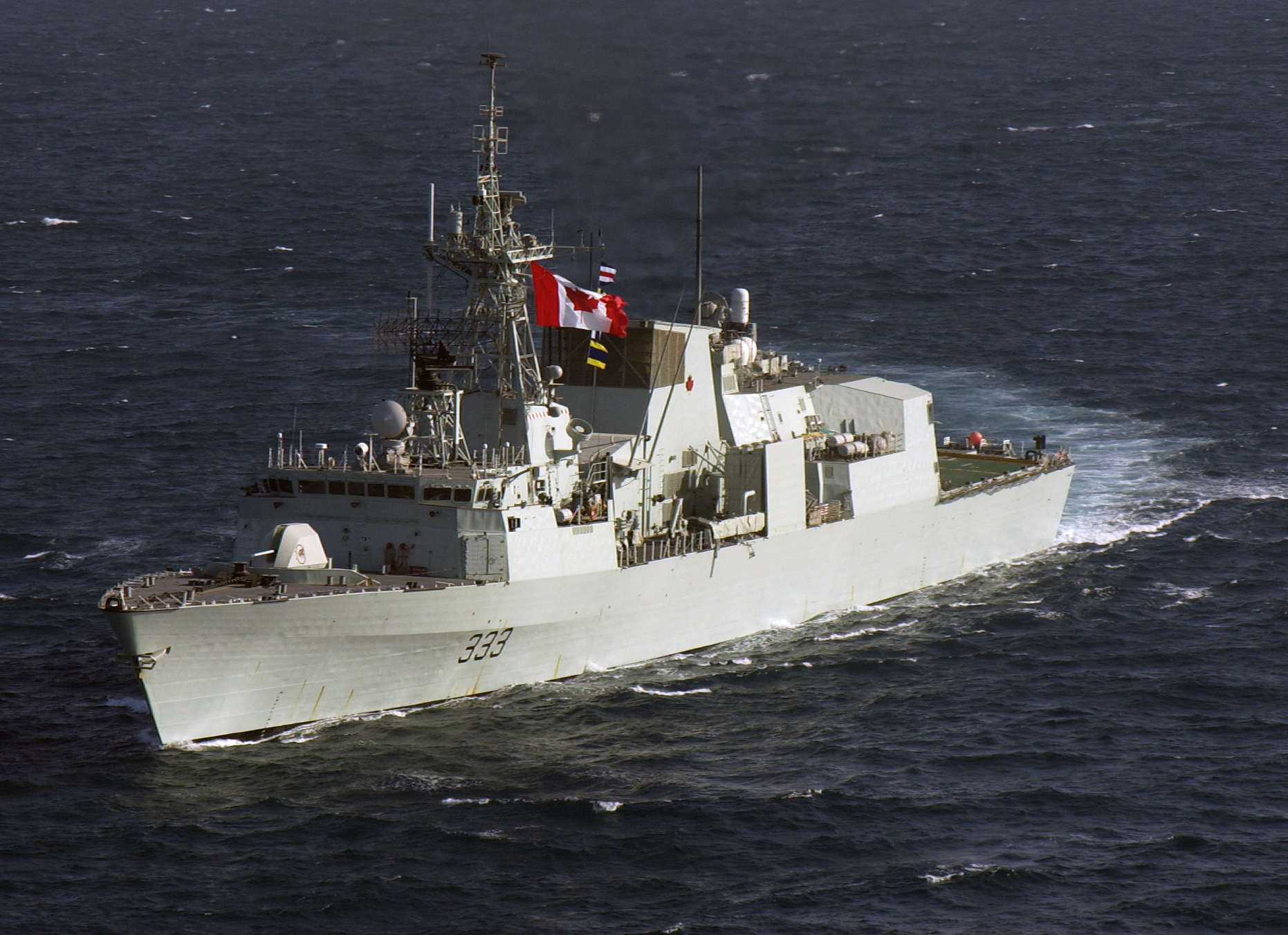
HMCS Toronto was one of 12 Halifax-class frigate constructed for the service from the late–1980s to 1990s.

The fleet was enhanced in 1972 with the addition of the four new Iroquois-class destroyers, also known as the Tribal class. By the mid-1970s, the navy was looking at a new class of frigate-helicopter (FH) vessels to replace the aging St. Laurent, Restigouche, Mackenzie, and Annapolis classes. This design evolved into the Canadian Patrol Frigate (CPF), which was promised by the government in the early 1980s during a period of increased military spending. By the late 1980s, with construction of the first six vessels underway (by now called the Halifax-class frigates), construction of six further vessels was announced. Nine of the twelve CPF vessels were built at Saint John, New Brunswick, and the remaining three were built at Lauzon, Quebec.

The mid-1980s saw the announcement of the Tribal Update and Modernization Program (TRUMP), which saw the four early-1970s Iroquois-class destroyers updated into area air-defence destroyers. The update saw these vessels become the first non-US ships to carry the Standard SM-2 anti-aircraft missile.

The 1990s saw the addition of the Kingston-class coastal defence vessels which enhanced MARCOM's minesweeping and route survey capabilities. Crewed by naval reservists, the Kingston class is also used for training.

=== Fleet rationalization ===
In 1977, the Maritime Command recommended structure based on a fleet consisting of 24 destroyers and frigates, three submarines, three support ships, 36 long range patrol aircraft and 45 maritime helicopters. Despite a realistic fleet structure at the time, the Progressive Conservative minority government led by Joe Clark offered an expensive vision. The Conservative party wanted an expensive fleet structure consisting of 16 destroyers and frigates, 20 submarines, 13 minesweeping vessels, 12 fast attack craft, three escort merchant vessels, 36 long range patrol aircraft, 45 maritime helicopters and 84 shore-based attack aircraft. In 1984, DND requested a revision during the "Capabilities Planning Guide", which included a largely status quo fleet consisting of a 24 destroyers and frigates, four submarines, 12 mine clearance vessels, three support ships, 18 long range patrol aircraft, 18 medium range patrol aircraft and an unspecified number of maritime helicopters. In 1985 the Centre for Military and Strategic Studies recommended a fleet consisting of four nuclear submarines, three helicopter carriers, eight patrol vessels, four polar icebreakers and many helicopters and patrol aircraft.

In 1987, a defence White Paper suggested Canada purchase nuclear-powered submarines (SSN) and specifically the Trafalgar-class submarine. However the plans for the submarines fell through due to cost. After the collapse of the Soviet Union and the reorganization of the Russian Navy in 1991, the Maritime Command plan to maintain the capacity to defend the Canadian interest in the region was based on a fleet consisting of four destroyers, 18 frigates, six submarines, three supply ships and 12 minesweeping vessels. The plan was scrapped and re-evaluated in 1993, since the original plan could not be met with the money the government had provided at the time.

=== Action post-1968 ===
On 23 October 1969 at 8:21 AM HMCS Kootenay suffered the worst peacetime accident in the history of the RCN during routine full-power trials when her starboard gearbox reached an estimated temperature of 650 degrees Celsius and exploded. The explosion and the ensuing fire killed 9 crew members and injured at least 53 others. (Note: The captain reported 7 killed, 9 medically evacuated, and 1 missing. However the final death toll was 9 killed. The 8th man killed was missing in the engine room until mid-afternoon. The 9th man killed died of smoke inhalation onboard HMCS Bonaventure two days after the fire. See 10 page account of explosion aboard HMCS Kootenay See also the book We Are As One by LCdr (retd) Gordon Forbes.)

MARCOM provides vessels for Standing Naval Force Atlantic and for exercises off Norway in support of Canada's defence obligations for northern Scandinavia under the North Atlantic Treaty Organization (NATO), patrols the north Atlantic and Pacific oceans in support of Canadian sovereignty, and is tasked by NATO with anti-submarine patrols for the northwest Atlantic.

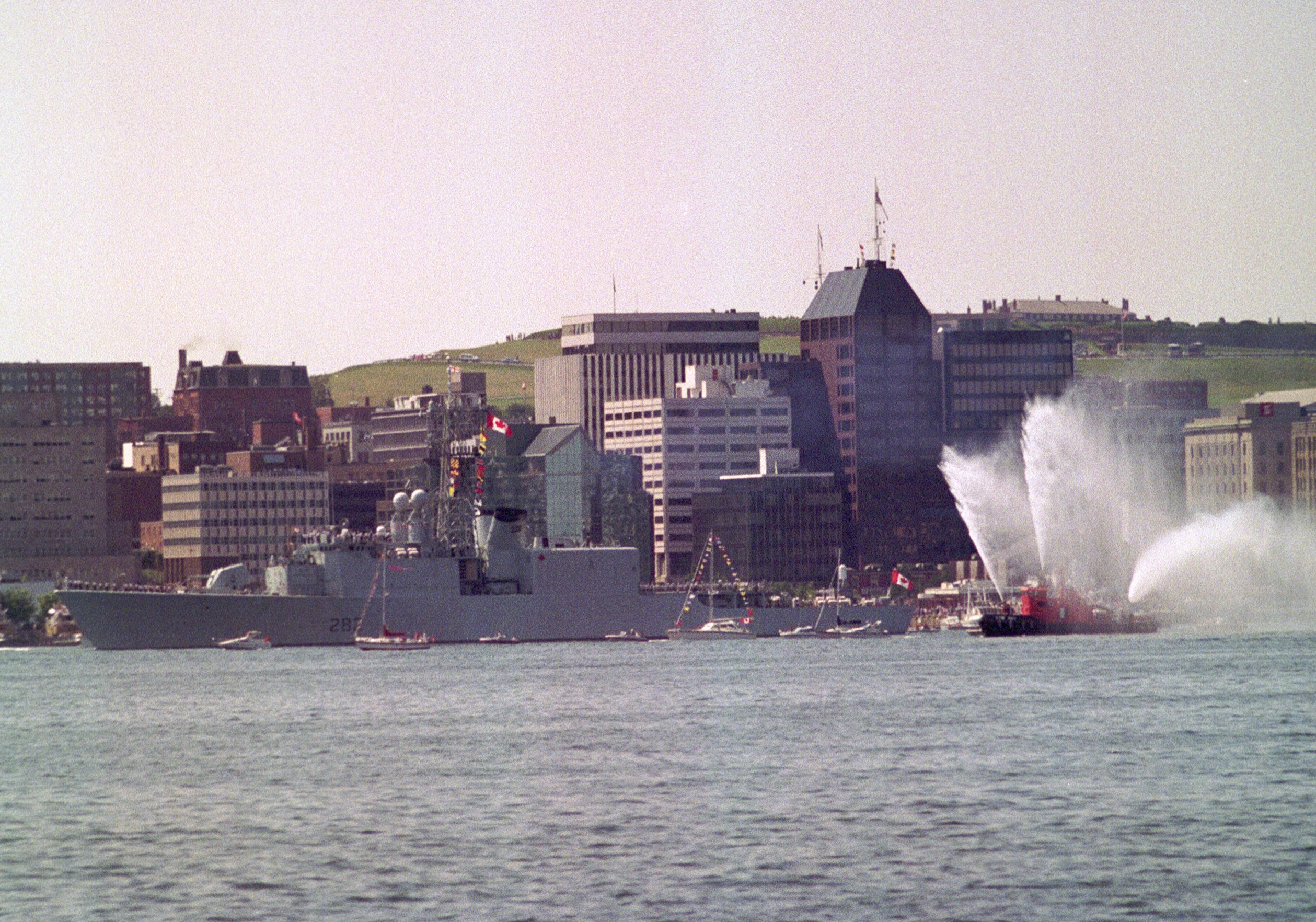
HMCS Athabaskan departs Halifax for the Persian Gulf as a part of Coalition forces, August 1990

In August–September 1990, MARCOM hurriedly modernized and deployed the Restigouche-class destroyer escort HMCS Terra Nova, the Iroquois-class destroyer HMCS Athabaskan, and the replenishment ship HMCS Protecteur to the Persian Gulf in support of Operation Desert Shield and later Operation Desert Storm, where the Canadian Navy led the coalition maritime support operation. HMCS Huron relieved the task force and was the first coalition ship to visit Kuwait City at the end of the war.

During the mid-to-late 1990s, MARCOM provided vessels for a NATO task force patrolling the Adriatic Sea off the former Yugoslavia. As part of Operation Apollo, Canada's military contribution to the international campaign against terrorism, 20 MARCOM vessels have been patrolling in the Arabian Sea in recent years.

In 1995, Canada was involved in a minor non-shooting skirmish with a few European countries in a conflict over fishing rights that was nicknamed the Turbot War.

On 4 May 2010, Senators William Rompkey and Hugh Segal announced their intention to introduce a motion into the Senate asking the Canadian Government to rename Maritime Command as the Canadian Navy, in order to recognize the Canadian Naval Centennial. As of May 2010, the executive curl on officers uniforms have been restored.

USS Ronald Reagan and other U.S. Third Fleet ships participated in the International Fleet Review commemorating the 100th birthday of the Royal Canadian Navy in Victoria, British Columbia. The naval review took place 9–12 June 2010, and it involved 21 naval ships and more than 8,000 naval personnel from Canada, France, Japan, Australia, New Zealand, and the United States. Joining Ronald Reagan for the naval review were the cruiser Chosin, the destroyer Sampson, and the frigate Ford.

On 29 June 2010, the Canadian Navy celebrated its 100th anniversary in Halifax, Nova Scotia. 18 vessels from several countries took part in the celebrations, including USS Wasp and HMS Ark Royal. The warships were reviewed by Queen Elizabeth II, the Duke of Edinburgh, and Prime Minister Stephen Harper.

As part of the Canadian navy's centennial celebrations, SONAR, the naval mascot, which is based on a Newfoundland dog, was "recruited" into the navy in 2010.

On 12 May 2011, HMCS Charlottetown came under fire by small craft off the coast of Libya. This was the first time that a Canadian naval vessel had been under hostile attack since the Korean War.

=== Legacy ===
What many think of as the modern Canadian Navy became known as the Canadian Forces Maritime Command (MARCOM) from February 1968 until August 2011. It was one of six functional commands which were formed under the integration reorganization of the Canadian services. The Royal Canadian Navy effectively ceased to exist 1 February 1968, when the Canadian Forces Reorganization Act was given Royal Assent. However, MARCOM, being the operational commander of the naval forces of Canada, was unofficially called the "Canadian Navy" and maintained many of the traditions of its predecessor. As the Canadian Monarch is the Commander-in-Chief of the Canadian military, commissioned Canadian naval ships, as units of the Canadian Armed Forces, use the prefix HMCS "Her/His Majesty's Canadian Ship/Submarine," a unit designation that began with the establishment of the Royal Canadian Navy and continued under the Canadian Forces. On 14 December 2010, the Canadian Senate passed a motion urging the federal government to change the name of Canada's naval force from Maritime Command to a title that included the word "navy." Both "Canadian Navy" and "Royal Canadian Navy" were considered acceptable.

The government announced on 16 August 2011, that Maritime Command was to regain its former name, the Royal Canadian Navy (along with the change of name of Air Command to Royal Canadian Air Force).

== Decommissioned fleet ==
Class or name	Type	Builder	Quantity	Year Entered Service	Details
St. Laurent class	escort destroyers	Canada; Canadian Vickers, Montreal; Halifax Shipyards, Halifax NS; Burrard, Vancouver, BC; Yarrows, Esquimalt, BC; Marine Industries Limited, Sorel, Quebec	7	1955–1994	all but 2 scrapped; Saguenay (Nova Scotia) and Assiniboine (Caribbean) were sunk as artificial reefs
Mackenzie class	escort destroyers	Canada; Canadian Vickers, Montreal	4	1962–1994	3 were sunk with 2 as artificial reefs; Qu'Appelle's status is unknown, but ship has been scrapped.
Restigouche class	escort destroyers	Canada; Davie Shipbuilding, Lauzon, Quebec; Halifax Shipyards, Halifax NS; Burrard Dry Dock, North Vancouver, BC; Victoria Machinery Depot, Victoria, BC	7	1958–1997	St Croix, Gatineau and Terra Nova were scrapped and rest sunk as reefs
Iroquois class	escort destroyers	Canada; MIL Davie Shipbuilding, Lauzon, Quebec	3	1970–2005	Huron sunk as a target ship off the coast of BC in 2007. Algonquin sold for scrapping. Iroquois awaiting disposal
Oberon class	diesel electric submarine	United Kingdom; Vickers-Armstrongs, Barrow-in-Furness	3 (+2 spares)	1964–2000	two sold to museums in Rimouski, Quebec and Port Burwell, Ontario, the spare purchased for parts was scrapped, other spare to be scrapped, one others remain laid-up at Dartmouth jetty, across from main naval base
Tench class	diesel electric submarine	United States; Portsmouth Naval Shipyard, Kittery, Maine	1 ( USS Argonaut (SS-475) renamed as HMCS Rainbow (SS-75) )	1968–1974	returned to US to be scrapped
Provider class	AOR (oiler replinishing ship)	Canada; Davie Shipbuilding, Lauzon, Quebec	1 – HMCS Provider (AOR 508)	1963–2003	sold as barge and latter scrapped
Protecteur class	AOR (oiler replinishing ship)	Canada; Saint John Shipbuilding, Saint John, New Brunswick	1	1969–2015	Protecteur sold for scrapping
N/A	ASL	Italy; Aspa Quarto	1 – HMCS Cormorant	1978–1997	Awaiting disposal
Annapolis class	escort destroyers	Canada; Marine Industries Limited, Sorel, Quebec	2	1964–1997	both sunk; Annapolis is a reef and Nipigon sunk in Quebec
Majestic class	light aircraft carrier	United Kingdom; Harland and Wolff, Belfast	1 – HMCS Bonaventure (CVL 22)	1957–1970	scrapped in Taiwan
Cape class	escort maintenance	Canada; Allied Shipbuilders Ltd., Vancouver, BC	2	1959–1970	status unknown
N/A	escort hydrofoil frigate	Canada; Marine Industries Limited, Sorel, Quebec de Havilland Canada, Toronto, Ontario	1 – HMCS Bras d'Or (FHE 400)	1970s	now at Musée Maritime du Québec
Glen-class I tugs	tug		4 – Glendevon, Glenevis		WWII ships
YBZ-61	vacuum ship		1		
Saint-class deep sea tugs	ocean tug	Saint John Dry Dock, Saint John, NB 1957 Canada	3 – St. Anthony ATA 531, St. John ATA 532, St.Charles ATA 533		stricken beginning in 1972
Naval Research Vessel			1 – CFAV Endeavour		1968–1998
	Submersible	1 - SDL-1 SDL-1; built by International Hydrodynamics Corporation of Vancouver, BC		1971–1998	sold in 1998

=== Retired aircraft ===
Aircraft	Country of Manufacture	Type	Canadian Designation	In Service	Notes
F2H Banshee	McDonnell Douglas United States	carrier based jet fighter	N/A – F2H-3	39; 34 on carrier HMCS Bonaventure	ex-United States Navy delivered 1955–1958; retired 1962; 3 survive as museum pieces all others scrapped
S-2 Tracker	Sikorsky Aircraft United States	Anti-submarine warfare aircraft	CS-2F Tracker	99	delivery 1956–1957; all carrier based aircraft were transferred to land operations after 1970; 1 restored all others scrapped
Sikorsky H-19 "Horse"	Sikorsky Aircraft United States	plane guard helicopter	H04S-3	2?	acquired 1956; retired 1967 and replaced by CH-124 Sea King (until 1970); 1 on display at CFB Shearwater

== Ensigns and jacks ==
1910–1911

1911–1965

1965–2013; used as a naval jack since 2013

2013–present; used as a naval jack prior to 2013

Naval ensigns used by the Royal Canadian Navy

On 3 March 1911, the RCN was authorized the use of the White Ensign, which remained the main identifying flag of the navy for the next 54 years. At the same time, the Canadian Blue Ensign was designated the jack of the RCN. However, because naval tradition dictates that the jack is worn at the ship's bow only when moored or on "dress ship" occasions, HMC ships normally had no distinctly Canadian flags when under way, the White Ensign being identical to the Royal Navy's ensign. Because of this, a tradition developed of painting a green maple leaf on ships' funnels to mark the ship as Canadian.

When British and Canadian foreign policies began to diverge in the 1950s (highlighted by the two countries' different roles in the Suez Crisis), having an ensign identical to the Royal Navy's became less satisfactory. In 1961, a policy of wearing the Canadian Red Ensign from the masthead (in addition to the Canadian Blue Ensign at the jack staff when appropriate, and the White Ensign at the ensign staff) was established. On 15 February 1965, the White, Blue, and Red ensigns were all replaced by the new National Flag of Canada, the Maple Leaf flag.

== RCN Roundel ==
Pre–1952

1952–1965

1965–1968

Roundels used by the Royal Canadian Navy

Shortly after the Second World War, Canadian military aircraft began using roundels featuring a red maple leaf. While the RCAF used a "silver maple" style, aircraft of the RCN used a roundel based on the sugar maple. In 1965, both the RCAF and RCN adopted the same roundel with the stylized leaf found in Canada's new flag.

Since 1975 there has been no roundel for the RCN as all aircraft used on board ships are operated by the Royal Canadian Air Force.

== Leadership ==
The Commander of the Royal Canadian Navy is the institutional head of the Royal Canadian Navy. The appointment was entitled Director of the Naval Service from 1910 to 1928 and then Chief of the Naval Staff from 1928 to 1964. In August 1964 the position of Chief of the Naval Staff was formally abolished when amendments to the National Defence Act came into force. Responsibility for naval matters was split between the newly established Defence Staff in Ottawa and operational headquarters in Halifax (for the Atlantic fleet) and Esquimalt (for the Pacific fleet). The appointment was entitled Commander of Maritime Command from 1966 to 1997 and Chief of the Maritime Staff from 1997 to 2011. In 2011 Maritime Command was renamed the Royal Canadian Navy at which time the appointment was renamed to its present incarnation.

== Heritage ==
This history of the Royal Canadian Navy is preserved and presented at the Maritime Command Museum in Halifax, the Canadian War Museum, the Naval Museum of Alberta, The Canadian Forces Base Esquimalt Naval and Military Museum and naval museums on several bases. Several RCN vessels have been preserved including the corvette HMCS Sackville, which serves as Canada's Naval Memorial, as well as the destroyer HMCS Haida and the auxiliary patrol ship HMCS/CSS Acadia which served the RCN in both the First and Second World Wars.

== Film and books ==
Films

- Corvette K-225 (1943), centres on the Royal Canadian Navy during the Second World War. Produced by Howard Hawks.
- Lifeline to Victory (1993), centers on the fictional corvette HMCS Fireweed. Fireweed undergoes many of the problems that the corvettes of the RCN experienced initially during the Second World War. Produced by Andrew Cochrane.

Books

- A Canadian Second World War Naval officer is one of the main characters in Jan de Hartog's novel The Captain.
- Corvette Navy and On The Triangle Run, the memoirs of LCdr James Lamb, MID, RCN (Ret.)
- Fading Memories, a collection of anecdotes, salty dips, and stories from members of the Royal Canadian Navy during the Second World War. Edited by Thomas G. Lynch.
- Frigates of the Royal Canadian Navy 1943-1974, a photographic history of specific classes of frigates in Canadian service. By Ken Macpherson.
- Haida, covering the Tribal-class destroyers of the RCN, by William Sclater.
- Hands to Flying Stations, a history of Canada's naval aviation from 1945 to 1954 (Volume One) and 1955 to 1969 (Volume Two), by naval aviator LCdr Stuart Soward, CD, RCN (Ret.)
- The Dark Broad Seas and The Thunder and the Sunshine, Volumes I and II respectively of "With Many Voices", the memoirs of RAdm Jeffry V. Brock, DSO DSC CD MID, RCN (Ret.), who retired shortly before the Unification of the Canadian Armed Forces.
- The Far Distant Ships, an official account of the Royal Canadian Navy's operations during the Second World War, by Joseph Schull.
- The Flying 400, dealing with the Royal Canadian Navy's prototype hydrofoil escort HMCS Bras d'Or, by Thomas G. Lynch.
- The Girls of the King's Navy, the memoirs of Rosamond 'Fiddy' Greer, who served in the WRCNS during the Second World War.
- The Persian Excursion, an account of Canada's naval involvement in the Gulf War by VAdm (Commodore at the time of publication) 'Dusty' Miller, CMM MSC Chief of Defense Staff Commendation CD, RCN (Ret.) and Sharon Hobson
- The RCN in Retrospect, 1910-1968, an examination of the Royal Canadian Navy from its inception to unification. Edited by James A. Boutilier
- The U-Boat Hunters, covering the Royal Canadian Navy's anti-submarine warfare against German submarines during the Second World War. By Marc Milner.
- Thunder in the Morning Calm, the memoirs of Edward C. Meyers of his service during RCN operations in the Korean War.

== See also ==
- Bibliography of Canadian military history
- List of aircraft of the Royal Canadian Navy
- List of current ships of the Royal Canadian Navy
- List of Royal Canadian Navy bases (1911–1968)
- List of ships of the Royal Canadian Navy
- Provincial Marine
- Uniforms of the Royal Canadian Navy

== Sources ==
- German, Tony (1990). The Sea is at Our Gates: The History of the Canadian Navy. Toronto: McClelland & Stewart. ISBN 0-7710-3268-4.
- Gimblett, Richard H., ed. (2009). The Naval Service of Canada 1910–2010: The Centennial Story. Toronto: Dundurn Press. ISBN 978-1-55488-470-4.
- Milner, Marc (2010). Canada's Navy: The First Century (Second ed.). Toronto: University of Toronto Press. ISBN 978-0-8020-9604-3.
