= Naval Service Act =

Statute creating the Canadian navy

The Naval Service Act
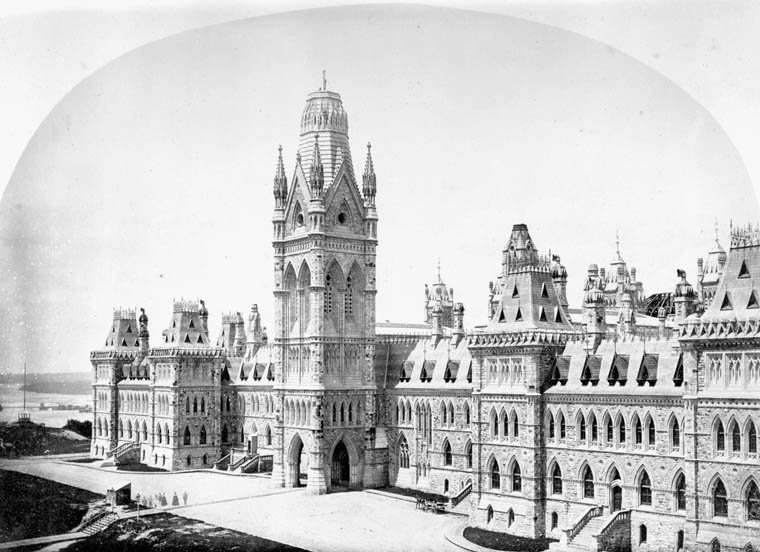

Parliament of Canada
- Long title: An Act respecting the Naval Service of Canada
- Citation: S.C. 1910, c. 43
- Enacted by: Parliament of Canada
- Assented to: May 4, 1910
- Bill citation: Bill 95, 11th Parliament, 2nd Session

Repealed by
- National Defence Act, SC 1950, c. 43, s. 250
- Status: Repealed

The Naval Service Act (French: Loi du service naval) was a statute of the Parliament of Canada, enacted in 1910. The act was put forward by the Liberal government of Prime Minister Sir Wilfrid Laurier to establish a Canadian navy. Prior to the passage of the act, Canada did not have a navy of its own, being dependent on the British Royal Navy for maritime defence.

After the passage of the Naval Service Act, the Naval Service was established on May 4, 1910. the initiation of this act was a direct response to the naval arms race that was happening between Britain and Germany. Also, Britain supported this act because it was worried over the expansion of the German Navy. By the end of 1910, the Naval Service's first vessels were inaugurated, two former British Royal Navy vessels. The act also established the Naval Reserve and the Naval College. The Naval Service became known as the Royal Canadian Navy in 1911.

The act intended to provide Canada with a separate naval force, but one that, if needed, could be placed under British control during a time of war. French-Canadian nationalists and British-Canadian imperialists both opposed the act, although for different reasons. The controversy of the naval question was a contributing factor to the defeat of Laurier's government in the federal election of 1911. The new Conservative government, led by Prime Minister Sir Robert Borden, instead proposed the Naval Aid Bill which funded three battleships or cruisers, to be put at the service of the British navy. However, the Naval Aid Bill was three times as expensive without any benefit to Canadian industries, plus it could threaten Canadian autonomy. Although it passed the House of Commons after closure was invoked, it was defeated in the Senate by the Liberal majority. Thus the Naval Service Act remained in force, with amendments and modifications, until being repealed and replaced by the National Defence Act in 1950.

== Background ==
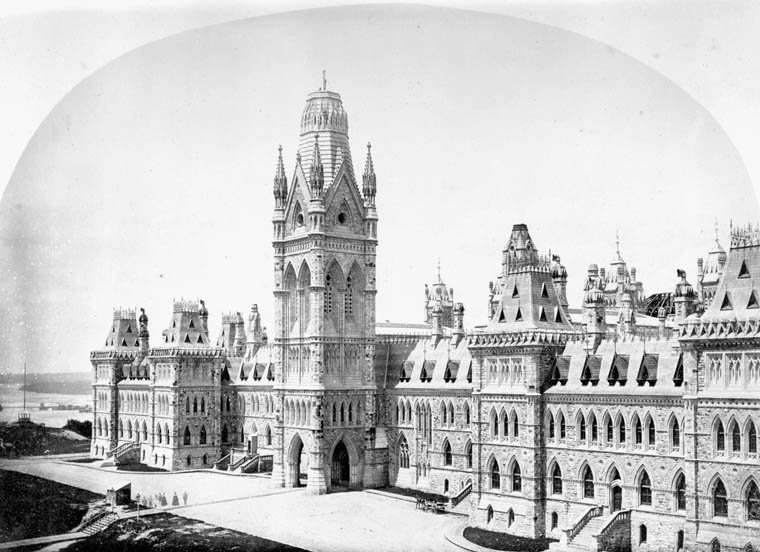
Image of the old Centre Block of the Canadian Parliament (neo-Gothic architecture, with tower)

After the Canadian Confederation, naval army was a priority to the Dominion of Canada. Many naval battles happened in the Canadian waters such as between the British and French ships. Also, during the war between the British and Americans ships, Canadian waters were distributed. This indicates that The Dominion of Canada must be able to defend itself if a sea battle occur near its shores, which made it a priority in that time. The navy force began to be needed in the 1880s with fisheries disputes with the Americans. Britain had its own political concerns and did not want to be involved with protecting Canadian shores after the Canadian Confederation. Also, Britain did not want to anger the U.S. and break the relationship with them. As a result, Britain withdrew their military troops and left some ships to protect their interest in Halifax. Canada was left to no other choice but to create their own navy for protection against the U.S.

Britain's fear that Germany's navy would catch up to its Royal Navy has been coined as the "Dreadnought crisis". At the 1909 Imperial Conference, British officials requested help from the Dominion prime ministers, concerning its navy. This request imposed upon Prime Minister Sir Wilfrid Laurier what became known as his "naval question".

== Bill ==
=== Introduction of the bill ===
The proposal of the Naval Bill was for a naval force of 11 ships costing $3 million annually. As a result, the House of Commons was split. some of them preferred to contribute the money to the Royal Navy (Britain government) for them to benefit from the money and create more ships. Others favoured having a separate Canadian navy in order for better protection and to not depend on other countries for protection. It was important to initiate a Canadian naval force in order change the picture of Canada and can defend itself against predators. However, the Naval Service Bill passed on the third reading in the House of Commons.

=== Laurier's compromise ===
Laurier's compromise was the Naval Service Act, which was introduced in January 1910. It set up the Department of Naval Services, which would operate a small Canadian Navy. Canada's navy was to be controlled by Ottawa, but during times of war it could be put under British control. Under this new act, Canada was to construct a naval college that was capable of training Canadian naval officers. This Naval College was constructed in 1910 in the city of Halifax, Nova Scotia. It also proposed under the act that Canada would order the construction of five cruisers and six destroyers in order to create its own navy.

=== Opposition ===
Within Canada itself, the Naval Service Act was very controversial. The act was strongly criticized by both French Canadian nationalists and English Canadians. Imperialistic-minded Canadians claimed that Canada was doing too little or was not showing enough loyalty to Britain. Conservatives famously dubbed Laurier's new policy as the “Tin Pot Navy”. The act was highly criticized by French Canadian nationalists, led by Henri Bourassa. Bourassa felt that the establishment of a Canadian navy that could be placed under British control was even worse than transferring cash to the British Admiralty, and that Canada risked being dragged into every British war. In addition, the French-Canadian nationalists were concerned that the navy would mean conscription for the Canadian people.

Robert Borden's Conservatives and Henri Bourassa's Quebec nationalists were against the Naval Bill. This is because many Conservatives claimed that the money would be spent on the Canadian Navy could go as a direct cash contribution to the British government. This would help by constructing more ships for the British government which will increase the defence rate to the Canadian shores. On the other hand, Bourassa argued that the initiation of a Canadian navy would serve better for British interests but not Canada's and on the expense of the Canadian power and money.

=== British reaction ===
While the British Admiralty was initially disappointed that Canada's assistance was to come in the form of its own naval force instead of funding British dreadnoughts, they were willing to accept any form of assistance as opposed to none at all. To this end, the British authorized the transfer of two old cruisers to Canada. Canada's first naval ship arrived on October 17, 1910, in Halifax, Nova Scotia; it was the former Royal Navy cruiser HMCS Niobe. On November 7, the second ship HMCS Rainbow, which was also a former Royal Navy cruiser, arrived in British Columbia. These two cruisers were used mainly for training purposes.

== Aftermath ==
In the 1911 election, the loss of French-Canadian support for Laurier's Liberals played a secondary role in his party's defeat to the Conservatives, led by Robert Borden. The Liberals still captured a majority of seats in their traditional stronghold of Quebec but winning considerably fewer seats in that province compared to previous elections. Ultimately the Laurier government's Reciprocity agreement with the United States, which was introduced after the Naval Service Act, cost the Liberals heavily in Ontario, and thus the election.

In 1912, Borden tried to replace the Naval Service Act with the Naval Aid Bill, under which, instead of building or supplying ships, Canada would give $35 million in cash directly to the British Royal Navy. The Conservative proposal was at least three times more costly than the existing plan to construct a Canadian-operated fleet, and would reap no benefits to Canadian industries whatsoever. Laurier argued that such an expensive contribution threatened Canadian autonomy. This led to a considerably decline in support for the Conservative legislation, even among staunch Imperialists in Canada. The Naval Aid Bill passed the House of Commons, where Borden's Conservatives were in the majority, but was defeated by the Liberal-dominated Senate of Canada. Liberal senators dared Borden to call a snap election over the Naval Aid Bill, with an amendment stating, "That this House is not justified in giving its assent to this Bill until it is submitted to the judgment of the country." Borden decided to back down instead of modifying or reintroducing the Naval Aid Bill, so the Naval Service Act remained in effect.

With the outbreak of World War I in 1914, Canada found itself automatically at war with the Central Powers and the question of naval assistance quickly became a moot point. Any ships would have been built in British shipyards and with the onset of war, Britain was building all that it could. Canada thus became focused upon its own war effort.

Even without a Canadian contribution, the Royal Navy remained significantly larger and more powerful than their German opponent. Even before the outbreak of war, Germany had essentially abandoned its effort to match the Royal Navy and redirected the bulk of its resources to strengthening the army. The strength of the British navy, combined with the strength of the French Navy and later bolstered by the entry of Italy and the United States on the Allied side, ensured that Allied control of the Atlantic sea lanes was never seriously threatened and compelled Germany to pursue less costly alternatives, submarines, in particular, to project a measure of power on the high seas.

In the Pacific, British and Canadian interests were assisted by having Japan as an ally. During World War I, the Imperial Japanese Navy had a North American Task Force.

== Revision and repeal ==
The Naval Service Act remained in force under the Conservative government and after the conclusion of World War I. A new, revised version of the act was enacted in 1944, during World War II. The act was subsequently repealed by the National Defence Act, enacted in 1950, which brought all of the Canadian armed forces under one statute.

== See also ==
- 100th Anniversary of the Canadian Navy, memorial in Victoria, British Columbia
- History of the Royal Canadian Navy
- Origins of the Royal Canadian Navy

== Sources ==
- Berger, Carl “Imperialism and Nationalism, 1884-1914: A Conflict in Canadian Thought” R. Douglas Francis and Donald B. Smith Readings in Canadian History Toronto: Nelson/Thompson 2006
- Bercusion, David J. and J. L Granastein The Collins Dictionary of Canadian History Toronto: Collins 1988
- Bercusion, David J. and J. L Granastein, Dictionary of Canadian Military History, Toronto: Oxford University Press, 1992
- Francis, R. Douglas, Richard Jones and Donald B. Smith, Destinies: Canadian History Since Confederation, Scarborough Ontario: Nelson/Thompson 2004
- Gough, Barry M. Historical Dictionary of Canada, London: Scarecrow Press, 1999
- Hill, Brian, Canada A Chronology and Fact Book, New York, Oceana 1973
- Myers, Jay, Canadian Fact and Dates, Markham Ontario: Fitzhenrt and Whiteside, 1986
