= HMS Charybdis (1859) =

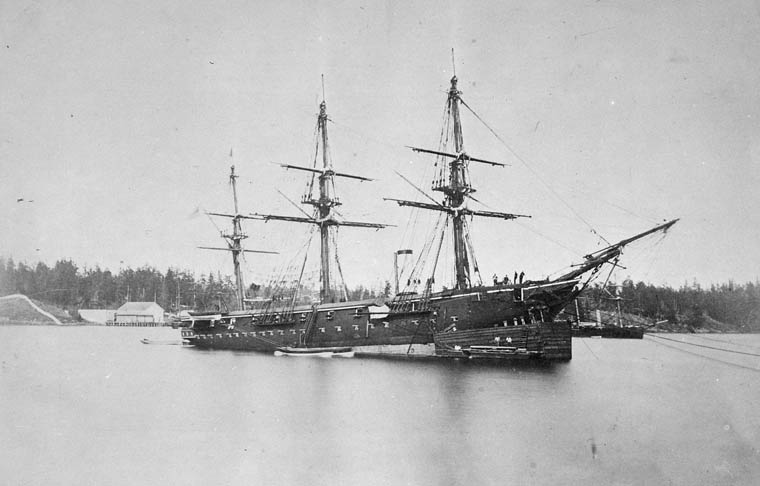
- HMS Charybdis at under refit at Esquimalt, 1870

History

United Kingdom
- Name: HMS Charybdis
- Ordered: 3 April 1854
- Builder: Chatham Dockyard
- Laid down: 29 March 1856
- Launched: 1 June 1859
- Completed: By 19 November 1860
- Decommissioned: 1880
- Fate: Sold at Halifax, Nova Scotia in 1884

General characteristics
- Class & type: Pearl-class corvette
- Displacement: 2,231 long tons (2,267 t)
- Tons burthen: 1462 bm
- Length: 225 ft 3 in (68.66 m) oa; 200 ft (61 m) (gundeck)
- Beam: 40 ft 4 in (12.29 m)
- Draught: 17 ft 4 in (5.28 m) (forward); 19 ft 10 in (6.05 m) (aft)
- Depth of hold: 23 ft 11 in (7.29 m)
- Installed power: 400 nominal horsepower; 1,540 ihp (1,150 kW)
- Propulsion: 2-cyl. horizontal single expansion; Single screw
- Sail plan: Full-rigged ship
- Speed: 11.2 knots (20.7 km/h) (under steam)
- Armament: 20 × 8-inch (42cwt) muzzle-loading smoothbore cannons on broadside trucks; 1 × 8-inch/68pdr (95cwt) muzzle-loading smoothbore cannon pivot-mounted at bow

HMS Charybdis was a 21-gun Royal Navy Pearl-class corvette launched on 1 July 1859 at Chatham Dockyard.

She served on the East Indies Station and the China Station between 1860 and 1861. She sailed to Esquimalt, Vancouver Island in early 1862 joining the Pacific Station. She served at the Pacific Station until 1867, when she was assigned to the Australia Station arriving in March 1867. She left the Australia Station in November 1868 and returned to the Pacific Station in early 1869. On 30 March, she was driven ashore. Repairs cost £843.

As part of the Royal Navy's 1869 Flying Squadron, she visited a number of ports in South America, Australia and Japan before returning to Esquimalt. On 23 February 1870, Charybdis ran aground between Blunden Islet and (South) Pender Island, Colony of British Columbia. Repairs cost £227. Nobody was found to be to blame for the grounding. In 1870 she sailed to Plymouth for refit. In 1873 she was assigned to the China Station and conducted anti-piracy patrols in the Straits of Malacca. During the Southern Malayan state disputes in 1874, she in conjunction with HMS Hart kept the peace. In February 1875, she ran aground on the Meander Shoal, off Singapore, Straits Settlements. She was refloated with the assistance of a number of tugs.

In October 1880, she was lent to the Canadian government as a training ship, until returned by Canada in 1882. She was sold at Halifax, Nova Scotia in 1884 for breaking up.
