= Greater Victoria Harbour Authority =

Non-profit organization in Victoria, British Columbia, Canada

The Greater Victoria Harbour Authority (GVHA) is a not-for-profit organization operating in Victoria, British Columbia, Canada. It was created in 2002 to own and operate several marine and upland properties in Victoria Harbour on their divestiture from the Government of Canada.

GVHA owns and operates the Ogden Point deep-water terminal, which is visited by more than 260 cruise ships bringing over 700,000 passengers each summer. The authority also operates Fisherman’s Wharf, several marinas, the Lower Causeway and Ship Point yacht facility in Victoria’s Inner Harbour.

The Authority serves several purposes. As well as efficient administration of divested former federal properties, it provides an opportunity for First Nations to have a say and to participate in the harbour economy.

The GVHA also promotes sustainable environmental practices on water and foreshore. In 2011, the authority joined Green Marine, an organization which promotes environmental awareness in the shipping industry.

The harbour authority represents the interests of several municipalities, organizations and First Nations. Member agencies of the harbour authority board are:

- City of Victoria
- Township of Esquimalt
- Capital Regional District
- Esquimalt Nation
- Songhees Nation
- Destination Greater Victoria
- Greater Victoria Chamber of Commerce
- Victoria/Esquimalt Harbour Society
