= HMCS Rainbow =

Two vessels of the Royal Canadian Navy have been named HMCS Rainbow, after the rainbow.

- HMCS Rainbow (1891), an Apollo-class protected cruiser operated by the Royal Navy from 1893 to 1909 as HMS Rainbow, transferred to Canada in 1910, and operated until 1920
- HMCS Rainbow (SS 75), a Tench-class submarine operated by the United States Navy from 1944 to 1968 as USS Argonaut (SS-475), sold to Canada in 1968, and operated until 1974

== See also ==
- HMS Rainbow, nine ships of the Royal Navy, including the first HMCS Rainbow
- USS Rainbow (AS-7), a distilling ship and submarine tender of the United States Navy
