= HMS Niobe (1897) =

Cruiser of the British (later Canadian) navy

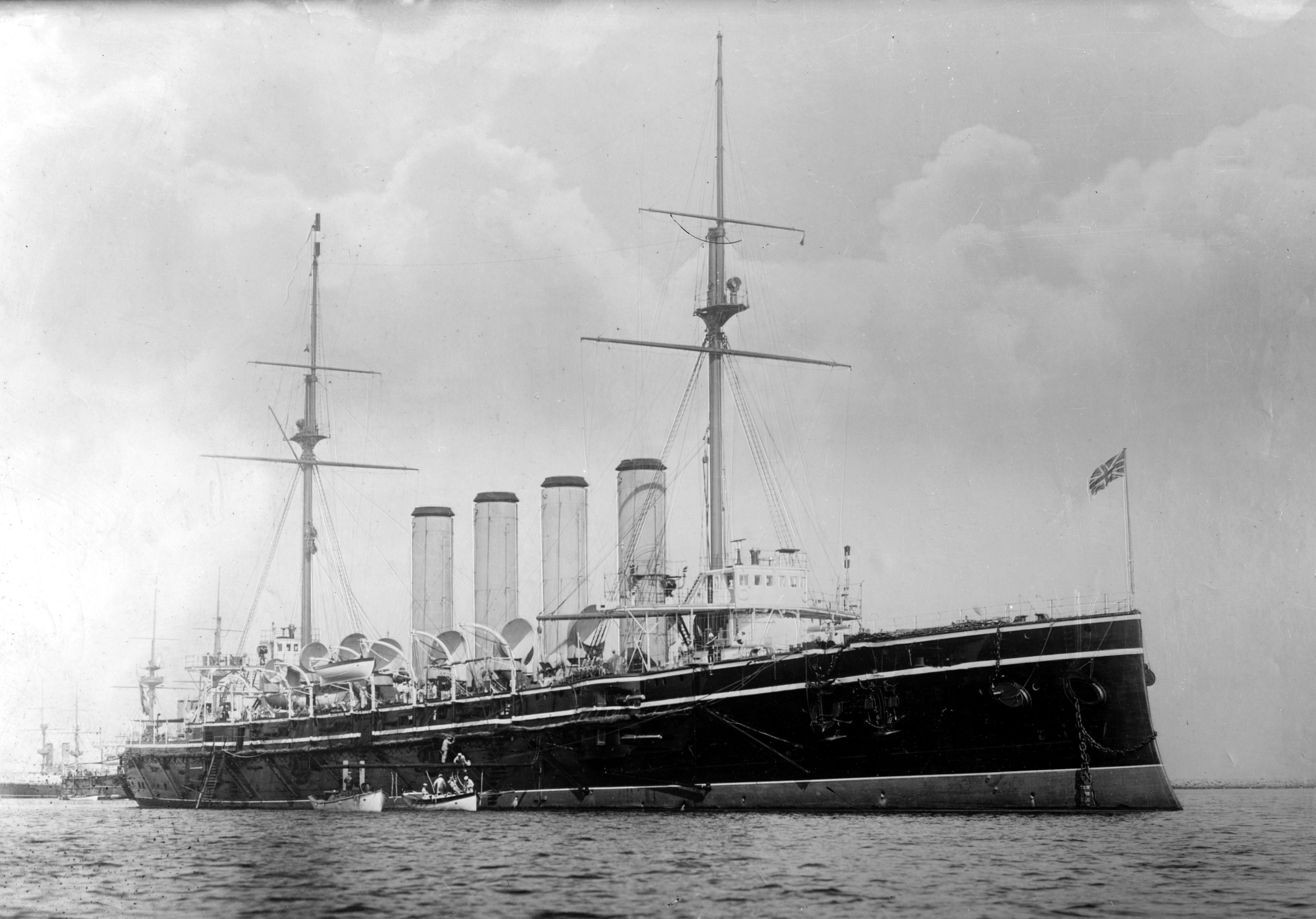
- HMS Niobe

History

United Kingdom
- Name: Niobe
- Namesake: Niobe
- Builder: Vickers Limited, Barrow-in-Furness
- Laid down: 16 December 1895
- Launched: 20 February 1897
- In service: 1898
- Fate: Transferred to Royal Canadian Navy on 6 September 1910

Canada
- Name: Niobe
- Acquired: January 1910
- Commissioned: 6 September 1910
- Out of service: 6 September 1915 to depot ship
- Stricken: 1920
- Home port: Halifax, Nova Scotia
- Fate: Broken up in 1922

General characteristics
- Class & type: Diadem-class protected cruiser
- Displacement: 11,000 long tons (11,177 t)
- Length: 435 ft (133 m); 462 ft 6 in (140.97 m) o/a
- Beam: 69 ft (21 m)
- Draught: 25 ft 6 in (7.77 m)
- Propulsion: 2 shaft triple expansion engines; 16,500 ihp (12,300 kW)
- Speed: 20.5 knots (38.0 km/h; 23.6 mph)
- Complement: 760
- Armament: 16 × single QF 6 in (152 mm) guns; 14 × single QF 12-pounder (76 mm) guns; 3 × single QF 3-pounder (47 mm) guns; 3 × 18 in (460 mm) torpedo tubes
- Armour: Casemates 6 in (152 mm); Decks 4.5–2 in (114–51 mm)

HMS Niobe was a ship of the Diadem class of protected cruisers in the Royal Navy. She served in the Boer War and was then given to Canada as the second ship of the newly created Naval Service of Canada as HMCS Niobe. The Naval Service of Canada became the Royal Canadian Navy in August 1911. The ship was nearly lost when she went aground off Cape Sable Island, Nova Scotia overnight 30–31 July 1911. Repairs were completed at the end of 1912 and the ship returned to service in late 1914. During the First World War, Niobe patrolled the approaches to the St. Lawrence River and then joined the Royal Navy's 4th Cruiser Squadron to patrol off New York City. The cruiser returned to Halifax, Nova Scotia on 17 July 1915 and never put to sea again. Niobe was paid off in September and served as a depot ship in Halifax. Damaged in the 1917 Halifax Explosion, she was sold for scrap and broken up in the 1920s.

== Design and description ==
The Diadem-class cruisers were reduced versions of the preceding Powerful class. The first four ships of the class, of which Niobe was one, displaced 11,000 long tons (11,000 t) and were 435 feet (133 m) long between perpendiculars and 462 feet 6 inches (140.97 m) overall. They had a beam of 69 feet (21 m) and a draught of 25 feet 6 inches (7.77 m). The first four cruisers of the class were propelled by two shafts powered by steam from 30 Belleville boilers driving a four-cylinder triple expansion engine that created 16,500 indicated horsepower (12,300 kW). This gave the ships a maximum speed 20.5 knots (38.0 km/h; 23.6 mph). The cruisers carried 1,900 long tons (1,900 t) of coal as fuel.

The Diadem-class were equipped with sixteen QF 6-inch (152 mm) guns. Four single-mounted guns with gun shields were placed on the forecastle and quarterdeck, while the remaining twelve were placed in casemates on either side of the ship. The foremost and aftermost guns on each side were mounted in two-story casemates, with the other eight in single-story casemates amidships. The class was criticised for the lack of heavier armament. The cruisers were given fourteen single-mounted QF 12 pounder 12 cwt naval guns and three single-mounted QF 3-pounder Hotchkiss guns. (Note: "Cwt" is the abbreviation for hundredweight, 20 cwt referring to the weight of the gun.) The cruisers also mounted three 18-inch (460 mm) torpedo tubes, one positioned above water in the stern and two submerged broadside.

The cruisers were given a 4–2 1/2-inch (102–64 mm) armoured deck and 2-inch (51 mm) armour for the ammunition hoists. The casemates and the 6-inch gun shields were given 4 1/2–2 inches (114–51 mm) armour and the conning tower, 12 inches (300 mm). The vessels had a complement of 677 in Royal Navy service.

== Career ==
Niobe was ordered as part of the 1895/96 Estimates and was laid down by Vickers Limited at their Barrow-in-Furness shipyard on 16 December 1895. The cruiser was launched on 20 February 1897, and commissioned on 6 December 1898.

She was part of the Channel Squadron at the outbreak of the Boer War (1899–1900), and was sent to Gibraltar to escort troop transports ferrying reinforcements to the Cape. On 4 December 1899, Niobe and HMS Doris rescued troops from SS Ismore, which had run aground. Niobe saw further action in the Boer War, escorting troops to Cape Town, and the Queen's South Africa Medal was subsequently awarded to the crew. She returned to the English Channel, but later escorted vessels as far as Colombo in Ceylon.

In March 1901 Niobe was one of two cruisers to escort HMS Ophir, commissioned as royal yacht for the world tour of the Duke and Duchess of Cornwall and York (later King George V and Queen Mary), from Spithead to Gibraltar, and in September the same year she again escorted the royal yacht from St Vincent to Halifax, Nova Scotia. She took part in the fleet review held at Spithead on 16 August 1902 for the coronation of King Edward VII, and the following month visited Souda Bay, Crete for combined manoeuvres with other ships of the Channel and Mediterranean stations. After a brief visit to Gibraltar in early October, she returned to Portsmouth to pay off at Devonport for a refit. From 1905 to 1909, Niobe was the flagship of the Rear-Admiral Reserve Squadron and was refitted in 1908. In April 1909, the cruiser was recommissioned into the 4th Division of the Home Fleet at Devonport and was paid off in September 1910.

=== Royal Canadian Navy ===
After a series of negotiations between Canada and the Admiralty over the composition of the newly formed Canadian Navy, the Canadians traded their desire for destroyers, of which none were available, for Niobe, which was to form the nucleus of the east coast fleet. The purchase was arranged in January 1910, and to make room for the cost of Niobe, £215,000, a flotilla leader was dropped from the list of requests. Niobe and HMS Rainbow were provided to the Dominion of Canada to seed the new Canadian navy. Payment for Niobe was deferred until after the vote on the naval service in the Canadian House of Commons. The Naval Service Act was opposed by the Conservative Party of Canada, then in the role of Official Opposition, pushing instead for Canada to make direct payments to support the Royal Navy. The governing Liberal Party of Canada held the majority of the seats in the Parliament however, and pushed ahead with the initiative to create a Canadian navy. Once terms of purchase were settled, the newly renamed HMCS (His Majesty's Canadian Ship) Niobe was transferred to Canada on 6 September 1910, commissioning at Devonport Dockyard. Before departing Great Britain, Niobe and Rainbow were altered in order to meet the requirement as training vessels for the nascent Canadian navy. This required the installation of new heating systems to operate in colder waters, an up-to-date galley and the latest in Marconi wireless.

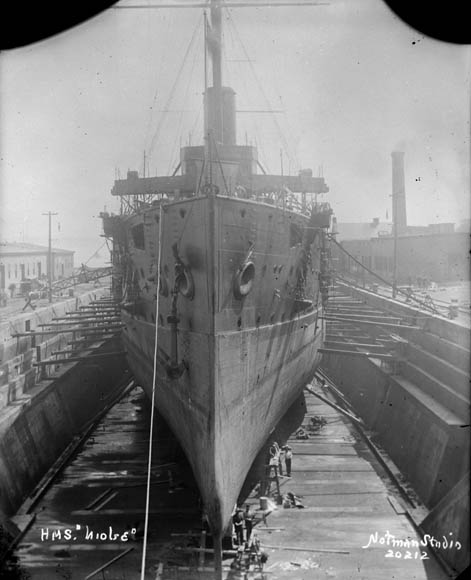
Niobe in drydock at Halifax

Niobe reached Halifax, Nova Scotia on 21 October that year, her entry into the harbour timed to coincide with Trafalgar Day. Formal transfer of the ship only took place on 12 November 1910, once she had been paid for. After commissioning, the status of the new Canadian vessels and their ability to operate independently of the Royal Navy arose and prevented the ships from leaving coastal waters until the matter was settled. This initially limited Niobe to training duties in Halifax and prevented her from making a tour of the Caribbean Sea.

After departing on a training cruise, Niobe ran aground in fog off Cape Sable, Nova Scotia, on the night of 30–31 July 1911. Damage control saved the ship. The repairs took six months, completing in January 1912, and she had a permanently reduced maximum speed as a result. The resulting court martial found that the navigating officer, Charles White, who had not been on the bridge, should have been present during the navigation of the area due to its difficulty, and also found Captain W. B. MacDonald negligent for not ensuring his officers were performing their duties properly.

Having been laid up after repair pending the arrival of the new government, Niobe's condition gradually deteriorated. She was effectively rotting at her berth in 1913. However, with the outbreak of the First World War, she was ordered to be brought up to an acceptable state of readiness for combat purposes. This was difficult as her crew had been sent west to Esquimalt when she was laid up. To fill in its crew, the sloops Shearwater and Algerine, which had passed into Canadian control, were paid off at Esquimalt, British Columbia and their crews sent east. In September 1914, to complete her complement, Niobe travelled to the Dominion of Newfoundland to pick up a contingent of 107 sailors from the Newfoundland Royal Naval Reserve.

After returning to operational status, Niobe was sent with HMS Lancaster to patrol the Gulf of Saint Lawrence. Following that from 11–13 September 1914, she escorted The Royal Canadian Regiment, aboard the transport Canada, to Bermuda, where they took up garrison duties. On her return journey the cruiser developed defects and required a week to repair. Those defects prevented the ship from escorting the large troop convoy carrying Canadian soldiers in October.

On 6 October 1914, Niobe joined the Royal Navy's 4th Cruiser Squadron on the North America and West Indies Station. She was engaged in intercepting German ships along the American coast until July 1915. During this period she chased the German raider SS Prinz Eitel Friedrich into Newport News, Virginia. After refuelling, the raider's captain opted for his vessel to be interned by the Americans instead of fighting the Niobe. As the patrol work continued Niobe began to wear out. Her final patrol was 4–17 July 1915, after which the cruiser returned to Halifax. Her funnels were found to be rapidly deteriorating, her boilers were worn and her bulkheads were in poor shape. As a result of being worn out, Niobe was paid off on 6 September 1915 to become a depot ship in Halifax.

While a depot ship Niobe housed the Halifax intelligence centre which used the ship's radio communication equipment. The ship's quarterdeck was covered and enclosed to provide extra office space.

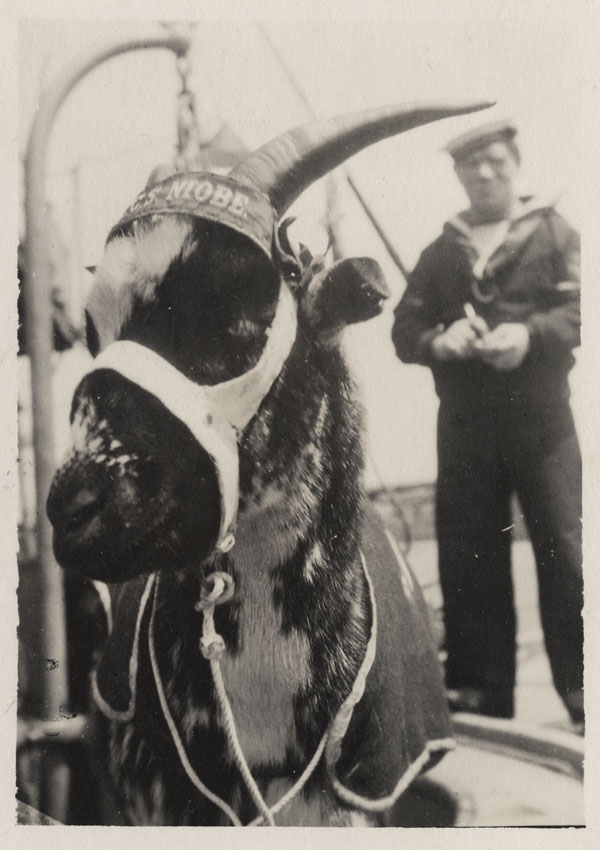
The mascot of HMCS Niobe

While Niobe's operational life was coming to an end, Vice-Admiral Kingsmill attempted to swap her back to the Royal Navy for a newer cruiser. However, the British only offered HMS Sutlej, a cruiser in a similar state of repair, and therefore nothing came of the exchange.

On 6 December 1917, the ammunition ship SS Mont-Blanc was rammed by the Norwegian merchant vessel SS Imo. The ramming caused Mont-Blanc to catch fire. Laden with tons of explosives, the ship was abandoned by her crew and left to drift through the harbour. Niobe was laid up in harbour at the time and the alarm was raised aboard the ship once the danger was known. Warrant Officer Albert Mattison and six men sailed to Mont-Blanc in Niobe's pinnace and boarded the ammunition ship in an effort to scuttle her. However, while the group was boarding, Mont-Blanc exploded, an event known as the Halifax Explosion, killing the seven men instantly. The explosion caused serious damage to Niobe's upper works, and the deaths of seven other crew members. It also caused her to be dragged from her moorings, despite the use of a concrete embedded anchor. Once re-secured, additional anchors were put in place. She remained in use as a depot ship until disposed of in 1920, and sold for scrap. She was broken up in 1922 at Philadelphia.

== Legacy ==
As the first large ship in the Royal Canadian Navy, Niobe's name has considerable symbolic importance in the Canadian navy, being used among other things as the title of a series of scholarly papers. Models and collections of artefacts of Niobe can be found at several Canadian museums including the Maritime Museum of the Atlantic and the Naval Museum of Halifax in Halifax. The latter devotes a room to Niobe which includes her original ship's bell. There is also a Royal Canadian Sea Cadet Corps located in Bridgewater, Nova Scotia that carries her name as RCSCC 62 NIOBE.

On 14 October 2014, an anchor believed to have belonged to Niobe was unearthed at HMC Dockyard in Halifax. The particular anchor, and the location it was discovered, is consistent with being from Niobe. The anchor is believed to be one of her three bow anchors used to secure her in her new position following the Halifax Explosion.

On 17 October 2014, Canada announced that 21 October will be recognised annually as "Niobe Day" to commemorate the ship's arrival in Halifax in 1910.
