= Naval Aid Bill =

Proposed Canadian bill to fund battleships

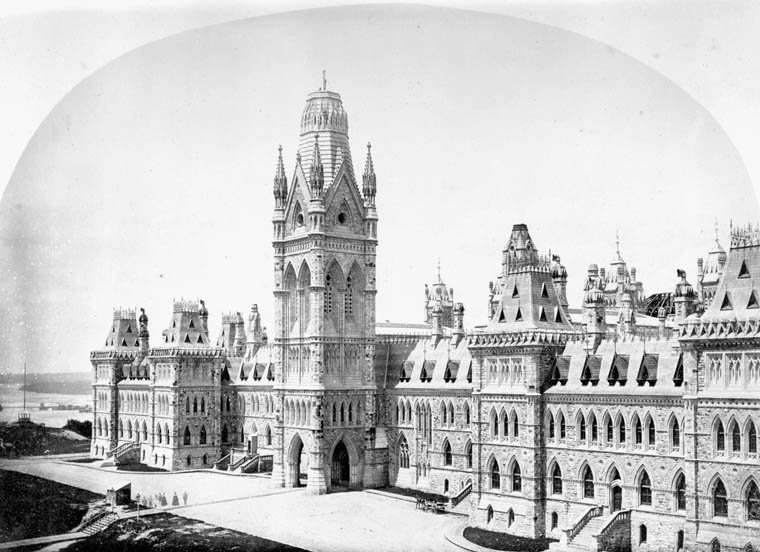
- Parliament of Canada buildings in 1913

Parliament of Canada
- Long title: An Act to authorize measures for increasing the effective naval forces of the Empire.
- Citation: Bill 21, 12th Parliament, 2nd Session
- Passed by: House of Commons of Canada
- Passed: May 15, 1913
- Considered by: Senate of Canada

Legislative history

First chamber: House of Commons of Canada
- Introduced by: Sir Robert Borden
- First reading: December 5, 1912
- Second reading: February 18 to 28, 1913
- Committee of the whole: February 28 to May 10, 1913
- Third reading: May 15, 1913

Second chamber: Senate of Canada
- Member(s) in charge: James Alexander Lougheed
- First reading: May 20, 1913
- Second reading: Defeated May 29, 1913

Related legislation
- Naval Service Act

Summary
- Bill to provide three battleships or cruisers to the British Royal Navy
- Status: Not passed

The Naval Aid Bill was a bill introduced in the House of Commons of Canada, by Conservative Prime Minister Sir Robert Borden on December 5, 1912. The bill proposed that the Canadian government spend $35,000,000 to build battleships or armoured cruisers, which Canada would make available to the British Royal Navy if needed for defence of the British Empire. Although the bill passed the Canadian House of Commons, where Borden had a majority government, it was defeated in the Senate, which had a Liberal majority.

== Background ==
The 1911 federal election, in which the Conservatives under Borden defeated the Liberal government of Sir Wilfrid Laurier, was fought partly on the question of what role Canada should play in the common defence of the British Empire. At the time, Britain was engaged in a naval arms race with the German Empire. While the Liberals and Conservatives both agreed that the best long-term maritime defence policy would be for Canada to acquire its own navy, the Conservatives vehemently objected to the policy of the former Liberal government, set out in the Naval Service Act. That Act, passed in 1911, had called for construction of a Canadian navy to begin immediately. As Opposition Leader, Borden had argued that Laurier’s plan to operate an autonomous fleet of five cruisers and six destroyers was a wholly inadequate response to the Empire's apparently pressing need.

As the new Prime Minister of Canada, Borden visited the United Kingdom in 1912 to accept the knighthood that was customarily granted at the time to Dominion Prime Ministers. While in the U.K., at the urging of the First Lord of the Admiralty Winston Churchill, Prime Minister Borden agreed to finance the construction of three dreadnought battleships or armoured cruisers for $35 million. The Conservative proposal was at least three times more costly than the existing plan to construct a Canadian-operated fleet, and would reap no benefits to Canadian industries. Laurier argued that such an expensive contribution threatened Canadian autonomy. This led to a considerable decline in support for the Conservative legislation, even among staunch Imperialists in Canada.

What was not yet well known within Britain or Canada was that by 1912 the German government had quietly scaled back its naval ambitions in favour of strengthening its army. The Germans had made this policy change in secret, and in any event the Admiralty strenuously downplayed reports that the Germans might have been giving up on their attempt to surpass the Royal Navy.

== Debates in Parliament ==
=== House of Commons ===
On December 5, 1912, Borden introduced the Naval Aid Bill in the House of Commons as a one-time contribution to Britain's navy.

The bill was short, only five sections long. It authorised the Canadian government to spend up to $35,000,000 for "the construction and equipment of battleships or armoured cruisers of the most modern and powerful type". Once completed, Canada would place them at the disposal of the King, "for the common defence of the Empire", on terms to be concluded between the Government of Canada and the British Government.

The debate on the bill in the House of Commons was long and bitter, often extending late into the night, and lasting for twenty-three weeks. The debate on second reading occupied ten days, from February 18 to 28, 1913. The Conservative government had a strong majority in the Commons, and passed the bill at second reading, by a vote of 114 to 84. The vote was held at close to 2 o'clock in the morning on February 28, 1913. The bill then progressed to the committee stage, which was in the Committee of the Whole. That format meant that every member of the House of Commons could speak repeatedly on the bill, and the opposition Liberals implemented a long filibuster. The committee stage began on February 28, 1913, and continued into May. On May 9, 1913, Prime Minister Borden moved closure on the debate, under a new rule of the House of Commons. It was the first time that closure had ever been invoked in the House of Commons. The bill passed the committee stage at 1 o'clock in the morning on May 10, 1913. It then went to third reading, and was passed by the House of Commons on May 15, 1913, by a vote of 101 to 68.

=== Senate ===
The bill then moved to the Senate. The Senate of Canada is an appointed body, not elected. Since Laurier had been in power from 1896 until 1911, his government had held the appointing power for fifteen years, and there was a strong Liberal majority in the Senate. On May 20, 1913, the Leader of the Government in the Senate, James Lougheed, introduced the bill on first reading. On May 20, 1913, the bill came on for second reading.

Senator Lougheed gave a lengthy speech, repeating the main arguments which the government members had advanced in the House of Commons. The Opposition Leader in the Senate, George William Ross, then spoke, repeating the positions advanced by the opposition in the House of Commons, and emphasising that both parties agreed on the need to support imperial defence. Ross argued that the Naval Service Act passed by the Laurier government was sufficient to do so. Ross then moved an amendment to the motion for second reading: "That this House is not justified in giving its assent to this Bill until it is submitted to the judgment of the country." The Senate voted on the amendment, which passed by a vote of 51 to 27. A second vote, on the motion for second reading, was then held, and the bill was defeated on the same numbers.

== Aftermath ==
As a result of the Naval Aid Bill being defeated by the Senate, the existing Naval Service Act therefore remained in effect.

Had the Naval Aid Bill passed the Senate and received royal assent, it is likely the funds would have been used to construct three Queen Elizabeth-class battleships, potentially named as Acadia, Quebec and Ontario. The bill's failure ultimately made little impact on the naval arms race. The First World War commenced about fourteen months after the bill's defeat. At the time, none of the five Queen Elizabeth class battleships that were ultimately built for the Royal Navy had yet been commissioned.

At the start of the war, Britain had 22 dreadnoughts in service compared to Germany's 15, but Britain also had 13 dreadnoughts under construction even without a Canadian contribution, and by then, the Germans were building only five additional dreadnoughts. With the additional naval strength of France in the Atlantic and Japan in the Pacific, later bolstered by the entry of Italy and eventually the United States, Allied control of the high seas was never seriously threatened and Germany was compelled to seek less costly alternatives (submarines in particular) to project a measure of power in the Atlantic sea lanes.
