= Harold Taylor Wood Grant =

Canadian admiral (1899–1965)

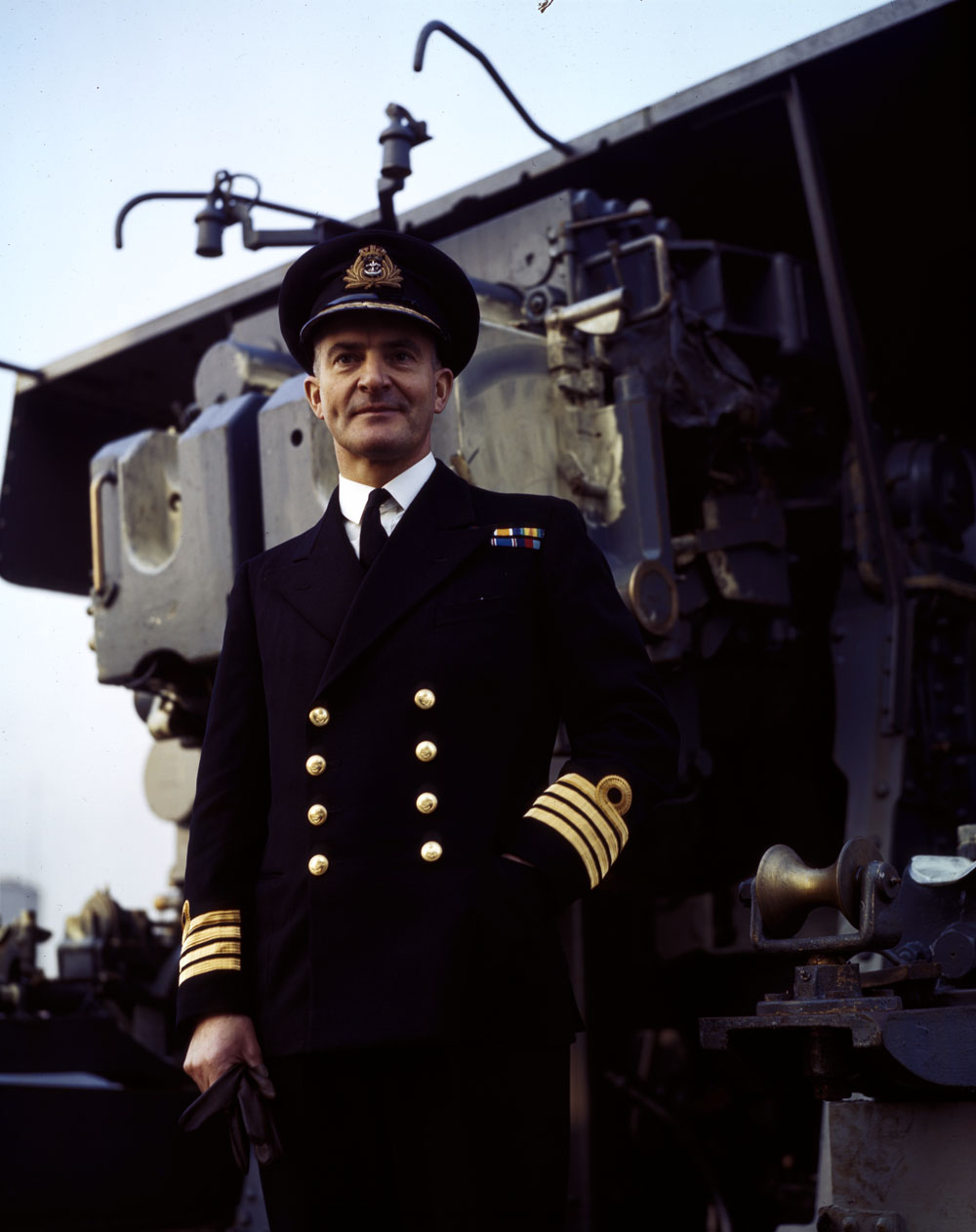
- Born: 16 March 1899; Halifax, Nova Scotia
- Died: 8 May 1965 (aged 66); Ottawa, Ontario
- Military career
- Allegiance: Canada
- Branch: Royal Canadian Navy
- Service years: 1914–1951
- Rank: Vice-Admiral
- Commands: Chief of the Naval Staff; HMCS Ontario; HMS Enterprise; HMS Diomede; HMCS Skeena
- Conflicts: First World War; Second World War; Battle of the Atlantic; Operation Stonewall; Battle of the Bay of Biscay; Invasion of Normandy
- Awards: Commander of the Order of the British Empire; Distinguished Service Order; Canadian Forces' Decoration; Mentioned in Despatches; Bronze Star Medal (United States)

Vice-Admiral Harold Taylor Wood Grant, CBE, DSO, CD (16 March 1899 – 8 May 1965) was a Canadian naval officer and a post-war Chief of the Naval Staff. The son of Lieutenant Governor of Nova Scotia, MacCallum Grant, Harold Grant entered the Royal Canadian Navy as a cadet in 1914. He spent most of the First World War in training until 1917, when he became a midshipman aboard a British Royal Navy ship. Considered an above average officer, he was earmarked for early promotion during the interwar period and by 1938, commanded the destroyer HMCS Skeena.

During the Second World War, Grant was sent to command the British cruisers HMS Diomede and HMS Enterprise as training in preparation for the Canadian acquisition of the ship type later in the war. During his time in command of Enterprise, he took part in the Battle of the Bay of Biscay, earning his Distinguished Service Order, the invasion of Normandy and bombardment of Cherbourg where he was wounded. He then commanded the Canadian cruiser HMCS Ontario until war's end.

Following the war, Grant served as a staff officer and deputy to the Chief of the Naval Staff, Howard E. Reid. Grant succeeded Reid as Chief of the Naval Staff on 1 September 1947, and was made vice admiral. He commanded the Royal Canadian Navy through the early years of the Cold War and the Korean War, during which a series of personnel unrest incidents, the restructuring of the navy, and the beginning of the anti-submarine warfare specialisation took place. Grant retired from the navy on 1 December 1951.

== Early life ==
Grant was born on 16 March 1899, in Halifax, Nova Scotia, to Lieutenant Governor of Nova Scotia MacCallum Grant and Laura MacNeill Parker Grant. He had one sister and five brothers, one of whom was John Moreau Grant. He studied at the Royal Naval College of Canada at Halifax from 1914 to 1917. As a cadet, Grant was often ill but considered of good character and graduated with a first-class certificate.

== Naval career ==
=== Early career ===
During the First World War, Grant was sent to the British Royal Navy for further training and was a midshipman with HMS Leviathan in February 1917. He then served aboard HMS Roxburgh and HMS Minotaur in the Atlantic and North Sea. In 1919, Grant was promoted to sub-lieutenant and posted aboard HMS Warwick that saw service in the Baltic Sea. He returned to Canada in 1923. That year he was posted to HMCS Patriot based at Halifax and HMCS Patrician based at Vancouver, British Columbia, the following year. Beginning in 1927, Grant served in several Royal Navy warships including the battleships HMS Warspite and HMS Queen Elizabeth. He returned to Canada again in 1934.

Considered an above average officer by senior Canadian officers Leonard W. Murray and George C. Jones, Grant was earmarked for early promotion and reached the rank of commander in 1935. Grant chose navigation as his specialty and attended Royal Navy staff courses. Upon his return to Canada, he was appointed to HMCS Saguenay. In 1932, he married Christian Mitchell of Halifax, from an old Haligonian family and a secretary to the deputy minister of Defence. He served as Director of Canadian Naval Plans and Director of Naval Reserves. It was during this period that the Chief of the Naval Staff, Percy W. Nelles rebuked Grant, having thought his promotion had gone to his head and earned a reprimand for poor behaviour. In 1936, Grant was sent back overseas to join the staff of the Royal Navy Commander-in-Chief, Atlantic Fleet and take further staff courses. In 1938, he returned to Canada and was appointed commanding officer of the destroyer HMCS Skeena.

=== Second World War ===
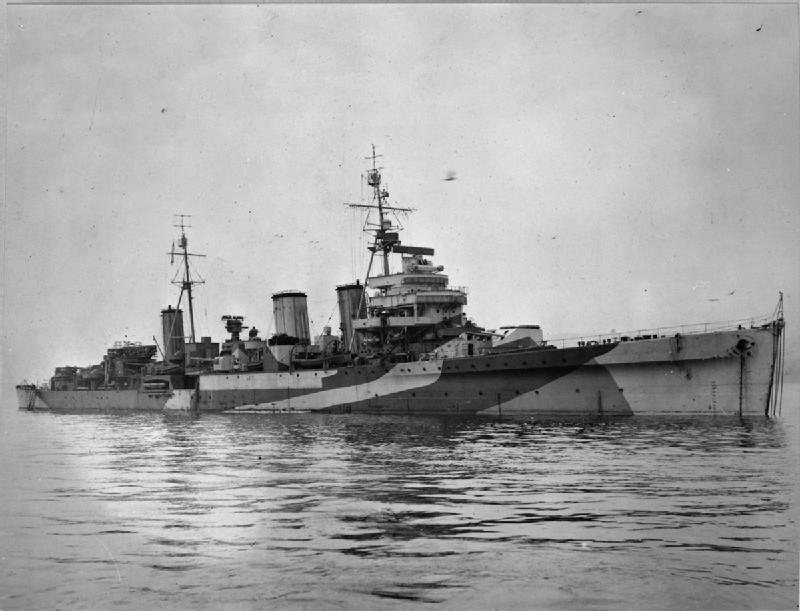
HMS Enterprise in November 1943 while Grant was in command.

At the outbreak of the Second World War, Grant was a member of the command staff of the Atlantic Coast. Promoted to captain in 1940, he became Director of Naval Personnel. It was during this period that Grant suggested that the expansion of the navy be halted to consolidate and train the existing personnel. He was overruled. Grant was then sent east where he appointed Captain (D) in St. John's in command of the destroyers assigned to the Newfoundland Escort Force. Six months later he was made commanding officer of the Royal Navy cruiser HMS Diomede in March 1943. This was done by Nelles to give Canadian officers experience with larger ships as the Royal Canadian Navy was intending to acquire cruisers and aircraft carriers as the war continued. Six months later, he shifted his command to the cruiser HMS Enterprise. He was awarded the Distinguished Service Order for "gallantry and skill and good service in command of HMS Enterprise in an action with enemy destroyers".

On 28 December 1943, in the Bay of Biscay, Enterprise and fellow light cruiser, HMS Glasgow took on 11 German destroyers. The two ships sank three German ships, damaged several others and chased the rest into a French port. He was Mentioned in Despatches for his service during the D-Day invasion of Normandy on 6 June 1944. During the invasion, Enterprise conducted shore bombardment in support of the invasion forces at Utah Beach. He was awarded the Bronze Star Medal by the United States for his actions during the naval bombardment of Cherbourg on 25 June 1944, during which he was wounded in an exchange with shore batteries. After leaving Enterprise, Grant returned to Royal Canadian Navy service and commissioned the cruiser HMCS Ontario and deployed to the Pacific. However, the surrender of Japan ended the war before Ontario could arrive and instead Grant and the cruiser helped re-establish British control over Hong Kong. Grant was appointed a Commander of the Order of the British Empire in January 1946.

=== Chief of the Naval Staff ===
Grant was promoted rear admiral in February 1946 and was appointed Chief of Administration Services and Supply in Ottawa, Ontario. He served as deputy to Chief of the Naval Staff Howard E. Reid, but for the most part, influenced the policy of the time more than Reid. Following the end of the war, the Royal Canadian Navy was greatly reduced in size, with fewer ships and those ships in service only partially crewed. Grant had a tendency to promote regular force officers over those of reserve backgrounds. He also maintained that senior officers did not require formal staff training. Grant was considered "blunt, arbitrary, a firm decision-maker and a sea-dog to the core."

By the time of Grant's promotion to vice admiral, appointment as the Chief of the Naval Staff and successor to Reid on 1 September 1947, the Minister of National Defence, Brooke Claxton sought to focus the navy's efforts on anti-submarine warfare (ASW) defence. Grant approved of Canada's new commitments to the North Atlantic Treaty Organization (NATO). However, he disapproved of Claxton's interference in naval affairs and some of these, including the re-arrangement of ranks within Canada's armed forces was one of the factors that led to a series of personnel unrest incidents in 1949. Following the unrest, a commission was set up by Claxton headed by Rear-Admiral Rollo Mainguy. Grant wanted the commission to be internal, but Claxton refused. Mainguy was Grant's man on the commission while Claxton chose Louis Audette, a former naval reservist who disliked Grant. The report latter found that several deficiencies in morale, training and leadership. It also affirmed that a Canadian identity for the navy should be expanded. Grant had already put in motion several initiatives to correct them, with the exception of the Canadian identity. Grant initially refused to support this recommendation and it was only with Claxton's pushing that Grant acted on it.

In 1950, the Korean War began and the Royal Canadian Navy was the only Canadian force able to send units immediately to the Korean Peninsula. At the same time, Grant was pushing for increased support for naval aviation and the new St. Laurent-class destroyers. The Korean War allowed Grant to seek funds for naval expansion and seven of the St. Laurents were authorised, along with increased personnel and active ships. The first of the St. Laurents, HMCS St. Laurent was launched on 30 November 1951. On 1 December, Grant retired. The launch of St. Laurent established Canada's naval identity for the remainder of the Cold War as an ASW-specialised force. Grant was succeeded as Chief of the Naval Staff by Vice-Admiral Rollo Mainguy. After retiring, he continued with naval life, serving as the president of the Royal Canadian Naval Benevolent Fund from 1956 to 1963. Grant died in Rockcliffe Park, Ottawa, Ontario on 8 May 1965. He was buried at Fairview Cemetery in Halifax. He was survived by his wife and three children.

== Sources ==
- German, Tony (1990). The Sea is at Our Gates: The History of the Canadian Navy. Toronto: McClelland & Stewart Incorporated. ISBN 0-7710-3269-2.
- Horn, Bernd & Harris, Stephen, eds. (2001). Warrior Chiefs: Perspectives on Senior Canadian Military Leaders. Toronto: Dundurn Press. ISBN 1-55002-351-9.
- Whitby, Michael; Gimblett, Richard H. & Haydon, Peter, eds. (2006). The Admirals: Canada's Senior Naval Leadership in the Twentieth Century. Toronto: Dundurn Press. ISBN 978-1-55002-580-4.
- Presiding By Desire: Nova Scotia's Popular Lieutenant Governor: Hon. MacCallum Grant. 2020. p. 1. ASIN 0228824990.

Military offices
Preceded by Howard Reid	Chief of the Naval Staff; 1947–1951	Succeeded by Rollo Mainguy
