= Howard Reid (admiral) =

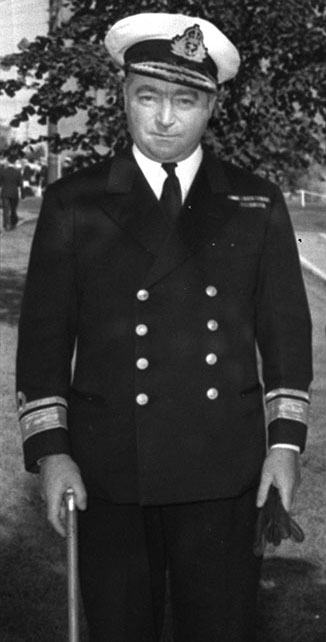
- Born: 5 June 1897; Portage-du-Fort, Quebec
- Died: 3 May 1962 (aged 64); Victoria, British Columbia
- Military career
- Allegiance: Canada
- Branch: Royal Canadian Navy
- Service years: 1912–1947
- Rank: Vice-Admiral
- Commands: Chief of the Naval Staff; Newfoundland Escort Force; Atlantic Coast; HMC Dockyard Halifax; HMCS Naden; HMCS Fraser; HMCS Skeena
- Conflicts: First World War; Second World War
- Awards: Companion of the Order of the Bath; Commander of the Legion of Merit (United States); Commander of the Legion of Honour (France)

Vice-Admiral Howard Emerson Reid, CB (5 June 1897 – 3 May 1962) was a Royal Canadian Navy officer who served as Chief of the Naval Staff from 28 February 1946 to 1 September 1947.

== Career ==
=== Early career ===
Born in Portage-du-Fort, Quebec, Reid was educated at Ashbury College before entering the Royal Naval College of Canada as a Cadet in 1912. He saw action in various British and Canadian ships during the First World War.

He commanded HMS Sepoy on the China Station in 1929. In 1931 he attended the staff course at the Royal Naval College, Greenwich. He became Commanding Officer of the destroyer HMCS Skeena in 1936, of the destroyer HMCS Fraser in 1937 and of the shore establishment HMCS Naden in 1938. He went on to be Commanding Officer of HMC Dockyard Halifax in 1938 and Commanding Officer Atlantic Coast in 1939.

=== World War II ===
He served in the Second World War as Deputy Chief of the Naval Staff from 1940, as Commodore commanding the Newfoundland Escort Force from 1942 and as Naval Member of the Canadian Joint Staff to Washington, D.C. in 1943.

=== Chief of the Naval Staff ===
Following the sudden death of Vice-Admiral George Jones, Reid became Chief of the Naval Staff in 1946. In November 1946, he criticised the government's naval policies, leading to a reprimand from Douglas Abbott, the Minister of National Defence for Naval Services. He stepped down as Chief of the Naval Staff in 1947 and retired the following year.

== Honours ==
Reid was appointed a Companion of the Order of the Bath (CB) in 1944. He was appointed a Commander of the Legion of Merit by the United States in 1946 and a Commander of the Legion of Honour by the French government in 1947.

Military offices
Preceded by George Jones	Chief of the Naval Staff; 1946–1947	Succeeded by Harold Grant
