= George Jones (Canadian admiral) =

Royal Canadian Navy admiral

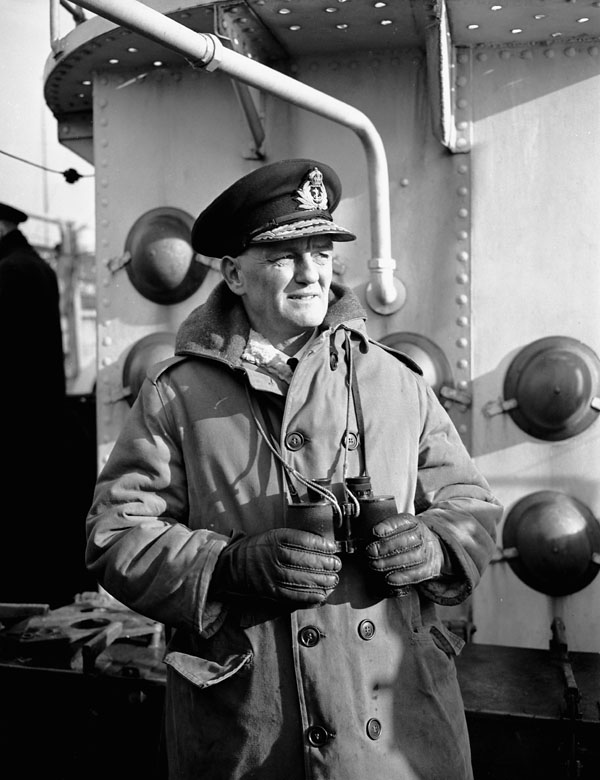
- Born: October 24, 1895; Halifax, Nova Scotia
- Died: February 8, 1946 (aged 50) Ottawa, Ontario
- Allegiance: Canada
- Branch: Royal Canadian Navy
- Service years: 1911–1946
- Rank: Vice-Admiral
- Commands: HMCS Patrician; HMCS Patriot; HMCS Skeena; Canadian Flotilla; Halifax Force; Atlantic Coast; Royal Canadian Navy
- Conflicts: First World War; Second World War
- Awards: Companion of the Order of the Bath

Vice-Admiral George Clarence Jones, CB (24 October 1895 – 8 February 1946) was a Royal Canadian Navy vice admiral who served as Chief of the Naval Staff from 15 January 1944 to 28 February 1946.

== Career ==
=== Early career ===
Jones joined the Royal Canadian Navy in 1911 at the age of 15, entering the Royal Naval College of Canada (RNCC) in January. Not a top student, Jones was first sent to the Royal Navy cruiser HMS Berwick for training in 1913, transferring to HMS Suffolk in 1914. During the First World War Jones joined HMS Cumberland in 1915 before performing his sub-lieutenant courses in 1916 at Portsmouth. In 1916, Jones served at the shore establishments HMS Victory II and HMS Excellent and HMS Pelican. On 1 December 1916, Jones was made sub-lieutenant in the Royal Canadian Navy. On 1 January 1917, Jones was made acting lieutenant. The position became permanent on 1 June that year. In 1917, Jones transferred to the depot ship HMS Hecla. Jones became the first lieutenant of the destroyer HMS Vanquisher in 1917, serving with the ship until 1918. That year, Jones joined HMS Wallington and HMS Leander for periods of time.

=== Interwar years ===
Following the war, Lieutenant Jones returned to the RNCC from 1919 to 1920. In 1920, Jones was appointed to command the Canadian destroyer HMCS Patrician, the first member of the original RNCC class to achieve the position. It was during this period that the rivalry with Leonard W. Murray and R.I. Agnew began. Murray and Agnew used naval regulations to gain seniority on the Navy List, putting them closer to receiving commands than Jones. Agnew jumped over Jones in seniority. Walter Hose, the director of the Royal Canadian Navy at the time, sought to ease tensions among the three by giving Jones command of Patrician. However, he made Agnew Patrician's first lieutenant in August 1921 and the results were poor. In 1922, Jones was made commanding officer of the destroyer HMCS Patriot. In 1923, Jones joined HMS Vivid III and transferred to HMS President to undergo the Royal Naval War Staff course. In 1924, Jones joined the battleship HMS Resolution and wrote a letter in August to Hose requesting increased seniority on the Navy List due to the fact that he was unable to specialize and climb the ranks. Not long after Jones was promoted to lieutenant commander effective 1 January 1925, while Agnew remained a lieutenant for a further two-and-a-half months. Murray remained senior to Jones. Jones was then assigned to HMCS Stadacona, followed up by a stint at Naval Service Headquarters in 1925.

In 1927, Jones was assigned to the battleship HMS Iron Duke, followed by a stint aboard HMS Benbow in 1928. Jones was promoted to commander effective 1 January 1929 was made Senior Naval Officer Halifax at HMCS Stadacona in 1929. Jones remained in that position until 1932, when he became the commanding officer of the destroyer HMCS Skeena. In 1934, Walter Hose retired and Percy W. Nelles was made the commander of the Royal Canadian Navy. Under Hose, Murray had prospered and was made acting captain. Nelles preferred Jones as an officer, and his professional reviews of Jones were better than those he gave Murray. That year, Jones became Senior Naval Officer Esquimalt based at HMCS Naden. This was followed by a term as Director of Naval Operations and Training in 1936. On 1 August 1938, Jones was promoted to captain, while Murray was promoted a day later, making Jones senior to Murray. Jones was then assigned to HMCS Ottawa and brought the destroyer from the West Coast to the East Coast and was named Captain (D) Canadian Flotilla in 1938.

=== Second World War ===
As Captain (D) of the Canadian Flotilla, Jones had control over the East Coast destroyer force during the opening months of the Second World War, commanding the destroyer HMCS Assiniboine. On 7 June 1940, he was made a commodore and made the commanding officer of Halifax Force from 1940. Jones transferred his flag ashore to HMCS Stadacona and was made Commanding Officer Atlantic Coast. This was the senior Canadian position on the East Coast. It was during this period that he earned the nickname "Jetty Jones", which came about during his stints in command of Ottawa and Assiniboine. The nickname was based on the idea that Jones' vessels remained in harbour more than other ships in the fleet. This was not the reality as Jones took his fair share of sailings, but did represent his growing unpopularity among the personnel of the Royal Canadian Navy. On 1 December 1941, Jones was made a rear admiral and continued to hold the Atlantic Coast command. Murray's appointment to rear admiral came a day later, maintaining Jones' seniority over Murray. In March 1942, Jones had a heart attack, making the only witness to the even swear secrecy so that Jones could continue his naval career.

Nelles liked Jones' ability to do staff work and got the permission from the Defence Minister, Angus L. MacDonald to bring him to Ottawa. Jones joined HMCS Bytown in Ottawa at the Naval Service Headquarters as Vice Chief of the Naval Staff beginning on 9 October 1942 and as a member of the Naval Board. A hard worker, Jones began a campaign to undermine Nelles and eventually take over command of the Royal Canadian Navy. Jones was caught by Nelles discussing naval training issues with the defence minister behind his back. Jones formed a small group of officers at headquarters that called themselves "Jones men". One of them, Horatio Nelson Lay was the nephew of the Prime Minister, William Lyon Mackenzie King, and set about undermining the prime minister's confidence in Nelles. Facing both internal dissent and external pressure, MacDonald reassigned Nelles to oversee the Canadian naval component of the upcoming invasion of Europe. In 1943 and became Chief of the Naval Staff. Jones was caught off guard by the announcement of his promotion. He was appointed a Companion of the Order of the Bath in May 1943.

Upon assuming office, Jones drew up plans to dismiss and forcibly retire scores of former Royal Navy and Royal Canadian Naval Reserve officers in a purge. The dismissal of former Royal Navy officers was an effort by Jones to allow Canadian officers to prove themselves and to make the service more Canadian. It was also during his tenure that the issues that had plagued Nelles, such as fleet modernisation and training, were mostly resolved. On 9 May 1944, he was promoted to vice admiral. Jones then sought to transfer 70% of the Royal Canadian Navy fleet to the Pacific in tandem with the Royal Navy. Working with MacDonald and Lay, Jones received approval from the Cabinet. However, the British assumed Canada would send its fleet to help the Royal Navy recover lost colonies in the South Pacific, to which King wanted no part of. As King grew angry at the efforts by MacDonald and Jones' to keep their word to the British that Canada would join them in the South Pacific, the two shifted blame onto Nelles as the scapegoat. When Nelles came home to give an update, he learned he was to be forcibly retired in January 1945. Jones and MacDonald travelled to England and managed to get the aircraft carriers and destroyers that had been promised in trade for Canadian support in the South Pacific without going against King's wishes.

Jones' advocated further ties with the United States Navy, believing that the future lied in hemispheric defence. In April 1945, MacDonald left the National Defence post and was replaced by a new minister, Douglas Abbott. Shortly after assuming the post, the Halifax riot took place, when citizens and sailors rioted after drinking establishments were closed in Halifax for the VE-Day celebration. This led to the dismissal of Rear Admiral Murray, who was Commander-in-Chief Northwest Atlantic, whom Jones blamed for the situation. Jones assumed the title Commander-in-Chief Northwest Atlantic in his place. Jones initially left Harry DeWolf in charge in Ottawa as acting Chief of Naval Staff and focused his attention on the Northwest Atlantic. This led to instability in Ottawa, as DeWolf did not have enough authority and eventually Rear Admiral Cuthbert Taylor was put in place in Ottawa while Jones continued to focus on the Northwest Atlantic. Following the war's end, demobilisation efforts were restricted by the lack of direction from Ottawa, an issue that was not resolved until Jones' successor took over.

Jones died in office in 1946. The cause of death was ruled to be a cerebral hemorrhage caused by hypertension.

== Awards and decorations ==
Jones's personal awards and decorations include the following:

Ribbon	Description	Notes
	Order of the Bath (CB)	Decoration awarded 5 June 1943 as per Canada Gazette and 2 June 1943 in the London Gazette; Companion level
	1914-15 Star	WWI 1914-1918
	British War Medal	WWI 1914-1918
	Victory Medal (United Kingdom)	WWI 1914-1918
	1939–1945 Star	WWII 1939-1945
	Atlantic Star	WWII 1939-1945
	Canadian Volunteer Service Medal	with Overseas Service bar
	War Medal 1939–1945	WWII 1939-1945
	King George V Silver Jubilee Medal	Decoration awarded on 6 May 1935
	King George VI Coronation Medal	Decoration awarded on 12 May 1937
	Commander of the Legion of Merit	Decoration awarded 3 August 1946 As per the Canada Gazette and on the 10 July 1946 in the London Gazette; Commander level; United States award
	Legion of Honour	Decoration awarded 1 November 1946; Commander level; France award
	Croix de Guerre 1939–1945 with palm	Decoration awarded on 1 December 1948; France award
	Order of St. Olav	Decoration awarded on 1 December 1948; (Norway) Norwegian award

== Citations ==
Military offices
Preceded by Percy Nelles	Chief of the Naval Staff; 1944–1946	Succeeded by Howard Reid
