= Halifax riot =

1945 rioting and looting by civilians and servicemen in Halifax, Nova Scotia, Canada

The Halifax VE-Day riots, 7–8 May 1945, in Halifax and Dartmouth, Nova Scotia, began as a celebration of the World War II victory in Europe. This rapidly evolved into a rampage by several thousand servicemen, merchant seamen, and civilians, who looted the City of Halifax. Although a subsequent Royal Commission chaired by Justice Roy Kellock blamed lax naval authority and specifically Rear-Admiral Leonard W. Murray, it is generally accepted that the underlying causes were a combination of bureaucratic confusion, insufficient policing, and antipathy between the military and civilians, fueled by the presence of 25,000 servicemen who had strained Halifax wartime resources to the limit.

== Halifax at the end of World War II ==
Tensions had been building for six years as war (Canada joined the war on September 10,1939 as it was a British dominion) transformed Halifax from a small and conservative maritime city into what a British admiral called the "most important port in the world," the Canadian Headquarters of the Battle of the Atlantic and the western terminus for the vital North Atlantic convoys to England. By 1945, Halifax had become a bustling, overcrowded, underserviced port city.

During the war, Halifax's population doubled; its facilities did not. There were huge lineups to get into the city's few restaurants, several-hour waits outside movie theatres. There was no legal place anyone could go to buy a drink, but there were dozens of illegal ones. For their part, locals claimed there was never anything for them to buy on store shelves anymore because ungrateful come-from-aways had bought it all, or the military had commandeered it to supply a departing convoy. Though there were honourable landlords, friendly merchants and plenty of locals eager to make the visitors welcome, there were also rumblings from early on in the war that Halifax ("Slackers", as the sailors called it) would get "what was coming" when the war finally ended. Fear, in fact, dominated planning for the celebration of the Allied victory. Organizers decided that on VE Day tram service would stop for the day, to discourage sailors from going downtown. Liquor commission outlets, restaurants, retailers and movie theatres all decided to shut and shutter their premises, ostensibly to prevent trouble.

== The "Open Gangway" decision ==
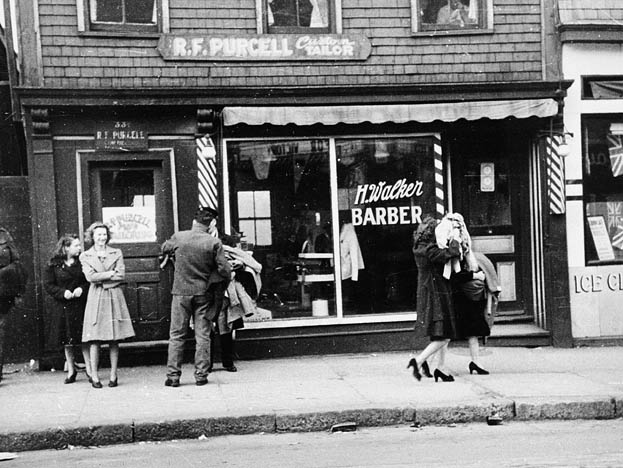
East side of Göttingen Street between Falkland and Cornwallis Streets after the riots

Rear Admiral Leonard W. Murray believed his sailors had won the peace and deserved their chance to celebrate. Late on the afternoon of 7 May 1945, the day Germany surrendered, he overruled the advice of his senior officers and allowed more than 9,000 of his men to go ashore for the night, with the mild admonition that their celebration "be joyful without being destructive or distasteful." By midnight, downtown Halifax was filled to bursting with more than 12,000 celebrants who had no place to eat or relax. Without licensed bars to go to, they rioted instead, setting ablaze tramcars and a police paddy wagon, smashing windows, looting liquor stores and denuding shops of merchandise. On Barrington Street, there was so much broken glass in the street it spilled over the top of the curb. One reporter who wandered through the downtown devastation the next morning compared it to "London after a blitz."

The riots might have ended that morning, as hungover sailors and civilians, many clutching their ill-gotten booty, stumbled home to sleep off their night before. But Murray was not informed of the events of the night before until he opened his morning papers at 9:45 AM on 8 May. Assuming that the newspapers were again trying to blame his sailors for the sins of civilians and convinced that "probably not more 200" of his men actually participated in the riots and these at the instigation of civilian bootleggers, Murray took no steps to rescind the standing order that allowed another 9,500 sailors to go ashore to join the official VE Day festivities on 8 May. By the time the mayhem ended later that day – after the Admiral and Mayor Butler drove through town in a sound truck ordering everyone to return to their homes and barracks, and imposing a curfew on the city – there were three men dead (two from alcohol poisoning, and one a possible murder), 363 arrested, 654 businesses damaged and 207 establishments looted to some degree. Seventy-four thousand litres (65,000 imperial quarts) of liquor, 8,000 cases of beer and 1,500 cases of wine had been "liberated" from liquor commission shelves. The total price tag: more than $5 million (over $87 million in 2024), including the cost of replacing 2,624 sheets of plate glass.

== The aftermath ==
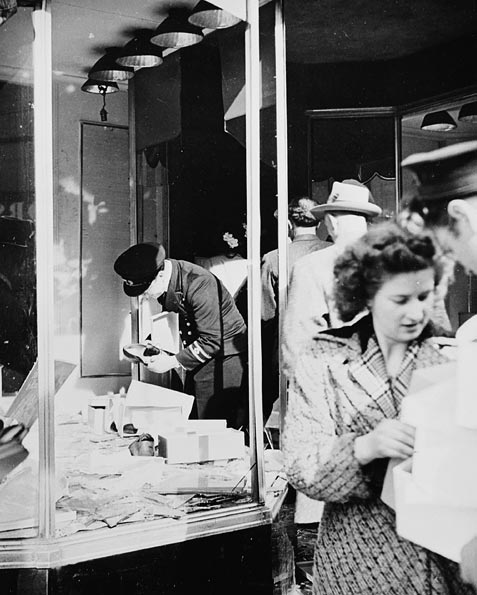
Looted shoe store after the riots.

A hastily convened Royal Commission chaired by Justice Roy Kellock blamed the riots on the failure of Naval command to control the sailors, and particularly on the Admiral:

The disorders which actually occurred on May 7 and 8 owe their origin, in my opinion, to failure on the part of the Naval Command in Halifax to plan for their personnel ... Once started, the development and continuance of the disorders were due to the failure of the Naval Command to put down the initial disorders on each of the two days, May 7 and 8. Subsequently the insufficiency of the police forces, service and civilian, employed, as well as their faulty direction on both days, and the passive conduct of the Naval Command in allowing naval personnel to continue unchecked on the afternoon of May 8 without taking any steps to deal with the situation until a very late hour, when the disorders had begun to play themselves out, explain the length of time during which the disorders continued.

A naval Board of Inquiry chaired by Rear Admiral V G Brodeur found that "the disorders of 7th and 8th May cannot be attributed to any one cause but rather to a series of events which led a normal body of men, prepared to celebrate in an innocuous manner, to disorders of a serious nature", although the Board also felt that leadership failed when "no steps were taken by the Commander in Chief, Canadian Northwest Atlantic, and the Commanding Officers, to admonish naval personnel regarding the breaches of order and discipline" following the first day of disturbances. The following year, Murray resigned in protest of the Board of Inquiry's findings.

== See also ==
- List of incidents of civil unrest in Canada
