= Leonard W. Murray =

Canadian admiral in WW II (1896–1971)

Leonard Warren Murray
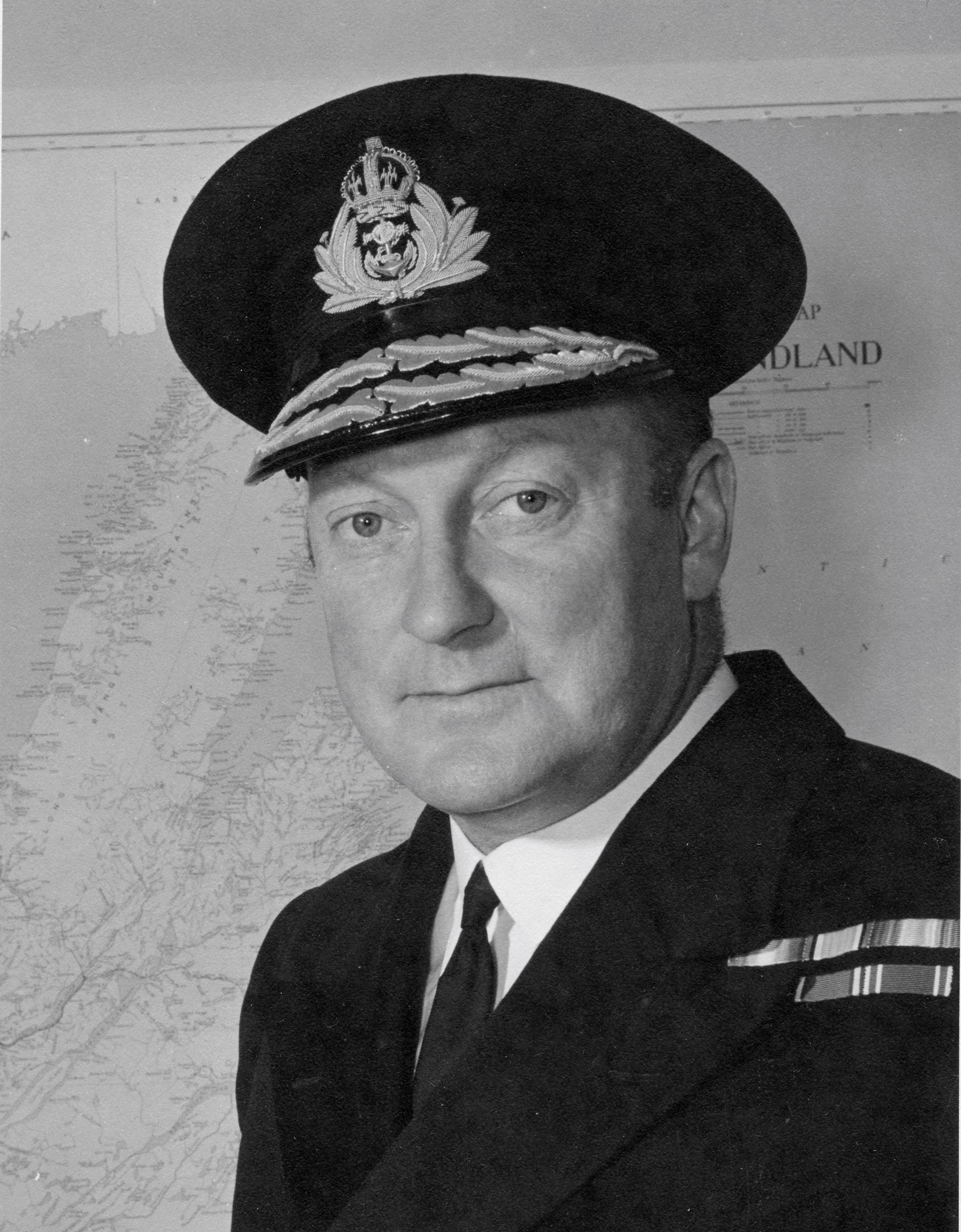
- Rear Admiral Leonard Warren Murray, RCN, Commander-in-Chief of the Canadian North West Atlantic c. May 1943.
- Born: 22 June 1896; Granton, Nova Scotia, Canada
- Died: 25 November 1971 (aged 75); Buxton, Derbyshire, England
- Military career
- Allegiance: Canada
- Branch: Royal Canadian Navy
- Service years: 1911–1946
- Rank: Rear Admiral
- Commands: HMCS Saguenay; HMCS Assiniboine; Newfoundland Escort Force; Mid-Ocean Escort Force; Commander-in-Chief Canadian Northwest Atlantic
- Conflicts: World War I: U-boat Campaign; World War II: Battle of the Atlantic; Battle of the St. Lawrence
- Awards: Companion of the Order of the Bath; Commander of the Order of the British Empire; Croix de guerre (France); Legion d'Honneur (France); Legion of Merit (United States); Haakon VII's Freedom Cross (Norway)

Rear Admiral Leonard Warren Murray, CB, CBE (22 June 1896 – 25 November 1971) was an officer in the Royal Canadian Navy who played a central role in the Battle of the Atlantic, and was the only Canadian to command an Allied theatre of operations during World War II.

Murray was in the inaugural cohort at the Royal Naval College of Canada, and entered naval service in 1913 on the British armoured cruiser HMS Berwick. He served as a junior officer throughout World War I on Canadian and British ships, and witnessed the surrender of the German fleet at Scapa Flow. Between the wars, at a time when the Canadian navy had few ships of its own, Murray moved steadily up the ranks serving on British ships and studying at the Royal Naval Staff College in the United Kingdom. He commanded the Canadian destroyer HMCS Saguenay, as well as naval bases on Canada's east and west coasts.

Commencing his World War II service as Deputy Chief of Naval Staff, Murray played a key role in negotiations with the United States and the UK on rapidly expanding the Canadian Navy. He was a founding member of the Permanent Joint Board on Defence and helped negotiate the destroyers-for-bases deal. In late 1940, Murray was placed in command of a fleet of five Canadian ships dispatched to defend the UK. From there, he was reassigned to command positions on Canada's east coast, initially in command of the Newfoundland Escort Force, then Commanding Officer Atlantic Coast. Following the Atlantic Convoy Conference of March 1943, Murray was appointed Commander-in-Chief, Canadian Northwest Atlantic, and successfully led Canadian, British, American and other Allied naval and air forces to victory in the Battle of the Atlantic.

Murray was controversially blamed for allowing sailors to take shore leave in Halifax, Nova Scotia, on VE Day, a decision that is believed to have contributed to the Halifax Riot of 7–8 May 1945. Following the riot, Murray retired from the Royal Canadian Navy and moved to the UK, where he practiced law and became active in local politics.

== Early years ==
Leonard Warren Murray was born at Granton, Nova Scotia on 22 June 1896. His father, Simon Dickson Murray (1859–1936), was a mid-level manager in various enterprises, and managed the Acadia Coal Company's pier in Pictou Landing from 1903 to the early 1920s. His mother was Jane Falconer (1868–1968)—a direct descendant of the Scottish immigrants who travelled to Pictou County aboard Hector in 1773. At 14 years of age, Murray left Pictou Academy to join the first intake of 21 recruits into the Royal Naval College of Canada in Halifax, which had just been created by the Naval Service Act of 4 May 1910. Life for the recruits was difficult. In his own words:

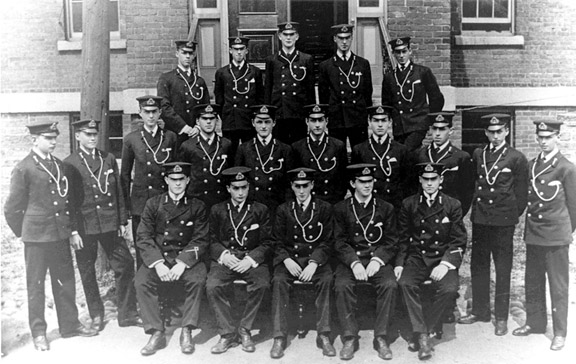
Midshipmen at the Royal Naval College, Murray second from left

"The first winter at the naval college was absolute hell, we had no uniforms, we arrived in what we stood up in and had to send home for further clothing. A case of measles broke out very shortly and we were quarantined, and the only time we got out of the college was when we went to the skating rink to play hockey; and that was a great relief." – Admiral Murray.

Immediately after graduating in January 1913, Murray went to sea as a midshipman on the Royal Navy armoured cruiser HMS Berwick, protecting British interests in the Mexican Revolution, and then in the armoured cruiser HMS Essex. This was a tense moment for Canada's fledgling navy: the Government of Robert Borden favoured a policy of providing ships and sailors to the British navy, but was blocked by the opposition led by Sir Wilfrid Laurier, who advocated for Canada to have its own navy.

== World War I ==
On 14 August 1914, immediately following the outbreak of World War I, Murray was assigned to the protected cruiser HMCS Niobe, the largest ship in the Royal Canadian Navy at that time. Niobe mostly patrolled the coastal waters from New York to Newfoundland, and prevented 38 German merchant ships from leaving the neutral port of New York. Four of Murray's Naval College classmates were sent to the Royal Navy armoured cruiser HMS Good Hope, and were killed off the coast of South America on 1 November 1914 at the Battle of Coronel—becoming the first Canadian-service casualties of World War I.

After Niobe was decommissioned in July 1915, Murray was promoted to acting sub-lieutenant on 1 December 1915, and served briefly as Flotilla Gunnery Officer in the patrol ship HMCS Margaret, before being transferred as sub-lieutenant to the protected cruiser HMCS Rainbow on Canada's West Coast. This provided Murray with valuable experience on Canada's Atlantic and Pacific coasts, and on three of Canada's six ships in the early years of World War I. He spent the last two years of World War I as Assistant Navigating Officer in the armoured cruiser HMS Leviathan, from January 1917 as lieutenant, where he helped plan troop convoys across the Atlantic that avoided the threat from German U-boats. This proved to be invaluable experience for the Battle of the Atlantic more than 20 years later. Murray ended World War I in the North Sea aboard the battleship HMS Agincourt, and witnessed the surrender of the German fleet at Scapa Flow.

== Between the wars ==
After World War I, Murray served briefly in flotilla leader HMS Ithuriel, and then in the newly commissioned light cruiser HMS Calcutta under the distinguished British Captain Percy Noble, from whom Murray learned the basic skills of command, and who eighteen years later served opposite Murray on the receiving end of the convoys as Commander-in-Chief, Western Approaches Command. Following a short tour aboard the cruiser HMS Crescent, Murray was assigned to the light cruiser HMS Aurora as Navigation Officer, until Aurora was decommissioned in July 1922 due to naval budget cuts. With the downsizing of the Royal Canadian Navy, and given his recent marriage to Jean Chaplin Scott in Westmount, Quebec on 10 October 1921, Murray considered a civilian career—and in 1924 qualified as master of a foreign-going vessel. In the end, however, Murray decided to remain with the armed forces, and he joined many of his colleagues alternating between shore assignments as a training officer with the Royal Canadian Naval Volunteer Reserve, and serving aboard Royal Navy vessels.

Thus it was that, as a Canadian, Murray served on the dreadnought battleship HMS Revenge (during a tour in 1923 in Turkey he befriended Lord Louis Mountbatten), and the battleship HMS Queen Elizabeth, where he served as Assistant to the Master of the Fleet. Understandably, this provided Murray and his peers, including Percy W. Nelles, with a distinct anglophile and Royal Navy bias. In January 1925, Murray was promoted to lieutenant-commander and spent two years at the Royal Canadian Navy's main training base at HMCS Stadacona in Halifax. He returned to the UK in 1927, for a tour aboard the battlecruiser HMS Tiger, and then he spent 1928 studying at the Royal Naval Staff College at Greenwich. During a simulation exercise at the college, Murray broke new ground by planning large convoys—convoys that were regarded by his peers at the time as "almost suicidal". Upon return to Canada in January 1929, Murray was promoted to commander and became the senior naval officer at CFB Esquimalt on Vancouver Island, British Columbia. In notes for a 1932 lecture to Royal Military College at Kingston, Ontario, his continuing interest in the offensive merit of convoys over patrols is evident:

"The institution of a system of convoy requires a reorientation of the protective forces. Instead of patrolling the focal areas [where vessels congregate near ports or narrow passages], the group of ships forming the convoy is escorted by an armed escort capable of dealing with any possible scale of attack. This may mean that an increase in the protective force is necessary, but ... the protective force is more definite and concrete than in the patrolling method. In the convoy method ... it is not possible for an enemy to attack without laying herself open to attack and possible destruction"—Admiral Murray.

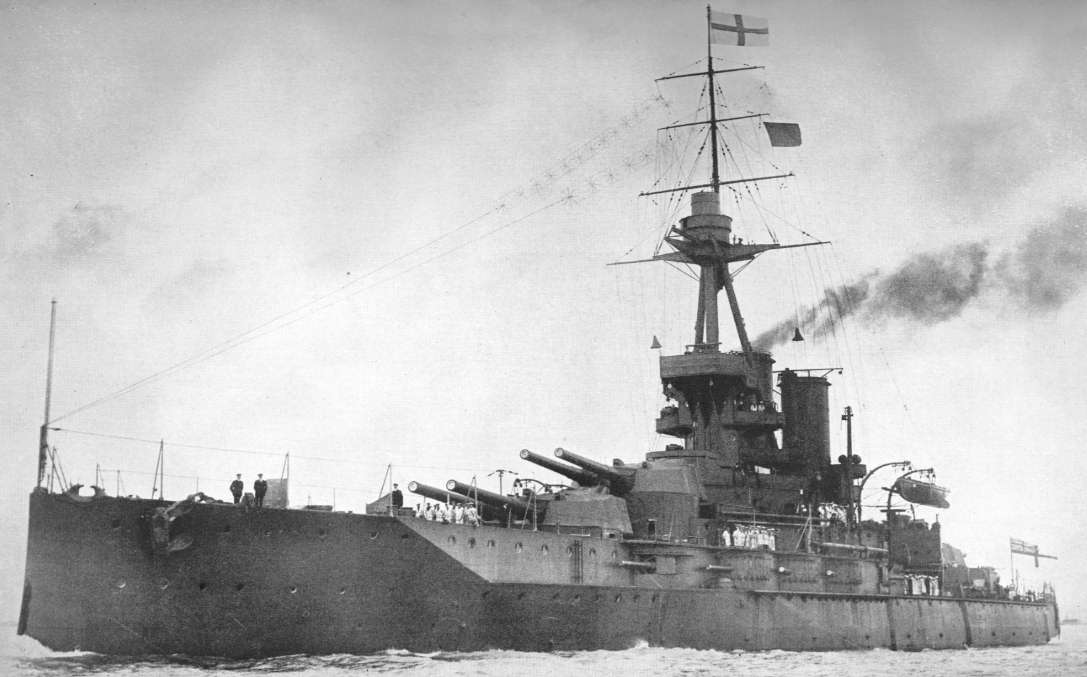
As Executive Officer, with the rank of Commander, the former battleship Iron Duke was the largest vessel on which Murray served during his career.

In June 1932, Murray was assigned for a year to Naval Service Headquarters in Ottawa as a Naval Staff Officer before setting back to sea for two years, leading the small fleet of East Coast destroyers from the bridge of his first operational command, the new destroyer HMCS Saguenay. At this point, in mid-1934, Murray was appointed to a new position of Senior Naval Officer, Halifax, a position that combined the Commander of the East Coast with the Command of the Naval Dockyard in Halifax. In June 1936 Murray was sent back to the UK to work in the Admiralty Operations Division, and in December 1936 he started his final tour with the Royal Navy serving as executive officer aboard the former battleship HMS Iron Duke, where he participated in the 1937 Coronation Fleet Review. Murray was admitted to the Imperial Defence College in 1938, during which time he was promoted to captain. Upon graduation, and on the eve of World War II, Murray returned to Ottawa as a captain, and Director of Naval Operations and Training.

== World War II and the Battle of the Atlantic ==
=== 1939–1942 ===
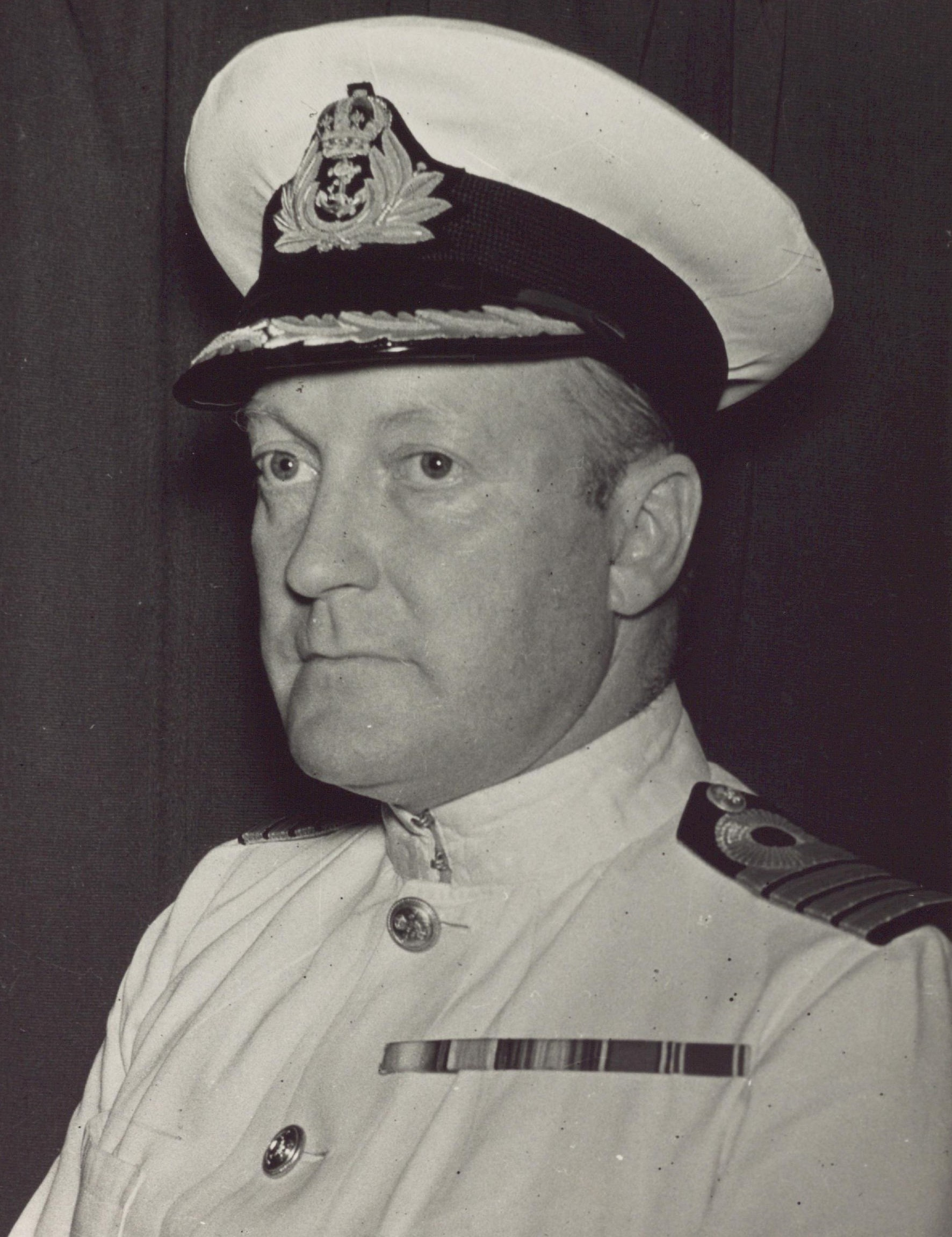
Commodore Leonard W Murray. Photo taken c. 1941

At the outbreak of World War II, Murray was appointed Deputy Chief of the Naval Staff. From this HQ position, he played a key role in the build-up of the Navy from a starting point of six destroyers, to its eventual wartime strength of approximately 332 vessels. This effort included crossing Canada to recruit retired Royal Navy officers back into the Royal Canadian Navy, and advocating for the "small-ship anti-submarine" investment strategy that was eventually so successful.

Murray was also central to negotiations with the US and the UK. In March 1940 he made a secret visit to the UK to negotiate the construction of destroyers in the UK for the Royal Canadian Navy, and after returning to Canada he attended the first US-Canada Chiefs of Staff meetings leading up to the Ogdensburg Agreement. From there, Murray became a founding member of the Permanent Joint Board on Defence (PJBD). It was while he was working for the PJBD that he renewed his friendship with Commander James "Chummy" Prentice, who was shortly thereafter assigned the position of Senior Officer, Canadian Corvettes under Murray. Both men would work closely together until the spring of 1944.

Immediately after Ogdensburg, Murray traveled back to the UK, where he worked with the Canadian High Commissioner Vincent Massey to negotiate the Destroyers-for-bases deal, under which 50 US destroyers were provided to the British (and eventually Canadian) navies, in exchange for American land rights to a number of UK naval bases in the Caribbean. In parallel, a 99 year lease agreement was signed, not contingent upon the supply of destroyers, providing the US with rights to establish naval bases in Bermuda and Newfoundland, which was at that time a British dominion. Murray signed the agreement for Canada, along with Vincent Massey and Deputy High Commissioner Lester B. Pearson, on 2 September 1940, before returning to Canada and being appointed commodore.

In October 1940, Murray went back to sea briefly as Captain of HMCS Assiniboine and Commodore Commanding Halifax Force, effectively in command of the five Canadian warships that were dispatched to the UK in January 1941 to serve on convoy duty in UK coastal waters. While ashore for four months in the UK, Murray was given the unusual title of Commodore Commanding Canadian Ships and Establishments in the United Kingdom, and liaised closely with the Admiralty in the planning of an Atlantic strategy.

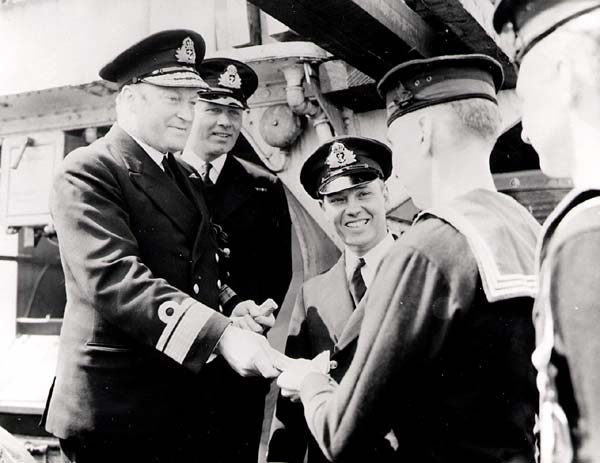
Rear Admiral Murray presenting awards to crew members of HMCS St. Croix, which sank the German submarine U-90 on 24 July 1942

On his return to Canada, and at the request of British Admiral Sir Dudley Pound, on 13 June 1941 Murray was put in charge of the Newfoundland Escort Force based out of St John's. This was the most important operational mandate given to a Royal Canadian Navy officer until that point, in full command of 6 Canadian destroyers, 7 British destroyers, and 21 corvettes, and with responsibility for convoy escort from New York out as far as the transfer point to UK escorts south of Iceland.

"Conditions were terrible that winter. Groups worked on a 35-day cycle which entailed 29 days away from St John's, 27 days away from fresh bread, 25 days away from fresh meat, added to which at the northern end of their beat there was no sunlight to speak of in the winter. We had to revert to the old rations of Nelson's time, barreled salt beef with lime juice or tomato juice to scare away scurvy"—Admiral Murray

In August 1941, the US assumed command in the Western Atlantic, and the American Rear Admiral Arthur L. Bristol was appointed over Murray, who remained second in command until September 1942. In recognition of this increased role, and in order to retain an appropriate rank in relation to Bristol, Murray was appointed rear admiral on 2 December 1941.

=== Saint Pierre and Miquelon incident ===
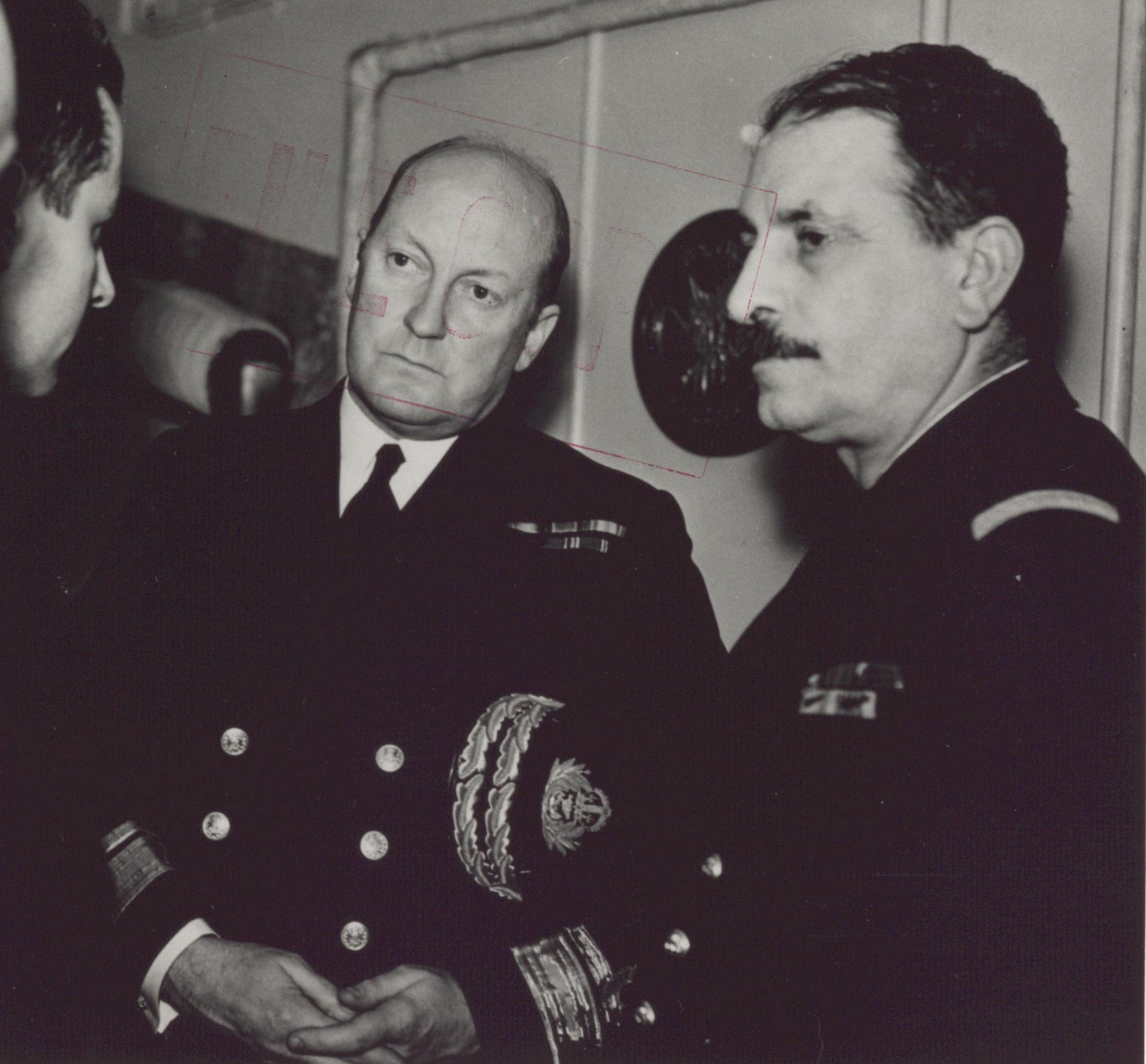
Admirals Murray (Canada) and Muselier (France) c. 1942

While based in Newfoundland, Admiral Murray hosted a visit from the Free French Vice Admiral Émile Muselier. Acting on orders from the British Admiralty, Murray gave Muselier temporary command of three French corvettes and a submarine that were assigned to Murray's fleet, for passage from the UK to Halifax. On return from Halifax, Muselier took the vessels to Vichy-controlled Saint Pierre and Miquelon, and on 24 December 1941 raised the Free French flag on the islands. This was interpreted as a territorial claim on behalf of General Charles de Gaulle, thereby creating a diplomatic incident between France, Canada and the United States. De Gaulle's seizure of the archipelago was over the opposition of Canada, United Kingdom, and United States, which were concerned about pushing the Vichy government into an openly pro-German stance.

Murray was later asked to account for his role in this adventure—and he steadfastly claimed (as confirmed by Muselier) that he had no part in it. Nevertheless, in 1946 Murray was awarded the Legion d'Honneur by the Government of France, for "eminent services rendered to the cause of Free France at the time of the rallying of the inhabitants of St Pierre and Miquelon".

=== 1942–1945 ===
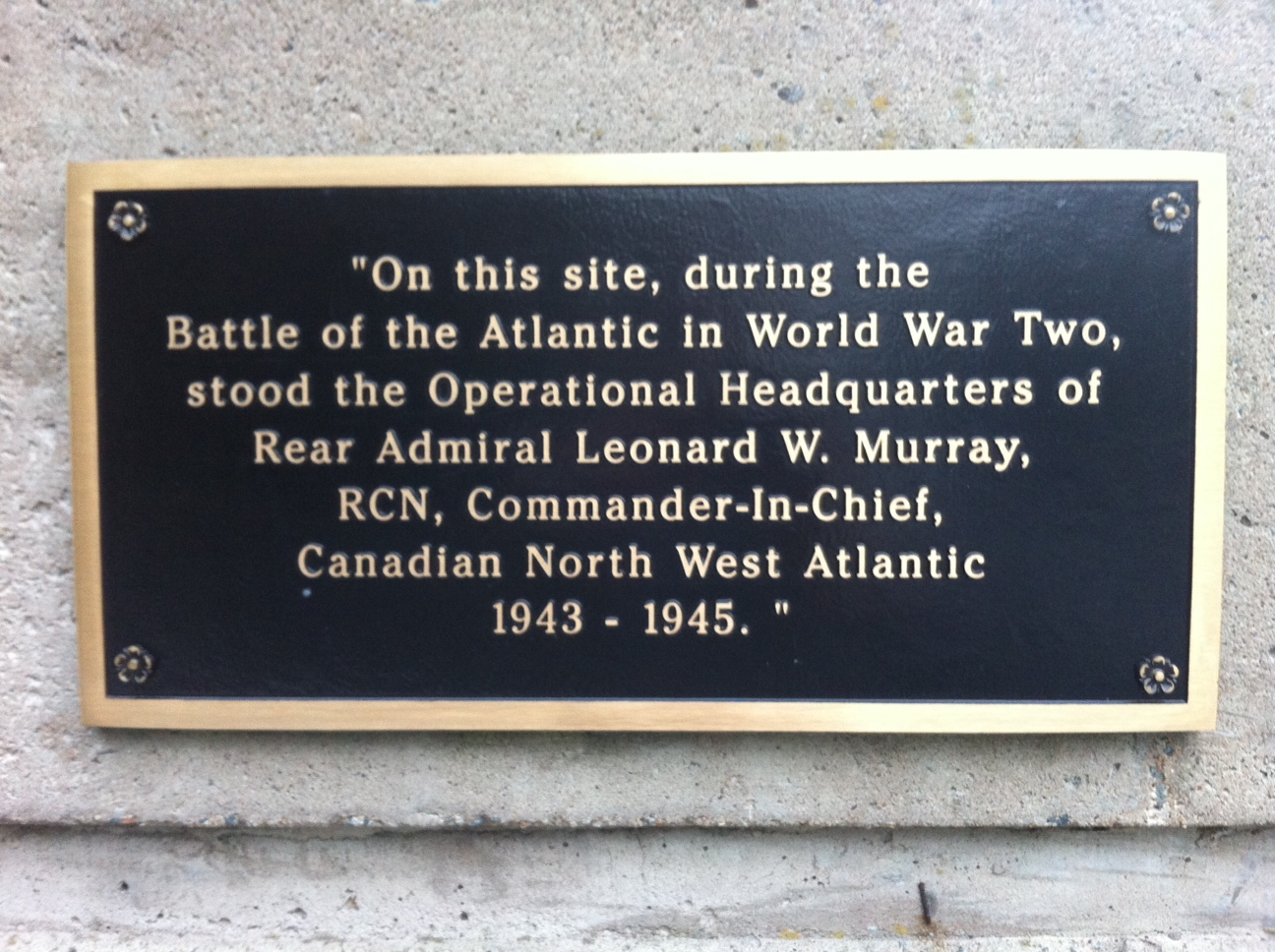
Plaque at the location of Admiral Murray's Operational HQs in Halifax

The Newfoundland Escort Force was reorganized in February 1942 as the Mid-Ocean Escort Force. On 9 September 1942, Murray was appointed to Commanding Officer Atlantic Coast, with his Headquarters in Halifax, and given effective command over 322 armed ships. As a direct result of the Atlantic Convoy Conference of 1–12 March 1943, where it was agreed that the United States Navy would concentrate on the South Atlantic leaving Canada and the UK to cover the North Atlantic, on 1 April 1943 Murray was made Commander-in-Chief Canadian Northwest Atlantic, thereby becoming the only Canadian to command an Allied theatre of operations during World War II. Still headquartered in Halifax, Murray commanded all Allied air and naval forces involved in convoy protection between Canada and a point south of Greenland, until the end of the war in Europe in 1945.

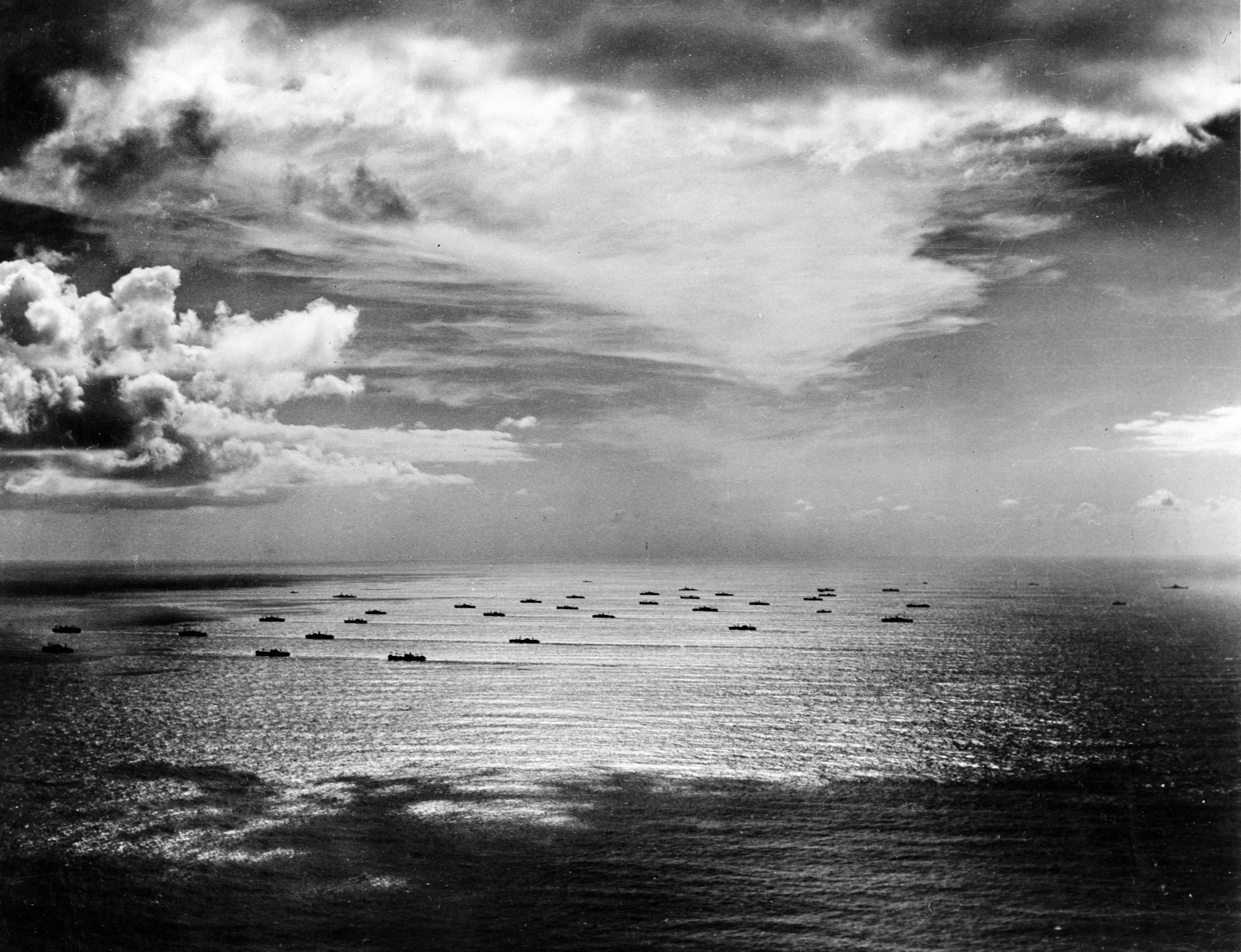
Atlantic convoy in 1942

"In order to encourage the captains of the merchant ships of all countries which carry the lifeblood of the U.K., I made it a point to attend the briefing conference of all captains and chief engineers before their departure. During the winter of '42–'43, when sinkings were at their worst, I could see when I told them of the measures by escort and air cover that were being taken for their protection and safety; I could see that they knew very well and that they knew I knew in spite of my brave words, that anything up to 25 percent of them would probably not arrive in the U.K. in their own ships, and that probably half of that number would not arrive in the U.K. at all. But there was never a waver in their resolve"—Admiral Murray.

A personal highlight of this period occurred on 14 September 1943, when Murray gave an impromptu guided tour of Halifax to the British Prime Minister Winston Churchill. Churchill and his family, together with the First Sea Lord Dudley Pound, boarded HMS Renown in Halifax Harbour for their return voyage to the United Kingdom following consultations with US President Franklin D. Roosevelt. Murray was appointed Commander of the Order of the British Empire in the 1943 King's Birthday Honours, and Companion of the Order of the Bath in 1944.

As the Allies gained the upper hand in the Battle of the Atlantic throughout 1943 and 1944, attacks on convoys diminished and the amount of escort cover was reduced, but the hard work of planning and organizing convoys never ceased. By May 1944, British participation in convoy escorts was withdrawn entirely, and Canada was left with sole responsibility until September 1944. Murray's moment of singular pride came in this period, when the largest convoy of World War II, HX 300 sailed for the UK via New York on 17 July 1944, with 167 merchant ships in 19 columns. This huge convoy arrived in the UK, without incident, on 3 August 1944.

=== VE Day and early retirement ===
Admiral Murray was controversially blamed for allowing sailors shore leave in Halifax on VE Day, a decision that is generally considered to have contributed to the Halifax Riot of 7–8 May 1945. James Lorimer Ilsley, the Acting Prime Minister of Canada, responded quickly to the situation and on 10 May appointed Justice Kellock to chair a Royal Commission into the disorders. On 12 May, Murray was abruptly removed from his command, and he was replaced by Vice Admiral George Jones, who had been Murray's career-long rival since they were students in the first cohort of the Royal Naval College of Canada in 1911. The next day, a separate Naval Board of Inquiry under Rear Admiral Victor Brodeur was appointed to investigate naval participation in the disorders. The Kellock Commission placed considerable blame upon the Navy, and on Murray himself, for not having exercised better control over the sailors' celebrations ashore. The Naval Inquiry's findings were more balanced, finding that the riot was caused by several factors, including a failure in the naval command. Murray himself felt that responsibility lay mainly with the civil authorities of Halifax, and he was frustrated that the Kellock Commission effectively placed the Navy on trial without providing him or his officers with an opportunity to defend themselves. He asked for a court martial to clear his name, but this was not agreed. The Government made an attempt to leave the Admiral with his honour intact:

"It would be a regrettable thing if, resultant upon the Halifax disturbances, the truly great services of this officer and those under his command were to be forgotten by the people of Canada."—Canadian Government press release

Murray was never assigned another command. He received a letter on 6 September 1945 informing him that "the recent developments which have taken place in relation to the state of the war have materially changed the situation of the Armed Forces. As a result, there is no suitable appointment in which, having regard to your rank, you can be employed." Murray later said that, rather than fight the decision, "I thought it best to withdraw quietly. For the good of the service, I went into voluntary exile." Murray left Canada for the United Kingdom in September 1945, and officially retired from the Navy on 14 March 1946.

== Later years ==
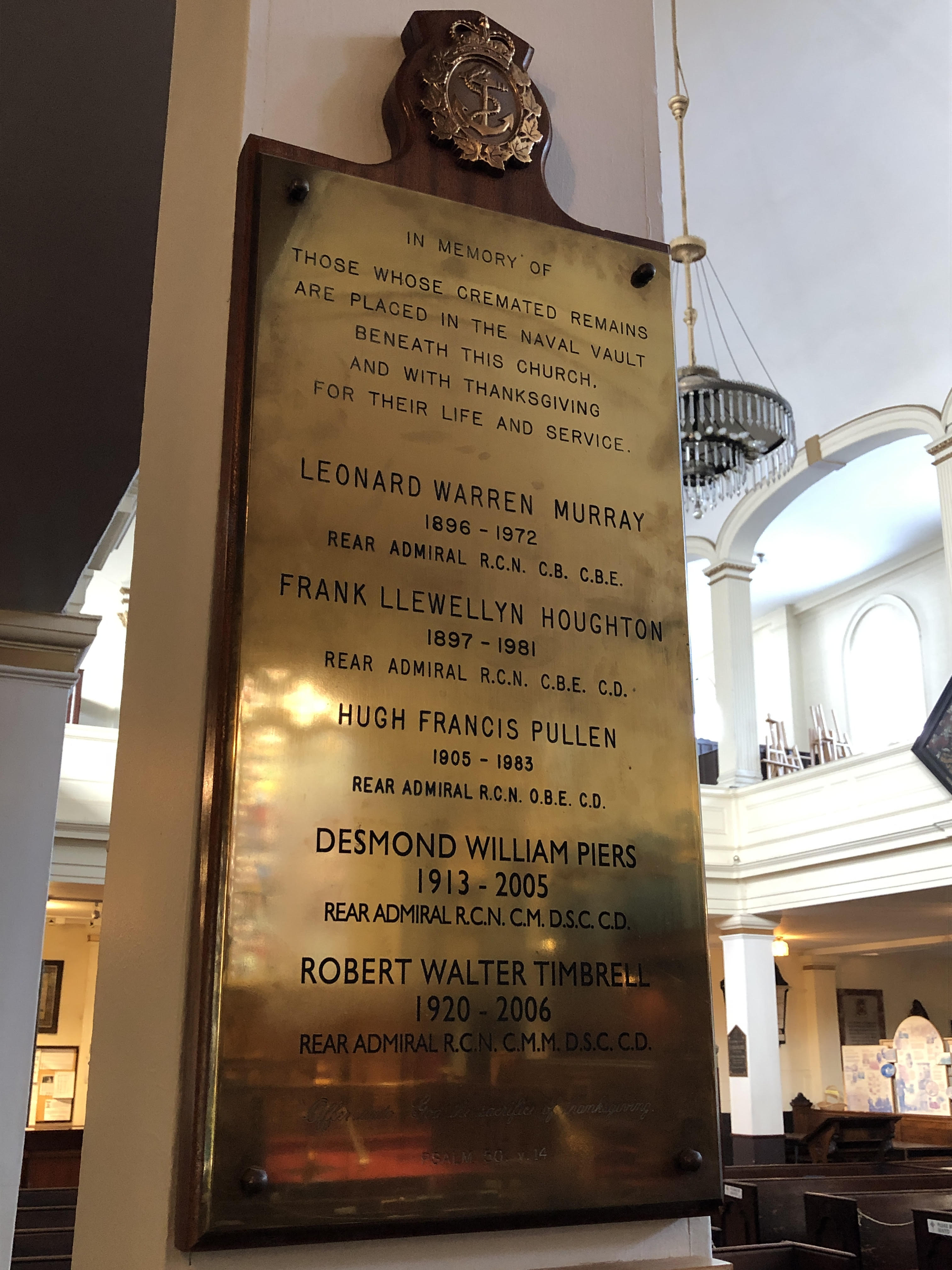
Ashes of Leonard Warren Murray Plaque, St. Paul's Church (Halifax, Nova Scotia)

Murray initially settled in East Grinstead, Sussex. He remained active in his retirement, qualifying as a lawyer at the Middle Temple on 17 November 1949, and, with his specialty in maritime law, he represented the British government at the 1950 enquiry into the accidental sinking of SS Hopestar.

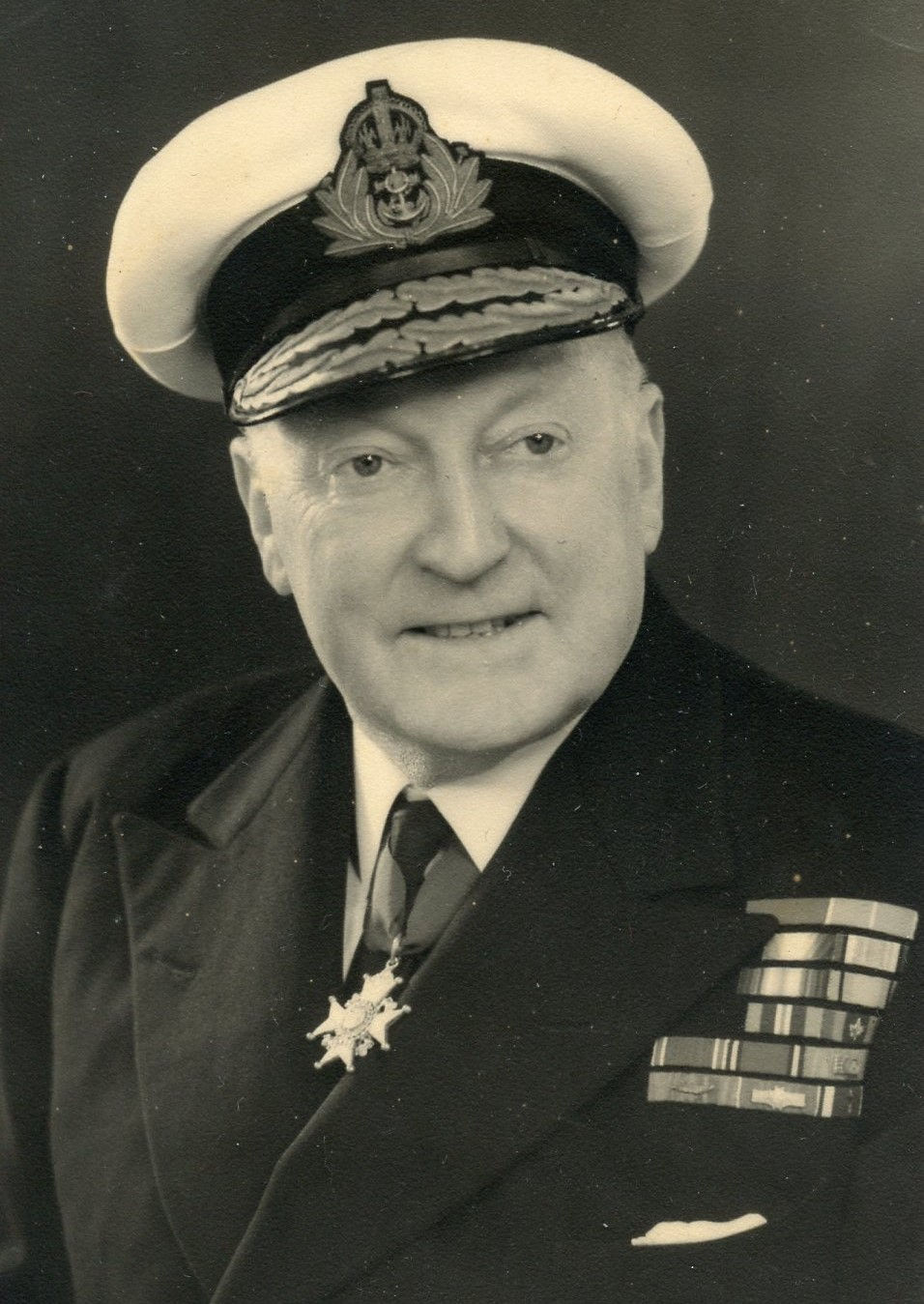
Rear Admiral (ret.) Murray in his retirement years, approximately 1965

He was a member of the West Hoathly Parish Council, and served as Vice-Chair of the Cuckfield Rural Council as well as on school boards. His love of the sea was kept alive by keen membership in the Bar Yacht Club where he was Racing Captain for ten years, and he also played a leadership role with the Sea Scouts, as well as serving as President of the West Hoathly Royal British Legion. Murray stopped practising law in 1960 to care for his ailing wife, who died in 1962. Following a chance meeting on a Greek cruise, Murray remarried on 23 August 1963, to a Russian exile and ophthalmic surgeon Antonina Schcheyteenin.

He dabbled in British politics, becoming a member of the Conservative Party and ran unsuccessfully as a candidate in municipal council elections in Buxton in 1965. Throughout the mid-1960s Murray engaged in a spirited debate with the Canadian military establishment, the media and Prime Minister Pearson wherein he opposed the Unification of the Canadian Armed Forces, which also ended the distinct identity of the Royal Canadian Navy. The Maritime Command of the Canadian Armed Forces was renamed back to the Royal Canadian Navy on 16 August 2011. Although clearly feeling that Canada had abandoned him following the Halifax Riot, Murray maintained his ties to Canada, making his last visit to Canada in 1970, when he unveiled the Battle of the Atlantic stained-glass window in the chapel at CFB Halifax, and took the salute in the 25th-anniversary celebrations of the Battle of the Atlantic in Halifax.

Murray died peacefully in Buxton on 25 November 1971. He was survived by his second wife, and two sons from his first marriage, who both served as officers in the Royal Navy. His ashes were placed in St Paul's Church in Halifax on 17 September 1972, and his second wife's ashes were placed there alongside his on 10 July 2015.

== Legacy ==
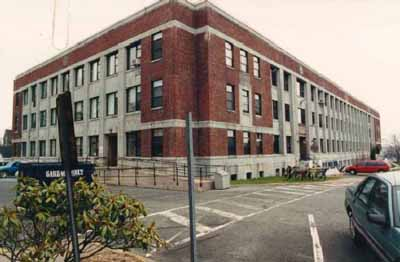
Murray Building at CFB Halifax

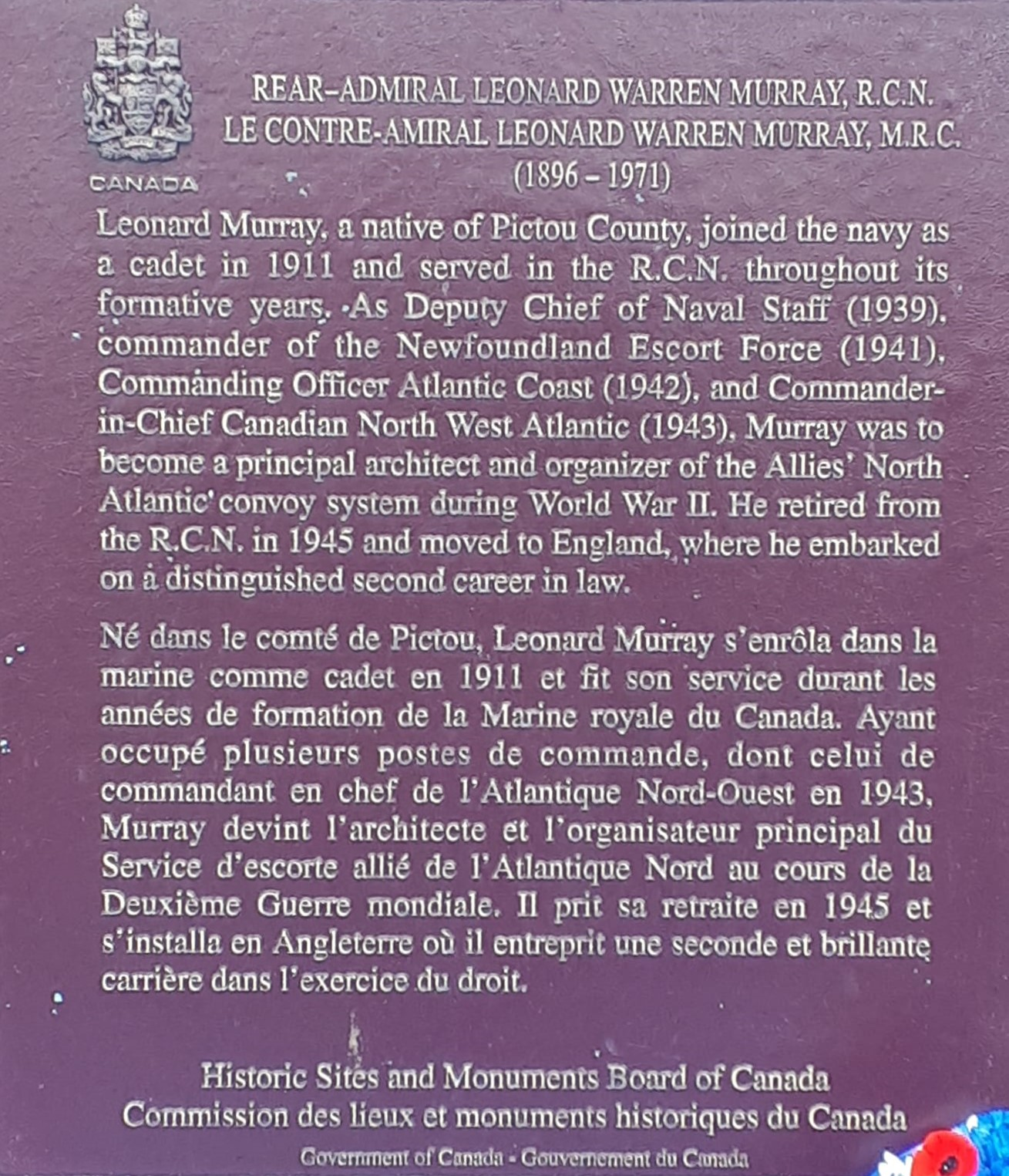
Admiral Murray memorial at Pictou Landing, Nova Scotia

Murray continued to be recognised in the Royal Canadian Navy, where the Admiral L.W. Murray Trophy for Gunnery Proficiency was awarded annually at least until the early 1970s. Since Murray's death, several commemorative steps have been taken, including the ceremonial naming in his honour of the Canadian Naval Operations School (CFNOS) building at CFB Halifax on 6 September 1985. A collection of his medals and related naval artifacts are displayed in the Murray Building in Halifax, and he is featured in standing exhibitions on the Battle of the Atlantic at the Juno Beach Centre and the Canadian War Museum, as well as highlighted on the official website of the Canadian Armed Forces. A statue of Murray was unveiled at the Battle of the Atlantic ceremonies in Ottawa in 2013.

On the civilian side, a Maritimes Branch of the Royal Canadian Naval Association was named after Admiral Murray, as well as the New Glasgow Branch of the Royal Canadian Sea Cadet Corps (disbanded in 2020). Admiral Murray was designated a National Historic Person in 1977, and on 26 July 1980 was commemorated with a Parks Canada plaque in Pictou Landing, where he grew up.

Another memorial was placed in his honour in Pictou on 14 October 2004. Murray's second wife established the Rear Admiral Leonard Warren Murray Bursary at Pictou Academy and, on 16 July 2019, Halifax Regional Council voted to name a street or park in downtown Halifax or near HMC Dockyard in his honour. In popular culture, on 1 September 2022, Leonard Murray was created as a character in the online game World of Warships: Legends.

== Quote ==
"Except for the few months at sea in Assiniboine, my war work was a solid slog, mostly at a desk, averaging 15 hours a day with frequently a full 24. My job was to obtain the greatest possible result from relatively inexperienced personnel. There was little opportunity for anyone to step on another's toes. They were spread too thinly and there was a more responsible job for each as soon as he felt confident of his ability to take it on. In the autumn of 1941 young volunteer reserve officers who had never seen salt water before the war took command of corvettes manned by 88 men—the number of white and black keys on a piano and each with his own peculiar note—and took their full part in the Battle of the Atlantic. Experience had taught me this: to find out what you're capable of, it is only necessary to get a chance to do it—and someone else must have enough confidence in you to provide that chance. In my dealings with the young RCNVR captains I did my best to give them the opportunity to find their own feet and they did it. Once having tasted success they never looked back. What a blessing that we had bright young people to accept this kind of responsibility"—Admiral Murray.

== Awards and decorations ==
The arrangement of medals replicated from Murray's uniform, which is held in the collections of the Canadian War Museum:

Ribbon	Description	Notes
Medal Ribbon of the Order of the Bath	Order of the Bath (CB)	Appointed Companion of the Order on 8 June 1944 (Citation)
	Order of the British Empire (CBE)	Military; Appointed Commander on 2 June 1943 (Citation)
	1914–15 Star	Decoration awarded on 31 December 1921
	British War Medal	1914–1918, WWI Decoration award date unknown
	Victory Medal	1914–1918, WWI Decoration award date unknown
	Defence Medal (United Kingdom)	Decoration awarded 10 February 1950
	WWII War Medal 1939–1945	Decoration awarded 10 February 1950
	Canadian Volunteer Service Medal	with Overseas Service bar Decoration awarded 10 February 1950
	King George VI Coronation Medal	Decoration awarded on 12 May 1937
	King George V Silver Jubilee Medal	Decoration awarded on 6 May 1935
	Legion of Honour	Decoration awarded on 7 November 1945; Commander level; France award
	Croix de Guerre 1939–1945 with palm	Decoration awarded on 7 November 1945 (Citation); France award
	Legion of Merit	Decoration awarded on 6 May 1946 (Citation); Commander level; United States award
	King Haakon VII Freedom Cross	Decoration awarded in 1948 (Citation); Norway award

== See also ==
- Military history of Nova Scotia
- History of the Royal Canadian Navy
