= Granton =

Granton may refer to:

== Places ==
Australia

- Granton, Tasmania

Canada

- Granton, Nova Scotia
- Granton, Ontario, a village part of the Lucan Biddulph township

Scotland

- Granton, Edinburgh

United States

- Granton, Wisconsin

== Other uses ==
- A "granton edge", a type of edge detailing on a kitchen knife

== See also ==
- Grantown-on-Spey, a town in Scotland
