= Canadian Northwest Atlantic =

Canadian Northwest Atlantic Command was the zone of operations during the Battle of the Atlantic that stretched from north of New York City to 47 degrees west. It was set up at the Atlantic Convoy Conference, held in Washington, D.C., from 1–12 March 1943, and placed under the command of Rear-Admiral Leonard W. Murray on 30 April 1943 with its headquarters in Halifax, Nova Scotia. It was notable for being the only Allied theatre of operations commanded by a Canadian during the war.

U.S. contribution to the Atlantic convoys was organised initially through the Support Force, Atlantic Fleet, initially Task Force 6 first commanded by Rear Admiral Arthur L. Bristol succeeded by Vice Admiral Rolland M. Brainard, and then Task Force 24 under Admiral Jesse B. Oldendorf.

== Atlantic Convoy Conference ==
At the Casablanca Conference held in January 1943, the Allied Chiefs of Staff agreed to hold another meeting in a couple of months' time to address outstanding matters relating to Atlantic convoys. Each of the three major allies involved, Canada, United Kingdom and the United States all had particular issues they wished resolved. The British wished to raise the idea of a supreme Allied commander for all the anti-submarine operations in the Atlantic, and were intending to propose Admiral Horton, then based in Liverpool, to be that person. The Canadians had assumed a major role in the escorting of North Atlantic convoys and wished to close the US Task Force 234 in Argentia, Newfoundland, and create a North-West Atlantic Command under Canadian command. The US representatives wished to withdraw from convoy escort duties in the North Atlantic, as they wanted to concentrate on the mid-Atlantic, and felt that the British and Canadians were now in a position to assume that responsibility.

At the Atlantic Convoy Conference, Admiral Ernest J. King, Chief of Naval Operations and Commander in Chief of the United States Navy, met with Admiral Sir Percy Noble, Admiral Sir Henry Moore and Rear-Admiral Mansfield (formerly Chief of Staff to the C-in-C Western Approaches) of the Royal Navy, Air Vice-Marshal Durston of the Royal Air Force and Rear-Admiral Victor-Gabriel Brodeur of the Royal Canadian Navy.

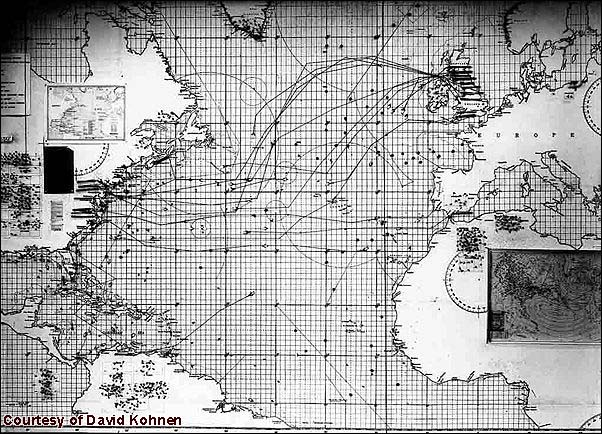
North Atlantic Plot April 1944

King proposed a re-alignment of authority. After deliberation, the idea was endorsed by the delegations. According to the arrangement, Britain and Canada shared the responsibility of controlling the North Atlantic seaways, while the US Navy assumed control over the central and southern Atlantic.

Shortly after the conference, King created the United States Tenth Fleet. Vessels were not specifically assigned to Tenth Fleet, and the organization served as an anti-submarine command.

== See also ==
- Canadian Encyclopedia: Battle of the Atlantic
- Juno Beach Centre: Admiral L.W. Murray
