= SS Hopestar =

Former cargo ship

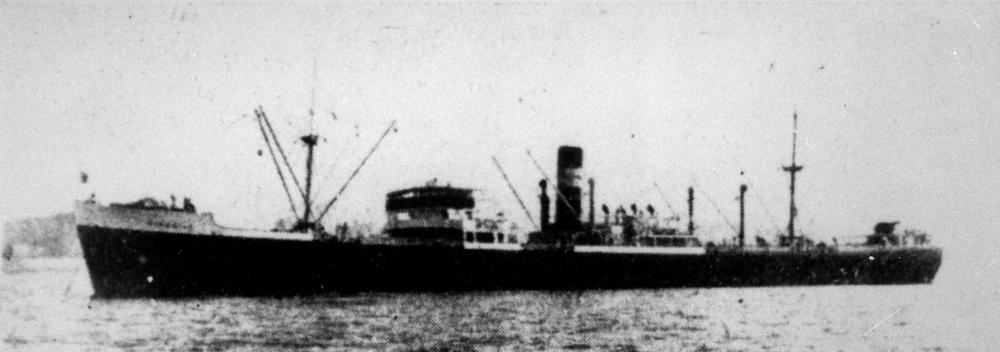
- Hopestar

History
- Name: Hopestar
- Owner: Wallsend Shipping Co Ltd
- Operator: Arthur Stott & Co Ltd (1936–38); Stott, Mann & Fleming Ltd (1938–48)
- Port of registry: (United Kingdom) Newcastle upon Tyne
- Builder: Swan, Hunter & Wigham Richardson Ltd
- Yard number: 1513
- Launched: 22 January 1936
- Completed: February 1936
- Maiden voyage: 29 February 1936
- Out of service: 14 November 1948
- Identification: UK official number 161592; Call sign GYRL
- Fate: Foundered 1948

General characteristics
- Type: Cargo ship
- Tonnage: 5,267 GRT, 3,193 NRT, 9,800 DWT
- Length: 416.8 ft (127.0 m)
- Beam: 57.4 ft (17.5 m)
- Draught: 29 ft 6 in (9.0 m)
- Depth: 27.0 ft (8.2 m)
- Decks: 1
- Installed power: 2 steam turbines, 2,000 bhp (1,500 kW)
- Propulsion: Single screw propeller
- Speed: 12 knots (22 km/h)

SS Hopestar was a 5,267 GRT cargo ship that was built in 1936 by Swan, Hunter and Wigham Richardson Ltd, Newcastle upon Tyne, Northumberland for the Wallsend Shipping Co Ltd. She sank off the coast of Newfoundland in 1948 with the loss of all 40 crew.

== Description ==
Hopestar was 416.8 ft (127.0 m) long, with a beam of 57.4 ft (17.5 m). She had a depth of 27.0 ft (8.2 m) and a draught of 29 ft 6 in (9.0 m). Her tonnages were 5,267 GRT, 3,191 NRT and 9,800 DWT. She was powered by two Parsons steam turbines, double reduction geared and driving a single screw propeller. The turbines were a high-pressure and a low-pressure unit, working in series. Together, they were rated at 2,000 brake horsepower (1,500 kW). This gave the ship a maximum speed of 12 knots (22 km/h; 14 mph). The ship's boilers were built by the North Eastern Marine Engineering Co Ltd.

== History ==
=== Early history ===
Hopestar was built as yard number 1513 by Swan, Hunter and Wigham Richardson Ltd, Newcastle upon Tyne, Northumberland for the Wallsend Shipping Co Ltd. Launched on 22 January 1936, she was completed in February 1936. Hopestar was operated under the management of Arthur Stott & Co Ltd. Her port of registry was Newcastle upon Tyne. The Code Letters GYRL and United Kingdom Official Number 161532 were allocated. Following completion of sea trials on 27 February 1936, her maiden voyage was on 29 February. It took her to Spain, Durban, South Africa and the Netherlands East Indies. In 1938, her managers were changed to Stott, Mann & Fleming Ltd.

=== World War II ===
When the Second World War broke out, Hopestar was at Bunbury, Western Australia. She sailed that day for London, which was reached on 28 November 1939 via Fremantle, Durban, Cape Town, Freetown and Belfast. During 1940, she crossed the Atlantic Ocean three times in the first six months, mostly sailing independently but sometimes in convoy. On 9 January 1940, Hopestar came under attack in the North Sea off Cromer from a U-boat. Three torpedoes were fired at her but they were evaded. Her captain was awarded an OBE for his seamanship. One of her gunners was awarded a BEM for his part in driving off the submarine. The second half of 1940 saw her sailing to Buenos Aires, returning to the United Kingdom in December 1940.

Hopestar was then out of service for three months, departing from the Belfast Lough on 25 March 1941 for the River Tyne, where she arrived on 1 April. She was then out of service until 2 August when she sailed from Sunderland, County Durham on a voyage that would take her to Freetown, Cape Town, Durban, Aden, Suez, Port Said, Alexandria, Beirut and Haifa, which was reached on 20 December. Hopestar returned to the United Kingdom via Port Said, Suez, Aden, Mauritius, Durban and Freetown. She arrived at Southend-on-Sea on 20 April 1942. She sailed a week later on a voyage that would take her to New York, Key West, Trinidad, Cape Town, Durban and Bombay, India, where she arrived on 28 October 1942.

Hopestar departed from Bombay on 4 January 1943. She spent the next few months sailing the coast of Africa, arriving at Gibraltar on 20 July and sailing three days later for the River Tyne, which was reached on 8 August. She sailed on 28 September to make a round trip to Montreal, returning to Southend-on-Sea on 21 December.

Hopestar sailed on 13 January 1944, remaining in British waters and arriving at the Clyde on 13 February. She sailed on 2 May for various ports in the Mediterranean, always in convoy at this time. She arrived back at Southend-on-Sea on 15 August. Hopestar departed on 25 August for a return trip across the Atlantic Ocean to Boston, Massachusetts, United States. She was in convoy throughout the voyage and returned to Liverpool on 31 December.

Hopestar sailed on 14 February 1945 for Cardiff and Milford Haven, where she arrived on 3 March. She sailed the next day for Africa, in convoy for the last time. She was at Accra when the war in Europe ended. Hopestar returned to Liverpool on 12 June, sailing two weeks later for Charleston, South Carolina, United States, which is where she was when the war finally ended. She again sailed Mediterranean waters before arriving at Middlesbrough, Yorkshire on 14 November.

=== Post-war ===
In 1947, a third boiler was installed in Hopestar. It was later determined that this weakened the structure of the vessel and may have contributed to her loss. In June 1948, Hopestar underwent a routine survey, which she passed. On 14 November 1948, Hopestar was reported to be 450 nautical miles (830 km) off St John's, Newfoundland, Canada. She reported her position by radio at 01:00. It was reported by the ship that she had been damaged by heavy weather, with a Force 9 gale blowing at the time. The last report from Hopestar was at 12:00 that day, when she was at 43°00′N 56°08′W.

She was on a voyage from Newcastle upon Tyne to Philadelphia, Pennsylvania, United States and was in ballast at the time. She was to collect a cargo of grain to return to the United Kingdom with. By 23 November, seven aircraft were involved in the search for Hopestar. On 24 November, Captain W. R. Richards of the United States Coast Guard said "we feel that there is little possibility that any survivors are left alive." On 25 November, Hopestar was declared to have foundered with the loss of all hands. The search was abandoned on 26 November. No wreckage from Hopestar was ever found.

The Board of Trade held an enquiry into the loss of Hopestar. It was held in London on 4-6, 9-13, 16-17 and 26–28 January 1950. It was concluded that Hopestar had probably broke in two and foundered with the loss of all 40 of her crew. The possibility that she struck a mine could not be discounted, but was thought unlikely. Stan Awbery asked questions in the House of Commons on 20 March 1950 but they were never satisfactorily answered.
