= Granton, Nova Scotia =

Community in Nova Scotia, Canada

Coordinates: 45°37′25″N 62°44′15″W

Granton in Nova Scotia

Granton is a community in the Canadian province of Nova Scotia, located in Pictou County. It is the birthplace of Leonard W. Murray. The community was named for Granton, Edinburgh.
