= Victor Brodeur =

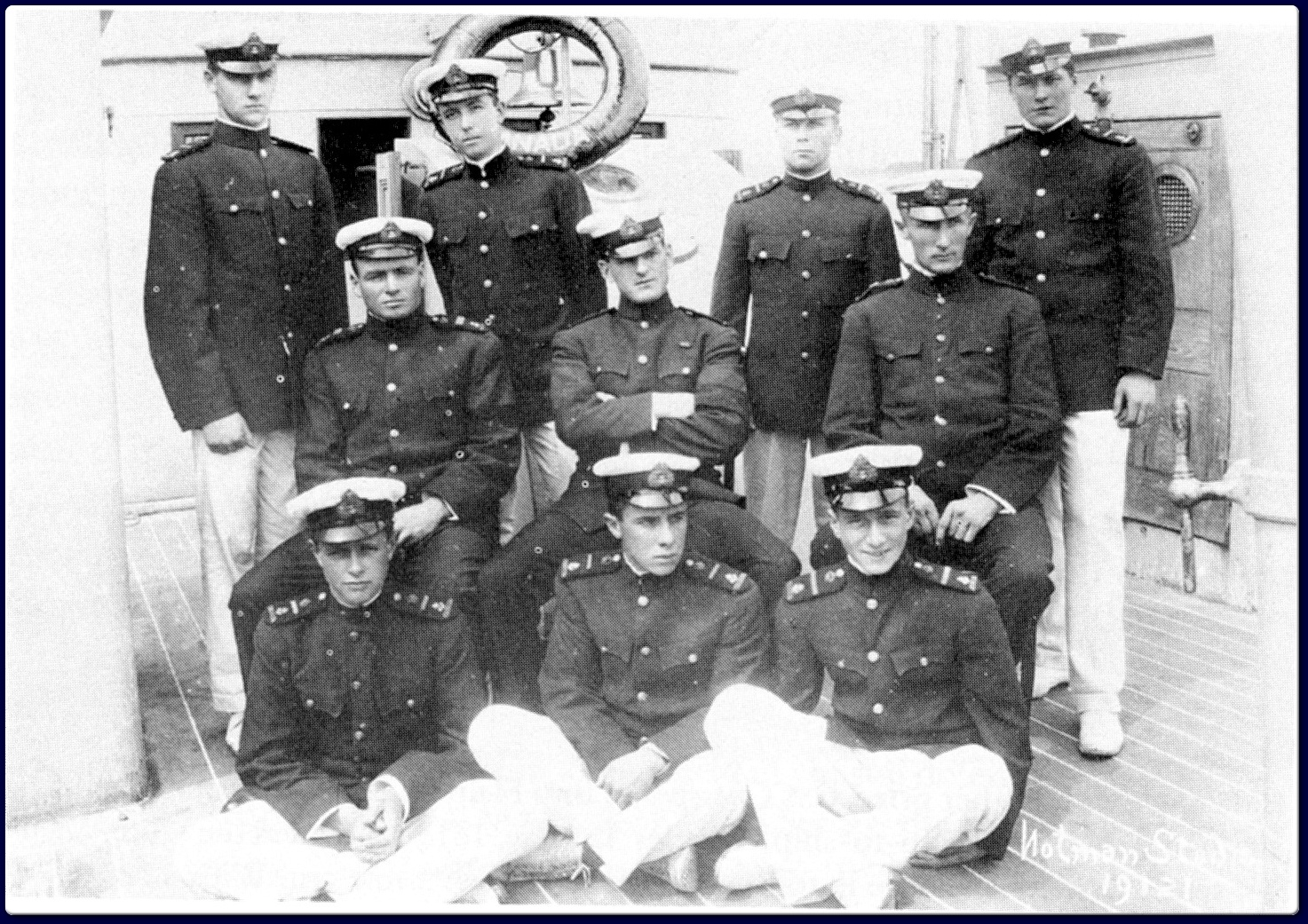

Rear-Admiral Victor Gabriel Brodeur, CB, CBE, CD (September 17, 1892 – October 6, 1976) was a Royal Canadian Navy officer. He was a member of the first batch of cadets accepted into the RCN and the first French speaker to reach the rank of rear admiral.

Brodeur was the son of the politician and judge Louis-Philippe Brodeur, who as Minister of the Naval Service introduced the Naval Service Act which created the Naval Service of Canada. In 1909, he was appointed officer cadet and assigned to CGS Canada, as part of the Navy's first group of six cadets. Of the six, only Percy Nelles rose higher in rank.

Appointed midshipman in 1910, he served in HMCS Niobe before being transferred to HMS Dreadnought in 1911. Appointed sub-lieutenant in 1913, he served in HMS Berwick in 1914 during the Mexican Revolution.

In 1932, when El Salvador was in the throes of a peasant uprising and military coup overthrowing the government, Brodeur was commanding HMCS Skeena and senior officer of the Canadian Pacific flotilla when his ship and HMCS Vancouver were directed to the port of Acajutla, in response to a request by the United Kingdom to protect British citizens and interests in the country until a Royal Navy ship could arrive.

His son Nigel Brodeur reached the rank of vice admiral in the Royal Canadian Navy.
