= HMCS Skeena (D59) =

Canadian River-class destroyer

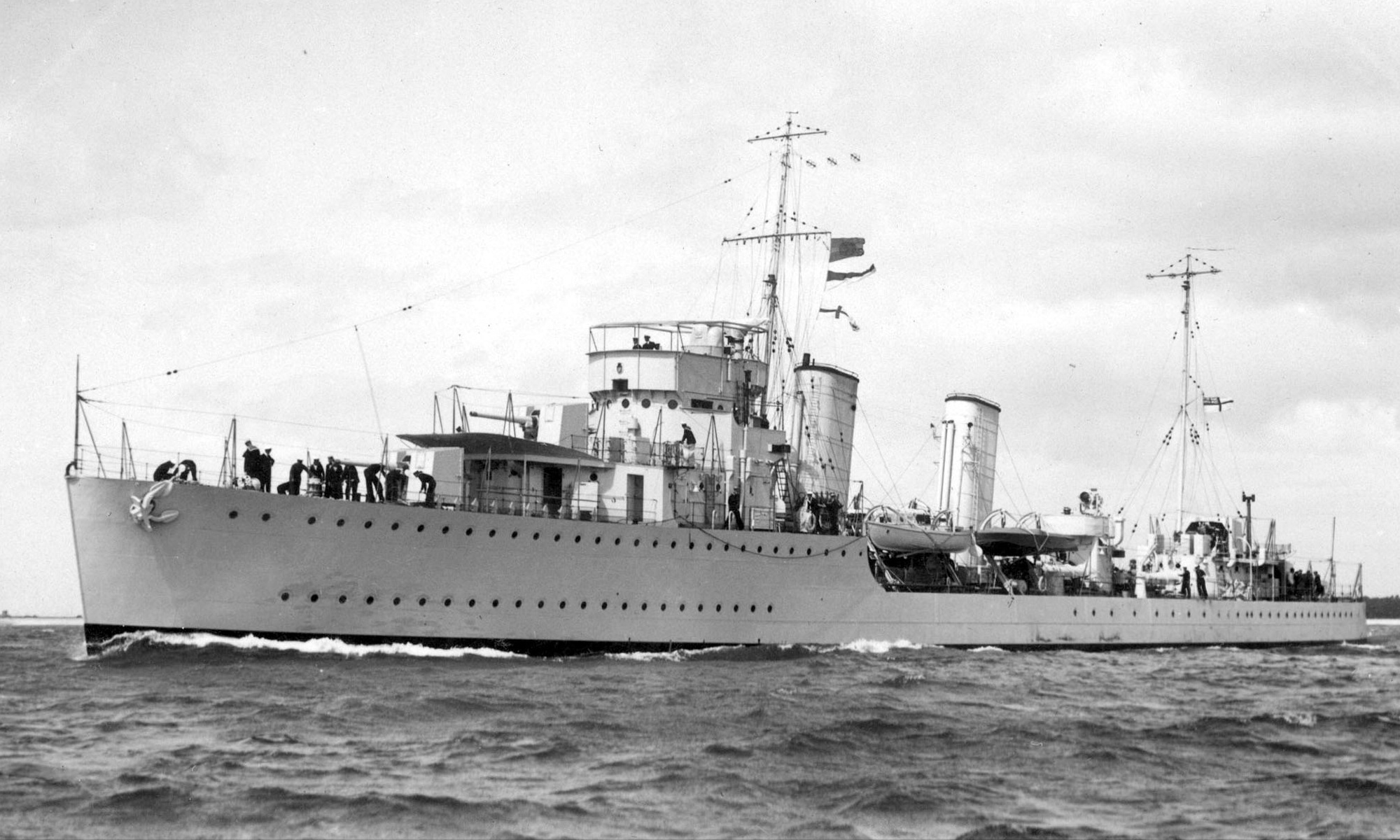
- Skeena at sea

History

Canada
- Name: Skeena
- Namesake: Skeena River
- Ordered: 6 March 1928
- Builder: John I. Thornycroft & Company, Woolston
- Yard number: 1092
- Laid down: 14 October 1929
- Launched: 10 October 1930
- Commissioned: 10 June 1931
- Honours and awards: Atlantic 1939–44; Normandy 1944; Biscay 1944
- Fate: Wrecked 25 October 1944 during a storm off Reykjavík, Iceland.
- Badge: Blazon Azure, out of a base invected argent, a salmon sinisterwise proper.

General characteristics
- Class & type: A-class destroyer; River-class destroyer
- Displacement: 1,337 long tons (1,358 t)
- Length: 321 ft 3 in (97.92 m) o/a; 309 ft (94 m) p/p
- Beam: 32 ft 9 in (9.98 m)
- Draught: 10 ft (3.0 m)
- Speed: 31 knots (57 km/h; 36 mph)
- Complement: 181
- Armament: Original; 4 × QF 4.7 inch (120 mm) guns; 8 × tubes for 21 inch (533 mm) torpedoes (2×4); 2 × QF 2-pounder (40 mm) guns; Wartime modifications; 2 × QF 4.7 inch (120 mm) guns; 1 × QF 12-pounder (3 inch (76 mm)) gun; 4 × tubes for 21-inch (530 mm) torpedoes (1×4); 6 × QF 20 mm Oerlikon guns; Hedgehog anti-submarine mortar

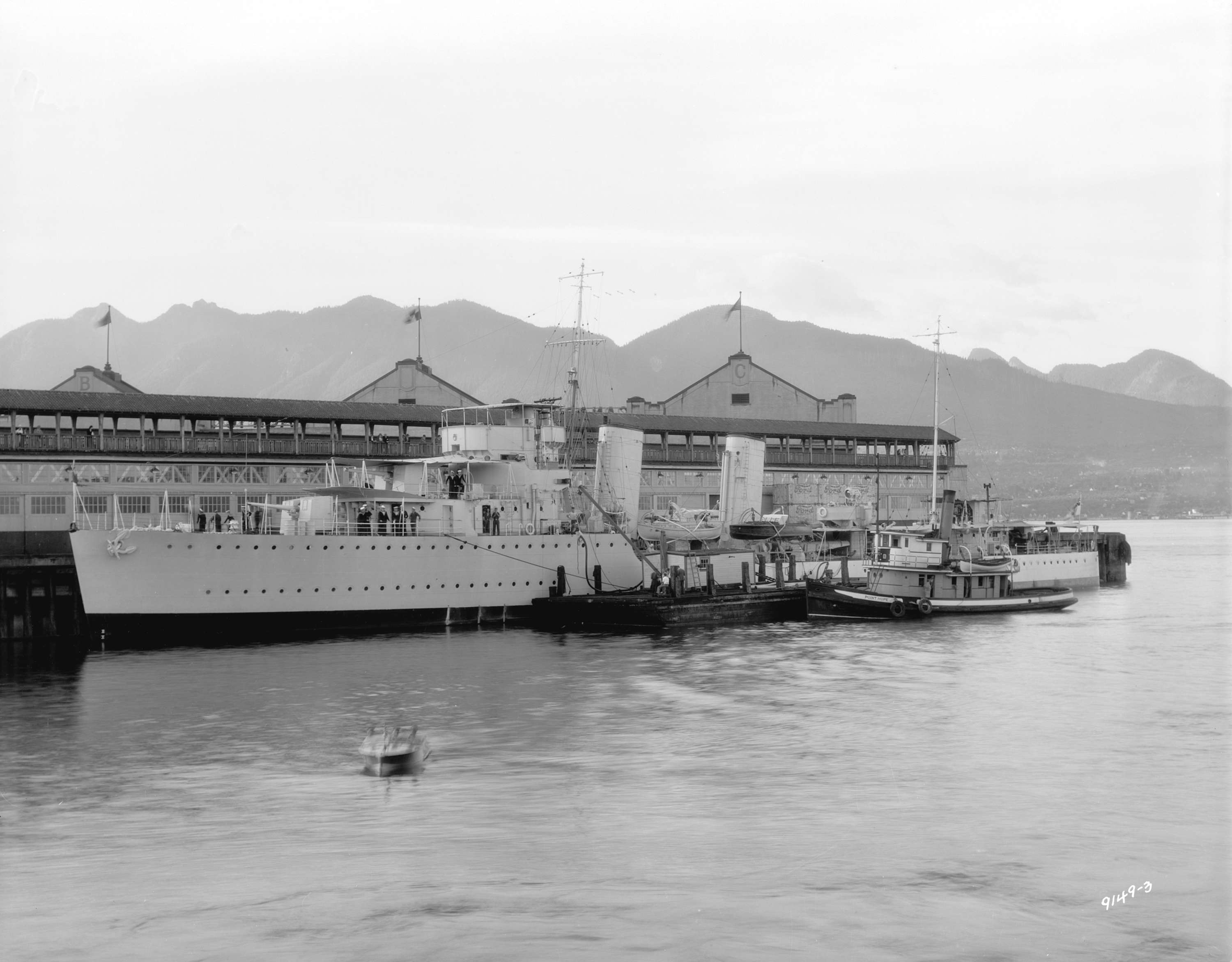
Skeena alongside the CPR's Vancouver pier C in 1934

HMCS Skeena was a River-class destroyer that served in the Royal Canadian Navy (RCN) from 1931 to 1944. She was similar to the Royal Navy's A class and wore initially the pennant D59, changed in 1940 to I59.

She was built by John I. Thornycroft & Company at Woolston, Hampshire and commissioned into the RCN on 10 June 1931 at Portsmouth, England. Skeena and her sister HMCS Saguenay were the first ships specifically built for the Royal Canadian Navy. She arrived in Halifax, Nova Scotia on 3 July 1931.

== Second World War ==
Skeena rescued 65 survivors of the British merchant ship Manipur, sunk by U-57 off Cape Wrath on 17 July 1940. On 2 September 1940 she rescued 19 survivors of the British merchant ship Thornlea, sunk by U-46 in the North Atlantic. On 14 October 1940 Skeena and the corvette HMS Periwinkle rescued 220 members of the crew of HMS Cheshire, which U-137 had damaged by torpedo. On 23 November 1940 Skeena rescued 6 survivors of the Norwegian merchant ship Bruce, damaged by U-100 and 9 survivors of the Norwegian merchant ship Salonica, sunk by U-100 nearby.

Skeena was assigned to North Atlantic convoy Escort Group C-3 escorting convoys ON 93, HX 191, ONS 104, SC 90, ON 115, HX 202, ON 121, SC 98, ON 131, HX 210, ON 141, SC 109, ONS 152 prior to refit in January 1943. On 31 July 1942, Skeena recorded her first victory with HMCS Wetaskiwin when they depth charged and sank U-588 while escorting ON 115 at 49°59′N 36°36′W.

=== Trans-Atlantic convoys escorted ===
Convoy	Escort Group	Dates	Notes
HX 141		30 July-6 Aug 1941	Newfoundland to Iceland
SC 42		2-17 Sept 1941	Newfoundland to Iceland
SC 54		12-22 Nov 1941	Newfoundland to Iceland
ON 40		30 Nov-4 Dec 1941	Iceland to Newfoundland
SC 63		5-10 Jan 1942	Newfoundland to Iceland
SC 79	MOEF group C3	19–27 April 1942	Newfoundland to Northern Ireland
ON 93	MOEF group C3	9–15 May 1942	Northern Ireland to Newfoundland
HX 191	MOEF group C3	28 May-5 June 1942	Newfoundland to Northern Ireland
ON 104	MOEF group C3	18–27 June 1942	Northern Ireland to Newfoundland
SC 90	MOEF group C3	6–16 July 1942	Newfoundland to Northern Ireland
ON 115	MOEF group C3	25–31 July 1942	Northern Ireland to Newfoundland
HX 202	MOEF group C3	12-17 Aug 1942	Newfoundland to Iceland
ON 121	MOEF group C3	17-20 Aug 1942	Iceland to Newfoundland
SC 98	MOEF group C3	2-12 Sept 1942	Newfoundland to Northern Ireland
ON 131	MOEF group C3	19-28 Sept 1942	Northern Ireland to Newfoundland
HX 210	MOEF group C3	7-15 Oct 1942	Newfoundland to Northern Ireland
ON 141	MOEF group C3	26 Oct-2 Nov 1942	Northern Ireland to Newfoundland
SC 109	MOEF group C3	16-25 Nov 1942	Newfoundland to Northern Ireland
ON 152	MOEF group C3	10-19 Dec 1942	Northern Ireland to Newfoundland
HX 233	MOEF group A3	12–20 April 1943	Newfoundland to Northern Ireland
ON 180	MOEF group C3	25 April-7 May 1943	Northern Ireland to Newfoundland
HX 238	MOEF group C3	13–20 May 1943	Newfoundland to Northern Ireland
ON 187		3–10 June 1943	Northern Ireland to Newfoundland
HX 244		20–29 June 1943	Newfoundland to Northern Ireland
ON 192		10–18 July 1943	Northern Ireland to Newfoundland
HX 249		29 July-5 Aug 1943	Newfoundland to Northern Ireland
HX 255		8-15 Sept 1943	Newfoundland to Northern Ireland
HX 261		17-25 Oct 1943	Newfoundland to Northern Ireland
ON 210		7-17 Nov 1943	Northern Ireland to Newfoundland
SC 147		23 Nov-3 Dec 1943	Newfoundland to Northern Ireland
ON 216		17-29 Dec 1943	Northern Ireland to Newfoundland

== Grounding ==
Skeena was lost in a storm on the night of 24 October 1944. She was anchored off Reykjavík, Iceland and dragged her anchor and grounded in 50-foot (15 m) waves off Viðey Island with the loss of 15 crewmembers.

Her hulk was paid off and sold to Iceland interests in June 1945; she was then raised and broken up. Her propeller was salvaged and used in a memorial near the Viðey Island ferry terminal.
