= HMCS Annapolis (DDH 265) =

Destroyer of the Royal Canadian Navy

Coordinates: 49°26′57″N 123°19′51″W

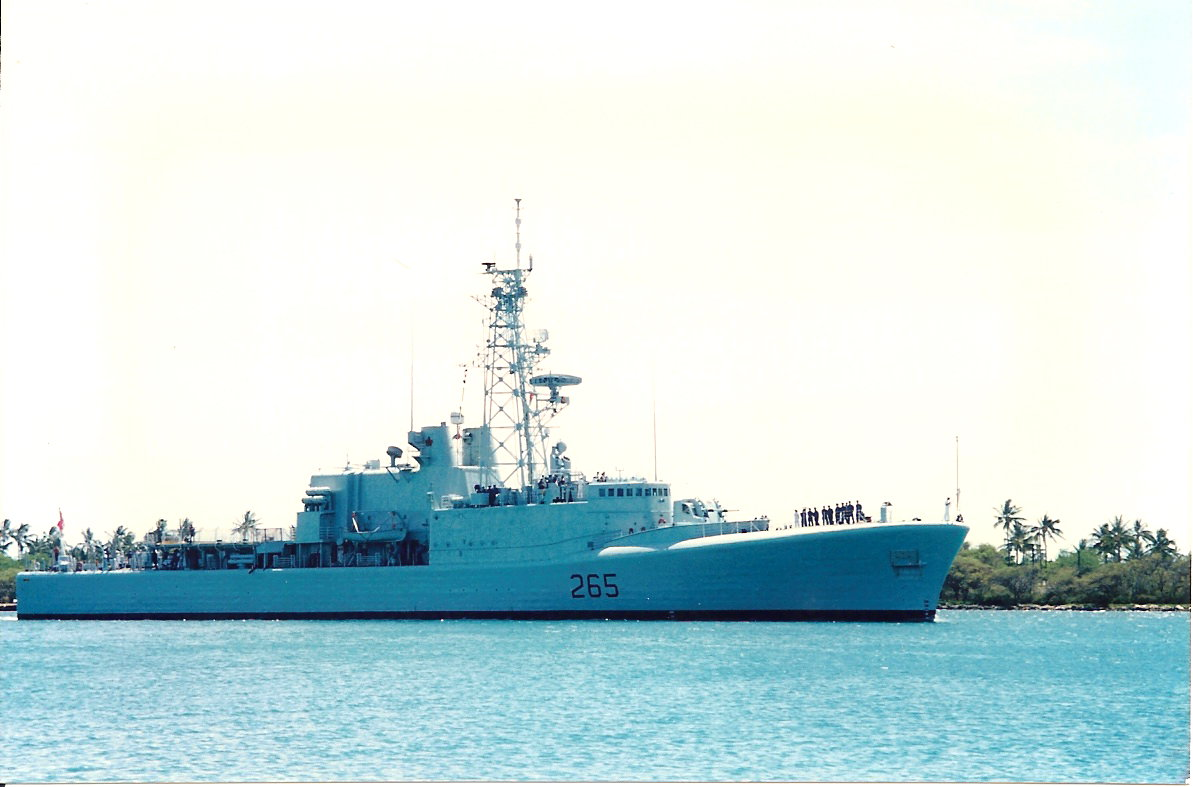
- Annapolis off Pearl Harbor in 1995

History

Canada
- Name: Annapolis
- Namesake: Annapolis River
- Builder: Halifax Shipyards Ltd., Halifax
- Laid down: 2 September 1961
- Launched: 27 April 1963
- Commissioned: 19 December 1964
- Decommissioned: 15 November 1996
- Refit: 15 September 1986 (DELEX)
- Honours and awards: Atlantic 1941–43
- Fate: Sunk as artificial reef, 4 April 2015

General characteristics
- Class & type: Annapolis-class destroyer
- Displacement: 3,420 long tons (3,474.9 t) full load
- Length: 366 ft (111.6 m)
- Beam: 42 ft (12.8 m)
- Draught: 23.5 ft (7.2 m)
- Propulsion: 2-shaft English-Electric geared steam turbines; 2 Babcock & Wilcox boilers; 30,000 shp (22,000 kW)
- Speed: 28 kn (52 km/h; 32 mph)
- Complement: 228
- Sensors & processing systems: Original: 1 × SPS-12 air search radar; 1 × SPS-10B surface search radar; 1 × Sperry Mk.2 navigation radar; 1 × URN 20 TACAN radar; 1 × SQS-501 high frequency bottom profiler sonar; 1 × SQS-502 high frequency mortar control sonar; 1 × SQS-503 hull mounted active search sonar; 1 × SQS-504 VDS medium frequency active search sonar; 1 × UQC-1B "Gertrude" underwater telephone; 1 × Mk 64 GFCS fire control with SPG-48 tracker (GUNAR); DELEX: 1 × Marconi SPS-503 air search radar; 1 × Raytheon/Sylvania SPS-502 surface search radar; 1 × Sperry Mk.127E navigation radar; 1 × URN 25 TACAN radar; 1 × SQS-505(V) or SQS-510 hull mounted active search sonar; 1 × SQS-504 VDS medium frequency active search sonar; 1 × SQR-19(V) CANTASS towed array sonar; 1 × UQC-1B "Gertrude" underwater telephone; 1 × Mk 64 GFCS fire control with SPG-515 tracker
- Electronic warfare & decoys: Original: 1 × ULQ-6 jammer; 1 × WLR-1C radar analyzer; 1 × UPD-501 radar detector; 1 × SRD-501 HF/DF; DELEX: 1 × SLQ-501 intercept (CANEWS); 1 × ULQ-6 jammer; 1 × SRD-501 HF/DF
- Armament: Original: 1 × FMC 3-inch/50 Mk.33 twin; 1 × Mk. NC 10 Limbo ASW mortar; 1 × Mk.4 thrower with homing torpedoes; DELEX: 1 × FMC 3-inch/50 Mk.33 twin; 2 × triple Mk.32 12.75 inch torpedo tubes firing Mk.44 or Mk.46 Mod 5 torpedoes
- Aircraft carried: 1 CH-124 Sea King ASW helicopter
- Aviation facilities: Midships helicopter deck and hangar with Beartrap.

HMCS Annapolis was an Annapolis-class destroyer that served in the Royal Canadian Navy and later, the Canadian Forces. She was the second Canadian naval unit to carry this name. Named for the Annapolis River that flows through Nova Scotia, the ship entered service in 1964, the last of the St. Laurent-class design. Serving through the Cold War, Annapolis was decommissioned in 1998 before going through a protracted legal battle for use as an artificial reef. She was finally scuttled as such in April 2015 in Howe Sound, British Columbia.

== Design and description ==
The Royal Canadian Navy had intended to place a six ship order under the Mackenzie class of destroyer escorts; however, during the design phase, the last two vessels ordered were altered to the St. Laurent-class DDH design and were classed under the new Annapolis designation.

The ships measured 366 feet (112 m) in length, with a beam of 42 feet (13 m) and a draught of 13 feet 2 inches (4.01 m). (Note: Macpherson and Barrie have the ships at 371 feet long, and a draught of 13 feet 8 inches.) Initially, the ships displaced 2,400 tonnes (2,400 long tons) (Note: Macpherson and Barrie states that the displacement was 2,400 tons, while Conway's claims it was the same as the St. Laurent class, which was 2,000 tons.) and had a complement of 228. (Note: Macpherson and Barrie have the complement at 246. (12 officers and 234 enlisted))

The ships were powered by two Babcock & Wilcox boilers connected to the two-shaft English-Electric geared steam turbines providing 30,000 shaft horsepower (22,000 kW). This gave the ships a maximum speed of 28 knots (52 km/h; 32 mph).

The ships were initially armed with two 3-inch (76 mm)/50 caliber (Note: Caliber denotes the length of the barrel. In this case, 50 caliber means that the gun barrel is 50 times as long as it is in diameter) dual-purpose guns mounted in a single turret forward. The extra topweight of the helicopter required the return of the American Mk 33 3-inch gun over the heavier 3-inch/70 caliber guns used on the preceding class. The guns could fire 45 – 50 rounds per minute with a lifespan of 2,050 rounds. The guns were placed in a Mk 33 mount. The mounting allowed the guns to elevate from −15° to 85°. The elevation rate was 30° per second and train rate was 24° per second. The mounts could train 360°.

For anti-submarine warfare, the ships were armed with a Mk 10 Limbo mortar. The Limbo was a British-designed three-barrel mortar capable of launching a projectile shell between 400–1,000 yards (370–910 m). Placed on stabilized mountings, the projectiles always entered the water at the same angle. The total weight of the shell was 390 pounds (180 kg). They also had a Mk.4 thrower with homing torpedoes.

Initially the ships were outfitted with one SPS-12 air search radar, one SPS-10B surface search radar, and one Sperry Mk.2 navigation radar. For sensing below the surface, the class was given one SQS-501 high frequency bottom profiler sonar, one SQS-502 high frequency mortar control sonar, one SQS-503 hull mounted active search sonar and one SQS-504 VDS medium frequency active search sonar. For fire control purposes they were given one Mk 64 GFCS fire control with SPG-48 tracker (GUNAR).

The two Annapolis-class destroyers were built late enough to incorporate the helicopter hangar retrofitted to the St. Laurent class and the "Beartrap" haul-down device. This allowed the destroyer escorts to deploy with one CH-124 Sea King helicopter.

=== DELEX refit ===
The DEstroyer Life EXtension (DELEX) refit was born out of the need to extend the life of the steam-powered destroyer escorts of the Canadian Navy in the 1980s until the next generation of surface ship was built. Encompassing all the classes based on the initial St. Laurent (the remaining St. Laurent, Restigouche, Mackenzie, and Annapolis-class vessels), the DELEX upgrades were meant to improve their ability to combat modern Soviet submarines, and to allow them to continue to operate as part of NATO task forces.

The Annapolis class received the same sensor and communications upgrades that others in the St Laurent family of ships received, including the installation of a new tactical data system (ADLIPS), updated radars and sonars, fire control and satellite navigation. They also received the new Canadian Tactical Towed Array Sensor or CANTASS which was a long-range towed sonar array that was affixed to the stern, which replaced the older VDS. The class also received a new lattice mast.

They were given 12.75-inch (324 mm) torpedo tubes to allow them to fire Mark 46 torpedoes. However, the Limbo mortar was removed in order to install the CANTASS. This visibly altered the overall appearance of the ships.

== Service history ==
Annapolis was ordered in 1958, initially as a repeat Restigouche-class vessel. However in 1959, the last two repeat Restigouches were altered to incorporate variable depth sonar and a helicopter landing area. The ship was laid down on 2 September 1961 by Halifax Shipyards Ltd. at Halifax. Christened by Mrs. Miriam Nowlan, wife of George Nowlan M.P. for Digby—Annapolis—Kings three days before the ship's launch on 27 April 1963, Annapolis was commissioned into the Royal Canadian Navy on 19 December 1964 with the classification number 265.

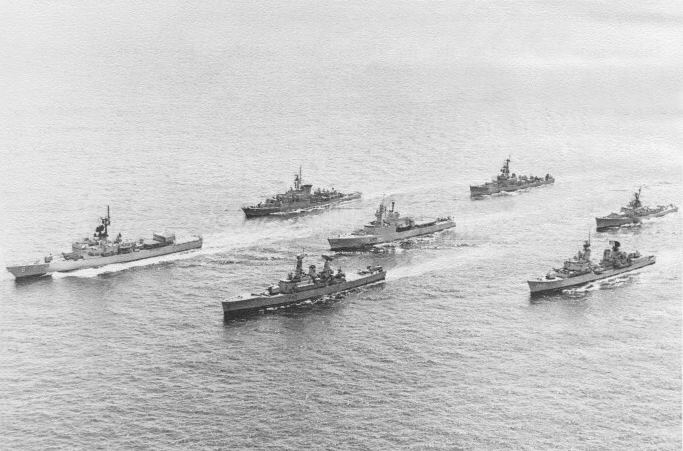
STANAVFORLANT in 1974. Annapolis is in the center

Annapolis served first with Maritime Forces Atlantic (MARLANT) and later with Maritime Forces Pacific (MARPAC). In 1965, Annapolis, while serving with MARLANT, Annapolis was ordered to the Dominican Republic as a show of Canadian support for the American intervention there. In 1970, Annapolis, with the destroyer Skeena and the replenishment ship Protecteur, participated in Manitoba's centennial celebrations, making port visits at Churchill, Rankin Inlet, Chesterfield Inlet and Wakeham Bay. Annapolis served as flagship in 1974 of STANAVFORLANT, the standing NATO fleet. In June, Annapolis rescued the crew of a Sea King helicopter which had ditched into the sea while attempting to land on the frigate USS Julius A. Furer. Annapolis later recovered the helicopter. In December, Annapolis boarded five Soviet fishing vessels in the Atlantic believing them to be illegally fishing. The ship later released them.

Annapolis underwent the DELEX refit from 19 August 1985 to 8 January 1987 at the Saint John Shipbuilding yards in Saint John, New Brunswick. Following completion of the refit, Annapolis took part in the large NATO naval exercise, Ocean Safari '87 and in Fall 1987, escorted the royal yacht HMY Britannia on the Great Lakes. In the late 1980s, she was used as the trial ship for the CANTASS towed sonar array system.

On 14 August 1989, Annapolis transferred to the Pacific coast, joining MARPAC. She arrived at Esquimalt, British Columbia on 25 September. From 3–7 June 1990, Annapolis was a Canadian task group that visited Vladivostok, Russia. In 1994, the destroyer was deployed as part of Operation Forward Action, the Canadian participation in the United Nations-sanctioned blockade of Haiti that year. She arrived off Haiti on 25 March and on 12 April, suffered an explosion in her port boiler. She remained on station for a further 30 days before returning to Esquimalt. The ship was removed from active service from Maritime Command on 15 November 1996 and placed in reserve. She was paid off on 1 July 1998 and stripped of all weapons and sensors before being laid up at CFB Esquimalt.

=== Sale for artificial reef ===
Annapolis was sold to the Artificial Reef Society of British Columbia (ARSBC) in 2008. She was sunk, after some years of legal disputes over environmental concerns, as an artificial reef and long-term marine habitat in Halkett Bay Provincial Park off Gambier Island in Howe Sound on 4 April 2015, in under two minutes. The wreck lies upright on the sea floor at a depth of 32 metres (105 ft) with the top of the ship reaching a depth of 10.5 metres (34 ft).
