= End Game (The X-Files) =

- The X-Files episode
- The USS Allegiance, stranded in the Arctic
- Episode no.: Season 2 Episode 17
- Directed by: Rob Bowman
- Written by: Frank Spotnitz
- Production code: 2X17
- Original air date: February 17, 1995
- Running time: 45 minutes

Guest appearances
- Steven Williams as X; Peter Donat as William Mulder; Brian Thompson as the Alien Bounty Hunter; Megan Leitch as Samantha Mulder; Colin Cunningham as Lt. Wilmer; Mitch Pileggi as Walter Skinner

Episode chronology
| ← Previous "Colony" | Next → "Fearful Symmetry" |
- The X-Files season 2

"End Game" is the seventeenth episode of the second season of the American science fiction television series The X-Files. It premiered on the Fox network on February 17, 1995. It was directed by Rob Bowman, and written by Frank Spotnitz. "End Game" featured guest appearances by Megan Leitch, Peter Donat, Brian Thompson and saw Steven Williams reprise his role as X.

The show centers on FBI special agents Fox Mulder (David Duchovny) and Dana Scully (Gillian Anderson) who work on cases linked to the paranormal, called X-Files. In this episode, Scully is kidnapped by an alien bounty hunter and Mulder offers his sister Samantha (Leitch) forward as ransom. However, Samantha is merely one of several clones created as part of a human-alien hybrid project, leading Mulder to pursue the bounty hunter for the truth about her disappearance. "End Game" is a two-part episode, continuing the plot from the previous episode, "Colony", and it helps explore the series' overarching mythology.

"End Game" was the first episode of the series written by Spotnitz, who eventually went on to become one of the series' executive producers. "End Game" earned a Nielsen household rating of 11.2, being watched by 10.7 million households in its initial broadcast. It received positive reviews from critics.

== Plot ==
USS Allegiance, an American nuclear submarine, is patrolling the Beaufort Sea off the coast of Alaska when it comes across a craft below the ice that is emitting a radio signal. Allegiance is ordered to fire upon the craft by Pacific Command. However, the craft manages to disable the sub using a high-pitched frequency, stranding it below the ice.

Continuing from the cliffhanger ending of "Colony", Dana Scully (Gillian Anderson) is beaten and kidnapped by "Mulder", who is really the Alien Bounty Hunter in disguise. When the real Mulder (David Duchovny) finds the wrecked hotel room, his sister Samantha explains that the Bounty Hunter will set up a hostage exchange to swap Scully for her. She further explains that the Bounty Hunter can only be killed by piercing the base of his neck and that his alien blood is deadly to humans. Finally, Samantha reveals that the clones are the progeny of two original aliens and worked at abortion clinics to gain access to fetal tissue. Their objective was to set up an extraterrestrial colony on Earth, an effort that has gone as far back as the 1940s. Because the clones' experiments were considered to have tainted their alien race, the Bounty Hunter was sent to kill them.

Walter Skinner meets Mulder and Samantha at Mulder's apartment, telling them that the remaining clones are missing. Mulder receives a call from Scully, who tells him that the Bounty Hunter seeks an exchange for Samantha. Mulder and Samantha are sent to a bridge near Bethesda while Skinner hides nearby with a sharpshooter. After the exchange takes place, Samantha attacks the Bounty Hunter. During the struggle, the sharpshooter fires upon the Bounty Hunter, and both he and Samantha fall into a river. An anguished Mulder tearfully apologizes to his father, Bill, for losing her again. Bill leaves Mulder a note from Samantha, which provides him with the address of a Maryland clinic where they can meet if separated. Mulder hopes that she is alive, but soon gets a call from Scully reporting that Samantha's body has been found. After Scully ends the call, she discovers Samantha's body dissolving into a green liquid.

Meanwhile, inside the clinic, Mulder finds multiple clones of Samantha working on fetuses in labs similar to that of the clones. They reveal that they manipulated Mulder by sending one of their own to pose as "Samantha" in an effort to have him protect her original clone. They claim to know the real Samantha's location. Mulder, realizing he has been duped, initially refuses to help and starts to leave, but is knocked unconscious by the Bounty Hunter, who proceeds to kill the Samantha clones and burn down the clinic. When no trace of the clones is found, Mulder meets with X at the Kennedy Center, demanding to know the Bounty Hunter's location. X says that the Bounty Hunter's craft below the Beaufort Sea has been found, and that a naval fleet has been sent to destroy it. Mulder heads there and e-mails Scully to tell her not to follow him.

Scully goes to Skinner for help, but he initially refuses. She summons X to Mulder's apartment, but he turns her down. On his way out, X is confronted by Skinner in an elevator. After the two men engage in a vicious physical altercation, X divulges Mulder's whereabouts. Meanwhile, Mulder finds the stranded Allegiance, with its sail broken through a patch of shallow Arctic ice. Inside, he finds what seems to be the sub's only surviving crewman, whom Mulder realizes is the disguised Bounty Hunter. The two struggle, during which Mulder becomes exposed to the Bounty Hunter's toxic blood. The Bounty Hunter claims that Samantha is still alive before dumping Mulder off the sail and submerging Allegiance; a weak Mulder is nearly cut in half with the sub's diving plane in the process. He is discovered and rushed to the field hospital seen at the beginning of "Colony", where Scully—having learned that the alien blood contains a retrovirus that dies in cold temperatures—convinces the doctors to take him out of the bath that would warm up his body.

As Mulder's condition stabilizes, Scully writes a field report crediting science with detecting the retrovirus and saving Mulder. She contends that the retrovirus is of a mysterious origin, and reports that neither the Bounty Hunter nor Allegiance have been found. When Mulder regains consciousness, he tells Scully that his experiences did not give him the answers he had been searching for, but that they have given him renewed "faith to keep looking".

== Production ==
=== Writing ===
This was the first episode of the series written by Frank Spotnitz. Spotnitz, who came up with the idea to bring back Samantha Mulder in "Colony", wrote this episode, his first credited work on the show. According to Spotnitz, he along with Chris Carter, were overly ambitious when writing this episode. Since this was Spotnitz's debut as a television writer, he got significant help from Carter to put the script together. All of the scenes originally pitched by Spotnitz were kept, except for a car chase scene that ended with a crash, and one where Mulder mistakes a federal marshal for the bounty hunter. The scenes were cut due to time restraints during filming. Spotnitz later became a frequent collaborator on many of the subsequent mythology episodes of the show, as well as co-writing the two feature films.

It turned out in this episode that the Samantha Mulder (Megan Leitch) who appeared was a clone. Carter did not want it to be the real Samantha, since that would have been "straight science fiction" and it was too "ridiculous" to give too many answers. Spotnitz further explained that the production crew never saw The X-Files as a "science fiction show", but more of a show that incorporated science fiction, and that this and previous episode "Colony" were more of a "suspense thriller" than any other genre. Chris Carter described the "Colony" and "End Game" two-parter as the "backbone of the show, the romantic quest of Mulder for the truth and Scully as well", and that it led Scully to believe in the conspiracy.

=== Filming ===
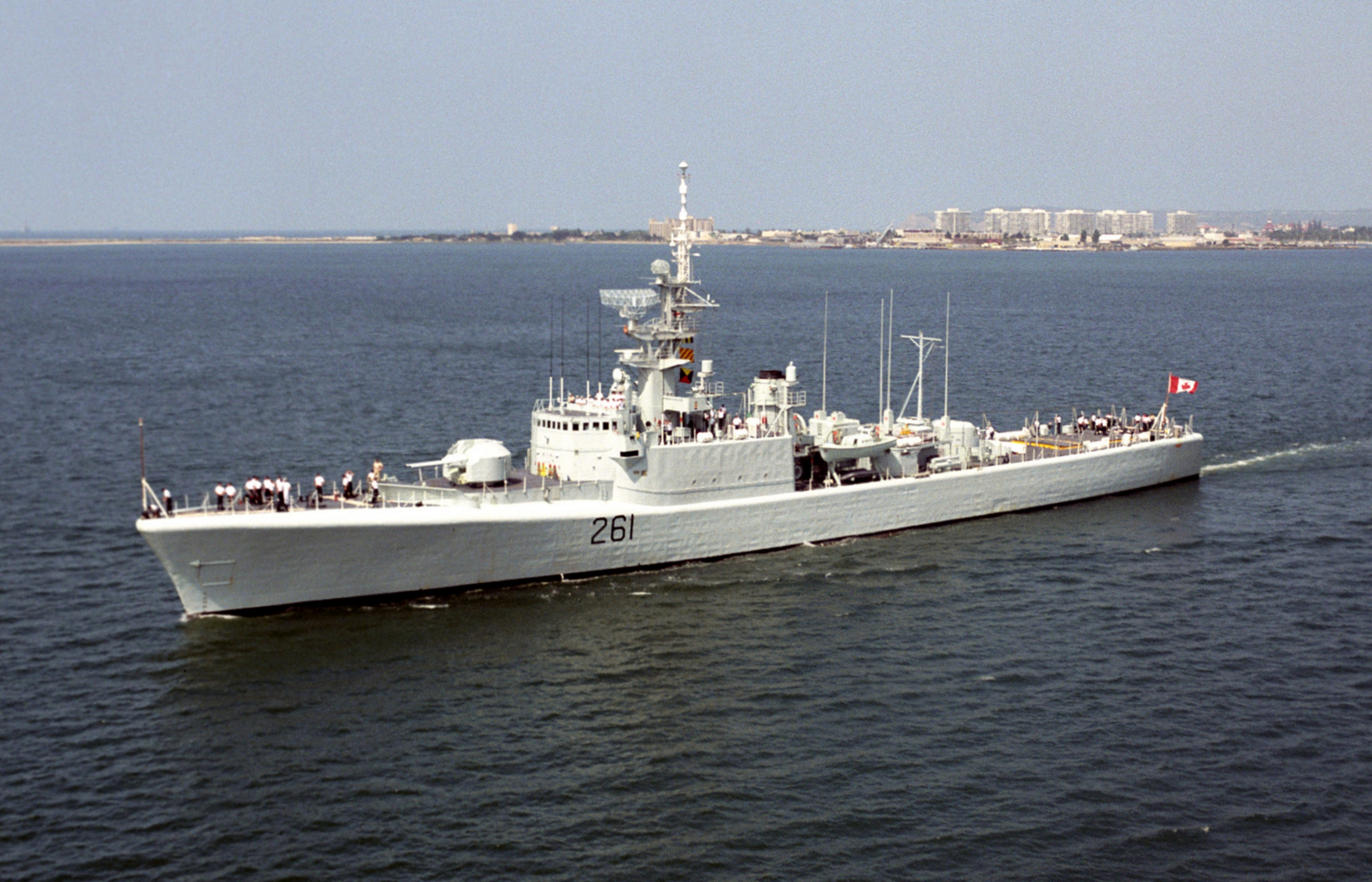
Interior shots were filmed aboard HMCS Mackenzie.

The motel scene with the bounty hunter and Dana Scully was shot on a sound stage in Vancouver, British Columbia, Canada in a simple motel room set. The scene featuring Scully being beaten up by the bounty hunter was primarily performed by a stunt woman. The stiletto weapon, often referred to as the "gimlet", used by the bounty hunter was constructed from aluminium and acrylic, and activated by a pneumatic hose hidden in actor Brian Thompson's sleeve. The grunt Scully utters when thrown through a table was insisted on by Standards and Practices, giving the reasoning that the show needed to make it clear for the viewers that she was not dead. According to executive producer Frank Spotnitz it was an "arcane, bizarre logic that you have to deal with when you're putting a show on network television." As director Rob Bowman was dissatisfied with the first take of Skinner shoving X against the elevator wall, Mitch Pileggi and Steven Williams decided to do the stunt for real, and Pileggi did it with so much strength that it broke the back of the elevator scenery. Williams' background in fight choreography, stemming from his role in Missing in Action 2: The Beginning, allowed him to help in choreographing the brawl.

One hundred and forty tons of snow and ice were trucked into a soundstage to create the scene with the submarine towards the end of the episode, and the stage had to be refrigerated for five days. The control tower scenery was able to rise or lower only five feet, leading to restrictions such as filming on black backdrops. A decommissioned destroyer, HMCS Mackenzie was rented from the Royal Canadian Navy and used for the submarine interior. It was reused two episodes later for interior shots in "Død Kalm".

== Reception ==
...the sad paradox of Mulder's quest is that you can't want to believe and trust no one. ... In the end, despite near death, despite all the set-backs, he still has the faith to go on searching. He believes, he'll follow any lie no matter how outlandish, because maybe, just maybe, he might find that final thread that will give his life meaning. And we watch, hoping the same might be true for ourselves.

— The A.V. Club's Zack Handlen on Mulder's quest for the truth.

"End Game" premiered on the Fox network on February 17, 1995. The episode earned a Nielsen household rating of 11.2 with a 19 share, meaning that roughly 11.2 percent of all television-equipped households, and 19 percent of households watching television, were tuned in to the episode. A total of 10.7 million households watched this episode during its original airing.

The episode has been met with positive reviews from critics. In a retrospective of the second season in Entertainment Weekly, the episode was rated an A−, being called "an exhausting, essential chapter, boasting the series' most visually stunning finale". Writing for The A.V. Club, Zack Handlen rated the episode an A, noting that it was "X-Files in top form". He felt that the fight between Skinner and X was "one of the season's great moments", although he derided the use of Scully in a "heroine-as-victim" role. Michelle Bush, in her book Myth-X, has noted that "End Game" is "a good example of the basic premises that Mulder and Scully cannot succeed without the other", and serves to highlight "the danger of making someone else's choice for them."

== Bibliography ==
- Bush, Michelle (2008). Myth-X. Lulu. ISBN 978-1-4357-4688-6.
- Edwards, Ted (1996). X-Files Confidential. Little, Brown and Company. ISBN 0-316-21808-1.
- Lovece, Frank (1996). The X-Files Declassified. Citadel Press. ISBN 0-8065-1745-X.
- Lowry, Brian (1995). The Truth is Out There: The Official Guide to the X-Files. Harper Prism. ISBN 0-06-105330-9.
