= HMCS Qu'Appelle =

HMCS Qu'Appelle can refer to several different things named after the Qu'Appelle River in Saskatchewan:

- HMCS Qu'Appelle (H69) (I), a River-class destroyer that served in the Royal Canadian Navy during the Second World War, commissioned February 1944 until May 1946.
- HMCS Qu'Appelle (DDE 264) (II), a Mackenzie-class destroyer escort that served in the RCN and the Canadian Forces during the Cold War, commissioned February 1963.
- CSTC HMCS Qu'Appelle (III), a Cadet Summer Training Centre operated by the Royal Canadian Sea Cadets from 1993 to 2004.

== Battle honours ==
- Atlantic, 1944.
- Normandy, 1944.
- Biscay, 1944.
