= Colony (The X-Files) =

- The X-Files episode
- Clones from the Gregor series
- Episode no.: Season 2 Episode 16
- Directed by: Nick Marck
- Story by: David Duchovny; Chris Carter
- Teleplay by: Chris Carter
- Production code: 2X16
- Original air date: February 10, 1995
- Running time: 44 minutes

Guest appearances
- Peter Donat as William Mulder; Brian Thompson as the Alien Bounty Hunter; Dana Gladstone as Dr. Landon Prince/Gregor Clones; Megan Leitch as Samantha Mulder; Tom Butler as CIA Agent Ambrose Chapel; Rebecca Toolan as Teena Mulder; Mitch Pileggi as Walter Skinner

Episode chronology
← Previous "Fresh Bones"	Next → "End Game"
- The X-Files season 2

"Colony" is the sixteenth episode of the second season of the American science fiction television series The X-Files. It premiered on the Fox network on February 10, 1995. It was directed by Nick Marck, and written by series creator Chris Carter based on a story developed by Carter and lead actor David Duchovny. "Colony" featured guest appearances by Megan Leitch, Peter Donat and Brian Thompson. The episode helped explore the series' overarching mythology. "Colony" earned a Nielsen household rating of 10.3, being watched by 9.8 million households in its initial broadcast. "Colony" is a two-part episode, with the plot continuing in the next episode, "End Game".

The show centers on FBI special agents Fox Mulder (Duchovny) and Dana Scully (Gillian Anderson) who work on cases linked to the paranormal, called X-Files. In this episode, Mulder and Scully investigate the murders of human clones working in abortion clinics at the hands of a shapeshifting assassin (Thompson). Mulder receives news that his younger sister Samantha (Leitch), who had been abducted as a child, may have returned.

"Colony" introduced the recurring role of the Alien Bounty Hunter. Actor Brian Thompson auditioned and later won the role. Frank Spotnitz and Carter did not have much time to cast this character, but they knew this casting would be important since he was intended to be a recurring character. Thompson was chosen according to Spotnitz because he had a very "distinctive look" about him, most notably his face and mouth.

== Plot ==
The episode opens in medias res with Fox Mulder in a field hospital in the Arctic. As Mulder is lowered into a tub of water, Dana Scully bursts in and tells the doctors that the cold is the only thing keeping him alive. Suddenly, Mulder's heart monitor flatlines.

Two weeks earlier, in the Beaufort Sea, crewmen on a ship spot a light in the sky that soon crashes into the water. A body is retrieved from the crash, revealed to be an Alien Bounty Hunter. Two days later, the Bounty Hunter arrives at an abortion clinic in Scranton, Pennsylvania, and kills a doctor by stabbing him in the back of the neck with a stiletto weapon, then sets the building on fire and escapes. Mulder receives emails containing the doctor's obituary along with two other identical doctors. After interviewing a pro-life priest who had threatened one of the doctors, they go to a newspaper office in Binghamton, New York, and use a classified ad looking for one of the men to track another one, Aaron Baker, to Syracuse.

Mulder has a fellow FBI agent, Barrett Weiss, visit Baker's residence. Weiss and Baker are both killed by the Bounty Hunter, who impersonates Weiss and tells Mulder and Scully that no one is home. After Walter Skinner hears of Weiss' death and closes the case, the agents meet CIA official Ambrose Chapel, who tells them that the doctors are clones from a Soviet genetics program and are being systematically killed by both the Russian and U.S. governments. Mulder, Scully and Chapel head to pick up another doctor named James Dickens, but Dickens flees at the sight of Chapel, who is really the disguised Bounty Hunter. Dickens is killed by the Bounty Hunter in the subsequent pursuit, unknowingly aided by Mulder and Scully.

Scully doubts "Chapel's" credibility, but Mulder believes his story due to his credentials and experience. Scully performs an autopsy on Weiss and finds that his blood has coagulated, while his red blood cell count is excessively high. Scully finds an address on a bag recovered from Dickens' residence and heads there, discovering a lab that is in the process of being destroyed by "Chapel." Meanwhile, Mulder is summoned to the home of his father, Bill, and learns that his sister Samantha has seemingly returned home after being abducted decades before. Samantha claims that she was returned around age nine with no memory, and recently recalled her experience through hypnosis.

Samantha tells Mulder that the Bounty Hunter and the clones are actually aliens, and the Bounty Hunter will begin chasing her as soon as he has killed the remaining clones. Meanwhile, Scully heads to a hotel to hide from the Bounty Hunter. Returning to the lab, she finds four more clones, who claim to be the last. Scully arranges for them to be transported to a safe place, but the Bounty Hunter follows her and watches. The four clones are taken to a federal stockade, where they are killed by the Bounty Hunter, disguised as a prison official. At her hotel room, Scully lets in a man who seems to be Mulder, only to receive a phone call from the actual Mulder soon after.

== Production ==
=== Casting ===
As in all other episodes of The X-Files at that point, the casting process took eight days. Megan Leitch, the woman who portrayed Samantha Mulder, did according to Frank Spotnitz a "phenomenal job". Leitch returned to The X-Files over the years to portray Samantha or one of her many clones. She had a lot of lines, which she felt were "very hard" and "specific." Actor Darren McGavin, star of Kolchak: The Night Stalker, was originally sought to play the role of Bill Mulder, but was unable due to his work schedule. The role was ultimately played by Peter Donat.

Brian Thompson auditioned for the role of the bounty hunter in a casting session, where he was competing with another actor. Frank Spotnitz and Carter did not have much time to cast this character, but they knew this casting would be important since he intended to be a recurring character. Thompson was chosen according to Spotnitz because he had a very "distinctive look" about him, most notably his face and mouth. After casting him, they told Thompson's agent that Thompson needed a hair cut, because at the start the Alien Bounty Hunter was supposed to be a kind of military pilot who'd been shot down. But when the day came that Thompson came to Vancouver, there had been some "misunderstanding" and he hadn't been told of the "crewcut", so the hairstyle seen in this episode was a "compromise" of sorts.

=== Writing and filming ===
Carter said that while "Colony" was a "crystallization of the series' mythology", it "came about inadvertently", following David Duchovny's suggestion to face an alien bounty hunter. Thus he sat with the actor and decided to also add Mulder's disappeared sister. The episode marked David Duchovny's first credited story contribution to the series. The alien weapon, described by the cast and crew as "the ice pick", was done with an air hose that ran through Brian Thompson's arm. To create a unique and otherworldly sound made by the weapon used by the hunter, several sound effects were considered before co-producer Paul Rabwin voiced the noise himself on a microphone.

Carter had initially wanted to set the first season episode "Ice" at the North Pole, but this was too ambitious at the time. "Colony" provided an opportunity to create an episode using such a setting. Some of the interior shots on the icebreaker were filmed aboard HMCS Mackenzie, a decommissioned Canadian Armed Forces destroyer, which was also used in the episode's follow-up, "End Game", and the later second season episode "Død Kalm".

== Reception ==
"Colony" premiered on the Fox network on February 10, 1995. The episode earned a Nielsen household rating of 10.3 with a 17 share, meaning that roughly 10.3 percent of all television-equipped households, and 17 percent of households watching TV, were tuned in to the episode. A total of 9.8 million households watched this episode during its original airing.

In a retrospective of the second season in Entertainment Weekly, the episode was rated a B+. The review stated that "untangling this web of shifting allegiances and identities requires intense concentration. Hang on, though; the payoff's worth it". Writing for The A.V. Club, Zack Handlen rated the episode an A, noting that it was "X-Files in top form". He praised how the character of Samantha Mulder was presented, saying that "In the seasons to come, we end up with enough Samantha's [sic] to fill a clown-car, but here, the reveal is shocking, effective, and unsettling"; and also felt that the episode's flashforward cold open was particularly well-handled. Michelle Bush, in her book Myth-X, wrote that "Colony" presents a moral dilemma for the characters, noting that "on the surface Mulder's quest appears righteous, however, the results of his quest would suggest otherwise", and adding "generally the ideology that focuses on a single life's (be that human or alien) importance is successful, whereas Mulder's ideology of finding the truth at all costs is not". Duchovny's portrayal of Fox Mulder in this episode has been cited as an example of the character's reversal of traditional gender roles—his openness and vulnerability when confronted with what he believes is his prodigal sister casts him "in a pattern typically engendered as female."

== Bibliography ==
- Bush, Michelle (2008). Myth-X. Lulu. ISBN 978-1-4357-4688-6.
- Edwards, Ted (1996). X-Files Confidential. Little, Brown and Company. ISBN 0-316-21808-1.
- Lavery, David; Hague, Angela; Cartwright, Marla (1996). Deny All Knowledge: Reading The X-Files. Syracuse University Press. ISBN 0-8156-2717-3.
- Lovece, Frank (1996). The X-Files Declassified. Citadel Press. ISBN 0-8065-1745-X.
- Lowry, Brian (1995). The Truth is Out There: The Official Guide to the X-Files. Harper Prism. ISBN 0-06-105330-9.
