= HMCS Mackenzie =

Several Canadian naval units have been named HMCS Mackenzie.

- HMCS Mackenzie (DDE 261) (I) was the lead ship of her class of destroyer, serving in the Royal Canadian Navy and Maritime Command between 1962 and 1993
- HMCS Mackenzie (II) is a planned River-class destroyers, intended to enter service in the 2030s.
