= HMCS Qu'Appelle (DDE 264) =

Destroyer of the Royal Canadian Navy

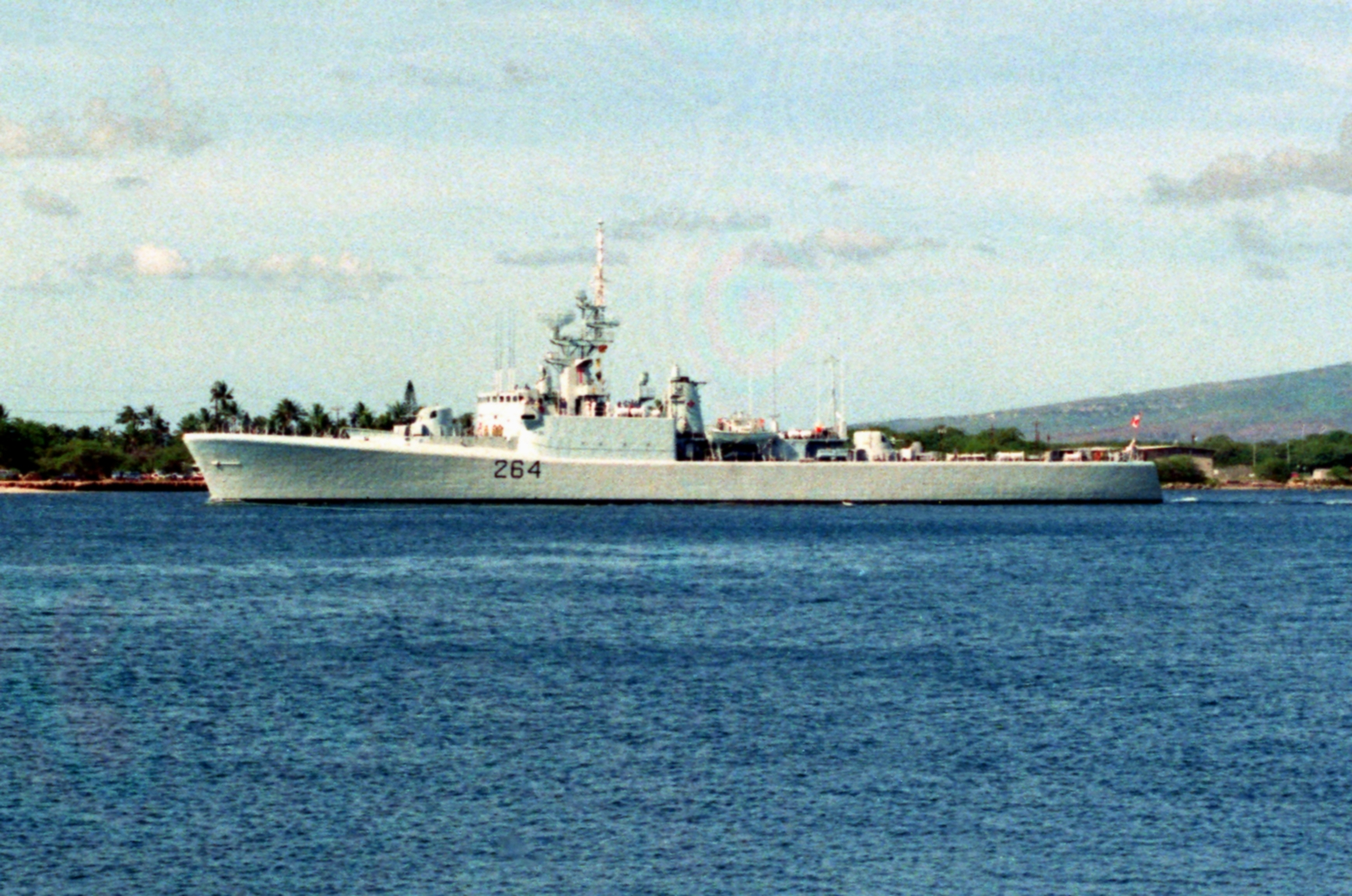
- HMCS Qu'Appelle (DDE 264) at Pearl Harbor, in 1990

History

Canada
- Name: Qu'Appelle
- Namesake: Qu'Appelle River
- Ordered: 1957
- Builder: Davie Shipbuilding, Lauzon
- Laid down: 14 January 1960
- Launched: 2 May 1962
- Commissioned: 14 September 1963
- Decommissioned: 31 July 1992
- Refit: 1982 (DELEX)
- Honours and awards: Atlantic 1944, Normandy 1944, Biscay 1944
- Fate: Sold for scrapping in 1994
- Badge: Azure, a bend wavy argent charged with a like bendlet gules, and over all a fox's mask argent

General characteristics
- Class & type: Mackenzie-class destroyer
- Displacement: 2,880 t (2,830 long tons) full load
- Length: 366 ft (111.6 m)
- Beam: 42 ft (12.8 m)
- Draught: 14 ft (4.3 m)
- Installed power: 2 × Babcock & Wilcox boilers; 30,000 shp (22,000 kW)
- Propulsion: 2 shafts; 2 × English-Electric geared steam turbines
- Speed: 28 kn (51.9 km/h; 32.2 mph)
- Complement: 228 regular, 170–210 training
- Sensors & processing systems: 1 × SPS-12 air search radar; 1 × SPS-10B surface search radar; 1 × Sperry Mk.2 navigation radar; 1 × SQS-501 high frequency bottom profiler sonar; 1 × SQS-502 high frequency mortar control sonar; 1 × SQS-503 hull mounted active search sonar; 1 × SQS-11 hull mounted active search sonar
- Electronic warfare & decoys: 1 × DAU (replaced by SRD 501) high frequency direction finder; 1 × WLR 1C radar analyzer; 1 × UPD 501 radar detector
- Armament: 1 × 3-inch/50 Mk.6 Vickers twin mount forward; 1 × 3-inch/50 Mk.33 FMC twin mount aft; 2 × Mk NC 10 Limbo ASW mortars; 2 × single Mk.2 "K-gun" launchers with homing torpedoes; 1 × 103 mm Bofors illumination rocket launcher

HMCS Qu'Appelle was a Mackenzie-class destroyer that served in the Royal Canadian Navy and later the Canadian Forces. The ship's insignia and logo was the head of a fox facing forward centered in a diagonal line double white with a red center sqiggley line from the top left to bottom right. The moniker of the ship was "Follow the Fox".

She is the second Canadian naval unit to carry the name HMCS Qu'Appelle. Qu'Appelle was named for the Qu'Appelle River which runs through Saskatchewan and Manitoba in Canada. Entering service in 1963, the ship was largely used as a training ship on the west coast. She was decommissioned in 1994 and sold for scrapping.

== Design ==
The Mackenzie class was an offshoot of the St. Laurent-class design. Initially planned to be an improved version of the design, budget difficulties led to the Canadian government ordering a repeat of the previous Restigouche class, with improved habitability and better pre-wetting, bridge and weatherdeck fittings to better deal with extreme cold. The original intention was to give the Mackenzie class variable depth sonar during construction, but would have led to delays of up to a year in construction time, which the navy could not accept.

=== General characteristics ===
The Mackenzie-class vessels measured 366 feet (112 m) in length, with a beam of 42 feet (13 m) and a draught of 13 feet 6 inches (4.11 m). The Mackenzies displaced 2,880 tonnes (2,830 long tons) fully loaded and had a complement of 290. (Note: Macpherson and Barrie state the complement as 245 (12 officers and 233 enlisted))

The class was powered by two Babcock & Wilcox boilers connected to the two-shaft English-Electric geared steam turbines creating 30,000 shaft horsepower (22,000 kW). This gave the ships a maximum speed of 28 knots (52 km/h; 32 mph).

=== Armament ===
The most noticeable change for the Mackenzies was the replacement of the forward 3-inch (76 mm)/50 caliber Mk 22 guns of the St. Laurent design (Note: Caliber denotes the length of the barrel. In this case, 50 caliber means that the gun barrel is 50 times as long as it is in diameter) with a dual Vickers 3-inch/70 caliber Mk 6 gun mount and the presence of a fire-control director atop the bridge superstructure. However, the 3-inch/70 caliber guns were unavailable when Qu'Appelle was being constructed and 3-inch/50 caliber guns were installed instead in the forward mount. The entire class did retain the rear dual 3-inch/50 caliber gun mount and for anti-submarine warfare, the class was provided with two Mk 10 Limbo mortars. The ships were initially fitted with Mark 43 torpedoes to supplement their anti-submarine capability, but were quickly upgraded to the Mark 44 launched from a modified depth charge thrower. This was to give the destroyers the ability to combat submarines from a distance.

=== Sensors ===
The Mackenzie class were equipped with one SPS-12 air search radar, one SPS-10B surface search radar and one Sperry Mk.2 navigation radar. For detection below the surface, the ships had one SQS-501 high frequency bottom profiler sonar, one SQS-503 hull mounted active search sonar, one SQS-502 high frequency mortar control sonar and one SQS-11 hull mounted active search sonar.

=== DELEX refit ===
The DEstroyer Life EXtension (DELEX) refit was born out of the need to extend the life of the steam-powered destroyer escorts of the Canadian Navy in the 1980s until the next generation of surface ship was built. Encompassing all the classes based on the initial St. Laurent (the remaining St. Laurent, Restigouche, Mackenzie, and Annapolis-class vessels), the DELEX upgrades were meant to improve their ability to combat modern Soviet submarines, and to allow them to continue to operate as part of NATO task forces.

The DELEX refit for the Mackenzie class was the same for the Improved Restigouche-class vessels. This meant that the ships would receive the new tactical data system ADLIPS, new radars, new fire control and satellite navigation. They exchanged the SQS-503 sonar for the newer SQS-505 model.

They also received a triple mount for 12.75-inch (324 mm) torpedo tubes that would use the new Mk 46 homing torpedo. The Mark 46 torpedo had a range of 12,000 yards (11,000 m) at over 40 knots (74 km/h; 46 mph) with a high-explosive warhead weighing 96.8 pounds (43.9 kg).

== Construction and career ==
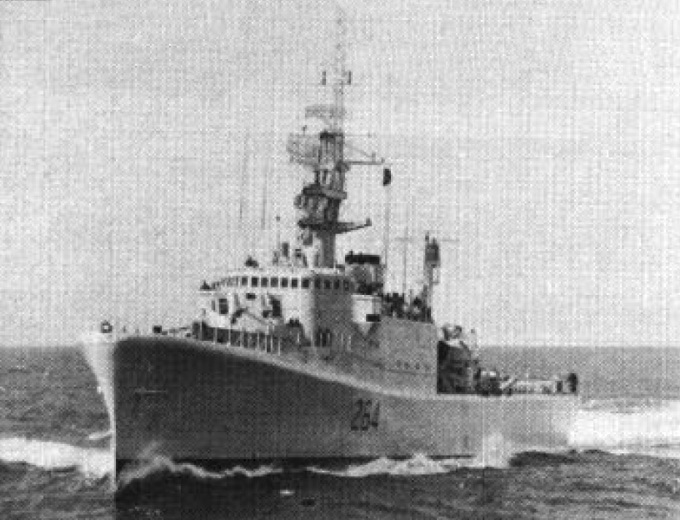
Qu'Appelle underway in 1972

Qu'Appelle was ordered in 1957 and laid down on 14 January 1960 at Davie Shipbuilding Ltd., Lauzon. The ship was launched on 2 May 1962 and was commissioned into the RCN on 14 September 1963 with the classification number DDE 264.

Qu'Appelle was assigned to the Pacific Fleet in 1964 and served largely as a training ship with the RCN and later in the CF under Maritime Forces Pacific. In 1971, the destroyer, along with the replenishment ship Provider and the submarine Rainbow shadowed a seven-ship Soviet fleet in the Aleutian Islands. On 28 August 1972, Qu'Appelle accompanied Provider and the destroyer Gatineau on a four-month training cruise around the Pacific.

Qu'Appelle underwent the DELEX refit in from 25 May 1983 to 13 January 1984 at the Burrard Yarrow shipyard at CFB Esquimalt. In 1986, the ship was among those sent to participate in the ceremonies surrounding the Royal Australian Navy's 75th anniversary. Afterwards, the ship was a member of Training Group Pacific until her decommissioning.

The ship was paid off from Maritime Command on 31 July 1992. Ex-Qu'Appelle was sold to a Chinese firm for scrapping in 1994. The ship's bell is currently held by the CFB Esquimalt Naval & Military Museum, in Esquimalt, British Columbia. One of Qu'Appelle's 3-inch/50 caliber guns is held by the Canadian War Museum in Ottawa, Ontario.
