= Snake Island (Nanaimo) =

Island in British Columbia, Canada

Coordinates: 49.2152°N 123.8906°W

Snake Island is a small, uninhabited, rocky island northeast of Nanaimo. It is a minor member of the large group of islands east of southern Vancouver Island called the Gulf Islands. It is a bird sanctuary to nesting bird breeds of Glaucous-winged Gulls and Pelagic Cormorants. The island is a frequent destination for local wildlife tours, and the rocky shores and reefs around the island are popular with divers. It is also home to a colony of harbour seals who have become accustomed to divers in the water, and will interact with them. The Island may get its name from the image of a snake’s head that appears in the coastal rocks at low tide.

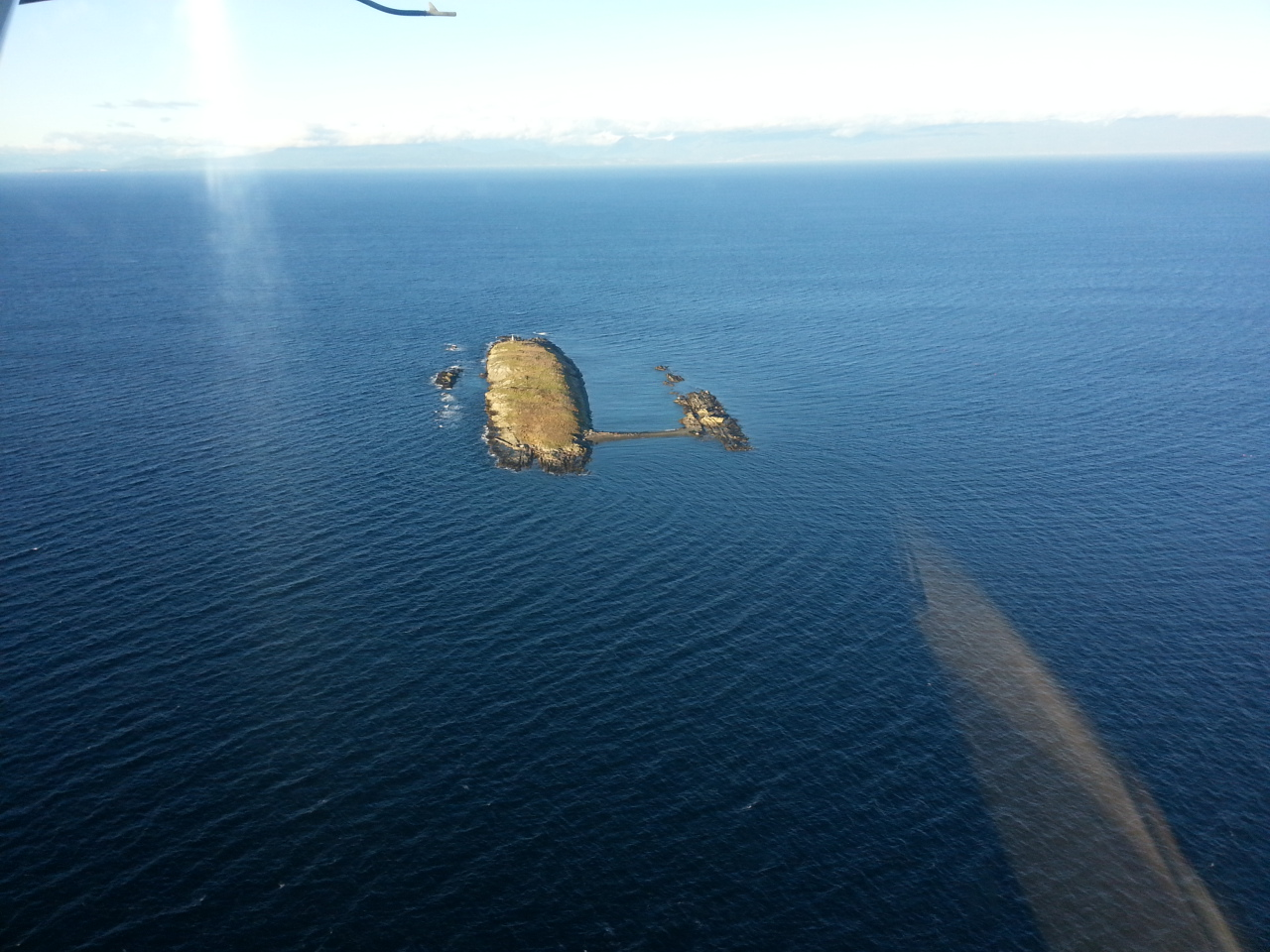
The island from the air

Snake Island is near the site of the artificial reef created by the sinking of HMCS Cape Breton, a Second World War Victory ship. The vessel was acquired and prepared by the Artificial Reef Society of British Columbia.
