= Fearful Symmetry (The X-Files) =

- The X-Files episode
- Episode no.: Season 2 Episode 18
- Directed by: James Whitmore Jr.
- Written by: Steve De Jarnatt
- Production code: 2X18
- Original air date: February 24, 1995
- Running time: 44 minutes

Guest appearances
- Jayne Atkinson as Willa Ambrose; Lance Guest as Kyle Lang; Jack Rader as Ed Meecham; Bruce Harwood as John Fitzgerald Byers; Tom Braidwood as Melvin Frohike

Episode chronology
← Previous "End Game"	Next → "Død Kalm"
- The X-Files season 2

"Fearful Symmetry" is the eighteenth episode of the second season of the American science fiction television series The X-Files. It premiered on the Fox network on February 24, 1995. It was written by Steve De Jarnatt and directed by James Whitmore Jr. The episode is a "Monster-of-the-Week" story, only loosely connected to the series' wider mythology. "Fearful Symmetry" received a Nielsen rating of 10.1 and was watched by 9.6 million households. The episode received mixed reviews from critics but later won an EMA Award.

The show centers on FBI special agents Fox Mulder (David Duchovny) and Dana Scully (Gillian Anderson) who work on cases linked to the paranormal, called X-Files. Mulder is a believer in the paranormal, while the skeptical Scully has been assigned to debunk his work. In this episode, Mulder and Scully investigate the death of a federal construction worker and the destruction of various property that can only be tied to an escaped elephant. Unfortunately, the only witnesses claim to have seen no animals which might have caused the turmoil. Soon, Mulder and Scully discover the local zoo, which is noted to have never had a successful animal birth.

"Fearful Symmetry" takes its title from a line in the William Blake poem "The Tyger". Due to strict animal cruelty laws in British Columbia, filming the episode was a challenge: To include a live elephant, the show's producers had to secure special permits and film in South Surrey, where restrictions were less stringent. Additionally, the crew struggled to keep a live tiger calm and warm in Vancouver's climate.

== Plot ==
In Fairfield, Idaho, two janitors witness an invisible force storm down a city street; a road worker is later killed by the force on the highway. The next day, an elephant suddenly materializes in front of an oncoming big rig. The driver manages to stop in time, but the elephant soon collapses and dies, over forty miles away from where it disappeared the night before at the Fairfield Zoo.

Fox Mulder (David Duchovny) and Dana Scully (Gillian Anderson) survey the damage in the city, which appears to have been caused by an elephant even though none was seen. Ed Meecham, an animal handler at the zoo, recounts how he came to the elephant's locked cage to find it empty. His boss, Willa Ambrose, tells the agents that the zoo is in danger of closing due to other animal disappearances. She blames the zoo's decline on an animal rights group which is known to free captive animals. The group's leader, Kyle Lang, denies any involvement in the elephant's release. Lang tells them that Ambrose is being sued by the Malawi government over a lowland gorilla she took from their country ten years prior.

Mulder contacts Frohike and Byers, who say that Fairfield is known for its animal disappearances and UFO sightings. They also mention Ambrose's gorilla, who is known to communicate using American Sign Language. Meanwhile, Scully follows one of Lang's activists as he sneaks into the zoo, running into Meecham inside. The activist attempts to free a tiger, but after a flash of light, the tiger seemingly disappears. The activist is promptly mauled to death, with the killing captured on his night vision camera. When questioned, Lang denies any responsibility for the death. Ambrose introduces the agents to the gorilla, Sophie, who has been cowering in her cage and expresses an apparent fear of light.

Scully performs a necropsy on the elephant, revealing it to be pregnant — which is impossible, since the animal had never been mated. The tiger reappears at a Boise construction site, and is shot dead by Meecham when it charges at Ambrose; the zoo is shut down the next day over the incident. Mulder tells Ambrose that the tiger was also pregnant, and explains his theory that extraterrestrial aliens are impregnating all the female endangered animals as part of "their own Noah's Ark." Mulder thinks that Sophie too is pregnant and that she is worried that her baby will be abducted. Sophie confirms Mulder's suspicions when she makes signs for "baby go flying light".

Sheriff's deputies order Ambrose to release Sophie into protective custody, presumably to be sent back to Malawi. Ambrose unsuccessfully seeks help from Lang, her former boyfriend, but he advises to let Sophie return to the wild. Lang later goes to see Ambrose at the warehouse where Sophie is being prepped for shipping, but finds her cage empty. He is then mysteriously killed by a falling crate. Scully finds that Lang was struck with a cattle prod and suspects Ambrose of killing him, but she claims that Meecham is responsible. Mulder goes to arrest Meecham, who is keeping an angered Sophie at another warehouse near Boise. Meecham suddenly locks Mulder in Sophie's room, where the enraged gorilla attacks and injures him.

A bright light appears and causes Sophie to vanish, but not before she gives Mulder a final message in sign language. When Mulder gives the message to Ambrose the next day, she says it means "man save man." Ambrose and the agents are then called to the highway, where Sophie has been struck by a car and killed. Ambrose and Meecham are both charged with manslaughter for Lang's death. As the agents leave Idaho, Mulder says through narration that he believes alien conservationists were behind the events in Fairfield.

== Production ==
"Fearful Symmetry" was written by Steve De Jarnatt and directed by James Whitmore Jr. Co-Producer J. P. Finn later revealed that the trickiest part of the episode was securing the use of an elephant, as this necessitated the show securing a permit for the animal to pass into Vancouver. The producers hit another roadblock when it came to animal cruelty laws, several of which had been passed in British Columbia that prohibited the "use or appearance" of large animals, like elephants, to protect them from being exploited by unscrupulous circuses. In order to circumvent these rules, scenes filmed with Bubbles were shot "on a quiet country road" in South Surrey, where these laws were not in effect. Finn later revealed that the elephant used for the episode, named "Bubbles", was "fantastic to work with". The producers were initially worried that the elephant would be scared of large vehicles and would thus not run towards a truck—a necessary shot for the episode's opening. However, the producers ended up having difficulty getting the creature away from truck, as it enjoyed running near it. In the episode, the elephant is named "Ganesha" after the Hindu God of the same name. A live tiger was also used in the episode, and the production crew struggled with keeping it "calm and warm", given that Vancouver's climate is drastically different from the one in which tigers evolved to thrive. The episode's title comes from a line in the William Blake poem "The Tyger". The fictional construction site where the tiger appears, "Blake Towers", is named after the poet.

== Reception ==
"Fearful Symmetry" was first broadcast in the United States on February 24, 1995, on the Fox network. In its original broadcast, it was watched by 9.6 million households, according to the Nielsen ratings system. It received a 10.1 rating/17 share among viewers meaning that 10.1 percent of all households in the United States, and 17 percent of all people watching television at the time, viewed the episode. The episode later won an EMA Award for its environmental message.

The episode received mostly mixed reviews from critics. Entertainment Weekly gave the episode a C, writing, "Aside from a well-executed invisible-elephant rampage, this one's pretty much on automatic pilot". Zack Handlen of The A.V. Club also graded it as a C, calling it "forgettable, and under-baked; not terrible enough to be a complete failure, but forgettable enough". John Keegan from Critical Myth gave the episode a moderately negative review and awarded it a 4 out of 10. He wrote, "Overall, this episode felt more like a statement by the writer regarding animal rights than an episode of [The X-Files]. The plot doesn’t seem to know which direction it wants to explore, and ultimately, elements of the episode contradict each other." Robert Shearman, in his book Wanting to Believe: A Critical Guide to The X-Files, Millennium & The Lone Gunmen, rated the episode two stars out of five. The critic wrote that, despite the episode having "rare anger" and a "genuine passion behind" its conservation message, the entry was not "a very good story". Shearman further called the plot "so confusing that all that impact [of the teaser] soon dissipates." The plot for "Fearful Symmetry" was also adapted as a novel for young adults in 1996 by Les Martin, under the title Tiger, Tiger.

== Bibliography ==
- Edwards, Ted (1996). X-Files Confidential. Little, Brown and Company. ISBN 0316218081.
- Gradnitzer, Louisa; Pittson, Todd (1999). X Marks the Spot: On Location with The X-Files. Arsenal Pulp Press. ISBN 1-55152-066-4.
- Lovece, Frank (1996). The X-Files Declassified. Citadel Press. ISBN 080651745X.
- Lowry, Brian (1995). The Truth is Out There: The Official Guide to the X-Files. Harper Prism. ISBN 0061053309.
- Lowry, Brian (1996). Trust No One: The Official Guide to the X-Files. Harper Prism. ISBN 0-06-105353-8.
- Martin, Les (1996). Tiger, Tiger. HarperCollins. ISBN 0-06-440626-1.
- Shearman, Robert (2009). Wanting to Believe: A Critical Guide to The X-Files, Millennium & The Lone Gunmen. Mad Norwegian Press. ISBN 978-0975944691.
