= HMCS Cape Scott =

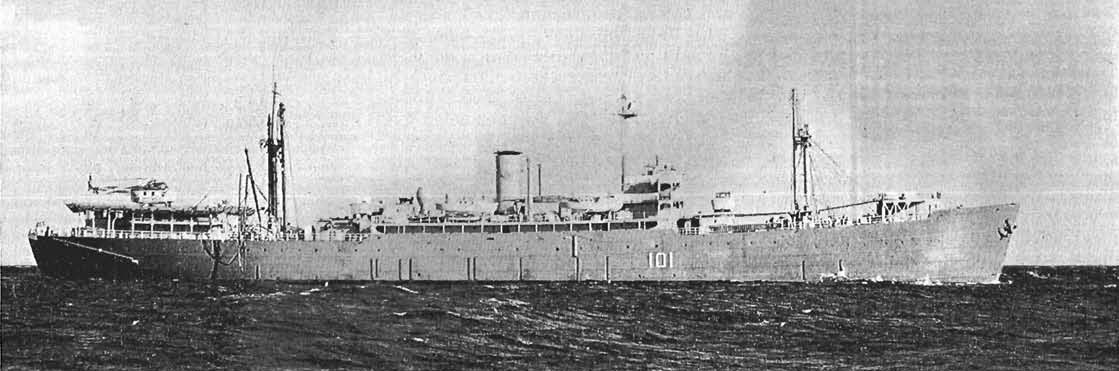
- HMCS Cape Scott in 1964

History

United Kingdom
- Name: Beachy Head
- Namesake: Beachy Head, East Sussex
- Builder: Burrard Dry Dock, North Vancouver
- Laid down: 8 June 1944
- Launched: 27 September 1944
- Commissioned: 20 March 1945
- Decommissioned: 1952
- Fate: Loaned to Netherlands, 1947–1950; Sold to Canada, 1952

Netherlands
- Name: Vulkaan
- Acquired: 1947
- In service: 1947
- Out of service: 1950
- Fate: Returned to UK, 1950

Canada
- Name: Cape Scott
- Namesake: Cape Scott
- Acquired: 1952
- Commissioned: 28 January 1959
- Decommissioned: 1 July 1970
- Out of service: 1975
- Fate: Broken up 1978
- Badge: Argent, a cross azure charged in the center with a thistle or and interlaced with a gear-wheel gules.

General characteristics
- Class & type: Cape-class maintenance ship
- Displacement: 8,580 long tons (8,718 t) standard; 11,250 long tons (11,431 t) fully loaded
- Length: 441 ft 6 in (134.6 m)
- Beam: 57 ft (17.4 m)
- Draught: 20 ft (6.1 m)
- Propulsion: Oil-fired triple expansion steam engines, 2 boilers, 1 shaft, 2,500 hp (1,864 kW)
- Speed: 11 knots (20.4 km/h; 12.7 mph)
- Complement: 270
- Aircraft carried: handling Sikorsky H04-S
- Aviation facilities: helicopter pad

HMCS Cape Scott was a Cape-class maintenance ship. She was built for the Royal Navy as HMS Beachy Head in 1944. She was loaned to the Royal Netherlands Navy in 1947 as HNLMS Vulkaan and returned to the Royal Navy in 1950. She was sold to the Royal Canadian Navy in 1952 and served until 1975, used as an alongside repair depot after decommissioning.

== Design and description ==
The ships of the class had a standard displacement of 8,550 long tons (8,690 t) and 11,270 long tons (11,450 t) fully loaded. They were 441 feet 6 inches (134.6 m) long overall and 425 feet 0 inches (129.5 m) between perpendiculars with a beam of 57 feet (17.4 m) and a draught of 20 feet (6.1 m). The vessels were propelled by one shaft driven by a reciprocating triple expansion steam engine powered by steam from two Foster Wheeler boilers, creating 2,500 indicated horsepower (1,900 kW). This gave the vessels a maximum speed of 11 knots (20.4 km/h; 12.7 mph). The vessels had a complement of 270.

While in British service the vessel was armed with sixteen single-mounted Oerlikon 20 mm cannons. Upon conversion to a mobile repair ship, the vessels were equipped with landing pads for Sikorsky H04S helicopters situated aft. A decompression chamber was installed and shops for multiple trades such as engineering, diesel engine repair, sheet metal welding, coppersmith and electronic repair among others were created within the ship. The vessels were also equipped with an eight-berth hospital, sick bay, X-ray room, medical lab, dental clinic and lab.

== Service history ==
=== Royal Navy and Royal Netherlands Navy ===
The ship was ordered by the Royal Navy during the Second World War as a modified Fort ship design and was laid down on 8 June 1944 by Burrard Dry Dock at their Vancouver shipyard. Beachy Head was launched on 27 September 1944 and was commissioned into the Royal Navy on 20 March 1945. After short service with the Royal Navy, the vessel was loaned to the Royal Netherlands Navy in 1947 for use as a repair ship and renamed Vulkaan. Netherlands returned the ship to the Royal Navy in 1950, where she returned to her old name Beachy Head.

=== Royal Canadian Navy ===
Beachy Head was acquired by the Royal Canadian Navy in 1952 and renamed Cape Scott in 1953. The ship lay alongside in Halifax, Nova Scotia used as classroom ship and providing auxiliary services in the harbour. The ship was sent for a refit at Saint John, New Brunswick and commissioned on 28 January 1959. In January 1960, the ship deployed to Bermuda as headquarters ship for the Canadian warships from Atlantic Command performing naval exercises in the Caribbean Sea during the winter months. During the deployment, Cape Scott transported six Sikorsky H04S and one Bell helicopters to Bermuda. She returned to Halifax in March. In October 1960, Cape Scott took part in the NATO naval exercise Operation Sweep Clear V off Shelburne, Nova Scotia.

In 1964 Cape Scott was engaged in a civilian medical mission to Rapa Nui in the south Pacific Ocean, called the Medical Expedition to Easter Island (METEI). Carrying nearly 40 doctors and technicians and 20 prefabricated shelters, Cape Scott was refitted to increase fuel capacity from 4,441 to 9,000 barrels (706,100 to 1,430,900 L), and enlarge the forward hatch to handle large cargoes.

The ship was homeported at Halifax until paid off into reserve on 1 July 1970. In 1972, the ship was redesignated Fleet Maintenance Group (Atlantic) and remained as such until 1975, when the group was moved ashore. The ship was sold for scrap in 1977 and broken up in Texas in 1978.
