= Død Kalm =

- The X-Files episode
- Mulder is ravaged by unnatural aging.
- Episode no.: Season 2 Episode 19
- Directed by: Rob Bowman
- Story by: Howard Gordon
- Teleplay by: Howard Gordon; Alex Gansa
- Production code: 2X19
- Original air date: March 10, 1995
- Running time: 45 minutes

Guest appearances
- John Savage as Henry Trondheim; David Cubitt as Captain Barclay, US Navy; Vladimir Kulich as Olafsson

Episode chronology
| ← Previous "Fearful Symmetry" | Next → "Humbug" |
- The X-Files season 2

"Død Kalm" is the nineteenth episode of the second season of the American science fiction television series The X-Files. It premiered on the Fox network on March 10, 1995. The story was written by Howard Gordon, the teleplay was written by Gordon and Alex Gansa, and the episode was directed by Rob Bowman. The episode is a "Monster-of-the-Week" story, unconnected to the series' wider mythology. "Død Kalm" earned a Nielsen household rating of 10.7, being watched by 10.2 million households in its initial broadcast. The episode received mostly mixed-to-positive reviews.

The show centers on FBI special agents Fox Mulder (David Duchovny) and Dana Scully (Gillian Anderson) who work on cases linked to the paranormal, called X-Files. In the episode, Mulder and Scully are called in when a boatload of survivors from a U.S. Navy destroyer escort are found. What particularly catches Agent Mulder's attention is that all of these sailors appear to have aged many decades in the course of a few days. Mulder and Scully travel to Norway where they find a civilian fisherman who is willing to take them to the ship's last known position.

"Død Kalm" was written to make use of the show's access to a navy destroyer that had previously featured in "Colony" and "End Game". The episode was originally intended as a way to give the production crew a rest after several demanding episodes had been shot, but the episode became one of the more difficult to film during the second season. The episode's title evokes that of the suspense film Dead Calm (1989) in a Norwegian-inspired form, joining the Norwegian død (dead) with a recognizable but Norwegian-styled respelling of the word "calm".

== Plot ==
In the Norwegian Sea, chaos erupts on board USS Ardent, an American destroyer escort. Due to mysterious and unspecified events, half of Ardent's crew board lifeboats and abandon ship against the captain's orders. Eighteen hours later, they are spotted by a Canadian fishing vessel; however, in that short span of time, the young crew members have undergone rapid aging.

Dana Scully (Gillian Anderson) is asked by Fox Mulder (David Duchovny) to visit the ship's sole surviving crew member, Lt. Harper, who has been quarantined at the Bethesda Naval Hospital. She finds that Harper, despite being in his twenties, has inexplicably aged to the point of being unrecognizable before she is escorted from the room. Mulder explains that Ardent vanished at the 65th parallel, a location with a history of ship disappearances. Mulder believes that a "wrinkle in time" exists there, and that Ardent was the subject of government experimentation related to the Philadelphia Experiment from World War II.

In Norway, Mulder and Scully hire Henry Trondheim (John Savage), a naval trawler captain, to take them to Ardent's last known location. After crashing into the bow of Ardent, Mulder, Scully and Trondheim find signs of advanced corrosion, even though the warship is only a few years old. Below decks, the party finds the mummified remains of several crew members. They also find the wizened commanding officer of Ardent, Captain Barclay, who claims that "time got lost" after his ship encountered a "glowing light" in the ocean. Trondheim's boat is stolen, and his first mate is murdered.

Trondheim is attacked by a Norwegian pirate whaler named Olafsson, who has not aged despite being on the ship for the past two days. Mulder, Scully and Trondheim eventually begin to age unnaturally. Scully develops a theory that Ardent is sailing near a metallic object beneath the ocean, and that it has caused free radicals to rapidly oxidize their bodies. When Mulder notices that the ship's sewage pipe is the only one not corroded through, the agents realize that something from the ocean contaminated Ardent's potable water and led to the aging; Olafsson and his men remained unaffected due to their consumption of recycled water from the sewage system. Desperate to survive, Trondheim kills Olafsson after he reveals the secret and sets out to keep the water for himself.

Scully learns from blood tests that the contaminated water causes rapid oxidative damage and dramatically increases sodium chloride in the body. She tries to ration the drinkable water amongst the three but discovers Trondheim attempting to hoard what little that remains. Trondheim locks himself in the sewage hold, forcing Scully to use minuscule supplies to keep Mulder alive. The mysterious oxidant eventually eats through Ardent's hull, flooding the sewage hold and drowning Trondheim. The agents both lose consciousness shortly before Navy rescuers arrive at the ship. Scully comes to at the hospital, where she is told that her written observations on the case helped naval doctors reverse their aging and save Mulder from near-certain death. Scully says that she wants to return to Ardent for more research, but the doctor tells her that the ship sank shortly after their rescue due to the flooding.

== Production ==
=== Writing ===
Prior to this episode being produced, the Canadian Forces had granted permission for the show to use HMCS Mackenzie (a decommissioned destroyer) for the production of "Colony" and "End Game". Series creator Chris Carter, wanting to take full advantage of this rare opportunity, asked Howard Gordon to write another episode that could also be filmed on the ship. In the book The Unofficial X-Files Companion, N.E. Genge notes that aspects of the episode bear striking resemblances to the Philadelphia Experiment, the apocryphal naval military experiment that lives on as an urban legend.

=== Filming ===
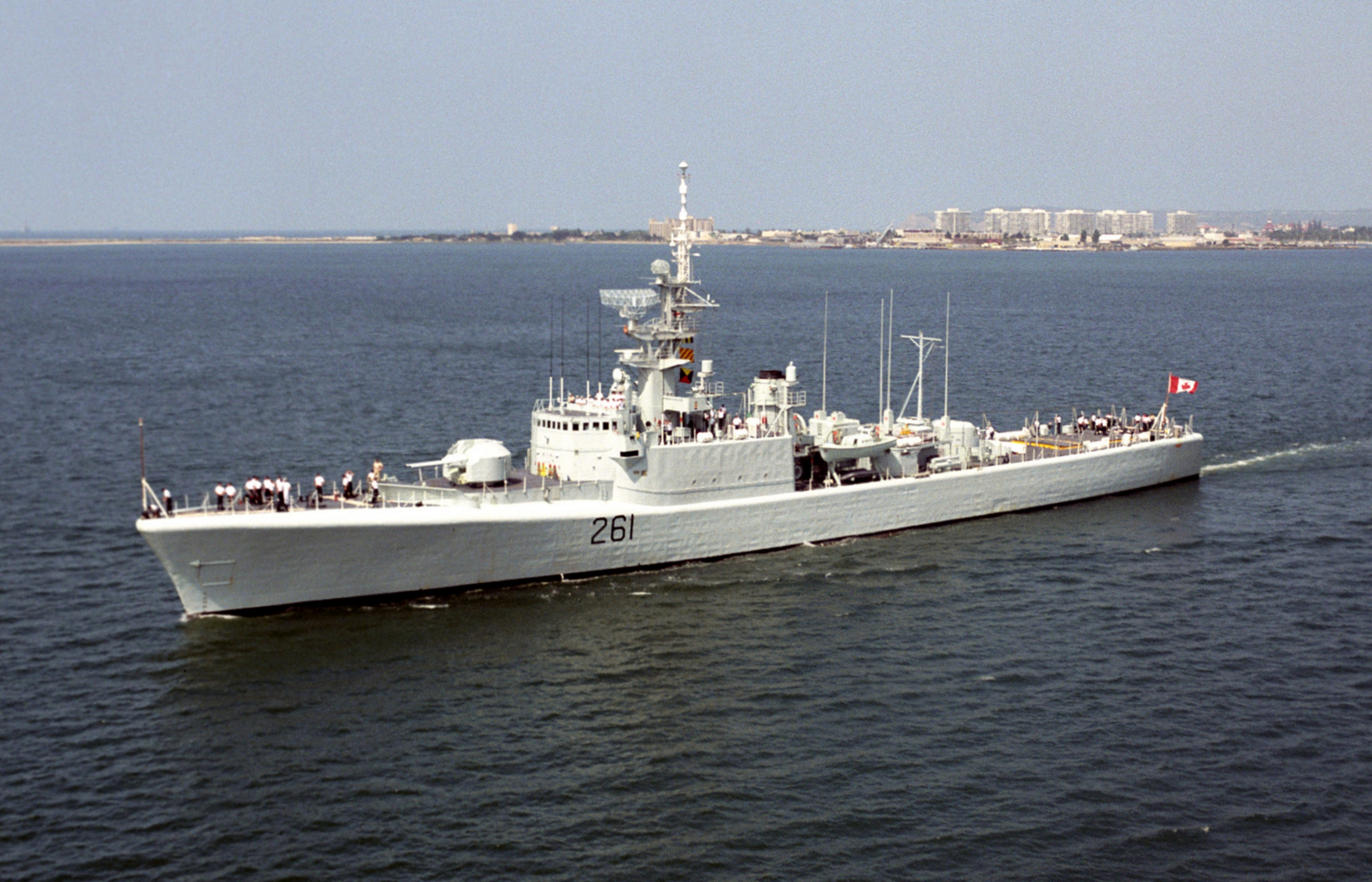
HMCS Mackenzie stood in for USS Ardent

It was initially believed that by using the same set for three episodes, the production crew would be given something of a break; before the script for "Død Kalm" was finished, Carter even expressed his belief that the episode would provide everyone with a "great rest". Unfortunately, when the crew began using the ship, a number of problems set in. For one thing, the low temperatures and cramped quarters made the filming process uncomfortable for both the cast and crew. Moreover, the makeup required to make Duchovny and Anderson look aged took several hours each day to apply, causing significant delays. These issues later led director Rob Bowman to dub "Død Kalm" the "episode from Hell".

The show's production crew shot most of the episode's interior and exterior scenes on Mackenzie. The ship was repainted "rust brown" in order to more closely resemble an abandoned ship—a technique Graeme Murray referred to as "paint-aged." Mackenzie had originally been moored at New Westminster Quay, but in order to avoid light pollution from the Greater Vancouver area during exterior shots, the ship was moved to a more remote location in the Strait of Georgia—a move that cost the show around $10,000. Shortly after production of "Død Kalm" was finished, Mackenzie was scuttled and now serves as an artificial reef off the Strait.

To ease filming, the producers sought out a set that they could use as both a bar and a hospital—a task initially believed "impossible" by the show's location scouts. Eventually, Jericho Sailing Club in Vancouver was selected. When the set was completed, the cast and crew of "Død Kalm" reportedly found it "amazing". Duchovny was particularly pleased because it was only a short distance away from where he was living at the time. The producers subsequently decided to find possible locations closer to where the main stars were living in order to ease future filming.

== Broadcast and reception ==
"Død Kalm" premiered on the Fox network on March 10, 1995. This episode earned a Nielsen rating of 10.7, with an 18 share, meaning that roughly 10.7 percent of all television-equipped households, and 18 percent of households watching television, were tuned into the episode. It was viewed by 10.2 million households.

"Død Kalm" received mostly mixed to moderately positive reviews. Entertainment Weekly gave "Død Kalm" a B, noting that, "Despite clumsy makeup, isolation pays off again, and Mulder and Scully get to try a little tenderness." Emily St. James from The A.V. Club, despite noting her original dislike for the episode, awarded it a B rating and wrote, "This episode works, almost in spite of itself. There are so many nice little moments here [...] it's a script that pauses from the constant horror the show had been serving up for several episodes in a row to just tell an unsettling, ultimately moving tale of two friends who look into the abyss and somehow don't fall."

Robert Shearman, in his book Wanting to Believe: A Critical Guide to The X-Files, Millennium & The Lone Gunmen, rated the episode three-and-a-half stars out of five. Shearman noted that, while the episode's premise "brims over with atmosphere", the ending of "Død Kalm" was extremely lacking. He further argued "that if the writers can only devise a plot which paints them into a corner so awkward there's no realistic way they can get out, then they shouldn't write the story at all." Shearman also criticized the episode's make up, writing that while "Scully looks like a credible old lady, Mulder [looks] like a man wearing several layers of latex."

== Bibliography ==
- Genge, N.E. (1999). The Unofficial X-Files Companion. Crown Trade. ISBN 0-517-88601-4.
- Gradnitzer, Louisa; Pittson, Todd (1999). X Marks the Spot: On Location with The X-Files. Arsenal Pulp Press. ISBN 1-55152-066-4.
- Lovece, Frank (1996). The X-Files Declassified. Citadel Press. ISBN 0-8065-1745-X.
- Lowry, Brian (1995). The Truth is Out There: The Official Guide to the X-Files. Harper Prism. ISBN 0-06-105330-9.
- Shearman, Robert; Pearson, Lars (2009). Wanting to Believe: A Critical Guide to The X-Files, Millennium & The Lone Gunmen. Mad Norwegian Press. ISBN 978-0-9759446-9-1.
