= Cape-class maintenance ship =

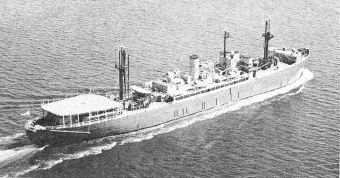
- HMCS Cape Breton

Class overview
- Name: Cape class
- Builders: Burrard Dry Dock, Vancouver
- Operators: Royal Navy; Royal Canadian Navy; Royal Netherlands Navy
- In commission: 1944–1975
- Completed: 2
- Retired: 2

General characteristics
- Type: Maintenance ship
- Displacement: 8,580 long tons (8,718 t) standard; 11,270 long tons (11,451 t) full load
- Length: 441 ft 6 in (134.57 m)
- Beam: 57 ft (17 m)
- Draught: 20 ft (6.1 m)
- Propulsion: Oil-fired triple expansion steam engines, 2 boilers, 1 shaft, 2,500 ihp (1,864 kW)
- Speed: 11 knots (20 km/h; 13 mph)
- Complement: 270
- Aviation facilities: Helicopter landing deck

The Cape class consists of two escort maintenance ships of the Royal Canadian Navy (RCN). The ships were built in Canada as Beachy Head-class maintenance ships for the Royal Navy, but were acquired by Canada in 1952. They were commissioned into the RCN in 1959 as HMCS Cape Breton and HMCS Cape Scott. Cape Scott served on the east coast until 1972, after which the ship became a stationary repair vessel at Halifax, Nova Scotia until 1975. The vessel was broken up in 1978. Cape Breton served initially as a school ship on the east coast before transferring to the west coast of Canada in 1959. The maintenance ship remained in service until 1964, when she was laid up at Esquimalt, British Columbia as a maintenance facility. Cape Breton remained in this service until 1993. The vessel was then sold for use as an artificial reef and sunk off the coast of British Columbia.

== Design and description ==
The ships of the class had a standard displacement of 8,550 long tons (8,690 t) and 11,270 long tons (11,450 t) fully loaded. They were 441 feet 6 inches (134.57 m) long overall and 425 feet 0 inches (129.54 m) between perpendiculars with a beam of 57 feet (17 m) and a draught of 20 feet (6.1 m). The vessels were propelled by one shaft driven by a reciprocating triple expansion steam engine powered by steam from two Foster Wheeler boilers, creating 2,500 indicated horsepower (1,900 kW). This gave the vessels a maximum speed of 11 knots (20 km/h; 13 mph). The vessels had a complement of 270.

Upon conversion to a mobile repair ship, the vessels were equipped with landing pads for Sikorsky H04S helicopters situated aft. A decompression chamber was installed and shops for multiple trades such as engineering, diesel engine repair, sheet metal welding, coppersmith and electronic repair among others were created within the ship. The vessels were also equipped with an eight-berth hospital, sick bay, X-ray room, medical lab, dental clinic and lab.

== Ships ==
Cape class construction data
Name	Builder	Laid down	Launched	Commissioned	Paid off	Fate
Cape Breton	Burrard Dry Dock, British Columbia	5 July 1944	7 October 1944	16 November 1959	10 February 1964	Sunk as artificial reef 20 October 2001
Cape Scott	Burrard Dry Dock, British Columbia	8 June 1944	27 November 1944	28 January 1959	1 July 1970	Scrapped Texas 1978

== Service history ==
HMS Beachy Head and HMS Flamborough Head were both constructed by Burrard Dry Dock in Vancouver, British Columbia for the Royal Navy during the Second World War as part of the Beachy Head class. Both ships continued in service with the Royal Navy after the war until 1947, when Beachy Head was loaned to the Royal Netherlands Navy in 1947 and renamed HNLMS Vulkaan. She served with the Netherlands navy until 1952 when she was returned to the Royal Navy and resumed her old name. In 1953, both Beachy Head and Flamborough Head were sold to the Royal Canadian Navy and renamed Cape Scott and Cape Breton respectively. However, Cape Scott was not commissioned until 1959, after Cape Breton departed for the West Coast of Canada.

=== Canadian service ===
Cape Breton was commissioned into the RCN on 31 January 1953. She served at Halifax with the then unnamed Cape Scott alongside providing repair services and classroom facilities. In 1958, Cape Breton was transferred to the West Coast. Cape Scott was refitted in 1958 and commissioned into the RCN in 1959 and was stationed in Halifax until paid off into the reserve on 1 July 1970. In 1972 Cape Scott was re-designated Fleet Maintenance Group (Atlantic), but was declared surplus in 1975 as the group was moved ashore. The vessel was sold for scrap in 1978 and broken up in Texas in 1978.

Cape Breton upon arrival at CFB Esquimalt, was refitted as an escort maintenance ship and re-commissioned 16 November 1959. On 10 February 1964, Cape Breton was paid off into the reserve, but served as a towed mobile support and accommodation vessel until 1993 as part of Fleet Maintenance Group (Pacific). On 20 October 2001 Cape Breton was sunk in the waters near Nanaimo, British Columbia as an artificial reef. The vessel's stern was kept ashore in North Vancouver, British Columbia and placed on display along the waterfront. In 2013 the city voted to remove the stern assembly and dismantling began in December.
