= Special Delivery (2000 film) =

- Film Poster
- Written by: Steven Kampmann
- Story by: Steven Kampmann; Chris Kampmann; Bosco Flanagan
- Directed by: Mark Jean
- Starring: Andy Dick; David Lewis; Megan Leitch; Jodelle Ferland; Ralph Alderman
- Music by: James Jandrisch
- Countries of origin: United States; Canada
- Original language: English

Production
- Producers: George Horie; Shawn Williamson
- Cinematography: Henry M. Lebo
- Running time: 88 minutes
- Production companies: Fox Family Films; Shavick Entertainment; TVA International

Original release
- Network: Fox Family
- Release: December 10, 2000

Special Delivery is a 2000 television film directed by Mark Jean and starring Andy Dick. It premiered on Fox Family on December 10, 2000 as part their 25 Days of Christmas programming block.

== Premise ==
A bumbling courier at a private adoption agency botches the delivery of a baby to its new parents in time for Christmas when he misplaces their baby en route.

== Cast ==
- Andy Dick as Lloyd Stedman
- David Lewis as Jack Beck
- Megan Leitch as Robin Beck
- Jodelle Ferland as Samantha Beck
- Ralph Alderman as Sarge Reilly
- Nels Lennarson as Customs Officer
- Donna White as Vera Reilly
- Kevin McNulty as Fred Anders (as Kevin Mcnulty)
- Jennifer Clement as Judy
- Greg Rogers as Charlie Zwick
- Ken Camroux as Lawrence Beck
- Rebecca Toolan as Virginia Beck
- Jocelyne Loewen as Ashley
- Davis Poon as Beck Baby
- Victoria Poon as Beck Baby

== Reception ==
Raggle Fraggle Reviews criticized almost every aspect of the film and concluded (Note: Entire quotation is reprinted as in the original, including grammar errors): "The film is not funny at all, a lot of the comedy relies on the comedic affect [sic] of slap stick and its [sic] just awful, the jokes are really badly paced and a lot of the time they are either really over the top or extremely unrealistic."

== See also ==
- List of Christmas films
