= Artificial Reef Society of British Columbia =

Canadian non-profit to create artificial reefs for habitat enhancement and recreation

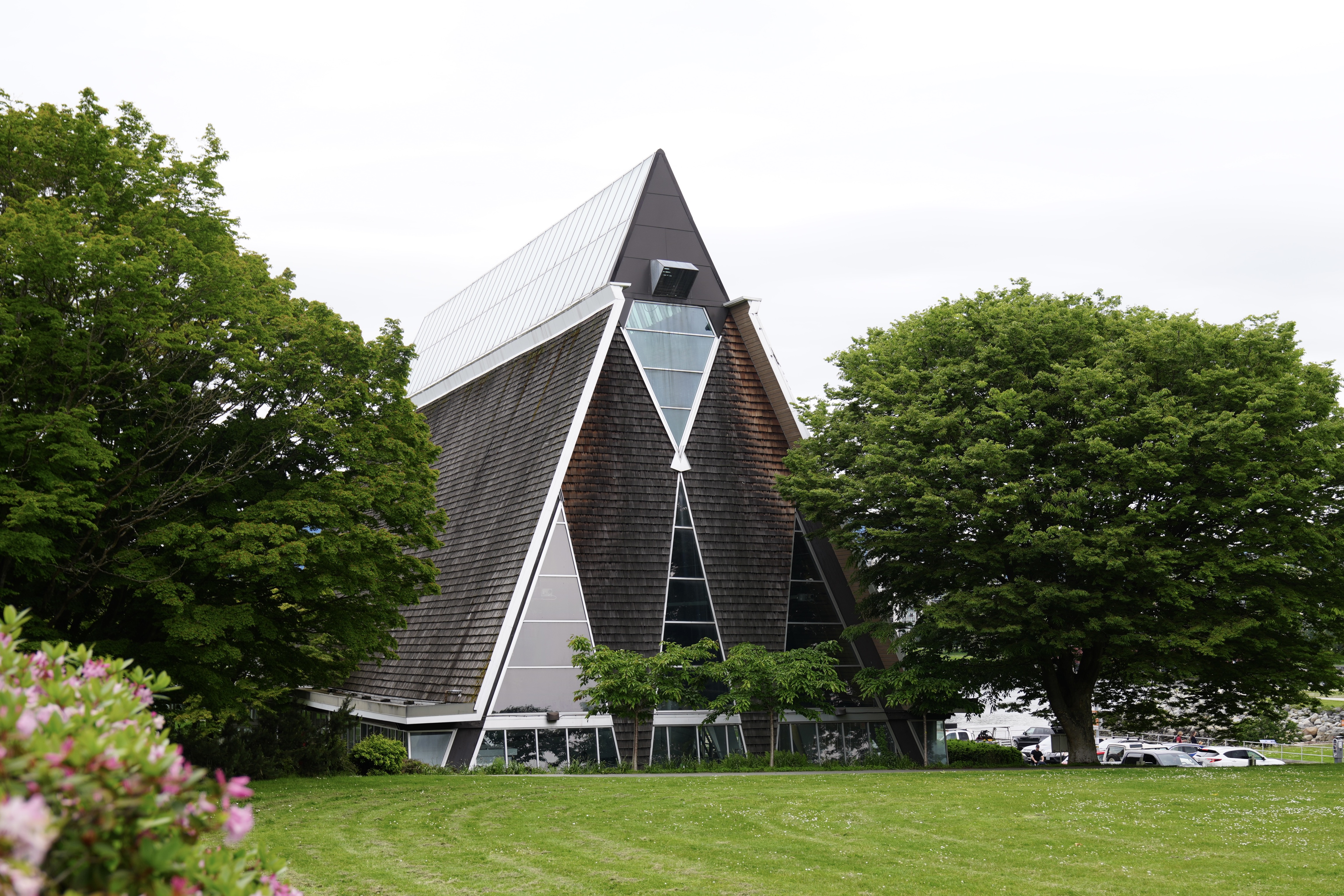
- ARSBC headquarters in the Vancouver Maritime Museum
- Abbreviation: ARSBC
- Founded: 1992; 34 years ago
- Type: Nonprofit organization, charitable organization
- Headquarters: Vancouver, British Columbia
- Region served: British Columbia Coast, Gulf Islands
- President and CEO: Howard Robins
- Vice President and COO: Vanessa Tweed
- Website: https://artificialreefsocietybc.ca/index.html

The Artificial Reef Society of British Columbia (ARSBC) is a registered non-profit society based in Vancouver, British Columbia, and has been a registered tax-deductible charity in Canada since 1992. Its aim is to create environmentally and economically sustainable artificial reefs (ARs) in British Columbia and around the world for the protection and enhancement of sensitive marine habitats, while also providing interesting destinations for the enjoyment of scuba divers.

The Society operates without any paid employees. Instead, it is driven by a dedicated volunteer Board of Directors alongside hundreds of volunteers hailing from British Columbia, Alberta, and the northwest United States, all actively involved in its projects, and is based out of the Vancouver Maritime Museum.

Since its founding in 1991, eight ships and one Boeing 737 have been sunk off the west coast of BC. These wreckages act as a safe starting point for creating additional biodiversity, similar to ship graveyards, and other man-made structures that became ARs without the toxic leaching hazardous materials such as paints and heavy metals.

The Artificial Reef Society of BC is a member of the Association of British Columbia Marine Industries as listed on their website.

== Mission ==
The organization's primary mission revolves around the establishment and maintenance of artificial reefs. While also enhancing the scuba diving experience and advancing knowledge and awareness regarding the technology and safety procedures associated with artificial reef creation. ARSBC is also dedicated to promoting the use of artificial reefs as a sustainable option to help alleviate the environmental impact caused by scuba diving activities, particularly in historically significant or ecologically sensitive areas.

== Media coverage ==
On January 24th 2007, an episode of Mega Builders aired featuring the preparation and sinking of the Boeing 737 by the ARSBC.

The Annapolis was one of the main topics in Ocean Wise - Ocean Watch Report in 2020

Canadian aboriginal documentary series Water Worlds recognizes the Artificial Reef Society of British Columbia in episode 11 "Finding Balance" for aligning its mandate with First Nations core values for the restoration and protection of sensitive marine habitat.

== Method ==
The Artificial Reef Society of British Columbia (ARSBC) is the leading organization dedicated to converting old ships into permanent marine habitats. These steel-hulled warships undergo a long processes of stripping, recycling, and repurposing, before being carefully sunk to become artificial reefs. The structures quickly support the growth of self-sustaining ecosystems in the marine environment. These man-made reefs eventually transform into environments that closely resemble real reefs, with vibrant and diverse marine life. While also becoming locations for eco-adventure scuba diving and points of interest to the science community.

== Completed projects ==
- Sunk August 11, 1991: MV G.B. Church off Portland Island, near Sidney, BC at 48°43.323′ N, 123°21.339′ W [1]
- Sunk December 5, 1992: HMCS Chaudière (DDE 235) (II) off Kunechin Point, in Porpoise Bay, near Sechelt, BC at 49° 37.694' N, 123° 48.699' W [2]
- Sunk September 16, 1995: HMCS Mackenzie (DDE 261) off Gooch Island, near Sidney, BC at 48°40.094′ N, 123°17.170′ W [3]
- Sunk June 22, 1996: HMCS Columbia (DDE 260) (II) off Maud Island, near Campbell River, BC at 50°8.031′ N, 125°20.152′ W [4]
- Sunk June 14, 1997: HMCS Saskatchewan (DDE 262) (II) off Snake Island, near Nanaimo, BC at 49°12.96′ N, 123°53.070′ W [5]
- Sunk October 20, 2001: HMCS Cape Breton (ARE 100) (II) off Snake Island, near Nanaimo, BC at 49°12.88′ N, 123°53.067′ W [6]
- Sunk January 14, 2006: Xihwu Boeing 737-200 off Chemainus, BC at 48°56.142′ N, 123°43.130′ W [7]
- Sunk April 4, 2015: HMCS Annapolis (DDH 265) off Gambier Island in Halkett Bay Marine Provincial Park, Howe Sound BC at 49°26.95′ N, 123°19.85′ W [8].
- Sunk July 23, 2018: USS YOGN-82 off Mission Beach, near Powell River, BC at 49°50.977′ N 124°32.332′ W [9]

== Reports & findings ==
Since its initial sinking, the Annapolis has been used as a center point by the organization to conduct ecological studies and record biodiversity.

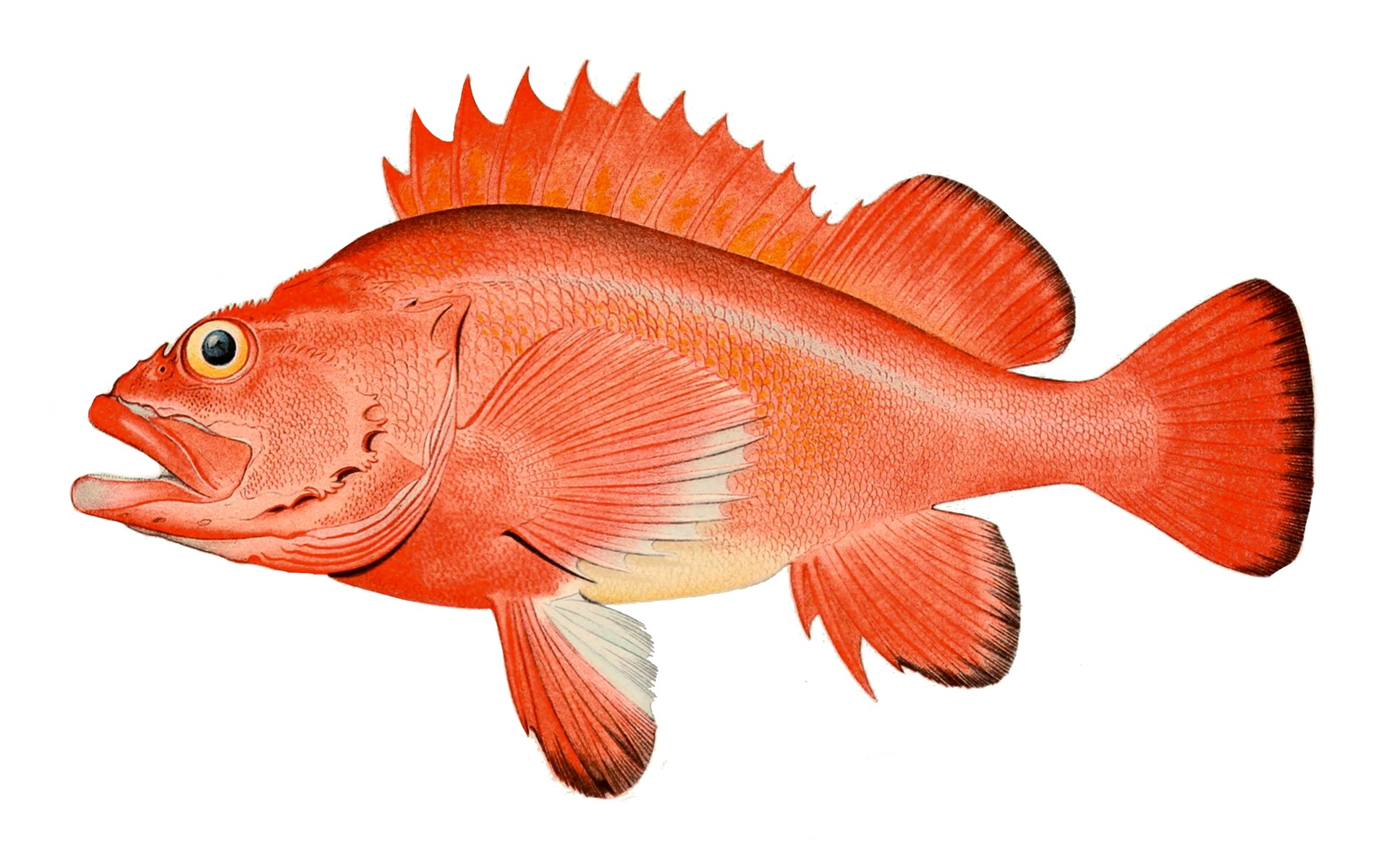
Sebastes aleutianus - considered threatened and was one of the key foci of the study

In 2019 a study was released that assessed rockfish and other groundfish abundance and variability between natural and artificial reefs near to each other. The study, which was done using remotely operated underwater vehicles (ROV), found that while, natural reefs had higher species richness, artificial reefs had greater species abundance. However, the artificial reefs displayed much greater variability when compared to the natural reefs in both abundance and richness. The ARs selected for this study included, M.V. G.B. Church, HMCS Mackenzie, Cape Breton, Saskatchewan, Columbia, Annapolis, and the Boeing 737. As well as two unintentional wreckages, the Capilano, and Shamrock.

== Controversy ==
=== Annapolis ===
Tributyltin chloride - the main concern of the Save Halkett Bay Marine Park Society

The project, which started in 2008 with the purchase of the Annapolis from the Canadian Government, almost immediately encountered some issues and sparked controversies. Financial issues, shifting federal regulations, emerging environmental concerns, and legal disputes led to extended timelines and increased costs. Most notable legal challenges posed by the group, Save Halkett Bay Marine Park Society temporarily halted the sinking, citing concerns over environmental hazards posed by the presence of Tributyltin chlorode (TBTs) in the ship's paint. However, the federal court ruled in favour of ARSBC, stating that the amount of TBTs remaining on the hull fell within allowable limits set by legislation.

== See also ==
- Artificial reef – Human-made underwater structure that functions as a reef
- Artificial reefs in Japan – Underwater structures to increase sustainable fishing activities
- Marine debris – Human-created solid waste in the sea or ocean
- Multi-purpose reef – Underwater structure intended to produce surfable waves from prevailing swell
- Scuttling – Act of deliberately sinking a ship by allowing water to flow into the hull
- Ship graveyard – Location where scrapped ships are left
- Sinking ships for wreck diving sites – Scuttling old ships to produce artificial reefs
- Cancún Underwater Museum – Underwater display of sculpture in Cancún, Mexico
