= HMCS Cape Breton (ARE 100) =

Royal Canadian Navy Cape-class maintenance ship

Coordinates: 49°12.88′N 123°53.067′W

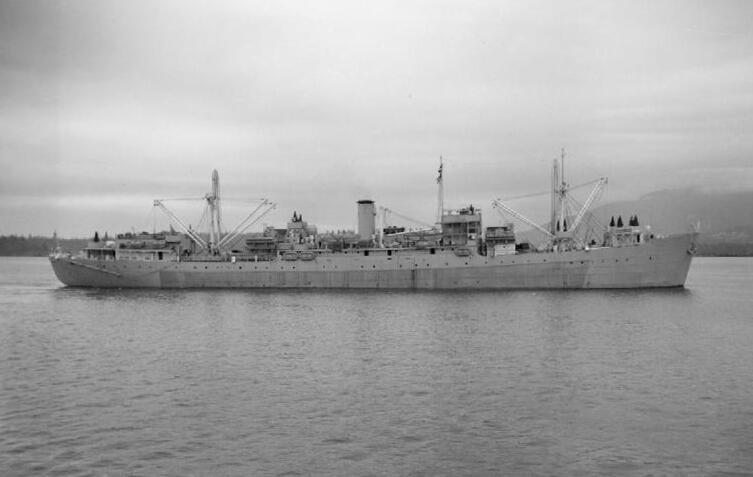
- HMS Flamborough Head underway in coastal waters.

History

United Kingdom
- Name: Flamborough Head
- Builder: Burrard Dry Dock, North Vancouver
- Laid down: 5 July 1944
- Launched: 7 October 1944
- Commissioned: 2 May 1945
- Out of service: 1952
- Fate: Sold to Canadian Government, 1952

Canada
- Name: Cape Breton
- Namesake: Cape Breton
- Acquired: 31 January 1953
- Commissioned: 16 November 1959
- Decommissioned: 10 February 1964
- Motto: "La chance ne change pas la course" (Chance changes not our course)
- Honours and awards: Arctic, 1944; Normandy, 1944; Atlantic, 1944–45
- Fate: Sunk as artificial reef, 20 October 2001, near Nanaimo, Vancouver Island
- Badge: Azure, a spur gear argent charged with a device consisting of three ermine spots conjoined in the center, one pointing to the chief, once to the dexter base and once to the sinister base in trefoil fashion sable, and between them issuing from the center, three thistle blooms coloured proper.

General characteristics
- Class & type: Cape-class maintenance ship
- Displacement: 8,580 long tons (8,718 t)
- Length: 134.6 m (441 ft 7.2 in)
- Beam: 17.4 m (57 ft 1.0 in)
- Draught: 6.1 m (20.0 ft)
- Propulsion: Oil-fired triple expansion steam engines, 2 Foster Wheeler boilers, 1 shaft, 6,000 hp (4,474 kW)
- Speed: 11 knots (20 km/h; 13 mph)
- Complement: 270
- Armament: 16 × 20 mm guns
- Aircraft carried: can handle Sikorsky HO4S
- Aviation facilities: helicopter pad

HMCS Cape Breton was a Royal Canadian Navy Cape-class maintenance ship. Originally built for the Royal Navy as HMS Flamborough Head in 1944, she was transferred in 1952. Upon her commissioning she was the second ship to bear the name Cape Breton. She served operationally from 1953–1964, when she was laid up. She was used as a floating machine shop until the late-1990s, before being sold for use as an artificial reef off the coast of British Columbia.

== Design and description ==
Flamborough Head was one of the 21 Beachy Head-class repair ships, built for the Royal Navy during the Second World War. The Beachy Heads were modified versions of the Fort ship, called the "Victory" design. The ships of the class had a standard displacement of 8,550 long tons (8,690 t) and 11,270 long tons (11,450 t) fully loaded. They were 441 feet 6 inches (134.57 m) long overall and 425 feet 0 inches (129.54 m) between perpendiculars with a beam of 57 feet (17 m) and a draught of 20 feet (6.1 m). The vessels were propelled by one shaft driven by a reciprocating triple expansion steam engine powered by steam from two Foster Wheeler boilers, creating 2,500 indicated horsepower (1,900 kW). This gave the vessels a maximum speed of 11 knots (20 km/h; 13 mph). The vessels had a complement of 270.

While in British service the vessel was armed with sixteen single-mounted Oerlikon 20 mm cannons. Upon conversion to a mobile repair ship, the vessels were equipped with landing pads for Sikorsky H04S helicopters situated aft. A decompression chamber was installed and shops for multiple trades such as engineering, diesel engine repair, sheet metal welding, coppersmith and electronic repair among others were created within the ship. The vessels were also equipped with an eight-berth hospital, sick bay, X-ray room, medical lab, dental clinic and lab.

== Construction and career ==
Flamborough Head (pennant F88) was laid down on 5 July 1944 by Burrard Dry Dock in Vancouver, British Columbia and launched on 7 October 1944. She was completed on 2 May 1945. Flamborough Head finished the Second World War in service with the Royal Navy and continued into the postwar period until 1952, when she was transferred to Canada.

=== Service with Canada ===
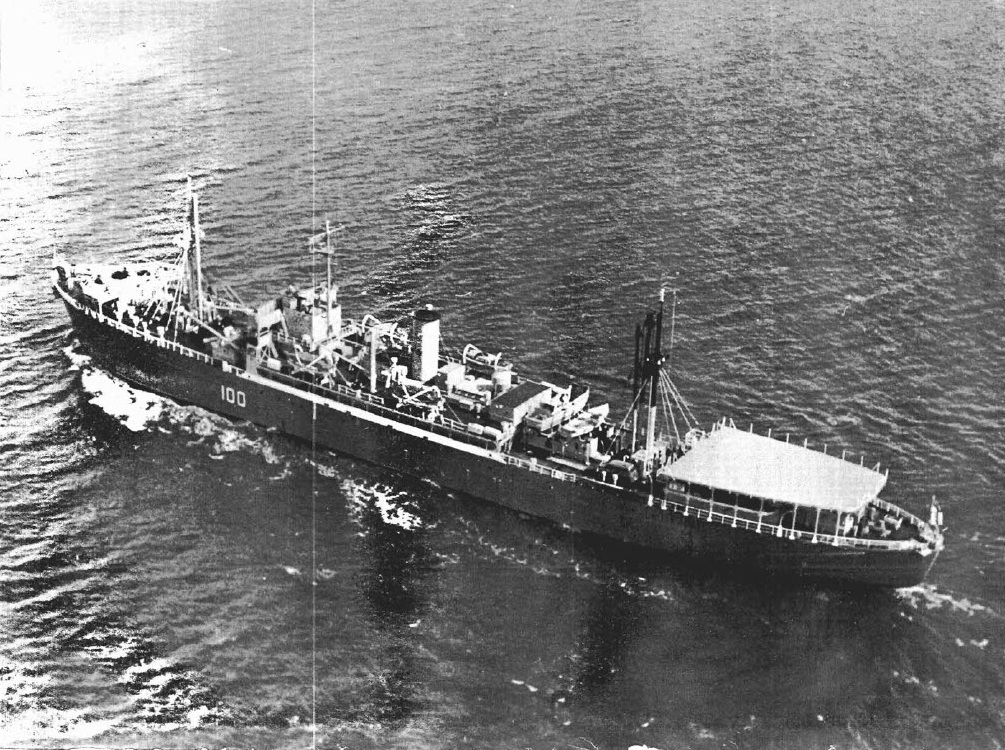
HMCS Cape Breton pictured in January 1962's Crowsnest magazine

Flamborough Head was transferred to the Royal Canadian Navy in 1952. She was officially renamed and recommissioned Cape Breton on 31 January 1953. Cape Breton was assigned to the Atlantic Fleet and homeported at Halifax, Nova Scotia until 25 August 1958 as a repair and training ship. She had been acquired in an effort to expand the range of the fleet and to sustain operations against Soviet submarines deploying west. In 1958 she sailed to Esquimalt, British Columbia where she was converted to an escort maintenance ship, she was recommissioned on 16 November 1959. The conversion involved installing engineering and electrical workshops and the fitting of a helicopter landing platform. Sea trials were performed in Magdalena Bay, Mexico in February 1960, returning to Canada in March after visiting San Diego.

On 10 February 1964, Cape Breton was paid off into the reserve. This was due to efforts to cut costs. From there on, the vessel served as a towed support facility and accommodation vessel at Esquimalt under the designation Maintenance Group (Pacific). In 1993, she was replaced by a shore building. She was sold to the Artificial Reef Society of British Columbia (ARSBC) for use as an artificial reef.

=== Fate ===
Except for a short section of the stern and her engines, the ship was sunk in the waters of British Columbia on 20 October 2001 by the ARSBC after extensive cleaning to meet Environment Canada requirements. The ship now lies near Snake Island in Nanaimo harbour for use as a scuba diving site. Cape Breton sank upright to a depth of 145 feet (44 m). Her crow's nest reaches up to 40 feet (12 m) below the surface, the main deck lies at 100 feet (30 m).

The stern was donated to the city of North Vancouver, British Columbia by the Artificial Reef Society. They placed it on display on the waterfront in 2001 with the plan to eventually develop the area into a maritime museum. However, those plans fell through in 2007 from lack of support. On 9 September 2013, the city council voted to dispose of the stern as the cradle upon which it was resting began to near the end of its life, and it was dismantled.

The Christening Bells Project at Canadian Forces Base Esquimalt (CFB Esquimalt) Naval and Military Museum includes information from the ship's bell of HMCS Cape Breton, which was used for baptism of babies on board ship from 1959–1971. The bell is currently held by the CFB Esquimalt Naval & Military Museum, Esquimalt, British Columbia.

Fleet Maintenance Facility Cape Breton was formed in 1996 at CFB Esquimalt from the amalgamation of three shore-based units: Ship Repair Unit (Pacific), Naval Engineering Unit (Pacific), and Fleet Maintenance Group (Pacific). Fleet Maintenance Facility Cape Breton took its name from HMCS Cape Breton.
