= HMCS Mackenzie (DDE 261) =

Mackenzie-class destroyer of the Royal Canadian Navy

Coordinates: 48°40.094′N 123°17.17′W

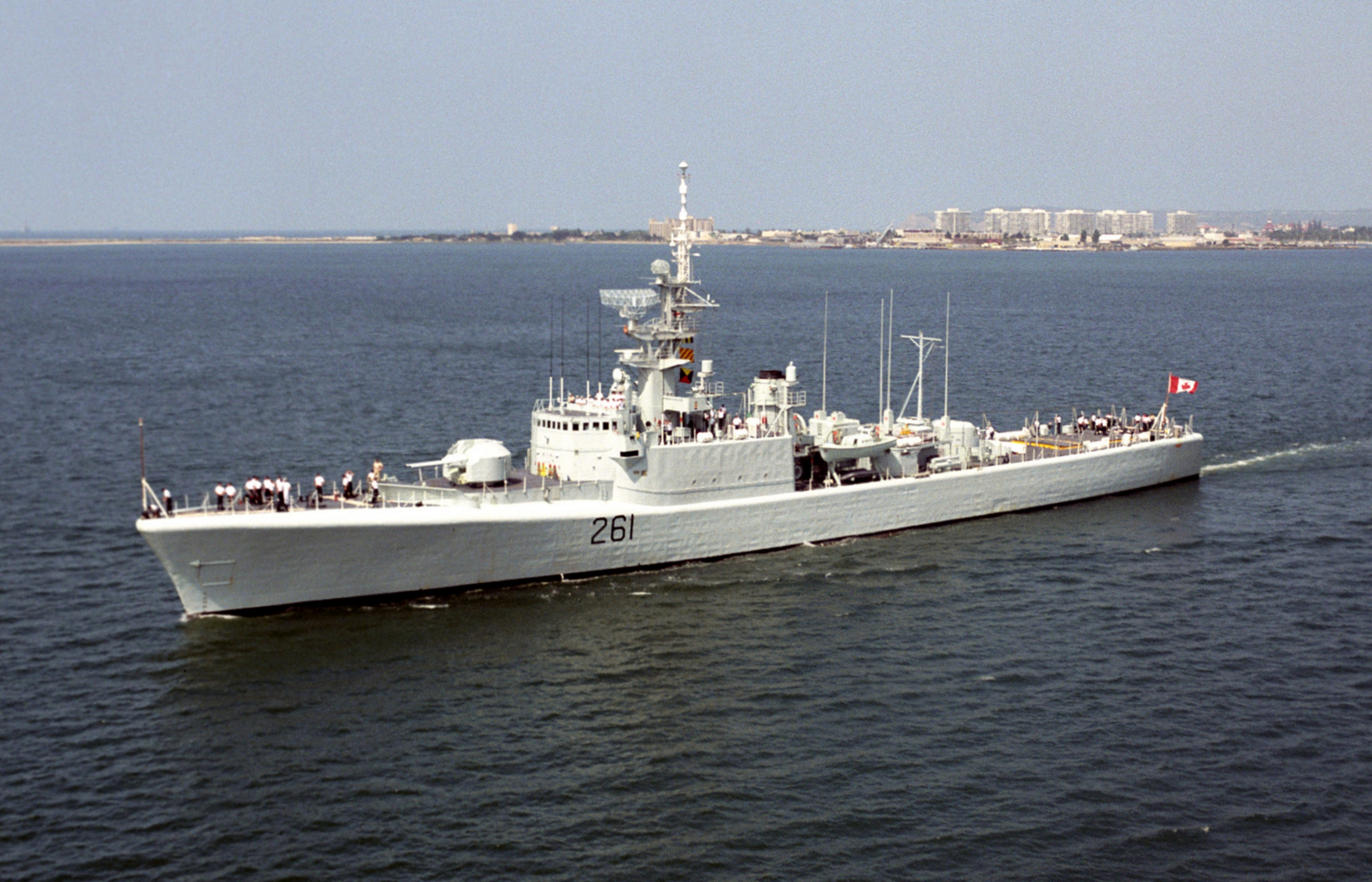
- HMCS Mackenzie (DDE 261) off San Diego, in 1992

History

Canada
- Name: Mackenzie
- Namesake: Mackenzie River
- Ordered: 1957
- Builder: Canadian Vickers, Montreal
- Laid down: 15 December 1958
- Launched: 25 May 1961
- Commissioned: 6 October 1962
- Decommissioned: 3 August 1993
- Refit: 1985 (DELEX)
- Identification: Classification DDE 261
- Motto: "By virtue and valour"
- Fate: Sold in March 1995 to the Artificial Reef Society of British Columbia Scuttled off Sidney on 16 September 1995.
- Badge: Gules, a bend wavy argent upon which a like bendlet azure, and over all a lion rampant or, armed and langued of the third, charged on the shoulder with a hurt upon which a representation of a compass rose of eight points argent, the vertical and horizontal pointers extending beyond the perimeter of the hurt.

General characteristics
- Class & type: Mackenzie-class destroyer
- Displacement: 2,880 t (2,830 long tons) full load
- Length: 366 ft (111.6 m)
- Beam: 42 ft (12.8 m)
- Draught: 13 ft 6 in (4.1 m)
- Installed power: 2 × Babcock & Wilcox boilers; 30,000 shp (22,000 kW)
- Propulsion: 2 shafts; 2 × English-Electric geared steam turbines
- Speed: 28 kn (51.9 km/h)
- Complement: 290 regular, 170–210 training
- Sensors & processing systems: 1 × SPS-12 air search radar; 1 × SPS-10B surface search radar; 1 × Sperry Mk.2 navigation radar; 1 × SQS-501 high frequency bottom profiler sonar; 1 × SQS-502 high frequency mortar control sonar; 1 × SQS-503 hull mounted active search sonar; 1 × SQS-11 hull mounted active search sonar
- Electronic warfare & decoys: 1 × DAU (replaced by SRD 501) high frequency direction finder; 1 × WLR 1C radar analyzer; 1 × UPD 501 radar detector
- Armament: 1 × 3-inch/70 Mk.6 Vickers twin mount forward; 1 × 3-inch/50 Mk.33 FMC twin mount aft; 2 × Mk NC 10 Limbo ASW mortars; 2 × single Mk.2 "K-gun" launchers with homing torpedoes; 1 × 103 mm Bofors illumination rocket launcher

HMCS Mackenzie was a Mackenzie-class destroyer that served in the Royal Canadian Navy (RCN) and later the Canadian Forces. She was the lead ship of her class and is the first Canadian naval unit to carry this name. The ship was named for the Mackenzie River, the largest river system in Canada and runs primarily through the Northwest Territories.

Entering service in 1962, Mackenzie served until 1993, mainly as a training ship. She was sold for use as an artificial reef in 1995 and sunk as such the same year off the coast of British Columbia.

== Design ==
The Mackenzie class was an offshoot of the St. Laurent-class design. Initially planned to be an improved version of the design, budget difficulties led to the Canadian government ordering a repeat of the previous Restigouche class, with improved habitability and better pre-wetting, bridge and weatherdeck fittings to better deal with extreme cold. The original intention was to give the Mackenzie class variable depth sonar during construction, but would have led to delays of up to a year in construction time, which the navy could not accept.

=== General characteristics ===
The Mackenzie-class vessels measured 366 feet (112 m) in length, with a beam of 42 feet (13 m) and a draught of 13 feet 6 inches (4.11 m). The Mackenzies displaced 2,880 tonnes (2,830 long tons) fully loaded and had a complement of 290. (Note: Macpherson and Barrie state the complement as 245 (12 officers and 233 enlisted))

The class was powered by two Babcock & Wilcox boilers connected to the two-shaft English-Electric geared steam turbines creating 30,000 shaft horsepower (22,000 kW). This gave the ships a maximum speed of 28 knots (52 km/h; 32 mph).

=== Armament ===
The most noticeable change for the Mackenzies was the replacement of the forward 3-inch (76 mm)/50 caliber Mk 22 guns of the St. Laurent design (Note: Caliber denotes the length of the barrel. In this case, 50 caliber means that the gun barrel is 50 times as long as it is in diameter) with a dual Vickers 3-inch/70 caliber Mk 6 gun mount and the presence of a fire-control director atop the bridge superstructure. The bridge was raised one full deck higher than on previous classes in order to see over the new gun mount. The class did retain the rear dual 3-inch/50 caliber gun mount and for anti-submarine warfare, the class was provided with two Mk 10 Limbo mortars. The ships were initially fitted with Mark 43 torpedoes to supplement their anti-submarine capability, but were quickly upgraded to the Mark 44 launched from a modified depth charge thrower. This was to give the destroyers the ability to combat submarines from a distance.

=== Sensors ===
The Mackenzie class were equipped with one SPS-12 air search radar, one SPS-10B surface search radar and one Sperry Mk.2 navigation radar. For detection below the surface, the ships had one SQS-501 high frequency bottom profiler sonar, one SQS-503 hull mounted active search sonar, one SQS-502 high frequency mortar control sonar and one SQS-11 hull mounted active search sonar.

=== DELEX refit ===
The DEstroyer Life EXtension (DELEX) refit was born out of the need to extend the life of the steam-powered destroyer escorts of the Canadian Navy in the 1980s until the next generation of surface ship was built. Encompassing all the classes based on the initial St. Laurent (the remaining St. Laurent, Restigouche, Mackenzie, and Annapolis-class vessels), the DELEX upgrades were meant to improve their ability to combat modern Soviet submarines, and to allow them to continue to operate as part of NATO task forces.

The DELEX refit for the Mackenzie class was the same for the Improved Restigouche-class vessels. This meant that the ships would receive the new tactical data system ADLIPS, new radars, new fire control and satellite navigation. They exchanged the SQS-503 sonar for the newer SQS-505 model.

They also received a triple mount for 12.75-inch (324 mm) torpedo tubes that would use the new Mk 46 homing torpedo. The Mark 46 torpedo had a range of 12,000 yards (11,000 m) at over 40 knots (74 km/h; 46 mph) with a high-explosive warhead weighing 96.8 pounds (43.9 kg).

== Construction and career ==
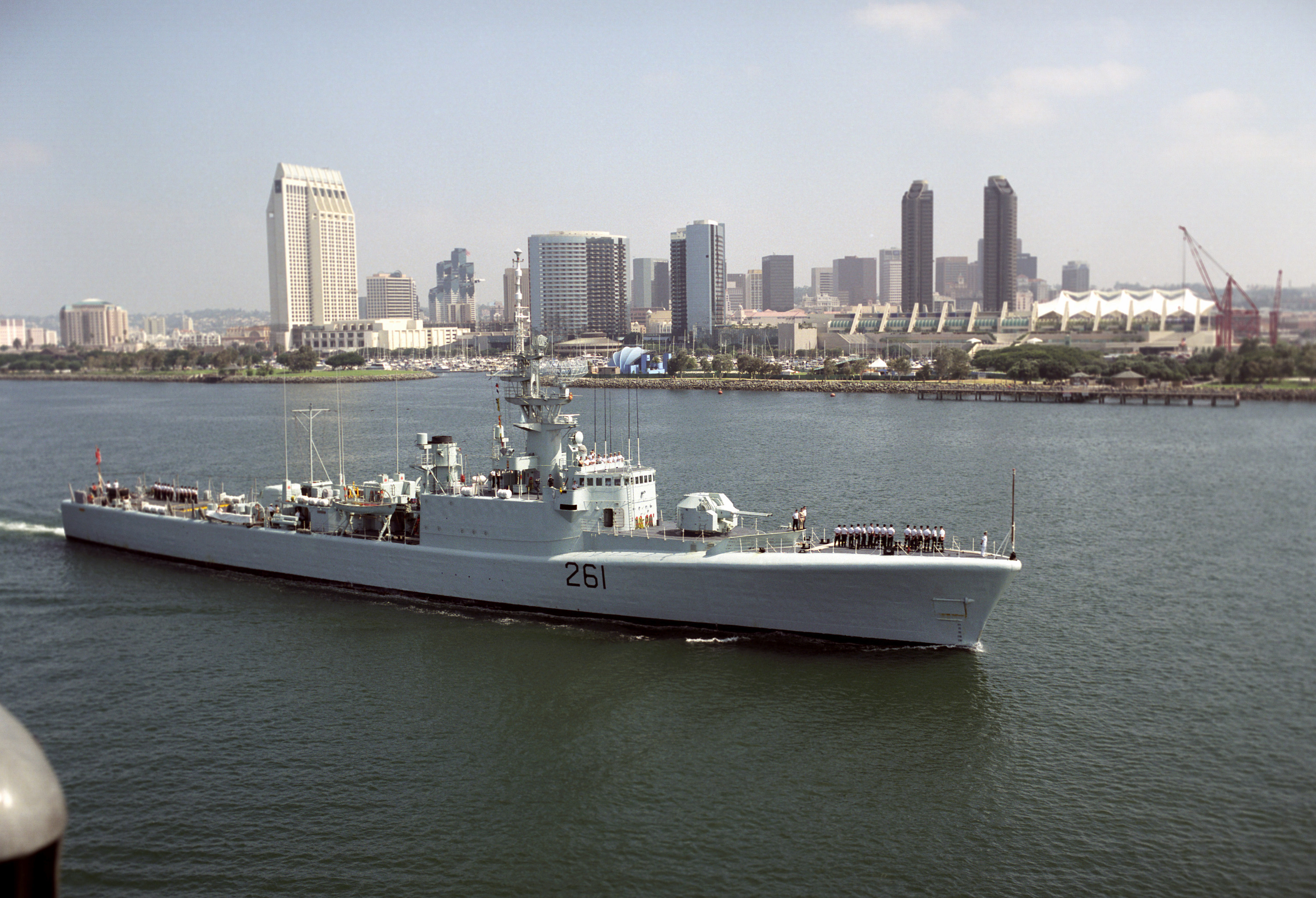
Mackenzie at San Diego in 1992 while participating in RIMPAC '92

Mackenzie was ordered in 1957 and was laid down on 15 December 1958 at Canadian Vickers Ltd., Montreal. The ship was launched on 25 May 1961 and was commissioned into the RCN on 6 October 1962 with the classification number DDE 261.

Assigned to the Atlantic Fleet based at Halifax, Mackenzie transferred to the Pacific on 2 March 1963. She was assigned to the Pacific Fleet as a member of the Fourth Canadian Destroyer Squadron and served largely as a training ship with the RCN and later in the Canadian Forces under Maritime Forces Pacific as part of Training Group Pacific. She was also used for surveillance of the west coast, like in March 1973, when she intercepted drug smugglers off Quatsino Sound. In July 1982, Mackenzie shadowed the Soviet spy ship Aavril Sarychev in Canadian waters which had monitoring the North American west coast for new American submarines. She underwent the DELEX refit between 25 May 1986 and 16 January 1987.

Mackenzie was paid off from Maritime Command on 3 August 1993.

From February 1995 to early March 1995, Mackenzie was used as a set in three episodes for The X-Files. She was seen in "Colony" and "End Game", and was the on-set location for most of the filming of "Død Kalm"

=== As an artificial reef ===
Mackenzie's hulk was purchased by the Artificial Reef Society of British Columbia (ARSBC) in March 1995 for $200,000. She was stripped in spring/summer 1995 of environmental contaminants and scuttled on 16 September 1995 near Isle-de-Lis and Gooch Island, in the Georgia Strait off Sidney, British Columbia. She rests on clay and rock with a 20° list to port.

As a dive site, the location of Mackenzie experiences strong currents during large ebbs. Diving during these conditions is not recommended by the ARSBC. The average visibility in the area is 25 feet (7.6 m) and there is a multitude of sea life in and around the ship. Above 60 feet (18 m), divers can explore the bow and deck guns, superstructure, radar mast, and exhaust stacks. Below 60 feet, divers can explore 5 decks with access portals cut into the ship at various levels. The sea floor meets the bow at 90–100 feet (27–30 m) and the stern at 95–105 feet (29–32 m).

The ship's bell is currently held by the CFB Esquimalt Naval & Military Museum in Esquimalt, British Columbia. During her active life, Mackenzie was affiliated with the Seaforth Highlanders of Canada, a primary reserve regiment in Vancouver.
