= Megan Leitch =

Canadian actress

Megan Leitch is a Canadian actress best known for playing Samantha Mulder on The X-Files.

== Early life ==
Leitch was born in Kamloops, British Columbia. She studied at Langara's Studio 58 and went to the National Theatre School in Montreal.

== Filmography ==
=== Film ===
Year	Title	Role	Notes
1991	The Resurrected	Eliza	
1992	Knight Moves	Mother	
1996	Hard Core Logo	Mary the Fan	
1997	Grey: Digital Target	Tures	
1997	Misbegotten	Serena	
1999	Daydrift	Simone	
2003	See Grace Fly	Gigi	
2006	Mount Pleasant	Female Officer	

=== Television ===
Year	Title	Role	Notes
1989–1991	Bordertown	Sara Simpson / Mrs. Dobbs	2 episodes
1990	It	Library Aide	Episode: "Part 2"
1991	Ranma ½: Nettô-hen	Midori	Episode: "Happosai's Happy Heart!"
1991	Omen IV: The Awakening	Sister Yvonne / Felicity	Television film
1991	Mom P.I.	Marcia	Episode: "Repo Ride"
1993	No Child of Mine	Robin Jenkins	Television film
1994	Cobra	Dolores Brown / Athena	Episode: "Lost in Cyberspace"
1994	The Commish	Peggy Gibbs	Episode: "Who Do You Trust"
1994–1997	Key the Metal Idol	Sakura Kuriyagawa	15 episodes
1995	When the Vows Break	Susan	Television film
1995	Jack Reed: One of Our Own	Rebecca	Television film
1995–2002	The X-Files	Samantha Mulder	5 episodes
1995	Secrets of the X-Files, Part 1	Samantha Mulder	Television special; uncredited
1995	Secrets of the X-Files, Part 2	Samantha Mulder	Television special; uncredited
1996	The Sentinel	Dr. Kimberley Ashe	Episode: "Flight"
1996	Two	Victoria Sloane	Episode: "Victoria's Secret"
1997	Breaking the Surface: The Greg Louganis Story	Megan	Television film
1997	Dead Man's Gun	Brenda Cosgrove	Episode: "The Highwayman"
1998	Silencing Mary	Nina	Television film
1998	Welcome to Paradox	P. Burke	Episode: "The Girl Who Was Plugged In"
1998	Da Vinci's Inquest	Mae Chandler	Episode: "The Stranger Inside"
1998	Cold Squad	Karen Burke	Episode: "Dwayne Douglas Smith"
1998, 2002	The Outer Limits	Barb	2 episodes
1999	Stargate SG-1	Ke'ra / young Linea	Episode: "Past and Present"
2000	So Weird	Mary Johnson	Episode: "Changeling"
2000	Special Delivery	Robin Beck	Television film
2001–2003	X-Men: Evolution	Boom Boom / Tabitha Smith	12 episodes
2002	Glory Days	Beth Jarrett	Episode: "There Goes the Neighborhood"
2002	Beyond Belief: Fact or Fiction	Maggie	1 episode
2004	Touching Evil	Waitress Janice	Episode: "Slash 30"
2004	The Love Crimes of Gillian Guess	Agnes, Claire's Mum	Television film
2005	The Collector	Theo Maspeaky	Episode: "The Pharmacist"
2005	The Colt	Lucy Calloway	Television film
2005	Da Vinci's City Hall	Flaherty	Episode: "Ready to Call in the Horses"
2006	Stargate Atlantis	Captain Helia	Episode: "The Return: Part 1"
2009	Wild Roses	Adele's Assistant	Episode: "Love and Loss"
2009	Supernatural	Mother	Episode: "The Monster at the End of This Book"
2010	Fringe	Elaine	2 episodes
2018	Take Two	Sleep Clinic Doctor	Episode: "All About Ava"
2018–2019	Chilling Adventures of Sabrina	Batibat	3 episodes
2019	The Chronicle Mysteries: The Wrong Man	Heidi Newcombe	Episode: "The Deep End"
2020	A Ruby Herring Mystery	Rose Vitello	Episode: "Prediction Murder"
2020	The Charm Bracelet	Mary Matthews	Television film
2021	Home Before Dark	Molly	2 episodes
2021	Maid	Sasha	Episode: "M"
2022	Under the Banner of Heaven	Doreen Lafferty	Main role, miniseries

== Awards and nominations ==
Year	Award	Category	Work	Result	Ref.
1989	Jessie Richardson Theatre Award	Best actress	Toronto, Mississippi	Nominated	
1992	Elizabeth Sterling Haynes Award	Outstanding Actress in a Leading Role	Citadel	Nominated	
2000	Jessie Richardson theatre awards	Best actress	The Score	Nominated	
