= Halkett Bay Marine Provincial Park =

Provincial park in British Columbia, Canada

- IUCN category II (national park)
- Location within British Columbia
- Interactive map of Halkett Bay Marine Provincial Park
- Location: New Westminster Land District, British Columbia, Canada
- Nearest city: Vancouver, BC
- Coordinates: 49°27′29″N 123°19′49″W
- Area: 448 ha (1,110 acres)
- Established: June 16, 1988
- Governing body: BC Parks

Halkett Bay Marine Provincial Park is a provincial park off Gambier Island in British Columbia, Canada.
