= Mackenzie-class destroyer =

Canadian warship class (1965–1992)

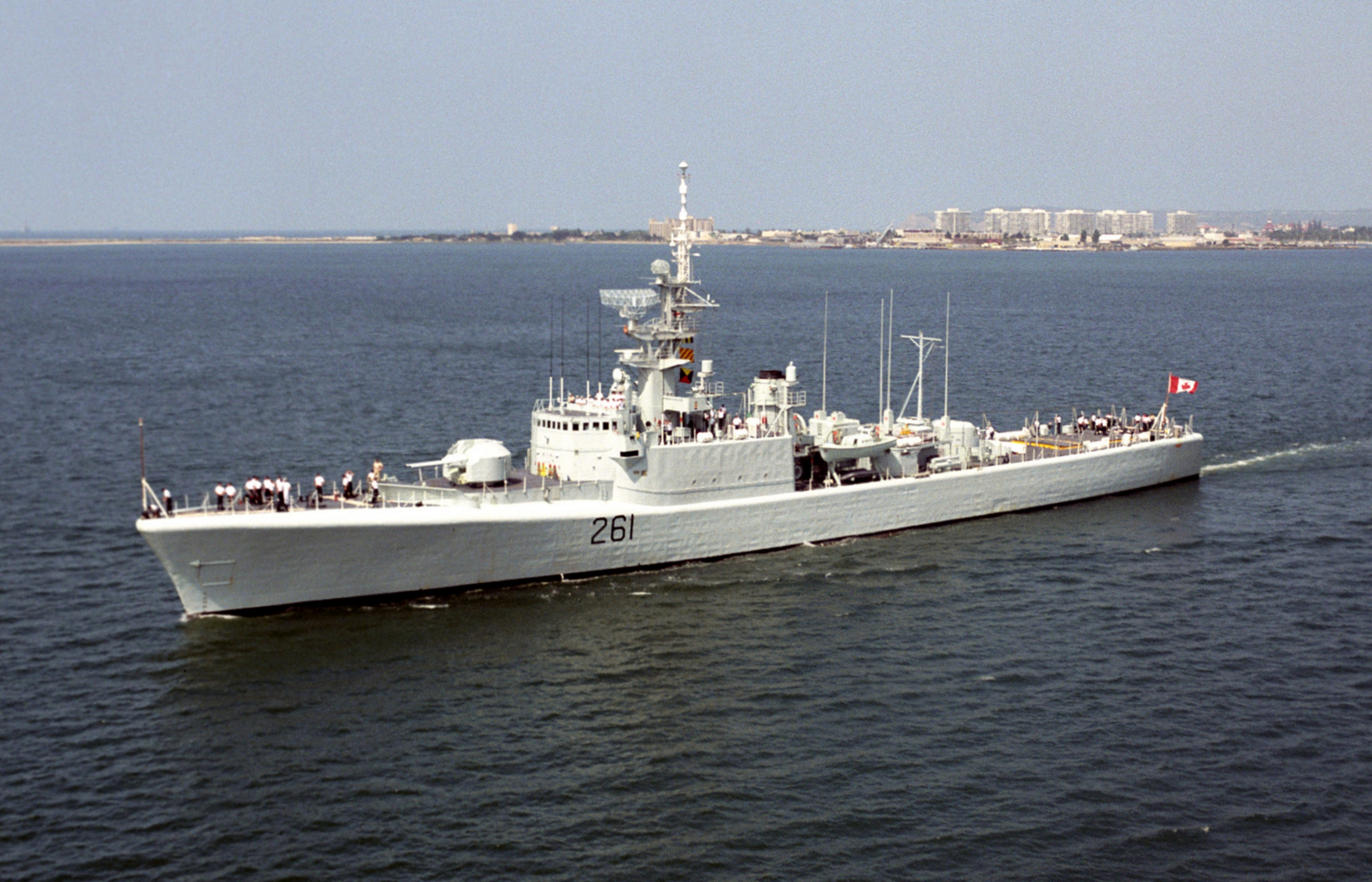
- HMCS Mackenzie off San Diego, in 1992

Class overview
- Name: Mackenzie class
- Builders: Canadian Vickers Ltd., Montreal; Victoria Machinery Depot Ltd., Victoria; Burrard Dry Dock Ltd., North Vancouver; Davie Shipbuilding Ltd., Lauzon
- Operators: Royal Canadian Navy; Canadian Forces
- Preceded by: Restigouche class
- Succeeded by: Annapolis class
- Built: 1958–1962
- In service: 1962–1992
- Planned: 6
- Completed: 4
- Cancelled: 2
- Retired: 4

General characteristics
- Type: Destroyer escort
- Displacement: 2,380 t (2,380.0 t) full load
- Length: 371 ft (113.1 m) wide load; 366 ft (111.6 m) oa
- Beam: 42 ft (12.8 m)
- Draught: 13 ft 6 in (4.1 m)
- Installed power: 2 × Babcock & Wilcox boilers; 30,000 shp (22,000 kW)
- Propulsion: 2 shafts; 2 × English-Electric geared steam turbines
- Speed: 28 kn (51.9 km/h; 32.2 mph)
- Complement: 228 regular, 170–210 training
- Sensors & processing systems: 1 × SPS-12 air search radar; 1 × SPS-10B surface search radar; 1 × Sperry Mk.2 navigation radar; 1 × SQS-501 high frequency bottom profiler sonar; 1 × SQS-502 high frequency mortar control sonar; 1 × SQS-503 hull mounted active search sonar; 1 × SQS-11 hull mounted active search sonar
- Electronic warfare & decoys: 1 × DAU (replaced by SRD 501) high frequency direction finder; 1 × WLR 1C radar analyzer; 1 × UPD 501 radar detector
- Armament: 1 × 3-inch/70 Mk.6 Vickers twin mount forward; (Qu'Appelle had 3-inch/50 twin); 1 × 3-inch/50 Mk.33 FMC twin mount aft; 2 × Mk NC 10 Limbo ASW mortars; 2 × single Mk.2 "K-gun" launchers with homing torpedoes; 1 × 103 mm Bofors illumination rocket launcher

The Mackenzie-class destroyer was a class of warship used by the Royal Canadian Navy and Canadian Forces from the 1960s–1990s. Six such ships were envisioned, of which four were completed to this specification. The last two hulls were completed to the post DDH conversion St. Laurent-class design (which included helicopter hangars); they were designated as the Annapolis class instead. The four Mackenzie-class destroyers spent most of their service in the Pacific Ocean, used primarily in a training role. Their only significant update was the DELEX (destroyer life extension) program, which was completed between 1982 and 1985 and updated their navigational radar and their sonar.

== Design and description ==
The initial design for what became known as the Mackenzie class was for an enlarged version of the St. Laurent class. Designed in 1957, they were to be 1,000 tonnes (980 long tons) heavier, 50 feet (15 m) longer and have engines that were 20,000 horsepower (15,000 kW) stronger than those installed in the St. Laurents. They would also have improved radar and sonar installed. Instead, budget issues forced a repeat of the previous Restigouche class, with changes intentionally minimized. Four ships were ordered in 1957, two more in 1958. However, costs for each of the ships rose to $28 million.

In 1959, the design of the final two ships of the class was altered to incorporate the changes made to the St. Laurent class. These two ships then became a separate class, known as the Annapolis class. The remaining four Mackenzies were essentially improved Restigouches, with improved habitability and better pre-wetting, bridge and weatherdeck fittings to better deal with extreme cold.

=== General characteristics ===
The ships measured 366 feet (112 m) in length, with a beam of 42 feet (13 m) and a draught of 13 feet 6 inches (4.11 m). The destroyer escorts displaced 2,380 tonnes (2,380 t) fully loaded and had a complement of 290. (Note: Macpherson and Barrie state the complement as 245 (12 officers and 233 enlisted))

The class was powered by two Babcock & Wilcox boilers connected to the two-shaft English-Electric geared steam turbines creating 30,000 shaft horsepower (22,000 kW). This gave the ships a maximum speed of 28 knots (52 km/h; 32 mph).

=== Armament ===
The most noticeable change for the Mackenzies was the replacement of the forward 3-inch (76 mm)/50 calibre Mk 22 guns (Note: Calibre denotes the length of the barrel. In this case, 50 caliber means that the gun barrel is 50 times as long as it is in diameter) with a dual Vickers 3-inch/70 calibre Mk 6 gun mount and the presence of a fire-control director atop the bridge superstructure. The bridge was raised one full deck higher than on previous classes in order to see over the new gun mount. However, the 3-inch/70 caliber guns were unavailable when Qu'Appelle was being constructed and 3-inch/50 calibre guns were installed instead in the forward mount.

The Vickers 3-inch/70 Mk.6 gun was developed by the Royal Navy and fitted to the Tiger-class cruiser, with the Royal Canadian Navy being the only other customer and used only on the Mackenzies and Restigouches. Each gun weighed 2,650 pounds (1,200 kg) and fired a projectile made up of a shell that weighed 15 pounds (6.8 kg) and a charge that weighed 11.21 pounds (5.08 kg) for a total weight of 26 pounds (12 kg). The guns had a muzzle velocity of 3,400 feet per second (1,000 m/s) and a ceiling of 38,000 feet (12,000 m). The guns had a rate of fire of 95–113 rounds per minute.

Two 3-inch/70 guns were placed in a Mark 6 mounting. The mounting could elevate to 90° with a 30°/sec elevation rate and a 60°/sec train rate. The guns were interchangeable with the American 3-inch/70 design, however the British mountings were considered superior.

The destroyers also had secondary armament of two American-produced 3-inch/50 calibre Mk.22 autoloading guns in a dual mount aft. The 3-inch/50s weighed 1,760 pounds (800 kg) each and fired a projectile that weighed 13 pounds (5.9 kg). The guns had a muzzle velocity of 2,700 feet per second (820 m/s) giving a maximum range of 14,600 yards (13,400 m) and an anti-aircraft ceiling of 30,400 feet (9,300 m). The guns could fire 45 – 50 rounds per minute with a barrel lifespan of 2,050 rounds.

The two 3-inch/50 guns were placed in a Mk 33 mount, allowing the guns to elevate from −15° to 85° and traverse 360° with an elevation rate of 30° per second and a train rate of 24° per second.

For anti-submarine warfare, the class was provided with two Mk 10 Limbo mortars. The Limbo was a British-designed three-barrel mortar capable of launching a projectile shell between 400–1,000 yards (370–910 m). Placed on stabilized mountings, the projectiles always entered the water at the same angle. The total weight of the shell was 390 pounds (180 kg). They also had two single Mk.2 "K-gun" launchers for their Mark 43 torpedoes. These torpedoes were installed in order to provide more distance in their attack on a submarine, with a range of 4,500 yards (4,100 m) at 15 knots (28 km/h; 17 mph), compared to the relatively close-in nature of the Limbo mortar.

=== Sensors ===
The Mackenzies were equipped with one SPS-12 air search radar, one SPS-10B surface search radar and one Sperry Mk.2 navigation radar. For detection below the surface, the ships had one SQS-501 high frequency bottom profiler sonar, one SQS-503 hull mounted active search sonar, one SQS-502 high frequency mortar control sonar and one SQS-11 hull mounted active search sonar.

=== DELEX refit ===
The DEstroyer Life EXtension (DELEX) refit was born out of the need to extend the life of the steam-powered destroyer escorts of the Canadian Navy in the 1980s until the next generation of surface ship was built. Encompassing all the classes based on the initial St. Laurent (the remaining St. Laurent, Restigouche, Mackenzie, and Annapolis-class vessels), the DELEX upgrades were meant to improve their ability to combat modern Soviet submarines, and to allow them to continue to operate as part of NATO task forces. All of the ships in the class had their refits performed at Esquimalt, British Columbia.

The DELEX refit for the Mackenzie class was the same for the Improved Restigouche-class vessels. This meant that the ships would receive the new tactical data system ADLIPS, new radars, new fire control and satellite navigation. They exchanged the SQS-503 sonar for the newer SQS-505 model. The sonar dome was installed on the hull and there were further modifications to the SPS-12 air search radar.

They also received two triple mounts for 12.75-inch (324 mm) torpedo tubes that would use the new Mk 46 homing torpedo. The Mark 46 torpedo had a range of 12,000 yards (11,000 m) at over 40 knots (74 km/h; 46 mph) with a high-explosive warhead weighing 96.8 pounds (43.9 kg). The tubes were sited on the quarterdeck, replacing the Limbo mortars.

== Ships ==
Ships	Number	Builder	Laid down	Launched	Commissioned	DELEX refit	Paid off	Fate
Mackenzie	261	Canadian Vickers, Montreal, Quebec	15 December 1958	25 May 1961	6 October 1962	1985	3 August 1993	Sold March 1995 to Artificial Reef Society of British Columbia. Scuttled off Sidney, British Columbia, on 16 September 1995.
Saskatchewan	262	Victoria Machinery Depot Ltd., Victoria, British Columbia	29 October 1959	1 February 1961	16 February 1963	1984	28 March 1994	Sold 1997 to Artificial Reef Society of British Columbia. Scuttled off Nanaimo, British Columbia, on 14 June 1997.
Yukon	263	Burrard Dry Dock Ltd., North Vancouver, British Columbia	25 October 1959	27 July 1961	25 May 1963	1983	3 December 1993	Scuttled off San Diego, California, in 2000.
Qu'Appelle	264	Davie Shipbuilding Ltd., Lauzon, Quebec	14 January 1960	2 May 1962	14 September 1963	1982	31 July 1992	Scrapped

== Service history ==
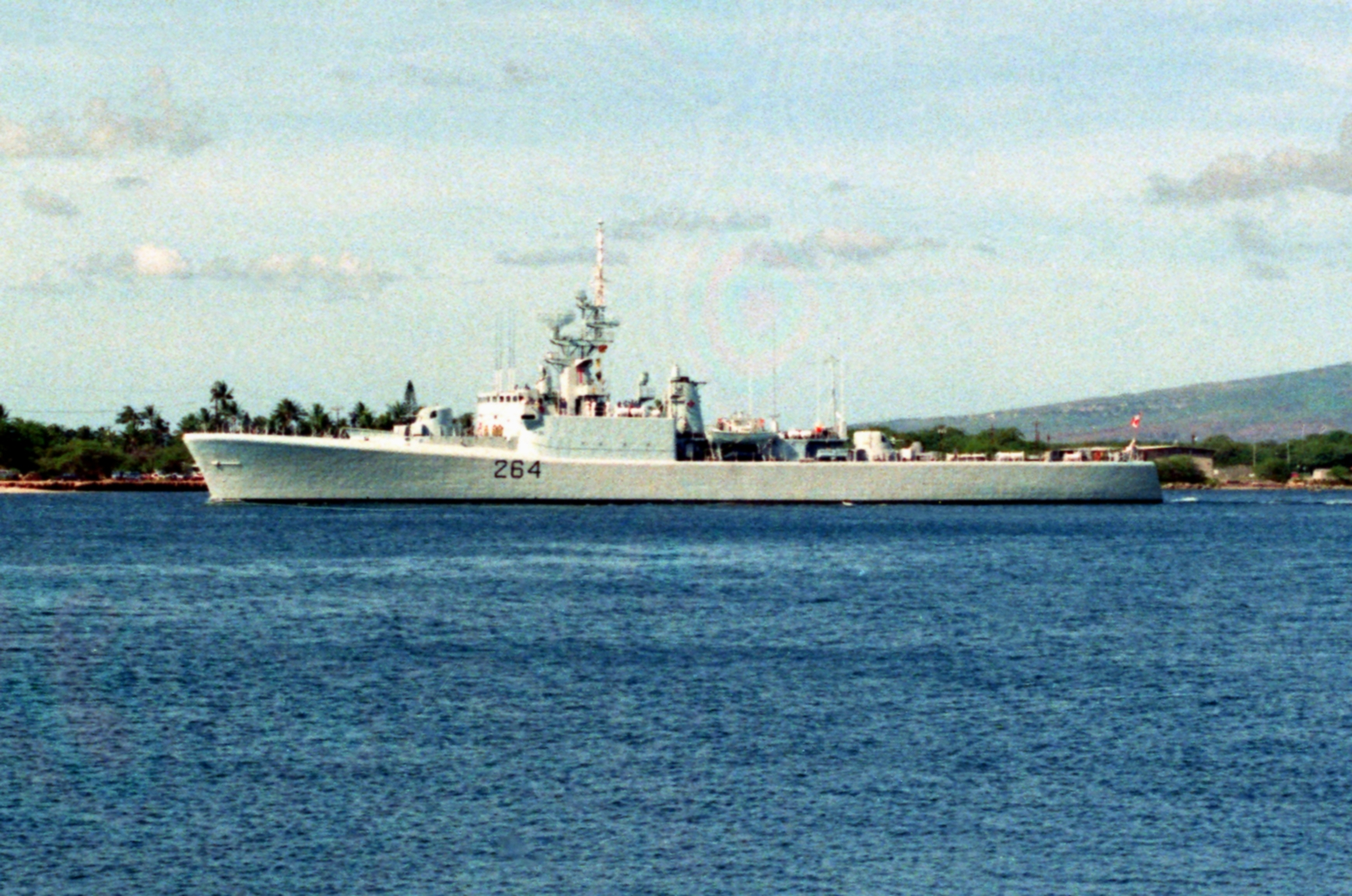
Qu'Appelle at Pearl Harbor in 1990

All four ships in the class were ordered from different shipyards. Mackenzie was laid down by Canadian Vickers of Montreal on 15 December 1958, followed by Yukon on 25 October 1959 by Burrard Dry Dock of Vancouver, Saskatchewan on 29 October 1959 by Victoria Machinery Depot Co. of Victoria, British Columbia, and Qu'Appelle from Davie Shipbuilding of Lauzon, Quebec, on 14 January 1960. They commissioned in a different order, beginning with Mackenzie on 6 October 1962, Saskatchewan on 16 February 1963, Yukon on 25 May 1963 and Qu'Appelle on 14 September 1963.

Mackenzie spent the better part of her service life on the west coast of Canada, with the exception of her first year based at Halifax. Mackenzie had an uneventful career, spending most of her time as a training ship or performing general duties, such as port visits and naval exercises. She underwent her DELEX refit in 1985. The ship was paid off on 3 August 1993 and sunk as an artificial reef off Rum Island, near Sidney, British Columbia.

Saskatchewan was initially based on the east coast out of Halifax for a couple of months, then transferred to the west coast. In February 1970, she transferred back east and acted as the flagship for STANAVFORLANT, the standing NATO fleet during the Cold War. Once again, Saskatchewan transferred back to the west in 1973. The ship underwent her DELEX refit from 1985–86 and spent the rest of her career acting as a training ship. The ship was paid off on 1 April 1994 was scuttled as an artificial reef off Nanaimo, British Columbia.

Yukon had an uneventful career. She spent the majority of her career acting as a training ship and performing general fleet duties, such as port visits. The ship underwent her DELEX refit from 1984–85. The destroyer escort was paid off on 3 December 1993 and was sold to the San Diego Oceans Foundation who intended to scuttle the ship off San Diego, California, as an artificial reef. However, before the ceremonial scuttling could take place, ex-Yukon flooded in bad weather and sank the day before at the site. As of December 2012, five people have died while diving on Yukon's wreck.

Qu'Appelle also had an uneventful career, used primarily as a training ship and for general fleet duties. She underwent her DELEX refit from 1983–84. She was paid off on 31 July 1992 and sold in 1994 to a Chinese firm for breaking up.

The four Mackenzies were relegated to training duties due to their lack of Variable Depth Sonar, helicopters and lack of modernization. They were replaced in service by the Halifax-class frigates.

== See also ==
Equivalent destroyers of the same era

- Friesland class
- Yamagumo class
- Forrest Sherman class
- Daring class
- Kotlin class
