= HMCS Saskatchewan (DDE 262) =

Mackenzie-class destroyer of the Royal Canadian Navy

Coordinates: 49°12.96′N 123°53.070′W

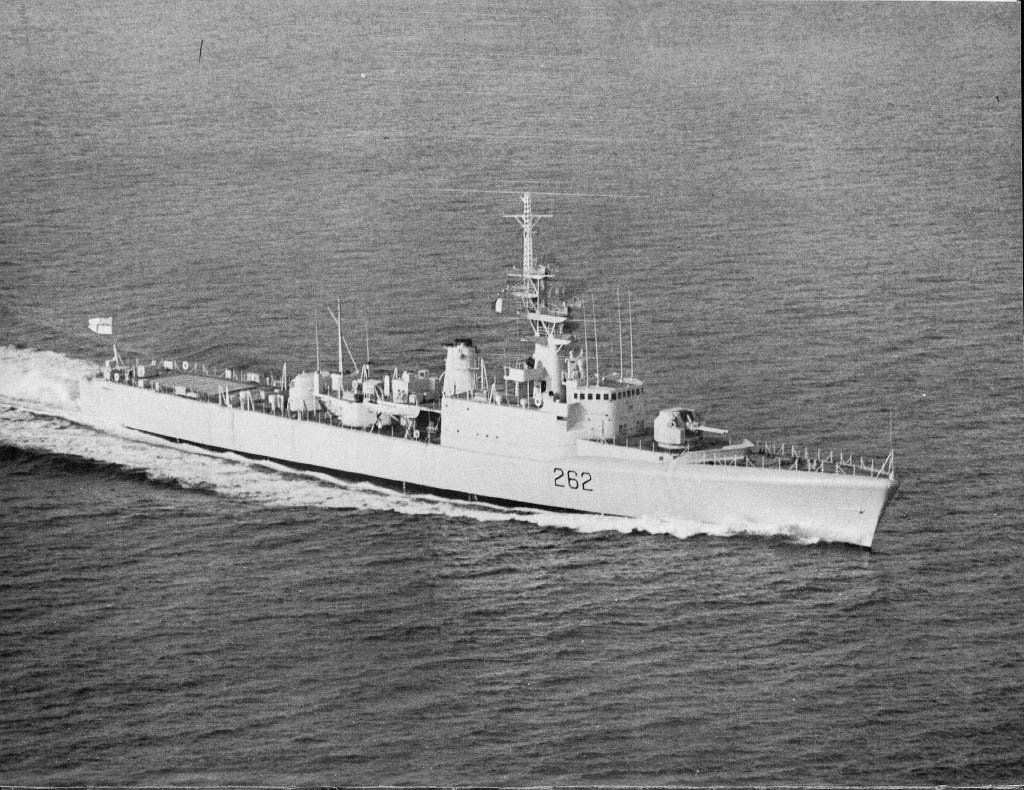
- HMCS Saskatchewan in 1963

History

Canada
- Name: Saskatchewan
- Namesake: Saskatchewan River
- Ordered: 1957
- Builder: Victoria Machinery Depot, Victoria
- Laid down: 29 October 1959
- Launched: 1 February 1961
- Commissioned: 16 February 1963
- Decommissioned: 28 March 1994
- Refit: 1985–86 (DELEX)
- Identification: DDE 262
- Motto: "Ready and confident"
- Honours and awards: Atlantic 1943–44, Normandy 1944, Biscay 1944
- Fate: Sold in 1997 to the Artificial Reef Society of British Columbia Scuttled off Nanaimo on 14 June 1997.
- Badge: Vert, a bend wavy argent charged with a like bendlet gules, and over all a garb, or

General characteristics
- Class & type: Mackenzie-class destroyer
- Displacement: 2,880 t (2,830 long tons) full load
- Length: 366 ft (111.6 m)
- Beam: 42 ft (12.8 m)
- Draught: 13 ft 6 in (4.1 m)
- Installed power: 2 × Babcock & Wilcox boilers; 30,000 shp (22,000 kW)
- Propulsion: 2 shafts; 2 × English-Electric geared steam turbines
- Speed: 28 kn (51.9 km/h; 32.2 mph)
- Complement: 228 regular, 170–210 training
- Sensors & processing systems: 1 × SPS-12 air search radar; 1 × SPS-10B surface search radar; 1 × Sperry Mk.2 navigation radar; 1 × SQS-501 high frequency bottom profiler sonar; 1 × SQS-502 high frequency mortar control sonar; 1 × SQS-503 hull mounted active search sonar; 1 × SQS-11 hull mounted active search sonar
- Electronic warfare & decoys: 1 × DAU (replaced by SRD 501) high frequency direction finder; 1 × WLR 1C radar analyzer; 1 × UPD 501 radar detector
- Armament: 1 × 3-inch/70 Mk.6 Vickers twin mount forward; 1 × 3-inch/50 Mk.33 FMC twin mount aft; 2 × Mk NC 10 Limbo ASW mortars; 2 × single Mk.2 "K-gun" launchers with homing torpedoes; 1 × 103 mm Bofors illumination rocket launcher

HMCS Saskatchewan was a Mackenzie-class destroyer that served in the Royal Canadian Navy (RCN) and later the Canadian Forces. She was the second Canadian naval unit to bear the name HMCS Saskatchewan. The ship was named for the Saskatchewan River which runs from Saskatchewan to Manitoba in Canada.

Entering service in 1963, she was mainly used as a training ship on the west coast. She was decommissioned in 1994 and sold for use as an artificial reef. She was sunk as such in June 1997 off British Columbia.

== Design ==
The Mackenzie class was an offshoot of the St. Laurent-class design. Initially planned to be an improved version of the design, budget difficulties led to the Canadian government ordering a repeat of the previous Restigouche class, with improved habitability and better pre-wetting, bridge and weatherdeck fittings to better deal with extreme cold. The original intention was to give the Mackenzie class variable depth sonar during construction, but would have led to delays of up to a year in construction time, which the navy could not accept.

=== General characteristics ===
The Mackenzie-class vessels measured 366 feet (112 m) in length, with a beam of 42 feet (13 m) and a draught of 13 feet 6 inches (4.11 m). The Mackenzies displaced 2,880 tonnes (2,830 long tons) fully loaded and had a complement of 290. (Note: Macpherson and Barrie state the complement as 245 (12 officers and 233 enlisted))

The class was powered by two Babcock & Wilcox boilers connected to the two-shaft English-Electric geared steam turbines providing 30,000 shaft horsepower (22,000 kW). This gave the ships a maximum speed of 28 knots (52 km/h; 32 mph).

=== Armament ===
The most noticeable change for the Mackenzies was the replacement of the forward 3-inch (76 mm)/50 calibre Mk 22 guns of the St. Laurent design (Note: Caliber denotes the length of the barrel. In this case, 50 caliber means that the gun barrel is 50 times as long as it is in diameter) with a dual Vickers 3-inch/70 calibre Mk 6 gun mount and the presence of a fire-control director atop the bridge superstructure. The bridge was raised one full deck higher than on previous classes in order to see over the new gun mount. The class did retain the rear dual 3-inch/50 calibre gun mount and for anti-submarine warfare, the class was provided with two Mk 10 Limbo mortars. The ships were initially fitted with Mark 43 torpedoes to supplement their anti-submarine capability, but were quickly upgraded to the Mark 44 launched from a modified depth charge thrower. This was to give the destroyers the ability to combat submarines from a distance.

=== Sensors ===
The Mackenzie class were equipped with one SPS-12 air search radar, one SPS-10B surface search radar and one Sperry Mk.2 navigation radar. For detection below the surface, the ships had one SQS-501 high frequency bottom profiler sonar, one SQS-503 hull mounted active search sonar, one SQS-502 high frequency mortar control sonar and one SQS-11 hull mounted active search sonar.

=== DELEX refit ===
The DEstroyer Life EXtension (DELEX) refit was born out of the need to extend the life of the steam-powered destroyer escorts of the Canadian Navy in the 1980s until the next generation of surface ship was built. Encompassing all the classes based on the initial St. Laurent (the remaining St. Laurent, Restigouche, Mackenzie, and Annapolis-class vessels), the DELEX upgrades were meant to improve their ability to combat modern Soviet submarines, and to allow them to continue to operate as part of NATO task forces.

The DELEX refit for the Mackenzie class was the same for the Improved Restigouche-class vessels. This meant that the ships would receive the new tactical data system ADLIPS, new radars, new fire control and satellite navigation. They exchanged the SQS-503 sonar for the newer SQS-505 model.

They also received a triple mount for 12.75-inch (324 mm) torpedo tubes that would use the new Mk 46 homing torpedo. The Mark 46 torpedo had a range of 12,000 yards (11,000 m) at over 40 knots (74 km/h; 46 mph) with a high-explosive warhead weighing 96.8 pounds (43.9 kg).

== Construction and career ==
Saskatchewan was ordered in 1957 and was laid down on 29 October 1959 at Victoria Machinery Depot Ltd., Victoria. The ship was launched on 1 February 1961. The ship was supposed to be launched on 31 January, but poor weather forced the delay. In September 1961 she was moved to Yarrows Shipyard at Esquimalt, British Columbia for completion. She was commissioned into the RCN on 16 February 1963 with the classification number DDE 262.

Saskatchewan originally deployed to the east coast, operating out of Halifax. In April 1963, while transiting to the Pacific, Saskatchewan was deployed off Haiti as part of an international force monitoring an insurrection against the sitting president, François Duvalier. In October 1963, she transferred to the Pacific. On 8 September 1968, the ship ran aground in the Gulf of Georgia. The captain was later found guilty of negligence by a court-martial on the matter. The destroyer returned to the east coast in February 1970, when she relieved HMCS Nipigon as flagship of STANAVFORLANT, the standing fleet of NATO.

In 1973, Saskatchewan returned to the west coast and remained there for the rest of her career, with both the RCN and later the Canadian Forces's Maritime Forces Pacific, largely as a training ship. In July 1982, the destroyer was sent to track the Soviet spy ship Aavril Sarychev which had been monitoring the North American west coast. She underwent the DELEX refit at the Burrard Yarrow Shipyard in Esquimalt from 27 May 1985 to 17 June 1986. In Fall 1986, she was among the Canadian warships sent to Australia to participate in the 75th anniversary celebrations of the Royal Australian Navy. The ship remained a training ship as part of Training Group Pacific until she was paid off by on 1 April 1994.

Saskatchewan's hulk was purchased by the Artificial Reef Society of British Columbia in 1997 and she was scuttled off Nanaimo on 14 June 1997 as an artificial reef.
