= HMAS Parramatta (FFH 154) =

Anzac-class frigate of the Royal Australian Navy

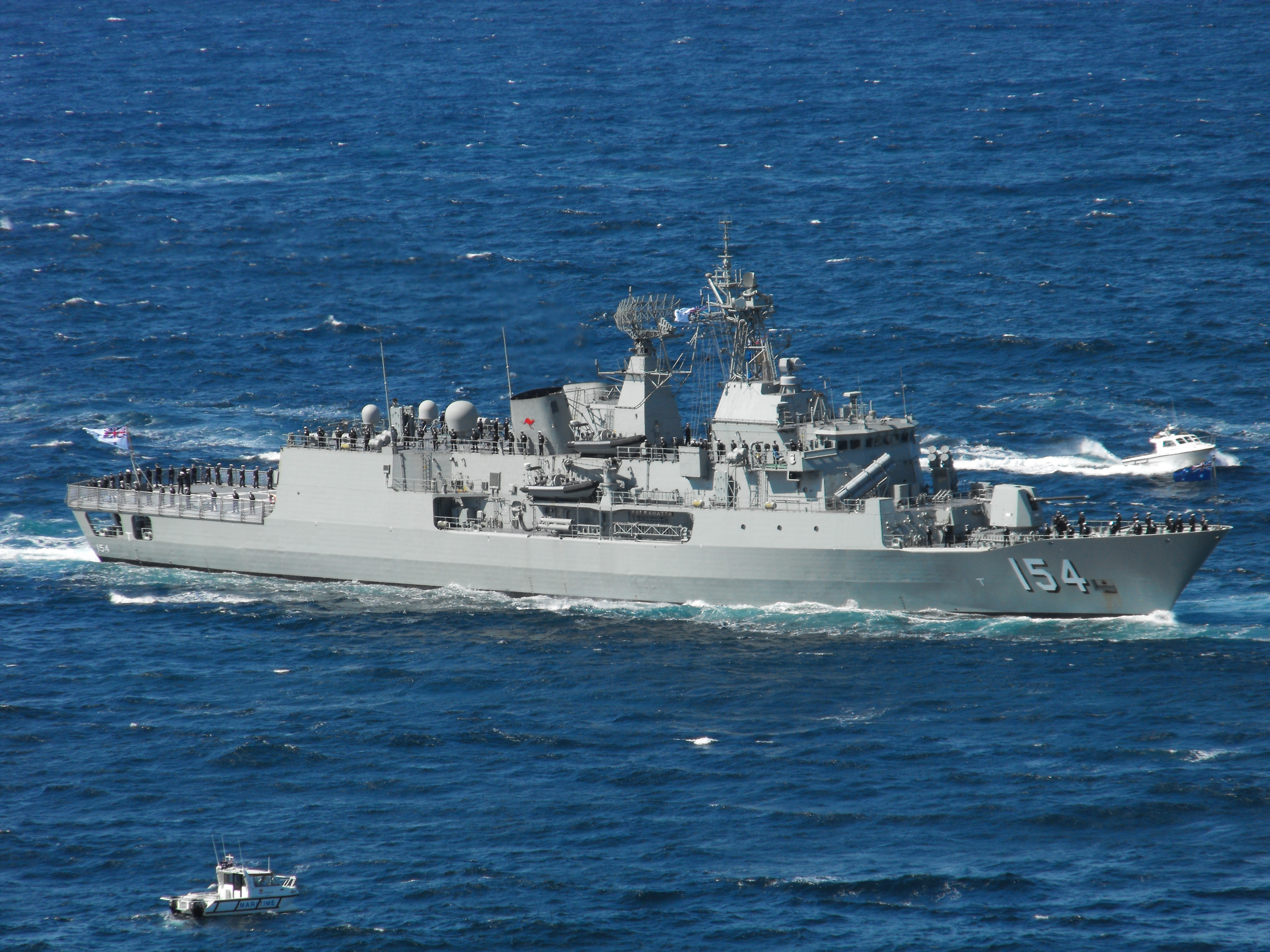
- HMAS Parramatta in 2013

History

Australia
- Namesake: Parramatta River
- Builder: Tenix Defence
- Laid down: 5 June 1999
- Launched: 17 June 2000
- Commissioned: 4 October 2003
- Home port: Fleet Base East
- Identification: MMSI number: 503113000
- Motto: "Strike Deep"
- Honours and awards: Meritorious Unit Citation; Four inherited battle honours
- Status: Active as of 2019
- Badge

General characteristics
- Class & type: Anzac-class frigate
- Displacement: 3,600 tonnes full load
- Length: 118 m (387 ft)
- Beam: 15 m (49 ft)
- Draught: 4 m (13 ft)
- Propulsion: 1 × General Electric LM 2500 gas turbine providing 30,000 hp (22.5 MW); 2 × MTU 12v 1163 TB83 diesels providing 8,840 hp (6.5 MW)
- Speed: 27 knots (50 km/h; 31 mph)
- Range: 6,000 nautical miles (11,000 km; 6,900 mi) at 18 knots (33 km/h; 21 mph)
- Complement: approximately 170 sailors
- Sensors & processing systems: Sonars: Thomson Sintra Spherion B Mod 5; hull-mounted; active search and attack; medium frequency. Provision for towed array; Air search radar: Raytheon AN/SPS-49(V)8 ANZ (C/D-band); Surface search radar: CelsiusTech 9LV 453 TIR (Ericsson Tx/Rx) (G-band); Navigation: Atlas Elektronik 9600 ARPA (I-band)
- Electronic warfare & decoys: ESM: Racal modified Sceptre A (radar intercept), Telefunken PST-1720 Telegon 10 (comms intercept); Countermeasures: Decoys: G & D Aircraft SRBOC Mk 36 Mod 1 decoy launchers for SRBOC
- Armament: Guns and missiles: 1 × 5 in/54 (127 mm) Mk 45 Mod 2 gun, various machine guns and small arms, 2 × 4 Harpoon anti-ship missiles, Mk 41 Mod 5 VLS for Sea Sparrow and Evolved Sea Sparrow; Torpedoes: 2 × triple 324 mm Mk 32 Mod 5 tubes; Fire control: CelsiusTech 9LV 453 (J-band); Combat data systems: CelsiusTech 9LV 453 Mk 3.Link 11; Weapons control: CelsiusTech 9LV 453 optronic director with Raytheon CW Mk 73 Mod 1
- Aircraft carried: 1 × Sikorsky MH-60R Seahawk

HMAS Parramatta (FFH 154) is an Anzac-class frigate of the Royal Australian Navy (RAN). One of ten warships built for the RAN and Royal New Zealand Navy (RNZN) based on the MEKO 200 design, Parramatta was laid down in 1999, launched in 2003, and commissioned into the RAN in 2003. During her career, the frigate has been deployed to the Middle East on several occasions. In early 2015, Parramatta was docked to undergo the Anti-Ship Missile Defence (ASMD) upgrade. She completed these upgrades in April 2016.

== Design and construction ==
The Anzac class originated from RAN plans to replace the six River-class destroyer escorts with a mid-capability patrol frigate. The Australian shipbuilding industry was thought to be incapable of warship design, so the RAN decided to take a proven foreign design and modify it. Around the same time, the Royal New Zealand Navy (RNZN) was looking to replace four Leander-class frigates; a deterioration in New Zealand-United States relations, the need to improve alliances with nearby nations, and the commonalities between the RAN and RNZN ships' requirements led the two nations to begin collaborating on the acquisition in 1987. Tenders were requested by the Anzac Ship Project at the end of 1986, with 12 ship designs (including an airship) submitted. By August 1987, the tenders were narrowed down in October to Blohm + Voss's MEKO 200 design, the M class (later Karel Doorman class) offered by Royal Schelde, and a scaled-down Type 23 frigate proposed by Yarrow Shipbuilders. In 1989, the Australian government announced that Melbourne-based shipbuilder AMECON (which became Tenix Defence) would build the modified MEKO 200 design. The Australians ordered eight ships, while New Zealand ordered two, with an unexercised option for two more.

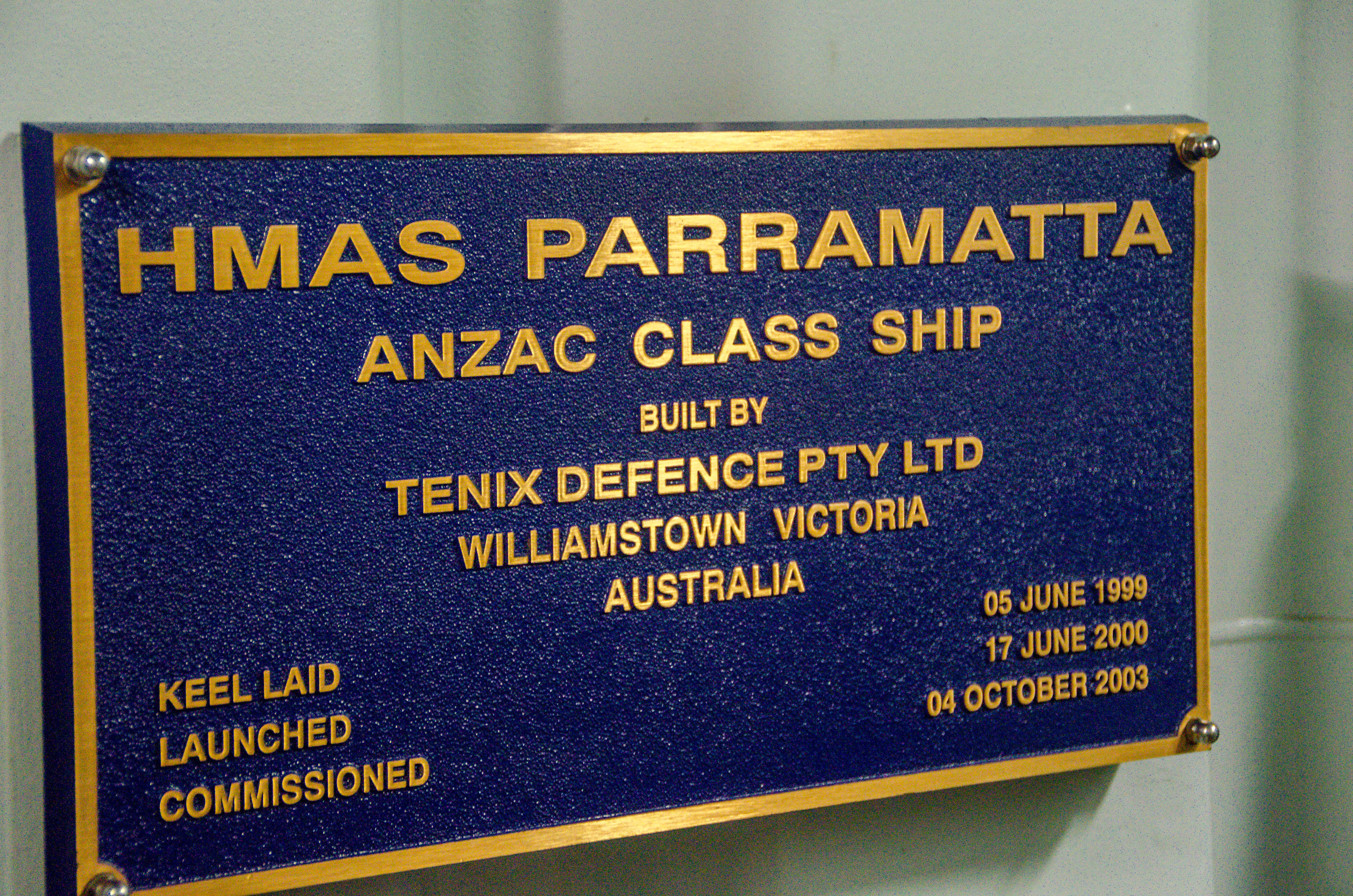
Parramatta's makers plate

The Anzacs are based on Blohm + Voss' MEKO 200 PN (or Vasco da Gama-class) frigates, modified to meet Australian and New Zealand specifications and maximise the use of locally built equipment. Each frigate has a 3,600-tonne (3,500-long-ton; 4,000-short-ton) full load displacement. The ships are 109 metres (358 ft) long at the waterline, and 118 metres (387 ft) long overall, with a beam of 14.8 metres (49 ft), and a full load draught of 4.35 metres (14.3 ft). A Combined Diesel or Gas (CODOG) propulsion machinery layout is used, with a single, 30,172-horsepower (22,499 kW) General Electric LM2500-30 gas turbine and two 8,840-horsepower (6,590 kW) MTU 12V1163 TB83 diesel engines driving the ship's two controllable-pitch propellers. Maximum speed is 27 knots (50 km/h; 31 mph), and maximum range is over 6,000 nautical miles (11,000 km; 6,900 mi) at 18 knots (33 km/h; 21 mph); about 50% greater than other MEKO 200 designs. The standard ship's company of an Anzac consists of 22 officers and 141 sailors.

As designed, the main armament for the frigate is a 5-inch 54 calibre Mark 45 gun, supplemented by an eight-cell Mark 41 vertical launch system (for RIM-7 Sea Sparrow or RIM-162 Evolved Sea Sparrow missiles), two 12.7-millimetre (0.50 in) machine guns, and two Mark 32 triple torpedo tube sets (initially firing Mark 46 torpedoes, but later upgraded to use the MU90 Impact torpedo). They were also designed for but not with a Mark 15 Phalanx close-in weapons system (two Mini Typhoons fitted when required from 2005 onwards), two quad-canister Harpoon anti-ship missile launchers (which were installed across the RAN vessels from 2005 onwards), and a second 8-cell Mark 41 VLS (which has not been added). The Australian Anzacs used a single Sikorsky S-70B-2 Seahawk helicopter; plans to replace them with Kaman SH-2G Super Seasprites were cancelled in 2008 due to ongoing problems. Instead, the S-70B-2 was replaced with the Sikorsky MH-60R Seahawk by late 2017.

Parramatta was laid down at Williamstown, Victoria on 24 April 1999. The ship was assembled from six hull modules and six superstructure modules; the superstructure modules were fabricated in Whangarei, New Zealand, and hull modules were built at both Williamstown and Newcastle, New South Wales, with final integration at Williamstown. She was launched on 17 June 2000. Parramatta was commissioned into the RAN on 4 October 2003.

== Operational history ==
In 2005, Parramatta was sent for six months service in the Persian Gulf as part of Operation Catalyst, returning to Sydney on 13 April 2006. Parramatta and HMAS Newcastle were the first RAN ships to be fitted with two M2HB .50 calibre machine guns in Mini Typhoon mounts; now a standard theatre fit for all RAN frigates deployed to the Persian Gulf. During the deployment period, her crew carried out 186 vessel boardings and security patrols, and were involved in training other vessels in the Iraq Coalition. Parramatta was awarded the Meritorious Unit Citation in 2007 for her efforts and conduct during this deployment.

In December 2011, while deployed to the Middle East, Parramatta provided fuel and food to an Iranian dhow that was adrift off Yemen.

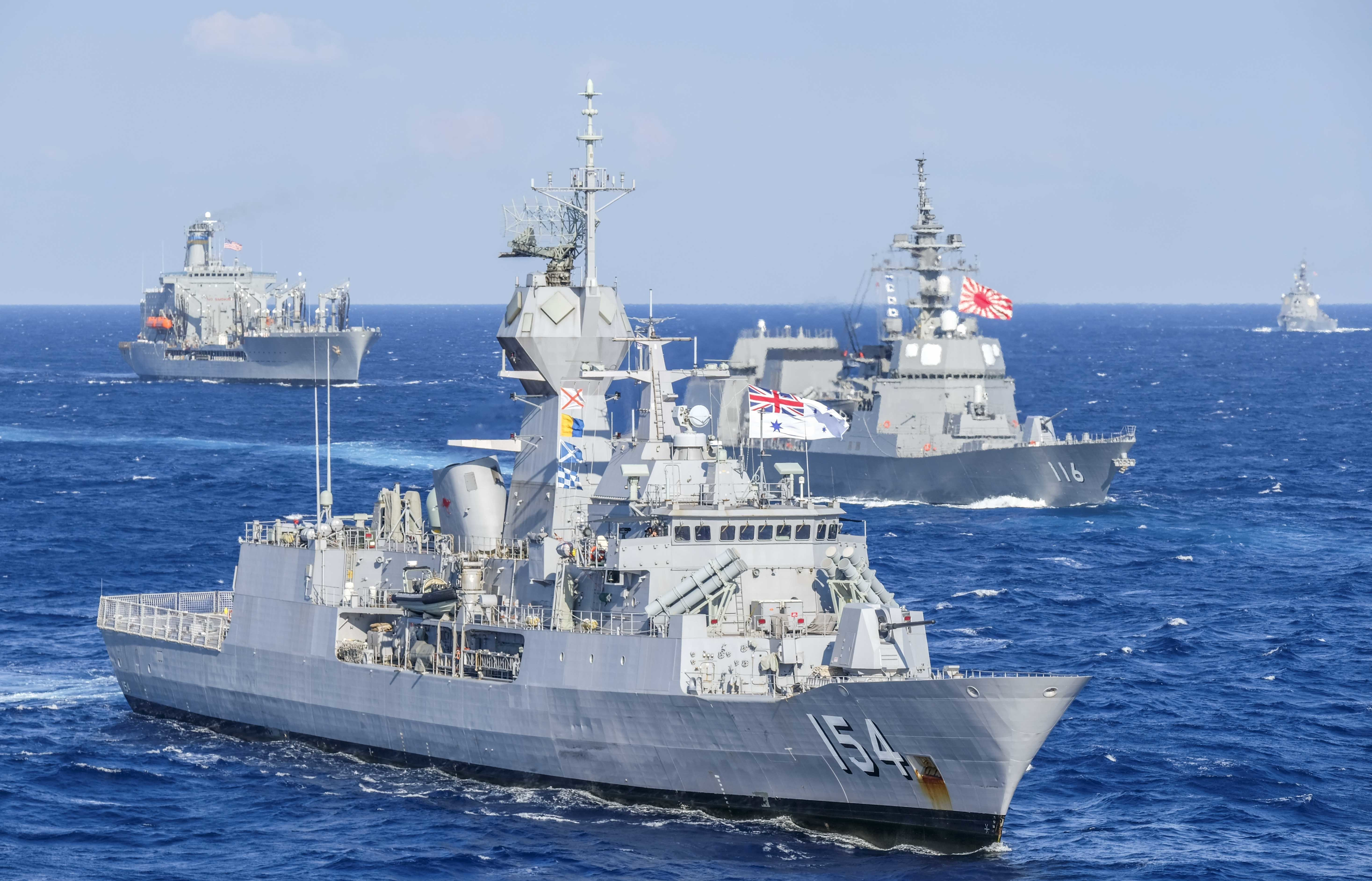
HMAS Parramatta sailing in formation with Japanese and US ships in 2019

In October 2013, Parramatta participated in the International Fleet Review 2013 in Sydney.

In November 2014, Parramatta and sister ship Stuart were deployed to shadow a Russian naval force operating in international waters off Australia during the 2014 G-20 Brisbane summit. The Russian deployment was believed to be in response to troubled recent relationships between the two nations.

Parramatta was docked in March 2015 to undergo the Anti-Ship Missile Defence (ASMD) upgrade. The upgrade will include the fitting of CEA Technologies' CEAFAR and CEAMOUNT phased array radars on new masts, a Vampir NG Infrared Search and Track system, and Sharpeye Navigational Radar Systems, along with improvements to the operations room equipment and layout. The upgrade was completed in April 2016 and she rejoined the fleet in July.

During late 2019 the frigate took part in efforts to enforce sanctions against North Korea as part of Operation Argos.
