= HMAS Stuart (FFH 153) =

Anzac-class frigate of the Royal Australian Navy

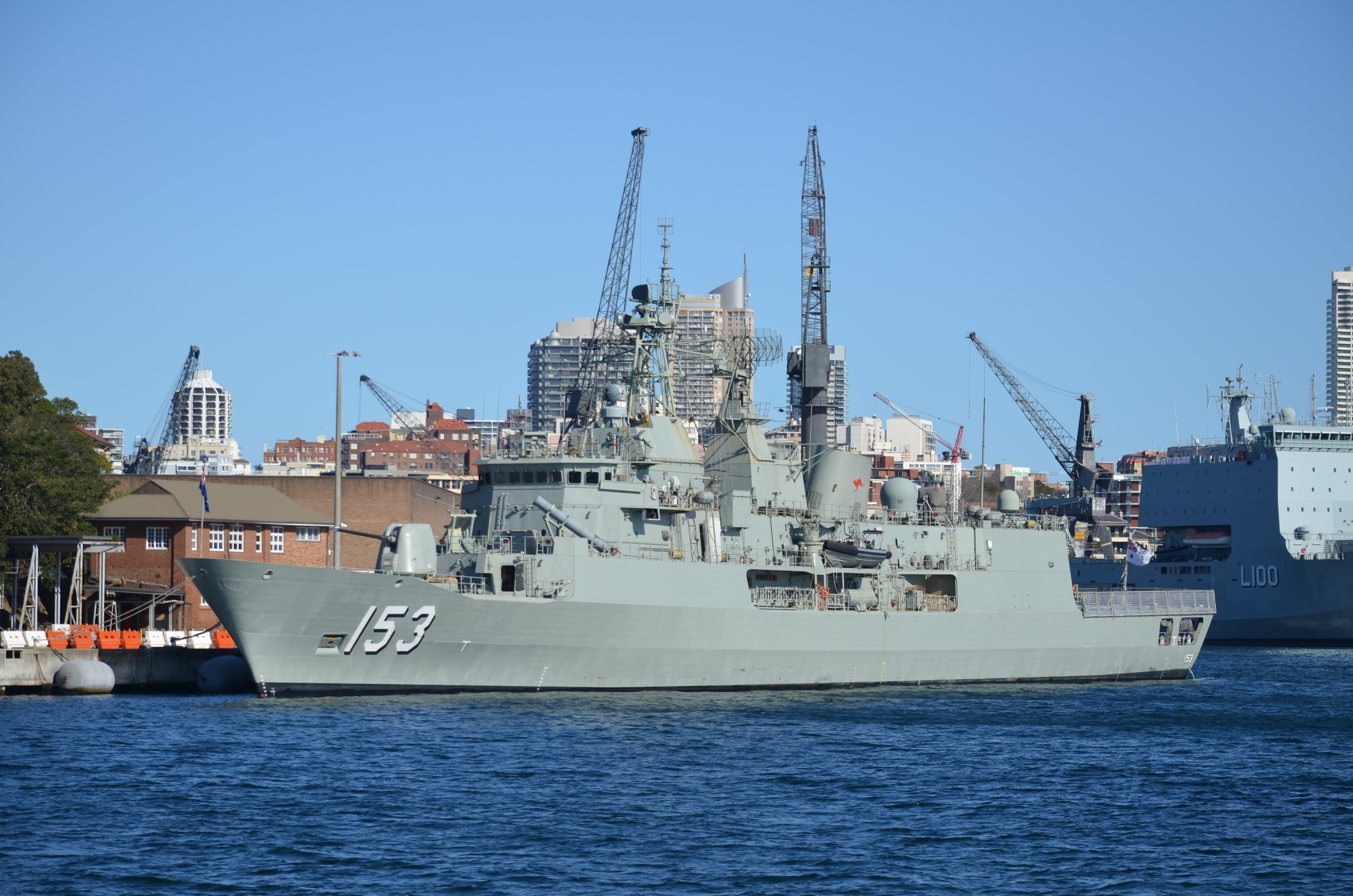
- HMAS Stuart in 2014

History

Australia
- Builder: Tenix Defence
- Laid down: 25 July 1998
- Launched: 17 April 1999
- Commissioned: 17 August 2002
- Home port: Fleet Base West
- Motto: "Always Prepared"
- Nickname(s): "The Tartan Terror"
- Honours and awards: Eight inherited battle honours
- Status: Active as of 2023
- Badge

General characteristics
- Class & type: Anzac-class frigate
- Displacement: 3,600 tonnes full load
- Length: 118 m (387 ft)
- Beam: 15 m (49 ft)
- Draught: 4 m (13 ft)
- Propulsion: 1 × General Electric LM 2500 gas turbine providing 30,000 hp (22.5 mW); 2 × MTU 12v 1163 TB83 diesels providing 8,840 hp (6.5 mW)
- Speed: 27 knots (50 km/h; 31 mph)
- Range: 6,000 nautical miles (11,000 km; 6,900 mi) at 18 knots (33 km/h; 21 mph)
- Complement: approximately 170 sailors
- Sensors & processing systems: Sonars: Thomson Sintra Spherion B Mod 5; hull-mounted; active search and attack; medium frequency. Provision for towed array; Air search radar: Raytheon AN/SPS-49(V)8 ANZ (C/D-band); Surface search radar: CelsiusTech 9LV 453 TIR (Ericsson Tx/Rx) (G-band); Navigation: Atlas Elektronik 9600 ARPA (I-band)
- Electronic warfare & decoys: ESM: Racal modified Sceptre A (radar intercept), Telefunken PST-1720 Telegon 10 (comms intercept); Countermeasures: Decoys: G & D Aircraft SRBOC Mk 36 Mod 1 decoy launchers for SRBOC
- Armament: Guns and missiles: 1 × 5 in/54 (127 mm) Mk 45 Mod 2 gun, various machine guns and small arms, 2 × 4 Harpoon anti-ship missiles, Mk 41 Mod 5 VLS for Sea Sparrow and Evolved Sea Sparrow; Torpedoes: 2 × triple 324 mm Mk 32 Mod 5 tubes; Fire control: CelsiusTech 9LV 453 (J-band); Combat data systems: CelsiusTech 9LV 453 Mk 3.Link 11; Weapons control: CelsiusTech 9LV 453 optronic director with Raytheon CW Mk 73 Mod 1
- Aircraft carried: 1 × Sikorsky MH-60R Seahawk

HMAS Stuart (FFH 153) is an Anzac-class frigate of the Royal Australian Navy (RAN). She was built at Williamstown in Victoria, and commissioned into the RAN in 2002. The frigate is operational as of 2025.

== Design and construction ==
The Anzac class originated from RAN plans to replace the six River-class destroyer escorts with a mid-capability patrol frigate. The Australian shipbuilding industry was thought to be incapable of warship design, so the RAN decided to take a proven foreign design and modify it. Around the same time, the Royal New Zealand Navy (RNZN) was looking to replace four Leander-class frigates; a deterioration in New Zealand-United States relations, the need to improve alliances with nearby nations, and the commonalities between the RAN and RNZN ships' requirements led the two nations to begin collaborating on the acquisition in 1987. Tenders were requested by the Anzac Ship Project at the end of 1986, with 12 ship designs (including an airship) submitted. By August 1987, the tenders were narrowed down in October to Blohm + Voss's MEKO 200 design, the M class (later Karel Doorman class) offered by Royal Schelde, and a scaled-down Type 23 frigate proposed by Yarrow Shipbuilders. In 1989, the Australian government announced that Melbourne-based shipbuilder AMECON (which became Tenix Defence) would build the modified MEKO 200 design. The Australians ordered eight ships, while New Zealand ordered two, with an unexercised option for two more.

The Anzacs are based on Blohm + Voss' MEKO 200 PN (or Vasco da Gama-class) frigates, modified to meet Australian and New Zealand specifications and maximise the use of locally built equipment. Each frigate has a 3,600-tonne (3,500-long-ton; 4,000-short-ton) full load displacement. The ships are 109 metres (358 ft) long at the waterline, and 118 metres (387 ft) long overall, with a beam of 14.8 metres (49 ft), and a full load draught of 4.35 metres (14.3 ft). A Combined Diesel or Gas (CODOG) propulsion machinery layout is used, with a single, 30,172-horsepower (22,499 kW) General Electric LM2500-30 gas turbine and two 8,840-horsepower (6,590 kW) MTU 12V1163 TB83 diesel engines driving the ship's two controllable-pitch propellers. Maximum speed is 27 knots (50 km/h; 31 mph), and maximum range is over 6,000 nautical miles (11,000 km; 6,900 mi) at 18 knots (33 km/h; 21 mph); about 50% greater than other MEKO 200 designs. The standard ship's company of an Anzac consists of 22 officers and 141 sailors.

As designed, the main armament for the frigate is a 5-inch 54 calibre Mark 45 gun, supplemented by an eight-cell Mark 41 vertical launch system (for RIM-7 Sea Sparrow or RIM-162 Evolved Sea Sparrow missiles), two 12.7-millimetre (0.50 in) machine guns, and two Mark 32 triple torpedo tube sets (initially firing Mark 46 torpedoes, but later upgraded to use the MU90 Impact torpedo). They were also designed for but not with a Mark 15 Phalanx close-in weapons system (two Mini Typhoons fitted when required from 2005 onwards), two quad-canister Harpoon anti-ship missile launchers (which were installed across the RAN vessels from 2005 onwards), and a second 8-cell Mark 41 VLS (which has not been added). The Australian Anzacs used a single Sikorsky S-70B-2 Seahawk helicopter; plans to replace them with Kaman SH-2G Super Seasprites were cancelled in 2008 due to ongoing problems. Instead, the S-70B-2 was replaced with the Sikorsky MH-60R Seahawk by late 2017.

Stuart was laid down at Williamstown, Victoria on 25 July 1998. The ship was assembled from six hull modules and six superstructure modules; the superstructure modules were fabricated in Whangarei, New Zealand, and hull modules were built at both Williamstown and Newcastle, New South Wales, with final integration at Williamstown. She was launched on 17 April 1999 by the wife of Admiral Chris Barrie, the Chief of the Defence Force, and commissioned into the RAN on 17 August 2002.

== Operational history ==
In April 2003, Stuart was used to capture Pong Su, a North Korean-owned freighter involved in drug smuggling operations. Several people were arrested ashore as part of an Australian Federal Police operation on 16 April, but Pong Su refused police orders to sail to the nearest port. A New South Wales Police launch attempted to detain the ship, off Eden, New South Wales on 18 April, but was unable to do so because of heavy seas. Stuart was deployed to board and capture the merchantman after scrounging sailors from other ships to make up for those on leave for the Easter weekend, embarking a Seahawk helicopter, and taking onboard special forces personnel from the Special Air Service Regiment and the Clearance Diving Team. Accompanied by two police launches, Stuart intercepted Pong Su 90 nautical miles (170 km; 100 mi) off Sydney on 20 April. The special forces successfully boarded the ship, and she was sailed to Sydney by a RAN steaming party.

In 2004, Stuart was deployed to the Persian Gulf as part of Operation Catalyst. On 24 April, Stuart, the patrol boat USS Firebolt, and the cruiser USS Yorktown were patrolling around the Al Başrah Oil Terminal (ABOT) and Khor Al Amaya Oil Terminal (KAAOT), with Stuart's commanding officer in tactical control of the two American warships. Around 19:00, a dhow sailed into the KAAOT security zone. Firebolt sent a RHIB to board the dhow and order the vessel away, but as the RHIB drew alongside, the dhow exploded. Stuart, 4.1 nautical miles (7.6 km; 4.7 mi) away, began sailing to assist, while the Australian ship's S-70B-2 Seahawk helicopter, 6 nautical miles (11 km; 6.9 mi) away diverted to the explosion site. The Seahawk and a RHIB from Stuart began assisting survivors from Firebolt's boarding party; after experiencing difficulty in handling the injured Americans, the Seahawk's sensor operator dived into the water to assist. Casualties were brought aboard Firebolt, then transferred by helicopter and boat to Stuart. Meanwhile, two more dhows attempted to attack ABOT—the explosion of the first dhow was the prelude to a coordinated attack on the oil terminal—but were fended off by the facility's Iraqi security team and detonated before reaching their targets. Three of the seven personnel aboard Firebolt's RHIB were killed, and the other four were seriously injured. The Seahawk's sensor operator was later awarded the Medal for Gallantry for his actions during the incident.

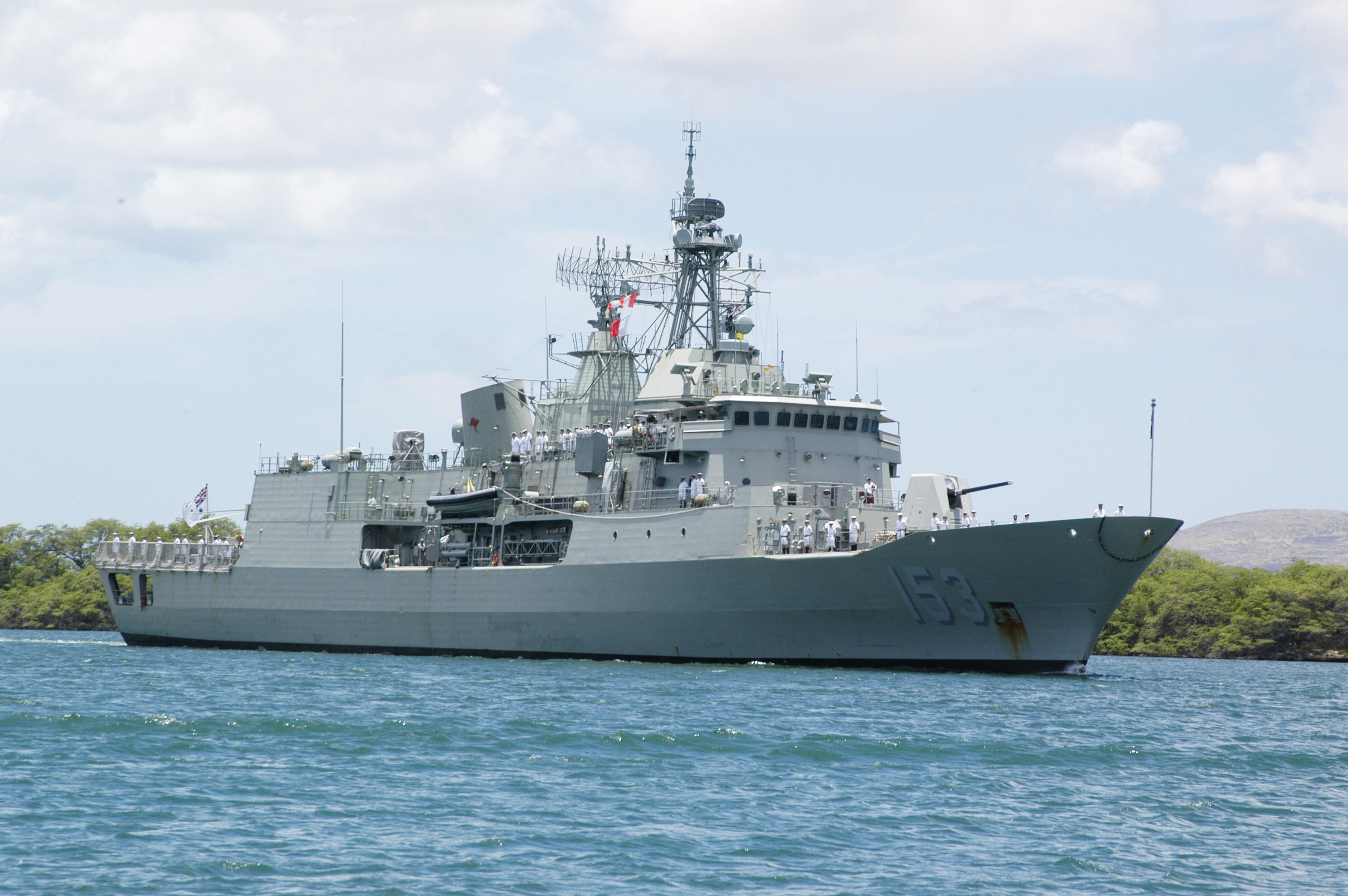
Stuart arriving at Pearl Harbor, Hawaii in 2006 shortly before participating in that year's RIMPAC training exercise

In February 2006, fire broke out about HMNZS Te Mana, Stuart's sister ship, during an exercise off the coast of Australia. Te Mana's Seasprite helicopter was diverted to Stuart, while the fire was put out by the crew.

On the morning of 13 March 2009, Stuart was one of seventeen warships involved in a ceremonial fleet entry and fleet review in Sydney Harbour, the largest collection of RAN ships since the Australian Bicentenary in 1988. The frigate was one of the thirteen ships involved in the ceremonial entry through Sydney Heads, and anchored in the harbour for the review.

On 22 March 2011, while operating off Somalia as part of Combined Task Force 151, Stuart machine-gunned an unmanned skiff being towed by MV Sinar Kudus, a hijacked cargo carrier operating as a pirate mother ship. The skiff was destroyed. This was the first time an Australian warship had fired in anger at Somali pirates.

On 11 April 2011, Stuart interdicted the Yemeni-flagged dhow named Al Shahar 75. A boarding party from the frigate rescued three crew members being held hostage, while the fifteen Somali pirates, who had surrendered as Stuart approached, were allowed to return to their skiff and sail to shore after their weapons and equipment were disposed of.

In October 2013, Stuart participated in the International Fleet Review 2013 in Sydney.

In November 2014, Stuart and sister ship Parramatta were deployed to shadow a Russian naval force operating in international waters off Australia during the 2014 G-20 Brisbane summit. The Russian deployment was believed to be in response to troubled recent relationships between the two nations.

Stuart is the last ship of the Anzac class to undergo the Anti-Ship Missile Defence (ASMD) upgrade. The upgrade will include the fitting of CEA Technologies' CEAFAR and CEAMOUNT phased array radars on new masts, a Vampir NG Infrared Search and Track system, and Sharpeye Navigational Radar Systems, along with improvements to the operations room equipment and layout. Work commenced in early 2016, and is due to be completed by 2017.

HMAS Stuart joined KDB Darulehsan, HMAS Sirius, USS Rafael Peralta and RSS Supreme on their way to Pearl Harbor, Hawaii in preparation for RIMPAC 2020 on 6 August. RIMPAC 2020 will scheduled to start on 17 August.

The ship participated in Exercise Malabar 2024 which was held from 8 to 18 October.
