= HMNZS Te Mana =

Anzac-class frigate of Royal New Zealand Navy

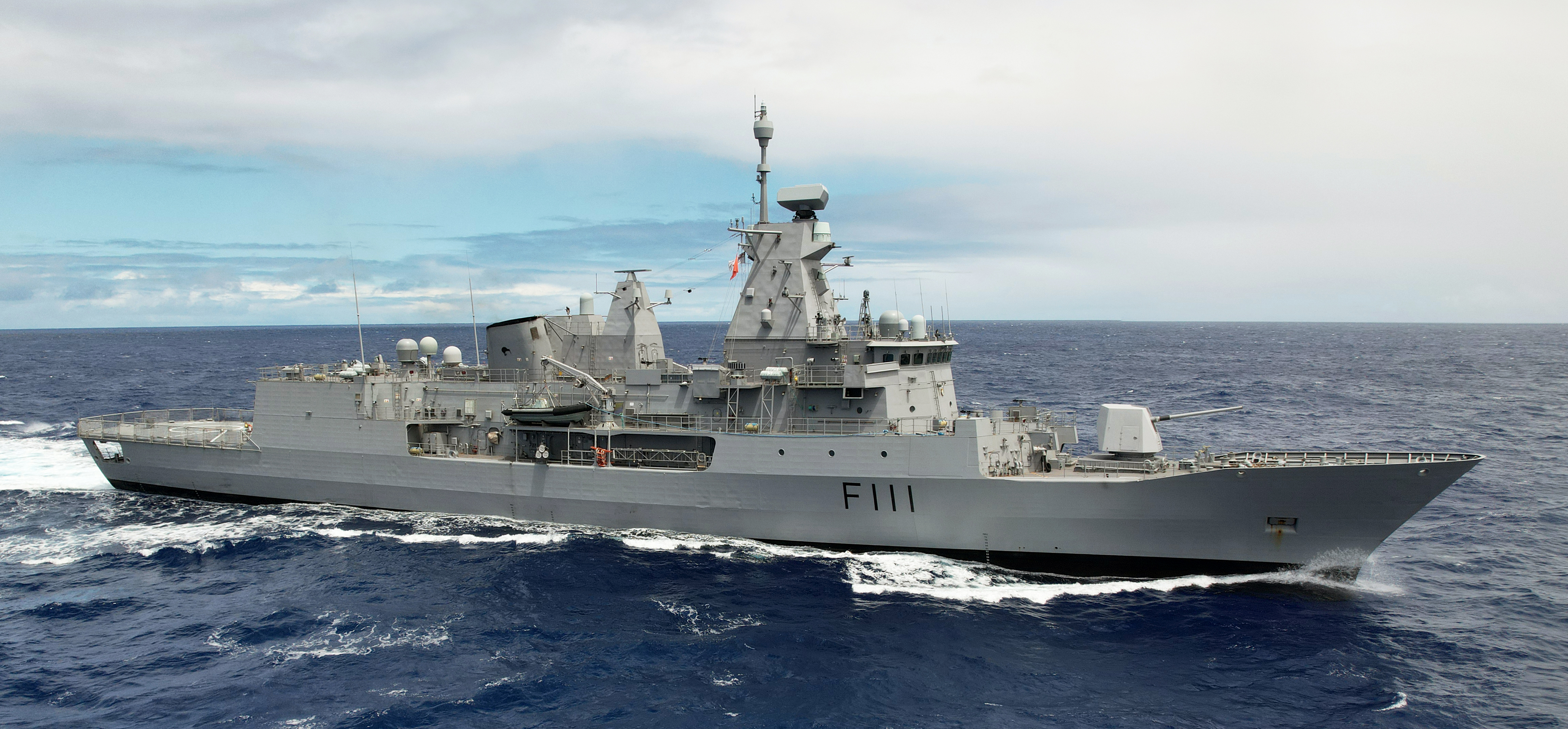
- HMNZS Te Mana, June 2022

History

New Zealand
- Name: HMNZS Te Mana
- Namesake: The concept of Mana
- Builder: Tenix Defence
- Laid down: 18 May 1996
- Launched: 10 May 1997
- Sponsored by: Dame Te Atairangikaahu
- Commissioned: 10 December 1999
- Identification: MMSI number: 512000700
- Motto: Kokiri Kia U (Māori: "Striving towards perfection")
- Status: Active as of 2026

General characteristics
- Class & type: Anzac-class frigate
- Displacement: 3,600 tonnes full load
- Length: 118 m (387 ft 2 in)
- Beam: 15 m (49 ft 3 in)
- Draught: 4 m (13 ft 1 in)
- Propulsion: 1 × General Electric LM2500+ gas turbine providing 30,000 hp (22,000 kW); 2 × MTU 12V1163 engines providing 8,840 hp (6.5 MW) (later upgraded to TB93); two shafts with controllable pitch propellers in CODOG configuration
- Speed: 27 knots (50 km/h; 31 mph)
- Range: 6,000 nmi (11,000 km; 6,900 mi) at 18 knots (33 km/h; 21 mph)
- Complement: 178 officers and ratings (25 officers, 153 ratings)
- Sensors & processing systems: Sonars: Broadband Sonar Advanced Processing System (BSAPS) for the Spherion B hull-mounted sonar and the TUUM-6 multi-channel Digital Underwater Communication System (DUWCS). Provision for towed array; Air search radar: Thales Group Smart-S Mk2 3d multi-beam naval search radar.; Surface search radar: Thales Group Smart-S Mk2 3d multi-beam naval search radar. Sharpe Eye 2D.; Navigation: Two Furuno 3320 series X band radars.; Infred: Vampir IRST Infred.; Laser: Elbit Systems Laser Warning/Detection.
- Electronic warfare & decoys: ESM: Eibit/Elisra ESM.; Countermeasures: Decoys: G & D Aircraft SRBOC Mk 36 Mod 1 decoy launchers for SRBOC. Rheinmetall MASS. DLF Floating Decoys. Sea Sentor.
- Armament: Guns and missiles: 1 × 5 in/54 (127 mm) Mk 45 Mod 2 gun.; 1 × Phalanx CIWS; 8 × M2 .50 Cal Browning machine guns (2 are Mini Typhoon); 20 GWS.35 VLS cells for Sea Ceptor surface-to-air missiles; AGM-119 Mk 2 Mod 7 Penguin missile launched from SH-2G(I) Super Seasprite; Torpedoes: 2 × triple 324 mm Mk 32 Mod 5 tubes or launched from SH-2G(I) Super Seasprite; Mark 46 torpedo; Fire control: Navantia fire control; Combat data systems: CMS 330 Link 16; Weapons control: CMS 330 Navantia fire control; Fitted for but not with; Not armed with long range anti-ship missiles ie; Harpoon, NSM
- Aircraft carried: One Kaman SH-2G Super Seasprite helicopter

HMNZS Te Mana (F111) is one of ten Anzac-class frigates and one of two serving in the Royal New Zealand Navy (RNZN). The name Te Mana is Māori, approximately translating as 'status' or 'authority' (for further information on this term, see Mana). The ship was laid down under the joint Anzac project by Tenix Defence at Williamstown, Victoria in 1996, launched in 1997, and commissioned into the RNZN in 1999.

In 2003 and 2004 and 2013–2014, Te Mana was deployed on operations in the Arabian Sea. In 2005, she became the first New Zealand warship to visit a Russian port, Vladivostok.

On 5 August 2015, the ship emerged from the dry dock at Devonport Naval Base wearing the US Navy 'Haze Grey' coating, following a major systems upgrade which involved a long refit.

Te Mana represented New Zealand in the 2018 Rim of the Pacific exercise in Hawaii and was crowned the winner of RIMPAC's Naval Surface Fire Support Rodeo competition, with the ship landing her shells closer to the target than any other ship.

== Design and construction ==
During the mid-1980s, the RNZN began considering the replacement of their four Leander-class frigates. Around the same time, a deterioration in New Zealand-United States relations forced the New Zealand government to improve ties with local nations. As the Royal Australian Navy (RAN) was seeking to replace their River-class destroyer escorts with ships nearly identical to what the RNZN wanted, the two nations decided to collaborate on the acquisition in early 1987. Tenders had been requested in 1986, and 12 ship designs (including an airship) were submitted. By August 1987, these were narrowed down in October to Blohm + Voss's MEKO 200 design, the M class (later Karel Doorman class) offered by Royal Schelde, and a scaled-down Type 23 frigate proposed by Yarrow Shipbuilders. In 1989, the Australian government announced that Melbourne-based shipbuilder AMECON (which became Tenix Defence) would build the modified MEKO 200 design. However, the decision to buy the frigates had been highly controversial in New Zealand, primarily because of the cost of purchasing frigate-type ships, plus the idea that the high-capability warships would be too few and too overspecialised for the fisheries and economic exclusion zone (EEZ) patrols expected to be the RNZN's core operations. Despite ongoing debate, the New Zealand government agreed to purchase two frigates in addition to the RAN's eight, and had an option for two more. This option expired in 1997 without the New Zealanders acting upon it; there were proposals to buy a new or second-hand Anzac outside the terms of the original contract, but a lack of political support stopped this developing, and the number built for the RNZN remained at two. The drop in capability and the issue of tying up the Anzacs on EEZ patrols when they could be deployed more suitably elsewhere were factors leading to the RNZN's Project Protector acquisition program.

The Anzacs are based on Blohm + Voss' MEKO 200 PN (or Vasco da Gama-class) frigates, modified to meet Australian and New Zealand specifications and maximise the use of locally built equipment. Each frigate has a 3,600-tonne (3,500-long-ton) full load displacement. The ships are 109 metres (357 ft 7 in) long at the waterline, and 118 metres (387 ft 2 in) long overall, with a beam of 14.8 metres (48 ft 7 in), and a full load draught of 4.35 metres (14 ft 3 in). The ships are fitted with a Combined Diesel or Gas (CODOG) propulsion machinery layout, consisting of two controllable-pitch propellers driven by a single General Electric LM2500-30 gas turbine and two MTU diesel engines: initially the TB83 model, but these were replaced in 2010 with more powerful TB93s. Maximum speed is 27 knots (50 km/h; 31 mph), and maximum range is over 6,000 nautical miles (11,000 km; 6,900 mi) at 18 knots (33 km/h; 21 mph); about 50% greater than other MEKO 200 designs. The standard ship's company of an Anzac consists of 22 officers and 141 sailors.

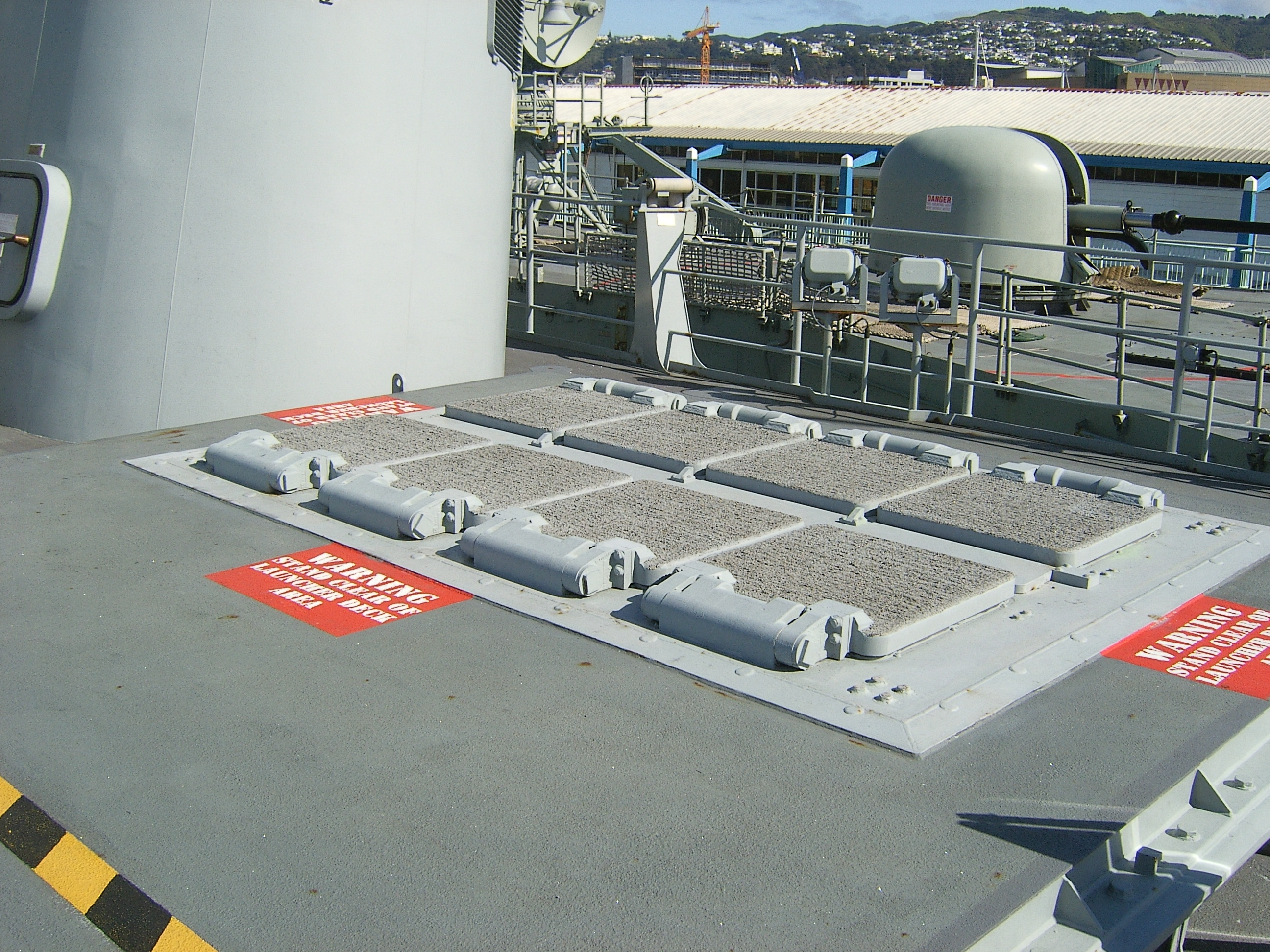
The Mark 41 vertical launch system fitted to Te Mana

As designed, the main armament for the frigate is a 5-inch 54 calibre Mark 45 gun, supplemented by an eight-cell Mark 41 vertical launch system for RIM-7 Sea Sparrow, two 12.7-millimetre (0.50 in) machine guns, and two Mark 32 triple torpedo tube sets firing Mark 46 torpedoes. They were also designed for but not with a close-in weapons system (a Phalanx CIWS installed shortly after the frigate's completion, supplemented by two Mini Typhoons from 2006 onwards), two quad-canister Harpoon missile launchers, and a second Mark 41 launcher (neither of which have been added to the New Zealand ships). The New Zealand Anzacs initially operated with a Westland Wasp helicopter, which were later replaced by Kaman SH-2 Seasprites, then Kaman SH-2G Super Seasprite helicopters.

Te Mana was laid down at Williamstown, Victoria on 18 May 1996. The ship was assembled from six hull modules and six superstructure modules; the superstructure modules were fabricated in Whangarei, New Zealand, and hull modules were built at both Williamstown and Newcastle, New South Wales, with final integration at Williamstown. She was launched on 10 May 1997 by the Maori Queen, Dame Te Atairangikaahu, and commissioned into the RNZN on 10 December 1999 in her ceremonial homeport of Tauranga. In early 2002, microscopic cracks in Te Mana's bilge keel and hull plating were discovered. This problem, which was common to the first four ships of the Anzac class, was later rectified.

== Operational history ==
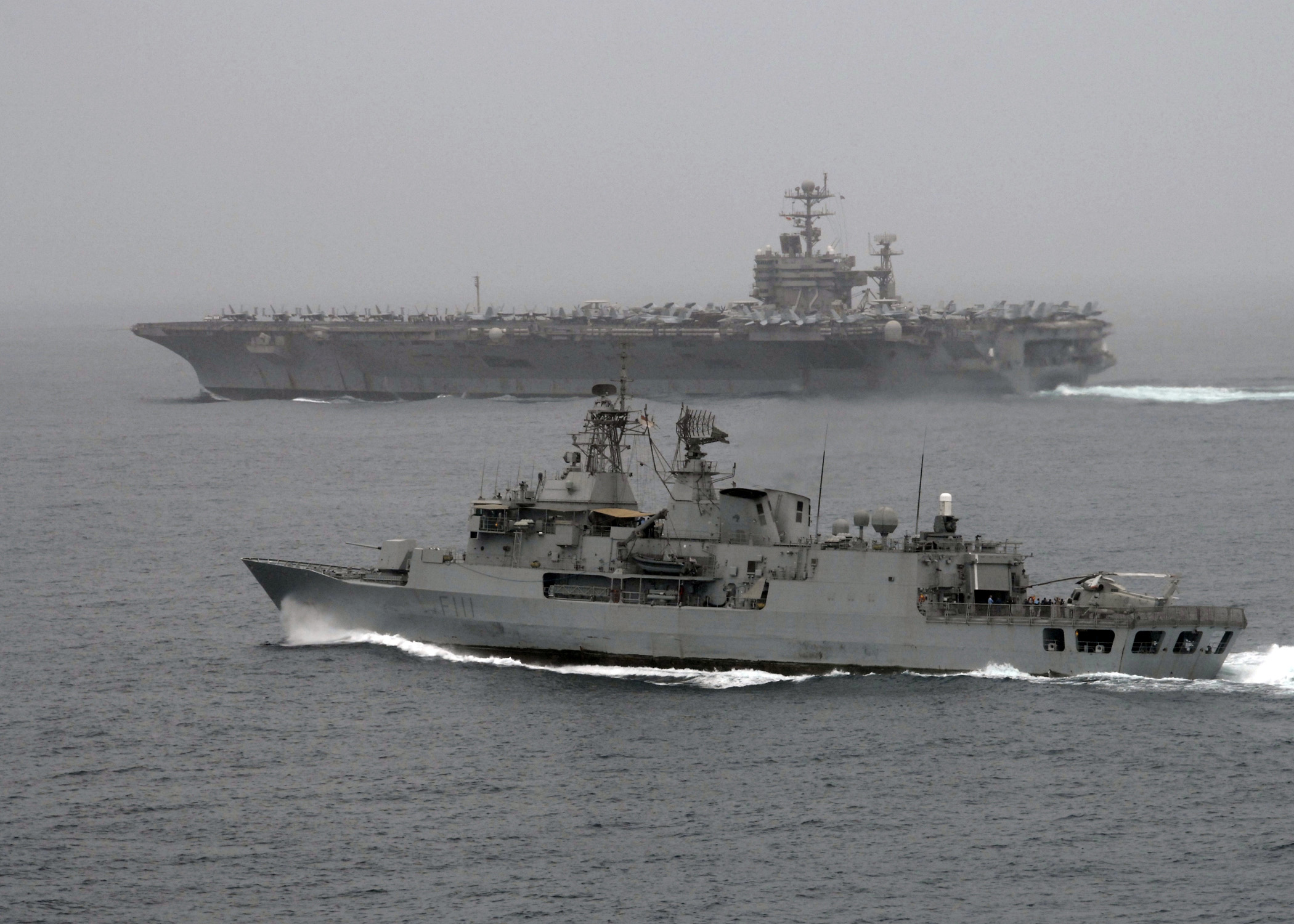
Te Mana operating with the aircraft carrier USS Abraham Lincoln

Te Mana was sent to the Solomon Islands in 2000, in preparation to evacuate around 225 New Zealanders from the ethnic conflict on the islands.

A sailor died at sea aboard the frigate on 29 March 2001; the death was investigated by the New Zealand Police but treated as not suspicious.

In February 2002, a Seasprite helicopter flown by a Royal Australian Navy test pilot crashed into Te Mana's deck. The ship was operating during 3-metre (9.8 ft) high seas in Cook Strait, a court of enquiry later found that no single event was to blame for the accident. The repairs to the Seasprite cost an estimated $7.4 million.

Te Mana went to the aid of HMS Nottingham in July 2002, when Nottingham ran aground on the submerged Wolf Rock, and provided manpower, supplies and salvage equipment to the stricken vessel.

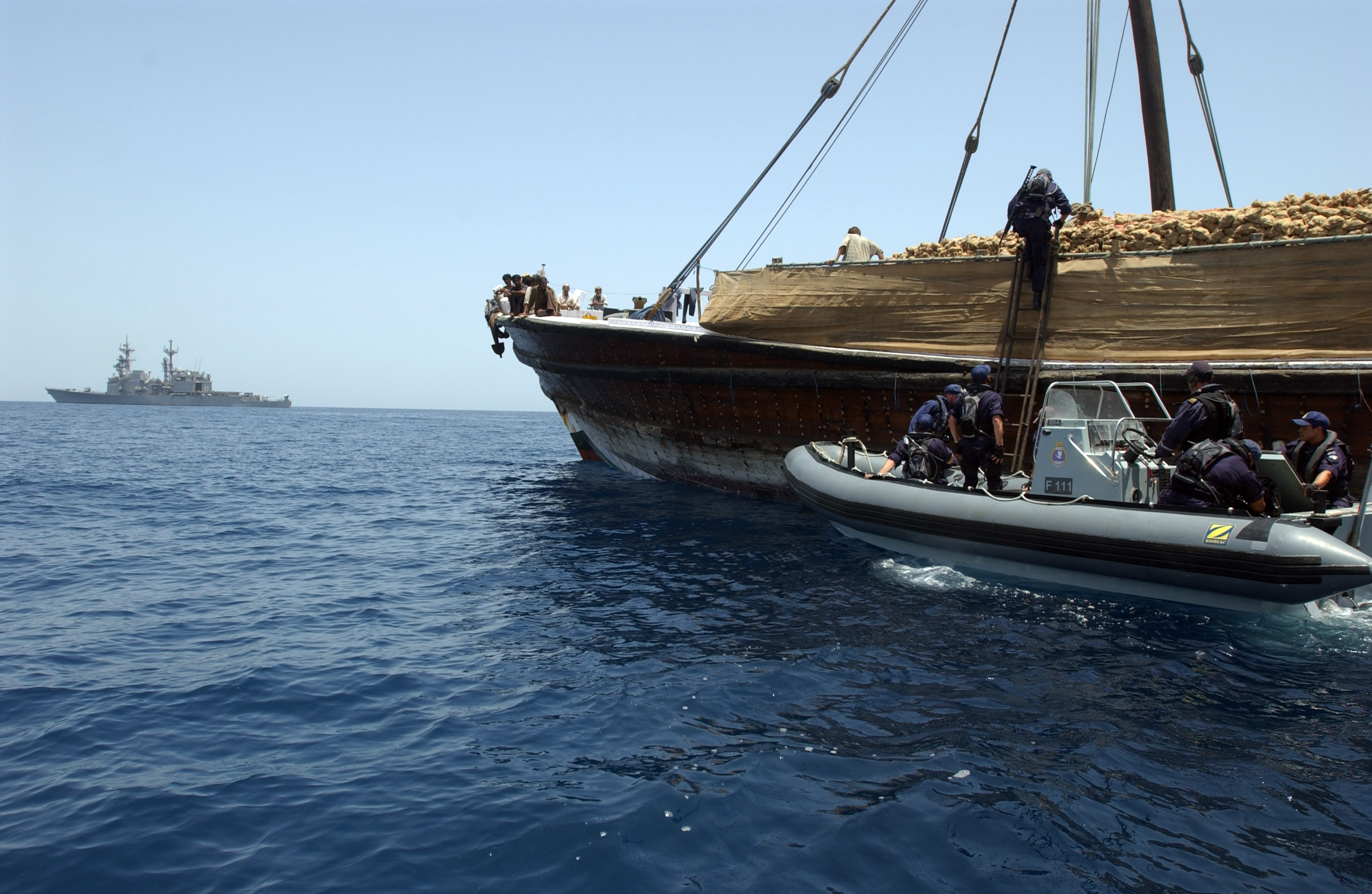
A boarding party from Te Mana commencing inspection of a dhow in the Gulf of Oman during May 2004

From 28 January 2003 until 4 August 2003, Te Mana was deployed to the Gulf of Oman and the Arabian Sea, conducting Maritime Interdiction Operations as part of Operation Enduring Freedom.

Te Mana deployed to the Arabian Sea and the Gulf of Oman for a second time in 2004, again to undertake Maritime Interdiction Operations, as part of Combined Task Force 150. In May the helicopter was damaged, at a cost of up to $4 million; a court of enquiry later found the pilot and co-pilot had failed to lash the aircraft down to the deck correctly. In the Gulf of Oman on 14 July 2004, a crew member aboard a merchant bulk chemical carrier fell into a tank while cleaning it. Te Mana responded to the emergency call and sprinted to the scene, the ship's medic was flown over to the bulk carrier, but the patient was unable to be revived. She returned to Devonport on 10 September 2004, having queried 380 ships and boarded 38.

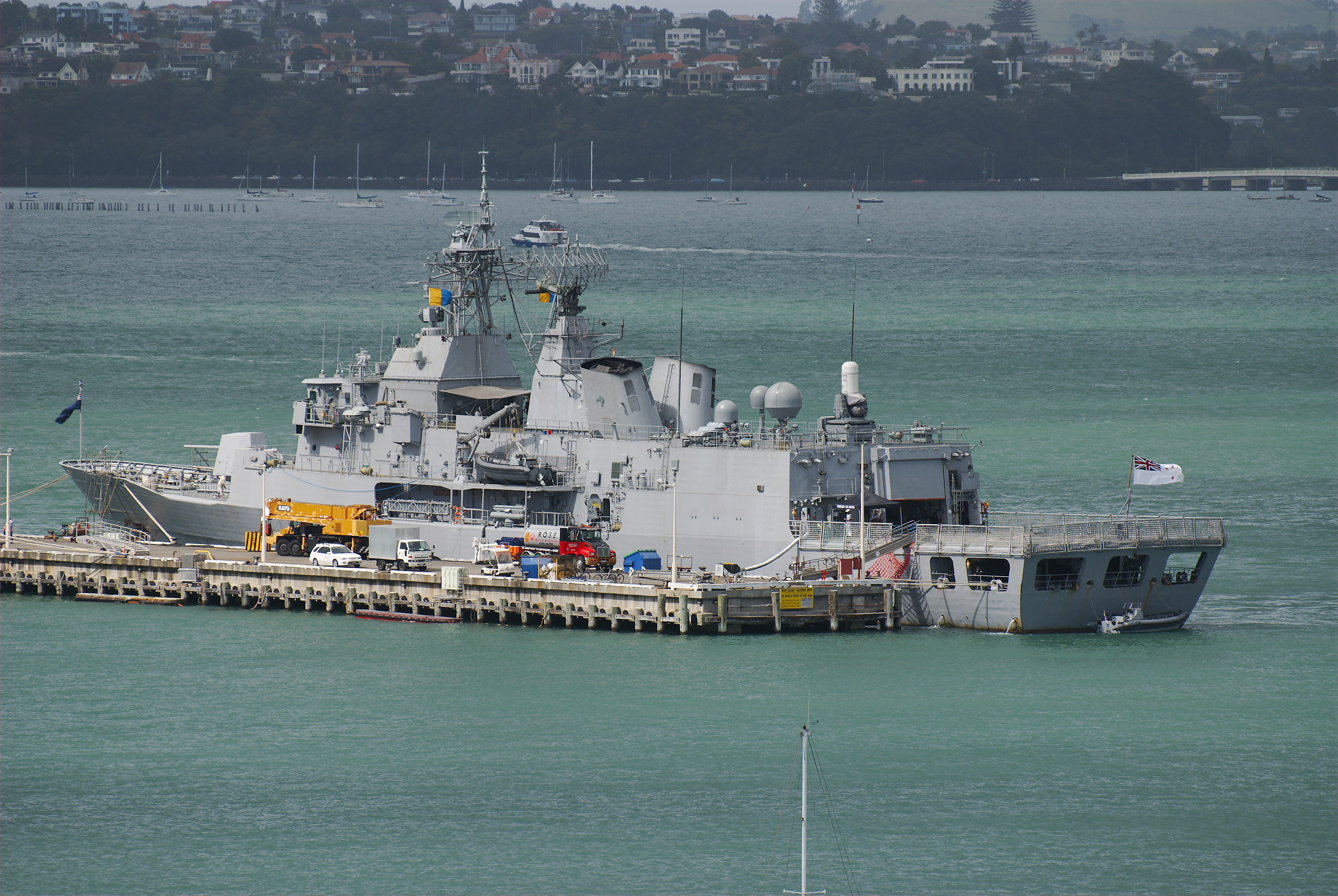
Te Mana alongside at Devonport in 2008

Te Mana and HMNZS Endeavour were the first RNZN vessels to visit Russia, arriving in the Pacific port of Vladivostok on 10 June 2005 on a diplomatic mission.

A fire broke out about Te Mana in February 2006, while it was participating in an exercise off the coast of Australia. The ship's Seasprite helicopter was diverted to sister ship HMAS Stuart and the fire was put out by the crew.

The breeding ground of the Kermadec Storm Petrel was discovered with the assistance of Te Mana in August 2006, when the ship transported an ornithologist to a rocky outcrop in the Kermadec Islands group, enabling him to find a nest. The ship was on the annual mission to resupply Raoul Island for the Department of Conservation.

Early in 2007 the vessel's diesel engines developed a problem as she crossed the Tasman Sea to Sydney. The engines became unusable and the ship had to use the gas turbine for propulsion. Sister ship Te Kaha suffered a similar problem one month later.

Te Mana deployed from Devonport to the Central and Southern Persian Gulf on 7 April 2008, as part of Coalition Task Force 152. Sailing via Singapore, she arrived on 11 May 2008, beginning a three-month patrol of the region's waterways, including guarding against threats to the oil industry infrastructure, as well to prevent smuggling and piracy.

In October 2013, Te Mana participated in the International Fleet Review 2013 in Sydney.

On June 14, 2017, Commander Lisa Hunn became the first female commanding officer of a RNZN warship, when she took command of Te Mana.

In 2026 Te Mana finished a major maintenance that took over 21 months to do. The ship was maintained at the Devonport Naval Base drydock.

== Refit ==
In 2018, a comprehensive mid-life refit of both Te Mana and her sister ship was initiated. The refit provided for the replacement of the Sea Sparrow air defence missiles with Sea Ceptor as well as other comprehensive system upgrades carrying a total cost of some $600 million. The refit of Te Mana was being undertaken by the Seaspan shipyard in Canada as of 2020.

On 16 April 2021, six RNZN personnel and six family members assigned to Te Mana tested positive for COVID-19. At the time, the naval personnel and their family were stationed at an accommodation block 12 kilometers away from the Royal Canadian Navy's base at Esquimalt near Victoria, British Columbia. Te Mana was undergoing a major upgrade in Canada. In May 2022, the ship sailed for New Zealand having completed her upgrade.

== See also ==
- Frigates of the Royal New Zealand Navy
