= HMAS Parramatta =

Four ships of the Royal Australian Navy been named HMAS Parramatta, for the Parramatta River. The name comes from the Barramattagal people (burra meaning eel and matta meaning creek).

- HMAS Parramatta (D55), a River-class destroyer commissioned in 1910, paid off in 1928, and sold for scrap
- HMAS Parramatta (U44), a Grimsby-class sloop commissioned in 1939, and sunk by U-559 off Tobruk on 27 November 1941
- HMAS Parramatta (DE 46), a River-class destroyer escort commissioned in 1961 and decommissioned in 1991
- HMAS Parramatta (FFH 154), an Anzac-class frigate commissioned in 2003 and active as of 2016
- Photogrammetric 3d model compiled by submerg3d group https://submerg3d.com/hmas-parramatta/

== Battle honours ==
Ships named HMAS Parramatta are entitled to carry four battle honours:

- Rabaul 1914
- Adriatic 1917–18
- Libya 1941
- Malaysia 1964–66
