= HMCS Saskatchewan =

Several Canadian naval units have been named HMCS Saskatchewan.

- HMCS Saskatchewan (H70) (I) was a Second World War River-class destroyer.
- HMCS Saskatchewan (DDE 262) (II) was a Cold War-era Mackenzie-class destroyer.
- HMCS Saskatchewan was a planned Canada-class submarine cancelled in 1989

== Battle honours ==
- Atlantic 1943–44
- Normandy 1944
- Biscay 1944
