= AN/SQS-504 =

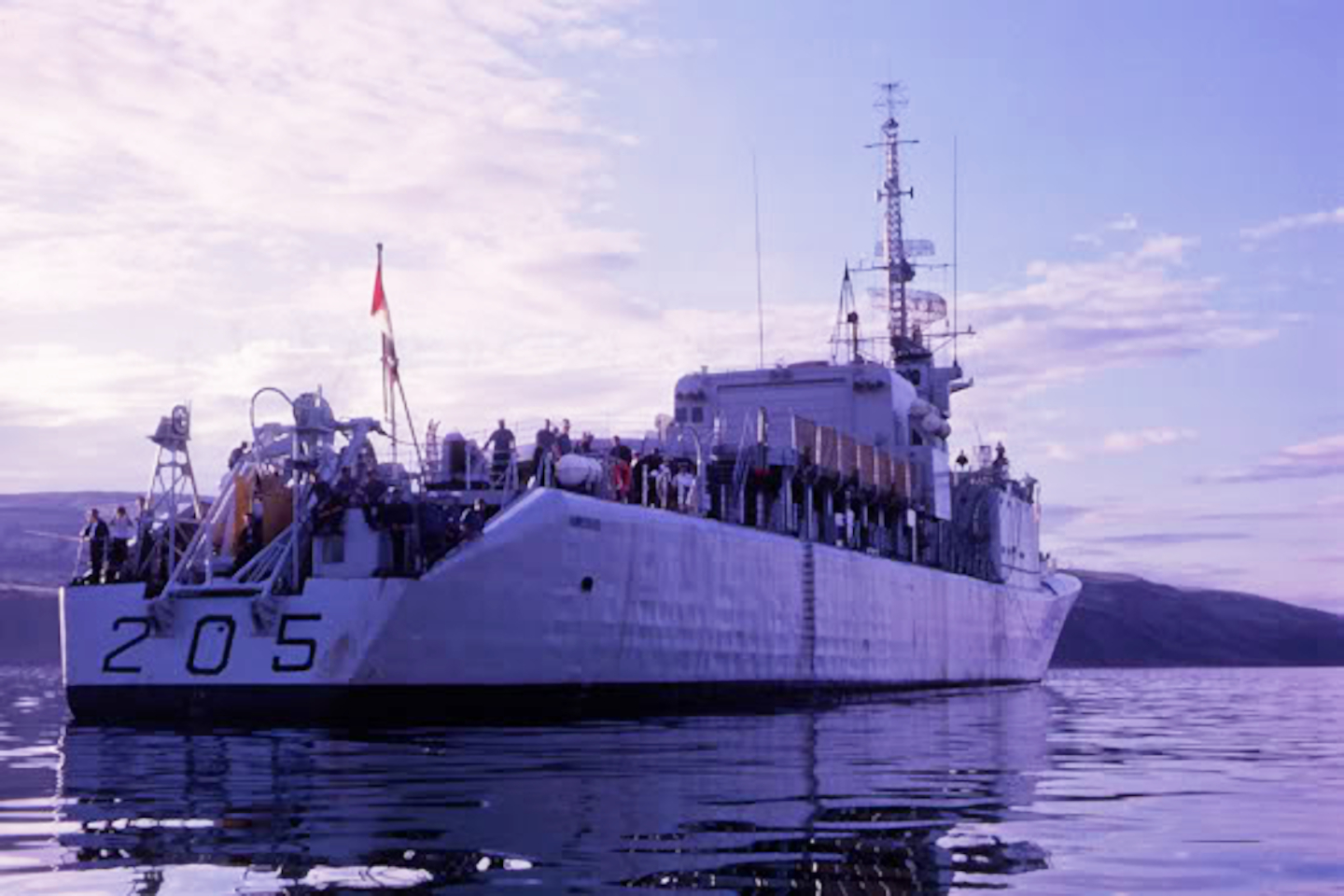
HMCS St. Laurent with stern-mounted SQS-504 Variable Depth Sonar

The AN/SQS-504 Diver was an early naval medium-frequency active variable depth sonar (VDS) developed in Canada.

The AN/SQS-504 emerged from a post-Second World War program to improve the detection of submarines between the thermal layers in the Gulf of Saint Lawrence. A transducer derived from a wartime British Type 144 sonar was placed in a towed body and deployed from the stern by the AN/SQA-501 handling gear. The AN/SQS-504 was succeeded by the AN/SQS-505, which used a then-modern transducer and receiver.

It was deployed in the 1960s by the Royal Canadian Navy (RCN), the British Royal Navy (RN), and the Royal Australian Navy. The United States Navy (USN) did not adopt the AN/SQS-504, but the design of the towed body handling gear influenced later USN VDS.

The success of the AN/SQS-504 has led to claims that VDS was invented or primarily developed in Canada.

== Development ==
=== Early experiments ===
During the Second World War, the thermal layers in the Gulf of Saint Lawrence severely decreased the detection range of hull-mounted sonar. From 1944 to 1948, Canadian institutions used sonar and bathythermographs to investigate the effect of oceanic and seasonal conditions on underwater sound propagation. After war, the Naval Research Establishment (NRE) conducted sonar ranging trials in the Bay of Fundy and St. Margarets Bay, Nova Scotia with British Type 144 sonar. In December 1948, the NRE reported that in the summer the waters of the Scotian Shelf was divided into three temperature layers, and a sonar lowered into the cold middle layer might have good detection range against submarines within that layer.

In 1949, the RCN issued requirements for a towed sonar for operations in the shallow waters of the Gulf of Saint Lawrence and off Halifax, Nova Scotia. The Defence Research Board of Canada (DRBC) organized a development program for a towed dipping sonar in April 1949. Early trials were conducted using an experimental dipping sonar called "Hot Dog", a harbour defence sonar capsule lowered over the side or rear of a stationary ship by electrical cable. The trials confirmed the possibility of achieving long detection ranges and the reduced efficacy of hull-mounted sonar against targets in the middle layer. The RCN requested top priority for the project in October 1952, and the development effort became "Project DUNKER". RCN requirements were revised in 1954; it now called for a sonar that could be deployed at variable depths, and so would be useful in wider range of conditions.

=== Towing body ===
The next step was the development of a towing body and faired cables suitable for operational use on RCN warships at a speed of 15 to 20 knots (28 to 37 km/h; 17 to 23 mph). The first experimental towing body, "Toby", was torpedo-shaped; after being lost it was replaced by "Toby II", which incorporated an aluminium nose with a fixed Type 144. A Winged Housed Air Towed Sonar (WHATS), developed by the EDO Corporation for blimp-towed sonars, was also adapted for experiments. NRE designed the "Canadian Body" (Canby) and contracted the Fairey Aviation Company to build it; Canby was trialled in October 1953.

Ultimately, the towing body that was adapted for service was the "Trilby". Trilby was based on a RN 100-inch (250 cm) sonar dome and developed in close cooperation with the David Taylor Model Basin (DTMB) in the United States; its shape was radically different than Canby, allowing it to house a larger transducer that could also be trained all around. Trilby was first trialled in 1955. The after ends of the tails fins were sharpened "knife sharpness" to eliminate tail flutter which jammed the sonar receiver.

The development of cable fairing was required to solve serious tow-off problems. Trials only began in spring 1952 after delays caused by Cold War and Korean War rearmament. The tow-off problem was solved in early 1953 by completely redesigning the fairing with the help of DTMB. Over-the-stern towing was found to be superior to over-the-side towing—the latter was then being pursued by the USN.

=== Transducer ===
NRE developed a new "searchlight" sonar called "Canadian ASDIC Search Towed 1" (CAST/1), using the Type 144 as a starting point. The transducer used a high-activity low-impedance piezoelectric ceramic developed by NRE; the ceramic, called NRE-4, was barium titanate with small quantities of cobalt. NRE-4 allowed transmission power 300-times greater than the steel-quartz transducer in the Type 144. British and American ceramics were not available due to industrial supply issues. Initially, the connecting cable's electrical conductors burned failed after a few hours of use; this was resolved by adopting design and testing procedures for such cables from the Department of Mines in Ontario. CAST/1 also had a split beam direction finding system.

=== Handling gear ===
Development of the AN/SQA-501 handling gear occurred from the early 1950s to 1960. Early development used parts salvaged from DRBC experiments and naval stocks. During one trial, the cable release clutch failed to function when the cable or body became caught underwater; the cable pulled itself off the drum and destroyed the gearbox. The clutch was upgraded to release under higher strain. The parallel mechanism was also redesigned to prevent jamming during a recovery operation.

=== CAST/1/R and CAST/1/X ===
CAST/1 was placed into the towed body to create the "Canadian ASDIC Search Towed research 1" (CAST/1/R) VDS. CAST/1/R was successfully tested in the Bermuda area in December 1955.

A related development was the "Canadian ASDIC Search Towed experimental 1" (CAST/1/X) VDS; CAST/1/X used modified Canby handling gear, and an experimental version of CAST/1 that operated on a "train-ping-listen" sequence. CAST/1/X was completed and installed on HMCS Crusader in June 1956. It conducted successful submarine target trials in September and November that same year. CAST/1/X out-ranged the Type 144 used by the RCN by a factor of five.

In 1958, the CAST/1/X, aboard Crusader, performed comparative tests with the British experimental Type 192x VDS, aboard HMS Brocklesby. The CAST/1/X performed similarly to the much larger Type 192x. The British subsequently abandoned the Type 192x and adopted the Canadian system as the Type 199.

CAST/1/X was re-engineered to meet naval standards to become the AN/SQS-504.

== Problems in service ==
Deficiencies in the AN/SQA-501 handling gear, which made operating the AN/SQS-504 difficult to impossible, became apparent within a few years of entering service. Problems included poorly designed hydraulics, damage to the AN/SQS-504 because it was slightly too wide to fit between the saddle arms, and an overall haphazard design. In 1964, the RCN formed a small team that worked to fix the AN/SQA-501, although time and material were not formally allocated. This followed a hoist failure on HMCS St. Laurent which prevented the recovery of the AN/SQS-504 for 18 hours during JETEX 64.

A further difficulty was the range of RCN anti-submarine (ASW) weapons. The AN/SQS-504 had a range of 5,000 to 7,000 yards (4,600 to 6,400 m), but upon entering service the RCN was equipped with the much shorter-ranged Limbo mortar and Mark 43 torpedo.

Even as the AN/SQS-504 entered service, the RCN was already looking for longer-ranged sonar to vector ASW helicopters against faster and deeper diving Soviet nuclear submarines. In 1960, the RCN initiated Project DIANA ONE which ultimately resulted in the AN/SQS-505 hull and VDS sonar and the AN/SQA-502 handling gear.

== Variants ==
The British Type 199 is an AN/SQS-504 with RN rigging.

== Operators ==
Australia

- River-class destroyer escort (Type 199) (retired)

Only HMAS Stuart and Derwent were fitted. The sonar was unsuccessful in Australian service and later removed.

Canada

- Annapolis-class destroyer (retired)
- St. Laurent-class destroyer (retired)

United Kingdom

- Leander-class frigate (Type 199) (retired)

== See also ==
- AN/SQS-505, an improved Canadian hull and VDS sonar system developed in the 1960s
- Canadian Towed Array Sonar System, a towed array sonar developed in the 1980s
