= HMAS Parramatta (DE 46) =

River class destroyer escort of the Royal Australian Navy

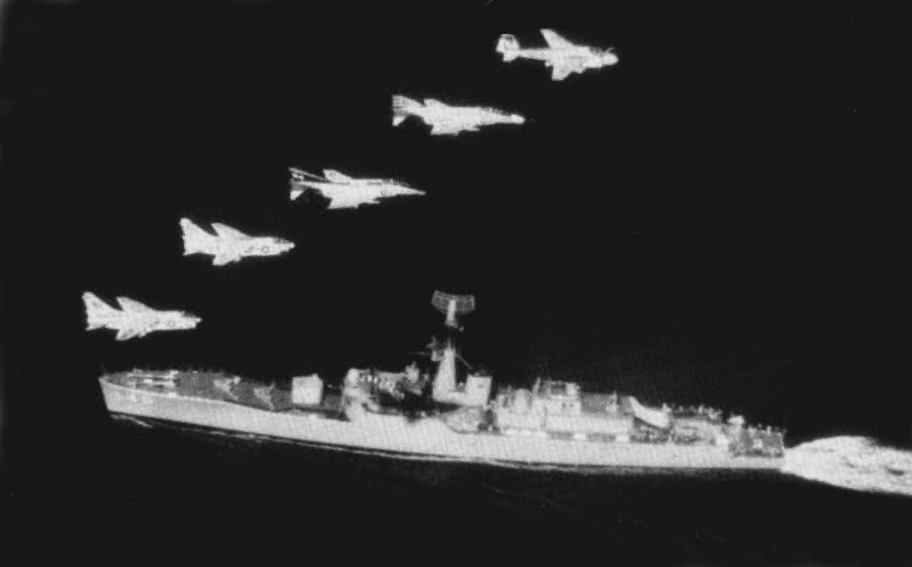
- Paramatta circa 1974

History

Australia
- Namesake: The Parramatta River
- Builder: Cockatoo Island Dockyard
- Laid down: 31 January 1957
- Launched: 31 January 1959
- Commissioned: 14 July 1961
- Decommissioned: 11 January 1991
- Motto: "Strike Deep"
- Honours and awards: Battle honours: Indonesia-Malaysia Confrontation; Plus three inherited battle honours
- Fate: Broken up for scrap
- Badge

General characteristics
- Class & type: River-class destroyer escort
- Displacement: 2,750 tons full load
- Length: 112.8 m (370 ft)
- Beam: 12.49 m (41.0 ft)
- Draught: 5.18 m (17.0 ft)
- Propulsion: 2 × English Electric steam turbines; 2 shafts; 30,000 shp total
- Speed: 31.9 knots (59.1 km/h; 36.7 mph)
- Sensors & processing systems: LW02 long range air warning radar; 1979: Mulloka sonar system; SPS-55 surface-search/navigation radar; Mark 22 fire control radar
- Armament: Original: 2 × 4.5 inch Mark 6 guns (1 twin turret); 2 × Limbo Mark 10 anti-submarine mortar; 1968 refit: 1 × quad Seacat SAM launcher; 1 × Ikara ASW system; 2 × Mark 32 torpedo tubes

HMAS Parramatta (F05/DE 46), named for the Parramatta River, was a River-class destroyer escort (a licence-built Type 12 frigate) of the Royal Australian Navy (RAN).

== Construction ==
Parramatta was laid down by Cockatoo Island Dockyard at Sydney, New South Wales on 31 January 1957. She was launched on 31 January 1959 by Lady Dowling, wife of the First Naval Member and Chief of Naval Staff, and commissioned into the RAN on 14 July 1961.

== Operational history ==
Parramatta escorted Royal Yacht Britannia during the visit of Queen Elizabeth II in 1963.

The ship served on patrol duties during the Indonesia-Malaysia Confrontation during the mid-1960s. On 3 June 1964, Parramatta and sister ship Yarra met the troop transport HMAS Sydney off the Philippines and escorted her to Kota Kinabalu, Singapore, and Penang to deliver Australian military units and supplies. Parramatta escorted the former aircraft carrier back to Fremantle: the return voyage to Australia was interrupted on the morning of 23 June by the detection of a suspected Indonesian submarine: the two Australian ships performed evasion tactics for eighteen hours before resuming the voyage. Other deployments were made during 1965 and 1966, with this service later recognised by the battle honour "Malaysia 1964–66".

During late May and early June 1965, Parramatta was one of several ships escorting Sydney on her first troop transport voyage to South Vietnam. Parramatta and Sydney worked together on the latter's tenth Vietnam voyage during March and April 1968 and continued service as Strategic Reserve until 18 April 1968. Parramatta's third escort run with Sydney occurred in May 1971; the former carrier's twentieth Vietnam voyage.

On 17 July 1976, Parramatta was en route to Singapore when she was diverted to Bali in response to the 1976 Bali earthquake.

Parramatta underwent a modernisation refit at Williamstown Naval Dockyard between February and March 1968 where she was fitted with Ikara AWS and Quad Seacat SAM missile systems prior to deployment in South East Asia (Vietnam); and again on 26 August 1981, and visited the People's Republic of China in 1986.

== Decommissioning and fate ==
Parramatta' paid off on 11 January 1991. She was sold in August 1991, and broken up for scrap in Pakistan.

The ship's twin 4.5 inch Mark 6 gun turret, along with the captain's cabin from time of the ship's decommissioning, are preserved at the RAN Naval Heritage Collection Repository on Spectacle Island, Sydney.
