= HMAS Stuart =

Three ships of the Royal Australian Navy (RAN) have been named HMAS Stuart:

- HMAS Stuart (D00), an Admiralty-type destroyer leader, launched in 1918 for the Royal Navy. She was transferred to the RAN in 1933, and served during World War II. The ship was paid off in 1946, and sold for scrap.
- HMAS Stuart (DE 48), launched 1961, one of six River-class destroyer escorts (based on the British Type 12 frigate) built for the RAN. She was commissioned in 1963, paid off in 1991, and sold for scrap.
- HMAS Stuart (FFH 153), an Anzac-class frigate commissioned in 2002 and active as of 2016

== Battle honours ==
Eight battle honours have been awarded to ships named HMAS Stuart:

- Mediterranean 1940
- Calabria 1940
- Libya 1940–41
- Matapan 1941
- Greece 1941
- Crete 1941
- Pacific 1942–43
- New Guinea 1942–44
