= Annapolis-class destroyer =

Canadian warship class (1964–1998)

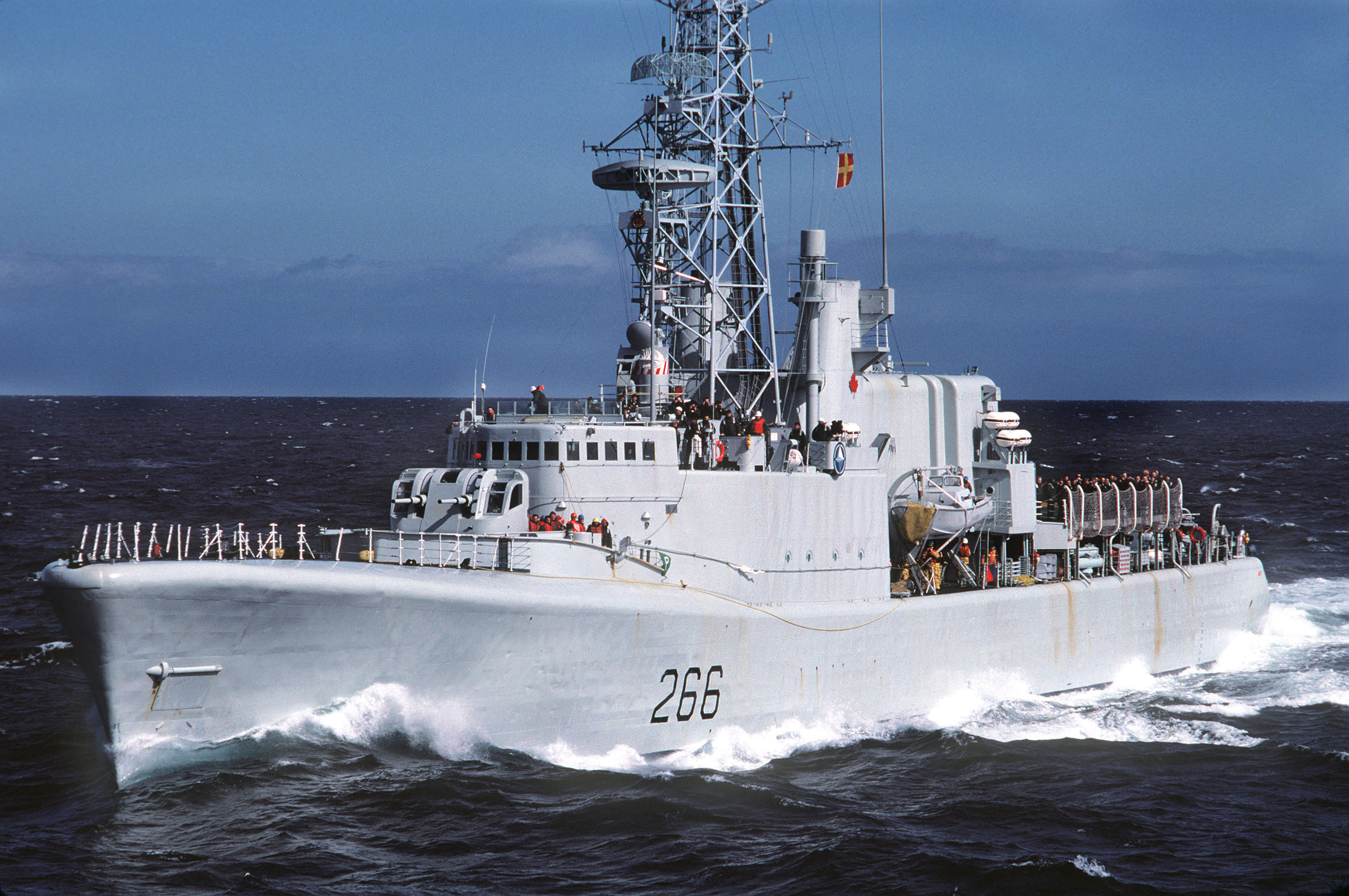
- HMCS Nipigon underway during NATO Exercise Ocean Safari '85.

Class overview
- Name: Annapolis class
- Builders: Halifax Shipyards Ltd., Halifax; Marine Industries Ltd., Sorel
- Operators: Royal Canadian Navy; Canadian Forces
- Preceded by: Mackenzie class
- Succeeded by: Iroquois class
- Built: 1960–1964
- In commission: 1964–1998
- Planned: 2
- Completed: 2
- Retired: 2

General characteristics
- Type: Destroyer escort
- Displacement: 3,420 long tons (3,474.9 t) full load
- Length: 366 ft (112 m)
- Beam: 42 ft (13 m)
- Draught: 23.5 ft (7.2 m)
- Propulsion: 2-shaft English Electric geared steam turbines; 2 Babcock & Wilcox boilers; 30,000 shp (22,000 kW)
- Speed: 28 kn (51.9 km/h; 32.2 mph)
- Complement: 228
- Sensors & processing systems: Original: 1 × SPS-12 air search radar; 1 × SPS-10B surface search radar; 1 × Sperry Mk.2 navigation radar; 1 × URN 20 TACAN radar; 1 × SQS-501 high frequency bottom profiler sonar; 1 × SQS-502 high frequency mortar control sonar; 1 × SQS-503 hull mounted active search sonar; 1 × SQS-504 VDS medium frequency active search sonar; 1 × UQC-1B "Gertrude" underwater telephone; 1 × Mk 60 GFCS fire control with SPG-48 tracker (GUNAR); DELEX: 1 × Marconi SPS-503 air search radar; 1 × Raytheon/Sylvania SPS-502 surface search radar; 1 × Sperry Mk.127E navigation radar; 1 × URN 25 TACAN radar; 1 × SQS-505(V) or SQS-510 hull mounted active search sonar; 1 × SQS-504 VDS medium frequency active search sonar; 1 × SQR-19(V) CANTASS towed array sonar; 1 × UQC-1B "Gertrude" underwater telephone; 1 × Mk 60 GFCS fire control with SPG-48 tracker (GUNAR)
- Electronic warfare & decoys: Original: 1 × ULQ-6 jammer; 1 × WLR-1C radar analyzer; 1 × UPD-501 radar detector; 1 × SRD-501 HF/DF; DELEX: 1 × SLQ-501 intercept (CANEWS); 1 × ULQ-6 jammer; 1 × SRD-501 HF/DF
- Armament: Original: 1 × FMC 3-inch/50 Mk.33 twin gun; 1 × Mk. NC 10 Limbo ASW mortar; 1 × Mk.4 thrower with homing torpedoes; DELEX: 1 × FMC 3-inch/50 Mk.33 twin gun; 2 × triple Mk.32 12.75-inch torpedo tubes firing Mk.44 or Mk.46 Mod 5 torpedoes
- Aircraft carried: 1 CH-124 Sea King ASW helicopter
- Aviation facilities: Midships helicopter deck and hangar with Beartrap.

The Annapolis-class destroyer escort was a two-ship class of destroyer escorts that saw service with the Royal Canadian Navy and Canadian Forces from the 1960s to the 1990s. The final version of the St. Laurent-class design, the class was used extensively for anti-submarine warfare purposes. Both ships were sunk as artificial reefs after being retired, one on each coast of Canada.

== Design and description ==
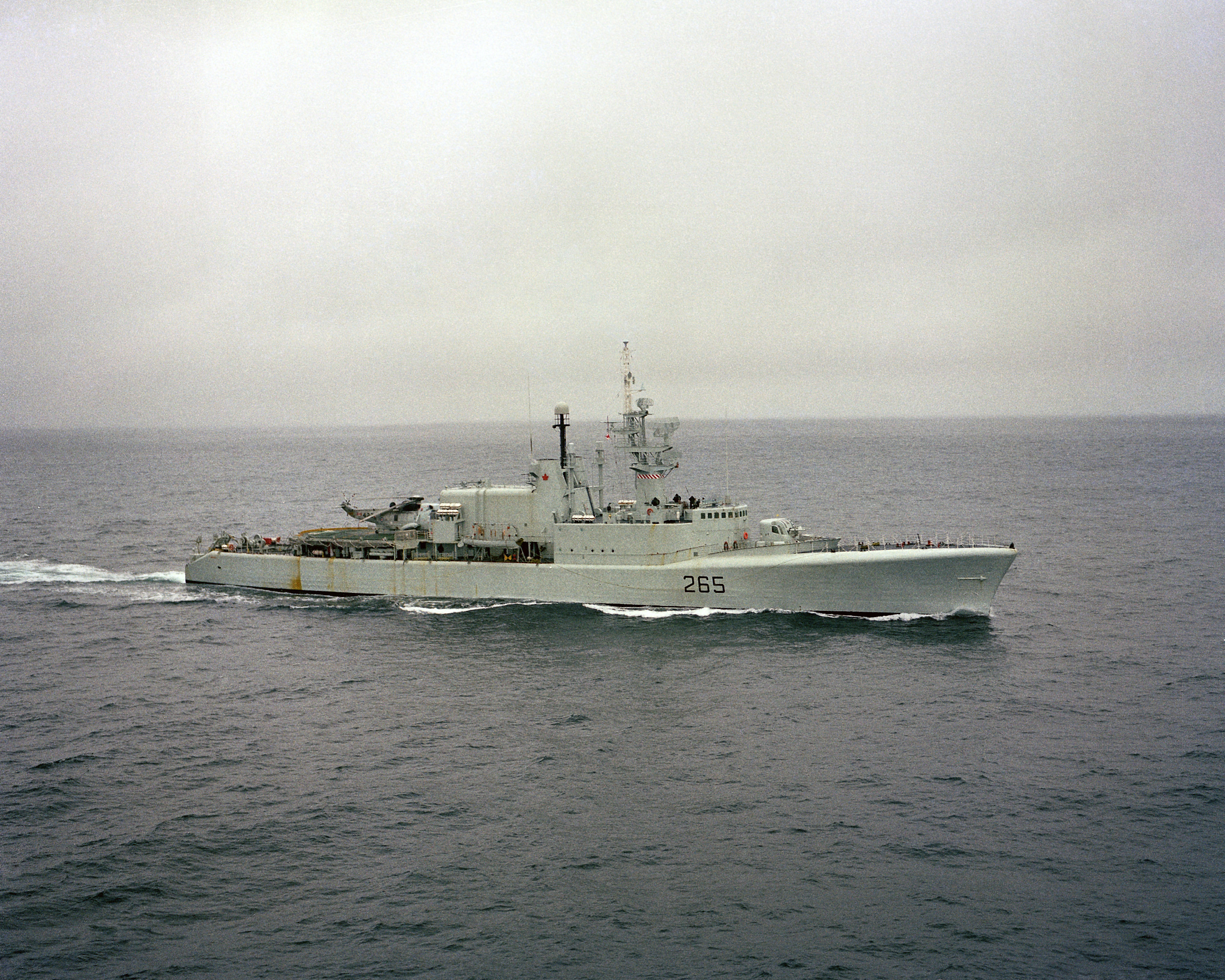
Annapolis in 1982 before her DELEX refit

The Royal Canadian Navy had intended to place a six ship order under the Mackenzie class of destroyer escorts; however, during the design phase, the last two vessels ordered were altered to the St. Laurent DDH design and were classed under the new Annapolis designation.

The ships measured 366 feet (112 m) in length, with a beam of 42 feet (13 m) and a draught of 13 feet 2 inches (4.01 m). (Note: Macpherson and Barrie have the ships at 371 feet long, and a draught of 13 feet 8 inches.) Initially, the ships displaced 2,400 tonnes (2,400 long tons) (Note: Macpherson and Barrie state that the displacement was 2,400 tons, while Conway's claims it was the same as the St. Laurent class, which was 2,000 tons.) and had a complement of 228. (Note: Macpherson and Barrie have the complement at 246. (12 officers and 234 enlisted))

The ships were powered by two Babcock & Wilcox boilers connected to the two-shaft English-Electric geared steam turbines providing 30,000 shaft horsepower (22,000 kW). This gave the ships a maximum speed of 28 knots (52 km/h; 32 mph).

The ships were initially armed with two 3-inch (76 mm)/50 calibre (Note: Calibre denotes the length of the barrel. In this case, 50 calibre means that the gun barrel is 50 times as long as it is in diameter) dual-purpose guns mounted in a single turret forward. The extra topweight of the helicopter required the return of the American Mk 22 3-inch gun over the heavier 3-inch/70 calibre guns used on the preceding class. The 3-inch/50s weighed 1,760 pounds (800 kg) and fired a projectile that weighed 13 pounds (5.9 kg). The guns had a muzzle velocity of 2,700 feet per second (820 m/s) and a range of 14,600 yards (13,400 m) at a 45° angle. The guns could fire 45 – 50 rounds per minute with a lifespan of 2,050 rounds. The guns were placed in a Mk 33 mount. The mounting allowed the guns to elevate from −15° to 85°. The elevation rate was 30° per second and train rate was 24° per second. The mount could train 360°.

For anti-submarine warfare, the ships were armed with a Mk 10 Limbo mortar. The Limbo was a British-designed three-barrel mortar capable of launching a projectile shell between 400–1,000 yards (370–910 m). Placed on stabilized mountings, the projectiles always entered the water at the same angle. The total weight of the shell was 390 pounds (180 kg). They also had a Mk.4 thrower with homing torpedoes.

Initially the ships were outfitted with one SPS-12 air search radar, one SPS-10B surface search radar, and one Sperry Mk.2 navigation radar. For sensing below the surface, the class was given one SQS-501 high frequency bottom profiler sonar, one SQS-502 high frequency mortar control sonar, one SQS-503 hull mounted active search sonar and one SQS-504 Variable Depth Sonar at medium frequency. For fire control purposes they were given one Mk 60 GFCS fire control with SPG-48 tracker (GUNAR).

The two Annapolis-class destroyers were built late enough to incorporate the helicopter hangar retrofitted to the St. Laurent class and the "Beartrap" haul-down device. This allowed the destroyer escorts to deploy with one CH-124 Sea King helicopter.

=== DELEX refit ===
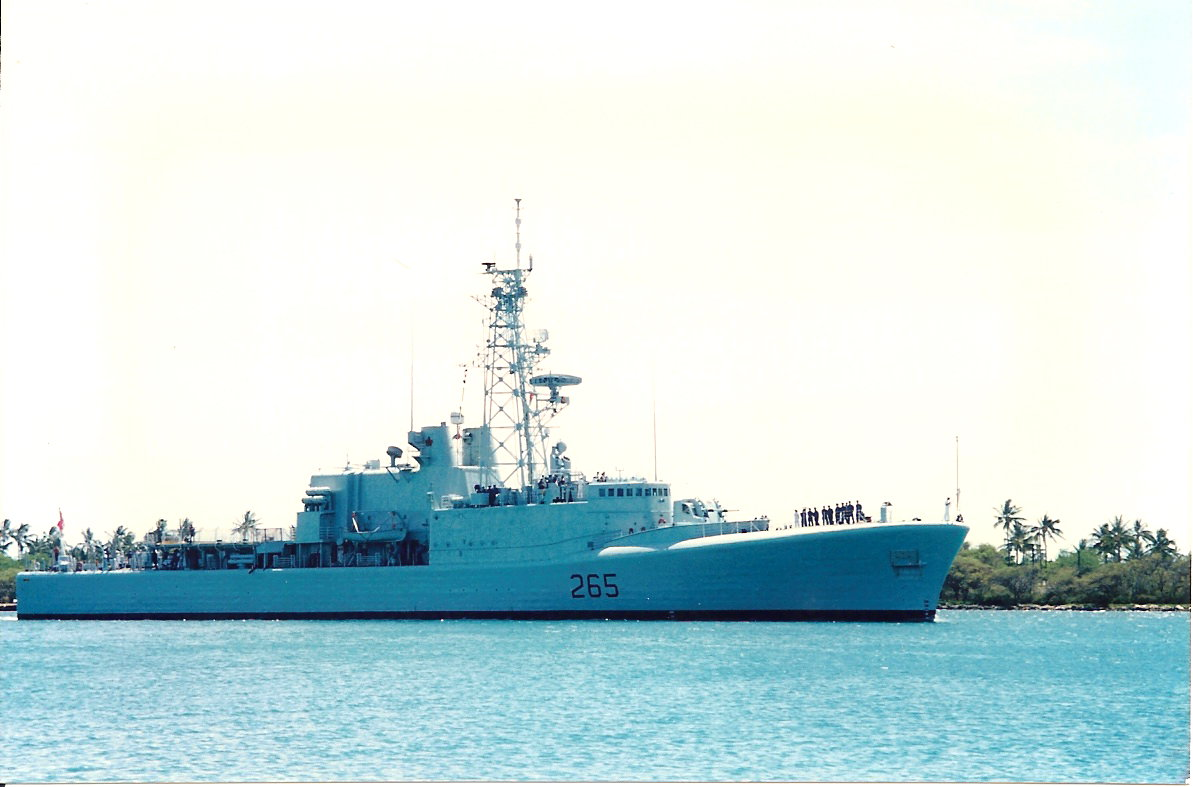
Annapolis in 1995 at Pearl Harbor. Note the large lattice mast

The DEstroyer Life EXtension (DELEX) refit was born out of the need to extend the life of the steam-powered destroyer escorts of the Canadian Navy in the 1980s until the next generation of surface ship was built. Encompassing all the classes based on the initial St. Laurent (the remaining St. Laurent, Restigouche, Mackenzie, and Annapolis-class vessels), the DELEX upgrades were meant to improve their ability to combat modern Soviet submarines, and to allow them to continue to operate as part of NATO task forces.

Nipigon underwent a DELEX refit in 1982 and Annapolis followed in 1984. The Annapolis class received the same sensor and communications upgrades that others in the St Laurent family of ships received, including the installation of a new tactical data system (ADLIPS), updated radars and sonars, fire control and satellite navigation. They also received the new Canadian Tactical Towed Array Sensor or CANTASS which was a long-range towed sonar array that was affixed to the stern, which replaced the older VDS. The class also received a new lattice mast. The AN/SPS-503 radar was installed, the AN/SPS-10D replaced the older, AN/SPS-10 model. The AN/SQS-502, AN/SQS-503 and SQS-10/11 sonars were removed and replaced by AN/SQS-505(V) in a fixed dome below the waterline. The installation of the two ADLIPS units allowed the vessels to better integrate into NATO units.

They were given 12.75-inch (324 mm) torpedo tubes to allow them to fire Mark 46 torpedoes. However, the Limbo mortar was removed in order to install the CANTASS. This visibly altered the overall appearance of the ships. The AN/SQR-504 was also replaced by the CANTASS. The Super RBOC chaff system was installed during the refit.

== Ships ==
Number	Name	Builder	Laid down	Launched	Commissioned	DELEX refit	Paid off	Fate
265	Annapolis	Halifax Shipyards Ltd., Halifax, Nova Scotia	2 September 1961	27 April 1963	19 December 1964	15 September 1986	15 November 1996	Scuttled off Gambier Island in 2015.
266	Nipigon	Marine Industries Ltd., Sorel, Quebec	5 August 1960	10 December 1961	30 May 1964	22 August 1984	7 July 1998	Scuttled off Rimouski, Quebec in 2003.

== Service history ==
Nipigon was laid down by Marine Industries Ltd on 5 August 1960 and Annapolis by Halifax Shipyards on 2 September 1961. Both ships commissioned in 1964; Nipigon on 30 May and Annapolis on 19 December.

Both ships spent the majority of their career split between Canada's Pacific and Atlantic coasts with the Annapolis being at Esquimalt and Nipigon at Halifax. They spent most of their careers participating in training exercises, such as Ocean Safari '87 or representing Canada at ceremonial situations, such as commemorating the Battle of the Atlantic in May 1993 at Liverpool.

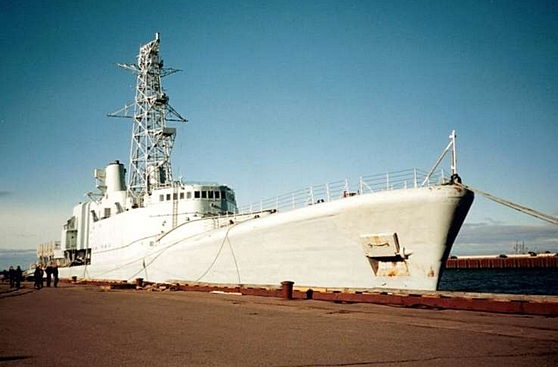
Nipigon awaiting her fate in Rimouski harbour

In 1994, Annapolis participated in Operation Forward Action off Haiti. In 1995, after illegal fishing had taken place in Canada's exclusive economic zone, Nipigon was sent to support Canadian Coast Guard and Fisheries vessels in apprehending the perpetrators, in what became called the Turbot War.

Nipigon remained in the fleet until 1998 as a trials ship for the ETASS Mod 5 towed sonar system which was a precursor to the CANTASS that is currently fitted on the Halifax class of frigates. Both Annapolis and Nipigon were paid off on 1 July 1998. Nipigon was towed to Rimouski, Quebec and sunk as an artificial reef off the coast. After years of court battles, Annapolis was sunk as an artificial reef off Gambier Island, British Columbia in 2015.

== See also ==
Equivalent destroyers of the same era

- Takatsuki class
- Halland class
- Friesland class
- Forrest Sherman class
- Daring class
- River class
- Kotlin class
