= HMCS Nipigon (DDH 266) =

Annapolis-class destroyer of the Royal Canadian Navy

Coordinates: 48°36′28.8″N 68°25′42.2″W

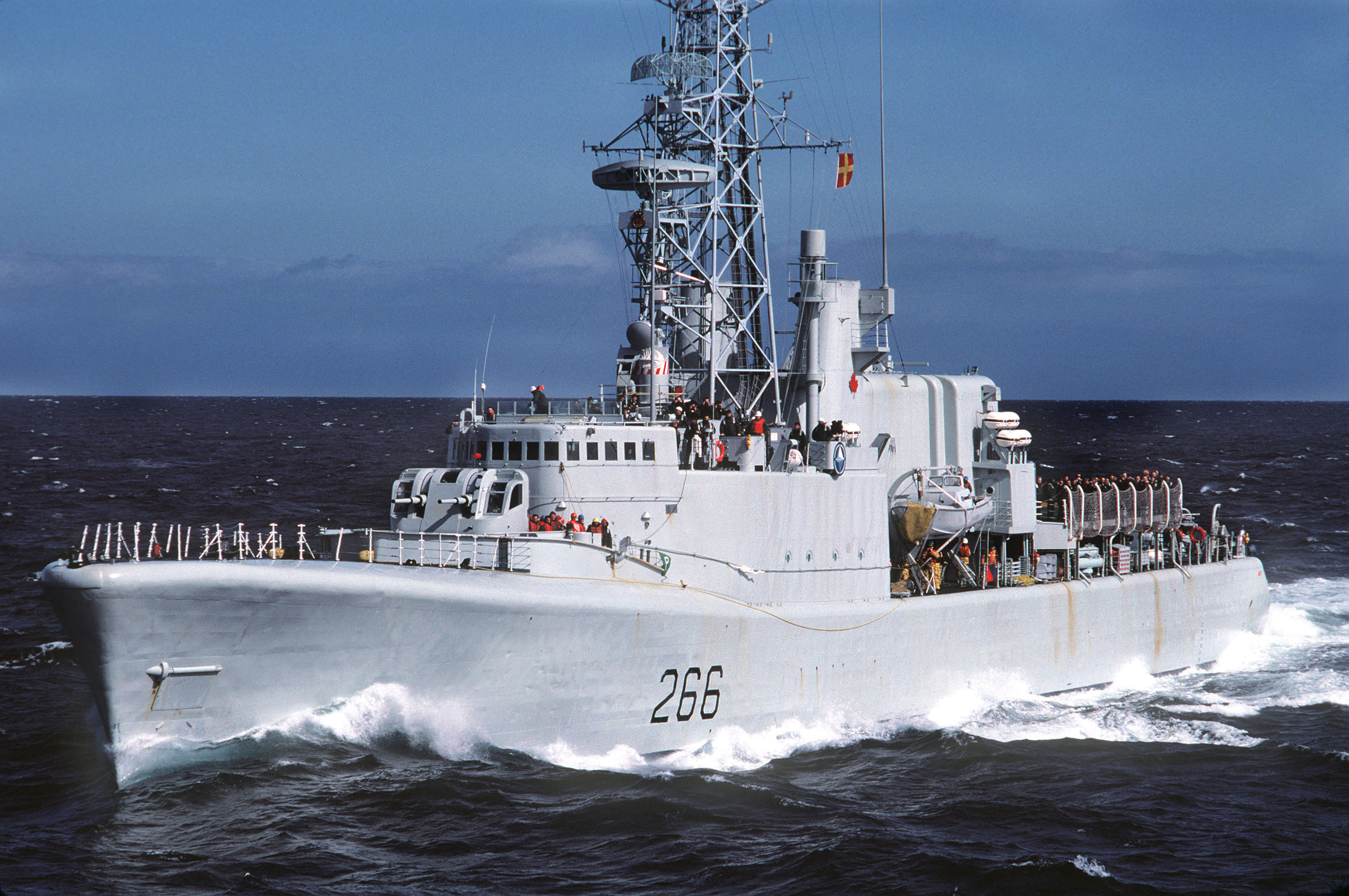
- HMCS Nipigon underway during NATO Exercise Ocean Safari '85.

History

Canada
- Name: Nipigon
- Namesake: Nipigon River, Ontario
- Ordered: 1958
- Builder: Marine Industries Ltd., Sorel
- Laid down: 5 August 1960
- Launched: 10 December 1961
- Commissioned: 30 May 1964
- Decommissioned: 2 July 1998
- Refit: 22 August 1984 (DELEX)
- Motto: "We are one"
- Honours and awards: Atlantic 1940–45, Gulf of St. Lawrence 1942, 1944.
- Fate: Sunk for an artificial reef north-east of Rimouski, Quebec in 2003.
- Badge: Gules, in a base a bar fesswise wavy argent charged with a like barrulet azure, out of which leaping two trout or, one to the dexter chief the other to the sinister chief.

General characteristics
- Class & type: Annapolis-class destroyer
- Displacement: 3,420 long tons (3,474.9 t) full load
- Length: 366 ft (111.6 m)
- Beam: 42 ft (12.8 m)
- Draught: 23.5 ft (7.2 m)
- Propulsion: 2-shaft English-Electric geared steam turbines; 2 Babcock & Wilcox boilers; 30,000 shp (22,000 kW)
- Speed: 28 kn (52 km/h; 32 mph)
- Complement: 228
- Sensors & processing systems: Original: 1 × SPS-12 air search radar; 1 × SPS-10B surface search radar; 1 × Sperry Mk.2 navigation radar; 1 × URN 20 TACAN radar; 1 × SQS-501 high frequency bottom profiler sonar; 1 × SQS-502 high frequency mortar control sonar; 1 × SQS-503 hull mounted active search sonar; 1 x SQS-11B hull mounted active scanning sonar; 1 × SQS-504 VDS medium frequency active search sonar; 1 × UQC-1B "Gertrude" underwater telephone; 1 × Mk 64 GFCS fire control with SPG-48 tracker (GUNAR); DELEX: 1 × Marconi SPS-503 air search radar; 1 × Raytheon/Sylvania SPS-502 surface search radar; 1 × Sperry Mk.127E navigation radar; 1 × URN 25 TACAN radar; 1 × SQS-510 hull mounted active search sonar; 1 × SQR-19(V) ETASS towed array sonar; 1 × UQC-1B "Gertrude" underwater telephone; 1 × Mk 64 GFCS fire control with SPG-515 tracker
- Electronic warfare & decoys: Original: 1 × ULQ-6 jammer; 1 × WLR-1C radar analyzer; 1 × UPD-501 radar detector; 1 × SRD-501 HF/DF; DELEX: 1 × SLQ-501 intercept (CANEWS); 1 × ULQ-6 jammer; 1 × SRD-501 HF/DF
- Armament: Original: 1 × FMC 3-inch/50 Mk.33 twin; 1 × Mk. NC 10 Limbo ASW mortar; 1 × Mk.4 thrower with homing torpedoes; DELEX: 1 × FMC 3-inch/50 Mk.33 twin; 2 × triple Mk.32 12.75-inch torpedo tubes firing Mk.44 or Mk.46 Mod 5 torpedoes
- Aircraft carried: 1 CH-124 Sea King ASW helicopter
- Aviation facilities: Midships helicopter deck and hangar with Beartrap.

HMCS Nipigon was an Annapolis-class destroyer that served in the Royal Canadian Navy and later the Canadian Forces. She was the second Canadian naval unit to carry this name. Entering service in 1964, she was named for the Nipigon River that flows through Ontario.

Nipigon served throughout the Cold War on the Atlantic coast of Canada. She was paid off in 1998 and sold for use as an artificial reef off the coast of Quebec.

== Design and description ==
The Royal Canadian Navy had intended to place a six ship order under the Mackenzie class of destroyer escorts; however, during the design phase, the last two vessels ordered were altered to the St. Laurent-class DDH design and were classed under the new Annapolis designation.

The ships measured 366 feet (112 m) in length, with a beam of 42 feet (13 m) and a draught of 13 feet 2 inches (4.01 m). (Note: Macpherson and Barrie have the ships at 371 feet long, and a draught of 13 feet 8 inches.) Initially, the ships displaced 2,400 tonnes (2,400 long tons) (Note: Macpherson and Barrie states that the displacement was 2,400 tons, while Conway's claims it was the same as the St. Laurent class, which was 2,000 tons.) and had a complement of 228. (Note: Macpherson and Barrie have the complement at 246. (12 officers and 234 enlisted))

The ships were powered by two Babcock & Wilcox boilers connected to the two-shaft English-Electric geared steam turbines providing 30,000 shaft horsepower (22,000 kW). This gave the ships a maximum speed of 28 knots (52 km/h; 32 mph).

The ships were initially armed with two 3-inch (76 mm)/50 caliber (Note: Caliber denotes the length of the barrel. In this case, 50 caliber means that the gun barrel is 50 times as long as it is in diameter) dual-purpose guns mounted in a single turret forward. The extra topweight of the helicopter required the return of the American Mk 33 3-inch gun over the heavier 3-inch/70 caliber guns used on the preceding class. The guns could fire 45 – 50 rounds per minute with a lifespan of 2,050 rounds. The guns were placed in a Mk 33 mount. The mounting allowed the guns to elevate from −15° to 85°. The elevation rate was 30° per second and train rate was 24° per second. The mounts could train 360°.

For anti-submarine warfare, the ships were armed with a Mk 10 Limbo mortar. The Limbo was a British-designed three-barrel mortar capable of launching a projectile shell between 400–1,000 yards (370–910 m). Placed on stabilized mountings, the projectiles always entered the water at the same angle. The total weight of the shell was 390 pounds (180 kg). They also had a Mk.4 thrower with homing torpedoes.

Initially the ships were outfitted with one SPS-12 air search radar, one SPS-10B surface search radar, and one Sperry Mk.2 navigation radar. For sensing below the surface, the class was given one SQS-501 high frequency bottom profiler sonar, one SQS-502 high frequency mortar control sonar, one SQS-503 hull mounted active search sonar and one SQS-504 VDS medium frequency active search sonar. For fire control purposes they were given one Mk 64 GFCS fire control with SPG-48 tracker (GUNAR).

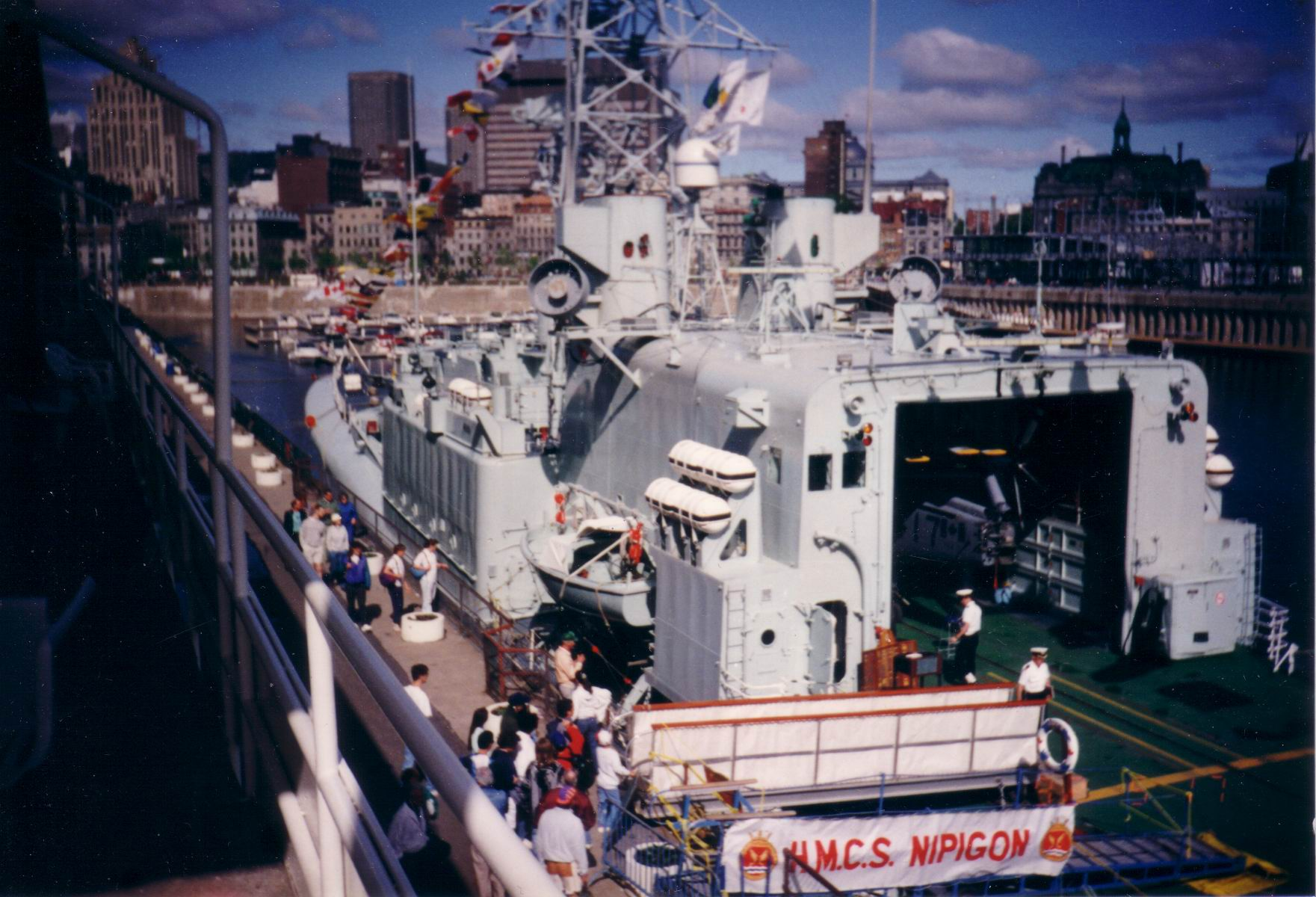
Close-up of the hangar bay

The two Annapolis-class destroyers were built late enough to incorporate the helicopter hangar retrofitted to the St. Laurent class and the "Beartrap" haul-down device. This allowed the destroyer escorts to deploy with one CH-124 Sea King helicopter.

=== DELEX refit ===
The DEstroyer Life EXtension (DELEX) refit was born out of the need to extend the life of the steam-powered destroyer escorts of the Canadian Navy in the 1980s until the next generation of surface ship was built. Encompassing all the classes based on the initial St. Laurent (the remaining St. Laurent, Restigouche, Mackenzie, and Annapolis-class vessels), the DELEX upgrades were meant to improve their ability to combat modern Soviet submarines, and to allow them to continue to operate as part of NATO task forces.

The Annapolis class received the same sensor and communications upgrades that others in the St Laurent family of ships received, including the installation of a new tactical data system (ADLIPS), updated radars and sonars, fire control and satellite navigation. They also received the new Canadian Tactical Towed Array Sensor or CANTASS which was a long-range towed sonar array that was affixed to the stern, which replaced the older VDS. The class also received a new lattice mast.

They were given 12.75-inch (324 mm) torpedo tubes to allow them to fire Mark 46 torpedoes. However, the Limbo mortar was removed in order to install the CANTASS. This visibly altered the overall appearance of the ships.

== Construction and career ==
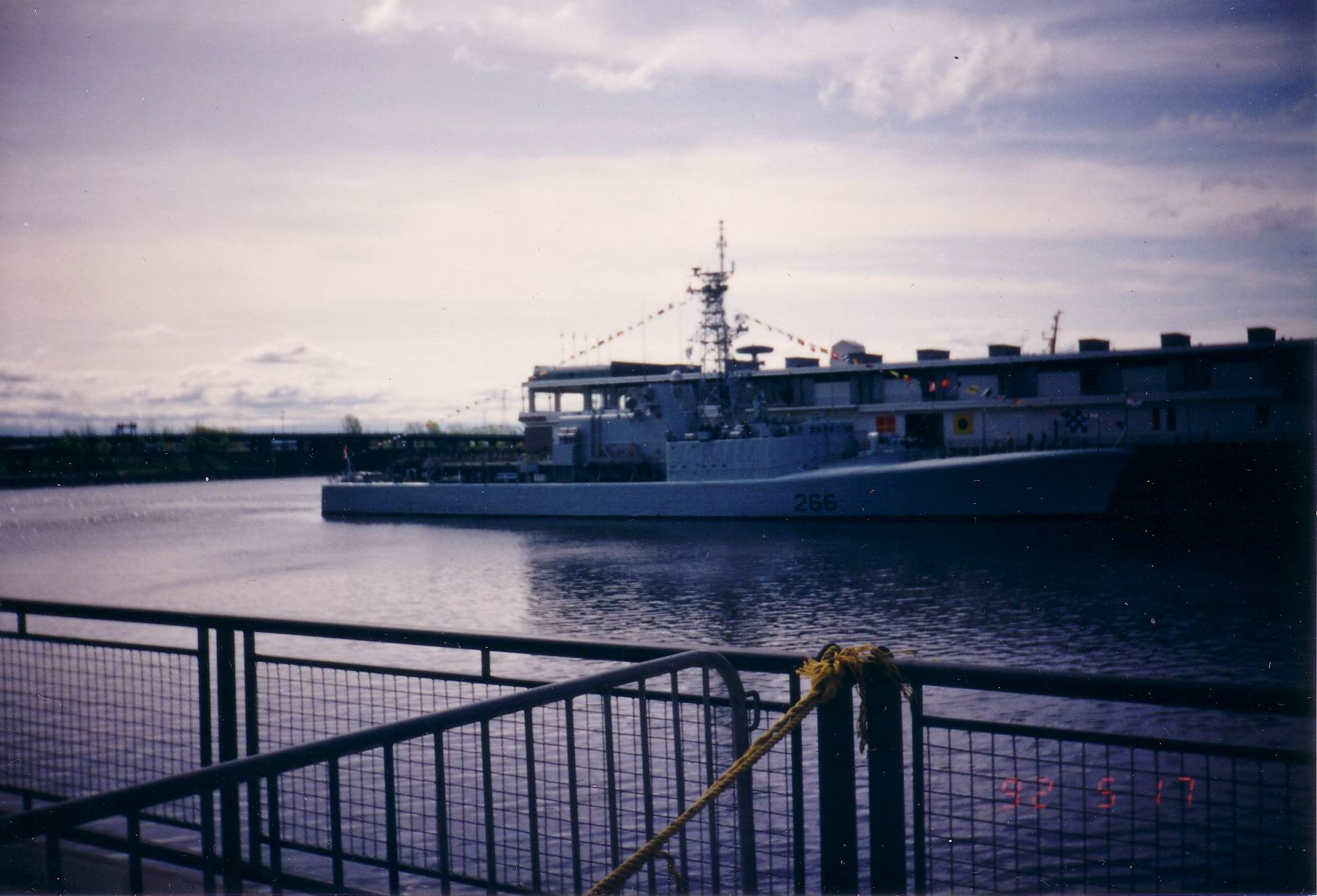
HMCS Nipigon docked at Montreal, Quebec in 1992

Nipigon was ordered in 1958, initially as a repeat Restigouche-class vessel. However, in 1959, the last two repeat Restigouches were altered to incorporate variable depth sonar and a helicopter landing area and became a separate class. The ship was laid down on 5 August 1960 by Marine Industries Ltd. at Sorel and launched on 10 December 1961. Her construction was overseen by Cdr Donald Clark CD, who also oversaw the laying-down and commencement of HMCS Bras d'Or. She was commissioned into the Royal Canadian Navy on 30 May 1964 with classification number 266 and with the wife of the then Governor-General Georges Vanier, Madame Pauline Vanier, as her sponsor. She was actually the first vessel to commission in the class. In 1964, the ship escorted the royal yacht HMY Britannia on its tour of Canada.

On 18 October 1965, a fire broke out in the fuel-handling room, killing one and seriously injuring others. Two injured sailors died in a Royal Navy hospital in Plymouth, England over the next three days. Eight crew members were evacuated to HMCS Bonaventure.

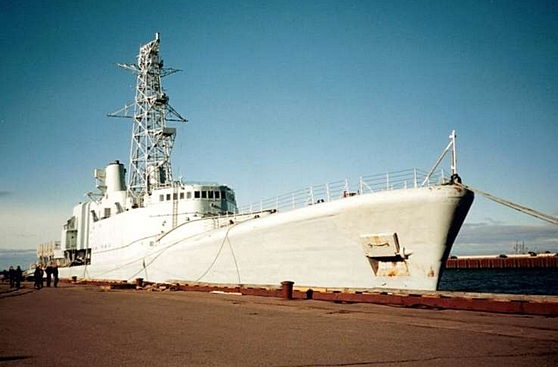
Nipigon awaiting her fate in Rimouski harbour, summer 2003

Nipigon served most of her career with the RCN and later Canadian Forces' Atlantic Fleet. During her service with Maritime Forces Atlantic (MARLANT), she was primarily used as a training ship. After the discovery of cracks in the boilers of HMCS Ottawa, all the Annapolis-class destroyers were temporarily taken out of service for an inspection in 1981. However, no cracks were discovered in Nipigon. In 1982, Nipigon was tasked with searching for and recovering any survivors from Ocean Ranger, a semi-submersible oil platform that had sunk in heavy seas. Nipigon's DELEX refit was performed by Davie Shipbuilding at Lauzon, taking place from 27 June 1983 to 22 August 1984 and cost $16 million.

On 28 April 1985, the warship shelled and sank the fishing trawler Lady Marjorie after it had been abandoned by its crew and became a hazard to navigation. Initially the decision was questioned, but Nipigon was later cleared by a Canadian Coast Guard report. In June 1985, Nipigon, while participating in naval exercises, suffered structural damage after a 15-metre (49 ft) stress crack sheared 215 rivets in the vessel's superstructure. The problem was not resolved until 1986. On 27 February 1987, her CH-124 helicopter rescued crewmen from the tug Gulf Gale which had caught fire off Cabo Rojo, Puerto Rico. The ship became the second to have a mixed-gender crew in the Canadian Forces in September 1987.

Nipigon underwent another refit, this time at Port Weller, Ontario beginning on 30 August 1988 and lasting to 16 February 1990. In August 1991, the destroyer was deployed to STANAVFORLANT, the standing NATO fleet. In May 1993, Nipigon took part in commemorative events remembering the Battle of the Atlantic in Liverpool and off the Welsh coast. In 1995, Nipigon was deployed into the Atlantic as a guard ship during the Turbot War. In June 1995, the destroyer intercepted the Spanish fishing vessel Patricia Nores, and boarded her just outside Canada's exclusive economic zone. Eleven tonnes of unrecorded turbot catch was found aboard Patricia Nores in a secret compartment.

She was decommissioned from the Canadian Forces on 2 July 1998 and sold for use as an artificial reef. She was sunk in the St. Lawrence River north-east of Rimouski, Quebec on 22 July 2003.
