= River-class destroyer escort =

Australian naval class (1961–68)

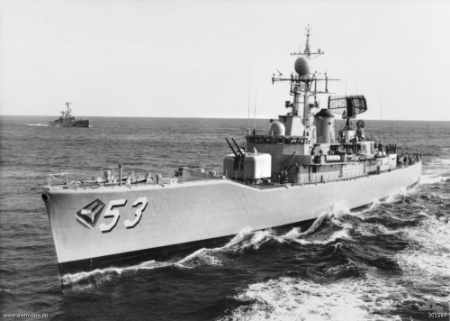
- Torrens, with Yarra in the background

Class overview
- Name: River
- Builders: Cockatoo Island Dockyard; Williamstown Naval Dockyard
- Operators: Royal Australian Navy
- Preceded by: Type 15-class frigate
- Succeeded by: Anzac-class frigate
- In commission: 1961–1998
- Completed: 6
- Scrapped: 3

General characteristics
- Type: Destroyer escort (previously anti-submarine frigate)

The River class was a class of six destroyer escorts (originally designated anti-submarine frigates) operated by the Royal Australian Navy (RAN). Plans to acquire four vessels, based on the British Type 12M (or Rothesay-class) frigate, began in the 1950s. The first two vessels had some slight modifications to the design, while the next two underwent further changes. Two more ships were ordered in 1964, following the Melbourne-Voyager collision; these were based on the Type 12I (or Leander-class) frigate.

By the 1990s, all six ships had left service. Two were sunk as part of tests, and a third was scuttled as an artificial reef, while the other three ships were scrapped.

== Design and construction ==
In August 1950, the Australian government announced plans to acquire a new class of anti-submarine warfare frigates, based on the British Type 12M (or Rothesay-class) frigate design. Originally six were planned, with construction to be split between Cockatoo Island Dockyard in Sydney and Williamstown Naval Dockyard in Melbourne, but only four were approved. The first two ships, Parramatta and Yarra, were based directly on the Rothesay class, with changes to fire control system, air warning radar, and habitability to meet RAN operating conditions. The second pair, Stuart and Derwent, were modified to carry the Type 199 variable depth sonar over the stern; the Type 199 was unsuccessful and later removed.

In 1964, the aircraft carrier Melbourne collided with the destroyer Voyager, resulting in the destroyer's sinking. In order to replace the lost capability, the Australian government ordered another two River-class ships, Swan and Torrens. Unlike the previous four, the new ships were based on the more advanced Type 12I (or Leander-class) design.

The ships had a displacement of 2,150 tons at standard load and 2,700 tons at full load. They were 370 ft. (113m) long, had a beam of 41 ft. (12.5m), and a draught of 13 ft. (3.9 m). Propulsion was provided by two double-reduction geared turbines, which supplied 30,000 shaft horsepower (22,000 kW) to two propeller shafts, allowing the vessels to reach 30 knots (56 km/h; 35 mph). Maximum range was 3,400 nautical miles (6,300 km; 3,900 mi) at 12 knots (22 km/h; 14 mph). The ship's company consisted of 250 personnel.

Weapons fit for the first four ships at commissioning consisted of two 4.5 inch Mark 6 guns in a single twin turret, two 40 mm Bofors in a twin mount, and two Limbo anti-submarine mortars. During the 1960s, a quadruple Sea Cat anti-aircraft missile launcher was fitted in place of the Bofors, and one of the Limbo mortars was removed in favour of an Ikara missile launcher. Stuart was the first RAN ship fitted with Ikara, and Derwent the first to carry Sea Cat. In the early 1990s, the missile systems were removed from all active Rivers, with an Army RBS 70 unit available for use if required.

== Operational history ==
During their careers, the River-class ships spent most of their time in Australian waters or on multinational exercises, but were regularly deployed to the Far East Strategic Reserve, and saw service during the Indonesia-Malaysia Confrontation.

During 1967 and 1968, Stuart and Yarra were used to escort the troop transport HMAS Sydney on voyages to Vietnam.

During the mid-1970s, Yarra underwent a half-life refit, which included the removal of her remaining Limbo, and installation of a Mulloka sonar. Parramatta underwent a more extensive modernisation during the late 1970s, with a new fire control system, modification of the boilers and electrical system, and habitability improvements. Stuart and Derwent underwent similar modernisations between 1979 and 1985. Modernisation was planned for Swan and Torrens during the mid-1980s, but a lack of funding meant that the ships only underwent a half-life refit.

At the start of 1984, Stuart became the first RAN vessel permanently assigned to HMAS Stirling, the new base in Western Australia.

In 1992, reports of sexual harassment aboard Swan prompted investigations by the Australian Defence Force and a Senate committee review.

== Decommissioning and fate ==
Yarra was decommissioned on 22 November 1985. There were plans to keep her in service as a training vessel, but the decision was to keep HMAS Vampire active in this role, and Yarra was placed in reserve. The other ships of the class were decommissioned during the 1990s.

Derwent was sunk during explosives testing in 1994. Swan was scuttled as an artificial reef in 1997. Torrens was torpedoed by the Collins-class submarine Farncomb during a weapons test in 1999. The other three ships were broken up for scrap.

== Specifications ==
Note: although these ships are grouped together as a single class, there were many significant differences between the first two units, Yarra and Parramatta (Type 12M), the second two units, Stuart and Derwent (modified Type 12M) and the final two units, Swan and Torrens (Type 12I).

	Type 12M	Type 12I Batch III
Displacement	2,560 tons	2,790 tons
Dimensions	113 metres (371 ft) (length); 12.5 metres (41 ft) (beam); 3.9 metres (13 ft) (draught)	113.3 metres (372 ft) (length); 13.1 metres (43 ft) (beam); 4.5 metres (15 ft) (draught)
Armament	1 x 2 4.5 inch (113 mm) Mark 6 guns 2 x Limbo anti-submarine mortars^{1}	1 x 2 4.5 inch (113 mm) Mark 6 guns 1 x quad Seacat SAM launcher 1 x Limbo mortar 1 x Ikara ASW system
Propulsion	2 x English Electric steam turbines; 2 shaft; 30,000 shp	2 x English Electric steam turbines; 2 shaft; 30,000 shp
Speed	31.9 knots	30 knots

- ^1: All four of the Type 12M units were refitted with both the Seacat and Ikara missile systems, replacing 40 mm AA guns and Limbo mortars. During refits in the 1980s the Ikara and Seacat systems were removed and 2x Mark 32 triple torpedo launchers were added to all 5 remaining ships (Yarra was scrapped in 1985). Along with this, the 3 newest ships (Derwent, Swan & Torrens) also got mounts for a removable RBS-70 laser guided missile system. (Parramatta and Stuart were due to be decommissioned in 1991, so were not given the RBS-70's due to their limited remaining service life.)

== Ships ==
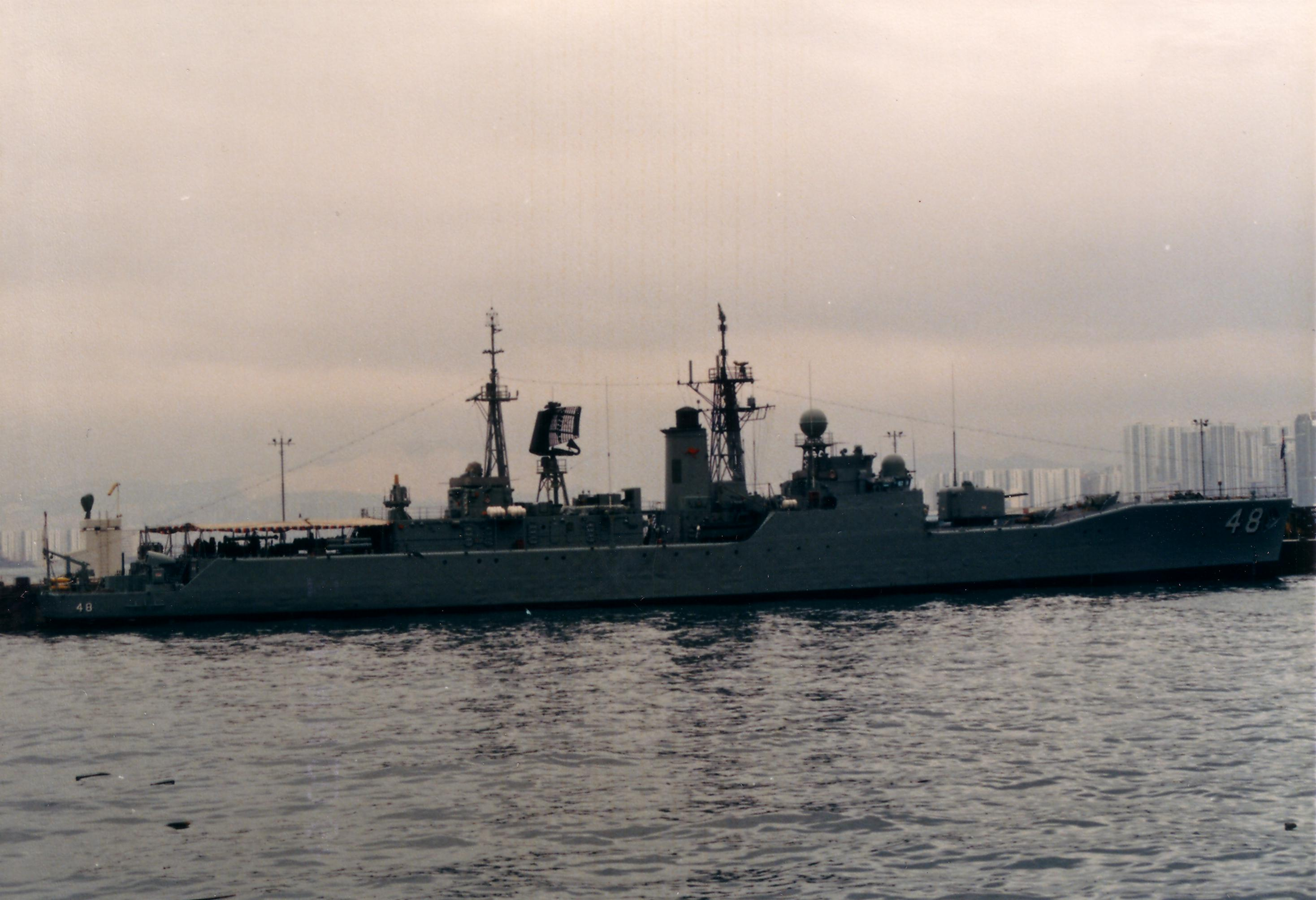
Stuart in Hong Kong Harbour in 1989

Name	Builder	Launched	Commissioned	Decommissioned	Status
Type 12M
Yarra	Williamstown Naval Dockyard, Melbourne	30 September 1958	27 July 1961	22 November 1985	Broken up at Alang, 1985
Parramatta	Cockatoo Island, Sydney	31 January 1959	14 July 1961	11 November 1991	Broken up at Karachi, 1991
Stuart	Cockatoo Island, Sydney	8 April 1961	28 June 1963	26 July 1991	Broken up at Alang, 1992
Derwent	Williamstown Naval Dockyard, Melbourne	17 April 1961	30 April 1964	8 August 1994	Scuttled as artificial reef, 21 December 1994
Type 12I
Swan	Williamstown Naval Dockyard, Melbourne	16 December 1967	20 January 1970	13 September 1996	Scuttled as artificial reef, 14 December 1997
Torrens	Cockatoo Island, Sydney	28 September 1968	19 January 1971	11 September 1998	Sunk as test target, 14 June 1999
