= HMCS Chaudière =

Several Canadian naval units have been named HMCS Chaudiere.

- HMCS Chaudiere (H99) (I) was a River-class destroyer originally commissioned as HMS Hero (H99) until transfer to the Royal Canadian Navy in 1943.
- HMCS Chaudière (DDE 235) (II) was a Restigouche-class destroyer escort that served in the Royal Canadian Navy and the Canadian Forces during the Cold War.

== Battle honours ==
- Atlantic 1944
- Normandy 1944
- Biscay 1944
