= HMCS St. Croix =

Two ships of the Canadian navy have been named HMCS St. Croix.

- HMCS St. Croix (I81) (I) was a Town-class destroyer that was originally commissioned as USS McCook (DD-252) until transfer to the Royal Canadian Navy in 1940 by way of the Royal Navy.
- HMCS St. Croix (DDE 256) (II) was a Restigouche-class destroyer that served in the RCN from 1958 to unification in 1968 and thence in the Canadian Forces Maritime Command from 1968 until 1974.

== Battle honours ==
- Atlantic 1940–43
