= HMCS Restigouche (DDE 257) =

Destroyer of the Royal Canadian Navy

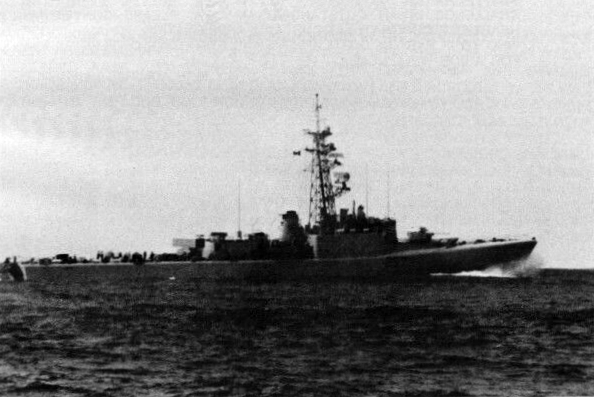
- HMCS Restigouche under way in 1983

History

Canada
- Name: Restigouche
- Namesake: Restigouche River
- Builder: Canadian Vickers, Montreal
- Laid down: 15 July 1953
- Launched: 22 November 1954
- Commissioned: 7 June 1958
- Decommissioned: 31 August 1994
- Identification: 257
- Motto: Rester droit ("Steer a straight course")
- Nickname(s): "Rusty Guts"
- Honours and awards: Atlantic 1939–45; North Sea 1940; Mediterranean 1943; Normandy 1944; Biscay 1944
- Fate: Sunk off Mexico in 11 June 2001 15°00′00″N 95°00′00″W
- Badge: Blazon Or, the head of a five pronged fish-spear erect, azure.

General characteristics (as built)
- Class & type: Restigouche-class destroyer
- Displacement: 2800 tonnes (deep load)
- Length: 366 ft (111.6 m)
- Beam: 42 ft (12.8 m)
- Draught: 14 ft (4.3 m)
- Installed power: 2 x Babcock & Wilcox boilers; 30,000 shp (22,000 kW)
- Propulsion: 2-shaft English-Electric geared steam turbines,
- Speed: 28 knots (51.9 km/h)
- Range: 4,750 nautical miles (8,797.0 km) at 14 knots (25.9 km/h)
- Complement: 249
- Sensors & processing systems: 1 × SPS-12 air search radar; 1 × SPS-10B surface search radar; 1 × Sperry Mk.2 navigation radar; 1 × SQS-501 high frequency bottom profiler sonar; 1 × SQS-502 high frequency mortar control sonar; 1 × SQS-503 hull mounted active search sonar; 1 × SQS-10 hull mounted active search sonar; 1 × Mk.69 gunnery control system with SPG-48 director forward; GUNAR Mk.64 GFCS with on-mount SPG-48 director aft
- Electronic warfare & decoys: 1 × DAU HF/DF (high frequency direction finder)
- Armament: 1 × 3-inch/70 Mk.6 Vickers twin mount forward; 1 × 3-inch/50 Mk.33 FMC twin mount aft; 2 × Mk NC 10 Limbo ASW mortars; 2 × single Mk.2 "K-gun" launchers with homing torpedoes

HMCS Restigouche was the lead ship of the Restigouche-class destroyers that served in the Royal Canadian Navy and later the Canadian Forces. Commissioned in 1958, Restigouche remained in service until 1994. She was sold for use as an artificial reef, however controversy arose over her acquisition and instead she was scuttled off the coast of Mexico in 2001. She was the second Canadian warship to carry the name HMCS Restigouche.

== Design and description ==
Based on the preceding St. Laurent-class design, the Restigouches had the same hull and propulsion, but different weaponry. Initially the St. Laurent class had been planned to be 14 ships. However the order was halved, and the following seven were redesigned to take into improvements made on the St. Laurents. As time passed, their design diverged further from that of the St. Laurents.

The ships had a displacement of 2,000 tonnes (2,000 long tons), 2,500 t (2,500 long tons) at deep load. They were designed to be 112 metres (366 ft) long with a beam of 13 metres (42 ft) and a draught of 4.01 metres (13 ft 2 in). The Restigouches had a complement of 214.

The Restigouches were by powered by two English Electric geared steam turbines, each driving a propeller shaft, using steam provided by two Babcock & Wilcox boilers. They generated 22,000 kilowatts (30,000 shp) giving the vessels a maximum speed of 28 knots (52 km/h; 32 mph).

The Restigouches were equipped with SPS-10, SPS-12, Sperry Mk 2 and SPG-48 radar along with SQS-501 and SQS-503 sonar.

=== Armament ===
The Restigouches diverged from the St. Laurents in their weaponry. The Restigouches were equipped with two twin mounts of Vickers 3-inch (76 mm)/70 calibre Mk 6 dual-purpose guns forward and maintained a single twin mount of 3-inch/50 calibre Mk 22 guns aft used in the preceding class. (Note: Calibre denotes the length of the barrel. In this case, 50 calibre means that the gun barrel is 50 times as long as it is in diameter) A Mk 69 fire control director was added to control the new guns. They were also armed with two Limbo Mk 10 mortars and two single Bofors 40 mm guns. However the 40 mm guns were dropped in the final design. The 3 in/70 mounting was placed in the 'A' position and the 3 in/50 mounting was placed in the 'Y' position.

The destroyers were also equipped beginning in 1958 with Mk 43 homing torpedoes in an effort to increase the distance between the ships and their targets. The Mk 43 torpedo had a range of 4,100 metres (4,500 yd) at 15 knots (28 km/h; 17 mph). They were pitched over the side by a modified depth charge thrower.

=== Improved Restigouche Escorts (IRE) ===
As part of the 1964 naval program, the Royal Canadian Navy planned to improve the attack capabilities of the Restigouche class. Unable to convert the vessels to helicopter-carrying versions like the St. Laurents due to budget constraints, instead the Restigouches were to receive variable depth sonar (VDS) to improve their sonar range, placed on the stern, and the RUR-5 anti-submarine rocket (ASROC). The destroyers also received a stepped lattice mast. Called the Improved Restigouche Escorts (IRE), Terra Nova was the first to undergo conversion, beginning in May 1965. The conversion took ten months to complete, followed by sea trials. The sea trials delayed the conversion of the next ship for four years. By 1969, the budget for naval programs had been cut and only four out of the seven (Terra Nova, Restigouche, Gatineau and Kootenay) would get upgraded to IRE standards and the remaining three (Chaudière, Columbia, and St. Croix) were placed in reserve.

The ASROC launcher replaced the 3 in/50 cal twin mount and one Mk 10 Limbo mortars aft. The ASROC was rocket-propelled acoustically-guided Mk 44 torpedo that had a minimum range of 820 metres (900 yd) and a maximum range of 9,100 metres (10,000 yd).

=== Destroyer Life Extension (DELEX) ===
The Destroyer Life Extension (DELEX) refit for the four surviving Restigouches was announced in 1978. An effort by Maritime Command to update their existing stock of naval escorts, the DELEX program affected 16 ships in total and came in several different formats depending on the class of ship it was being applied to. On average, the DELEX refit cost $24 million per ship. For the Restigouches this meant updating their sensor, weapon and communications systems. The class received the new ADLIPS tactical data system, new radar and fire control systems and satellite navigation. They were also fitted with a triple torpedo tube mounting to use the new Mk 46 torpedo. The ships began undergoing their DELEX refits in the early 1980s. However, by the time the ships emerged from their refits, they were already obsolete as the Falklands War had changed the way surface battles were fought.

=== Gulf War refit ===
With the advent of the Gulf War in August 1990, Maritime Command was asked to have a fleet of ships available to send to the Persian Gulf, preferably three ships. The Iroquois-class destroyer Athabaskan and the replenishment ship Protecteur would be made part of the task force, however all the other Iroquois-class vessels were in refit. Maritime Command chose from among the remaining fleet the vessel with the best electronic countermeasures suite, Terra Nova, to deploy with the task force. Terra Nova was quickly altered to make her ready for an active war zone. The ship's ASROC system was landed and instead two quad Harpoon surface-to-surface missile system was installed. A Mk 15 Phalanx close-in weapon system was placed on the quarterdeck in place of the landed Limbo ASW mortar and two 40 mm/60 calibre Boffin guns were installed in single mounts where the ship's boats were. The ship was also fitted with new chaff, electronic and communications systems. Restigouche received a similar refit before deploying as Terra Nova's intended replacement in the Persian Gulf in 1991.

== Service history ==
Restigouche, named for a river that flows through Quebec and New Brunswick, was laid down on 15 July 1953 by Canadian Vickers Ltd., in Montreal, Quebec. The ship was launched on 22 November 1954. While still on sea trials by the builder, Restigouche collided with the freighter Manchester Port on 21 November 1957 in the Saint Lawrence River. The ship suffered damage to her portside superstructure and hull. Restigouche was commissioned at Montreal on 7 June 1958 with the number DDE 257. In June 1959, Restigouche took part in the opening of the Saint Lawrence Seaway.

In 1961, Restigouche was the lead ship of the Fifth Canadian Escort Squadron. From 10–18 April, she took part in NATO naval exercises off the Canadian Atlantic coast. In February 1964, Restigouche was a member of the "Matchmaker" squadron, the predecessor of STANAVFORLANT and took part in naval exercises off Gibraltar.

In 1966, with the restructuring of the Royal Canadian Navy into Maritime Command, Restigouche was assigned to the Third Canadian Escort Squadron.

The destroyer escort was selected for the IRE program and underwent the modernization beginning in 1970 at Halifax Shipyards. She returned to active duty on 12 May 1972 and was transferred to the west coast, arriving at CFB Esquimalt on 2 August 1973.

In August 1984, Restigouche was sent to track the Soviet spy ship Semen Chelyushkin 100 kilometres (62 mi) of Cape Flattery. However, Restigouche only had one turbine working as a defect had been found in its port side turbine at the time. Following that incident, the destroyer escort was taken in hand for her DELEX refit, which began on 3 December 1984. The ship returned to service on 29 November 1985.

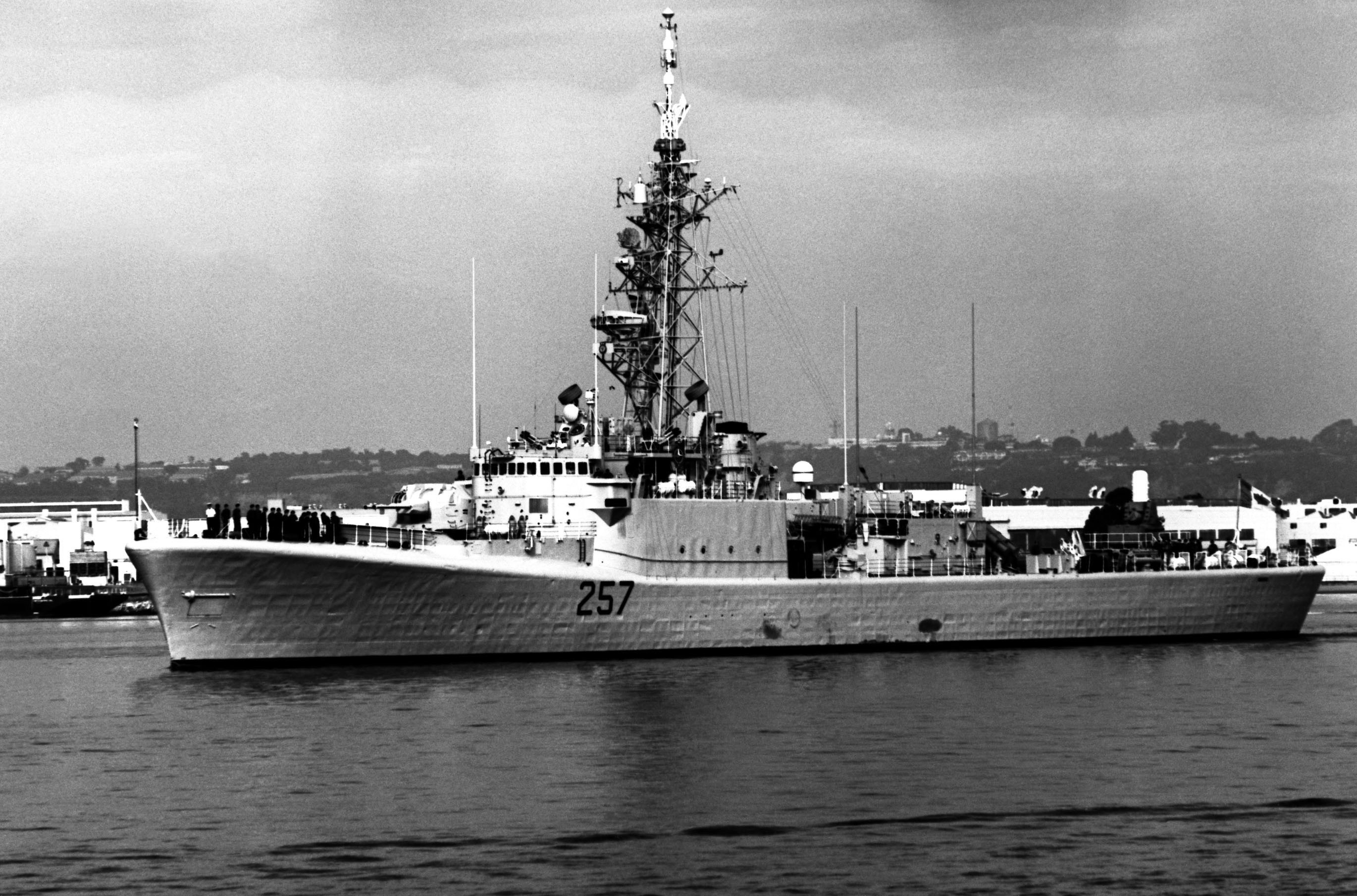
Restigouche in 1992, with Phalanx CIWS and Harpoon missile launchers aft.

In early 1991, Restigouche was upgraded with a Gulf War refit in preparation for relieving sister ship Terra Nova on station in the Persian Gulf in March 1991. However, before the ship could arrive in the Middle East, the war ended. Restigouche was then redirected to the Atlantic where she deployed as part of NATO's Standing Naval Force Atlantic, the first west coast-based ship to do so. On 24 February 1992, Restigouche was dispatched to the Red Sea as part of a force intended to respond if Iraq resumed hostilities. The destroyer escort arrived in the Red Sea on 18 April and was assigned the job of inspecting all the shipping going into the port of Aqaba. While performing these duties, she became the first Canadian warship to make official visits to Saudi Arabia and Israel. Her duties ended on 4 July and returned to Esquimalt on 18 August.

Restigouche was paid off on 31 August 1994. In November 2000, she, along with sister ship Kootenay, was towed to Mexico for use as an artificial reef. The acquisition of Restigouche and Kootenay for use as artificial reefs became a source of controversy in Mexico. Restigouche and Kootenay were purchased by businessmen Carlos Estrabeau and Josefat Cortés, for $160,000 from the Artificial Reef Society of British Columbia (ARSBC) after the two men were inspired by ARSBC's work with other former Canadian ships off the coast of British Columbia. Supported by their government, controversy arose after an investigation by the Acapulco-based newspaper La Jornada El Sur found that $100,000 of the total amount paid for the destroyer escorts had come from a government anti-poverty fund. Dubbed "Reefgate", it was later found that the owners did not have the permits to create an artificial reef and were fined by the government. The former destroyer escort was sunk off Acapulco on 11 June 2001. The ship was towed 3.2 kilometres (2 mi) into Acapulco Bay and scuttled in 18 metres (60 ft) of water by the government who feared that the derelict ship would become a navigational hazard during the hurricane season.

=== Ship's bell ===
The Christening Bells Project at Canadian Forces Base Esquimalt Naval and Military Museum includes information from the ship's bell of Restigouche, which was used for baptism of babies on board ship. The bell is currently held by the Royal Canadian Legion, Lantzville, British Columbia. The bell contains christenings and marriages 1941–1979.
