= HMCS Kootenay =

Several Canadian naval units have been named HMCS Kootenay.

- HMCS Kootenay (H75) (I) was formerly HMS Decoy (H75) an ex-Royal Navy escort destroyer, which served in the Royal Canadian Navy from 1943 to 1945, and was broken up in 1946
- HMCS Kootenay (DDE 258) (II) was a Restigouche-class destroyer which served from 1959 to 1995

== Battle honours ==
- Atlantic, 1943–45
- Normandy, 1944
- English Channel, 1944
- Biscay, 1944

== See also ==
- Kootenay (disambiguation)

HMCS Kootenay (H75), along with HMCS Ottawa (H60) and HMCS Chaudire (H99) served together from 1943 to 1944 on North Atlantic Convoy escort duties. When the invasion of Normandy was underway, they were based in Plymouth, England, to attack German surface ships and submarines. The group was credited with sinking three German U-Boats (U678, U984 and U621). They also had running battles with German E-Boats (fast attack boats) and shelled coastal installations in the Bay of Biscay. They had a close call when a German shore battery opened up on them and straddled the ship. They made smoke and escaped at top speed. At the end of the war, they made several Atlantic crossings bringing service personnel home.
