= HMCS St. Croix (DDE 256) =

Destroyer of the Royal Canadian Navy

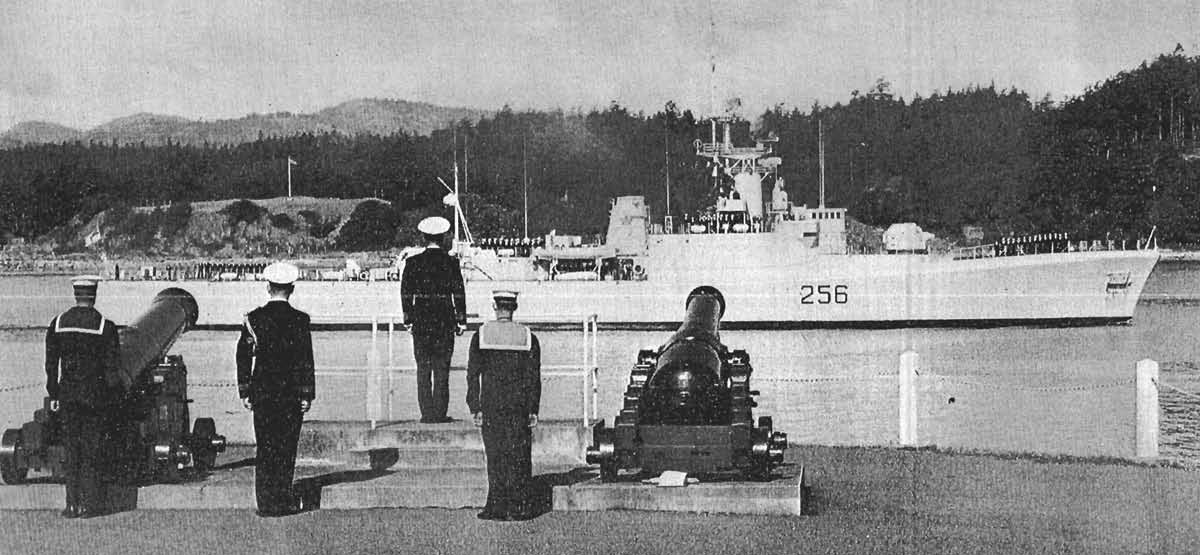
- HMCS St. Croix arriving at CFB Esquimalt in August 1964

History

Canada
- Name: St. Croix
- Namesake: St. Croix River
- Builder: Marine Industries Ltd., Sorel
- Laid down: 15 October 1954
- Launched: 17 November 1957
- Commissioned: 4 October 1958
- Decommissioned: 15 November 1974
- Home port: CFB Esquimalt
- Identification: DDE 256
- Motto: "Stand, fight, yield not"
- Honours and awards: Atlantic 1940–43
- Fate: Disposed and broken up in 1991.
- Badge: Argent, a cross wavy azure charged with a similar one argent issuing from between the arms of the cross saltirewise four maple leaves, gules

General characteristics
- Class & type: Restigouche-class destroyer
- Displacement: 2,800 tonnes (2,800 long tons; 3,100 short tons) (deep load)
- Length: 366 ft (111.6 m)
- Beam: 42 ft (12.8 m)
- Draught: 14 ft (4.3 m)
- Propulsion: 2-shaft English-Electric geared steam turbines; 2 Babcock & Wilcox boilers; 30,000 shp (22,000 kW)
- Speed: 28 knots (52 km/h; 32 mph)
- Range: 4,750 nautical miles (8,800 km; 5,470 mi) at 14 knots (26 km/h; 16 mph)
- Complement: 214
- Sensors & processing systems: 1 × SPS-12 air search radar; 1 × SPS-10B surface search radar; 1 × Sperry Mk.2 navigation radar; 1 × SQS-501 high frequency bottom profiler sonar; 1 × SQS-502 high frequency mortar control sonar; 1 × SQS-503 hull mounted active search sonar; 1 × SQS-10 hull mounted active search sonar; 1 × Mk.69 gunnery control system with SPG-48 director forward; GUNAR (Mk.64 GFCS with on-mount SPG-48 director) aft
- Electronic warfare & decoys: 1 × DAU HF/DF (high frequency direction finder)
- Armament: 1 × 3-inch/70 Mk.6 Vickers twin mount forward; 1 × 3-inch/50 Mk.33 FMC twin mount aft; 2 × Mk NC 10 Limbo ASW mortars; 2 × single Mk.2 "K-gun" launchers with homing torpedoes

HMCS St. Croix was a Restigouche-class destroyer that served in the Royal Canadian Navy and later the Canadian Forces from 1958 to 1974. The fourth ship commissioned in the class, she was the second ship to bear the name. Following her decommissioning, the ship was used as a training ship at Halifax, Nova Scotia until 1991, when St. Croix was sold for scrapping.

== Design and description ==
Based on the preceding St. Laurent-class design, the Restigouches had the same hull and propulsion, but different weaponry. Initially the St. Laurent class had been planned to be 14 ships. However the order was halved, and the following seven were redesigned to take into improvements made on the St. Laurents. As time passed, their design diverged further from that of the St. Laurents.

The ships had a displacement of 2,000 tonnes (2,000 long tons), 2,500 t (2,500 long tons) at deep load. They were designed to be 112 metres (366 ft) long with a beam of 13 metres (42 ft) and a draught of 4.01 metres (13 ft 2 in). The Restigouches had a complement of 214.

The Restigouches were by powered by two English Electric geared steam turbines, each driving a propeller shaft, using steam provided by two Babcock & Wilcox boilers. They generated 22,000 kilowatts (30,000 shp) giving the vessels a maximum speed of 28 knots (52 km/h; 32 mph).

The Restigouches were equipped with SPS-10, SPS-12, Sperry Mk 2 and SPG-48 radar along with SQS-501 and SQS-503 sonar.

=== Armament ===
The Restigouches diverged from the St. Laurents in their weaponry. The Restigouches were equipped with two twin mounts of Vickers 3-inch (76 mm)/70 calibre Mk 6 dual-purpose guns forward and maintained a single twin mount of 3-inch/50 calibre Mk 22 guns aft used in the preceding class. (Note: Calibre denotes the length of the barrel. In this case, 50 calibre means that the gun barrel is 50 times as long as it is in diameter) A Mk 69 fire control director was added to control the new guns. They were also armed with two Limbo Mk 10 mortars and two single Bofors 40 mm guns. However the 40 mm guns were dropped in the final design.

The destroyers were also equipped beginning in 1958 with Mk 43 homing torpedoes in an effort to increase the distance between the ships and their targets. The Mk 43 torpedo had a range of 4,100 metres (4,500 yd) at 15 knots (28 km/h; 17 mph). They were pitched over the side by a modified depth charge thrower.

== Service history ==
St. Croix, named for a river in New Brunswick, was laid down on 15 October 1954 by Marine Industries at Sorel, Quebec. The ship was launched on 17 November 1956 and commissioned into the Royal Canadian Navy on 4 October 1958 with the classification DDE 256.

Following her commissioning, the ship was assigned to the Third Canadian Escort Squadron. In 1959 as a member of the Fifth Canadian Escort Squadron, St. Croix escorted the royal yacht HMY Britannia with Queen Elizabeth II aboard during her visit to Canada. The following year, with sister ships Terra Nova, Kootenay and Gatineau, she took part in the 500th anniversary of Prince Henry the Navigator's death off Lisbon.

In August 1964, St. Croix was transferred to the west coast. St. Croix, along with Columbia and Chaudière, was one of three Restigouche-class vessels not selected for modernization in the Improved Restigouche (IRE) project of the late 1960s. In 1966 St. Croix underwent shock testing off San Francisco.

In 1968, she was part of the Second Canadian Escort Squadron following the unification of the Canadian Armed Forces and creation of Maritime Command in 1967. In 1967 and 1969, the ship made long cruises across the Pacific, visiting Hawaii, Fiji, Australia and New Zealand. In 1973, the ship was reassigned to the east coast. She was paid off on 15 November 1974 at Halifax, Nova Scotia and placed in reserve as economies required by government reductions in authorized strength. The ship was disarmed and had her propellers removed. Her machinery spaces were converted into classrooms and the vessel was used as an engineering school ship from 1984 until 1990. The ship was sold in 1991 to Jacobson Metal of Chesapeake, Virginia and was towed from Halifax in April for scrapping.
