= HMCS Gatineau =

Two Canadian naval ships have been named HMCS Gatineau:

- HMCS Gatineau (H61) (I) was a former Royal Navy Interwar Standard E-class destroyer transferred to the Royal Canadian Navy for service in the Second World War.
- HMCS Gatineau (DDE 236) (II) was a Restigouche-class destroyer escort that served during the Cold War.

== Battle honours ==
- Atlantic 1943-44
- Normandy 1944
