= Restigouche =

Restigouche, deriving from the Míkmaq name Listuguj (in Francis-Smith orthography Listukuj), is the name of several geographic and political features in northern New Brunswick and neighbouring Quebec:

- HMCS Restigouche, two naval vessels
- Listuguj Mi'gmaq First Nation (formerly known as Restigouche)
- Restigouche (federal electoral district), a former Canadian federal electoral district
- Restigouche (provincial electoral district), a New Brunswick provincial electoral district
- Madawaska—Restigouche, a Canadian federal electoral district
- Restigouche County, New Brunswick
- Restigouche River
- Restigouche, a Míkmaq community in the Gaspe Peninsula of Quebec, Canada, across the Restigouche River from Campbellton, New Brunswick; see Listuguj Mi'gmaq First Nation
- Battle of Restigouche (1760), a naval battle during the French and Indian War
