= HMCS Gatineau (DDE 236) =

Destroyer of the Royal Canadian Navy

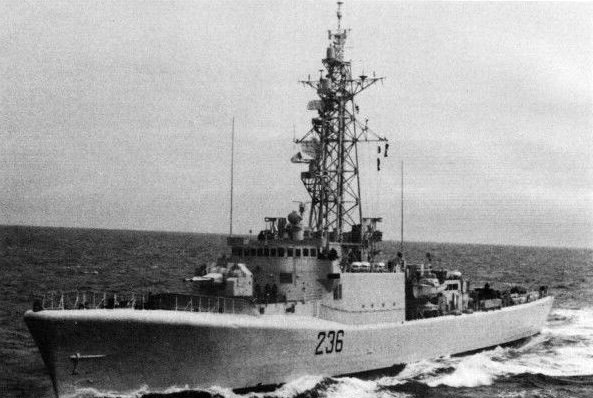
- HMCS Gatineau underway in 1983

History

Canada
- Name: Gatineau
- Namesake: Gatineau River
- Builder: Davie Shipbuilding, Lauzon
- Laid down: 30 April 1953
- Launched: 3 June 1957
- Commissioned: 17 February 1959
- Decommissioned: 24 May 1996
- Refit: 14 April 1971 (IRE); 12 November 1982 (DELEX)
- Home port: CFB Halifax
- Identification: DDE 236
- Motto: "In hoc catino postestas" (In this ship lies power)
- Honours and awards: Atlantic 1943–44, Normandy 1944
- Fate: Sold for scrapping, October 2009
- Badge: Vert, a bend wavy argent charged with two cotises bendlets azure, debruised with a sun in splendour or which is charged with a beaver sable.

General characteristics (as built)
- Class & type: Restigouche-class destroyer
- Displacement: 2800 t (deep load)
- Length: 366 ft (111.6 m)
- Beam: 42 ft (12.8 m)
- Draught: 14 ft (4.3 m)
- Propulsion: 2-shaft English-Electric geared steam turbines; 2 x Babcock & Wilcox boilers; 30,000 shp (22,000 kW)
- Speed: 28 knots (51.9 km/h)
- Range: 4,750 nautical miles (8,797.0 km) at 14 knots (25.9 km/h)
- Complement: 249
- Sensors & processing systems: 1 × SPS-12 air search radar; 1 × SPS-10B surface search radar; 1 × Sperry Mk.2 navigation radar; 1 × SQS-501 high frequency bottom profiler sonar; 1 × SQS-502 high frequency mortar control sonar; 1 × SQS-503 hull mounted active search sonar; 1 × SQS-10 hull mounted active search sonar; 1 × Mk.69 gunnery control system with SPG-48 director forward; 1 × GUNAR Mk.64 GFCS with on-mount SPG-48 director aft
- Electronic warfare & decoys: 1 × DAU HF/DF (high frequency direction finder)
- Armament: 1 × 3-inch/70 Mk.6 Vickers twin mount forward; 1 × 3-inch/50 Mk.33 FMC twin mount aft; 2 × Mk NC 10 Limbo ASW mortars; 2 × single Mk.2 "K-gun" launchers with homing torpedoes; 1 × 103 mm Bofors illumination rocket launchers

HMCS Gatineau was a Restigouche-class destroyer that served in the Royal Canadian Navy and later the Canadian Forces during the Cold War from 1959 to 1996. She was the third ship in her class and the second vessel to carry the designation HMCS Gatineau. She was sold for scrapping in 2009.

== Design and description ==
Based on the preceding St. Laurent-class design, the Restigouches had the same hull and propulsion, but different weaponry. Initially the St. Laurent class had been planned to be 14 ships. However the order was halved, and the following seven were redesigned to take into improvements made on the St. Laurents. As time passed, their design diverged further from that of the St. Laurents.

The ships had a displacement of 2,000 tonnes (2,000 long tons), 2,500 t (2,500 long tons) at deep load. They were designed to be 112 metres (366 ft) long with a beam of 13 metres (42 ft) and a draught of 4.01 metres (13 ft 2 in). The Restigouches had a complement of 214.

The Restigouches were by powered by two English Electric geared steam turbines, each driving a propeller shaft, using steam provided by two Babcock & Wilcox boilers. They generated 22,000 kilowatts (30,000 shp) giving the vessels a maximum speed of 28 knots (52 km/h; 32 mph).

The Restigouches were equipped with SPS-10, SPS-12, Sperry Mk 2 and SPG-48 radar along with SQS-501 and SQS-503 sonar.

=== Armament ===
The Restigouches diverged from the St. Laurents in their weaponry. The Restigouches were equipped with two twin mounts of Vickers 3-inch (76 mm)/70 calibre Mk 6 dual-purpose guns forward and maintained a single twin mount of 3-inch/50 calibre Mk 22 guns aft used in the preceding class. (Note: Calibre denotes the length of the barrel. In this case, 50 calibre means that the gun barrel is 50 times as long as it is in diameter) A Mk 69 fire control director was added to control the new guns. They were also armed with two Limbo Mk 10 mortars and two single Bofors 40 mm guns. However the 40 mm guns were dropped in the final design.

The destroyers were also equipped beginning in 1958 with Mk 43 homing torpedoes in an effort to increase the distance between the ships and their targets. The Mk 43 torpedo had a range of 4,100 metres (4,500 yd) at 15 knots (28 km/h; 17 mph). They were pitched over the side by a modified depth charge thrower.

=== Improved Restigouche Escorts (IRE) ===
As part of the 1964 naval program, the Royal Canadian Navy planned to improve the attack capabilities of the Restigouche class. Unable to convert the vessels to helicopter-carrying versions like the St. Laurents due to budget constraints, instead the Restigouches were to receive variable depth sonar (VDS) to improve their sonar range, placed on the stern, and the RUR-5 anti-submarine rocket (ASROC). The destroyers also received a stepped lattice mast. Called the Improved Restigouche Escorts (IRE), Terra Nova was the first to undergo conversion, beginning in May 1965. The conversion took ten months to complete, followed by sea trials. The sea trials delayed the conversion of the next ship for four years. By 1969, the budget for naval programs had been cut and only four out of the seven (Terra Nova, Restigouche, Gatineau and Kootenay) would get upgraded to IRE standards and the remaining three (Chaudiere, Columbia, and St. Croix) were placed in reserve.

The ASROC launcher replaced the 3 in/50 cal twin mount and one Mk 10 Limbo mortars aft. The ASROC was rocket-propelled Mk 44 torpedo that had a minimum range of 820 metres (900 yd) and a maximum range of 9,100 metres (10,000 yd). The Mk 44 torpedo had a weight of 193 kilograms (425 lb), was 2.5 metres (100 in) long and carried a 34-kilogram (75 lb) warhead. The torpedo itself had a maximum range of 5,500 metres (6,000 yd) at 30 knots (56 km/h; 35 mph). The torpedo was acoustically guided.

=== Destroyer Life Extension (DELEX) ===
The Destroyer Life Extension (DELEX) refit for the four surviving Restigouches was announced in 1978. An effort by Maritime Command to update their existing stock of naval escorts, the DELEX program affected 16 ships in total and came in several different formats depending on the class of ship it was being applied to. On average, the DELEX refit cost $24 million per ship. For the Restigouches this meant updating their sensor, weapon and communications systems. The class received the new ADLIPS tactical data system, new radar and fire control systems and satellite navigation. They were also fitted with a triple torpedo tube mounting to use the new Mk 46 torpedo. The ships began undergoing their DELEX refits in the early 1980s. However, by the time the ships emerged from their refits, they were already obsolete as the Falklands War had changed the way surface battles were fought.

== Construction and career ==
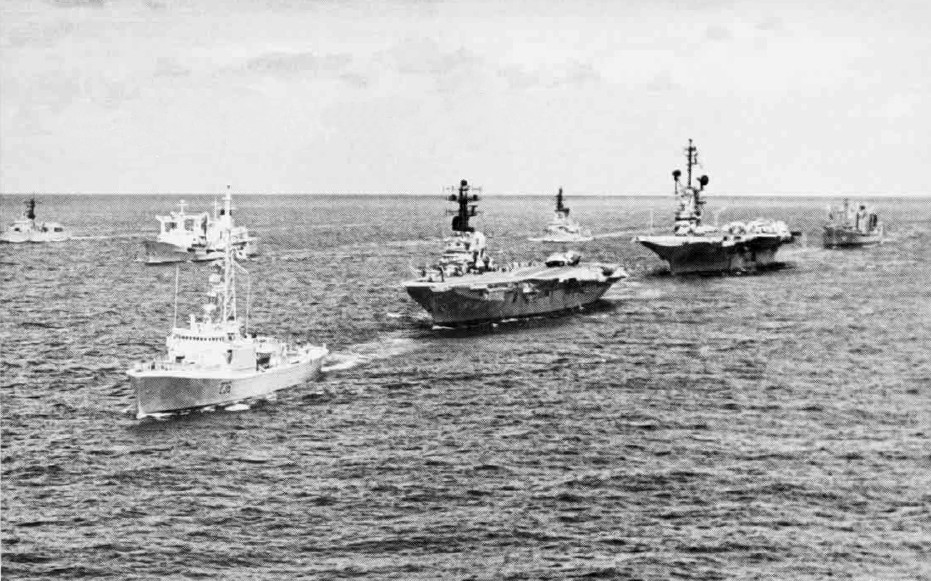
Gatineau taking part in the naval exercise RIMPAC '72

Gatineau, named for a river in Quebec, was laid down on 30 May 1953 by Davie Shipbuilding and Repairing Co. Ltd. at Lauzon, Quebec. The ship was launched on 3 June 1957. The ship was towed to Halifax, Nova Scotia by the tugboat Foundation Vigilant and completed there to avoid the freeze-up of the Saint Lawrence River. Gatineau was commissioned on 17 February 1959 at Halifax with the classification DDE 236. Following workups she joined the Fifth Canadian Escort Squadron.

In August 1960, the destroyer escort, along with sister ships Terra Nova, St. Croix and Kootenay, took part in the 500th anniversary of Prince Henry the Navigator's death off Lisbon.

In March 1965, Terra Nova and Gatineau participated in the search for a Royal Canadian Air Force Canadair CP-107 Argus that had disappeared 60 miles (97 km) north of San Juan, Puerto Rico. In 1966, Canada sent Gatineau and St. Laurent to the independence celebrations of the Bahamas, the only nation to send warships.

In March 1968, Gatineau joined the NATO Standing Naval Force Atlantic (STANAVFORLANT), the first Canadian warship to do so. She served for nine months in the role before returning to Canada. In 1969, Gatineau was transferred to the west coast as part of the re-ordering of naval forces following the Unification of the Canadian Armed Forces in 1968, where four Restigouche-class vessels were transferred to the west coast, to replace the Mackenzie-class destroyers in the Second Canadian Escort Squadron. On 9 September 1969, Gatineau began her IRE conversion which took until 14 April 1971 to complete.

Upon rejoining the fleet, the ship was assigned to the Second Canadian Destroyer Squadron. On 28 August 1972, Gatineau, Qu'Appelle and Provider deployed to the South Pacific. During the four-month cruise, the ships made several port calls and took part in three major naval exercises.

Gatineau underwent her DELEX refit between September 1981 and 12 November 1982. In 1987, Gatineau transferred to the east coast in exchange for the destroyer Huron as part of the reorganization of the fleet. In July 1988, the ship was assigned to STANAVFORLANT for five months.

In September 1992, STANAVFORLANT took over the responsibility for patrolling the Adriatic Sea as part of the NATO intervention in Bosnia and Herzegovina. Gatineau had six .50 calibre machine guns, search lights, night vision equipment and a rigid-hulled inflatable boat installed aboard before departing for deployment with STANAVFORLANT as Canada's contribution.

In July 1993, Gatineau escorted three Soviet warships that visited Canada, among them the cruiser Marshal Ustinov. Later that year, Gatineau was deployed off Haiti as part of the force enforcing the United Nations-sanctioned blockade of the island returning to Halifax on 23 November. In 1995, the ship took part in the NATO naval exercise Strong Resolve off the coast of Norway, acting as the Canadian flagship. In April 1995, Gatineau was at sea in support of the Department of Fisheries and Oceans and the Canadian Coast Guard who were enforcing the Canadian exclusive economic zone in a fishing dispute with Spain called the Turbot War.

The ship was paid off on 1 July 1998. Gatineau was sold in October 2009, along with Terra Nova, for $4,258,529 to Aecon Fabco for scrapping. The ships were towed to Pictou, Nova Scotia in mid-November 2009 for breaking up.
