= HMCS Restigouche =

Several Canadian naval units have been named HMCS Restigouche.

- HMCS Restigouche (H00) (I) was a River-class destroyer originally commissioned as HMS Comet (H00) until transfer to the Royal Canadian Navy in 1938.
- HMCS Restigouche (DDE 257) (II) was the lead ship of the Restigouche-class destroyer that served in the RCN and Canadian Forces.

== Battle honours ==
- Atlantic 1939–45
- North Sea 1940
- Mediterranean 1943
- Normandy 1944
- Biscay 1944
