= HMCS Columbia (DDE 260) =

Restigouche-class destroyer of the Royal Canadian Navy

Coordinates: 50°8′N 125°20′W

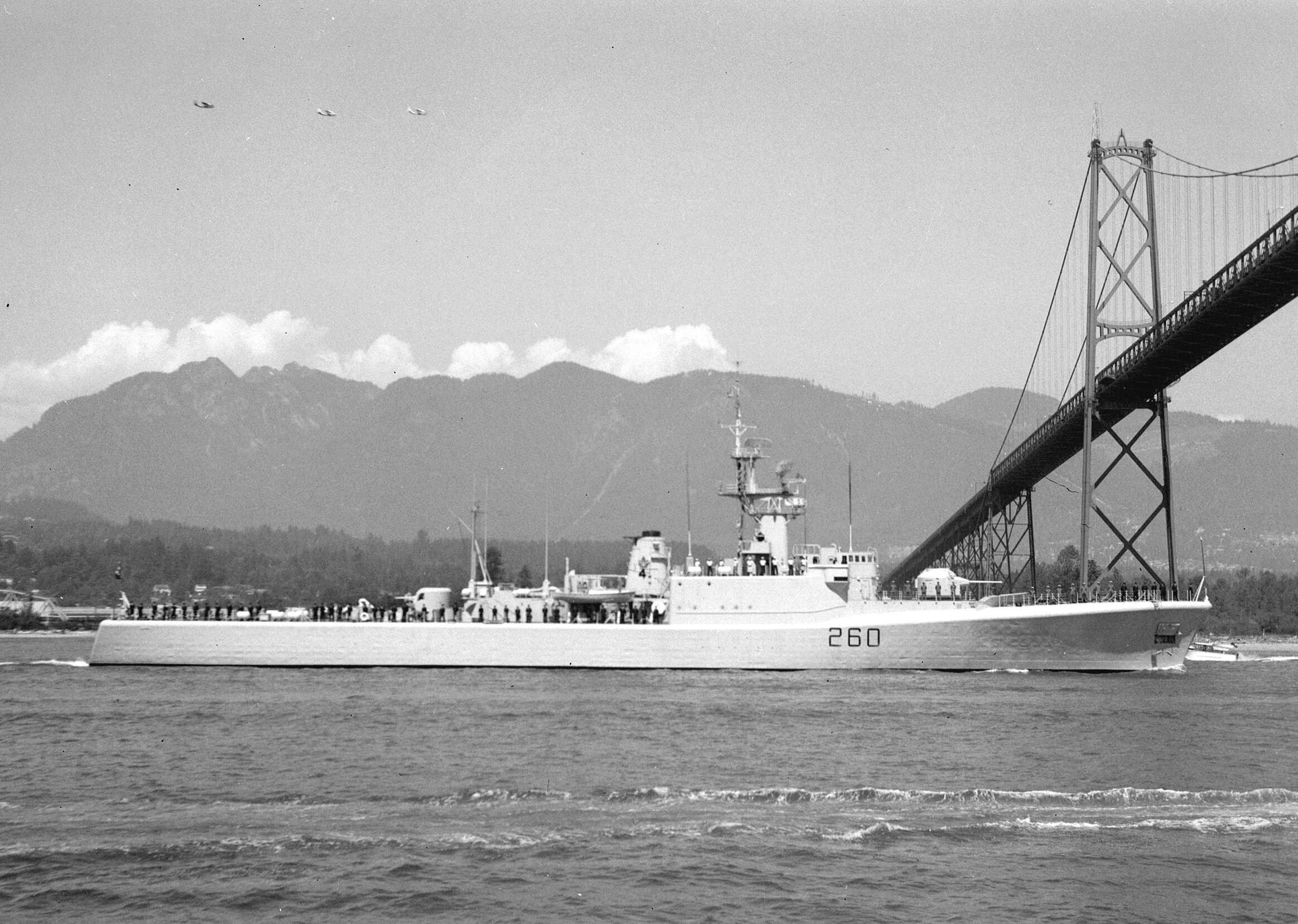
- HMCS Columbia in Vancouver, c. 1970

History

Canada
- Name: Columbia
- Namesake: Columbia River
- Builder: Burrard Dry Dock, North Vancouver
- Laid down: 11 June 1952
- Launched: 1 November 1956
- Commissioned: 7 November 1959
- Decommissioned: 18 February 1974
- Home port: CFB Esquimalt
- Identification: DDE 260
- Motto: Floreat Columbia ubique ("May Columbia flourish everywhere")
- Honours and awards: Belgian Coast, 1914–15, Atlantic 1940–44
- Fate: Sunk as artificial reef off British Columbia in June 1996.
- Badge: Gules, a bend wavy argent charged with two like cotises azure, and over all in the center a dogwood flower proper

General characteristics
- Class & type: Restigouche-class destroyer
- Displacement: 2,800 t (2,800 long tons; 3,100 short tons) (deep load)
- Length: 366 ft (111.6 m)
- Beam: 42 ft (12.8 m)
- Draught: 14 ft (4.3 m)
- Propulsion: 2-shaft English-Electric geared steam turbines; 2 x Babcock & Wilcox boilers; 30,000 shp (22,000 kW)
- Speed: 28 knots (52 km/h; 32 mph)
- Range: 4,750 nautical miles (8,800 km; 5,470 mi) at 14 knots (26 km/h; 16 mph)
- Complement: 214
- Sensors & processing systems: 1 × SPS-12 air search radar; 1 × SPS-10B surface search radar; 1 × Sperry Mk.2 navigation radar; 1 × SQS-501 high frequency bottom profiler sonar; 1 × SQS-502 high frequency mortar control sonar; 1 × SQS-503 hull mounted active search sonar; 1 × SQS-10 hull mounted active search sonar; 1 × Mk.69 gunnery control system with SPG-48 director forward; 1 × GUNAR Mk.64 GFCS with on-mount SPG-48 director aft
- Electronic warfare & decoys: 1 × DAU HF/DF (high frequency direction finder)
- Armament: 1 × 3-inch/70 Mk.6 Vickers twin mount forward; 1 × 3-inch/50 Mk.33 FMC twin mount aft; 2 × Mk NC 10 Limbo ASW mortars; 2 × single Mk.2 "K-gun" launchers with homing torpedoes; 1 × 103 mm Bofors illumination rocket launchers

HMCS Columbia was a Restigouche-class destroyer that served in the Royal Canadian Navy and later the Canadian Forces from 1959 to 1974. Columbia was the seventh and final ship in her class and is the second Canadian naval unit to carry the name HMCS Columbia. Following her service, she was kept at Esquimalt in an altered condition, no longer capable of sailing. During the summer of 1974 she along with her sister ship HMCS Chaudiere served as the base of operations for the Esquimalt Sea Cadet Camp while being docked at the DND jetty in Colwood. This location was across the harbour from the main site of CFB Esquimalt. Columbia was sold for use as an artificial reef and sunk off the coast of British Columbia in 1996.

== Design and description ==
Based on the preceding St. Laurent-class design, the Restigouches had the same hull and propulsion, but different weaponry. Initially the St. Laurent class had been planned to be 14 ships. However the order was halved, and the following seven were redesigned to take into improvements made on the St. Laurents. As time passed, their design diverged further from that of the St. Laurents.

The ships had a displacement of 2,000 tonnes (2,000 long tons), 2,500 t (2,500 long tons) at deep load. They were designed to be 112 metres (366 ft) long with a beam of 13 metres (42 ft) and a draught of 4.01 metres (13 ft 2 in). The Restigouches had a complement of 214.

The Restigouches were by powered by two English Electric geared steam turbines, each driving a propeller shaft, using steam provided by two Babcock & Wilcox boilers. They generated 22,000 kilowatts (30,000 shp) giving the vessels a maximum speed of 28 knots (52 km/h; 32 mph).

The Restigouches were equipped with SPS-10, SPS-12, Sperry Mk 2 and SPG-48 radar along with SQS-501 and SQS-503 sonar.

=== Armament ===
The Restigouches diverged from the St. Laurents in their weaponry. The Restigouches were equipped with two twin mounts of Vickers 3-inch (76 mm)/70 calibre Mk 6 dual-purpose guns forward and maintained a single twin mount of 3-inch/50 calibre Mk 22 guns aft used in the preceding class. (Note: Calibre denotes the length of the barrel. In this case, 50 calibre means that the gun barrel is 50 times as long as its bore diameter) A Mk 69 fire control director was added to control the new guns. They were also armed with two Limbo Mk 10 mortars and two single Bofors 40 mm guns. However the 40 mm guns were dropped in the final design.

From 1958 the destroyers were also equipped with Mk 43 homing torpedoes in an effort to increase the effective range of the armament. The Mk 43 torpedo had a range of 4,100 metres (4,500 yd) at 15 knots (28 km/h; 17 mph). They were launched by a modified depth charge thrower.

== Service history ==
Columbia was laid down on 11 June 1953 at Burrard Dry Dock in North Vancouver, British Columbia. Named for the Columbia River that flows from British Columbia into the United States, Columbia was launched on 1 November 1956. She was commissioned into the Royal Canadian Navy on 7 November 1959 with the classification DDE 260.

Columbia transferred to the east coast and in 1960 and was assigned to the Fifth Canadian Escort Squadron. In August, the ship recovered two crew members of a Tracker aircraft that had crashed at sea 180 nautical miles (330 km; 210 mi) south of Halifax, Nova Scotia. The aircraft had been training with Columbia and sister ship Chaudière. She was present for Nigeria's Independence ceremonies at Lagos on 1 November. In March 1961, the destroyer escort was among the ships that took part in a combined naval exercise with the United States Navy off Nova Scotia.

During the reorganization of the fleet following the unification of the Canadian Armed Forces and the creation of Maritime Command, Columbia was transferred back to the Pacific as part of the Second Canadian Escort Squadron. The ship sailed for Esquimalt in March 1967 with two other vessels being transferred; Crescent and Algonquin.

Columbia was paid off on 18 February 1974. Placed in reserve, the ship was fitted so that she could run her engines at dockside for use as a training ship. The ship was sold to the Artificial Reef Society of British Columbia and sunk as an artificial reef near Campbell River, British Columbia in June 1996.
