= Kootenay =

Kootenay, Kootenai, and Kutenai may refer to:

== Ethnic groups ==
- The Kutenai, also known as the Ktunaxa, Kootenai, or Kootenay, an indigenous people of the United States and Canada
  - Kutenai language, the traditional language of the Kutenai
  - Ktunaxa Nation, a First Nations government in British Columbia, Canada
  - Kootenai Tribe of Idaho, a federally recognized tribe in Idaho, United States,
  - Confederated Salish and Kootenai Tribes, a federally recognized tribe in Montana, United States

== Places ==
=== Communities ===
- Kootenai, Idaho, United States
- Kootenay, British Columbia, Canada
- Kootenay Bay, an unincorporated community in British Columbia, Canada
- Kootenai County, Idaho, United States
- Diocese of Kootenay, a diocese of the Ecclesiastical Province of British Columbia and the Yukon of the Anglican Church of Canada
- List of electoral districts in the Kootenays, electoral districts in the Kootenays region of British Columbia
  - Kootenay (federal electoral district), a former electoral district in British Columbia, Canada
- Regional District of East Kootenay, British Columbia

=== Geographical features ===
- Kootenai National Forest, a national forest in Montana and Idaho, United States
- The Kootenays, a region of southeastern British Columbia, Canada
- Kootenay Canal, a hydroelectric power station in British Columbia, Canada
- Kootenay Group, a geologic formation in British Columbia, Canada
- Kootenay Lake, on the Kootenay River in British Columbia, Canada
- Kootenay National Park, a national park in British Columbia at the source of the Kootenay River
- Kootenay Pass, a mountain pass in the Selkirk Mountains of British Columbia, Canada
- Kootenay Ranges, part of the Canadian Rockies
- Kootenay River, or Kutenai River in the United States, a river that runs through British Columbia, Idaho, and Montana

== Transportation ==
- Kootenay Direct Airlines, a former airline based in Nelson, British Columbia, Canada
- Kootenay Highway, part of British Columbia Highway 93
- Kootenay Loop, a public transit exchange in Vancouver, British Columbia, Canada
- HMCS Kootenay, Royal Canadian Navy ships of the name
- SS Kootenay, a steamboat that served the Arrow Lakes in British Columbia, Canada

== Other uses ==
- Kootenay Brown (1839–1916), Irish-born Canadian polymath, soldier, trader and conservation advocate
- Kootanae House, a historical North West Company fur trade post near present-day Invermere, British Columbia
- The Kootenay Ice, a junior ice hockey team based in Cranbrook, British Columbia, Canada
