= HMCS St. Laurent (DDH 205) =

Former destroyer of the Royal Canadian Navy

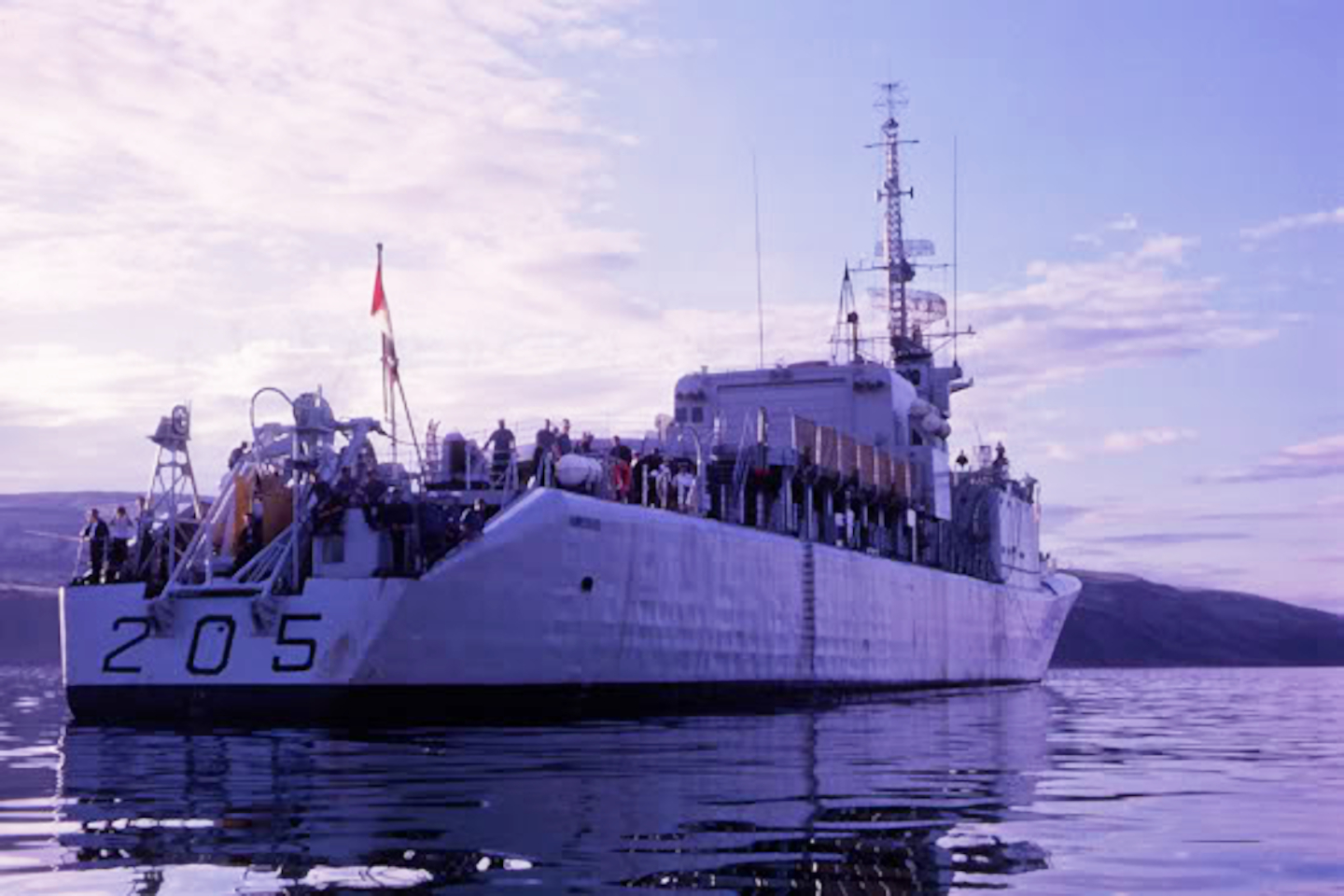
- HMCS St. Laurent (as DDH) in the Irish Sea, 1966

History

Canada
- Name: St. Laurent
- Namesake: St. Lawrence River
- Builder: Canadian Vickers, Montreal
- Cost: $ 15,000,000 (Note: Adjusted for inflation to 2026 dollars, $197,040,000.)
- Laid down: 24 November 1950
- Launched: 30 November 1951
- Commissioned: 29 October 1955
- Decommissioned: 14 June 1974
- Reclassified: 4 October 1963 (as DDH)
- Identification: Pennant number: 205
- Motto: "Ever on guard"
- Honours and awards: Atlantic 1939–45, Normandy 1944
- Fate: Sunk off Cape Hatteras en route to breakers in Texas, 1980.
- Badge: Bendy wavy of eight or and azure, a white whale embowed head to dexter base, tail to center chief proper, and charged on the shoulder with a grid gules.

General characteristics
- Type: St. Laurent-class destroyer escort
- Displacement: As DDE: 2263 tons (normal), 2800 tons (deep load); As DDH: 2260 tons (normal), 3051 tons (deep load)
- Length: 366 ft (111.6 m)
- Beam: 42 ft (12.8 m)
- Draught: As DDE: 13 ft (4.0 m); As DDH:14 ft (4.3 m)
- Propulsion: 2-shaft English-Electric geared steam turbines, 3 Babcock & Wilcox boilers 22,000 kW (30,000 shp)
- Speed: 28.5 knots (52.8 km/h)
- Range: 4,570 nautical miles (8,463.6 km) at 12 knots (22.2 km/h)
- Complement: As DDE: 249; As DDH: 213 plus 20 aircrew
- Sensors & processing systems: As DDE: 1 × SPS-12 air search radar; 1 × SPS-10B surface search radar; 1 × Sperry Mk.2 navigation radar; 1 × SQS-10 or −11 hull mounted active search and attack sonar; 1 × SQS-501 (Type 162) high frequency bottom profiling sonar; 1 × SQS-502 (Type 170) high frequency Limbo mortar control sonar; 1 × UQC-1B "Gertrude" underwater telephone; 1 × GUNAR (Mk.64 GFCS with 2 on-mount SPG-48 directors); As DDH: 1 × SPS-12 air search radar; 1 × SPS-10B surface search radar; 1 × Sperry Mk.2 navigation radar; 1 × URN 20 TACAN radar; 1 × SQS-10 or −11 hull mounted active search and attack sonar; 1 × SQS-501 (Type 162) high frequency bottom profiling sonar; 1 × SQS-502 (Type 170) high frequency Limbo mortar control sonar; 1 × SQS-504 VDS, medium frequency active search (except 233 after 1986); 1 × UQC-1B "Gertrude" underwater telephone; 1 × GUNAR (Mk.64 GFCS with 1 on-mount SPG-48 director)
- Electronic warfare & decoys: As DDE: 1 × DAU HF/DF (high frequency direction finder); As DDH: 1 × WLR 1C radar warning; 1 × UPD 501 radar detection; 1 × SRD 501 HF/DF
- Armament: As DDE: 2 × 3 in (76 mm) Mk.33 FMC twin mounts guns; 2 × 40 mm "Boffin" single mount guns; 2 × Mk NC 10 Limbo ASW mortars; 2 × single Mk.2 "K-gun" launchers with homing torpedoes; As DDH: 1 × 3"/50 Mk.33 FMC twin mount gun; 1 × Mk NC 10 Limbo ASW mortar; 2 × triple Mk.32 12.75 inch launchers firing Mk.44 or Mk.46 Mod 5 torpedoes
- Aircraft carried: As DDH: 1 × CH-124 Sea King
- Aviation facilities: As DDH: 1 × midships helicopter deck with Beartrap and hangar

HMCS St. Laurent was a St. Laurent-class destroyer that served in the Royal Canadian Navy and later the Canadian Forces from 1955–1974. She was the lead ship of her class, the first modern warship designed and built in Canada.

St. Laurent was laid down on 24 November 1950 by Canadian Vickers at Montreal. She was launched on 30 November the following year and was commissioned into the Royal Canadian Navy on 29 October 1955 and initially carried the pennant number DDE 205 as a destroyer escort. Prime Minister Louis St. Laurent was present at her commissioning. She was reported to have cost $15,000,000 to build. She underwent conversion to a destroyer helicopter escort (DDH) in the early 1960s and was officially re-classed with pennant DDH 205 on 4 October 1963.

== Design and description ==
Elizabeth II, the former Queen of Canada, pictured with the crew of HMCS St. Laurent in Stockholm, Sweden, June 11, 1956.

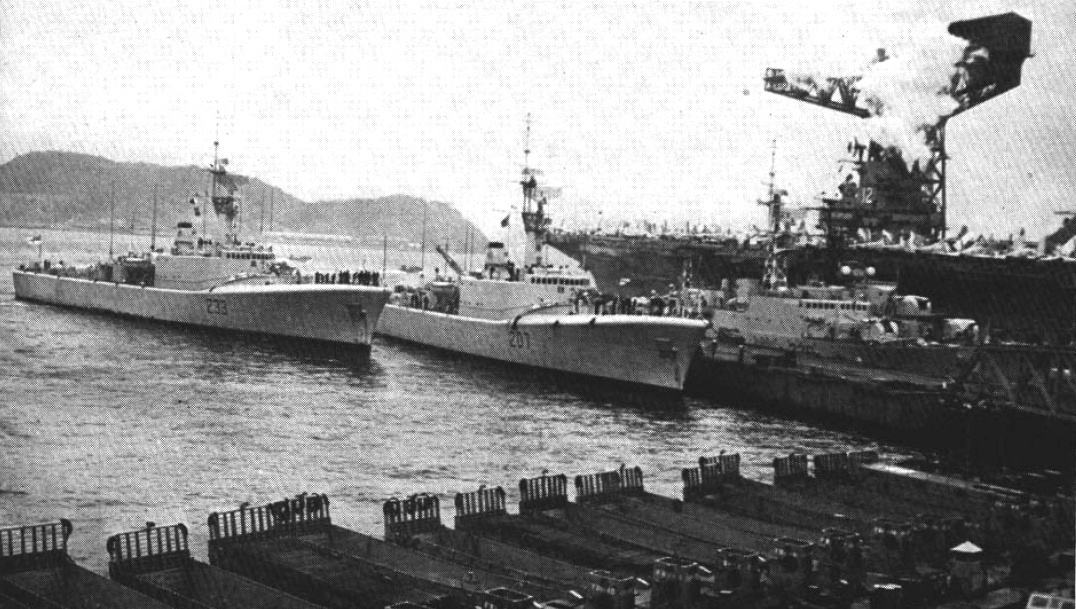
Two St. Laurent-class destroyers in their original DDE configuration

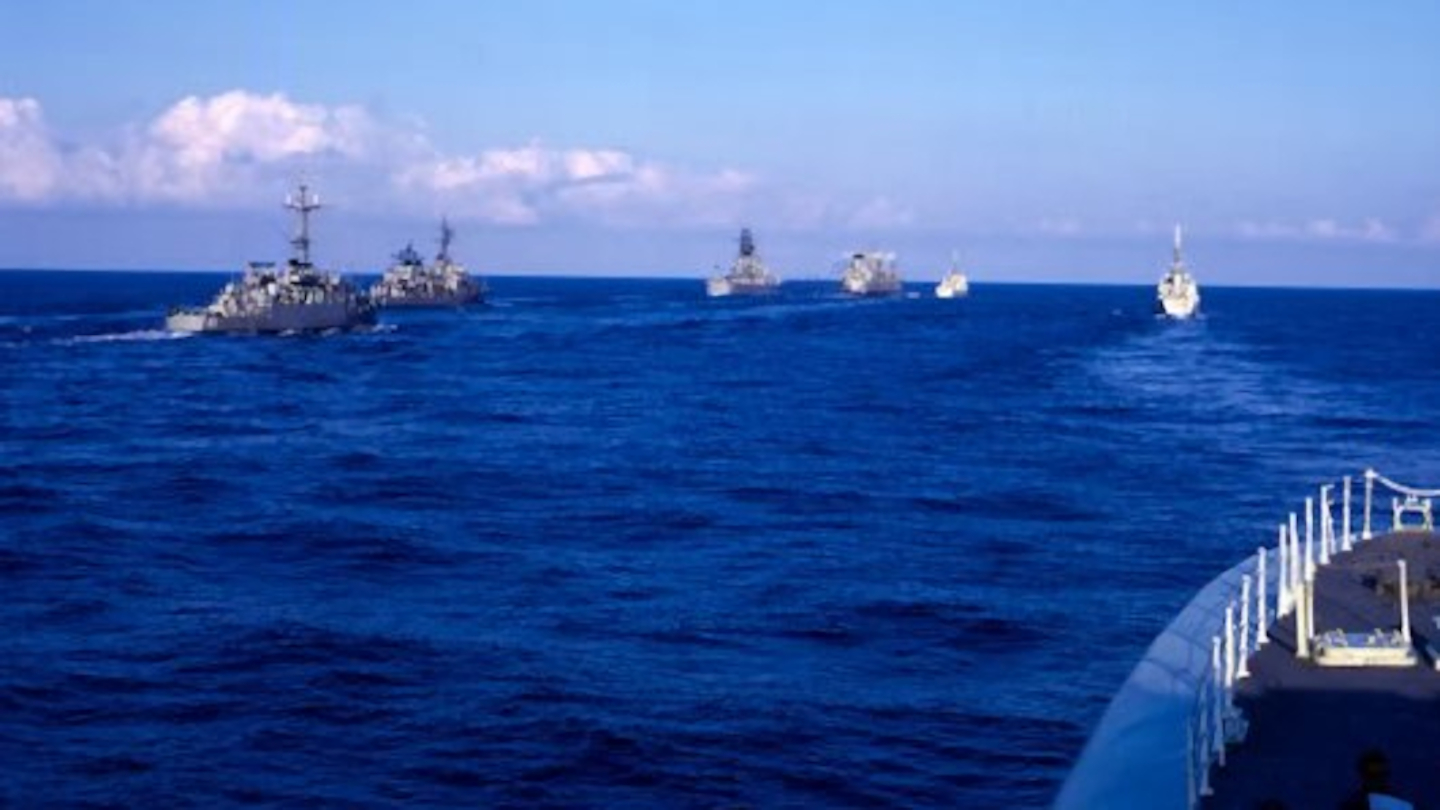
HMCS St. Laurent third in line to refuel, showing a St. Laurent's unique round-down: see photo's description

The need for the St. Laurent class came about in 1949 when Canada joined NATO and the Cold War was in its infancy. The Royal Canadian Navy (RCN) was assigned responsibility for anti-submarine warfare (ASW) and controlling sea space in the western North Atlantic. The St Laurent class were built to an operational requirement much like that which produced the British Type 12, and were powered by the same machinery plant. The rounded deck-edge forward was adopted to prevent ice forming. The vessels were designed to operate in harsh Canadian conditions. They were built to counter nuclear, biological and chemical attack conditions, which led to a design with a rounded hull, a continuous main deck, and the addition of a pre-wetting system to wash away contaminants. The living spaces on the ship were part of a "citadel" which could be sealed off from contamination for the crew safety. The ships were sometimes referred to as "Cadillacs" for their relatively luxurious crew compartments; these were also the first Canadian warships to have a bunk for every crew member since previous warship designs had used hammocks.

As built, the ships were 366 feet (112 m) long overall with a beam of 42 feet (13 m) and a draught of 13 feet 2 inches (4.01 m). The destroyer escorts displaced 2,263 tonnes (2,227 long tons) standard and 2,800 tonnes (2,800 long tons) at deep load. (Note: Conway's says 2000 tons standard displacement, 2600 deep load.) The destroyer escorts had a crew of 12 officers and 237 enlisted.

=== Armament ===
The St. Laurent class was fitted with twin 3-inch (76 mm)/L50 caliber guns in two mounts for engaging both surface and air targets. The ships were also fitted with two single-mounted 40 mm (1.6 in) guns. The class's anti-submarine armament consisted of a pair of triple-barreled Mk. NC 10 Limbo ASW mortars in a stern well. The stern well had a roller top to close it off from following seas. As with the British Type 12 design, the provision for long-range homing torpedoes (in this case BIDDER [Mk 20E] or the US Mark 35 were included. However, they were never fitted.

=== Machinery ===
The vessels of the St. Laurent class had two Babcock & Wilcox water tube boilers installed. The steam produced by these boilers was directed at two geared steam turbines which powered two shafts, providing 22,000 kilowatts (30,000 shp) to drive the ship at a maximum speed of 28.5 knots (52.8 km/h). The ships had an endurance of 4,570 nautical miles (8,460 km) at 12 knots (22 km/h).

=== DDH conversion ===
Following successful trials aboard the frigate Buckingham and sister ship Ottawa, plans to convert the St. Laurent class took shape. Th development of the beartrap, installed in Assiniboine during her 1962–63 conversion, finalized the concept. By keeping the aircraft secure, the beartrap eliminated the need for deck handling from landing to the hangar, or from hangar to takeoff.

In the conversion to a helicopter-carrying vessel, St. Laurent was gutted except for machinery and some forward spaces. The hull was strengthened, and fuelling facilities for the helicopter and active fin stabilizers were installed. The fin stabilizers were to reduce roll in rough weather during helicopter operations. All seven St Laurents were fitted with helicopter platforms and SQS 504 Variable Depth Sonar (VDS). The single funnel was altered to twin stepped funnels to permit the forward extension of the helicopter hangar. To make room for the helicopter deck, the aft 3-inch mount and one of the Limbos were removed. The two 40 mm guns were also removed. Following the conversion, the displacement remained the same at standard load but at full load, it increased to 3,051 tonnes (3,003 long tons).

== Operational history ==
After commissioning, St. Laurent was sent to the United States to work up and be evaluated and then proceeded to visit the United Kingdom. While there the ship was part of the escort for the royal yacht HMY Britannia on a state visit to Sweden. She was then stationed to the west coast where she performed various diplomatic duties. Prior to undergoing her conversion to a DDH, she was test fitted with the variable depth sonar (VDS).

In 1959 the Canadian government ordered that the St. Laurent class be modernized, even though the class was relatively new. This was based on the fact that the St. Laurent class was no longer capable of fighting the new nuclear submarines entering service. This was done to extend the detection range of the ships and to eliminate any speed advantage of the nuclear submarines. St. Laurent was a member of the Second Canadian Escort Squadron in 1960 based out of Esquimalt, British Columbia. In February 1960, St. Laurent, with two sister ships, departed Esquimalt, British Columbia performed a training cruise around the Pacific making several port visits and returning in April. In March 1961, St. Laurent, Ottawa and Saguenay deployed with the United States Navy's Carrier Division 17 off Hawaii.

Prior to undergoing her DDH conversion, a Variable Depth Sonar (VDS) system was test fitted to the ship, which required the alteration of the stern. The ship then underwent the DDH refit in 1962, emerging on 4 October 1963. This meant extensively rebuilding the superstructure. A hangar and flight deck were added and to make room for these the original single stack was twinned. The flight deck addition required the removal of one gun and one Limbo mount. The ship was then assigned to the east coast. In 1964, with Mackenzie and Fraser, St. Laurent sailed on a training cruise to the Pacific.

In 1966, Canada sent St. Laurent and Gatineau to the Bahamas to participate in their independence celebrations, the only country to send warships. In 1969, the ship tracked a Cuban-bound Soviet task force that was transiting through Canadian waters.

St. Laurent experienced keel damage later in her career and was paid off early as the Canadian Forces opted to not include her in the Destroyer Life Extension (DELEX) program of the 1970s. She was decommissioned from the Canadian Forces on 14 June 1974 and sat in Halifax as a source for spare parts for her sisters. Her early decommissioning is attributed to cost-cutting in the Canadian Forces at the time.

The ship was sold on 27 September 1979 to Dartmouth Salvage Co. for scrapping. St. Laurent was resold and while en route to breakers in Brownsville, Texas, she took on water in the tail end of a powerful storm and foundered off Cape Hatteras on 12 January 1980.
