= HMCS Terra Nova =

Destroyer of the Royal Canadian Navy

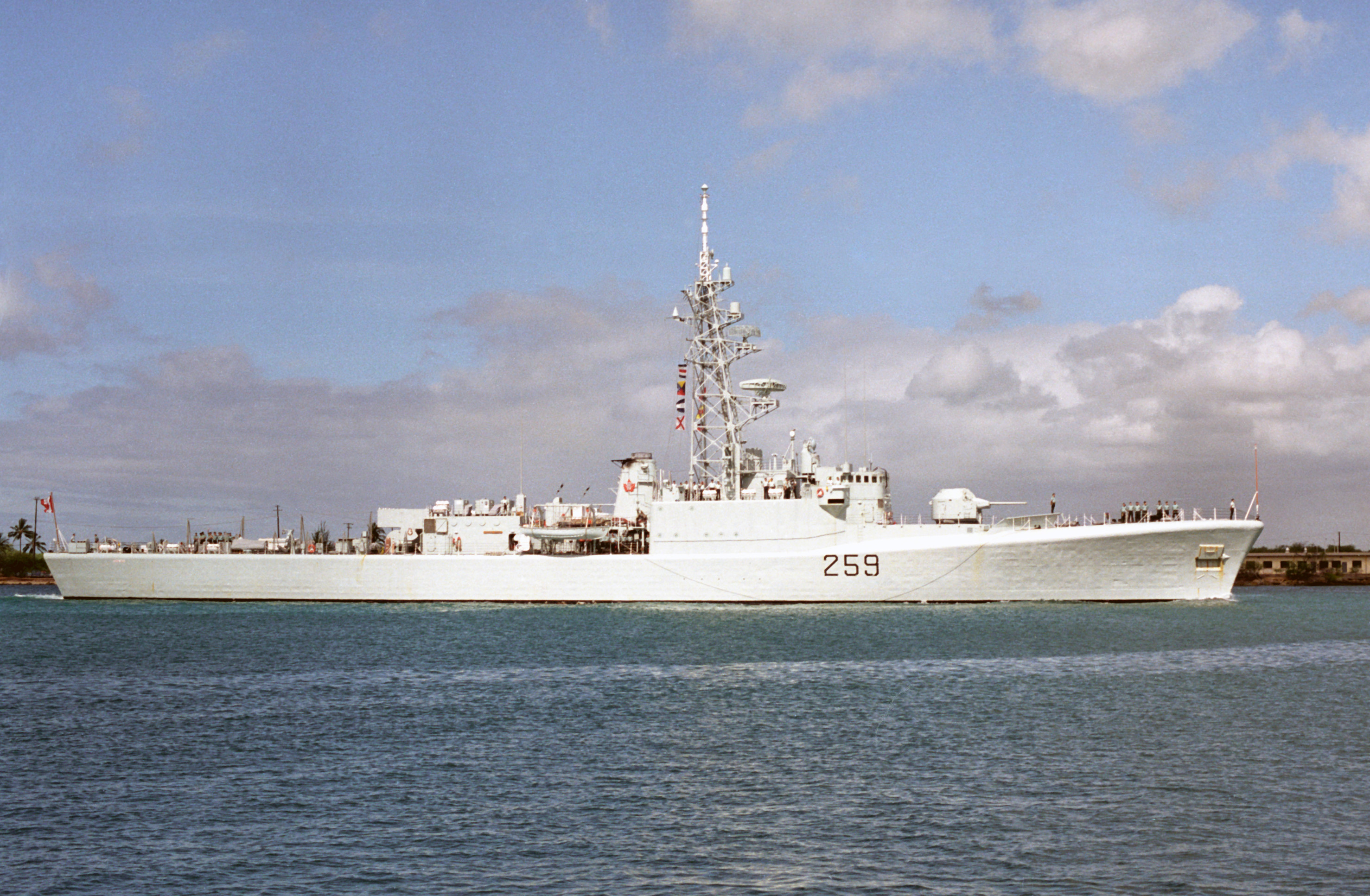
- HMCS Terra Nova at Pearl Harbor in 1986

History

Canada
- Name: Terra Nova
- Namesake: Terra Nova River
- Builder: Victoria Machinery Depot, Victoria
- Laid down: 11 June 1953
- Launched: 21 June 1955
- Commissioned: 6 June 1959
- Decommissioned: 11 July 1997
- Refit: 1968 (IRE); 9 November 1984 (DELEX); August–September 1990 (Persian Gulf)
- Home port: CFB Halifax
- Identification: Hull number: DDE 259
- Motto: Tenax propositi ("Do not falter")
- Honours and awards: Gulf and Kuwait, 1991
- Fate: Sold for scrap, October 2009
- Badge: Gules, a bend wavy argent charged with two like cotises azure, debruised with a cross of the second charged with a penguin erect proper

General characteristics (As built)
- Class & type: Restigouche-class destroyer
- Displacement: 2800 tonnes (deep load)
- Length: 366 ft (111.6 m)
- Beam: 42 ft (12.8 m)
- Draught: 14 ft (4.3 m)
- Propulsion: 2-shaft English-Electric geared steam turbines, 2 Babcock & Wilcox boilers 30,000 shp (22,000 kW)
- Speed: 28 knots (52 km/h; 32 mph)
- Range: 4,750 nautical miles (8,800 km; 5,470 mi) at 14 knots (26 km/h; 16 mph)
- Complement: As built: 249
- Sensors & processing systems: 1 × SPS-503 air search radar; 1 × SPS-502 surface search radar; 1 × Sperry Mk.2 navigation radar; 1 × SQS-501 high frequency bottom profiler sonar; 1 × SQS-502 high frequency mortar control sonar; 1 × SQS-503 hull mounted active search sonar; 1 × SQS-10 hull mounted active search sonar; 1 × Mk.69 gunnery control system with SPG-48 director forward; GUNAR Mk.64 GFCS with on-mount SPG-48 director aft
- Electronic warfare & decoys: 1 × DAU HF/DF (high frequency direction finder)
- Armament: 1 × 3-inch/70 Mk.6 Vickers twin mount forward; 1 × 3-inch/50 Mk.33 FMC twin mount aft; 2 × Mk NC 10 Limbo ASW mortars; 2 × single Mk.2 "K-gun" launchers with homing torpedoes; 1 × 103 mm Bofors illumination rocket launchers

HMCS Terra Nova (DDE 259) was a Restigouche-class destroyer that served in the Royal Canadian Navy and later the Canadian Forces from 1959 until 1997. After her final refit, she was a guided missile destroyer.

She was the sixth ship of her class and the first Canadian war ship to bear the name Terra Nova. The ship's badge honours the Terra Nova River on Newfoundland as well as an earlier civilian ship, Terra Nova, which gained fame during a scientific exploration voyage to Antarctica. They are represented as a river and the Antarctic (symbolized by a penguin) on the ship's badge.

== Design and description ==
Based on the preceding St. Laurent-class design, the Restigouche-class ships had the same hull and propulsion, but different weaponry. Initially the St. Laurent-class had been planned to be 14 ships. However the order was halved, and the following seven were redesigned to take into improvements made on the St. Laurent-class ships. As time passed, their design diverged further from that of the St. Laurent-class ships

The ships had a displacement of 2,000 tonnes (2,000 long tons), 2,500 t (2,500 long tons) at deep load. They were designed to be 112 metres (366 ft) long with a beam of 13 metres (42 ft) and a draught of 4.01 metres (13 ft 2 in). The Restigouches had a complement of 214.

The Restigouche-class ships were by powered by two English Electric geared steam turbines, each driving a propeller shaft, using steam provided by two Babcock & Wilcox boilers. They generated 22,000 kilowatts (30,000 shp) giving the vessels a maximum speed of 28 knots (52 km/h; 32 mph).

The Restigouche-class ships were equipped with SPS-10, SPS-12, Sperry Mk 2 and SPG-48 radar along with SQS-501 and SQS-503 sonar.

=== Armament ===
The Restigouche-class ships diverged from the St. Laurent-class ships in their weaponry. The Restigouche-class ships were equipped with a single twin mount of Vickers 3-inch (76 mm)/70 calibre Mk 6 dual-purpose guns forward and maintained a single twin mount of 3-inch/50 calibre Mk 22 guns aft used in the preceding class. (Note: Calibre denotes the length of the barrel. In this case, 50 calibre means that the gun barrel is 50 times as long as it is in diameter) A Mk 69 fire control director was added to control the new guns. They were also armed with two three barreled Limbo Mk 10 mortars and two single Bofors 40 mm guns. However the 40 mm guns were dropped in the final design. The 3 in/70 mounting was placed in the 'A' position and the 3 in/50 mounting was placed in the 'Y' position.

The destroyers were also equipped beginning in 1958 with Mk 43 homing torpedoes in an effort to increase the distance between the ships and their targets. The Mk 43 torpedo had a range of 4,100 metres (4,500 yd) at 15 knots (28 km/h; 17 mph). They were pitched over the side by a modified depth charge thrower.

=== Improved Restigouche Escorts (IRE) ===
As part of the 1964 naval program, the Royal Canadian Navy planned to improve the attack capabilities of the Restigouche-class. Unable to convert the vessels to helicopter-carrying versions like the St. Laurents due to budget constraints, instead Restigouche-class ships were to receive variable depth sonar (VDS) to improve their sonar range, placed on the stern, and the RUR-5 anti-submarine rocket (ASROC). The destroyers also received a stepped latticed mast. Called the Improved Restigouche Escorts (IRE), Terra Nova was the first to undergo conversion, beginning in May 1965. The conversion took ten months to complete, followed by sea trials. The sea trials delayed the conversion of the next ship for four years. By 1969, the budget for naval programs had been cut and only four out of the seven (Terra Nova, Restigouche, Gatineau and Kootenay) would get upgraded to IRE standards and the remaining three (Chaudière, Columbia, and St. Croix) were placed in reserve.

The ASROC launcher replaced the 3 in/50 cal twin mount and one Mk 10 Limbo mortars aft. The ASROC was rocket-propelled acoustically guided Mk 44 torpedo that had a minimum range of 820 metres (900 yd) and a maximum range of 9,100 metres (10,000 yd).

=== Destroyer Life Extension (DELEX) ===
The Destroyer Life Extension (DELEX) refit for the four surviving Restigouche-class ships was announced in 1978. An effort by Maritime Command to update their existing stock of naval escorts, the DELEX program affected 16 ships in total and came in several different formats depending on the class of ship it was being applied to. On average, the DELEX refit cost $24 million per ship. For the Restigouches this meant updating their sensor, weapon and communications systems. The class received the new ADLIPS tactical data system, new radar and fire control systems and satellite navigation. They were also fitted with a triple torpedo tube mounting to use the new Mk 46 torpedo. The ships began undergoing their DELEX refits in the early 1980s. However, by the time the ships emerged from their refits, they were already obsolete as the Falklands War had changed the way surface battles were fought.

=== Gulf War refit ===
With the advent of the Gulf War in August 1990, Maritime Command was asked to have a fleet of ships available to send to the Persian Gulf, preferably three ships. The Iroquois-class destroyer Athabaskan and the replenishment ship Protecteur would be made part of the task force; however, all the other Iroquois-class vessels were in refit. Maritime Command chose from among the remaining fleet the vessel with the best electronic countermeasures suite, Terra Nova, to deploy with the task force. Terra Nova was quickly altered to make her ready for an active war zone. The ship's ASROC system was landed and instead two quad Harpoon surface-to-surface missile systems were installed. A Mk 15 Phalanx close-in weapon system was placed on the quarterdeck in place of the landed Limbo ASW mortar, and two 40 mm/60 calibre Boffin guns were installed in single mounts where the ship's boats were. The ship was also fitted with new chaff, electronic and communications systems. Restigouche received a similar refit before deploying as Terra Nova's intended replacement in the Persian Gulf in 1991.

== Construction and career ==
Terra Nova, named for river in Newfoundland and Labrador, was laid down on 14 November 1952 by Victoria Machinery Depot Co. Ltd at Victoria, British Columbia. The ship was launched on 21 June 1955 and commissioned at Victoria on 6 June 1959 with the classification DDE 259.

Following her commissioning, Terra Nova joined the ceremonies for the opening of the Saint Lawrence Seaway in July 1959. The following year, in August, with sister ships St. Croix, Kootenay and Gatineau, she took part in the 500th anniversary of Prince Henry the Navigator's death off Lisbon. After work ups, the ship was assigned to the Fifth Canadian Escort Squadron. In March 1961, the destroyer escort was among the ships that took part in a combined naval exercise with the United States Navy off Nova Scotia.

In March 1965, Terra Nova and Gatineau participated in the search for a Royal Canadian Air Force Canadair CP-107 Argus that had disappeared 60 miles (97 km) north of San Juan, Puerto Rico. In May, the ship began her IRE refit. As the first to undergo the conversion, Terra Nova tested the new SQS-505 sonar for several months before the refit was considered completed. In all the conversion took ten months to complete. However Terra Nova's sea trials delayed the conversion program by four years. During this period, the ship first transferred from to the Third Canadian Escort Squadron in January 1966, before being transferred to the west coast as part of the re-ordering of naval forces following the Unification of the Canadian Armed Forces in 1968. She was one of four Restigouche-class vessels that were transferred to the west coast, to replace the Mackenzie-class destroyers in the Second Canadian Escort Squadron. The ship returned to duty on 4 May 1971 at Esquimalt, British Columbia. From 29 January to 26 June 1973, Kootenay and Terra Nova were deployed off the coast of Vietnam as part of the Canadian contribution to the International Commission of Control and Supervision following the end of the Vietnam War.

In November 1981, cracks were found in the superheater headers of Ottawa. Inspections were ordered for the Restigouche-class vessels, of which Terra Nova was found to have similar issues. The ship was repaired and back in service within six months. In May 1983, the ship made a four-day visit to China on behalf of the Department of External Affairs. Terra Nova was taken in hand on 21 November 1983 for her DELEX refit, performed at Esquimalt. She returned to service on 9 November 1984.

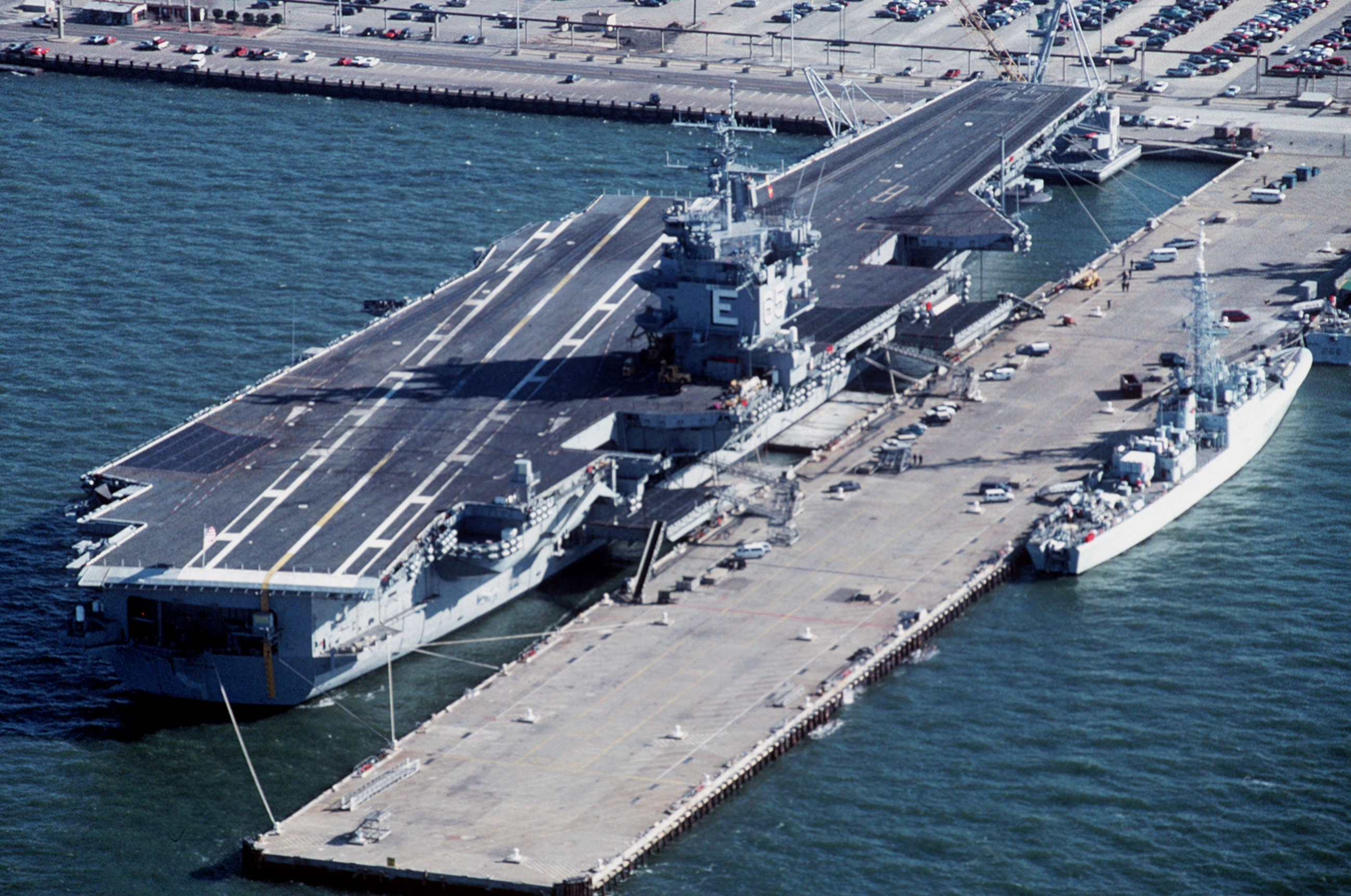
Terra Nova during a port visit to Norfolk, Virginia in 1995 alongside the US aircraft carrier Enterprise.

On 12 December 1989, Terra Nova transferred to the east coast in exchange for Annapolis as part of the reorganization of the fleet. Due to a shortage of Iroquois-class destroyers, Terra Nova was selected for deployment as part of Canada's contribution to Operation Desert Shield. She received a Gulf War refit before deploying and sailed for the Persian Gulf with the destroyer Athabaskan and the replenishment ship Preserver on 24 August 1990. They arrived in theatre on 27 September and Terra Nova performed her first patrol on 1 October. Terra Nova returned to Halifax on 7 April 1991. The Task Group was assigned to the international coalition maritime interdiction force in the central Persian Gulf which consisted of a variety of coalition naval forces on station through the fall of 1990. After Operation Desert Storm began in January, the Canadian Naval Task Group undertook escort duties for hospital ships and other coalition naval vessels.

In October 1992, Terra Nova began a refit at Port Weller Dry Dock in St. Catharines, Ontario, reentering service in 1993. On 22 February 1994, Terra Nova boarded the private vessel MV Pacifico, seizing 5.9 tonnes (5.8 long tons; 6.5 short tons) of cocaine. That same year, Terra Nova was part of the blockade enforcing United Nations resolutions on Haiti from 28 April to 18 July, rescuing two boatloads of refugees during this tour. She returned to blockade duty from 7 September to 19 October.

On 11 July 1997, the ship was taken out of active service and paid off on 1 July 1998. The ship was sold in October 2009, along with Gatineau for $4,258,529 to Aecon Fabco for scrapping. The ships were towed to Pictou, Nova Scotia in mid-November 2009 for breaking up. During the scrapping process, Terra Nova sank at her moorings. The hulk was later raised by crane.
