= HMCS Kootenay (DDE 258) =

Destroyer of the Royal Canadian Navy

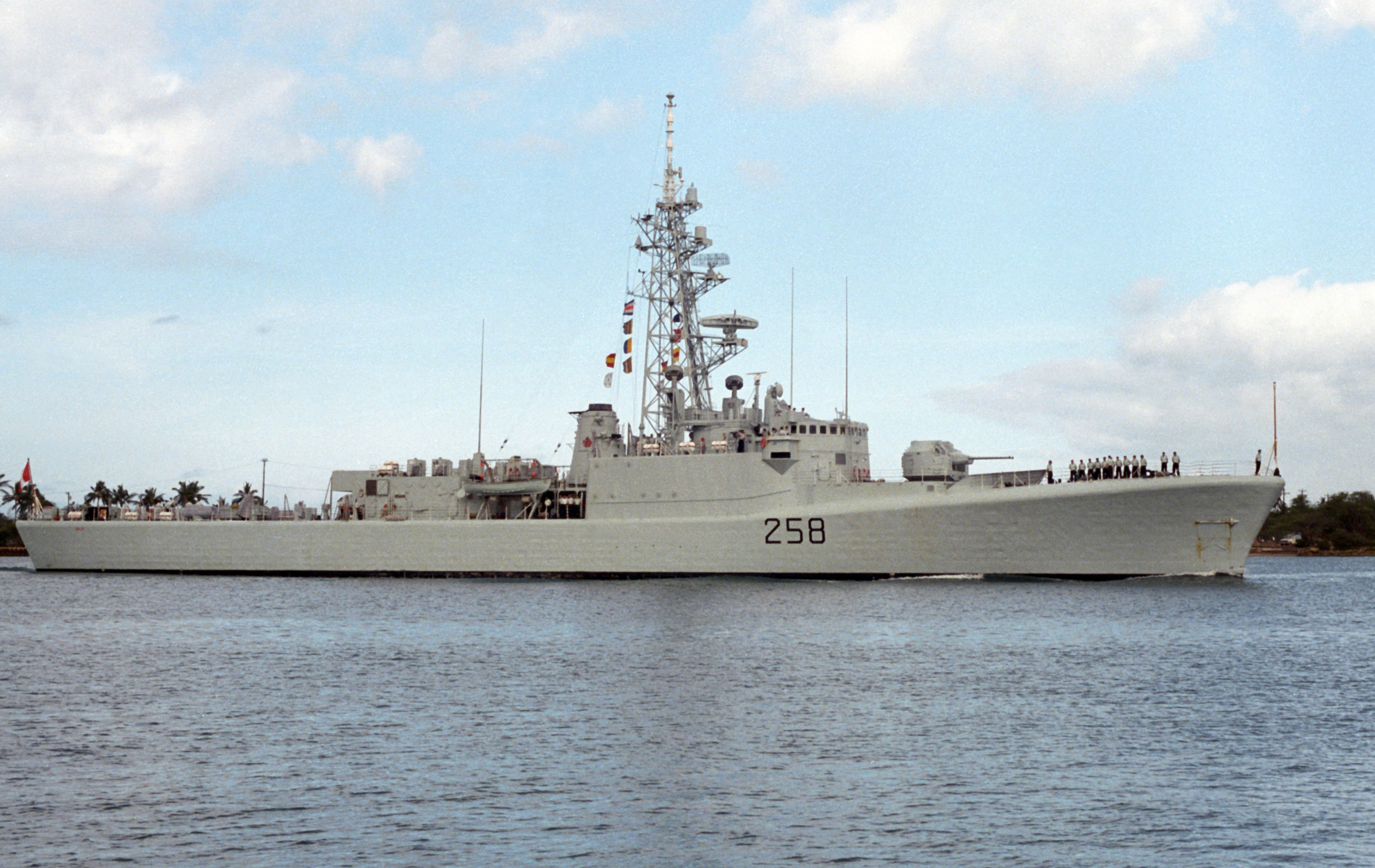
- HMCS Kootenay (DDE 258) in Pearl Harbor in 1986

History

Canada
- Name: Kootenay
- Namesake: Kootenay River
- Builder: Burrard Dry Dock, North Vancouver
- Laid down: 21 August 1952
- Launched: 15 June 1954
- Commissioned: 7 March 1959
- Decommissioned: 18 December 1995
- Refit: 7 January 1972 (IRE); 21 October 1983 (DELEX)
- Motto: We are as one
- Honours and awards: Atlantic 1943–1945; Normandy 1944; English Channel 1944; Biscay 1944
- Fate: Sunk as an artificial reef off Mexico in 2001.
- Badge: Argent, three cotises in bend wavy azure, over all a crescent sable debruised by an Indian fish spear-head gules, bound around the hilt with thongs argent

General characteristics (As built)
- Class & type: Restigouche-class destroyer
- Displacement: 2,000 tonnes (2,000 long tons) standard; 2,500 t (2,500 long tons) at deep load
- Length: 366 ft (111.6 m) (waterline); 371 ft (113.1 m) (overall)
- Beam: 42 ft (12.8 m)
- Draught: 13.17 ft (4.0 m) normal; 14 ft (4.3 m) deep load
- Propulsion: 2-shaft English Electric geared steam turbines; 2 Babcock & Wilcox water-tube boilers; 30,000 shp (22,000 kW)
- Speed: 28 knots (52 km/h; 32 mph)
- Range: 4,750 nautical miles (8,800 km; 5,470 mi) at 14 knots (26 km/h; 16 mph)
- Complement: 249
- Sensors & processing systems: 1 × SPS-12 air search radar; 1 × SPS-10B surface search radar; 1 × Sperry Mk.2 navigation radar; 1 × SQS-501 high frequency bottom profiler sonar; 1 × SQS-502 high frequency mortar control sonar; 1 × SQS-503 hull mounted active search sonar; 1 × SQS-10 hull mounted active search sonar; 1 × Mk.69 gunnery control system with SPG-48 director forward; 1 × GUNAR Mk.64 GFCS with on-mount SPG-48 director aft
- Electronic warfare & decoys: 1 × DAU HF/DF (high frequency direction finder)
- Armament: 1 × 3-inch/70 Mk.6 Vickers twin mount forward; 1 × 3-inch/50 Mk.22 FMC twin mount aft; 2 × Limbo Mk 10 3-barrelled ASW mortars; 2 × single Mk.2 "K-gun" homing torpedo launchers (though never carried torpedoes for them); 1 × 103 mm Bofors illumination rocket launchers

HMCS Kootenay was a Restigouche-class destroyer escort that served in the Royal Canadian Navy and Canadian Forces from 1959 until 1996. She was the fifth ship in her class and the second vessel to carry the designation HMCS Kootenay. The ship suffered two serious incidents in her career: a 1969 explosion and ensuing fire that killed nine, and a 1989 collision that required the complete replacement of her bow. Following her service, the ship was sunk as an artificial reef.

== Design and description ==
Based on the preceding St. Laurent-class design, the Restigouches had the same hull and propulsion, but different weaponry. Initially the St. Laurent class had been planned to be 14 ships. However the order was halved, and the following seven were redesigned to take into improvements made on the St. Laurents. As time passed, their design diverged further from that of the St. Laurents.

The ships had a displacement of 2,000 tonnes (2,000 long tons), 2,500 t (2,500 long tons) at deep load. They were designed to be 112 metres (366 ft) long with a beam of 13 metres (42 ft) and a draught of 4.01 metres (13 ft 2 in). The Restigouches had a complement of 214.

The Restigouches were by powered by two English Electric geared steam turbines, each driving a propeller shaft, using steam provided by two Babcock & Wilcox boilers. They generated 22,000 kilowatts (30,000 shp) giving the vessels a maximum speed of 28 knots (52 km/h; 32 mph).

The Restigouches were equipped with SPS-10, SPS-12, Sperry Mk 2 and SPG-48 radar along with SQS-501 and SQS-503 sonar.

=== Armament ===
The Restigouches diverged from the St. Laurents in their weaponry. The Restigouches were equipped with two twin mounts of Vickers 3-inch (76 mm)/70 calibre Mk 6 dual-purpose guns forward and maintained a single twin mount of 3-inch/50 calibre Mk 22 guns aft used in the preceding class. (Note: Calibre denotes the length of the barrel. In this case, 50 calibre means that the gun barrel is 50 times as long as it is in diameter) A Mk 69 fire control director was added to control the new guns. They were also armed with two Limbo Mk 10 mortars and two single Bofors 40 mm guns. However, the 40 mm guns were dropped in the final design.

The destroyers were also equipped beginning in 1958 with Mk 43 homing torpedoes in an effort to increase the distance between the ships and their targets. The Mk 43 torpedo had a range of 4,100 metres (4,500 yd) at 15 knots (28 km/h; 17 mph). They were pitched over the side by a modified depth charge thrower.

=== Improved Restigouche Escorts (IRE) ===
As part of the 1964 naval program, the Royal Canadian Navy planned to improve the attack capabilities of the Restigouche class. Unable to convert the vessels to helicopter-carrying versions like the St. Laurents due to budget constraints, instead the Restigouches were to receive variable depth sonar (VDS) to improve their sonar range, placed on the stern, and the RUR-5 anti-submarine rocket (ASROC). The destroyers also received a stepped lattice mast. Called the Improved Restigouche Escorts (IRE), Terra Nova was the first to undergo conversion, beginning in May 1965. The conversion took ten months to complete, followed by sea trials. The sea trials delayed the conversion of the next ship for four years. By 1969, the budget for naval programs had been cut and only four out of the seven (Terra Nova, Restigouche, Gatineau and Kootenay) would get upgraded to IRE standards and the remaining three (Chaudière, Columbia, and St. Croix) were placed in reserve.

The ASROC launcher replaced the 3 in/50 cal twin mount and one Mk 10 Limbo mortar aft. The ASROC was a rocket-propelled Mk 44 torpedo that had a minimum range of 820 metres (900 yd) and a maximum range of 9,100 metres (10,000 yd). The Mk 44 torpedo had a weight of 193 kilograms (425 lb), was 2.5 metres (100 in) long and carried a 34-kilogram (75 lb) warhead. The torpedo itself had a maximum range of 5,500 metres (6,000 yd) at 30 knots (56 km/h; 35 mph). The torpedo was acoustically guided.

=== Destroyer Life Extension (DELEX) ===
The Destroyer Life Extension (DELEX) refit for the four surviving Restigouches was announced in 1978. An effort by Maritime Command to update their existing stock of naval escorts, the DELEX program affected 16 ships in total and came in several different formats depending on the class of ship it was being applied to. On average, the DELEX refit cost $24 million per ship. For the Restigouches this meant updating their sensor, weapon and communications systems. The class received the new ADLIPS tactical data system, new radar and fire control systems and satellite navigation. They were also fitted with a triple torpedo tube mounting to use the new Mk 46 torpedo. The ships began undergoing their DELEX refits in the early 1980s. However, by the time the ships emerged from their refits, they were already obsolete as the Falklands War had changed the way surface battles were fought.

== Construction and career ==
Kootenay, named for a river in British Columbia, was laid down on 21 August 1952 by Burrard Dry Dock, North Vancouver, British Columbia. The ship was launched on 15 June 1954, the first of her class to do so. Kootenay was commissioned into the Royal Canadian Navy on 7 March 1959 at North Vancouver with the classification DDE 258.

Kootenay transferred to the east coast following work ups. She was named the Senior Officer Ship of the escort for the royal yacht HMY Britannia which brought Queen Elizabeth II to and around Canada for a royal visit in 1959. Following workups she joined the Fifth Canadian Escort Squadron. In August 1960, the destroyer escort, along with sister ships Terra Nova, St. Croix and Gatineau, took part in the 500th anniversary of Prince Henry the Navigator's death off Lisbon. In March 1961, the destroyer escort was among the ships that took part in a combined naval exercise with the United States Navy off Nova Scotia. In January 1966, with the restructuring of the Royal Canadian Navy into Maritime Command, Kootenay was assigned to the First Canadian Escort Squadron.

=== Explosion ===
On 23 October 1969 Kootenay was operating in European waters with a Canadian task group comprising the aircraft carrier Bonaventure and seven other destroyer escorts. The task group was returning to Canada, transiting the English Channel when Kootenay and Saguenay separated from the rest of the ships to perform sea trials of their engines, roughly 200 miles (320 km) off Plymouth, United Kingdom. Following the completion of Saguenay's trials, Kootenay began hers at 0810, going to maximum speed. By 0821, the starboard gearbox had reached critical temperature level of approximately 650 °C (1,202 °F) and exploded. The explosion and resultant fire killed seven and injured 53 others; several had facial and body hair entirely burnt off. Two others died later of injuries suffered during the fire. While the fire burned, the ship turned in large circles at full speed for 40 minutes, and the intense heat created a bulge in the starboard side of the vessel. Flares were fired to alert other ships, and Saguenay and Bonaventure responded to Kootenay's distress, airlifting supplies and personnel to the destroyer.

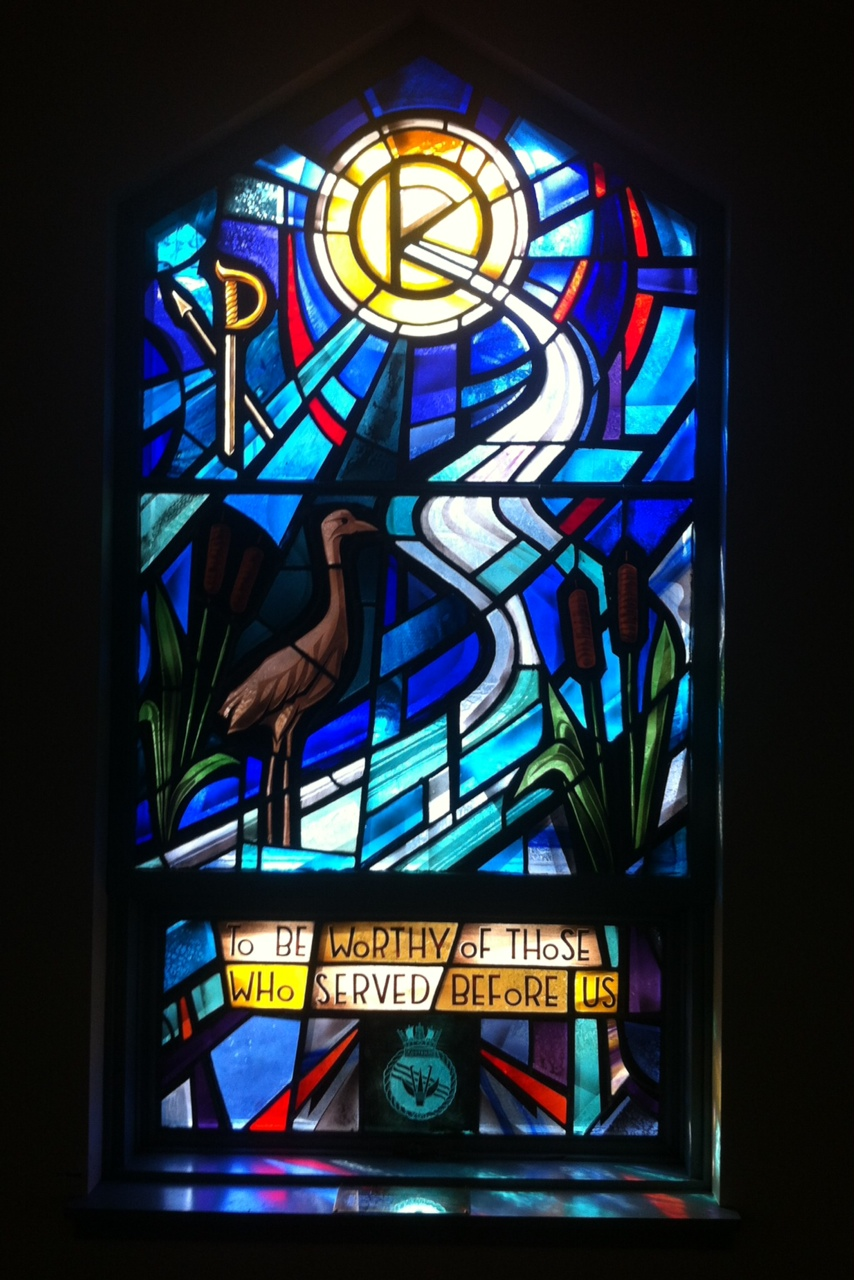
HMCS Kootenay window CFB Halifax

The fire was brought under control by 1010 and extinguished between 1030 and 1100. The ship was towed to Plymouth by the Royal Navy tug Samsonia. Her propellers were removed there and she was then towed to Halifax, Nova Scotia by the salvage tug Elbe, leaving Plymouth on 16 November. Kootenay arrived at Halifax on 27 November. This event is considered the Royal Canadian Navy's worst peacetime accident. The event also marked the last time Canadian military personnel were buried overseas, as four of the sailors killed were buried in the United Kingdom. Following this event, policy was changed so that all Canadian military personnel are returned to Canada should they perish while on deployment. The Royal Canadian Navy's damage control training centre for Maritime Forces Atlantic was named Damage Control Training Facility Kootenay (DCTF Kootenay) in honour of this incident.

=== Return to service ===
While under repairs for the explosion damage, the ship underwent her IRE conversion. The ship returned to service on 7 January 1972. She transferred to the west coast, based out of Esquimalt, British Columbia, arriving on 12 February 1973. This was part of the re-ordering of naval forces following the Unification of the Canadian Armed Forces in 1968, where four Restigouche-class vessels were transferred to the west coast, to replace the Mackenzie-class destroyers in the Second Canadian Escort Squadron. Later in 1973, Kootenay and Terra Nova were deployed off the coast of Vietnam as part of the Canadian contribution to the International Commission of Control and Supervision following the end of the Vietnam War. In July 1978, Kootenay assisted the Royal Canadian Mounted Police in intercepting $28 million worth of marijuana off the coast of British Columbia.

In October 1981, Kootenay, along with the replenishment ship Provider, tracked a Soviet force operating in the Gulf of Alaska. They were later joined by the U.S. destroyer USS Fife.

In November 1981, cracks were discovered in the superheater headers of the St. Laurent-class destroyer Ottawa. The Restigouche-class vessels were inspected for similar damage; Kootenay was found to also suffer from this issue, and was repaired within 6 months. On 1 June 1989, Kootenay collided with the merchant vessel MV Nord Pol in fog approximately 28 miles off Cape Flattery. The destroyer escort suffered a 3 by 16 feet (0.91 m × 4.88 m) gash in her bow above the waterline. In order to fix the damage, her bow was removed and replaced with that of sister ship Chaudière which was out of service at the time. Repairs were completed on 6 June 1989. Though Maritime Command absolved the commanding officer of blame, the British Columbia Supreme Court found the ship to be mostly at fault for the collision in a 1996 decision.

In June 1990 Kootenay, as part of Canadian task group, visited Vladivostok, from 3–7 June. She was among the first Canadian warships to do so since the Second World War. In 1994, the destroyer escort was deployed off the coast of Haiti to enforce the blockade sanctioned by the United Nations. She arrived on 13 July and remained until 15 September, returning to Esquimalt.

The ship was paid off on 18 December 1996. She was sold for use as an artificial reef. On 6 November 2000, she was towed out of Esquimalt to be sunk as such off Puerto Vallarta, Mexico. The ship's bell is currently held by the CFB Esquimalt Naval & Military Museum in Esquimalt.

== See also ==
- List of ships of the Canadian Navy
- History of the Royal Canadian Navy
