= HMCS Chaudière (DDE 235) =

Restigouche-class destroyer of the Royal Canadian Navy

Coordinates: 49°37.694′N 123°48.699′W

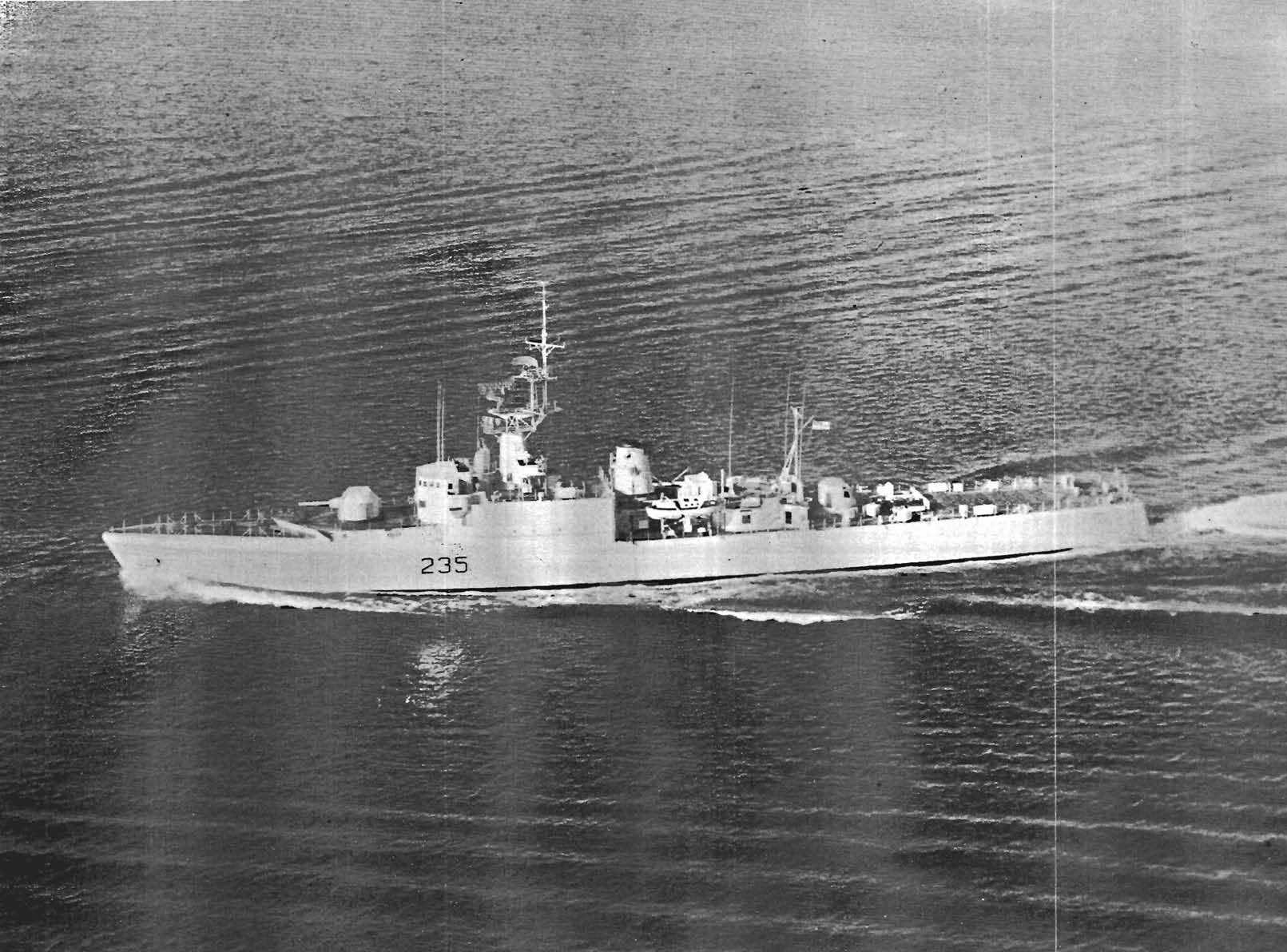

History

Canada
- Name: Chaudière
- Namesake: Chaudière River
- Builder: Halifax Shipyards Ltd., Halifax
- Laid down: 30 July 1953
- Launched: 13 November 1957
- Commissioned: 14 November 1959
- Decommissioned: 23 May 1974
- Identification: DDE 235
- Motto: La fortune sourit aux braves (Fortune smiles on the brave)
- Honours and awards: Atlantic 1944; Normandy 1944; Biscay 1944
- Fate: Sunk as artificial reef off British Columbia in 1992.
- Badge: Vert, three cotises in bend wavy or, debruised in the center with a plate voided, the inner edge evicted.

General characteristics
- Class & type: Restigouche-class destroyer
- Displacement: 2,800 t (2,800 long tons; 3,100 short tons) (deep load)
- Length: 366 ft (111.6 m)
- Beam: 42 ft (12.8 m)
- Draught: 14 ft (4.3 m)
- Propulsion: 2-shaft English-Electric geared steam turbines; 2 Babcock & Wilcox boilers; 30,000 shp (22,000 kW)
- Speed: 28 knots (52 km/h; 32 mph)
- Range: 4,750 nautical miles (8,800 km; 5,470 mi) at 14 knots (26 km/h; 16 mph)
- Complement: 214
- Sensors & processing systems: 1 × SPS-12 air search radar; 1 × SPS-10B surface search radar; 1 × Sperry Mk.2 navigation radar; 1 × SQS-501 high frequency bottom profiler sonar; 1 × SQS-502 high frequency mortar control sonar; 1 × SQS-503 hull mounted active search sonar; 1 × SQS-10 hull mounted active search sonar; 1 × Mk.69 gunnery control system with SPG-48 director forward; 1 × GUNAR Mk.64 GFCS with on-mount SPG-48 director aft
- Electronic warfare & decoys: 1 × DAU HF/DF (high frequency direction finder)
- Armament: 1 × 3-inch/70 Mk.6 Vickers twin mount forward; 1 × 3-inch/50 Mk.33 FMC twin mount aft; 2 × Mk NC 10 Limbo ASW mortars; 2 × single Mk.2 "K-gun" launchers with homing torpedoes; 1 × 103 mm Bofors illumination rocket launchers

HMCS Chaudière was a Restigouche-class destroyer and the second vessel of her class that served in the Royal Canadian Navy and later the Canadian Forces from 1959 to 1974. She was the second Canadian naval unit to bear this name. During the summer of 1974 she along with her sister ship HMCS Columbia served as the base of operations for the Esquimalt Sea Cadet Camp while being docked at the DND jetty in Colwood. This location was across the harbour from the main site of CFB Esquimalt. Following the vessel's decommissioning, the ship was used as a source for spare parts for the other surviving members of her class. In 1991, Chaudière was sold for use as an artificial reef and sunk off the coast of British Columbia.

== Design and description ==
Based on the preceding St. Laurent-class design, the Restigouches had the same hull and propulsion, but different weaponry. Initially the St. Laurent class had been planned to be 14 ships. However the order was halved, and the following seven were redesigned to take into improvements made on the St. Laurents. As time passed, their design diverged further from that of the St. Laurents.

The ships had a displacement of 2,000 tonnes (2,000 long tons), 2,500 t (2,500 long tons) at deep load. They were designed to be 112 metres (366 ft) long with a beam of 13 metres (42 ft) and a draught of 4.01 metres (13 ft 2 in). The Restigouches had a complement of 214.

The Restigouches were by powered by two English Electric geared steam turbines, each driving a propeller shaft, using steam provided by two Babcock & Wilcox boilers. They generated 22,000 kilowatts (30,000 shp) giving the vessels a maximum speed of 28 knots (52 km/h; 32 mph).

The Restigouches were equipped with SPS-10, SPS-12, Sperry Mk 2 and SPG-48 radar along with SQS-501 and SQS-503 sonar.

=== Armament ===
The Restigouches diverged from the St. Laurents in their weaponry. The Restigouches were equipped with two twin mounts of Vickers 3-inch (76 mm)/70 calibre Mk 6 dual-purpose guns forward and maintained a single twin mount of 3-inch/50 calibre Mk 22 guns aft used in the preceding class. (Note: Calibre denotes the length of the barrel. In this case, 50 calibre means that the gun barrel is 50 times as long as its bore diameter) A Mk 69 fire control director was added to control the new guns. They were also armed with two Limbo Mk 10 mortars and two single Bofors 40 mm guns. However the 40 mm guns were dropped in the final design.

From 1958 the destroyers were also equipped with Mk 43 homing torpedoes to increase the effective range of the weapons. The Mk 43 torpedo had a range of 4,100 metres (4,500 yd) at 15 knots (28 km/h; 17 mph). They were launched by a modified depth charge thrower.

== Service history ==
Chaudière was laid down on 30 July 1953 by Halifax Shipyards at Halifax, Nova Scotia. Named for a river in Quebec, she was the last of her class. The ship was launched on 13 November 1957. While under construction the escort suffered a fire which caused $200,000 in damage in September 1958. On 4 October 1958, a visiting engineer died after falling. The ship commissioned on 14 November 1959 at Halifax with the classification DDE 235. Prime Minister John Diefenbaker was a guest of honour at the ceremony.

Upon commissioning, the ship was assigned to the Fifth Canadian Escort Squadron. In March 1961, the destroyer escort was among the ships that took part in a combined naval exercise with the United States Navy off Nova Scotia. Chaudière underwent shock testing off Florida in 1962. In February 1964, the ship took part in the NATO naval exercise "Magic Lantern" off Gibraltar.

Following the unification of the Canadian Armed Forces, and the change from the Royal Canadian Navy to Maritime Command, Chaudière was transferred to the west coast to join the Second Canadian Escort Squadron. On 2 October 1967, she left Halifax to travel to Esquimalt.

Initially all seven Restigouche-class ships were intended to be upgraded to the IRE refit, however due to financial reasons, Chaudière's conversion was cut and by 1970, the ship was reduced to a training ship. On 23 May 1974, Chaudière was paid off and used as a source for parts for the other members of the class.

In 1989, Chaudière's sister ship Kootenay collided with a merchant vessel and her bow was severely damaged. To repair the damage, Kootenay's damaged bow was removed and Chaudière's was installed in place.

In September 1991, the Canadian government sold the former destroyer escort to the Artificial Reef Society of British Columbia for $1 for use as an artificial reef. The project to use the ship was saved mainly by donations from the community after government funding was cut. The ship was sunk in Sechelt Inlet, British Columbia on 5 December 1992.
