= Restigouche-class destroyer =

Canadian warship class (1958–1998)

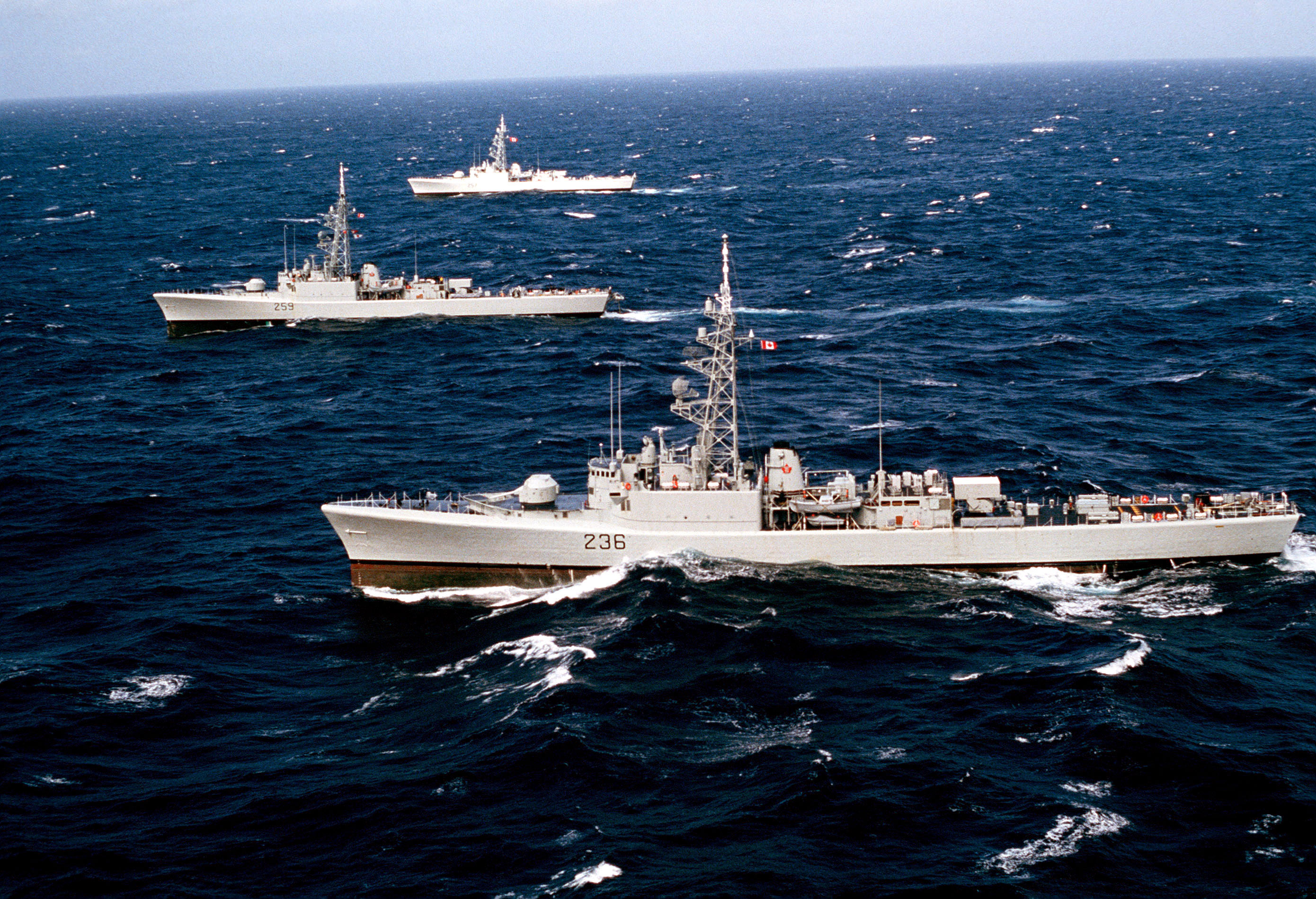
- Restigouche, Terra Nova and Gatineau in 1983

Class overview
- Name: Restigouche class
- Builders: Canadian Vickers, Montreal; Burrard Dry Dock, North Vancouver; Halifax Shipyards, Halifax; Marine Industries, Sorel; Davie Shipbuilding, Lauzon; Victoria Machinery Depot, Victoria
- Operators: Royal Canadian Navy; Canadian Forces
- Preceded by: St. Laurent class
- Succeeded by: Mackenzie class
- In commission: 7 June 1958 – 1 July 1998
- Planned: 7
- Completed: 7
- Retired: 7

General characteristics
- Type: Destroyer escort
- Displacement: As built: 2,390 t (2,352.3 long tons) (normal); 2,800 t (2,755.8 long tons) (deep load); After IRE: 2,900 t (2,854.2 long tons) (deep load)
- Length: 366 ft (111.6 m) (waterline); 371 ft (113.1 m) (overall)
- Beam: 42 ft (12.8 m)
- Draught: 13.17 ft (4.0 m) normal; 14 ft (4.3 m) deep load
- Propulsion: 2 × shafts; 2 × English Electric (John Inglis & Company) geared steam turbines; 2 × Babcock & Wilcox boilers; 30,000 shp (22,000 kW)
- Speed: 28 knots (52 km/h)
- Range: 4,750 nautical miles (8,800 km) at 14 knots (26 km/h)
- Complement: As built: 249; After IRE/DELEX: 214
- Sensors & processing systems: As built: 1 × SPS-12 air search radar; 1 × SPS-10B surface search radar; 1 × Sperry Mk.2 navigation radar; 1 × SQS-501 high frequency bottom profiler sonar; 1 × SQS-502 high frequency mortar control sonar; 1 × SQS-503 hull mounted active search sonar; 1 × SQS-10 hull mounted active search sonar; 1 × Mk.69 gunnery control system with SPG-48 director forward; 1 × GUNAR Mk.64 GFCS with on-mount SPG-48 director aft; After IRE: 1 × SPS-12 air search radar; 1 × SPS-10B surface search radar; 1 × Sperry Mk.2 navigation radar; 1 × SQS-501 high frequency bottom profiler sonar; 1 × SQS-502 high frequency mortar control sonar; 1 × SQS-503 hull mounted active search sonar; 1 × SQS-10 hull mounted active search sonar; 1 × AQA-5 Jezebel passive tracer sonar; 1 × Mk.69 gunnery control system with SPG-48 director forward; After DELEX: 1 × Marconi SPS 502 air search radar; 1 × Raytheon SPS 10D surface search radar; 1 × Sperry Mk.127 E navigation radar; 1 × SQS-505 hull sonar; 1 × SQS 505 VDS sonar; 1 × Mk.69 gunnery control system with SPG-515 director forward; After Gulf War: 1 × Marconi SPS 502 air search radar; 1 × Raytheon SPS 10D surface search radar; 1 × Sperry Mk.127 E navigation radar; 1 × SQS-505 hull sonar; 1 × SQS-505 VDS sonar; 1 × C-Tech mine avoidance sonar; 1 × Mk.69 gunnery control system with SPG-515 director forward
- Electronic warfare & decoys: As built: 1 × DAU HF/DF (high frequency direction finder); After IRE: 1 × ULQ-6 jammer; 1 × WLR-1C radar analyzer; 1 × UPD-501 radar detector; 1 × SRD-501 HF/DF; After DELEX: 1 × CANEWS; 1 × ULQ-6 jammer; After Gulf War: 1 × CANEWS; 1 × ULQ-6 jammer; 1 × ALR-74 threat warning
- Armament: As built: 1 × 3"/70 Mk.6 Vickers twin mount forward; 1 × 3 in (76 mm) Mk.33 FMC twin mount aft; 2 × Mk NC 10 Limbo ASW mortars; 2 × single Mk.2 "K-gun" launchers with homing torpedoes; 1 × 103 mm Bofors illumination rocket launchers; After IRE/DELEX: 1 × 3"/70 Mk.6 Vickers twin mount forward; 1 × Mk.112 ASROC octuple launcher; 1 × Mk NC 10 Limbo ASW mortars; 2 × Mk.32 triple torpedo launchers firing Mk.46 Mod 5 torpedoes; After Gulf War: 1 × 3"/70 Mk.6 Vickers twin mount forward; 2 × Harpoon quad SSM launchers; shoulder-launched Blowpipe and Javelin SAMs; 1 × Phalanx CIWS; 2 × 40 mm/60 Bofors guns; 6 × .50 cal. machine guns; 2 × Mk.32 triple torpedo launchers firing Mk.46 Mod 5 torpedoes

The Restigouche-class destroyer was a class of seven destroyer escorts that served the Royal Canadian Navy and later the Canadian Forces from the late-1950s to the late-1990s. All seven vessels in the class were named after rivers in Canada.

The Royal Canadian Navy began planning the St. Laurent-class destroyer in the late 1940s and originally intended to procure fourteen vessels. Delays in design and construction saw the number of vessels for the St. Laurent class halved to seven. The seven remaining vessels were redesigned as the Restigouche class, taking into account design improvements found during construction of the St. Laurents. The seven ships of the class were commissioned between 1958 and 1959.

== Design and description ==
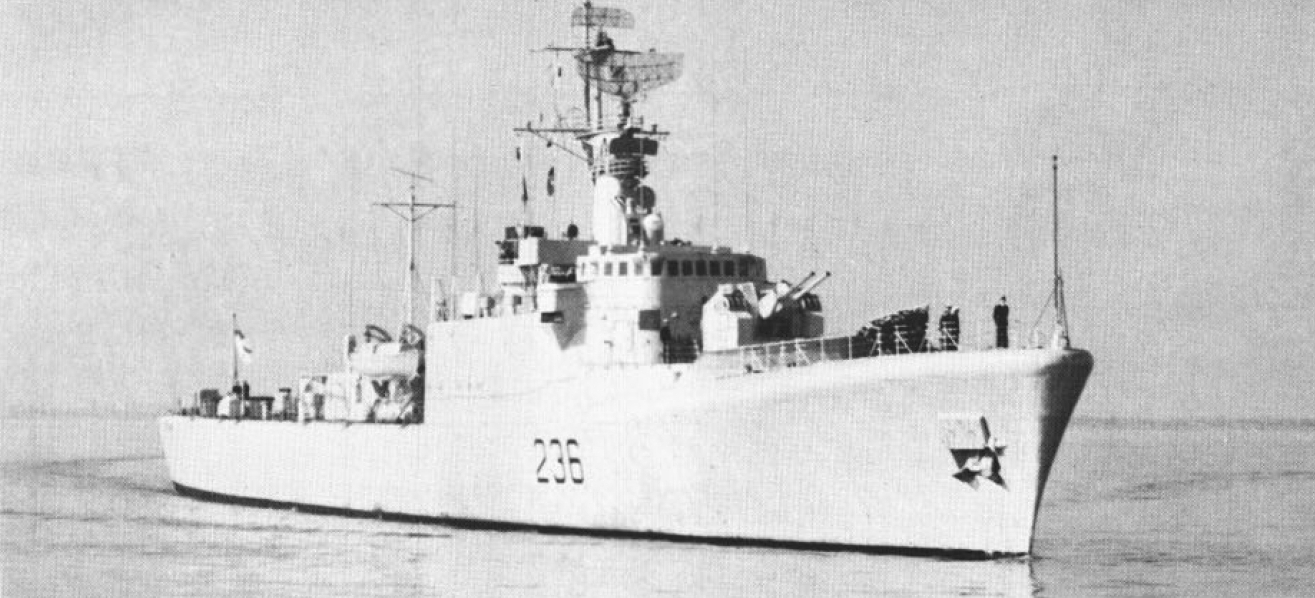
Gatineau in 1974.

Based on the preceding St. Laurent-class design, the Restigouches had the same hull and propulsion, but different weaponry. Initially the St. Laurent class had been planned to be 14 ships. However the order was halved, and the following seven were redesigned to incorporate improvements made on the St. Laurents. As time passed, their design diverged further from that of the St. Laurents.

The ships had a displacement of 2,000 tonnes (2,000 long tons), 2,500 t (2,500 long tons) at deep load. They were designed to be 112 metres (366 ft) long with a beam of 13 metres (42 ft) and a draught of 4.01 metres (13 ft 2 in). The Restigouches had a complement of 214.

The Restigouches were powered by two English Electric geared steam turbines, each driving a propeller shaft, using steam provided by two Babcock & Wilcox boilers. They generated 22,000 kilowatts (30,000 shp) giving the vessels a maximum speed of 28 knots (52 km/h; 32 mph).

The Restigouches were equipped with SPS-10, SPS-12, Sperry Mk 2 and SPG-48 radar along with SQS-501 and SQS-503 sonar.

=== Armament ===
The Restigouches diverged from the St. Laurents in their weaponry. The Restigouches were equipped with one twin mount of Vickers 3-inch (76 mm)/70 calibre Mk 6 dual-purpose guns forward and maintained one twin mount of 3-inch/50 calibre Mk 22 guns aft used in the preceding class. (Note: Calibre denotes the length of the barrel. In this case, 50 calibre means that the gun barrel is 50 times as long as it is in diameter) A Mk 69 fire control director was added to control the new guns. They were also armed with two Limbo Mk 10 mortars and two single Bofors 40 mm guns. However the 40 mm guns were dropped in the final design.

The 3 in/70 Mk 6 gun was initially designed by Vickers for use aboard the Tiger-class cruiser. The guns weighed 1,200 kilograms (2,650 lb), had 1,000 rounds stored and could fire 90 rounds per minute. The gun could fire a projectile that weighed 16.4 kilograms (36 lb) at a muzzle velocity of 1,000 metres per second (3,400 ft/s). Each twin mount had a 360° train rate, was capable of elevation between −15° and 90°, and able to elevate at 30° per second. The 3 in/70 mounting was placed in the 'A' position, and could fire a round up to 16.9 kilometres (10.5 mi).

The 3 in/50 Mk 22 dual-purpose gun was a United States design that dated back to the Second World War. Each gun weighed 800 kilograms (1,760 lb). The gun fired a projectile that weighed 10.9 kilograms (24 lb) at a muzzle velocity of 820 metres per second (2,700 ft/s). The guns were placed in a Mk 33 twin mount capable of traversing 360° and with an elevation range of −15° to 85°. The 3 in/50 mounting was placed in the 'Y' position. Each gun could fire up to 50 rounds per minute up to 13 kilometres (8 mi).

The Limbo was a British-designed three-barrel mortar capable of launching a projectile shell between 370–910 metres (400–1,000 yd). Placed on stabilized mountings, the projectiles always entered the water at the same angle. The total weight of the shell was 180 kilograms (390 lb).

The destroyers were also equipped beginning in 1958 with Mk 43 homing torpedoes in an effort to increase the distance between the ships and their targets. The Mk 43 torpedo had a range of 4,100 metres (4,500 yd) at 15 knots (28 km/h; 17 mph). They were pitched over the side by a modified depth charge thrower.

=== Improved Restigouche Escorts (IRE) ===
As part of the 1964 naval program, the Royal Canadian Navy planned to improve the attack capabilities of the Restigouche class. Unable to convert the vessels to helicopter-carrying versions like the St. Laurents due to budget constraints, instead the Restigouches were to receive variable depth sonar (VDS) to improve their sonar range, placed on the stern, and the RUR-5 anti-submarine rocket (ASROC). The destroyers also received a stepped lattice mast. Called the Improved Restigouche Escorts (IRE), Terra Nova was the first to undergo conversion, beginning in May 1965. The conversion took ten months to complete, followed by sea trials. The sea trials delayed the conversion of the next ship for four years. By 1969, the budget for naval programs had been cut and only four out of the seven (Terra Nova, Restigouche, Gatineau and Kootenay) would get upgraded to IRE standards and the remaining three (Chaudière, Columbia, and St. Croix) were placed in reserve.

The ASROC launcher replaced the 3 in/50 cal twin mount and one Mk 10 Limbo mortars aft. The ASROC was rocket-propelled Mk 44 torpedo that had a minimum range of 820 metres (900 yd) and a maximum range of 9,100 metres (10,000 yd). The Mk 44 torpedo had a weight of 193 kilograms (425 lb), was 2.5 metres (100 in) long and carried a 34-kilogram (75 lb) warhead. The torpedo itself had a maximum range of 5,500 metres (6,000 yd) at 30 knots (56 km/h; 35 mph). The torpedo was acoustically guided. The ships carried eight reloads.

=== Destroyer Life Extension (DELEX) ===
The Destroyer Life Extension (DELEX) refit for the four surviving Restigouches was announced in 1978. An effort by Maritime Command to update their existing stock of naval escorts, the DELEX program affected 16 ships in total and came in several different formats depending on the class of ship it was being applied to. On average, the DELEX refit cost $24 million per ship. For the Restigouches this meant updating their sensor, weapon and communications systems. The class received the new ADLIPS tactical data system, new radar and fire control systems and satellite navigation. The ships had the Mk 127E navigational radar, SPS-502 radar and AN/SPG-515 fire control radar and Mk 69 gunnery control system installed. The upper part of the lattice mast was removed and replaced by a pole mast with a TACAN antenna fitted to it. The AN/SQS-505 C3 sonar dome was fared into the hull and the 103 mm (4 in) Bofors illumination rocket system was removed, replaced by a Super RBOC chaff system.

The class were also fitted with two triple 533-millimetre (21 in) Mk 32 torpedo tube mountings to use the new Mk 46 torpedo. They were situated between the ASROC launcher and the Limbo mortar well. The ships began undergoing their DELEX refits in the early 1980s. However, by the time the ships emerged from their refits, they were already obsolete as the Falklands War had changed the way surface battles were fought.

=== Gulf War refit ===
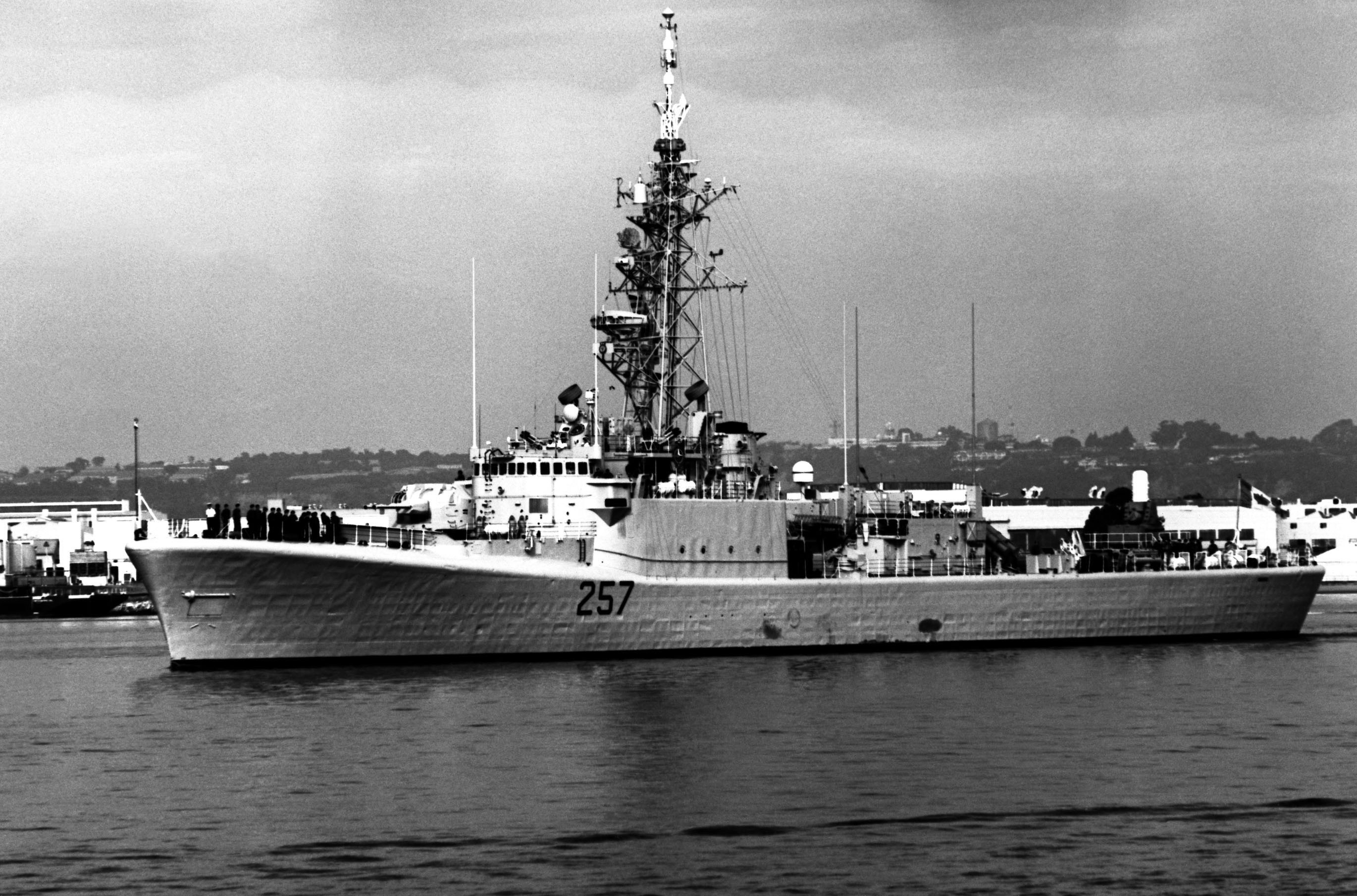
Restigouche in 1992.

With the advent of the Gulf War in August 1990, Maritime Command was asked to have a fleet of ships available to send to the Persian Gulf, preferably three ships. The Iroquois-class destroyer Athabaskan and the replenishment ship Protecteur would be made part of the task force, however all the other Iroquois-class vessels were in refit. Maritime Command chose from among the remaining fleet the vessel with the best electronic countermeasures suite, Terra Nova, to deploy with the task force. Terra Nova was quickly altered to make her ready for an active war zone. The ship's ASROC system was landed and instead two quad Harpoon surface-to-surface missile system was installed. A Mk 15 Phalanx close-in weapon system was placed on the quarterdeck in place of the landed Limbo ASW mortar and two 40 mm/60 calibre Boffin guns were installed in single mounts where the ship's boats were. The ship was also fitted with new chaff, electronic and communications systems. Restigouche received a similar refit before deploying as Terra Nova's intended replacement in the Persian Gulf in 1991.

== Service history ==
Seven ships were ordered as part of the 1951-2 budget, as repeat St. Laurents. Constructed at several shipyards across the country, the first to enter service was the lead ship of the class, Restigouche on 7 June 1958, followed by St. Croix later in 1958 and Gatineau, Kootenay, Columbia, Terra Nova and Chaudière in 1959. While still in builder's hand, Restigouche suffered a collision with the freighter Manchester Port in November 1957. Following her commissioning she was present at the opening of the Saint Lawrence Seaway in 1959, alongside Terra Nova.

In 1960, Terra Nova and St. Croix escorted the royal yacht HMY Britannia, carrying Queen Elizabeth II on a royal visit. In 1968, Gatineau became the first Canadian warship to become a member of STANAVFORLANT, the standing NATO naval force in the Atlantic. On 23 October 1969, while in European waters, Kootenay suffered a gearbox explosion that killed 7 and injured 53 of the crew. This was Canada's worst peacetime naval accident.

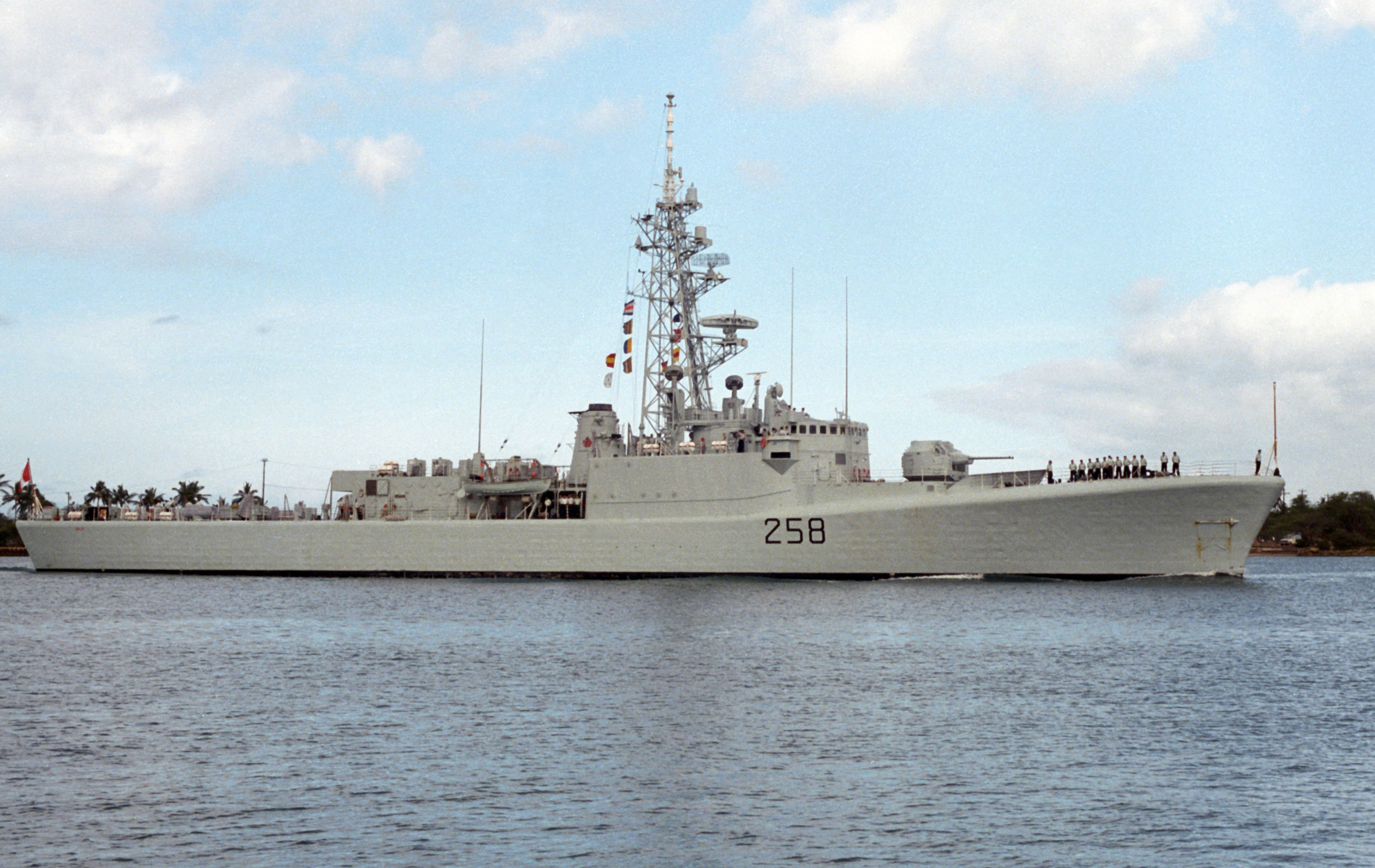
Kootenay at Pearl Harbor in 1986

Terra Nova was the first to undergo IRE conversion, beginning in May 1965. In September 1969, Gatineau began her IRE conversion. While Kootenay was being repaired following the explosion, she began her IRE conversion. Restigouche began her IRE conversion in 1970. Of the three ships that did not undergo the conversion, Chaudière was reduced a training ship in 1970. St. Croix and Columbia were paid off on 15 February and 18 February 1974 respectively and placed in reserve. St. Croix had her propellers and guns removed and was turned into a fleet school from 1984 until 1990. Columbia was fixed so that her engines could run at dockside while being unable to move. Chaudière was paid off on 23 May 1974 and used for spare parts for the remaining ships. All three were discarded in the early 1990s, with Chaudière and Columbia become artificial reefs while St. Croix was broken up.

Gatineau was the first to undergo her DELEX refit, beginning in September 1981. In November 1981, after cracks were discovered in the superheater heads of Ottawa, all of Canada's steam-driven destroyers were inspected. Of the vessels in the class, Kootenay and Terra Nova were found to have the same problem. They were repaired within six months. Terra Nova underwent her DELEX refit beginning in November 1983, followed by Restigouche beginning in December 1984, Kootenay in 1984. In June 1989, Kootenay collided with the merchant vessel Nord Pol which severely damaged her bow. Her bow was removed and replaced with the bow of Chaudière.

In 1990, Kootenay was among the Canadian task group that visited the Soviet Union for the first time since World War II. That same year Terra Nova was modified for service in the Gulf War. Her intended replacement in the Persian Gulf, Restigouche, also received the modifications, however was instead redirected to STANAVFORLANT. However, in 1992, the ship was deployed to the Red Sea as part of a multinational force. In 1993, Gatineau was among the Canadian vessels assigned to enforce United Nations sanctions on Haiti. In 1994, Kootenay was sent to enforce the sanctions on Haiti. In 1995, Gatineau took part in the NATO naval exercise Strong Resolve and in April that year, supported the Canadian Coast Guard in the Turbot War.

Restigouche was paid off on 31 August 1994. She was sunk off Acapulco, Mexico in June 2001. Kootenay was paid off on 18 December 1996 and was also sold for use as an artificial reef off Mexico. Gatineau and Terra Nova were paid off on 1 July 1998 and were sold for scrapping in October 2009.

== Ships in class ==
Construction data for the Restigouche-class destroyers
Ship	Pennant number	Builder	Laid down	Launched	Commissioned	Refits completed			Paid off	Fate
Ship	Pennant number	Builder	Laid down	Launched	Commissioned	IRE	DELEX	Persian Gulf	Paid off	Fate
Restigouche	DDE 257	Canadian Vickers, Montreal	15 July 1953	22 November 1954	7 June 1958	1972	29 November 1985	late 1990 or early 1991	31 August 1994	Sunk off Mexico in 2001.
Chaudière	DDE 235	Halifax Shipyards, Halifax, Nova Scotia	30 July 1953	13 November 1957	14 November 1959	Never	Never	Never	23 May 1974	Donated part of her bow to Kootenay in 1989. Sunk as an artificial reef off British Columbia in 1992.
Gatineau	DDE 236	Davie Shipbuilding, Lauzon, Quebec	30 April 1953	3 June 1957	17 February 1959	14 April 1971	12 November 1982	Never	1 July 1998	Scrapped at Pictou, Nova Scotia
St. Croix	DDE 256	Marine Industries, Sorel, Quebec	15 October 1954	17 November 1956	4 October 1958	21 October 1964	Never	Never	15 November 1974	Sold for scrap in 1991.
Kootenay	DDE 258	Burrard Dry Dock, North Vancouver, British Columbia	21 August 1952	15 June 1954	7 March 1959	7 January 1972	21 October 1983	Never	18 December 1996	Sunk as an artificial reef off Mexico in 2001.
Terra Nova	DDE 259	Victoria Machinery Depot, Victoria	14 November 1952	21 June 1955	6 June 1959	1968	9 November 1984	August–September 1990	1 July 1998	Scrapped at Pictou, Nova Scotia.
Columbia	DDE 260	Burrard Dry Dock, North Vancouver, British Columbia	11 June 1953	1 November 1956	7 November 1959	Never	Never	Never	18 February 1974	Sunk as an artificial reef off British Columbia in 1996.
