= HMCS Fraser (DDH 233) =

Destroyer of the Royal Canadian Navy

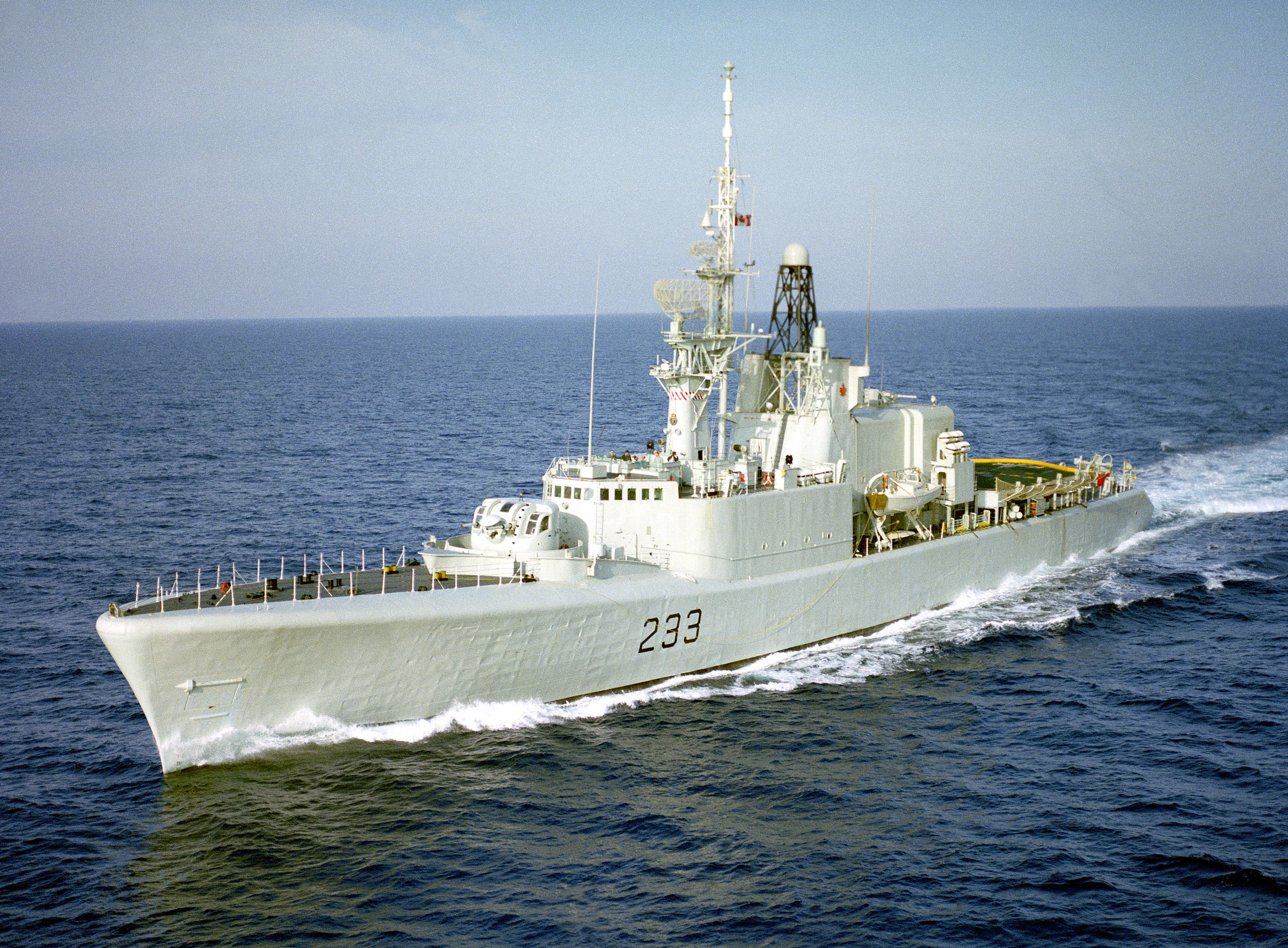
- HMCS Fraser (DDH 233) underway in 1983

History

Canada
- Name: Fraser
- Namesake: Fraser River
- Builder: Burrard Dry Dock, North Vancouver
- Laid down: 11 December 1951
- Launched: 19 February 1953
- Commissioned: 28 June 1957
- Decommissioned: 5 October 1994
- Reclassified: 22 October 1966 (as DDH)
- Home port: Halifax, Nova Scotia
- Motto: "Je suis pret"
- Honours and awards: Atlantic 1939–1940
- Fate: Scrapped by Marine Recycling Corporation, Port Colborne, Ontario 2010-2011
- Badge: Azure, a buck's head erased or, attired argent, charged on the shoulder with a maple leaf gules

General characteristics
- Type: St. Laurent-class destroyer escort
- Displacement: As DDE: 2263 tons (normal), 2800 tons (deep load); As DDH: 2260 tons (normal), 3051 tons (deep load)
- Length: 366 ft (111.6 m)
- Beam: 42 ft (12.8 m)
- Draught: As DDE: 13 ft (4.0 m); As DDH:14 ft (4.3 m)
- Propulsion: 2-shaft English-Electric geared steam turbines, 3 Babcock & Wilcox boilers 22,000 kW (30,000 shp)
- Speed: 28.5 knots (52.8 km/h)
- Range: 4,570 nautical miles (8,463.6 km) at 12 knots (22.2 km/h)
- Complement: As DDE: 249; As DDH: 213 plus 20 aircrew
- Sensors & processing systems: As DDE: 1 × SPS-12 air search radar; 1 × SPS-10B surface search radar; 1 × Sperry Mk.2 navigation radar; 1 × SQS-10 or −11 hull mounted active search and attack sonar; 1 × SQS-501 (Type 162) high frequency bottom profiling sonar; 1 × SQS-502 (Type 170) high frequency Limbo mortar control sonar; 1 × UQC-1B "Gertrude" underwater telephone; 1 × GUNAR (Mk.64 GFCS with 2 on-mount SPG-48 directors); As DDH: 1 × SPS-12 air search radar; 1 × SPS-10B surface search radar; 1 × Sperry Mk.2 navigation radar; 1 × URN 20 TACAN radar; 1 × SQS-10 or −11 hull mounted active search and attack sonar; 1 × SQS-501 (Type 162) high frequency bottom profiling sonar; 1 × SQS-502 (Type 170) high frequency Limbo mortar control sonar; 1 × SQS-504 VDS, medium frequency active search (except 233 after 1986); 1 × UQC-1B "Gertrude" underwater telephone; 1 × GUNAR (Mk.64 GFCS with 1 on-mount SPG-48 director)
- Electronic warfare & decoys: As DDE: 1 × DAU HF/DF (high frequency direction finder); As DDH: 1 × WLR 1C radar warning; 1 × UPD 501 radar detection; 1 × SRD 501 HF/DF
- Armament: As DDE: 2 × 3 in (76 mm) Mk.33 FMC twin mounts guns; 2 × 40 mm "Boffin" single mount guns; 2 × Mk NC 10 Limbo ASW mortars; 2 × single Mk.2 "K-gun" launchers with homing torpedoes; As DDH: 1 × 3"/50 Mk.33 FMC twin mount gun; 1 × Mk NC 10 Limbo ASW mortar; 2 × triple Mk.32 12.75 inch launchers firing Mk.44 or Mk.46 Mod 5 torpedoes
- Aircraft carried: As DDH: 1 × CH-124 Sea King
- Aviation facilities: As DDH: 1 × midships helicopter deck with Beartrap and hangar

HMCS Fraser (DDH 233) was a St. Laurent-class destroyer that served in the Royal Canadian Navy (RCN) and later the Canadian Forces from 1957 to 1994. Fraser was the last survivor of the St. Laurent-class destroyer, which were the first Canadian designed and built warships.

== Design and description ==
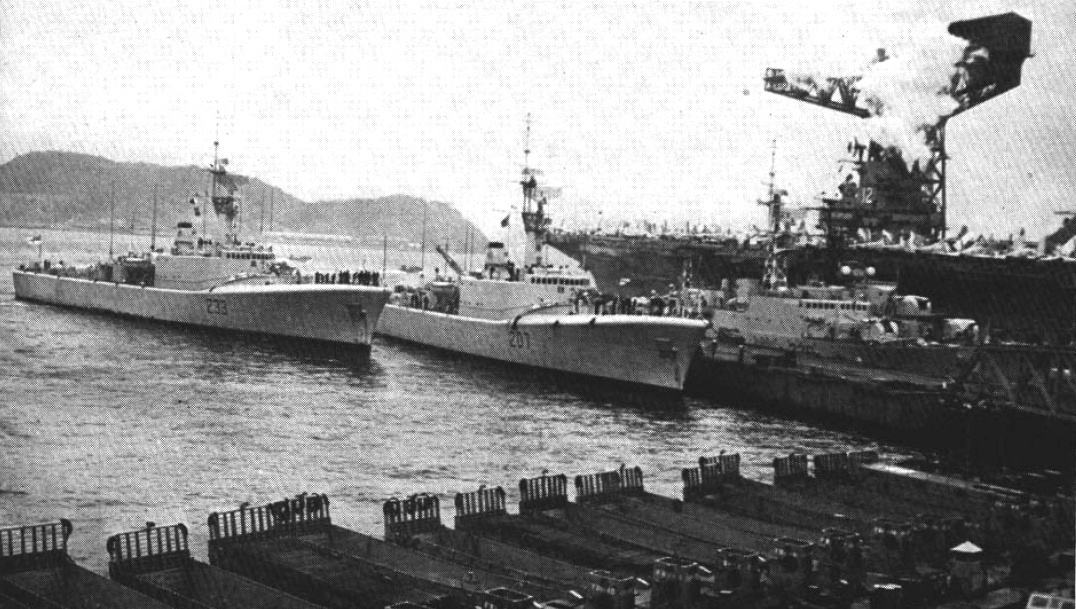
Two St. Laurent-class destroyers in their original configuration. Fraser is on the left

The need for the St. Laurent class came about in 1949 when Canada joined NATO and the Cold War was in its infancy. The Royal Canadian Navy (RCN) was assigned responsibility for anti-submarine warfare (ASW) and controlling sea space in the western North Atlantic. The St Laurent class were built to an operational requirement much like that which produced the British Type 12, and were powered by the same machinery plant. The rounded deck-edge forward was adopted to prevent ice forming. The vessels were designed to operate in harsh Canadian conditions. They were built to counter nuclear, biological and chemical attack conditions, which led to a design with a rounded hull, a continuous main deck, and the addition of a pre-wetting system to wash away contaminants. The living spaces on the ship were part of a "citadel" which could be sealed off from contamination for the crew safety. The ships were sometimes referred to as "Cadillacs" for their relatively luxurious crew compartments; these were also the first Canadian warships to have a bunk for every crew member since previous warship designs had used hammocks.

As built, the ships were 366 feet (112 m) long overall with a beam of 42 feet (13 m) and a draught of 13 feet 2 inches (4.01 m). The destroyer escorts displaced 2,263 tonnes (2,227 long tons) standard and 2,800 tonnes (2,800 long tons) at deep load. (Note: Conway's says 2,000 tons standard displacement, 2,600 deep load.) The destroyer escorts had a crew of 12 officers and 237 enlisted.

=== Armament ===
The St. Laurent class was fitted with twin 3-inch (76 mm)/L50 calibre guns in two mounts for engaging both surface and air targets. The ships were also fitted with two single-mounted 40 mm (1.6 in) guns. The class's anti-submarine armament consisted of a pair of triple-barreled Mk. NC 10 Limbo ASW mortars in a stern well. The stern well had a roller top to close it off from following seas. As with the British Type 12 design, the provision for long-range homing torpedoes (in this case BIDDER [Mk 20E] or the US Mark 35) were included. However, they were never fitted.

=== Machinery ===
The vessels of the St. Laurent class had two Babcock & Wilcox water tube boilers installed. The steam produced by these boilers was directed at two geared steam turbines which powered two shafts, providing 22,000 kilowatts (30,000 shp) to drive the ship at a maximum speed of 28.5 knots (52.8 km/h). The ships had an endurance of 4,570 nautical miles (8,460 km) at 12 knots (22 km/h).

=== DDH conversion ===
Following successful trials aboard the frigate Buckingham and sister ship Ottawa, plans to convert the St. Laurent class took shape. The development of the beartrap, installed in Assiniboine during her 1962–63 conversion, finalised the concept. By keeping the aircraft secure, the beartrap eliminated the need for deck handling from landing to the hangar, or from hangar to takeoff.

In the conversion to a helicopter-carrying vessel, Fraser was gutted except for machinery and some forward spaces. The hull was strengthened, and fuelling facilities for the helicopter and active fin stabilizers were installed. The fin stabilizers were to reduce roll in rough weather during helicopter operations. All seven St Laurents were fitted with helicopter platforms and SQS 504 Variable Depth Sonar (VDS). The single funnel was altered to twin stepped funnels to permit the forward extension of the helicopter hangar. To make room for the helicopter deck, the aft 3-inch mount and one of the Limbos were removed. The two 40 mm guns were also removed. Following the conversion, the displacement remained the same at standard load but at full load, it increased to 3,051 tonnes (3,003 long tons).

=== DELEX program ===
In the late 1970s, under the Destroyer Life Extension (DELEX) program was commissioned to upgrade ten of the St. Laurent-class ships with new electronics, machinery, and hull upgrades and repairs. However, only enough was done to keep the ships in service into the late 1980s. For the St. Laurents, this meant hull and machinery repairs only.

== Service history ==
Fraser's keel was laid down on 11 December 1951 at Burrard Dry Dock in North Vancouver, British Columbia. The ship was launched on 19 February 1953 and commissioned into the Royal Canadian Navy on 28 June 1957, initially carrying the hull number DDE 233 as a destroyer escort. Following her commissioning, the destroyer escort joined the Second Canadian Escort Squadron at Esquimalt, British Columbia. While transiting to Pearl Harbor in November 1960, the destroyer escort aided the crippled yacht Red Witch. Fraser remained with the vessel until the arrival of the United States Coast Guard. On 6 February 1965, Fraser underwent the first of two shock trials off the coast of Hawaii. The destroyer escort returned in April to undergo the second one, passing both of them.

Fraser began conversion to a destroyer helicopter escort on 2 July 1965 at Canadian Vickers in Montreal, Quebec, the last of her class to undergo the transformation. The refit finished, the ship was officially reclassed with hull number DDH 233 on 22 October 1966. The first helicopter landing aboard Fraser, made by a CH-124 Sea King, was performed on 15 June 1967. In October 1967, Fraser demonstrated the Canadian "beartrap" helicopter haul-down system during a visit to Washington, DC. In 1969, the ship represented Canada during the Spithead Review. In May 1973, the ship was placed in reserve, but was reactivated on 11 March 1974. The ship was sent to Davie Shipbuilding in Quebec and returned to operational service in Fall 1974. In 1976, Fraser was assigned to security duties associated with the 1976 Summer Olympics held in Montreal.

On 28 November 1980, Fraser rescued twelve British fisherman from the fishing vessel St Irene off the coast of the Netherlands. While on deployment in December with STANAVFORLANT, the NATO fleet in the Atlantic, Fraser was held at Portsmouth for use in the Skagerrak if NATO had needed to respond to a Soviet incursion into Poland. In 1981, Fraser returned to Canadian Vickers in Montreal on 19 October 1981 to undergo the DELEX refit. The ship completed this refit on 28 May 1982.

Following the refit, Fraser became a test ship. In 1986, the vessel was the testbed for the Experimental Towed Array Sonar System. In 1987, Fraser was the first Canadian ship to carry and was the first to test the NIXIE torpedo decoy system. The warship followed that with testing the TACAN antenna, for operating jointly with aircraft in combat areas. In 1988, the ship became the first to operate a HELTAS Sea King, a Sea King helicopter equipped with passive array sonar.

On 18 October 1993, Fraser was among the Canadian vessels deployed off the coast of Haiti to enforce United Nations sanctions. The destroyer escort returned to Canada in December before sailing to Haitian waters again in January 1994. On 10 January, the ship suffered a minor boiler room fire. Fraser continued to her patrol area until being relieved by Annapolis on 25 March. In July 1994, Fraser intercepted and seized the American fishing vessels Warrior and Alpha Omega II on the Grand Banks of Newfoundland after they were caught illegally fishing. On 13–14 September, while performing a fisheries patrol, the ship aided the sailing vessel Maja Romm, which had broken down.

The destroyer was decommissioned from active service in the Canadian Forces on 5 October 1994 and placed in category C reserve. The ship was used as a floating classroom at Halifax, replacing Assiniboine.

== Fate ==
=== Purchase by Artificial Reef Society of Nova Scotia ===
Fraser was declared surplus in the late 1990s by the Canadian Forces and given to the Artificial Reef Society of Nova Scotia (ARSNS) in 1998. ARSNS had never considered sinking Fraser as an artificial reef diving attraction and she was towed to Bridgewater where she was stored for possible use as a museum ship.

ARSNS had purchased the government wharf in Bridgewater on the east bank of the Lahave River, which became Fraser's home for close to 12 years. The society made the vessel available to for possible conversion to a museum ship, should funding be secured. The ship never opened as a museum, although guided tours were offered by appointment in 2003 and 2004. During that period, some groups such as the Sea Cadets, LaHave River Tourism Association, Atlantic Lighthouse Council, Bridgewater Fire Department, and Katimavik used the ship for events and the wardroom hosted meetings with visiting politicians. The ship was also used for some years as the site for the annual Canada Day fireworks display in Bridgewater.

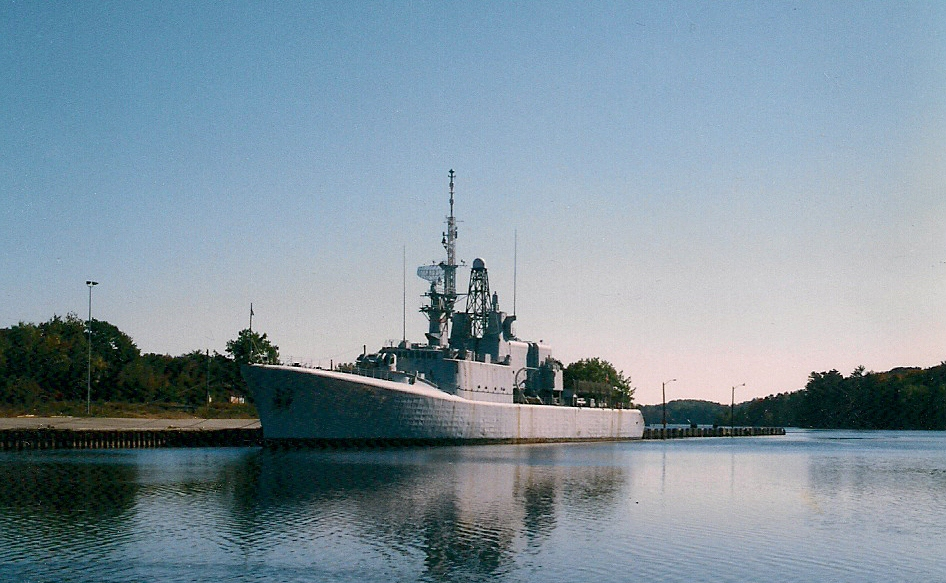
HMCS Fraser at Bridgewater, 1999.

In 1997, the Historic Sites and Monuments Board of Canada recognised the St. Laurent Class as being historically significant to Canadians and in 2000 installed a bronze plaque aboard HMCS Fraser which reads:

St. Laurent Class of Canadian Warship

The pride of the Canadian Navy during the Cold War, these anti-submarine escorts were the first naval vessels conceived and built in Canada. Designed in 1948–1949, they influenced naval construction internationally with their smooth above-water surfaces and distinctive convex deck. They could also be sealed to protect crews against biological and radioactive threats. All seven St. Laurent-class ships were modified during the 1960s to carry helicopters and enhance their anti-submarine capability. Launched in 1953, the HMCS Fraser (sic) is the last surviving example of this innovative class of warship.

— National Historic Site plaque

The Government of Nova Scotia and the Town of Bridgewater were taken to court by the ARSNS over Fraser being assessed for commercial property taxes. ARSNS fought this litigation in the Supreme Court of Canada and then Appeals Court, arguing that vessels could not be assessed as commercial property. Although the society was legally successful in its argument, the court challenge caused significant financial hardship and resulted in the vessel's exterior paint deteriorating considerably in the absence of funding over this 12-year period. The vessel became an irritant to local residents whose waterfront properties faced the former warship and the "deplorable state" of the ship brought complaints from residents, municipal politicians, and naval veterans. The condition of Fraser became a local issue in the Nova Scotia's 2009 provincial election when signs appeared around Bridgewater criticising ARSNS chair Rick Welsford who was running as a Liberal candidate for the neglect of the ship.

=== Purchase by Government of Canada ===
After a year of negotiations and a proposal made to the Department of National Defence (DND) by the Artificial Reef Society of Nova Scotia, Minister of National Defence Peter MacKay announced in a press release on 30 January 2009 that DND had reached an agreement with the ARSNS to re-purchase the ship and transfer ownership of the warship back to the federal government. The release stated that ""DND may sink her to create an artificial reef, or scrap her, or move her to preserve her for heritage purposes."

At the time, DND indicated that it would purchase the vessel from ARSNS by 1 June 2009. Rick Welsford, chairman of the Society, as well as being the ship's strongest supporter and a constant target of criticism relating to the vessel's appearance, stated in February 2009 that the ship could still be restored for less than the cost of scrapping.

On the morning of 21 July 2009, two MARCOM tugboats from CFB Halifax entered the Lahave River. While a Canadian Forces officer exchanged a cheque in the amount of $1.00 from the Government of Canada to the Artificial Reef Society of Nova Scotia, receiving a ceremonial key to the vessel, the two tugboats took Fraser in tow and returned her to Halifax Harbour in approximately 12 hours. Fraser was secured in the Bedford Basin pending further discussions over her fate; she was subsequently moved to the Shearwater Jetty.

=== Scrapping ===
On 27 August 2010, DND announced that Fraser would be sold to the Marine Recycling Corporation and towed to MRC's facility in Port Colborne, Ontario for scrapping; historic artefacts had been removed from the ship by DND and placed at the Maritime Command Museum at CFB Halifax. Later that day, ARSNS filed a lawsuit against DND in the Federal Court of Canada citing breach of contract. A clause in the December 2008 agreement between DND and ARSNS had stated that should DND decide to scrap the ship, the society would receive "first consideration" to present a proposal to turn it into an artificial reef and that DND must find the proposal acceptable. ARSNS stated that its claim exceeded $50,000 not including interest and court costs. As a result of the lawsuit, the Federal Court of Canada ordered that the former HMCS Fraser be arrested at its berth at Jetty Lima at HMC Dockyard Annex in Dartmouth, Nova Scotia. DND was given 30 days to file its defence.

On 1 September 2010 the Federal Court of Canada quashed the arrest warrant, allowing DND to move the ship, however, the towing operation which was originally scheduled to begin on 2 September was interrupted by the passage of Hurricane Earl. On the morning of 7 September 2010 the former HMCS Fraser was taken under tow by the civilian tug Tony MacKay and departed Halifax Harbour. Fraser arrived at her destination in Port Maitland, Ontario on the afternoon of 19 September 2010. The scrapping process was completed in 2011.

HMCS Fraser undergoing scrapping process

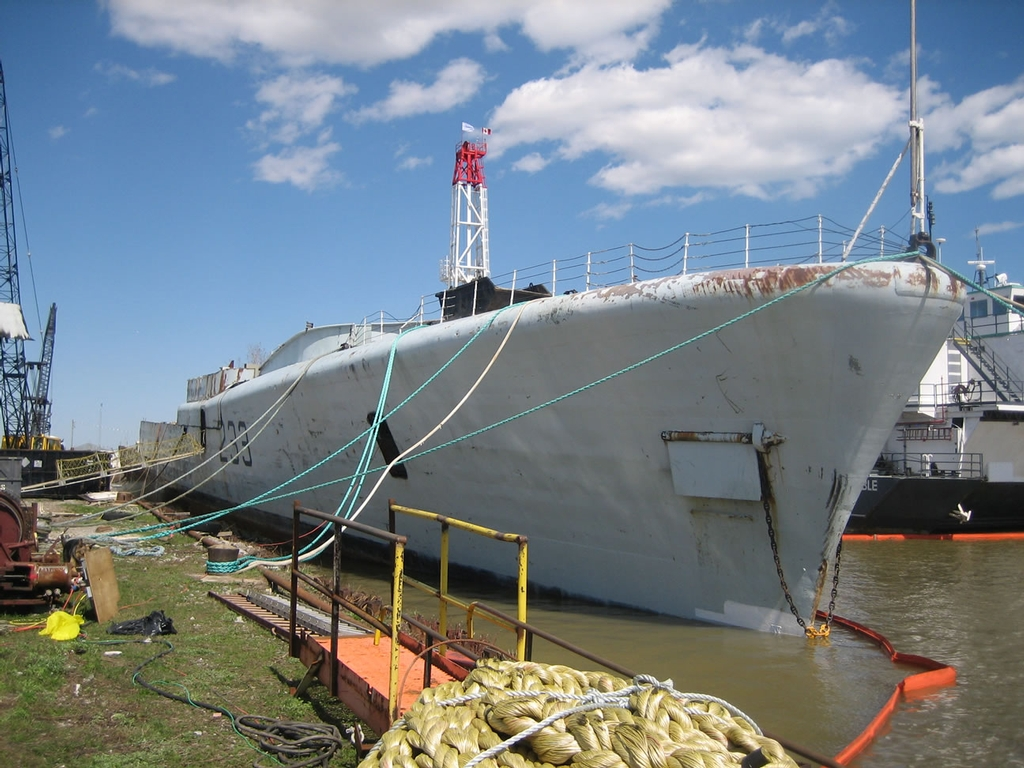

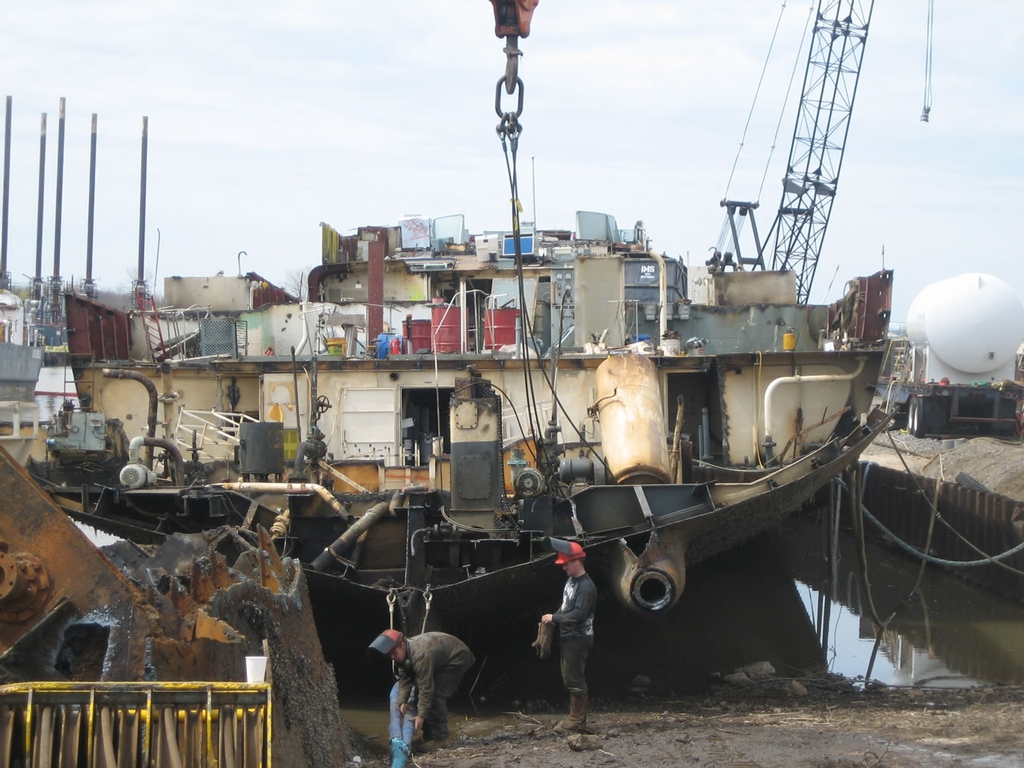

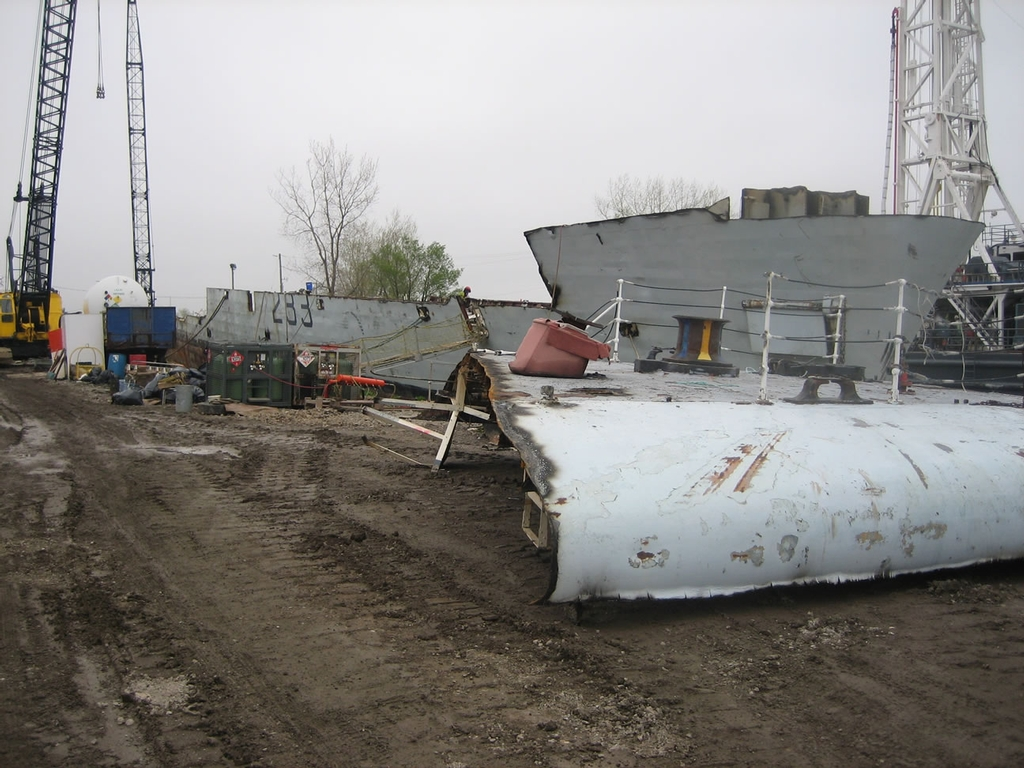

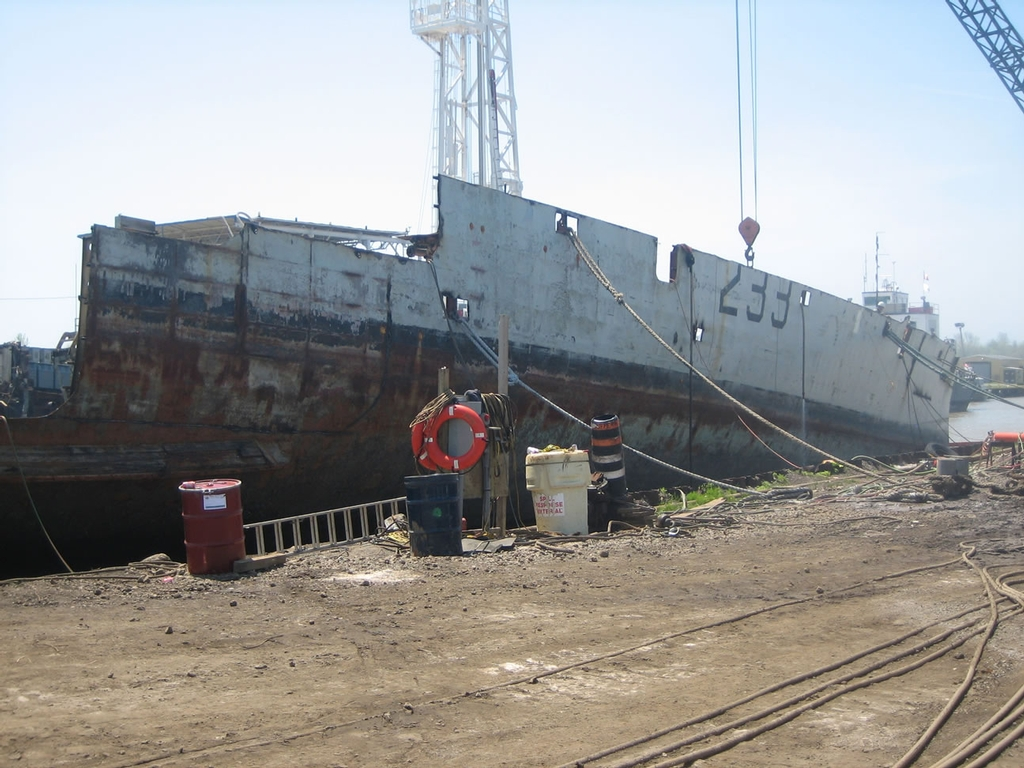

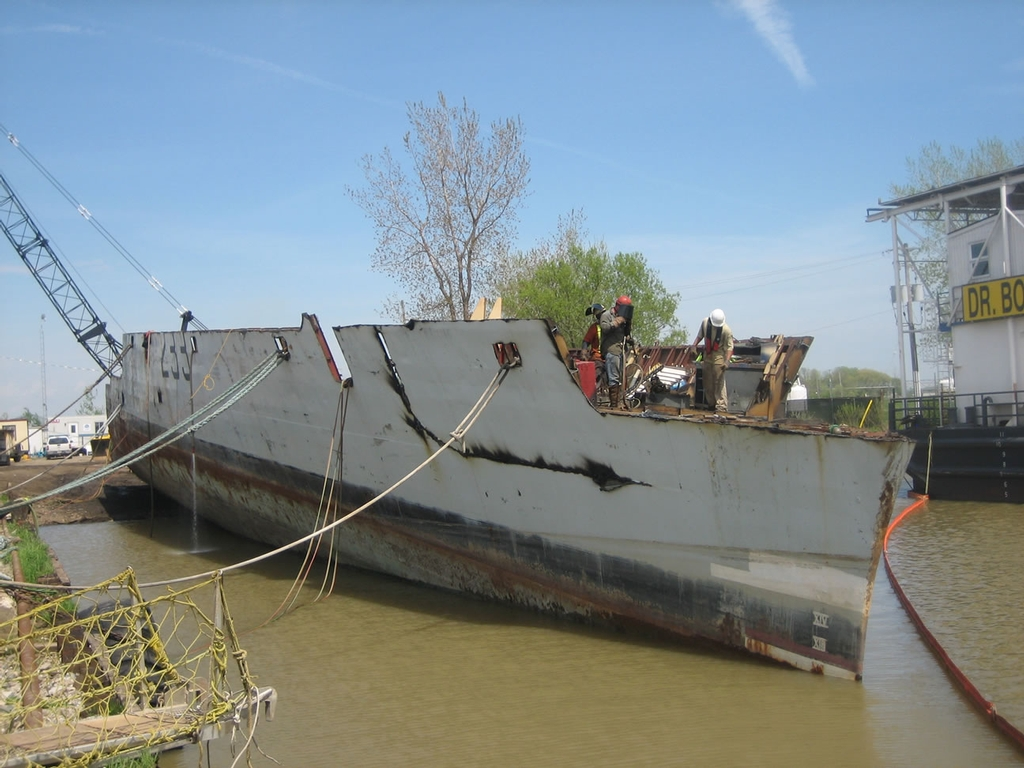

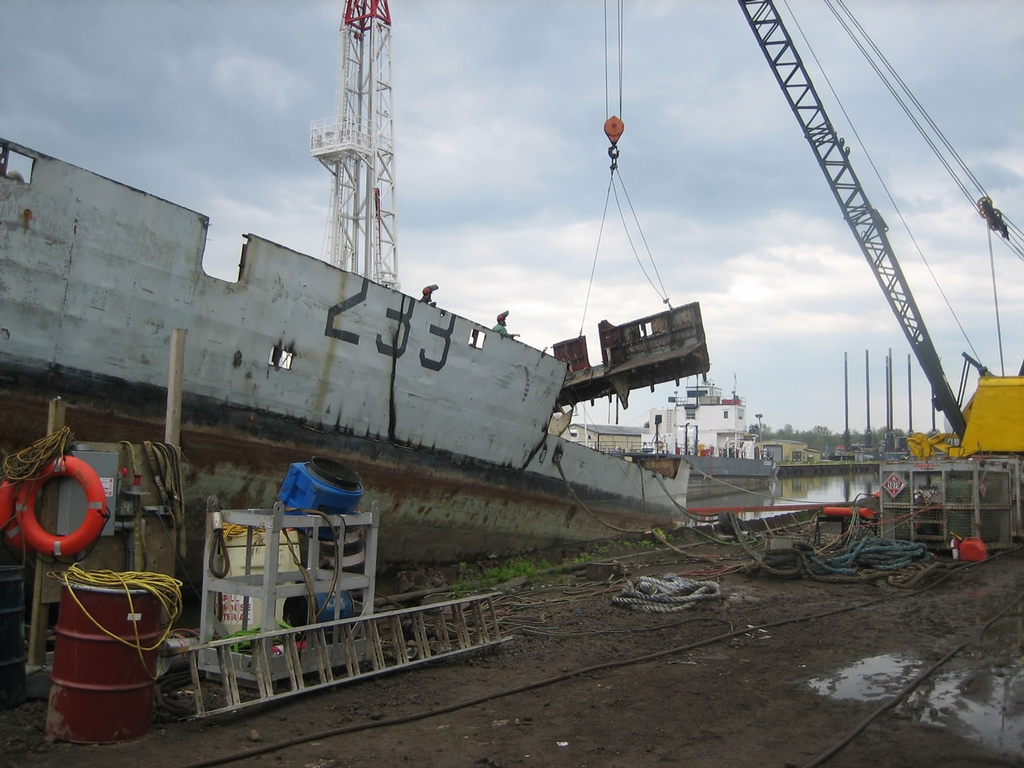
