= HMCS Margaree (DDH 230) =

Destroyer of the Royal Canadian Navy

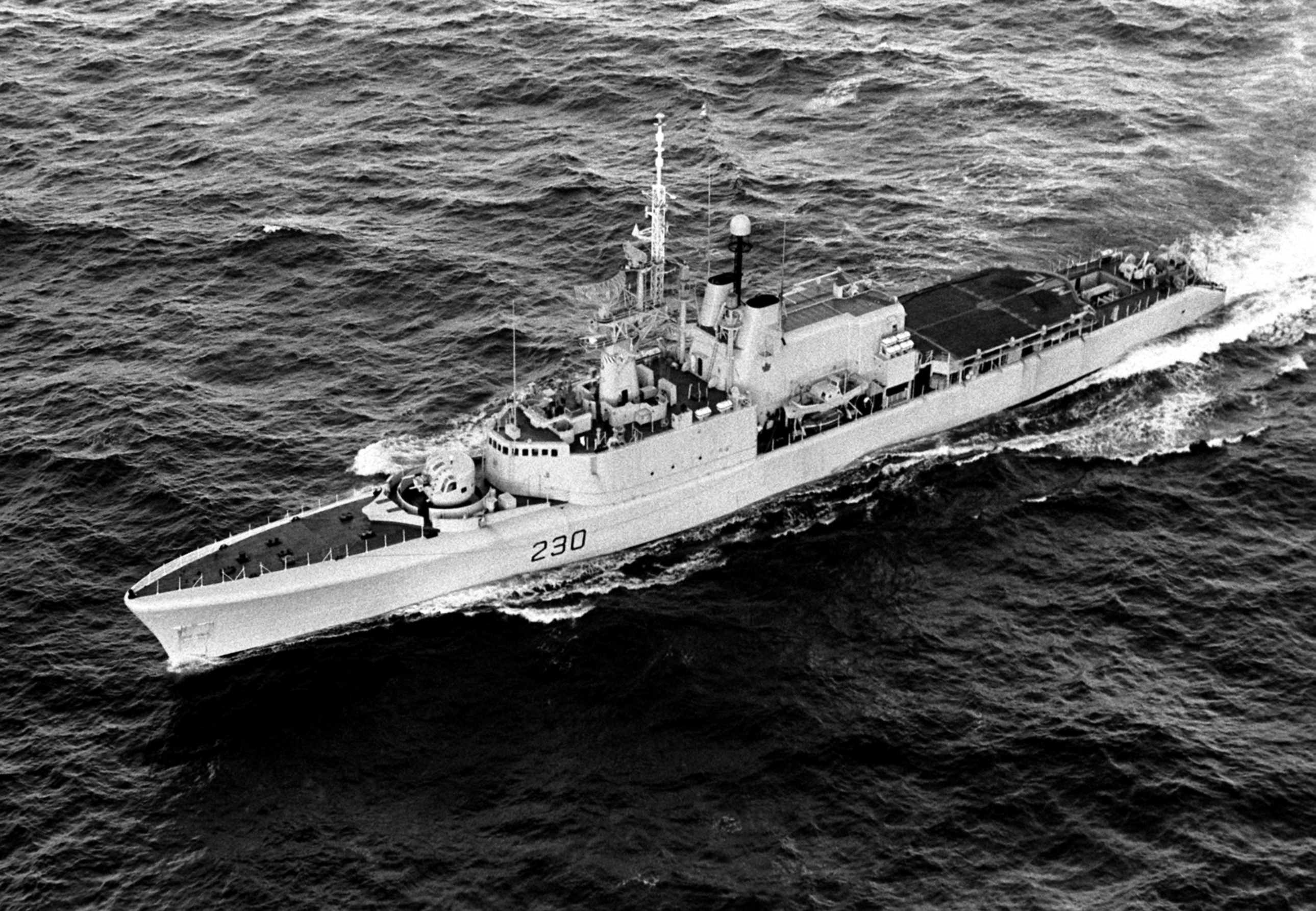
- HMCS Margaree 1990

History

Canada
- Name: Margaree
- Namesake: Margaree River
- Builder: Halifax Shipyards, Halifax, Nova Scotia
- Laid down: 12 September 1951
- Launched: 29 March 1956
- Commissioned: 5 October 1957
- Decommissioned: 2 May 1992
- Reclassified: 15 October 1965 (as DDH)
- Identification: Pennant number: 230
- Honours and awards: Atlantic 1940
- Fate: Scrapped in 1994.
- Badge: Azure, three cotises wavy argent, over all a flower of the Marguerite (daisy) proper.

General characteristics
- Type: St. Laurent-class destroyer escort
- Displacement: As DDE: 2263 tons (normal), 2800 tons (deep load); As DDH: 2260 tons (normal), 3051 tons (deep load)
- Length: 366 ft (111.6 m)
- Beam: 42 ft (12.8 m)
- Draught: As DDE: 13 ft (4.0 m); As DDH:14 ft (4.3 m)
- Propulsion: 2-shaft English-Electric geared steam turbines, 3 Babcock & Wilcox boilers 22,000 kW (30,000 shp)
- Speed: 28.5 knots (52.8 km/h)
- Range: 4,570 nautical miles (8,463.6 km) at 12 knots (22.2 km/h)
- Complement: As DDE: 249; As DDH: 213 plus 20 aircrew
- Sensors & processing systems: As DDE: 1 × SPS-12 air search radar; 1 × SPS-10B surface search radar; 1 × Sperry Mk.2 navigation radar; 1 × SQS-10 or −11 hull mounted active search and attack sonar; 1 × SQS-501 (Type 162) high frequency bottom profiling sonar; 1 × SQS-502 (Type 170) high frequency Limbo mortar control sonar; 1 × UQC-1B "Gertrude" underwater telephone; 1 × GUNAR (Mk.64 GFCS with 2 on-mount SPG-48 directors); As DDH: 1 × SPS-12 air search radar; 1 × SPS-10B surface search radar; 1 × Sperry Mk.2 navigation radar; 1 × URN 20 TACAN radar; 1 × SQS-10 or −11 hull mounted active search and attack sonar; 1 × SQS-501 (Type 162) high frequency bottom profiling sonar; 1 × SQS-502 (Type 170) high frequency Limbo mortar control sonar; 1 × SQS-504 VDS, medium frequency active search (except 233 after 1986); 1 × UQC-1B "Gertrude" underwater telephone; 1 × GUNAR (Mk.64 GFCS with 1 on-mount SPG-48 director)
- Electronic warfare & decoys: As DDE: 1 × DAU HF/DF (high frequency direction finder); As DDH: 1 × WLR 1C radar warning; 1 × UPD 501 radar detection; 1 × SRD 501 HF/DF
- Armament: As DDE: 2 × 3 in (76 mm) Mk.33 FMC twin mounts guns; 2 × 40 mm "Boffin" single mount guns; 2 × Mk NC 10 Limbo ASW mortars; 2 × single Mk.2 "K-gun" launchers with homing torpedoes; As DDH: 1 × 3"/50 Mk.33 FMC twin mount gun; 1 × Mk NC 10 Limbo ASW mortar; 2 × triple Mk.32 12.75 inch launchers firing Mk.44 or Mk.46 Mod 5 torpedoes
- Aircraft carried: As DDH: 1 × CH-124 Sea King
- Aviation facilities: As DDH: 1 × midships helicopter deck with Beartrap and hangar

HMCS Margaree was a St. Laurent-class destroyer that served in the Royal Canadian Navy and later the Canadian Forces from 1957–1992. She underwent conversion to a destroyer helicopter escort (DDH) in the mid-1960s and was officially reclassed with pennant DDH 230 on 15 October 1965. The vessel served until 1992 when it was discarded, sold for scrap and broken up in 1994.

== Design and description ==
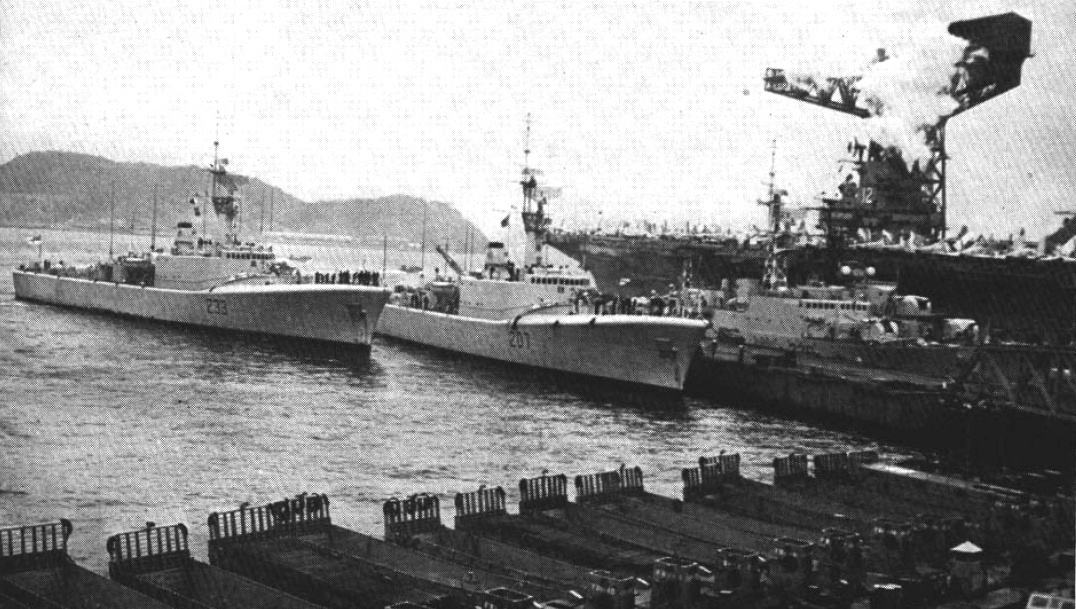
Two St. Laurent-class destroyers in their original configuration. Margaree is the first ship right of the dock

The need for the St. Laurent class came about in 1949 when Canada joined NATO and the Cold War was in its infancy. The Royal Canadian Navy (RCN) was assigned responsibility for anti-submarine warfare (ASW) and controlling sea space in the western North Atlantic. The St Laurent class were built to an operational requirement much like that which produced the British Type 12, and were powered by the same machinery plant. The rounded deck-edge forward was adopted to prevent ice forming. The vessels were designed to operate in harsh Canadian conditions. They were built to counter nuclear, biological and chemical attack conditions, which led to a design with a rounded hull, a continuous main deck, and the addition of a pre-wetting system to wash away contaminants. The living spaces on the ship were part of a "citadel" which could be sealed off from contamination for the crew safety. The ships were sometimes referred to as "Cadillacs" for their relatively luxurious crew compartments; these were also the first Canadian warships to have a bunk for every crew member since previous warship designs had used hammocks.

As built, the ships were 366 feet (112 m) long overall with a beam of 42 feet (13 m) and a draught of 13 feet 2 inches (4.01 m). The destroyer escorts displaced 2,263 tonnes (2,227 long tons) standard and 2,800 tonnes (2,800 long tons) at deep load. (Note: Conway's says 2000 tons standard displacement, 2600 deep load.) The destroyer escorts had a crew of 12 officers and 237 enlisted.

=== Armament ===
The St. Laurent class was fitted with twin 3-inch (76 mm)/L50 caliber guns in two mounts for engaging both surface and air targets. The ships were also fitted with two single-mounted 40 mm (1.6 in) guns. The class's anti-submarine armament consisted of a pair of triple-barreled Mk. NC 10 Limbo ASW mortars in a stern well. The stern well had a roller top to close it off from following seas. As with the British Type 12 design, the provision for long-range homing torpedoes (in this case BIDDER [Mk 20E] or the US Mark 35 were included. However, they were never fitted.

=== Machinery ===
The vessels of the St. Laurent class had two Babcock & Wilcox water tube boilers installed. The steam produced by these boilers was directed at two geared steam turbines which powered two shafts, providing 22,000 kilowatts (30,000 shp) to drive the ship at a maximum speed of 28.5 knots (52.8 km/h). The ships had an endurance of 4,570 nautical miles (8,460 km) at 12 knots (22 km/h).

=== DDH conversion ===
Following successful trials aboard the frigate Buckingham and sister ship Ottawa, plans to convert the St. Laurent class took shape. The development of the beartrap, installed in Assiniboine during her 1962–63 conversion, finalized the concept. By keeping the aircraft secure, the beartrap eliminated the need for deck handling from landing to the hangar, or from hangar to takeoff.

In the conversion to a helicopter-carrying vessel, Margaree was gutted except for machinery and some forward spaces. The hull was strengthened, and fuelling facilities for the helicopter and active fin stabilizers were installed. The fin stabilizers were to reduce roll in rough weather during helicopter operations. All seven St Laurents were fitted with helicopter platforms and SQS 504 Variable Depth Sonar (VDS). The single funnel was altered to twin stepped funnels to permit the forward extension of the helicopter hangar. To make room for the helicopter deck, the aft 3-inch mount and one of the Limbos were removed. The two 40 mm guns were also removed. Following the conversion, the displacement remained the same at standard load but at full load, it increased to 3,051 tonnes (3,003 long tons).

=== DELEX program ===
In the late 1970s, under the Destroyer Life Extension (DELEX) program was commissioned to upgrade ten of the St. Laurent-class ships with new electronics, machinery, and hull upgrades and repairs. However, only enough was done to keep the ships in service into the late 1980s. For the St. Laurents, this meant hull and machinery repairs only.

== Service history ==
Margaree was laid down on 12 September 1951 by Halifax Shipyards at Halifax, Nova Scotia and launched 29 March 1956. The ship was commissioned into the Royal Canadian Navy on 5 October 1957 at Halifax and initially carried the hull identification DDE 230 as a destroyer escort.

After commissioning, Margaree was sent to join the west coast fleet. She was assigned to the Second Canadian Escort Squadron. In January 1958, the destroyer escort departed Esquimalt, British Columbia for a training cruise around the Pacific, returning in April. In 1962, with Assiniboine and Ottawa, the ship took part in the large naval exercise JETEX 62 in the Pacific. On 25 September 1964 the ship began her conversion to a helicopter carrying destroyer (DDH) at Victoria Machinery Depot. The ship completed her refit on 15 October 1965 and transferred to the east coast. In 1968, the ship was a part of the Seventh Canadian Escort Squadron.

In January 1973, Assiniboine and auxiliary ship Protecteur were deployed to Standing Naval Force Atlantic (STANAVFORLANT), NATO's standing fleet. This was the first time two Canadian warships deployed together. In June 1973, Margaree collided with the fisheries research vessel Cygnus. In September 1976, Margaree took part in the major NATO naval exercise Teamwork 76. On 1 April 1979, Margaree sank the bow section of the commercial ship Kurdistan, which had broken in half on 15 March. The bow had been towed roughly 200 nautical miles (370 km) south of Halifax. The vessel was selected by the Canadian Forces for the Destroyer Life Extension (DELEX) program and completed this refit on 28 November 1980. The refit was begun by Vickers Ltd. at Montreal on 5 May 1980. However the hull was towed to HMC Dockyard at Halifax when it appeared that the ship would be ice-bound before completion.

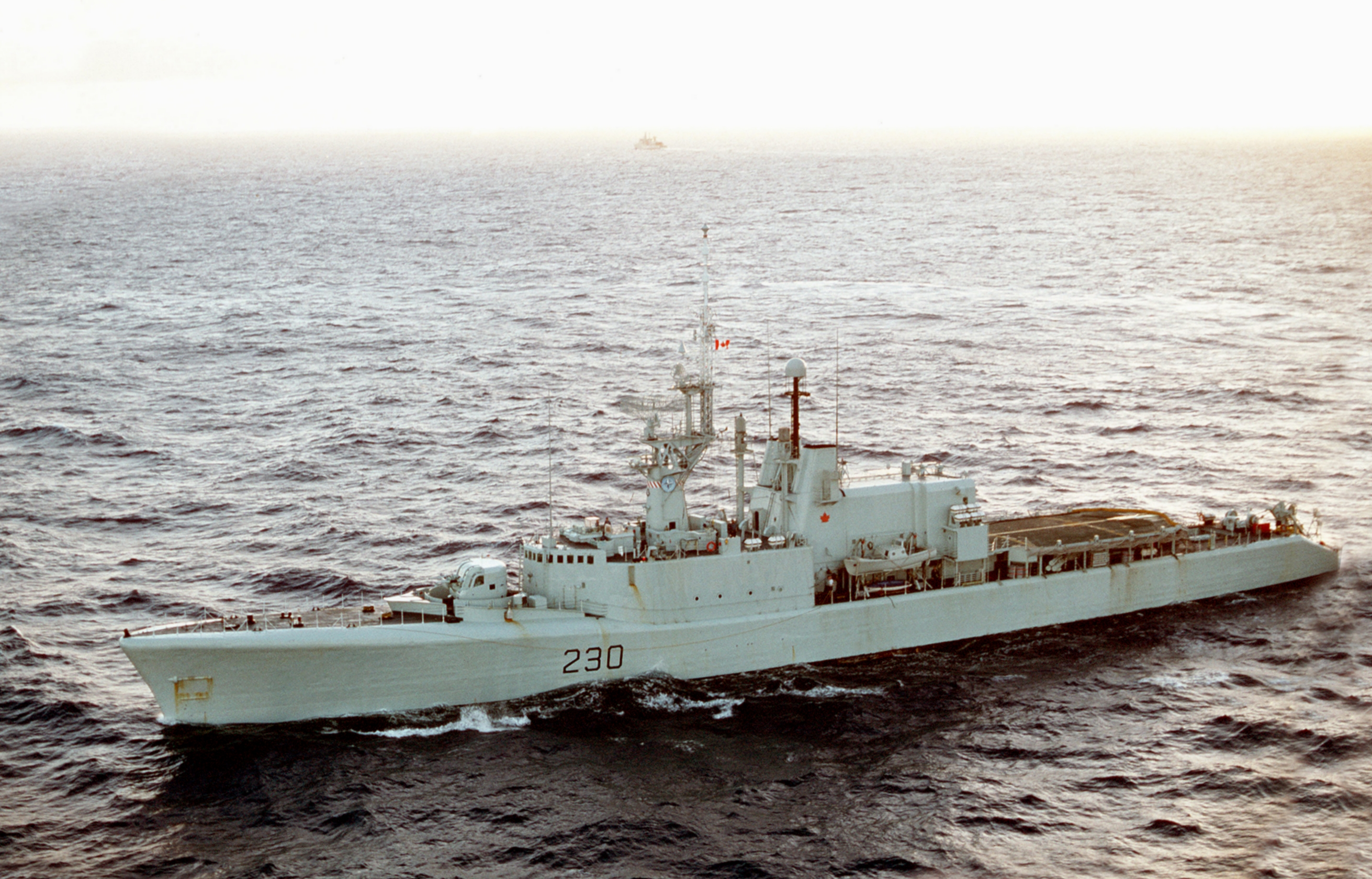
Margaree in 1990

In 1981, Margaree was pulled out of a major naval exercise due to cracks in their boiler heads. Following her DELEX refit, Margaree served several times with STANAVFORLANT. On 8 February 1991, two divers from Margaree drowned when conducting an inspection of the seawater intake pipes of the American frigate USS Pharris while in port at Funchal, Portugal, after becoming trapped. In August 1991, the ship took part in the re-enactment at Argentia of the signing of the Atlantic Charter, a pivotal policy of the Second World War.

Margaree was paid off from active service in the Canadian Forces on 2 May 1992. The vessel was sold to Global Shipping Company of Tampa, Florida on 3 February 1994. She was towed to India to be broken up in 1994.
