= HMCS Skeena (DDH 207) =

Destroyer of the Royal Canadian Navy

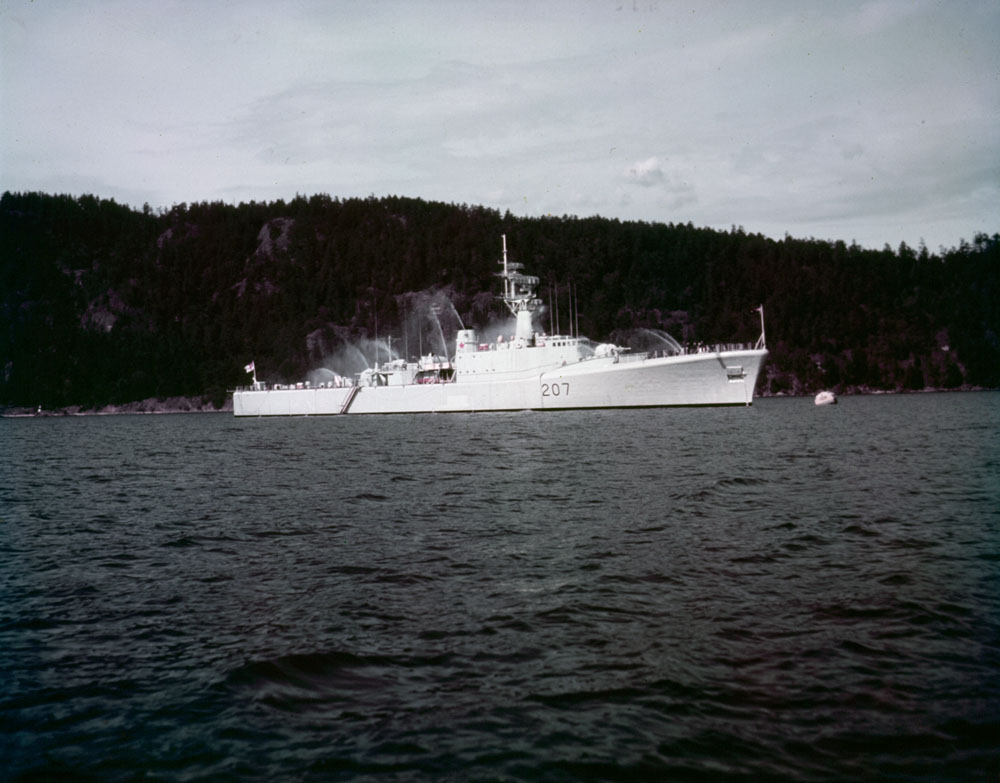
- HMCS Skeena (DDH 207) in 1957

History

Canada
- Name: Skeena
- Namesake: Skeena River
- Builder: Burrard Dry Dock, North Vancouver
- Laid down: 1 June 1951
- Launched: 19 August 1952
- Commissioned: 30 March 1957
- Decommissioned: 1 November 1993
- Reclassified: 14 August 1965 (as DDH)
- Home port: Halifax, Nova Scotia (as DDH)
- Identification: pennant number: 207; International Call Sign CGWP
- Motto: "En Avant"
- Honours and awards: Atlantic 1939–44, Normandy 1944, Biscay 1944
- Fate: Scrapped in 1996.
- Badge: Azure, out of a base invected argent, a salmon sinisterwise proper

General characteristics
- Type: St. Laurent-class destroyer escort
- Displacement: As DDE: 2263 tons (normal), 2800 tons (deep load); As DDH: 2260 tons (normal), 3051 tons (deep load)
- Length: 366 ft (111.6 m)
- Beam: 42 ft (12.8 m)
- Draught: As DDE: 13 ft (4.0 m); As DDH:14 ft (4.3 m)
- Propulsion: 2-shaft English-Electric geared steam turbines, 3 Babcock & Wilcox boilers 22,000 kW (30,000 shp)
- Speed: 28.5 knots (52.8 km/h)
- Range: 4,570 nautical miles (8,463.6 km) at 12 knots (22.2 km/h)
- Complement: As DDE: 249; As DDH: 213 plus 20 aircrew
- Sensors & processing systems: As DDE: 1 × SPS-12 air search radar; 1 × SPS-10B surface search radar; 1 × Sperry Mk.2 navigation radar; 1 × SQS-10 or −11 hull mounted active search and attack sonar; 1 × SQS-501 (Type 162) high frequency bottom profiling sonar; 1 × SQS-502 (Type 170) high frequency Limbo mortar control sonar; 1 × UQC-1B "Gertrude" underwater telephone; 1 × GUNAR (Mk.64 GFCS with 2 on-mount SPG-48 directors); As DDH: 1 × SPS-12 air search radar; 1 × SPS-10B surface search radar; 1 × Sperry Mk.2 navigation radar; 1 × URN 20 TACAN radar; 1 × SQS-10 or −11 hull mounted active search and attack sonar; 1 × SQS-501 (Type 162) high frequency bottom profiling sonar; 1 × SQS-502 (Type 170) high frequency Limbo mortar control sonar; 1 × SQS-504 VDS, medium frequency active search (except 233 after 1986); 1 × UQC-1B "Gertrude" underwater telephone; 1 × GUNAR (Mk.64 GFCS with 1 on-mount SPG-48 director)
- Electronic warfare & decoys: As DDE: 1 × DAU HF/DF (high frequency direction finder); As DDH: 1 × WLR 1C radar warning; 1 × UPD 501 radar detection; 1 × SRD 501 HF/DF
- Armament: As DDE: 2 × 3 in (76 mm) Mk.33 FMC twin mounts guns; 2 × 40 mm "Boffin" single mount guns; 2 × Mk NC 10 Limbo ASW mortars; 2 × single Mk.2 "K-gun" launchers with homing torpedoes; As DDH: 1 × 3"/50 Mk.33 FMC twin mount gun; 1 × Mk NC 10 Limbo ASW mortar; 2 × triple Mk.32 12.75 inch launchers firing Mk.44 or Mk.46 Mod 5 torpedoes
- Aircraft carried: As DDH: 1 × CH-124 Sea King
- Aviation facilities: As DDH: 1 × midships helicopter deck with Beartrap and hangar

HMCS Skeena was a St. Laurent-class destroyer that served in the Royal Canadian Navy and later the Canadian Forces from 1957 to 1993. Skeena was constructed as a destroyer escort and was converted in the 1960s to a helicopter-carrying destroyer. In 1972, the ship was designated a French Language Unit, the second in Canadian service. Discarded in 1994, the ship was broken up in India.

== Design and description ==
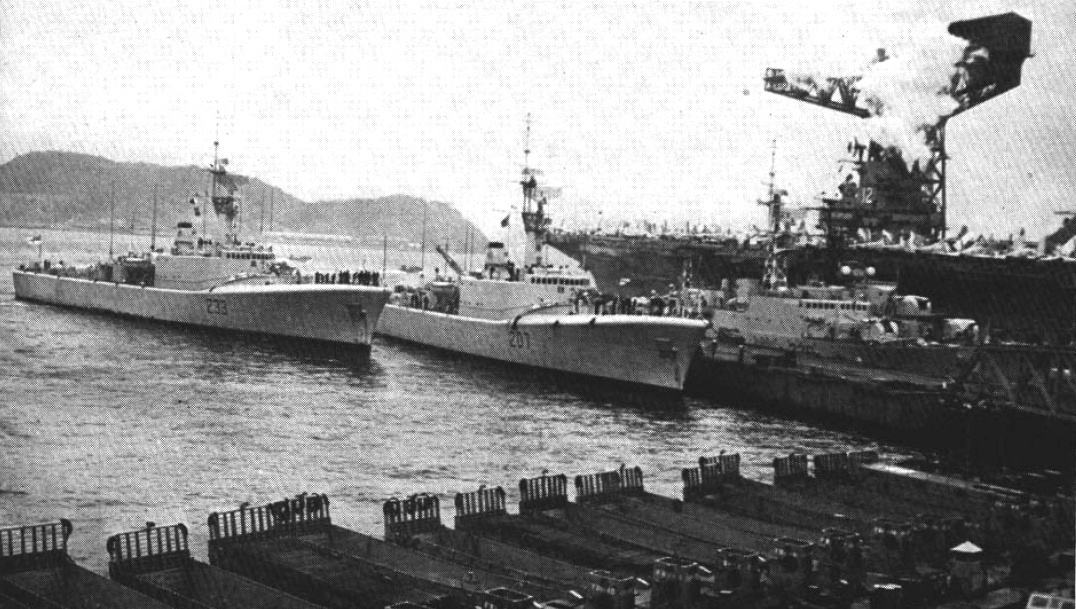
Two St. Laurent-class destroyers in their original configuration

The need for the St. Laurent class came about in 1949 when Canada joined NATO and the Cold War was in its infancy. The Royal Canadian Navy (RCN) was assigned responsibility for anti-submarine warfare (ASW) and controlling sea space in the western North Atlantic. The St Laurent class were built to an operational requirement much like that which produced the British Type 12, and were powered by the same machinery plant. The rounded deck-edge forward was adopted to prevent ice forming. The vessels were designed to operate in harsh Canadian conditions. They were built to counter nuclear, biological and chemical attack conditions, which led to a design with a rounded hull, a continuous main deck, and the addition of a pre-wetting system to wash away contaminants. The living spaces on the ship were part of a "citadel" which could be sealed off from contamination for the crew safety. The ships were sometimes referred to as "Cadillacs" for their relatively luxurious crew compartments; these were also the first Canadian warships to have a bunk for every crew member since previous warship designs had used hammocks.

As built, the ships were 366 feet (112 m) long overall with a beam of 42 feet (13 m) and a draught of 13 feet 2 inches (4.01 m). The destroyer escorts displaced 2,263 tonnes (2,227 long tons) standard and 2,800 tonnes (2,800 long tons) at deep load. (Note: Conway's says 2000 tons standard displacement, 2600 deep load.) The destroyer escorts had a crew of 12 officers and 237 enlisted.

=== Armament ===
The St. Laurent class was fitted with twin 3-inch (76 mm)/L50 caliber guns in two mounts for engaging both surface and air targets. The ships were also fitted with two single-mounted 40 mm (1.6 in) guns. The class's anti-submarine armament consisted of a pair of triple-barreled Mk. NC 10 Limbo ASW mortars in a stern well. The stern well had a roller top to close it off from following seas. As with the British Type 12 design, the provision for long-range homing torpedoes, in this case BIDDER [Mk 20E] or the US Mark 35 were included. However, they were never fitted.

=== Machinery ===
The vessels of the St. Laurent class had two Babcock & Wilcox water tube boilers installed. The steam produced by these boilers was directed at two geared steam turbines which powered two shafts, providing 22,000 kilowatts (30,000 shp) to drive the ship at a maximum speed of 28.5 knots (52.8 km/h). The ships had an endurance of 4,570 nautical miles (8,460 km) at 12 knots (22 km/h).

=== DDH conversion ===
Following successful trials aboard the frigate Buckingham and sister ship Ottawa, plans to convert the St. Laurent class took shape. The development of the beartrap, installed in Assiniboine during her 1962–63 conversion, finalized the concept. By keeping the aircraft secure, the beartrap eliminated the need for deck handling from landing to the hangar, or from hangar to takeoff.

In the conversion to a helicopter-carrying vessel, Skeena was gutted except for machinery and some forward spaces. The hull was strengthened, and fuelling facilities for the helicopter and active fin stabilizers were installed. The fin stabilizers were to reduce roll in rough weather during helicopter operations. All seven St Laurents were fitted with helicopter platforms and SQS 504 Variable Depth Sonar (VDS). The single funnel was altered to twin stepped funnels to permit the forward extension of the helicopter hangar. To make room for the helicopter deck, the aft 3-inch mount and one of the Limbos were removed. The two 40 mm guns were also removed. Following the conversion, the displacement remained the same at standard load but at full load, it increased to 3,051 tonnes (3,003 long tons).

=== DELEX program ===
In the late 1970s, under the Destroyer Life Extension (DELEX) program was commissioned to upgrade ten of the St. Laurent-class ships with new electronics, machinery, and hull upgrades and repairs. However, only enough was done to keep the ships in service into the late 1980s. For the St. Laurents, this meant hull and machinery repairs only.

== Service history ==
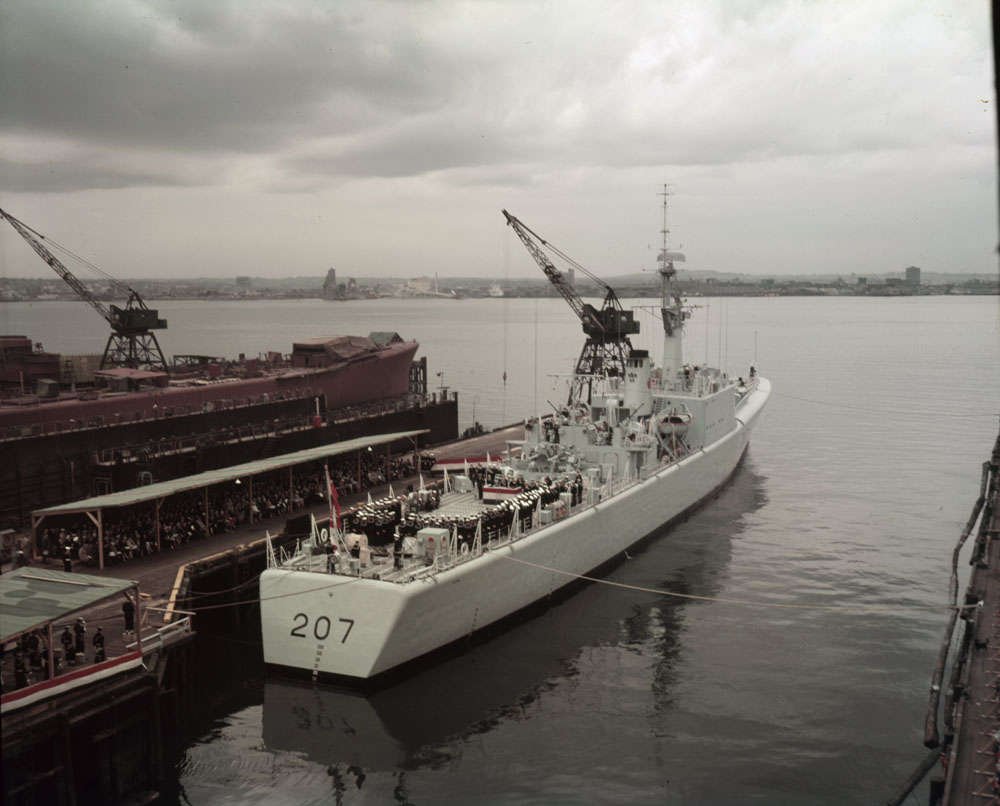
HMCS Skeena commissioning, 1957

Skeena was laid down by Burrard Yarrows at Vancouver on 1 June 1951. The vessel was launched on 19 August 1952 and commissioned into the Royal Canadian Navy on 30 March 1957, initially carrying the hull number DDE 207, as a destroyer escort.

After commissioning, Skeena was assigned to the Second Canadian Escort Squadron based out of Esquimalt, British Columbia. The Second Canadian Escort Squadron departed on a training cruise around the Pacific in January 1958, returning on 2 April. On 29 January 1962, Skeena accidentally shelled an American village in the Strait of Juan de Fuca. As one of four ships practicing their gunnery, some of the shrapnel from the ship's guns fell on Clallam Bay, Washington. The commander of the warship, Richard H. Leir, faced a court-martial for the event. He was later convicted.

Skeena underwent conversion to a destroyer helicopter escort (DDH) beginning in 1964 by Davie Shipbuilding at Lauzon, Quebec. The vessel exited the yard and was recommissioned as a DDH with the hull number DDH 207 on 14 August 1965. Following re-entry into service, the ship joined the Third Canadian Escort Squadron at Halifax, Nova Scotia.

In 1972, Skeena was designated a French Language Unit (FLU), replacing Ottawa. A French Language Unit was a Canadian Forces designation where French was to be the primarily spoken language to encourage career opportunities for Canadian Francophones. During the 1976 Summer Olympics which were held in Montreal, Quebec, the vessel was among those assigned to provide security.

Skeena was selected by the Canadian Forces for the Destroyer Life Extension (DELEX) program and completed this refit on 20 November 1981 at Montreal. However, the ship only began sea trials with the modifications on 4 January 1982. In May 1985, Skeena deployed as part of STANAVFORLANT, NATO's standing naval fleet. On 24–26 May, Skeena and USS Richard E. Byrd tracked a Soviet task force off the coast of Portugal. During the summer of 1991, the ship participated in the NATO naval exercise Ocean Safari 91. She also deployed with STANAVFORLANT from 09 Jan 1992 to 16 July 1992, sailing to the Caribbean then going to Europe until the end of her deployment. She was paid off from active service in the Canadian Forces on 1 November 1993. Skeena was sold in 1994 and broken up in India in 1996.
