= HMCS Fraser =

Two Canadian naval units have been named HMCS Fraser.

- HMCS Fraser (H48) was a C-class destroyer launched in 1932 as HMS Crescent and transferred to the Royal Canadian Navy in 1937. She was lost on 25 June 1940 in a collision with HMS Calcutta in the Gironde estuary.
- HMCS Fraser (DDH 233) was a St. Laurent-class destroyer of the Royal Canadian Navy and later the Canadian Forces, launched 19 February 1953. She was decommissioned in 1994 and scrapped in 2010–2011.
- HMCS Fraser is the lead ship of the planned River-class destroyer, intended to enter service in the 2030s.

== Battle honours ==
Ships of the Royal Canadian Navy that bear the name Fraser share the following the battle honours;

- Atlantic 1939–40
