= St. Laurent-class destroyer =

Destroyer escort class of the Royal Canadian Navy

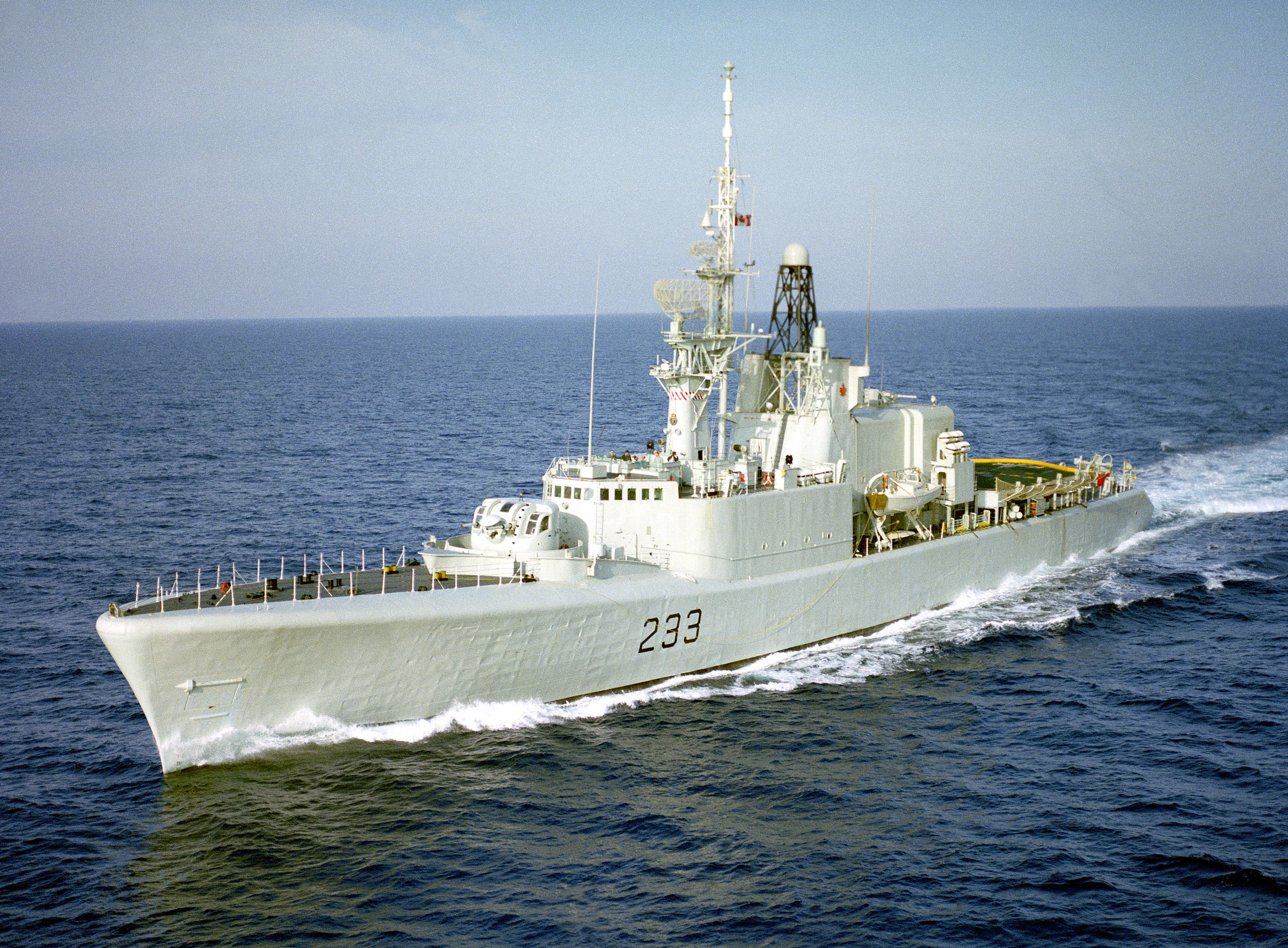
- HMCS Fraser in 1983

Class overview
- Name: St. Laurent class
- Builders: Canadian Vickers; Burrard Yarrows; Halifax Shipyards; Marine Industries
- Operators: Canadian Forces
- Preceded by: C class
- Succeeded by: Restigouche class
- In commission: 1955 – 1994
- Planned: 14
- Completed: 7
- Retired: 7

General characteristics
- Type: Destroyer escort
- Displacement: As DDE: 2263 tons (normal), 2800 tons (deep load); As DDH: 2260 tons (normal), 3051 tons (deep load)
- Length: 366 ft (111.6 m)
- Beam: 42 ft (12.8 m)
- Draught: As DDE: 13 ft (4.0 m); As DDH:14 ft (4.3 m)
- Propulsion: 2-shaft English-Electric geared steam turbines, 2 Babcock & Wilcox boilers 22,000 kW (30,000 shp)
- Speed: 28.5 knots (52.8 km/h)
- Range: 4,570 nautical miles (8,463.6 km) at 12 knots (22.2 km/h)
- Complement: As DDE: 249; As DDH: 213 plus 20 aircrew
- Sensors & processing systems: As DDE: 1 × SPS-12 air search radar; 1 × SPS-10B surface search radar; 1 × Sperry Mk.2 navigation radar; 1 × SQS-10 or −11 hull mounted active search and attack sonar; 1 × SQS-501 (Type 162) high frequency bottom profiling sonar; 1 × SQS-502 (Type 170) high frequency Limbo mortar control sonar; 1 × UQC-1B "Gertrude" underwater telephone; 1 × GUNAR (Mk.64 GFCS with 2 on-mount SPG-48 directors); As DDH: 1 × SPS-12 air search radar; 1 × SPS-10B surface search radar; 1 × Sperry Mk.2 navigation radar; 1 × URN 20 TACAN radar; 1 × SQS-10 or −11 hull mounted active search and attack sonar; 1 × SQS-501 (Type 162) high frequency bottom profiling sonar; 1 × SQS-502 (Type 170) high frequency Limbo mortar control sonar; 1 × SQS-504 VDS, medium frequency active search (except 233 after 1986); 1 × UQC-1B "Gertrude" underwater telephone; 1 × GUNAR (Mk.64 GFCS with 1 on-mount SPG-48 director)
- Electronic warfare & decoys: As DDE: 1 × DAU HF/DF (high frequency direction finder); As DDH: 1 × WLR 1C radar warning; 1 × UPD 501 radar detection; 1 × SRD 501 HF/DF
- Armament: As DDE: 2 × 3 in (76 mm) Mk.33 FMC twin mounts guns; 2 × 40 mm "Bofors" single mount guns; 2 × Mk NC 10 Limbo ASW mortars; 2 × single Mk.2 "K-gun" launchers with homing torpedoes; As DDH: 1 × 3 in/50 Mk.33 FMC twin mount gun; 1 × Mk NC 10 Limbo ASW mortar; 2 × triple Mk.32 12.75-inch launchers firing Mk.44 or Mk.46 Mod 5 torpedoes
- Aircraft carried: As DDH: 1 × CH-124 Sea King
- Aviation facilities: As DDH: 1 × midships helicopter deck with Beartrap and hangar

The St. Laurent-class destroyer was a class of destroyer escorts that served the Royal Canadian Navy and later the Canadian Forces from the mid-1950s to the mid-1990s.

This was the first major class of warship designed and built in Canada. They were analogous to the British Type 12 Whitby-class frigate, intended for the same ASW mission and using the same machinery but used a dramatically different hull form and predominantly American equipment rather than British. There were seven ships of the class commissioned between 1955 and 1957.

They were originally intended as destroyer escorts (DDE) but were later refitted and reclassed as destroyer helicopter escorts (DDH).

== Design and description ==
The need for the St. Laurent class came about in 1949 when Canada joined NATO and the Cold War was in its infancy. The Royal Canadian Navy (RCN) was assigned responsibility for anti-submarine warfare (ASW) and controlling sea space in the western North Atlantic.

Design work for a new class of destroyer escorts began in June 1949 with the original completion date slated for 1955. They were designed by Montreal naval architects German and Milne, under the direction of a senior constructor, Sir Rowland Baker, seconded from the British Director of Naval Construction. Baker produced a design basically similar to the Whitby-class (Type 12) frigate, while incorporating several ideas of his own. Different in appearance to the Type 12 design, the ship that resulted was similar in many respects.

The St Laurent class were built to an operational requirement much like that which produced the British Type 12, and were powered by the same machinery plant. The rounded deck-edge forward was adopted to prevent ice forming. The vessels were designed to operate in harsh Canadian conditions. They were built to counter nuclear, biological and chemical attack conditions, which led to a design with a rounded hull, a continuous main deck, and the addition of a pre-wetting system to wash away contaminants. The living spaces on the ship were part of a "citadel" which could be sealed off from contamination for the crew safety. The ships were sometimes referred to as "Cadillacs" for their relatively luxurious crew compartments; these were also the first Canadian warships to have a bunk for every crew member since previous warship designs had used hammocks.

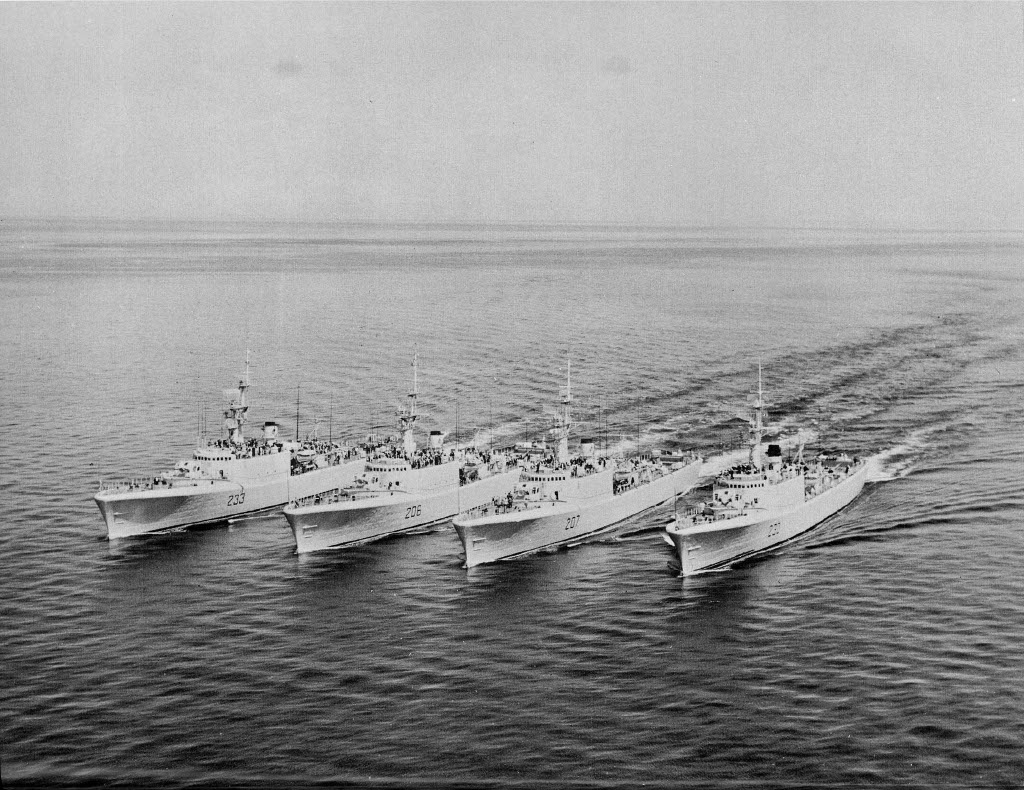
HMCS Fraser, Saguenay, Skeena, and Margaree c. 1963

Other innovative features not found on other ships of its time included an operations room separate from the bridge, from which the captain could command the ship while in combat, 12 separate internal telephone systems, air conditioning, and the latest advances in radar and sonar technology.

The St. Laurent class originally called for 14 vessels to be commissioned no later than 1955; however, changing design specifications due to the rapidly changing Cold War naval environment, as well as Canada's wartime priorities during the Korean War, saw only the first 7 completed by 1957. The remaining 7 vessels were built as the follow-on Restigouche class to incorporate advancements in naval warship design in the preceding years. There were also two essentially similar follow-on classes, the Mackenzie class (4 ships completed 1962–63) and the Annapolis class (2 ships, completed 1964), the latter completed as helicopter carrying destroyer escorts from the onset, and not converted later as were the seven St. Laurent-class ships.

As built, the ships were 366 feet (112 m) long overall with a beam of 42 feet (13 m) and a draught of 13 feet 2 inches (4.01 m). The destroyer escorts displaced 2,263 tonnes (2,227 long tons) standard and 2,800 tonnes (2,800 long tons) at deep load. (Note: Conway's says 2000 tons standard displacement, 2600 deep load.) The destroyer escorts had a crew of 12 officers and 237 enlisted.

=== Armament ===
The St. Laurent class was fitted with twin 3-inch (76 mm)/L50 calibre guns in two mounts for engaging both surface and air targets. The guns were capable of 85° elevation and could fire 50 rounds per minute up to 7.9 miles (12.7 km). The ships were also fitted with two single-mounted Bofors 40 mm gun|40 mm (1.6 in) guns. The class's anti-submarine armament consisted of a pair of triple-barreled Mk. NC 10 Limbo ASW mortars in a stern well. The stern well had a roller top to close it off from following seas. As with the British Type 12 design, the provision for long-range homing torpedoes (in this case BIDDER [Mk 20E] or the US Mark 35 were included. However, they were never fitted.

As built, the twin 3-inch anti-aircraft mounts were installed without shields. These were added in 1963. The gun housings are fibreglass. (Note: Jane's Fighting Ships 1963–64 shows photographs taken in 1962 and 1963 respectively of Skeena and Assiniboine with these.)

=== Machinery ===
The vessels of the St. Laurent class had two Babcock & Wilcox water tube boilers installed providing 600 psi (4,100 kPa), 42 (kgf/cm^{2}) at 850 °F (454.4 °C).

The steam produced by these boilers was directed at two geared steam turbines which powered two shafts, providing 22,000 kilowatts (30,000 shp) to drive the ship at a maximum speed of 28.5 knots (52.8 km/h). By the early 1990s, the quoted maximum speed was only 27 knots (50 km/h). The ships had an endurance of 4,570 nautical miles (8,460 km) at 12 knots (22 km/h).

The propelling machinery was of British design. Yarrow & Co Ltd, Scotstoun, Glasgow, received an order from Canadian Vickers for the supply of a complete set of machinery for St. Laurent, the other ships being supplied with machinery manufactured in Canada. The main turbines and machinery were of English Electric design.

=== DDH conversion ===
The advent of nuclear-powered attack submarines in the late 1950s prompted RCN leaders to assess the new threat they posed. Although these craft were noisier than older submarines and could therefore be detected at longer ranges, they were also capable of 30 knots (56 km/h) while submerged, which was faster than the top speed of the St. Laurents at 28.5 knots (52.8 km/h). Some RCN leaders harbored serious doubts that the destroyers could effectively pursue and destroy such fast vessels, even when operating in pairs. During a 25 February 1959 meeting of the Naval Board, it was decided that the Navy would counter the new threat by outfitting destroyers for helicopter operation.

The RCN had examined the feasibility of operating ASW helicopters from small escorts when it modified the Prestonian class HMCS Buckingham in mid-1956 with a temporary helicopter landing platform fitted the quarterdeck. Trials held in October 1956 using a Sikorsky HO4S-3 were successful, and a larger temporary helicopter landing platform was installed in the new destroyer escort HMCS Ottawa in August 1957. Operational trials were conducted using an RCAF Sikorsky S-58, a substantially larger and heavier aircraft than the HO4S, and the success of these tests led to approval of the concept.

To achieve the goal, the RCN needed a helicopter capable of all-weather day-and-night operations with a heavy weapons load—capabilities the HO4S lacked—and a means to handle and secure the aircraft on the landing platform in rough seas. Trials showed landing was not the major concern: deck handling was. Manpower alone was insufficiently quick or certain in all conditions. During the 1957 trials aboard Ottawa, it had taken 30 tense minutes to secure the S-58 to the deck during nighttime operations in rough seas. The deck handling issue was addressed by the invention of the beartrap. The Navy came up with the solution, and contracted Fairey Aviation of Dartmouth, Nova Scotia, to produce it. Fairey's prototype was installed in Assiniboine during her 1962–63 conversion. By keeping the aircraft secure, the beartrap eliminated the need for deck handling from landing to the hangar, or from hangar to takeoff.

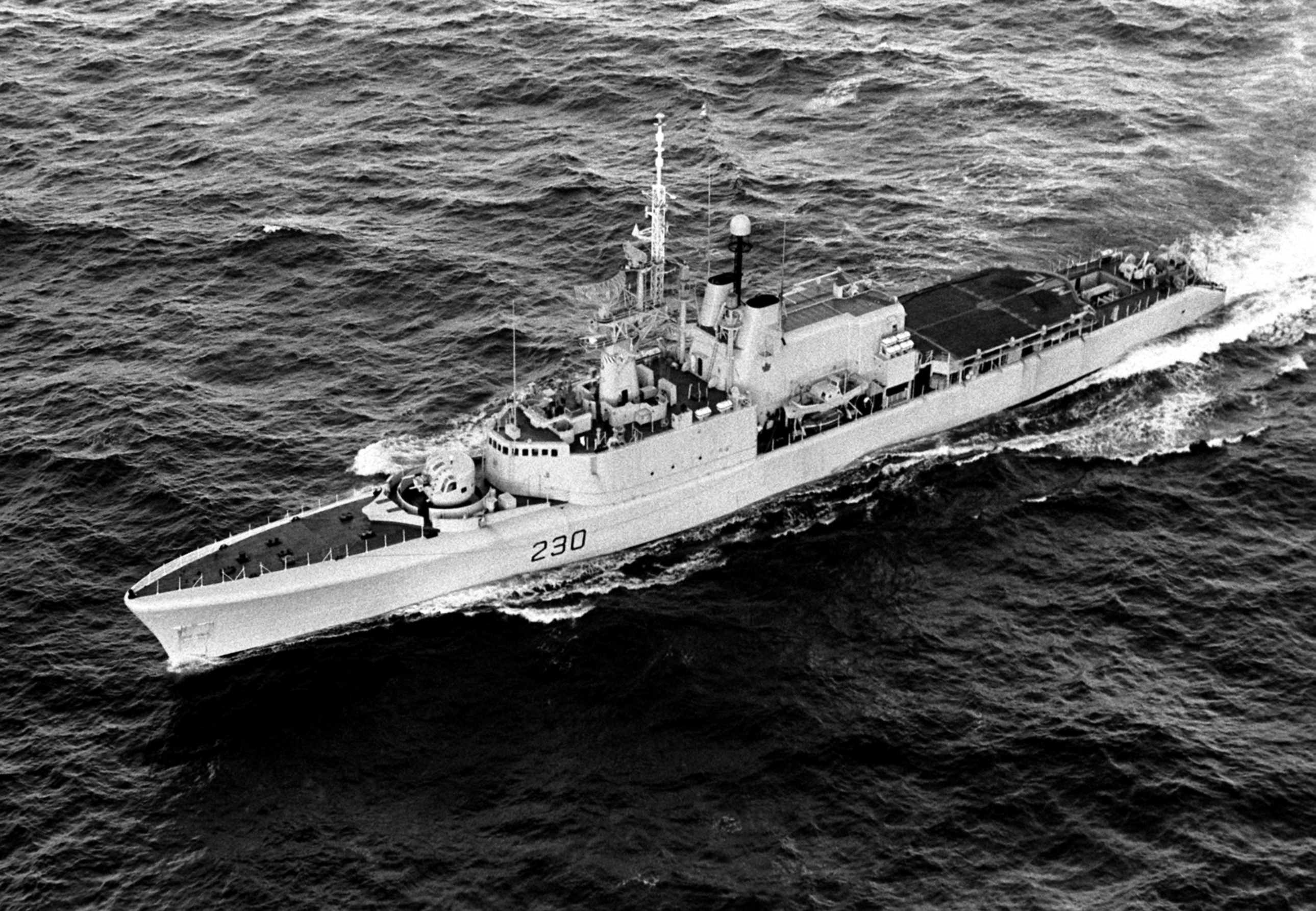
Margaree with helicopter platform added

In the conversion to a helicopter-carrying vessel, Assiniboine was gutted except for machinery and some forward spaces. The hull was strengthened, fuelling facilities for the helicopter and activated fin stabilizers installed. The fin stabilizers were to reduce roll in rough weather during helicopter operations. All seven St Laurents were fitted with helicopter platforms and SQS 504 Variable Depth Sonar (VDS). St Laurent was equipped with VDS late in 1961, the helicopter platform to be added later. When ships were fitted with the helicopter platform, the single funnel was altered to twin stepped funnels to permit the forward extension of the helicopter hangar. To make room for the helicopter deck, the aft 3-inch mount and one of the Limbos were removed. The two 40 mm guns were also removed. Following the conversion, the displacement remained the same at standard load but at full load, it increased to 3,051 tonnes (3,003 long tons).

Initial studies identified two helicopters that met the upcoming requirements- the Sikorsky S-61 (HSS-2) Sea King and the Kaman K-20 (HU2K). The Sea King was ultimately chosen in December 1961.

Assiniboine was the first in the class to receive the full upgrade, re-commissioning as a DDH on 28 June 1963. On 27 November 1963, her new platform was used for the first operational landing of a production CHSS-2 Sea King, and her beartrap landing system was used operationally for the first time a week later.

=== DELEX program ===
In the late 1970s, under the Destroyer Life Extension (DELEX) program was commissioned to upgrade seven of the St. Laurent-class ships with new electronics, machinery, and hull upgrades and repairs. However, only enough was done to keep the ships in service into the late 1980s. For the St. Laurents, this meant hull and machinery repairs only.

== Ships ==
Note that the pennant numbers were originally prefixed with the classification symbol DDE but were changed to DDH in the early 1960s.

St. Laurent class construction data
| Ship | Pennant number | Builder | Laid down | Launched | Commissioned | Refits completed | | Paid off | Fate |
| Ship | Pennant number | Builder | Laid down | Launched | Commissioned | DDH | DELEX | Paid off | Fate |
|---|---|---|---|---|---|---|---|---|---|
| St. Laurent | DDE 205 | Canadian Vickers Ltd., Montreal, Quebec | 24 November 1950 | 30 November 1951 | 29 October 1955 | 4 October 1963 | Never | 14 June 1974 | Discarded 1979. Foundered and sank off Cape Hatteras on 12 January 1980 |
| Saguenay | DDE 206 | Halifax Shipyards Ltd., Halifax, Nova Scotia | 4 April 1951 | 30 July 1953 | 15 December 1956 | 14 May 1965 | 23 May 1980 | 26 June 1990 | Scuttled as an artificial reef off Lunenburg, Nova Scotia |
| Skeena | DDE 207 | Burrard Dry Dock Ltd., North Vancouver, British Columbia | 1 June 1951 | 19 August 1952 | 30 March 1957 | 14 August 1965 | 20 November 1981 | 1 November 1993 | Sold for scrap 1996 |
| Ottawa | DDE 229 | Canadian Vickers Ltd., Montreal, Quebec | 8 June 1951 | 29 April 1953 | 10 November 1956 | 28 October 1964 | 26 November 1982 | 31 July 1992 | Scrapped 1994 |
| Margaree | DDE 230 | Halifax Shipyards Ltd., Halifax, Nova Scotia | 12 September 1951 | 29 March 1956 | 5 October 1957 | 15 October 1965 | 28 November 1980 | 2 May 1992 | Scrapped 1994 |
| Fraser | DDE 233 | Burrard Dry Dock Ltd., North Vancouver, British Columbia | 11 December 1951 | 19 February 1953 | 28 June 1957 | 22 October 1966 | 28 May 1982 | 5 October 1994 | Scrapped 2011 |
| Assiniboine | DDE 234 | Marine Industries Ltd., Sorel, Quebec | 19 May 1952 | 12 February 1954 | 16 August 1956 | 28 June 1963 | 16 November 1979 | 14 December 1988 | Scrapped 1995 |

== Service history ==
=== Pre-conversion ===
All seven ships were laid down between November 1950 and May 1952. All seven ships were completed by October 1957. Assiniboine joined the RCN at Halifax, Nova Scotia following her commissioning and spent the next two years on the east coast. In 1959, the ship transferred to the west coast and served there until being taken out of service in 1962 for conversion to a helicopter-carrying destroyer, the first of the class to go through the process. Fraser after commissioning in 1957 spent the first six years of her career on the west coast. During this period she aided the yacht Redwitch in 1960 and Yaqui Queen in 1964. In 1965, Fraser was subjected to shock tests off Hawaii to test the survival capabilities of the class. The destroyer escort then sailed to the Vickers shipyard in Montreal to undergo conversion to a DDH. Following her commissioning, Margaree was assigned to the west coast. She made port visits and participated in several naval exercises before undergoing her conversion to a DDH at Victoria Machinery Depot, Victoria, British Columbia.

== Significance ==
In 1997, the Historic Sites and Monuments Board of Canada recognized the St. Laurent class as being historically significant to Canadians and in 2000 installed a bronze plaque aboard Fraser which read:

St. Laurent Class of Canadian Warship

The pride of the Canadian Navy during the Cold War, these anti-submarine escorts were the first naval vessels conceived and built in Canada. Designed in 1948–1949, they influenced naval construction internationally with their smooth above-water surfaces and distinctive convex deck. They could also be sealed to protect crews against biological and radioactive threats. All seven St. Laurent-class ships were modified during the 1960s to carry helicopters and enhance their anti-submarine capability. Launched in 1953, HMCS Fraser is the last surviving example of this innovative class of warship.

— National Historic Site plaque
