= HMCS Ottawa (DDH 229) =

Destroyer of the Royal Canadian Navy

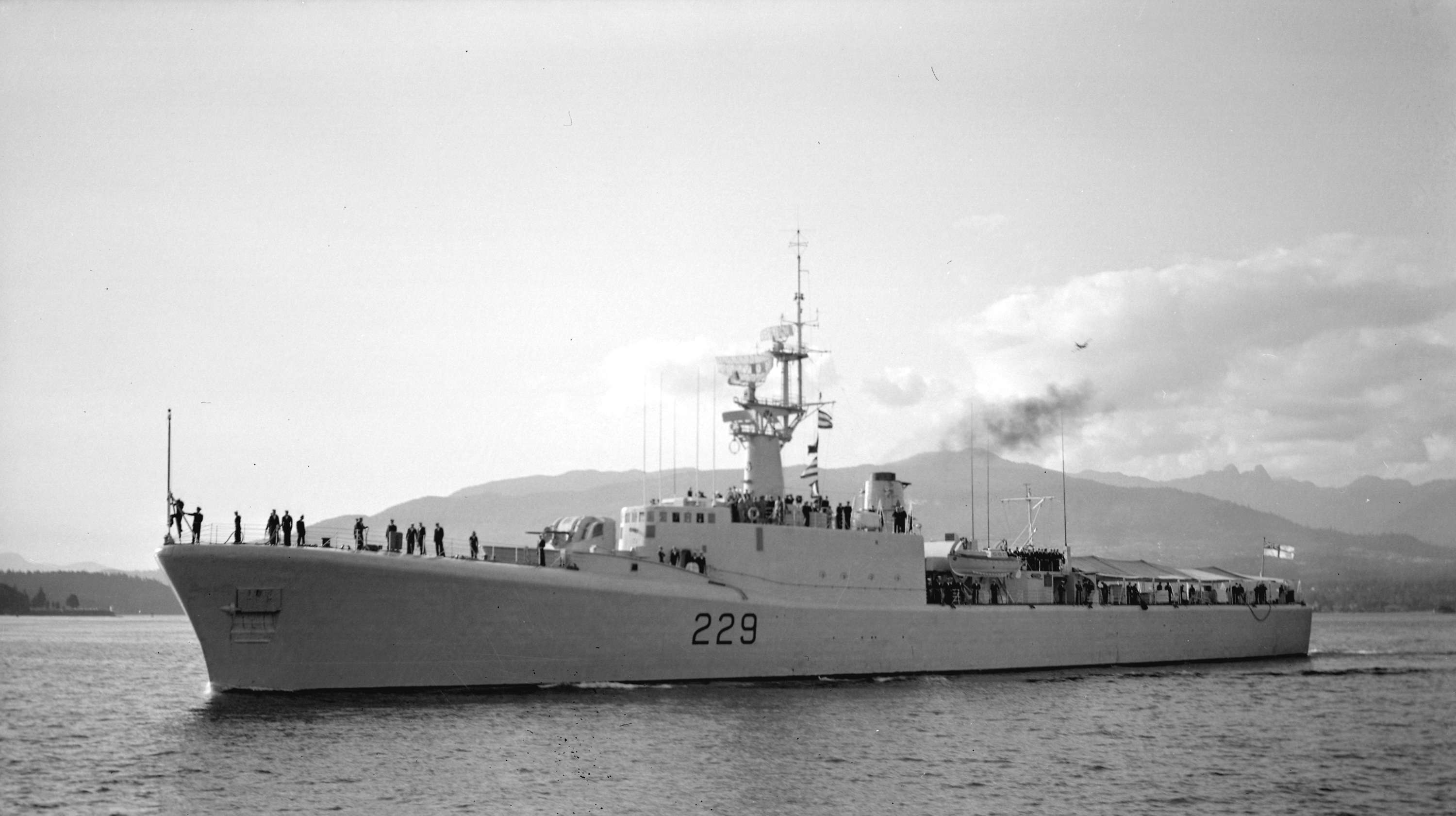
- Ottawa in August 1960

History

Canada
- Name: Ottawa
- Namesake: Ottawa River
- Builder: Canadian Vickers, Montreal
- Laid down: 8 June 1951
- Launched: 29 April 1953
- Commissioned: 10 November 1956
- Decommissioned: 31 July 1992
- Reclassified: 21 October 1964 (as DDH)
- Identification: DDH 229
- Honours and awards: Atlantic 1939–45, Normandy 1944, English Channel 1944, Biscay 1944
- Fate: Scrapped in 1994.
- Badge: Gules, a bend wavy argent charged with two cotises wavy azure over all a beaver or, the sinister forepaw resting on a log of silver birch proper.

General characteristics
- Type: Destroyer escort
- Displacement: As DDE: 2263 tons (normal), 2800 tons (deep load); As DDH: 2260 tons (normal), 3051 tons (deep load)
- Length: 366 ft (111.6 m)
- Beam: 42 ft (12.8 m)
- Draught: As DDE: 13 ft (4.0 m); As DDH:14 ft (4.3 m)
- Propulsion: 2-shaft English-Electric geared steam turbines, 3 Babcock & Wilcox boilers 22,000 kW (30,000 shp)
- Speed: 28.5 knots (52.8 km/h)
- Range: 4,570 nautical miles (8,463.6 km) at 12 knots (22.2 km/h)
- Complement: As DDE: 249; As DDH: 213 plus 20 aircrew
- Sensors & processing systems: As DDE: 1 × SPS-12 air search radar; 1 × SPS-10B surface search radar; 1 × Sperry Mk.2 navigation radar; 1 × SQS-10 or −11 hull mounted active search and attack sonar; 1 × SQS-501 (Type 162) high frequency bottom profiling sonar; 1 × SQS-502 (Type 170) high frequency Limbo mortar control sonar; 1 × UQC-1B "Gertrude" underwater telephone; 1 × GUNAR (Mk.64 GFCS with 2 on-mount SPG-48 directors); As DDH: 1 × SPS-12 air search radar; 1 × SPS-10B surface search radar; 1 × Sperry Mk.2 navigation radar; 1 × URN 20 TACAN radar; 1 × SQS-10 or −11 hull mounted active search and attack sonar; 1 × SQS-501 (Type 162) high frequency bottom profiling sonar; 1 × SQS-502 (Type 170) high frequency Limbo mortar control sonar; 1 × SQS-504 VDS, medium frequency active search (except 233 after 1986); 1 × UQC-1B "Gertrude" underwater telephone; 1 × GUNAR (Mk.64 GFCS with 1 on-mount SPG-48 director)
- Electronic warfare & decoys: As DDE: 1 × DAU HF/DF (high frequency direction finder); As DDH: 1 × WLR 1C radar warning; 1 × UPD 501 radar detection; 1 × SRD 501 HF/DF
- Armament: As DDE: 2 × 3 in (76 mm) Mk.33 FMC twin mounts guns; 2 × 40 mm "Boffin" single mount guns; 2 × Mk NC 10 Limbo ASW mortars; 2 × single Mk.2 "K-gun" launchers with homing torpedoes; As DDH: 1 × 3"/50 Mk.33 FMC twin mount gun; 1 × Mk NC 10 Limbo ASW mortar; 2 × triple Mk.32 12.75 inch launchers firing Mk.44 or Mk.46 Mod 5 torpedoes
- Aircraft carried: As DDH: 1 × CH-124 Sea King
- Aviation facilities: As DDH: 1 × midships helicopter deck with Beartrap and hangar

HMCS Ottawa (DDH 229) was a St. Laurent-class destroyer that served in the Royal Canadian Navy and later the Canadian Forces from 1956 to 1992. Ottawa was the first ship with a bilingual crew in the Canadian navy.

== Design and description ==
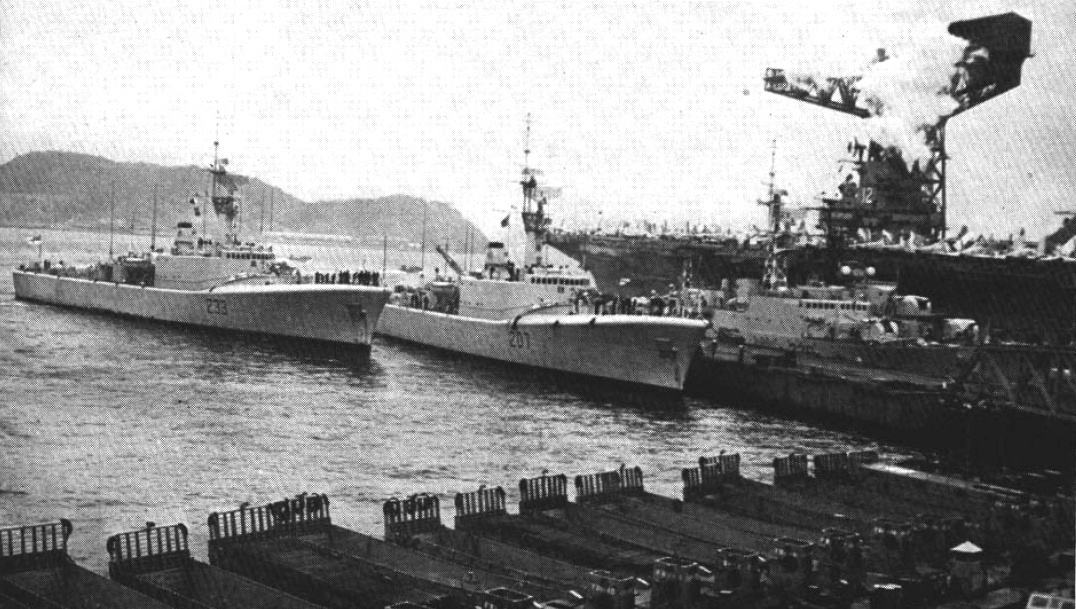
Two St. Laurent-class destroyers in their original configuration

The need for the St. Laurent class came about in 1949 when Canada joined NATO and the Cold War was in its infancy. The Royal Canadian Navy (RCN) was assigned responsibility for anti-submarine warfare (ASW) and controlling sea space in the western North Atlantic. The St Laurent class were built to an operational requirement much like that which produced the British Type 12, and were powered by the same machinery plant. The rounded deck-edge forward was adopted to prevent ice forming. The vessels were designed to operate in harsh Canadian conditions. They were built to counter nuclear, biological and chemical attack conditions, which led to a design with a rounded hull, a continuous main deck, and the addition of a pre-wetting system to wash away contaminants. The living spaces on the ship were part of a "citadel" which could be sealed off from contamination for the crew safety. The ships were sometimes referred to as "Cadillacs" for their relatively luxurious crew compartments; these were also the first Canadian warships to have a bunk for every crew member since previous warship designs had used hammocks.

As built, the ships were 366 feet (112 m) long overall with a beam of 42 feet (13 m) and a draught of 13 feet 2 inches (4.01 m). The destroyer escorts displaced 2,263 tonnes (2,227 long tons) standard and 2,800 tonnes (2,800 long tons) at deep load. (Note: Conway's says 2000 tons standard displacement, 2600 deep load.) The destroyer escorts had a crew of 12 officers and 237 enlisted.

=== Armament ===
The St. Laurent class was fitted with twin 3-inch (76 mm)/L50 caliber guns in two mounts for engaging both surface and air targets. The ships were also fitted with two single-mounted 40 mm (1.6 in) guns. The class's anti-submarine armament consisted of a pair of triple-barreled Mk. NC 10 Limbo ASW mortars in a stern well. The stern well had a roller top to close it off from following seas. As with the British Type 12 design, the provision for long-range homing torpedoes (in this case BIDDER [Mk 20E] or the US Mark 35 were included. However, they were never fitted.

=== Machinery ===
The vessels of the St. Laurent class had two Babcock & Wilcox water tube boilers installed. The steam produced by these boilers was directed at two geared steam turbines which powered two shafts, providing 22,000 kilowatts (30,000 shp) to drive the ship at a maximum speed of 28.5 knots (52.8 km/h). The ships had an endurance of 4,570 nautical miles (8,460 km) at 12 knots (22 km/h).

=== DDH conversion ===
Following successful trials aboard the frigate Buckingham and Ottawa, plans to convert the St. Laurent class took shape. The development of the beartrap, installed in Assiniboine during her 1962–63 conversion, finalized the concept. By keeping the aircraft secure, the beartrap eliminated the need for deck handling from landing to the hangar, or from hangar to takeoff.

In the conversion to a helicopter-carrying vessel, Ottawa was gutted except for machinery and some forward spaces. The hull was strengthened, and fuelling facilities for the helicopter and active fin stabilizers were installed. The fin stabilizers were to reduce roll in rough weather during helicopter operations. All seven St Laurents were fitted with helicopter platforms and SQS 504 Variable Depth Sonar (VDS). The single funnel was altered to twin stepped funnels to permit the forward extension of the helicopter hangar. To make room for the helicopter deck, the aft 3-inch mount and one of the Limbos were removed. The two 40 mm guns were also removed. Following the conversion, the displacement remained the same at standard load but at full load, it increased to 3,051 tonnes (3,003 long tons).

=== DELEX program ===
In the late 1970s, under the Destroyer Life Extension (DELEX) program was commissioned to upgrade ten of the St. Laurent-class ships with new electronics, machinery, and hull upgrades and repairs. However, only enough was done to keep the ships in service into the late 1980s. For the St. Laurents, this meant hull and machinery repairs only.

== Construction and career ==
Ottawa was laid down at Canadian Vickers in Montreal on 8 June 1951, the ship was launched on 29 May 1953. She was commissioned into the RCN on 10 November 1956 and initially carried the hull number DDE 229 as a destroyer escort. In 1957, Ottawa was used as a test ship for helicopter landing trials on a flight deck installed over the rear of the ship.

Ottawa was transferred to the west coast where she joined the Second Canadian Escort Squadron. In February 1960, she sailed with sister ships St. Laurent and Saguenay on an operational cruise to Hong Kong and Japan, performing training exercises with the Japanese Maritime Self-Defense Force. In March 1961, the same three ships deployed with the United States Navy's Carrier Division 17 off the coast of Hawaii. Ottawa underwent conversion to a destroyer helicopter escort (DDH) at Victoria, British Columbia, performed by Victoria Machinery Depot beginning on 24 May 1963. The ship was officially reclassed with pennant DDH 229 on 21 October 1964. Ottawa recommissioned on 28 October 1964 and re-transferred to the east coast.

On 15 July 1968 she became the first bilingual ship of Maritime Command. Designated a French Language Unit (FLU), this was to provide a primarily French-speaking unit in the navy, comparable to the Royal 22nd Regiment of the Canadian Army. Ottawa remained a FLU until 1 April 1973. The ship was replaced by Skeena as the naval FLU. In 1976, Ottawa was among the escort for the royal yacht HMY Britannia during a royal visit to Canada and took part in the major NATO naval exercise Teamwork '76. In 1977, with Margaree and Athabaskan, Ottawa visited the Soviet Union. Later in the year, the vessel joined STANAVFORLANT, NATO's standing naval force for two months.

In 1981, while inspecting the boilers of Ottawa, cracks were found in the superheaters. This led to all the other remaining St. Laurent-class destroyers to be taken out of service for precautionary inspections. Repairs were effected within 6 months. Ottawa was selected by the Canadian Forces for the Destroyer Life Extension (DELEX) program, and underwent the refit from 19 April to 26 November 1982 at her builder, Canadian Vickers. In June–July 1988, the vessel performed a cruise of the St. Lawrence River and the Great Lakes.

From 6–16 June 1991 Ottawa participated in the NATO naval exercise Ocean Safari 91. She was paid off from active service on 31 July 1992 at Halifax. In February 1994, the ship was sold to Global Shipping of Tampa, Florida. She was towed to India and broken up there in 1994.

== Commemoration ==
The Christening Bells Project at Canadian Forces Base Esquimalt Naval and Military Museum includes information from the ship's bell of HMCS Ottawa which was used for baptism of babies on board ship 1956–1992. The bell is currently held by the CFB Esquimalt Naval & Military Museum, Esquimalt, British Columbia.
