= HMCS Assiniboine (DDH 234) =

Destroyer of the Royal Canadian Navy

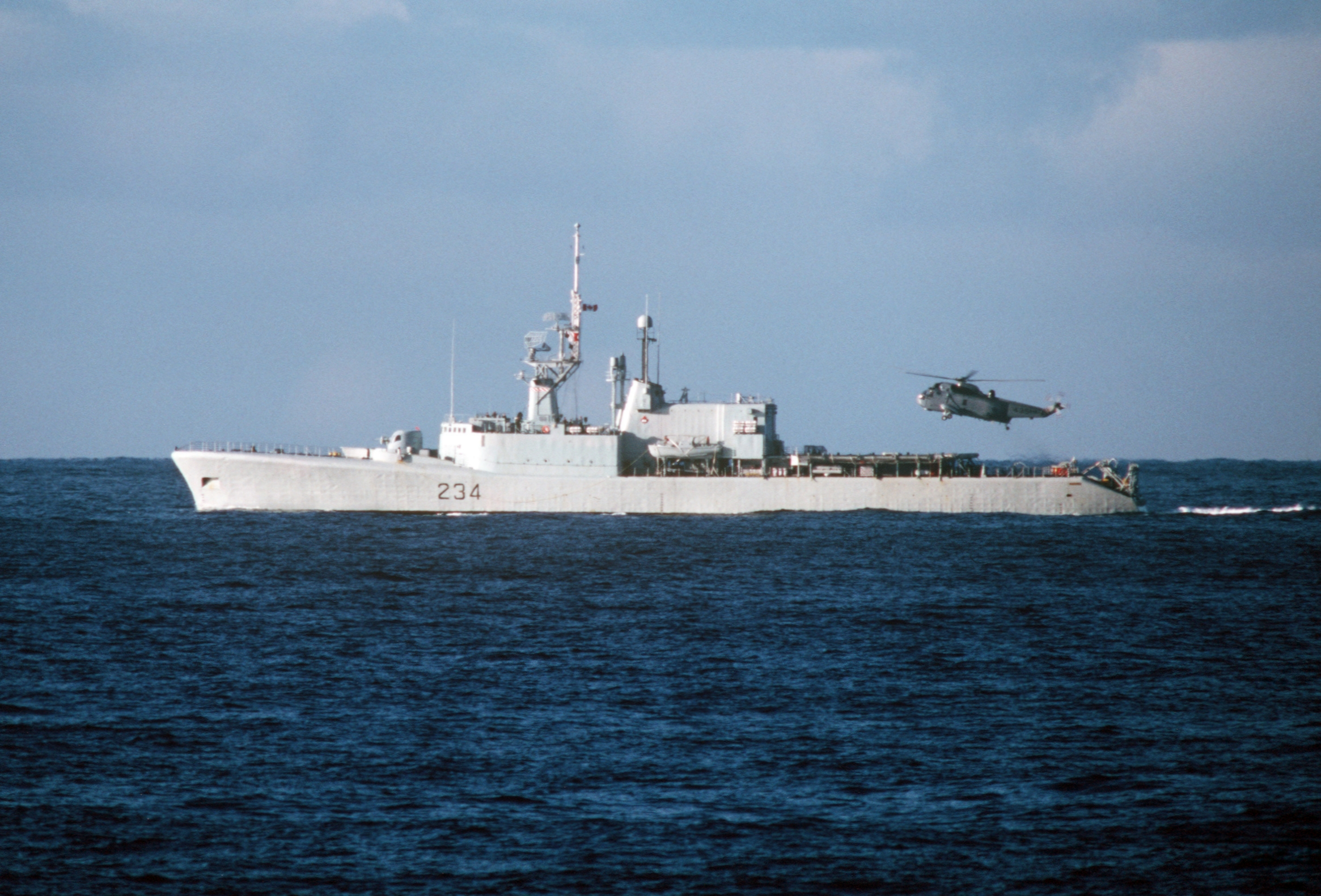
- HMCS Assiniboine (DDH 234) in 1986

History

Canada
- Name: Assiniboine
- Namesake: Assiniboine River
- Builder: Marine Industries, Sorel
- Laid down: 19 May 1952
- Launched: 12 February 1954
- Commissioned: 16 August 1956
- Decommissioned: 14 December 1988
- Reclassified: 28 June 1963 (as DDH)
- Identification: 234
- Honours and awards: Atlantic 1939–45, Biscay 1944, English Channel 1944–45
- Fate: Sank in 1995 in the Caribbean Sea while under tow to breakers.
- Badge: Or, a bend wavy azure charged with two cotises wavy argent, over all a bison's head caboshed proper.

General characteristics
- Type: St. Laurent-class destroyer escort
- Displacement: As DDE: 2263 tons (normal), 2800 tons (deep load); As DDH: 2260 tons (normal), 3051 tons (deep load)
- Length: 366 ft (111.6 m)
- Beam: 42 ft (12.8 m)
- Draught: As DDE: 13 ft (4.0 m); As DDH:14 ft (4.3 m)
- Propulsion: 2-shaft English-Electric geared steam turbines, 3 Babcock & Wilcox boilers 22,000 kW (30,000 shp)
- Speed: 28.5 knots (52.8 km/h)
- Range: 4,570 nautical miles (8,463.6 km) at 12 knots (22.2 km/h)
- Complement: As DDE: 249; As DDH: 213 plus 20 aircrew
- Sensors & processing systems: As DDE: 1 × SPS-12 air search radar; 1 × SPS-10B surface search radar; 1 × Sperry Mk.2 navigation radar; 1 × SQS-10 or −11 hull mounted active search and attack sonar; 1 × SQS-501 (Type 162) high frequency bottom profiling sonar; 1 × SQS-502 (Type 170) high frequency Limbo mortar control sonar; 1 × UQC-1B "Gertrude" underwater telephone; 1 × GUNAR (Mk.64 GFCS with 2 on-mount SPG-48 directors); As DDH: 1 × SPS-12 air search radar; 1 × SPS-10B surface search radar; 1 × Sperry Mk.2 navigation radar; 1 × URN 20 TACAN radar; 1 × SQS-10 or −11 hull mounted active search and attack sonar; 1 × SQS-501 (Type 162) high frequency bottom profiling sonar; 1 × SQS-502 (Type 170) high frequency Limbo mortar control sonar; 1 × SQS-504 VDS, medium frequency active search (except 233 after 1986); 1 × UQC-1B "Gertrude" underwater telephone; 1 × GUNAR (Mk.64 GFCS with 1 on-mount SPG-48 director)
- Electronic warfare & decoys: As DDE: 1 × DAU HF/DF (high frequency direction finder); As DDH: 1 × WLR 1C radar warning; 1 × UPD 501 radar detection; 1 × SRD 501 HF/DF
- Armament: As DDE: 2 × 3 in (76 mm) Mk.33 FMC twin mounts guns; 2 × 40 mm "Boffin" single mount guns; 2 × Mk NC 10 Limbo ASW mortars; 2 × single Mk.2 "K-gun" launchers with homing torpedoes; As DDH: 1 × 3"/50 Mk.33 FMC twin mount gun; 1 × Mk NC 10 Limbo ASW mortar; 2 × triple Mk.32 12.75 inch launchers firing Mk.44 or Mk.46 Mod 5 torpedoes
- Aircraft carried: As DDH: 1 × CH-124 Sea King
- Aviation facilities: As DDH: 1 × midships helicopter deck with Beartrap and hangar

HMCS Assiniboine was a St. Laurent-class destroyer that served in the Royal Canadian Navy and later the Canadian Forces from 1956 to 1988. She was the second ship to bear the name. Entering service in 1956, the ship underwent conversion to a destroyer helicopter escort (DDH) in 1962, the conversion performed primarily by Victoria Machinery Depot. She was officially reclassed with pennant DDH 234 on 28 June 1963. After being paid off in 1988, the vessel was used as a harbour training ship until being discarded in 1995. The vessel sank under tow to the breakers that year.

== Design and description ==
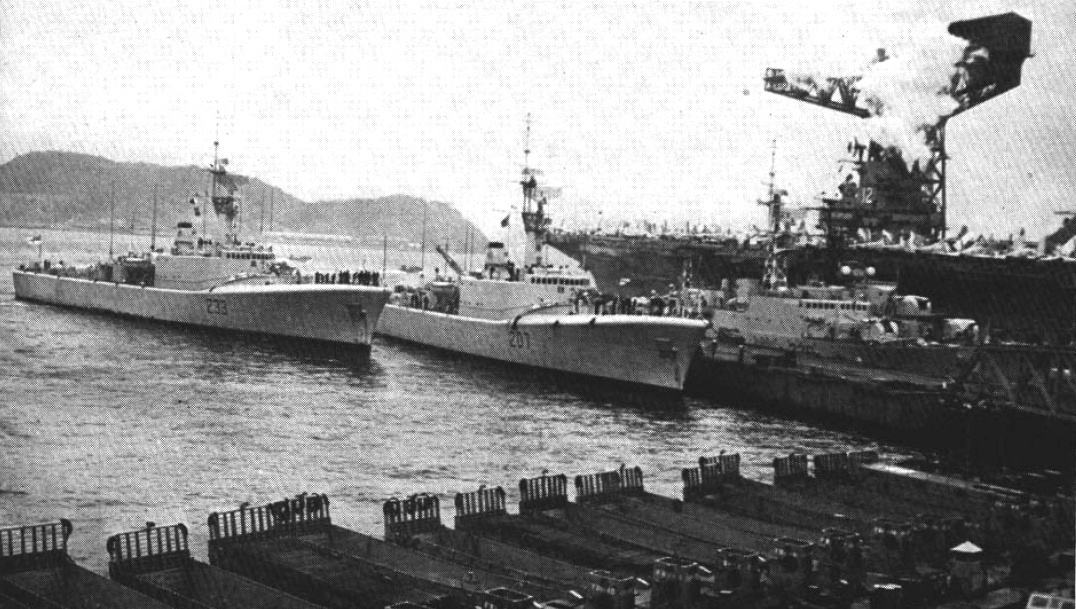
St. Laurent-class destroyers in their original configuration

The need for the St. Laurent class came about in 1949 when Canada joined NATO and the Cold War was in its infancy. The Royal Canadian Navy (RCN) was assigned responsibility for anti-submarine warfare (ASW) and controlling sea space in the western North Atlantic. The St Laurent class were built to an operational requirement much like that which produced the British Type 12, and were powered by the same machinery plant. The rounded deck-edge forward was adopted to prevent ice forming. The vessels were designed to operate in harsh Canadian conditions. They were built to counter nuclear, biological and chemical attack conditions, which led to a design with a rounded hull, a continuous main deck, and the addition of a pre-wetting system to wash away contaminants. The living spaces on the ship were part of a "citadel" which could be sealed off from contamination for the crew safety. The ships were sometimes referred to as "Cadillacs" for their relatively luxurious crew compartments; these were also the first Canadian warships to have a bunk for every crew member since previous warship designs had used hammocks.

As built, the ships were 366 feet (112 m) long overall with a beam of 42 feet (13 m) and a draught of 13 feet 2 inches (4.01 m). The destroyer escorts displaced 2,263 tonnes (2,227 long tons) standard and 2,800 tonnes (2,800 long tons) at deep load. (Note: Conway's says 2000 tons standard displacement, 2600 deep load.) The destroyer escorts had a crew of 12 officers and 237 enlisted.

=== Armament ===
The St. Laurent class was fitted with twin 3-inch (76 mm)/L50 caliber guns in two mounts for engaging both surface and air targets. The ships were also fitted with two single-mounted 40 mm (1.6 in) guns. The class's anti-submarine armament consisted of a pair of triple-barreled Mk. NC 10 Limbo ASW mortars in a stern well. The stern well had a roller top to close it off from following seas. As with the British Type 12 design, the provision for long-range homing torpedoes (in this case BIDDER [Mk 20E] or the US Mark 35) were included. However, they were never fitted.

=== Machinery ===
The vessels of the St. Laurent class had two Babcock & Wilcox water tube boilers installed. The steam produced by these boilers was directed at two geared steam turbines which powered two shafts, providing 22,000 kilowatts (30,000 shp) to drive the ship at a maximum speed of 28.5 knots (52.8 km/h). The ships had an endurance of 4,570 nautical miles (8,460 km) at 12 knots (22 km/h).

=== DDH conversion ===
Following successful trials aboard the frigate Buckingham and sister ship Ottawa, plans to convert the St. Laurent class took shape. Th development of the beartrap, installed in Assiniboine during her 1962–63 conversion, finalized the concept. By keeping the aircraft secure, the beartrap eliminated the need for deck handling from landing to the hangar, or from hangar to takeoff.

In the conversion to a helicopter-carrying vessel, Assiniboine was gutted except for machinery and some forward spaces. The hull was strengthened, and fuelling facilities for the helicopter and active fin stabilizers were installed. The fin stabilizers were to reduce roll in rough weather during helicopter operations. All seven St Laurents were fitted with helicopter platforms and SQS 504 Variable Depth Sonar (VDS). The single funnel was altered to twin stepped funnels to permit the forward extension of the helicopter hangar. To make room for the helicopter deck, the aft 3-inch mount and one of the Limbos were removed. The two 40 mm guns were also removed. Following the conversion, the displacement remained the same at standard load but at full load, it increased to 3,051 tonnes (3,003 long tons).

=== DELEX program ===
In the late 1970s, under the Destroyer Life Extension (DELEX) program was commissioned to upgrade ten of the St. Laurent-class ships with new electronics, machinery, and hull upgrades and repairs. However, only enough was done to keep the ships in service into the late 1980s. For the St. Laurents, this meant hull and machinery repairs only.

== Operational history ==
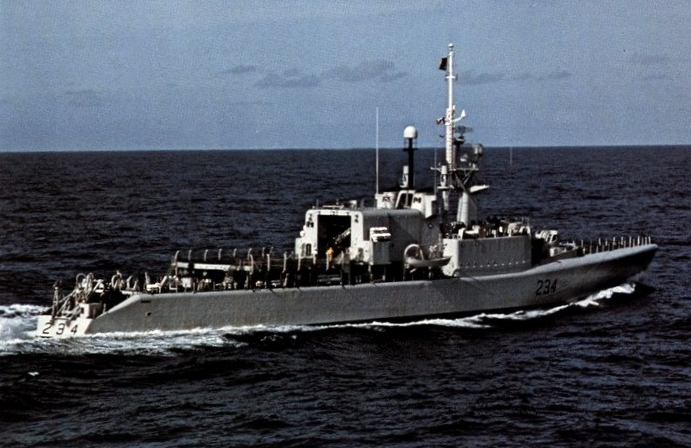
Assiniboine in 1982

Assiniboine was laid down on 19 May 1952 by Marine Industries at Sorel, Quebec and launched on 12 February 1954. The ship was commissioned at Sorel into the Royal Canadian Navy on 16 August 1956 and initially carried the hull number DDE 234 as a destroyer escort.

After commissioning, Assiniboine was assigned to the east coast as part of the Third Canadian Escort Squadron. From October to November 1956, Assiniboine sailed with the First Canadian Escort Squadron to northern Europe, making a series of port visits. In January 1959, she transferred to the west coast and in July, carried Queen Elizabeth II and Prince Philip from Vancouver to Nanaimo. Assiniboine was a member of the Second Canadian Escort Squadron based out of Esquimalt, British Columbia. After returning from her conversion to a helicopter carrying destroyer, she was assigned once again to the east coast. The ship was used for trials of the beartrap hauldown system and spent the following two years finding inclement weather conditions to test the system.

In 1974, Assiniboine was anchored in Lisbon, Portugal as part of the NATO Standing Naval Force Atlantic, with crew ashore, when the Carnation Revolution occurred. The tension and confusion of the situation saw the vessel recall her crew and leave the area. On 21 January 1975, Assiniboine recovered the crew from the freighter Barma, the rescue effort hampered by high winds.

Assiniboine was selected by the Canadian Forces for the Destroyer Life Extension (DELEX) program beginning on 23 April 1979 and completed this refit on 16 November. The refit was performed by Vickers Ltd. at Montreal, Quebec. On 2 July 1981, Assiniboine ran aground in Halifax Harbour in heavy fog, requiring the aid from several tugboats to get free. She had been scheduled to take part in a NATO exercise, but was removed after the ship was required to undergo damage inspection. In 1984, while acting as an escort for the Tall Ships race, she was part of the search for the crew of the lost sailing vessel Marques. In July 1984 the ship returned to Halifax with fractures in the plating of her upper deck. Assiniboine was sent to MIL Davie Shipbuilding at Sorel for a 10-month refit. The refit was extended to 17 months following a series of labour strikes at the shipyard.

She was decommissioned from active service in the Canadian Forces on 14 December 1988 and was used as a harbour training ship at CFB Halifax beginning on 3 January 1989. The ship was sold for scrap in January 1995 and sank in the Caribbean Sea while under tow.
