= HMCS Buckingham =

Frigate of the Royal Canadian Navy

History

Canada
- Name: Buckingham
- Namesake: Buckingham, Quebec
- Ordered: 1 February 1943
- Builder: Davie Shipbuilding, Lauzon
- Yard number: 558
- Laid down: 11 November 1943
- Launched: 28 April 1944
- Commissioned: 2 November 1944
- Decommissioned: 16 November 1945
- Identification: Pennant number: K 685
- Recommissioned: 25 June 1954
- Reclassified: Prestonian-class frigate 1954
- Decommissioned: 23 March 1965
- Identification: pennant number: FFE 314
- Honours and awards: Atlantic 1945
- Fate: Sold, scrapped 1966
- Badge: Gules, a swan, wings displayed argent gorged with coronet of Canada, or

General characteristics
- Class & type: River-class frigate
- Displacement: 1,445 long tons (1,468 t; 1,618 short tons); 2,110 long tons (2,140 t; 2,360 short tons) (deep load)
- Length: 283 ft (86.26 m) p/p; 301.25 ft (91.82 m)o/a
- Beam: 36.5 ft (11.13 m)
- Draught: 9 ft (2.74 m); 13 ft (3.96 m) (deep load)
- Propulsion: 2 × Admiralty 3-drum boilers, 2 shafts, reciprocating vertical triple expansion, 5,500 ihp (4,100 kW)
- Speed: 20 knots (37.0 km/h); 20.5 knots (38.0 km/h) (turbine ships)
- Range: 646 long tons (656 t; 724 short tons) oil fuel; 7,500 nautical miles (13,890 km) at 15 knots (27.8 km/h)
- Complement: 157
- Armament: 2 × QF 4 in (102 mm)/45 Mk. XVI on twin mount HA/LA Mk.XIX; 8 × 20 mm QF Oerlikon A/A on twin mounts Mk.V; 1 × Hedgehog 24 spigot A/S projector; up to 150 depth charges

HMCS Buckingham was a River-class frigate that served with the Royal Canadian Navy during the Second World War and as a Prestonian-class frigate from 1954–1965. She was named for Buckingham, Quebec. She is considered a significant part of Canadian naval history as used for some early trials of helicopter landings on smaller escort vessels. This led to the development of the future helicopter carrying destroyers.

Buckingham was ordered 1 February 1943 as part of the 1943–1944 River-class building program. She was laid down as Royal Mount on 11 November 1943 by Davie Shipbuilding & Repairing Co. Ltd. at Lauzon and launched 28 April 1944. Her name was changed to Buckingham and she was commissioned on 2 November 1944 at Quebec City.

== Background ==
The River-class frigate was designed by William Reed of Smith's Dock Company of South Bank-on-Tees. Originally called a "twin-screw corvette", its purpose was to improve on the convoy escort classes in service with the Royal Navy at the time, including the Flower-class corvette. The first orders were placed by the Royal Navy in 1940 and the vessels were named for rivers in the United Kingdom, giving name to the class. In Canada they were named for towns and cities though they kept the same designation. The name "frigate" was suggested by Vice-Admiral Percy Nelles of the Royal Canadian Navy and was adopted later that year.

Improvements over the corvette design included markedly better accommodation. The twin engines gave only three more knots of speed but extended the range of the ship to nearly double that of a corvette at 7,200 nautical miles (13,300 km) at 12 knots. Among other lessons applied to the design was an armament package better designed to combat U-boats including a twin 4-inch mount forward and 12-pounder aft. 15 Canadian frigates were initially fitted with a single 4-inch gun forward but with the exception of Valleyfield, they were all eventually upgraded to the double mount. For underwater targets, the River-class frigate was equipped with a Hedgehog anti-submarine mortar and depth charge rails aft and four side-mounted throwers.

River-class frigates were the first Royal Canadian Navy warships to carry the 147B Sword horizontal fan echo sonar transmitter in addition to the regular ASDIC. This allowed the ship to maintain contact with targets even while firing unless a target was struck. Improved radar and direction-finding equipment improved the RCN's ability to find and track enemy submarines over the previous classes.

Canada originally ordered the construction of 33 frigates in October 1941. The design was too big for the shipyards on the Great Lakes so all the frigates built in Canada were built in dockyards along the west coast or along the St. Lawrence River. In all Canada ordered the construction of 60 frigates including ten for the Royal Navy that in turn transferred two to the United States Navy.

== Service history ==
Buckingham returned to Halifax after working up at Bermuda in January 1945 and was assigned to the convoy escort group EG 28. She remained with this unit until the end of hostilities in Europe performing local escort duties for coastal convoys along the eastern coast of Canada.

On 10 May, U-889 was spotted south of Newfoundland by a RCAF airplane, steaming at 10 knots (19 km/h; 12 mph) and flying a black flag of surrender. The RCAF plane radioed to nearby Western Escort Force W-6 who intercepted the submarine an hour later. U-889 was ordered to head to Bay Bulls, Newfoundland. 24 hours later U-889 was turned over to the frigates Buckingham and Inch Arran who escorted her to Shelburne Harbour where she was boarded.

In June 1945, Buckingham began a tropicalization refit at Liverpool, Nova Scotia in preparation for service in the Pacific Ocean. She moved to Shelburne to complete it however it was suspended before the work was done due to the Surrender of Japan. She was paid off 16 November 1945 at Sydney and placed in reserve.

=== Postwar service ===
Buckingham was sold to Marine Industries Ltd. in 1946. She was reacquired by the RCN to undergo conversion to a Prestonian-class ocean escort from 1953–1954. This meant a flush-decked appearance aft, with a larger bridge and taller funnel. Her hull forward was strengthened against ice and the quarterdeck was enclosed to contain two Squid anti-submarine mortars. Buckingham recommissioned at Montreal on 25 June 1954 with the pennant number 314.

Upon return to service, Buckingham was used for training purposes and assigned to HMCS Cornwallis. In the summer of 1956, the Royal Canadian Navy believed that flying a helicopter equipped for anti-submarine warfare could be "married" to an existing anti-submarine platform such as a destroyer or frigate. To prove this, the RCN attached a small landing pad aft to Buckingham in October–December 1956 and attempted to land a Sikorsky HO4S-3 on it. The attempts were successful and the pad was removed and tested again on the larger Ottawa. These trials demonstrated that a helicopter could be landed and would lead to the development of the Beartrap, a mechanism designed by the RCN to keep the helicopter attached to the deck once it had landed. In 1961, the frigate was a member of the Ninth Canadian Escort Squadron. In June 1961, Buckingham toured the Great Lakes, making several port visits.

Buckingham served until paid off on 23 March 1965. She was sold for scrap and broken up at La Spezia, Italy in 1966.
