= Beartrap (hauldown device) =

Naval helicopter landing assist device

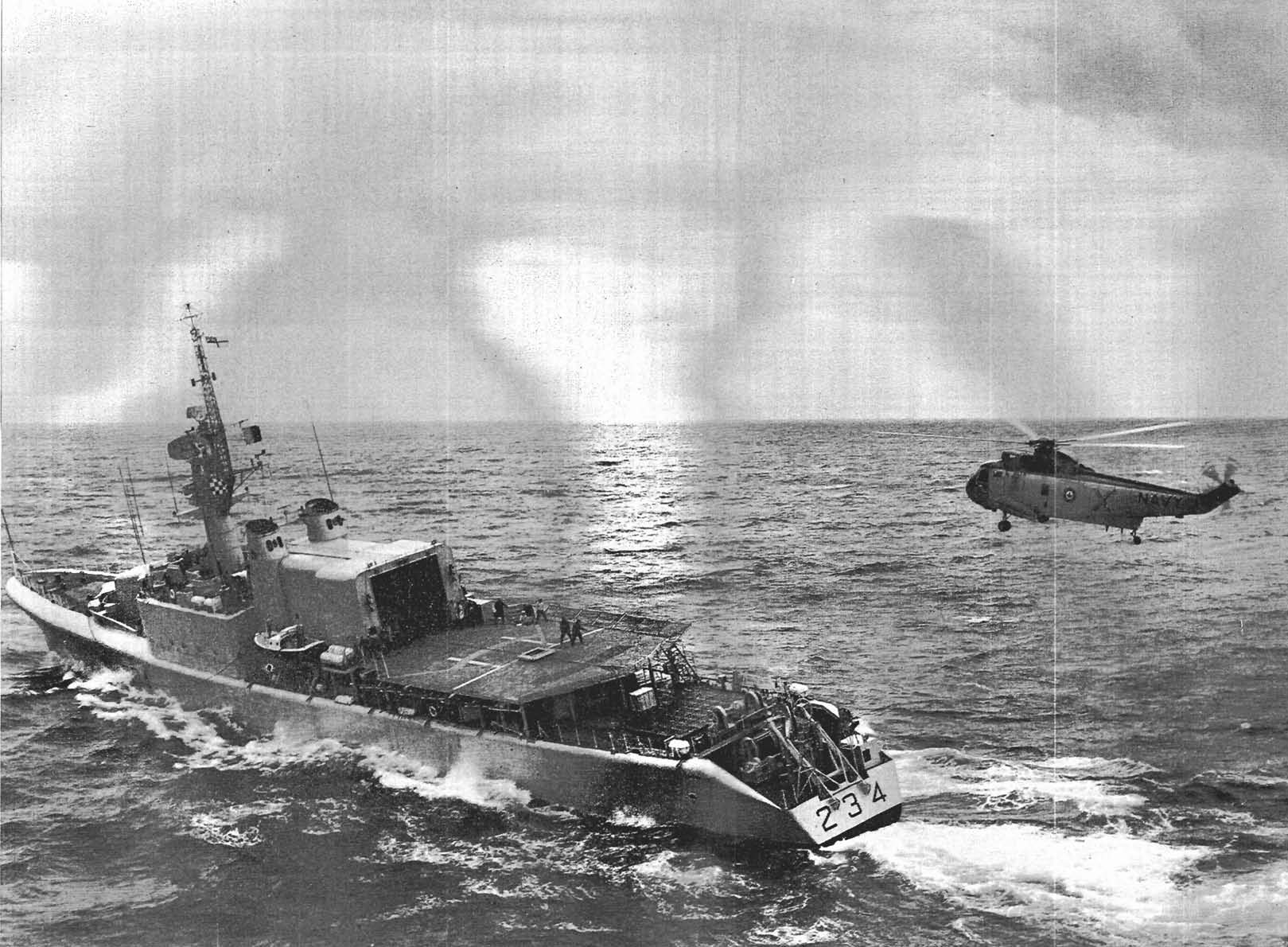
A Sea King helicopter landing on HMCS Assiniboine (DDH 234); the beartrap is the small rectangle on the flight deck.

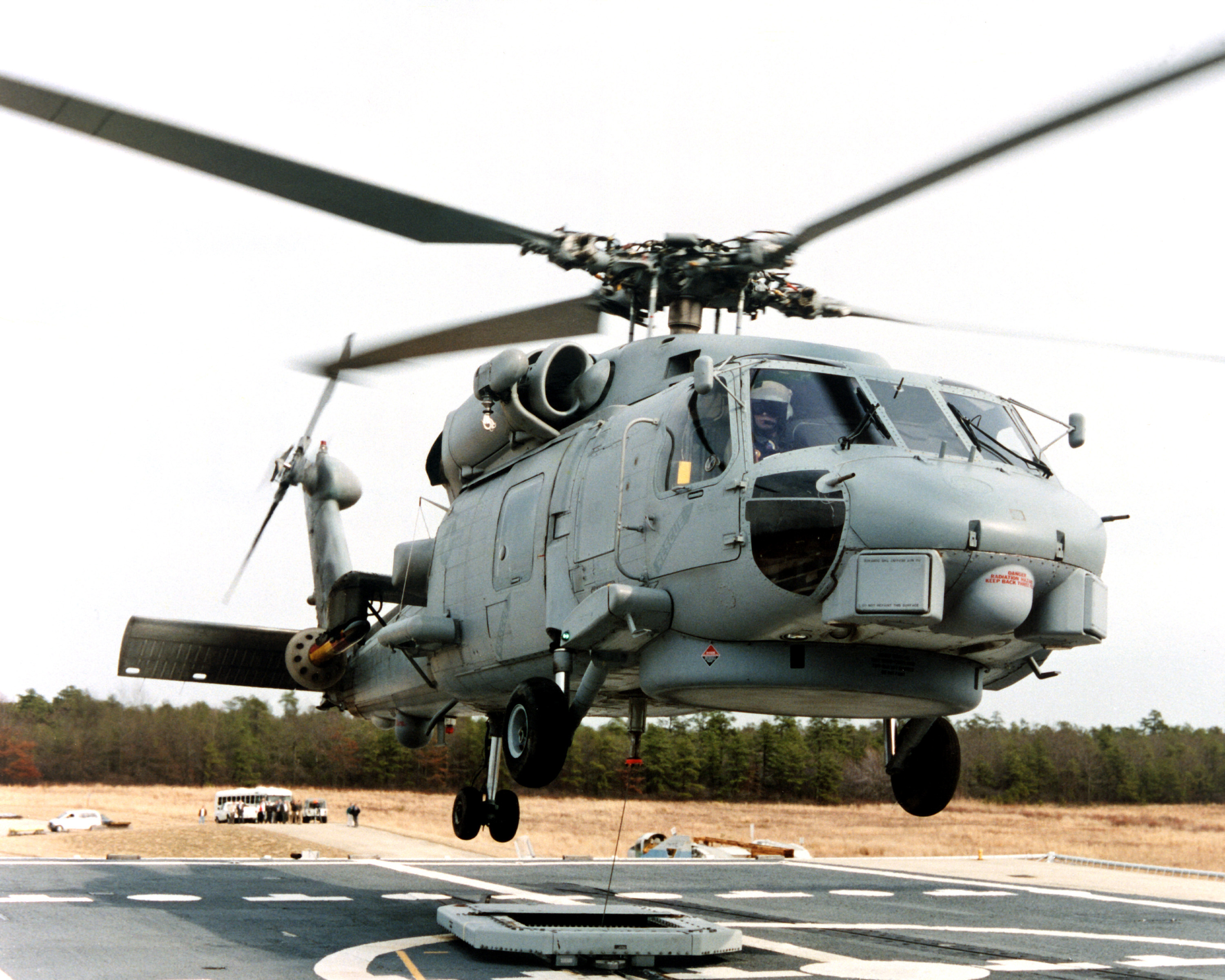
Recover assist landing of a SH-60B helicopter with a RAST system

A helicopter hauldown and rapid securing device (HHRSD) or beartrap enables the landing and handling of helicopters and unmanned aerial vehicles (UAVs) aboard small ships in poor weather.

The beartrap was developed by the Royal Canadian Navy (RCN) in the 1950s and 1960s, and entered service in 1967. It was quickly adopted by other navies and remains in use.

== History ==
By the mid-1950s, many navies were introducing ship-based helicopters to perform a variety of functions, from logistical support to anti-submarine warfare. However, a common difficulty was landing and handling the aircraft, particularly larger ones, on a flight deck in motion. These conditions were particularly acute in poor weather and on smaller ships. Fitting ships with roll-dampening fins provided insufficient mitigation. At the time, aircraft carriers were considered to be the only practical platforms for operating helicopters at sea.

The RCN began investigating the problem in the 1950s. Early trials used the frigate HMCS Buckingham refitted with a flight deck and the initial version of the beartrap; successful trials were conducted with a Sikorsky HO4S-3 and then a larger Sikorsky H-34 helicopter. The beartrap was redesigned by Fairey Aviation, based in Dartmouth, Nova Scotia and first installed on HMCS Assiniboine (DDH 234) during a 1962-1963 refit. The trials used the new Sikorsky CH-124 Sea King from late-1963. An issue with the haul-down cable snapping was resolved. The beartrap was considered successful by mid-1964, becoming the first successful system of its kind.

The initial version of the beartrap did not have a hauldown cable; this was added because initial trials showed the trap area was too small.

The beartrap entered RCN service in April 1967. The first RCN helicopter to use the system operationally was the CH-124. The Sikorsky CH-148 Cyclone is also fitted to work with the beartrap.

The beartrap was subsequently adopted by other navies, including the United States Navy (USN), the Royal Navy, Royal Australian Navy (RAN), and the Japan Maritime Self-Defense Force. All systems operate on similar principles. The beartrap is also used for unmanned aerial vehicles.

== Design and operation ==
The beartrap's main components on the ship are the rapid securing device, the haul-down cable that emerges from the centre of the rapid securing device, and the winch connected to the haul-down cable. The helicopter hovers over the landing pad and lowers a messenger cable from a belly-mounted probe. The deck crew connects the messenger to the heavier haul-down cable. The helicopter pulls the haul-down cable up and secures it to the probe, then increases power to maintain hover. The cable is kept in constant tension to prevent the ship's movements from impacting the helicopter; constant tension is automatically maintained with sensors, hydraulics, and shock absorbers. The ship slowly pulls the helicopter down with the winch. The landing safety officer (LSO) controls the winch and decides when to order the helicopter to land. The rapid securing device captures the probe and secures the helicopter to the deck. The whole process takes about five minutes.

The beartrap moves along a track in the deck, and can move the captured helicopter to and from the hangar without manhandling or conventional towing.

When beartrap entered service in 1967, it was cleared for day and night operations, and usage in sea state 6 with 30° of rolling and 9° of pitching.

== Variants ==
Helicopter Hauldown and Rapid Securing Device (HHRSD)
Original version developed for the RCN
Recovery Assist Securing and Traversing (RAST) Mk I
Development of HHRSD by Indal Technologies and used by the USN.
RAST Mk II
RAN version; none produced.
CPF RAST
Indal variant of the RAST Mk I. Installed on the Halifax-class frigate.

== Similar systems ==
- TRIGON

== See also ==
- Aircraft Ship Integrated Secure and Traverse, a later Indal helicopter recovery system

== Sources ==
- Johnson, Ron (September 1989). "RAST MK III: A New-Generation Helicopter Handling System". Maritime Engineering Journal. Director General Maritime Equipment Program Management. ISSN 0713-0058.
