= Prestonian-class frigate =

Class overview
- Operators: Royal Canadian Navy / Canadian Forces; Royal Norwegian Navy
- Preceded by: River class
- Succeeded by: General Purpose Frigate (planned); Halifax class (actual)
- In commission: 28 August 1953 – 15 September 1967
- Planned: 21
- Completed: 21
- Retired: 21

General characteristics
- Type: Frigate
- Displacement: 2,360 t (2,360.0 t) (full load)
- Length: 301.25 ft (91.82 m)o/a
- Beam: 36.5 ft (11.13 m)
- Draught: 12 ft (3.66 m)
- Propulsion: 2 x Admiralty 3-drum boilers, 2 shafts, reciprocating vertical triple expansion, 5,500 ihp (4,100 kW)
- Speed: 19 knots (35.2 km/h)
- Complement: 140
- Sensors & processing systems: 1 × USN SU Type radar (4-inch gunnery spotting); 1 × Sperry Mk.2 navigation radar; 1 × Type 147 target depth finding sonar; 1 × Type 164B search sonar; 1 × SQS 501 (Type 162) bottom profiler sonar; 1 × Optical fire control director for twin 40mm
- Electronic warfare & decoys: 1 × DAU hf/df; 1 × AN/UPD 501 d/f
- Armament: 1 × twin QF 4 in (102 mm)/45 QF Mk.16 guns; 1 × twin 40 mm/56 Mk.5 guns; 2–4 x 40 mm/56 Boffin guns; 2 × Squid Mk.4 ASW 3-barrelled mortars
- Aviation facilities: HMCS Buckingham fitted with flight deck for helicopter tests.

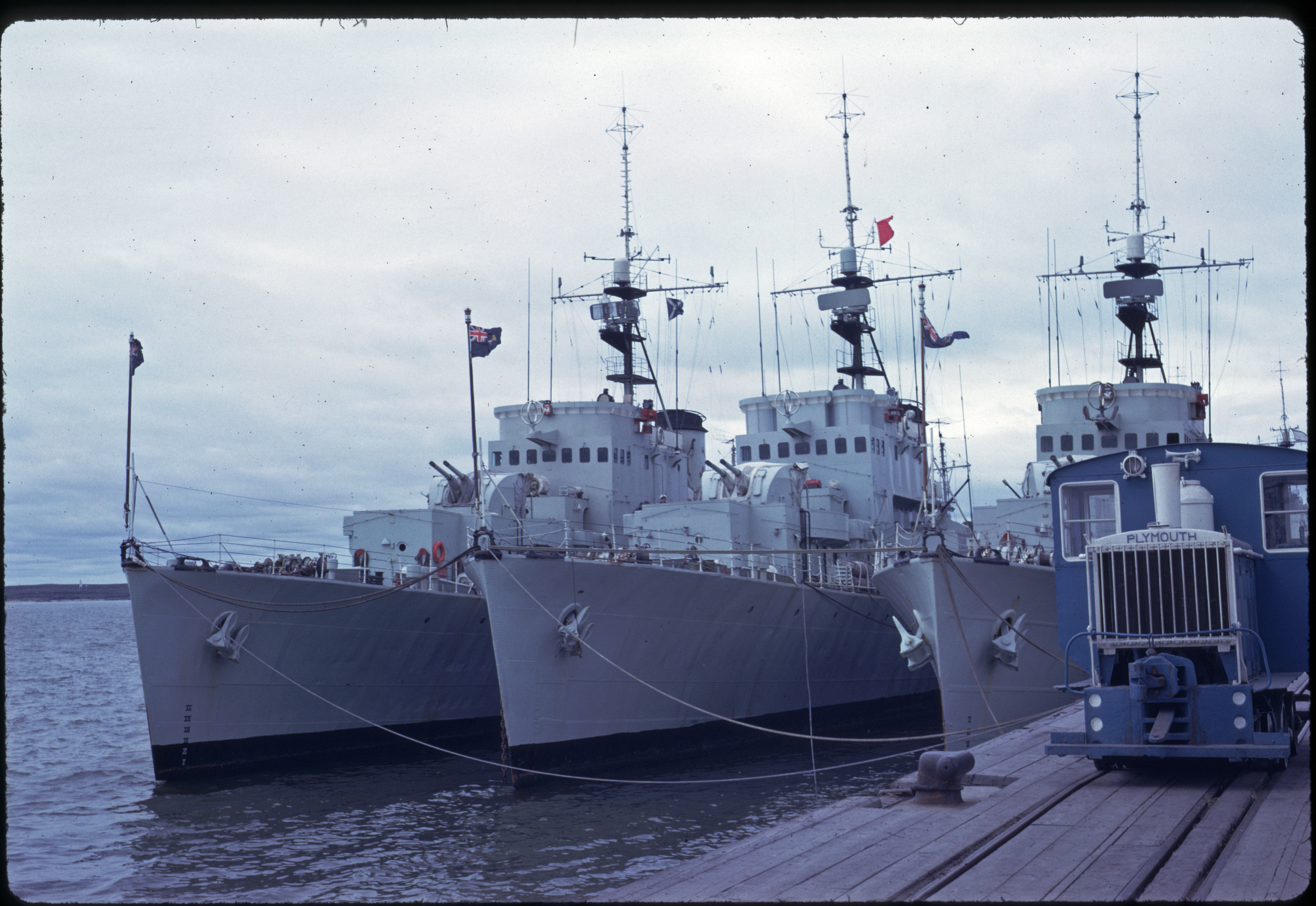
HMCS Buckingham, HMCS Lauzon, and HMCS Swansea at Fort Churchill in 1962

The Prestonian-class ocean anti-submarine escort frigate was a class of 21 frigates that served with the Royal Canadian Navy from 1953 to 1967 and with the Royal Norwegian Navy from 1956 to 1977.

They were converted from mothballed River-class frigates of British design that had been placed in reserve following the end of the Second World War. The first vessel to be reactivated and undergo refit was Prestonian which was recommissioned on 28 August 1953. The class did not use sequential pennant numbers.

== History ==
During the Korean War, Canada committed to the North Atlantic Treaty Organization (NATO). It was believed at the time that there was a strategic threat to the shipping lanes supplying the European continent by the Soviet Union. This belief originated due to Soviet submarines becoming increasingly difficult to detect and identify, as a result of their updated technology.

Vice-Admiral H.T.W. Grant, Chief of the Naval Staff of Canada, promised that Canada would contribute anti-submarine escort forces to combat the threat. Originally that meant updating only the existing fleet, however this policy was expanded when 21 decommissioned River-class frigates were converted to ocean escorts and recommissioned into the Royal Canadian Navy.

The concept of anti-submarine warfare performed from a helicopter operating from the decks of escorts had been first proposed during the Second World War. Canada was the first nation to test a fully capable anti-submarine warfare helicopter flying from an escort. HMCS Buckingham had a helicopter flight deck attached to her stern and performed sea trials from October to December 1956. These trials preceded the design of the destroyer helicopter carriers of the Royal Canadian Navy.

In 1956, three frigates, HMCS Prestonian, HMCS Penetang and HMCS Toronto were loaned to the Royal Norwegian Navy and renamed Troll, Draug and Garm respectively. They were purchased outright in 1959 and were the only export of the class.

Three further River-class frigates, HMCS Stone Town, HMCS St. Catharines and HMCS St. Stephen, were disarmed and transferred to the Department of Transport of Canada for use as weather ships, but were given Royal Canadian Navy pennant numbers and were subsequently considered as part of the class.

== Modifications ==
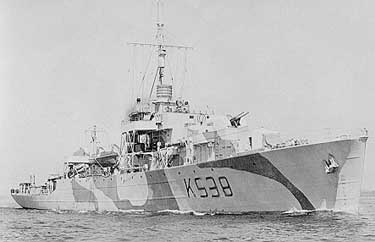
HMCS Toronto prior to modification – note the lower deck aft

The River-class frigate was a successful Canadian-built escort design from the Second World War, However, there was a requirement to update this design to meet the needs of the post-war Canadian Navy and to match the threat of the Soviet submarine force.

The fo'c'sle deck was extended aft and was wall-sided. This extra space was primarily devoted to improved habitability. All accommodation throughout the ship was improved. Each crew member was given their own bunk. The space was also used for generating machinery required by for anti-submarine warfare. This machinery was changed from three steam and one diesel to two steam and two diesel generators. The quarterdeck was enclosed to house two Squid anti-submarine mortars.

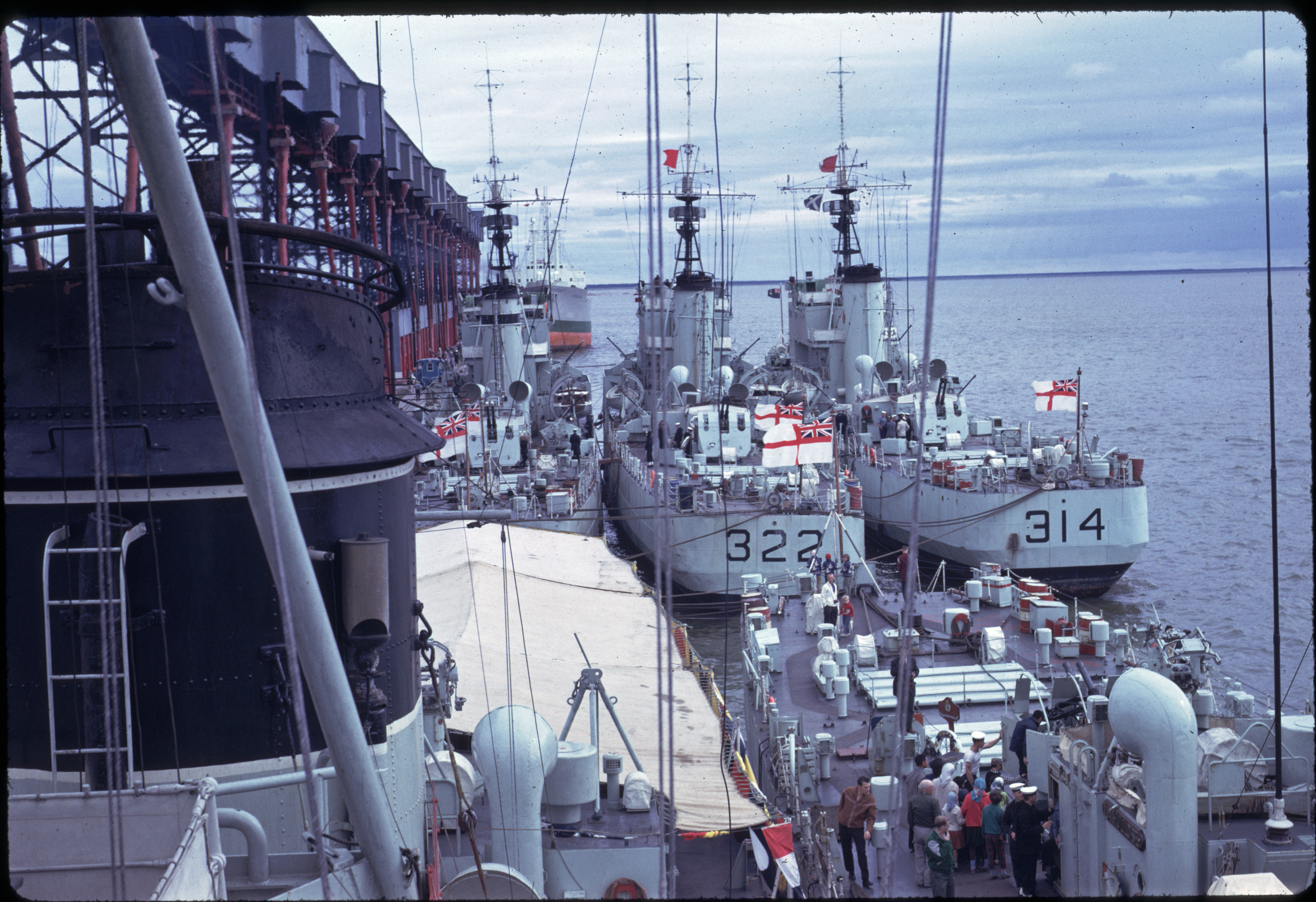
9th squadron visit to Fort Churchill, autumn 1962

A much larger bridge structure was installed that was almost entirely enclosed. The upper works were constructed of aluminum instead of steel to save weight. This necessitated a heightened funnel to clear the new structure, which in turn required a larger mast. This mast remained a tripod. The propelling machinery was overhauled and the hull forward was strengthened forward to protect against ice.

One ship, Buckingham, had a flight deck attached aft for helicopter landing and takeoff sea trials, but the structure was removed once the trials were completed.

== Ships ==
Royal Canadian Navy
Ship	Pennant number	Builder	Laid down	Launched	Commissioned	Paid off	Fate
Antigonish	FFE 301	Yarrows Ltd., Esquimalt	2 October 1943	10 February 1944	12 October 1957	30 November 1966	Broken up in Japan 1968
Beacon Hill	FFE 303	Yarrows Ltd., Esquimalt	16 July 1943	6 November 1943	21 December 1957	15 September 1967	Became training ship in 1949 and scrapped Sakai, Japan 1968
Buckingham	FFE 314	Davie Shipbuilding & Repairing Co. Ltd., Lauzon	11 November 1943	28 April 1944	25 June 1954	23 March 1965	Broken up La Spezia, Italy 1966
Cap de la Madeleine	FFE 317	Morton Engineering & Dry Dock Co., Quebec City	5 November 1943	13 May 1944	7 December 1954	15 May 1965	broken up La Spezia, Italy 1966
Fort Erie	FFE 312	Davie Shipbuilding & Repairing Co. Ltd., Lauzon	3 November 1943	27 May 1944	17 April 1956	26 March 1965	sold for scrap and broken up La Spezia, Italy 1966
Inch Arran	FFE 308	Davie Shipbuilding & Repairing Co. Ltd., Lauzon	25 October 1943	6 June 1944	23 August 1954	23 June 1965	sold and maybe broken up 1970
Jonquiere	FFE 318	Davie Shipbuilding & Repairing Co. Ltd., Lauzon	26 January 1943	28 October 1943	20 September 1954	23 September 1966	Broken up Victoria, BC 1967
La Hulloise	FFE 305	Canadian Vickers, Montreal	10 August 1943	29 October 1943	9 October 1957	16 July 1965	Sold and broken up La Spezia, Italy 1966
Lanark	FFE 321	Canadian Vickers, Montreal	25 September 1943	10 December 1943	15 April 1956	19 March 1965	Broken up La Spezia, Italy 1966
Lauzon	FFE 322	Davie Shipbuilding & Repairing Co. Ltd., Lauzon	2 July 1943	10 June 1944	12 December 1953	24 May 1963	Sold in Toronto 1964, likely scrapped.
New Glasgow	FFE 315	Yarrows Ltd., Esquimalt	2 December 1942	23 June 1943	30 January 1954	30 January 1967	Sold and broken up Japan 1967
New Waterford	FFE 304	Yarrows Ltd., Esquimalt	17 December 1943	3 July 1943	31 January 1958	22 December 1966	Broken up Savona, Italy in 1967.
Outremont	FFE 310	Morton Engineering & Dry Dock Co., Quebec City	18 November 1942	3 July 1943	2 September 1955	7 June 1965	Broken up La Spezia, Italy in 1966.
Penetang	FFE 316	Davie Shipbuilding & Repairing Co. Ltd., Lauzon	22 September 1943	6 July 1944	1 June 1954	25 January 1956	Broken up Oslo, Norway after 1966.
Prestonian	FFE 307	Davie Shipbuilding & Repairing Co. Ltd., Lauzon	20 July 1943	22 June 1944	22 August 1953	24 April 1956	Loaned to Norway 1956, sold outright 1959 and scrapped 1966
St. Catharines	FFE 324	Yarrows Ltd., Esquimalt	2 May 1942	5 December 1942	31 July 1943	14 December 1945	Transferred to Department of Transport as CGS St. Catharines, serving as a weather monitoring ship in the North Pacific, 1952–1967. Sold, 1968 as fish factory ship in Vancouver, BC.
St. Stephen	FFE 323	Yarrows Ltd., Esquimalt	5 October 1943	6 February 1944	28 July 1944	30 January 1946	Used as Weather ship by RCN from 1947 to 1950. Transferred to Dept. of Transport in 1950 as CGS St. Stephen and used as weather ship until 1968.
Ste. Therese	FFE 309	Davie Shipbuilding & Repairing Co. Ltd., Lauzon	18 May 1943	16 October 1943	21 January 1955	30 January 1967	Broken up in Japan in 1967
Stettler	FFE 311	Canadian Vickers, Montreal	31 May 1943	9 October 1943	2 February 1954	31 August 1966	Sold broken up in Victoria, BC 1967.
Stone Town	FFE 302	Canadian Vickers, Montreal	17 November 1943	28 March 1944	21 July 1944	13 November 1945	Transferred to Department of Transport as CGS Stone Town, serving as a weather monitoring ship in the North Pacific, 1952–1967. Sold, 1968 as fish factory ship in Vancouver, BC
Sussexvale	FFE 313	Davie Shipbuilding & Repairing Co. Ltd., Lauzon	15 November 1943	12 July 1944	8 August 1955	30 November 1966	
Swansea	FFE 306	Yarrows Ltd., Esquimalt	15 July 1942	19 December 1942	14 November 1957	14 October 1966	Sold August 1967, broken up Savona, Italy 1967.
Toronto	FFE 319	Davie Shipbuilding & Repairing Co. Ltd., Lauzon	10 May 1943	18 September 1943	26 November 1953	14 April 1956	Transferred to Norway in 1956 as Garm and then as Valkyrien; scrapped 1977.
Victoriaville	FFE 320	Davie Shipbuilding & Repairing Co. Ltd., Lauzon	2 December 1943	23 June 1944	25 September 1959	December 1966	Decommissioned as a Prestonian-class frigate, December 1966; recommissioned as diving tender HMCS Granby. Finally decommissioned, 31 December 1973 and scrap in 1974.
