= HMCS Cap de la Madeleine =

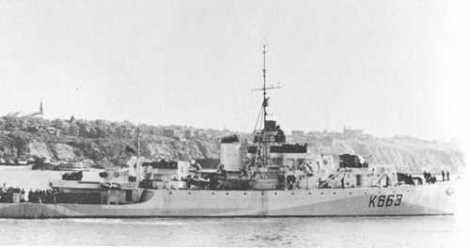
- HMCS Cap de la Madeleine

History

Canada
- Name: Cap de la Madeleine
- Namesake: Cap-de-la-Madeleine, Quebec
- Ordered: October 1941
- Builder: Morton Engineering & Dry Dock Co., Quebec City
- Yard number: 31
- Laid down: 5 November 1943
- Launched: 13 May 1944
- Commissioned: 30 September 1944
- Decommissioned: 25 November 1945
- Identification: Pennant number: K663
- Recommissioned: 7 December 1954
- Decommissioned: 15 May 1965
- Reclassified: Prestonian-class frigate
- Identification: pennant number: FFE 317
- Honours and awards: Atlantic 1945
- Fate: Broken up La Spezia, Italy 1966
- Badge: Azure, on an Indian tomahawk and woodsman's axe in saltire argent, an annulet on which a shepherd's crook erect or, and over all within the annulet a lozenge argent charged with an anchor azure.

General characteristics
- Class & type: River-class frigate
- Displacement: 1,445 long tons (1,468 t; 1,618 short tons); 2,110 long tons (2,140 t; 2,360 short tons) (deep load)
- Length: 283 ft (86.26 m) p/p; 301.25 ft (91.82 m)o/a
- Beam: 36.5 ft (11.13 m)
- Draught: 9 ft (2.74 m); 13 ft (3.96 m) (deep load)
- Propulsion: 2 × Admiralty 3-drum boilers, 2 shafts, reciprocating vertical triple expansion, 5,500 ihp (4,100 kW)
- Speed: 20 knots (37.0 km/h); 20.5 knots (38.0 km/h) (turbine ships)
- Range: 646 long tons (656 t; 724 short tons) oil fuel; 7,500 nautical miles (13,890 km) at 15 knots (27.8 km/h)
- Complement: 157
- Armament: 2 × QF 4 in (102 mm)/45 Mk. XVI on twin mount HA/LA Mk.XIX; 1 × QF 12 pdr (3 in (76 mm)) 12 cwt /40 Mk. V on mounting HA/LA Mk.IX (not all ships); 8 × 20 mm QF Oerlikon A/A on twin mounts Mk.V; 1 × Hedgehog 24 spigot A/S projector; up to 150 depth charges

HMCS Cap de la Madeleine was a River-class frigate that served in the Royal Canadian Navy from 1944-1945 and as a Prestonian-class frigate from 1954-1965. She saw action in the Battle of the Atlantic as a convoy escort during the Second World War. She is named for Cap-de-la-Madeleine, Quebec, which is now a part of Trois-Rivières.

Cap de la Madeleine was ordered in October 1941 as part of the 1942-43 building program. She was laid down 5 November 1943 by Morton Engineering & Dry Dock Co., Quebec City and launched 13 May 1944. Cap de la Madeleine was commissioned into the RCN on 30 September 1944 at Quebec City with the pennant K663.

== Background ==
The River-class frigate was designed by William Reed of Smith's Dock Company of South Bank-on-Tees. Originally called a "twin-screw corvette", its purpose was to improve on the convoy escort classes in service with the Royal Navy at the time, including the Flower-class corvette. The first orders were placed by the Royal Navy in 1940 and the vessels were named for rivers in the United Kingdom, giving name to the class. In Canada they were named for towns and cities though they kept the same designation. The name "frigate" was suggested by Vice-Admiral Percy Nelles of the Royal Canadian Navy and was adopted later that year.

Improvements over the corvette design included improved accommodation which was markedly better. The twin engines gave only three more knots of speed but extended the range of the ship to nearly double that of a corvette at 7,200 nautical miles (13,300 km) at 12 knots. Among other lessons applied to the design was an armament package better designed to combat U-boats including a twin 4-inch mount forward and 12-pounder aft. 15 Canadian frigates were initially fitted with a single 4-inch gun forward but with the exception of HMCS Valleyfield, they were all eventually upgraded to the double mount. For underwater targets, the River-class frigate was equipped with a Hedgehog anti-submarine mortar and depth charge rails aft and four side-mounted throwers.

River-class frigates were the first Royal Canadian Navy warships to carry the 147B Sword horizontal fan echo sonar transmitter in addition to the irregular ASDIC. This allowed the ship to maintain contact with targets even while firing unless a target was struck. Improved radar and direction-finding equipment improved the RCN's ability to find and track enemy submarines over the previous classes.

Canada originally ordered the construction of 33 frigates in October 1941. The design was too big for the shipyards on the Great Lakes so all the frigates built in Canada were built in dockyards along the west coast or along the St. Lawrence River. In all Canada ordered the construction of 60 frigates including ten for the Royal Navy that transferred two to the United States Navy.

== Service history ==
After arriving at Halifax, Nova Scotia on 20 October 1944, Cap de la Madeleine sailed soon thereafter to Bermuda for work up. Beginning in December 1944 she was assigned to the Mid-Ocean Escort Force (MOEF) escort group C-7 for convoy escort duty. She departed with eastbound convoy HX 328 but was detached and assigned to the westbound convoy ONS 39 in order to return to Canada for repairs. These repairs were carried out at St. John's, Halifax and Quebec City. They were completed 7 May 1945.

Cap de la Madeleine was then ordered into port at Lauzon, Quebec for a tropicalization refit in preparation for duty in the Pacific Ocean. This was cancelled in August due to the Surrender of Japan. She was paid off at Shelburne, Nova Scotia on 25 November 1945 and placed in reserve.

=== Postwar service ===
Cap de la Madeleine was sold to Marine Industries Ltd. after the war, but was reacquired as one of the River-class frigates to undergo conversion to a Prestonian-class frigate. This meant enlarging her bridge, giving her an enclosed quarterdeck with two new Squid anti-submarine mortars within and was given a flush-decked appearance aft. She was recommissioned 7 December 1954 with pennant 317 into the RCN and served primarily on the east coast. In 1961, the frigate was a member of the Ninth Canadian Escort Squadron. She was paid off 15 May 1965 and broken up at La Spezia, Italy in 1966.

== See also ==
- List of ships of the Canadian Navy

== Sources ==
- Arbuckle, J. Graeme (1987). Badges of the Canadian Navy. Halifax, Nova Scotia: Nimbus Publishing. ISBN 0-920852-49-1.
