= HMCS St. Stephen =

River-class frigate of the Royal Canadian Navy during WW2

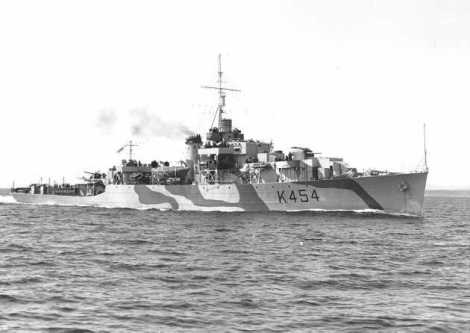
- HMCS St. Stephen

History

Canada
- Name: St. Stephen
- Namesake: St. Stephen, New Brunswick
- Ordered: 1 February 1943
- Builder: Yarrows Ltd., Esquimalt
- Laid down: 5 October 1943
- Launched: 6 February 1944
- Commissioned: 28 July 1944
- Decommissioned: 30 January 1946
- Identification: pennant number: K 454
- Motto: Faeste befongen ("Seized fast")
- Honours and awards: Atlantic 1944-45
- Fate: Transferred to Department of Transport as weather ship 31 August 1950
- Badge: Azure, a cross, couped, argent, in a sunburst or, and charged with a five stones, sable.

General characteristics
- Class & type: River-class frigate
- Displacement: 1,445 long tons (1,468 t; 1,618 short tons); 2,110 long tons (2,140 t; 2,360 short tons) (deep load)
- Length: 283 ft (86.26 m) p/p; 301.25 ft (91.82 m) o/a
- Beam: 36.5 ft (11.13 m)
- Draught: 9 ft (2.74 m); 13 ft (3.96 m) (deep load)
- Propulsion: 2 x Admiralty 3-drum boilers, 2 shafts, reciprocating vertical triple expansion, 5,500 ihp (4,100 kW)
- Speed: 20 knots (37.0 km/h); 20.5 knots (38.0 km/h) (turbine ships)
- Range: 646 long tons (656 t; 724 short tons) oil fuel; 7,500 nautical miles (13,890 km) at 15 knots (27.8 km/h)
- Complement: 157
- Armament: 2 × QF 4 in (102 mm)/45 Mk. XVI on twin mount HA/LA Mk.XIX; 1 × QF 12 pdr (3 in (76 mm)) 12 cwt /40 Mk. V on mounting HA/LA Mk.IX (not all ships); 8 × 20 mm QF Oerlikon A/A on twin mounts Mk.V; 1 × Hedgehog 24 spigot A/S projector; up to 150 depth charges

HMCS St. Stephen was a River-class frigate that served with the Royal Canadian Navy during the Second World War. She served primarily as a convoy escort in the Battle of the Atlantic. She was named for St. Stephen, New Brunswick.

St. Stephen was ordered on 1 February 1943 as part of the 1943–1944 River-class building program. She was laid down on 5 October 1943 by Yarrows Ltd. at Esquimalt and launched 6 February 1944. She was commissioned into the Royal Canadian Navy on 28 July 1944 at Esquimalt.

== Background ==
The River-class frigate was designed by William Reed of Smith's Dock Company of South Bank-on-Tees. Originally called a "twin-screw corvette", its purpose was to improve on the convoy escort classes in service with the Royal Navy at the time, including the Flower-class corvette. The first orders were placed by the Royal Navy in 1940 and the vessels were named for rivers in the United Kingdom, giving name to the class. In Canada they were named for towns and cities though they kept the same designation. The name "frigate" was suggested by Vice-Admiral Percy Nelles of the Royal Canadian Navy and was adopted later that year.

Improvements over the corvette design included improved accommodation which was markedly better. The twin engines gave only three more knots of speed but extended the range of the ship to nearly double that of a corvette at 7,200 nautical miles (13,300 km) at 12 knots. Among other lessons applied to the design was an armament package better designed to combat U-boats including a twin 4-inch mount forward and a 12-pounder aft. 15 Canadian frigates were initially fitted with a single 4-inch gun forward but with the exception of HMCS Valleyfield, they were all eventually upgraded to the double mount. For underwater targets, the River-class frigate was equipped with a Hedgehog anti-submarine mortar and depth charge rails aft and four side-mounted throwers.

River-class frigates were the first Royal Canadian Navy warships to carry the 147B Sword horizontal fan echo sonar transmitter in addition to the irregular ASDIC. This allowed the ship to maintain contact with targets even while firing unless a target was struck. Improved radar and direction-finding equipment improved the RCN's ability to find and track enemy submarines over the previous classes.

Canada originally ordered the construction of 33 frigates in October 1941. The design was too big for the shipyards on the Great Lakes so all the frigates built in Canada were built in dockyards along the west coast or along the St. Lawrence River. In all Canada ordered the construction of 60 frigates including ten for the Royal Navy that transferred two to the United States Navy.

== Service history ==
After working up in Bermuda in October 1944, St. Stephen was allocated to the Mid-Ocean Escort Force escort group C-5. She spent the better part of her service as a trans-Atlantic convoy escort. She returned to Canada in June 1945 to undergo a tropicalization refit at Dartmouth for possible service in the southern Pacific Ocean. This meant adding refrigeration and water-cooling capabilities and changing the camouflage. The refit was cancelled in August 1945 due to the surrender of Japan. St. Stephen was paid off 30 January 1946 at Halifax and laid up in Bedford Basin.

=== Postwar service ===
After the war, St. Stephen was refit and recommissioned into the Royal Canadian Navy as a weather ship on 27 September 1947. She spent the next three years at weather station 4YB (Station "Baker") between Labrador and Greenland, on rotation with an American ship. During heavy weather an experiment was made jury rigging a steadying sail; her XO reported years later 'it worked well for a few seconds, but then we lost it and everything it was made fast to'.

In August 1950 she sailed to Esquimalt where she was paid off on 31 August 1950 and lent to the Department of Transport. The Department of Transport had just acquired and altered two other River-class frigates, Stone Town and St. Catharines, to place on station in the Pacific as weather ships. St. Stephen was held in harbour as a spare, in case either of the other two required replacement. In 1955 she was refit to look like other weather ships in service with the Department of Transport but remained in reserve in Victoria. She was purchased outright in 1958 by the Department of Transport and remained in service for another ten years. In 1969 she was sold for mercantile use, for use as a fish factory ship.
