= HMCS Outremont =

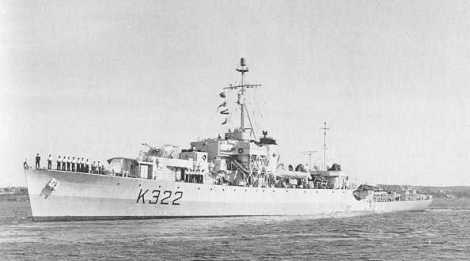
- HMCS Outremont

History

Canada
- Name: Outremont
- Namesake: Outremont, Quebec
- Ordered: October 1941
- Builder: Morton Engineering & Dry Dock Co., Quebec City
- Laid down: 18 November 1942
- Launched: 3 July 1943
- Commissioned: 27 November 1943
- Decommissioned: 5 November 1945
- Identification: pennant number: K 322
- Recommissioned: 2 December 1955
- Decommissioned: 7 June 1965
- Reclassified: Prestonian-class frigate 1955
- Identification: pennant number: FFE 310
- Motto: "Proud to serve"
- Honours and awards: Atlantic 1944, Arctic 1944, Normandy 1944
- Fate: Sold, scrapped 1966
- Badge: Party per chevron or and vert, in chief surmounting the peak of the chevron an ancient crown gules and in base a peacock in his pride, or

General characteristics
- Class & type: River-class frigate
- Displacement: 1,445 long tons (1,468 t; 1,618 short tons); 2,110 long tons (2,140 t; 2,360 short tons) (deep load)
- Length: 283 ft (86.26 m) p/p; 301.25 ft (91.82 m)o/a
- Beam: 36.5 ft (11.13 m)
- Draught: 9 ft (2.74 m); 13 ft (3.96 m) (deep load)
- Propulsion: 2 x Admiralty 3-drum boilers, 2 shafts, reciprocating vertical triple expansion, 5,500 ihp (4,100 kW)
- Speed: 20 knots (37.0 km/h); 20.5 knots (38.0 km/h) (turbine ships)
- Range: 646 long tons (656 t; 724 short tons) oil fuel; 7,500 nautical miles (13,890 km) at 15 knots (27.8 km/h)
- Complement: 157
- Armament: 2 × QF 4 in (102 mm)/45 Mk. XVI on twin mount HA/LA Mk.XIX; 1 × QF 12 pdr (3 in (76 mm)) 12 cwt /40 Mk. V on mounting HA/LA Mk.IX (not all ships); 8 × 20 mm QF Oerlikon A/A on twin mounts Mk.V; 1 × Hedgehog 24 spigot A/S projector; up to 150 depth charges

HMCS Outremont was a River-class frigate that served with the Royal Canadian Navy during the Second World War and again from 1955–1965 as a Prestonian-class frigate. During the war she served primarily as a convoy escort. She was named for Outremont, Quebec.

Outremont was ordered in October 1941 as part of the 1942–1943 River-class building program. She was laid down on 18 November 1942 by Morton Engineering & Dry Dock Co. at Quebec City and launched 3 July 1943. She was commissioned into the Royal Canadian Navy on 27 November 1943 at Quebec City.

== Background ==
The River-class frigate was designed by William Reed of Smith's Dock Company of South Bank-on-Tees. Originally called a "twin-screw corvette", its purpose was to improve on the convoy escort classes in service with the Royal Navy at the time, including the Flower-class corvette. The first orders were placed by the Royal Navy in 1940 and the vessels were named for rivers in the United Kingdom, giving name to the class. In Canada they were named for towns and cities though they kept the same designation. The name "frigate" was suggested by Vice-Admiral Percy Nelles of the Royal Canadian Navy and was adopted later that year.

Improvements over the corvette design included improved accommodation which was markedly better. The twin engines gave only three more knots of speed but extended the range of the ship to nearly double that of a corvette at 7,200 nautical miles (13,300 km) at 12 knots. Among other lessons applied to the design was an armament package better designed to combat U-boats including a twin 4-inch mount forward and 12-pounder aft. 15 Canadian frigates were initially fitted with a single 4-inch gun forward but with the exception of HMCS Valleyfield, they were all eventually upgraded to the double mount. For underwater targets, the River-class frigate was equipped with a Hedgehog anti-submarine mortar and depth charge rails aft and four side-mounted throwers.

River-class frigates were the first Royal Canadian Navy warships to carry the 147B Sword horizontal fan echo sonar transmitter in addition to the irregular ASDIC. This allowed the ship to maintain contact with targets even while firing unless a target was struck. Improved radar and direction-finding equipment improved the RCN's ability to find and track enemy submarines over the previous classes.

Canada originally ordered the construction of 33 frigates in October 1941. The design was too big for the shipyards on the Great Lakes so all the frigates built in Canada were built in dockyards along the west coast or along the St. Lawrence River. In all Canada ordered the construction of 60 frigates including ten for the Royal Navy that transferred two to the United States Navy.

== Service history ==
After working up in St. Margaret's Bay, Outremont was assigned to escort group EG 6 based out of Derry. Upon arrival she performed local escort and anti-submarine duties in United Kingdom waters. She was present on D-day as part of Operation Neptune, the naval component of the Invasion of Normandy. Her task as part of EG 6 was to protect the invasion fleet from attack by submarine. On 10 June, while escorting the aircraft carrier HMS Tracker, HMCS Teme was severely damaged in a collision with the escort carrier and Outremont took the crippled ship in tow.

Outremont returned to Canada in December 1944 to undergo a tropicalization refit at Sydney in preparation for service in the southern Pacific Ocean. She returned to service on 20 August 1945 only to be paid off 5 November.

=== Postwar service ===
Outremont was sold to Marine Industries after the war. She was later repurchased by the Royal Canadian Navy for conversion to a Prestonian-class frigate. This meant a flush-decked appearance aft, with a larger bridge and taller funnel. Her hull forward was strengthened against ice and the quarterdeck was enclosed to contain two Squid anti-submarine mortars. She was recommissioned on 2 September 1955 at Saint John with the pennant 310. Her crew came from sister ship Penetang, which had been paid off the same day. Outremont deployed to the Caribbean Sea in May–June 1956 for training exercises with the destroyer Nootka and two United States Navy submarines.

She served in a training capacity with the Seventh Canadian Escort Squadron. In June 1960, the frigate began a tour of the Great Lakes and Saint Lawrence Seaway, making several port visits. She was paid off on 7 June 1965. She was sold for scrap and broken up at La Spezia, Italy in 1966.
