= HMCS Prestonian =

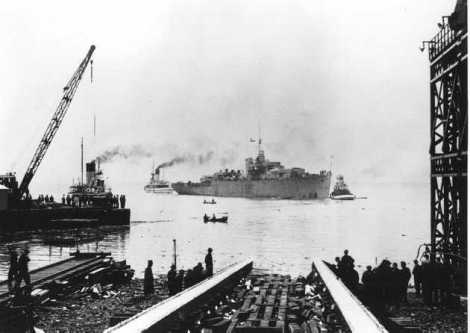
- HMCS Prestonian at launch

History

Canada
- Name: Prestonian
- Namesake: Preston, Ontario
- Ordered: 1 February 1943
- Builder: Davie Shipbuilding, Lauzon
- Laid down: 20 July 1943
- Launched: 22 June 1944
- Commissioned: 13 September 1944
- Decommissioned: 9 November 1945
- Identification: pennant number: K 662
- Recommissioned: 22 August 1953
- Decommissioned: 24 April 1956
- Reclassified: Prestonian-class frigate 1953
- Identification: pennant number: FFE 307
- Fate: Loaned to Norway 1956, sold outright 1959.
- Badge: Gules, four tridents, argent, one pointing to the chief, one to the base, one to the dexter and one to the sinister and over all a roundel barry wavy argent two dexter hands conjoined proper

Norway
- Name: Troll
- Namesake: The Norse mythological creature Troll
- Acquired: loaned 24 April 1956; purchased 1959
- Commissioned: 1956
- Decommissioned: 1972
- Renamed: Horten (1965)
- Reclassified: submarine depot ship (1965)
- Identification: F314 as Troll
- Fate: Scrapped 1972

General characteristics
- Class & type: River-class frigate
- Displacement: 1,445 long tons (1,468 t; 1,618 short tons); 2,110 long tons (2,140 t; 2,360 short tons) (deep load)
- Length: 283 ft (86.26 m) p/p; 301.25 ft (91.82 m)o/a
- Beam: 36.5 ft (11.13 m)
- Draught: 9 ft (2.74 m); 13 ft (3.96 m) (deep load)
- Propulsion: 2 x Admiralty 3-drum boilers, 2 shafts, reciprocating vertical triple expansion, 5,500 ihp (4,100 kW)
- Speed: 20 knots (37.0 km/h); 20.5 knots (38.0 km/h) (turbine ships)
- Range: 646 long tons (656 t; 724 short tons) oil fuel; 7,500 nautical miles (13,890 km) at 15 knots (27.8 km/h)
- Complement: 157
- Armament: 2 × QF 4 in (102 mm)/45 Mk. XVI on twin mount HA/LA Mk.XIX; 8 × 20 mm QF Oerlikon A/A on twin mounts Mk.V; 1 × Hedgehog 24 spigot A/S projector; up to 150 depth charges

HMCS Prestonian was a River-class frigate that served with the Royal Canadian Navy during the Second World War and as a Prestonian-class frigate from 1953–1956. She saw action primarily as a convoy escort. She was named for Preston, Ontario, however due to possible confusion with USS Preston, her name was altered. In 1956 she began service with the Royal Norwegian Navy as Troll.

Prestonian was ordered on 1 February 1943 as part of the 1943–1944 River-class building program. She was laid down as Beauharnois on 20 July 1943 by Davie Shipbuilding and Repairing Co. Ltd. at Lauzon, Quebec and launched 22 June 1944. Her name was changed to Prestonian and she was commissioned on 13 September 1944 at Quebec City.

== Background ==
The River-class frigate was designed by William Reed of Smith's Dock Company of South Bank-on-Tees. Originally called a "twin-screw corvette", its purpose was to improve on the convoy escort classes in service with the Royal Navy at the time, including the Flower-class corvette. The first orders were placed by the Royal Navy in 1940 and the vessels were named for rivers in the United Kingdom, giving name to the class. In Canada they were named after towns and cities though they kept the same designation. The name "frigate" was suggested by Vice-Admiral Percy Nelles of the Royal Canadian Navy and was adopted later that year.

Improvements over the corvette design included improved accommodation which was markedly better. The twin engines gave only three more knots of speed but extended the range of the ship to nearly double that of a corvette at 7,200 nautical miles (13,300 km) at 12 knots. Among other lessons applied to the design was an armament package better designed to combat U-boats including a twin 4-inch mount forward and 12-pounder aft. 15 Canadian frigates were initially fitted with a single 4-inch gun forward but with the exception of HMCS Valleyfield, they were all eventually upgraded to the double mount. For underwater targets, the River-class frigate was equipped with a Hedgehog anti-submarine mortar and depth charge rails aft and four side-mounted throwers.

River-class frigates were the first Royal Canadian Navy warships to carry the 147B Sword horizontal fan echo sonar transmitter in addition to the irregular ASDIC. This allowed the ship to maintain contact with targets even while firing unless a target was struck. Improved radar and direction-finding equipment improved the RCN's ability to find and track enemy submarines over the previous classes.

Canada originally ordered the construction of 33 frigates in October 1941. The design was too big for the shipyards on the Great Lakes so all the frigates built in Canada were built in dockyards along the west coast or along the St. Lawrence River. In all Canada ordered the construction of 60 frigates including ten for the Royal Navy that transferred two to the United States Navy.

== Service history ==
Due to her late entry into the Second World War, Prestonian did not see much action. Upon arriving at Halifax, she underwent major repairs and it was not until January 1945 that she began working up at Bermuda. After she returned she was assigned to EG 28, a local convoy escort group working out of Halifax. She remained with this unit until the end of the war in Europe. In preparation for service in the Pacific Ocean, Prestonian began a tropicalization refit at Halifax completing on 20 August 1945. However the plans to send her to the Pacific had been cancelled and she was paid off 9 November and sold to Marine Industries Ltd.

Prestonian was reacquired by the RCN to undergo conversion to a Prestonian-class ocean escort as part of the need to expand the anti-submarine force within the navy. This meant a flush-decked appearance aft, with a larger bridge and taller funnel. Her hull forward was strengthened against ice and the quarterdeck was enclosed to contain two Squid anti-submarine mortars. As the first ship to complete the conversion, she gave her name to the new class. In August 1953, Prestonian underwent builder's sea trials, testing the conversion before being recommissioned on 22 August 1953 with pennant 307. The frigate was made a part of the First Canadian Escort Squadron in November 1953. In April 1954, the First Canadian Escort Squadron deployed to Caribbean Sea for a training cruise, making several port visits. In September, the First Canadian Escort Squadron took part in the NATO naval exercise "New Broom II" and in October, the exercise "Morning Mist" before performing a two-month training cruise in the Mediterranean Sea, making several port visits. The squadron returned to Canada on 10 December 1954.

=== Royal Norwegian Navy ===
It was announced in November 1955 that three Prestonian-class frigates would be loaned to Norway; Prestonian, Penetang and Toronto. The frigate was paid off on 24 April 1956 and transferred to the Royal Norwegian Navy and renamed HNoMS Troll. She was employed primarily for fishery protection duties. In 1965 she was reclassified as a submarine depot ship and renamed HNoMS Horten. She served in this capacity until 1972 when the ship was discarded. The ship was scrapped in 1972.
