= HMCS Penetang =

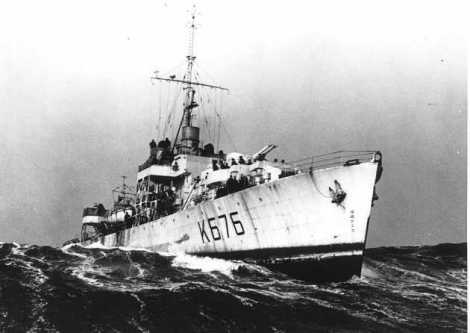
- HMCS Penetang

History

Canada
- Name: Penetang
- Namesake: Penetanguishene, Ontario
- Ordered: June 1942
- Builder: Davie Shipbuilding, Lauzon
- Yard number: 557
- Laid down: 22 September 1943
- Launched: 6 July 1944
- Commissioned: 19 October 1944
- Decommissioned: 10 November 1945
- Identification: Pennant number: K 676
- Recommissioned: 1 June 1954
- Decommissioned: 2 September 1955
- Reclassified: Prestonian-class frigate 1954
- Identification: pennant number: FFE 316
- Honours and awards: Atlantic 1945
- Fate: Loaned to Norway 10 March 1956; sold to Norway 1959
- Notes: Colours:White and blue
- Badge: Azure, an hourglass framed or, with sands argent, the upper cup nearly full.

Norway
- Name: Draug
- Namesake: The sea revenant Draugr
- Acquired: loaned 10 March 1956; purchased 1959
- Commissioned: 1956
- Decommissioned: 1966
- Identification: (as Draug) F313
- Fate: Sold for scrapping 1966

General characteristics
- Class & type: River-class frigate
- Displacement: 1,445 long tons (1,468 t; 1,618 short tons); 2,110 long tons (2,140 t; 2,360 short tons) (deep load)
- Length: 283 ft (86.26 m) p/p; 301.25 ft (91.82 m)o/a
- Beam: 36.5 ft (11.13 m)
- Draught: 9 ft (2.74 m); 13 ft (3.96 m) (deep load)
- Propulsion: 2 × Admiralty 3-drum boilers, 2 shafts, reciprocating vertical triple expansion, 5,500 ihp (4,100 kW)
- Speed: 20 knots (37.0 km/h); 20.5 knots (38.0 km/h) (turbine ships)
- Range: 646 long tons (656 t; 724 short tons) oil fuel; 7,500 nautical miles (13,890 km) at 15 knots (27.8 km/h)
- Complement: 157
- Armament: 2 × QF 4 in (102 mm)/45 Mk. XVI on twin mount HA/LA Mk.XIX; 8 × 20 mm QF Oerlikon A/A on twin mounts Mk.V; 1 × Hedgehog 24 spigot A/S projector; up to 150 depth charges

HMCS Penetang was a River-class frigate that served in the Royal Canadian Navy from 1944 to 1945 during the Second World War. She fought in the Battle of the Atlantic as a convoy escort. She was recommissioned and served as a Prestonian-class frigate from 1954 to 1956. She was named for Penetanguishene, Ontario.

Penetang was ordered in June 1942 as part of the 1942 River-class building programme. She was laid down as Rouyn on 22 September 1943 by Davie Shipbuilding & Repairing Co. Ltd. at Lauzon and launched 6 July 1944. Her name was changed and she was commissioned as Penetang into the RCN at Quebec City on 19 October 1944 with the pennant K676.

== Background ==
The River-class frigate was designed by William Reed of Smith's Dock Company of South Bank-on-Tees. Originally called a "twin-screw corvette", its purpose was to improve on the convoy escort classes in service with the Royal Navy at the time, including the Flower-class corvette. The first orders were placed by the Royal Navy in 1940 and the vessels were named for rivers in the United Kingdom, giving name to the class. In Canada they were named for towns and cities though they kept the same designation. The name "frigate" was suggested by Vice-Admiral Percy Nelles of the Royal Canadian Navy and was adopted later that year.

Improvements over the corvette design included improved accommodation which was markedly better. The twin engines gave only three more knots of speed but extended the range of the ship to nearly double that of a corvette at 7,200 nautical miles (13,300 km) at 12 knots. Among other lessons applied to the design was an armament package better designed to combat U-boats including a twin 4-inch mount forward and 12-pounder aft. 15 Canadian frigates were initially fitted with a single 4-inch gun forward but with the exception of HMCS Valleyfield, they were all eventually upgraded to the double mount. For underwater targets, the River-class frigate was equipped with a Hedgehog anti-submarine mortar and depth charge rails aft and four side-mounted throwers.

River-class frigates were the first Royal Canadian Navy warships to carry the 147B Sword horizontal fan echo sonar transmitter in addition to the irregular ASDIC. This allowed the ship to maintain contact with targets even while firing unless a target was struck. Improved radar and direction-finding equipment improved the RCN's ability to find and track enemy submarines over the previous classes.

Canada originally ordered the construction of 33 frigates in October 1941. The design was too big for the shipyards on the Great Lakes so all the frigates built in Canada were built in dockyards along the west coast or along the St. Lawrence River. In all Canada ordered the construction of 60 frigates including ten for the Royal Navy that transferred two to the United States Navy.

== Service history ==
After working up in Bermuda in November 1944, Penetang was assigned to Escort Group 9 of the Mid-Ocean Escort Force (MOEF) as a convoy escort on trans-Atlantic supply convoys. She served the remainder of the war with the group, returning to Canada in June 1945. Upon the end of hostilities in Europe, Penetang was used as a troop-carrier between St. John's and Quebec City. She was one of the few new River-class frigates not to be sent for a tropicalization refit. She was paid off into the reserve at Shelburne, Nova Scotia on 10 November 1945. In December 1945 she was sold to Marine Industries Ltd.

Penetang was chosen as one of the River-class frigates to undergo conversion to a Prestonian-class frigate. She was reacquired from Marine Industries Ltd. and underwent conversion in 1953–1954 at George T. Davie and Sons shipyard at Lauzon, Quebec. She was recommissioned there with pennant 316 on 1 June 1954. Following her reentry into service, Penetang was assigned to the First Canadian Escort Squadron. She remained in service until 2 September 1955, when she was paid off again at Saint John, New Brunswick, with her crew reassigned to Outremont, which recommissioned the same day.

=== Royal Norwegian Navy ===
It was announced in November 1955 that three Prestonian-class frigates would be loaned to Norway; Penetang, Prestonian and Toronto. Penetang was transferred to the Royal Norwegian Navy on 10 March 1956 where she was renamed HNoMS Draug, after the revenant Draugr from folklore. Draug was purchased outright in 1959 and served with the Norwegian navy employed on fishery protection duties. She served with the Norwegian navy until she was decommissioned and scrapped in 1966.

== See also ==
- List of current ships of the Royal Canadian Navy
- List of Royal Norwegian Navy ships
