= HMCS Granby =

Several units of the Royal Canadian Navy have been named HMCS Granby.

- HMCS Granby (J264), a Bangor-class minesweeper that served during the Second World War and in the Cold War, given the new pennant number FSE 180.
- HMCS Granby (FSE 180), the former Prestonian-class frigate Victoriaville which assumed the name and duties of the first Granby.

== Battle honours ==
- Atlantic, 1942–44
