= HMCS Fort Erie =

1944 River-class frigate

History

Canada
- Name: Fort Erie
- Namesake: Fort Erie, Ontario
- Ordered: June 1942
- Builder: Davie Shipbuilding, Lauzon
- Laid down: 3 November 1943
- Launched: 27 May 1944
- Commissioned: 27 October 1944
- Decommissioned: 22 November 1945
- Identification: Pennant number: K670
- Recommissioned: 17 April 1956
- Decommissioned: 26 March 1965
- Reclassified: Prestonian-class frigate
- Identification: pennant number: FFE 312
- Fate: Sold for scrap, broken up La Spezia, Italy 1966
- Notes: Colours:Red and Black
- Badge: Argent, out of a mural crown sable, a demi cat rampant guardant gules armed azure, collared and chained or, holding erect a trident azure, the base end resting on the mural crown.

General characteristics
- Class & type: River-class frigate
- Displacement: 1,445 long tons (1,468 t; 1,618 short tons); 2,110 long tons (2,140 t; 2,360 short tons) (deep load)
- Length: 283 ft (86.26 m) p/p; 301.25 ft (91.82 m)o/a
- Beam: 36.5 ft (11.13 m)
- Draught: 9 ft (2.74 m); 13 ft (3.96 m) (deep load)
- Propulsion: 2 × Admiralty 3-drum boilers, 2 shafts, reciprocating vertical triple expansion, 5,500 ihp (4,100 kW)
- Speed: 20 knots (37.0 km/h); 20.5 knots (38.0 km/h) (turbine ships)
- Range: 646 long tons (656 t; 724 short tons) oil fuel; 7,500 nautical miles (13,890 km) at 15 knots (27.8 km/h)
- Complement: 157
- Armament: 2 × QF 4 in (102 mm)/45 Mk. XVI on twin mount HA/LA Mk.XIX; 8 × 20 mm QF Oerlikon A/A on twin mounts Mk.V; 1 × Hedgehog 24 spigot A/S projector; up to 150 depth charges

HMCS Fort Erie was a River-class frigate that served in the Royal Canadian Navy during the Second World War and as a Prestonian-class frigate from 1956 to 1965. She was named for Fort Erie, Ontario.

Fort Erie was ordered in June 1942 as part of the 1943-1944 building program. She was laid down as La Tuque on 3 November 1943 by G T Davie Shipbuilding Ltd. at Lauzon and launched 27 May 1944. Her name was changed and she was commissioned as Fort Erie at Quebec City on 27 October 1944 with the pennant K670.

== Background ==
The River-class frigate was designed by William Reed of Smith's Dock Company of South Bank-on-Tees. Originally called a "twin-screw corvette", its purpose was to improve on the convoy escort classes in service with the Royal Navy at the time, including the Flower-class corvette. The first orders were placed by the Royal Navy in 1940 and the vessels were named for rivers in the United Kingdom, giving name to the class. In Canada they were named after towns and cities though they kept the same designation. The name "frigate" was suggested by Vice-Admiral Percy Nelles of the Royal Canadian Navy and was adopted later that year.

Improvements over the corvette design included improved accommodation which was markedly better. The twin engines gave only three more knots of speed but extended the range of the ship to nearly double that of a corvette at 7,200 nautical miles (13,300 km) at 12 knots. Among other lessons applied to the design was an armament package better designed to combat U-boats including a twin 4-inch mount forward and 12-pounder aft. 15 Canadian frigates were initially fitted with a single 4-inch gun forward but with the exception of HMCS Valleyfield, they were all eventually upgraded to the double mount. For underwater targets, the River-class frigate was equipped with a Hedgehog anti-submarine mortar and depth charge rails aft and four side-mounted throwers.

River-class frigates were the first Royal Canadian Navy warships to carry the 147B Sword horizontal fan echo sonar transmitter in addition to the irregular ASDIC. This allowed the ship to maintain contact with targets even while firing unless a target was struck. Improved radar and direction-finding equipment improved the RCN's ability to find and track enemy submarines over the previous classes.

Canada originally ordered the construction of 33 frigates in October 1941. The design was too big for the shipyards on the Great Lakes so all the frigates built in Canada were built in dockyards along the west coast or along the St. Lawrence River. In all Canada ordered the construction of 60 frigates including ten for the Royal Navy that transferred two to the United States Navy.

== Service history ==
After working up in Bermuda, Fort Erie was assigned to escort group EG 28 which operated out of Halifax, Nova Scotia, a support group that would aid any convoy under attack. She remained with that unit for the entire war. On 2 June 1945, Fort Erie began a tropicalization refit in preparation for service in the Pacific Ocean. However, in August 1945, that was cancelled and she was paid off into the reserve 22 November, and laid up at Shelburne, Nova Scotia.

In 1946, she was sold to Marine Industries Ltd. Fort Erie was among the River-class frigates reacquired by the RCN when the need for more anti-submarine forces were required for combating the increased Soviet submarine threat. She underwent conversion to a Prestonian-class frigate from 1953 to 1955 and was recommissioned with pennant 312 on 17 April 1956. As a member of the Seventh Canadian Escort Squadron, she served primarily as a training ship. In March 1961, Fort Erie was among the ships that took part in a combined naval exercise with the United States Navy off Nova Scotia. The ship was paid off on 26 March 1965 and was sold for scrap and broken up at La Spezia, Italy, in 1966.

== See also ==
- List of ships of the Canadian Navy
