= HMCS Inch Arran =

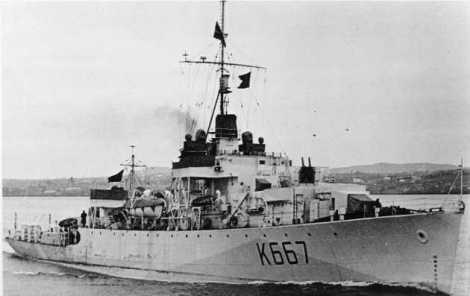
- HMCS Inch Arran (K667)

History

Canada
- Name: Inch Arran
- Namesake: Inch Arran Point, Dalhousie, New Brunswick
- Ordered: 1 February 1943
- Builder: Davie Shipbuilding, Lauzon
- Laid down: 25 October 1943
- Launched: 6 June 1944
- Commissioned: 18 November 1944
- Decommissioned: 28 November 1945
- Identification: Pennant number: K667
- Recommissioned: 23 August 1954
- Decommissioned: 23 June 1965
- Reclassified: Prestonian-class frigate
- Identification: pennant number: FFE 308
- Fate: Sold, broken up 1970
- Badge: On a field barry wavy of eighteen pieces argent and azure, a roundel or displaying a saltire gules charged in the center with a lymphad with four oars sable, sail argent, flags or

General characteristics
- Class & type: River-class frigate
- Displacement: 1445 tons
- Length: 301.5 ft (91.90 m) o/a
- Beam: 36.6 ft (11.16 m)
- Draught: 9 ft (2.74 m); 13 ft (3.96 m) (deep load)
- Installed power: 5,500 hp (4,100 kW)
- Propulsion: 2 × Admiralty boilers
- Speed: 20 knots (37.0 km/h)
- Range: 7,200 nautical miles (13,334 km) at 11 knots (20.4 km/h)
- Complement: 8 officers and 133 crew
- Armament: 2 × QF 4 in (102 mm) /40 Mk.XIX guns; 10 × 20 mm anti-aircraft guns (2×2, 6×1); 1 × Hedgehog; 2 × Depth charge racks

HMCS Inch Arran was a River-class frigate that served with the Royal Canadian Navy during the Second World War and again from 1954 to 1965, when she was converted into a Prestonian-class frigate. She was named after Inch Arran Point in Dalhousie, New Brunswick, Canada. This was due to the inability of two Allied warships to bear the same name. The RCN would then use landmarks or significant areas that were associated with the community instead.

Inch Arran was ordered 1 February 1943 as part of the 1943–44 River-class building program. She was laid down on 25 October 1943 by Davie Shipbuilding and Repairing Co. Ltd. at Lauzon, Quebec, and launched on 6 June 1944. She was commissioned on 18 November 1944 at Quebec City with the pennant number K667.

== Background ==
The River-class frigate was designed by William Reed of Smith's Dock Company of South Bank-on-Tees. Originally called a "twin-screw corvette", its purpose was to improve on the convoy escort classes in service with the Royal Navy at the time, including the Flower-class corvette. The first orders were placed by the Royal Navy in 1940 and the vessels were named for rivers in the United Kingdom, giving name to the class. In Canada they were named after towns and cities though they kept the same designation. The name "frigate" was suggested by Vice-Admiral Percy Nelles of the Royal Canadian Navy and was adopted later that year.

Improvements over the corvette design included improved accommodation which was markedly better. The twin engines gave only three more knots of speed but extended the range of the ship to nearly double that of a corvette at 7,200 nautical miles (13,300 km) at 12 knots. Among other lessons applied to the design was an armament package better designed to combat U-boats including a twin 4-inch mount forward and 12-pounder aft. Fifteen Canadian frigates were initially fitted with a single 4-inch gun forward, but with the exception of HMCS Valleyfield, they were all eventually upgraded to the double mount. For underwater targets, the River-class frigate was equipped with a Hedgehog anti-submarine mortar and depth charge rails aft and four side-mounted throwers.

River-class frigates were the first Royal Canadian Navy warships to carry the 147B Sword horizontal fan echo sonar transmitter in addition to the irregular ASDIC. This allowed the ship to maintain contact with targets even while firing unless a target was struck. Improved radar and direction-finding equipment improved the RCN's ability to find and track enemy submarines over the previous classes.

Canada originally ordered the construction of 33 frigates in October 1941. The design was too big for the shipyards on the Great Lakes, so all the frigates built in Canada were built in dockyards along the west coast or along the St. Lawrence River. In all, Canada ordered the construction of 60 frigates, including ten for the Royal Navy that transferred two to the United States Navy.

== Service history ==
In January 1945, Inch Arran worked up at Bermuda and was assigned to escort group 28 upon her return in February. The ship spent the remainder of the Second World War on patrol and escort duties in Halifax. The most notable escort duty was alongside HMCS Buckingham on 13 May 1945 approximately 140 miles (225 km) south-southeast of Sable Island, Nova Scotia. Here both vessels escorted the surrendered German submarine U-889 back to harbor. Before any of the three vessels were granted entry through the anti-submarine gates of Shelburne Harbor, U-889 was boarded and thoroughly inspected. On 6 June 1945, Inch Arran began a tropicalization refit in preparation for service in the Pacific Ocean. This was suspended on 20 August due to the Surrender of Japan, and she was paid off on 28 November 1945.

=== Postwar service ===
Inch Arran was sold to Marine Industries Ltd. in 1946, but was reacquired by the RCN in 1951 as one of the ships chosen to undergo conversion to a Prestonian-class ocean escort. She underwent the conversion at Saint John, New Brunswick, which involved a flush-decked appearance, with a larger bridge and taller funnel. Her hull forward was strengthened against ice and the quarterdeck was enclosed to contain two Squid anti-submarine mortars. She was recommissioned with the pennant number 308 on 23 August 1954. The frigate was assigned to the Seventh Canadian Escort Squadron. In March 1961, Inch Arran was among the ships that took part in a combined naval exercise with the United States Navy off Nova Scotia. During the Cuban Missile Crisis, Canadian aircraft located the Soviet intelligence trawler Shkval about 500 miles (805 km) southwest of Argentia. Inch Arran was ordered to shadow the vessel. She served as a training ship on the east coast before paid off 23 June 1965. Inch Arran was sold for conversion into a museum and youth club; this did not happen, and she was ultimately scrapped in 1970.

== See also ==
- List of ships of the Canadian Navy
