= HMCS New Waterford =

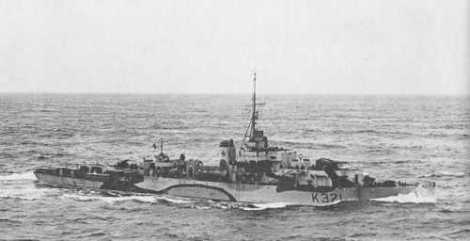
- HMCS New Waterford

History

Canada
- Name: New Waterford
- Namesake: New Waterford, Nova Scotia
- Ordered: June 1942
- Builder: Yarrows, Esquimalt
- Laid down: 17 February 1943
- Launched: 3 July 1943
- Commissioned: 21 January 1944
- Decommissioned: 7 March 1946
- Identification: pennant number: K 321
- Recommissioned: 31 January 1958
- Decommissioned: 2 December 1966
- Reclassified: Prestonian-class frigate 1958
- Identification: pennant number: FFE 304
- Motto: "Nulli secundis" (Second to none)
- Honours and awards: Atlantic 1944
- Fate: Sold, scrapped 1967
- Badge: Barry wavy of eight, Argent and Azure, a dolphin hauriant embowed Or

General characteristics
- Class & type: River-class frigate
- Displacement: 1,445 long tons (1,468 t; 1,618 short tons); 2,110 long tons (2,140 t; 2,360 short tons) (deep load)
- Length: 283 ft (86.26 m) p/p; 301.25 ft (91.82 m)o/a
- Beam: 36.5 ft (11.13 m)
- Draught: 9 ft (2.74 m); 13 ft (3.96 m) (deep load)
- Propulsion: 2 x Admiralty 3-drum boilers, 2 shafts, reciprocating vertical triple expansion, 5,500 ihp (4,100 kW)
- Speed: 20 knots (37.0 km/h); 20.5 knots (38.0 km/h) (turbine ships)
- Range: 646 long tons (656 t; 724 short tons) oil fuel; 7,500 nautical miles (13,890 km) at 15 knots (27.8 km/h)
- Complement: 157
- Armament: 2 × QF 4 in (102 mm)/45 Mk. XVI on twin mount HA/LA Mk.XIX; 1 × QF 12 pdr (3 in (76 mm)) 12 cwt /40 Mk. V on mounting HA/LA Mk.IX (not all ships); 8 × 20 mm QF Oerlikon A/A on twin mounts Mk.V; 1 × Hedgehog 24 spigot A/S projector; up to 150 depth charges

HMCS New Waterford was a River-class frigate that served with the Royal Canadian Navy during the Second World War and then again from 1958–1966 as a Prestonian-class frigate. She served primarily in the waters around the United Kingdom as a convoy support escort. She was named for New Waterford, Nova Scotia.

New Waterford was ordered in June 1942 as part of the 1942–1943 River-class building program. She was laid down on 17 February 1943 by Yarrows Ltd. at Esquimalt and launched 3 July 1943. She was commissioned into the Royal Canadian Navy on 21 January 1944 at Victoria, British Columbia.

== Background ==
The River-class frigate was designed by William Reed of Smith's Dock Company of South Bank-on-Tees. Originally called a "twin-screw corvette", its purpose was to improve on the convoy escort classes in service with the Royal Navy at the time, including the Flower-class corvette. The first orders were placed by the Royal Navy in 1940 and the vessels were named for rivers in the United Kingdom, giving name to the class. In Canada they were named for towns and cities though they kept the same designation. The name "frigate" was suggested by Vice-Admiral Percy Nelles of the Royal Canadian Navy and was adopted later that year.

Improvements over the corvette design included improved accommodation which was markedly better. The twin engines gave only three more knots of speed but extended the range of the ship to nearly double that of a corvette at 7,200 nautical miles (13,300 km) at 12 knots. Among other lessons applied to the design was an armament package better designed to combat U-boats including a twin 4-inch mount forward and 12-pounder aft. 15 Canadian frigates were initially fitted with a single 4-inch gun forward but with the exception of HMCS Valleyfield, they were all eventually upgraded to the double mount. For underwater targets, the River-class frigate was equipped with a Hedgehog (weapon)|Hedgehog anti-submarine mortar and depth charge rails aft and four side-mounted throwers.

River-class frigates were the first Royal Canadian Navy warships to carry the 147B Sword horizontal fan echo sonar transmitter in addition to the irregular ASDIC. This allowed the ship to maintain contact with targets even while firing unless a target was struck. Improved radar and direction-finding equipment improved the RCN's ability to find and track enemy submarines over the previous classes.

Canada originally ordered the construction of 33 frigates in October 1941. The design was too big for the shipyards on the Great Lakes so all the frigates built in Canada were built in dockyards along the west coast or along the St. Lawrence River. In all Canada ordered the construction of 60 frigates including ten for the Royal Navy that transferred two to the United States Navy.

== Service history ==
After commissioning, New Waterford transited to Halifax, arriving on 9 March 1944. She then proceeded to work up in Bermuda. Upon her return, New Waterford was assigned to escort group EG 6 to replace the severely damaged HMCS Teme. Arriving towards the end of June 1944, she remained with this group until the end of the war, assigned for short periods to Plymouth and Portsmouth. From 14 March to 20 April 1945, New Waterford, as Senior Officer's Ship, deployed with Escort Group 6 into the English Channel.

In April 1945 she returned to Canada to commence a tropicalization refit in preparation for service in the southern Pacific Ocean. The work, done in Liverpool, Nova Scotia, was completed in November and she departed for the west coast in January 1946. Soon after arrival, she was paid off at Esquimalt on 7 March 1946.

=== Postwar service ===
New Waterford remained out of service until 1953, when she was briefly recommissioned. She was then sent for conversion to a Prestonian-class frigate. This meant a flush-decked appearance aft, with a larger bridge and taller funnel. Her hull forward was strengthened against ice and the quarterdeck was enclosed to contain two Squid anti-submarine mortars. She was recommissioned with pennant number 304 on 31 January 1958. She served with the Seventh Canadian Escort Squadron In March 1961, New Waterford was among the ships that took part in a combined naval exercise with the United States Navy off Nova Scotia. She was paid off for the final time on 22 December 1966. She was sold in 1967 and broken up at Savona, Italy.
