= HMCS Lauzon (K371) =

History

Canada
- Name: Lauzon
- Namesake: Lauzon, Quebec
- Ordered: June 1942
- Builder: Davie Shipbuilding, Lauzon
- Yard number: 26
- Laid down: 2 July 1943
- Launched: 6 October 1944
- Commissioned: 30 August 1944
- Decommissioned: 7 November 1945
- Identification: Pennant number: K 371
- Recommissioned: 12 December 1953
- Decommissioned: 24 May 1963
- Reclassified: Prestonian-class frigate
- Identification: pennant number: FFE 322
- Honours and awards: Atlantic 1944-45
- Fate: Sold, broken up 1964
- Badge: Azure, three serpents embowed biting their tails and interlaced or.

General characteristics
- Class & type: River-class frigate
- Displacement: 1,445 long tons (1,468 t; 1,618 short tons); 2,110 long tons (2,140 t; 2,360 short tons) (deep load)
- Length: 283 ft (86.26 m) p/p; 301.25 ft (91.82 m) o/a
- Beam: 36.5 ft (11.13 m)
- Draught: 9 ft (2.74 m); 13 ft (3.96 m) (deep load)
- Propulsion: 2 × Admiralty 3-drum boilers, 2 shafts, reciprocating vertical triple expansion, 5,500 ihp (4,100 kW)
- Speed: 20 knots (37.0 km/h); 20.5 knots (38.0 km/h) (turbine ships)
- Range: 646 long tons (656 t; 724 short tons) oil fuel; 7,500 nautical miles (13,890 km) at 15 knots (27.8 km/h)
- Complement: 157
- Armament: 2 × single QF 4 in (102 mm) /40 Mk.XIX guns; 1 × QF 12 pdr (3 in (76 mm)) 12 cwt /40 Mk. V on mounting HA/LA Mk.IX (not all ships); 8 × 20 mm QF Oerlikon A/A on twin mounts Mk.V; 1 × Hedgehog 24 spigot A/S projector; up to 150 depth charges

HMCS Lauzon was a River-class frigate that served with the Royal Canadian Navy during the Second World War and again as a Prestonian-class frigate from 1953 to 1963. During the war she served primarily as an ocean escort for convoys. She was named for Lauzon, Quebec.

Lauzon was ordered in June 1942 as part of the 1943-1944 River-class building program. She was laid down as Glace Bay on 2 July 1943 by the George T. Davie Shipyard at Lauzon, Quebec and launched 10 June 1944. Her name was changed and she was commissioned as Lauzon on 30 August 1944 at Quebec City.

== Background ==
The River-class frigate was designed by William Reed of Smith's Dock Company of South Bank-on-Tees. Originally called a "twin-screw corvette", its purpose was to improve on the convoy escort classes in service with the Royal Navy at the time, including the Flower-class corvette. The first orders were placed by the Royal Navy in 1940 and the vessels were named for rivers in the United Kingdom, giving name to the class. In Canada they were named after towns and cities though they kept the same designation. The name "frigate" was suggested by Vice-Admiral Percy Nelles of the Royal Canadian Navy and was adopted later that year.

Improvements over the corvette design included improved accommodation which was markedly better. The twin engines gave only three more knots of speed but extended the range of the ship to nearly double that of a corvette at 7,200 nautical miles (13,300 km) at 12 knots. Among other lessons applied to the design was an armament package better designed to combat U-boats including a twin 4-inch mount forward and 12-pounder aft. 15 Canadian frigates were initially fitted with a single 4-inch gun forward but with the exception of HMCS Valleyfield, they were all eventually upgraded to the double mount. For underwater targets, the River-class frigate was equipped with a Hedgehog anti-submarine mortar and depth charge rails aft and four side-mounted throwers.

River-class frigates were the first Royal Canadian Navy warships to carry the 147B Sword horizontal fan echo sonar transmitter in addition to the irregular ASDIC. This allowed the ship to maintain contact with targets even while firing unless a target was struck. Improved radar and direction-finding equipment improved the RCN's ability to find and track enemy submarines over the previous classes.

Canada originally ordered the construction of 33 frigates in October 1941. The design was too big for the shipyards on the Great Lakes so all the frigates built in Canada were built in dockyards along the west coast or along the St. Lawrence River. In all Canada ordered the construction of 60 frigates including ten for the Royal Navy that transferred two to the United States Navy.

== Service history ==
Lauzon arrived at Halifax in mid-October and in November spent three weeks working up in Bermuda. She arrived at St. John's on 30 November to join the Mid-Ocean Escort Force (MOEF) escort group EG C-6. Lauzon was employed from there on as a trans-Atlantic convoy escort until the end of hostilities in Europe. She returned to Canada in June 1945 and that summer was employed as a troop carrier between St. John's and Quebec City. Following the Surrender of Japan, Lauzon was paid off on 7 November 1945 and laid up in reserve at Shelburne, Nova Scotia.

=== Postwar service ===
Lauzon was purchased in 1946 by Marine Industries Ltd. Due to a belief in an increased threat by Soviet submarines, the RCN reactivated 21 frigates to combat it. The RCN reacquired Lauzon in 1951 for conversion to a Prestonian-class ocean escort. This meant a flush-decked appearance aft, with a larger bridge and taller funnel. Her hull forward was strengthened against ice and the quarterdeck was enclosed to contain two Squid anti-submarine mortars.

Lauzon was recommissioned at Sorel, Quebec on 12 December 1953 with the new pennant 322, and assumed a training role on the east coast. The frigate was made a part of the First Canadian Escort Squadron in December 1953. In April 1954, the First Canadian Escort Squadron deployed to the Caribbean Sea for a training cruise, making several port visits. In September and October, the First Canadian Escort Squadron took part in the NATO naval exercises before performing a two-month training cruise in the Mediterranean Sea, making several port visits. Lauzon did not take part in the NATO exercises, having undergone equipment repairs in the United Kingdom and rejoined the squadron after it had departed for the Mediterranean. The squadron returned to Canada on 10 December 1954.

In 1961, the frigate was a member of the Ninth Canadian Escort Squadron. In June 1961, Lauzon toured the Great Lakes, making several port visits.

She was paid off on 24 May 1963. She was sold the following year to a Toronto buyer and scrapped.
