= HMCS Lanark =

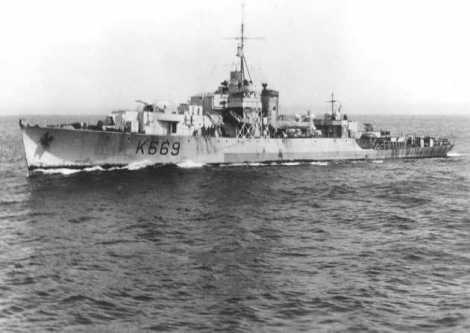
- HMCS Lanark

History

Canada
- Name: Lanark
- Namesake: Lanark, Ontario
- Ordered: June 1942
- Builder: Canadian Vickers, Montreal
- Laid down: 25 September 1943
- Launched: 10 December 1943
- Commissioned: 6 July 1944
- Decommissioned: 24 October 1945
- Identification: Pennant number: K 669
- Recommissioned: 15 April 1956
- Decommissioned: 19 March 1965
- Reclassified: Prestonian-class frigate 1956
- Identification: pennant number: FFE 321
- Honours and awards: Atlantic 1944–45
- Fate: Sold, scrapped 1966
- Badge: Barry wavy of ten argent and azure a bull's head caboshed gules, horns proper

General characteristics
- Class & type: River-class frigate
- Displacement: 1,445 long tons (1,468 t; 1,618 short tons); 2,110 long tons (2,140 t; 2,360 short tons) (deep load)
- Length: 283 ft (86.26 m) p/p; 301.25 ft (91.82 m)o/a
- Beam: 36.5 ft (11.13 m)
- Draught: 9 ft (2.74 m); 13 ft (3.96 m) (deep load)
- Propulsion: 2 x Admiralty 3-drum boilers, 2 shafts, reciprocating vertical triple expansion, 5,500 ihp (4,100 kW)
- Speed: 20 knots (37.0 km/h); 20.5 knots (38.0 km/h) (turbine ships)
- Range: 646 long tons (656 t; 724 short tons) oil fuel; 7,500 nautical miles (13,890 km) at 15 knots (27.8 km/h)
- Complement: 157
- Armament: 2 × QF 4 in (102 mm)/45 Mk. XVI on twin mount HA/LA Mk.XIX; 1 × QF 12 pdr (3 in (76 mm)) 12 cwt /40 Mk. V on mounting HA/LA Mk.IX (not all ships); 8 × 20 mm QF Oerlikon A/A on twin mounts Mk.V; 1 × Hedgehog 24 spigot A/S projector; up to 150 depth charges

HMCS Lanark was a River-class frigate that served with the Royal Canadian Navy during the Second World War and again from 1956–1965 as a Prestonian-class frigate. She fought primarily in the Battle of the Atlantic as a convoy escort. She was named for Lanark, Ontario.

Lanark was ordered in June 1942 as part of the 1942–1943 River-class building program. She was laid down on 25 September 1943 by Canadian Vickers Ltd. at Montreal, Quebec and launched 10 December 1943. She was commissioned into the RCN on 6 July 1944 at Montreal.

== Background ==
The River-class frigate was designed by William Reed of Smith's Dock Company of South Bank-on-Tees. Originally called a "twin-screw corvette", its purpose was to improve on the convoy escort classes in service with the Royal Navy at the time, including the Flower-class corvette. The first orders were placed by the Royal Navy in 1940 and the vessels were named for rivers in the United Kingdom, giving name to the class. In Canada they were named after towns and cities though they kept the same designation. The name "frigate" was suggested by Vice-Admiral Percy Nelles of the Royal Canadian Navy and was adopted later that year.

Improvements over the corvette design included improved accommodation which was markedly better. The twin engines gave only three more knots of speed but extended the range of the ship to nearly double that of a corvette at 7,200 nautical miles (13,300 km) at 12 knots. Among other lessons applied to the design was an armament package better designed to combat U-boats including a twin 4-inch mount forward and 12-pounder aft. 15 Canadian frigates were initially fitted with a single 4-inch gun forward but with the exception of HMCS Valleyfield, they were all eventually upgraded to the double mount. For underwater targets, the River-class frigate was equipped with a Hedgehog anti-submarine mortar and depth charge rails aft and four side-mounted throwers.

River-class frigates were the first Royal Canadian Navy warships to carry the 147B Sword horizontal fan echo sonar transmitter in addition to the irregular ASDIC. This allowed the ship to maintain contact with targets even while firing unless a target was struck. Improved radar and direction-finding equipment improved the RCN's ability to find and track enemy submarines over the previous classes.

Canada originally ordered the construction of 33 frigates in October 1941. The design was too big for the shipyards on the Great Lakes so all the frigates built in Canada were built in dockyards along the west coast or along the St. Lawrence River. In all Canada ordered the construction of 60 frigates including ten for the Royal Navy that transferred two to the United States Navy.

== Service history ==
After working up in Bermuda, Lanark was assigned to the newly formed Mid-Ocean Escort Force escort group C-7 in October 1944. Captained by John Stairs of Montreal. Until June 1945, she served as a trans-Atlantic convoy escort with the group, usually as the Senior Officer's Ship. In June 1945, she returned to Canada, beginning a tropicalization refit in mid-July in preparation for service in the South Pacific Ocean. The refit was cancelled on 31 August 1945 due to the Surrender of Japan and Lanark was paid off at Sydney, Nova Scotia on 24 October.

=== Postwar service ===
Lanark was sold to Marine Industries Ltd. in 1946. In 1954, Lanark was repurchased by the Royal Canadian Navy and sent for conversion to a Prestonian-class frigate. This meant a flush-decked appearance aft, with a larger bridge and taller funnel. Her hull forward was strengthened against ice and the quarterdeck was enclosed to contain two Squid anti-submarine mortars. The conversion was begun in 1954 and completed in 1955. Lanark was re-commissioned into the RCN on 15 April 1956 with the new pennant number 321.

Lanark served mainly on the eastern coast with the Seventh Canadian Escort Squadron as a training ship. On 12 January 1960, Lanark was sent to recover the reserve training ship HMCS Porte Saint Louis off Scatari Island, after the training ship had snapped its tow while en route for a refit at Sydney, Nova Scotia. Lanark took the ship in tow in heavy seas after the ocean-going tugboat Riverton was forced to head for shelter due to the heavy seas. Lanark brought the ship to Sydney, where Riverton took over the tow into the harbour. In May 1960, the frigate began a tour of the Great Lakes and Saint Lawrence Seaway, making several port visits. In March 1961, Lanark was among the ships that took part in a combined naval exercise with the United States Navy off Nova Scotia. She served until 19 March 1965 when she was paid off for the last time. She was sold in 1965 and taken to La Spezia, Italy to be broken up in 1966.
