= HMCS Stettler =

History

Canada
- Name: Stettler
- Namesake: Stettler, Alberta
- Ordered: October 1941
- Builder: Canadian Vickers, Montreal
- Laid down: 31 May 1943
- Launched: 9 October 1943
- Commissioned: 7 May 1944
- Decommissioned: 9 November 1945
- Identification: Pennant number: K 681
- Recommissioned: 2 February 1954
- Decommissioned: 31 August 1966
- Reclassified: Prestonian-class frigate
- Identification: pennant number: FFE 311
- Honours and awards: Gulf of St. Lawrence 1944
- Fate: Sold for scrapping 1966
- Badge: Gules, a cross couped argent charged in the center with a wild rose gules, slipped and leaved vert, barbed and seeded proper, and between the four arms of the cross four garbs or.

General characteristics
- Class & type: River-class frigate
- Displacement: 1,445 long tons (1,468 t; 1,618 short tons); 2,110 long tons (2,140 t; 2,360 short tons) (deep load)
- Length: 283 ft (86.26 m) p/p; 301.25 ft (91.82 m)o/a
- Beam: 36.5 ft (11.13 m)
- Draught: 9 ft (2.74 m); 13 ft (3.96 m) (deep load)
- Propulsion: 2 x Admiralty 3-drum boilers, 2 shafts, reciprocating vertical triple expansion, 5,500 ihp (4,100 kW)
- Speed: 20 knots (37.0 km/h); 20.5 knots (38.0 km/h) (turbine ships)
- Range: 646 long tons (656 t; 724 short tons) oil fuel; 7,500 nautical miles (13,890 km) at 15 knots (27.8 km/h)
- Complement: 157
- Armament: 2 × QF 4 in (102 mm)/45 Mk. XVI on twin mount HA/LA Mk.XIX; 8 × 20 mm QF Oerlikon A/A on twin mounts Mk.V; 1 × Hedgehog 24 spigot A/S projector; up to 150 depth charges

HMCS Stettler was a River-class frigate that served with the Royal Canadian Navy during the Second World War. She served primarily as a convoy escort in the Battle of the Atlantic. She was named for Stettler, Alberta. After the war she was converted to a Prestonian-class frigate and served until 1966.

Stettler was ordered in October 1941 as part of the 1942–1943 River-class building program. She was laid down on 31 May 1943 by Canadian Vickers Ltd. at Montreal, Quebec and launched 9 October later that year. She was commissioned into the Royal Canadian Navy on 7 May 1944 at Montreal.

== Background ==
The River-class frigate was designed by William Reed of Smith's Dock Company of South Bank-on-Tees. Originally called a "twin-screw corvette", its purpose was to improve on the convoy escort classes in service with the Royal Navy at the time, including the Flower-class corvette. The first orders were placed by the Royal Navy in 1940 and the vessels were named for rivers in the United Kingdom, giving name to the class. In Canada they were named for towns and cities though they kept the same designation. The name "frigate" was suggested by Vice-Admiral Percy Nelles of the Royal Canadian Navy and was adopted later that year.

Improvements over the corvette design included improved accommodation which was markedly better. The twin engines gave only three more knots of speed but extended the range of the ship to nearly double that of a corvette at 7,200 nautical miles (13,300 km) at 12 knots. Among other lessons applied to the design was an armament package better designed to combat U-boats including a twin 4-inch mount forward and 12-pounder aft. 15 Canadian frigates were initially fitted with a single 4-inch gun forward but with the exception of HMCS Valleyfield, they were all eventually upgraded to the double mount. For underwater targets, the River-class frigate was equipped with a Hedgehog anti-submarine mortar and depth charge rails aft and four side-mounted throwers.

River-class frigates were the first Royal Canadian Navy warships to carry the 147B Sword horizontal fan echo sonar transmitter in addition to the irregular ASDIC. This allowed the ship to maintain contact with targets even while firing unless a target was struck. Improved radar and direction-finding equipment improved the RCN's ability to find and track enemy submarines over the previous classes.

Canada originally ordered the construction of 33 frigates in October 1941. The design was too big for the shipyards on the Great Lakes so all the frigates built in Canada were built in dockyards along the west coast or along the St. Lawrence River. In all Canada ordered the construction of 60 frigates including ten for the Royal Navy that transferred two to the United States Navy.

== Service history ==
After working up in Bermuda, Stettler returned to Halifax where she was assigned to local escort group EG 16. She remained with the group when it transferred to Londonderry Port in March 1945. She escorted convoys to and from Gibraltar twice, otherwise remaining on patrol in the waters around the United Kingdom.

In June 1945, Stettler returned to Canada from Europe, the last Canadian warship to do so. Upon her return she began a tropicalization refit at Shelburne for possible service in the southern Pacific Ocean. This meant adding refrigeration and water-cooling capabilities and changing the camouflage. The refit was cancelled in August 1945 due to the surrender of Japan. Stettler was paid off 9 November 1945 and laid up.

=== Postwar service ===
After the war, Stettler was sold to private interests. However she was taken over in 1952 by the Royal Canadian Navy when they decided to refit old River-class frigates. She underwent conversion to a Prestonian-class frigate as part of the need to expand the anti-submarine force within the navy. This meant a flush-decked appearance aft, with a larger bridge and taller funnel. Her hull forward was strengthened against ice and the quarterdeck was enclosed to contain two Squid anti-submarine mortars. and was recommissioned 27 February 1954 at Halifax, Nova Scotia with the new pennant number 311. She transferred to the west coast and on 1 January 1955, the frigate was assigned to the Second Canadian Escort Squadron of Pacific Command. In November 1955, the Second Canadian Escort Squadron was among the Canadian units that took part in one of the largest naval exercises since the Second World War off the coast of California.

In January 1960, Stettler and three other Prestonian-class ships made a tour of South American ports, visiting San Diego, Balboa, the Galapagos Islands, Callao and Valparaíso, Talara and Long Beach. Stettler was a member of the Fourth Canadian Escort Squadron based out of Esquimalt, British Columbia. In June 1960 the Fourth Canadian Escort Squadron performed a training tour of the Pacific, with stops at Yokohama, Japan, Midway Atoll and Pearl Harbor. They returned to Canada in August. The frigate remained in service there until 31 August 1966 when she was paid off. She was sold to Capital Iron & Metals Ltd. of Victoria, British Columbia and scrapped there in 1967.
