= HMCS Ste. Therese =

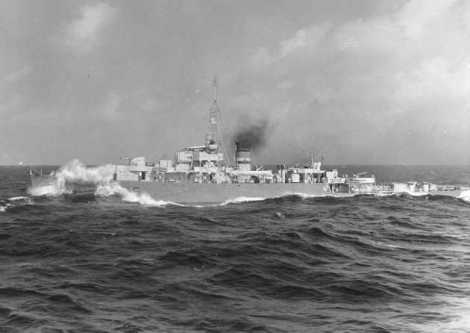
- HMCS Ste. Therese

History

Canada
- Name: Ste. Therese
- Namesake: Sainte-Thérèse-de-Gaspé, Quebec
- Ordered: 1 February 1943
- Builder: Davie Shipbuilding, Lauzon
- Laid down: 18 May 1943
- Launched: 16 October 1943
- Commissioned: 28 May 1944
- Decommissioned: 2 November 1945
- Identification: Pennant number: K 366
- Recommissioned: 22 January 1955
- Decommissioned: 30 January 1967
- Reclassified: Prestonian-class frigate
- Identification: pennant number: FFE 309
- Motto: "En devoir, l'honneur" (In duty-honour)
- Honours and awards: Atlantic 1945, North Sea 1945
- Fate: Sold for scrapping 1967
- Badge: Azure, three crescents conjoined, two above fesswise and one below, surmounted by a mullet or.

General characteristics
- Class & type: River-class frigate
- Displacement: 1,445 long tons (1,468 t; 1,618 short tons); 2,110 long tons (2,140 t; 2,360 short tons) (deep load)
- Length: 283 ft (86.26 m) p/p; 301.25 ft (91.82 m)o/a
- Beam: 36.5 ft (11.13 m)
- Draught: 9 ft (2.74 m); 13 ft (3.96 m) (deep load)
- Propulsion: 2 x Admiralty 3-drum boilers, 2 shafts, reciprocating vertical triple expansion, 5,500 ihp (4,100 kW)
- Speed: 20 knots (37.0 km/h); 20.5 knots (38.0 km/h) (turbine ships)
- Range: 646 long tons (656 t; 724 short tons) oil fuel; 7,500 nautical miles (13,890 km) at 15 knots (27.8 km/h)
- Complement: 157
- Armament: 2 × QF 4 in (102 mm)/45 Mk. XVI on twin mount HA/LA Mk.XIX; 1 × QF 12 pdr (3 in (76 mm)) 12 cwt /40 Mk. V on mounting HA/LA Mk.IX (not all ships); 8 × 20 mm QF Oerlikon A/A on twin mounts Mk.V; 1 × Hedgehog 24 spigot A/S projector; up to 150 depth charges

HMCS Ste. Therese was a River-class frigate that served with the Royal Canadian Navy during the Second World War. She served primarily as a convoy escort in the Battle of the Atlantic. She was named for Sainte-Thérèse-de-Gaspé, Quebec. After the war she was converted to a Prestonian-class frigate and served until 1967.

Ste. Therese was ordered on 1 February 1943 as part of the 1943–1944 River-class building program. She was laid down on 18 May 1943 by Davie Shipbuilding and Repairing Co. Ltd. at Lauzon, Quebec and launched 16 October later that year. She was commissioned into the Royal Canadian Navy on 28 May 1944 at Lévis, Quebec.

== Background ==
The River-class frigate was designed by William Reed of Smith's Dock Company of South Bank-on-Tees. Originally called a "twin-screw corvette", its purpose was to improve on the convoy escort classes in service with the Royal Navy at the time, including the Flower-class corvette. The Royal Navy placed the first orders in 1940 and the vessels were named for rivers in the United Kingdom, giving name to the class. In Canada they were named for towns and cities though they kept the same designation. The name "frigate" was suggested by Vice-Admiral Percy Nelles of the Royal Canadian Navy and was adopted later that year.

Improvements over the corvette design included improved accommodation which was markedly better. The twin engines gave only three more knots of speed but extended the range of the ship to nearly double that of a corvette at 7,200 nautical miles (13,300 km) at 12 knots. Among other lessons applied to the design was an armament package better designed to combat U-boats including a twin 4-inch mount forward and 12-pounder aft. 15 Canadian frigates were initially fitted with a single 4-inch gun forward but with the exception of HMCS Valleyfield, they were all eventually upgraded to the double mount. For underwater targets, the River-class frigate was equipped with a Hedgehog anti-submarine mortar and depth charge rails aft and four side-mounted throwers.

River-class frigates were the first Royal Canadian Navy warships to carry the 147B Sword horizontal fan echo sonar transmitter in addition to the irregular ASDIC. This allowed the ship to maintain contact with targets even while firing unless a target was struck. Improved radar and direction-finding equipment improved the RCN's ability to find and track enemy submarines over the previous classes.

Canada originally ordered the construction of 33 frigates in October 1941. The design was too big for the shipyards on the Great Lakes so all the frigates built in Canada were built in dockyards along the west coast or along the St. Lawrence River. In all Canada ordered the construction of 60 frigates including ten for the Royal Navy that transferred two to the United States Navy.

== Service history ==
After working up in St. Margaret's Bay and Bermuda, Ste. Therese returned to Halifax in mid-August 1944. She left for England in October to join escort group EG 25. She remained with that group patrolling the waters around the United Kingdom until February 1945 when she was reassigned to escort group EG 28, based out of Halifax. She was Senior Officer's Ship of the group for at least the period of 14 March to 20 April 1945. She returned to Canada and served locally around Halifax until the end of the war. She was paid off on 22 November 1945 at Sydney, Nova Scotia and laid up at Shelburne in reserve.

=== Postwar service ===
Ste. Therese was chosen to undergo conversion to a Prestonian-class ocean escort as part of the need to expand the anti-submarine force within the navy. This meant a flush-decked appearance aft, with a larger bridge and taller funnel. Her hull forward was strengthened against ice and the quarterdeck was enclosed to contain two Squid anti-submarine mortars. On 1 January 1955, Ste. Therese was assigned to the Second Canadian Escort Squadron of Pacific Command. She emerged from her conversion at Saint John to be recommissioned into the Royal Canadian Navy with the new pennant 309 on 22 January 1955.

From 26 July to 3 September 1955, the newly recommissioned Ste. Therese was used by the Pacific Oceanographic Group to survey parts of the North Pacific Ocean as part of a joint mission between Canada, the United States and Japan. In November 1955, Ste. Therese was among the Canadian units that took part in one of the largest naval exercises since the Second World War off the coast of California.

She returned again as an oceanographic survey platform in 1957. In January 1960, Ste. Therese and three other Prestonian-class ships made a tour of South American ports, visiting San Diego, Balboa, the Galapagos Islands, Callao and Valparaíso, Talara and Long Beach. Ste. Therese was a member of the Fourth Canadian Escort Squadron based out of Esquimalt, British Columbia. In June 1960 the Fourth Canadian Escort Squadron performed a training tour of the Pacific, with stops at Adak, Alaska, Yokohama, Japan, Midway Atoll and Pearl Harbor. They returned to Canada in August. She served until 1967 on the west coast when she was paid off for the final time on 30 January 1967. She was towed to Japan and broken up that same year. (Note: uboat.net states that Ste. Therese was turned into a yacht.)
