= HMCS Toronto (K538) =

Royal Canadian naval vessel

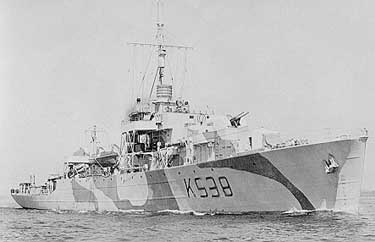
- HMCS Toronto

History

Canada
- Name: Toronto
- Namesake: Toronto, Ontario
- Ordered: 1 February 1943
- Builder: Davie Shipbuilding, Lauzon
- Yard number: 550
- Laid down: 10 May 1943
- Launched: 18 September 1943
- Commissioned: 6 May 1944
- Decommissioned: 27 November 1945
- Identification: pennant number: K538
- Recommissioned: 26 November 1953
- Decommissioned: 14 April 1956
- Reclassified: Prestonian-class frigate
- Identification: pennant number: FFE 319
- Motto: "Be worthy"
- Honours and awards: Gulf of St. Lawrence, 1944
- Fate: Transferred to Norway in 1956 as Garm
- Badge: Azure, a mural crown argent, masoned sable, surmounted by a beaver proper holding in the dexter paw a fid spike or

Norway
- Name: Garm
- Namesake: the Ragnarök hound Garmr
- Acquired: loaned 10 March 1956; purchased 1959
- Commissioned: 1956
- Decommissioned: 1977
- Renamed: Valkyrien (1965)
- Reclassified: torpedo boat depot ship (1965)
- Identification: (as Garm) F315
- Fate: Sold 1977

General characteristics
- Class & type: River-class frigate
- Displacement: 1,445 long tons (1,468 t; 1,618 short tons); 2,110 long tons (2,140 t; 2,360 short tons) (deep load)
- Length: 283 ft (86.26 m) p/p; 301.25 ft (91.82 m) o/a
- Beam: 36.5 ft (11.13 m)
- Draught: 9 ft (2.74 m); 13 ft (3.96 m) (deep load)
- Propulsion: 2 × Admiralty 3-drum boilers, 2 shafts, reciprocating vertical triple expansion, 5,500 ihp (4,100 kW)
- Speed: 20 knots (37.0 km/h); 20.5 knots (38.0 km/h) (turbine ships)
- Range: 646 long tons (656 t; 724 short tons) oil fuel;
- Complement: 157
- Armament: 2 × QF 4 in (102 mm)/45 Mk. XVI on twin mount HA/LA Mk.XIX; 8 × 20 mm QF Oerlikon A/A on twin mounts Mk.V; 1 × Hedgehog 24 spigot A/S projector; up to 150 depth charges

HMCS Toronto was a River-class frigate that served in the Royal Canadian Navy during the Second World War and as a Prestonian-class frigate from 1953-1956. She was named for Toronto, Ontario. She was later acquired by the Royal Norwegian Navy and renamed Garm and then again in 1965 as HNoMS Valkyrien .

Toronto was ordered 1 February 1943 as Giffard (after Giffard, Quebec) as part of the 1943-1944 River-class building program. She was laid down on 10 May 1943 by Davie Shipbuilding & Repairing Co. Ltd. at Lauzon and launched 18 September 1943. Her name was changed to Toronto and she was commissioned into the RCN on 6 May 1944 with the pennant K538.

== Background ==
The River-class frigate was designed by William Reed of Smith's Dock Company of South Bank-on-Tees. Originally called a "twin-screw corvette", its purpose was to improve on the convoy escort classes in service with the Royal Navy at the time, including the Flower-class corvette. The first orders were placed by the Royal Navy in 1940 and the vessels were named for rivers in the United Kingdom, giving name to the class. In Canada they were named for towns and cities though they kept the same designation. The name "frigate" was suggested by Vice-Admiral Percy Nelles of the Royal Canadian Navy and was adopted later that year.

Improvements over the corvette design included improved accommodation which was markedly better. The twin engines gave only three more knots of speed but extended the range of the ship to nearly double that of a corvette at 7,200 nautical miles (13,300 km) at 12 knots. Among other lessons applied to the design was an armament package better designed to combat U-boats including a twin 4-inch mount forward and 12-pounder aft. 15 Canadian frigates were initially fitted with a single 4-inch gun forward but with the exception of HMCS Valleyfield, they were all eventually upgraded to the double mount. For underwater targets, the River-class frigate was equipped with a Hedgehog anti-submarine mortar and depth charge rails aft and four side-mounted throwers.

River-class frigates were the first Royal Canadian Navy warships to carry the 147B Sword horizontal fan echo sonar transmitter in addition to the irregular ASDIC. This allowed the ship to maintain contact with targets even while firing unless a target was struck. Improved radar and direction-finding equipment improved the RCN's ability to find and track enemy submarines over the previous classes.

Canada originally ordered the construction of 33 frigates in October 1941. The design was too big for the shipyards on the Great Lakes so all the frigates built in Canada were built in dockyards along the west coast or along the St. Lawrence River. In all Canada ordered the construction of 60 frigates including ten for the Royal Navy that transferred two to the United States Navy.

== Service history ==
Following extensive work-up exercises in the vicinity of Bermuda, Toronto was assigned to escort group EG 16 which operated out of HMCS Protector at Sydney, Nova Scotia. It was during this time Toronto saw service in the Battle of the St. Lawrence for which the ship was awarded the Battle Honour "Gulf of St. Lawrence - 1944." On 14 October 1944, Toronto was escorting ONS 33G when HMCS Magog, a fellow escort, was torpedoed by U-1223. Magog suffered significant damage from the attack but managed to stay afloat and Toronto took her in tow. However while towing Magog, the other GNAT, an acoustic German torpedo, detonated in Toronto's wake. Toronto handed off the towing duties to HMCS Shawinigan after she recorded a contact and departed to chase it down unsuccessfully.

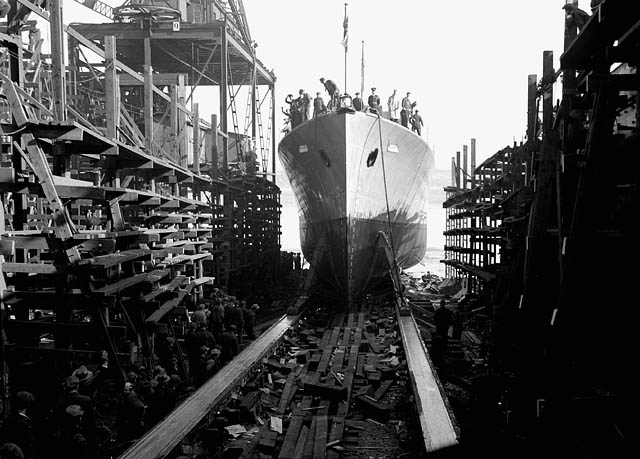
Launch of HMCS Toronto

Following that she served with Halifax Force as a local escort until May 1945. In May she was assigned to HMCS Cornwallis as a training ship. On 27 November 1945, Toronto was paid off and placed in reserve at Shelburne, Nova Scotia.

As part of the planned reactivation of 21 frigates to combat the Soviet submarine threat, Toronto underwent conversion to a Prestonian-class frigate in 1952. This meant a flush-decked appearance aft, with a larger bridge and taller funnel. Her hull forward was strengthened against ice and the quarterdeck was enclosed to contain two Squid anti-submarine mortars. Toronto was recommissioned with pennant number 319 on 26 November 1953 at Lauzon.

The frigate was made a part of the First Canadian Escort Squadron in December 1953. In April 1954, Toronto deployed to Bermuda for anti-submarine training with the British submarine Tally-Ho and the American submarine Cobbler before joining the First Canadian Escort Squadron on their training cruise through the Caribbean Sea, making several port visits. In September, the First Canadian Escort Squadron took part in the NATO naval exercise "New Broom II" and in October, the exercise "Morning Mist" before performing a two-month training cruise in the Mediterranean Sea, making several port visits. The squadron returned to Canada on 10 December 1954.

=== Royal Norwegian Navy ===
It was announced in November 1955 that three Prestonian-class frigates would be loaned to Norway; Toronto, Prestonian and Penetang. Toronto was paid off by the RCN on 14 April 1956 and transferred to the Royal Norwegian Navy as HNoMS Garm. Garm was purchased outright in 1959 and was employed primarily for fisheries protection duties. She was renamed in 1965 to Valkyrien and re-designated a torpedo boat depot ship. She served in this capacity until she was sold and scrapped by the Royal Norwegian Navy in 1977.

== See also ==
- List of ships of the Canadian Navy
