= German submarine U-744 =

German World War II submarine

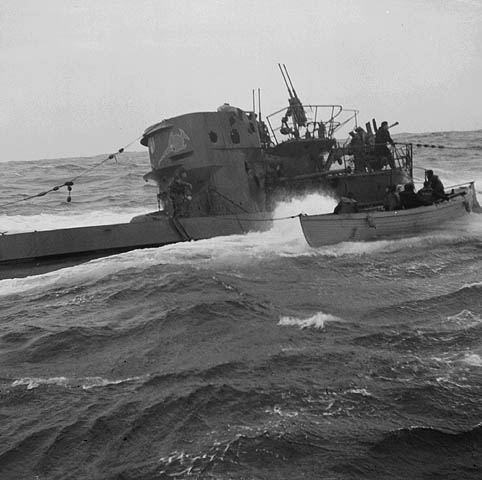
- Whaler from HMCS Chilliwack alongside captured German submarine U-744

History

Nazi Germany
- Name: U-744
- Ordered: 5 June 1941
- Builder: F Schichau GmbH, Danzig
- Yard number: 1547
- Laid down: 5 June 1942
- Launched: 11 March 1943
- Commissioned: 5 June 1943
- Fate: Sunk on 6 March 1944

General characteristics
- Class & type: Type VIIC submarine
- Displacement: 769 tonnes (757 long tons) surfaced; 871 t (857 long tons) submerged
- Length: 67.10 m (220 ft 2 in) o/a; 50.50 m (165 ft 8 in) pressure hull
- Beam: 6.20 m (20 ft 4 in) o/a; 4.70 m (15 ft 5 in) pressure hull
- Height: 9.60 m (31 ft 6 in)
- Draught: 4.74 m (15 ft 7 in)
- Installed power: 2,800–3,200 PS (2,100–2,400 kW; 2,800–3,200 bhp) (diesels); 750 PS (550 kW; 740 shp) (electric)
- Propulsion: 2 shafts; 2 × diesel engines; 2 × electric motors
- Speed: 17.7 knots (32.8 km/h; 20.4 mph) surfaced; 7.6 knots (14.1 km/h; 8.7 mph) submerged
- Range: 8,500 nmi (15,700 km; 9,800 mi) at 10 knots (19 km/h; 12 mph) surfaced; 80 nmi (150 km; 92 mi) at 4 knots (7.4 km/h; 4.6 mph) submerged
- Test depth: 230 m (750 ft); Crush depth: 250–295 m (820–968 ft)
- Complement: 4 officers, 40–56 enlisted
- Armament: 5 × 53.3 cm (21 in) torpedo tubes (four bow, one stern); 14 × torpedoes; 1 × 8.8 cm (3.46 in) deck gun (220 rounds); 2 × twin 2 cm (0.79 in) C/30 anti-aircraft guns

Service record
- Part of: 8th U-boat Flotilla; 5 June – 30 November 1943; 9th U-boat Flotilla; 1 December 1943 – 6 March 1944
- Identification codes: M 51 807
- Commanders: Oblt.z.S. Heinz Blischke; 5 June 1943 – 6 March 1944
- Operations: 2 patrols: 1st patrol: 2 December 1943 – 15 January 1944; 2nd patrol: 24 February – 6 March 1944
- Victories: 1 merchant ship sunk (7,359 GRT); 1 warship sunk (1,625 tons)

German submarine U-744 was a type VIIC U-boat, launched on 11 March 1943, commanded by Oberleutnant zur See Heinz Blischke.

== Design ==
German Type VIIC submarines were preceded by the shorter Type VIIB submarines. U-744 had a displacement of 769 tonnes (757 long tons) when at the surface and 871 tonnes (857 long tons) while submerged. She had a total length of 67.10 m (220 ft 2 in), a pressure hull length of 50.50 m (165 ft 8 in), a beam of 6.20 m (20 ft 4 in), a height of 9.60 m (31 ft 6 in), and a draught of 4.74 m (15 ft 7 in). The submarine was powered by two Germaniawerft F46 four-stroke, six-cylinder supercharged diesel engines producing a total of 2,800 to 3,200 metric horsepower (2,060 to 2,350 kW; 2,760 to 3,160 shp) for use while surfaced, two AEG GU 460/8–27 double-acting electric motors producing a total of 750 metric horsepower (550 kW; 740 shp) for use while submerged. She had two shafts and two 1.23 m (4 ft) propellers. The boat was capable of operating at depths of up to 230 metres (750 ft).

The submarine had a maximum surface speed of 17.7 knots (32.8 km/h; 20.4 mph) and a maximum submerged speed of 7.6 knots (14.1 km/h; 8.7 mph). When submerged, the boat could operate for 80 nautical miles (150 km; 92 mi) at 4 knots (7.4 km/h; 4.6 mph); when surfaced, she could travel 8,500 nautical miles (15,700 km; 9,800 mi) at 10 knots (19 km/h; 12 mph). U-744 was fitted with five 53.3 cm (21 in) torpedo tubes (four fitted at the bow and one at the stern), fourteen torpedoes, one 8.8 cm (3.46 in) SK C/35 naval gun, 220 rounds, and two twin 2 cm (0.79 in) C/30 anti-aircraft guns. The boat had a complement of between forty-four and sixty.

== Service history ==
She had two patrols, one from 2 December 1943 until 15 January 1944 and 24 February 1944 until 6 March 1944. She sank two ships in total, Empire Housman on 3 January 1944, and the landing ship tank HMS LST-362 on 2 March 1944.

U-744 was forced to surface on 6 March 1944, after a 31-hour pursuit by British and Canadian ships. She was depth-charged by HMS Icarus, causing her crew to abandon her. They were picked up by the corvette HMS Kenilworth Castle, the Canadian frigate HMCS St. Catharines, corvettes HMCS Fennel and HMCS Chilliwack and destroyers HMCS Chaudiere and HMCS Gatineau in the North Atlantic. U-744 was then boarded by Allied sailors, who retrieved code books and other documents. Most of this was lost while being transferred between the U-Boat and the Allied ships. After attempts to tow the submarine into port failed, U-744 was scuttled by the allied warships.

=== Wolfpacks ===
U-744 took part in five wolfpacks, namely:

- Coronel 1 (15 – 17 December 1943)
- Sylt (18 – 23 December 1943)
- Rügen 2 (23 – 28 December 1943)
- Rügen 1 (28 December 1943 – 3 January 1944)
- Preussen (26 February – 6 March 1944)

== Summary of raiding history ==
Date	Ship Name	Nationality	Tonnage (Note: Merchant ship tonnages are in gross register tons. Military vessels are listed by tons displacement.)	Fate
3 January 1944	Empire Housman	United Kingdom	7,359	Sunk
2 March 1944	HMS LST-362	Royal Navy	1,625	Sunk

== Bibliography ==
- Busch, Rainer; Röll, Hans-Joachim (1999). German U-boat commanders of World War II : a biographical dictionary. Translated by Brooks, Geoffrey. London, Annapolis, Md: Greenhill Books, Naval Institute Press. ISBN 1-55750-186-6.
- Busch, Rainer; Röll, Hans-Joachim (1999). Der U-Boot-Krieg, 1939-1945: Deutsche U-Boot-Verluste von September 1939 bis Mai 1945 [German U-boat losses from September 1939 to May 1945] (in German). Vol. IV. Hamburg, Berlin, Bonn: Mittler. ISBN 3-8132-0514-2.
- Gröner, Eric; Jung, Dieter; Maass, Martin (1991). German Warships 1815-1945: U-boats and Mine Warfare Vessels. Vol. 2. Translated by Thomas, Keith; Magowan, Rachel. London: Conway Maritime Press. ISBN 0-85177-593-4.
