= HMCS Victoriaville =

1944 River-class frigate

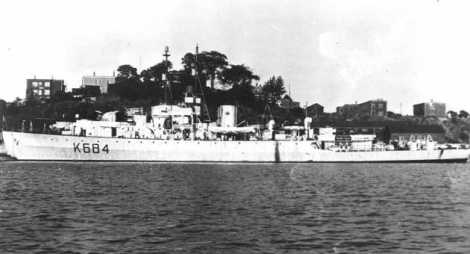
- HMCS Victoriaville

History

Canada
- Name: Victoriaville
- Namesake: Victoriaville, Quebec
- Ordered: 1 February 1943
- Builder: Davie Shipbuilding, Lauzon
- Laid down: 2 December 1943
- Launched: 23 June 1944
- Commissioned: 11 November 1944
- Decommissioned: 17 November 1945
- Identification: Pennant number: K 684
- Recommissioned: 25 September 1959
- Out of service: 31 December 1973
- Renamed: Granby (1966)
- Reclassified: Prestonian-class frigate (1959); diving tender (1966)
- Identification: pennant number: 320
- Motto: Domine dirige nos ("Direct us, O Lord")
- Honours and awards: Atlantic 1945
- Fate: Scrapped 1974
- Badge: Argent, a saltire gules upon the center of which an oak tree charged with a royal coronet all proper

General characteristics
- Class & type: River-class frigate
- Displacement: 1,445 long tons (1,468 t; 1,618 short tons); 2,110 long tons (2,140 t; 2,360 short tons) (deep load)
- Length: 283 ft (86.26 m) p/p; 301.25 ft (91.82 m)o/a
- Beam: 36.5 ft (11.13 m)
- Draught: 9 ft (2.74 m); 13 ft (3.96 m) (deep load)
- Propulsion: 2 x Admiralty 3-drum boilers, 2 shafts, reciprocating vertical triple expansion, 5,500 ihp (4,100 kW)
- Speed: 20 knots (37.0 km/h); 20.5 knots (38.0 km/h) (turbine ships)
- Range: 646 long tons (656 t; 724 short tons) oil fuel; 7,500 nautical miles (13,890 km) at 15 knots (27.8 km/h)
- Complement: 157
- Armament: 2 × QF 4 in (102 mm)/45 Mk. XVI on twin mount HA/LA Mk.XIX; 1 × QF 12 pdr (3 in (76 mm)) 12 cwt /40 Mk. V on mounting HA/LA Mk.IX (not all ships); 8 × 20 mm QF Oerlikon A/A on twin mounts Mk.V; 1 × Hedgehog 24 spigot A/S projector; up to 150 depth charges

HMCS Victoriaville was a River-class frigate that served with the Royal Canadian Navy during the Second World War. She served primarily as a convoy escort in the Battle of the Atlantic. She was named for Victoriaville, Quebec. After the war she was converted to a Prestonian-class frigate in 1959. In 1966 she was converted to a diving tender and renamed Granby, serving as such until 1973 when she was decommissioned for the final time.

Victoriaville was ordered on 1 February 1943 as part of the 1943–1944 River-class building program. She was laid down on 2 December 1943 by George T. Davie Shipbuilding Ltd. at Lauzon, Quebec and launched 23 June 1944. She was commissioned into the Royal Canadian Navy on 11 November 1944 at Quebec City.

== Background ==
The River-class frigate was designed by William Reed of Smith's Dock Company of South Bank-on-Tees. Originally called a "twin-screw corvette", its purpose was to improve on the convoy escort classes in service with the Royal Navy at the time, including the Flower-class corvette. The first orders were placed by the Royal Navy in 1940 and the vessels were named for rivers in the United Kingdom, giving name to the class. In Canada they were named for towns and cities though they kept the same designation. The name "frigate" was suggested by Vice-Admiral Percy Nelles of the Royal Canadian Navy and was adopted later that year.

Improvements over the corvette design included improved accommodation which was markedly better. The twin engines gave only three more knots of speed but extended the range of the ship to nearly double that of a corvette at 7,200 nautical miles (13,300 km) at 12 knots. Among other lessons applied to the design was an armament package better designed to combat U-boats including a twin 4-inch mount forward and 12-pounder aft. 15 Canadian frigates were initially fitted with a single 4-inch gun forward but with the exception of HMCS Valleyfield, they were all eventually upgraded to the double mount. For underwater targets, the River-class frigate was equipped with a Hedgehog anti-submarine mortar and depth charge rails aft and four side-mounted throwers.

River-class frigates were the first Royal Canadian Navy warships to carry the 147B Sword horizontal fan echo sonar transmitter in addition to the irregular ASDIC. This allowed the ship to maintain contact with targets even while firing unless a target was struck. Improved radar and direction-finding equipment improved the RCN's ability to find and track enemy submarines over the previous classes.

Canada originally ordered the construction of 33 frigates in October 1941. The design was too big for the shipyards on the Great Lakes so all the frigates built in Canada were built in dockyards along the west coast or along the St. Lawrence River. In all Canada ordered the construction of 60 frigates including ten for the Royal Navy that transferred two to the United States Navy.

== Service history ==
After working up in Bermuda, Victoriaville was assigned to the Mid-Ocean Escort Force escort group C-9 in February 1945. She spent the rest of the war in Europe as a trans-Atlantic convoy escort. She returned to Canada in May 1945 and on 12 May escorted the surrendered German submarine U-190 into Bay Bulls.

Later in May 1945, Victoriaville traveled to Saint John to undergo a tropicalization refit for possible service in the southern Pacific Ocean. This meant adding refrigeration and water-cooling capabilities and changing the camouflage. The refit was halted on 20 August 1945 and on 17 November that year, she was paid off at Sydney and laid up at Shelburne.

=== Postwar service ===
After the war Victoriaville was sold to Marine Industries Ltd. However, with the increasing Soviet submarine threat, the Royal Canadian Navy sought to augment its anti-submarine forces. She was reacquired and converted into a Prestonian-class frigate. This meant a flush-decked appearance aft, with a larger bridge and taller funnel. Her hull forward was strengthened against ice and the quarterdeck was enclosed to contain two Squid anti-submarine mortars. She emerged from the refit and was recommissioned into the Royal Canadian Navy on 25 September 1959 with the new pennant number 320. Victoriaville was assigned to the Seventh Canadian Escort Squadron.

Victoriaville served in an anti-submarine warfare role until 21 December 1966 when she was renamed Granby and was reclassified as a diving tender, taking over the name and role of the retiring HMCS Granby, but kept her pennant number. She operated in this capacity until 31 December 1973 when she was paid off. She was sold for scrap in 1974.

=== Shag Harbour UFO incident ===
On the night of 4 October 1967 there was reported an impact of an unknown large object into waters near Shag Harbour, located in Barrington on Nova Scotia's South Shore. Seven navy divers from HMCS Granby conducted an underwater search until 8 October, when the search was cancelled. The Royal Canadian Navy reported nothing was found. The incident is known as the Shag Harbour UFO incident.
