= HMCS Granby (J264) =

History

Canada
- Name: Granby
- Namesake: Granby, Quebec
- Builder: Davie Shipbuilding, Lauzon
- Laid down: 17 December 1940
- Launched: 6 September 1941
- Commissioned: 2 May 1942
- Decommissioned: 31 July 1945
- Identification: pennant number: J264
- Recommissioned: 23 May 1953
- Decommissioned: 15 December 1966
- Reclassified: Deep-diving tender 1953
- Identification: Classification: 180
- Honours and awards: Atlantic 1942–45, Gulf of St. Lawrence 1942, 1944.
- Badge: Gules, a bee's wings extended or, charged on the lower body with two bars azure, and supported between the two front feet in chief a coronet of a marquis of England proper

General characteristics
- Class & type: Bangor-class minesweeper
- Displacement: 592 long tons (601 t)
- Length: 162 ft (49.4 m)
- Beam: 28 ft (8.5 m)
- Draught: 8.25 ft (2.51 m)
- Propulsion: 2 shafts, 9-cylinder diesel, 2,000 bhp (1,500 kW)
- Speed: 16 knots (30 km/h)
- Complement: 83
- Armament: 1 × QF 12-pounder 12 cwt naval gun; 1 × QF 2-pounder Mark VIII; 2 × QF 20 mm Oerlikon guns; 40 depth charges as escort

HMCS Granby was a Bangor-class minesweeper that served in the Royal Canadian Navy during the Second World War. She saw action in the Battle of the Atlantic and the Battle of the St. Lawrence. After the war, she was transferred to the Royal Canadian Mounted Police, however never saw service with them. She was recommissioned as a deep-diving tender in 1953 and served as such until 1966. She was named for Granby, Quebec.

== Design and description ==
The Bangor class was initially to be a scaled down minesweeper design of the Halcyon class in Royal Navy service. However, due to the difficulty procuring diesel engines led to the small number of the diesel version being completed. The ships displaced 592 long tons (601 t) standard and 690 long tons (700 t) fully loaded. They were 162 feet (49.4 m) long with a beam of 28 feet (8.5 m) and a draught of 8 feet 3 inches (2.51 m). However, the size of the ship led to criticisms of their being too cramped for magnetic or acoustic minesweeping gear. This may have been due to all the additions made during the war with the installation of ASDIC, radar and depth charges.

The Bangor class came in two versions. Granby was of the diesel-powered version, being equipped with a 9-cylinder diesel engine driving two shafts that produced 2,000 brake horsepower (1,500 kW). This gave the ship a maximum speed of 16.5 knots (30.6 km/h). The vessels carried 65 long tons (66 t) of oil. The vessels had a complement of 6 officers and 77 ratings.

The Canadian diesel-powered Bangors were armed with a single quick-firing (QF) 12-pounder 12 cwt gun mounted forward. (Note: "Cwt" is the abbreviation for hundredweight, 20 cwt referring to the weight of the gun.) The ships were also fitted with a QF 2-pounder Mark VIII gun aft and were eventually fitted with single-mounted QF 20 mm Oerlikon guns on the bridge wings. For those ships assigned to convoy duty, they were armed with two depth charge launchers and two chutes to deploy the 40 depth charges they carried.

== Service history ==
Granby was ordered as part of the 1940–41 building programme. The minesweeper's keel was laid down on 17 December 1940 by Davie Shipbuilding and Repairing Co. Ltd. at Lauzon, Quebec. The ship was launched on 6 September 1941 and commissioned into the Royal Canadian Navy on 2 May 1942 at Quebec City.

After working up, Granby was assigned to Sydney Force. She eventually transferred to the Western Local Escort Force (WLEF). In January 1943 WLEF organized its escorts into groups. Granby joined 24.18.5 alongside the destroyer Niagara and corvette Matapedia. In June 1943, when WLEF reorganized its escort groups, Granby was assigned to group W-3. She remained with this group until May 1944 when she rejoined Sydney Force. In September 1943, Granby was among the warships deployed as part of the Canadian force to break up Operation Kiebitz, the German plan to breakout prisoner of war U-boat captains from a camp in Canada.

Before actively rejoining the unit, Granby underwent a major refit at Lunenburg from June to October 1944. Following workups in November she returned to service. In February 1945, she transferred again, this time to Shelburne Force, lasting only two months with that group before switching to Halifax Force in April. She remained with that group (under repair) until being paid off on 31 July 1945.

=== Postwar service ===
After the war Granby was transferred to the Royal Canadian Mounted Police Marine Unit, to be renamed Col. White. However, she was never taken over. The Royal Canadian Navy however, recommissioned her on 23 May 1953 for conversion to a deep-diving tender. She was used, along with sister ship Digby, in 1953 on Lake Ontario to test the Royal Canadian Navy's DATAR system. She served as a diving tender until 15 December 1966 when she was paid off for the final time. Her name and duties were transferred to the Prestonian-class frigate Victoriaville. The ship was put for sale and sold in 1975.

== See also ==
- List of ships of the Canadian Navy
