= HMCS Fennel =

Flower-class corvette

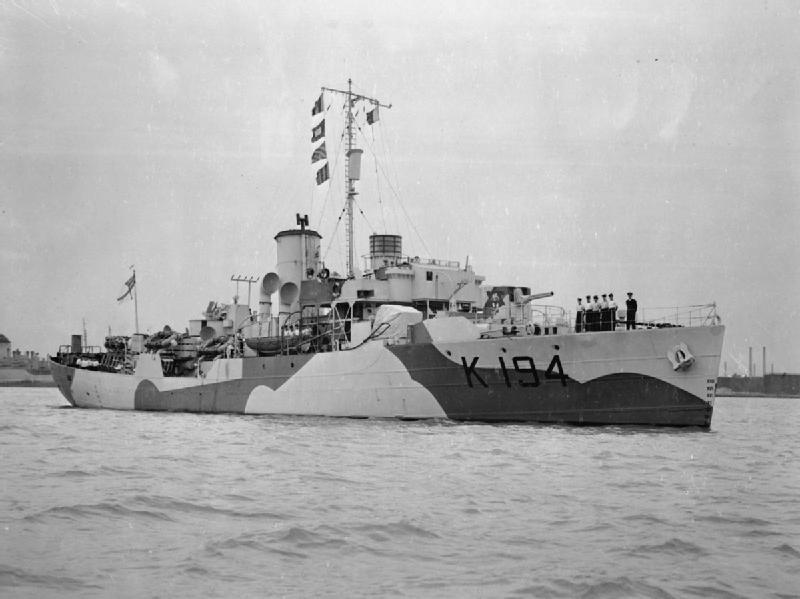
- HMCS Fennel, sometime between 1943–45

History

United Kingdom
- Name: Fennel
- Namesake: Fennel
- Ordered: 22 January 1940
- Builder: Marine Industries Ltd., Sorel
- Laid down: 29 March 1940
- Launched: 20 August 1940
- Commissioned: 16 January 1941
- Out of service: 15 May 1941 – loaned to Canada
- Identification: Pennant number: K194
- Fate: Loaned to Canada 1941; returned 1945; sold 1946

Canada
- Name: Fennel
- Acquired: loaned from Royal Navy
- Commissioned: 15 May 1941
- Out of service: 12 June 1945
- Identification: Pennant number: K194
- Honours and awards: Atlantic 1941–45
- Fate: Returned to the Royal Navy 12 June 1945.

General characteristics
- Class & type: Flower-class corvette (original)
- Displacement: 925 long tons (940 t; 1,036 short tons)
- Length: 205 ft (62.48 m)o/a
- Beam: 33 ft (10.06 m)
- Draught: 11.5 ft (3.51 m)
- Propulsion: single shaft; 2 × fire tube Scotch boilers; 1 × 4-cycle triple-expansion reciprocating steam engine; 2,750 ihp (2,050 kW)
- Speed: 16 knots (29.6 km/h)
- Range: 3,500 nautical miles (6,482 km) at 12 knots (22.2 km/h)
- Complement: 85
- Sensors & processing systems: 1 × SW1C or 2C radar; 1 × Type 123A or Type 127DV sonar
- Armament: 1 × BL 4-inch (101.6 mm) Mk.IX single gun; 2 × .50 cal machine gun (twin); 2 × Lewis .303 cal machine gun (twin); 2 × Mk.II depth charge throwers; 2 × Depth charge rails with 40 depth charges; originally fitted with minesweeping gear, later removed

HMCS Fennel was a Flower-class corvette that served primarily with the Royal Canadian Navy during the Second World War. Originally commissioned into the Royal Navy, she served as an ocean escort in the Battle of the Atlantic.

== Background ==
Flower-class corvettes like Fennel serving with the Royal Canadian Navy during the Second World War were different from earlier and more traditional sail-driven corvettes. The "corvette" designation was created by the French as a class of small warships; the Royal Navy borrowed the term for a period but discontinued its use in 1877. During the hurried preparations for war in the late 1930s, Winston Churchill reactivated the corvette class, needing a name for smaller ships used in an escort capacity, in this case based on a whaling ship design. The generic name "flower" was used to designate the class of these ships, which – in the Royal Navy – were named after flowering plants.

== Construction ==
Fennel was ordered by the Royal Navy on 22 January 1940 as part of the 1939–1940 Flower-class building program. She was laid down 29 March 1940 by Marine Industries Ltd. at Sorel, Quebec and launched 20 August later that year. Fennel was towed to Liverpool, Nova Scotia and was commissioned into the Royal Navy on 16 January 1941. She was finished enough to make an ocean crossing as part of HX 113 and was completed at Greenock, United Kingdom. On 15 May 1941 Fennel was one of ten corvettes loaned to Canada. She could be told apart from other Canadian Flowers by her lack of minesweeping gear and the siting of the after gun tub amidships.

Fennel had four major refits during her career as a warship. The first took place at Halifax for a brief two-month refit beginning in October 1941. The second took place at New York from mid-July 1942 until late September 1942. The third major refit took place at Baltimore that began in June 1943 and lasted until September of that year. During this refit, the fo'c'sle was extended. Fennel's final refit took place in August 1944 at Pictou, Nova Scotia and took two months to complete.

== War service ==
=== Royal Navy ===
After completing at Greenock, Fennel was sent to Tobermory, the site of the ocean escort training facilities, to work up. Upon completion, she was assigned to Western Approaches Command until June 1941 when she was reassigned to Newfoundland Command. This was after being loaned to Canada in May 1941.

=== Royal Canadian Navy ===
Joining Newfoundland Command in June, Fennel was assigned to escort group 22N until September 1941 and then group N11 from December 1941 until March 1942 as an ocean escort. Beginning in April 1942 she had a brief spell as a member of Mid-Ocean Escort Force (MOEF) escort group C-1 before transferring to the Western Local Escort Force (WLEF) in June of that year. She remained a part of WLEF until June 1943.

In June 1943, Fennel joined MOEF group C-2 for one escort assignment before heading off for a refit. Upon completion of workups, she returned to C-2. She remained with this group until December 1944.

On 6 March 1944, after unsuccessful attempts at towing the boat to port U-744 was sunk in the North Atlantic, in position 52°01′N, 22°37′W, after being torpedoed by the British destroyer HMS Icarus. U-744 was attacked for over 30 hours by depth charges from the Fennel, along with HMS Icarus, the frigate HMCS St. Catharines, corvettes HMCS Chilliwack and HMS Kenilworth Castle, destroyers HMCS Chaudiere and HMCS Gatineau. Not all these ships fought at the same time, as Gatineau and Kenilworth Castle both had to leave with mechanical defects during the battle.

In December 1944, Fennel transferred to MOEF escort group C-1. She remained with that group for the rest of the war. On 12 June 1945, Fennel was paid off and returned to the Royal Navy.

== Post-war service ==
After lay up, Fennel was sold for mercantile conversion in 1946. In 1948 she was registered under a Norwegian flag as Milliam Kihl. She was rebuilt as buoy-boat in October 1948. She was refitted as whaler in 1951 in Kiel, West Germany. Laid up in 1960/1961, her last drifting season was in 1964/1965. She was laid up again in Sandefjord and sold to Norwegian shipbreakers in Grimstad in 1966.
