= HMCS St. Catharines =

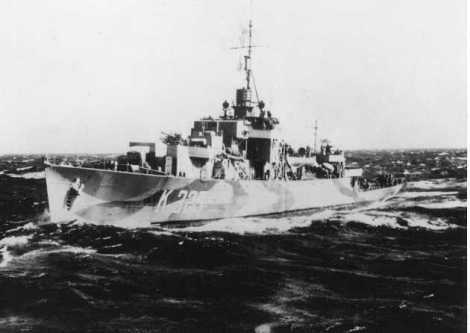
- HMCS St. Catharines

History

Canada
- Name: St. Catharines
- Namesake: St. Catharines, Ontario
- Operator: Royal Canadian Navy
- Ordered: October 1941
- Builder: Yarrows Ltd., Esquimalt
- Laid down: 2 May 1942
- Launched: 5 December 1942
- Commissioned: 31 July 1943
- Decommissioned: 14 December 1945
- Identification: pennant number: K 325
- Honours and awards: Atlantic 1943–44
- Fate: Converted to Weather ship 1950

General characteristics
- Class & type: River-class frigate
- Displacement: 1,445 long tons (1,468 t; 1,618 short tons); 2,110 long tons (2,140 t; 2,360 short tons) (deep load)
- Length: 283 ft (86.26 m) p/p; 301.25 ft (91.82 m) o/a
- Beam: 36.5 ft (11.13 m)
- Draught: 9 ft (2.74 m); 13 ft (3.96 m) (deep load)
- Propulsion: 2 x Admiralty 3-drum boilers, 2 shafts, reciprocating vertical triple expansion, 5,500 ihp (4,100 kW)
- Speed: 20 knots (37.0 km/h); 20.5 knots (38.0 km/h) (turbine ships)
- Range: 646 long tons (656 t; 724 short tons) oil fuel; 7,500 nautical miles (13,890 km) at 15 knots (27.8 km/h)
- Complement: 157
- Armament: 2 × QF 4 in (102 mm) /45 Mk. XVI on twin mount HA/LA Mk.XIX; 1 × QF 12 pdr (3 in (76 mm)) 12 cwt /40 Mk. V on mounting HA/LA Mk.IX (not all ships); 8 × 20 mm QF Oerlikon A/A on twin mounts Mk.V; 1 × Hedgehog 24 spigot A/S projector; up to 150 depth charges

HMCS St. Catharines was a River-class frigate that served with the Royal Canadian Navy during the Second World War. She served primarily as a convoy escort in the Battle of the Atlantic. She was named for St. Catharines, Ontario. After the war she was re-purposed as a weather ship for use by the Department of Transport of Canada.

St. Catharines was ordered in October 1941 as part of the 1942–1943 River-class building program. She was laid down on 2 May 1942 by Yarrows Ltd. at Esquimalt and launched 5 December later that year. She was commissioned into the Royal Canadian Navy on 31 July 1943 at Esquimalt.

== Background ==
The River-class frigate was designed by William Reed of Smith's Dock Company of South Bank-on-Tees. Originally called a "twin-screw corvette", its purpose was to improve on the convoy escort classes in service with the Royal Navy at the time, including the Flower-class corvette. The first orders were placed by the Royal Navy in 1940 and the vessels were named for rivers in the United Kingdom, giving name to the class. In Canada they were named for towns and cities though they kept the same designation. The name "frigate" was suggested by Vice-Admiral Percy Nelles of the Royal Canadian Navy and was adopted later that year.

Improvements over the corvette design included improved accommodation which was markedly better. The twin engines gave only three more knots of speed but extended the range of the ship to nearly double that of a corvette at 7,200 nautical miles (13,300 km) at 12 knots. Among other lessons applied to the design was an armament package better designed to combat U-boats including a twin 4-inch mount forward and 12-pounder aft. 15 Canadian frigates were initially fitted with a single 4-inch gun forward but with the exception of HMCS Valleyfield, they were all eventually upgraded to the double mount. For underwater targets, the River-class frigate was equipped with a Hedgehog anti-submarine mortar and depth charge rails aft and four side-mounted throwers.

River-class frigates were the first Royal Canadian Navy warships to carry the 147B Sword horizontal fan echo sonar transmitter in addition to the irregular ASDIC. This allowed the ship to maintain contact with targets even while firing unless a target was struck. Improved radar and direction-finding equipment improved the RCN's ability to find and track enemy submarines over the previous classes.

Canada originally ordered the construction of 33 frigates in October 1941. The design was too big for the shipyards on the Great Lakes so all the frigates built in Canada were built in dockyards along the west coast or along the St. Lawrence River. In all Canada ordered the construction of 60 frigates including ten for the Royal Navy that transferred two to the United States Navy.

== War service ==
After arriving at Halifax, Nova Scotia, St. Catharines was assigned to the Mid-Ocean Escort Force group C-2 as a trans-Atlantic convoy escort in November 1943. Beginning in February 1944, she was made Senior Officer's Ship of the group, that title being retained until September of that year.

On 6 March 1944, St. Catharines, along with the corvettes HMCS Fennel and HMCS Chilliwack, HMS Kenilworth Castle and destroyers HMS Icarus, HMCS Chaudiere and HMCS Gatineau, took part in the assault on U-744. The attack on the U-boat took over thirty hours and only then was U-744 driven to the surface. Attempts to tow the submarine was made, however they failed and Icarus torpedoed and sank the abandoned submarine. It must be said that not all the ships attacked the submarine at the same time as Gatineau and Kenilworth Castle both had to leave the fight after developing mechanical defects.

In October 1944 St. Catharines returned to Canada to undergo a refit at Shelburne, Nova Scotia. This lasted until December 1944. After working up in Bermuda, she returned only to begin a tropicalization refit in preparation for service in the southern Pacific Ocean. This meant installing water-cooling and refrigeration abilities and changing the camouflage pattern. The refit was completed in August 1945, however Japan had surrendered and she was paid off on 18 November 1945 and laid up.

== Postwar service ==
St. Catharines was sold to Marine Industries Ltd. in 1947. In 1950 Canada became responsible for operating weather ship P (Peter) in the Northern Pacific Ocean. As a result, the Government of Canada re-acquired St. Catharines and her sister ship HMCS Stone Town and sent them for conversion to weather ships at Sorel, Quebec. They were repainted with black hulls and white superstructures and buff funnels with black tops, and sent out to the position of weather ship P as CGS St. Catharines and CGS Stone Town respectively. Once at that position they were to provide positional information for long range, propeller flights over the Pacific and weather forecasting and measurement of winds aloft. In 1962, she was transferred to the newly formed Canadian Coast Guard and repainted in their colours. She remained at this post until 1967 when she was relieved by CGS Vancouver. She was broken up in Japan in 1968.
