= HMCS Stone Town =

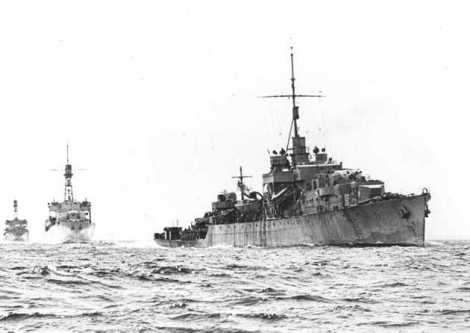
- HMCS Stone Town

History

Canada
- Name: Stone Town
- Namesake: St. Marys, Ontario
- Operator: Royal Canadian Navy
- Ordered: 1 February 1943
- Builder: Canadian Vickers Ltd. Montreal
- Laid down: 17 November 1943
- Launched: 28 March 1944
- Commissioned: 21 July 1944
- Decommissioned: 13 November 1945
- Identification: pennant number: K 531
- Honours and awards: Atlantic 1944–45
- Fate: Converted to Weather ship 1950

General characteristics
- Class & type: River-class frigate
- Displacement: 1,445 long tons (1,468 t; 1,618 short tons); 2,110 long tons (2,140 t; 2,360 short tons) (deep load)
- Length: 283 ft (86.26 m) p/p; 301.25 ft (91.82 m) o/a
- Beam: 36.5 ft (11.13 m)
- Draught: 9 ft (2.74 m); 13 ft (3.96 m) (deep load)
- Propulsion: 2 x Admiralty 3-drum boilers, 2 shafts, reciprocating vertical triple expansion, 5,500 ihp (4,100 kW)
- Speed: 20 knots (37.0 km/h); 20.5 knots (38.0 km/h) (turbine ships)
- Range: 646 long tons (656 t; 724 short tons) oil fuel; 7,500 nautical miles (13,890 km) at 15 knots (27.8 km/h)
- Complement: 157
- Armament: 2 × QF 4 in (102 mm) /45 Mk. XVI on twin mount HA/LA Mk.XIX; 1 × QF 12 pdr (3 in (76 mm)) 12 cwt /40 Mk. V on mounting HA/LA Mk.IX (not all ships); 8 × 20 mm QF Oerlikon A/A on twin mounts Mk.V; 1 × Hedgehog 24 spigot A/S projector; up to 150 depth charges

HMCS Stone Town was a River-class frigate that served with the Royal Canadian Navy during the Second World War. She served primarily as a convoy escort in the Battle of the Atlantic. She was named for St. Marys, Ontario, however there was already a ship by that name within the Commonwealth navies so they chose the nickname of the town for its representation. After the war she was re-purposed as a weather ship for use by the Department of Transport of Canada.

Stone Town was ordered 1 February 1943 as part of the 1943–1944 River-class building program. She was laid down on 17 November 1943 by Canadian Vickers Ltd. at Montreal, Quebec and launched 28 March 1944. She was commissioned into the Royal Canadian Navy on 21 July 1944 at Montreal.

== Background ==
The River-class frigate was designed by William Reed of Smith's Dock Company of South Bank-on-Tees. Originally called a "twin-screw corvette", its purpose was to improve on the convoy escort classes in service with the Royal Navy at the time, including the Flower-class corvette. The first orders were placed by the Royal Navy in 1940 and the vessels were named for rivers in the United Kingdom, giving name to the class. In Canada they were named for towns and cities though they kept the same designation. The name "frigate" was suggested by Vice-Admiral Percy Nelles of the Royal Canadian Navy and was adopted later that year.

Improvements over the corvette design included improved accommodation which was markedly better. The twin engines gave only three more knots of speed but extended the range of the ship to nearly double that of a corvette at 7,200 nautical miles (13,300 km) at 12 knots. Among other lessons applied to the design was an armament package better designed to combat U-boats including a twin 4-inch mount forward and 12-pounder aft. 15 Canadian frigates were initially fitted with a single 4-inch gun forward but with the exception of HMCS Valleyfield, they were all eventually upgraded to the double mount. For underwater targets, the River-class frigate was equipped with a Hedgehog anti-submarine mortar and depth charge rails aft and four side-mounted throwers.

River-class frigates were the first Royal Canadian Navy warships to carry the 147B Sword horizontal fan echo sonar transmitter in addition to the irregular ASDIC. This allowed the ship to maintain contact with targets even while firing unless a target was struck. Improved radar and direction-finding equipment improved the Royal Canadian Navy's ability to find and track enemy submarines over the previous classes.

Canada originally ordered the construction of 33 frigates in October 1941. The design was too big for the shipyards on the Great Lakes so all the frigates built in Canada were built in dockyards along the west coast or along the St. Lawrence River. In all Canada ordered the construction of 60 frigates including ten for the Royal Navy that transferred two to the United States Navy.

== War service ==
Beginning in September 1944, Stone Town performed workups in Bermuda. Upon her return she was assigned to the Mid-Ocean Escort Force group C-8 as a trans-Atlantic convoy escort. She was named Senior Officer's Ship and remained with the group crossing the Atlantic until May 1945, returning to Canada that month.

On 22 July 1945 Stone Town began a tropicalization refit at Lunenburg in preparation for service in the southern Pacific Ocean. This meant installing water-cooling and refrigeration abilities and changing the camouflage pattern. However, work was stopped on 24 August due to the surrender of Japan. Stone Town was paid off on 13 November 1945 at Lunenburg and laid up for disposal at Shelburne.

== Postwar service ==
In 1950 Canada became responsible for operating weather ship P (Papa) in the Northern Pacific Ocean. As a result, the Government of Canada re-acquired Stone Town and her sister ship HMCS St. Catharines and sent them for conversion to weather ships at Sorel, Quebec. They were repainted with black hulls and white superstructures and buff funnels with black tops, and sent out to the position of weather ship P as CGS St. Catharines and CGS Stone Town respectively. Once at that position they were to provide positional information for long range, propeller flights over the Pacific and weather forecasting and measurement of winds aloft. In 1962, she was transferred to the newly formed Canadian Coast Guard and repainted in their colours. She remained at this post until 1967 when she was relieved by CGS Quadra. She was sold in 1968, supposedly for conversion to a fishing vessel. Her ship's bell was given to St. Marys, Ontario and is currently on display at the St. Marys Museum.
