= Morton Engineering and Dry Dock Company =

Canadian shipbuilding company

- Industry: Shipbuilding
- Founded: 1858
- Founder: Alex Mackay & Company
- Defunct: 1949
- Headquarters: Quebec City, Quebec, Canada
- Products: Cargo ships, Naval vessels

Morton Engineering and Dry Dock Company was a shipbuilding company from Quebec City, Quebec. It was located in the Lower Town area of the city, along the Saint-Charles River. Founded in 1858, the shipyard stayed in operation until 1949, when it constructed its last ship. It built ships for the Royal Navy and Royal Canadian Navy during both world wars. In 1947, the company was renamed St. Lawrence Metal and Marine Works.

== History ==
Founded by Alex Mackay & Company in 1858, the shipyard was leased to Quebec Shipbuilding & Repairing Company during the First World War. The Royal Navy ordered two wooden freighters to be built at the shipyard during the war, both completed in 1918.

Between the wars, the shipyard changed hands. In 1919, it was purchased by W.J. Morton who changed the name of the shipyard to Quebec Docking & Ship Repairing Company in 1927 after incorporating it. In 1928 he changed it again, giving it its more well known name, Morton Engineering and Dry Dock Company. As part of his intention to make the yard bigger, he had a 2,500 ton marine railway installed. Following the installation, the shipyard offered ship repair, boiler making and general engineering services. In 1937, the shipyard received its first Royal Canadian Navy contract when a minesweeper, HMCS Gaspe was ordered for construction.

During the Second World War Morton Engineering constructed corvettes and frigates for the Royal and Royal Canadian Navies as part of the convoy escort construction programmes. This included some corvettes that were later transferred to the United States. In 1941, the St. Lawrence During the war the yard employed 2700 workers at its peak. This was beyond the capability of the yard's management and in 1943 the Canadian Government took over running the yard and operated it until the end of the war. The Morton yard was partnered with the George T. Davie & Sons Ltd. shipyard at Lauzon and the two operated a joint fitting out yard located in the Louise Basin. This was due to hull construction outpacing the fitting out of ships. This would lead to labour strife and in June 1943 a strike by the workers at the shipyards would slow production. Following this, the two yards were expropriated by the Canadian government and placed under the umbrella company, Quebec Shipyards Limited and remained under its control until the end of the war.

The yard was sold to Hervé Baribeau in 1946, renamed St. Lawrence Metal and Marine Works Ltd. Following the war it built cargo ships. The yard closed its doors in 1949.

== Yard limitations ==
The site of the yard limited its ability to launch larger ships. It was only the installation of the marine railway that allowed the shipyard to launch modern ships. The ships were pulled sideways from launching ways on the west side of the river onto a railway cradle and from there were lowered into the water. Canadian winters prevented the launching of ships from December to March.

To improve the yard's capability in building and launching large cargo ships during the Second World War, the river upstream from Morton Engineering was dredged in order to give room for newly launched larger cargo ships space to turn around. It was also dredged downstream in order to connect it to a channel that was navigable.
