= HMCS Valleyfield =

Canadian frigate

Coordinates: 46°03′N 52°24′W

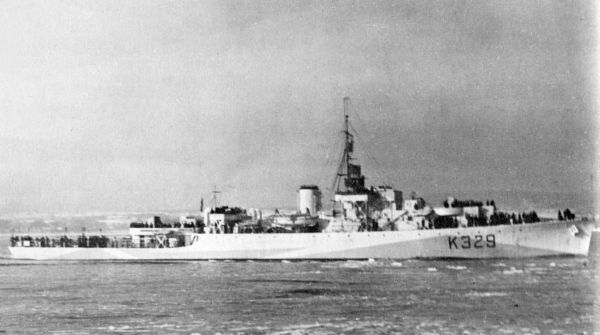
- HMCS Valleyfield

History

Canada
- Name: Valleyfield
- Namesake: Salaberry-de-Valleyfield, Quebec
- Ordered: October 1941
- Builder: Morton Engineering and Dry Dock Co., Quebec City
- Laid down: 30 November 1942
- Launched: 17 July 1943
- Commissioned: 7 December 1943
- Out of service: 7 May 1944
- Identification: Pennant number:K 329
- Honours and awards: Atlantic 1944
- Fate: Torpedoed and sunk on 7 May 1944.

General characteristics
- Class & type: River-class frigate
- Displacement: 1,445 long tons (1,468 t; 1,618 short tons); 2,110 long tons (2,140 t; 2,360 short tons) (deep load)
- Length: 283 ft (86.26 m) p/p; 301.25 ft (91.82 m) o/a
- Beam: 36.5 ft (11.13 m)
- Draught: 9 ft (2.74 m); 13 ft (3.96 m) (deep load)
- Propulsion: 2 x Admiralty 3-drum boilers, 2 shafts, reciprocating vertical triple expansion, 5,500 ihp (4,100 kW)
- Speed: 20 knots (37.0 km/h); 20.5 knots (38.0 km/h) (turbine ships)
- Range: 646 long tons (656 t; 724 short tons) oil fuel; 7,500 nautical miles (13,890 km) at 15 knots (27.8 km/h)
- Complement: 157
- Armament: 2 × QF 4 in (102 mm) /45 Mk. XVI on twin mount HA/LA Mk.XIX; 1 × QF 12 pdr (3 in (76 mm)) 12 cwt /40 Mk. V on mounting HA/LA Mk.IX (not all ships); 8 × 20 mm QF Oerlikon A/A on twin mounts Mk.V; 1 × Hedgehog 24 spigot A/S projector; up to 150 depth charges

HMCS Valleyfield was a River-class frigate that served with the Royal Canadian Navy during the Second World War. She served primarily as a convoy escort in the Battle of the Atlantic. She was torpedoed and sunk in May 1944, the only River-class frigate lost by the RCN. She was named for Salaberry-de-Valleyfield, Quebec.

Valleyfield was ordered in October 1941 as part of the 1942–1943 River-class building program. She was laid down on 30 November 1942 by Morton Engineering and Dry Dock Co. at Quebec City and launched 17 July 1943. She was commissioned into the RCN on 7 December 1943 at Quebec City.

== Background ==
The River-class frigate was designed by William Reed of Smith's Dock Company of South Bank-on-Tees. Originally called a "twin-screw corvette", its purpose was to improve on the convoy escort classes in service with the Royal Navy at the time, including the Flower-class corvette. The first orders were placed by the Royal Navy in 1940 and the vessels were named for rivers in the United Kingdom, giving name to the class. In Canada they were named for towns and cities though they kept the same designation. The name "frigate" was suggested by Vice-Admiral Percy Nelles of the Royal Canadian Navy and was adopted later that year.

Improvements over the corvette design included improved accommodation which was markedly better. The twin engines gave only three more knots of speed but extended the range of the ship to nearly double that of a corvette at 7,200 nautical miles (13,300 km) at 12 knots. Among other lessons applied to the design was an armament package better designed to combat U-boats including a twin 4-inch mount forward and 12-pounder aft. 15 Canadian frigates were initially fitted with a single 4-inch gun forward but with the exception of Valleyfield, they were all eventually upgraded to the double mount. For underwater targets, the River-class frigate was equipped with a Hedgehog anti-submarine mortar and depth charge rails aft and four side-mounted throwers.

River-class frigates were the first Royal Canadian Navy warships to carry the 147B Sword horizontal fan echo sonar transmitter in addition to the irregular ASDIC. This allowed the ship to maintain contact with targets even while firing unless a target was struck. Improved radar and direction-finding equipment improved the RCN's ability to find and track enemy submarines over the previous classes.

Canada originally ordered the construction of 33 frigates in October 1941. The design was too big for the locks on the Lachine Canal so it was not built by the shipyards on the Great Lakes and therefore all the frigates built in Canada were built in dockyards along the West Coast or along the St. Lawrence River below Montreal. In all Canada ordered the construction of 60 frigates including ten for the Royal Navy that transferred two to the United States Navy.

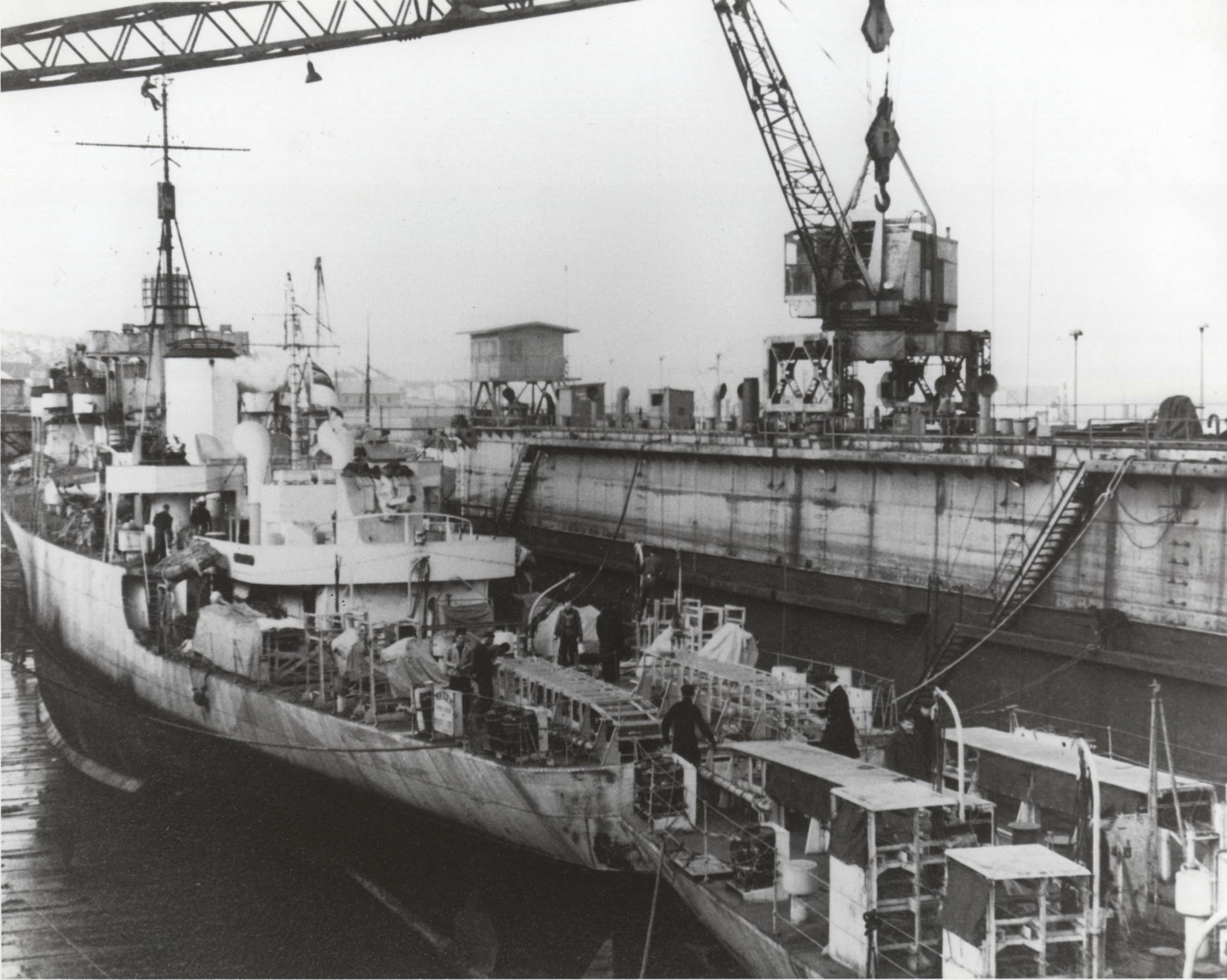
Valleyfield in harbour

== War service ==
After beginning in St. Margaret's Bay, Valleyfield completed working up in Bermuda. Upon her return in February 1944, she was assigned to the Mid-Ocean Escort Force escort group C-1 as a trans-Atlantic convoy escort. While en route to joining her group in the United Kingdom, she was detached to escort the convoy rescue ship Dundee and her tug to Horta in the Azores. From Horta, Valleyfield escorted HMCS Mulgrave and her tug to the United Kingdom. Valleyfield then made one more round-trip before her sinking.

=== Sinking ===
After parting company with convoy ONM 234 on 7 May 1944, escort group C-1 was making their way to St. John's when U-548 fired two GNATs, acoustic torpedoes, at the five ships. One of the torpedoes hit the port side boiler room on Valleyfield, splitting her in two. She sank in under four minutes. She had been travelling astern of the group and it took some time for the rest of the escorts to realize that Valleyfield had been sunk. Valleyfield and escort group C-1 had not been zig-zagging for several hours even though the conditions for attack by submarine were favourable. Eventually HMCS Giffard returned to pick up survivors while the other members of the group HMCS Edmundston, HMCS Frontenac and HMCS Halifax searched unsuccessfully for the U-boat. 43 survivors were rescued from the water, of whom 5 died later. Some criticism was directed at Giffard which, though following procedure at the time, had hesitated before rescuing survivors. This may have increased the number of casualties.
