= List of River-class frigates =

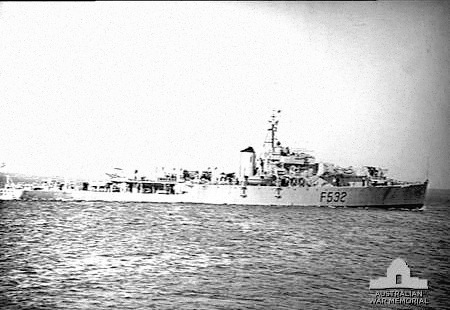
A River-class frigate, HMAS Macquarie (K532) circa 1952.

The River class was a ship class of British-designed frigates built and operated during World War II. One hundred and fifty-one frigates were built, and these were operated by seven different nations during the war.

== Royal Navy ==
Royal Navy (Group I)
Ship	Pennant number	Builder	Laid down	Launched	Commissioned	Paid off	Fate
HMS Ballinderry	K255	Blyth Shipbuilding & Drydock, Blyth	6 November 1941	7 December 1942	2 September 1943	1945	reserve 1947, refit in Liverpool 1951, 7 July 1961 sold for scrap.
HMS Bann	K256	Charles Hill & Sons, Bristol	18 June 1942	29 December 1942	7 May 1943	5 December 1945	Transferred to India as HMIS Tir.
HMS Chelmer	K221	George Brown & Company, Greenock	29 December 1941	27 March 1943	29 September 1943		Scrapped, August 1957.
HMS Dart	K21	Blyth Shipbuilding & Drydock, Blyth	8 September 1941	10 October 1942	15 May 1943		Sold for scrap, November 1956; scrapped, 1957.
HMS Derg	K257	Henry Robb, Leith	16 April 1942	7 January 1943	10 June 1943		Transferred in 1951 to RNVR as drill ship Wessex, later Cambria; scrapped at Cashmore, Newport, September 1960.
HMS Ettrick	K254	John Crown & Sons, Sunderland	31 December 1941	5 February 1943	11 July 1943		Transferred to RCN as HMCS Ettrick, 29 January 1944. Returned to RN, 30 May 1945. Scrapped, June 1953.
HMS Exe	K92	Fleming & Ferguson, Paisley	16 May 1941	19 March 1942	6 August 1942		Placed in reserve 1946–1955. Sold for scrap, 20 September 1956; scrapped at Preston.
HMS Itchen	K227	Fleming & Ferguson, Paisley	14 July 1941	29 July 1942	28 December 1942	23 September 1943	Torpedoed and sunk by U-666 at 53-25N, 39-42W, 23 September 1943. 227 crew were killed, including survivors from other ships rescued by Itchen.
HMS Jed	K235	Charles Hill & Sons, Bristol	27 September 1941	30 July 1942	30 November 1942		Placed in reserve, 1946. Scrapped at Milford Haven, 25 May 1957.
HMS Kale	K241	A & J Inglis, Glasgow	22 September 1941	24 June 1942	4 December 1942		Sold, November 1956; scrapped at Newport, 1957.
HMS Ness	K219	Henry Robb, Leith	3 September 1941	30 July 1942	22 December 1942		Sold for scrap, September 1956.
HMS Nith	K215	Henry Robb, Leith	5 September 1941	25 September 1942	16 February 1943		Transferred to Egypt as Domiat, November 1948. Sunk by HMS Newfoundland (59) during the Suez Crisis on 31 October 1956.
HMS Ribble	K251	W Simons & Co, Renfrew	29 December 1942	23 April 1943			Transferred while under construction to the Netherlands as HNLMS Johan Maurits van Nassau.
HMS Rother	K224	Smiths Dock Co, South Bank-on-Tees	26 June 1941	20 November 1941	3 April 1942		Sank U-134 (Type VIIC) (48 dead, no survivors) in the Bay of Biscay, 27 August 1943. Scrapped, 22 Apr 1955.
HMS Spey	K246	Smiths Dock Co, South Bank-on-Tees	18 July 1941	18 December 1941	19 May 1942		Transferred to Egypt as Rasheed, November 1948; scrapped 1994.
HMS Swale	K217	Smiths Dock Co, South Bank-on-Tees	19 August 1941	16 January 1942	24 June 1942		Transferred to South Africa as HMSAS Swale, 26 July 1945. Returned to RN, January 1946. Scrapped, 26 February 1955.
HMS Tay	K232	Smiths Dock Co, South Bank-on-Tees	10 September 1941	18 March 1942	5 August 1942		Scrapped, 28 September 1956.
HMS Test	K239	Hall, Russell & Company, Aberdeen	15 August 1941	30 May 1942	12 October 1942		Transferred to India as HMIS Neza, 1946. Returned to the RN, April 1947. She then served as an accommodation ship in Singapore from 1948. In 1949, she was loaned to the newly created Malayan Naval Force (Royal Malaysian Navy) as a training frigate. Scrapped, 25 February 1955.
HMS Teviot	K222	Hall, Russell & Company, Aberdeen	4 October 1941	12 October 1942	30 January 1943		Transferred to South Africa as HMSAS Teviot, 10 June 1945. Returned to RN, January 1946. Scrapped, 29 March 1955.
HMS Trent	K243	Charles Hill & Sons, Bristol	31 January 1942	10 October 1942	27 February 1943		Transferred to India as HMIS Kukri, April 1946.
HMS Tweed	K250	A & J Inglis, Glasgow	31 December 1941	24 November 1942	28 April 1943	7 January 1944	Torpedoed and sunk by U-305 southwest of Ireland at 48-18N, 21-19W, 7 January 1944. Survivors were rescued by HMS Nene.
HMS Waveney	K248	Smiths Dock Co, South Bank-on-Tees	8 October 1941	30 April 1942	16 September 1942		Scrapped, December 1957.
HMS Wear	K230	Smiths Dock Co, South Bank-on-Tees	16 October 1941	1 June 1942	24 October 1942		Scrapped, 29 December 1957.

Royal Navy (Group II)
Ship	Pennant number	Builder	Laid down	Launched	Commissioned	Paid off	Fate
HMS Adur	K296	Canadian Vickers, Montreal	10 March 1942	22 August 1942			Transferred to USN before completion as USS Asheville (PG-101).
HMS Aire	K262	Fleming & Ferguson, Paisley	12 June 1942	22 April 1943	28 July 1943		Renamed as base ship HMSTamar, 1946. Reverted to HMS Aire; it ran aground on Bombay Reef near Paracel Islands off Hainan Island, December 1946.
HMS Annan	K297	Canadian Vickers, Montreal	16 March 1942	12 September 1942			Transferred to RCN before completion as HMCS Annan. Transferred to USN as USS Natchez (PG-102), 1942. Transferred to Dominican Navy as Juan Pablo Duarte, 1947.
HMS Annan	K404	Hall, Russell & Company, Aberdeen	10 June 1943	29 December 1943			Transferred to RCN before completion as HMCS Annan. Returned to RN, 20 June 1945. Transferred to Denmark as HDMS Niels Ebbesen, 27 November 1945.
HMS Avon	K97	Charles Hill & Sons, Bristol	8 January 1943	19 June 1943	18 September 1943		Transferred to Portugal as NRP Nuno Tristão, 1949.
HMS Awe	K526	Fleming & Ferguson, Paisley	27 May 1943	28 December 1943	21 April 1944		Transferred to Portugal as NRP Diogo Gomes, 1949.
HMS Barle	K298	Canadian Vickers, Montreal	29 April 1942	26 September 1942	30 April 1943	27 February 1946	Ordered by USN as PG-103. Transferred to RN before completion under Lend-Lease. Returned to USN as PG-103, 27 February 1946.
HMS Braid	K263	W Simons & Co, Renfrew	1 December 1942	30 November 1943		21 January 1944	Transferred to Free French Navy as L'Aventure, 21 January 1944.
HMS Cam	K264	George Brown & Company, Greenock	30 June 1942	31 July 1943	31 January 1944	22 June 1945	Badly damaged during a coordinated depth charge attack on a possible submerged U-boat off St. Catherine's Point, injuring 46 crew, 18 July 1944. Towed by HMCS Cape Breton to Yarmouth, then by tug to Portsmouth. Declared to be total loss and scrapped at Sunderland, July 1945.
HMS Cuckmere	K299	Canadian Vickers, Montreal	11 May 1942	24 October 1942	14 May 1943		Ordered by USN as PG-104. Transferred to RN before completion under Lend-Lease. Torpedoed and badly damaged by U-223 off Algeria and was declared a total loss. Returned to USN as PG-104, 6 November 1946.
HMS Deveron	K265	Smiths Dock Co, South Bank-on-Tees	16 April 1942	12 October 1942	2 March 1943	1945	Transferred to India as HMIS Dhanush, 1945.
HMS Dovey	K523	Fleming & Ferguson, Paisley	23 March 1943	14 October 1943	25 February 1944		Scrapped, 2 November 1955.
HMS Evenlode	K300	Canadian Vickers, Montreal	28 May 1942	9 November 1942	4 June 1943		Ordered by USN as USS Danville (PG-105). Transferred to RN before completion under Lend-Lease. Returned to USN, 5 March 1946.
HMS Fal	K266	Smiths Dock Co, South Bank-on-Tees	20 May 1942	9 November 1942	2 July 1943	25 May 1947	Loaned to Burma, 25 May 1947. Transferred to Burma as UBS Mayu, 29 August 1948.
HMS Findhorn	K301	Canadian Vickers, Montreal	25 August 1942	5 December 1942	25 June 1943		Ordered by USN as PG-106. Transferred to RN before completion under Lend-Lease. Returned to USN, 20 March 1946. Participated (with Indian sloop HMIS Godavari) in the sinking of U-198 (Type IXD2) (66 dead, no survivors) near Seychelles, 12 August 1944.
HMS Frome	K267	Blyth Shipbuilding & Drydock, Blyth	30 May 1942	1 June 1943			Transferred to Free French Navy as L'Escarmouche, 3 March 1944 .
HMS Glenarm	K258	Henry Robb, Leith	8 March 1943	30 July 1943	25 September 1944		Sank U-boat, in concert with HMS Wanderer, on 17 January 1944: Possibly U-305 or U-377. Renamed HMS Strule, 1 February 1944. Transferred to Free French Navy as Croix de Lorraine, 25 September 1944.
HMS Halladale	K417	A & J Inglis, Glasgow	25 June 1943	28 January 1944	11 May 1944		Sold to Townsend Brothers as ferry Halladale, 1 April 1949; renamed Norden, 1962, then Turist Expressen, 1962.
HMS Helford	K252	Hall, Russell & Company, Aberdeen	27 June 1942	6 February 1943	26 June 1943		Scrapped, 29 June 1956.
HMS Helmsdale	K253	A & J Inglis, Glasgow	13 August 1942	5 June 1943	15 October 1943		Scrapped, 14 November 1957.
HMS Inver	K302	Canadian Vickers, Montreal	14 September 1942	12 December 1942	19 July 1943		Ordered by USN as PG-107. Transferred to RN before completion under Lend-Lease. Returned to USN, 4 March 1946.
HMS Lagan	K259	Smiths Dock Co, South Bank-on-Tees	7 January 1942	28 July 1942	21 December 1942	20 September 1943	Sank U-89 (Type VIIC) (48 dead, no survivor) with HMS Broadway and a Swordfish from HMS Biter, 12 May 1943. Sank U-753 (Type VIIC) (47 dead, no survivors) with HMCS Drumheller by depth charges, 13 May 1943. Torpedoed and badly damaged by U-270 while escorting Convoy ON 202, 20 September 1943. Towed to the United Kingdom and declared a total loss. Sold for scrap, 21 May 1946.
HMS Lochy	K365	Hall, Russell & Company, Aberdeen	23 February 1943	30 October 1943	8 February 1944		Scrapped at Troon, 29 June 1956.
HMS Lossie	K303	Canadian Vickers, Montreal	2 October 1942	30 April 1943	14 August 1943		Ordered by USN as PG-108. Transferred to RN before completion under Lend-Lease. Returned to USN, 26 January 1946.
HMS Meon	K269	A & J Inglis, Glasgow	31 December 1942	4 August 1943	7 February 1944		Transferred to RCN as HMCS Meon. Returned to RN, 23 April 1945. Scrapped, 14 May 1966.
HMS Monnow	K441	Charles Hill & Sons, Bristol	28 September 1943	4 December 1943	11 May 1944		Transferred to RCN as HMCS Monnow, 3 August 1944. Returned to RN, 11 June 1945. Transferred to Denmark as HDMS Holger Danske, 1945.
HMS Mourne	K261	Smiths Dock Co, South Bank-on-Tees	21 March 1942	24 September 1942	30 April 1943	15 June 1944	Torpedoed and sunk by U-767 in the English Channel at 49-35N, 05-30W, 15 June 1944.
HMS Moyola	K260	Smiths Dock Co, South Bank-on-Tees	9 February 1942	27 August 1942	15 January 1943	15 October 1944	Transferred to Free French Navy as Tonkinois, 15 October 1944.
HMS Nadder	K392	Smiths Dock Co, South Bank-on-Tees	11 March 1943	15 September 1943	20 January 1944	1945	Transferred to India as HMIS Shamsher, 1945.
HMS Nene	K270	Smiths Dock Co, South Bank-on-Tees	20 June 1942	9 December 1942	8 April 1943		Sank U-536 (Type IXC/40) (38 dead, 17 survivors) with HMCS Snowberry and HMCS Calgary by depth charges, 20 November 1943. Sank U-257 (Type VIIC) (30 dead, 19 survivors) with HMCS Waskesiu by depth charges, 24 February 1944. Transferred to RCN as HMCS Nene, 4 June 1944. Returned to RN, 11 June 1945. Scrapped, August 1955.
HMS Odzani	K356	Smiths Dock Co, South Bank-on-Tees	18 November 1942	19 May 1943	2 September 1943		Scrapped, June 1957.
HMS Parret	K304	Canadian Vickers, Montreal	6 November 1942	30 May 1943	31 August 1943		Ordered by USN as PG-109. Transferred to RN before completion under Lend-Lease. Returned to USN, 5 February 1946.
HMS Plym	K271	Smiths Dock Co, South Bank-on-Tees	1 August 1942	4 February 1943	16 May 1943		Destroyed off the Montebello Islands, Western Australia with the detonation of a 25 kilotons nuclear bomb in the hull as part of Operation Hurricane, the first British nuclear test, 3 October 1952.
HMS Ribble	K525	Blyth Shipbuilding & Drydock, Blyth	31 December 1942	10 November 1943			Transferred to RCN as HMCS Ribble, 24 July 1944. Returned to RN, 11 June 1945. Scrapped, 9 July 1957.
HMS Shiel	K305	Canadian Vickers, Montreal		26 May 1943	30 September 1943		Ordered by USN as PG-110. Transferred to RN before completion under Lend-Lease. Returned to USN as USS Shiel (PG-110), 4 March 1946.
HMS Taff	K637	Charles Hill & Sons, Bristol	14 May 1943	11 September 1943	7 January 1944		Scrapped, June 1957.
HMS Tavy	K272	Charles Hill & Sons, Bristol	17 October 1942	3 April 1943	3 July 1943		Sank U-390 (48 dead, 1 survivor) with HMS Wanderer by depth charges, 5 July 1944. Scrapped, 28 September 1956.
HMS Tees	K293	Hall, Russell & Company, Aberdeen	21 October 1942	20 May 1943	28 August 1943		Scrapped, 16 July 1956.
HMS Teme	K458	Smiths Dock Co, South Bank-on-Tees	25 May 1943	11 November 1943			Transferred to RCN as HMCS Teme, 28 February 1944. Torpedoed and badly damaged by U-315 off Lands End at 50-07N, 05-45W, 29 March 1945. Declared a total loss. Returned to RN, 4 May 1945. Sold for scrap, 8 December 1945.
HMS Torridge	K292	Blyth Shipbuilding & Drydock, Blyth	17 October 1942	16 August 1943		6 June 1944	Transferred to Free French Navy as La Surprise, 6 June 1944.
HMS Towy	K294	Smiths Dock Co, South Bank-on-Tees	3 September 1942	4 March 1943	10 June 1943		Scrapped, 27 July 1956.
HMS Usk	K295	Smiths Dock Co, South Bank-on-Tees	6 October 1942	3 April 1943	14 July 1943		Transferred to Egypt as Abikir, 1948.
HMS Windrush	K370	Henry Robb, Leith	18 November 1942	18 June 1943	3 November 1943	February 1944	Transferred to Free French Navy in October 1943 and named as Découverte in February 1944. In service with the French Navy until 1959. Beached fire training ship under the name of Lucifer II at Querqueville, France between 1967 and 2002.
HMS Wye	K371	Henry Robb, Leith	18 November 1942	16 August 1943	9 February 1944		Scrapped, 22 February 1955.

== Royal Australian Navy ==
Royal Australian Navy (Group I)
Ship	Pennant number	Builder	Laid down	Launched	Commissioned	Paid off	Fate
HMAS Barcoo	K375	Cockatoo Docks & Engineering Company, Sydney	21 October 1942	26 August 1943	17 January 1944	21 February 1964	Sold to N.W. Kennedy Ltd., Vancouver on 15 February 1972. Scrapped in Taiwan.
HMAS Barwon	K406	Cockatoo Docks & Engineering Company, Sydney		3 August 1943	12 January 1946	31 March 1947	Sold for scrap, 17 August 1962.
HMAS Burdekin	K376	Walkers, Maryborough		30 June 1943	27 June 1944	18 April 1946	Placed in reserve. Stricken on 9 November 1960. Sold to Tolo Mining & Smelting Co. Ltd., Hong Kong on 21 September 1961. Scrapped in Japan.
HMAS Diamantina	K377	Walkers, Maryborough	12 April 1943	6 April 1944	27 April 1945	21 February 1980	Preserved as a museum ship at Queensland Maritime Museum.
HMAS Gascoyne	K354	Mort's Dock & Engineering Company, Sydney	3 July 1942	20 February 1943	18 November 1943	1 February 1966	Sold for scrap, 15 February 1972.
HMAS Hawkesbury	K363	Mort's Dock & Engineering Company, Sydney	24 August 1942	24 July 1943	5 July 1944		Placed in reserve in May 1947, recommissioned in July 1952. Placed in reserve, 14 February 1955. Sold for scrap, 15 February 1972.
HMAS Lachlan	K364	Mort's Dock & Engineering Co, Sydney	22 March 1943	25 March 1944	14 February 1945	5 October 1949	Transferred to Royal New Zealand Navy as HMNZS Lachlan. Sold for scrap, February 1975.
HMAS Macquarie	K532	Mort's Dock & Engineering Company, Sydney		3 March 1945	7 December 1945		Sold for scrap, 5 July 1972.

Royal Australian Navy (Group II) – Modified River-class (or Bay-class) frigate
Ship	Pennant number	Builder	Laid down	Launched	Commissioned	Paid off	Fate
HMAS Balmain	J467						Cancelled, 12 June 1944.
HMAS Bogan	K09		17 January 1944				Cancelled, 4 April 1944.
HMAS Campaspe	K424						Cancelled, 4 April 1944.
HMAS Condamine	K698	State Dockyard, Newcastle	30 October 1943	4 November 1944	22 February 1946	2 December 1955	Served in the Korean War July 1952 – April 1953 and March 1955 – November 1955. Sold for scrap, September 1961.
HMAS Culgoa	K408	Williamstown Dockyard, Williamstown	15 July 1943	22 September 1944	1 April 1947		Sold for scrap, 15 February 1972.
HMAS Murchison	K442	Evans Deakin & Company, Brisbane	3 June 1943	3 March 1945	7 December 1945		Sold for scrap, 5 July 1972.
HMAS Murrumbidgee	K534						Cancelled, 4 April 1944.
HMAS Namoi	K55						Cancelled, 12 June 1944.
HMAS Nepean	J468						Cancelled, 12 June 1944.
HMAS Shoalhaven	K535	Walkers, Maryborough	18 December 1943	14 December 1944	2 May 1946	19 December 1954	Placed in reserve in 1954. Sold for scrap in January 1962.
HMAS Warburton	K533						Cancelled, 12 June 1944.
HMAS Williamstown	K66						Cancelled, 4 April 1944.
HMAS Wimmera	K86						Cancelled, 4 April 1944.
HMAS Wollondilly	K98						Cancelled, 12 June 1944.

== Royal Canadian Navy ==
Royal Canadian Navy
Ship	Pennant number	Builder	Laid down	Launched	Commissioned	Paid off	Fate
HMCS Alexandria		Canadian Vickers, Montreal					Cancelled, December 1943.
HMCS Alvington		Canadian Vickers, Montreal					Cancelled, December 1943.
HMCS Annan	K297	Canadian Vickers, Montreal	16 March 1942	12 September 1942			Formerly HMS Annan, transferred to RCN during construction. Transferred to USN during construction on 20 July 1942 as USS Natchez (PG-102).
HMCS Annan	K404	Hall, Russell & Co., Aberdeen	6 October 1943	29 December 1943	13 June 1944	20 June 1945	Formerly HMS Annan. Returned to RN, 20 June 1945. Sold to Denmark in November 1945 and renamed HDMS Niels Ebbesen; served in the Danish Navy until 8 May 1963. Scrapped at H J Hansen in Odense, 1963.
HMCS Antigonish	K661	Yarrows Ltd., Esquimalt	2 October 1943	10 February 1944	4 July 1944	2 May 1946	Placed in reserve. Recommissioned as a Prestonian-class frigate with pennant FFE 301, 12 October 1957.
HMCS Beacon Hill	K407	Yarrows Ltd., Esquimalt	16 July 1943	6 November 1943	16 May 1944	2 June 1946	Placed in reserve. Recommissioned as a Prestonian-class frigate with pennant FFE 303, 21 December 1957.
HMCS Buckingham	K685	Davie Shipbuilding & Repairing Co. Ltd., Lauzon	11 November 1943	28 April 1944	2 November 1944	16 November 1945	Placed in reserve. Recommissioned as a Prestonian-class frigate with pennant FFE 314, 25 June 1954.
HMCS Cap de la Madeleine	K663	Morton Engineering & Dry Dock Co., Quebec City	5 November 1943	13 May 1944	30 September 1944	25 November 1945	Placed in reserve. Recommissioned as a Prestonian-class frigate with pennant FFE 317, 7 December 1954.
HMCS Cape Breton	K350	Morton Engineering & Dry Dock Co., Quebec City	5 May 1942	24 November 1942	25 October 1943	26 January 1946	
HMCS Capilano	K409	Yarrows Ltd., Esquimalt	18 November 1943	8 April 1944	25 August 1944	24 November 1945	
HMCS Carlplace	K664	Davie Shipbuilding & Repairing Co. Ltd., Lauzon	30 November 1943	6 July 1944	13 December 1944	13 November 1945	Transferred to the Dominican Republic as Presidente Trujillo, later Mella.
HMCS Charlottetown	K244	G T Davie, Lauzon	26 January 1943	16 September 1943	28 April 1944	25 March 1947	
HMCS Chebogue	K317	Yarrows Ltd., Esquimalt	19 March 1943	17 August 1943	22 February 1944	25 September 1945	Torpedoed and badly damaged by U-1227 while escorting Convoy ONS 33, 4 October 1944. Towed to Port Talbot and declared a total loss.
HMCS Coaticook	K410	Davie Shipbuilding & Repairing Co. Ltd., Lauzon	14 June 1943	26 November 1943	25 July 1944	29 November 1945	
HMCS Dunver	K03	Morton Engineering & Dry Dock Co., Quebec City	3 May 1942	10 November 1942	11 September 1943	23 January 1946	
HMCS Eastview	K665	Canadian Vickers, Montreal	26 August 1943	17 November 1943	3 June 1944	17 January 1946	
HMCS Ettrick	K254	John Crown & Sons Ltd., Sunderland	31 December 1941	5 February 1943	29 January 1944	30 May 1945	Formerly HMS Ettrick. Returned to RN, 30 May 1945.
HMCS Fort Erie							Cancelled, December 1943.
HMCS Fort Erie	K670	G T Davie, Lauzon	3 November 1943	27 May 1944	27 October 1944	22 November 1945	Placed in reserve. Recommissioned as a Prestonian-class frigate with pennant FFE 312, 17 April 1956.
HMCS Foster		Davie Shipbuilding & Repairing Co. Ltd., Lauzon					Cancelled, December 1943.
HMCS Glace Bay	K414	G T Davie, Lauzon	23 September 1943	26 April 1944	2 September 1944	17 November 1945	Transferred to Chile as Esmeralda, 1946; later Baquedano.
HMCS Grou	K518	Canadian Vickers, Montreal	1 May 1943	7 August 1943	4 December 1943	25 February 1946	
HMCS Hallowell	K666	Canadian Vickers, Montreal	22 November 1943	28 March 1944	8 August 1944	7 November 1945	Transferred to Israel as INS Miznak, 1949; sold to Royal Ceylon Navy as HMCyS Gajabahu, 1952.
HMCS Hardrock		Canadian Vickers, Montreal					Cancelled, December 1943.
HMCS Henryville		Davie Shipbuilding & Repairing Co. Ltd., Lauzon					Cancelled, December 1943.
HMCS Inch Arran	K667	Davie Shipbuilding & Repairing Co. Ltd., Lauzon	25 October 1943	6 June 1944	18 November 1944	28 November 1945	Placed in reserve. Recommissioned as a Prestonian-class frigate with pennant FFE 308, 23 August 1954.
HMCS Joliette	K418	Morton Engineering & Dry Dock Co., Quebec City	19 July 1943	12 November 1943	14 June 1944	19 November 1945	Transferred to Chile as Iquique, 1946.
HMCS Jonquiere	K318	G T Davie, Lauzon	26 January 1943	28 October 1943	10 May 1944	4 December 1945	Placed in reserve. Recommissioned as a Prestonian-class frigate with pennant FFE 318, 20 September 1954.
HMCS Kirkland Lake	K337	Morton Engineering & Dry Dock Co., Quebec City	16 November 1943	27 April 1944	21 August 1944	14 December 1945	
HMCS Kokanee	K419	Yarrows Ltd., Esquimalt	25 August 1943	27 November 1943	6 June 1944	21 December 1945	Sold commercial 1949
HMCS La Hulloise	K668	Canadian Vickers, Montreal	10 August 1943	29 October 1943	20 May 1944	6 December 1945	Placed in reserve. Recommissioned as a Prestonian-class frigate with pennant FFE 305, 9 October 1957.
HMCS Lanark	K669	Canadian Vickers, Montreal	25 September 1943	10 December 1943	6 July 1944	24 October 1945	Placed in reserve. Recommissioned as a Prestonian-class frigate with pennant FFE 321, 15 April 1956.
HMCS Lasalle	K519	Davie Shipbuilding & Repairing Co. Ltd., Lauzon	4 June 1943	11 December 1943	29 June 1944	17 December 1945	
HMCS Lauzon	K371	G T Davie, Lauzon	2 July 1943	10 June 1944	30 August 1944	7 November 1945	Placed in reserve. Recommissioned as a Prestonian-class frigate with pennant FFE 322, 12 December 1953.
HMCS Le Havre		Yarrows Ltd., Esquimalt					Cancelled, December 1943.
HMCS Levis	K400	G T Davie, Lauzon	25 February 1943	26 November 1943	21 July 1944	21 February 1946	Sunk as breakwater along east coast of Vancouver Island.
HMCS Lingabar		Canadian Vickers, Montreal					Cancelled, December 1943.
HMCS Longueuil	K672	Canadian Vickers, Montreal	17 July 1943	30 October 1943	18 May 1944	31 December 1945	
HMCS Magog	K673	Canadian Vickers, Montreal	16 June 1943	22 September 1943	7 May 1944	20 December 1944	Torpedoed and badly damaged by U-1223 while escorting Convoy ONS 33G in Gulf of St. Lawrence, 14 October 1944. Lost 65 feet (20 m) off the stern and 3 crew were killed. Towed to Quebec City and declared a total loss.
HMCS Matane	K444	Canadian Vickers, Montreal	23 December 1942	29 May 1943	22 October 1943	2 November 1946	Used as a breakwater in between Courtney, B.C. and Campbell River, B.C. in an area commonly known as Oyster River. A few remains are seen at times, depending on the tidal action.
HMCS Megantic		Davie Shipbuilding & Repairing Co. Ltd., Lauzon					Cancelled, December 1943.
HMCS Meon	K269	A. & J. Inglis Ltd., Glasgow	31 December 1942	4 August 1943	2 July 1944	23 April 1945	Formerly HMS Meon. Returned to RN, 23 April 1945.
HMCS Merittonia		Davie Shipbuilding & Repairing Co. Ltd., Lauzon					Cancelled, December 1943.
HMCS Monnow	K441	Charles Hill & Sons Ltd., Bristol	28 September 1943	4 December 1943	3 August 1944	11 June 1945	Formerly HMS Monnow. Returned to RN, 11 June 1945. Sold to Denmark and renamed HDMS Holger Danske, October 1945. Served in the Danish Navy until 1960. Scrapped by H J Hansen in Odense, 1960.
HMCS Montreal	K319	Canadian Vickers, Montreal	23 December 1942	12 June 1943	12 November 1943	15 October 1945	Sold, 1947; scrapped in Sydney, NS
HMCS Nene	K270	Smiths Dock Co., South Bank-on-Tees	20 June 1942	9 December 1942	4 June 1944	11 June 1945	Formerly HMS Nene. Returned to RN, 11 June 1945.
HMCS New Glasgow	K320	Yarrows Ltd., Esquimalt	2 December 1942	23 June 1943	23 December 1943	4 November 1945	Placed in reserve. Recommissioned as a Prestonian-class frigate with pennant FFE 315, 30 January 1954.
HMCS New Waterford	K321	Yarrows Ltd., Esquimalt	17 December 1942	3 July 1943	21 January 1944	7 March 1946	Placed in reserve. Recommissioned as a Prestonian-class frigate with pennant FFE 304, 31 January 1958.
HMCS Northumberland		Yarrows Ltd., Esquimalt					Cancelled, December 1943.
HMCS Orkney	K448	Yarrows Ltd., Esquimalt	19 May 1943	18 September 1943	18 April 1944	22 January 1946	Transferred to Israel as INS Mivtakh, 1950; sold to Royal Ceylon Navy as HMCyS Mahasena, 1952.
HMCS Outremont	K322	Morton Engineering & Dry Dock Co., Quebec City	18 November 1942	3 July 1943	27 November 1943	5 November 1945	Placed in reserve. Recommissioned as a Prestonian-class frigate with pennant FFE 310, 2 September 1955.
HMCS Penetang	K676	Davie Shipbuilding & Repairing Co. Ltd., Lauzon	22 September 1943	6 July 1944	19 October 1944	10 November 1945	Placed in reserve. Recommissioned as a Prestonian-class frigate with pennant FFE 316, 1 June 1954.
HMCS Pesaquid		Yarrows Ltd., Esquimalt					Cancelled, December 1943.
HMCS Plessisville		Davie Shipbuilding & Repairing Co. Ltd., Lauzon					Cancelled, December 1943.
HMCS Port Colborne	K326	Yarrows Ltd., Esquimalt	16 December 1942	21 April 1943	5 December 1943	7 November 1945	
HMCS Poundmaker	K675	Canadian Vickers, Montreal	29 January 1944	21 April 1944	17 September 1944	25 November 1945	Transferred to Peru as BAP Teniente Ferré, later renamed BAP Ferré.
HMCS Prestonian	K662	Davie Shipbuilding & Repairing Co. Ltd., Lauzon	20 July 1943	22 June 1944	13 September 1944	24 April 1956	Placed in reserve. Recommissioned as a Prestonian-class frigate with pennant FFE 307, 22 August 1953.
HMCS Prince Rupert	K324	Yarrows Ltd., Esquimalt	1 August 1942	3 February 1943	30 August 1943	15 January 1946	Sunk as breakwater at Royston, British Columbia.
HMCS Ranney Falls		Davie Shipbuilding & Repairing Co. Ltd., Lauzon					Cancelled, December 1943.
HMCS Ribble	K525	Blyth Shipbuilding & Drydock, Blyth	31 December 1942	10 November 1943	24 July 1944	11 June 1945	Formerly HMS Ribble. Returned to RN, 11 June 1945.
HMCS Rouyn		Davie Shipbuilding & Repairing Co. Ltd., Lauzon					Cancelled, December 1943.
HMCS Royal Mount	K677	Canadian Vickers, Montreal	7 January 1944	15 April 1944	25 August 1944	17 November 1945	
HMCS Runnymede	K678	Canadian Vickers, Montreal	11 September 1943	27 November 1943	14 June 1944	19 January 1946	
HMCS Saint John	K456	Canadian Vickers, Montreal	28 May 1943	25 August 1943	13 December 1943	27 November 1945	
HMCS Sea Cliff	K344	Davie Shipbuilding & Repairing Co. Ltd., Lauzon	20 July 1943	7 August 1944	26 September 1944	28 November 1945	Transferred to Chile as Covadonga, 1946.
HMCS Shipton		Davie Shipbuilding & Repairing Co. Ltd., Lauzon					Cancelled, December 1943.
HMCS Springhill	K323	Yarrows Ltd., Esquimalt	5 May 1943	7 September 1943	21 March 1944	1 December 1945	
HMCS St. Agathe		Davie Shipbuilding & Repairing Co. Ltd., Lauzon					Cancelled, December 1943.
HMCS St. Catharines	K325	Yarrows Ltd., Esquimalt	May 1942 6/12/1942 7/1943	12 June 1942	July 1943		Placed in reserve. Recommissioned as a Prestonian-class frigate with pennant FFE 324.
HMCS St. Eduoard		Davie Shipbuilding & Repairing Co. Ltd., Lauzon					Cancelled, December 1943.
HMCS St. Pierre	K680	Davie Shipbuilding & Repairing Co. Ltd., Lauzon	30 June 1943	1 December 1943	28 August 1944	22 November 1945	Transferred to Peru as BAP Teniente Palacios, 1947; later renamed BAP Palacios.
HMCS St. Romauld		Davie Shipbuilding & Repairing Co. Ltd., Lauzon					Cancelled, December 1943.
HMCS St. Stephen	K454	Yarrows Ltd., Esquimalt	5 October 1943	6 February 1944	28 July 1944	30 January 1946	
HMCS Ste. Therese	K366	Davie Shipbuilding & Repairing Co. Ltd., Lauzon	18 May 1943	16 October 1943	28 May 1944	2 November 1945	Placed in reserve. Recommissioned as a Prestonian-class frigate with pennant FFE 309, 21 January 1955.
HMCS Stettler	K681	Canadian Vickers, Montreal	31 May 1943	9 October 1943	7 May 1944	9 November 1945	Placed in reserve. Recommissioned as a Prestonian-class frigate with pennant FFE 311, 2 February 1954.
HMCS Stone Town	K531	Canadian Vickers, Montreal	17 November 1943	28 March 1944	21 July 1944	13 November 1945	Transferred to Department of Transport, serving as a weather monitoring ship in the North Pacific, 1952–1967. Sold, 1968.
HMCS Stormont	K327	Canadian Vickers, Montreal	23 December 1942	14 July 1943	27 November 1943	9 November 1945	Sold to Aristotle Onassis as yacht Christina.
HMCS Strathadam	K682	Yarrows Ltd., Esquimalt	6 December 1943	20 March 1944	29 September 1944	7 November 1945	Transferred to Israel as INS Misgav, 1950.
HMCS Sussexvale		Davie Shipbuilding & Repairing Co. Ltd., Lauzon					Cancelled, December 1943.
HMCS Sussexvale	K683	Davie Shipbuilding & Repairing Co. Ltd., Lauzon	15 November 1943	12 July 1944	29 November 1944	16 November 1945	Placed in reserve. Recommissioned as a Prestonian-class frigate with pennant FFE 313, 8 August 1955.
HMCS Swansea	K328	Yarrows Ltd., Esquimalt	15 July 1942	19 December 1942	4 October 1943	2 November 1945	Placed in reserve. Recommissioned as a Prestonian-class frigate with pennant FFE 306, 14 November 1957.
HMCS Teme	K458	Smiths Dock Co., South Bank-on-Tees	25 May 1943	11 November 1943	28 February 1944	4 May 1945	Formerly HMS Teme. Torpedoed and badly damaged off Lands End at 50-07N, 05-45W by U-315, 29 March 1945. Declared a total loss.
HMCS Thetford Mines	K459	Morton Engineering & Dry Dock Co., Quebec City	7 July 1943	30 October 1943	24 May 1944	18 November 1945	
HMCS Tisdale		Canadian Vickers, Montreal					Cancelled, December 1943.
HMCS Toronto	K538	Davie Shipbuilding & Repairing Co. Ltd., Lauzon	10 May 1943	18 September 1943	6 May 1944	27 November 1945	Placed in reserve. Recommissioned as a Prestonian-class frigate with pennant FFE 319, 26 November 1953.
HMCS Valleyfield	K329	Morton Engineering & Dry Dock Co., Quebec City	30 November 1942	17 July 1943	7 December 1943	7 May 1944	Torpedoed and sunk south of Cape Race at 46-03N, 52-24W by U-548, 7 May 1944. 125 crew were killed and 38 survivors were rescued by HMCS Giffard.
HMCS Victoriaville	K684	G T Davie, Lauzon	2 December 1943	23 June 1944	11 November 1944	17 November 1945	Placed in reserve. Recommissioned as a Prestonian-class frigate with pennant FFE 320, 25 September 1959.
HMCS Waskesiu	K330	Yarrows Ltd., Esquimalt	2 May 1942	3 April 1943	16 June 1943	29 January 1946	Transferred to India as HMIS Hooghly, 1950.
HMCS Wentworth	K331	Yarrows Ltd., Esquimalt	11 November 1942	6 March 1943	7 December 1943	10 October 1945	
HMCS Westbury		Davie Shipbuilding & Repairing Co. Ltd., Lauzon					Cancelled, December 1943.
HMCS Westville		Davie Shipbuilding & Repairing Co. Ltd., Lauzon					Cancelled, December 1943.
HMCS Wulastock		Yarrows Ltd., Esquimalt					Cancelled, December 1943.

== Free French Navy ==
Free French Navy
Ship	Pennant number	Builder	Laid down	Launched	Commissioned	Paid off	Fate
Croix de Lorraine	K258	Smiths Dock Co., South Bank-on-Tees		8 March 1943	25 September 1944	September 1961	Formerly HMS Strule. Transferred to the Free French Navy, 1 October 1944.
L'Aventure	K263	W. Simons & Co., Renfrew		30 November 1943	21 January 1944	1964	Formerly HMS Braid. Transferred to the Free French Navy, 21 January 1944.
L'Escarmouche	K267	Blyth Shipbuilding & Drydock, Blyth	30 May 1942	1 June 1943	3 March 1944	1960	Formerly HMS Frome. Transferred to the Free French Navy, 3 March 1944. Decommissioned, 1957; renamed L'Ailette.
La Découverte	K370	Henry Robb Ltd., Leith		18 June 1943	February 1944	1959	Formerly HMS Windrush. Transferred to the Free French Navy, February 1944. Renamed Lucifer in 1967 and used as training ship of the French Navy Security School at Querqueville. Scrapped there, June–October 2009.
La Surprise	K292	Blyth Shipbuilding & Drydock, Blyth	17 October 1942	16 August 1943	1944	1964	Formerly HMS Torridge. Transferred to the Free French Navy, 1944. Transferred to Royal Moroccan Navy as royal yacht Al Maouna, 1964.
Tonkinois	K260	Smiths Dock Co., South Bank-on-Tees		27 August 1942	15 October 1944	1961	Formerly HMS Moyola. Transferred to the Free French Navy, 15 October 1944. Decommissioned, 1953; renamed La Confiance.

== Royal Netherlands Navy ==
Royal Netherlands Navy
Ship	Pennant number	Builder	Laid down	Launched	Commissioned	Paid off	Fate
HNLMS Johan Maurits van Nassau	K251	W. Simons & Co., Renfrew	29 December 1942	23 April 1943	25 June 1943	1960	Formerly HMS Ribble (K251). Transferred while under construction to the Netherlands.

== South African Navy ==
South African Navy
Ship	Pennant number	Builder	Laid down	Launched	Commissioned	Paid off	Fate
HMSAS Swale	K217	Smiths Dock Co., South Bank-on-Tees	19 August 1941	16 January 1942	26 July 1945	January 1946	Formerly HMS Swale. Returned to RN, January 1946.
HMSAS Teviot	K222	Hall, Russell & Company, Aberdeen	4 October 1941	12 October 1942	10 June 1945		Formerly HMS Teviot. Returned to RN, January 1946.

== United States Navy ==
United States Navy
Ship	Hull number	Builder	Laid down	Launched	Commissioned	Paid off	Fate
USS Asheville	PF-1	Canadian Vickers, Montreal	10 March 1942	22 August 1942	1 December 1942	14 January 1946	Formerly HMS Adur, then PG-101. Transferred on 13 June 1946 to Argentina as ARA Hércules (P-31).
USS Natchez	PF-2	Canadian Vickers, Montreal	16 March 1942	12 September 1942	16 December 1942	14 January 1946	Formerly HMS Annan. Transferred to RCN during construction as HMCS Annan. Transferred to USN as PG-102 from RCN during construction on 20 July 1942. Sold 29 July 1947, resold 19 March 1948 to the Dominican Republic as Juan Pablo Duarte (F102).
