= K264 =

K264 or K-264 may refer to:

- K-264 (Kansas highway), a state highway in Kansas
- HMS Cam (K264), a former UK Royal Navy ship
