= F101 =

F101 or F-101 may refer to:

- F-101 Voodoo, a 1954 American supersonic military fighter
- General Electric F101, an afterburning turbofan jet engine
- Dominican frigate Presidente Trujillo (F101), a River-class frigate purchased by the Dominican Republic in 1946
- HMS Yarmouth (F101), a 1959 British Royal Navy Rothesay-class frigate
- Spanish frigate Álvaro de Bazán (F101), a 2005 Spanish Navy Álvaro de Bazán-class air defence frigate
- Maki F101, a 1974 Maki Formula One car
