= HMS Tweed (K250) =

River-class frigate of the Royal Navy

History

United Kingdom
- Name: Tweed
- Namesake: River Tweed
- Builder: A. & J. Inglis Ltd., Glasgow
- Laid down: 31 December 1941
- Launched: 24 November 1942
- Commissioned: 28 April 1943
- Fate: Sunk, 7 January 1944

General characteristics
- Class & type: River-class frigate
- Displacement: 1,370 long tons (1,390 t); 1,830 long tons (1,860 t) (deep load)
- Length: 283 ft (86.26 m) p/p; 301.25 ft (91.82 m)o/a
- Beam: 36.5 ft (11.13 m)
- Draught: 9 ft (2.74 m); 13 ft (3.96 m) (deep load)
- Propulsion: Parsons single reduction steam turbines, 6,500 ihp (4,800 kW)
- Speed: 20 knots (37.0 km/h)
- Range: 440 long tons (450 t; 490 short tons) oil fuel; 7,200 nautical miles (13,334 km) at 12 knots (22.2 km/h)
- Complement: 107
- Armament: 2 × QF 4-inch (102 mm) Mk.XIX guns, single mounts CP Mk.XXIII; up to 10 × QF 20 mm Oerlikon AA guns on twin mounts Mk.V and single mounts Mk.III; 1 × Hedgehog 24 spigot A/S projector; up to 150 depth charges

HMS Tweed (K250) was a River-class frigate of the Royal Navy (RN). Tweed was built to the RN's specifications as a Group I River-class frigate, though Tweed was one of the few powered by a turbine engine. She served in the North Atlantic during World War II.

== Background ==
As a River-class frigate, Tweed was one of 151 frigates launched between 1941 and 1944 for use as anti-submarine convoy escorts, named after rivers in the United Kingdom. The ships were designed by naval engineer William Reed, of Smith's Dock Company of South Bank-on-Tees, to have the endurance and anti-submarine capabilities of the Black Swan-class sloops, while being quick and cheap to build in civil dockyards using the machinery (e.g. reciprocating steam engines instead of turbines) and construction techniques pioneered in the building of the Flower-class corvettes. Its purpose was to improve on the convoy escort classes in service with the Royal Navy at the time, including the Flower class.

Tweed was funded through the Warship Week programme, with Hatfield, Hertfordshire raising over £150,000 to pay for the construction of the ship. The ship was adopted by the town in May 1943, with a plaque bearing the district's coat of arms being installed on the ship soon after.

== War Service ==
After commissioning in April 1943, Tweed participated in anti-submarine warfare exercises off Lough Foyle and served in convoy escort missions.

In late September 1943, Tweed rammed and possibly sank a U-boat.

Tweed was part of the escort group that sank German submarine U-536 on 20 November 1943.

On 7 January 1944, Tweed was about 600 miles west of Cape Ortegal in the Atlantic Ocean, serving as part of the 5th Escort Group. At 17:11 a GNAT torpedo fired by U-305 struck Tweed, which sank at 48°18′N 21°19′W with the loss of 83 lives. HMS Nene picked up 44 survivors.
