= HMS Avon (K97) =

River-class frigate of the Royal Navy

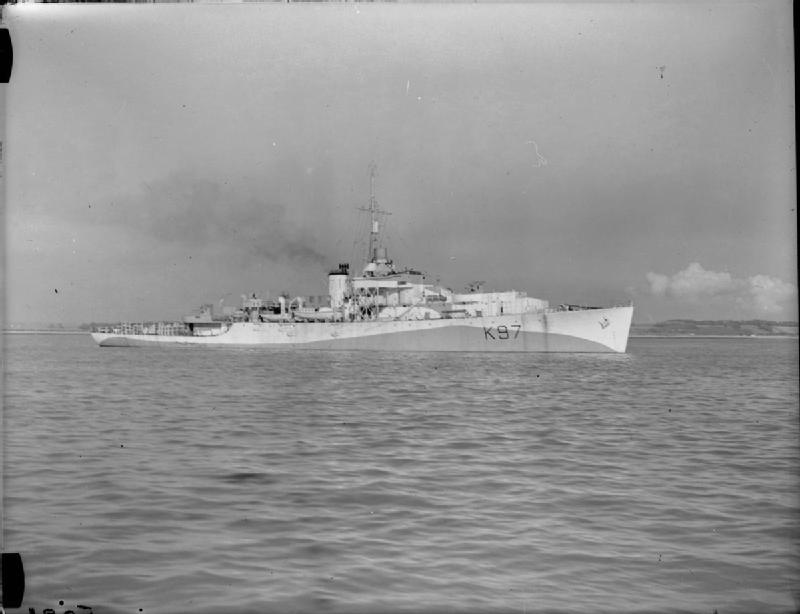
- HMS Avon during WWII

History

United Kingdom
- Name: Avon
- Ordered: 10 August 1942
- Builder: Charles Hill & Sons Ltd., Bristol on the river Avon.
- Laid down: 8 January 1943
- Launched: 19 June 1943
- Commissioned: 18 September 1943

Portugal
- Name: Nuno Tristão
- Acquired: 1949
- Fate: Broken up at Lisbon, 1972

General characteristics
- Class & type: River-class frigate
- Displacement: 1,370 long tons (1,390 t); 1,830 long tons (1,860 t) (deep load)
- Length: 283 ft (86.26 m) p/p; 301.25 ft (91.82 m)o/a
- Beam: 36.5 ft (11.13 m)
- Draught: 9 ft (2.74 m); 13 ft (3.96 m) (deep load)
- Propulsion: 2 × Admiralty 3-drum boilers, 2 shafts, reciprocating vertical triple expansion, 5,500 ihp (4,100 kW)
- Speed: 20 knots (37.0 km/h)
- Range: 440 long tons (450 t; 490 short tons) oil fuel; 7,200 nautical miles (13,334 km) at 12 knots (22.2 km/h)
- Complement: 107
- Armament: 2 × QF 4-inch (102 mm) Mk.XIX guns, single mounts CP Mk.XXIII; up to 10 × QF 20 mm Oerlikon AA guns on twin mounts Mk.V and single mounts Mk.III; 1 × Hedgehog 24 spigot A/S projector; up to 150 depth charges

HMS Avon, later renamed NRP Nuno Tristão, was a River-class frigate of the Royal Navy (RN). Avon was built to the RN's specifications as a Group II River-class frigate. She served in the North Atlantic during World War II.

As a River-class frigate, Avon was one of 151 frigates launched between 1941 and 1944 for use as anti-submarine convoy escorts, named after rivers in the United Kingdom. The ships were designed by naval engineer William Reed, of Smith's Dock Company of South Bank-on-Tees, to have the endurance and anti-submarine capabilities of the Black Swan-class sloops, while being quick and cheap to build in civil dockyards using the machinery (e.g. reciprocating steam engines instead of turbines) and construction techniques pioneered in the building of the Flower-class corvettes. Their purpose was to improve on the convoy escort classes in service with the Royal Navy at the time, including the Flower class.

In 1944 Avon was deployed in the Indian Ocean, where she rescued the survivors of the torpedoed Norwegian freighter Tarifa which was carrying Australian troops from North Africa back to Australia. (Note: Naval History claims that 96 survivors were rescued, whilst Uboat.net states that 123 survivors were rescued.) In 1945, as part of Task Force 57, she took part in the Battle of Okinawa. Postwar, Avon was paid off and placed in the Reserve Fleet, where she stayed until 1949. That year, she was sold to Portugal and renamed NRP Nuno Tristão.

The Nuno Tristão was used in several notable events, such as carrying Emperor Haile Selassie of Ethiopia on a state visit from Bayonne to Portugal in July 1959 and supporting fuzileiros in Africa. In 1970, after 21 years of service in the Portuguese Navy, the ship was delisted and she was scrapped in Lisbon two years later.
