= HMS Aire =

River-class frigate of the Royal Navy

History

United Kingdom
- Name: Aire
- Namesake: River Aire
- Ordered: 30 September 1941
- Builder: Fleming and Ferguson, Paisley
- Laid down: 12 June 1942
- Launched: 22 April 1943
- Completed: 28 July 1943
- Commissioned: 28 July 1943

History
- Name: Tamar; Aire
- Fate: Grounded on Bombay Reef, 20 December 1946

General characteristics
- Class & type: River-class frigate
- Displacement: 1,370 long tons (1,390 t); 1,830 long tons (1,860 t) (deep load)
- Length: 283 ft (86.26 m) p/p; 301.25 ft (91.82 m)o/a
- Beam: 36.5 ft (11.13 m)
- Draught: 9 ft (2.74 m); 13 ft (3.96 m) (deep load)
- Propulsion: 2 × Admiralty 3-drum boilers, 2 shafts, reciprocating vertical triple expansion, 5,500 ihp (4,100 kW)
- Speed: 20 knots (37.0 km/h)
- Range: 440 long tons (450 t; 490 short tons) oil fuel; 7,200 nautical miles (13,334 km) at 12 knots (22.2 km/h)
- Complement: 107
- Armament: 2 × QF 4-inch (102 mm) Mk.XIX guns, single mounts CP Mk.XXIII; up to 10 × QF 20 mm Oerlikon AA guns on twin mounts Mk.V and single mounts Mk.III; 1 × Hedgehog 24 spigot A/S projector; up to 150 depth charges

HMS Aire, later renamed Tamar, was a River-class frigate of the Royal Navy (RN). Aire was built to the RN's specifications as a Group II River-class frigate. She served in the North Atlantic during World War II.

As a River-class frigate, Aire was one of 151 frigates launched between 1941 and 1944 for use as anti-submarine convoy escorts, named after rivers in the United Kingdom. The ships were designed by naval engineer William Reed, of Smith's Dock Company of South Bank-on-Tees, to have the endurance and anti-submarine capabilities of the Black Swan-class sloops, while being quick and cheap to build in civil dockyards using the machinery (e.g. reciprocating steam engines instead of turbines) and construction techniques pioneered in the building of the Flower-class corvettes. Its purpose was to improve on the convoy escort classes in service with the Royal Navy at the time, including the Flower class.

After commissioning in July 1943, Aire took part in convoy missions in the Atlantic Ocean. She served in this role for two years, until 1945, when she was involved in several anti-submarine (A/S) exercises off Tobermory, Scotland. In March 1946 she was renamed Tamar while acting as the base ship at Hong Kong. In November 1946, her name reverted to Aire and she was listed to be paid off in Singapore. On 20 December 1946, as Aire was sailing from Hong Kong to Singapore, she encountered a typhoon. The ship grounded upon Bombay Reef in the East China Sea and became a total loss. All 85 crew on board were rescued by the depot ship, HMS Bonaventure.
