= HMAS Macquarie =

1945 River-class frigate

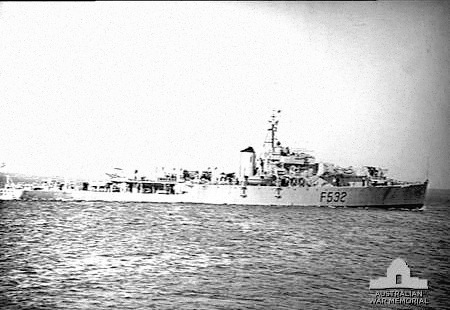
- Macquarie circa. 1952

History

Australia
- Name: Macquarie
- Namesake: Macquarie River
- Builder: Mort's Dock & Engineering Company, Sydney
- Launched: 3 March 1945
- Commissioned: 7 December 1945
- Decommissioned: 19 December 1946
- Recommissioned: 15 August 1952
- Decommissioned: 17 March 1954
- Fate: Sold for scrap

General characteristics
- Class & type: River-class frigate

HMAS Macquarie (K532/F532) was a River-class frigate constructed during World War II which served in the Royal Australian Navy (RAN).

== Construction ==
Macquarie was laid down by Mort's Dock & Engineering Company, Sydney, launched on 3 March 1945 and commissioned on 7 December 1945.

Macquarie was one of eight River-class frigates constructed in Australia for service in the RAN. She was named after the Macquarie River in New South Wales. Although constructed as part of the Australian wartime shipbuilding program, Macquarie did not enter service until after the end of World War II.

== Operational history ==
Following working up trials, Macquarie sailed from Sydney to New Guinea on 31 January 1946, to commence a three-month deployment. During this deployment she was involved in the salvage of Japanese tanker Naruto. She returned to Sydney in April, but sailed in June to Indonesia, where she was involved in war crimes trials and grave registration. On her return to Australia in October, she was decommissioned into reserve, on 19 December 1946.

Macquarie was recommissioned on 15 August 1952. Her first deployment was in support of the first British atomic test, Operation Hurricane.

Macquarie was paid off for a second time on 17 March 1954. She was sold for scrap on 5 July 1962.
