= HMS Ettrick (K254) =

1943 River-class frigate of the Royal Navy

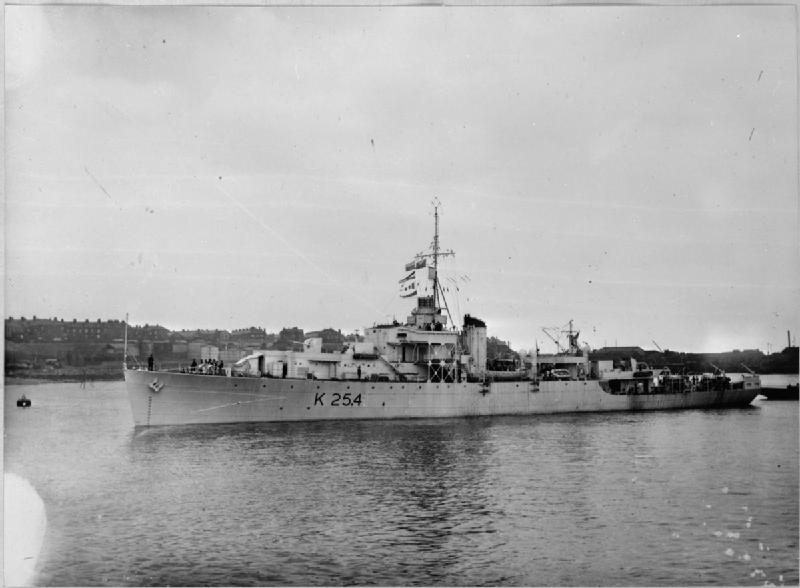
- HMS Ettrick

History

United Kingdom
- Name: Ettrick
- Namesake: Ettrick Water
- Ordered: 1 June 1941
- Builder: John Crown & Sons, Sunderland
- Laid down: 31 December 1941
- Launched: 25 February 1943
- Commissioned: 11 July 1943
- Decommissioned: 29 January 1944
- Identification: pennant number: K 254
- Honours and awards: Atlantic 1943
- Fate: Transferred to Canada 29 January 1944; Returned 30 May 1945; broken up June 1953

Canada
- Name: Ettrick
- Commissioned: 29 January 1944
- Decommissioned: 30 May 1945
- Identification: Pennant number: K 254
- Honours and awards: Atlantic 1944–45 Gulf of St. Lawrence 1944
- Fate: Returned to Royal Navy 1945

General characteristics
- Class & type: River-class frigate
- Displacement: 1,445 long tons (1,468 t; 1,618 short tons); 2,110 long tons (2,140 t; 2,360 short tons) (deep load)
- Length: 283 ft (86.26 m) p/p; 301.25 ft (91.82 m)o/a
- Beam: 36.5 ft (11.13 m)
- Draught: 9 ft (2.74 m); 13 ft (3.96 m) (deep load)
- Propulsion: 2 x Admiralty 3-drum boilers, 2 shafts, reciprocating vertical triple expansion, 5,500 ihp (4,100 kW)
- Speed: 20 knots (37.0 km/h); 20.5 knots (38.0 km/h) (turbine ships)
- Range: 646 long tons (656 t; 724 short tons) oil fuel; 7,500 nautical miles (13,890 km) at 15 knots (27.8 km/h)
- Complement: 157
- Armament: 2 × QF 4 in (102 mm)/45 Mk. XVI on twin mount HA/LA Mk.XIX; 1 × QF 12 pdr (3 in (76 mm)) 12 cwt /40 Mk. V on mounting HA/LA Mk.IX (not all ships); 8 × 20 mm QF Oerlikon A/A on twin mounts Mk.V; 1 × Hedgehog 24 spigot A/S projector; up to 150 depth charges

HMS Ettrick was a River-class frigate that fought for the Royal Navy and the Royal Canadian Navy during the Second World War. The vessel primarily saw action in the Battle of the Atlantic as a convoy escort. The ship was named for the Ettrick Water in Scotland.

Ettrick was ordered 1 June 1941 as part of the River-class building programme. The vessel was laid down on 31 December 1941 by John Crown & Sons at Sunderland and launched 25 February 1943. The ship was one of six frigates of the class to be fitted with steam turbines instead of the standard reciprocating machinery. She was commissioned into the Royal Navy on 11 July 1943.

== War service ==
=== Royal Navy ===
After commissioning and trials, Ettrick was assigned to the Mid-Ocean Escort Force (MOEF) as a convoy escort. From Dec 1943 to Mar 1944, she was commanded by Lt Cdr Nicholas Monsarrat, who later depicted her as "HMS River" in his 1946 novel H. M. Frigate. The ship was initially assigned to escort group C-1, a Canadian-commanded group. In January 1944 she put in at Halifax, Nova Scotia to undergo a refit. While there she was turned over to the Royal Canadian Navy.

=== Royal Canadian Navy ===
On 29 January 1944, while undergoing a refit at Halifax, Ettrick was commissioned into the Royal Canadian Navy. Once the refit was completed, the vessel was assigned to MOEF escort group C-3. She made two round trips to Derry with the group before transferring out to join escort group 27 based out of Halifax. On 14 January 1945, she rammed U-1232 during the defence of convoy BX 141, damaging the submarine's conning tower. The submarine however was able to escape. The ship remained as a local escort until the end of hostilities in Europe. She returned to the United Kingdom in May and was returned to the Royal Navy on 30 May 1945.

== Postwar service ==
Following the vessel's return to the Royal Navy, she was converted to a combined operations headquarters ship. The ship however was never recommissioned into the fleet and saw no service in her new capability. In April 1946 Ettrick was laid up at Harwich. The vessel was broken up in 1953 at Grays.

== Sources ==
- Macpherson, Ken; Barrie, Ron. (2002) Warships of Canada's Naval Forces 1910–2002. 3rd Edition. St. Catharines: Vanwell Publishing Limited. ISBN 1-55125-072-1
