= HMS Meon =

River-class frigate of the Royal Navy

History

United Kingdom
- Name: Meon
- Namesake: River Meon
- Ordered: 24 June 1942
- Builder: A. & J. Inglis, Glasgow
- Laid down: 31 December 1942
- Launched: 4 August 1943
- Sponsored by: Bletchley, Buckinghamshire
- Commissioned: 31 December 1943
- Decommissioned: 7 February 1944
- Identification: pennant number: K 269
- Fate: Transferred to Canada 7 February 1944; Returned 23 April 1945; broken up 14 May 1966

Canada
- Name: Meon
- Commissioned: 7 February 1944
- Decommissioned: 23 April 1945
- Identification: pennant number: K 269
- Honours and awards: Atlantic 1944–45, English Channel 1944, Normandy 1944 Gulf of St. Lawrence 1944
- Fate: returned to Royal Navy 1945

General characteristics
- Class & type: River-class frigate
- Displacement: 1,445 long tons (1,468 t; 1,618 short tons); 2,110 long tons (2,140 t; 2,360 short tons) (deep load)
- Length: 283 ft (86.26 m) p/p; 301.25 ft (91.82 m)o/a
- Beam: 36.5 ft (11.13 m)
- Draught: 9 ft (2.74 m); 13 ft (3.96 m) (deep load)
- Propulsion: 2 x Admiralty 3-drum boilers, 2 shafts, reciprocating vertical triple expansion, 5,500 ihp (4,100 kW)
- Speed: 20 knots (37.0 km/h); 20.5 knots (38.0 km/h) (turbine ships)
- Range: 646 long tons (656 t; 724 short tons) oil fuel; 7,500 nautical miles (13,890 km) at 15 knots (27.8 km/h)
- Complement: 157
- Armament: 2 × QF 4 in (102 mm) /45 Mk. XVI on twin mount HA/LA Mk.XIX; 1 × QF 12 pdr (3 in (76 mm)) 12 cwt /40 Mk. V on mounting HA/LA Mk.IX (not all ships); 8 × 20 mm QF Oerlikon A/A on twin mounts Mk.V; 1 × Hedgehog 24 spigot A/S projector; up to 150 depth charges

HMS Meon (K269) was a River-class frigate that served with the Royal Navy and Royal Canadian Navy in the Second World War. The vessel was used primarily as a convoy escort in the Battle of the Atlantic, but also took part in the Invasion of Normandy. After the war, the ship was converted to a headquarters vessel for amphibious operations, and saw service in the Persian Gulf from 1952 to 1965, before being scrapped in 1966. She was named for the River Meon in the United Kingdom and was sponsored by the town of Bletchley in Buckinghamshire.

Meon was ordered on 24 January 1942. The ship was laid down on 31 December 1942 by A. & J. Inglis at Glasgow and launched 4 August 1943. She was commissioned into the Royal Navy on 31 December 1943.

== War service ==
After commissioning and trials, Meon sailed with convoy ON 220 to Canada. Once there she was recommissioned into the Royal Canadian Navy at Halifax, Nova Scotia on 7 February 1944. After working up with her new Canadian crew, she joined convoy escort group 9 in May 1944. Following the ship's arrival in Londonderry Port to join the group, the vessel spent until October 1944 in the waters around the United Kingdom. It was during this period that Meon participated in Operation Neptune, the sea component of the invasion of Normandy and was present on D-day.

Arriving at Halifax on 19 October 1944, Meon joined local convoy escort group 27 and was named Senior Officer's ship. She remained with the group until the end of March 1945, when the vessel returned to the United Kingdom and was handed back over to the Royal Navy at Southampton on 23 April 1945.

== Postwar service ==
Following return from the Canadians, Meon was converted at Southampton into a combined operations headquarters ship for use in South-East Asia. The ship's 4-inch guns were removed, as were the Hedgehog anti-submarine mortars, with armament reducing to three Bofors guns, allowing extra communications equipment and accommodation to be added. The conversion was completed in December 1945, and Meon was laid up in reserve at Harwich. After being used as an accommodation ship at Harwich, Meon, still in reserve, moved to Sheerness in 1949.

Meon recommissioned in April 1951, and in July 1952 was transferred to the Persian Gulf to serve as HQ ship for the Amphibious Warfare Squadron (Gulf). In 1953, back in British waters for a refit, Meon took part in the Fleet Review to celebrate the Coronation of Queen Elizabeth II. In 1956 Meon took part in the Suez Crisis, commanding landing craft during Operation Musketeer. In late June 1961, in response to Iraqi threats to annex Kuwait, Meon took part in Operation Vantage, helping landings of British troops and equipment in Kuwait. The vessel remained in the Gulf until 1965. The ship was laid up at Portsmouth until being sold to Hughes Bolckow Ltd and being broken up at Blyth, Northumberland from 14 May 1966.

== Publications ==
- Colledge, J. J.; Warlow, Ben (2006) [1969]. Ships of the Royal Navy: The Complete Record of All Fighting Ships of the Royal Navy from the 15th Century to the Present (3rd Rev ed.). London: Chatham Publishing. ISBN 978-1-86176-281-8. OCLC 67375475.
- Critchley, Mike (1992). British Warships Since 1945: Part 5: Frigates. Liskeard, UK: Maritime Press. ISBN 0-907771-13-0.
- Friedman, Norman (2008). British Destroyers & Frigates: The Second World War and After. Barnsley, UK: Seaforth Publishing. ISBN 978-1-84832-015-4.
- Macpherson, Ken; Barrie, Ron (2002). The Ships of Canada's Naval Forces, 1910–2002 (3rd ed.). St. Catharines: Vanwell Publishing Limited. ISBN 1-55125-072-1.
- Zuehlke, Mark (2004). Juno Beach: Canada's D-Day Victory June 6, 1944 (1st ed.). Douglas & McIntyre. ISBN 1-55365-050-6.
