= HMCS Joliette =

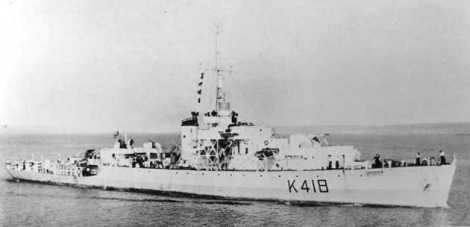
- HMCS Joliette

History

Canada
- Name: Joliette
- Namesake: Joliette, Quebec
- Operator: Royal Canadian Navy
- Ordered: October 1941
- Builder: Morton Engineering & Dry Dock Co., Quebec City
- Laid down: 19 July 1943
- Launched: 12 November 1943
- Commissioned: 14 June 1944
- Decommissioned: 19 November 1945
- Identification: Pennant number:K 418
- Honours and awards: Atlantic 1944
- Fate: Transferred to Chile 1946

Chile
- Name: Iquique
- Namesake: Iquique, Chile
- Operator: Chilean Navy
- Acquired: 21 May 1946
- Out of service: 1966
- Fate: Sold for breaking up 1968

General characteristics
- Class & type: River-class frigate
- Displacement: 1,445 long tons (1,468 t; 1,618 short tons); 2,110 long tons (2,140 t; 2,360 short tons) (deep load)
- Length: 283 ft (86.26 m) p/p; 301.25 ft (91.82 m)o/a
- Beam: 36.5 ft (11.13 m)
- Draught: 9 ft (2.74 m); 13 ft (3.96 m) (deep load)
- Propulsion: 2 x Admiralty 3-drum boilers, 2 shafts, reciprocating vertical triple expansion, 5,500 ihp (4,100 kW)
- Speed: 20 knots (37.0 km/h); 20.5 knots (38.0 km/h) (turbine ships)
- Range: 646 long tons (656 t; 724 short tons) oil fuel; 7,500 nautical miles (13,890 km) at 15 knots (27.8 km/h)
- Complement: 157
- Armament: 2 × QF 4 in (102 mm) /45 Mk. XVI on twin mount HA/LA Mk.XIX; 1 × QF 12 pdr (3 in (76 mm)) 12 cwt /40 Mk. V on mounting HA/LA Mk.IX (not all ships); 8 × 20 mm QF Oerlikon A/A on twin mounts Mk.V; 1 × Hedgehog 24 spigot A/S projector; up to 150 depth charges

HMCS Joliette was a River-class frigate that served with the Royal Canadian Navy during the Second World War. She served primarily as a convoy escort in the Battle of the Atlantic. She was named for Joliette, Quebec. After the war she was transferred to the Chilean Navy in 1946 and renamed Iquique. She served with the Chilean Navy until 1968.

Joliette was ordered in October 1941 as part of the River-class building program. She was laid down on 19 July 1943 by Morton Engineering & Dry Dock Co. at Quebec City and launched 12 November 1943. She was commissioned into the RCN on 14 June 1944 at Quebec City.

== Background ==
The River-class frigate was designed by William Reed of Smith's Dock Company of South Bank-on-Tees. Originally called a "twin-screw corvette", its purpose was to improve on the convoy escort classes in service with the Royal Navy at the time, including the Flower-class corvette. The first orders were placed by the Royal Navy in 1940 and the vessels were named for rivers in the United Kingdom, giving name to the class. In Canada they were named for towns and cities though they kept the same designation. The name "frigate" was suggested by Vice-Admiral Percy Nelles of the Royal Canadian Navy and was adopted later that year.

Improvements over the corvette design included improved accommodation which was markedly better. The twin engines gave only three more knots of speed but extended the range of the ship to nearly double that of a corvette at 7,200 nautical miles (13,300 km) at 12 knots. Among other lessons applied to the design was an armament package better designed to combat U-boats including a twin 4-inch mount forward and 12-pounder aft. 15 Canadian frigates were initially fitted with a single 4-inch gun forward but with the exception of HMCS Valleyfield, they were all eventually upgraded to the double mount. For underwater targets, the River-class frigate was equipped with a Hedgehog anti-submarine mortar and depth charge rails aft and four side-mounted throwers.

River-class frigates were the first Royal Canadian Navy warships to carry the 147B Sword horizontal fan echo sonar transmitter in addition to the irregular ASDIC. This allowed the ship to maintain contact with targets even while firing unless a target was struck. Improved radar and direction-finding equipment improved the RCN's ability to find and track enemy submarines over the previous classes.

Canada originally ordered the construction of 33 frigates in October 1941. The design was too big for the shipyards on the Great Lakes so all the frigates built in Canada were built in dockyards along the west coast or along the St. Lawrence River. In all Canada ordered the construction of 60 frigates including ten for the Royal Navy that transferred two to the United States Navy.

== War service ==
After working up at Bermuda, Joliette joined the Mid-Ocean Escort Force (MOEF) escort group C-1 at St. John's as a trans-Atlantic convoy escort. In September 1944 she transferred to escort group EG 25 based out of Derry. Upon returning to Derry following her first round trip to Halifax, Joliette ran aground in Lough Foyle. The damage was significant and required five months repair at Belfast beginning 5 December 1944 and taking until 5 April 1945. After the extensive layoff, Joliette was sent to work up at Tobermory. She returned to Canada in June 1945 and was paid off 19 November 1945 at Sydney and placed in reserve at Shelburne.

== Postwar service ==
Joliette was transferred to the Chilean Navy in 1946. She was renamed Iquique, for Iquique, Chile. She was the second ship to bear the name. Iquique carried the Chilean expedition to establish Captain Arturo Prat Base on Greenwich Island, the first Chilean base in Antarctica. She served with the Chilean Navy until 1966, when she was sold and scrapped in 1968.
