= HMCS Wentworth =

River-class frigate of the Royal Canadian Navy during WW2

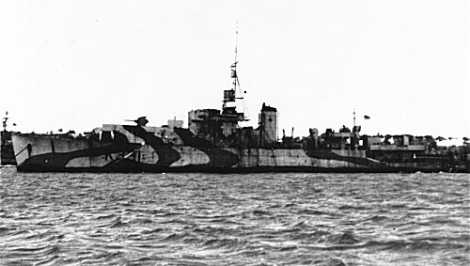
- HMCS Wentworth

History

Canada
- Name: Wentworth
- Namesake: Dartmouth, Nova Scotia, Sir John Wentworth
- Operator: Royal Canadian Navy
- Ordered: April 1942
- Builder: Yarrows Ltd., Esquimalt
- Laid down: 11 November 1942
- Launched: 6 March 1943
- Commissioned: 7 December 1943
- Decommissioned: 10 October 1945
- Identification: pennant number: K 331
- Honours and awards: Atlantic 1944-45
- Fate: Scrapped 1947 at Sydney

General characteristics
- Class & type: River-class frigate
- Displacement: 1,445 long tons (1,468 t; 1,618 short tons); 2,110 long tons (2,140 t; 2,360 short tons) (deep load)
- Length: 283 ft (86.26 m) p/p; 301.25 ft (91.82 m)o/a
- Beam: 36.5 ft (11.13 m)
- Draught: 9 ft (2.74 m); 13 ft (3.96 m) (deep load)
- Propulsion: 2 x Admiralty 3-drum boilers, 2 shafts, reciprocating vertical triple expansion, 5,500 ihp (4,100 kW)
- Speed: 20 knots (37.0 km/h); 20.5 knots (38.0 km/h) (turbine ships)
- Range: 646 long tons (656 t; 724 short tons) oil fuel; 7,500 nautical miles (13,890 km) at 15 knots (27.8 km/h)
- Complement: 157
- Armament: 2 × QF 4 in (102 mm) /45 Mk. XVI on twin mount HA/LA Mk.XIX; 1 × QF 12 pdr (3 in (76 mm)) 12 cwt /40 Mk. V on mounting HA/LA Mk.IX (not all ships); 8 × 20 mm QF Oerlikon A/A on twin mounts Mk.V; 1 × Hedgehog 24 spigot A/S projector; up to 150 depth charges

HMCS Wentworth was a River-class frigate that served with the Royal Canadian Navy during the Second World War. She served primarily as a convoy escort in the Battle of the Atlantic. She was named in honour of the town of Dartmouth, Nova Scotia. She could not be named HMCS Dartmouth for fear of confusion with HMS Dartmouth, and so was named after a famous early resident, Nova Scotia Lieutenant Governor Sir John Wentworth. Her name is often mistakenly associated with Wentworth County, Ontario, in honour of the city of Hamilton.

Wentworth was ordered in April 1942 as part of the 1942–1943 River-class building program. She was laid down on 11 November 1942 by Yarrows Ltd at Esquimalt, British Columbia and launched 6 March 1943. She was commissioned into the Royal Canadian Navy on 7 December 1943 at Victoria, British Columbia.

== Background ==
The River-class frigate was designed by William Reed of Smith's Dock Company of South Bank-on-Tees. Originally called a "twin-screw corvette", its purpose was to improve on the convoy escort classes in service with the Royal Navy at the time, including the Flower-class corvette. The first orders were placed by the Royal Navy in 1940 and the vessels were named for rivers in the United Kingdom, giving name to the class. In Canada they were named for towns and cities though they kept the same designation. The name "frigate" was suggested by Vice-Admiral Percy Nelles of the Royal Canadian Navy and was adopted later that year.

Improvements over the corvette design included improved accommodation which was markedly better. The twin engines gave only three more knots of speed but extended the range of the ship to nearly double that of a corvette at 7,200 nautical miles (13,300 km) at 12 knots. Among other lessons applied to the design was an armament package better designed to combat U-boats including a twin 4-inch mount forward and 12-pounder aft. 15 Canadian frigates were initially fitted with a single 4-inch gun forward but with the exception of HMCS Valleyfield, they were all eventually upgraded to the double mount. For underwater targets, the River-class frigate was equipped with a Hedgehog anti-submarine mortar and depth charge rails aft and four side-mounted throwers.

River-class frigates were the first Royal Canadian Navy warships to carry the 147B Sword horizontal fan echo sonar transmitter in addition to the irregular ASDIC. This allowed the ship to maintain contact with targets even while firing unless a target was struck. Improved radar and direction-finding equipment improved the RCN's ability to find and track enemy submarines over the previous classes.

Canada originally ordered the construction of 33 frigates in October 1941. The design was too big for the locks on the Lachine Canal so it was not built by the shipyards on the Great Lakes and therefore all the frigates built in Canada were built in dockyards along the West Coast or along the St. Lawrence River below Montreal. In all Canada ordered the construction of 60 frigates including ten for the Royal Navy that transferred two to the United States Navy.

== War service ==
After transiting from Victoria to Halifax Wentworth departed for Bermuda to work up. However while training, she developed defects and was forced to return to Halifax to undergo repair. Following that, she completed working up in St. Margaret's Bay.

In June 1944 Wentworth was assigned to the Mid-Ocean Escort Force escort group C-4. She began service as a trans-Atlantic convoy escort that month, and was made Senior Officer's Ship of the group in August 1944. The vessel remained in this function until February 1945, when she returned to Canada to undergo a significant refit at Shelburne, Nova Scotia. This refit lasted from 7 March until 9 August. By then the war in Europe had come to an end. Her services no longer needed, she was paid off 10 October 1945 and laid up in Bedford Basin. She was sold for scrap on 17 November 1947 and taken to Sydney, Nova Scotia to be broken up by Dominion Steel Corp. in 1948.
