= USS Asheville (PF-1) =

1942 River-class frigate

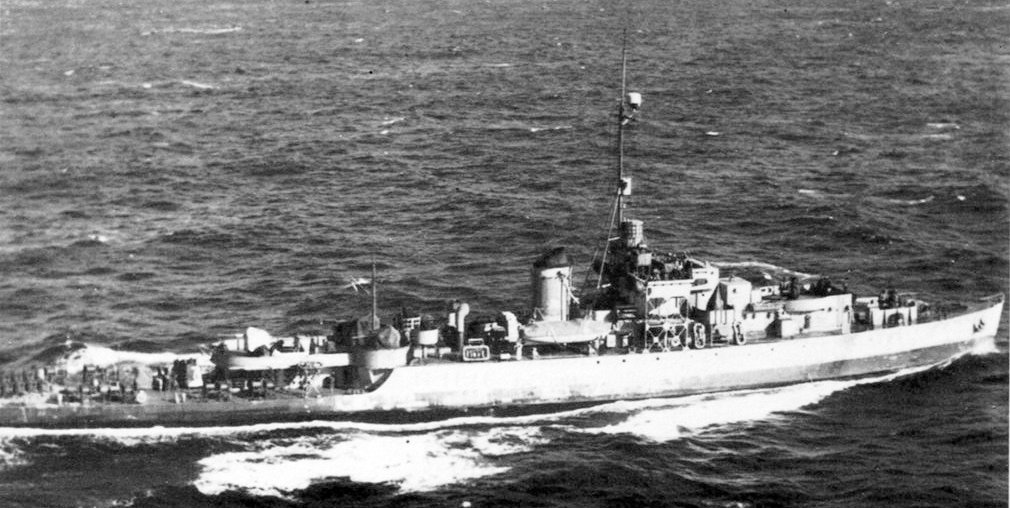
- USS Asheville (PF-1)

History

United States
- Name: Asheville
- Namesake: City of Asheville, North Carolina
- Builder: Canadian Vickers Ltd., Montreal
- Laid down: 10 March 1942
- Launched: 22 August 1942
- Commissioned: 1 December 1942
- Decommissioned: 14 January 1946
- Stricken: 25 February 1946
- Home port: New York City
- Identification: PG-101; PF-1, 15 April 1943
- Fate: Sold to Argentina

Argentina
- Name: Hercules
- Acquired: c. 1946
- Renamed: Juan B. Azopardo
- Stricken: 1973
- Identification: P31; GC11
- Fate: Stricken 1973

General characteristics
- Class & type: River-class frigate
- Displacement: 2,360 long tons (2,400 t)
- Length: 301 ft 6 in (91.90 m)
- Beam: 36 ft 6 in (11.13 m)
- Draft: 13 ft 8 in (4.17 m)
- Installed power: 11,000 ihp (8,200 kW)
- Propulsion: 2 × Canadian Vickers vertical triple expansion steam engines; 2 × 225 psi 3-drum express boilers; 2 × shafts
- Speed: 20.3 kn (37.6 km/h; 23.4 mph)
- Complement: 194
- Armament: 3 × 3"/50 dual purpose gun mounts; 4 × 40 mm gun mounts; 9 × 20 mm gun mounts; 2 × Depth charge racks; 8 × Depth charge projectors; 1 × Hedgehog depth charge projector

USS Asheville (PF-1) was an Asheville-class patrol frigate of the United States Navy that served during World War II. She was laid down on 10 March 1942 by Canadian Vickers Ltd. in Montreal, Quebec, Canada as the River-class frigate HMS Adur (K296) to serve in the British Royal Navy. She was launched on 22 August 1942 but due to a lack of American vessels for convoy protection she was transferred to the United States Navy prior to completion. On 1 December 1942, she was commissioned in Montreal as USS Asheville (PG-101), a patrol gunboat. She was reclassified PF-1 on 15 April 1943.

Initially Asheville served on convoy escort but then transferred to anti-submarine patrols.

She was decommissioned in January 1946 at the Norfolk Navy Yard and struck from the Navy Register in February. She was sold in June 1946 and later resold to Argentina where she was renamed Hercules and later Juan B. Azopardo (GC 11). She was stricken in 1973, but her fate beyond that is not reported in secondary sources.

== Service history ==
=== World War II ===
==== Convoys and patrols ====
After her launch and commissioning, Asheville sailed to Boston, Massachusetts via the Saint Lawrence River and Atlantic Ocean where she was completed. On 23 February 1943, Asheville reported to the Commander, Eastern Sea Frontier, for duty. She was assigned to escort convoys between New York City and Guantanamo Bay, Cuba. She continued this until 2 September, when she was reassigned to anti-submarine patrols. On 17 September, she escorted a burned-out ammunition ship out to sea and scuttled her in the deep waters. Asheville continued antisubmarine patrols until May 1944.

==== Experimental testing ====
In May 1944, Asheville reported to the Boston Navy Yard where experimental anti-submarine warfare (ASW) gear was installed. Once the equipment was installed she began testing it under guidance of the Commander, Antisubmarine Development Detachment, U.S. Atlantic Fleet (COMASDEVLANT). In early September, her experimental testing was interrupted when she joined a hunter-killer group in a search for a suspected German U-boat. The search turned up nothing and she reported back to her experimental testing. On 15 September, she relocated to Port Everglades, Florida, COMASDEVLANT's new surface ship base. She operated out of that port until April 1945, testing several ASW devices.

On 13 April 1945, Asheville reported to New York with a new assignment with the Commander, Eastern Sea Frontier, where she returned to antisubmarine patrols. Less than a month later, on 8 May, hostilities ended in Europe and the Atlantic Ocean. With the threat of U-boats gone, Asheville returned to Port Everglades where she underwent more experimental testing. On 19 July 1945, she received orders to return to New York where an experimental radar system was installed. She spent the remainder of 1945 testing the RADAR system along the eastern coast.

=== Argentine service ===
On 14 January 1946, Asheville was decommissioned at the Norfolk Navy Yard in Portsmouth, Virginia. Her name was struck from the Navy Register on 25 February 1946, and she was sold to the United Boat Service Corporation on 15 June 1946. She was later sold to Argentina and was renamed ARA Hercules (P-31) and later PNA Juan B. Azopardo (GC-11). Her exact fate is unknown.
