= HMCS Capilano =

1944 River-class frigate

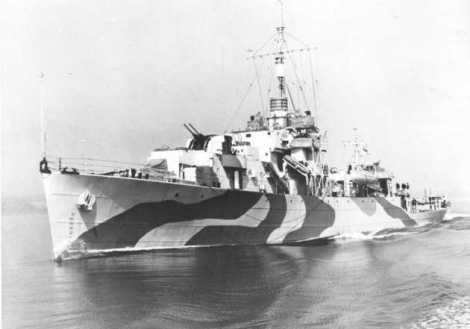
- HMCS Capilano

History

Canada
- Name: Capilano
- Namesake: Capilano Lake, North Vancouver, British Columbia
- Ordered: 1 February 1943
- Builder: Yarrows, Esquimalt
- Yard number: 95
- Laid down: 18 November 1943
- Launched: 8 April 1944
- Commissioned: 25 August 1944
- Decommissioned: 24 November 1945
- Identification: Pennant number:K409
- Honours and awards: Atlantic, 1944-45.
- Fate: Sold 1947, foundered 1953 off coast of Cuba.

General characteristics
- Class & type: River-class frigate
- Displacement: 1,445 long tons (1,468 t; 1,618 short tons); 2,110 long tons (2,140 t; 2,360 short tons) (deep load)
- Length: 283 ft (86.26 m) p/p; 301.25 ft (91.82 m)o/a
- Beam: 36.5 ft (11.13 m)
- Draught: 9 ft (2.74 m); 13 ft (3.96 m) (deep load)
- Propulsion: 2 x Admiralty 3-drum boilers, 2 shafts, reciprocating vertical triple expansion, 5,500 ihp (4,100 kW)
- Speed: 20 knots (37.0 km/h); 20.5 knots (38.0 km/h) (turbine ships)
- Range: 646 long tons (656 t; 724 short tons) oil fuel; 7,500 nautical miles (13,890 km) at 15 knots (27.8 km/h)
- Complement: 157
- Armament: 2 × QF 4 in (102 mm)/45 Mk. XVI on twin mount HA/LA Mk.XIX; 8 × 20 mm QF Oerlikon A/A on twin mounts Mk.V; 1 × Hedgehog 24 spigot A/S projector; up to 150 depth charges

HMCS Capilano was a River-class frigate that served with the Royal Canadian Navy during the Second World War. She served primarily as a convoy escort in the Battle of the Atlantic. She is named for the Capilino River in North Vancouver, British Columbia. The navy intended to name the ship after North Vancouver; however, due to possible confusion with HMCS Vancouver, she was named after the lake.

Capilano was ordered on 1 February 1943 as part of the 1943–44 River-class building program. She was laid down on 18 November 1943 by Yarrows Ltd. at Esquimalt and launched on 8 April 1944. Capilano was commissioned into the RCN on 25 August 1944 at Victoria, British Columbia.

== Background ==
The River-class frigate was designed by William Reed of Smith's Dock Company of South Bank-on-Tees. Originally called a "twin-screw corvette," its purpose was to improve on the convoy escort classes in service with the Royal Navy at the time, including the Flower-class corvette. The first orders were placed by the Royal Navy in 1940, and the vessels were named for rivers in the United Kingdom, giving name to the class. In Canada, they were named for towns and cities, though they kept the same designation. The name "frigate" was suggested by Vice-Admiral Percy Nelles of the Royal Canadian Navy and was adopted later that year.

Improvements over the Corvette design included improved accommodation, which was markedly better. The twin engines gave only three more knots of speed but extended the range of the ship to nearly double that of a corvette at 7,200 nautical miles (13,300 km) at 12 knots. Among other lessons applied to the design was an armament package better designed to combat U-boats, including a twin 4-inch mount forward and a 12-pounder aft. 15 Canadian frigates were initially fitted with a single 4-inch gun forward, but with the exception of HMCS Valleyfield, they were all eventually upgraded to the double mount. For underwater targets, the River-class frigate was equipped with a Hedgehog anti-submarine mortar and depth charge rails aft and four side-mounted throwers.

River-class frigates were the first Royal Canadian Navy warships to carry the 147B Sword horizontal fan echo sonar transmitter in addition to the irregular ASDIC. This allowed the ship to maintain contact with targets even while firing, unless a target was struck. Improved radar and direction-finding equipment improved the RCN's ability to find and track enemy submarines over the previous classes.

Canada originally ordered the construction of 33 frigates in October 1941. The design was too big for the shipyards on the Great Lakes, so all the frigates built in Canada were built in dockyards along the west coast or along the St. Lawrence River. In all, Canada ordered the construction of 60 frigates, including ten for the Royal Navy, which transferred two to the United States Navy.

== Service history ==
After commissioning, Capilano transited to Halifax and worked initially in St. Margaret's Bay before completing them in Bermuda. In November 1944, she was assigned to the Mid-Ocean Escort Force (MOEF) escort group C-2 as a trans-Atlantic convoy escort. She continued in this capacity until the end of the conflict in Europe, at which point she returned to Canada in June 1945 and, upon arrival, began her tropicalization refit for possible deployment to the Pacific Ocean. The refit was completed on 10 October, however, by this point, Japan had surrendered, and on 24 November 1945, she was paid off and placed in reserve at Bedford Basin.

Capilano was sold for mercantile use in 1947 and underwent conversion. In 1948, she reappeared as the Panamanian-registered Irving Francis M., owned by Irving Mindel. On 8 December 1953, while under tow from Jamaica to Miami, she foundered off the coast of Cabo Maysi, Cuba. In 2010, a framed photo of the ship and its badge was presented to the City of North Vancouver to mark the Canadian Naval Centennial.

== See also ==
- List of ships of the Canadian Navy
