= HMCS Poundmaker =

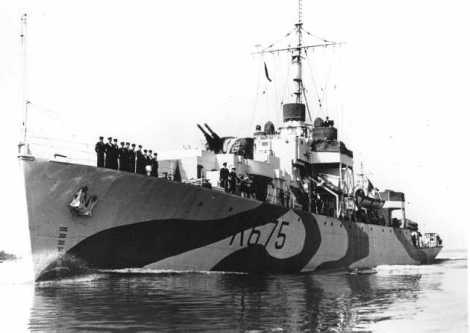
- HMCS Poundmaker

History

Canada
- Name: Poundmaker
- Namesake: Poundmaker Cree Nation, Saskatchewan
- Operator: Royal Canadian Navy
- Ordered: 1 February 1943
- Builder: Canadian Vickers, Montreal
- Laid down: 29 January 1944
- Launched: 21 April 1944
- Commissioned: 17 September 1944
- Decommissioned: 25 November 1945
- Identification: Pennant number:K 675
- Honours and awards: Atlantic 1944–45
- Fate: Transferred to Peru 1947

Peru
- Name: Teniente Ferré
- Operator: Peruvian Navy
- Acquired: 1947
- Out of service: 1966
- Renamed: Ferré (1953)
- Identification: FE-3 (1959); FE-66 (1960)
- Fate: Discarded 1966

General characteristics
- Class & type: River-class frigate
- Displacement: 1,445 long tons (1,468 t; 1,618 short tons); 2,110 long tons (2,140 t; 2,360 short tons) (deep load)
- Length: 283 ft (86.26 m) p/p; 301.25 ft (91.82 m)o/a
- Beam: 36.5 ft (11.13 m)
- Draught: 9 ft (2.74 m); 13 ft (3.96 m) (deep load)
- Propulsion: 2 x Admiralty 3-drum boilers, 2 shafts, reciprocating vertical triple expansion, 5,500 ihp (4,100 kW)
- Speed: 20 knots (37.0 km/h); 20.5 knots (38.0 km/h) (turbine ships)
- Range: 646 long tons (656 t; 724 short tons) oil fuel; 7,500 nautical miles (13,890 km) at 15 knots (27.8 km/h)
- Complement: 157
- Armament: 2 × QF 4 in (102 mm) /45 Mk. XVI on twin mount HA/LA Mk.XIX; 1 × QF 12 pdr (3 in (76 mm)) 12 cwt /40 Mk. V on mounting HA/LA Mk.IX (not all ships); 8 × 20 mm QF Oerlikon A/A on twin mounts Mk.V; 1 × Hedgehog 24 spigot A/S projector; up to 150 depth charges

HMCS Poundmaker was a River-class frigate that served with the Royal Canadian Navy during the Second World War. It saw action as a convoy escort during the Battle of the Atlantic. She was named for the Poundmaker Cree Nation of Saskatchewan. After the war she was sold to Peru and renamed Teniente Ferré in 1947.

Poundmaker was ordered on 1 February 1943 as part of the 1943–1944 River-class building program. She was laid down on 29 January 1944 by Canadian Vickers Ltd. at Montreal, Quebec and launched on 21 April later that year. She was commissioned into the Royal Canadian Navy on 17 September 1944 at Montreal.

== Background ==
The River-class frigate was designed by William Reed of Smith's Dock Company of South Bank-on-Tees. Originally called a "twin-screw corvette", its purpose was to improve on the convoy escort classes in service with the Royal Navy at the time, including the Flower-class corvette. The first orders were placed by the Royal Navy in 1940 and the vessels were named for rivers in the United Kingdom, giving name to the class. In Canada they were named for towns and cities though they kept the same designation. The name "frigate" was suggested by Vice-Admiral Percy Nelles of the Royal Canadian Navy and was adopted later that year.

Improvements over the corvette design included improved accommodation which was markedly better. The twin engines gave only three more knots of speed but extended the range of the ship to nearly double that of a corvette at 7,200 nautical miles (13,300 km) at 12 knots. Among other lessons applied to the design was an armament package better designed to combat U-boats including a twin 4-inch mount forward and 12-pounder aft. 15 Canadian frigates were initially fitted with a single 4-inch gun forward but with the exception of HMCS Valleyfield, they were all eventually upgraded to the double mount. For underwater targets, the River-class frigate was equipped with a Hedgehog anti-submarine mortar and depth charge rails aft and four side-mounted throwers.

River-class frigates were the first Royal Canadian Navy warships to carry the 147B Sword horizontal fan echo sonar transmitter in addition to the irregular ASDIC. This allowed the ship to maintain contact with targets even while firing unless a target was struck. Improved radar and direction-finding equipment improved the RCN's ability to find and track enemy submarines over the previous classes.

Canada originally ordered the construction of 33 frigates in October 1941. The design was too big for the shipyards on the Great Lakes so all the frigates built in Canada were built in dockyards along the west coast or along the St. Lawrence River. In all Canada ordered the construction of 60 frigates including ten for the Royal Navy that transferred two to the United States Navy.

== War service ==
After working up in Bermuda in November 1944, Poundmaker was assigned to the Mid-Ocean Escort Force escort group C-8 as a trans-Atlantic convoy escort. She served in this capacity until May 1945, when she returned to Canada to undergo a tropicalization refit in preparation for service in the southern Pacific Ocean. The work was completed at Lunenburg, Nova Scotia on 20 August 1945 and she was paid off on 25 November later that year at Sydney, Nova Scotia. She was taken to Shelburne and laid up for disposal.

== Postwar service ==
Poundmaker underwent a minor refit at Dartmouth in 1947 at the cost of $200,000 after being sold to the Peruvian Navy. From there she sailed to Peru where she was recommissioned as the Teniente Ferré. In 1954 she was sent to the United States to have her armament and fire control upgraded. She was renamed as Ferré in 1953 and was discarded in 1966.
