= HMCS Orkney =

River-class frigate of the Royal Canadian Navy

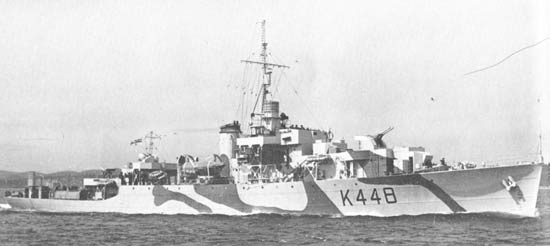
- HMCS Orkney

History

Canada
- Name: Orkney
- Namesake: Orkney, Saskatchewan
- Ordered: June 1942
- Builder: Yarrows, Esquimalt
- Laid down: 19 May 1943
- Launched: 18 September 1943
- Commissioned: 18 April 1944
- Decommissioned: 22 January 1946
- Identification: Pennant number:K448
- Honours and awards: Gulf of St. Lawrence 1944, North Sea 1945
- Fate: Sold, became Israeli immigrant ship Violetta 1947

Israel
- Name: Mivtakh
- Namesake: "Reliance"
- Acquired: 1952
- Commissioned: 1952
- Decommissioned: 1958
- Identification: Pennant number:K-28
- Fate: Sold 1959 to Ceylon

Ceylon
- Name: Mahasena
- Namesake: Mahasena of Anuradhapura
- Acquired: 1958
- Commissioned: 1959
- Decommissioned: 1964
- Fate: Sold 1964, broken up in Singapore

General characteristics
- Class & type: River-class frigate
- Displacement: 1,445 long tons (1,468 t; 1,618 short tons); 2,110 long tons (2,140 t; 2,360 short tons) (deep load)
- Length: 283 ft (86.26 m) p/p; 301.25 ft (91.82 m)o/a
- Beam: 36.5 ft (11.13 m)
- Draught: 9 ft (2.74 m); 13 ft (3.96 m) (deep load)
- Propulsion: 2 x Admiralty 3-drum boilers, 2 shafts, reciprocating vertical triple expansion, 5,500 ihp (4,100 kW)
- Speed: 20 knots (37.0 km/h); 20.5 knots (38.0 km/h) (turbine ships)
- Range: 646 long tons (656 t; 724 short tons) oil fuel; 7,500 nautical miles (13,890 km) at 15 knots (27.8 km/h)
- Complement: 157
- Armament: 2 × QF 4 in (102 mm) /45 Mk. XVI on twin mount HA/LA Mk.XIX; 1 × QF 12 pdr (3 in (76 mm)) 12 cwt /40 Mk. V on mounting HA/LA Mk.IX (not all ships); 8 × 20 mm QF Oerlikon A/A on twin mounts Mk.V; 1 × Hedgehog 24 spigot A/S projector; up to 150 depth charges

HMCS Orkney was a River-class frigate that served with the Royal Canadian Navy as a convoy escort during the Second World War. She was named for Orkney, Saskatchewan. After the war she was purchased and used by the Israeli immigrant movement, then taken over by the nascent Israeli Navy and renamed Mivtah. She was sold by Israel to Ceylon who renamed her Mahasena.

Orkney was ordered in June 1942 as part of the 1942–1943 River-class program. She was laid down on 19 May 1943 by Yarrows Ltd. at Esquimalt and launched 18 September 1943. She was commissioned into the Royal Canadian Navy on 18 April 1944 at Victoria, British Columbia.

== Background ==
The River-class frigate was designed by William Reed of Smith's Dock Company of South Bank-on-Tees. Originally called a "twin-screw corvette", its purpose was to improve on the convoy escort classes in service with the Royal Navy at the time, including the Flower-class corvette. The first orders were placed by the Royal Navy in 1940 and the vessels were named for rivers in the United Kingdom, giving name to the class. In Canada they were named for towns and cities though they kept the same designation. The name "frigate" was suggested by Vice-Admiral Percy Nelles of the Royal Canadian Navy and was adopted later that year.

Improvements over the corvette design included improved accommodation which was markedly better. The twin engines gave only three more knots of speed but extended the range of the ship to nearly double that of a corvette at 7,200 nautical miles (13,300 km) at 12 knots. Among other lessons applied to the design was an armament package better designed to combat U-boats including a twin 4-inch mount forward and 12-pounder aft. 15 Canadian frigates were initially fitted with a single 4-inch gun forward but with the exception of HMCS Valleyfield, they were all eventually upgraded to the double mount. For underwater targets, the River-class frigate was equipped with a Hedgehog anti-submarine mortar and depth charge rails aft and four side-mounted throwers.

River-class frigates were the first Royal Canadian Navy warships to carry the 147B Sword horizontal fan echo sonar transmitter in addition to the irregular ASDIC. This allowed the ship to maintain contact with targets even while firing unless a target was struck. Improved radar and direction-finding equipment improved the RCN's ability to find and track enemy submarines over the previous classes.

Canada originally ordered the construction of 33 frigates in October 1941. The design was too big for the shipyards on the Great Lakes so all the frigates built in Canada were built in dockyards along the west coast or along the St. Lawrence River. In all Canada ordered the construction of 60 frigates including ten for the Royal Navy that transferred two to the United States Navy.

== War service ==
After working up in Bermuda, Orkney returned to Halifax, Nova Scotia and was assigned to escort group EG 16. She was later transferred to escort group EG 25 as Senior Officer's Ship based out of Derry. She served with the unit until 13 February 1945 when she was involved in a collision with the merchant ship SS Blairnevis in the Irish Sea. Orkney suffered severe damage, requiring her grounding to keep her afloat, while Blairnevis sank as a result of the collision. She was taken to Dunstaffnage, Scotland where repairs were affected until mid-April. She was worked up at Tobermory before returning to Canada in late May 1945 to undergo a tropicalization refit at Louisburg, Nova Scotia in preparation for service in the southern Pacific Ocean. The refit was completed 20 October and Orkney performed local duties until being paid off 22 January 1946. She was placed in reserve in Bedford Basin.

== Postwar service ==
=== Israeli Navy ===
In 1947, Orkney was sold for commercial use as an Israeli immigration ship. She was renamed Violetta and was used as such until she was taken over by the Israeli Navy in 1949. She was renamed Mivtah (Hebrew: מִבְטָח, lit. safe haven) with the pennant number K-28. She served with the Israeli Navy until 1958 when she was sold to Ceylon.

=== Sri Lanka Navy ===
Ceylon purchased Mivtakh in 1958 but required that the Israeli Navy send personnel with her to teach the Sri Lanka Navy how to use her. She was commissioned in 1959 under her new name Mahasena. She served until 1964, performing goodwill tours around Southeast Asia, when she was sold and broken up at Singapore.
