= HMS Cam =

River-class frigate of the Royal Navy

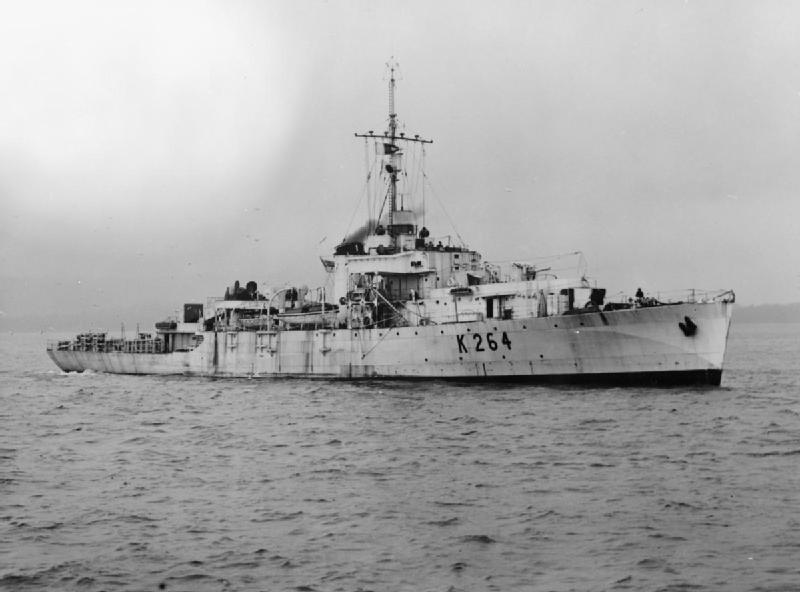
- HMS Cam in 1944

History

United Kingdom
- Name: Cam
- Namesake: River Cam
- Builder: George Brown & Co., Greenock
- Laid down: 30 June 1942
- Launched: 31 July 1943
- Commissioned: 31 January 1944
- Fate: Scrapped, July 1945

General characteristics
- Class & type: River-class frigate
- Displacement: 1,370 long tons (1,390 t); 1,830 long tons (1,860 t) (deep load)
- Length: 283 ft (86.26 m) p/p; 301.25 ft (91.82 m)o/a
- Beam: 36.5 ft (11.13 m)
- Draught: 9 ft (2.74 m); 13 ft (3.96 m) (deep load)
- Propulsion: Parsons single reduction steam turbines, 6,500 shp (4,800 kW)
- Speed: 20 knots (37.0 km/h)
- Range: 440 long tons (450 t; 490 short tons) oil fuel; 7,200 nautical miles (13,334 km) at 12 knots (22.2 km/h)
- Complement: 107
- Armament: 2 × QF 4-inch (102 mm) Mk.XIX guns, single mounts CP Mk.XXIII; up to 10 × QF 20 mm Oerlikon AA guns on twin mounts Mk.V and single mounts Mk.III; 1 × Hedgehog 24 spigot A/S projector; up to 150 depth charges

HMS Cam (K264) was a River-class frigate of the Royal Navy (RN) from 1944–1945. She served in convoy defence duties in the North Atlantic during World War II. Cam was built to the RN's specifications as a Group II River-class frigate, though Cam was one of the few powered by a turbine engine.

The River class was a class of 151 frigates launched between 1941 and 1944 for use as anti-submarine convoy escorts and were named for rivers in the United Kingdom. The ships were designed by naval engineer William Reed, of Smith's Dock Company of South Bank-on-Tees, to have the endurance and anti-submarine capabilities of the Black Swan-class sloops, while being quick and cheap to build in civil dockyards using the machinery (e.g. reciprocating steam engines instead of turbines) and construction techniques pioneered in the building of the Flower-class corvettes. Its purpose was to improve on the convoy escort classes in service with the Royal Navy at the time, including the Flower class.

After commissioning in January 1944, Cam participated in anti-submarine warfare exercises off Tobermory, Mull and Lough Foyle before being assigned for convoy escort duty in the North Atlantic. In May and June 1944, Cam participated in the Normandy landings.

On 18 July 1944, Cam was patrolling the English Channel with HMCS Waskesiu, HMCS Grou, and HMCS Outremont with HMCS New Waterford and HMCS Cape Breton nearby. A potential U-boat sighting was reported at 08:30, and the ships sortied to meet it. An explosion occurred whilst Cam was dropping depth charges on the potential target, badly damaging the stern of the ship and injuring 55. Cam was towed by Cape Breton to a buoy off Yarmouth Roads, whilst the most seriously injured were transferred first to New Waterford and then to RNH Haslar. On 19 July, Cam was towed by tug to Portsmouth where she was declared a total loss.

At a subsequent enquiry, it was determined that the depth charges likely hit the wreck of either the ammunition ship Ajax or Crestflower, both of which were sunk in the area on 8 August 1940. American small arm ammunition was found on the deck of Cam post-explosion.

On 22 June 1945, Cam was sold for scrap. In July 1945, she was broken up in Sunderland.
