= HMS Monnow =

River-class frigate of the Royal Navy

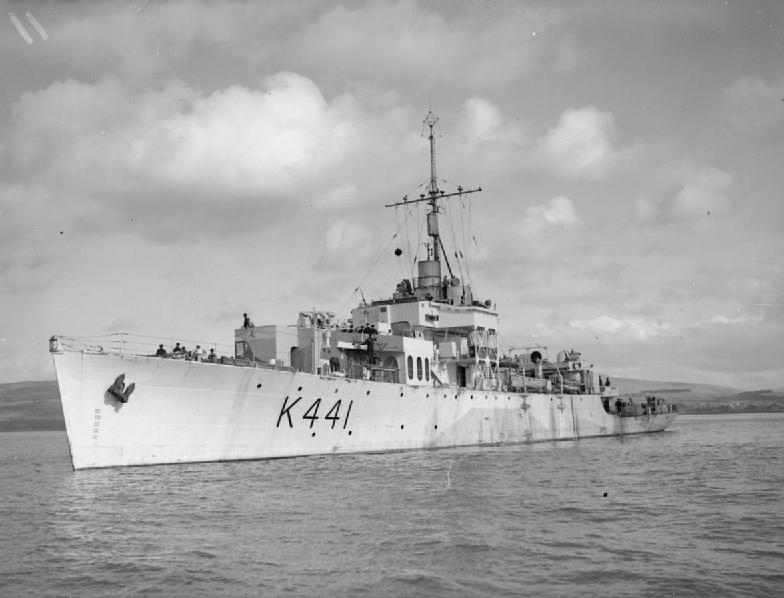
- HMS Monnow, March 1944

History

United Kingdom
- Name: Monnow
- Namesake: River Monnow
- Ordered: 26 December 1942
- Builder: Charles Hill & Sons, Bristol
- Laid down: 28 September 1943
- Launched: 4 December 1943
- Commissioned: 11 May 1944
- Decommissioned: 3 August 1944
- Identification: Pennant number: K 441
- Fate: Transferred to Canada 3 August 1944; Returned 11 June 1945; Sold to Denmark 1945

Canada
- Name: Monnow
- Commissioned: 3 August 1944
- Decommissioned: 11 June 1945
- Identification: pennant number: K 441
- Honours and awards: Atlantic 1944–45, Arctic, 1944–45, North Sea 1945
- Fate: Returned to Royal Navy 1945

Denmark
- Name: Holger Danske
- Namesake: Ogier the Dane
- Commissioned: 20 October 1945
- Decommissioned: 1 August 1959
- Identification: pennant number: F 338
- Fate: Scrapped 1960 at Odense
- Badge

General characteristics
- Class & type: River-class frigate
- Displacement: 1,445 long tons (1,468 t; 1,618 short tons); 2,110 long tons (2,140 t; 2,360 short tons) (deep load)
- Length: 283 ft (86.26 m) p/p; 301.25 ft (91.82 m)o/a
- Beam: 36.5 ft (11.13 m)
- Draught: 9 ft (2.74 m); 13 ft (3.96 m) (deep load)
- Propulsion: 2 × Admiralty 3-drum boilers, 2 shafts, reciprocating vertical triple expansion, 5,500 ihp (4,100 kW)
- Speed: 20 knots (37.0 km/h); 20.5 knots (38.0 km/h) (turbine ships)
- Range: 7,500 nautical miles (13,890 km) at 15 knots (27.8 km/h)
- Endurance: 646 long tons (656 t; 724 short tons) oil fuel
- Complement: 157
- Armament: 2 × QF 4 in (102 mm) /45 Mk. XVI on twin mount HA/LA Mk.XIX; 1 × QF 12 pdr (3 in (76 mm)) 12 cwt /40 Mk. V on mounting HA/LA Mk.IX (not all ships); 8 × 20 mm QF Oerlikon A/A on twin mounts Mk.V; 1 × Hedgehog 24 spigot A/S projector; Up to 150 depth charges

HMS Monnow was a River-class frigate of the Royal Navy. The frigate served as a convoy escort in the Battle of the Atlantic during the Second World War. Named for the River Monnow in the United Kingdom, the vessel was transferred to the Royal Canadian Navy in 1944, keeping the same name, and finished the war with them. Returned to the Royal Navy following the war, it was sold to the Royal Danish Navy and renamed Holger Danske. It served until 1960 when it was scrapped. The ship is significant as it is one of the few ships employed by the Royal Canadian Navy never to visit Canada.

== Service history ==
=== Royal Navy ===
Monnow was ordered on 26 December 1942 as part of the River-class building programme. The keel was laid down on 28 September 1943 by Charles Hill & Sons at Bristol. The vessel was launched on 4 December 1943. The ship was commissioned into the Royal Navy on 11 May 1944 with the pennant number K 441. (Note: Macpherson and Barrie state that the ship was transferred directly to the Royal Canadian Navy on 8 March 1944.) After commissioning, Monnow worked up at Tobermory and served only a few months in the Royal Navy before being transferred officially to the Royal Canadian Navy on 3 August 1944. (Note: See note 1)

Returned to the Royal Navy on 11 June 1945, Monnow was never reactivated in the Royal Navy and was instead sold to the Royal Danish Navy in October 1945.

=== Royal Canadian Navy ===
After the official transfer, Monnow was assigned to the convoy escort group EG 9 based in Londonderry. The frigate spent the majority of its wartime career in British waters with the exception of one convoy round trip to Gibraltar in October 1944. In November 1944, the ship escorted convoy JW 62 to Kola Inlet in Russia and returned to the United Kingdom escorting RA 62.

From 14 March to 20 April 1945, Monnow deployed with the 9th Escort Group in the English Channel. While escorting convoy JW 67 in May 1945, Monnow was detached to escort surrendered U-boats departing Trondheim and making for Loch Eriboll. At the end of the month, the frigate sailed for Sheerness where Monnow was paid off and returned to the Royal Navy on 11 June 1945.

=== Royal Danish Navy ===
The Royal Danish Navy acquired Monnow in October 1945. The frigate was renamed Holger Danske and commissioned 20 October 1945. During its service with the Danish, the ship's main armament was upgraded in 1948 from 4-inch single mounts to 5-inch single mounts. The frigate was mainly used for training purposes. The ship was decommissioned 1 August 1959 and broken up at Odense, Denmark in 1960.
