= HMS Cuckmere =

River-class frigate of the Royal Navy

History

United Kingdom
- Name: Cuckmere
- Namesake: River Cuckmere
- Builder: Canadian Vickers, Montreal
- Laid down: 11 May 1942
- Launched: 24 October 1942
- Commissioned: 14 May 1943
- Fate: Scrapped, 1948

General characteristics
- Class & type: River-class frigate
- Displacement: 1,370 long tons (1,390 t); 1,830 long tons (1,860 t) (deep load)
- Length: 283 ft (86.26 m) p/p; 301.25 ft (91.82 m)o/a
- Beam: 36.5 ft (11.13 m)
- Draught: 9 ft (2.74 m); 13 ft (3.96 m) (deep load)
- Propulsion: 2 × Admiralty 3-drum boilers, 2 shafts, reciprocating vertical triple expansion, 5,500 ihp (4,100 kW)
- Speed: 20 knots (37.0 km/h)
- Range: 440 long tons (450 t; 490 short tons) oil fuel; 7,200 nautical miles (13,334 km) at 12 knots (22.2 km/h)
- Complement: 107
- Armament: 2 × QF 4-inch (102 mm) Mk.XIX guns, single mounts CP Mk.XXIII; up to 10 × QF 20 mm Oerlikon AA guns on twin mounts Mk.V and single mounts Mk.III; 1 × Hedgehog 24 spigot A/S projector; up to 150 depth charges

HMS Cuckmere (K299) was a River-class frigate of the Royal Navy (RN) in 1943. Cuckmere was originally to be built for the United States Navy, having been laid down as PG-104, but was transferred to the Royal Navy as part of Lend-Lease and finished to the RN's specifications as a Group II River-class frigate. She was first Royal Navy ship to carry the name Cuckmere.

The River class was a class of 151 frigates launched between 1941 and 1944 for use as anti-submarine convoy escorts and were named for rivers in the United Kingdom. The ships were designed by naval engineer William Reed, of Smith's Dock Company of South Bank-on-Tees, to have the endurance and anti-submarine capabilities of the Black Swan-class sloops, while being quick and cheap to build in civil dockyards using the machinery (e.g. reciprocating steam engines instead of turbines) and construction techniques pioneered in the building of the Flower-class corvettes. Its purpose was to improve on the convoy escort classes in service with the Royal Navy at the time, including the Flower class.

In October 1943, Cuckmere served as an escort for Operation Torch. In November and December, she served convoy defence in the Western Mediterranean.

At 13:04 on 11 December 1943, Cuckmere was struck by a GNAT torpedo fired by the German submarine U-223 off the coast of Béjaïa while escorting an eastbound convoy, suffering 16 casualties. She was towed to Algiers and subsequently declared a constructive total loss.

She remained at Algiers until after the end of World War II when she then received repairs at Cantieri Navali, Taranto. She returned to US Navy custody 6 November 1946 and was stationed in Brooklyn, New York. In May 1948, she was transferred to the War Shipping Administration and scrapped.
