= HNLMS Johan Maurits van Nassau (1943) =

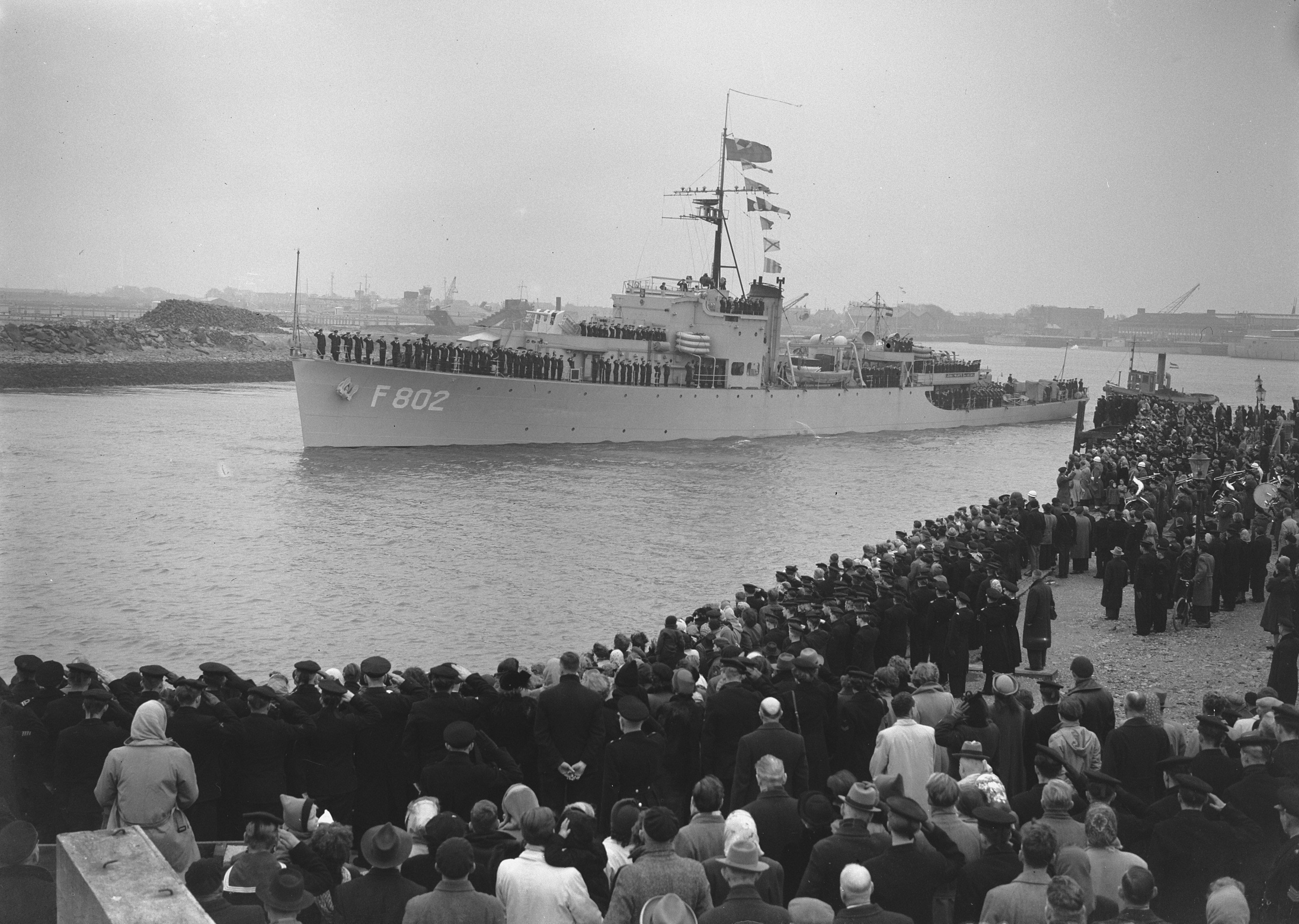
- Johan Maurits van Nassau

History

Netherlands
- Name: Johan Maurits van Nassau
- Namesake: John Maurice, Prince of Nassau-Siegen
- Operator: Royal Netherlands Navy
- Builder: William Simons & Co., Renfrew
- Laid down: 29 December 1942
- Launched: 23 April 1943
- Commissioned: 25 June 1943
- Decommissioned: 18 April 1958
- Identification: F 802
- Fate: Sold for scrap on 15 January 1959 to the firm A. Goslar in Diemen

General characteristics
- Type: River-class frigate
- Displacement: 1,325 t (1,304 long tons)
- Length: 91.9 m (301 ft 6 in)
- Beam: 11.2 m (36 ft 9 in)
- Draught: 4.3 m (14 ft 1 in)
- Propulsion: 2 propellers; 5,500 hp (4,100 kW); 2 x Triple expansion engines; 2 x Admiralty boilers
- Speed: 20 knots (37 km/h; 23 mph)
- Crew: 186
- Armament: 2 x 10.5 cm guns; 2 x 40 mm guns; 5 x 20 mm guns; 1 x Hedgehog; 2 x Depth charge rails with each rail having 14 depth charges; 4 x Depth charge throwers with each thrower having 3 depth charges

HNLMS Johan Maurits van Nassau (F802) was a River-class frigate of the Royal Netherlands Navy (RNN). She was built in the United Kingdom originally for the Royal Navy as HMS Ribble, however, during the construction the frigate was acquired by the RNN. She served in the RNN between 1943 and 1958.

== Construction and design ==
Johan Maurits van Nassau was laid down on 29 December 1942 and launched on 23 April 1943 at the shipyard William Simons & Co. in Renfrew. While the River-class frigate was originally planned to serve in the Royal Navy as HMS Ribble (K 251), the Royal Netherlands Navy acquired the ship shortly before it launched. She was commissioned on 25 June 1943.

== Service history ==
During the Second World War the Johan Maurits van Nassau performed escort duties by providing armed support to convoys in the Atlantic Ocean and the Mediterranean.

On 21 November 1952 the ship left for Korea to take part in maritime operations of the United Nations. For her actions during these operations the Johan Maurits van Nassau was distinguished twice with the Presidential Unit Citation.

The frigate was decommissioned on 18 April 1958 and sold for scrap on 15 January 1959 for 257.654 Dutch Guilders to the firm A. Goslar in Diemen.

== See also ==
- List of frigates of the Netherlands
