= HMCS Longueuil =

- HMCS Longueuil

History

Canada
- Name: Longueuil
- Namesake: Longueuil, Quebec
- Operator: Royal Canadian Navy
- Ordered: October 1941
- Builder: Canadian Vickers, Montreal
- Yard number: 172
- Laid down: 17 July 1943
- Launched: 30 October 1943
- Commissioned: 18 May 1944
- Decommissioned: 31 December 1946
- Identification: Pennant number: K672
- Honours and awards: Atlantic 1944-45
- Fate: Scuttled for an artificial breakwater at Kelsey Bay 1947.

General characteristics
- Class & type: River-class frigate
- Displacement: 1,445 long tons (1,468 t; 1,618 short tons); 2,110 long tons (2,140 t; 2,360 short tons) (deep load)
- Length: 283 ft (86.26 m) p/p; 301.25 ft (91.82 m)o/a
- Beam: 36.5 ft (11.13 m)
- Draught: 9 ft (2.74 m); 13 ft (3.96 m) (deep load)
- Propulsion: 2 × Admiralty 3-drum boilers, 2 shafts, reciprocating vertical triple expansion, 5,500 ihp (4,100 kW)
- Speed: 20 knots (37.0 km/h); 20.5 knots (38.0 km/h) (turbine ships)
- Range: 646 long tons (656 t; 724 short tons) oil fuel; 7,500 nautical miles (13,890 km) at 15 knots (27.8 km/h)
- Complement: 157
- Armament: 2 × QF 4 in (102 mm) /45 Mk. XVI on twin mount HA/LA Mk.XIX; 1 × QF 12 pdr (3 in (76 mm)) 12 cwt /40 Mk. V on mounting HA/LA Mk.IX (not all ships); 8 × 20 mm QF Oerlikon A/A on twin mounts Mk.V; 1 × Hedgehog 24 spigot A/S projector; up to 150 depth charges

HMCS Longueuil was a River-class frigate that served in the Royal Canadian Navy during the Second World War. She served primarily as a convoy escort in the Battle of the Atlantic. She was named for Longueuil, Quebec.

Longueuil was ordered in October 1941 as part of the 1942-1943 River-class building program. She was laid down on 17 July 1943 by Canadian Vickers Ltd. at Montreal and launched on 30 October 1943. Longueuil was commissioned into the RCN at Quebec City on 18 May 1944 with the pennant K672.

== War service ==
She arrived at her homeport of Halifax, Nova Scotia and undertook work up training at Bermuda under the command of Lt. Cdr. M.J. Woods, RCNVR, her only commanding officer.

Her first convoy escort took place with Convoy HX 302 which departed New York City on 4 August 1944 and arrived at Liverpool on 17 August. Longueuil was deployed with the convoy from 8 August until 13 August.

With victory in Europe seemingly imminent, the RCN deployed Longueuil to Esquimalt in June 1945 in preparation for Operation Downfall, the Allied invasion of Japan. Longueuil joined the RCN's Pacific Fleet only weeks before the Surrender of Japan following the atomic bombings of Hiroshima and Nagasaki. She began a tropicalization refit in preparation for her service in the Pacific Ocean, but that was cancelled upon the surrender of Japan. Longueuil was paid off from the RCN on 31 December 1946 and the decision was made to dismantle her armaments and scuttle her to form a breakwater in Kelsey Bay, British Columbia in 1947.

== See also ==
- List of ships of the Canadian Navy
