= HMCS Sea Cliff =

1944 River-class frigate

History

Canada
- Name: Sea Cliff
- Namesake: Leamington, Ontario
- Operator: Royal Canadian Navy
- Ordered: 1 February 1943
- Builder: Davie Shipbuilding, Lauzon
- Laid down: 20 July 1943
- Launched: 7 August 1944
- Commissioned: 26 September 1944
- Decommissioned: 28 November 1945
- Identification: Pennant number:K 344
- Honours and awards: Atlantic 1944–45
- Fate: Transferred to Chile 30 March 1946

Chile
- Name: Covadonga
- Operator: Chilean Navy
- Acquired: 30 March 1946
- Commissioned: 25 June 1946
- Out of service: discarded 1966
- Fate: Turned into pontoon 1967, sunk 1987

General characteristics
- Class & type: River-class frigate
- Displacement: 1,445 long tons (1,468 t; 1,618 short tons); 2,110 long tons (2,140 t; 2,360 short tons) (deep load)
- Length: 283 ft (86.26 m) p/p; 301.25 ft (91.82 m)o/a
- Beam: 36.5 ft (11.13 m)
- Draught: 9 ft (2.74 m); 13 ft (3.96 m) (deep load)
- Propulsion: 2 x Admiralty 3-drum boilers, 2 shafts, reciprocating vertical triple expansion, 5,500 ihp (4,100 kW)
- Speed: 20 knots (37.0 km/h); 20.5 knots (38.0 km/h) (turbine ships)
- Range: 646 long tons (656 t; 724 short tons) oil fuel; 7,500 nautical miles (13,890 km) at 15 knots (27.8 km/h)
- Complement: 157
- Armament: 2 × QF 4 in (102 mm) /45 Mk. XVI on twin mount HA/LA Mk.XIX; 1 × QF 12 pdr (3 in (76 mm)) 12 cwt /40 Mk. V on mounting HA/LA Mk.IX (not all ships); 8 × 20 mm QF Oerlikon A/A on twin mounts Mk.V; 1 × Hedgehog 24 spigot A/S projector; up to 150 depth charges

HMCS Sea Cliff was a River-class frigate that served with the Royal Canadian Navy during the Second World War. She served primarily as a convoy escort in the Battle of the Atlantic. She was named for Leamington, Ontario, but due to possible confusion with HMS Leamington, she was given a name associated with the town. Following the war, she was sold to the Chilean Navy and renamed Covadonga.

Originally named Megantic, she was ordered on 1 February 1943 as part of the 1943–1944 River-class building program. She was laid down on 20 July 1943 by Davie Shipbuilding and Repairing Co. Ltd. at Lauzon, Quebec and launched 7 August 1944. She was commissioned into the Royal Canadian Navy on 26 September 1944 at Quebec City.

== Background ==
The River-class frigate was designed by William Reed of Smith's Dock Company of South Bank-on-Tees. Originally called a "twin-screw corvette", its purpose was to improve on the convoy escort classes in service with the Royal Navy at the time, including the Flower-class corvette. The first orders were placed by the Royal Navy in 1940 and the vessels were named for rivers in the United Kingdom, giving name to the class. In Canada they were named for towns and cities though they kept the same designation. The name "frigate" was suggested by Vice-Admiral Percy Nelles of the Royal Canadian Navy and was adopted later that year.

Improvements over the corvette design included improved accommodation which was markedly better. The twin engines gave only three more knots of speed but extended the range of the ship to nearly double that of a corvette at 7,200 nautical miles (13,300 km) at 12 knots. Among other lessons applied to the design was an armament package better designed to combat U-boats including a twin 4-inch mount forward and 12-pounder aft. 15 Canadian frigates were initially fitted with a single 4-inch gun forward but with the exception of HMCS Valleyfield, they were all eventually upgraded to the double mount. For underwater targets, the River-class frigate was equipped with a Hedgehog anti-submarine mortar and depth charge rails aft and four side-mounted throwers.

River-class frigates were the first Royal Canadian Navy warships to carry the 147B Sword horizontal fan echo sonar transmitter in addition to the irregular ASDIC. This allowed the ship to maintain contact with targets even while firing unless a target was struck. Improved radar and direction-finding equipment improved the RCN's ability to find and track enemy submarines over the previous classes.

Canada originally ordered the construction of 33 frigates in October 1941. The design was too big for the shipyards on the Great Lakes so all the frigates built in Canada were built in dockyards along the west coast or along the St. Lawrence River. In all Canada ordered the construction of 60 frigates, including ten for the Royal Navy. Two of the RN's ships were transferred to the United States Navy.

== War service ==
After working up in Bermuda in November 1944, Sea Cliff was assigned to the Mid-Ocean Escort Force escort group C-3 and began work as a trans-Atlantic convoy escort in December. She remained in this service until May 1945 when she returned to Canada. She was sent to Liverpool, Nova Scotia to begin a tropicalization refit in preparation for service in the southern Pacific Ocean. This meant adding refrigeration and water-cooling capabilities and changing the camouflage. The refit was started on 10 June, however due to the surrender of Japan, it was stopped on 28 August 1945. Sea Cliff was paid off 28 November 1945 at Halifax, Nova Scotia and placed in reserve at Shelburne.

== Postwar service ==
Sea Cliff was sold to Chile 30 March 1946 and renamed Covadonga. She arrived on 25 June 1946 and began service with the Chilean Navy. She participated in the first Chilean Antarctic Expedition in which the Base General Bernardo O'Higgins Riquelme was established. She served until 1968 when she was sold and turned into a wharfside pontoon.
