= HMCS Carlplace =

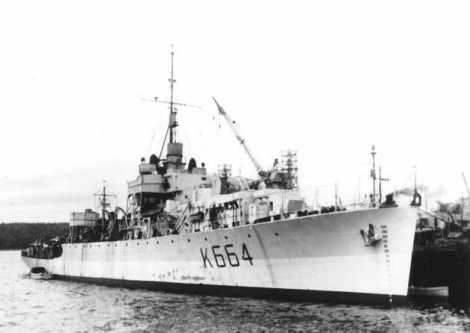
- HMCS Carlplace

History

Canada
- Name: Carlplace
- Namesake: Carleton Place, Ontario
- Ordered: 1 February 1943
- Builder: Davie Shipbuilding, Lauzon
- Yard number: 561
- Laid down: 30 November 1943
- Launched: 6 July 1944
- Commissioned: 13 December 1944
- Decommissioned: 13 December 1945
- Identification: Pennant number:K 664
- Honours and awards: Atlantic, 1945
- Fate: Sold to Dominican Republic 1946.

Dominican Republic
- Name: Presidente Trujillo
- Namesake: Rafael Trujillo
- Acquired: purchased 1946
- Commissioned: 1946
- Decommissioned: 1998
- Renamed: Mella (1962)
- Home port: Santo Domingo
- Identification: F 101

General characteristics
- Class & type: River-class frigate
- Displacement: 1,445 long tons (1,468 t; 1,618 short tons); 2,110 long tons (2,140 t; 2,360 short tons) (deep load)
- Length: 283 ft (86.26 m) p/p; 301.25 ft (91.82 m) o/a
- Beam: 36.5 ft (11.13 m)
- Draught: 9 ft (2.74 m); 13 ft (3.96 m) (deep load)
- Propulsion: 2 x Admiralty 3-drum boilers, 2 shafts, reciprocating vertical triple expansion, 5,500 ihp (4,100 kW)
- Speed: 20 knots (37.0 km/h); 20.5 knots (38.0 km/h) (turbine ships)
- Range: 646 long tons (656 t; 724 short tons) oil fuel; 7,500 nautical miles (13,890 km) at 15 knots (27.8 km/h)
- Complement: 157
- Armament: 2 × QF 4 in (102 mm)/45 Mk. XVI on twin mount HA/LA Mk.XIX; 8 × 20 mm QF Oerlikon A/A on twin mounts Mk.V; 1 × Hedgehog 24 spigot A/S projector; up to 150 depth charges

HMCS Carlplace was a River-class frigate that served with the Royal Canadian Navy during the Second World War. She served primarily as an ocean convoy escort in the Battle of the Atlantic. After the war, she was sold to the Dominican Republic and renamed Presidente Trujillo and in 1962, Mella.

Carlplace was named for Carleton Place, Ontario, a town located in Eastern Ontario. The town's name was considered too long and was shortened.

Carlplace was ordered 1 February 1943 as part of the 1943–1944 River-class building program. She was laid down on 30 November 1943 by Davie Shipbuilding & Repairing Co. Ltd. at Lauzon and launched 6 July 1944. She was commissioned into the Royal Canadian Navy on 13 December 1944 at Quebec City.

== Background ==
The River-class frigate was designed by William Reed of Smith's Dock Company of South Bank-on-Tees. Originally called a "twin-screw corvette", its purpose was to improve on the convoy escort classes in service with the Royal Navy at the time, including the Flower-class corvette. The first orders were placed by the Royal Navy in 1940 and the vessels were named for rivers in the United Kingdom, giving name to the class. In Canada they were named for towns and cities though they kept the same designation. The name "frigate" was suggested by Vice-Admiral Percy Nelles of the Royal Canadian Navy and was adopted later that year.

Improvements over the corvette design included improved accommodation which was markedly better. The twin engines gave only three more knots of speed but extended the range of the ship to nearly double that of a corvette at 7,200 nautical miles (13,300 km) at 12 knots. Among other lessons applied to the design was an armament package better designed to combat U-boats including a twin 4-inch mount forward and 12-pounder aft. 15 Canadian frigates were initially fitted with a single 4-inch gun forward but with the exception of HMCS Valleyfield, they were all eventually upgraded to the double mount. For underwater targets, the River-class frigate was equipped with a Hedgehog anti-submarine mortar and depth charge rails aft and four side-mounted throwers.

River-class frigates were the first Royal Canadian Navy warships to carry the 147B Sword horizontal fan echo sonar transmitter in addition to the irregular ASDIC. This allowed the ship to maintain contact with targets even while firing unless a target was struck. Improved radar and direction-finding equipment improved the RCN's ability to find and track enemy submarines over the previous classes.

Canada originally ordered the construction of 33 frigates in October 1941. The design was too big for the shipyards on the Great Lakes so all the frigates built in Canada were built in dockyards along the west coast or along the St. Lawrence River. In all Canada ordered the construction of 60 frigates including ten for the Royal Navy that transferred two to the United States Navy.

== Service history ==
Making her way to Halifax, Nova Scotia after her commissioning, Carlplace was seriously damaged by ice and took several weeks to repair at Halifax and eventually, Philadelphia. After repairing she proceeded to work up at Bermuda and upon her return was assigned to escort group EG 16 based out of Derry. En route to joining her group in Europe, Carplace escorted a Royal Navy submarine. She arrived in the United Kingdom in April and escorted two convoys to Gibraltar. In May she returned to Canada to undergo a tropicalization refit in preparation for service in the Pacific Ocean. The refit began on 2 June 1945 at Saint John, New Brunswick, switching to Shelburne, Nova Scotia on 10 July before being called off on 20 August. Following the Surrender of Japan and the end of the war, Carlplace was paid off 13 November 1945 and laid up at Shelburne.

=== Dominican Navy ===
Carlplace was sold to the Dominican Republic in 1946 and named Presidente Trujillo for President Rafael Trujillo. She was modified for use to a presidential yacht. Modifications included extra accommodation and deck-houses were built aft. In 1962, with the fall of Rafael Trujillo, she was renamed Mella and used as a training craft. She was armed with one 76.2 mm, two 40 mm and four 20 mm guns. She was also fitted out with an American radar installation.

In 1963, Mella was used to take the overthrown President Juan Bosch back into exile. In 1965, she took part in the bombardment of Santo Domingo during the Dominican Civil War. During the 1970s, Mella became known as a site for lavish parties among the naval elite. From 1970 to 1974, she was the only frigate in the Dominican fleet able to go to sea. Mella was deleted from the registry and turned into a museum ship in 1998. In 2003 the Dominican Republic offered her to Carleton Place as a museum ship, however the offer was turned down due to the poor condition of the ship and the limited ability to return her to her original state as a River-class frigate. In 2010, Carleton Place was given a framed photo of the ship, a brief history and a photo of the ship's badge by the Department of National Defence in Canada as part of the Canadian Naval Centennial.
