= HMCS Cape Breton (K350) =

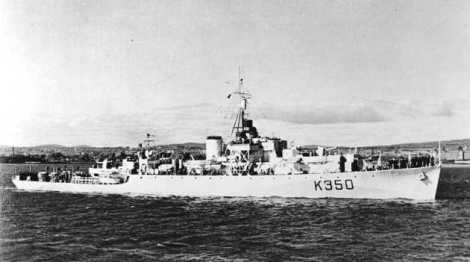
- HMCS Cape Breton

History

Canada
- Name: Cape Breton
- Namesake: Cape Breton Island
- Ordered: October 1941
- Builder: Morton Engineering and Dry Dock Company, Quebec City
- Yard number: 26
- Laid down: 5 May 1942
- Launched: 26 November 1942
- Commissioned: 25 October 1943
- Decommissioned: 26 January 1946
- Identification: pennant number:K 350
- Honours and awards: Arctic 1944, Normandy 1944, Atlantic 1944-45
- Fate: Sold 1947, hull expended as breakwater in British Columbia

General characteristics
- Class & type: River-class frigate
- Displacement: 1,445 long tons (1,468 t; 1,618 short tons); 2,110 long tons (2,140 t; 2,360 short tons) (deep load)
- Length: 283 ft (86.26 m) p/p; 301.25 ft (91.82 m) o/a
- Beam: 36.5 ft (11.13 m)
- Draught: 9 ft (2.74 m); 13 ft (3.96 m) (deep load)
- Propulsion: 2 × Admiralty 3-drum boilers, 2 shafts, reciprocating vertical triple expansion, 5,500 ihp (4,100 kW)
- Speed: 20 knots (37.0 km/h); 20.5 knots (38.0 km/h) (turbine ships)
- Range: 646 long tons (656 t; 724 short tons) oil fuel; 7,500 nautical miles (13,890 km) at 15 knots (27.8 km/h)
- Complement: 157
- Armament: 2 × QF 4 in (102 mm)/45 Mk. XVI on twin mount HA/LA Mk.XIX; 1 × QF 12 pdr (3 in (76 mm)) 12 cwt /40 Mk. V on mounting HA/LA Mk.IX (not all ships); 8 × 20 mm QF Oerlikon A/A on twin mounts Mk.V; 1 × Hedgehog 24 spigot A/S projector; up to 150 depth charges

HMCS Cape Breton was a River-class frigate that served the Royal Canadian Navy (RCN) during the Second World War. She served primarily as a convoy escort in the Battle of the Atlantic during the war. She was named for Cape Breton Island in Nova Scotia. She was the first to carry her name, HMCS Cape Breton was the second.

Cape Breton was ordered in October 1941 as part of the 1942-43 River-class building program. She was laid down 5 May 1942 by Morton Engineering and Dry Dock Company in Quebec City, Quebec and launched on 24 November later that year. Cape Breton was commissioned into the RCN on 25 October 1943 at Quebec City.

== Background ==
The River-class frigate was designed by William Reed of Smith's Dock Company of South Bank-on-Tees. Originally called a "twin-screw corvette", its purpose was to improve on the convoy escort classes in service with the Royal Navy at the time, including the Flower-class corvette. The first orders were placed by the Royal Navy in 1940 and the vessels were named for rivers in the United Kingdom, giving name to the class. In Canada they were named after towns and cities though they kept the same designation. The name "frigate" was suggested by Vice-Admiral Percy Nelles of the Royal Canadian Navy and was adopted later that year.

Improvements over the corvette design included improved accommodation which was markedly better. The twin engines gave only three more knots of speed but extended the range of the ship to nearly double that of a corvette at 7,200 nautical miles (13,300 km) at 12 knots. Among other lessons applied to the design was an armament package better designed to combat U-boats including a twin 4-inch mount forward and 12-pounder aft. 15 Canadian frigates were initially fitted with a single 4-inch gun forward but with the exception of HMCS Valleyfield, they were all eventually upgraded to the double mount. For underwater targets, the River-class frigate was equipped with a Hedgehog anti-submarine mortar and depth charge rails aft and four side-mounted throwers.

River-class frigates were the first Royal Canadian Navy warships to carry the 147B Sword horizontal fan echo sonar transmitter in addition to the irregular ASDIC. This allowed the ship to maintain contact with targets even while firing unless a target was struck. Improved radar and direction-finding equipment improved the RCN's ability to find and track enemy submarines over the previous classes.

Canada originally ordered the construction of 33 frigates in October 1941. The design was too big for the shipyards on the Great Lakes so all the frigates built in Canada were built in dockyards along the west coast or along the St. Lawrence River. In all Canada ordered the construction of 60 frigates including ten for the Royal Navy that transferred two to the United States Navy.

== Service history ==
After her commissioning, Cape Breton worked up in St. Margaret's Bay before being assigned to Escort Group 9 in 1944 based out of Derry. She operated out of several ports throughout England and in April 1944, sailed to North Russia returning with a convoy. Cape Breton participated in Operation Neptune, the naval part of the Normandy landings in June 1944.

Cape Breton returned to Canada late in 1944 where she underwent a major refit at Shelburne, Nova Scotia. This took until April 1945, after which she was sent to Bermuda to work up. She returned to EG 9 upon her reactivation, escorting her final convoy in May 1945 before making her way to Vancouver for a tropicalization refit. The refit, begun on 26 June, was cancelled before completion and Cape Breton was paid off 26 January 1946 and laid up at Esquimalt, British Columbia. She was sold in 1947 to Capital Iron & Metals Ltd., Victoria, British Columbia and her hull was expended as a breakwater at Kelsey Bay, British Columbia in 1948.
