= List of Royal Canadian Navy ships of the Second World War =

Royal Canadian Navy ensign flown on all RCN ships in the Second World War

The Royal Canadian Navy (RCN) expanded rapidly and substantially during the Second World War, with vessels transferred or purchased from the Royal Navy and US Navy, and the construction of many vessels in Canada, such as corvettes and frigates. The RCN ended the war with the third-largest naval fleet in the world, and an operational reach extending into the Atlantic, Pacific, Caribbean and Mediterranean. The List of Royal Canadian Navy ships of the Second World War lists over 1,140 surface warships, submarines and auxiliary vessels in service during the war. It includes all commissioned, non-commissioned, loaned or hired ships, and all ships crewed by RCN personnel, including 30 depot ships (or "stone frigates"), under the command of the RCN.

== Surface vessels ==
=== Escort carriers ===
- HMS Nabob (D77) (Ruler class)
- HMS Puncher (D79) (Ruler class)

=== Light cruisers ===
- HMCS Uganda (C66) (Crown Colony class, later renamed HMCS Quebec (C66))
- HMCS Ontario (C53) (Minotaur class)

=== Armed merchant cruiser ===
- HMCS Prince David (F89) (Prince class)
- HMCS Prince Henry (F70) (Prince class)
- HMCS Prince Robert (F56) (Prince class)

=== Destroyers ===
- HMCS Saguenay (D79) (A class)
- HMCS Skeena (D59) (A class)
- HMCS Assiniboine (I18) (C class)
- HMCS Fraser (H48) (C class)
- HMCS Ottawa (H60) (C class)
- HMCS Restigouche (H00) (C class)
- HMCS St. Laurent (H83) (C class)
- HMCS Crescent (R16) (Cr class)
- HMCS Crusader (R20) (Cr class)
- HMCS Kootenay (H75) (D class)
- HMCS Margaree (H49) (D class)
- HMCS Gatineau (H61) (E class)
- HMCS Qu'Appelle (H69) (F class)
- HMCS Saskatchewan (H70) (F class)
- HMCS Ottawa (H31) (G class)
- HMCS Chaudière (H99) (H class)
- HMCS Annapolis (I04)(Wickes class)
- HMCS Columbia (I49) (Wickes class)
- HMCS Niagara (I57) (Wickes class)
- HMCS St. Clair (I65) (Wickes class)
- HMCS Buxton (H96) (Clemson class)
- HMCS St. Croix (I81) (Clemson class)
- HMCS St. Francis (I93) (Clemson class)
- HMCS Athabaskan (G07) (Tribal class)
- HMCS Athabaskan (R79) (Tribal class)
- HMCS Cayuga (R04) (Tribal class)
- HMCS Haida (G63) (Tribal class)
- HMCS Huron (G24) (Tribal class)
- HMCS Iroquois (G89) (Tribal class)
- HMCS Micmac (R10) (Tribal class)
- HMCS Nootka (R96) (Tribal class)
- HMCS Algonquin (R17) (V class)
- HMCS Sioux (R64) (V class)
- HMS Caldwell (I20) (Town class)*
- HMS Chelsea (I35) (Town class)*
- HMS Georgetown (I40) (Town class)*
- HMCS Hamilton (I24) (Town class)*
- HMS Leamington (G19) (Town class)*
- HMS Mansfield (G76) (Town class)*
- HMS Montgomery (G95) (Town class)*
- HMS Richmond (G88) (Town class)*
- HMS Roxborough (I07) (Town class)*
- HMS Salisbury (I52) (Town class)*

*(US Navy Wickes and Clemson-class vessels commissioned into the Royal Navy as Town class, and later loaned to the RCN. Some also commissioned into the RCN.)

=== Frigates ===
- HMCS Annan (K404) (River class)
- HMCS Antigonish (K661) (River class)
- HMCS Beacon Hill (K407) (River class)
- HMCS Buckingham (K685) (River class)
- HMCS Cap de la Madeleine (K663) (River class)
- HMCS Cape Breton (K350) (River class)
- HMCS Capilano (K409) (River class)
- HMCS Carlplace (K664) (River class)
- HMCS Charlottetown (K244) (River class)
- HMCS Chebogue (K317) (River class)
- HMCS Coaticook (K410) (River class)
- HMCS Eastview (K665) (River class)
- HMCS Ettrick (K254) (River class)
- HMCS Fort Erie (K670) (River class)
- HMCS Glace Bay (K414) (River class)
- HMCS Grou (K518) (River class)
- HMCS Hallowell (K666) (River class)
- HMCS Inch Arran (K667) (River class)
- HMCS Joliette (K418) (River class)
- HMCS Jonquiere (K318) (River class)
- HMCS Kirkland Lake (K337) (River class)
- HMCS Kokanee (K419) (River class)
- HMCS La Hulloise (K668) (River class)
- HMCS Lanark (K669) (River class)
- HMCS Lasalle (K519) (River class)
- HMCS Lauzon (K371) (River class)
- HMCS Levis (K400) (River class)
- HMCS Longueuil (K672) (River class)
- HMCS Magog (K673) (River class)
- HMCS Matane (K444) (River class)
- HMCS Meon (K269) (River class)
- HMCS Monnow (K441) (River class)
- HMCS Montreal (K319) (River class)
- HMCS Nene (K270) (River class)
- HMCS New Glasgow (K320) (River class)
- HMCS New Waterford (K321) (River class)
- HMCS Orkney (K448) (River class)
- HMCS Outremont (K322) (River class)
- HMCS Penetang (K676) (River class)
- HMCS Port Colborne (K326) (River class)
- HMCS Poundmaker (K675) (River class)
- HMCS Prestonian (K662) (River class)
- HMCS Prince Rupert (K324) (River class)
- HMCS Ribble (K525) (River class)
- HMCS Royal Mount (K677) (River class)
- HMCS Runnymede (K678) (River class)
- HMCS Sea Cliff (K344) (River class, originally Megantic)
- HMCS Springhill (K323) (River class)
- HMCS St. Catharines (K325) (River class)
- HMCS Saint John (K456) (River class)
- HMCS St. Pierre (K680) (River class)
- HMCS St. Stephen (K454) (River class)
- HMCS Ste. Therese (K366) (River class)
- HMCS Stettler (K681) (River class)
- HMCS Stone Town (K531) (River class)
- HMCS Stormont (K327) (River class)
- HMCS Strathadam (K682) (River class)
- HMCS Sussexvale (K683) (River class)
- HMCS Swansea (K328) (River class)
- HMCS Teme (K458) (River class)
- HMCS Thetford Mines (K459) (River class)
- HMCS Toronto (K538) (River class)
- HMCS Valleyfield (K329) (River class)
- HMCS Victoriaville (K684) (River class)
- HMCS Waskesiu (K330) (River class)
- HMCS Wentworth (K331) (River class)
- HMCS Loch Achanalt (K424) (Loch class)
- HMCS Loch Alvie (K428) (Loch class)
- HMCS Loch Morlich (K517) (Loch class)

=== Corvettes ===
- HMCS Agassiz (K129) (Flower class)
- HMCS Alberni (K103) (Flower class)
- HMCS Algoma (K127) (Flower class)
- HMCS Amherst (K148) (Flower class)
- HMCS Arrowhead (K145) (Flower class)
- HMCS Arvida (K113) (Flower class)
- HMCS Asbestos (K358) (Flower class)
- HMCS Atholl (K15) (Flower class)
- HMCS Baddeck (K147) (Flower class)
- HMCS Barrie (K138) (Flower class)
- HMCS Battleford (K165) (Flower class)
- HMCS Beauharnois (K540) (Flower class)
- HMCS Belleville (K332) (Flower class)
- HMCS Bittersweet (K182) (Flower class)
- HMCS Brandon (K149) (Flower class)
- HMCS Brantford (K218) (Flower class)
- HMCS Buctouche (K179) (Flower class)
- HMCS Calgary (K231) (Flower class)
- HMCS Camrose (K154) (Flower class)
- HMCS Chambly (K116) (Flower class)
- HMCS Charlottetown (K244) (Flower class)
- HMCS Chicoutimi (K156) (Flower class)
- HMCS Chilliwack (K131) (Flower class)
- HMCS Cobalt (K124) (Flower class)
- HMCS Cobourg (K333) (Flower class)
- HMCS Collingwood (K180) (Flower class)
- HMCS Dauphin (K157) (Flower class)
- HMCS Dawson (K104) (Flower class)
- HMCS Drumheller (K167) (Flower class)
- HMCS Dundas (K229) (Flower class)
- HMCS Dunvegan (K177) (Flower class)
- HMCS Edmundston (K106) (Flower class)
- HMCS Eyebright (K150) (Flower class)
- HMCS Fennel (K194) (Flower class)
- HMCS Fergus (K686) (Flower class)
- HMCS Forrest Hill (K486) (Flower class)
- HMCS Fredericton (K245) (Flower class)
- HMCS Frontenac (K335) (Flower class)
- HMCS Galt (K163) (Flower class)
- HMCS Giffard (K402) (Flower class)
- HMCS Guelph (K687) (Flower class)
- HMCS Halifax (K237) (Flower class)
- HMCS Hawkesbury (K415) (Flower class)
- HMCS Hepatica (K159) (Flower class)
- HMCS Kamloops (K176) (Flower class)
- HMCS Kamsack (K171) (Flower class)
- HMCS Kenogami (K125) (Flower class)
- HMCS Kitchener (K225) (Flower class)
- HMCS La Malbaie (K273) (Flower class)
- HMCS Lachute (K440) (Flower class)
- HMCS Lethbridge (K160) (Flower class)
- HMCS Levis (K115) (Flower class)
- HMCS Lindsay (K338) (Flower class)
- HMCS Long Branch (K487) (Flower class)
- HMCS Louisburg (K143) (Flower class)
- HMCS Louisburg (K401) (Flower class)
- HMCS Lunenburg (K151) (Flower class)
- HMCS Matapedia (K112) (Flower class)
- HMCS Mayflower (K191) (Flower class)
- HMCS Merrittonia (K688) (Flower class)
- HMCS Midland (K220) (Flower class)
- HMCS Mimico (K485) (Flower class)
- HMCS Moncton (K139) (Flower class)
- HMCS Moose Jaw (K164) (Flower class)
- HMCS Morden (K170) (Flower class)
- HMCS Nanaimo (K101) (Flower class)
- HMCS Napanee (K118) (Flower class)
- HMCS New Westminster (K228) (Flower class)
- HMCS Norsyd (K520) (Flower class)
- HMCS North Bay (K339) (Flower class)
- HMCS Oakville (K178) (Flower class)
- HMCS Orillia (K119) (Flower class)
- HMCS Owen Sound (K340) (Flower class)
- HMCS Parry Sound (K341) (Flower class)
- HMCS Peterborough (K342) (Flower class)
- HMCS Pictou (K146) (Flower class)
- HMCS Port Arthur (K233) (Flower class)
- HMCS Prescott (K161) (Flower class)
- HMCS Quesnel (K133) (Flower class)
- HMCS Regina (K234) (Flower class)
- HMCS Rimouski (K121) (Flower class)
- HMCS Rivière du Loup (K357) (Flower class)
- HMCS Rosthern (K169) (Flower class)
- HMCS St. Lambert (K343) (Flower class)
- HMCS Sackville (K181) (Flower class)
- HMCS Saskatoon (K158) (Flower class)
- HMCS Shawinigan (K136) (Flower class)
- HMCS Shediac (K110) (Flower class)
- HMCS Sherbrooke (K152) (Flower class)
- HMCS Smiths Falls (K345) (Flower class)
- HMCS Snowberry (K166) (Flower class)
- HMCS Sorel (K153) (Flower class)
- HMCS Spikenard (K198) (Flower class)
- HMCS Stellarton (K457) (Flower class)
- HMCS Strathroy (K455) (Flower class)
- HMCS Sudbury (K162) (Flower class)
- HMCS Summerside (K141) (Flower class)
- HMCS The Pas (K168) (Flower class)
- HMCS Thorlock (K394) (Flower class)
- HMCS Timmins (K223) (Flower class)
- HMCS Trail (K174) (Flower class)
- HMCS Trentonian (K368) (Flower class)
- HMCS Trillium (K172) (Flower class)
- HMCS Vancouver (K240) (Flower class)
- HMCS Ville de Québec (K242) (Flower class)
- HMCS Wetaskiwin (K175) (Flower class)
- HMCS Weyburn (K173) (Flower class)
- HMCS West York (K369) (Flower class)
- HMCS Whitby (K346) (Flower class)
- HMCS Windflower (K155) (Flower class)
- HMCS Woodstock (K238) (Flower class)
- HMCS Arnprior (K494) (Castle class)
- HMCS Bowmanville (K493) (Castle class)
- HMCS Copper Cliff (K495) (Castle class)
- HMCS Hespeler (K489) (Castle class)
- HMCS Humberstone (K497) (Castle class)
- HMCS Huntsville (K499) (Castle class)
- HMCS Kincardine (K490) (Castle class)
- HMCS Leaside (K492) (Castle class)
- HMCS Orangeville (K491) (Castle class)
- HMCS Petrolia (K498) (Castle class)
- HMCS St. Thomas (K488) (Castle class)
- HMCS Tillsonburg (K496) (Castle class)

=== Minesweepers ===
- HMCS Border Cities (J344) (Algerine class)
- HMCS Fort Frances (J396) (Algerine class)
- HMCS Kapuskasing (J326) (Algerine class)
- HMCS Middlesex (J328) (Algerine class)
- HMCS New Liskeard (J397) (Algerine class)
- HMCS Oshawa (J330) (Algerine class)
- HMCS Portage (J331) (Algerine class)
- HMCS Rockcliffe (J335) (Algerine class)
- HMCS Sault Ste. Marie (J334) (Algerine class)
- HMCS St. Boniface (J332) (Algerine class)
- HMCS Wallaceburg (J336) (Algerine class)
- HMCS Winnipeg (J337) (Algerine class)
- HMCS Bayfield (J08) (Bangor class)
- HMCS Bellechasse (J170) (Bangor class)
- HMCS Blairmore (J314) (Bangor class)
- HMCS Brockville (J270) (Bangor class)
- HMCS Burlington (J250) (Bangor class)
- HMCS Canso (J21) (Bangor class)
- HMCS Caraquet (J38) (Bangor class)
- HMCS Chedabucto (J168) (Bangor class)
- HMCS Chignecto (J160) (Bangor class)
- HMCS Clayoquot (J174) (Bangor class)
- HMCS Courtenay (J262) (Bangor class)
- HMCS Cowichan (J146) (Bangor class)
- HMCS Digby (J267) (Bangor class)
- HMCS Drummondville (J253) (Bangor class)
- HMCS Esquimalt (J272) (Bangor class)
- HMCS Fort William (J311) (Bangor class)
- HMCS Gananoque (J259) (Bangor class)
- HMCS Georgian (J144) (Bangor class)
- HMCS Goderich (J260) (Bangor class)
- HMCS Granby (J264) (Bangor class)
- HMCS Grandmère (J258) (Bangor class)
- HMCS Guysborough (J52) (Bangor class)
- HMCS Ingonish (J69) (Bangor class)
- HMCS Kelowna (J261) (Bangor class)
- HMCS Kenora (J281) (Bangor class)
- HMCS Kentville (J312) (Bangor class)
- HMCS Lachine (J266) (Bangor class)
- HMCS Lockeport (J100) (Bangor class)
- HMCS Mahone (J159) (Bangor class)
- HMCS Malpeque (J148) (Bangor class)
- HMCS Medicine Hat (J256) (Bangor class)
- HMCS Melville (J263) (Bangor class)
- HMCS Milltown (J317) (Bangor class)
- HMCS Minas (J165) (Bangor class)
- HMCS Miramichi (J169) (Bangor class)
- HMCS Mulgrave (J313) (Bangor class)
- HMCS Nipigon (J154) (Bangor class)
- HMCS Noranda (J265) (Bangor class)
- HMCS Outarde (J161) (Bangor class)
- HMCS Port Hope (J280) (Bangor class)
- HMCS Quatsino (J152) (Bangor class)
- HMCS Quinte (J166) (Bangor class)
- HMCS Red Deer (J255) (Bangor class)
- HMCS Sarnia (J309) (Bangor class)
- HMCS Stratford (J310) (Bangor class)
- HMCS Swift Current (J254) (Bangor class)
- HMCS Thunder (J156) (Bangor class)
- HMCS Transcona (J271) (Bangor class)
- HMCS Trois-Rivières (J269) (Bangor class)
- HMCS Truro (J268) (Bangor class)
- HMCS Ungava (J149) (Bangor class)
- HMCS Vegreville (J257) (Bangor class)
- HMCS Wasaga (J162) (Bangor class)
- HMCS Westmount (J318) (Bangor class)
- HMCS Comox (J64) (Fundy class)
- HMCS Fundy (J88) (Fundy class)
- HMCS Gaspe (J94) (Fundy class)
- HMCS Nanoose (J35) (Fundy class)
- HMCS Alder Lake (J480) (Lake class)
- HMCS Ash Lake (J481) (Lake class)
- HMCS Beech Lake (J482) (Lake class)
- HMCS Birch Lake (J483) (Lake class)
- HMCS Cedar Lake (J484) (Lake class)
- HMCS Cherry Lake (J485) (Lake class)
- HMCS Fir Lake (J486) (Lake class)
- HMCS Hickory Lake (J487) (Lake class)
- HMCS Larch Lake (J488) (Lake class)
- HMCS Maple Lake (J489) (Lake class)
- HMCS Oak Lake (J490) (Lake class)
- HMCS Pine Lake (J491) (Lake class)
- HMCS Poplar Lake (J492) (Lake class)
- HMCS Spruce Lake (J493) (Lake class)
- HMCS Willow Lake (J495) (Lake class)
- HMCS Coquitlam (J364) (Llewellyn class)
- HMCS Cranbrook (J372) (Llewellyn class)
- HMCS Daerwood (J357) (Llewellyn class)
- HMCS Kalamalka (J395) (Llewellyn class)
- HMCS Lavallee (J371) (Llewellyn class)
- HMCS Llewellyn (J278) (Llewellyn class)
- HMCS Lloyd George (J279) (Llewellyn class)
- HMCS Revelstoke (J373) (Llewellyn class)
- HMCS Rossland (J358) (Llewellyn class)
- HMCS St. Joseph (J359) (Llewellyn class)

=== Motor launches ===
- HMC ML Q050 (Fairmile B Type A)
- HMC ML Q051
- HMC ML Q052 (loaned to FFN)
- HMC ML Q053
- HMC ML Q054
- HMC ML Q055
- HMC ML Q056
- HMC ML Q057
- HMC ML Q058
- HMC ML Q059
- HMC ML Q060
- HMC ML Q061
- HMC ML Q062 (loaned to FFN)
- HMC ML Q063 (loaned to FFN)
- HMC ML Q064
- HMC ML Q065
- HMC ML Q066
- HMC ML Q067
- HMC ML Q068
- HMC ML Q069
- HMC ML Q070
- HMC ML Q071
- HMC ML Q072
- HMC ML Q073
- HMC ML Q074
- HMC ML Q075
- HMC ML Q076
- HMC ML Q077
- HMC ML Q078
- HMC ML Q079
- HMC ML Q080
- HMC ML Q081
- HMC ML Q082
- HMC ML Q083
- HMC ML Q084
- HMC ML Q085
- HMC ML Q086
- HMC ML Q087
- HMC ML Q088
- HMC ML Q089
- HMC ML Q090
- HMC ML Q091
- HMC ML Q092
- HMC ML Q093
- HMC ML Q094
- HMC ML Q095
- HMC ML Q096
- HMC ML Q097
- HMC ML Q098
- HMC ML Q099
- HMC ML Q100
- HMC ML Q101
- HMC ML Q102
- HMC ML Q103
- HMC ML Q104
- HMC ML Q105
- HMC ML Q106
- HMC ML Q107
- HMC ML Q108
- HMC ML Q109
- HMC ML Q110
- HMC ML Q111
- HMC ML Q112 (Fairmile B Type B)
- HMC ML Q113
- HMC ML Q114
- HMC ML Q115
- HMC ML Q116
- HMC ML Q117
- HMC ML Q118
- HMC ML Q119
- HMC ML Q120
- HMC ML Q121
- HMC ML Q122
- HMC ML Q124
- HMC ML Q125
- HMC ML Q126
- HMC ML Q127
- HMC ML Q128
- HMC ML Q129

*(Canadian Fairmiles were not commissioned. They were not named, until sold off, or assigned as tenders to various bases post-war. Ships loaned to Free French Navy (FFN) served under Canadian command.)

=== Motor Torpedo Boats ===
- HMCS CMTB-1
- "S-03" (ex USN PT-3)
- "S-04" (ex USN PT-4)
- "S-05" (ex USN PT-5)
- "S-06" (ex USN PT-6)
- "S-07" (ex USN PT-7)
- HMCS S-09 (ex USN PT-9)
- MTB 459 (G type)
- MTB 460 (G type)
- MTB 461 (G type)
- MTB 462 (G type)
- MTB 463 (G type)
- MTB 464 (G type)
- MTB 465 (G type)
- MTB 466 (G type)
- MTB 485 (G type)
- MTB 486 (G type)
- MTB 491 (G type)
- MTB 726 (Fairmile D type)
- MTB 727 (Fairmile D type)
- MTB 735 (Fairmile D type)
- MTB 736 (Fairmile D type)
- MTB 737 (Fairmile D type)
- MTB 743 (Fairmile D type)
- MTB 744 (Fairmile D type)
- MTB 745 (Fairmile D type)
- MTB 746 (Fairmile D type)
- MTB 747 (Fairmile D type)
- MTB 748 (Fairmile D type)
- MTB 797 (Fairmile D type)

=== Armed trawlers ===
- HMCS Anticosti (T274) (Isles class)
- HMCS Baffin (T275) (Isles class)
- HMCS Cailiff (T276) (Isles class)
- HMCS Ironbound (T284) (Isles class)
- HMCS Liscomb (T285) (Isles class)
- HMCS Magdalen (T279) (Isles class)
- HMCS Manitoulin (T280) (Isles class)
- HMCS Miscou (T277) (Isles class)

=== Armed yachts ===
- HMCS Ambler (Q11/Z32)
- HMCS Beaver (S10/Z10) (ex-Aztec)
- HMCS Caribou (S12) (ex-Elfreda)
- HMCS Culver
- HMCS Cougar (Z15) (ex-USS Sabalo)
- HMCS Elk (S05) (ex-Arcadia)
- HMCS Grizzly (Z14)
- HMCS Husky (S06)
- HMCS Lynx (Z07)
- HMCS Moose (Z14)
- HMCS Otter
- HMCS Raccoon (S14), (ex-Halonia)
- HMCS Reindeer (S08) (ex-Mascotte)
- HMCS Renard (S13) (ex-Winchester (II))
- HMCS Sans Peur (Z02)
- HMCS Vison (S11)
- HMCS Wolf (Z16)

=== Landing craft ===
- LCI (L) 115
- LCI (L) 117
- LCI (L) 118
- LCI (L) 121
- LCI (L) 125
- LCI (L) 135
- LCI (L) 166
- LCI (L) 177
- LCI (L) 249
- LCI (L) 250
- LCI (L) 252
- LCI (L) 255
- LCI (L) 260
- LCI (L) 262
- LCI (L) 263
- LCI (L) 264
- LCI (L) 266
- LCI (L) 270
- LCI (L) 271
- LCI (L) 276
- LCI (L) 277
- LCI (L) 285
- LCI (L) 288
- LCI (L) 295
- LCI (L) 298
- LCI (L) 299
- LCI (L) 301
- LCI (L) 302
- LCI (L) 305
- LCI (L) 306
- LCI (L) 310
- LCI (L) 311
- LCA 736
- LCA 850
- LCA 856
- LCA 925
- LCA 1021
- LCA 1033
- LCA 1057
- LCA 1059
- LCA 1137
- LCA 1138
- LCA 1150
- LCA 1151
- LCA 1371
- LCA 1372
- LCA 1374
- LCA 1375

== Submarines ==
- HMCS U 190 (surrendered and recommissioned U-boat)
- HMCS U 889 (surrendered and recommissioned U-boat)

== Auxiliaries ==
(The symbol FY in the pennant number denotes fishing vessels of the Fisherman's Reserve which constituted a large portion of the auxiliary fleet throughout the Second World War.)

=== Accommodation vessels ===
- HMCS Avalon II
- HMCS Givenchy II
- HMCS Venture II

=== Anti-submarine target towing vessels ===
- CNAV Atwood (Z 47)
- CNAV Brentwood (Z 48)
- CNAV Eastwood (Z 49)
- CNAV Greenwood (Z 50)
- CNAV Inglewood (Z 51)
- CNAV Kirkwood (Z 53)
- CNAV Lakewood (Z 63)
- CNAV Oakwood (Z 64)
- CNAV Wildwood (Z 65)

How many total?

=== Cable layers ===
- HMCS Cyrus Field

=== Coil skids ===
- C.S. 8
- C.S. 10
- C.S. 13
- C.S. 14
- C.S. 15
- C.S. 16
- C.S. 17
- C.S. 18

=== Diving vessels ===
- Diving Tender No 2
- Diving Tender No 3
- Diving Tender No 4
- Diving Tender No 5
- Diving Tender No 6

=== Examination vessels ===
- HMCS Andrée Dupré (Z03/W03)
- HMCS Armentières
- HMCS Citadelle
- HMCS French (S01/Z23)
- HMCS Fleur de Lis (Z31/J16)
- HMCS Laurier (S09/Z34)
- HMCS Macsin (W07/Z38)
- HMCS Marvita (Z44)
- HMCS Mont Joli (Fy 93/Z02/Z24)
- HMCS Murray Stewart (Z19/J19)
- HMCS Shulamite (Z39)
- HMCS Ulna
- HMCS Zoarces (Fy 62/Z36)

=== Gate vessels ===
- GV 1 (ex-HMCS Ypres)
- GV 2
- GV 3
- GV 4
- GV 5
- GV 6
- GV 7
- GV 8
- GV 9
- GV 10
- GV 11
- GV 12 (ex-HMCS St. Eloi)
- GV 13
- GV 14 (ex-HMCS Loos)
- GV 15 (ex-HMCS Arras)
- GV 16 (ex-HMCS Arleux)
- GV 17 (|ex-HMCS Festubert)
- GV 18
- GV 19
- GV 20 (ex-CD 101)
- GV 21
- GV 22
- GV 23
- GV 24

=== Harbour craft ===
- HC 1 (Gay Rover)
- HC 2
- HC 3
- HC 4
- HC 5
- HC 6
- HC 7
- HC 8
- HC 9
- HC 10
- HC 11
- HC 12
- HC 13
- HC 14
- HC 15
- HC 16
- HC 17
- HC 18
- HC 19
- HC 20
- HC 21
- HC 22
- HC 23
- HC 24
- HC 25
- HC 26 (ex-Active II)
- HC 27 (ex-Advance)
- HC 28 (ex-Aqcharaz)
- HC 29 (ex-Arrow)
- HC 30 (ex-Alberta III)
- HC 31 (ex-Zig Zag, ex-HMCS Avalon III)
- HC 32 (ex-Rustic I)
- HC 33 (ex-HMCS Attendant)
- HC 34 (ex-HMCS Attentive)
- HC 35
- HC 36 (ex-HMCS Burma)
- HC 37 (ex-HMCS Captor I)
- HC 38 (ex-HMCS Castor)
- HC 39 (ex-Clair L)
- HC 40 (I) (ex-Doris May)
- HC 40 (II) (ex-HMCS Invader)
- HC 41 (ex-Edith 1)
- HC 42 (Ednorina)
- HC 43 (ex-Ellsworth)
- HC 44 (ex-Emoh)
- HC 45 (ex-Nancy Lee)
- HC 46 (ex-Fernand Rinfret)
- HC 47 (ex-Guardian)
- HC 48 (ex-Gulf Ranger I)
- HC 49 (ex-HMCS Hochelaga II)
- HC 50 (ex-Invader)
- HC 51 (ex-Islander)
- HC 52 (ex-Jack L. Ingalls)
- HC 53 (ex-HMCS Jalobert)
- HC 54
- HC 55 (ex-Jessie May)
- HC 56 (Langholm)
- HC 57
- HC 58 (ex-Lila G)
- HC 59 (ex-Lorraine)
- HC 60 (ex-Marlis)
- HC 61 (ex-Marmat)
- HC 62 (ex-Matapan)
- HC 63 (ex-HMCS Protector)
- HC 64 (ex-Raficer)
- HC 65 (ex-Saker II)
- HC 66
- HC 67 (ex-Marie Therese)
- HC 68
- HC 69 (ex-Wild Duck I)
- HC 70 (ex-"ML 007")
- HC 71
- HC 72
- HC 73 (ex-"ML 010")
- HC 74
- HC 75 (ex-"ML 013", ex-HMCS Lynx))
- HC 76
- HC 77
- HC 78 (ex-Miss Gray)
- HC 79 (ex-Miss Kelvin)
- HC 80 (ex-Moby Dick I)
- HC 82
- HC 83
- HC 84
- HC 85 (ex-Nancy C)
- HC 86 (ex-Nepsya)
- HC 87 (ex-New America)
- HC 88 (Newbrunswicker)
- HC 89 (ex-Laval)
- HC 90 (ex-Papoose)
- HC 91
- HC 92 (ex-Rio Casma)
- HC 93 (ex-R.J. Foote)
- HC 94 (ex-Rosemary)
- HC 95 (ex-Saltpetre)
- HC 96 (ex-Saravan)
- HC 97 (ex-Shirley Mae)
- HC 98 (ex-Soma I)
- HC 99 (ex-Spartan III)
- HC 100 (ex-Sidney River)
- HC 101 (ex-Tantramar)
- HC 102 (ex-HMCS Tuna II)
- HC 103 (ex-Valinda)
- HC 104 (ex-HMCS Vigil II)
- HC 105 (ex-Wild Duck II)
- HC 106 (ex-Wings)
- HC 107 (ex-Workboy)
- HC 108
- HC 109
- HC 110 (ex-Queen Bee I)
- HC 113
- HC 115
- HC 116
- HC 117
- HC 118
- HC 119
- HC 120
- HC 122
- HC 121 (ex-Lady Beth II)
- HC 123 (ex-Tao Tog)
- HC 124 (ex-Yorkholme)
- HC 125 (Universe Z125)
- HC 126
- HC 127 (ex-Skimmer II)
- HC 128 (ex-Bytown
- HC 129 (ex-Susan S)
- HC 130 (ex-Fahe)
- HC 131
- HC 132
- HC 133 (ex-Montcalm)
- HC 134 (ex-Fortuna)
- HC 135 (Veraine)
- HC 136 (ex-Ditchburn)
- HC 137 (ex-Venning)
- HC 138 (ex-Viking)
- HC 139 (ex-Rainbow II)
- HC 140
- HC 141
- HC 142 (ex-HMCS Blarney II)
- HC 143 (ex-HMCS Gertrude)
- HC 144 (ex-HMCS Hornet)
- HC 145 (ex-HMCS Uno)
- HC 146
- HC 147 (ex-Dorcas II)
- HC 148
- HC 149
- HC 151
- HC 152
- HC 153
- HC 154
- HC 155
- HC 156
- HC 157 (ex-HC 81)
- HC 158 (ex-Dolphin II III)
- HC 159 (ex-Mush)
- HC 160 (ex-Mary Goreham)
- HC 161
- HC 162
- HC 163
- HC 164
- HC 165 (ex-Pal-O-Mine II)
- HC 166
- HC 167
- HC 168
- HC 169
- HC 170 (ex-Mush)
- HC 171 (ex-Skimmer III)
- HC 173
- HC 175
- HC 176
- HC 177
- HC 178
- HC 180 (ex-RCMP D-10)
- HC 181
- HC 182
- HC 183
- HC 184
- HC 185
- HC 186
- HC 187
- HC 188
- HC 189
- HC 190 (ex -HMCS Venture)
- HC 191 (ex-Autumn Leaf)
- HC 192
- HC 193
- HC 194
- HC 195
- HC 196
- HC 197
- HC 198
- HC 199
- HC 200
- HC 201 (ex-Yendys)
- HC 202 (ex-Mudathalapadu)
- HC 203
- HC 204
- HC 205
- HC 206
- HC 207 (ex-Paragon II I)
- HC 208
- HC 209
- HC 210
- HC 211
- HC 212
- HC 213
- HC 214
- HC 215
- HC 217
- HC 218 (ex-Retlas)
- HC 219
- HC 220
- HC 221
- HC 223 (ex-Sea Bird II)
- HC 224
- HC 225
- HC 230
- HC 231
- HC 232
- HC 233
- HC 234
- HC 235
- HC 236
- HC 237
- HC 238
- HC 239
- HC 240
- HC 241
- HC 242
- HC 243
- HC 244
- HC 245
- HC 246
- HC 247
- HC 248
- HC 249
- HC 250
- HC 251
- HC 252
- HC 253
- HC 254
- HC 255
- HC 256
- HC 257
- HC 258
- HC 259
- HC 260
- HC 261
- HC 262
- HC 263
- HC 264
- HC 265
- HC 266
- HC 267
- HC 268
- HC 269
- HC 270
- HC 272
- HC 273
- HC 274
- HC 275
- HC 276
- HC 277
- HC 278
- HC 279
- HC 280
- HC 281
- HC 282
- HC 284
- HC 285
- HC 286
- HC 287
- HC 288
- HC 289
- HC 290
- HC 291
- HC 292
- HC 293
- HC 294
- HC 295
- HC 296
- HC 297
- HC 298 (Weetiebud)
- HC 299
- HC 300 (ex-Lipari)
- HC 301
- HC 303
- HC 304
- HC 305
- HC 306
- HC 307
- HC 309
- HC 310
- HC 311
- HC 312
- HC 313
- HC 314
- HC 315
- HC 316
- HC 319
- HC 320
- HC 322 (Fy 47, Sea Wave)
- HC 323
- HC 325
- HC 326
- HC 327
- HC 328 (Fy 41, ex-Bluenose)
- HC 329
- HC 330
- HC 331
- HC 332
- HC 333
- HC 334
- HC 335
- HC 336
- HC 337
- HC 338
- HC 339 (Fy 45, ex-Sea Flash)
- HC 340 (ex-HMCS Bluenose)
- HC 342
- HC 343
- HC 344
- HC 345 (ex-Go Getter)
- HC 346
- HC 347
- HC 349
- HC 350
- HC 351
- HPC 1
- HPC 2
- HPC 3
- HPC 4
- HPC 5
- HPC 6
- HPC 7
- HPC 8
- HPC 9
- HPC 10
- HPC 11
- HPC 12
- HPC 14
- HPC 15
- HPC 16
- HPC 17
- HPS 18 (Imperator Z18)
- HPC 19
- HPC 20
- HPC 21 (ex-Lucinda II)
- HPC 22 (ex-Kwabeeta)
- HPC 23
- HPC 24
- HPC 25
- HPC 26
- HPC 27
- HPC 28
- HPC 29
- HPC 30
- HPC 31
- HPC 33
- HPC 34
- HPC 35
- HPC 36
- HPC 37
- HPC 38
- HPC 39
- HPC 40
- HPC 41

=== Hospital ships ===
- HMCS Letitia (ex-HMS Letitia)

=== Mine laying vessels ===
- HMCS Sankaty
- HMCS Whitethroat (M03/M53)

=== Minesweeper auxiliaries ===
- HMCS Bras d'Or (TR 18/J06)
- HMCS Cape Beale (Fy 26)
- HMCS Joan W. II (Fy 34)
- HMCS Mitchell Bay (Fy 05)
- HMCS Rayon d'Or (J13/J11/Z11)
- HMCS Reo II (Z33/J08)
- HMCS Signal (Fy 30)
- HMCS Star XVI (Z16/J00)
- HMCS Suderoy I
- HMCS Suderoy II
- HMCS Suderoy IV (J03)
- HMCS Suderoy V (J04)
- HMCS Suderoy VI (J05)
- HMCS Takla (Fy 27)
- HMCS Venosta (J11/Z21)
- HMCS Vercheres

=== Mobile deperming craft ===
- HMCS Gryme (Z60)
- HMCS Ross Norman (Z09/J01/J09)

=== Patrol boats ===
- HMCS Acadia
- HMCS Adversus (J17)
- HMCS Alachasse (Z18/J18)
- HMCS Allaverdy (Fy 06)
- HMCS Andamara (Z 22)
- HMCS Anna Mildred (Fy 87/Z12A)
- HMCS Bantie (W 04)
- HMCS Barclay Sound (Fy23)
- HMCS Barmar (Fy 10/Z115)
- Bartlett
- HMCS B.C. Lady (Fy 07, later to RCAF)
- HMCS Billow (Fy 25), ex-(Fy 32)
- HMCS Camenita (Fy 41)
- HMCS Cancolim (Z10)
- HMCS Canfisco (Fy 17)
- HMCS Capella (Fy 31)
- HMCS Chamiss Bay (Fy 39/F50)
- HMCS Cleopatra (Fy 89/Z35)
- HMCS Combat (later to RCAF)
- HMCS Comber (Fy 37) (ex-C.S.C. II)
- HMCS Crest (Fy 38) (ex-May S)
- HMCS Dalehurst (Fy 35) (ex-Glendale V)
- HMCS Departure Bay (Fy 48)
- HMCS Earl Field (Fy 40)
- HMCS Ehkoli (Fy 12)
- HMCS Eileen
- HMCS Fifer (Fy 00/Z30)
- HMCS Interceptor (Z15)
- HMCS Howe Sound I (Fy 19)
- HMCS Johanna (Fy 28)
- HMCS Kuitan (Fy 14)
- HMCS Leola Vivien (Fy 15, also called Leelo)
- HMCS Lil II
- HMCS Louis Herbert (Fy 92/J22)
- HMCS Loyal I (Fy 43)
- HMCS Loyal II (Fy 22/Z25) (ex-Foam)
- HMCS Maraudor (Fy 03)
- HMCS Margaret I (Fy 29)
- HMCS Meander (Z04)
- HMCS Merry Chase (Fy 46)
- HMCS Moolock (Fy 16)
- HMCS Moresby III (Fy 42)
- HMCS Nenamook (Fy 13)
- HMCS Norsal (P12/Z12)
- HMCS San Tomas (Fy 02)
- HMCS Santa Maria (Fy 08)
- HMCS Smith Sound (Fy 18)
- HMCS Snow Prince (later to RCAF)
- HMCS Spray (Fy 33/Z09) (ex-'Hatta VII')
- HMCS Springtime V (Fy 09)
- HMCS Starling (II)
- HMCS Surf (Fy 24) (ex-Arashio)
- HMCS Talapus (Fy 11)
- HMCS Tordo| (Fy 20)
- HMCS Valdes (Fy 21)
- HMCS Vanisle (Fy 01)
- HMCS Vencedor (Z21)
- HMCS West Coast (Fy 04)
- HMCS Western Maid (Fy 36)

=== Survey vessels ===
- HMCS Cedarwood (AGSC 539)

=== Support ships ===
- HMCS Dundalk (Z40)
- HMCS Dundurn (Z41)
- HMCS Eastore (Z56)
- HMCS Laymore (Z57)
- HMCS Mastodon
- HMCS Moonbeam (Z43/J43)
- HMCS Preserver (F94)
- HMCS Provider (F100)
- HMCS Stonechat
- HMCS Sunbeam (Z42)
- HMCS Transriver
- HMCS Westore

=== Tenders ===
- HMCS Chief Seagay
- HMCS Chief Tapeet
- HMCS "Crusader"

=== Training vessels ===
- HMCS Attaboy
- HMCS Cairn
- HMCS Donnaconna II
- HMCS Milicette
- HMCS Oriole
- HMCS Pathfinder
- HMCS Scatari
- HMCS Shirl
- HMCS Skidegate
- HMCS St. Clair
- HMCS Venetia
- HMCS Venture (later HC 190)

=== Tugboats ===
- HMCS Glenada (W30) (Glen class)
- HMCS Glenbrook (W64/YTB 501) (Glen class)
- HMCS Glenclova (Glen class)
- HMCS Glencove (W37) (Glen class)
- HMCS Glendevon (W38/YTB 505) (Glen class)
- HMCS Glendon (W39/YTB 506) (Glen class)
- HMCS Glendower (W24) (Glen class)
- HMCS Glendyne (W68/YTM 503) (Glen class)
- HMCS Gleneagle (W40) (Glen class)
- HMCS Glenella (W41) (Glen class)
- HMCS Glen Evis (W65/YTB 502) (Glen class)
- HMCS Glenfield (W42) (Glen class)
- HMCS Glenholme (W28) (Glen class)
- HMCS Glenkeen (W67) (Glen class)
- HMCS Glen Lea (W25) (Glen class)
- HMCS Glenlivet (W43/YTB 504) (Glen class)
- HMCS Glenmont (W27) (Glen class)
- HMCS Glenora (W26) (Glen class)
- HMCS Glenside (W63/YTB 500) (Glen class)
- HMCS Glenvalley (W44) (Glen class)
- HMCS Glenwood (W45) (Glen class)
- HMCS Alberton (W48) (Norton class)
- HMCS Beaverton (W23) (Norton class)
- HMCS Birchton (W35) (Norton class)
- HMCS Clifton (W36/ATA 529) (Norton class)
- HMCS Heatherton (W22/ATA 527) (Norton class)
- HMCS Maxwellton (W46) (Norton class)
- HMCS Norton (W31) (Norton class)
- HMCS Riverton (W47/ATA 528) (Norton class)
- Adamsville (YTS 582) (Ville class)
- Auburnville (W50) (Ville class)
- Barkerville (Ville class)
- Beamsville (YTS 583) (Ville class)
- Blissville (W56) (Ville class)
- Bonnyville (Ville class)
- Coalville (YTS 576) (Ville class)
- Eckville (W58/YTS 580) (Ville class)
- Grenville (W20) (Ville class)
- HMCS Haysville (W18) (Ville class)
- Hartville (Ville class)
- Hodgeville (W53) (Ville class)
- Innisville (Ville class)
- Jamesville (Ville class)
- Johnville (Ville class)
- Kayville (Ville class)
- Kingsville (W19) (Ville class)
- Lakeville (W21) (Ville class)
- Lawrenceville (YTS 584) (Ville class)
- Listerville (YTS 578) (Ville class)
- Loganville (YTS 589) (Ville class)
- Luceville (Ville class)
- Mannville (W57/YTS 577) (Ville class)
- Martinville (W61) (Ville class)
- Marysville (YTS 585) (Ville class)
- Merrickville (Ville class)
- Neville (Ville class)
- Otterville (W32/YTS 590) (Ville class)
- Parksville (W49/YTS 579) (Ville class)
- Pierreville (Ville class)
- HMCS Plainsville (W01/YTS 587) (Ville class)
- Queensville (YTS 586) (Ville class)
- Radville (W52) (Ville class)
- Roseville (Ville class)
- Streetsville (W55) (Ville class)
- Shawville (Ville class)
- Youville (YTS 588) (Ville class)
- FT 1 (Fire tug)
- FT 2 (Fire tug)
- FT 3 (Fire tug)
- HMCS Bally (Fy 88)
- HMCS Bersimis
- Brighton (W35)
- HMCS D.W. Murray
- HMCS J.A.Cornett
- HMCS Frank Dixon
- HMCS Haro
- HMCS Helena
- HMCS Helen S
- HMCS Lisgar
- HMCS North Lake
- HMCS North Shore
- HMCS North Star
- HMCS Northwind
- HMCS Ocean Eagle (Fy 71/J07)
- HMCS Patricia McQueen
- HMCS Pugwash (W01)
- HMCS Ripple II (Fy)
- HMCS Stanpoint

=== W/T Calibration vessels ===
- HMCS Aristocrat (Z46)
- HMCS Seretha II (Fy 45/Z45)

=== Other ===
- HMCS Kipawo (BMV)
- HMCS Standard Coaster (Z17/J10) (CS Tow)
- HMCS Anashene
- HMCS Andrew Lee
- HMCS Andy (II)
- HMCS Chaleur (Z20)
- HMCS Cartier (ex-HMCS Charny)
- HMCS Lady Rodney (Fy 46/F40)
- HMCS Macdonald (P07/Z07)
- HMCS Madawaska
- HMCS Magedoma
- HMCS Nitinat (P03/Z03)
- HMCS S.O. 9
- HMCS Seiner (Fy 32)
- HMCS Venture II
- HMCS Viernoe (J12)

== Depot ships ==
Depot ships, also known as stone frigates or accommodation ships, are those navy shore establishments that are by tradition allocated ship names. In some instances the name for an establishment located at a harbour is derived from an actual ship stationed permanently in that harbour.

- HMCS Avalon
- HMCS Brunswicker
- HMCS Burrard
- HMCS Bytown
- HMCS Bytown II
- HMCS Captor
- HMCS Carleton
- HMCS Cartier
- HMCS Cataraqui
- HMCS Chaleur
- HMCS Chatham
- HMCS Chippawa
- HMCS Cornwallis
- HMCS Discovery
- HMCS Donnacona
- HMCS Fort Ramsay
- HMCS Givenchy
- HMCS Griffon
- HMCS Haligonian
- HMCS Hochelaga
- HMCS Hunter
- HMCS Kings
- HMCS Malahat
- HMCS Montcalm
- HMCS Naden
- HMCS Niobe
- HMCS Nonsuch
- HMCS Peregrine
- HMCS Prevost
- HMCS Protector
- HMCS Queen
- HMCS Queen Charlotte
- HMCS Royal Roads
- HMCS St. Hyacinthe
- HMCS Scotian
- HMCS Shelburne
- HMCS Somers Isles
- HMCS Stadacona
- HMCS Star
- HMCS Tecumseh
- HMCS Unicorn
- HMCS Venture
- HMCS York

== See also ==
- Royal Canadian Navy
- Origins of the Royal Canadian Navy
- History of the Royal Canadian Navy
- List of ships of the Royal Canadian Navy
- Hull classification symbol (Canada)
- His Majesty's Canadian Ship
- List of aircraft of the Royal Canadian Navy
- List of Royal Canadian Navy ships of the First World War
- List of Royal Canadian Navy ships of the Cold War

== Bibliography and further reading ==
- Blatherwick, F.J. (1992). Royal Canadian Navy honours, decorations, medals, 1910–1968. FJB Air Publications, New Westminster.
- The Canadian Navy List 1914 to 1945. King's Printer, Ottawa.
- Colledge, J. J.; Warlow, Ben (2006) [1969]. Ships of the Royal Navy: The Complete Record of All Fighting Ships of the Royal Navy from the 15th Century to the Present (3rd Rev ed.). London: Chatham Publishing. ISBN 978-1-86176-281-8. OCLC 67375475.
- Dittmar, F.J.; College, J.J. (1972). British Warships, 1914–1919. Alan, London.
- Douglas, W.A.B.; et al. (2004). No Higher Purpose: The Official Operational History of the Royal Canadian Navy in the Second World War, 1939–1943. Volume II, Part I. Vanwell, St. Catharines.
- Douglas, W.A.B.; et al. (2007). A Blue Water Navy: The Official Operational History of the Royal Canadian Navy in the Second World War – 1943–1945, Volume II, Part 2. Vanwell, St. Catharines.
- Gimblett, Richard H., ed. (2009). The Naval Service of Canada 1910–2010: The Centennial Story. Toronto: Dundurn Press. ISBN 978-1-4597-1322-2.
- Gimblett, Richard H.; Hadley, Michael L., eds. (2010). Citizen Sailors: Chronicles of Canada's Naval Reserve. Toronto: Dundurn Press. ISBN 978-1-55488-867-2.
- Johnston, William; Rawling, William G.P.; Gimblett, Richard H.; MacFarlane, John (2010). The Seabound Coast: The Official History of the Royal Canadian Navy, 1867–1939. Vol. 1. Toronto: Dundurn Press. ISBN 978-1-55488-908-2.
- Macpherson, Ken; Barrie, Ron (2002). The Ships of Canada's Naval Forces 1910–2002 (Third ed.). St. Catharines, Ontario: Vanwell Publishing. ISBN 1-55125-072-1.
- Milner, Marc (2010). Canada's Navy: The First Century (Second ed.). Toronto: University of Toronto Press. ISBN 978-0-8020-9604-3.
- Office of Naval Intelligence (1944). Index to Warships of the British Commonwealth (PDF). US Government Printing Office.
- Tucker, Gilbert (1952). The Naval Service of Canada : Its Official History Vol 2, Activities on Shore During the Second World War. King's Printer, Ottawa.
