= HMCS Giffard =

Several units of the Royal Canadian Navy have been named HMCS Giffard.

- HMCS Giffard (K538), a River-class frigate renamed Toronto before commissioning. The ship served in the Battle of the Atlantic during the Second World War.
- HMCS Giffard (K402), a Flower-class corvette that served in the Battle of the Atlantic during the Second World War.

== Battle honours ==
- Atlantic, 1944
