= Z14 =

Z14 may refer to:

- German destroyer Z14 Friedrich Ihn, a Second World War German destroyer
- HMCS Grizzly (Z14) and HMCS Moose (Z14), two armed yachts of the Canadian Navy
- IBM z14 (microprocessor), a microprocessor chip used in mainframe computers.
- Oshiage Station (Station code Z-14), a train station in Sumida, Tokyo, Japan
