= HMCS Reo II =

1931 Royal Canadian Navy minesweeper

History

Canada
- Name: Reo II
- Builder: Meteghan
- Launched: 1931
- Acquired: 30 July 1940
- Commissioned: 23 January 1941
- Decommissioned: 19 October 1945
- Identification: Official Number 152499
- Fate: Sold 1946 Scuttled 24 February 1985

General characteristics in Canadian naval service
- Class & type: Auxiliary minesweeper
- Displacement: 129 t (127 long tons)
- Length: 96 ft 1 in (29.29 m)
- Beam: 17 ft 5 in (5.31 m)
- Draught: 7 ft 5 in (2.26 m)
- Speed: 9 knots (17 km/h; 10 mph)
- Complement: 36

HMCS Reo II was a former rum-running vessel turned military vessel from Meteghan, Nova Scotia. Built in 1931, the ship was used for rum running for five years until Prohibition ended, and was turned into a coastal freighter. She was commissioned during World War II by the Royal Canadian Navy as an auxiliary minesweeper. Declared surplus by the navy in 1945, she was sold to private interests in 1946. Reo II ended up in Lunenburg, Nova Scotia under the care of the Lunenburg Marine Museum Society. In 1984 Reo II was deemed unfit for repair, and was scuttled off Halifax, Nova Scotia in 1985.

== Design and construction ==
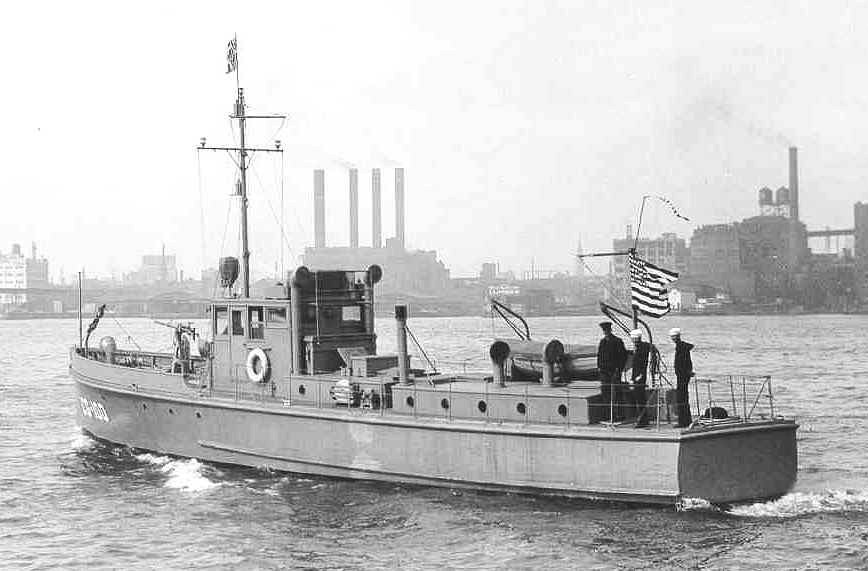
CG-100, a typical patrol boat used during Prohibition

Reo II was designed specifically with rum running in mind. The ship was built with a low silhouette and was painted grey in order to avoid detection from the United States Coast Guard and Canadian coastal patrols. The ship was built in Meteghan, Nova Scotia, the vessel was completed in 1931. In Canadian naval service, the ship was measured at 96 feet 1 inch (29.29 m) long, with a beam of 17 ft 5 in (5.31 m) and a draught of 7 ft 5 in (2.26 m), had a displacement of 129 tonnes (127 long tons) and a maximum speed of 9 knots (17 km/h; 10 mph). In Canadian naval service, the ship had a complement of four officers and 32 ratings.

== Service history ==
=== Rum running ===
During Prohibition, Reo II was used for five years as a supply vessel for illegal liquor and spirits, also known as rum-running. Under direction of its captain, Aubrey Backman, the ship made countless trips along the North Atlantic Coast. The usual trip saw Reo II leave Nova Scotia for St. Pierre, where she would load up on goods. She then travelled down the United States to various drop off points, and returned to Nova Scotia. Reo II often visited other ports in Nova Scotia, such as Halifax and Lunenburg. After Prohibition ended, Reo II was used as a coastal freighter.

=== War ===
Reo II was chartered by the Royal Canadian Navy on 30 July 1940, but was not commissioned until 23 January 1941. Reo II served the navy mainly as an auxiliary minesweeper at Shelburne, Nova Scotia, but also as an examination vessel and coil skid towing vessel. She ended her naval duties on 19 October 1945, when she was declared surplus and paid off. The ship was then sold in 1946.

=== Post war ===
In 1970, Reo II was purchased by the Lunenburg Marine Museum Society, who placed her on display at the Fisheries Museum of the Atlantic in Lunenburg. She remained there until 1984, when marine architects determined that the boat was not fit for repair. Reo II was taken from her mooring at the museum on 24 February 1985, and was towed out to sea roughly 35 miles (56 km) northeast of Halifax where the ship was scuttled at an explosive dumping ground. The wheelhouse was kept as a static monument on the dock outside the Lunenburg Marine Museum.

== See also ==
- Fleet of the Royal Canadian Navy
- Prohibition in Canada
- Prohibition in the United States
