= HMCS Runnymede =

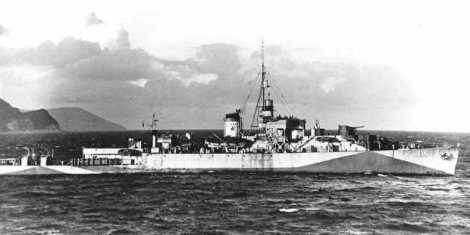
- HMCS Runnymede

History

Canada
- Name: Runnymede
- Namesake: York, Ontario
- Operator: Royal Canadian Navy
- Ordered: June 1942
- Builder: Canadian Vickers, Montreal
- Laid down: 11 September 1943
- Launched: 27 November 1943
- Commissioned: 14 June 1944
- Decommissioned: 19 January 1946
- Identification: pennant number: K 678
- Honours and awards: Atlantic 1944–45
- Fate: Sold 1947, hull expended as breakwater 1948

General characteristics
- Class & type: River-class frigate
- Displacement: 1,445 long tons (1,468 t; 1,618 short tons); 2,110 long tons (2,140 t; 2,360 short tons) (deep load)
- Length: 283 ft (86.26 m) p/p; 301.25 ft (91.82 m)o/a
- Beam: 36.5 ft (11.13 m)
- Draught: 9 ft (2.74 m); 13 ft (3.96 m) (deep load)
- Propulsion: 2 x Admiralty 3-drum boilers, 2 shafts, reciprocating vertical triple expansion, 5,500 ihp (4,100 kW)
- Speed: 20 knots (37.0 km/h); 20.5 knots (38.0 km/h) (turbine ships)
- Range: 646 long tons (656 t; 724 short tons) oil fuel; 7,500 nautical miles (13,890 km) at 15 knots (27.8 km/h)
- Complement: 157
- Armament: 2 × QF 4 in (102 mm) /45 Mk. XVI on twin mount HA/LA Mk.XIX; 8 × 20 mm QF Oerlikon A/A on twin mounts Mk.V; 1 × Hedgehog 24 spigot A/S projector; up to 150 depth charges

HMCS Runnymede was a River-class frigate that served with the Royal Canadian Navy during the Second World War. She served primarily as a convoy escort in the Battle of the Atlantic. She was named for York, Ontario, however due to possible confusion with HMCS West York, her name reflects a connection with that community.

Prince Rupert was ordered in June 1942 as part of the 1942–1943 River-class building program. She was laid down on 11 September 1943 by Canadian Vickers Ltd. at Montreal, Quebec and launched 27 November later that year. She was commissioned into the Royal Canadian Navy on 14 June 1944 at Montreal.

== Background ==
The River-class frigate was designed by William Reed of Smith's Dock Company of South Bank-on-Tees. Originally called a "twin-screw corvette", its purpose was to improve on the convoy escort classes in service with the Royal Navy at the time, including the Flower-class corvette. The first orders were placed by the Royal Navy in 1940 and the vessels were named for rivers in the United Kingdom, giving name to the class. In Canada they were named for towns and cities though they kept the same designation. The name "frigate" was suggested by Vice-Admiral Percy Nelles of the Royal Canadian Navy and was adopted later that year.

Improvements over the corvette design included improved accommodation which was markedly better. The twin engines gave only three more knots of speed but extended the range of the ship to nearly double that of a corvette at 7,200 nautical miles (13,300 km) at 12 knots. Among other lessons applied to the design was an armament package better designed to combat U-boats including a twin 4-inch mount forward and 12-pounder aft. 15 Canadian frigates were initially fitted with a single 4-inch gun forward but with the exception of HMCS Valleyfield, they were all eventually upgraded to the double mount. For underwater targets, the River-class frigate was equipped with a Hedgehog anti-submarine mortar and depth charge rails aft and four side-mounted throwers.

River-class frigates were the first Royal Canadian Navy warships to carry the 147B Sword horizontal fan echo sonar transmitter in addition to the irregular ASDIC. This allowed the ship to maintain contact with targets even while firing unless a target was struck. Improved radar and direction-finding equipment improved the RCN's ability to find and track enemy submarines over the previous classes.

Canada originally ordered the construction of 33 frigates in October 1941. The design was too big for the shipyards on the Great Lakes so all the frigates built in Canada were built in dockyards along the west coast or along the St. Lawrence River. In all Canada ordered the construction of 60 frigates including ten for the Royal Navy that transferred two to the United States Navy.

== War service ==
After working up at Bermuda, Runnymede was assigned to Mid-Ocean Escort Force escort group C-5. She was used as a trans-Atlantic convoy escort until May 1945 and as Senior Officer's Ship for the group. The group was known as the "Barber Pole Squadron" for the markings on their funnels.

Arriving at Halifax in June 1945 Runnymede was quickly turned around and set off for Esquimalt, British Columbia to undergo a tropicalization refit in preparation for service in the southern Pacific Ocean. This meant installing refrigeration, water-cooling and a change to her camouflage pattern. She commenced the refit in August 1945 at North Vancouver. However, due to the surrender of Japan, the refit was cancelled and Runnymede sailed to Esquimalt where she was placed in reserve and only paid off 19 January 1946.

After the war she was sold to Capital Iron & Metals Ltd. of Victoria, British Columbia for scrapping in 1947. Her hull was stripped and it was expended as a breakwater in Kelsey Bay, British Columbia.
