= Bangor Sawmill Museum =

Museum in Nova Scotia, Canada

The Bangor Sawmill Museum was a historic sawmill located in Meteghan in the Canadian province of Nova Scotia. The first sawmill in the area was erected in 1877, the mill burned down twice and was rebuilt, and sawmill operations closed in the 1980s. The site was subsequently used as a museum from 2001 until the sawmill was destroyed by fire in 2024. The sawmill was among the last functional water-powered turbine lumber sawmills in North America.

The fire which destroyed the sawmill began on the morning of 8 June 2024. The 85 firefighters on scene successfully extinguished the flames, but the structure suffered such extensive damage that what remained was demolished. The RCMP found no evidence of arson, but some locals were skeptical, concluding that "there's no way that the fire could have started by itself". A number of artifacts from the museum were salvaged, however the machinery in the sawmill dating back as far as 1929 was unable to be saved.

The Bangor Development Commission has announced plans to rebuild the museum.
