= HMCS Otter =

Royal Canadian Navy yacht in WWII

History
- Name: Nourmahal; Conseco
- Port of registry: (United States)
- Builder: Robert Jacob Shipyard, City Island, New York
- Launched: 1921
- Fate: Sold to Royal Canadian Navy 1940

Canada
- Name: Otter
- Namesake: otter
- Acquired: 1940
- Commissioned: 4 October 1940
- Fate: Destroyed by fire on 26 March 1941

General characteristics in Canadian service
- Type: Armed yacht
- Displacement: 419 long tons (426 t)
- Length: 160 ft (48.8 m)
- Beam: 25 ft (7.6 m)
- Draught: 10 ft (3.0 m)
- Speed: 11 knots (20 km/h; 13 mph)
- Sensors & processing systems: Asdic
- Armament: 1 × QF 12-pounder 12 cwt naval gun; Depth charges

HMCS Otter was an armed yacht in service with the Royal Canadian Navy during World War II. Launched in 1921, the vessel was constructed as Nourmahal for Vincent Astor of New York as a pleasure yacht. He sold the vessel in the late 1920s and it was renamed Conseco. The Royal Canadian Navy, finding a lack of suitable vessels in Canadian ownership to be taken into naval service, sent Canadian yacht owners south to the United States to find those vessels. Conseco was acquired and brought north to Halifax, Nova Scotia where the vessel was converted to an armed yacht in 1940. Renamed Otter the ship participated in the Battle of the Atlantic, escorting convoys and patrolling the Canadian coast. On 26 March 1941, Otter suffered a catastrophic fire aboard that sank the armed yacht. Two officers and seventeen ratings died in the incident.

== Description ==
In Royal Canadian Navy service as an armed yacht, Otter had a displacement of 419 long tons (426 t) with a length of 160 feet (48.8 m), a beam of 25 feet (7.6 m) and a draught of 10 feet (3.0 m). The armed yacht had a maximum speed of 11 knots (20 km/h; 13 mph) and a complement of 5 officers and 35 ratings. The ship was armed with one QF 12-pounder 12 cwt naval gun. For anti-submarine warfare, Otter was equipped with depth charges and asdic.

== Service history ==
Constructed for Vincent Astor by Robert Jacob Shipyard of City Island, New York as Nourmahal, the vessel was launched in 1921. Later in the 1920s he sold the vessel to John W. Hubbard who used the yacht for coastal cruises. The vessel was renamed Conseco.

To augment the local sea defences of East Coast ports in World War II, the Royal Canadian Navy sought large, steel-hulled yachts to requisition. However, a significant lack of capable vessels were owned by Canadians. Canada turned to its southern neighbour for suitable ships, finding several that met the navy's requirements. However, US neutrality laws prevented their sale to belligerents in the war. In order to circumvent these laws, the Royal Canadian Navy requisitioned the yachts of prominent Canadian yachtsmen and then sent them to the US to purchase the yachts that had been identified by the navy without the US government knowing they were working for the navy. The money to acquire the vessels was provided by the Canadian government through bank loans.

Philip S. Ross, a business executive from Montreal, Quebec was sent to acquire Conseco after his own yacht had been requisitioned. After acquiring the yacht, Ross has his own yacht returned, and Conseco arrived at Halifax, Nova Scotia in late May 1940. After arriving at Halifax, the yacht was renamed Otter and sailed with fellow armed yacht Moose to Quebec City, Quebec to undergo conversion to an armed yacht. Conversion to an armed yacht involved removing most of the luxurious finery and installing naval hardware. Otter required more than just the installation of armament though. The vessel's fresh water tanks were corroded and needed replacing and all the generating machinery was shot and needed replacement.

Otter returned to Halifax after conversion on 2 October 1940 and was commissioned on 4 October. The ship was assigned to the Halifax Local Defence Force, alternating between training duties and anti-submarine patrols. The ship escorted convoys of merchant vessels from Halifax and Sydney, Nova Scotia to the meeting point with the ocean escorts for the transatlantic crossing.

However, wiring issues arose early in Otter's service. The ship suffered a fire while sailing for its conversion, caused by a short circuit. Then, while off Newfoundland Otter had a second fire in a heavy storm. The danger of fire was higher aboard Otter than other warships as the cabins aboard the vessel were constructed of wood, not steel. Then, on 26 March 1941, the ship was ordered to await the arrival of the submarine HMS Talisman off the Sambro Light Vessel. Otter was to escort the submarine into Halifax Harbour. At 0830 while off the lightship, a fire broke out aboard Otter in the engine room. All the engine room personnel on duty died in the fire. The fire spread rapidly to the captain's cabin and the wireless office. The engines failed and with them the electric pumps for the firefighting equipment. To fight the fire, the crew used hand extinguishers and sand, which were inadequate.

The captain ordered the magazine flooded and the code books destroyed. Once that was done, he gave the order to abandon ship. The crew faced 15-foot (4.6 m) waves. In the following evacuation, six members of the crew earned Mentioned in Dispatches for their conduct, including two posthumously. The surviving crew were in the water for two hours before rescue arrived. The Polish-flagged SS Wilsa and HMS Talisman picked up survivors. One lifeboat capsized in the heavy seas while approaching Wilsa, with only three of those onboard rescued. Two officers and seventeen ratings died in the incident.

== Sources ==
- Darlington, Robert A. & McKee, Fraser (1996). The Canadian Naval Chronicle 1939–1945: The Successes and Losses of the Canadian Navy in World War II. St. Catharines, Ontario: Vanwell Publishing. ISBN 1-55125-032-2.
- Macpherson, Ken & Barrie, Ron (2002). The Ships of Canada's Naval Forces 1910–2002 (Third ed.). St. Catharines, Ontario: Vanwell Publishing. ISBN 1-55125-072-1.
- McKee, Fraser (1983). The Armed Yachts of Canada. Erin, Ontario: The Boston Mills Press. ISBN 0-919822-55-X.
- Tucker, Gilbert Norman (1952). The Naval Service of Canada, Its Official History – Volume 2: Activities on Shore During the Second World War. Ottawa: King's Printer. OCLC 4346983.
