= HMS Tamworth Castle =

History

United Kingdom
- Name: Tamworth Castle
- Namesake: Tamworth Castle
- Ordered: 19 January 1943
- Builder: Henry Robb Ltd, Leith
- Laid down: 25 August 1943
- Launched: 26 January 1944
- Identification: Pennant number: K393
- Fate: Transferred to the Royal Canadian Navy

Canada
- Name: Kincardine
- Namesake: Kincardine, Ontario
- Acquired: 1943
- Commissioned: 19 June 1944
- Decommissioned: 27 February 1946
- Identification: Pennant number: K490
- Honours and awards: Atlantic 1944–45
- Fate: Sold for mercantile service 5 September 1946
- Name: Saada
- Port of registry: Casablanca
- In service: 1947
- Out of service: 1953
- Fate: Broken up at La Spezia, Italy in 1953

General characteristics (as built)
- Type: Castle-class corvette
- Displacement: 1,060 long tons (1,077 t)
- Length: 252 ft (77 m)
- Beam: 36 ft 8 in (11.18 m)
- Draught: 13 ft 6 in (4.11 m)
- Installed power: 2 × water-tube boilers; 2,750 ihp (2,050 kW)
- Propulsion: 1 × 4-cylinder triple-expansion steam engine; Single screw
- Speed: 16.5 knots (30.6 km/h; 19.0 mph)
- Range: 6,200 nmi (11,500 km) at 15 kn (28 km/h; 17 mph)
- Complement: 120
- Sensors & processing systems: Type 272 radar; Type 145 sonar; Type 147B sonar
- Armament: 1 × QF 4-inch Mk XIX gun; 1 × Squid anti-submarine mortar; 1 × Depth charge rail, 15 depth charges; 4–10 × 20 mm anti-aircraft cannon

HMS Tamworth Castle was a Castle-class corvette that was ordered for the British Royal Navy during the Second World War. Before completion, the ship was transferred to the Royal Canadian Navy and renamed HMCS Kincardine, which used the corvette as a convoy escort for the rest of the war. Following the war, the ship was sold for mercantile use to French, then Moroccan interests and was renamed Saada in 1947.

== Design and description ==
The Castle class were an improved corvette design over their predecessor Flower class. The Flower class was not considered acceptable for mid-Atlantic sailing and was only used on Atlantic convoy duty out of need. Though the Admiralty would have preferred Loch-class frigates, the inability of many small shipyards to construct the larger ships required them to come up with a smaller vessel. The increased length of the Castle class over their predecessors and their improved hull form gave the Castles better speed and performance on patrol in the North Atlantic and an acceptable replacement for the Flowers. This, coupled with improved anti-submarine armament in the form of the Squid mortar led to a much more capable anti-submarine warfare (ASW) vessel. However, the design did have criticisms, mainly in the way it handled at low speeds and that the class's maximum speed was already slower than the speeds of the new U-boats they would be facing.

A Castle-class corvette was 252 feet (77 m) long with a beam of 36 feet 8 inches (11.18 m) and a draught of 13 feet 6 inches (4.11 m) at deep load. (Note: Brown states the beam at 36.5 feet (11.1 m) and the draught at 13.5 feet (4.1 m)) The ships displaced 1,060 long tons (1,080 t) standard and 1,580 long tons (1,610 t) deep load. (Note: Chesneau states the displacement at deep load as 1,590–1,630 long tons (1,620–1,660 t)) The ships had a complement of 120. (Note: Brown states the complement as 99 and Johnston states the complement of Canadian ships at 112 (7 officers and 105 ratings).)

The ships were powered by two Admiralty three-drum boilers which created 2,750 indicated horsepower (2,050 kW). This powered one vertical triple expansion engine that drove one shaft, giving the ships a maximum speed of 16.5 knots (30.6 km/h; 19.0 mph). The ships carried 480 tons of oil giving them a range of 6,200 nautical miles (11,500 km; 7,100 mi) at 15 knots (28 km/h; 17 mph).

The corvettes were armed with one QF 4-inch Mk XIX gun mounted forward. (Note: Mk XIX = Mark 19. Britain used Roman numerals to denote Marks (models) of ordnance until after World War II. This was the nineteenth model of British QF 4-inch gun) Anti-air armament varied from 4 to 10 Oerlikon 20 mm cannons. For ASW purposes, the ships were equipped with one three-barreled Squid anti-submarine mortar with 81 projectiles. The ships also had two depth charge throwers and one depth charge rail on the stern that came with 15 depth charges.

The ships were equipped with Type 145 and Type 147B ASDIC. The Type 147B was tied to the Squid anti-submarine mortar and would automatically set the depth on the fuses of the projectiles until the moment of firing. A single Squid-launched attack had a success rate of 25%. The class was also provided with HF/DF and Type 277 radar.

== Service history ==
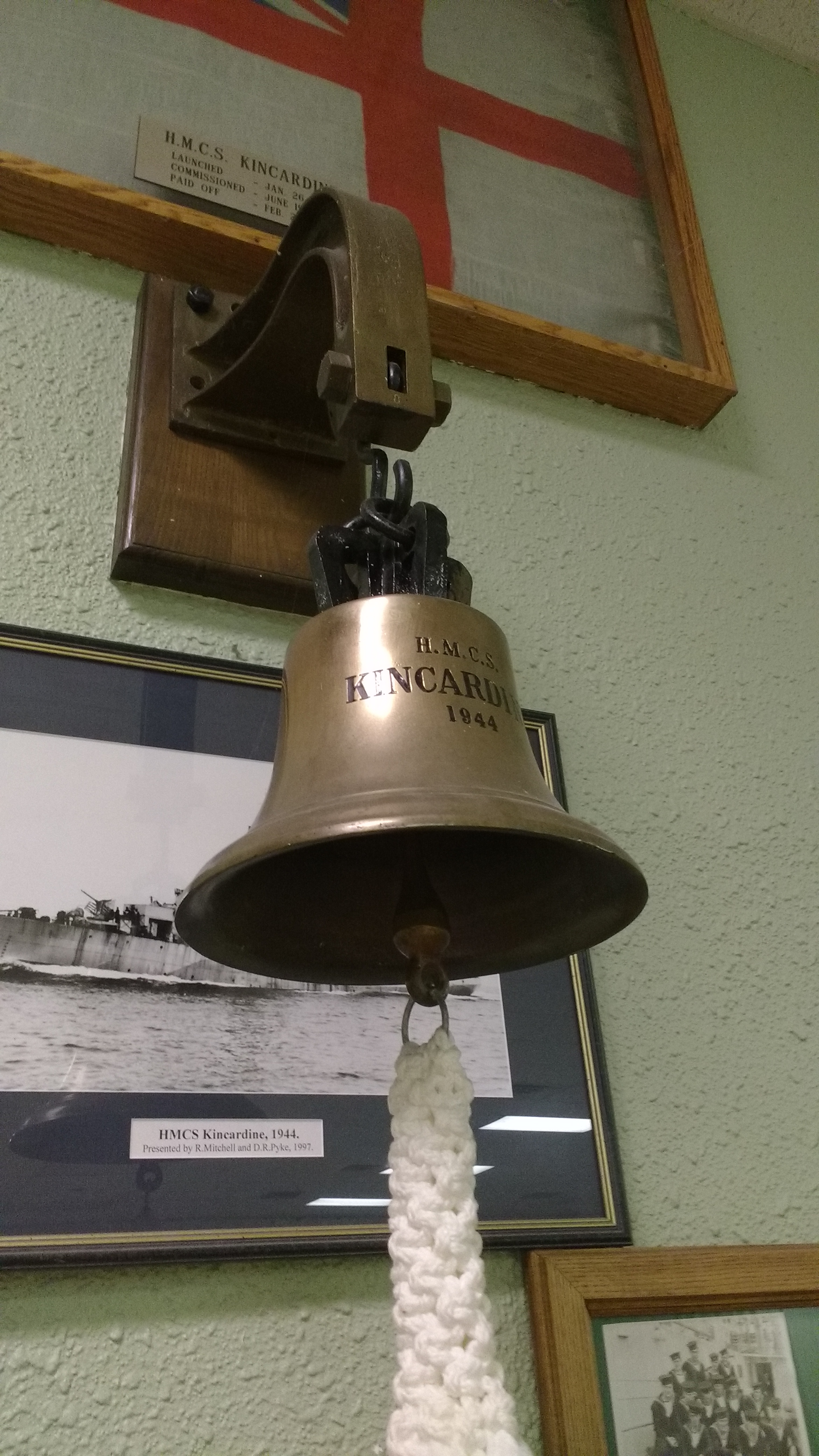
Bell from the ship

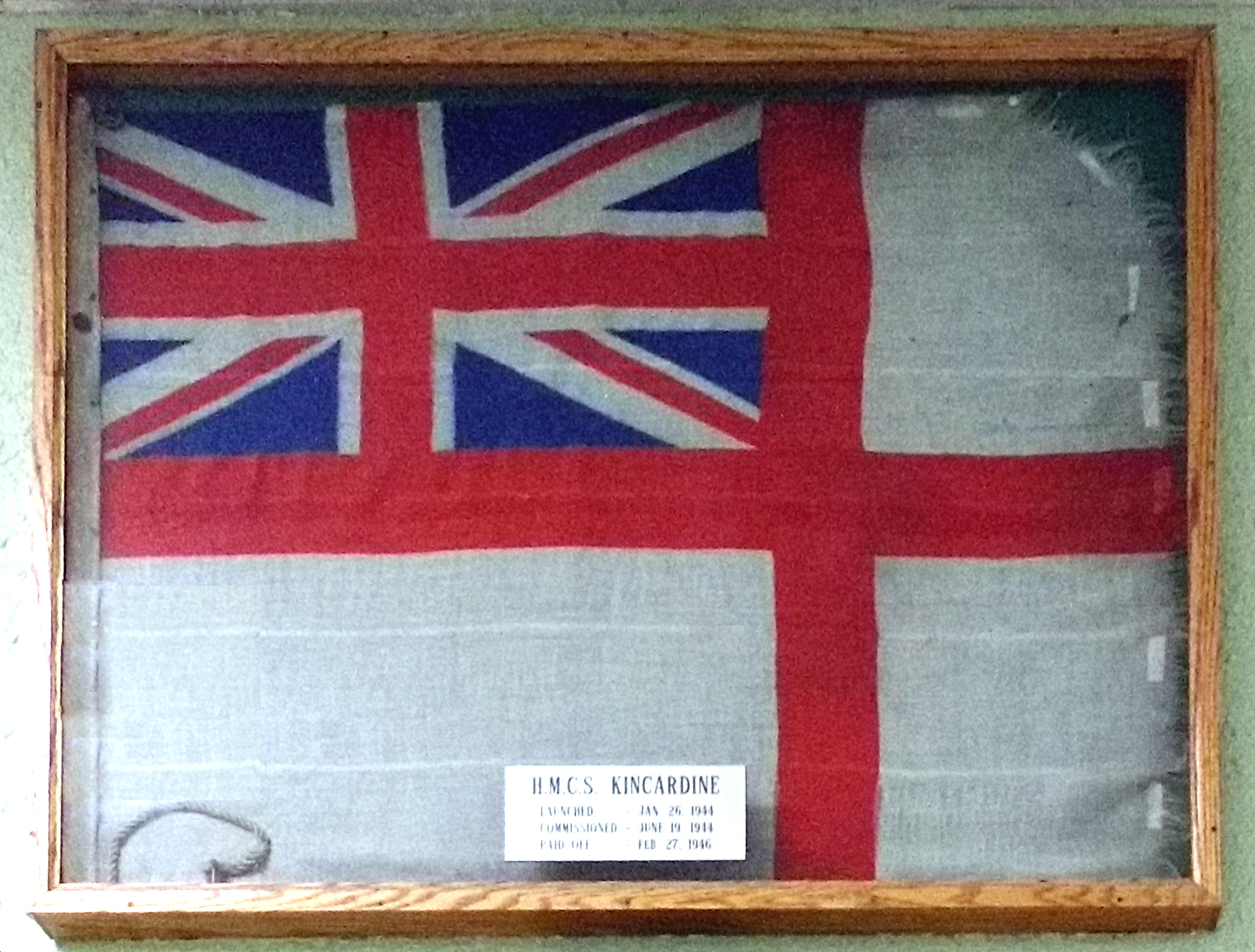
Flag from HMCS Kincardine, on display inside the Royal Canadian Legion hall in Kincardine, Ontario

Tamworth Castle, named for the castle in Tamworth, Staffordshire, was ordered on 19 January 1943. The keel was laid on 25 August 1943 by Smiths Dock Company at their shipyard in South Bank-on-Tees. At some point in 1943, the ship was transferred to the Royal Canadian Navy and was launched on 26 January 1944. The corvette was commissioned into the Royal Canadian Navy on 19 June 1944 at Middlesbrough as HMCS Kincardine, named for the town in Ontario that sits on shores of Lake Huron, with the pennant number K490.

Kincardine worked up at Tobermory before joining the Mid-Ocean Escort Force escort group C-2 in August 1944. However, not long after joining, the ship had to return to Smiths Dock for repairs and was not available for service until mid-September. The corvette was deployed only as a local escort until 2 October when Kincardine joined a trans-Atlantic convoy as escort. Kincardine remained as an ocean convoy escort for the rest of the war.

Kincardine returned to Canada in June 1945, where in July, she was temporarily used as a training ship attached to HMCS Cornwallis. The corvette then underwent a refit at Liverpool, Nova Scotia and was placed in reserve at Halifax in October. Kincardine was paid off at Halifax on 27 February 1946, and sold to the French Government on 5 September 1946. They resold the ex-corvette to Moroccan interests in 1947 who renamed her Saada. (Note: Macpherson and Barrie state that it was this ship that was sold to the Burmese Navy and renamed Van Myo Aung in 1958. However, it was HMS Mariner, whose original name was Kincardine before her transfer to the Royal Navy, that was sold to Burma.) The merchant ship, which had a gross register tonnage of 1,516 tons, was owned by Les Cargos Fruitiers Cherifiens SA and had her port of registry in Casablanca. Saada was broken up at La Spezia, Italy on 15 September 1953.
