= HMCS Mulgrave =

1942 Royal Canadian Navy minesweeper

History

Canada
- Name: Mulgrave
- Namesake: Mulgrave, Nova Scotia
- Builder: Port Arthur Shipbuilding Co., Port Arthur
- Laid down: 15 December 1941
- Launched: 2 May 1942
- Commissioned: 4 November 1942
- Decommissioned: 7 June 1945
- Identification: Pennant number: J313
- Honours and awards: Gulf of St. Lawrence, Atlantic 1943-44, Normandy 1944,
- Fate: Struck naval mine 1944; Sold for scrap 1947

General characteristics
- Class & type: Bangor-class minesweeper
- Displacement: 672 long tons (683 t)
- Length: 180 ft (54.9 m) oa
- Beam: 28 ft 6 in (8.7 m)
- Draught: 9 ft 9 in (3.0 m)
- Propulsion: 2 Admiralty 3-drum water tube boilers, 2 shafts, vertical triple-expansion reciprocating engines, 2,400 ihp (1,790 kW)
- Speed: 16.5 knots (31 km/h)
- Complement: 83
- Armament: 1 × 12-pounder (3 in (76 mm)) 12 cwt HA gun; 1 x QF 2 pdr Mark VIII; 2 × QF 20 mm Oerlikon guns; 40 depth charges as escort

HMCS Mulgrave (pennant J313) was a Bangor-class minesweeper that served with the Royal Canadian Navy during the Second World War. Entering service in 1942, the minesweeper took part in the Battle of the Atlantic and the invasion of Normandy. While sweeping for naval mines off France in 1944, the vessel hit one. The ship was towed back to port where Mulgrave was declared a constructive total loss. Laid up until the end of the war, the minesweeper was broken up in 1947.

== Design and description ==
A British design, the Bangor-class minesweepers were smaller than the preceding Halcyon-class minesweepers in British service, but larger than the Fundy class in Canadian service. They came in two versions powered by different engines; those with a diesel engines and those with vertical triple-expansion steam engines. Mulgrave was of the latter design and was larger than her diesel-engined cousins. The minesweeper was 180 feet (54.9 m) long overall, had a beam of 28 feet 6 inches (8.7 m) and a draught of 9 feet 9 inches (3.0 m). Mulgrave had a displacement of 672 long tons (683 t). She had a complement of 6 officers and 77 enlisted.

Mulgrave had two vertical triple-expansion steam engines, each driving one shaft, using steam provided by two Admiralty three-drum boilers. The engines produced a total of 2,400 indicated horsepower (1,800 kW) and gave a maximum speed of 16.5 knots (30.6 km/h; 19.0 mph). The minesweeper could carry a maximum of 150 long tons (152 t) of fuel oil.

Mulgrave was armed with a single quick-firing (QF) 12-pounder (3 in (76 mm)) 12 cwt HA gun mounted forward. (Note: "Cwt" is the abbreviation for hundredweight, 20 cwt referring to the weight of the gun.) The ship was also fitted with a QF 2-pounder Mark VIII aft and were eventually fitted with single-mounted QF 20 mm Oerlikon guns on the bridge wings. The 2-pounder gun was later replaced with a twin 20 mm Oerlikon mount. Those ships assigned to convoy duty had two depth charge launchers and four chutes to deploy the 40 depth charges they carried.

== Operational history ==
The minesweeper was ordered as part of the 1941–1942 construction programme. The ship's keel was laid down on 15 December 1941 by Port Arthur Shipbuilding Co at their yard in Port Arthur, Ontario. Named for a community in Nova Scotia, Mulgrave was launched on 2 May 1942. The ship was commissioned on 4 November 1942 at Port Arthur.

Mulgrave arrived at Halifax, Nova Scotia on 30 November and was assigned to Halifax Force, the local patrol and escort force. In June 1943, the ship switched to the Western Local Escort Force as a convoy escort as part of the escort group W2 in the Battle of the Atlantic. The minesweeper remained with the unit until February 1944, when the ship was sent to Europe as part of Canada's contribution to the invasion of Normandy. Crossing the Atlantic Ocean via the Azores, Mulgrave went aground at Horta, Azores and had to be towed to Greenock, Scotland. The ship was repaired at Ardrossan before joining the 32nd Minesweeping Flotilla at Plymouth in April. In June, the ship transferred to the 31st Minesweeping Flotilla.

During the invasion, the minesweepers swept and marked channels through the German minefields leading into the invasion beaches in the American sector, with Mulgrave acting as danlayer for the group. The 31st Minesweeping Flotilla swept channel 3 on 6 June. The minesweepers spent the following months clearing the shipping lanes between the United Kingdom and mainland Europe. On 8 October 1944, the 31st Minesweeping Flotilla was sweeping for mines off Le Havre, France when Mulgrave suffered an explosion. The minesweeper had hit a mine and after damage control efforts saved the ship, sister ship Blairmore took the vessel in tow and brought her to Le Havre.

Mulgrave was towed to Portsmouth where the vessel was declared a constructive total loss. The Royal Canadian Navy placed the vessel in reserve at Falmouth in January 1945. Mulgrave was paid off on 7 June 1945 at Falmouth. In May 1947, the minesweeper was taken to Llanelly, Wales, beached and broken up.

== Notes ==
=== Sources ===
- Chesneau, Roger, ed. (1980). Conway's All the World's Fighting Ships 1922–1946. Greenwich, UK: Conway Maritime Press. ISBN 0-85177-146-7.
- Colledge, J. J.; Warlow, Ben (2006) [1969]. Ships of the Royal Navy: The Complete Record of All Fighting Ships of the Royal Navy from the 15th Century to the Present (3rd Rev ed.). London: Chatham Publishing. ISBN 978-1-86176-281-8. OCLC 67375475.
- Douglas, W.A.B.; Sarty, Roger; Whitby, Michael (2007). A Blue Water Navy: The Official Operational History of the Royal Canadian Navy in the Second World War, 1943–1945 Volume II, Part II. St. Catharines, Ontario: Vanwell Publishing. ISBN 978-1-55125-069-4.
- Macpherson, Ken (1997). Minesweepers of the Royal Canadian Navy 1938–1945. St. Catharines, Ontario: Vanwell Publishing Limited. ISBN 0-920277-55-1.
- Macpherson, Ken; Barrie, Ron (2002). The Ships of Canada's Naval Forces 1910–2002 (Third ed.). St. Catharines, Ontario: Vanwell Publishing. ISBN 1-55125-072-1.
- Schull, Joseph (1961). The Far Distant Ships: An Official Account of Canadian Naval Operations in the Second World War. Ottawa: Queen's Printer. OCLC 19974782.
