= HMCS West York =

Modified Flower-class corvette

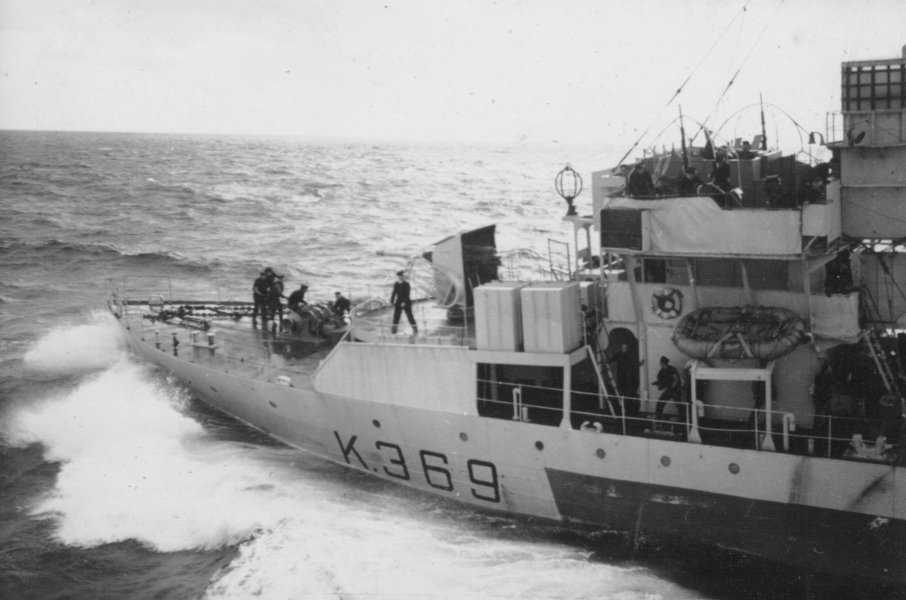
- West York's bow during a transfer with HMCS Fergus

History

Canada
- Name: West York
- Namesake: Weston, Ontario
- Ordered: June 1942
- Builder: Midland Shipyards. Ltd., Midland
- Laid down: 23 July 1943
- Launched: 25 January 1944
- Commissioned: 6 October 1944
- Decommissioned: 9 July 1945
- Identification: Pennant number: K369
- Honours and awards: Atlantic 1945
- Fate: Sold for mercantile conversion; sunk in collision 1960

General characteristics
- Class & type: Modified Flower-class corvette
- Displacement: 1,015 long tons (1,031 t; 1,137 short tons)
- Length: 208 ft (63.4 m)o/a
- Beam: 33 ft (10.1 m)
- Draught: 11 ft (3.35 m)
- Installed power: 2 × water tube boilers; 1 × 4-cylinder triple-expansion reciprocating steam engine; 2,750 ihp (2,050 kW)
- Propulsion: single shaft
- Speed: 16 knots (29.6 km/h)
- Range: 3,500 nautical miles (6,482 km) at 12 knots (22.2 km/h)
- Complement: 90
- Sensors & processing systems: 1 × Type 271 SW2C radar; 1 × Type 144 sonar
- Armament: 1 × 4 in (102 mm) QF Mk XIX naval gun; 1 × 2-pounder. Mk.VIII single "pom-pom" AA gun; 2 × 20 mm Oerlikon single; 1 × Hedgehog A/S mortar; 4 × Mk.II depth charge throwers; 2 depth charge rails with 70 depth charges

HMCS West York was a Flower-class corvette of the Royal Canadian Navy which took part in convoy escort duties during the Second World War. Named after Weston, Ontario, she was built by Midland Shipyards Ltd. in Midland, Ontario and commissioned on 6 October 1944 at Collingwood.

== Background ==
Flower-class corvettes like West York serving with the Royal Canadian Navy during the Second World War were different from earlier and more traditional sail-driven corvettes. The "corvette" designation was created by the French as a class of small warships; the Royal Navy borrowed the term for a period but discontinued its use in 1877. During the hurried preparations for war in the late 1930s, Winston Churchill reactivated the corvette class, needing a name for smaller ships used in an escort capacity, in this case based on a whaling ship design. The generic name "flower" was used to designate the class of these ships, which – in the Royal Navy – were named after flowering plants.

Corvettes commissioned by the Royal Canadian Navy during the Second World War were named after communities for the most part, to better represent the people who took part in building them. This idea was put forth by Admiral Percy W. Nelles. Sponsors were commonly associated with the community for which the ship was named. Royal Navy corvettes were designed as open sea escorts, while Canadian corvettes were developed for coastal auxiliary roles which was exemplified by their minesweeping gear. Eventually the Canadian corvettes would be modified to allow them to perform better on the open seas.

== Construction and career ==
West York was ordered in June 1942 as part of the 1943-44 Increased Endurance Flower-class building program, which followed the main layout of the 1942-43 program. The only significant difference is that the majority of the 43-44 program replaced the 2-pounder Mk.VIII single "pom-pom" anti-aircraft gun with 2 twin 20-mm and 2 single 20-mm anti-aircraft guns. West York was laid down by Midland Shipyards Ltd. at Midland, Ontario 23 July 1943 and launched 25 January 1944. She was commissioned into the RCN 6 October 1944 at Collingwood.

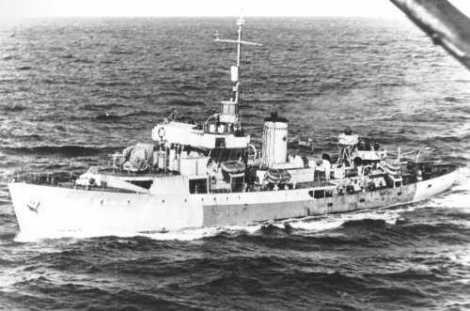
HMCS West York at sea

West York arrived at Halifax in mid-November, 1944 and left a month later for Bermuda to work up. In February, 1945, she joined the Mid-Ocean Escort Force escort group EG C-5 at St. John's, leaving on 16 February to rendezvous with her first transatlantic convoy, HX 338. She made three round trips across the Atlantic before the end of her career, the last one as escort to ON 305, which she joined from Londonderry at the end of May 1945.

West York was paid off on 9 July 1945 and laid up at Sorel, Quebec. She was sold into mercantile service as SS West York. As SS West York, she was towing the decommissioned HMCS Assiniboine when the towline parted and the destroyer was wrecked on 7 November 1945 off Prince Edward Island.

By 1947, she had her steam reciprocating engine replaced by diesel power and sailed under Moroccan registry as the Moulay Bouchaib. As late as 1950, she was the Italian Espresso. She returned to Canadian registry in 1959 as Federal Express. She was moored in Montreal on the evening of 5 May 1960, when she was struck by the Swedish Polaris. Holed and with her mooring lines carried away, Federal Express careened into the Danish Hilda Maersk and sank in 30 minutes. Later that year, the after part of the ship was raised and broken up for scrap.
