= HMCS Blairmore =

Minesweeper of the Royal Canadian Navy

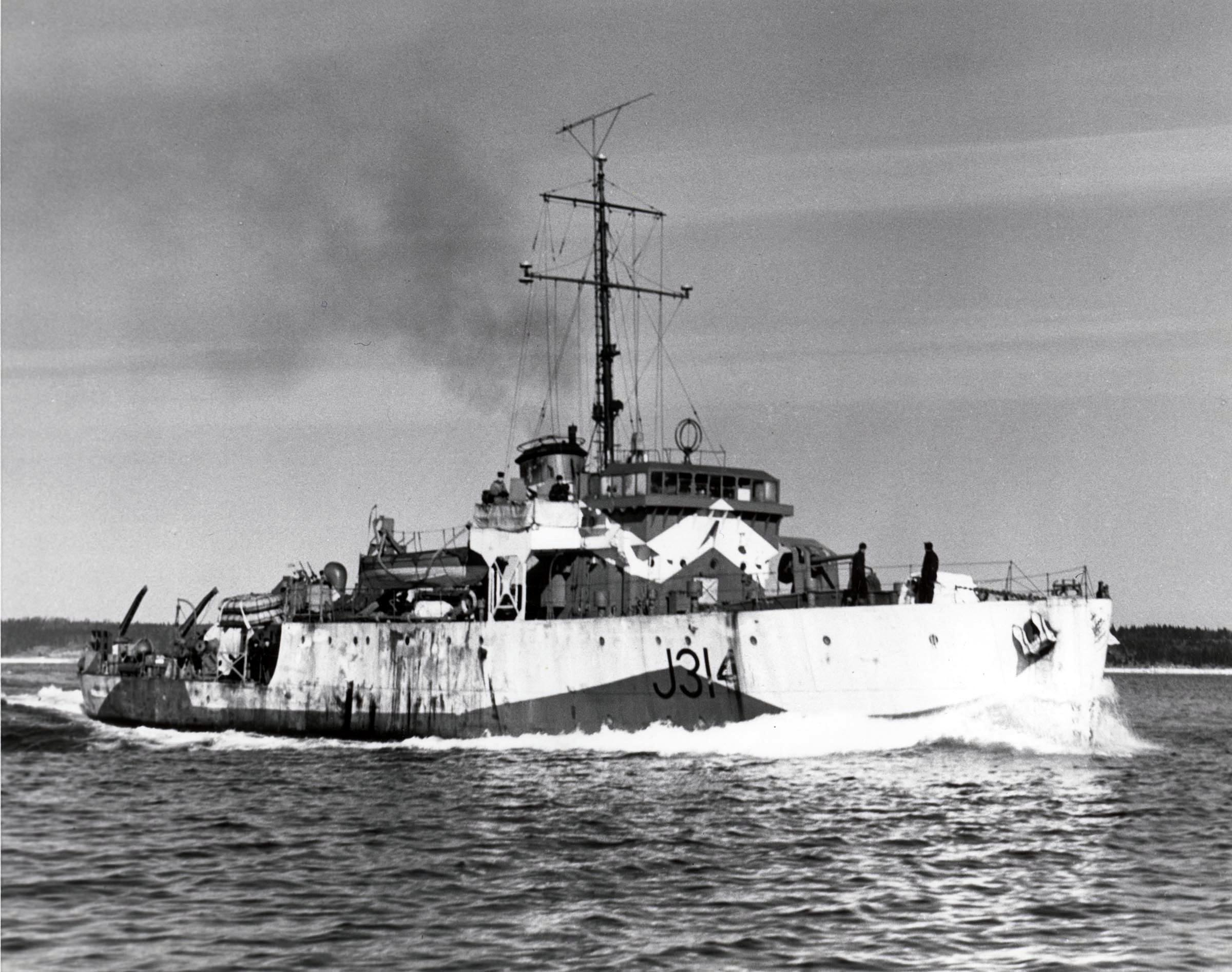

History

Canada
- Name: Blairmore
- Namesake: Blairmore, Alberta
- Builder: Port Arthur Shipbuilding Co, Port Arthur
- Laid down: 2 January 1942
- Launched: 14 May 1942
- Commissioned: 17 November 1942
- Decommissioned: 16 October 1945
- Identification: Pennant number: J314
- Honours and awards: Atlantic 1943-45, Normandy 1944
- Fate: Transferred to Turkish Navy 1958

Turkey
- Name: Beycoz
- Acquired: 29 March 1958
- Fate: Discarded 1971

General characteristics
- Class & type: Bangor-class minesweeper
- Displacement: 672 long tons (683 t)
- Length: 180 ft (54.9 m) oa
- Beam: 28 ft 6 in (8.7 m)
- Draught: 9 ft 9 in (3.0 m)
- Propulsion: 2 Admiralty 3-drum water tube boilers, 2 shafts, vertical triple-expansion reciprocating engines, 2,400 ihp (1,790 kW)
- Speed: 16.5 knots (31 km/h)
- Complement: 83
- Armament: 1 × 12-pounder (3 in (76 mm)) 12 cwt HA gun; 1 x QF 2 pdr Mark VIII; 2 × QF 20 mm Oerlikon guns; 40 depth charges as escort

HMCS Blairmore (pennant J314) was a Bangor-class minesweeper that served with the Royal Canadian Navy during the Second World War. Entering service in 1942, the ship took part in the Battle of the Atlantic and the invasion of Normandy. Following the war, the ship was laid up until 1958 when the Blairmore was transferred to the Turkish Navy. Renamed Beycoz, the vessel was discarded in 1971.

== Design and description ==
A British design, the Bangor-class minesweepers were smaller than the preceding Halcyon-class minesweepers in British service, but larger than the Fundy class in Canadian service. They came in two versions powered by different engines; those with a diesel engines and those with vertical triple-expansion steam engines. Blaimore was of the latter design and was larger than her diesel-engined cousins. The minesweeper was 180 feet (54.9 m) long overall, had a beam of 28 feet 6 inches (8.7 m) and a draught of 9 feet 9 inches (3.0 m). Blairmore had a displacement of 672 long tons (683 t). She had a complement of 6 officers and 77 enlisted.

Blairmore had two vertical triple-expansion steam engines, each driving one shaft, using steam provided by two Admiralty three-drum boilers. The engines produced a total of 2,400 indicated horsepower (1,800 kW) and gave a maximum speed of 16.5 knots (30.6 km/h; 19.0 mph). The minesweeper could carry a maximum of 150 long tons (152 t) of fuel oil.

Blairmore was armed with a single quick-firing (QF) 12-pounder (3 in (76 mm)) 12 cwt HA gun mounted forward. (Note: "Cwt" is the abbreviation for hundredweight, 20 cwt referring to the weight of the gun.) The ship was also fitted with a QF 2-pounder Mark VIII aft and were eventually fitted with single-mounted QF 20 mm Oerlikon guns on the bridge wings. Those ships assigned to convoy duty had two depth charge launchers and four chutes to deploy the 40 depth charges they carried.

== Operational history ==
The minesweeper was ordered as part of the 1941–1942 construction programme. The ship's keel was laid down on 2 January 1942 by Port Arthur Shipbuilding Co at their yard in Port Arthur, Ontario. Named for a community in Alberta, Blairmore was launched on 14 May 1942. The ship was commissioned on 17 November 1942 at Port Arthur.

After arriving at Halifax, Nova Scotia on 24 December 1942, the minesweeper was assigned to Western Local Escort Force as a convoy escort. In June 1943, the force was re-organized into escort groups and Blairmore joined W-4. The ship served with W-4 until February 1944. That month, the minesweeper was ordered to European waters as part of Canada's contribution to the invasion of Normandy.

Upon arrival in March, Blairmore was assigned to the 31st Minesweeping Flotilla. During the invasion, Blairmore and her fellow minesweepers swept and marked channels through the German minefields leading into the invasion beaches in the American sector. The 31st Minesweeping Flotilla swept channel 3 on 6 June, completing the task unmolested by the Germans. The minesweepers spent the following months clearing the shipping lanes between the United Kingdom and mainland Europe. On 8 October 1944, the 31st Minesweeping Flotilla was sweeping for mines off Le Havre, France when sister ship Mulgrave suffered an explosion. The minesweeper had hit a mine and after damage control efforts saved the ship, Blairmore took the vessel in tow and brought her to Le Havre. In April 1945, the ship sailed to Canada for a refit at Halifax and returned to Plymouth in July. The minesweeper remained in European waters attached to Plymouth Command until 21 September 1945.

After returning to Canada, the minesweeper was paid off at Sydney, Nova Scotia on 16 October 1945. Blairmore was sold to Marine Industries and placed in strategic reserve at Sorel, Quebec in 1946. In July 1951 the minesweeper was reacquired by the Royal Canadian Navy during the Korean War. The vessel was taken to Sydney, Nova Scotia and given the new hull number FSE 193 and re-designated a coastal escort. However, the ship never recommissioned and remained in reserve at Sydney until 29 March 1958 when Blairmore was formally transferred to the Turkish Navy. Renamed Beycoz by the Turkish Navy, the vessel remained in service until 1971 when it was discarded. The vessel was broken up in Turkey in 1971.
