= HMCS Lynx =

Royal Canadian Navy vessel

History
- Name: Dolphin (1922–1929); Ramona (1929–1940)
- Owner: Mortimer L. Schiff (1922–1929); Guernsey Curran (1929); John W. Hubbard (1929–1940)
- Port of registry: (United States) New York
- Builder: Newport News Shipbuilding, Newport News, Virginia
- Yard number: 263
- Completed: June 1922
- Out of service: 1940
- Fate: Acquired by Royal Canadian Navy in 1940

Canada
- Name: Lynx
- Namesake: lynx
- Commissioned: 26 August 1940
- Decommissioned: 23 April 1943
- Fate: Sold 1943
- Name: Elena (1943–1951); Samana Queen (1951); Rican Star (1952–1960)
- In service: 1943
- Out of service: 1960
- Fate: Sank off Hummocky Island, Queensland on 25 May 1960

General characteristics in naval service
- Type: Armed yacht
- Displacement: 495 long tons (503 t)
- Length: 181 ft (55.2 m)
- Beam: 24 ft (7.3 m)
- Draught: 9 ft (2.7 m)
- Propulsion: Diesel engine, 2 propellers
- Speed: 10 knots (19 km/h; 12 mph)
- Complement: 40
- Sensors & processing systems: Asdic
- Armament: 1 × 4 in (102 mm) gun; 1 × Lewis machine gun; 15 depth charges

HMCS Lynx was an armed yacht in service with the Royal Canadian Navy (RCN) during World War II. The vessel was built at Newport News Shipbuilding as the yacht Dolphin in 1922. The yacht was sold in 1929, becoming Ramona. In 1940, the RCN acquired the vessel as part of the effort to bolster its patrol forces, armed and renamed the vessel Lynx. However, the vessel suffered a series of mechanical issues and was taken out of service in 1943 and sold for commercial service. Renamed Elena and then Samana Queen the ship was used in the banana boat trade, taking on its final name Rican Star in 1952. The vessel was converted to a fishing trawler in 1959 before sinking on 25 May 1960 off Hummocky Island, Queensland.

== Description ==
Built as a yacht, the vessel measured 495 gross register tons (GRT), 169 feet 0 inches (51.5 m) long between perpendiculars with a beam of 23 feet 11 inches (7.3 m). The vessel was powered by a diesel engine driving two propellers.

In naval service Lynx had a displacement of 495 long tons (503 t) with a length of 181 ft (55.2 m), a beam of 24 ft (7.3 m) and a draught of 9 ft (2.7 m). Using the same propulsion unit, the vessel had a maximum speed of 10 knots (19 km/h; 12 mph) and a complement of 5 officers and 35 ratings. The ship was armed with one 4-inch (102 mm) gun. Lynx was given 15 depth charges, depth charge rails and throwers, asdic and a Lewis machine gun.

== Service history ==
The yacht was constructed by Newport News Shipbuilding at their yard in Newport News, Virginia, United States with the yard number 263. Given the name Dolphin by its owner Mortimer L. Schiff, the yacht was completed in June 1922 and registered in New York. In 1929, Dolphin was sold to Guernsey Curran and renamed Ramona. John W. Hubbard acquired the yacht in 1930, keeping the name, but re-registering the vessel in Pittsburgh, Pennsylvania.

With the outbreak of World War II in 1939, the Royal Canadian Navy (RCN) sought to augment the local sea defences of East Coast ports. The RCN sought large, steel-hulled yachts to requisition to bolster their patrols. However, a significant lack of capable vessels were owned by Canadians. Canada turned to its southern neighbour for suitable ships, finding several that met the navy's requirements. However, US neutrality laws prevented their sale to belligerents in the war. In order to circumvent these laws, the RCN requisitioned the yachts of prominent Canadian yachtsmen. The RCN then sent them to the US to purchase the yachts that had been identified by the navy without the US government knowing they were working for the navy. The money to acquire the vessels was provided by the Canadian government through bank loans. Tom K. Wade of Toronto, Ontario, a member of the Royal Canadian Yacht Club and an executive of the Salada Tea Company was among those chosen and he was sent south to acquire the yacht Ramona. After arrival at Halifax, Nova Scotia, the yacht was sent to Quebec City, Quebec for conversion to an armed yacht with HMCS Husky.

Renamed Lynx, the armed yacht returned to Halifax, where it was commissioned on 26 August 1940 and assigned to Sydney Force, the local escort force operating from Sydney, Nova Scotia. On the way to Sydney, Lynx broke a crankshaft and was forced to return to Halifax on one engine due to the lack of spare parts at end of 1940. Laid up under repair until July 1941, Lynx returned to service with Gaspe Force, the naval unit charged with defending the Gulf of St. Lawrence and the St. Lawrence River. Once again, Lynx broke a shaft, this time off Rimouski, Quebec. The armed yacht was laid up for repairs and returned to service after the river had closed due to ice in the winter months. Lynx was assigned to Shelburne, Nova Scotia for anti-submarine patrols and use as an examination vessel. On 18 January 1942, Lynx rescued the entire crew of Empire Kingfisher which had sunk off Cape Sable after striking an object. That same month, Lynx was hunting a German submarine off Cape Sable when one of its depth charges, which had been set too shallow, damaged the ship. This caused further engine troubles which led the RCN to dispose of the ship.

Lynx was paid off on 23 April 1942. The RCN initially intended to use the ship as a target and for it to be sunk offshore and Lynx was stripped of all usable parts. However, plans changed and instead, the vessel was sold on 3 November 1942 to John Sims of Halifax for $100. The sale was stopped, as the ship was considered more valuable then price, and once again, Lynx was intended to be used as a gunnery target. As before, before the ship was sunk, the vessel was purchased.

=== Commercial service and fate ===
The vessel was acquired in July 1943 by Cia Central de Nav SA, renamed Elena and registered in Puerto Cortés, Honduras for use in the banana boat trade in the Caribbean Sea, Mexico and Toronto. In 1951, Samara Lines Inc. acquired the vessel, renaming it Samara Queen but continuing to use it in the banana boat trade. In 1952, Samara Queen was purchased by Rican Star Line for use as a banana boat and registered in Puerto Limón, Costa Rica and renamed Rican Star. During its time as a banana boat, the vessel became embroiled in a conflict between the fruit companies United Fruit Company and Standard Fruit. While in port, the ship was intentionally scuttled when someone opened the sea cocks and flooded the engine room. The ship settled onto the bottom and was later raised and returned to service. In 1958, Northland Navigation Company of Vancouver, British Columbia, Canada acquired the vessel and intended to use it for coastal trading. The ship did not pass inspection and its registry was refused in Canada. In 1959, Rican Star was acquired by Pacific Sg Co Pty Ltd, converted to a fishing trawler in the shrimp trade and registered in Brisbane, Australia. In 1960 H. Middleborough bought the vessel. On 25 May 1960, Rican Star sank near Hummocky Island, Queensland, Australia.
