= HMCS Marvita =

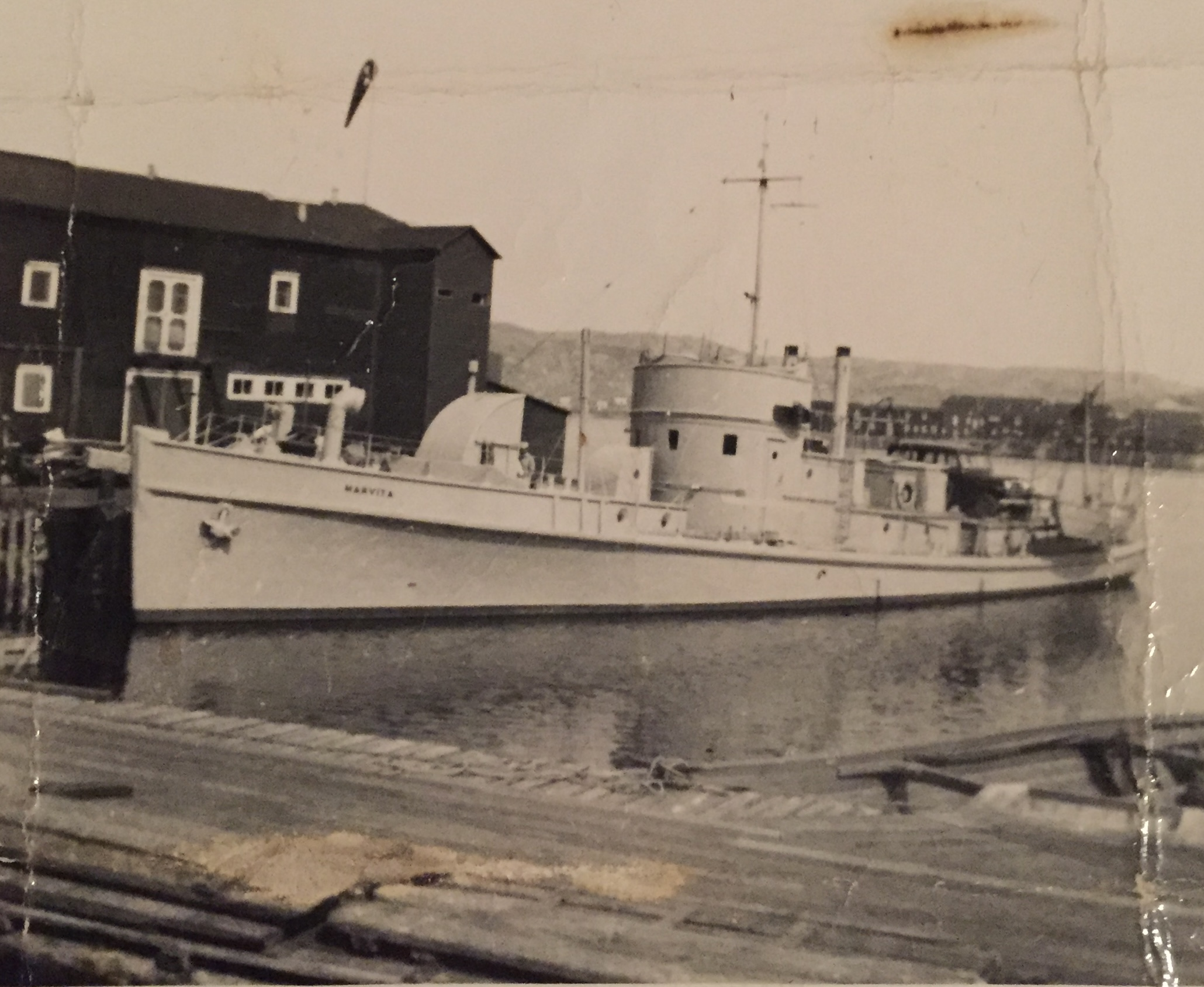
- MV Marvita early 1950s

History
- Name: Marvita
- Owner: Marvite Ltd. (1930–1933); Riverport Shipping Co. Ltd. (1934); Government of Newfoundland (1935–1954)
- Operator: Royal Canadian Navy (1941–1945); Department of Revenue (1949–1954)
- Port of registry: La Have, NS, CAN (1930 - 1931); Bridgetown, Barbados (1931 - 1935); St. John's, NL (1935 - 1949); St. John's, NL, CAN (1949 - 1954
- Builder: J. Ernest & Sons, Mahone Bay
- Completed: 1930
- Acquired: 1 May 1941
- In service: 22 October 1930
- Out of service: 15 July 1954
- Identification: Official Number 156691; Code Letters VOCB; Code Letters CYRK (1941 - 1945)
- Fate: Foundered 15 July 1954

General characteristics
- Tonnage: 122 GRT; 83 NRT
- Length: 105 ft (32 m)
- Beam: 20 ft (6.1 m)
- Depth: 8.4 ft (2.6 m)
- Decks: 2
- Installed power: 2 x 6 cyl, Fairbanks Morse opposed piston engines, output: 232 nhp
- Propulsion: 2 screws
- Speed: 18 knots (33 km/h; 21 mph) max.
- Crew: 9

MV Marvita also known as HMCS Marvita (Z44) was a former rum runner, Royal Canadian Navy auxiliary vessel, and customs vessel that operated from 1930 until it ran aground and sank on 15 July 1954.

== History ==
=== Early career ===
Marvita started her career as a cargo vessel and rum runner, running liquor between St-Pierre and Miquelon, Newfoundland and Canada, as part of the Nova Scotia Banana Fleet. She had two 23,000 gallon copper-lined tanks that would be filled with illegal whiskey. She made a total of 23 trips as a rum runner, totalling 1,058,000 gallons of whiskey. In all trips, she was never caught and never had to drop her load. She was sold to the Government of Newfoundland in 1935.

=== 1935–1941 ===
On 17 July 1939 Marvita and sister ship Shulamite were in attendance and on patrol, for the arrival of King George VI and Queen Elizabeth at Holyrood, Newfoundland.

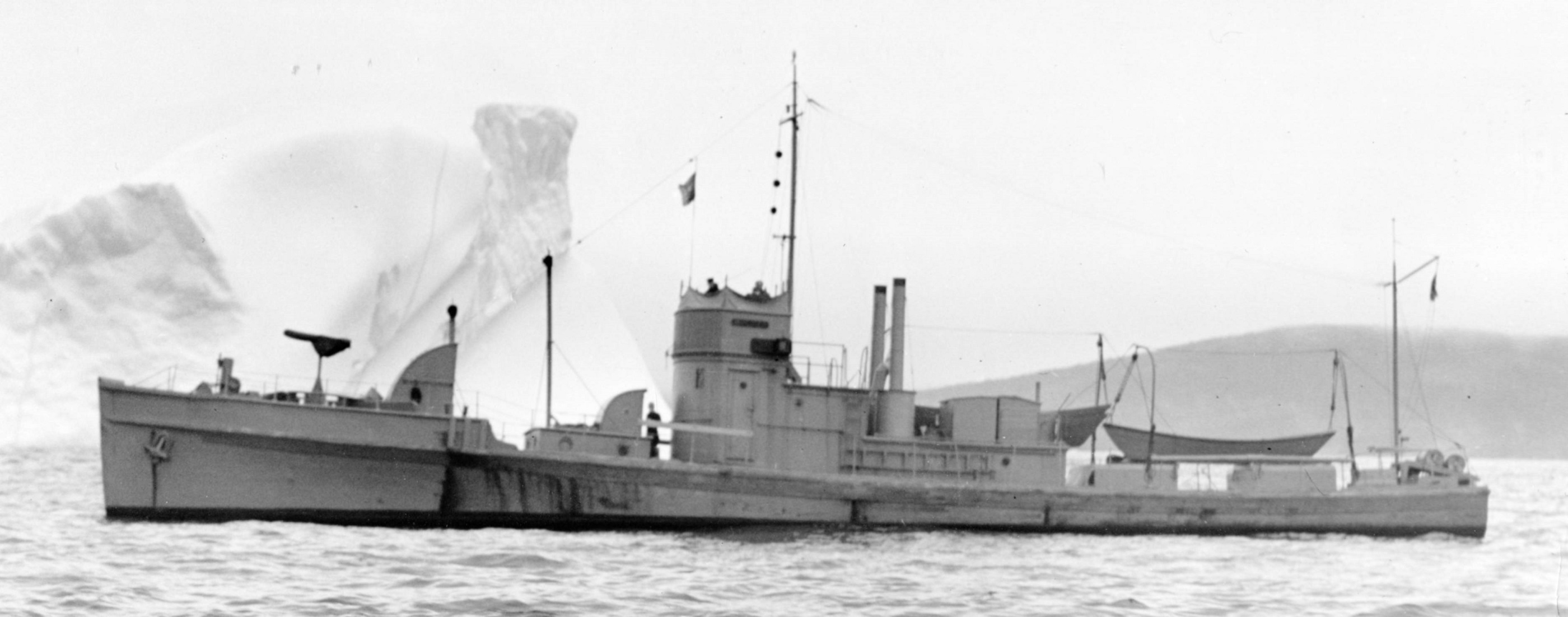

=== Royal Canadian Navy ===
During the Second World War in 1941, Marvita was acquired by the Royal Canadian Navy to serve as an auxiliary examination vessel. In September 1941, Marvita brought HMS Candytuft to safety after that vessel had suffered a boiler explosion, which killed 11 sailors. She was paid off and returned to the Government of Newfoundland in 1945.

=== Department of Revenue ===
In 1946 Marvita was used as a polling station along the Labrador coast during the National Convention. In 1949, Marvita was transferred to the Canadian Department of Revenue to serve as customs boat along the coast of Newfoundland. In mid 1952, Marvita, along with MV Western Explorer, took part in a federal-provincial survey of the coastal outport communities of Newfoundland. In July 1953, Marvita towed the MV Christmas Seal to St. John's for rudder repairs, after that ship struck a rock at Pool's Island.

=== Sinking ===
On 15 July 1954 Marvita was en route from Argentia to St. John's, carrying 9 crew and 1 passenger. Near Cape Ballard, Cappahayden, the vessel entered thick fog which resulted in zero visibility. The magnetic compass onboard become defective and the vessel steered too close into the coast. The vessel ran aground on a sunker. The ship's captain, Mike MacDonald, ordered all aboard on deck and they successfully escaped to shore; there were no deaths. After a few moments, the swells swallowed the Marvita and she was lost.

== Additional information ==
Marvita had one sister ship, MV Shulamite, also built in Mahone Bay, Nova Scotia in 1930, and acquired by the RCN in 1941. She was later renamed Norsya and foundered on 19 September 1953.
