= HMCS Suderoy =

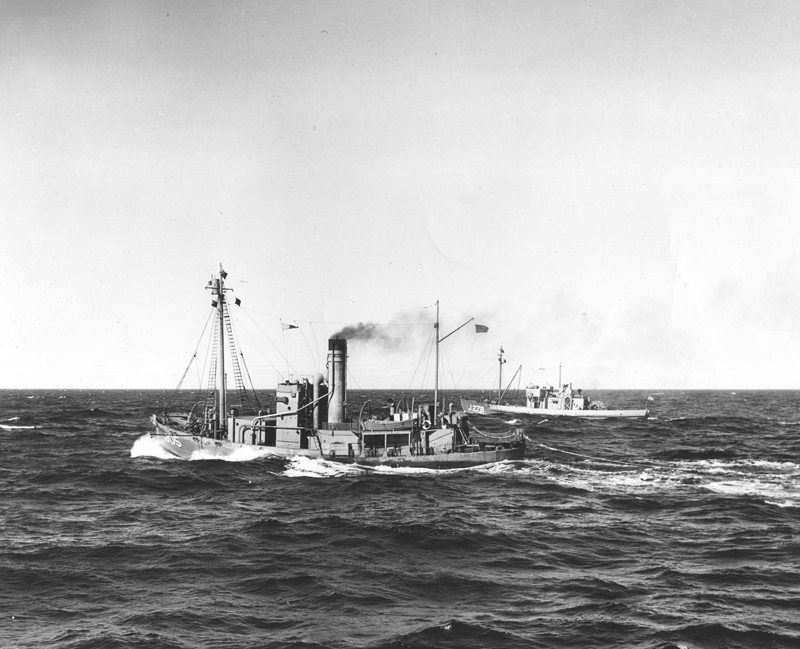
- HMCS Suderöy VI (foreground) and HMCS Llewllyn, 1944

History

Canada
- Name: Suderöy VI
- Launched: 1929 and 1930
- Commissioned: June 1941
- Decommissioned: August 1945
- Fate: Returned to owners, October 1945

General characteristics
- Type: Minesweeper
- Tonnage: 252 GRT
- Length: 115 ft (35 m)
- Beam: 24 ft (7.3 m)
- Draught: 13 ft (4.0 m)
- Propulsion: Suderøy IV & Suderøy V : Triple Expansion engine (Nylands), 750 ihp (559 kW); Suderøy VI : Triple Expansion engine (Shields Eng. Co., North Shields), 760 ihp (567 kW)
- Speed: 9 knots (10 mph; 17 km/h)
- Complement: 4 officers and 25 crew

After the fall of Norway to Nazi Germany on 10 June 1940, the Norwegian whale factory ship Suderøy and her whale catchers, Suderøy IV (J03), Suderøy V (J04), Suderøy VI (J05) and Star XVI were ordered to sail to Halifax from Hampton Roads, where they had taken refuge. In June 1940, at Halifax, Suderøy IV, V and VI were chartered from the Norwegian government in exile by the Royal Canadian Navy, converted and commissioned as minesweepers.

== Ships ==
- Suderøy IV was launched at Oslo, Norway, in 1930. Served with the Halifax Local Defence Force from June 1941 until paid off in August 1945, and returned to her former owners. Condemned and sunk October 1987.
- Suderøy V was launched at Oslo, Norway, in 1930. Served with both the St. John's Local Defence Force and the Halifax Local Defence Force from June 1941 until paid off in August 1945, and returned to her former owners. In use as of 2001.
- Suderøy VI was built in Middlesbrough, UK, and launched in 1929 as Southern Gem. Served with the Halifax Local Defence Force from March 1941 until paid off in August 1945, and returned to her former owners to resume her occupation as whale catcher. Sunk January 1983.

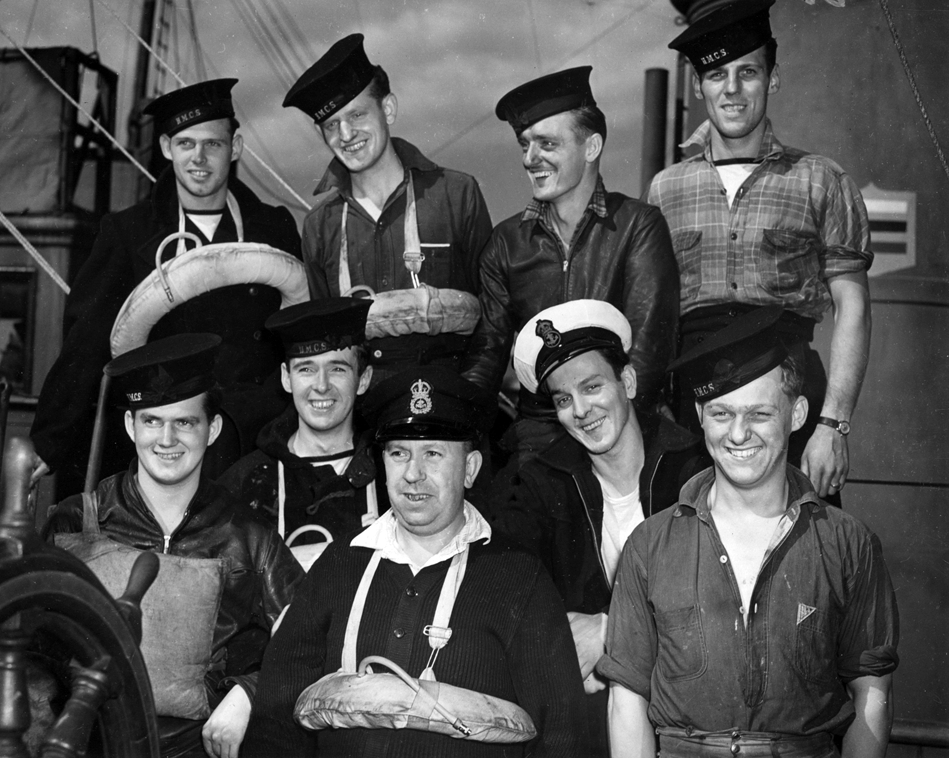
Crew, HMCS Suderoy IV, 1943
