= Meteghan =

Community in Nova Scotia, Canada

Coordinates: 44°11′18″N 66°9′42″W

Meteghan in Nova Scotia

Meteghan is a community in the Canadian province of Nova Scotia, located in Digby County. It is located approximately 40 kilometers (25 miles) northeast of Yarmouth.

== History ==
Founded in 1785 by Prudent Robichaud, Joseph LeBlanc, and other Acadian families, it draws its name from the Mi'kmaq term "Mitihikan" meaning blue rocks.

A sawmill was erected in Meteghan in 1877. The sawmill burned down twice and was rebuilt, eventually closing in the 1980s. In 2001, the site began operating as the Bangor Sawmill Museum. The building was destroyed by fire in 2024.

== Economy ==
This community is also the French Shore's busiest port with draggers, trawlers, seiners, cod, crab and lobster boats docking there. The fishing industry has long been the main source of income in Meteghan. Clare's shipbuilding industry began in Meteghan in 1890 with the construction of the first dry dock built in conjunction with a shipyard. Notable vessels include the Royal Canadian Navy training schooner HMCS Venture, built in 1937. The largest remaining shipyard is the A.F. Theriault & Sons Shipyard in nearby Meteghan River.

It is home to Smuggler's Cove Provincial Park. Meteghan is the largest of several communities that make up the Clare Municipal District.

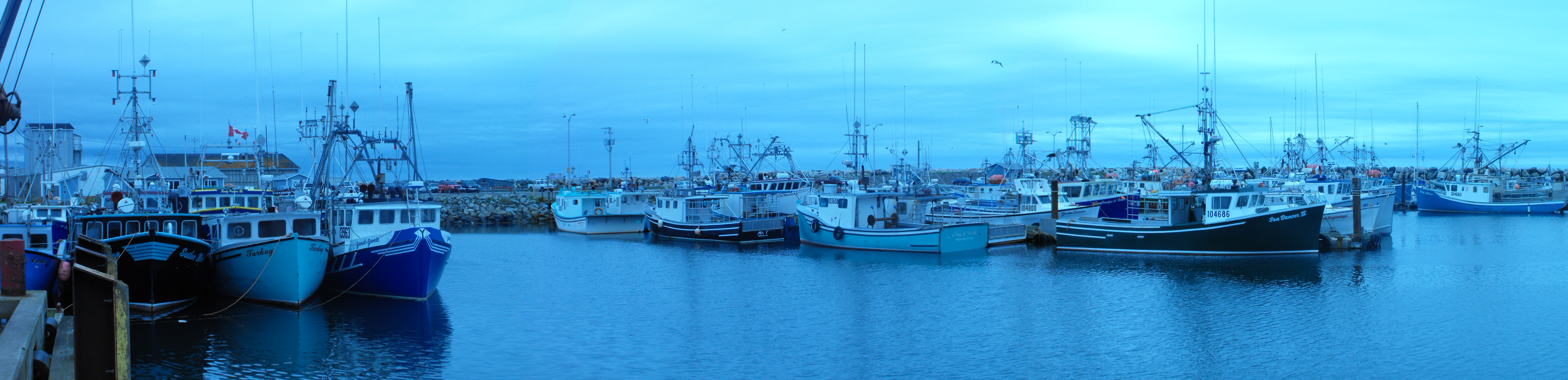
Meteghan fishing fleet
