= HMCS Venture =

Military training ship in Canada

History

Canada
- Name: Venture
- Ordered: 1935
- Builder: Meteghan Shipbuilding Ltd. Co., Meteghan, Nova Scotia
- Laid down: 4 January 1937
- Launched: 9 June 1937
- Commissioned: 25 October 1937
- Decommissioned: 1 September 1939
- Maiden voyage: 1 January 1938
- Recommissioned: November 1941
- Decommissioned: 13 May 1943
- Out of service: December 1945
- Renamed: Harbour Craft 190 (19 May 1943)
- Fate: Sold 10 December 1945 to private investors, renamed Alfred & Emily
- Renamed: Alfred & Emily
- In service: 10 December 1945
- Fate: Sank after catching fire, 1951

General characteristics
- Class & type: Three-masted schooner
- Tonnage: 250 long tons (250 t; 280 short tons)
- Length: 142 ft (43.3 m)
- Beam: 27 ft (8.2 m)
- Draught: 14.5 ft (4.42 m)
- Propulsion: sail, diesel auxiliary engine
- Sail plan: 12,000 ft^{2} (1,100 m^{2}) of sail
- Complement: 40 including 24 trainees
- Armament: 2 × 3-pounder naval gun

HMCS Venture was a three-masted schooner built for the Royal Canadian Navy as a training ship in 1937. She served during the Second World War at Halifax, Nova Scotia. She was the second vessel commissioned by the Royal Canadian Navy to bear the name Venture. In 1943, the schooner was renamed Harbour Craft 190. The schooner was sold to private interests following the war and renamed Alfred & Emily before being lost by fire in 1951.

== Description ==
Venture was a three-masted schooner that had a tonnage of 250 long tons (250 t; 280 short tons) and was 142 ft (43.3 m) long overall, with a beam of 27 ft (8.2 m) and a draught of 14.5 ft (4.42 m). The vessel was equipped with 12,000 ft^{2} (1,100 m^{2}) of sail and a diesel auxiliary engine. The schooner had a complement of 40, including 24 trainees. The vessel was armed with two 3-pounder guns.

== Construction and service ==
Venture was ordered in 1935 as the Royal Canadian Navy began to expand. The vessel was constructed by Meteghan Shipbuilding Ltd. Co. at Meteghan, Nova Scotia. The schooner was launched in June 1937 and was commissioned into the Royal Canadian Navy on 25 October 1937. Venture was based at Halifax, Nova Scotia as a training ship.

Venture was paid off on 1 September 1939 with war imminent. She was one of only thirteen Royal Canadian Navy ships in service at the outbreak of the Second World War. She became an accommodation vessel at Halifax for Royal Navy ratings assigned to the 3rd Battleship Squadron. In November 1941, she was recommissioned as a guard ship at Tuft's Cove, which lies at the entrance to Bedford Basin.

Venture served as such until 13 May 1943, when she lost her name to the former yacht Seaborn. The schooner was renamed Harbour Craft 190 and remained as such until sold on 10 December 1945 to a Halifax firm. Upon being sold she was renamed Alfred & Emily and initially served as a sealing vessel. The vessel eventually became a coal carrier, which she served as until she was lost in an explosion/fire off of Bellburns, Newfoundland on 3 October 1951.

== Sources ==
- Colledge, J. J.; Warlow, Ben (2006) [1969]. Ships of the Royal Navy: The Complete Record of All Fighting Ships of the Royal Navy from the 15th Century to the Present (3rd Rev ed.). London: Chatham Publishing. ISBN 978-1-86176-281-8. OCLC 67375475.
- Johnston, William; Rawling, William G.P.; Gimblett, Richard H.; MacFarlane, John (2010). The Seabound Coast: The Official History of the Royal Canadian Navy, 1867–1939. Vol. 1. Toronto: Dundurn Press. ISBN 978-1-55488-908-2.
- Macpherson, Ken; Barrie, Ron (2002). The Ships of Canada's Naval Forces 1910–2002. St. Catharines, Ontario: Vanwell Publishing. ISBN 1-55125-072-1.
- Tucker, Gilbert Norman (1952). The Naval Service of Canada, Its Official History – Volume 2: Activities on Shore During the Second World War. Ottawa: King's Printer. OCLC 4346983.
