= HMCS Giffard (K402) =

Modified Flower-class corvette

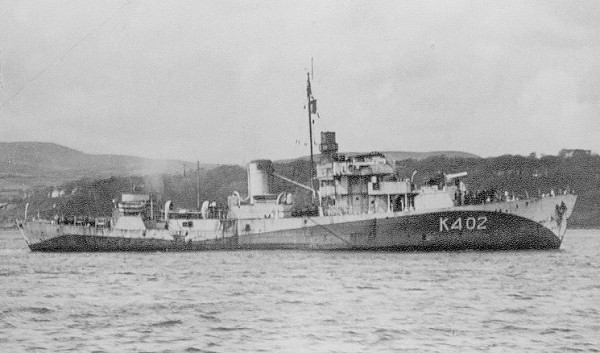
- HMCS Giffard

History

Canada
- Name: HMCS Giffard
- Namesake: Giffard, Quebec
- Ordered: 2 February 1942
- Builder: Alexander Hall & Co. Ltd. Aberdeen
- Laid down: 30 November 1942
- Launched: 19 June 1943
- Commissioned: 10 November 1943
- Decommissioned: 5 July 1945
- Identification: Pennant number: K402
- Honours and awards: Atlantic 1944
- Fate: Scrapped October 1952

General characteristics
- Class & type: Flower-class corvette (modified)
- Displacement: 1,015 long tons (1,031 t; 1,137 short tons)
- Length: 208 ft (63.40 m)o/a
- Beam: 33 ft (10.06 m)
- Draught: 11 ft (3.35 m)
- Propulsion: single shaft, 2 × oil fired water tube boilers, 1 triple-expansion reciprocating steam engine, 2,750 ihp (2,050 kW)
- Speed: 16 knots (29.6 km/h)
- Range: 3,500 nautical miles (6,482 km) at 12 knots (22.2 km/h)
- Complement: 90
- Sensors & processing systems: 1 × Type 271 SW2C radar; 1 × Type 144 sonar
- Armament: 1 × 4 in (102 mm) BL Mk.IX single gun; 1 × 2-pounder Mk.VIII single "pom-pom"; 2 × 20 mm Oerlikon single; 1 × Hedgehog A/S mortar; 4 × Mk.II depth charge throwers; 2 Depth charge rails with 70 depth charges

HMCS Giffard was a modified Flower-class corvette that served with the Royal Canadian Navy during the Second World War. She served primarily as a convoy escort in the Battle of the Atlantic. She was originally laid down by the British Royal Navy as HMS Buddleia but was never commissioned into the former, being transferred to the Royal Canadian Navy before completion. She is named for Giffard, Quebec, which at the time was a small village, but was eventually amalgamated into first, Beauport Quebec and then finally, Quebec City.

== Background ==
Flower-class corvettes like Giffard serving with the Royal Canadian Navy during the Second World War were different from earlier and more traditional sail-driven corvettes. The "corvette" designation was created by the French as a class of small warships; the Royal Navy borrowed the term for a period but discontinued its use in 1877. During the hurried preparations for war in the late 1930s, Winston Churchill reactivated the corvette class, needing a name for smaller ships used in an escort capacity, in this case based on a whaling ship design. The generic name "flower" was used to designate the class of these ships, which – in the Royal Navy – were named after flowering plants.

Corvettes commissioned by the Royal Canadian Navy during the Second World War were named after communities for the most part, to better represent the people who took part in building them. This idea was put forth by Admiral Percy W. Nelles. Sponsors were commonly associated with the community for which the ship was named. Royal Navy corvettes were designed as open sea escorts, while Canadian corvettes were developed for coastal auxiliary roles which was exemplified by their minesweeping gear. Eventually the Canadian corvettes would be modified to allow them to perform better on the open seas.

== Construction ==
Buddleia was ordered 2 February 1942 as part of the Royal Navy 1942–43 Increased Endurance Flower-class building program. She was laid down 30 November 1942 by Alexander Hall & Co. Ltd. at Aberdeen, Scotland and launched 19 June 1943. As part of an exchange for Algerine-class minesweepers that the RCN intended to use as convoy escorts, the Royal Navy transferred four Flower-class corvettes and twelve Castle-class corvettes to Canada in order to acquire them. Buddleia was transferred on 10 November 1943 and commissioned as HMCS Giffard into the RCN at Aberdeen. The only significant differences between the RCN and RN 1942–43 Flower classes was a shortened mainmast and varying anti-aircraft armament.

During her career, Giffard underwent one major refit. This took place at Liverpool, Nova Scotia which began in December 1944 and was completed in March 1945.

== Service history ==
After working up at Tobermory, Giffard joined the Mid-Ocean Escort Force as a trans-Atlantic convoy escort. She was assigned to escort group C-1 and escorted her first convoy in February 1944. In May 1944 she rescued 43 survivors of HMCS Valleyfield after the frigate had been torpedoed sunk about 50 miles south of Cape Race, Newfoundland and Labrador. She remained an ocean escort until 27 November 1944 when she departed for refit. After completing the refit and working up in Bermuda, Giffard was employed locally beginning April 1945 around St. John's until her departure with convoy HX 335 in mid-May. She returned to Canada for the final time in June 1945.

Giffard was paid off 5 July 1945 at Sorel, Quebec. She was transferred to the War Assets Corporation and sold for scrapping. She was broken up in October 1952 at Hamilton, Ontario by Steel Co of Canada.
