= HMCS Moose =

History
- Name: Cleopatra
- Builder: George Lawley & Sons, Neponset, Massachusetts
- Launched: 1930
- Fate: Sold to Royal Canadian Navy 1940

Canada
- Name: Moose
- Namesake: moose
- Acquired: 1940
- Commissioned: 8 September 1940
- Decommissioned: 20 July 1945
- Fate: Sold for private use 1946

History
- Name: Fraternité; Ottelia; Shogun; Naroma; Eretria; Candida A; Uthingo
- Status: In active service

General characteristics in Canadian service
- Type: Armed yacht
- Displacement: 263 long tons (267 t)
- Length: 130 ft (39.6 m)
- Beam: 22 ft (6.7 m)
- Draught: 9 ft (2.7 m)
- Speed: 12 knots (22 km/h; 14 mph)
- Sensors & processing systems: Asdic
- Armament: 1 × QF 12-pounder 12 cwt naval gun; Depth charges

HMCS Moose was an armed yacht of the Royal Canadian Navy during World War II. The vessel, originally the yacht Cleopatra constructed in 1930 in Massachusetts, was acquired for port defence in 1940. Following the war, Moose was sold into private ownership and reconverted to a pleasure yacht. Still in service, the vessel has been named Fraternité, Ottelia, Shogun, Naroma, Eretria, Candida A and as of 2019, Uthingo.

== Description ==
In Royal Canadian Navy (RCN) service, Moose had a displacement of 263 long tons (267 t), was 130 feet (39.6 m) long with a beam o f 22 feet (6.7 m) and a draught of 9 feet (2.7 m). They vessel had a maximum speed of 12 knots (22 km/h; 14 mph) and a complement of 5 officers and 35 ratings. The ship was armed with one QF 12-pounder 12 cwt naval gun forward and depth charge racks.

As of 2019, the yacht Uhtingo, which was refitted in 2001, is measured at 256 gross tonnage (GT) and 114 net tonnage (NT). The yacht is 133 feet 0 inches (40.54 m) long overall and 126 feet 4 inches (38.5 m) between perpendiculars with a 22 feet 1 inch (6.74 m) beam and a maximum draught of 10 feet 0 inches (3.05 m). The vessel is propelled by two propellers powered by two General Motors 16V 71N diesel engines rated at a combined 1,360 horsepower (1,010 kW) with a maximum speed of 15 knots (28 km/h; 17 mph) and a range of 3,500 nautical miles (6,500 km; 4,000 mi) at 11 knots (20 km/h; 13 mph). Uhtingo's deck is teak and the yacht requires a crew of 7 and has space for 11 guests.

== Service history ==
The yacht was constructed by George Lawley & Sons at their yard in Neponset, Massachusetts in 1930. Named Cleopatra, the vessel was ordered for A. C. Murphy of New York.

With the onset of World War II in 1939, the Royal Canadian Navy (RCN) intended to augment the local sea defences of coastal ports. The Royal Canadian Navy sought large, steel-hulled yachts to requisition. However, a significant lack of capable vessels were owned by Canadians. Canada turned to its southern neighbour for suitable ships, finding several that met the navy's requirements. However, US neutrality laws prevented their sale to belligerents in the war. In order to circumvent these laws, the RCN requisitioned the yachts of prominent Canadian yachtsmen and then sent them to the US to purchase the yachts that had been identified by the navy without the US government knowing they were working for the navy. The money to acquire the vessels was provided by the Canadian government through bank loans.

Ralph P. Bell was a shipping operator, owner of several offshore companies and past secretary of the Halifax Relief Commission along with being a member of the Royal Nova Scotia Yacht Club. Bell was among those selected by the RCN to be sent south to acquire new yachts. Bell was directed to purchase Cleopatra and dealt with yacht brokers in New York City to acquire the vessel.

The yacht sailed from Halifax, Nova Scotia on 3 June 1940 along with Otter for conversion to an armed yacht at Quebec City, Quebec. Conversion to an armed yacht involved removing most of the luxurious finery and installing naval hardware. On top of the installation of armament, Moose required further alterations, including the fitting of bilge keels to improve stability and modifying the stern, to accommodate the depth charge rails. The ship was commissioned into the RCN on 8 September at Quebec City and was then assigned to the Halifax Local Defence Force. Moose remained with this unit until May 1942, when the yacht was reassigned to Sydney, Nova Scotia. The main gun was removed due to a lack of surface threat for Allied merchant shipping in the region, but the depth charges were kept. In May 1943, Moose was taken off frontline service and sent to the training establishment HMCS Cornwallis and used as a training ship and examination vessel. Additionally, the armed yachts stationed at Cornwallis would escort the ferry Princess Helen on run between Saint John, New Brunswick and Digby, Nova Scotia after the sinking of the ferry Caribou.

Moose was paid off on 20 July 1945. In 1946, the ship was sold to Marine Industries Ltd. and was renamed Fraternité. The vessel was reconverted into a pleasure yacht for Joseph Simard, president of Marine Industries. In 1956, the ship was sold to W. E. Pennick of New Orleans, Louisiana and renamed Ottelia. Ottelia's ownership was then transferred to A. H. Schaupeter who utilised the yacht in the Gulf of Mexico until 1974. That year, Schaupeter sold the vessel to the Gibraltar firm, Green Seas. Ottelia was re-registered to Southampton, England and home ported in Monaco. The yacht, still in service, has seen several further ownership and name changes, including Shogun, Naroma, Eretria, Candida A and Uthingo.
