= USS Carpenter =

Gearing-class destroyer

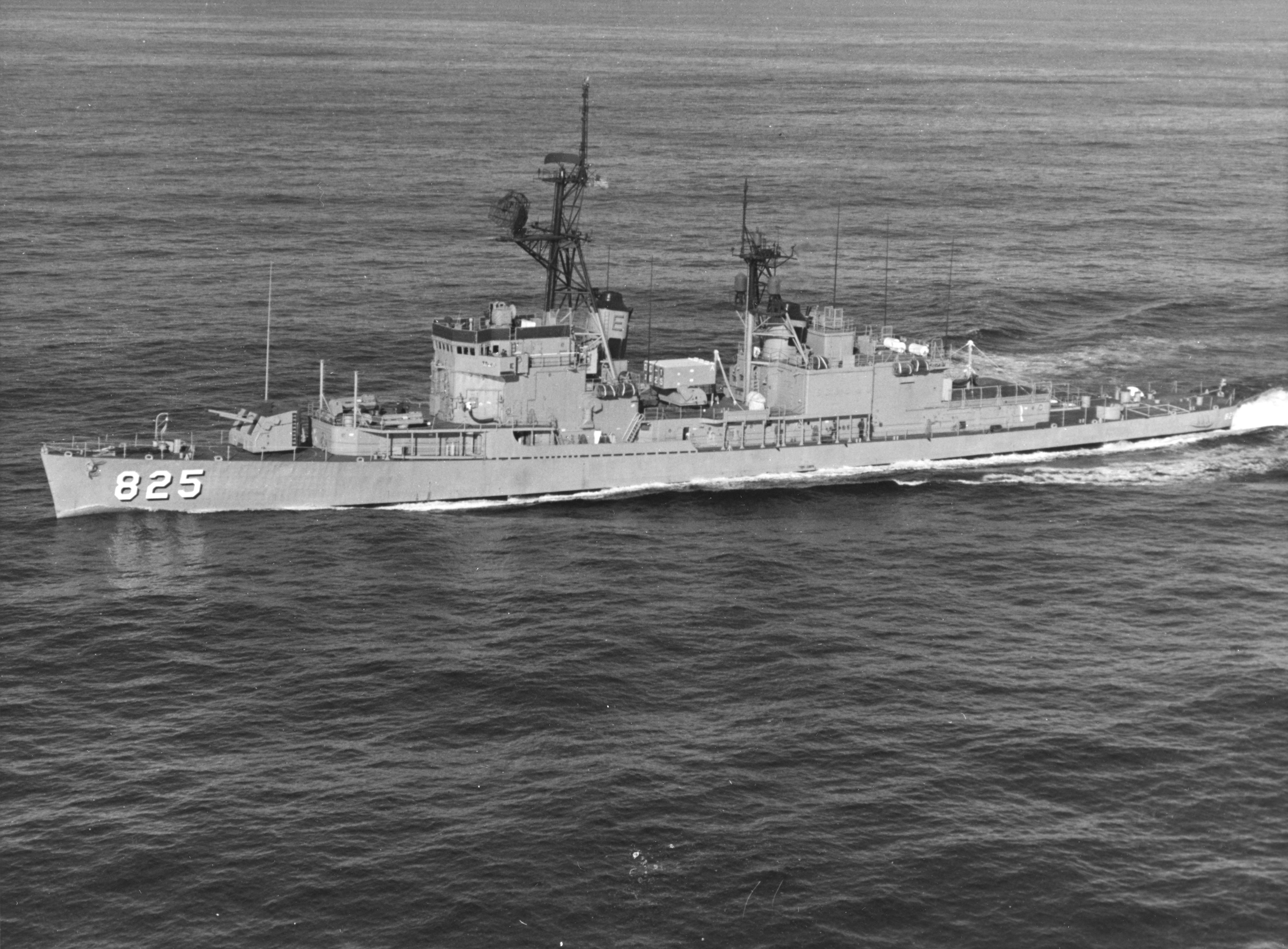
- USS Carpenter (DD-825) following her FRAM I refit in February 1976

History

United States
- Name: USS Carpenter
- Namesake: Donald M. Carpenter
- Builder: Consolidated Steel Corporation, Orange, Texas
- Laid down: 30 July 1945
- Launched: 30 December 1945
- Commissioned: 15 December 1949
- Decommissioned: 20 February 1981
- Stricken: 6 August 1987
- Identification: Callsign: NAYS; Hull number: DD-825
- Motto: Luku Mokoluu; (Hawaiian: "Killer of undersea boats")
- Honours and awards: 17 battle stars
- Fate: Leased to Turkey, 20 February 1981

Turkey
- Name: TCG Anittepe
- Namesake: Anittepe, part of Ankara, Turkey
- Acquired: Leased, 20 February 1981; Purchased, 8 June 1987
- Commissioned: 20 February 1981
- Decommissioned: November 1997
- Stricken: March 1998
- Identification: D-347
- Fate: Sold for scrap, 1999

General characteristics
- Class & type: Gearing-class destroyer
- Displacement: 3,460 long tons (3,516 t) full
- Length: 390 ft 6 in (119.02 m)
- Beam: 40 ft 10 in (12.45 m)
- Draft: 14 ft 4 in (4.37 m)
- Propulsion: Dual geared steam turbines, 2 shafts, 60,000 shp (44,742 kW)
- Speed: 35 knots (65 km/h; 40 mph)
- Range: 4,500 nautical miles (8,300 km) at 20 kn (37 km/h; 23 mph)
- Complement: 367
- Sensors & processing systems: 1 sonar & 3 radar (surface, air & gun fire control)
- Armament: 4 × standard 3 in (76 mm) guns; 2 × Weapon Alpha; 4 × 21 in (533 mm) torpedo tubes; Hedgehog anti-submarine mortar; 6 × depth charge projectors; 2 × depth charge tracks
- Armor: .5 in (13 mm) steel

USS Carpenter (DD/DDK/DDE-825) was a Gearing-class destroyer of the United States Navy, named for Lieutenant Commander Donald M. Carpenter (1894–1940).

== Construction and design ==
Carpenter was laid down on 30 July 1945 at Consolidated Steel Corporation, Orange, Texas; launched on 30 December 1945, and sponsored by Mrs. Donald M. Carpenter, widow of the ship's namesake. Work ceased on the ship, however, when the contract for her construction was cancelled on 30 January 1946, resumed on 21 February, but stopped again on 21 October when the hull was transferred to Algiers Naval Station, Louisiana. The US Navy had a need for advanced anti-submarine ships to develop tactics for use against fast submarines such as the German Type XXI submarine, as the Soviet Union was expected to soon build submarines of similar capability, so the chief of naval operations decided to complete four of the incomplete Gearings as experiential escorts – two of which, Carpenter and Robert A. Owens, would be advanced "submarine killers", to act as substitutes for large, purpose-built anti-submarine ships such as USS Norfolk, while two more, Epperson and Basilone, would be completed as simpler escort destroyers.

Carpenter was 390 feet 6 inches (119.02 m) long overall, with a beam of 40 feet 10 inches (12.45 m) and a draft of 19 feet (5.8 m). Displacement was 2,182 long tons (2,217 t) light, 2,500 long tons (2,500 t) standard and 2,550 long tons (2,590 t) full load. Two geared steam turbines rated at 60,000 shaft horsepower (45,000 kW) gave a speed of 32 knots (59 km/h; 37 mph). As completed, Carpenter's anti-submarine armament consisted of two Weapon Alpha anti-submarine rocket launchers, a trainable Hedgehog anti-submarine mortar, four torpedo tubes, and depth charges. Antiaircraft armament consisted of two twin 3-inch (76 mm) guns, initially 50 caliber guns and later 70 caliber Mark 26 guns.

=== Carpenter subclass ===
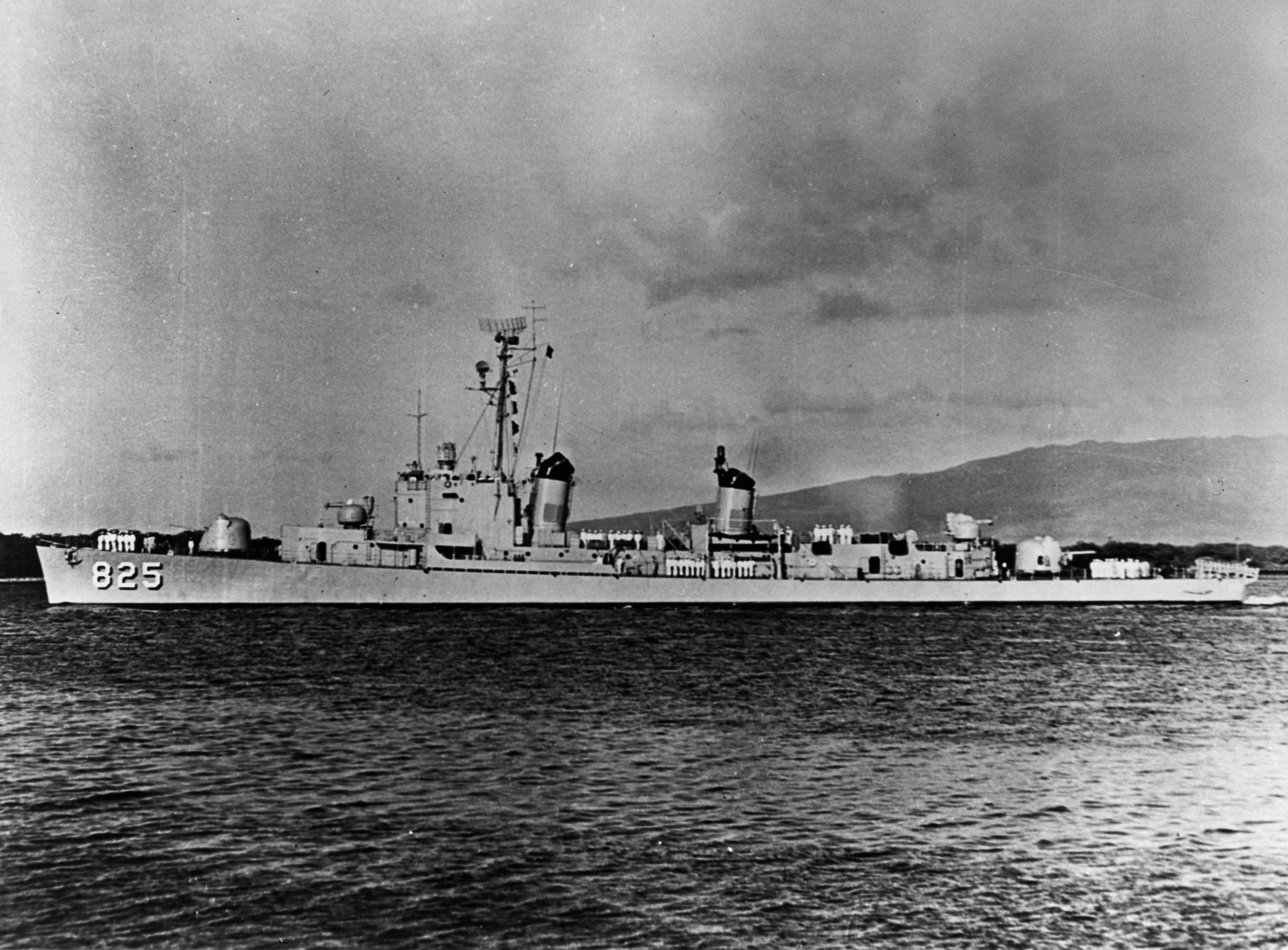
USS Carpenter in her original configuration, 1953

The Carpenter class, or more accurately the first ship of the DDK subclass of eight modified Gearing-class destroyers served as an interim substitute to the planned specialized "sub-killer cruisers" such as Norfolk, Carpenter's modifications emphasized electronic equipment and anti-submarine warfare weaponry over the standard destroyer anti-aircraft and torpedo armament. Designed to counter Soviet high-speed, snorkel-equipped, diesel submarines similar to the German World War II-era Type XXIs, Carpenter was equipped with a trainable Hedgehog mortar, two Weapon Alpha antisubmarine rocket launchers, antisubmarine torpedoes, and depth charges, in addition to torpedo countermeasure equipment, towed decoys and an improved sonar system.

== Service history ==
Towed to Newport News Shipbuilding and Dry Dock Company on 6 November 1947 for completion as a Carpenter-subclass hunter-killer antisubmarine destroyer (DDK), Carpenter was commissioned at the Norfolk Naval Shipyard, Virginia, on 15 December 1949. While Carpenter fitted out at Norfolk, the ship's designation was changed to DDE (escort destroyer) on 4 March 1950. Like her three sister ships, Basilone, Epperson, and Robert A. Owens, Carpenter conducted a shakedown cruise and intensive Anti-Submarine Warfare (ASW) training at Guantanamo Bay, Cuba, later that spring. On 26 June, the destroyer got underway for the Pacific Ocean, transited the Panama Canal on 1 July, and arrived at her new homeport, Pearl Harbor, Territory of Hawaii, on 13 July.

Despite the outbreak of war in Korea in June 1950, the emphasis of U.S. naval construction programs gravitated towards research platforms and the development of prototype systems rather than perfecting mass-production designs. Carpenter thus became a test bed for Norfolk, herself an experimental ASW warship, and was assigned to the anti-submarine hunter-killer force out of Pearl Harbor.

Carpenter began her first cruise to the Korean War zone on 4 February 1952, when she departed Pearl Harbor for duty in the Western Pacific. After arrival in Yokosuka, Japan, the destroyer conducted a hunter-killer training exercise off Okinawa before reporting to Task Force 77 (TF 77) on 3 March. Operating with the Fast Carrier Force, she spent the next month screening aircraft carriers and honing her ASW skills, missions interspersed with two trips to Wonsan harbor to pick up downed pilots for transportation back to the task force.

After completing a Formosa Straits patrol in April, Carpenter joined TF 95.1, the United Nations Blockading and Escort Force operating in the Yellow Sea. While attached to a carrier group, which included British, Australian, and Canadian warships, Carpenter screened the aircraft carriers during flight operations and carried out several shore bombardment missions, including one against Ch’o Do Island.

Returning to Pearl Harbor for a refit, the destroyer conducted a series of local training operations off Hawaii in July and August following the completion of those repairs and alterations. Then, in September, she departed for Eniwetok Atoll to participate in two atmospheric thermonuclear tests in Operation Ivy. During those evolutions, Carpenter conducted ASW patrols to keep Soviet submarines from observing the tests in between her duties as plane guard for the carrier Rendova, whose planes flew patrol and reconnaissance missions in the region. With both detonations complete by 16 November, Carpenter received her radiological clearance inspection and departed the next day, arriving at Pearl Harbor on 24 November.

=== 1953–1959 ===
Resuming local operations in Hawaii, she remained there until May 1953, when Carpenter steamed to the Far East for operations with TF 77. After rendezvous with light cruiser Manchester in early June, the destroyer proceeded to North Korea for a shore bombardment mission against gun positions in Hŭngnam harbor on 12 June. Although 12 rounds of 75 mm fire from shore batteries fell near Carpenter, she suffered neither hits nor casualties.

Following a tender availability in Sasebo, Japan, the destroyer spent the next month screening the fast carriers. After returning to Yokosuka for a short refit on 29 July, Carpenter departed 11 August for a Formosa patrol. This evolution included screen operations with the carrier Boxer and battleship New Jersey and radar tracking of numerous Chinese communist aircraft contacts. Returning to Kobe, Japan, on 6 September, the destroyer spent the next two months conducting ASW and screening operations in Korean waters.

Departing Yokosuka on 30 October, Carpenter sailed to Pearl Harbor for an extensive refit. Minor repairs, tactical drills, and crew training occupied the ship until the summer of 1954, when she returned to the Western Pacific. In September, during the Quemoy and Matsu crisis between Communist China and the Nationalists on Formosa, Carpenter patrolled the Taiwan Straits for 13 tense days before the crisis passed. The destroyer remained in the region for the next three months, screening Boxer, conducting various hunter-killer ASW exercises, and patrolling the Formosa Straits. In January 1955, in line with the mutual defense treaty between Taiwan and the United States, Carpenter helped convoy Nationalist forces as they evacuated the Tachen Islands.

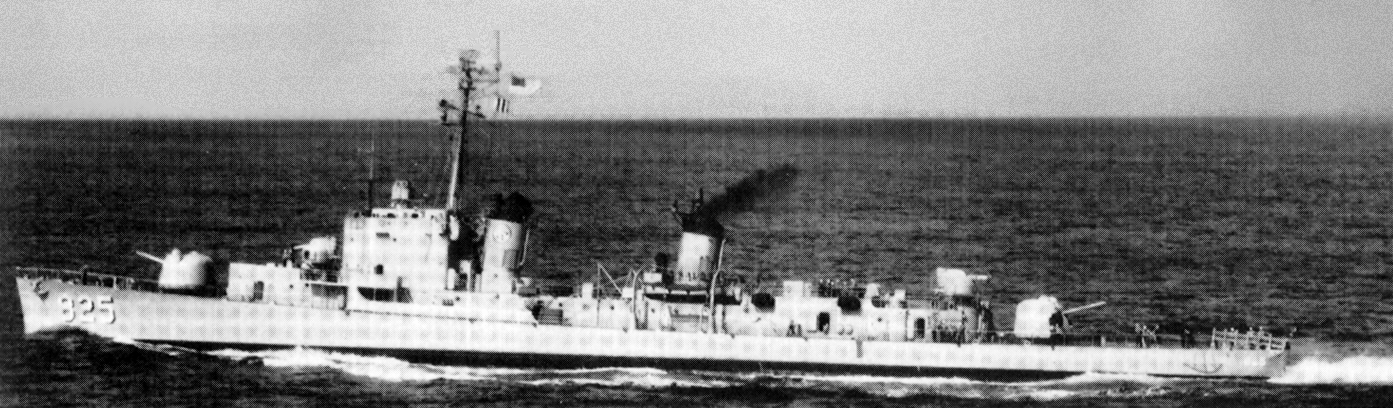
USS Carpenter in 1957

After returning to Hawaii that spring, Carpenter resumed her regular routine of local operations and ASW exercises out of Pearl Harbor. Her fourth cruise began on 4 January 1956, when the destroyer set sail for the Western Pacific. Operating out of Yokosuka, the destroyer conducted extensive ASW training with ships of the 7th Fleet, visited ports in the Philippines and Hong Kong, and operated with units of the Royal Australian Navy.

Returning to Pearl Harbor on 9 June, the destroyer underwent an extensive overhaul, followed by the now familiar pattern of local operations, crew training, and constant ASW exercises. In a change of pace the following spring, Carpenter departed Hawaii on 15 March 1957 for a series of goodwill port visits throughout the South Pacific. The destroyer stopped at American Samoa, Manus in the Admiralty Islands, and Sydney, Australia, before returning to Hawaii on 28 August. Later that fall, Carpenter underwent an overhaul and received two of the new 3-inch/70 "quick-firing" antiaircraft gun mounts for testing and evaluation.

The destroyer continued this pattern of deployments for the next three years: local operations out of Pearl Harbor followed by a deployment and operations with a hunter-killer ASW group out of Japan, and then return for repairs. Her sixth Far East deployment lasted from April to September 1958, followed by training and an overhaul until March 1959. Six weeks underway training followed before another deployment in July, during which Carpenter operated in a hunter-killer ASW with the carriers Hornet and Kearsarge, before returning home in December.

=== 1960–1964 ===
In light of concerns over the threat posed by nuclear-powered Soviet submarines, Carpenter spent much of the spring of 1960 conducting ASW training and practicing aircraft carrier screening. During those evolutions, she operated with such carriers as Yorktown, Hancock, and Ranger. Later in June, the warship operated in a plane guard role during Operation Cosmos – President Dwight D. Eisenhower's trip to the Far East – before conducting a six-week midshipman cruise ending on 26 July. Following a month-long tender availability alongside the destroyer tender Bryce Canyon, the destroyer spent much of September in dry dock for hull repairs.

Departing on 17 October for her eighth Far East tour, Carpenter joined 7th Fleet's hunter-killer ASW group and conducted operations with Hornet, Hancock, and Bennington. Later that winter, as North Vietnamese and Pathet Lao troops attempted to overthrow the pro-Western Royal Laotian government, Carpenter deployed as part of the multi-carrier task force sent to the South China Sea to deter further Communist guerrilla attacks on pro-American forces in Laos.

Following her return to Pearl Harbor on 26 April 1961, Carpenter entered Pearl Harbor Naval Shipyard on 22 May for ASW modernization. Emerging from the yard in August with a new helicopter flight deck and a side-scanning AN/SQS-26 sonar to improve her submarine detection capabilities, she spent the rest of the year conducting refresher training and local operations designed to test her newly installed equipment.

On 29 January 1962, Carpenter commenced exercise "Prairie Wolf" with diesel submarines Tang and Gudgeon. This evolution tested the destroyer's sonar tracking abilities and ASW rocket weapons system. Other exercises over the next several months included electronic countermeasures, gunnery, sonar, and radar calibration tests, as well as practice ASW torpedo shots. The routine was broken only by occasional plane-guard operations with Hancock, an evaluation of her SQS-32 sonar capabilities against the nuclear-powered submarine Seadragon, and on 20 February, service as contingency recovery ship during John Glenn's Mercury Friendship 7 orbital flight.

Following a dual-ship "hold down" exercise by Carpenter and Sproston against the conventionally powered submarine Bashaw on 23 May, the destroyer moved back to Pearl Harbor for three weeks of repairs alongside Bryce Canyon. She then conducted more ASW exercises, helicopter replenishment, and plane-guard training in preparation for another 7th Fleet deployment. During one ASW exercise, Carpenter forced Tiru to surface owing to battery drain. On 29 June, the destroyer's hull designation was changed to DD-825.

Departing Hawaii on 2 July 1962, the destroyer arrived at Yokosuka 10 days later. After a short period alongside the destroyer tender Dixie, she began ASW exercises and screening operations for Hornet. Several barrier patrol exercises, including one with Japan Maritime Self-Defense Force destroyers Takanami and Ōnami, lasted through September. Other evolutions included torpedo-firing exercises, electronic intercept tracking, and plane-guard services in the Sea of Japan. In October, Carpenter conducted a convoy-protection exercise off Okinawa, encountering several shadowing Soviet whaling ships in the process. She then visited Sasebo, Hong Kong and Subic Bay before returning to Hawaii, reaching Pearl Harbor on 17 December.

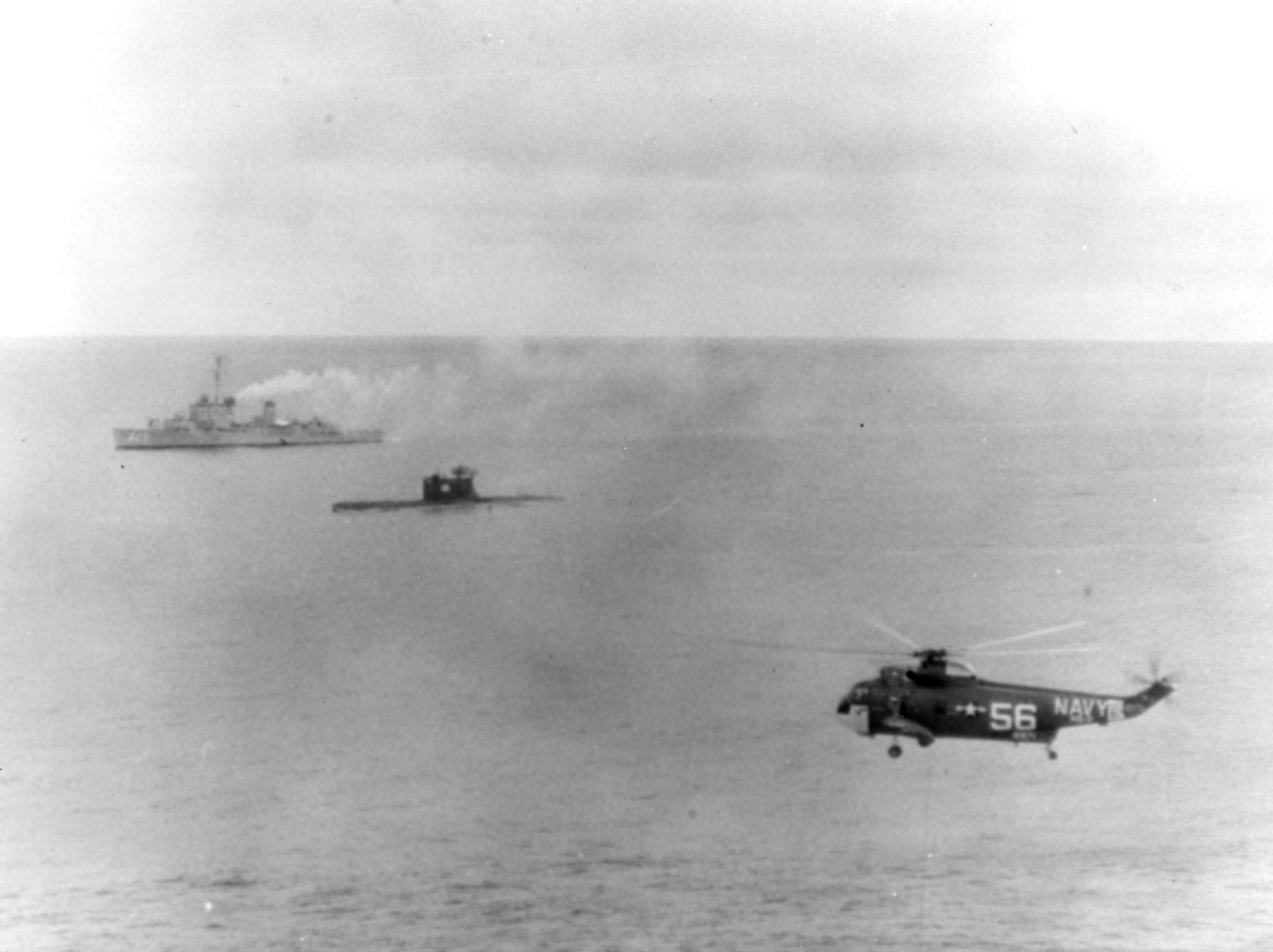
Carpenter with a Soviet submarine in the Sea of Japan, 6 January 1964

Starting in January 1963, the destroyer conducted numerous training exercises off Hawaii, including submarine target services and a training mission with Canadian frigates HMCS Beacon Hill and Jonquiere. In April, during a convoy exercise, the destroyer's simulated attacks "sank" Pickerel and Carbonero. On 11 July, Carpenter steamed south for a short training cruise to American Samoa, visiting Pago Pago, Tutuila, for three days before returning to Pearl Harbor. In August, the warship participated in fleet exercises, culminating in a convoy screen mission during which helicopters, surface ships, and Drone Anti-Submarine Helicopter (DASH) drones all dropped exercise torpedoes on "attacking" submarines. On 10 August Carpenter was declared "out of action" following a simulated Regulus cruise missile attack guided in by Medregal.

The destroyer departed on her next Far East cruise on 12 November 1963, when she got underway in company with Hornet and Frank E. Evans. Arriving in Japan on 22 November, the warship received services from Dixie, before commencing a 7th Fleet "active environment" transit exercise with Hornet in the Sea of Japan. On 4 January 1964, the task force provoked the expected reconnaissance response from Soviet forces out of Vladivostok – numerous overflights by Tu-16 "Badger" aircraft and the appearance of a Kotlin-class destroyer. Aside from a short excursion to investigate a surfaced Soviet Whiskey-class submarine, Carpenter screened Hornet until the task group steamed to Kobe on 10 January. In addition to plane-guard services and ASW training conducted that spring, the destroyer also carried out three Formosa Strait patrols. She returned to Pearl Harbor in late April to begin preparations for a fleet rehabilitation and modernization conversion.

=== 1964–1967 ===
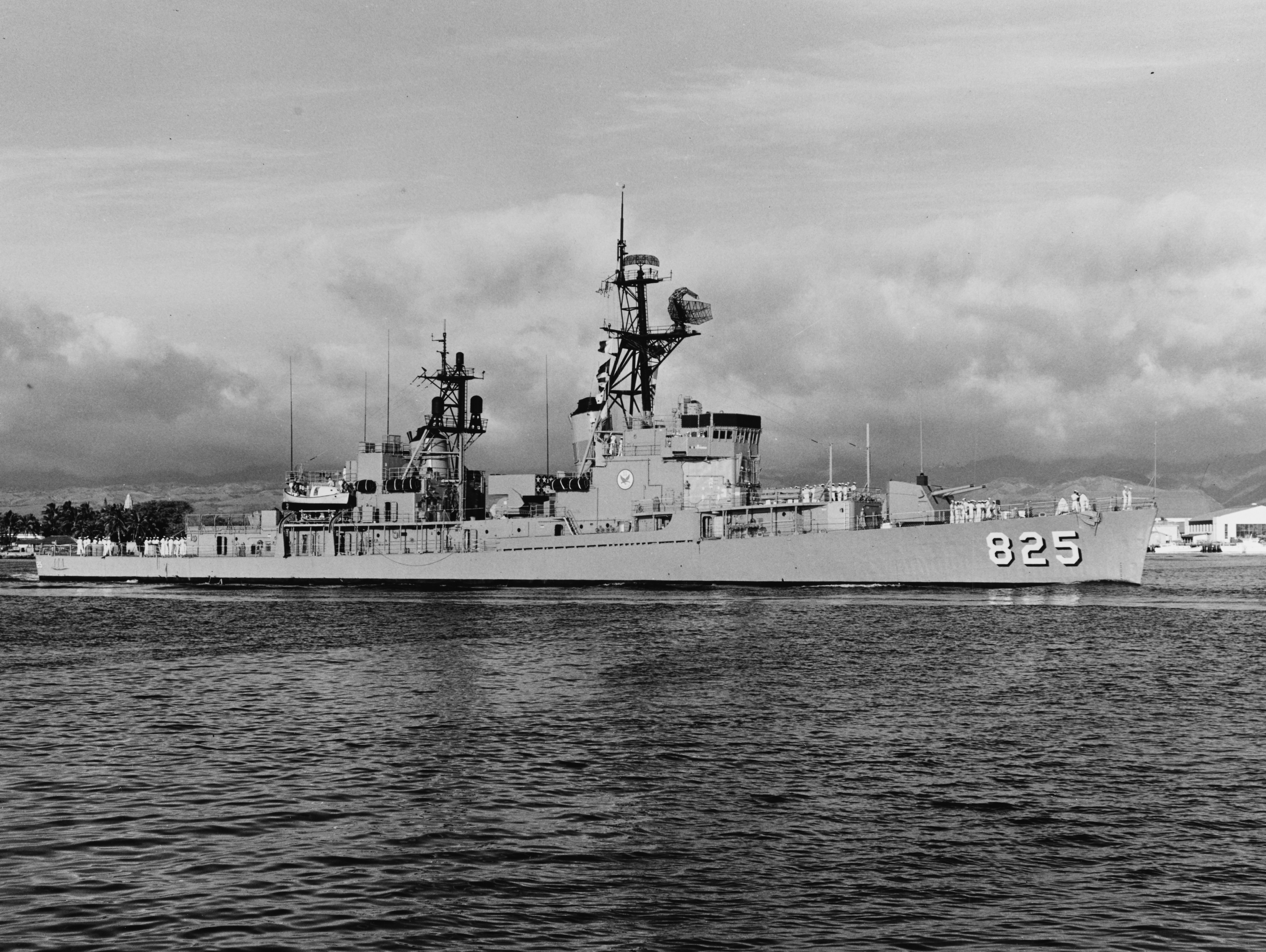
USS Carpenter after her FRAM I refit, 1965

This major overhaul was intended to extend a warships' service life and improve sensor and weapon systems. Begun on 28 May, Carpenter received drone antisubmarine helicopter (DASH) support equipment, antisubmarine rocket (ASROC) weapons, and since the 3-inch/70s had proved a maintenance disaster, a dual 5-inch/38 mount forward. Communication, radar, and sonar upgrades were installed along with general equipment improvements and a helicopter refueling system.

Carpenter began sea trials and equipment tests on 26 March 1965 before moving out of the shipyard on 1 July. Assigned to Destroyer Division 112 the next day, the destroyer spent the next six months carrying out refresher training and other evolutions in preparation for a Vietnam deployment. These drills included firing an exercise ASROC torpedo at the impact-rigged Blueback in August and surface ship exercises with New Zealand frigate HMNZS Taranaki later in the fall.

Carpenter departed Hawaii on 27 December, and after a short stop to refuel at Subic Bay, joined TG 77.4 for carrier screening operations on 12 January 1966. After six weeks of plane-guard duty, Carpenter shifted to the search and rescue station in the Gulf of Tonkin in early March. On 20 March, the destroyer began a two-day surveillance mission of the Communist Chinese-held Paracel Islands before returning to Yokosuka on the 26th. Carpenter returned to the Gulf of Tonkin in mid-April for a few days of patrol and screen duties before she steamed to the gun line off the coast of Vietnam on 21 April. Over the next week, she fired a total of 318 5-inch rounds at enemy caves and bunkers in support of the United States Army amphibious landing in Operation AUSTIN II. Following visits to Subic Bay and Hong Kong, the warship returned to Hawaii, arriving there on 11 June.

On 25 July, Carpenter began DASH qualification trials, and although one drone malfunctioned and crashed at sea, the DASH control team successfully dropped three exercise torpedoes during evolutions in August. This training was interrupted on 28 July when the destroyer was asked to intercept two Soviet guided missile destroyers approaching Hawaii. The crew then spent the next two days collecting electronic emission data and other useful intelligence regarding Soviet warships before returning to more mundane duties.

In November, the destroyer began receiving services from Prairie (AD-15) in preparation for a restricted availability, which commenced 14 December, during which Carpenter received rudder repairs and new four-bladed screws. With yard work complete by 12 January 1967, the destroyer resumed a fast-paced training regimen – including gunnery qualifications, antiaircraft drills, combat air patrol control, AN/SQS-26 sonar evaluation, and DASH operations – in preparation for her next deployment.

Departing Pearl Harbor on 6 March, Carpenter ultimately reached "Yankee Station" off Vietnam three weeks later. Familiar plane-guard duties, punctuated only by the occasional sonar, helicopter, and DASH exercise with friendly submarines filled her first two weeks on station. On 14 April, Carpenter became the surveillance operations ship for the task force, coordinating and tracking all surface and subsurface contacts for the task force on "Yankee Station". On 29 April, the destroyer stood into Subic Bay for a week of maintenance and minor repairs.

After two more weeks on "Yankee Station", Carpenter proceeded north to Kaohsiung for joint sea-air training with the Taiwanese navy, arriving there on 23 May. Returning to the South China Sea on 9 June, the destroyer conducted a brief surveillance pass of the Paracels before returning to "Yankee Station" on 12 June. Following a port visit to Hong Kong in the first week of July, Carpenter continued screen operations until 22 July, when the destroyer received orders to the gun line off Vietnam. Over the next week, Carpenter carried out 14 different fire missions against targets ashore, expending 1,012 rounds of 5-inch ammunition in support of the Army of the Republic of Vietnam 17th Division in the II Corps area.

Sailing to Subic Bay on 1 August, the destroyer joined Sproston and sailed south for exercises with the New Zealand Navy on 4 August. Carpenter "crossed the line" on 8 August, where according to her historian, "the equator was not visible due to the high tide." The ships reached Sydney on 15 August for a two-day port visit before proceeding on to New Zealand. Once there, the warships conducted several ASW exercises before visiting Auckland and Wellington. Departing 1 September, Carpenter steamed to Pearl Harbor via Pago Pago, reaching home on 11 September.

=== 1967–1969 ===
The destroyer quickly settled into the by now familiar cycle of training and upkeep. The only break came in the second week of November, when she served as an alternate recovery ship during the Apollo 4 unmanned capsule flight test. Unfortunately, the crash and loss of a DASH drone marred an otherwise uneventful mission. Misfortune dogged Carpenter when another drone crashed on 10 January 1968. Despite those mishaps, however, the ship passed all her inspections early in the year and resumed local operations in March. Departing Pearl Harbor on 29 March, the destroyer proceeded north of Midway on a secondary recovery station for another unmanned capsule flight. On 4 April, Carpenter's radar tracked the Apollo 6 capsule as it passed nearly overhead on a trajectory to a safe splashdown near Bennington.

In mid-April, the destroyer underwent a tender availability alongside Isle Royale during which the DASH system was removed. Although unmanned aerial vehicles would return to warships in the future, the DASH system's immature technology proved too unreliable for continued operation. Carpenter spent the next few months conducting refresher training in preparation for a major fleet exercise that summer. Underway for San Diego, California, and STRIKEX 1–68 on 14 June, Carpenter carried out shore bombardment, anti-surface and anti-cruise missile operations in the waters off Southern California until 2 July. She then steamed to Santa Monica, California, for a port visit before returning to Pearl Harbor. Following a series of pre-deployment tests and inspections, and a tender availability alongside Bryce Canyon, Carpenter received upgrades to her radar fire-control systems in preparation for her next Vietnam tour. After testing the new equipment in early September, Carpenter got underway for another Far East deployment on 17 September. Arriving on "Yankee Station" on 7 October, she conducted plane-guard and screen operations for assigned carriers. Aside from a short port visit to Hong Kong in late October, she remained there for the next two months, and was present when air strikes against North Vietnam were terminated on 1 November. Detached for two weeks on 13 December, Carpenter patrolled the waters south of Da Nang in support of coastal interdiction efforts as part of Operation Market Time. The warship also provided gunfire support for friendly riverine forces south of Chu Lai. Other than a period of Soviet trawler surveillance between 30 January and 2 February 1969, Carpenter remained on "Yankee Station" until 11 February, when she steamed to Subic Bay for refueling and upkeep. Departing that same day, the warship sailed for home and moored at Pearl Harbor on 1 March.

=== 1969–1972 ===
The destroyer's usual post-deployment routine of inspections, maintenance, and training lasted through the summer, ending with Carpenter entering Pearl Harbor Naval Shipyard for a major overhaul on 13 October. With that yard work complete on 13 February 1970, the destroyer spent the next three months conducting equipment tests, readiness evaluations, and crew training. After a final series of inspections, she got underway for the South China Sea on 3 June.

Arriving on the still-busy "Yankee Station" on 1 July, Carpenter provided plane-guard services to a variety of carriers, including Bon Homme Richard, America, and Shangri-La. In mid-August, she proceeded north to Yokosuka for ten days of upkeep alongside the repair ship Hector. She then commenced three weeks of Taiwan Straits picket duties. Relieved on 22 September, Carpenter returned to "Yankee Station" to provide screen and plane-guard services. In preparation for a port visit to Sydney, the warship sailed to Subic Bay for upkeep on 5 November. While there, workmen discovered cracks in the destroyer's fuel tanks and the ship was diverted to Pearl Harbor for repairs. Arriving on 25 November, the ship moored alongside Bryce Canyon and the offending compartments were repaired by 15 January 1971.

Carpenter conducted several major training exercises that spring, including ASW exercises with guided missile destroyer Cochrane and submarines Bonefish and Sailfish in January, Apollo recovery ship training in February, and exercise torpedo firings at Aspro on 31 March and Plunger on 30 April. This training regimen ended on 4 June, when the destroyer sailed to Oregon for the Portland Rose Festival. Returning to Pearl Harbor on 20 June, Carpenter resumed underway training in preparation for her next deployment. That commenced on 9 September, when the destroyer got underway for the Far East.

After an ASW exercise with Scamp south of Manila Bay, Carpenter arrived at Subic Bay on 24 September to have her ECM antenna repaired. Departing four days later, she took up a screen position on "Yankee Station" and provided plane-guard services for Midway until 11 October. While steaming towards Subic Bay that day, the crew discovered several leaks in the ship's hull. Moving immediately into dry dock AFDM-6 at Subic Bay, the rusted plating was repaired by work crews and Carpenter returned to "Yankee Station" on 5 November. She then provided plane-guard services to Oriskany, Coral Sea, and Constellation through January 1972. Departing the area on 15 February, the destroyer arrived at Pearl Harbor on 9 March.

=== 1972–1975 ===
After a period of leave and upkeep, the destroyer moved into Pearl Harbor Naval Shipyard on 5 April for minor hull repairs. The deterioration proved too severe to fully repair in Hawaii, however, and the warship proceeded to Hunter's Point Naval Shipyard at San Francisco, on 22 September for major repairs and an overhaul. With repairs complete on 31 January 1973, the warship moved out of dry dock and officially shifted her homeport to San Francisco. Carpenter was also assigned to the Naval Reserve training force, vice the active fleet. After settling into her new assignment, the destroyer began training evolutions in preparation for a reserve-training cruise to the Western Pacific.

Departing 12 June, the destroyer joined Wiltsie, Southerland, and McKean at Seattle, Washington, and sailed north to Alaska. Following a brief stop to refuel at Adak, the squadron reached Yokosuka on 28 June. There, the destroyers participated in ASWEX 7–73 in July, a joint exercise with four Japanese destroyers and the submarine Harushio. After a port visit to Sasebo, the warships moved on to Formosa and participated in exercise "Shark Hunt III" with Taiwanese Navy destroyers. After liberty and upkeep, the destroyer group departed Taiwan on 8 August, and following fuels stops at Guam, Midway, and Pearl Harbor, arrived at San Francisco on 30 August.

Owing to major budget shortfalls in the Department of the Navy, Carpenter's reduced crew conducted only local operations through 1974 and into 1975. Her training that year focused on exercises designed to increase the readiness of nucleus and reserve crews. These were mainly short underway assignments, such as plane-guard assignments, replenishment training, and test dive-escort services for nuclear submarines Thomas Jefferson and Seawolf. The warship also carried out a vigorous public-affairs program during port visits up and down the West Coast.

=== 1976–1980 ===
This pattern of operations continued until 27 September 1976, when the destroyer began an overhaul at Bethlehem Steel shipyard in San Francisco. Completed on 26 August 1977, the aging destroyer had received major repairs to her main propulsion plant and combat-system upgrades. Returning to reserve operations, Carpenter spent the next three years conducting local operations interspersed with longer training cruises. During one of these local trips, she appeared briefly in the helicopter landing sequence in the movie, 'Raise The Titanic', along with several other Navy vessels. The latter training trips included voyages to Ensenada, Mexico, and Anchorage, Alaska.

In December 1979, Carpenter participated in the filming of the motion picture Raise the Titanic based on the novel authored by Clive Cussler.

Carpenter's last underway period took place in May and June 1980, during which she provided plane-guard services for Ranger and conducted an ASW exercise with McKean and Bonefish. Upon her return, the crew began preparations to turn over the ship to the Republic of Turkey as part of the Security Assistance Program.

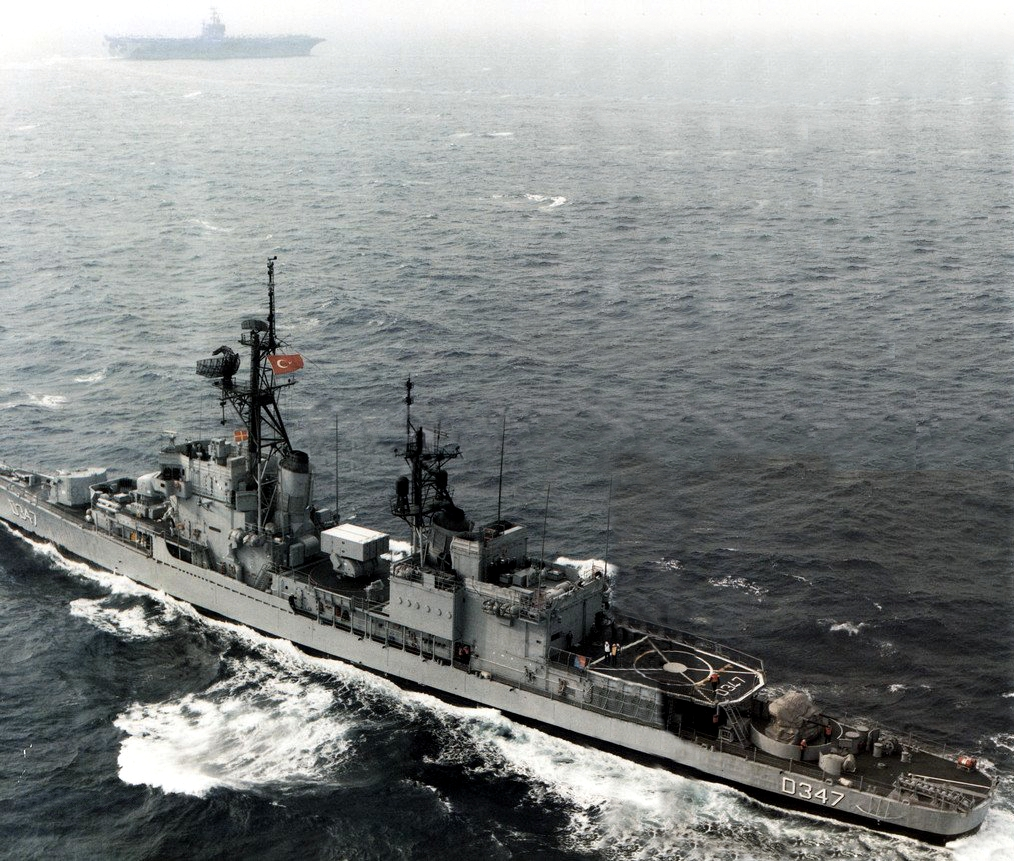
Anıttepe underway in the Mediterranean Sea, 1988

== TCG Anittepe (D-347) ==
Decommissioned on 20 February 1981, Carpenter was leased to the Republic of Turkey that same day. Renamed TCG Anittepe (D-347), the destroyer was purchased outright on 8 June 1987 and served in the Turkish Navy through the 1990s. After her second career, she was retired in November 1997, completing over 52 years of service. She was broken up for scrap in 1999.
