= HMCS La Hulloise =

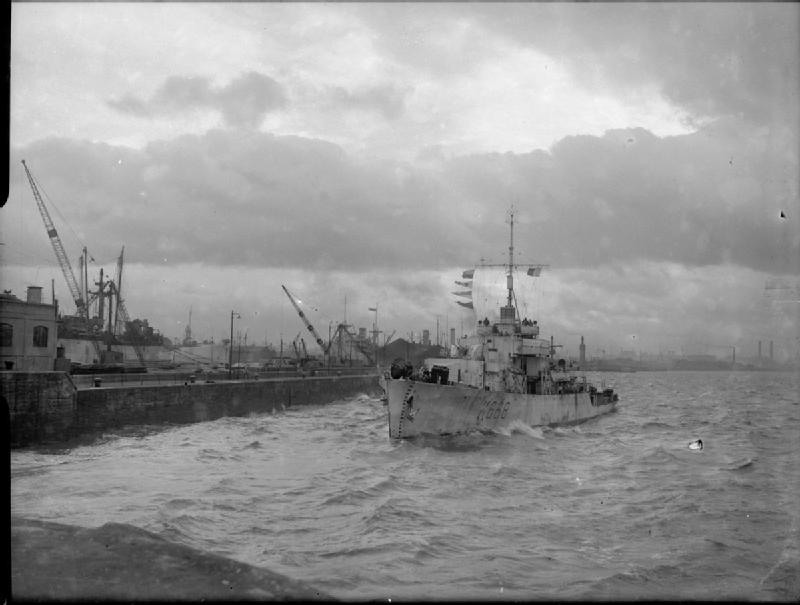
- HMCS La Hulloise entering Gladstone Dock, Liverpool.

History

Canada
- Name: La Hulloise
- Namesake: Hull, Quebec
- Ordered: October 1941
- Builder: Canadian Vickers, Montreal
- Laid down: 10 August 1943
- Launched: 29 October 1943
- Commissioned: 20 May 1944
- Decommissioned: 6 December 1945
- Identification: Pennant number: K 668
- Recommissioned: 9 October 1957
- Decommissioned: 16 July 1965
- Reclassified: Prestonian-class frigate 1957
- Identification: pennant number: FFE 305
- Motto: "Soyons coeur franc" (Let us be true of heart)
- Honours and awards: Atlantic 1945; North Sea 1945
- Fate: Scrapped 1966
- Badge: Barry wavy of twelve, argent and azure, a lozenge of the second fimbriated or, charged with three maple leaves vert, edged and veined argent, conjoined to a single stem of the last, the stem enfiled with a coronet or.

General characteristics
- Class & type: River-class frigate
- Displacement: 1,445 long tons (1,468 t; 1,618 short tons); 2,110 long tons (2,140 t; 2,360 short tons) (deep load)
- Length: 283 ft (86.26 m) p/p; 301.25 ft (91.82 m)o/a
- Beam: 36.5 ft (11.13 m)
- Draught: 9 ft (2.74 m); 13 ft (3.96 m) (deep load)
- Propulsion: 2 x Admiralty 3-drum boilers, 2 shafts, reciprocating vertical triple expansion, 5,500 ihp (4,100 kW)
- Speed: 20 knots (37.0 km/h); 20.5 knots (38.0 km/h) (turbine ships)
- Range: 646 long tons (656 t; 724 short tons) oil fuel; 7,500 nautical miles (13,890 km) at 15 knots (27.8 km/h)
- Complement: 157
- Armament: 2 × QF 4 in (102 mm)/45 Mk. XVI on twin mount HA/LA Mk.XIX; 1 × QF 12 pdr (3 in (76 mm)) 12 cwt /40 Mk. V on mounting HA/LA Mk.IX (not all ships); 8 × 20 mm QF Oerlikon A/A on twin mounts Mk.V; 1 × Hedgehog 24 spigot A/S projector; up to 150 depth charges

HMCS La Hulloise was a River-class frigate that served with the Royal Canadian Navy during the Second World War and again as a training ship and Prestonian-class frigate from 1957–1965. She was named for Hull, Quebec, but due to possible confusion with USS Hull, her name was altered.

La Hulloise was ordered in October 1941 as part of the 1942–1943 River-class building program. She was laid down on 10 August 1943 by Canadian Vickers Ltd. at Montreal, Quebec and launched 29 October 1943. She was commissioned 20 May 1944 at Montreal with the pennant K 668.

== Background ==
The River-class frigate was designed by William Reed of Smith's Dock Company of South Bank-on-Tees. Originally called a "twin-screw corvette", its purpose was to improve on the convoy escort classes in service with the Royal Navy at the time, including the Flower-class corvette. The first orders were placed by the Royal Navy in 1940 and the vessels were named for rivers in the United Kingdom, giving name to the class. In Canada they were named for towns and cities though they kept the same designation. The name "frigate" was suggested by Vice-Admiral Percy Nelles of the Royal Canadian Navy and was adopted later that year.

Improvements over the corvette design included improved accommodation which was markedly better. The twin engines gave only three more knots of speed but extended the range of the ship to nearly double that of a corvette at 7,200 nautical miles (13,300 km) at 12 knots. Among other lessons applied to the design was an armament package better designed to combat U-boats including a twin 4-inch mount forward and 12-pounder aft. 15 Canadian frigates were initially fitted with a single 4-inch gun forward but with the exception of HMCS Valleyfield, they were all eventually upgraded to the double mount. For underwater targets, the River-class frigate was equipped with a Hedgehog anti-submarine mortar and depth charge rails aft and four side-mounted throwers.

River-class frigates were the first Royal Canadian Navy warships to carry the 147B Sword horizontal fan echo sonar transmitter in addition to the irregular ASDIC. This allowed the ship to maintain contact with targets even while firing unless a target was struck. Improved radar and direction-finding equipment improved the RCN's ability to find and track enemy submarines over the previous classes.

Canada originally ordered the construction of 33 frigates in October 1941. The design was too big for the shipyards on the Great Lakes so all the frigates built in Canada were built in dockyards along the west coast or along the St. Lawrence River. In all Canada ordered the construction of 60 frigates including ten for the Royal Navy that transferred two to the United States Navy.

== Service history ==
After working up in Bermuda, La Hulloise was assigned to convoy escort group EG 16 out of Halifax. In October 1944 she was reassigned to EG 25 which was based out of the United Kingdom working from Derry and Rosyth. To counter snorkel-equipped U-boats in British coastal waters beginning in mid-December 1944, escort groups began to operate in overlapping patrols. Escort Group 25 comprising Orkney as Senior Officer's Ship, La Hulloise, Ste. Therese andThetford Mines and Joliette were sent to patrol in the Shetland-Faroes narrows, off Hebrides, in the Irish Sea west of Ireland and in St. George's Channel. On 7 March 1945, La Hulloise took part alongside Strathadam and Thetford Mines, in the sinking of U-1302 in St George's Channel. On 20 March 1945 U-1003 collided underwater with New Glasgow of EG 26. Strathadam, La Hulloise and Thetford Mines of EG 25 were added to the search for the sub, of which Thetford Mines found survivors of the U-boat which had been scuttled on 23 March. In May 1945, La Hulloise departed the UK for a tropicalization refit at Saint John, which was completed 19 October 1945. However the war had ended and she was paid off on 6 December 1945 and placed in reserve.

=== Postwar service ===
On 24 June 1949, La Hulloise was recommissioned as the accommodation ship at Halifax for Royal Navy personnel and the reserve fleet. In May 1951, Crescent, La Hulloise and Swansea sailed to the United Kingdom on a training cruise. In May 1952, with Crescent and Swansea, the frigate made a training cruise to Gibraltar and the French Riviera. In August, La Hulloise and Crescent returned to Europe on a training cruise, with the frigate joining Magnificent in November when the aircraft carrier sailed to Norfolk, Virginia to embark Sea Furies. In December 1952, she and Crescent visited Cuba while training in the Caribbean Sea. She attended the Queen Elizabeth II Coronation Fleet Review at Spithead on 15 June 1953. She remained a training ship until she was decommissioned in February 1953 in preparation for her conversion to a Prestonian-class frigate. This meant a flush-decked appearance aft, with a larger bridge and taller funnel. Her hull forward was strengthened against ice and the quarterdeck was enclosed to contain two Squid anti-submarine mortars.

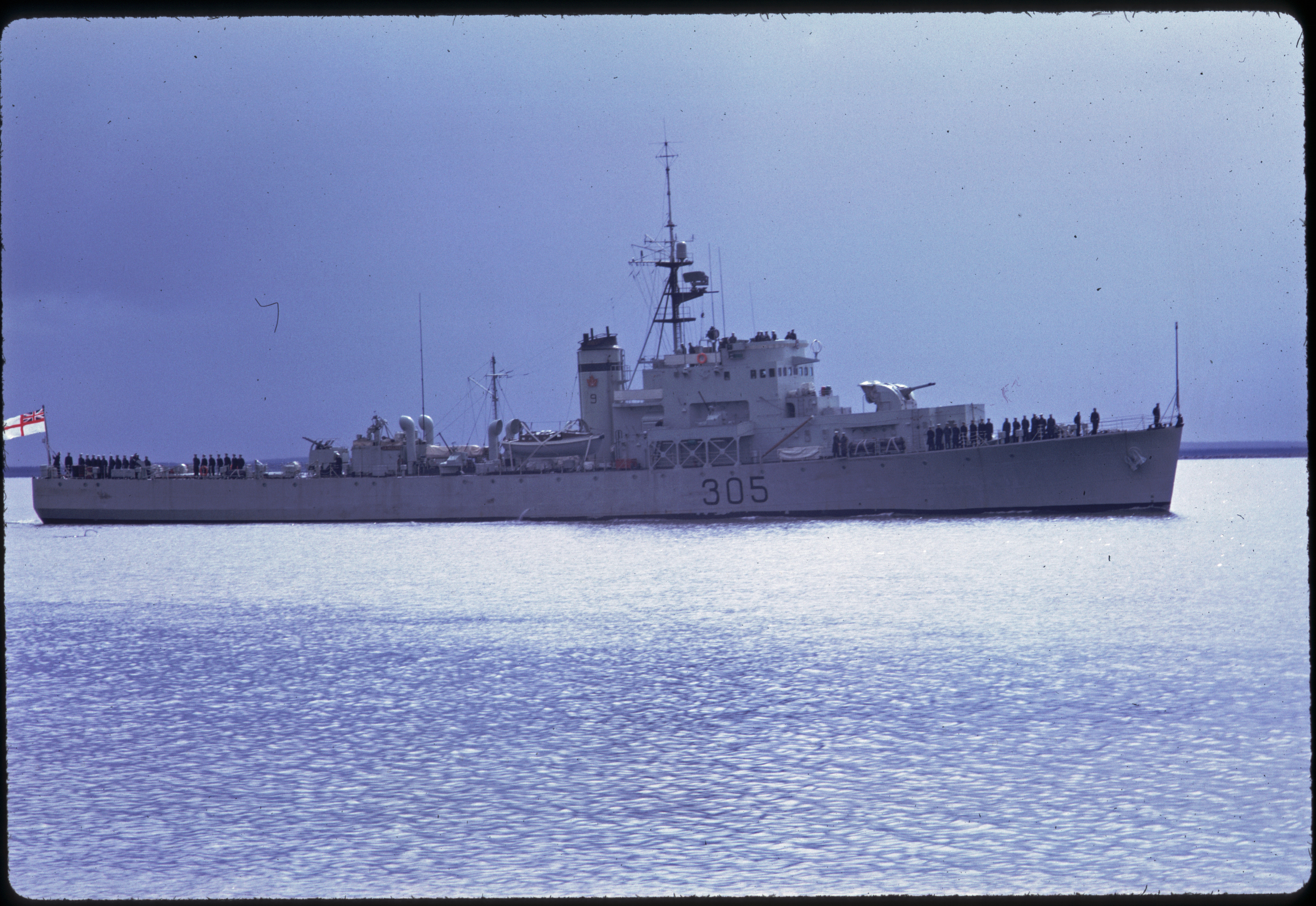
Prestonian class La Hulloise leaving Fort Churchill in 1962

La Hulloise was recommissioned on 9 October 1957 with pennant number 305. In 1961, the frigate was a member of the Ninth Canadian Escort Squadron. She remained in service until 16 July 1965 when she was paid off. She was sold and broken up at La Spezia, Italy in 1966.

== Sources ==
- Arbuckle, J. Graeme (1987). Badges of the Canadian Navy. Halifax, Nova Scotia: Nimbus Publishing. ISBN 0-920852-49-1.
- Rohwer, Jürgen (2005). Chronology of the War at Sea 1939–1945: The Naval History of World War Two (Revised & Expanded ed.). Annapolis, Maryland: Naval Institute Press. ISBN 1-59114-119-2.
