= HMCS Strathadam =

River-class frigate of the Royal Canadian Navy

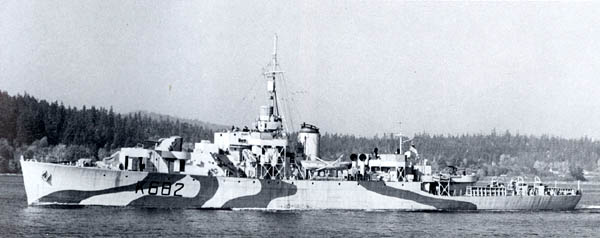
- HMCS Strathadam

History

Canada
- Name: Strathadam
- Namesake: Strathadam, New Brunswick
- Operator: Royal Canadian Navy
- Ordered: 1 February 1943
- Builder: Yarrows, Esquimalt
- Laid down: 6 December 1943
- Launched: 20 March 1944
- Commissioned: 29 September 1944
- Decommissioned: 7 November 1945
- Identification: pennant number: K 682
- Honours and awards: Atlantic 1945
- Fate: Sold 1947 to Uruguayan interests

Israel
- Name: Misgav
- Operator: Israeli Navy
- Acquired: 1950
- Identification: Pennant number: K 30
- Fate: Broken up 1959

General characteristics
- Class & type: River-class frigate
- Displacement: 1,445 long tons (1,468 t; 1,618 short tons); 2,110 long tons (2,140 t; 2,360 short tons) (deep load)
- Length: 283 ft (86.26 m) p/p; 301.25 ft (91.82 m)o/a
- Beam: 36.5 ft (11.13 m)
- Draught: 9 ft (2.74 m); 13 ft (3.96 m) (deep load)
- Propulsion: 2 x Admiralty 3-drum boilers, 2 shafts, reciprocating vertical triple expansion, 5,500 ihp (4,100 kW)
- Speed: 20 knots (37.0 km/h); 20.5 knots (38.0 km/h) (turbine ships)
- Range: 646 long tons (656 t; 724 short tons) oil fuel; 7,500 nautical miles (13,890 km) at 15 knots (27.8 km/h)
- Complement: 157
- Armament: 2 × QF 4 in (102 mm) /45 Mk. XVI on twin mount HA/LA Mk.XIX; 8 × 20 mm QF Oerlikon A/A on twin mounts Mk.V; 1 × Hedgehog 24 spigot A/S projector; up to 150 depth charges

HMCS Strathadam was a River-class frigate that served with the Royal Canadian Navy during the Second World War. She served primarily as a convoy escort in the Battle of the Atlantic. She was named for Strathadam, New Brunswick. After the war she was made part of the nascent Israeli Navy as the renamed Misgav.

Strathadam was ordered on 1 February 1943 as part of the 1943–1944 River-class building program. She was laid down on 6 December 1943 by Yarrows Ltd. at Esquimalt and launched 20 March 1944. She was commissioned into the Royal Canadian Navy on 29 September at Victoria, British Columbia.

== Background ==
The River-class frigate was designed by William Reed of Smith's Dock Company of South Bank-on-Tees. Originally called a "twin-screw corvette", its purpose was to improve on the convoy escort classes in service with the Royal Navy at the time, including the Flower-class corvette. The first orders were placed by the Royal Navy in 1940 and the vessels were named for rivers in the United Kingdom, giving name to the class. In Canada they were named for towns and cities though they kept the same designation. The name "frigate" was suggested by Vice-Admiral Percy Nelles of the Royal Canadian Navy and was adopted later that year.

Improvements over the corvette design included improved accommodation which was markedly better. The twin engines gave only three more knots of speed but extended the range of the ship to nearly double that of a corvette at 7,200 nautical miles (13,300 km) at 12 knots. Among other lessons applied to the design was an armament package better designed to combat U-boats including a twin 4-inch mount forward and 12-pounder aft. 15 Canadian frigates were initially fitted with a single 4-inch gun forward but with the exception of HMCS Valleyfield, they were all eventually upgraded to the double mount. For underwater targets, the River-class frigate was equipped with a Hedgehog anti-submarine mortar and depth charge rails aft and four side-mounted throwers.

River-class frigates were the first Royal Canadian Navy warships to carry the 147B Sword horizontal fan echo sonar transmitter in addition to the irregular ASDIC. This allowed the ship to maintain contact with targets even while firing unless a target was struck. Improved radar and direction-finding equipment improved the RCN's ability to find and track enemy submarines over the previous classes.

Canada originally ordered the construction of 33 frigates in October 1941. The design was too big for the shipyards on the Great Lakes so all the frigates built in Canada were built in dockyards along the west coast or along the St. Lawrence River. In all Canada ordered the construction of 60 frigates including ten for the Royal Navy that transferred two to the United States Navy.

== War service ==
After working up in Bermuda at the end of 1944, she was assigned to escort group EG 25 based in Derry. She made one trip to Gibraltar escorting a convoy, but for the rest of the war in Europe, she remained primarily in the waters around the United Kingdom. On 7 March 1945, alongside HMCS La Hulloise and HMCS Thetford Mines, she sank the German submarine U-1302 in St. George's Channel using depth charges and hedgehogs.

While performing an attack on a suspected target on 11 April 1945, Strathadam was damaged when one of her hedgehogs exploded prematurely, killing six of her crew. At the end of May, she returned to Canada to undergo a tropicalization refit in preparation for service in the southern Pacific Ocean. This refit was begun in July and required the installation of water-cooling and refrigeration abilities and changing the camouflage pattern. The refit was cancelled in August after the surrender of Japan and Strathadam was paid off 7 November 1945. She was laid up at Shelburne, Nova Scotia.

== Postwar service ==
Strathadam was sold to Uruguayan interests in 1947 before ending up in the hands of the nascent Israeli Navy in 1950. She was renamed Misgav and given the new pennant number K-30. In August 1953, while making her way back from naval exercises in the Mediterranean Sea with the rest of the Israeli fleet, a series of emergency distress calls were received from the Greek islands after the Ionian earthquake had hit the region. The fleet requested permission from headquarters and were ordered to provide aid. The crew of Misgav aided the inhabitants of Kefalonia in recovering from the disaster. She was discarded by the Israeli Navy.
