= Donald M. Carpenter =

Naval Aviator

Donald Marshall Carpenter
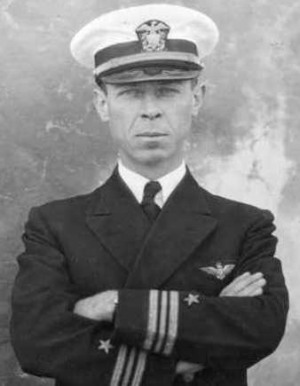
- US Navy file photo of Donald M. Carpenter Jan. 1928
- Born: March 6, 1894; Hopbottom Twp., Lackawanna County, Pennsylvania
- Died: April 4, 1940 (aged 46); San Diego Naval Hospital, San Diego, San Diego, California
- Burial place: Fort Rosecrans National Cemetery in San Diego
- Military career
- Allegiance: United States of America
- Branch: United States Navy
- Service years: 1912–1936
- Rank: Lieutenant Commander
- Nickname: “Doc”

Donald Marshall Carpenter (March 6, 1894 – April 4, 1940) was an early naval aviator in the United States Navy flying from the USS Langley (CV-1) and USS Lexington (CV-2). These were the first two aircraft carriers of the U.S. Navy. He graduated from the U. S. Naval Academy in the Class of 1916 representing Pennsylvania. He is the namesake of the USS Carpenter (DD-825).

== Family ==
His father was Dan E. Carpenter (1866–1938) and his mother was Stella M. McVicar (abt 1873-?). His ancestry includes William Carpenter, the immigrant, who was born about 1605 in England. See: Rehoboth Carpenter family.

"Doc" married Clara Dorr Moreno (1903–2000) of Pensacola, Escambia County, Florida and they had two children; Donald Marshall Carpenter and Dan Moreno Carpenter.

== Biography ==
Carpenter, born in Hopbottom township, Lackawanna County, Pennsylvania, on March 6, 1894, attended grade schools in Scranton and high school in the Pittsburgh are industrial town of McKeesport. He was appointed a Midshipman from the 30th District of Pennsylvania on July 11, 1912. Graduating from the United States Naval Academy, Annapolis, Maryland, on June 2, 1916, “Doc” Carpenter reported to his first ship, Wyoming (Battleship No. 32) on June 17. He was commissioned Ensign on July 5, 1916.

=== Early career ===
During his World War I service in Wyoming, Carpenter received temporary promotions to Lieutenant (junior grade) (Lt.JG) (October 3, 1917) and Lieutenant (February 6, 1918); permanent promotions to those ranks followed, on March 12, 1920 and March 31, 1921, respectively. Detached from Wyoming on May 16, 1921, Carpenter reported to Mare Island Navy Yard, Vallejo, California, five days later, and over the ensuing months, helped fit out the new battleship California (BB-44).

Detached from California on May 8, 1922, Carpenter was slated to join Nevada (BB-36) before her departure for the Atlantic coast, but received authorization to proceed to Pensacola, Florida, via commercial transportation, at his own expense, “for temporary duty under instruction in heavier-than-air craft.” Opting for flight training over continued service in battleships, Carpenter, authorized a month's delay in transit, reported to Naval Air Station Pensacola on June 19, 1922.

Upon completion of flight training, Carpenter was detached from NAS Pensacola on April 3, 1923; he also married Clara Moreno the same day (a union that ultimately produced two sons). He reported for duty with Aircraft Squadrons, Battle Fleet, on April 27, 1923, and remained with that aeronautical organization until assigned temporary duty with Aircraft Squadrons, Scouting Fleet; he served with that unit until May 20, 1925.

Commissioned Lieutenant Commander (LTCMDR) on February 5, 1927 while at Pensacola, Carpenter joined Stoddert (DD-302) on June 23, 1928 upon that destroyer's return from operations with the Battle Fleet in Hawaiian waters, and served as her executive officer until September 20, 1929.

=== Naval Aviation ===
Ordered to Langley (CV-1), he reported for duty the following day, and served in that aircraft carrier until June 30, 1930.

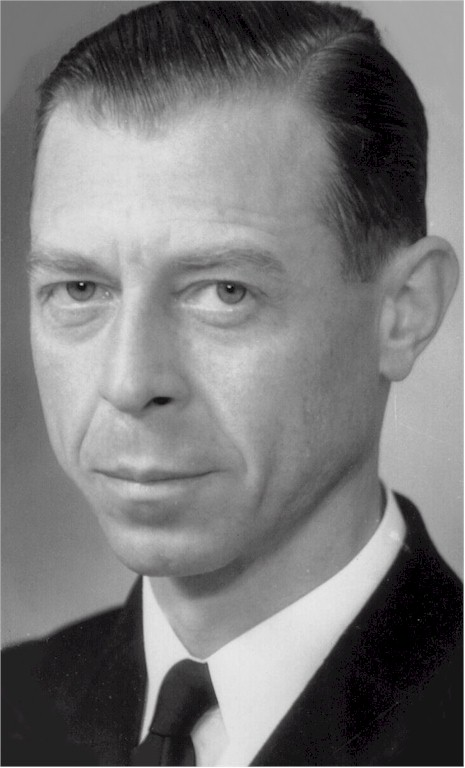
Lt. Commander Donald M. Carpenter. US Navy Photo.

Assuming command on June 30, 1930 of Scouting Squadron 3B (VS-3B), Aircraft Squadrons, Battle Fleet, which operated in the air group assigned to the aircraft carrier Lexington (CV-2), he remained in that billet through his squadron's being assigned to Carrier Divisions, U.S. Fleet, on October 25, 1930. Leaving VS-3B on April 25, 1931, Carpenter became executive officer (XO) of Fleet Air Base, Coco Solo, Canal Zone, on May 26, 1931, a billet he filled for almost two years, until relieved on July 19, 1933 to assume the post of operations officer for Aircraft Squadrons, Coco Solo.

During the late summer of 1933, Carpenter commanded the ferry flight of the first division of Patrol Squadron 5F (VP-5F) from NAS Norfolk, Virginia to FAB Coco Solo. Carpenter flew 5-P-2, one of six Consolidated P2Y-1 flying boats that departed Norfolk mid-way through the first dog watch on September 7, 1933 (accompanied personally during the initial stages of the flight by Rear Admiral Ernest J. King, Chief of the Bureau of Aeronautics, in a Vought SU-1) and reached its destination, a little over halfway through the second dog watch the next day, having covered the 1,788 nautical miles (3,311 km) in a total elapsed time of 25 hours and 29 minutes. In the longest non-stop formation seaplane flight in history, the six flying boats battled headwinds for almost the entire aerial voyage, at one point encountering a heavy squall with velocity approaching 50 knots (90 km/h).

=== Late career ===
Detached from FAB Coco Solo on May 15, 1934, Carpenter reported on board seaplane tender Wright (AV-1) three days later, and became her navigator on May 30, 1934. He carried out those duties until hospitalized at the San Diego Naval Hospital, California, on November 20, 1934. Released the following spring, he served at NAS San Diego from April 11 to September 3, 1935 before he became Inspector of Naval Aircraft, San Diego, on the latter date. Detached on July 10, 1936 to the Training Division within the San Diego Naval Station, he was relieved of all active duty and placed on the retired list on October 1, 1936. Carpenter died of lobar pneumonia at the San Diego Naval Hospital on April 4, 1940.

== "Sincere respect" ==
On June 18, 1945, Mrs. Edward S. Shaw, sister of Carpenter's widow Clara, wrote to Admiral King, then Commander in Chief, U.S. Fleet (who had commanded Lexington when Carpenter had commanded VS-3B) suggesting that a ship be named for the late leader of VP-5F's historic flight in 1933, citing the “sincere respect” her brother-in-law had felt for King. “I sincerely hope you will not consider me presumptuous,” she wrote, “but if you could lend your approval to such an honor for 'Doc' as we all knew him, I would appreciate it very much.”

“Please do this if you can,” King wrote to the Chief of Naval Personnel, who recommended the name assignment on July 10, 1945; consequently, on July 14, 1945, Secretary of the Navy James Forrestal assigned the name Carpenter to DD-825. In writing to Secretary Forrestal upon being informed of the naming of the ship, Carpenter's widow wrote on August 9, 1945 of her “deep appreciation of the honor bestowed on my two sons and me in the naming of this ship for my late husband and I hope her record will be one of which to be proud…”

=== USS Carpenter ===
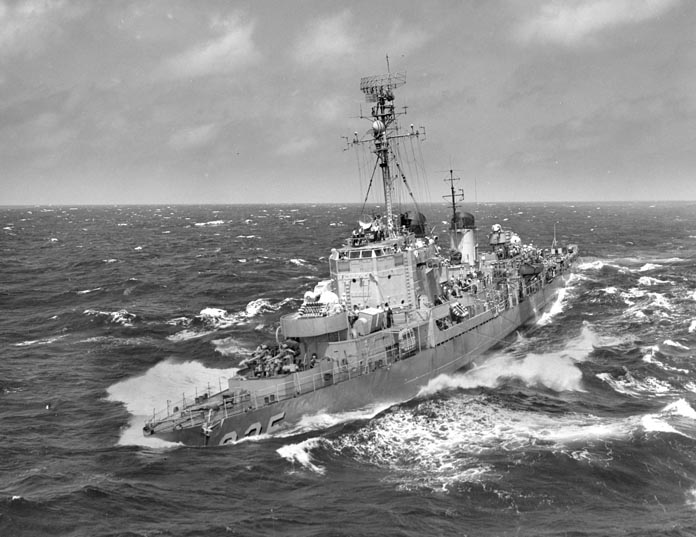
US Navy Photo of the USS Carpenter in heavy seas off Australia. Undated photo.

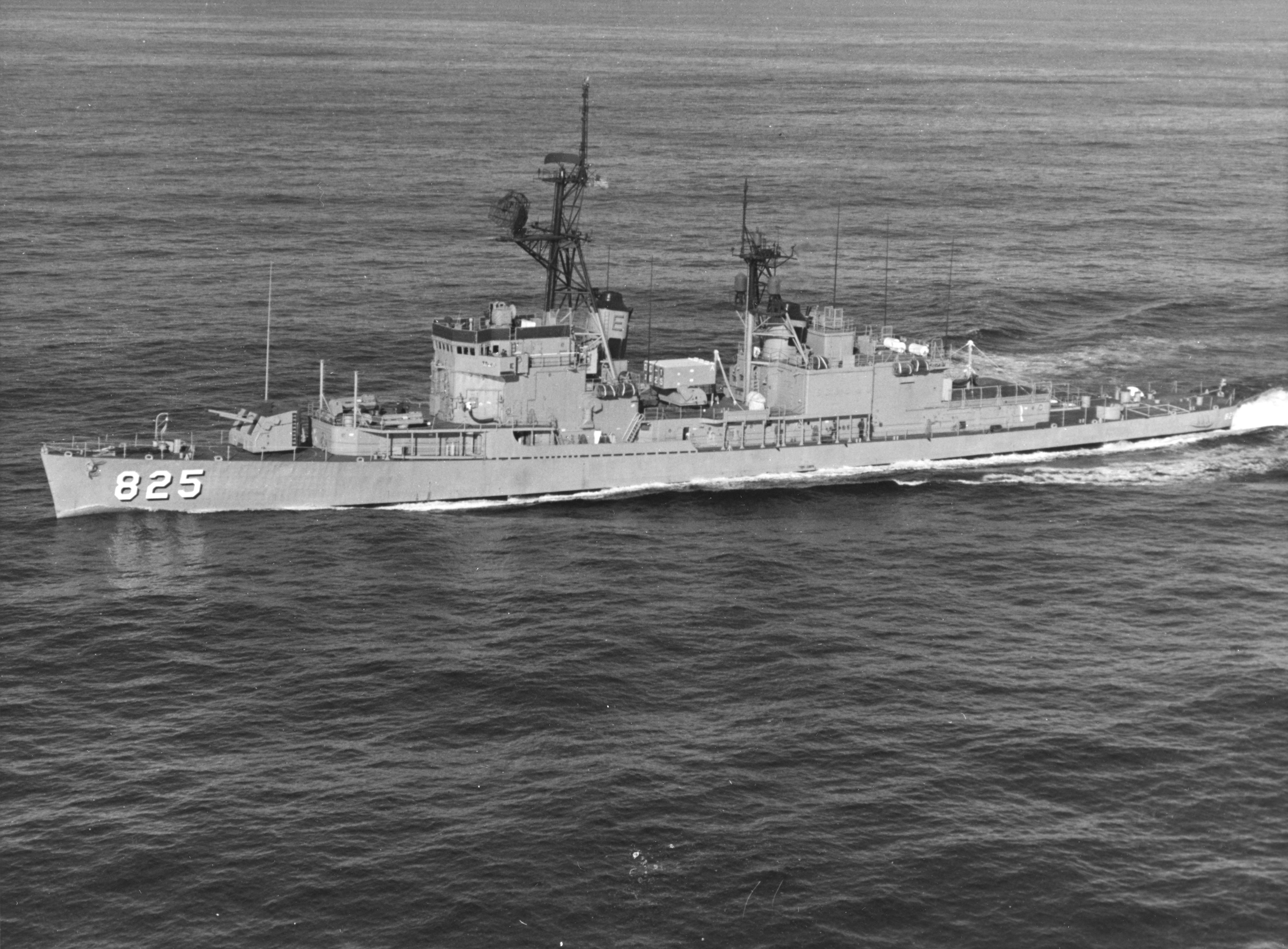
USS Carpenter DD-825 circa 1965 - US Navy Photo

During World War II to honor his service to his country, a U.S. Navy destroyer was named for him. The USS Carpenter (DD-825) was built by Consolidated Steel Corporation of Orange, Texas. She was also known as DDK 825 and DDE 825. She had a role in the 1980 movie Raise the Titanic.

The keel was laid on July 30, 1945 and she was launched on Dec 28, 1945. Due to cutbacks after the war she was not completed until December 15, 1949 in Newport News, Virginia with a commission date of December 15, 1949.

The USS Carpenter (DD-825) served well and honorably through several variations until on February 20, 1981, at age 36, she was decommissioned and later stricken from the rolls of the U.S. Navy.

The country of Turkey requested and leased her for the Turkish Navy where she was renamed the Anitepe as D-347 on February 20, 1981. She was later purchased outright by Turkey. After her second career, she was retired in November 1997 completing over 52 years of service and was broken up for scrap in 1999.
