= HMCS Sussexvale =

WWII-era Canadian frigate

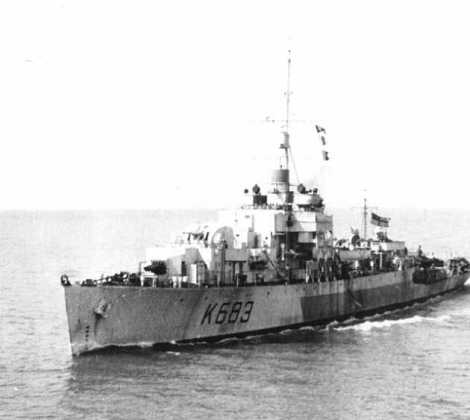
- HMCS Sussexvale

History

Canada
- Name: Sussexvale
- Namesake: Sussex, New Brunswick
- Ordered: 1 February 1943
- Builder: Davie Shipbuilding, Lauzon
- Laid down: 15 November 1943
- Launched: 12 July 1944
- Commissioned: 29 November 1944
- Decommissioned: 16 November 1945
- Identification: Pennant number: K 683
- Recommissioned: 8 August 1955
- Decommissioned: 30 November 1966
- Reclassified: Prestonian-class frigate
- Identification: pennant number: FFE 313
- Motto: Non nobis sed omnibus ("Not for ourselves alone, but for all")
- Honours and awards: Atlantic 1945, English Channel 1945
- Fate: Scrapped 1967
- Badge: Party per fess wavy gules and azure, a martlet or

General characteristics
- Class & type: River-class frigate
- Displacement: 1,445 long tons (1,468 t; 1,618 short tons); 2,110 long tons (2,140 t; 2,360 short tons) (deep load)
- Length: 283 ft (86.26 m) p/p; 301.25 ft (91.82 m)o/a
- Beam: 36.5 ft (11.13 m)
- Draught: 9 ft (2.74 m); 13 ft (3.96 m) (deep load)
- Propulsion: 2 x Admiralty 3-drum boilers, 2 shafts, reciprocating vertical triple expansion, 5,500 ihp (4,100 kW)
- Speed: 20 knots (37.0 km/h); 20.5 knots (38.0 km/h) (turbine ships)
- Range: 646 long tons (656 t; 724 short tons) oil fuel; 7,500 nautical miles (13,890 km) at 15 knots (27.8 km/h)
- Complement: 157
- Armament: 2 × QF 4 in (102 mm)/45 Mk. XVI on twin mount HA/LA Mk.XIX; 1 × QF 12 pdr (3 in (76 mm)) 12 cwt /40 Mk. V on mounting HA/LA Mk.IX (not all ships); 8 × 20 mm QF Oerlikon A/A on twin mounts Mk.V; 1 × Hedgehog 24 spigot A/S projector; up to 150 depth charges

HMCS Sussexvale was a River-class frigate that served with the Royal Canadian Navy during the Second World War. She served primarily as a convoy escort in the Battle of the Atlantic. She was named for Sussex, New Brunswick. Her name was altered to prevent confusion with other Allied warships named Sussex. After the war she was converted to a Prestonian-class frigate and served until 1966. She was the last frigate launched by the Royal Canadian Navy during the Second World War.

Sussexvale was ordered as Valdorian on 1 February 1943 as part of the 1943–1944 River-class building program. She was laid down on 15 November 1943 by Davie Shipbuilding and Repairing Co. Ltd. at Lauzon, Quebec and launched 12 July 1944. At some point during 1944, her name was changed to Sussexvale. She was commissioned into the Royal Canadian Navy on 29 November 1944 at Quebec City.

== Background ==
The River-class frigate was designed by William Reed of Smith's Dock Company of South Bank-on-Tees. Originally called a "twin-screw corvette", its purpose was to improve on the convoy escort classes in service with the Royal Navy at the time, including the Flower-class corvette. The first orders were placed by the Royal Navy in 1940 and the vessels were named for rivers in the United Kingdom, giving name to the class. In Canada they were named for towns and cities though they kept the same designation. The name "frigate" was suggested by Vice-Admiral Percy Nelles of the Royal Canadian Navy and was adopted later that year.

Improvements over the corvette design included improved accommodation which was markedly better. The twin engines gave only three more knots of speed but extended the range of the ship to nearly double that of a corvette at 7,200 nautical miles (13,300 km) at 12 knots. Among other lessons applied to the design was an armament package better designed to combat U-boats including a twin 4-inch mount forward and 12-pounder aft. 15 Canadian frigates were initially fitted with a single 4-inch gun forward but with the exception of HMCS Valleyfield, they were all eventually upgraded to the double mount. For underwater targets, the River-class frigate was equipped with a Hedgehog anti-submarine mortar and depth charge rails aft and four side-mounted throwers.

River-class frigates were the first Royal Canadian Navy warships to carry the 147B Sword horizontal fan echo sonar transmitter in addition to the irregular ASDIC. This allowed the ship to maintain contact with targets even while firing unless a target was struck. Improved radar and direction-finding equipment improved the RCN's ability to find and track enemy submarines over the previous classes.

Canada originally ordered the construction of 33 frigates in October 1941. The design was too big for the shipyards on the Great Lakes so all the frigates built in Canada were built in dockyards along the west coast or along the St. Lawrence River. In all Canada ordered the construction of 60 frigates including ten for the Royal Navy that transferred two to the United States Navy.

== Service history ==
After working up at Bermuda in January 1945, Sussexvale was assigned to escort group EG 28. She joined the group in Derry in March and spent the rest of the war in Europe patrolling the waters around the United Kingdom. From 14 March to 20 April, EG 28 was among the escort groups deployed in the English Channel. In May 1945, she returned to Canada to undergo a tropicalization refit in preparation for service in the southern Pacific Ocean. This meant adding refrigeration and water-cooling capabilities and changing the camouflage. The refit was performed at Shelburne but was never finished, having been cancelled due to the surrender of Japan. She was paid off on 16 November 1945 at Sydney, Nova Scotia and placed in reserve at Shelburne.

=== Postwar service ===
Sussexvale was sold to Marine Industries Ltd. after the war. However, with the increasing Soviet submarine threat, the Royal Canadian Navy sought to augment its anti-submarine forces. Sussexvale was reacquired and converted into a Prestonian-class frigate at Halifax. This meant a flush-decked appearance aft, with a larger bridge and taller funnel. Her hull forward was strengthened against ice and the quarterdeck was enclosed to contain two Squid anti-submarine mortars. On 1 January 1955, Sussexvale was assigned to the Second Canadian Escort Squadron of Pacific Command. She emerged from her conversion and was recommissioned on 18 March 1955 with the new pennant number 313. The frigate sailed for the west coast on 17 April arriving at Esquimalt in May.

Sussexvale served with the Fourth Canadian Escort Squadron. She served as a training ship, having a deckhouse fitted midships to provide classrooms and mess facilities for officer cadets undergoing sea training. This deckhouse did not affect her combat capabilities. She remained in this role until being paid off 30 November 1966. In January 1960, Sussexvale and three other Prestonian-class ships made a tour of South American ports, visiting San Diego, Balboa, the Galapagos Islands, Callao and Valparaíso, Talara and Long Beach. Sussexvale was a member of the Fourth Canadian Escort Squadron based out of Esquimalt. In June 1960 the Fourth Canadian Escort Squadron performed a training tour of the Pacific, with stops at Yokohama, Japan, Midway Atoll and Pearl Harbor. They returned to Canada in August. From January to March 1961, Sussexvale, New Glasgow and Beacon Hill performed a training cruise to the South Pacific, visiting Hawaii, Fiji, New Zealand, Australia and Samoa. She was sold to Kennedy & Mitsui of Vancouver for breaking up in Japan in 1967.
