= German submarine U-1302 =

German World War II submarine

History

Nazi Germany
- Name: U-1302
- Ordered: 2 April 1942
- Builder: Flensburger Schiffbau-Gesellschaft, Flensburg
- Yard number: 495
- Laid down: 6 March 1943
- Launched: 4 April 1944
- Commissioned: 25 May 1944
- Fate: Sunk on 7 March 1945 in St George's Channel

General characteristics
- Class & type: Type VIIC/41 submarine
- Displacement: 759 tonnes (747 long tons) surfaced; 860 t (846 long tons) submerged
- Length: 67.10 m (220 ft 2 in) (o/a); 50.50 m (165 ft 8 in) (pressure hull)
- Beam: 6.20 m (20 ft 4 in) o/a; 4.70 m (15 ft 5 in) (pressure hull)
- Height: 9.60 m (31 ft 6 in)
- Draught: 4.74 m (15 ft 7 in)
- Installed power: 2,800–3,200 PS (2,100–2,400 kW; 2,800–3,200 bhp) (diesels); 750 PS (550 kW; 740 shp) (electric)
- Propulsion: 2 × shafts; 2 × 1.23 m (48 in) propellers
- Speed: 17.7 knots (32.8 km/h; 20.4 mph) surfaced; 7.6 knots (14.1 km/h; 8.7 mph) submerged
- Range: 8,500 nautical miles (15,700 km; 9,800 mi) at 10 knots (19 km/h; 12 mph) surfaced; 80 nmi (150 km; 92 mi) at 4 knots (7.4 km/h; 4.6 mph) submerged
- Test depth: 230 m (750 ft); Calculated crush depth: 250–295 m (820–968 ft)
- Complement: 4 officers 40 – 56 enlisted
- Armament: 5 × 53.3 cm (21 in) torpedo tubes (four bow, one stern); 14 × torpedoes; 1 × 8.8 cm (3.46 in) deck gun (220 rounds); 1 × 3.7 cm (1.5 in) Flak M42 AA gun; 2 × 2 cm (0.79 in) C/30 AA guns

Service record
- Part of: 4th U-boat Flotilla; 25 May – 31 December 1944; 11th U-boat Flotilla; 1 January – 7 March 1945
- Identification codes: M 38 782
- Commanders: Oblt.z.S. / Kptlt. Wolfgang Herwartz; 25 May 1944 – 7 March 1945
- Operations: 1 patrol: 3 February – 7 March 1945
- Victories: 3 merchant ships sunk (8,386 GRT)

German submarine U-1302 was a Type VIIC/41 U-boat of Nazi Germany's Kriegsmarine for service in World War II. She was commissioned on 25 May 1944.

U-1302 served with 4th U-boat Flotilla for training and later with 11th U-boat Flotilla from 1 January 1945 until 7 March 1945.

U-1302 completed one patrol between February and March 1945, sinking three ships totalling 8,386 gross register tons (GRT).

== Design ==
German Type VIIC/41 submarines were preceded by the heavier Type VIIC submarines. U-1302 had a displacement of 759 tonnes (747 long tons) when at the surface and 860 tonnes (850 long tons) while submerged. She had a total length of 67.10 m (220 ft 2 in), a pressure hull length of 50.50 m (165 ft 8 in), a beam of 6.20 m (20 ft 4 in), a height of 9.60 m (31 ft 6 in), and a draught of 4.74 m (15 ft 7 in). The submarine was powered by two Germaniawerft F46 four-stroke, six-cylinder supercharged diesel engines producing a total of 2,800 to 3,200 metric horsepower (2,060 to 2,350 kW; 2,760 to 3,160 shp) for use while surfaced, two AEG GU 460/8–27 double-acting electric motors producing a total of 750 metric horsepower (550 kW; 740 shp) for use while submerged. She had two shafts and two 1.23 m (4 ft) propellers. The boat was capable of operating at depths of up to 230 metres (750 ft).

The submarine had a maximum surface speed of 17.7 knots (32.8 km/h; 20.4 mph) and a maximum submerged speed of 7.6 knots (14.1 km/h; 8.7 mph). When submerged, the boat could operate for 80 nautical miles (150 km; 92 mi) at 4 knots (7.4 km/h; 4.6 mph); when surfaced, she could travel 8,500 nautical miles (15,700 km; 9,800 mi) at 10 knots (19 km/h; 12 mph). U-1302 was fitted with five 53.3 cm (21 in) torpedo tubes (four fitted at the bow and one at the stern), fourteen torpedoes, one 8.8 cm (3.46 in) SK C/35 naval gun, (220 rounds), one 3.7 cm (1.5 in) Flak M42 and two 2 cm (0.79 in) C/30 anti-aircraft guns. The boat had a complement of between forty-four and sixty.

== Service history ==
U-1302 was sunk with all hands on 7 March 1945 in St George's Channel, at position 52°19′N 05°23′W, by depth charges from the Canadian frigates HMCS La Hulloise, HMCS Strathadam, and HMCS Thetford Mines.

== Summary of raiding history ==
Date	Ship Name	Nationality	Tonnage (GRT)	Fate
28 February 1945	Norfolk Coast	United Kingdom	646	Sunk
2 March 1945	King Edgar	United Kingdom	4,536	Sunk
2 March 1945	Novasli	Norway	3,204	Sunk

== See also ==
- Battle of the Atlantic (1939-1945)

== Bibliography ==
- Bishop, Chris (2006). Kriegsmarine U-Boats, 1939–45. London: Amber Books. ISBN 978-1-904687-96-2.
- Busch, Rainer; Röll, Hans-Joachim (1999). German U-boat commanders of World War II : a biographical dictionary. Translated by Brooks, Geoffrey. London, Annapolis, Md: Greenhill Books, Naval Institute Press. ISBN 1-55750-186-6.
- Busch, Rainer; Röll, Hans-Joachim (1999). Deutsche U-Boot-Verluste von September 1939 bis Mai 1945 [German U-boat losses from September 1939 to May 1945]. Der U-Boot-Krieg (in German). Vol. IV. Hamburg, Berlin, Bonn: Mittler. ISBN 3-8132-0514-2.
- Gröner, Erich (1985). Die deutschen Kriegsschiffe 1815–1945 / 3, U-Boote, Hilfskreuzer, Minenschiffe, Netzleger, Sperrbrecher (in German). Koblenz: Bernard & Graefe. ISBN 3-7637-4802-4. OCLC 310610321.
- Gröner, Erich; Jung, Dieter; Maass, Martin (1991). U-boats and Mine Warfare Vessels. German Warships 1815–1945. Vol. 2. Translated by Thomas, Keith; Magowan, Rachel. London: Conway Maritime Press. ISBN 0-85177-593-4.
