= HMCS Beacon Hill =

Frigate in the Canadian navy

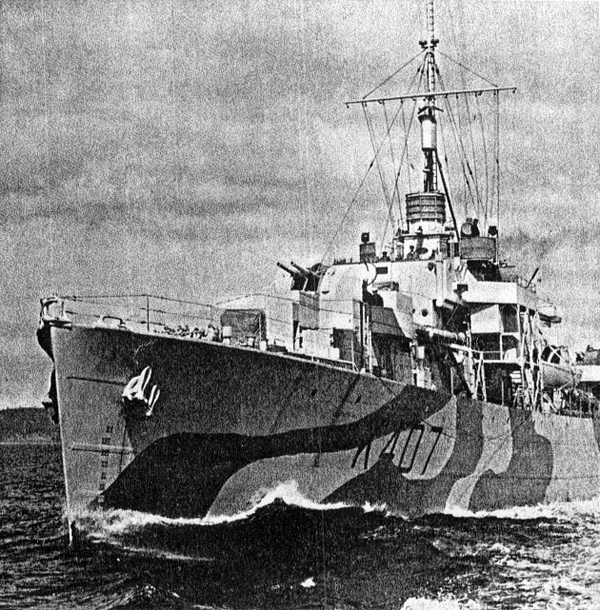
- HMCS Beacon Hill

History

Canada
- Name: Beacon Hill
- Ordered: October 1941
- Builder: Yarrows, Esquimalt
- Laid down: 16 July 1943
- Launched: 6 November 1943
- Commissioned: 16 May 1944
- Decommissioned: 6 February 1946
- Identification: pennant number: K 407
- Recommissioned: 21 December 1957
- Decommissioned: 15 September 1967
- Reclassified: Prestonian-class frigate 1954
- Identification: pennant number: FFE 303
- Motto: Semper Libe
- Honours and awards: Atlantic 1944-45, English Channel 1944-45.
- Fate: Scrapped Sakai, Japan 1968
- Badge: Sable, upon a mount vert a cresset or, fired proper

General characteristics
- Class & type: River-class frigate
- Displacement: 1,445 long tons (1,468 t; 1,618 short tons); 2,110 long tons (2,140 t; 2,360 short tons) (deep load)
- Length: 283 ft (86.26 m) p/p; 301.25 ft (91.82 m)o/a
- Beam: 36.5 ft (11.13 m)
- Draught: 9 ft (2.74 m); 13 ft (3.96 m) (deep load)
- Propulsion: 2 × Admiralty 3-drum boilers, 2 shafts, reciprocating vertical triple expansion, 5,500 ihp (4,100 kW)
- Speed: 20 knots (37.0 km/h); 20.5 knots (38.0 km/h) (turbine ships)
- Range: 646 long tons (656 t; 724 short tons) oil fuel; 7,500 nautical miles (13,890 km) at 15 knots (27.8 km/h)
- Complement: 157
- Armament: 2 × QF 4-inch (102 mm) Mk. XVI guns on twin mount HA/LA Mk.XIX; 8 × 20 mm Oerlikon A/A guns on twin mounts Mk.V; 1 × Hedgehog 24 spigot Anti-submarine projector; up to 150 depth charges

HMCS Beacon Hill was a River-class frigate that served in the Royal Canadian Navy (RCN) as an ocean convoy escort during the Second World War that entered service in 1944. She fought primarily in the Battle of the Atlantic. In 1954 she was converted to a Prestonian-class frigate and served until 1967. She was named for Victoria, British Columbia, but because HMS Victorious was in service with the Royal Navy, the RCN, in an effort to avoid confusion, chose to honour the city by choosing another name associated with it. The ship was sold for scrap and broken up in Japan.

== Background ==
The River-class frigate design was an upgraded version of the Flower-class corvette, remedying many of the Flower class' issues as an ocean escort. The initial vessels were constructed for the Royal Navy and were named for rivers, however, in Canada, they were named for cities. Canada was informed of the design development in December 1940, but the plans were not delivered until late April 1941. The design was too large to fit through the canals on the St. Lawrence River, restricting the construction of the River-class ships to three shipyards, all with direct access to the sea. The first fifteen Canadian ships followed the standard British design.

The frigates measured 301 feet 4 inches (91.85 m) long overall and 283 ft 0 in (86.26 m) between perpendiculars with a beam of 36 ft 7 in (11.15 m) and a draught of 9 ft 0 in (2.74 m). They had a standard displacement of 1,445 long tons (1,468 t) and had increased flare and sheer forward to improve the vessel's dryness at sea. They were square amidships with deep bilge keels to alleviate rolling in heavy seas. They had a complement of 10 officers and 135 ratings.

The River class were powered by a steam created by two Admiralty three-drum boilers pumped to a vertical triple expansion engine turning two propeller shafts. The system creating 5,500 indicated horsepower (4,100 kW) giving the ships a maximum speed of 20 knots (37 km/h; 23 mph). The frigates carried 440 long tons (450 t) of oil fuel and they had a range of 7,200 nautical miles (13,300 km; 8,300 mi) at 12 knots (22 km/h; 14 mph).

The first 15 Canadian ships that followed the British design mounted a single 4-inch (102 mm) gun forward and one aft. The remaining Canadian ships mounted twin 4-inch guns forward and a single 12-pounder naval gun aft. The Canadian ships had eight 20 mm (0.79 in) cannon in four twin powered mounts for anti-aircraft defence. They also mounted four heavy machine guns. Two of the 20 mm mounts faced forward and two astern, with two located on the bridge wings and two at the break of the forecastle. For anti-submarine warfare (ASW) the ships carried a Hedgehog ASW mortar forward and the frigates initially carried 100 depth charges, later rising to 145, to be fired from four throwers and two stern tracks and rails. Two of the throwers were located on the port side of the ship, and the other two on the starboard side. 30 charges were kept for the rails and racks and 32 for the throwers. During the war, all of the early ships that mounted single 4-inch guns forward were refitted to carry the twin mount instead. Furthermore, the 12-pounder guns were replaced by twin 40 mm (1.6 in) cannon.

The River-class frigates were equipped with the Type 147B Sword sonar and ASDIC which were used in conjunction to find submarines below the surface. The combination of the two allowed for the frigates to maintain tracking targets even while firing. For tracking surfaced submarines, HFDF was installed. HFDF searched for the communication signals of opposing submarines, which had to surface to communicate.

== Service history ==
The frigate was ordered in October 1941 as part of the 1942–43 River-class building programme. She was laid down on 16 July 1943 by Yarrows Ltd. at Esquimalt, British Columbia and launched on 6 November. She was named Beacon Hull for Victoria, British Columbia, but because the larger HMS Victorious was in service with the Royal Navy, the Royal Canadian Navy, in an effort to avoid confusion, chose to honour the city by choosing another name associated with it. Beacon Hill was commissioned 16 May 1944 at Esquimalt.

In response to the growing U-boat threat in British coastal waters, Canada agreed to provide escort groups to help patrol the area. Three groups of frigates were established and assigned to the Western Approaches. After working up at Bermuda, Beacon Hill was assigned to the Mid-Ocean Escort Force (MOEF) escort group (EG) 26, one of the three groups deployed to the Western Approaches. Based at Londonderry, the groups operated in overlapping patrols in the Shetland-Faroes narrows, off the Hebrides, in the Irish Sea west of Ireland and in St. George's Channel. Operations began in October 1944. For parts of her service with EG 26, Beacon Hill was detached to Plymouth. In the first week of December 1944, EG 26 trained with HMS Seraph, a British submarine, at Holyhead to improve their sub-hunting capabilities. In March 1945, EG 26 deployed from Portsmouth. From at least 14 March to 20 April, Beacon Hill was the Senior Officer's ship of the group. It was during this period that the escort group came in contact with a submarine when on 20 March HMCS New Glasgow rammed a schnorkeling U-boat while sailing for Londonderry. Beacon Hill remained in European waters until May 1945, when she departed for Canada. Intended to be used in the ongoing Pacific campaign, Beacon Hill began her tropicalization refit at Liverpool, Nova Scotia in June. However, the war ended before the refit did in November 1945, and she sailed for Esquimalt. Beacon Hill was paid off at Esquimalt on 6 February 1946 and placed in reserve. For service during the war, Beacon Hill was awarded the battle honours "Atlantic 1944–45" and "English Channel 1944–45". (Note: Thomas has Beacon Hill only being awarded the "Atlantic 1944–45" honour.)

=== Post-war service ===
Beacon Hill was recommissioned in March 1950 as a training ship for cadets. In January 1952, Beacon Hill and Antigonish deployed on a training cruise to South America along the Pacific coast, making several port visits. In May, Sioux, Antigonish and Beacon Hill travelled to Juneau, Alaska and in August, to San Diego on training cruises. She was paid off again in 1954 in preparation for her conversion to a Prestonian-class frigate. Beacon Hill was recommissioned into the RCN with the pennant number FFE 303 on 21 December 1957. During service with the Fourth Canadian Escort Squadron she was fitted with a midship deckhouse to provide classroom and training facilities for officer candidates. Beacon Hill was a member of the Fourth Canadian Escort Squadron based out of Esquimalt, British Columbia. In June 1960 the Fourth Canadian Escort Squadron performed a training tour of the Pacific, with stops at Yokohama, Japan, Midway Atoll and Pearl Harbor. They returned to Canada in August. From January to March 1961, Sussexvale, New Glasgow, and Beacon Hill performed a training cruise to the South Pacific, visiting Hawaii, Fiji, New Zealand, Australia, and Samoa. In the summer of 1966, she and Jonquiere undertook a six-week training cruise with officer cadets and sea cadets with port visits in San Francisco, San Diego and Ketchikan. She served until 15 September 1967 when she was paid off for the final time. She was sold for scrap and broken up at Sakai, Japan in 1968.

== Badge and ship's bell ==
After the Second World War, each unit of the Royal Canadian Navy was awarded a heraldic badge which could be inherited by future units of the same name. Beacon Hill was given a blazon of sable, upon a mount vert a cresset or, fired proper, with the colours gold and black and the Latin motto Semper Libe (Always free). The Christening Bells Project at Canadian Forces Base Esquimalt Naval and Military Museum includes information from the ship's bell of HMCS Beacon Hill 1944–1967, which was used for baptism of babies on board ship 1950–1964. The bell is currently held by the CFB Esquimalt Naval & Military Museum, Esquimalt, British Columbia.
