= German submarine U-1003 =

German World War II submarine

- U-995 Type VIIC/41 at the Laboe Naval Memorial. This U-boat is almost identical to U-1003.

History

Nazi Germany
- Name: U-1003
- Ordered: 14 October 1941
- Builder: Blohm & Voss, Hamburg
- Yard number: 203
- Laid down: 18 January 1943
- Launched: 27 October 1943
- Commissioned: 9 December 1943
- Fate: Scuttled on 23 March 1945

General characteristics
- Type: Type VIIC/41 submarine
- Displacement: 757 long tons (769 t) surfaced; 857 long tons (871 t) submerged
- Length: 67.10 m (220 ft 2 in) o/a; 50.50 m (165 ft 8 in) pressure hull
- Beam: 6.20 m (20 ft 4 in) o/a; 4.70 m (15 ft 5 in) pressure hull
- Height: 9.60 m (31 ft 6 in)
- Draught: 4.74 m (15 ft 7 in)
- Installed power: 2 × diesel engines; 2,800–3,200 PS (2,100–2,400 kW; 2,800–3,200 bhp) (diesels); 750 PS (550 kW; 740 shp) (electric)
- Propulsion: 2 × electric motors; 2 × screws
- Speed: 17.7 knots (32.8 km/h; 20.4 mph) surfaced; 7.6 knots (14.1 km/h; 8.7 mph) submerged
- Range: 8,500 nmi (15,700 km; 9,800 mi) at 10 knots (19 km/h; 12 mph) surfaced; 80 nmi (150 km; 92 mi) at 4 knots (7.4 km/h; 4.6 mph) submerged
- Test depth: 250 m (820 ft); Calculated crush depth: 250–295 m (820–968 ft)
- Complement: 44-52 officers & ratings
- Armament: 5 × 53.3 cm (21 in) torpedo tubes (4 bow, 1 stern); 14 × torpedoes or; 26 × TMA or TMB Naval mines; 1 × 8.8 cm (3.46 in) deck gun (220 rounds); 1 × 3.7 cm (1.5 in) Flak M42 AA gun; 2 × 2 cm (0.79 in) C/30 AA guns

Service record
- Part of: 31st U-boat Flotilla; 9 December 1943 – 31 August 1944; 11th U-boat Flotilla; 1 September 1944 – 23 March 1945
- Identification codes: M 54 077
- Commanders: Oblt.z.S. Werner Strübing; 9 December 1943 – 23 March 1945
- Operations: 2 patrols: 1st patrol: a. 11 October – 16 December 1944; b. 10 – 11 January 1945; 2nd patrol: 19 February – 23 March 1945
- Victories: None

German submarine U-1003 was a Type VIIC/41 U-boat of Nazi Germany's Kriegsmarine during World War II.

She was ordered on 14 October 1941, and was laid down on 18 January 1943, at Blohm & Voss, Hamburg, as yard number 203. She was launched on 27 October 1943, and commissioned under the command of Oberleutnant zur See Werner Strübing on 9 December 1943.

== Design ==
German Type VIIC/41 submarines were preceded by the heavier Type VIIC submarines. U-1003 had a displacement of 769 tonnes (757 long tons) when at the surface and 871 tonnes (857 long tons) while submerged. She had a total length of 67.10 m (220 ft 2 in), a pressure hull length of 50.50 m (165 ft 8 in), an overall beam of 6.20 m (20 ft 4 in), a height of 9.60 m (31 ft 6 in), and a draught of 4.74 m (15 ft 7 in). The submarine was powered by two Germaniawerft F46 four-stroke, six-cylinder supercharged diesel engines producing a total of 2,800 to 3,200 metric horsepower (2,060 to 2,350 kW; 2,760 to 3,160 shp) for use while surfaced, two BBC GG UB 720/8 double-acting electric motors producing a total of 750 metric horsepower (550 kW; 740 shp) for use while submerged. She had two shafts and two 1.23 m (4 ft) propellers. The boat was capable of operating at depths of up to 230 metres (750 ft).

The submarine had a maximum surface speed of 17.7 knots (32.8 km/h; 20.4 mph) and a maximum submerged speed of 7.6 knots (14.1 km/h; 8.7 mph). When submerged, the boat could operate for 80 nautical miles (150 km; 92 mi) at 4 knots (7.4 km/h; 4.6 mph); when surfaced, she could travel 8,500 nautical miles (15,700 km; 9,800 mi) at 10 knots (19 km/h; 12 mph). U-1003 was fitted with five 53.3 cm (21 in) torpedo tubes (four fitted at the bow and one at the stern), fourteen torpedoes or 26 TMA or TMB Naval mines, one 8.8 cm (3.46 in) SK C/35 naval gun, (220 rounds), one 3.7 cm (1.5 in) Flak M42 and two 2 cm (0.79 in) C/30 anti-aircraft guns. The boat had a complement of between forty-four and fifty-two.

== Service history ==
U-1003 participated in two war patrol which resulted in no ships damaged or sunk.

On 7 February 1944, during U-1003's trials, a crewman fell overboard and died while transferring to an outpost boat, near Hela on the Baltic Sea.

U-1003 had Schnorchel underwater-breathing apparatus fitted out sometime before October 1944.

U-1003 departed Bergen, Norway on 9 February, on her second, and last, war patrol. On 20 March 1945, thirty days into her patrol, her snorkel was spotted by HMCS New Glasgow off her port bow. New Glasgow had started preparations for a depth charge attack when she herself was damaged just below the bridge upon colliding with U-1003. Fourteen Allied ships, from Escort Groups C-4, C-25, and C-26, began a massive search for the heavily damaged U-boat but U-1003 managed to elude them. She then sat on the bottom for another 48 hours for repairs, however, on 23 March, the severe damage to the boat forced her crew to scuttle her off the coast of Ireland. Of the 48 men onboard U-1003, 33 were picked up by HMCS Thetford Mines, two of which died and were buried at sea. Oblt.z.S. Werner Strübing and the remaining 14 crew members were lost.

The wreck now lies at 55°38′N 7°26′W.

== See also ==
- Battle of the Atlantic

== Bibliography ==
- Busch, Rainer; Röll, Hans-Joachim (1999). German U-boat commanders of World War II : a biographical dictionary. Translated by Brooks, Geoffrey. London, Annapolis, Md: Greenhill Books, Naval Institute Press. ISBN 1-55750-186-6.
- Busch, Rainer; Röll, Hans-Joachim (1999). Deutsche U-Boot-Verluste von September 1939 bis Mai 1945 [German U-boat losses from September 1939 to May 1945]. Der U-Boot-Krieg (in German). Vol. IV. Hamburg, Berlin, Bonn: Mittler. ISBN 3-8132-0514-2.
- Gröner, Erich; Jung, Dieter; Maass, Martin (1991). German Warships 1815–1945, U-boats and Mine Warfare Vessels. Vol. 2. Translated by Thomas, Keith; Magowan, Rachel. London: Conway Maritime Press. ISBN 0-85177-593-4.
