= JDS Takanami =

Ayanami-class destroyer

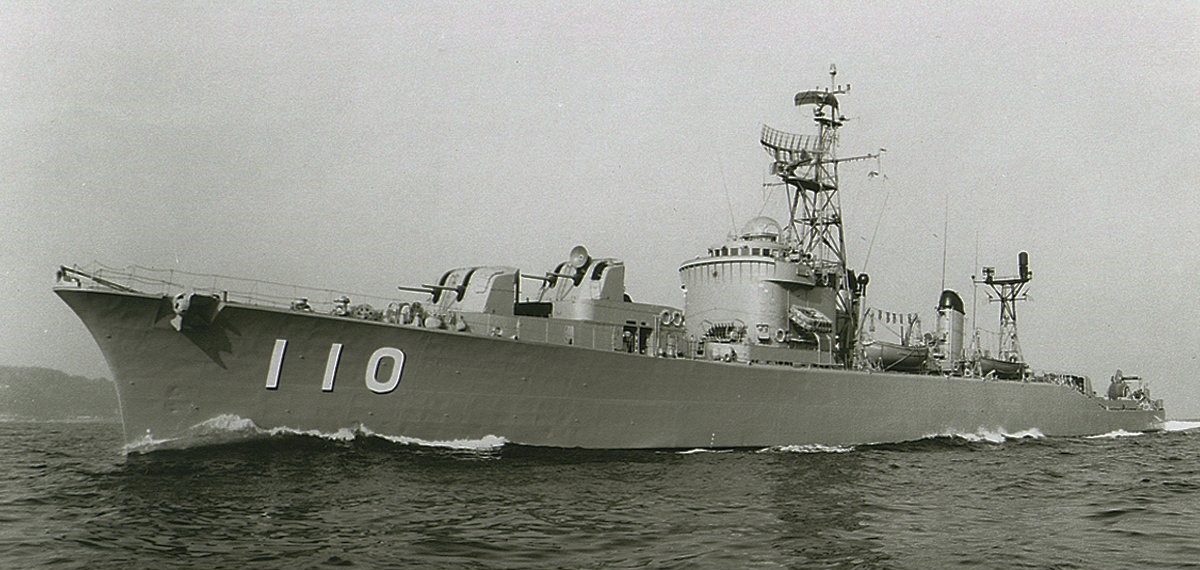
- JDS Takanami

History

Japan
- Name: Takanami; (たかなみ)
- Namesake: Takanami (1942)
- Ordered: 1957
- Builder: Mitsui, Tamano
- Laid down: 8 November 1958
- Launched: 8 August 1959
- Commissioned: 30 January 1960
- Decommissioned: 1 March 1989
- Reclassified: ASU-7009
- Home port: Sasebo
- Identification: Pennant number: DD-110
- Fate: Scrapped

General characteristics
- Class & type: Ayanami-class destroyer
- Displacement: 1,720 t (1,690 long tons) standard; 2,500 t (2,500 long tons) full load
- Length: 109 m (358 ft)
- Beam: 10.7 m (35 ft)
- Depth: 8.1 m (26 ft 7 in)
- Complement: 220
- Armament: 6 × 3"/50 caliber Mk.22 guns; 4 × 533 mm (21 in) torpedo tubes; 2 × ASW torpedo racks; 2 × Hedgehog anti-submarine mortars; 2 × DCT (K-guns)

JDS Takanami (DD-110) was the fifth ship of Ayanami-class destroyers.

== Construction and career ==
Takanami was laid down at Mitsui Engineering & Shipbuilding Tamano Shipyard on 8 November 1958 and launched on 8 August 1959. She was commissioned on 30 January 1960.

On 31 August 1960, he was transferred to the 11th Escort Corps, which was newly formed under the Kure District Force, together with JDS Ōnami.

On 1 February 1961, the 11th Escort Corps was reorganized under the Self-Defense Fleet and under the 2nd Escort Group.

In February 1968, two depth charge projectors on the rear deck and two depth charge drop rails were removed, and equipped with Variable Depth Sonar (VDS) OQA-1A.

On 1 February 1971, the 11th Escort Squadron was reorganized into the 4th Escort Squadron, which was newly formed under the escort fleet.

On 16 December 1973, the 11th Escort Corps was reorganized under the 3rd Escort Corps group, and the home port was transferred to Sasebo.

On 1 December 1977, the 11th Escort Corps was reorganized under the Sasebo District Force.

On 27 March 1985, the type was changed to a special service ship, the ship registration number was changed to ASU-7009, and it was transferred to the Sasebo District Force as a ship under direct control.

She was removed from the register on 24 March 1989.
