= JDS Ōnami =

Ayanami-class destroyer

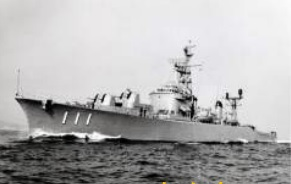
- JDS Ōnami

History

Japan
- Name: Ōnami; (おおなみ)
- Namesake: Ōnami (1942)
- Ordered: 1958
- Builder: IHI, Kobe
- Laid down: 20 March 1959
- Launched: 13 February 1960
- Commissioned: 29 August 1960
- Decommissioned: 1 March 1990
- Reclassified: ASU-7013
- Home port: Sasebo
- Identification: Pennant number: DD-111
- Fate: Scrapped

General characteristics
- Class & type: Ayanami-class destroyer
- Displacement: 1,720 t (1,690 long tons) standard; 2,500 t (2,500 long tons) full load
- Length: 109 m (358 ft)
- Beam: 10.7 m (35 ft)
- Depth: 8.1 m (26 ft 7 in)
- Complement: 220
- Armament: 6 × 3"/50 caliber Mk.22 guns; 4 × 533 mm (21 in) torpedo tubes; 2 × ASW torpedo racks; 2 × Hedgehog anti-submarine mortars; 2 × DCT (K-guns)

JDS Ōnami (DD-111) was the sixth ship of Ayanami-class destroyers.

== Construction and career ==
Ōnami was laid down at IHI Corporation Kobe Shipyard on 20 March 1959 and launched on 13 February 1960. She was commissioned on 29 August 1960.

On 31 August 1960, she was transferred to the 11th Escort Corps, which was newly formed under the Kure District Force, together with JDS Takanami.

On 1 February 1961, the 11th Escort Corps was reorganized under the Self-Defense Fleet and under the 2nd Escort Group.

On 1 February 1971, the 11th Escort Squadron was reorganized into the 4th Escort Squadron, which was newly formed under the escort fleet.

On 16 December 1973, the 11th Escort Corps was reorganized under the 3rd Escort Corps group, and the fixed port was transferred to Sasebo.

On 1 December 1977, the 11th Escort Corps was reorganized under the Sasebo District Force.

In 1980, the short torpedo launcher was removed, and anti-submarine attack capability enhancement work was carried out to equip two 68-type triple short torpedo launchers.

On 20 February 1987, the 11th Escort Corps was abolished, the type was changed to a special service ship, and the ship registration number was changed to ASU-7013. She was transferred to the Sasebo District Force as a ship under direct control.

She was removed on 23 March 1990.
