= HMCS New Glasgow =

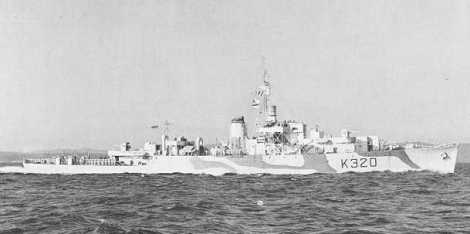
- HMCS New Glasgow

History

Canada
- Name: New Glasgow
- Namesake: New Glasgow, Nova Scotia
- Ordered: April 1942
- Builder: Yarrows Ltd., Esquimalt
- Yard number: 86
- Laid down: 2 December 1942
- Launched: 23 June 1943
- Commissioned: 22 December 1943
- Decommissioned: 4 November 1945
- Identification: Pennant number: K320
- Motto: Be worthy
- Recommissioned: 30 January 1954
- Decommissioned: 30 January 1967
- Reclassified: Prestonian-class frigate
- Identification: pennant number: FFE 315
- Motto: "Dum cano cavete"
- Honours and awards: Atlantic, 1944-1945
- Fate: Sold, broken up Japan 1967
- Badge: Argent, on base barry wavy of five azure and argent, the hull of an ancient boat midship on which an oak tree with a red-breast on the tree-top all proper, a signet ring erect or on the forward deck and an ancient hand-bell proper on the after deck.

General characteristics
- Class & type: River-class frigate
- Displacement: 1,445 long tons (1,468 t; 1,618 short tons); 2,110 long tons (2,140 t; 2,360 short tons) (deep load)
- Length: 283 ft (86.26 m) p/p; 301.25 ft (91.82 m)o/a
- Beam: 36.5 ft (11.13 m)
- Draught: 9 ft (2.74 m); 13 ft (3.96 m) (deep load)
- Propulsion: 2 × Admiralty 3-drum boilers, 2 shafts, reciprocating vertical triple expansion, 5,500 ihp (4,100 kW)
- Speed: 20 knots (37.0 km/h); 20.5 knots (38.0 km/h) (turbine ships)
- Range: 646 long tons (656 t; 724 short tons) oil fuel; 7,500 nautical miles (13,890 km) at 15 knots (27.8 km/h)
- Complement: 157
- Armament: 2 × single QF 4 in (102 mm) /40 Mk.XIX guns; 1 × QF 12 pounder 76 mm (3.0 in)) 12 cwt /40 Mk. V on mounting HA/LA Mk.IX (not all ships); 8 × 20 mm QF Oerlikon A/A on twin mounts Mk.V; 1 × Hedgehog 24 spigot A/S projector; up to 150 depth charges

HMCS New Glasgow was a River-class frigate that served in the Royal Canadian Navy during the Second World War and as a Prestonian-class frigate from 1955 to 1965. She was named for New Glasgow, Nova Scotia.

New Glasgow was ordered in April 1942 as part of the 1943–1944 River-class building program. She was laid down on 2 December 1942 by Yarrows Ltd. at Esquimalt and launched 23 June 1943. New Glasgow was commissioned into the RCN at the Esquimalt naval base on 23 December 1943 with the pennant K320.

== Background ==
The River-class frigate was designed by William Reed of Smith's Dock Company of South Bank-on-Tees. Originally called a "twin-screw corvette", its purpose was to improve on the convoy escort classes in service with the Royal Navy at the time, including the Flower-class corvette. The first orders were placed by the Royal Navy in 1940 and the vessels were named for rivers in the United Kingdom, giving name to the class. In Canada they were named for towns and cities though they kept the same designation. The name "frigate" was suggested by Vice-Admiral Percy Nelles of the Royal Canadian Navy and was adopted later that year.

Improvements over the corvette design included improved accommodation which was markedly better. The twin engines gave only three more knots of speed but extended the range of the ship to nearly double that of a corvette at 7,200 nautical miles (13,300 km) at 12 knots. Among other lessons applied to the design was an armament package better designed to combat U-boats including a twin 4-inch mount forward and 12-pounder aft. 15 Canadian frigates were initially fitted with a single 4-inch gun forward but with the exception of HMCS Valleyfield, they were all eventually upgraded to the double mount. For underwater targets, the River-class frigate was equipped with a Hedgehog anti-submarine mortar and depth charge rails aft and four side-mounted throwers.

River-class frigates were the first Royal Canadian Navy warships to carry the 147B Sword horizontal fan echo sonar transmitter in addition to the irregular ASDIC. This allowed the ship to maintain contact with targets even while firing unless a target was struck. Improved radar and direction-finding equipment improved the RCN's ability to find and track enemy submarines over the previous classes.

Canada originally ordered the construction of 33 frigates in October 1941. The design was too big for the shipyards on the Great Lakes so all the frigates built in Canada were built in dockyards along the west coast or along the St. Lawrence River. In all Canada ordered the construction of 60 frigates including ten for the Royal Navy that transferred two to the United States Navy.

== Service history ==
New Glasgow transited from Esquimalt to Halifax, Nova Scotia via the Panama Canal, arriving at HMC Dockyard, Halifax on 17 February 1944 under command of Lt. Cdr. G.S. Hall, RCNR. After working up at Bermuda, New Glasgow was assigned to the Mid-Ocean Escort Force (MOEF) escort group C-1. She was employed on trans-Atlantic convoy duty for the next five months. In September 1944 she transferred to escort group EG 26, based out of Derry in the United Kingdom. Early in 1945, she was temporarily assigned to Portsmouth and Plymouth commands.

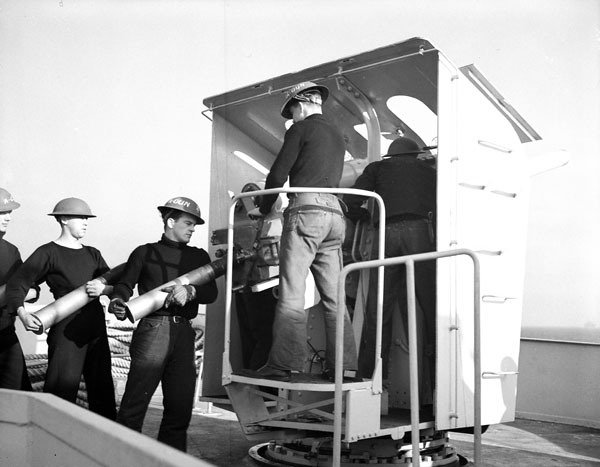
New Glasgow's gunners loading a QF 4-inch Mk XIX gun off British Columbia, circa 1944

On 20 March 1945, New Glasgow was responsible for the loss of the last U-boat by an RCN warship during the Second World War. On that day she was operating off Londonderry Port, Northern Ireland when the snorkel of a U-boat was observed near the ship's bow. Before depth charges could be dropped, the vessels collided, with each side claiming to have rammed the other.

Both vessels were badly damaged. The U-boat, later revealed to be U-1003 quickly dived while New Glasgow limped to Londonderry Port with a broken propeller and other hull damage. Meanwhile, the Allies tasked a 14-ship naval task force comprising Escort Groups C-4, 25 and 26 to find the U-boat, without success. Two days later, on 23 March 1945, the U-boat was scuttled in the Northern Channel a few miles north of Inistrahull Beacon (Malin Head), Ireland. The commander and 16 crew members died as a result of the incident. The 31 surviving crew members were rescued by Escort Group 25. The wreck of U-1003 was discovered by nautical archaeologist Innes McCartney in 2001. The attack periscope was found to have been extended, along with the schnorchel. The mast had broken off and the periscope was bent so badly that it actually pointed downwards. New Glasgow remained in port under repair until 5 June 1945.

New Glasgow returned to Canada and was decommissioned by the RCN and placed in reserve at Shelburne, Nova Scotia on 4 November 1945.

=== Postwar service ===
New Glasgow underwent conversion to a Prestonian-class frigate in 1953–1955. This meant a flush-decked appearance aft, with a larger bridge and taller funnel. Her hull forward was strengthened against ice and the quarterdeck was enclosed to contain two Squid anti-submarine mortars. She was recommissioned with pennant FFE 315 on 30 January 1954, the first of the rebuilt frigates assigned to the West Coast. On 1 January 1955, New Glasgow was assigned to the Second Canadian Escort Squadron of Pacific Command. In November 1955, the Second Canadian Escort Squadron was among the Canadian units that took part in one of the largest naval exercises since the Second World War off the coast of California.

During service with the Fourth Canadian Escort Squadron she was fitted with a midship deckhouse to provide classroom and training facilities for officer candidates. New Glasgow was a member of the Fourth Canadian Escort Squadron based out of Esquimalt, British Columbia. In June 1960 the Fourth Canadian Escort Squadron performed a training tour of the Pacific, with stops at Yokohama, Japan, Midway Atoll and Pearl Harbor. They returned to Canada in August. From January to March 1961, Sussexvale, New Glasgow and Beacon Hill performed a training cruise to the South Pacific, visiting Hawaii, Fiji, New Zealand, Australia and Samoa.

She served in a training capacity until being paid off by the RCN at Esquimalt on 30 January 1967. She was sold and broken up in Japan later that year.

== See also ==
- List of ships of the Canadian Navy
