= List of ships of the Royal Canadian Navy =

The Royal Navy was responsible for all of British North America, until Canadian Confederation in 1867. After Confederation the Royal Navy increasingly shared naval responsibilities with Canada but retained sole responsibility for other British colonies in North America, until they joined Canada. In 1910, the Department of the Naval Service was created to consolidate all naval services in Canada, receiving royal assent in 1911 to become the Royal Canadian Navy. Within a few years many of the non-military naval services and vessels integrated under the RCN were returned to their original departments. The list of ships of the Royal Canadian Navy contains the surface warships, submarines and auxiliary vessels in service from 1910 up to the early 1990s. This includes all commissioned, non-commissioned, loaned or hired ships in service within the RCN. Ships in this list also include Royal Navy vessels with RCN crews, such as TR-series minesweepers of the First World War, and aircraft carriers of the Second World War.

The list is ordered into sections by the year when the vessel in question was commissioned into Canadian naval service the first time.

== Commissioned 1910–22 ==
Ensign of Canadian government ships from 1865 to 1911

The Canadian navy was created in 1910 as the Department of the Naval Service. The Naval Service integrated other marine arms of the government of Canada with which it had a common professional background and the objective of security in the Canadian maritime environment and national sovereignty. In addition to a combat capability, the naval service included the Fisheries Protection, Hydrographic Survey, tidal observation and wireless telegraph branches. Each branch, including the quasi-military Fisheries Protection, contributed their fleet of ships to the new Naval Service. The service thereby commanded a number of Canadian Government Ships (CGS) ships in addition to the two purchased Royal Navy warships. Initially, eight fisheries cruisers (under the command of Rear Admiral Charles Kingsmill), were brought into the Department of the Naval Service, including CGS Vigilant, the first modern warship built in the country. (Note: Data for force level, ship names and commissions are found in various sources, including Gilbert 1952, The Navy List all years, Blatherwick 1992, Gimlet and Hadley 2010)

With the outbreak of the First World War government and commercial vessels were pressed into naval service. Great Britain and Canada planned to significantly expand the RCN but decided that Canadian men could enlist the Royal Navy or the RCN with many choosing the former. Following the demobilization after the war, the RCN undertook many of the civilian responsibilities of the Department of Transport.

=== Cruisers ===
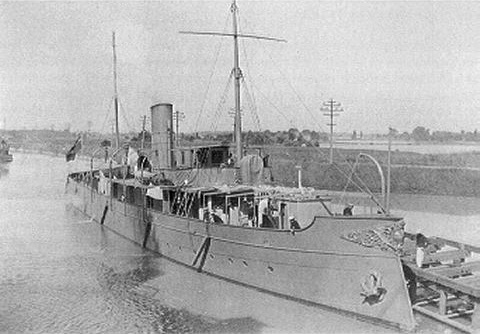
HMCS Vigilant, the first purpose-built warship in Canada

- HMCS Rainbow (the RCN's first ship, Apollo class)
- HMCS Niobe (the RCN's second ship, Diadem class)
- HMCS Aurora (Arethusa class)

=== Destroyers ===
- HMCS Patriot (Thornycroft M class)
- HMCS Patrician (Thornycroft M class)

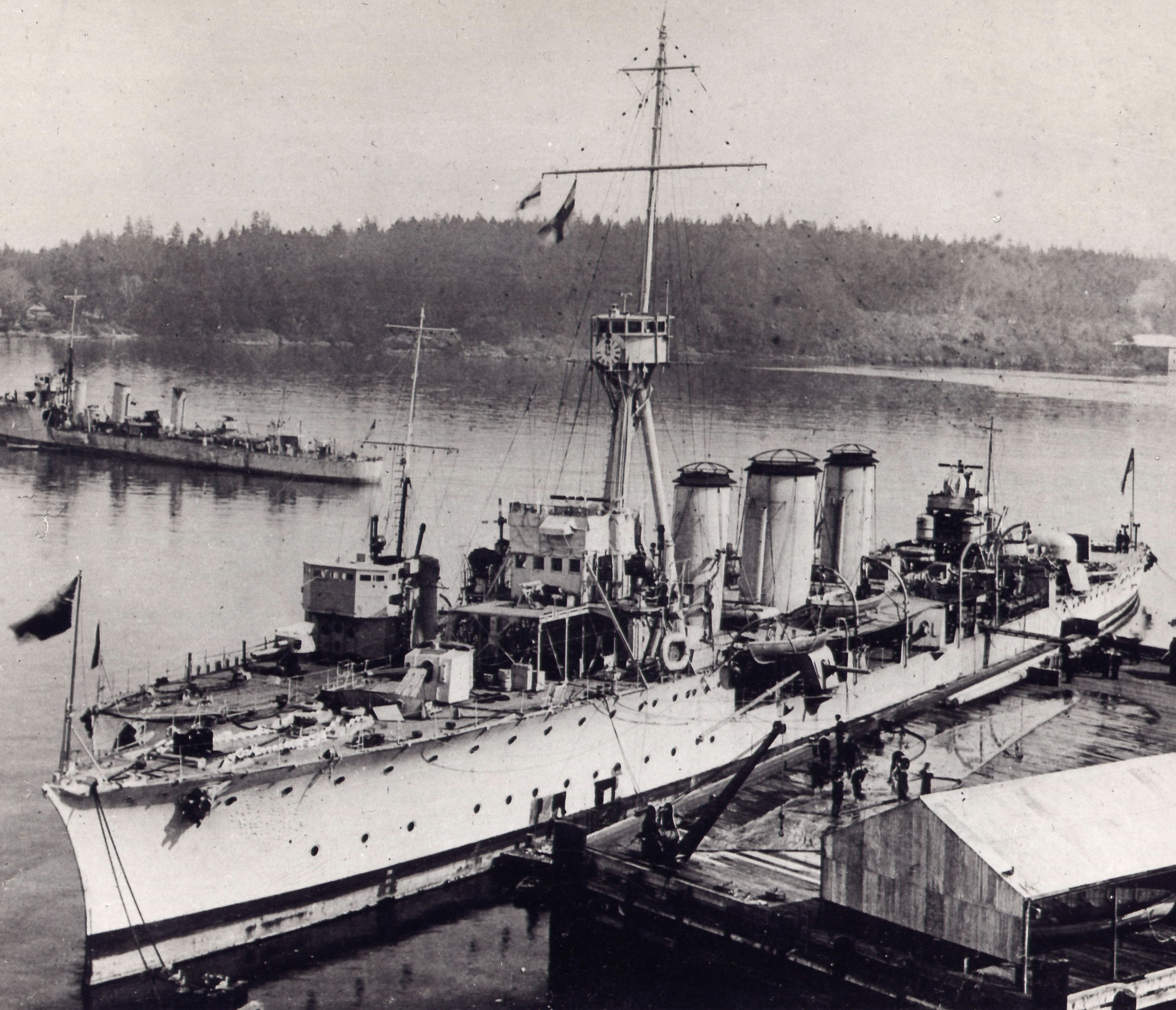
Cruiser HMCS Aurora dockside, with destroyers Patriot and Patrician nearby, at HMC Dockyard Esquimalt, British Columbia (1921)

=== Submarines ===
- HMCS CC-1 (CC class)
- HMCS CC-2 (CC class)
- HMCS CH-14 (H class)
- HMCS CH-15 (H class)

=== Trawlers ===
- HMCS Arleux (Battle class)
- HMCS Armentières (Battle class)
- HMCS Arras (Battle class)
- HMCS Festubert (Battle class)
- HMCS Givenchy (Battle class)
- HMCS Loos (Battle class)
- HMCS Messines (Battle class)
- HMCS St. Eloi (Battle class)
- HMCS St. Julien (Battle class)
- HMCS Thiepval (Battle class)
- HMCS Vimy (Battle class)
- HMCS Ypres (Battle class)

=== Minesweepers ===
- HMCS Baleine
- HMCS Constance
- HMCS Curlew
- HMCS P.V. I (PV type)
- HMCS P.V. II (PV type)
- HMCS P.V. III (PV type)
- HMCS P.V. IV (PV type)
- HMCS P.V. V (PV type)
- HMCS P.V. VI (PV type)
- HMCS P.V. VII (PV type)
- HMCS TR 1 (Castle class TR series)
- HMCS TR 2 (Castle class)
- HMCS TR 3 (Castle class)
- HMCS TR 4 (Castle class)
- HMCS TR 5 (Castle class)
- HMCS TR 6 (Castle class)
- HMCS TR 7 (Castle class)
- HMCS TR 8 (Castle class)
- HMCS TR 9 (Castle class)
- HMCS TR 10 (Castle class)
- HMCS TR 11 (Castle class)
- HMCS TR 12 (Castle class)
- HMCS TR 13 (Castle class)
- HMCS TR 14 (Castle class)
- HMCS TR 15 (Castle class)
- HMCS TR 16 (Castle class)
- HMCS TR 17 (Castle class)
- HMCS TR 18 (Castle class)
- HMCS TR 19 (Castle class)
- HMCS TR 20 (Castle class)
- HMCS TR 21 (Castle class)
- HMCS TR 22 (Castle class)
- HMCS TR 23 (Castle class)
- HMCS TR 24 (Castle class)
- HMCS TR 25 (Castle class)
- HMCS TR 26 (Castle class)
- HMCS TR 27 (Castle class)
- HMCS TR 28 (Castle class)
- HMCS TR 29 (Castle class)
- HMCS TR 30 (Castle class)
- HMCS TR 31 (Castle class)
- HMCS TR 32 (Castle class)
- HMCS TR 33 (Castle class)
- HMCS TR 34 (Castle class)
- HMCS TR 35 (Castle class)
- HMCS TR 36 (Castle class)
- HMCS TR 37 (Castle class)
- HMCS TR 38 (Castle class)
- HMCS TR 39 (Castle class)
- HMCS TR 46 (Castle class)
- HMCS TR 47 (Castle class)
- HMCS TR 48 (Castle class)
- HMCS TR 49 (Castle class)
- HMCS TR 50 (Castle class)
- HMCS TR 51 (Castle class)
- HMCS TR 52 (Castle class)
- HMCS TR 53 (Castle class)
- HMCS TR 54 (Castle class)
- HMCS TR 55 (Castle class)
- HMCS TR 56 (Castle class)
- HMCS TR 57 (Castle class)
- HMCS TR 58 (Castle class)
- HMCS TR 59 (Castle class)
- HMCS TR 60 (Castle class)

=== Torpedo boats ===
- HMCS Tuna (ex-Tarantula)

=== Hospital ship ===
- HMCHS Prince George

=== Auxiliary and other ===
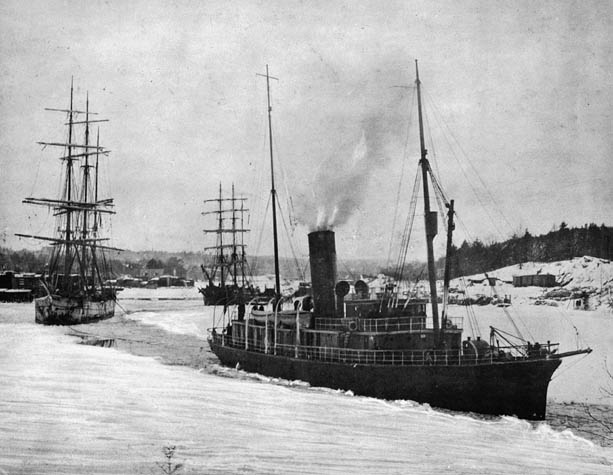
CGS Stanley escorting two vessels through ice. Date unknown.

==== Icebreakers ====
- HMCS Earl Grey
- HMCS Minto
- HMCS Stanley

==== Training vessels ====
- HMCS Arthur W

==== Motor launches ====
- Adelaide
- Alase
- Alva and May
- Amos B.
- Atlantic
- Fantom
- Foam (late Spray)
- Icthus M.
- Lilly
- Lillian
- Maude Mosher
- Meredith
- Mildred
- Mohawk
- Paragon
- Rambler
- Roanoke
- Roamer
- Rose
- Rover
- Ruth
- Shark
- Shamrock
- Swan
- Thistle
- Virginia

==== Patrol boats ====
- HMCS Acadia (2)
- Albacore
- HMCS Algerine (later, depot ship)
- Frank T. Coote
- Atlanta (III)
- CGS Bayfield
- HMCS Canada
- Deliverance
- HMCS Florence
- HMCS Galiano
- Grib
- HMCS Grilse (ex-Winchester)
- HMCS Gulnare
- HMCS Hochelaga
- HMCS Lady Evelyn
- HMCS Lansdowne
- HMCS Laurentian
- HMCS Malaspina
- HMCS Margaret
- HMCS Newington (minelayer)
- HMCS Petrel
- HMCS Premier
- HMCS Restless
- HMCS Sable I
- HMCS Seagull
- HMCS Sinmac
- HMCS Stadacona
- HMCS CD 1 (CD class)
- HMCS CD 2 (CD class)
- HMCS CD 3 (CD class)
- HMCS CD 5 (CD class)
- HMCS CD 6 (CD class)
- HMCS CD 7 (CD class)
- HMCS CD 8 (CD class)
- HMCS CD 10 (CD class)
- HMCS CD 11 (CD class)
- HMCS CD 12 (CD class)
- HMCS CD 13 (CD class)
- HMCS CD 14 (CD class)
- HMCS CD 15 (CD class)
- HMCS CD 16 (CD class)
- HMCS CD 17 (CD class)
- HMCS CD 18 (CD class)
- HMCS CD 19 (CD class)
- HMCS CD 20 (CD class)
- HMCS CD 21 (CD class)
- HMCS CD 22 (CD class)
- HMCS CD 23 (CD class)
- HMCS CD 24 (CD class)
- HMCS CD 25 (CD class)
- HMCS CD 26 (CD class)
- HMCS CD 27 (CD class)
- HMCS CD 28 (CD class)
- HMCS CD 29 (CD class)
- HMCS CD 30 (CD class, transferred to USN)
- HMCS CD 31 (CD class, transferred to USN)
- HMCS CD 32 (CD class, transferred to USN)
- HMCS CD 33 (CD class, transferred to USN)
- HMCS CD 34 (CD class, transferred to USN)
- HMCS CD 35 (CD class, transferred to USN)
- HMCS CD 36 (CD class, transferred to USN)
- HMCS CD 37 (CD class)
- HMCS CD 38 (CD class)
- HMCS CD 39 (CD class)
- HMCS CD 40 (CD class)
- HMCS CD 41 (CD class, transferred to USN)
- HMCS CD 42 (CD class)
- HMCS CD 43 (CD class)
- HMCS CD 44 (CD class)
- HMCS CD 45 (CD class)
- HMCS CD 46 (CD class, transferred to USN)
- HMCS CD 47 (CD class)
- HMCS CD 48 (CD class)
- HMCS CD 49 (CD class)
- HMCS CD 50 (CD class, transferred to USN)
- HMCS CD 51 (CD class)
- HMCS CD 52 (CD class)
- HMCS CD 53 (CD class)
- HMCS CD 54 (CD class)
- HMCS CD 55 (CD class)
- HMCS CD 56 (CD class)
- HMCS CD 57 (CD class)
- HMCS CD 58 (CD class, transferred to USN)
- HMCS CD 59 (CD class, transferred to USN)
- HMCS CD 60 (CD class)
- HMCS CD 61 (CD class, transferred to USN)
- HMCS CD 62 (CD class)
- HMCS CD 63 (CD class)
- HMCS CD 64 (CD class)
- HMCS CD 65 (CD class, transferred to USN)
- HMCS CD 66 (CD class)
- HMCS CD 67 (CD class, transferred to USN)
- HMCS CD 68 (CD class)
- HMCS CD 69 (CD class)
- HMCS CD 70 (CD class)
- HMCS CD 71 (CD class)
- HMCS CD 72 (CD class)
- HMCS CD 73 (CD class)
- HMCS CD 74 (CD class)
- HMCS CD 75 (CD class)
- HMCS CD 76 (CD class)
- HMCS CD 77 (CD class)
- HMCS CD 78 (CD class, transferred to USN)
- HMCS CD 79 (CD class)
- HMCS CD 80 (CD class)
- HMCS CD 81 (CD class)
- HMCS CD 82 (CD class)
- HMCS CD 83 (CD class)
- HMCS CD 84 (CD class)
- HMCS CD 85 (CD class)
- HMCS CD 86 (CD class)
- HMCS CD 87 (CD class)
- HMCS CD 88 (CD class)
- HMCS CD 89 (CD class)
- HMCS CD 90 (CD class)
- HMCS CD 91 (CD class)
- HMCS CD 92 (CD class)
- HMCS CD 93 (CD class)
- HMCS CD 94 (CD class, transferred to USN)
- HMCS CD 95 (CD class)
- HMCS CD 96 (CD class, transferred to USN)
- HMCS CD 97 (CD class, transferred to USN)
- HMCS CD 98 (CD class, transferred to USN)
- HMCS CD 99 (CD class, transferred to USN)
- HMCS CD 100 (CD class, transferred to USN)

==== Survey vessels ====
- Karluk
- CGS Chrissie C. Thomey
- Gladiator
- CGS La Canadienne
- CGS Mary Sachs
- CGS North Star (III)

==== Tenders ====
- Davy Jones
- Egret (I)
- Holly Leaf
- Ivy Leaf
- Kipawo
- Laurel Leaf
- HMCS Shearwater
- Tannis
- Valiant (I)
- Viking (ex-CGS Viking)
- Viner

==== Tugs ====
- Alaska (II)
- C.E. Tanner
- Coastguard
- G.S. Mayes
- Gwennith
- Highland Mary (I)
- Ruth (II)
- Shark (ex-Nereid (II))
- Trusty
- M.W. Weatherspoon
- C. Wilfred

==== Other ====
- CGS Alaska
- Berthier (examination vessel)
- Speedy (II) (examination vessel)
- HMCS Gate Vessel 3 (ex-W.H. Lee)
- HMCS Gopher (auxiliary minesweeper)
- HMCS Musquash (auxiliary minesweeper)
- CGS Vigilant (cruiser, third class)
- Falcon
- CGS Kestrel
- HMCS Naden (depot ship)
- Ruth (I)
- Ruth (IV)
- Scotsman

== Commissioned 1922–47 ==
Royal Canadian Navy ensign 1911 to 1965

The Department of the Naval Service was replaced in 1922 by the Department of National Defence. The Fisheries Protection, Hydrographic Survey, tidal observation and wireless telegraph branches, along with many ships, were transferred to other government departments and delisted by the RCN. In 1931, the RCN commissioned HMCS Saguenay and HMCS Skeena, the first ships specifically built for the service. While a large "Fisherman's Reserve" was formed in 1938, at the outbreak of the Second World War, the RCN had been reduced to six River-class destroyers, five minesweepers, two small training vessels bases at Halifax and Victoria, 145 officers and 1,674 seamen. The RCN expanded rapidly during the Second World War, with vessels transferred or purchased from the Royal Navy and US Navy and the construction of many vessels in Canada, such as corvettes and frigates. The RCN ended the war with a fleet of approximately 950 ships, the third-largest navy in the world and an operational reach extending into the Atlantic, Pacific, Caribbean and Mediterranean. Due to the terms of the Lend Lease agreements between the United States and the United Kingdom, a few of the US built vessels that were crewed by the RCN remained under the "HMS" designation of the Royal Navy (RN); the two "HMS" aircraft carriers were mixed crews, as the RCN crewed the ship, while the air crews were provided by the RN's Fleet Air Arm.

=== Aircraft carriers ===
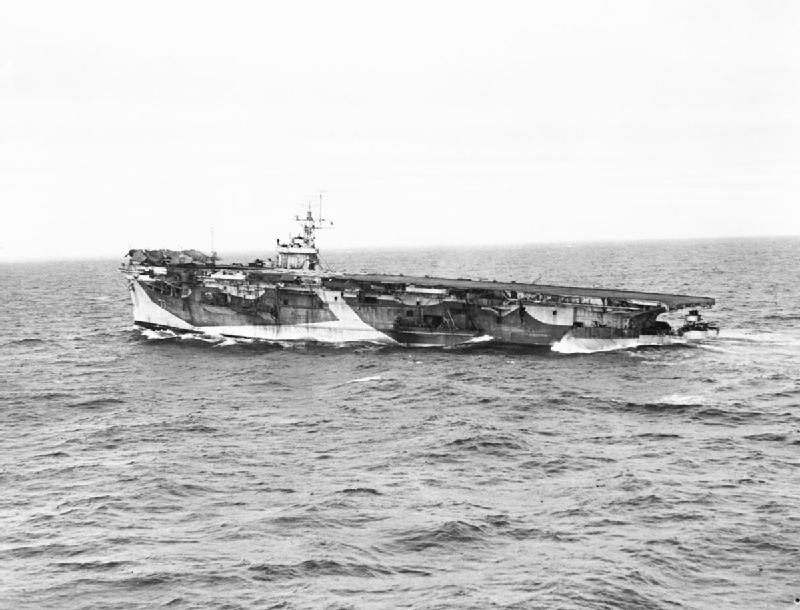
Nabob returning home after being torpedoed in August 1944

- HMS Nabob (D77) (Ruler class)
- HMS Puncher (D79) (Ruler class)
- HMCS Warrior (R31) (Colossus class)

=== Cruisers ===
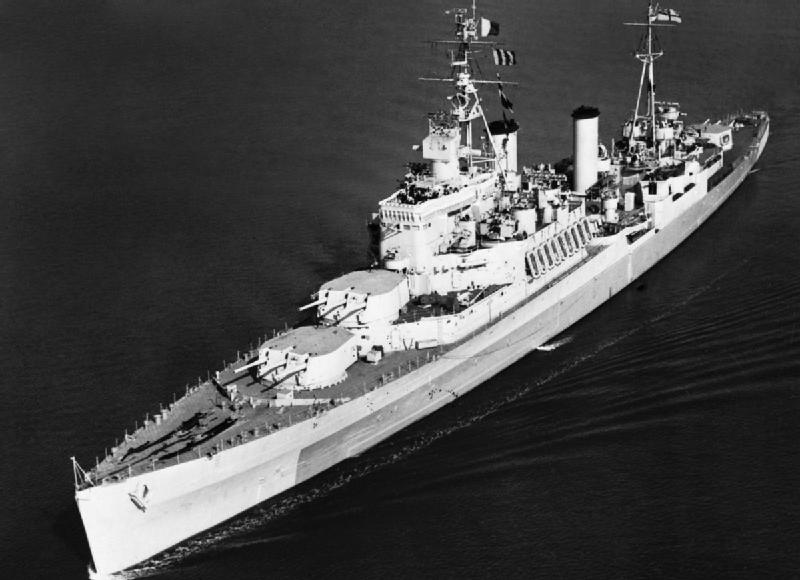
Cruiser HMCS Uganda underway in 1944

==== Light cruisers ====
- HMCS Uganda (C66) (Crown Colony class, later renamed HMCS Quebec (C66))
- HMCS Ontario (C53) (Minotaur class)

==== Armed merchant cruisers ====
- HMCS Prince David (F89) (Prince class)
- HMCS Prince Henry (F70) (Prince class)
- HMCS Prince Robert (F56) (Prince class)

=== Destroyers ===
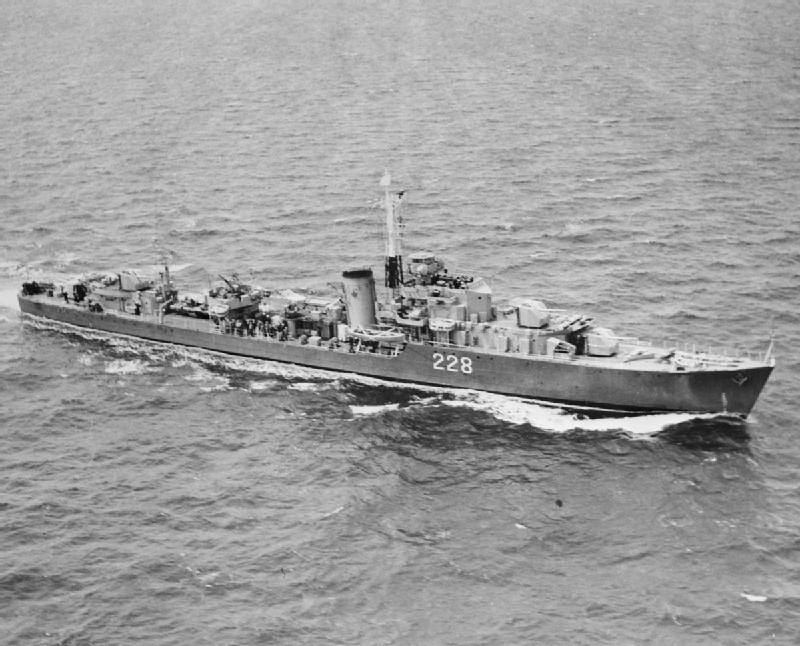
HMCS Crusader underway in 1946

- HMCS Saguenay (D79) (A class)
- HMCS Skeena (D59) (A class)
- HMCS Assiniboine (I18) (C class)
- HMCS Fraser (H48) (C class)
- HMCS Ottawa (H60) (C class)
- HMCS Restigouche (H00) (C class)
- HMCS St. Laurent (H83) (C class)
- HMCS Crescent (R16) (Cr class)
- HMCS Crusader (R20) (Cr class)
- HMCS Kootenay (H75) (D class)
- HMCS Margaree (H49) (D class)
- HMCS Gatineau (H61) (E class)
- HMCS Qu'Appelle (H69) (F class)
- HMCS Saskatchewan (H70) (F class)
- HMCS Ottawa (H31) (G class)
- HMCS Chaudière (H99) (H class)
- HMCS Annapolis (I04) (Wickes class)
- HMCS Columbia (I49) (Wickes class)
- HMCS Niagara (I57) (Wickes class)
- HMCS St. Clair (I65) (Wickes class)
- HMCS St. Croix (I81) (Clemson class)
- HMCS St. Francis (I93) (Clemson class)
- HMCS Champlain (1919) (S class)
- HMCS Vancouver (F6A) (S class)
- HMCS Athabaskan (G07) (Tribal class)
- HMCS Athabaskan (R79) (Tribal class)
- HMCS Cayuga (R04) (Tribal class)
- HMCS Haida (G63) (Tribal class)
- HMCS Huron (G24) (Tribal class)
- HMCS Iroquois (G89) (Tribal class)
- HMCS Micmac (R10) (Tribal class)
- HMCS Nootka (R96) (Tribal class)
- HMCS Algonquin (R17) (V class)
- HMCS Sioux (R64) (V class)
- HMS Buxton (H96) (Town class)*
- HMS Caldwell (I20) (Town class)*
- HMS Chelsea (I35) (Town class)*
- HMS Georgetown (I40) (Town class)*
- HMCS Hamilton (I24) (Town class)*
- HMS Leamington (G19) (Town class)*
- HMS Mansfield (G76) (Town class)*
- HMS Montgomery (G95) (Town class)*
- HMS Richmond (G88) (Town class)*
- HMS Salisbury (I52) (Town class)*

*(US Navy Wickes and Clemson-class vessels commissioned into the Royal Navy as Town class, and later loaned to the RCN. Some also commissioned into the RCN.)

=== Frigates ===
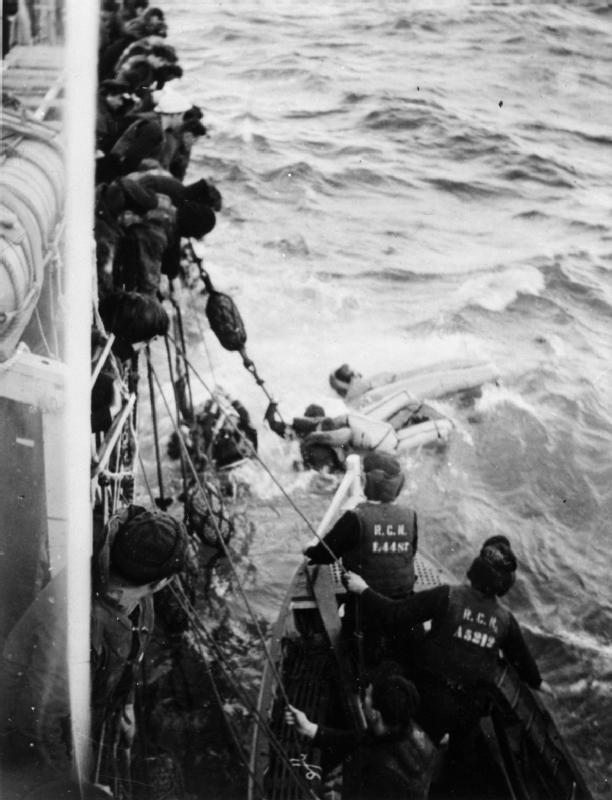
Frigate HMCS Swansea rescuing survivors of its second U-Boat kill. 1944

- HMCS Annan (K404) (River class)
- HMCS Antigonish (K661) (River class)
- HMCS Beacon Hill (K407) (River class)
- HMCS Buckingham (K685) (River class)
- HMCS Cap de la Madeleine (K663) (River class)
- HMCS Cape Breton (K350) (River class)
- HMCS Capilano (K409) (River class)
- HMCS Carlplace (K664) (River class)
- HMCS Charlottetown (K244) (River class)
- HMCS Chebogue (K317) (River class)
- HMCS Coaticook (K410) (River class)
- HMCS Dunver (K03) (River class)
- HMCS Eastview (K665) (River class)
- HMCS Ettrick (K254) (River class)
- HMCS Fort Erie (K670) (River class)
- HMCS Glace Bay (K414) (River class)
- HMCS Grou (K518) (River class)
- HMCS Hallowell (K666) (River class)
- HMCS Inch Arran (K667) (River class)
- HMCS Joliette (K418) (River class)
- HMCS Jonquiere (K318) (River class)
- HMCS Kirkland Lake (K337) (River class)
- HMCS Kokanee (K419) (River class)
- HMCS La Hulloise (K668) (River class)
- HMCS Lanark (K669) (River class)
- HMCS Lasalle (K519) (River class)
- HMCS Lauzon (K371) (River class)
- HMCS Levis (K400) (River class)
- HMCS Longueuil (K672) (River class)
- HMCS Magog (K673) (River class)
- HMCS Matane (K444) (River class)
- HMCS Meon (K269) (River class)
- HMCS Monnow (K441) (River class)
- HMCS Montreal (K319) (River class)
- HMCS Nene (K270) (River class)
- HMCS New Glasgow (K320) (River class)
- HMCS New Waterford (K321) (River class)
- HMCS Orkney (K448) (River class)
- HMCS Outremont (K322) (River class)
- HMCS Penetang (K676) (River class)
- HMCS Port Colborne (K326) (River class)
- HMCS Poundmaker (K675) (River class)
- HMCS Prestonian (K662) (River class)
- HMCS Prince Rupert (K324) (River class)
- HMCS Ribble (K525) (River class)
- HMCS Royal Mount (K677) (River class)
- HMCS Runnymede (K678) (River class)
- HMCS Sea Cliff (K344) (River class)
- HMCS Springhill (K323) (River class)
- HMCS St. Catharines (K325) (River class)
- HMCS Saint John (K456) (River class)
- HMCS St. Pierre (K680) (River class)
- HMCS St. Stephen (K454) (River class)
- HMCS Ste. Therese (K366) (River class)
- HMCS Stettler (K681) (River class)
- HMCS Stone Town (K531) (River class)
- HMCS Stormont (K327) (River class)
- HMCS Strathadam (K682) (River class)
- HMCS Sussexvale (K683) (River class)
- HMCS Swansea (K328) (River class)
- HMCS Teme (K458) (River class)
- HMCS Thetford Mines (K459) (River class)
- HMCS Toronto (K538) (River class)
- HMCS Valleyfield (K329) (River class)
- HMCS Victoriaville (K684) (River class)
- HMCS Waskesiu (K330) (River class)
- HMCS Wentworth (K331) (River class)
- HMCS Loch Achanalt (K424) (Loch class)
- HMCS Loch Alvie (K428) (Loch class)
- HMCS Loch Morlich (K517) (Loch class)

=== Corvettes ===
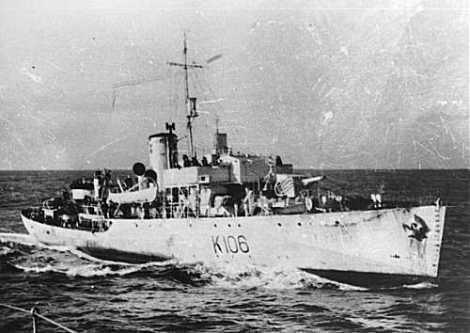
HMCS Edmundston (Flower class)

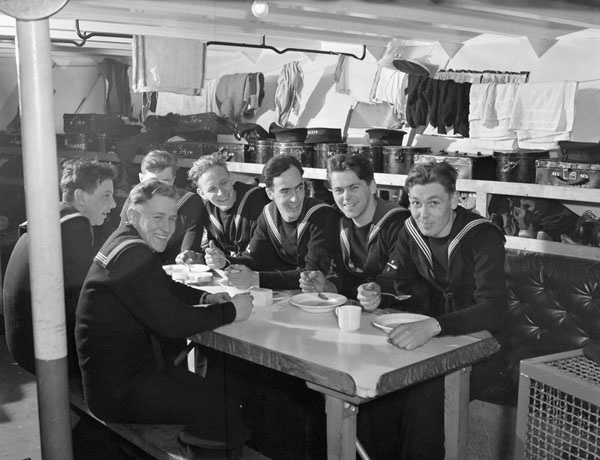
Mealtime aboard HMCS Agassiz

- HMCS Agassiz (K129) (Flower class)
- HMCS Alberni (K103) (Flower class)
- HMCS Algoma (K127) (Flower class)
- HMCS Amherst (K148) (Flower class)
- HMCS Arrowhead (K145) (Flower class)
- HMCS Arvida (K113) (Flower class)
- HMCS Asbestos (K358) (Flower class)
- HMCS Atholl (K15) (Flower class)
- HMCS Baddeck (K147) (Flower class)
- HMCS Barrie (K138) (Flower class)
- HMCS Battleford (K165) (Flower class)
- HMCS Beauharnois (K540) (Flower class)
- HMCS Belleville (K332) (Flower class)
- HMCS Bittersweet (K182) (Flower class)
- HMCS Brandon (K149) (Flower class)
- HMCS Brantford (K218) (Flower class)
- HMCS Buctouche (K179) (Flower class)
- HMCS Calgary (K231) (Flower class)
- HMCS Camrose (K154) (Flower class)
- HMCS Chambly (K116) (Flower class)
- HMCS Charlottetown (K244) (Flower class)
- HMCS Chicoutimi (K156) (Flower class)
- HMCS Chilliwack (K131) (Flower class)
- HMCS Cobalt (K124) (Flower class)
- HMCS Cobourg (K333) (Flower class)
- HMCS Collingwood (K180) (Flower class)
- HMCS Dauphin (K157) (Flower class)
- HMCS Dawson (K104) (Flower class)
- HMCS Drumheller (K167) (Flower class)
- HMCS Dundas (K229) (Flower class)
- HMCS Dunvegan (K177) (Flower class)
- HMCS Edmundston (K106) (Flower class)
- HMCS Eyebright (K150) (Flower class)
- HMCS Fennel (K194) (Flower class)
- HMCS Fergus (K686) (Flower class)
- HMCS Forrest Hill (K486) (Flower class)
- HMCS Fredericton (K245) (Flower class)
- HMCS Frontenac (K335) (Flower class)
- HMCS Galt (K163) (Flower class)
- HMCS Giffard (K402) (Flower class)
- HMCS Guelph (K687) (Flower class)
- HMCS Halifax (K237) (Flower class)
- HMCS Hawkesbury (K415) (Flower class)
- HMCS Hepatica (K159) (Flower class)
- HMCS Kamloops (K176) (Flower class)
- HMCS Kamsack (K171) (Flower class)
- HMCS Kenogami (K125) (Flower class)
- HMCS Kitchener (K225) (Flower class)
- HMCS La Malbaie (K273) (Flower class)
- HMCS Lachute (K440) (Flower class)
- HMCS Lethbridge (K160) (Flower class)
- HMCS Lévis (K115) (Flower class)
- HMCS Lindsay (K338) (Flower class)
- HMCS Long Branch (K487) (Flower class)
- HMCS Louisburg (K143) (Flower class)
- HMCS Louisburg (K401) (Flower class)
- HMCS Lunenburg (K151) (Flower class)
- HMCS Matapedia (K112) (Flower class)
- HMCS Mayflower (K191) (Flower class)
- HMCS Merrittonia (K688) (Flower class)
- HMCS Midland (K220) (Flower class)
- HMCS Mimico (K485) (Flower class)
- HMCS Moncton (K139) (Flower class)
- HMCS Moose Jaw (K164) (Flower class)
- HMCS Morden (K170) (Flower class)
- HMCS Nanaimo (K101) (Flower class)
- HMCS Napanee (K118) (Flower class)
- HMCS New Westminster (K228) (Flower class)
- HMCS Norsyd (K520) (Flower class)
- HMCS North Bay (K339) (Flower class)
- HMCS Oakville (K178) (Flower class)
- HMCS Orillia (K119) (Flower class)
- HMCS Owen Sound (K340) (Flower class)
- HMCS Parry Sound (K341) (Flower class)
- HMCS Peterborough (K342) (Flower class)
- HMCS Pictou (K146) (Flower class)
- HMCS Port Arthur (K233) (Flower class)
- HMCS Prescott (K161) (Flower class)
- HMCS Quesnel (K133) (Flower class)
- HMCS Regina (K234) (Flower class)
- HMCS Rimouski (K121) (Flower class)
- HMCS Rivière du Loup (K357) (Flower class)
- HMCS Rosthern (K169) (Flower class)
- HMCS St. Lambert (K343) (Flower class)
- HMCS Sackville (K181) (Flower class)
- HMCS Saskatoon (K158) (Flower class)
- HMCS Shawinigan (K136) (Flower class)
- HMCS Shediac (K110) (Flower class)
- HMCS Sherbrooke (K152) (Flower class)
- HMCS Smiths Falls (K345) (Flower class)
- HMCS Snowberry (K166) (Flower class)
- HMCS Sorel (K153) (Flower class)
- HMCS Spikenard (K198) (Flower class)
- HMCS Stellarton (K457) (Flower class)
- HMCS Strathroy (K455) (Flower class)
- HMCS Sudbury (K162) (Flower class)
- HMCS Summerside (K141) (Flower class)
- HMCS The Pas (K168) (Flower class)
- HMCS Thorlock (K394) (Flower class)
- HMCS Timmins (K223) (Flower class)
- HMCS Trail (K174) (Flower class)
- HMCS Trentonian (K368) (Flower class)
- HMCS Trillium (K172) (Flower class)
- HMCS Vancouver (K240) (Flower class)
- HMCS Ville de Québec (K242) (Flower class)
- HMCS Wetaskiwin (K175) (Flower class)
- HMCS Weyburn (K173) (Flower class)
- HMCS West York (K369) (Flower class)
- HMCS Whitby (K346) (Flower class)
- HMCS Windflower (K155) (Flower class)
- HMCS Woodstock (K238) (Flower class)
- HMCS Arnprior (K494) (Castle class)
- HMCS Bowmanville (K493) (Castle class)
- HMCS Copper Cliff (K495) (Castle class)
- HMCS Hespeler (K489) (Castle class)
- HMCS Humberstone (K497) (Castle class)
- HMCS Huntsville (K499) (Castle class)
- HMCS Kincardine (K490) (Castle class)
- HMCS Leaside (K492) (Castle class)
- HMCS Orangeville (K491) (Castle class)
- HMCS Petrolia (K498) (Castle class)
- HMCS St. Thomas (K488) (Castle class)
- HMCS Tillsonburg (K496) (Castle class)

=== Submarines ===
- HMCS U 190 (surrendered and recommissioned U-boat)
- HMCS U 889 (surrendered and recommissioned U-boat)

=== Minesweepers ===
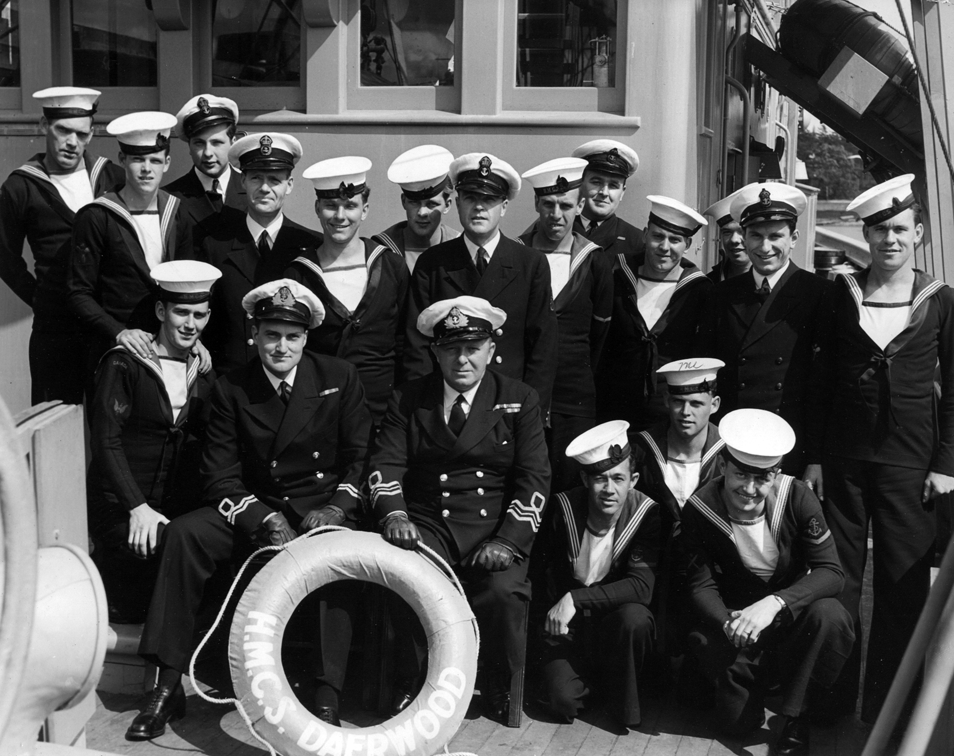
Crew of HMCS Daerwood. 1944

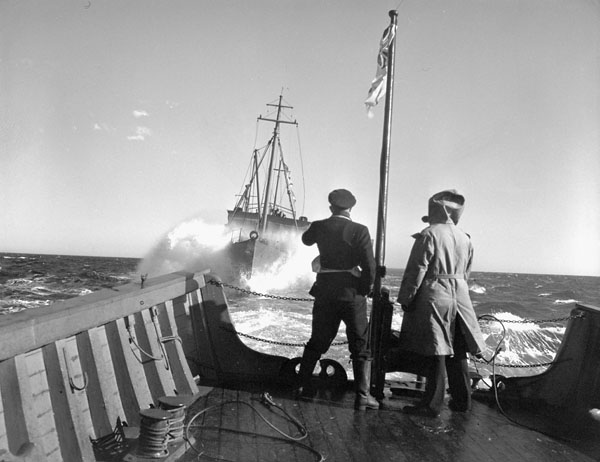
View of HMCS Lloyd George from HMCS Llewellyn off Halifax 1943.'

- HMCS Border Cities (J344) (Algerine class)
- HMCS Fort Frances (J396) (Algerine class)
- HMCS Kapuskasing (J326) (Algerine class)
- HMCS Middlesex (J328) (Algerine class)
- HMCS New Liskeard (J397) (Algerine class)
- HMCS Oshawa (J330) (Algerine class)
- HMCS Portage (J331) (Algerine class)
- HMCS Rockcliffe (J335) (Algerine class)
- HMCS Sault Ste. Marie (J334) (Algerine class)
- HMCS St. Boniface (J332) (Algerine class)
- HMCS Wallaceburg (J336) (Algerine class)
- HMCS Winnipeg (J337) (Algerine class)
- HMCS Bayfield (J08) (Bangor class)
- HMCS Bellechasse (J170) (Bangor class)
- HMCS Blairmore (J314) (Bangor class)
- HMCS Brockville (J270) (Bangor class)
- HMCS Burlington (J250) (Bangor class)
- HMCS Canso (J21) (Bangor class)
- HMCS Caraquet (J38) (Bangor class)
- HMCS Chedabucto (J168) (Bangor class)
- HMCS Chignecto (J160) (Bangor class)
- HMCS Clayoquot (J174) (Bangor class)
- HMCS Courtenay (J262) (Bangor class)
- HMCS Cowichan (J146) (Bangor class)
- HMCS Digby (J267) (Bangor class)
- HMCS Drummondville (J253) (Bangor class)
- HMCS Esquimalt (J272) (Bangor class)
- HMCS Fort William (J311) (Bangor class)
- HMCS Gananoque (J259) (Bangor class)
- HMCS Georgian (J144) (Bangor class)
- HMCS Goderich (J260) (Bangor class)
- HMCS Granby (J264) (Bangor class)
- HMCS Grandmère (J258) (Bangor class)
- HMCS Guysborough (J52) (Bangor class)
- HMCS Ingonish (J69) (Bangor class)
- HMCS Kelowna (J261) (Bangor class)
- HMCS Kenora (J281) (Bangor class)
- HMCS Kentville (J312) (Bangor class)
- HMCS Lachine (J266) (Bangor class)
- HMCS Lockeport (J100) (Bangor class)
- HMCS Mahone (J159) (Bangor class)
- HMCS Malpeque (J148) (Bangor class)
- HMCS Medicine Hat (J256) (Bangor class)
- HMCS Melville (J263) (Bangor class)
- HMCS Milltown (J317) (Bangor class)
- HMCS Minas (J165) (Bangor class)
- HMCS Miramichi (J169) (Bangor class)
- HMCS Mulgrave (J313) (Bangor class)
- HMCS Nipigon (J154) (Bangor class)
- HMCS Noranda (J265) (Bangor class)
- HMCS Outarde (J161) (Bangor class)
- HMCS Port Hope (J280) (Bangor class)
- HMCS Quatsino (J152) (Bangor class)
- HMCS Quinte (J166) (Bangor class)
- HMCS Red Deer (J255) (Bangor class)
- HMCS Sarnia (J309) (Bangor class)
- HMCS Stratford (J310) (Bangor class)
- HMCS Swift Current (J254) (Bangor class)
- HMCS Thunder (J156) (Bangor class)
- HMCS Transcona (J271) (Bangor class)
- HMCS Trois-Rivières (J269) (Bangor class)
- HMCS Truro (J268) (Bangor class)
- HMCS Ungava (J149) (Bangor class)
- HMCS Vegreville (J257) (Bangor class)
- HMCS Wasaga (J162) (Bangor class)
- HMCS Westmount (J318) (Bangor class)
- HMCS Comox (J64) (Fundy class)
- HMCS Fundy (J88) (Fundy class)
- HMCS Gaspé (J94) (Fundy class)
- HMCS Nanoose (J35) (Fundy class)
- HMCS Alder Lake (J480) (Lake class)
- HMCS Ash Lake (J481) (Lake class)
- HMCS Beech Lake (J482) (Lake class)
- HMCS Birch Lake (J483) (Lake class)
- HMCS Cedar Lake (J484) (Lake class)
- HMCS Cherry Lake (J485) (Lake class)
- HMCS Fir Lake (J486) (Lake class)
- HMCS Hickory Lake (J487) (Lake class)
- HMCS Larch Lake (J488) (Lake class)
- HMCS Maple Lake (J489) (Lake class)
- HMCS Oak Lake (J490) (Lake class)
- HMCS Pine Lake (J491) (Lake class)
- HMCS Poplar Lake (J492) (Lake class)
- HMCS Spruce Lake (J493) (Lake class)
- HMCS Willow Lake (J495) (Lake class)
- HMCS Coquitlam (J364) (Llewellyn class)
- HMCS Cranbrook (J372) (Llewellyn class)
- HMCS Daerwood (J357) (Llewellyn class)
- HMCS Kalamalka (J395) (Llewellyn class)
- HMCS Lavallee (J371) (Llewellyn class)
- HMCS Llewellyn (J278) (Llewellyn class)
- HMCS Lloyd George (J279) (Llewellyn class)
- HMCS Revelstoke (J373) (Llewellyn class)
- HMCS Rossland (J358) (Llewellyn class)
- HMCS St. Joseph (J359) (Llewellyn class)

=== Motor launches ===
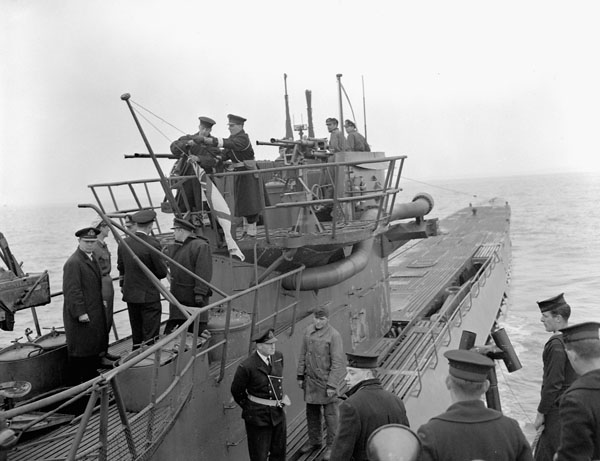
German submarine U-889 surrendering to motor launch Q117 off Nova Scotia, 1945.

- HMC ML Q050 (Fairmile B Type A)
- HMC ML Q051
- HMC ML Q052 (loaned to FFN)
- HMC ML Q053
- HMC ML Q054
- HMC ML Q055
- HMC ML Q056
- HMC ML Q057
- HMC ML Q058
- HMC ML Q059
- HMC ML Q060
- HMC ML Q061
- HMC ML Q062 (loaned to FFN)
- HMC ML Q063 (loaned to FFN)
- HMC ML Q064
- HMC ML Q065
- HMC ML Q066
- HMC ML Q067
- HMC ML Q068
- HMC ML Q069
- HMC ML Q070
- HMC ML Q071
- HMC ML Q072
- HMC ML Q073
- HMC ML Q074
- HMC ML Q075
- HMC ML Q076
- HMC ML Q077
- HMC ML Q078
- HMC ML Q079
- HMC ML Q080
- HMC ML Q081
- HMC ML Q082
- HMC ML Q083
- HMC ML Q084
- HMC ML Q085
- HMC ML Q086
- HMC ML Q087
- HMC ML Q088
- HMC ML Q089
- HMC ML Q090
- HMC ML Q091
- HMC ML Q092
- HMC ML Q093
- HMC ML Q094
- HMC ML Q095
- HMC ML Q096
- HMC ML Q097
- HMC ML Q098
- HMC ML Q099
- HMC ML Q100
- HMC ML Q101
- HMC ML Q102
- HMC ML Q103
- HMC ML Q104
- HMC ML Q105
- HMC ML Q106
- HMC ML Q107
- HMC ML Q108
- HMC ML Q109
- HMC ML Q110
- HMC ML Q111
- HMC ML Q112 (Fairmile B Type B)
- HMC ML Q113
- HMC ML Q114
- HMC ML Q115
- HMC ML Q116
- HMC ML Q117
- HMC ML Q118
- HMC ML Q119
- HMC ML Q120
- HMC ML Q121
- HMC ML Q122
- HMC ML Q124
- HMC ML Q125
- HMC ML Q126
- HMC ML Q127
- HMC ML Q128
- HMC ML Q129

*(Canadian Fairmiles were not commissioned. They were not named, until sold off, or assigned as tenders to various bases post-war. Ships loaned to Free French Navy (FFN) served under Canadian command.)

=== Motor torpedo boats ===
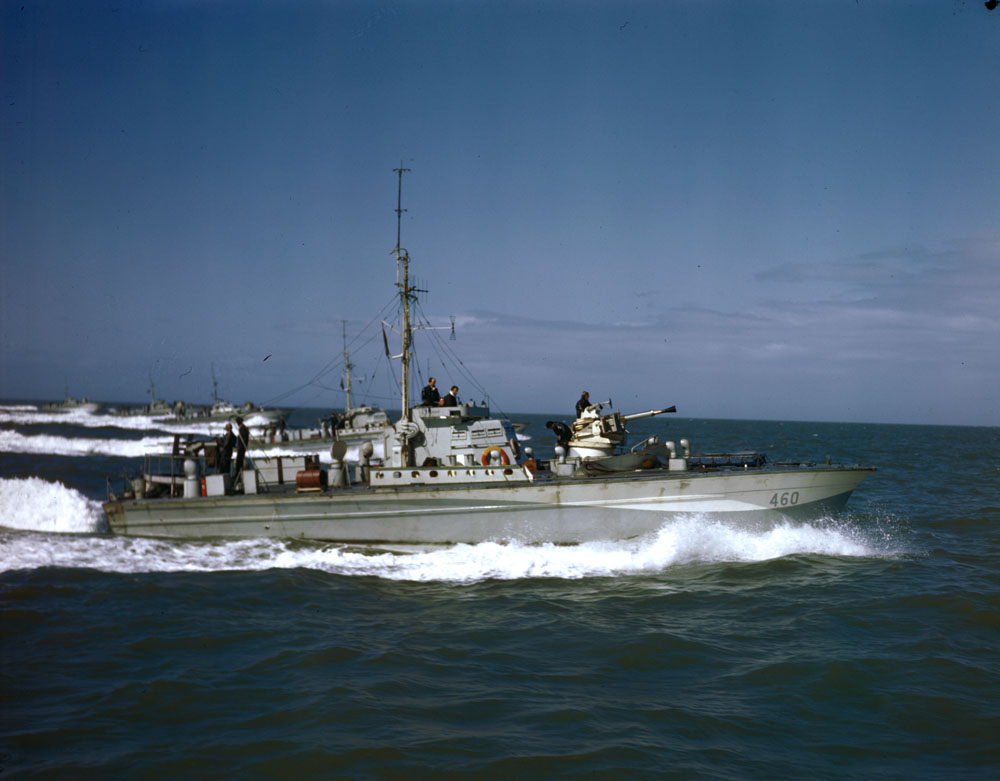
MTB 460 somewhere off England 1944.

- HMCS CMTB-1
- "S-03" (ex USN PT-3)
- "S-04" (ex USN PT-4)
- "S-05" (ex USN PT-5)
- "S-06" (ex USN PT-6)
- "S-07" (ex USN PT-7)
- HMCS S-09 (ex USN PT-9)
- MTB 459 (G type)
- MTB 460 (G type)
- MTB 461 (G type)
- MTB 462 (G type)
- MTB 463 (G type)
- MTB 464 (G type)
- MTB 465 (G type)
- MTB 466 (G type)
- MTB 485 (G type)
- MTB 486 (G type)
- MTB 491 (G type)
- MTB 726 (Fairmile D type)
- MTB 727 (Fairmile D type)
- MTB 735 (Fairmile D type)
- MTB 736 (Fairmile D type)
- MTB 743 (Fairmile D type)
- MTB 744 (Fairmile D type)
- MTB 745 (Fairmile D type)
- MTB 746 (Fairmile D type)
- MTB 747 (Fairmile D type)
- MTB 748 (Fairmile D type)
- MTB 797 (Fairmile D type)

=== Armed trawlers and yachts ===
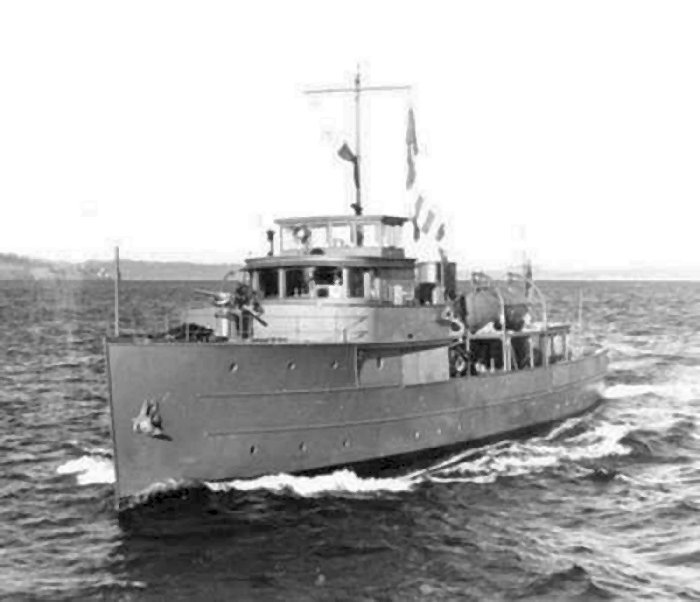
Armed yacht HMCS Cougar c1943.

==== Armed trawlers ====
- HMCS Anticosti (T274) (Isles class)
- HMCS Baffin (T275) (Isles class)
- HMCS Cailiff (T276) (Isles class)
- HMCS Ironbound (T284) (Isles class)
- HMCS Liscomb (T285) (Isles class)
- HMCS Magdalen (T279) (Isles class)
- HMCS Manitoulin (T280) (Isles class)
- HMCS Miscou (T277) (Isles class)

==== Armed yachts ====
- HMCS Ambler (Q11/Z32)
- HMCS Beaver (S10/Z10) (ex-Aztec)
- HMCS Caribou (S12) (ex-Elfreda)
- HMCS Cougar (Z15) (ex-USS Sabalo)
- HMCS Elk (S05) (ex-Arcadia)
- HMCS Grizzly (Z14)
- HMCS Husky (S06)
- HMCS Lynx (Z07)
- HMCS Moose (Z14)
- HMCS Otter
- HMCS Raccoon (S14), (ex-Halonia)
- HMCS Reindeer (S08) (ex-Mascotte)
- HMCS Renard (S13) (ex-Winchester (II))
- HMCS Sans Peur (Z02)
- HMCS Vison (S11)
- HMCS Wolf (Z16)

=== Landing craft ===
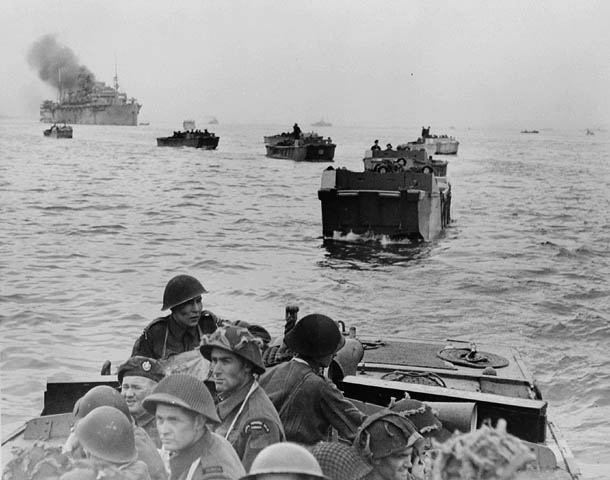
Canadian landing craft approaching Courseulles-sur-Mer, France, D-Day, 1944.

- LCI (L) 115
- LCI (L) 117
- LCI (L) 118
- LCI (L) 121
- LCI (L) 125
- LCI (L) 135
- LCI (L) 166
- LCI (L) 177
- LCI (L) 249
- LCI (L) 250
- LCI (L) 252
- LCI (L) 255
- LCI (L) 260
- LCI (L) 262
- LCI (L) 263
- LCI (L) 264
- LCI (L) 266
- LCI (L) 270
- LCI (L) 271
- LCI (L) 276
- LCI (L) 277
- LCI (L) 285
- LCI (L) 288
- LCI (L) 295
- LCI (L) 298
- LCI (L) 299
- LCI (L) 301
- LCI (L) 302
- LCI (L) 305
- LCI (L) 306
- LCI (L) 310
- LCI (L) 311
- LCA 736
- LCA 850
- LCA 856
- LCA 925
- LCA 1021
- LCA 1033
- LCA 1057
- LCA 1059
- LCA 1137
- LCA 1138
- LCA 1150
- LCA 1151
- LCA 1371
- LCA 1372
- LCA 1374
- LCA 1375

=== Auxiliaries ===
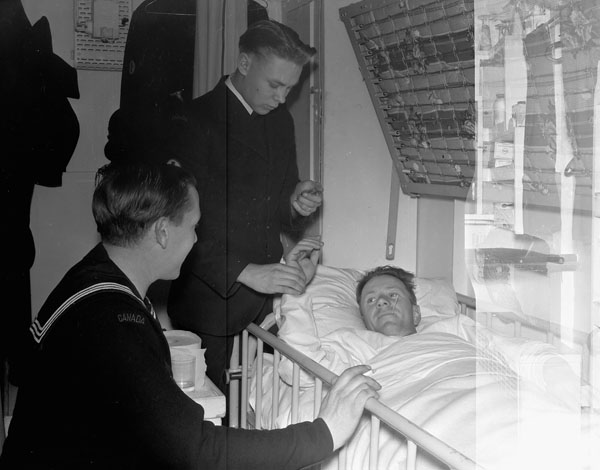
Sickbay of support ship HMCS Provider

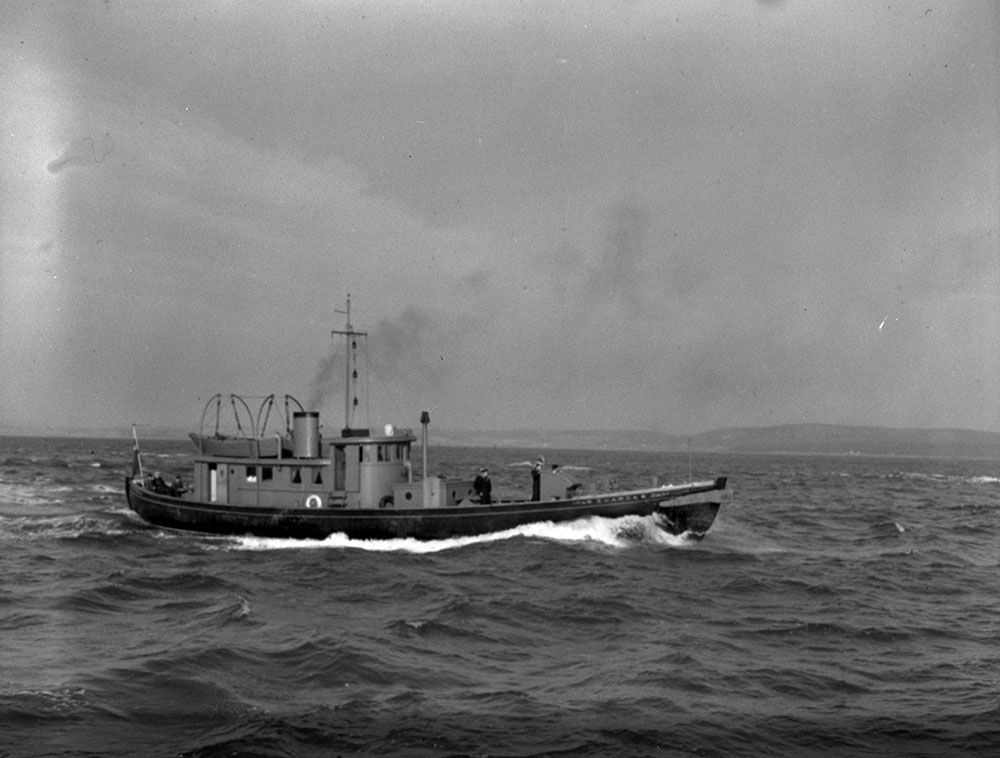
Examination vessel Zoarces

==== Accommodation vessels ====
- HMCS Avalon II

==== Anti-submarine target towing vessels ====
- CNAV Atwood (Z 47)
- CNAV Brentwood (Z 48)
- CNAV Eastwood (Z 49)
- CNAV Greenwood (Z 50)
- CNAV Inglewood (Z 51)
- CNAV Kirkwood (Z 53)
- CNAV Lakewood (Z 63)
- CNAV Oakwood (Z 64)
- CNAV Wildwood (Z 65)

==== Auxiliary minesweepers ====
- HMCS Bras d'Or (TR 18/J06)
- HMCS Cape Beale (Fy 26)
- HMCS Joan W. II (Fy 34)
- HMCS Mitchell Bay (Fy 05)
- HMCS Rayon d'Or (J13/J11/Z11)
- HMCS Reo II (Z33/J08)
- HMCS Signal (Fy 30)
- HMCS Star XVI (Z16/J00)
- HMCS Suderoy I
- HMCS Suderoy II
- HMCS Suderoy IV (J03)
- HMCS Suderoy V (Z04)
- HMCS Suderoy VI (J05)
- HMCS Takla (Fy 27)
- HMCS Venosta (J11/Z21)
- HMCS Vercheres

==== Cable layers ====
- HMCS Cyrus Field

==== Diving vessels ====
- Diving Tender No 2
- Diving Tender No 3
- Diving Tender No 4
- Diving Tender No 5
- Diving Tender No 6

==== Examination vessels ====
- HMCS Andrée Dupré (Z03/W03)
- HMCS Citadelle
- HMCS French (S01/Z23)
- HMCS Fleur de Lis (Z31/J16)
- HMCS Laurier (S09/Z34)
- HMCS Macsin (W07/Z38)
- HMCS Marvita (Z44)
- HMCS Mont Joli (Fy 93/Z02/Z24)
- HMCS Murray Stewart (Z19/J19)
- HMCS Shulamite (Z39)
- HMCS Ulna
- HMCS Zoarces (Fy 62/Z36)

==== Gate vessels ====
- GV 1 (ex-HMCS Ypres)
- GV 2
- GV 3
- GV 4
- GV 5
- GV 6
- GV 7
- GV 8
- GV 9
- GV 10
- GV 11
- GV 12 (ex-HMCS St. Eloi)
- GV 13
- GV 14 (ex-HMCS Loos)
- GV 15 (ex-HMCS Arras)
- GV 16 (ex-HMCS Arleux)
- GV 17 (ex-HMCS Festubert)
- GV 18
- GV 19
- GV 20 (ex- CD 101)
- GV 21
- GV 22
- GV 23
- GV 24

==== Mine laying vessels ====
- HMCS Sankaty
- HMCS Whitethroat (M03/M53)

==== Mobile deperming crafts ====
- HMCS Gryme (Z60)
- HMCS Ross Norman (Z09/J01/J09)

==== Patrol boats ====
- HMCS Adversus (J17)
- HMCS Alachasse (Z18/J18)
- HMCS Allaverdy (Fy 06)
- HMCS Andamara (Z 22)
- HMCS Anna Mildred (Fy 87/Z12A)
- Bantie (W 04)
- HMCS Barkely Sound (Fy23)
- HMCS Barmar (Fy 10/Z115)
- Bartlett
- HMCS B.C. Lady (Fy 07, later to RCAF)
- HMCS Billow (Fy 25), ex-(Fy 32)
- HMCS Camenita (Fy 41)
- HMCS Cancolim (Z10)
- HMCS Canfisco (Fy 17)
- HMCS Capella (Fy 31)
- HMCS Chamiss Bay (Fy 39/F50)
- HMCS Cleopatra (Fy 89/Z35)
- HMCS Combat (later to RCAF)
- HMCS Comber (Fy 37) (ex-C.S.C. II)
- HMCS Crest (Fy 38) (ex-May S)
- HMCS Dalehurst (Fy 35) (ex-Glendale V)
- HMCS Departure Bay (Fy 48)
- HMCS Earl Field (Fy 40)
- HMCS Ehkoli (Fy 12)
- HMCS Eileen
- HMCS Fifer (Fy 00/Z30)
- HMCS Interceptor (Z15)
- HMCS Howe Sound I (Fy 19)
- HMCS Johanna (Fy 28)
- HMCS Kuitan (Fy 14)
- HMCS Leola Vivien (Fy 15, also called Leelo)
- HMCS Lil II
- HMCS Louis Herbert (Fy 92/J22)
- HMCS Loyal I (Fy 43)
- HMCS Loyal II (Fy 22/Z25) (ex-Foam)
- HMCS Maraudor (Fy 03)
- HMCS Margaret I (Fy 29)
- HMCS Meander (Z04)
- HMCS Merry Chase (Fy 46)
- HMCS Moolock (Fy 16)
- HMCS Moresby III (Fy 42)
- HMCS Nenamook (Fy 13)
- HMCS San Tomas (Fy 02)
- HMCS Santa Maria (Fy 08)
- HMCS Smith Sound (Fy 18)
- HMCS Snow Prince (later to RCAF)
- HMCS Spray (Fy 33/Z09) (ex-Hatta VII)
- HMCS Springtime V (Fy 09)
- HMCS Starling (II)
- HMCS Surf (Fy 24) (ex-Arashio)
- HMCS Talapus (Fy 11)
- HMCS Tordo| (Fy 20)
- HMCS Valdes (Fy 21)
- HMCS Vanisle (Fy 01)
- HMCS Vencedor (Z21)
- HMCS West Coast (Fy 04)
- HMCS Western Maid (Fy 36)

==== Support ships ====
- HMCS Dundalk (Z40) (Dun class)
- HMCS Dundurn (Z41) (Dun class)
- HMCS Eastore (Z56)
- HMCS Laymore (Z57)
- HMCS Preserver (F94)
- HMCS Provider (F100)
- HMCS Westore

==== Survey vessels ====
- HMCS Cedarwood (AGSC 539)

==== Tankers ====
- HMCS Mastodon
- HMCS Moonbeam (Z43/J43)
- HMCS Stonechat
- HMCS Sunbeam (Z42)
- HMCS Transriver

==== Tenders ====
- HMCS Chief Seagay
- HMCS Chief Tapeet
- HMCS "Crusader"

==== Training vessels ====
- HMCS Attaboy
- HMCS Cairn
- HMCS Donnaconna II
- HMCS Milicette
- HMCS Oriole
- HMCS Pathfinder
- HMCS Scatari
- HMCS Shirl
- HMCS Skidegate
- HMCS St. Clair
- HMCS Venetia
- HMCS Venture (later HC 190)

==== W/T Calibration vessels ====
- HMCS Aristocrat (Z46)
- HMCS Seretha II (Fy 45/Z45)

==== Other ====
- HMCS Kipawa (BMV)
- HMCS Standard Coaster (Z17/J10) (CS Tow)
- HMCS Anashene
- HMCS Andrew Lee
- HMCS Andy (II)
- HMCS Chaleur (Z20)
- HMCS Cartier (ex-HMCS Charny)
- HMCS Lady Rodney (Fy 46/F40)
- HMCS Macdonald (P07/Z07)
- HMCS Madawaska
- HMCS Magedoma
- HMCS Nitinat (P03/Z03)
- HMCS Norsal (P12/Z12)
- HMCS Venture II
- HMCS Viernoe (J12)

(The symbol FY in the pennant number denotes fishing vessels of the Fisherman's Reserve which comprised a large portion of the auxiliary fleet throughout the Second World War.)

=== Tugboats ===
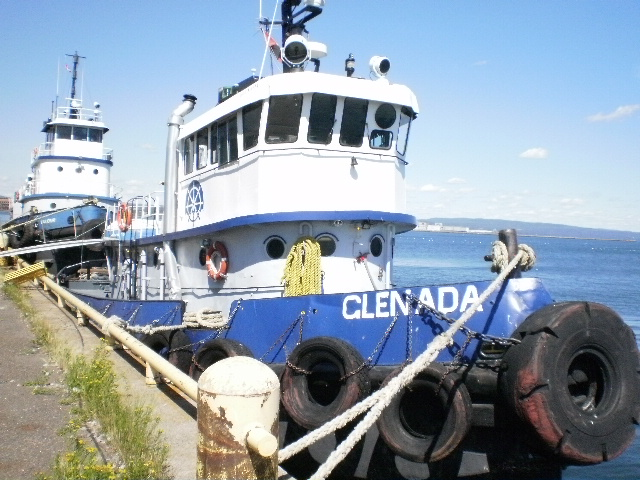
Ex-HMCS Glenada remains a working tug 73 years after launch.

- HMCS Glenada (W30) (Glen class)
- HMCS Glenbrook (W64/YTB 501) (Glen class)
- HMCS Glenclova (Glen class)
- HMCS Glencove (W37) (Glen class)
- HMCS Glendevon (W38/YTB 505) (Glen class)
- HMCS Glendon (W39/YTB 506) (Glen class)
- HMCS Glendower (W24) (Glen class)
- HMCS Glendyne (W68/YTM 503) (Glen class)
- HMCS Gleneagle (W40) (Glen class)
- HMCS Glenella (W41) (Glen class)
- HMCS Glen Evis (W65/YTB 502) (Glen class)
- HMCS Glenfield (W42) (Glen class)
- HMCS Glenholme (W28) (Glen class)
- HMCS Glenkeen (W67) (Glen class)
- HMCS Glen Lea (W25) (Glen class)
- HMCS Glenlivet (W43/YTB 504) (Glen class)
- HMCS Glenmont (W27) (Glen class)
- HMCS Glenora (W26) (Glen class)
- HMCS Glenside (W63/YTB 500) (Glen class)
- HMCS Glenvalley (W44) (Glen class)
- HMCS Glenwood (W45) (Glen class)
- Adamsville (YTS 582) (Ville class)
- Auburnville (W50) (Ville class)
- Barkerville (Ville class)
- Beamsville (YTS 583) (Ville class)
- Blissville (W56) (Ville class)
- Bonnyville (Ville class)
- Coalville (YTS 576) (Ville class)
- Eckville (W58/YTS 580) (Ville class)
- Grenville (W20) (Ville class)
- HMCS Haysville (W18) (Ville class)
- Hartville (Ville class)
- Hodgeville (W53) (Ville class)
- Innisville (Ville class)
- Jamesville (Ville class)
- Johnville (Ville class)
- Kayville (Ville class)
- Kingsville (W19) (Ville class)
- Lakeville (W21) (Ville class)
- Lawrenceville (YTS 584) (Ville class)
- Listerville (YTS 578) (Ville class)
- Loganville (YTS 589) (Ville class)
- Luceville (Ville class)
- Mannville (W57/YTS 577) (Ville class)
- Martinville (W61) (Ville class)
- Marysville (YTS 585) (Ville class)
- Merrickville (Ville class)
- Neville (Ville class)
- Otterville (W32/YTS 590) (Ville class)
- Parksville (W49/YTS 579) (Ville class)
- Pierreville (Ville class)
- HMCS Plainsville (W01/YTS 587) (Ville class)
- Queensville (YTS 586) (Ville class)
- Radville (W52) (Ville class)
- Roseville (Ville class)
- Streetsville (W55) (Ville class)
- Shawville (Ville class)
- Youville (YTS 588) (Ville class)
- HMCS Alberton (W48) (Norton class)
- HMCS Beaverton (W23) (Norton class)
- HMCS Birchton (W35) (Norton class)
- HMCS Clifton (W36/ATA 529) (Norton class)
- HMCS Heatherton (W22/ATA 527) (Norton class)
- HMCS Maxwellton (W46) (Norton class)
- HMCS Norton (W31) (Norton class)
- HMCS Riverton (W47/ATA 528) (Norton class)
- FT 1 (Fire tug)
- FT 2 (Fire tug)
- FT 3 (Fire tug)
- HMCS Bally (Fy 88)
- HMCS Bersimis
- Brighton (W35)
- HMCS D.W. Murray
- HMCS J.A.Cornett
- HMCS Frank Dixon
- HMCS Haro
- HMCS Helena
- HMCS Helen S
- HMCS Lisgar
- HMCS North Lake
- HMCS North Shore
- HMCS North Star
- HMCS Northwind
- HMCS Ocean Eagle (Fy 71/J07)
- HMCS Patricia McQueen
- HMCS Pugwash (W01)
- HMCS Stanpoint

=== Harbour craft ===
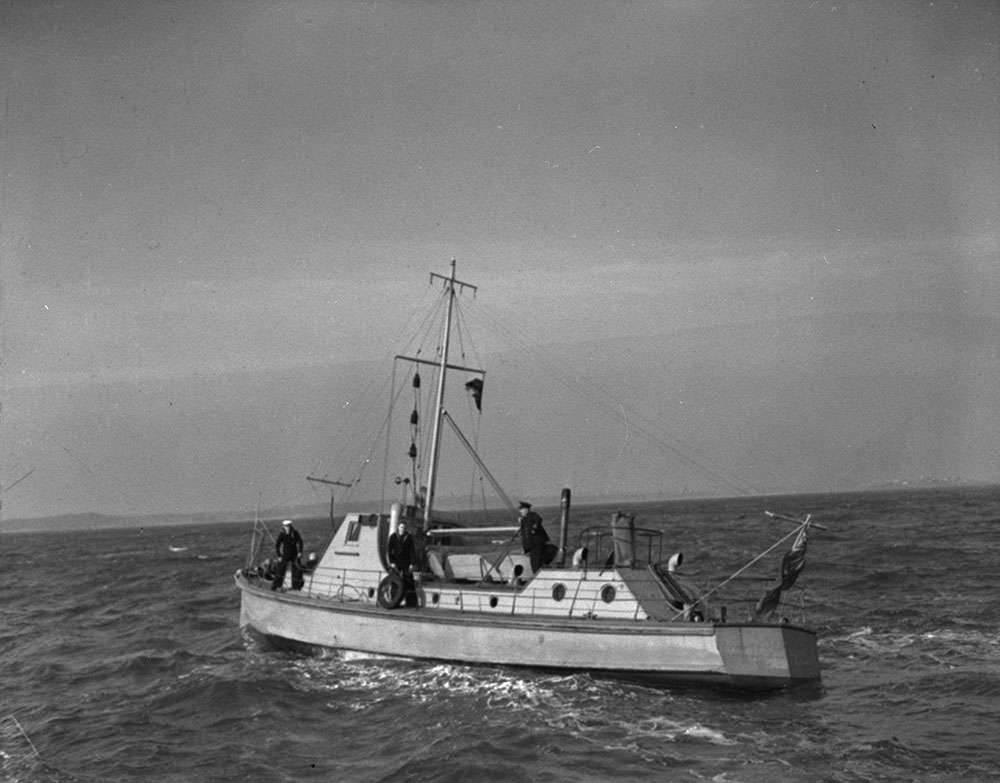
Harbour craft Captor off New Brunswick 1940

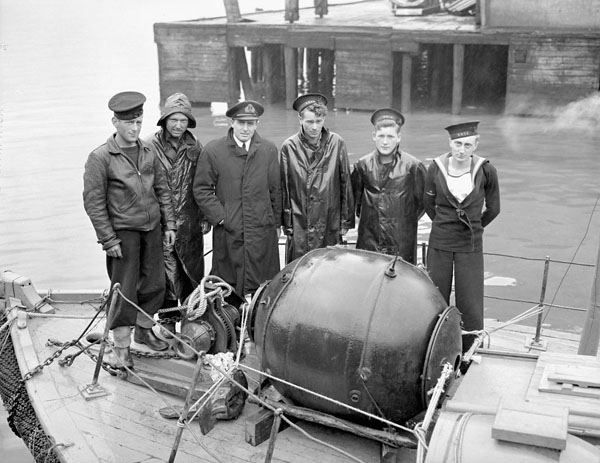
RCN Harbour craft 79 (Miss Kelvin) with recovered mine aboard, St. John's, Newfoundland. 1942

- HC 1 (Gay Rover)
- HC 2
- HC 3
- HC 4
- HC 5
- HC 6
- HC 7
- HC 8
- HC 9
- HC 10
- HC 11
- HC 12
- HC 13
- HC 14
- HC 15
- HC 16
- HC 17
- HC 18
- HC 19
- HC 20
- HC 21
- HC 22
- HC 23
- HC 24
- HC 25
- HC 26 (ex-Active II)
- HC 27 (ex-Advance)
- HC 28 (ex-Aqcharaz)
- HC 29 (ex-Arrow)
- HC 30 (ex-Alberta III)
- HC 31 (ex-Zig Zag, ex-HMCS Avalon III)
- HC 32 (ex-Rustic I)
- HC 33 (ex-HMCS Attendant)
- HC 34 (ex-HMCS Attentive)
- HC 35
- HC 36 (ex-HMCS Burma)
- HC 37 (ex-HMCS Captor I)
- HC 38 (ex-HMCS Castor)
- HC 39 (ex-Clair L)
- HC 40 (I) (ex-Doris May)
- HC 40 (II) (ex-HMCS Invader)
- HC 41 (ex-Edith 1)
- HC 42 (Ednorina)
- HC 43 (ex-Ellsworth)
- HC 44 (ex-Emoh)
- HC 45 (ex-Nancy Lee)
- HC 46 (ex-Fernand Rinfret)
- HC 47 (ex-Guardian)
- HC 48 (ex-Gulf Ranger I)
- HC 49 (ex-HMCS Hochelaga II)
- HC 50 (ex-Invader)
- HC 51 (ex-Islander)
- HC 52 (ex-Jack L. Ingalls)
- HC 53 (ex-HMCS Jalobert)
- HC 54
- HC 55 (ex-Jessie May)
- HC 56 (Langholm)
- HC 57
- HC 58 (ex-Lila G)
- HC 59 (ex-Lorraine)
- HC 60 (ex-Marlis)
- HC 61 (ex-Marmat)
- HC 62 (ex-Matapan)
- HC 63 (ex-HMCS Protector)
- HC 64 (ex-Raficer)
- HC 65 (ex-Saker II)
- HC 66
- HC 67 (ex-Marie Therese)
- HC 68
- HC 69 (ex-Wild Duck I)
- HC 70 (ex-"ML 007")
- HC 71
- HC 72
- HC 73 (ex-"ML 010")
- HC 74
- HC 75 (ex-"ML 013", ex-HMCS Lynx))
- HC 76
- HC 77
- HC 78 (ex-Miss Gray)
- HC 79 (ex-Miss Kelvin)
- HC 80 (ex-Moby Dick I)
- HC 82
- HC 83
- HC 84
- HC 85 (ex-Nancy C)
- HC 86 (ex-Nepsya)
- HC 87 (ex-New America)
- HC 88 (Newbrunswicker)
- HC 89 (ex-Laval)
- HC 90 (ex-Papoose)
- HC 91
- HC 92 (ex-Rio Casma)
- HC 93 (ex-R.J. Foote)
- HC 94 (ex-Rosemary)
- HC 95 (ex-Saltpetre)
- HC 96 (ex-Saravan)
- HC 97 (ex-Shirley Mae)
- HC 98 (ex-Soma I)
- HC 99 (ex-Spartan III)
- HC 100 (ex-Sidney River)
- HC 101 (ex-Tantramar)
- HC 102 (ex-HMCS Tuna II)
- HC 103 (ex-Valinda)
- HC 104 (ex-HMCS Vigil II)
- HC 105 (ex-Wild Duck II)
- HC 106 (ex-Wings)
- HC 107 (ex-Workboy)
- HC 108
- HC 109
- HC 110 (ex-Queen Bee I)
- HC 113
- HC 115
- HC 116
- HC 117
- HC 118
- HC 119
- HC 120
- HC 122
- HC 121 (ex-Lady Beth II)
- HC 123 (ex-Tao Tog)
- HC 124 (ex-Yorkholme)
- HC 125 (Universe Z125)
- HC 126
- HC 127 (ex-Skimmer II)
- HC 128 (ex-Bytown
- HC 129 (ex-Susan S)
- HC 130 (ex-Fahe)
- HC 131
- HC 132
- HC 133 (ex-Montcalm)
- HC 134 (ex-Fortuna)
- HC 135 (Veraine)
- HC 136 (ex-Ditchburn)
- HC 137 (ex-Venning)
- HC 138 (ex-Viking)
- HC 139 (ex-Rainbow II)
- HC 140
- HC 141
- HC 142 (ex-HMCS Blarney II)
- HC 143 (ex-HMCS Gertrude)
- HC 144 (ex-HMCS Hornet)
- HC 145 (ex-HMCS Uno)
- HC 146
- HC 147 (ex-Dorcas II)
- HC 148
- HC 149
- HC 151
- HC 152
- HC 153
- HC 154
- HC 155
- HC 156
- HC 157 (ex-HC 81)
- HC 158 (ex-Dolphin II III)
- HC 159 (ex-Mush)
- HC 160 (ex-Mary Goreham)
- HC 161
- HC 162
- HC 163
- HC 164
- HC 165 (ex-Pal-O-Mine II)
- HC 166
- HC 167
- HC 168
- HC 169
- HC 170 (ex-Mush)
- HC 171 (ex-Skimmer III)
- HC 173
- HC 175
- HC 176
- HC 177
- HC 178
- HC 180 (ex-RCMP D-10)
- HC 181
- HC 182
- HC 183
- HC 184
- HC 185
- HC 186
- HC 187
- HC 188
- HC 189
- HC 190 (ex -HMCS Venture)
- HC 191 (ex-Autumn Leaf)
- HC 192
- HC 193
- HC 194
- HC 195
- HC 196
- HC 197
- HC 198
- HC 199
- HC 200
- HC 201 (ex-Yendys)
- HC 202 (ex-Mudathalapadu)
- HC 203
- HC 204
- HC 205
- HC 206
- HC 207 (ex-Paragon II I)
- HC 208
- HC 209
- HC 210
- HC 211
- HC 212
- HC 213
- HC 214
- HC 215
- HC 217
- HC 218 (ex-Retlas)
- HC 219
- HC 220
- HC 221
- HC 223 (ex-Sea Bird II)
- HC 224
- HC 225
- HC 230
- HC 231
- HC 232
- HC 233
- HC 234
- HC 235
- HC 236
- HC 237
- HC 238
- HC 239
- HC 240
- HC 241
- HC 242
- HC 243
- HC 244
- HC 245
- HC 246
- HC 247
- HC 248
- HC 249
- HC 250
- HC 251
- HC 252
- HC 253
- HC 254
- HC 255
- HC 256
- HC 257
- HC 258
- HC 259
- HC 260
- HC 261
- HC 262
- HC 263
- HC 264
- HC 265
- HC 266
- HC 267
- HC 268
- HC 269
- HC 270
- HC 272
- HC 273
- HC 274
- HC 275
- HC 276
- HC 277
- HC 278
- HC 279
- HC 280
- HC 281
- HC 282
- HC 284
- HC 285
- HC 286
- HC 287
- HC 288
- HC 289
- HC 290
- HC 291
- HC 292
- HC 293
- HC 294
- HC 295
- HC 296
- HC 297
- HC 298 (Weetiebud)
- HC 299
- HC 300 (ex-Lipari)
- HC 301
- HC 303
- HC 304
- HC 305
- HC 306
- HC 307
- HC 309
- HC 310
- HC 311
- HC 312
- HC 313
- HC 314
- HC 315
- HC 316
- HC 319
- HC 320
- HC 322 (Fy 47, Sea Wave)
- HC 323
- HC 325
- HC 326
- HC 327
- HC 328 (Fy 41, ex-Bluenose)
- HC 329
- HC 330
- HC 331
- HC 332
- HC 333
- HC 334
- HC 335
- HC 336
- HC 337
- HC 338
- HC 339 (Fy 45, ex-Sea Flash)
- HC 340 (ex-HMCS Bluenose)
- HC 342
- HC 343
- HC 344
- HC 345 (ex-Go Getter)
- HC 346
- HC 347
- HC 349
- HC 350
- HC 351
- HPC 1
- HPC 2
- HPC 3
- HPC 4
- HPC 5
- HPC 6
- HPC 7
- HPC 8
- HPC 9
- HPC 10
- HPC 11
- HPC 12
- HPC 14
- HPC 15
- HPC 16
- HPC 17
- HPS 18 (Imperator Z18)
- HPC 19
- HPC 20
- HPC 21 (ex-Lucinda II)
- HPC 22 (ex-Kwabeeta)
- HPC 23
- HPC 24
- HPC 25
- HPC 26
- HPC 27
- HPC 28
- HPC 29
- HPC 30
- HPC 31
- HPC 33
- HPC 34
- HPC 35
- HPC 36
- HPC 37
- HPC 38
- HPC 39
- HPC 40
- HPC 41

== Commissioned 1948–89 ==
The national flag served as the naval ensign from 1965 to 2013

As the Second World War drew to a close the RCN stopped its rapid expansion and dramatically reduced its military expenditures. This resulted in a significant reduction in personnel and ships by 1947. A planned transfer of two light aircraft carriers from the Royal Navy, HMCS Warrior and HMCS Magnificent was slowed, and Warrior eventually returned. With the emergence of the Cold War and the formation of the North Atlantic Treaty Organization, followed by the outbreak of the Korean War, the Canadian government increased military spending. The RCN recommissioned and modified Second World War ships held in reserve, launched new classes of ships, and upgraded its aviation capabilities. In 1968, the RCN was amalgamated with the Royal Canadian Air Force and Canadian Army to form the unified Canadian Forces. All personnel, ships, and aircraft became part of Maritime Command (MARCOM), as an element of the Canadian Armed Forces.

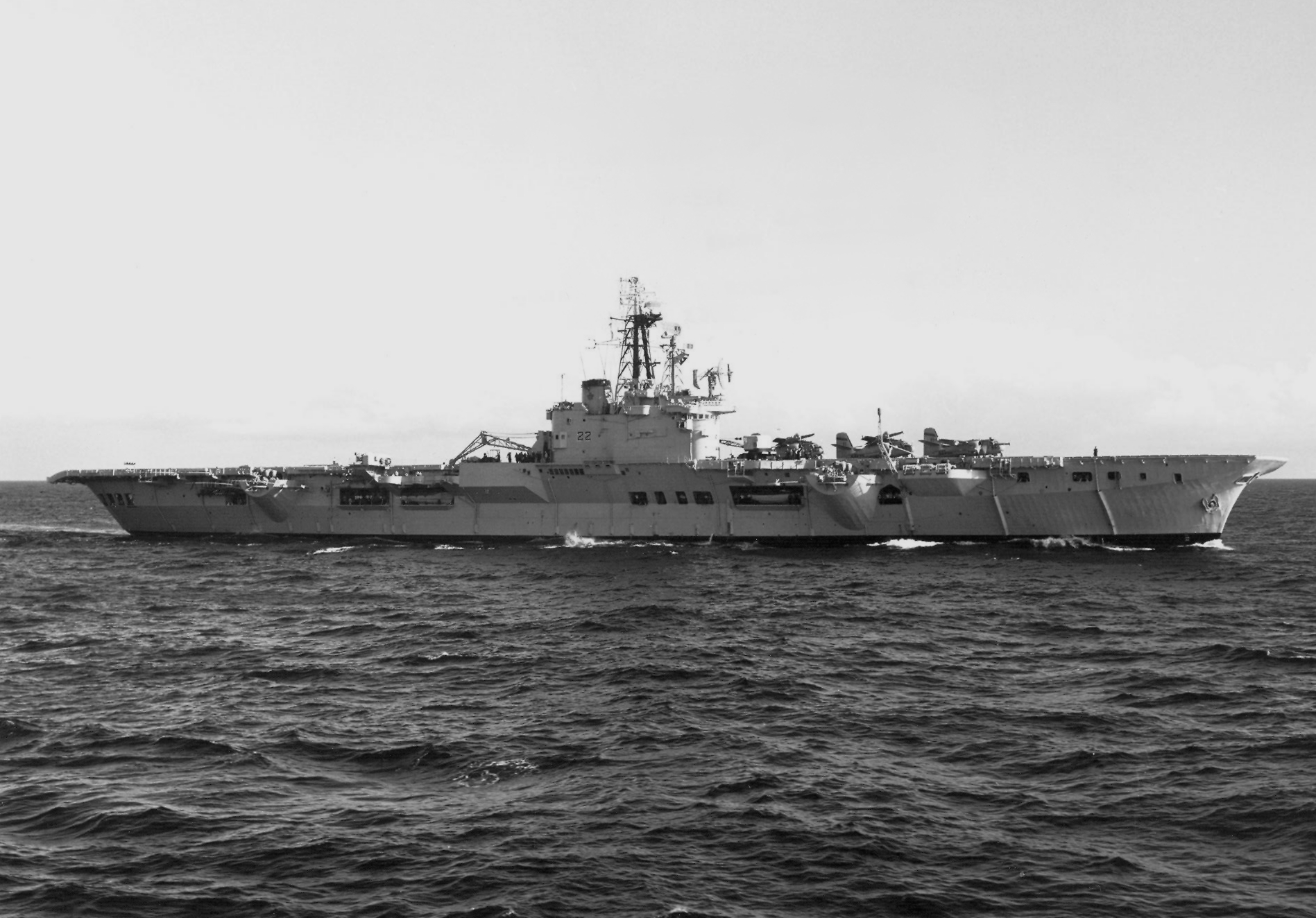
HMCS Bonaventure underway in 1961

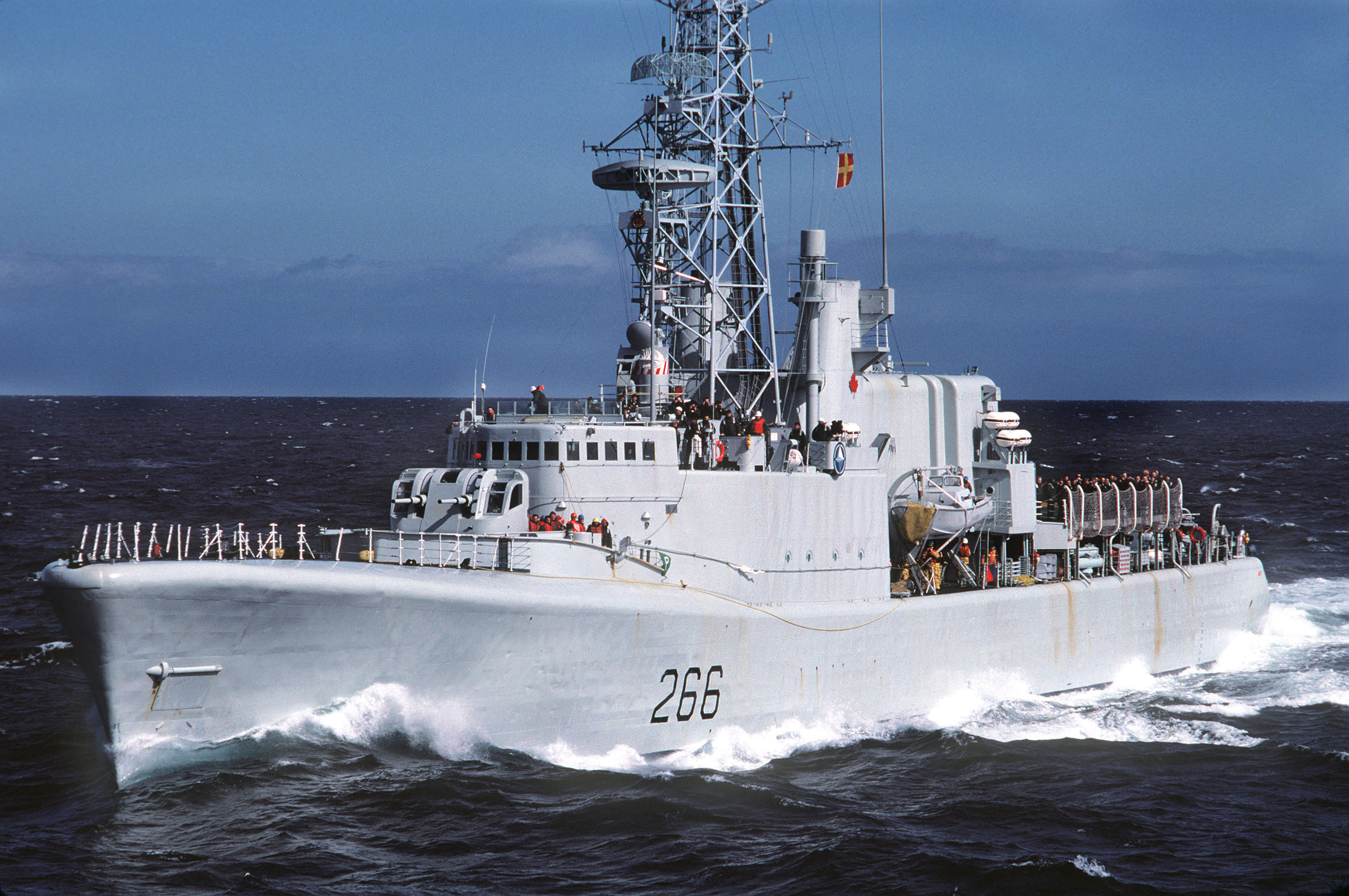
Destroyer escort HMCS Nipigon on NATO exercises in 1985

=== Aircraft carriers ===
- HMCS Bonaventure (CVL 22) (Majestic class)
- HMCS Magnificent (CVL 21) (Majestic class)

=== Destroyers ===
- HMCS Iroquois (DDG 280) (Iroquois class)
- HMCS Huron (DDG 281)
- HMCS Athabaskan (DDG 282)
- HMCS Algonquin (DDG 283)

=== Destroyer escorts ===
- HMCS Annapolis (DDH 265) (II) (Annapolis class)
- HMCS Nipigon (DDH 266) (II)
- HMCS Mackenzie (DDE 261) (Mackenzie class)
- HMCS Saskatchewan (DDE 262) (II)
- HMCS Yukon (DDE 263)
- HMCS Qu'Appelle (DDE 264) (II)
- HMCS Chaudière (DDE 235) (II) (Restigouche class)
- HMCS Columbia (DDE 260) (II)
- HMCS Gatineau (DDE 236) (II)
- HMCS Kootenay (DDE 258) (II)
- HMCS Restigouche (DDE 257) (II)
- HMCS St. Croix (DDE 256) (II)
- HMCS Terra Nova (DDE 259)
- HMCS Assiniboine (DDH 234) (II) (St. Laurent class)
- HMCS Fraser (DDH 233) (II)
- HMCS Margaree (DDH 230) (II)
- HMCS Ottawa (DDH 229) (III)
- HMCS St. Laurent (DDH 205) (II)
- HMCS Skeena (DDH 207) (II)
- HMCS Saguenay (DDH 206) (II)

=== Submarines ===
- HMCS Grilse (SS 71) (II) (Balao class)
- HMCS Ojibwa (S72) (Oberon class)
- HMCS Okanagan (S74) (Oberon class)
- HMCS Onondaga (S73) (Oberon class)
- HMCS Rainbow (SS 75) (II) (Tench class)

=== Minesweepers ===
- HMCS Chaleur (MCB 144) (I) (Bay class)
- HMCS Chaleur (MCB 164) (II)
- HMCS Chignecto (MCB 156) (II)
- HMCS Chignecto (MCB 160) (III)
- HMCS Comox (MCB 146) (II)
- HMCS Cowichan (MCB 147) (II)
- HMCS Cowichan (MCB 162) (III)
- HMCS Fortune (MCB 151)
- HMCS Fundy (MCB 145) (II)
- HMCS Fundy (MCB 159) (III)
- HMCS Gaspé (MCB 143) (II)
- HMCS James Bay (MCB 152)
- HMCS Miramichi (MCB 150) (II)
- HMCS Miramichi (MCB 163) (III)
- HMCS Quinte (MCB 149) (II)
- HMCS Resolute (MCB 154)
- HMCS Thunder (MCB 153) (II)
- HMCS Thunder (MCB 161) (III)
- HMCS Trinity (MCB 157)
- HMCS Ungava (MCB 148) (II)

=== Patrol vessels ===
- HMCS Acadian (Detachment class)
- HMCS Adversus (PB 191) (II)
- HMCS Captor (II)
- HMCS Arctic Tern (PCS 784) (Bird class)
- HMCS Blue Heron (PCS 782) (Bird)
- HMCS Cormorant (PCS 781) (I) (Bird)
- HMCS Herring Gull (PCS 786) (Bird)
- HMCS Kingfisher (PCS 787) (Bird)
- HMCS Loon (PCS 780) (Bird)
- HMCS Mallard (PCS 783) (Bird)
- HMCS Sandpiper (PCS 785) (Bird)
- HMCS Rally (PB 141) (Racer class)
- HMCS Rapid (PB 142) (Racer)
- HMCS Sidney
- HMCS Black Duck (YFL 872) (ex-Black Duck (RCAF))

=== Auxiliary ===
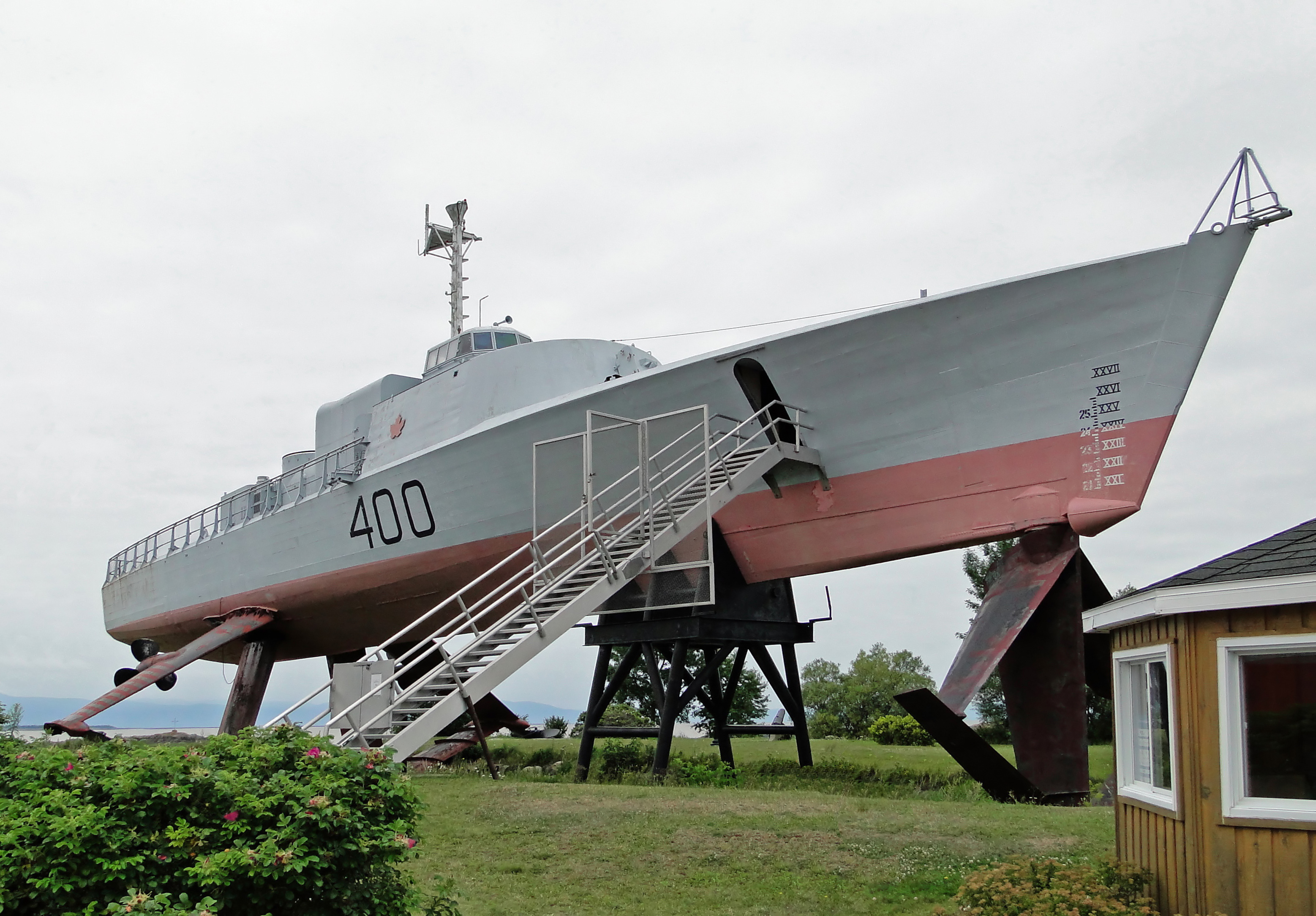
HMCS Bras d'Or at the Musée maritime du Québec, L'Islet-sur-Mer

==== Auxiliary minesweeping ====
- HMCS Anticosti (MSA 110) (II) (Anticosti class)
- HMCS Moresby (MSA 112) (III)
- HMCS Cordova (MCA 158) (YMS-1 class)

==== Diving support ship ====
- HMCS Cormorant (ASL 20) (II)

==== Escort maintenance ships ====
- HMCS Cape Breton (ARE 100) (Cape class)
- HMCS Cape Scott (ARE 101)

==== Fireboats ====
- CFAV Firebird (YTR 561)
- CFAV Firebrand (YTR 562)

==== Gate vessels ====
- HMCS Porte Dauphine (YMG 186) (Porte class)
- HMCS Porte de la Reine (YMG 184)
- HMCS Porte Quebec (YMG 185)
- HMCS Porte St. Jean (YMG 180)
- HMCS Porte St. Louis (YMG 183)

==== High speed launch vessels ====
- HSL-208 (ex-RCMP M208)
- HSL-231 (ex-RCMP M231)
- HSL-232 (ex-RCMP M232)
- HSL-233 (ex-RCMP M233)
- HSL-234 (ex-RCMP M234)
- HSL-235 (ex-RCMP M235)

==== Hydrofoil prototype ====
- HMCS Baddeck (R-103), ex-HMCS Bras d'Or (R-103) (I)
- HMCS Bras d'Or (FHE 400) (II)

==== Icebreaker ====
- HMCS Labrador (AW 50) (Wind class)

==== Survey ships ====
- CFAV Bluethroat (AGOR 114)
- HMCS Endeavour (AGOR 171) (Endeavour class)
- CFAV Quest (AGOR 172)
- HMCS Vancouver (IV)

===== Replenishment oilers =====
- HMCS Protecteur (AOR 509) (Protecteur class)
- HMCS Preserver (AOR 510)
- HMCS Provider (AOR 508) (Provider class)

===== Tugboats =====
- CFAV Glendyne (YTB 640) (Glen class)
- CFAV Glendale (YTB 641)
- CFAV Glenevis (YTB 642)
- CFAV Glenbrook (YTB 643)
- CFAV Glenside (YTB 644)
- CFAV Lawrenceville (YTL 590) (Ville class)
- CFAV Parksville (YTL 591)
- CFAV Listerville (YTL 592)
- CFAV Merrickville (YTL 593)
- CFAV Marysville (YTL 594)
- CFAV Saint Anthony (ATA 531) (Saint class)
- CFAV Saint Charles (ATA 533)
- CFAV Saint John (ATA)
- CFAV Tillicum (YTM 555)

===== Training vessels =====
- HMCS Beaver (PTC 706), ex-ML Q106) (II)
- CFAV Fort Steele

==== Utility and other boats ====
- CFAV Grizzly (YAG 306)
- CFAV Cougar (YAG 308)
- CFAV YTP 4 (YTP 4)
- CFAV Otter (YAG 312)
- CFAV Caribou (YAG 314)
- CFAV Blue Boat 316 (YFB 316)
- CFAV Vixen (YFB 317)
- CFAV Blue Boat 318 (YFB 318)
- CFAV Badger (YAG 319)
- CFAV Lynx (YAG 320)
- CFAV Pelican (YAG 4)
- CFAV Blackduck (YAG 660)
- CFAV Albatross (YAG 661)
- CFAV Gemini (YAG 650)
- CFAV Pegasus (YAG 651)

==== Yard diving tenders ====
- CFAV Granby (YDT 12)
- CFAV Raccoon (YDT 10)
- Unnamed (YDT 11)

==== Submarine non-operational ====
- ex-HMS Olympus – training ship
- ex-HMS Osiris – stripped for parts in UK

== Commissioned 1990 to present ==
=== Submarines ===
Victoria class

- HMCS Victoria (2000–active)
- HMCS Windsor (2003–active)
- HMCS Corner Brook (2003–active)
- HMCS Chicoutimi (2015–active)

=== Frigates ===
Halifax class

- HMCS Halifax (1992–-active)
- HMCS Vancouver (1993–active)
- HMCS Ville de Québec (1994–active)
- HMCS Toronto (1993–active)
- HMCS Regina (1993–active)
- HMCS Calgary (1995–active)
- HMCS Montréal (1994–active)
- HMCS Fredericton (1994–active)
- HMCS Winnipeg (1995–active)
- HMCS Charlottetown (1995–active)
- HMCS St. John's (1996–active)
- HMCS Ottawa (1996–active)

=== Offshore patrol ships ===
Harry DeWolf class

- HMCS Harry DeWolf (2021–active)
- HMCS Margaret Brooke (2022–active)
- HMCS Max Bernays (2024–active)
- HMCS William Hall (2024–active)
- HMCS Frédérick Rolette (2025–active)

=== Maritime coastal defence vessels ===
Kingston class

- HMCS Kingston (1996–2025)
- HMCS Glace Bay (1996–2025)
- HMCS Nanaimo (1997–active)
- HMCS Edmonton (1997–active)
- HMCS Shawinigan (1997–2025)
- HMCS Whitehorse (1998–2025)
- HMCS Yellowknife (1998–active)
- HMCS Goose Bay (1998–2025)
- HMCS Moncton (1998–active)
- HMCS Saskatoon (1998–2025)
- HMCS Brandon (1999–2025)
- HMCS Summerside (1999–2025)

=== Patrol and training vessels ===
Orca class

- Orca (PCT 55) (2006–active)
- Raven (PCT 56) (2007–active)
- Caribou (PCT 57) (2007–active)
- Renard (PCT 58) (2007–active)
- Wolf (PCT 59) (2007–active)
- Grizzly (PCT 60) (2008–active)
- Cougar (PCT 61) (2008–active)
- Moose (PCT 62) (2008–active)

=== Support and auxiliary vessels ===
==== Interim auxiliary replenishment vessel ====
- Asterix

==== Sail training ships ====
- HMCS Oriole
- HMSTV Goldcrest (KC 2355)
- HMSTV Tuna (KC 2372)
- HMSTV Osprey (CAN 4510)
- HMSTV Eagle (CAN 4511)

==== Torpedo and sound ranging vessels ====
- CFAV Sikanni (YTP 611)
- CFAV Stikine (YTP 613)

==== Yard diving tenders ====
- Unnamed (YDT 11)
- CFAV Granby (YDT 12)
- CFAV Tonnerre (YDT 21)
- CFAV Sechelt (YDT 610)
- CFAV Sooke (YDT 612)

==== Tugboats ====
- CFAV Glendyne (YTB 640)
- CFAV Glendale (YTB 641)
- CFAV Glenevis (YTB 642)
- CFAV Glenbrook (YTB 643)
- CFAV Glenside (YTB 644)
- CFAV Tillicum (YTM 555)
- CFAV Lawrenceville (YTL 590)
- CFAV Parksville (YTL 591)
- CFAV Listerville (YTL 592)
- CFAV Merrickville (YTL 593)
- CFAV Granville (YTL 594)
- CFAV Haro
- CFAV Barkerville
- CFAV Canso
- CFAV Stella Maris

==== Yard auxiliary general ====
- CFAV Pelican (YAG 4)
- CFAV Gemini (YAG 650)
- CFAV Pegasus (YAG 651)
- CFAV Albatross (YAG 661)
- CFAV Black Duck (YAG 660)
- CFAV Egret

== See also ==
- Origins of the Royal Canadian Navy
- History of the Royal Canadian Navy
- Hull classification symbol (Canada)
- His Majesty's Canadian Ship
- List of aircraft of the Royal Canadian Navy
- Fleet of the Royal Canadian Navy

Naval vessels of Canada prior to 1910, and other British North American colonies

- Royal Newfoundland Constabulary
- Provincial Marine

Naval vessels of other Canadian government departments

- Fisheries Canada
- Coast Guard
- RCMP
- Canadian Hydrographic Service

Naval vessels of other British imperial and commercial entities in North America

- Hudson's Bay Company
- Sea Fencibles
