= HMCS Cormorant =

HMCS Cormorant may refer to two ships that served in the Royal Canadian Navy and the Canadian Forces:

- HMCS Cormorant (PCS 781), a Bird-class patrol vessel launched in 1956 and paid off in 1963.
- HMCS Cormorant (ASL 20), a diving support vessel launched in 1965 as the trawler Aspa Quarto. Acquired by Canada in 1975, the ship served until 1997.
