= Baleine (disambiguation) =

Baleine is the French word for whale.

It may refer to

- Philippe de Baleine, French author

== Places ==
- Baleine, Nova Scotia, community in Nova Scotia
- La Baleine, a commune in Normandy
- La Baleine, Quebec, a locality in Quebec
- Tête-à-la-Baleine, a locality in Quebec

== Rivers in Quebec ==
- Riviere a la Baleine
- Grande-Baleine River
- Petite Rivière de la Baleine

== Ships ==
- HMS Baleine, 18th century British frigate
- HMCS Baleine, 20th century Canadian minesweeper
