= HMCS Thunder =

Several Canadian naval units have been named HMCS Thunder;

- HMCS Thunder (J156), a Bangor-class minesweeper commissioned in 1941 and broken up in 1947.
- HMCS Thunder (MCB 153), a Bay-class minesweeper commissioned in 1953 and sold to France in 1954.
- HMCS Thunder (MCB 161), a Bay-class minesweeper commissioned in 1957 and decommissioned in 1997.

== Battle honours ==
- Atlantic, 1941–44
- English Channel, 1944–45
- Normandy, 1944
