= HMCS Thunder (MCB 153) =

History

Canada
- Name: Thunder
- Namesake: Thunder Bay
- Builder: Canadian Vickers Ltd., Montreal
- Laid down: 17 May 1951
- Launched: 17 July 1952
- Commissioned: 15 December 1953
- Decommissioned: 31 March 1954
- Identification: MCB 153
- Honours and awards: Atlantic 1941–44, Normandy 1944, English Channel 1944–45
- Fate: Sold to France as La Paimpolaise
- Badge: Gules, a pile vert edged or, charged with a representation of the head of Thor, God of thunderstorms, affrontée, wearing a Nordic open crown composed of a circlet with eight arches all plain and meeting together in a point at the pinnacle, his beard formed into nine radiating coils each tapering to a point with a small spearhead at the end

France
- Name: La Paimpolaise
- Acquired: 31 March 1954
- Commissioned: 21 May 1954
- Decommissioned: 31 January 1987
- Stricken: 1987
- Identification: P 657

General characteristics
- Class & type: Bay-class minesweeper
- Displacement: 390 tons (412 tons deep load)
- Length: 152 ft (46 m)
- Beam: 28 ft (8.5 m)
- Draught: 8 ft (2.4 m)
- Propulsion: 2 shafts, 2 GM 12-cylinder diesels, 2,400 bhp (1,800 kW)
- Speed: 16 knots (30 km/h; 18 mph)
- Range: 3,290 nmi (6,090 km; 3,790 mi) at 12 kn (22 km/h; 14 mph)
- Complement: 38
- Armament: 1 × 40 mm Bofors gun

HMCS Thunder (hull number MCB 153) was a Bay-class minesweeper that served in the Royal Canadian Navy for three and a half months in 1954 before being sold to the French Navy to become La Paimpolaise. The ship was named for Thunder Bay and was the second vessel to carry the name. Her name was given to her replacement, HMCS Thunder (MCB 161).

== Design ==
The Bay class were designed and ordered as replacements for the Second World War-era minesweepers that the Royal Canadian Navy operated at the time. Similar to the Ton-class minesweeper, they were constructed of wood planking and aluminum framing.

Displacing 390 long tons (400 t) standard at 412 long tons (419 t) at deep load, the minesweepers were 152 ft (46 m) long with a beam of 28 ft (8.5 m) and a draught of 8 ft (2.4 m). They had a complement of 38 officers and ratings. (Note: Gardiner and Chumbley claim the complement was 40.)

The Bay-class minesweepers were powered by two GM 12-cylinder diesel engines driving two shafts creating 2,400 brake horsepower (1,800 kW). This gave the ships a maximum speed of 16 knots (30 km/h; 18 mph) and a range of 3,290 nautical miles (6,090 km; 3,790 mi) at 12 knots (22 km/h; 14 mph). The ships were armed with one 40 mm Bofors gun and were equipped with minesweeping gear.

== Service history ==
Thunder's keel was laid down on 17 May 1951 by Canadian Vickers at their yard in Montreal, Quebec. The minesweeper was launched on 17 July 1952. The vessel was commissioned into the Royal Canadian Navy on 15 December 1953 with the hull identification number 144.

After commissioning spent three months in service with the Royal Canadian Navy. The minesweeper was paid off on 31 March 1954. She was transferred to France the same day, but the French flag was only raised aboard the ship on 1 April. The minesweeper was commissioned on 21 May 1954 and renamed La Paimpolaise. She served as a minesweeper until 1973 when the minesweeping gear was removed and she transferred to the Pacific for duty as an overseas territories patrol vessel. She was paid off 31 January 1987 and stricken later that year.
