= CD-class naval drifter =

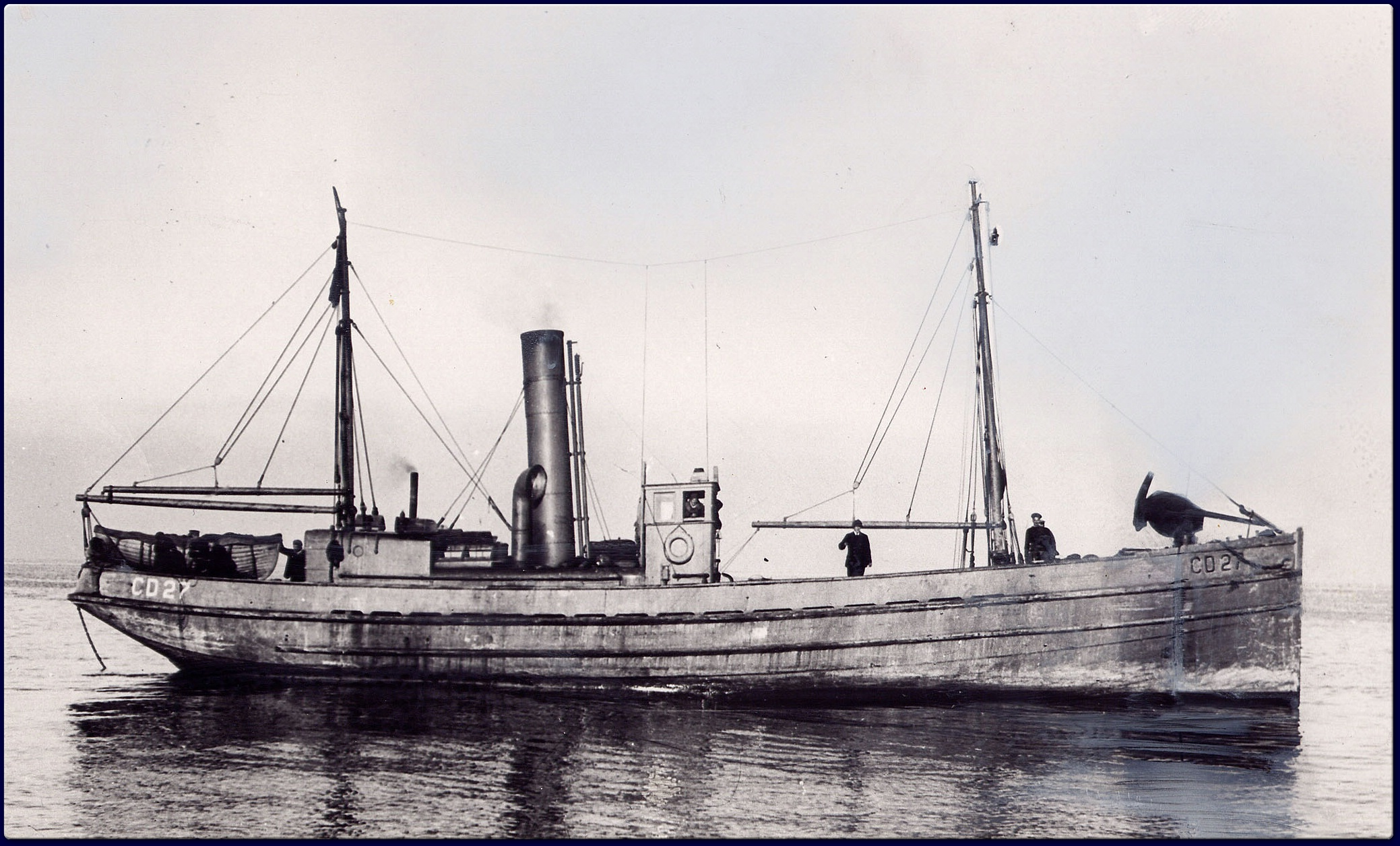
- The Canadian naval drifter CD 27

Class overview
- Name: CD class
- Operators: Royal Navy; Royal Canadian Navy; United States Navy
- Built: 1917
- Planned: 100
- Completed: 100

General characteristics
- Type: Naval drifter
- Displacement: 99 long tons (101 t)
- Length: 84 ft 0 in (25.6 m)
- Beam: 19 ft 3 in (5.9 m)
- Draught: 10 ft 0 in (3.0 m)
- Speed: 9 knots (17 km/h)
- Armament: 1 × QF 6-pounder (57 mm) gun

The CD-class naval drifters were armed naval drifters constructed in 1917 for the Royal Navy in Canada. A hundred were ordered for use in British waters during World War I numbered from CD 1 to CD 100, of which 42 were transferred to the Royal Canadian Navy and 18 were transferred to the United States Navy. In British waters, they were used to patrol areas around Gibraltar and Bermuda. In Canadian waters, the Maritimes and in American waters, along the New England coast. Following the war, the drifters were either sold into mercantile service or scrapped. Some survived in British service to be used during World War II.

== Background and description ==
In British waters, drifters were a type of fishing vessel with hauled drift nets. This was adapted by the Royal Navy for anti-submarine defence in approaches to harbours and ports by laying drift nets and snagging enemy submarines. In January 1917 the Royal Navy ordered 100 drifters from Canadian shipyards as part of a building programme in Canada, managed by the Canadian government for the Royal Navy. The Royal Canadian Navy did not have anyone qualified to run such a programme, so the Canadian government brought in the vice president of Canada Steamship Lines to manage it.

The drifters, whose hulls were made of wood, were 84 feet 0 inches (25.6 m) long with a beam of 19 feet 3 inches (5.9 m) and a draught of 10 feet 0 inches (3.0 m). The CD class had a displacement of 99 long tons (101 t). (Note: Gardiner & Gray^{p.104} state the displacement as roughly 175 long tons (178 t), while Silverstone^{p.124} has the displacement at 150 long tons (150 t).) The timber used in the drifters came from British Columbia. The vessels were propelled by a 225-indicated-horsepower (168 kW) vertical compound steam engine fed steam by one single-ended boiler, turning one screw. The drifters had a maximum speed of 9 knots (17 km/h). The ships were armed with one QF 6-pounder (57 mm) gun mounted forward. The main differences between them and their British-built counterparts were electric lighting instead of acetylene gas, a steam windlass instead of a capstan and the gun was further forward. The vessels had a standard ship's company of 23. A complaint against the design was the lack of separate officers quarters. The drift nets provided for use in anti-submarine warfare were 120 by 20 yards (110 by 18 m) and required large wharf areas to perform repairs and maintenance.

== Ships in class ==
CD-class naval drifter
Name	Builder	Completed	Notes
CD 1	Davie Shipbuilding, Lauzon, Quebec	4 September 1917	Renamed Ebbtide in November 1924, sold 1946.
CD 2	Davie Shipbuilding, Lauzon, Quebec	16 October 1917	Renamed Westby in 1922.
CD 3	Davie Shipbuilding, Lauzon, Quebec	29 September 1917	Renamed Corcovado in 1921.
CD 4	Davie Shipbuilding, Lauzon, Quebec	3 October 1917	
CD 5	Davie Shipbuilding, Lauzon, Quebec	11 October 1917	
CD 6	Davie Shipbuilding, Lauzon, Quebec	8 October 1917	Renamed Bay Queen in 1921.
CD 7	Davie Shipbuilding, Lauzon, Quebec	15 October 1917	Renamed Utterby in 1922.
CD 8	Davie Shipbuilding, Lauzon, Quebec	16 October 1917	
CD 9	Davie Shipbuilding, Lauzon, Quebec	17 October 1917	
CD 10	Davie Shipbuilding, Lauzon, Quebec	20 October 1917	Broken up in 1922.
CD 11	Davie Shipbuilding, Lauzon, Quebec	22 October 1917	In 1922, the vessel was renamed Rauceby. In 1925, the drifter was renamed Pointoise.
CD 12	Davie Shipbuilding, Lauzon, Quebec	23 October 1917	
CD 13	Davie Shipbuilding, Lauzon, Quebec	29 October 1917	Renamed Ewerby in 1923 and Locqueltas in 1925.
CD 14	Davie Shipbuilding, Lauzon, Quebec	30 October 1917	Renamed Gilby in 1922.
CD 15	Davie Shipbuilding, Lauzon, Quebec	31 October 1917	Renamed Bretonia in 1922.
CD 16	Davie Shipbuilding, Lauzon, Quebec	31 October 1917	
CD 17	Davie Shipbuilding, Lauzon, Quebec	8 November 1917	Renamed Stansgate in 1925.
CD 18	Davie Shipbuilding, Lauzon, Quebec	7 November 1917	Broken up in 1922.
CD 19	Davie Shipbuilding, Lauzon, Quebec	10 November 1917	Broken up in 1922.
CD 20	Davie Shipbuilding, Lauzon, Quebec	10 November 1917	In 1918, the vessel was renamed Guelph. Sold in 1921. (Note: College & Warlow^{p.127} have the vessel being renamed Guelph on 10 November 1917.)
CD 21	Davie Shipbuilding, Lauzon, Quebec	6 September 1917	Broken up 1922.
CD 22	Davie Shipbuilding, Lauzon, Quebec	12 November 1917	Renamed Gunby in 1922.
CD 23	Davie Shipbuilding, Lauzon, Quebec	14 November 1917	Renamed Blairmore I in 1924.
CD 24	Davie Shipbuilding, Lauzon, Quebec	17 November 1917	Renamed Daron in 1924 and broken up the same year.
CD 25	Davie Shipbuilding, Lauzon, Quebec	17 November 1917	Renamed Fenby in 1923.
CD 26	Davie Shipbuilding, Lauzon, Quebec	19 November 1917	Renamed Moon in 1924. Foundered in 1927.
CD 27	Davie Shipbuilding, Lauzon, Quebec	19 November 1917	Renamed Wop in 1921.
CD 28	Davie Shipbuilding, Lauzon, Quebec	21 November 1917	Renamed Graby in 1922 and Massabielle in 1923.
CD 29	Davie Shipbuilding, Lauzon, Quebec	21 November 1917	
CD 30	Davie Shipbuilding, Lauzon, Quebec	14 July 1918	Transferred to United States Navy upon completion. Returned to Canada in mid-1919 and sold.
CD 31	Davie Shipbuilding, Lauzon, Quebec	14 July 1918	Transferred to United States Navy upon completion. Returned to Canada in mid-1919 and sold. Renamed Araby in 1923.
CD 32	Davie Shipbuilding, Lauzon, Quebec		
CD 33	Davie Shipbuilding, Lauzon, Quebec		
CD 34	Davie Shipbuilding, Lauzon, Quebec		
CD 35	Davie Shipbuilding, Lauzon, Quebec		
CD 36	Davie Shipbuilding, Lauzon, Quebec	14 July 1918	Transferred to United States Navy upon completion. Returned to Canada in mid-1919 and sold. Renamed Margaret Mac in 1920.
CD 37	Davie Shipbuilding, Lauzon, Quebec		
CD 38	Davie Shipbuilding, Lauzon, Quebec		
CD 39	Davie Shipbuilding, Lauzon, Quebec		
CD 40	Davie Shipbuilding, Lauzon, Quebec		
CD 41	Davie Shipbuilding, Lauzon, Quebec	14 July 1918	Transferred to United States Navy upon completion. Returned to Canada in mid-1919 and sold.
CD 42	Davie Shipbuilding, Lauzon, Quebec		
CD 43	Davie Shipbuilding, Lauzon, Quebec		Sold in 1920 and wrecked in 1921.
CD 44	Davie Shipbuilding, Lauzon, Quebec		
CD 45	Davie Shipbuilding, Lauzon, Quebec		
CD 46	Davie Shipbuilding, Lauzon, Quebec	14 July 1918	Transferred to United States Navy upon completion. Returned to Canada in mid-1919 and sold.
CD 47	Davie Shipbuilding, Lauzon, Quebec		
CD 48	Davie Shipbuilding, Lauzon, Quebec		
CD 49	Davie Shipbuilding, Lauzon, Quebec		
CD 50	Davie Shipbuilding, Lauzon, Quebec	14 July 1918	Transferred to United States Navy upon completion. Returned to Canada in mid-1919. The drifter became the Canadian Department of Marine and Fisheries vessel No. 21.
CD 51	Government Shipyards, Sorel, Quebec		
CD 52	Government Shipyards, Sorel, Quebec		
CD 53	Government Shipyards, Sorel, Quebec	12 November 1917	Renamed Karrier in 1922.
CD 54	Sorel Shipbuilding, Sorel, Quebec		Sunk in 1920 during passage to the United Kingdom.
CD 55	Sorel Shipbuilding, Sorel, Quebec		
CD 56	Sorel Shipbuilding, Sorel, Quebec		
CD 57	Sorel Shipbuilding, Sorel, Quebec		Sunk in 1920.
CD 58	Sorel Shipbuilding, Sorel, Quebec	14 October 1918	Transferred to United States Navy upon completion. Returned to Canada in mid-1919 and sold. Renamed Mary Currie in 1920.
CD 59	Sorel Shipbuilding, Sorel, Quebec	14 October 1918	Transferred to United States Navy upon completion. Returned to Canada in mid-1919 and sold. Renamed Two Roses in 1920.
CD 60	H.H. Sheppard & Sons, Sorel, Quebec		
CD 61	H.H. Sheppard & Sons, Sorel, Quebec	14 October 1918	Transferred to United States Navy upon completion. Returned to Canada in mid-1919 and sold.
CD 62	LeClaire & Sons, Sorel, Quebec		
CD 63	LeClaire & Sons, Sorel, Quebec		
CD 64	LeClaire & Sons, Sorel, Quebec		
CD 65	LeClaire & Sons, Sorel, Quebec	28 August 1918	Transferred to United States Navy upon completion. Returned to Canada in mid-1919 and sold. Renamed Metak in 1920.
CD 66	LeClaire & Sons, Sorel, Quebec		
CD 67	LeClaire & Sons, Sorel, Quebec	14 October 1918	Transferred to United States Navy upon completion. Returned to Canada in mid-1919 and sold.
CD 68	H.H. Sheppard & Sons, Sorel, Quebec	12 November 1917	
CD 69	H.H. Sheppard & Sons, Sorel, Quebec	20 October 1917	Renamed Ewerby and then Aline in 1921. Broken up in 1929.
CD 70	H.H. Sheppard & Sons, Sorel, Quebec		
CD 71	Canadian Vickers, Montreal, Quebec	22 October 1917	Renamed Eventide in 1923. Broken up in 1926.
CD 72	Canadian Vickers, Montreal, Quebec	23 October 1917	Renamed Floodtide in 1923. Broken up in 1926.
CD 73	Canadian Vickers, Montreal, Quebec	5 November 1917	Renamed Clixby in 1923 and Foi in 1925.
CD 74	Canadian Vickers, Montreal, Quebec	17 October 1917	Renamed Seagull in 1921 and broken up the same year.
CD 75	Canadian Vickers, Montreal, Quebec	19 October 1917	
CD 76	Canadian Vickers, Montreal, Quebec		
CD 77	Canadian Vickers, Montreal, Quebec		
CD 78	Canadian Vickers, Montreal, Quebec	14 October 1918	Transferred to United States Navy upon completion. Returned to Canada in mid-1919 and sold.
CD 79	Canadian Vickers, Montreal, Quebec		
CD 80	Canadian Vickers, Montreal, Quebec		
CD 81	Canadian Vickers, Montreal, Quebec		
CD 82	Canadian Vickers, Montreal, Quebec		Renamed Onyx in 1919 and Jade in August 1943. The vessel foundered in 1947, was raised and scuttled in 1947.
CD 83	Canadian Vickers, Montreal, Quebec		
CD 84	Canadian Vickers, Montreal, Quebec		
CD 85	Canadian Vickers, Montreal, Quebec		
CD 86	Canadian Vickers, Montreal, Quebec		Sunk in 1920 while on passage to the United Kingdom.
CD 87	Canadian Vickers, Montreal, Quebec	10 November 1917	Foundered in the North Atlantic on 12 October 1920 while on passage to United Kingdom.
CD 88	Canadian Vickers, Montreal, Quebec		Sunk in 1920 while on passage to the United Kingdom.
CD 89	Canadian Vickers, Montreal, Quebec		
CD 90	Canadian Vickers, Montreal, Quebec		
CD 91	Canadian Vickers, Montreal, Quebec		
CD 92	Canadian Vickers, Montreal, Quebec		
CD 93	Canadian Vickers, Montreal, Quebec		Sunk on passage to the United Kingdom in 1920.
CD 94	Canadian Vickers, Montreal, Quebec	5 August 1918	Transferred to United States Navy upon completion. Returned to Canada in mid-1919 and sold.
CD 95	Canadian Vickers, Montreal, Quebec		
CD 96	Canadian Vickers, Montreal, Quebec	14 October 1918	Transferred to United States Navy upon completion. Returned to Canada in mid-1919 and sold. (Note: Silverstone^{p.124} has the shipyard that constructed the vessel as the Harbour Commissioners of Montreal, Quebec .)
CD 97	Harbour Commissioners, Montreal, Quebec	14 October 1918	Transferred to United States Navy upon completion. Returned to Canada in mid-1919 and sold. Renamed Grace Hankinson in 1920. On 25 January 1930, the vessel was lost.
CD 98	Harbour Commissioners, Montreal, Quebec	14 October 1918	Transferred to United States Navy upon completion. Returned to Canada in mid-1919 and sold. Renamed Pearl Cann in 1921.
CD 99	Harbour Commissioners, Montreal, Quebec	14 October 1918	Transferred to United States Navy upon completion. Returned to Canada in mid-1919 and sold. Renamed Mary Francis Whalen in 1920 and Donnelly in 1925.
CD 100	Harbour Commissioners, Montreal, Quebec	14 October 1918	Transferred to United States Navy upon completion. Returned to Canada in mid-1919 and sold. Renamed Arichat in 1921.

== Service history ==
The drifters, though constructed in Canada, belonged to the Admiralty and were intended for use in British waters during World War I. In February 1917, the Royal Canadian Navy was informed that the drifters were to be transferred to Canada as part of the Admiralty's promise to support Canada's coastal patrol. Canada had not been informed prior to this and had been sending crews to the United Kingdom in preparation for the vessels' arrival. Canada did not want the drifters as they could neither catch nor kill a submarine nor did Canada have the manpower to crew the ships. Further difficulties arose when more training would be required as the drifter-type fishing vessel was not used in Canadian waters, and there was a lack of knowledge of the technology in Canada. In response the head of the Canadian naval service, Rear Admiral Charles Kingsmill ordered the drifter equipment removed on Canadian vessels and the drifters rearmed as patrol boats.

By October 1917, the Admiralty changed its position, requiring 50 drifters to be sent to British waters, with the remainder set aside for Canada. A further six were transferred from the Canadian allotment to the United States Navy as part of an exchange where two American torpedo boats and six submarine chasers patrolled off the Canadian Atlantic coast. Eventually, the British Admiralty settled on 42 drifters for Canadian service. Shortages of steel and marine fittings in Canadian yards led to delays. Further inexperience among Canadian builders in the construction of boilers and engines led to 42 of the former and 47 of the latter being built in the United States. Also affecting the construction was work stoppages and lack of workers after the American entry into the war as American shipbuilders began siphoning the work force with higher wages. After being completed the drifters being assembled in Quebec shipyards were sent to Quebec City to enter service and finish fitting out. The vessels began to arrive towards the end of 1917 with crews being sent from Halifax, Nova Scotia. Twenty-nine drifters entered service at Quebec City before the Saint Lawrence River froze over. The remaining drifters at Quebec City that had not finished fitting out were laid up through the winter months. Three unfinished hulls were destroyed at Sorel on 19 June 1917.

Some drifters were equipped with hydrophones and wireless telegraph to improve their anti-submarine detection abilities. Their 6-pounder guns were deemed inadequate to take on U-boats. Some drifters in Canadian service were crewed by detachments from the Newfoundland section of the Royal Naval Reserve. Canadian drifters were employed at the harbours of Halifax and Sydney, Nova Scotia, usually in concert with naval trawlers either on minesweeping or patrol missions. They were also used as convoy escorts for convoys entering and departing the harbours. The drifters were employed as "scarecrows", intending to force U-boats to look for easier targets. Though the vessels were poorly finished and the crews inexperienced, the drifters performed their task of deterring U-boats from convoy targets. In Royal Navy service fourteen of them were sent to Gibraltar, six to Bermuda and five were sent to West Africa in 1918–1919. In the end, 18 were transferred to the United States Navy, seeing service in the First Naval District. The drifters were returned to Canada in mid-1919 and sold.

After the war, the drifters in Canadian service were laid up in reserve at Halifax. On 5 November 1919 a storm struck Halifax Harbour in which 32 drifters were damaged. By 1920, most of the Canadian drifters had been sold, with the last four sold in 1921. Some of the British drifters saw service during World War II.

== See also ==
- List of Royal Navy ships
- List of ships of the Royal Canadian Navy
