= HMS Baleine =

Royal Navy frigate

History

Great Britain
- Name: HMS Baleine
- Builder: Lorient
- Laid down: 1755
- Launched: 24 May 1757
- Acquired: 19 October 1760
- Fate: Sold on 23 June 1767

General characteristics
- Class & type: 32-gun fifth-rate frigate
- Tons burthen: 702 70/94 bm
- Length: 149 ft 8 in (45.6 m) (overall); 129 ft 0.25 in (39.3 m) (keel)
- Beam: 32 ft (9.8 m)
- Depth of hold: 12 ft 9 in (3.89 m)
- Sail plan: Full-rigged ship
- Complement: 220
- Armament: Upper deck: 26 × 12-pounders; Quarter deck: 4 × 6-pounders; Forecastle: 2 × 6-pounders

HMS Baleine was a 32-gun fifth-rate frigate of the Royal Navy.

She had previously been the French East Indiaman Baleine, built at Lorient to a design by Antoine Groignard and launched on 24 May 1757. She was cut out of Pondicherry during the Third Carnatic War by the boats of HMS Southsea Castle, part of Admiral Charles Stevens' squadron. Stevens purchased her for service with the Royal Navy the following month.

She was commissioned under Captain Philip Affleck in 1762, and was under Captain Hyde Parker by 1764. Baleine arrived back in Britain in August 1764 and was surveyed at Chatham Dockyard the following month. She was not recommissioned, and after being surveyed in April 1767 she was put up for sale. She was sold on 23 June 1767 for £365 and was broken up.
