= HMCS Loon =

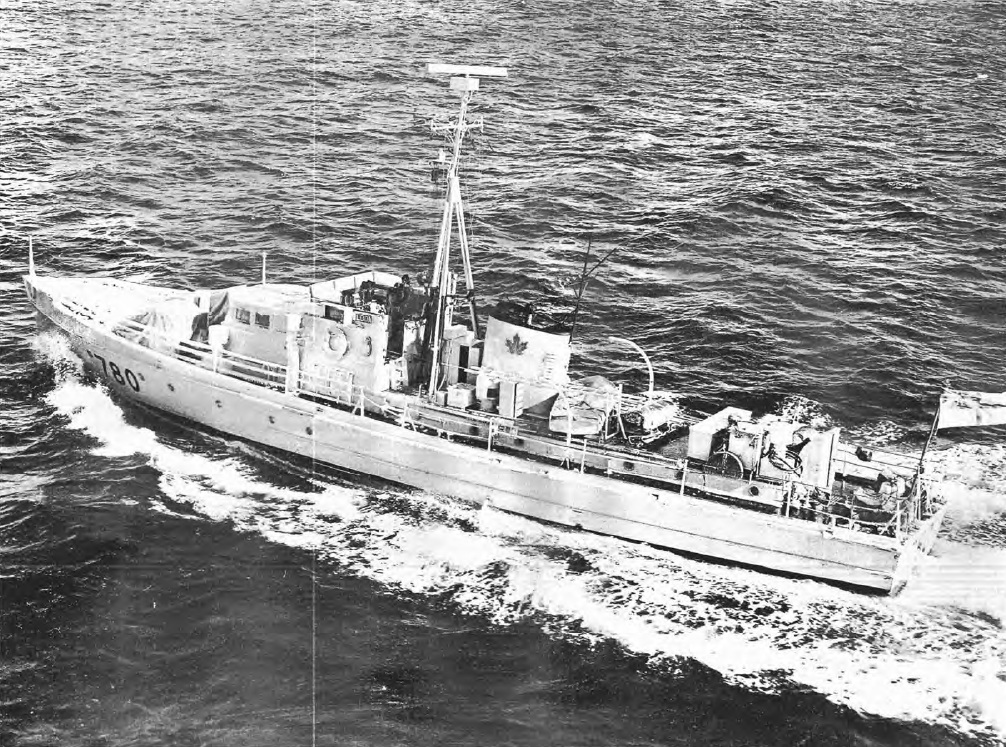
- HMCS Loon pictured in The Crowsnest magazine, 1962

History

Canada
- Name: Loon
- Namesake: Loon
- Builder: Taylor Boat Works, Toronto
- Launched: 4 October 1954
- Commissioned: 30 November 1955
- Decommissioned: 30 August 1965
- Identification: PCS 780
- Badge: Or, a loon proper, upon a base barry wavy of six azure and or

General characteristics
- Class & type: Bird-class patrol vessel
- Displacement: 66 long tons (67 t)
- Length: 92 ft (28 m) o/a
- Beam: 17 ft (5.2 m)
- Draught: 5.3 ft (1.6 m)
- Propulsion: 2 shaft diesel engines, 1200 bhp
- Speed: 14 kn (26 km/h; 16 mph)
- Complement: 2 officers, 19 ratings
- Armament: 1 × 20 mm gun; Hedgehog anti-submarine mortar

HMCS Loon was a Bird-class patrol vessel of the Royal Canadian Navy. The ship served from 1955 to 1965 before being discarded. The class was designed for harbour patrol.

== Design ==
Bird-class patrol vessels were designed for harbour patrol, training and anti-submarine warfare. Constructed of wood and aluminum, Loon displaced 66 long tons (67 t). She was 92 ft (28.0 m) long overall, with a beam of 17 ft (5.2 m) and a draught of 5.3 ft (1.6 m).

The Bird class were powered by diesel engines creating 1,200 brake horsepower (890 kW) connected to two shafts. This gave the ships a maximum speed of 14 knots (26 km/h; 16 mph). Loon was armed with one 20 mm gun and a Hedgehog anti-submarine mortar.

== Service ==
Loon's keel was laid down by Taylor Boat Works at their yard in Toronto and the vessel was launched on 4 October 1954. The ship was commissioned into the Royal Canadian Navy on 30 November 1955 with the pennant number PCS 780. After commissioning, Loon was used for training purposes. In 1961, Loon was assigned to Atlantic Command as a harbour patrol craft. She was used for air/sea rescue along the west coast of Canada. She was paid off on 30 August 1965.
