= HMCS Baleine =

History

Canada
- Name: Baleine
- Owner: Royal Canadian Navy
- Commissioned: 1 February 1915
- Decommissioned: 1919

General characteristics
- Class & type: minesweeper

HMCS Baleine was a minesweeper that saw service with the Royal Canadian Navy from 1915 to 1919, during the First World War. Converted from an ocean-going tug, the vessel was used as an auxiliary minesweeper under charter and crewed by civilians.
