= Canadian Bird-class patrol vessel =

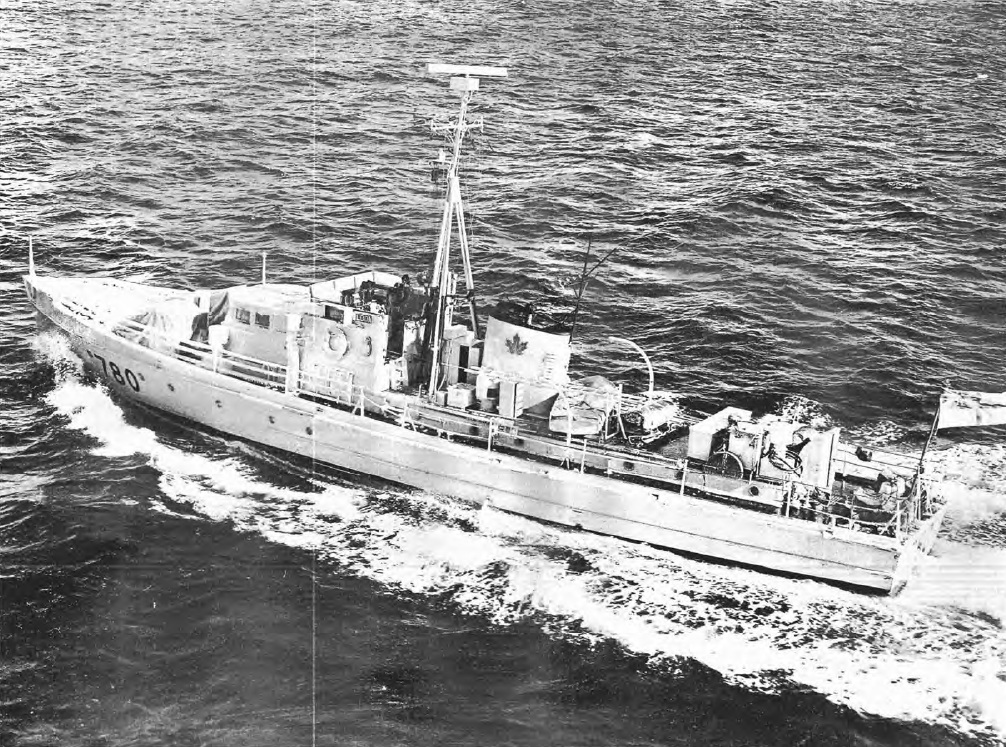
- HMCS Loon pictured in The Crowsnest magazine, 1962

Class overview
- Name: Bird class
- Builders: Various Ontario boatyards
- Operators: Royal Canadian Navy
- Preceded by: Fairmile B motor launch
- In commission: 30 November 1955 – 2 September 1965
- Planned: 8
- Completed: 4
- Canceled: 4
- Retired: 4

General characteristics
- Type: Patrol vessel
- Displacement: 66 long tons (67 t)
- Length: 92 ft (28 m) o/a
- Beam: 17 ft (5.2 m)
- Draught: 5.3 ft (1.6 m)
- Complement: 2 officers, 19 ratings
- Armament: 1 × 20 mm; 1 × Hedgehog anti-submarine mortar

The Bird-class patrol vessels were a class of seaward patrol vessels operated by the Royal Canadian Navy (RCN) during the Cold War. The class derives its name from large birds found in Canada and was designed by the RCN as a replacement for the remaining Second World War-era Fairmile motor launches used for coastal patrol.

== Design ==
Bird-class patrol vessels were designed for harbour patrol, training and anti-submarine warfare. Constructed of wood and aluminum, the Bird class displaced 66 long tons (67 t). The vessels were 92 ft (28 m) long overall, with a beam of 17 ft (5.2 m) and a draught of 5.3 ft (1.6 m). They had a complement of two officers and nineteen ratings.

The Bird class were powered by diesel engines creating 1,200 brake horsepower (890 kW) connected to two shafts. This gave the ships a maximum speed of 14 knots (26 km/h; 16 mph). The vessels were armed with one 20 mm gun and a Hedgehog anti-submarine mortar.

== Ships ==
Bird class construction data
Ship	Pennant number	Builder	Commissioned	Paid off	Fate
Loon	PCS 780	Taylor Boat Works, Toronto	30 November 1955	30 August 1965	Sold around 1970.
Cormorant	PCS 781	Birdland Boat Works, Midland	16 July 1956	23 May 1963	Sold around 1970.
Blue Heron	PCS 782	Hunter Boat Works, Orillia	30 July 1956	19 November 1956	Transferred to the RCMP.
Mallard	PCS 783	Grew Boat Works, Penetanguishene	16 July 1956	2 September 1965	Sold around 1970.
Arctic Tern	PCS 784	Planned but never built.			
Sandpiper	PCS 785	Planned but never built.			
Herring Gull	PCS 786	Planned but never built.			
Kingfisher	PCS 787	Planned but never built.			

== Service history ==
Loon was the first to commission, on 30 November 1955 at Toronto, Ontario. The vessel sailed to Halifax, Nova Scotia in December through treacherous ice conditions. Cormorant and Mallard were commissioned on 16 July 1956 at Midland, Ontario and Penetang, Ontario respectively. Blue Heron commissioned on 30 July 1956 at Orillia, Ontario and was allocated to the Royal Canadian Mounted Police Marine Division based at Halifax.

In 1961, Cormorant, Mallard and Loon were assigned to Atlantic Command as harbour patrol craft. In April 1961, Mallard was deployed to rescue the crew of the fishing vessel Ocean Wave which had run aground off Nova Scotia. The heavy seas prevented rescue by ship and the crew were taken off by helicopter.
