= HMCS Cormorant (PCS 781) =

History

Canada
- Name: Cormorant
- Namesake: Cormorant
- Builder: Midland Boat Works, Midland
- Launched: 15 May 1956
- Commissioned: 16 July 1956
- Decommissioned: 23 May 1963
- Badge: Argent, a cormorant volant, wings elevated proper, in base, three barrulets undy vert.

General characteristics
- Class & type: Bird-class patrol vessel
- Displacement: 66 long tons (67 t)
- Length: 92 ft (28.0 m) o/a
- Beam: 17 ft (5.2 m)
- Draught: 5.3 ft (1.6 m)
- Complement: 2 officers, 19 ratings
- Armament: 1 × 20 mm Oerlikon cannon; Hedgehog anti-submarine mortar

HMCS Cormorant (PCS 781) was a Bird-class patrol vessel of the Royal Canadian Navy. The patrol vessel entered service in 1956 and was paid off in 1963. Held in reserve, Cormorant was discarded in the 1970s.

== Design ==
Bird-class patrol vessels were designed for harbour patrol, training and anti-submarine warfare. Constructed of wood and aluminum, Cormorant displaced 66 long tons (67 t). She was 92 ft (28.0 m) long overall, with a beam of 17 ft (5.2 m) and a draught of 5.3 ft (1.6 m).

The Bird class were powered by diesel engines creating 1,200 brake horsepower (890 kW) connected to two shafts. This gave the ships a maximum speed of 14 knots (26 km/h; 16 mph). Cormorant was armed with one 20 mm Oerlikon cannon and a Hedgehog anti-submarine mortar.

== Construction and career ==
Cormorant was laid down by Midland Boat Works at Midland, Ontario and launched on 15 May 1956. The vessel was commissioned on 16 July 1956. The ship was intended to replace the remaining Fairmile motor launches that remained from the Second World War, performing cadet training and search and rescue operations along the coasts. In 1961, Cormorant was assigned to Atlantic Command as a harbour patrol craft. Cormorant was paid off on 23 May 1963 and placed in reserve alongside her sister ships. The Bird class was kept in reserve until discarded in 1970–1971.

== Sources ==
- Arbuckle, J. Graeme (1987). Badges of the Canadian Navy. Halifax, Nova Scotia: Nimbus Publishing. ISBN 0-920852-49-1.
- Gardiner, Robert; Chumbley, Stephen; Budzbon, Przemysław, eds. (1995). Conway's All the World's Fighting Ships 1947–1995. Annapolis, Maryland: Naval Institute Press. ISBN 1-55750-132-7.
- Macpherson, Ken; Barrie, Ron (2002). The Ships of Canada's Naval Forces 1910–2002 (Third ed.). St. Catharines, Ontario: Vanwell Publishing. ISBN 1-55125-072-1.
