= HMCS Thunder (MCB 161) =

History

Canada
- Name: Thunder
- Namesake: Thunder Bay
- Builder: Port Arthur Shipbuilding Co., Port Arthur
- Laid down: 1 September 1955
- Launched: 27 October 1956
- Commissioned: 3 March 1957
- Decommissioned: 22 August 1997
- Identification: MCB 161
- Honours and awards: Atlantic 1941–44, Normandy 1944, English Channel 1944–45
- Badge: Gules, a pile vert edged or, charged with a representation of the head of Thor, God of thunderstorms, affrontée, wearing a Nordic open crown composed of a circlet with eight arches all plain and meeting together in a point at the pinnacle, his beard formed into nine radiating coils each tapering to a point with a small spearhead at the end

General characteristics
- Class & type: Bay-class minesweeper
- Displacement: 390 long tons (400 t); 412 long tons (419 t) (deep load)
- Length: 152 ft (46 m)
- Beam: 28 ft (8.5 m)
- Draught: 8 ft (2.4 m)
- Propulsion: 2 shafts, 2 GM 12-cylinder diesels, 2,400 bhp (1,800 kW)
- Speed: 16 knots (30 km/h; 18 mph)
- Range: 3,290 nmi (6,090 km; 3,790 mi) at 12 kn (22 km/h; 14 mph)
- Complement: 38
- Armament: 1 × 40 mm Bofors gun

HMCS Thunder (hull number MCB 161) was a Bay-class minesweeper that served in the Royal Canadian Navy during the Cold War. The ship was named for Thunder Bay. This was the third vessel to carry the name and the second in the class, replacing a previous vessel sold to France. The minesweeper entered service in 1957 and was paid off in 1997.

== Design and description ==
The Bay class were designed and ordered as replacements for the Second World War-era minesweepers that the Royal Canadian Navy operated at the time. Similar to the Ton-class minesweeper, they were constructed of wood planking and aluminum framing.

Displacing 390 long tons (400 t) standard at 412 long tons (419 t) at deep load, the minesweepers were 152 ft (46 m) long with a beam of 28 ft (8.5 m) and a draught of 8 ft (2.4 m). They had a complement of 38 officers and ratings. (Note: Gardiner and Chumbley claim the complement was 40.)

The Bay-class minesweepers were powered by two GM 12-cylinder diesel engines driving two shafts creating 2,400 brake horsepower (1,800 kW). This gave the ships a maximum speed of 16 knots (30 km/h; 18 mph) and a range of 3,290 nautical miles (6,090 km; 3,790 mi) at 12 knots (22 km/h; 14 mph). The ships were armed with one 40 mm Bofors gun and were equipped with minesweeping gear.

== Service history ==
Thunder's keel was laid down on 1 September 1955 by Port Arthur Shipbuilding at Port Arthur, Ontario with the yard number 114 and launched 27 October 1956. The vessel was commissioned into the Royal Canadian Navy on 3 October 1957 with the hull identification number 161.

After commissioning, Thunder was sent west and served with Training Group Pacific. In 1972, the ship was re-designated a patrol escort and given the new hull number PF 161. In 1979, the vessel was designated a training ship and given the new hull number PB 161. Thunder was paid off on 22 August 1997. (Note: Colledge claims the ship was paid off in September 1997.)
