= List of Royal Canadian Navy ships of the Cold War =

The national flag served as the naval ensign from 1965–2013

As the Second World War drew to a close, the Royal Canadian Navy (RCN) stopped its rapid expansion and dramatically reduced military expenditures. This resulted in a significant reduction in personnel and ships by 1947. With the emergence of the Cold War and the formation of the North Atlantic Treaty Organization, followed by the outbreak of the Korean War, the Canadian government increased military spending. The RCN recommissioned and modified Second World War ships held in reserve, launched new classes of ships, and upgraded its aviation capabilities. The List of Royal Canadian Navy ships of the Cold War lists the surface warships, submarines and auxiliary vessels in service from the Korean War through to 1991. It includes all commissioned, non-commissioned, loaned or hired ships. and all ships crewed by RCN personnel under the command of the RCN.

This article lists vessels that were in Canadian military naval service in the timeframe from 1 January 1948 to 31 December 1991.

== Surface vessels ==
=== Aircraft carriers ===
- HMCS Bonaventure (CVL 22) (Majestic class)
- HMCS Magnificent (CVL 21) (Majestic class)
- HMCS Warrior (R31) (Colossus class)

=== Light cruisers ===
- HMCS Uganda (C66) (Crown Colony class, later renamed HMCS Quebec (C66))
- HMCS Ontario (C53) (Minotaur class)

=== Destroyers ===
- HMCS Iroquois (DDG 280) (Iroquois class)
- HMCS Huron (DDG 281) (Iroquois class)
- HMCS Athabaskan (DDG 282) (Iroquois class)
- HMCS Algonquin (DDG 283) (Iroquois class)
- HMCS Crescent (R16) (Cr class)
- HMCS Crusader (R20) (Cr class)
- HMCS Huron (G24) (Tribal class)
- HMCS Haida (G63) (Tribal class)
- HMCS Iroquois (G89) (Tribal class)
- HMCS Athabaskan (R79) (Tribal class)
- HMCS Cayuga (R04) (Tribal class)
- HMCS Micmac (R10) (Tribal class)
- HMCS Nootka (R96) (Tribal class)
- HMCS Algonquin (R17) (V class)
- HMCS Sioux (R64) (V class)

=== Destroyer escorts ===
- HMCS Annapolis (DDH 265) (II) (Annapolis class)
- HMCS Nipigon (DDH 266) (II)
- HMCS Mackenzie (DDE 261) (Mackenzie class)
- HMCS Saskatchewan (DDE 262) (II)
- HMCS Yukon (DDE 263)
- HMCS Qu'Appelle (DDE 264) (II)
- HMCS Chaudière (DDE 235) (II) (Restigouche class)
- HMCS Columbia (DDE 260) (II)
- HMCS Gatineau (DDE 236) (II)
- HMCS Kootenay (DDE 258) (II)
- HMCS Restigouche (DDE 257) (II)
- HMCS St. Croix (DDE 256) (II)
- HMCS Terra Nova (DDE 259)
- HMCS Assiniboine (DDH 234) (II) (St. Laurent class)
- HMCS Fraser (DDH 233) (II)
- HMCS Margaree (DDH 230) (II)
- HMCS Ottawa (DDH 229) (III)
- HMCS St. Laurent (DDH 205) (II)
- HMCS Skeena (DDH 207) (II)
- HMCS Saguenay (DDH 206) (II)

=== Frigates ===
- HMCS Prestonian (FFE 307) (Prestonian class)
- HMCS Antigonish (FFE 301)
- HMCS Stone Town (FFE 302)
- HMCS Beacon Hill (FFE 303)
- HMCS New Waterford (FFE 304)
- HMCS La Hulloise (FFE 305)
- HMCS Swansea (FFE 306)
- HMCS Inch Arran (FFE 308)
- HMCS Ste. Therese (FFE 309)
- HMCS Outremont (FFE 310)
- HMCS Stettler (FFE 311)
- HMCS Fort Erie (FFE 312)
- HMCS Sussexvale (FFE 313)
- HMCS Buckingham (FFE 314)
- HMCS New Glasgow (FFE 315)
- HMCS Penetang (FFE 316)
- HMCS Cap de la Madeleine (FFE 317)
- HMCS Jonquiere (FFE 318)
- HMCS Toronto (FFE 319)
- HMCS Victoriaville (FFE 320)
- HMCS Lanark (FFE 321)
- HMCS Lauzon (FFE 322)
- HMCS St. Stephen (FFE 323)
- HMCS St. Catharines (FFE 324)

=== Minesweepers ===
- HMCS Chaleur (MCB 144) (I) (Bay class)
- HMCS Chaleur (MCB 164) (II)
- HMCS Chignecto (MCB 156) (II)
- HMCS Chignecto (MCB 160) (III)
- HMCS Comox (MCB 146) (II)
- HMCS Cowichan (MCB 147) (II)
- HMCS Cowichan (MCB 162) (III)
- HMCS Fortune (MCB 151)
- HMCS Fundy (MCB 145) (II)
- HMCS Fundy (MCB 159) (III)
- HMCS Gaspé (MCB 143) (II)
- HMCS James Bay (MCB 152)
- HMCS Miramichi (MCB 150) (II)
- HMCS Miramichi (MCB 163) (III)
- HMCS Quinte (MCB 149) (II)
- HMCS Resolute (MCB 154)
- HMCS Thunder (MCB 153) (II)
- HMCS Thunder (MCB 161) (III)
- HMCS Trinity (MCB 157)
- HMCS Ungava (MCB 148) (II)
- HMCS Kapuskasing (J326) (Algerine class)
- HMCS New Liskeard (J397) (Algerine class)
- HMCS Oshawa (J330) (Algerine class)
- HMCS Portage (J331) (Algerine class)
- HMCS Rockcliffe (J335) (Algerine class)
- HMCS Sault Ste. Marie (J334) (Algerine class)
- HMCS Wallaceburg (J336) (Algerine class)
- HMCS Brockville (Bangor class)
- HMCS Digby (Bangor class)
- HMCS Kentville (Bangor class)
- HMCS Minas (Bangor class)

=== Patrol vessels ===
- HMCS Acadian (Detachment class)
- HMCS Adversus (PB 191) (II)
- HMCS Captor (II)
- HMCS Arctic Tern (PCS 784) (Bird class)
- HMCS Blue Heron (PCS 782) (Bird)
- HMCS Cormorant (PCS 781) (I) (Bird)
- HMCS Herring Gull (PCS 786) (Bird)
- HMCS Kingfisher (PCS 787) (Bird)
- HMCS Loon (PCS 780) (Bird)
- HMCS Mallard (PCS 783) (Bird)
- HMCS Sandpiper (PCS 785) (Bird)
- HMCS Rally (PB 141) (Racer class)
- HMCS Rapid (PB 142) (Racer)
- HMCS Sidney

== Submarines ==
- HMCS Grilse (SS 71) (II) (Balao class)
- HMCS Ojibwa (S72) (Oberon class)
- HMCS Okanagan (S74)
- HMCS Onondaga (S73)
- HMCS Rainbow (SS 75) (II) (Tench class)

== Auxiliaries ==
=== Auxiliary minesweeping ===
- HMCS Anticosti (MSA 110) (II) (Anticosti class)
- HMCS Moresby (MSA 112) (III)
- HMCS Cordova (MCA 158) (YMS-1 class)

=== Diving support ship ===
- HMCS Cormorant (ASL 20) (II)

=== Escort maintenance ships ===
- HMCS Cape Breton (ARE 100) (Cape class)
- HMCS Cape Scott (ARE 101)

=== Fireboats ===
- CFAV Firebird (YTR 561)
- CFAV Firebrand (YTR 562)

=== Gate vessels ===
- HMCS Porte Dauphine (YMG 186) (Porte class)
- HMCS Porte de la Reine (YMG 184)
- HMCS Porte Quebec (YMG 185)
- HMCS Porte St. Jean (YMG 180)
- HMCS Porte St. Louis (YMG 183)

=== High Speed Launch vessels ===
- HSL-208 (ex-RCMP M208)
- HSL-231 (ex-RCMP M231)
- HSL-232 (ex-RCMP M232)
- HSL-233 (ex-RCMP M233)
- HSL-234 (ex-RCMP M234)
- HSL-235 (ex-RCMP M235)

=== Hydrofoil prototype ===
- HMCS Baddeck (R-103), ex-HMCS Bras d'Or (R-103) (I)
- HMCS Bras d'Or (FHE 400) (II)

=== Icebreaker ===
- HMCS Labrador (AW 50) (Wind class)

=== Replenishment ships ===
- HMCS Protecteur (AOR 509) (Protecteur class)
- HMCS Preserver (AOR 510)
- HMCS Provider (AOR 508) (Provider class)
- CFAV Dundalk (Dun class)
- CFAV Dundurn (Dun class)
- CNAV Eastore

=== Research vessel ===
- CNAV Laymore (ex-HMCS Laymore)
- CNAV Whitethroat (ex-HMCS Whitethroat)

=== Survey ships ===
- CFAV Bluethroat (AGOR 114)
- HMCS Cedarwood (AGSC 539)
- HMCS Endeavour (AGOR 171) (Endeavour class)
- CFAV Quest (AGOR 172)
- HMCS Vancouver (IV)

=== Training vessels ===
- HMCS Beaver (PTC 706, ex-ML Q106) (II)
- CFAV Fort Steele
- HMCS Oriole

=== Tugboats ===
- CFAV Glendyne (YTB 640) (Glen class 1975)
- CFAV Glendale (YTB 641)
- CFAV Glenevis (YTB 642)
- CFAV Glenbrook (YTB 643)
- CFAV Glenside (YTB 644)
- CFAV Lawrenceville (YTL 590) (Ville class)
- CFAV Parksville (YTL 591)
- CFAV Listerville (YTL 592)
- CFAV Merrickville (YTL 593)
- CFAV Marysville (YTL 594)
- CFAV Saint Anthony (ATA 531) (Saint class)
- CFAV Saint Charles (ATA 533)
- CFAV St John (ATA)
- CNAV Glendyne
- CNAV Glenlivet

=== Utility and other boats ===
- CFAV Albatross (YAG 661)
- CFAV Badger (YAG 319)
- CFAV Blackduck (YAG 660)
- CFAV Caribou (YAG 314)
- CFAV Gemini (YAG 650)
- CFAV Grizzly (YAG 306)
- CFAV Lynx (YAG 320)
- CFAV Pegasus (YAG 651)
- CFAV Pelican (YAG 4)
- CFAV Otter (YAG 312)
- CFAV Wolf (YAG 308)

=== Yard diving tenders ===
- CFAV Granby (YDT 12) (Note: The vessel was later replaced by HMCS Victoriaville, which took the Granby name as well as the hull number)
- CFAV Raccoon (YDT 10)
- Unnamed (YDT 11)

=== Submarine non-operational ===
- ex-HMS Olympus – training ship
- ex-HMS Osiris – stripped for parts in UK

== See also ==
- Royal Canadian Navy
- Origins of the Royal Canadian Navy
- History of the Royal Canadian Navy
- List of ships of the Royal Canadian Navy
- Hull classification symbol (Canada)
- His Majesty's Canadian Ship
- List of aircraft of the Royal Canadian Navy
- List of Royal Canadian Navy ships of the First World War
- List of Royal Canadian Navy ships of the Second World War

== Bibliography and further reading ==
- Blatherwick, F.J. (1992). Royal Canadian Navy honours, decorations, medals, 1910-1968. FJB Air Publications, New Westminster.
- Colledge, J. J.; Warlow, Ben (2006) [1969]. Ships of the Royal Navy: The Complete Record of All Fighting Ships of the Royal Navy from the 15th Century to the Present (3rd Rev ed.). London: Chatham Publishing. ISBN 978-1-86176-281-8. OCLC 67375475.
- Dittmar, F.J.; College, J.J. (1972). British Warships, 1914-1919. Alan, London.
- Douglas, W.A.B.; et al. (2004). No Higher Purpose: The Official Operational History of the Royal Canadian Navy in the Second World War, 1939-1943. Volume II, Part I. Vanwell, St. Catharines.
- Douglas, W.A.B.; et al. (2007). A Blue Water Navy: The Official Operational History of the Royal Canadian Navy in the Second World War – 1943-1945, Volume II, Part 2. Vanwell, St. Catharines.
- Gimblett, Richard H., ed. (2009). The Naval Service of Canada 1910-2010: The Centennial Story. Toronto: Dundurn Press. ISBN 978-1-4597-1322-2.
- Gimblett, Richard H.; Hadley, Michael L., eds. (2010). Citizen Sailors: Chronicles of Canada's Naval Reserve. Toronto: Dundurn Press. ISBN 978-1-55488-867-2.
- Johnston, William; Rawling, William G.P.; Gimblett, Richard H.; MacFarlane, John (2010). The Seabound Coast: The Official History of the Royal Canadian Navy, 1867-1939. Vol. 1. Toronto: Dundurn Press. ISBN 978-1-55488-908-2.
- Macpherson, Ken; Barrie, Ron (2002). The Ships of Canada's Naval Forces 1910-2002 (Third ed.). St. Catharines, Ontario: Vanwell Publishing. ISBN 1-55125-072-1.
- Milner, Marc (2010). Canada's Navy: The First Century (Second ed.). Toronto: University of Toronto Press. ISBN 978-0-8020-9604-3.
- Office of Naval Intelligence (1944). Index to Warships of the British Commonwealth (PDF). US Government Printing Office.
- Tucker, Gilbert (1952). The Naval Service of Canada : Its Official History Vol 2, Activities on Shore During the Second World War. King's Printer, Ottawa.
