= List of mine warfare vessels of the Turkish Navy =

This is a list of Turkish Navy mine warfare vessels that have served past and present, from 10 July 1920 to present.

== Minelayers ==
=== Atak ===
Name	Builder	Launched	Acquired	Service years
Atak				1938-early 1960s

=== Sivrihisar class ===
Name	Builder	Launched	Acquired	Service years
Sivrihisar	Thornycroft			1940–1960
Turgut Reis	Thornycroft			1940–1960

=== Danish Falster class ===
Nusret class ( (Denmark) Falster class):

Name	Builder	Launched	Acquired	Fate
TCG Nusret (N-110)	Schiffs & Maschinenbau AG Germania, Kiel, German Empire	4 December 1911	1913	Decommissioned & laid up for conversion to a museum ship in October 1918, sold in 1962 to commercial interests, rebuilt 1962-66 as general cargo motorship, capsized in April 1989, salvaged in 1999 and made into a memorial/museum ship in 2003

=== Ex-US LSM 1 class coastal minelayer ===
Mordoğan class: (Ex- (United States) LSM-1 class Landing Ship Medium):

Name	Builder	Launched	Acquired	Fate
TCG Mordoğan (N-101)		Ex-USS LSM-484	after 1944-45	
TCG Meriç (N-102)		Ex-USS LSM-490	after 1944-45	
TCG Marmaris (N-103)		Ex-USS LSM-481	after 1944-45	
TCG Mersin (N-104)		Ex-USS LSM-493	after 1944-45	
TCG Mürefte (N-105)		Ex-USS LSM-492	after 1944-45	

=== Minehunters ===
==== Engin class ====
Engin class minehunter (Edincik class minehunter, (France) Circe class minehunter):

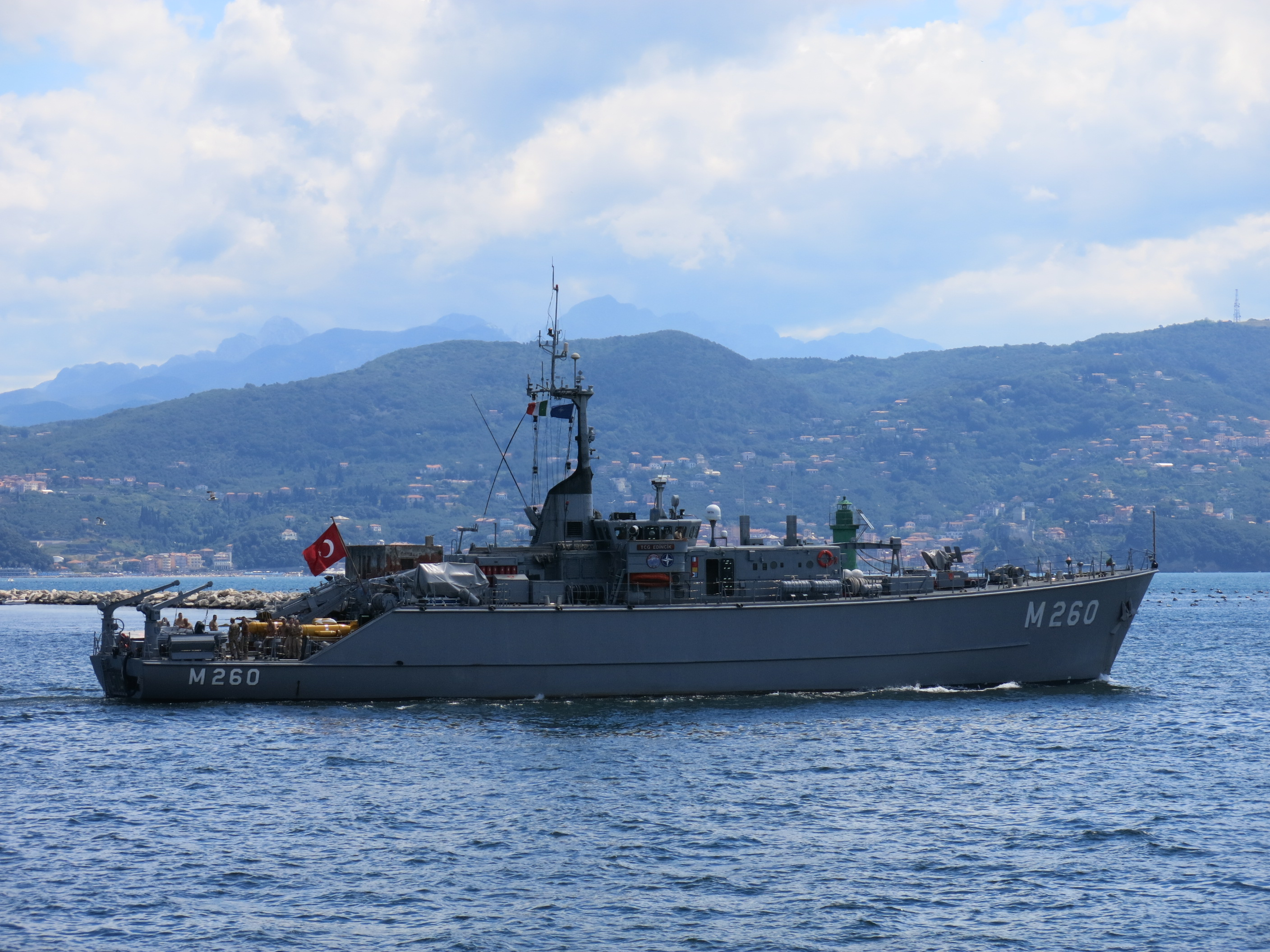
TCG Edincik (M-260)

Name	Builder	Launched	Acquired	Fate
TCG Edincik (M-260)		Ex-FS Calliope (M-713)		active
TCG Edremit (M-261)		Ex-FS Circe (M-715)		active
TCG Enez (M-262)		Ex-FS Ceres (M-716)		active
TCG Erdek (M-263)		Ex-FS Cybele (M-712)		active
TCG Erdemli (M-264)		Ex-FS Clio (M-714)		active

==== Aydın class ====
Aydın-class minehunter (subclass of (Germany) Fr. Lürssen Werft GmbH & Co. KG Frankenthal-class minehunter):

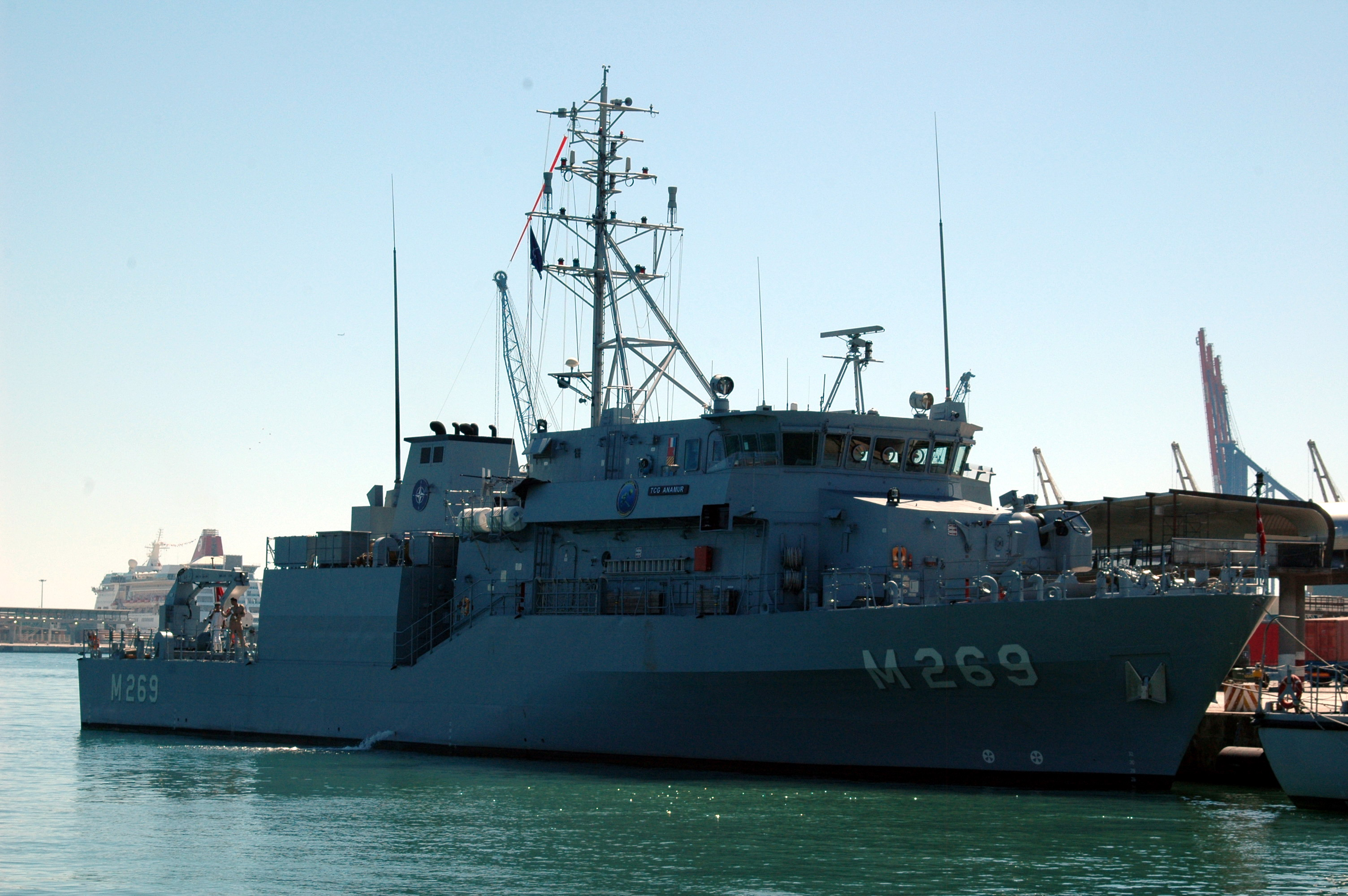
TCG Anamur (M-269)

Name	Builder	Launched	Acquired	Fate
TCG Alanya (M-265)	Lürssen, Abeking & Rasmussen		26 July 2005	active
TCG Amasra (M-266)	Istanbul Naval Yard		26 July 2005	active
TCG Ayvalık (M-267)	Istanbul Naval Yard		22 June 2007	active
TCG Akçakoca (M-268)	Istanbul Naval Yard		17 September 2007	active
TCG Anamur (M-269)	Istanbul Naval Yard			active
TCG Akçay (M-270)	Istanbul Naval Yard			active

=== Minesweeper ===
==== Kavak class coastal minesweeper ====
Name	Builder	Launched	Acquired	Service years
Kavak				1937–1950s
Çanak				1937–1950

==== Ex-US YMS type ====
K class minesweeper (Ex-US YMS type inshore minesweeper):

Name	Builder	Launched	Acquired	Fate
Kas	35 yacht builders	Ex-USS YMS-79		in service no later than 13 December 1957
Kilimli	35 yacht builders	Ex-USS YMS-289		in service no later than 13 December 1957
Kozlu	35 yacht builders	Ex-USS YMS-348		in service no later than 13 December 1957
Kuşadası	35 yacht builders	Ex-USS YMS-468		in service no later than 13 December 1957
Kemer	35 yacht builders	Ex-USS YMS-228		in service no later than 13 December 1957
Kerempe	35 yacht builders	Ex-USS YMS-239		in service no later than 13 December 1957
Kirte	35 yacht builders	Ex-USS YMS-307		in service no later than 13 December 1957
Karamürsel	35 yacht builders	Ex-Küllük, Ex-USS YMS-375		in service no later than 13 December 1957

==== Ex-US Cape class ====
F class minesweeper (Foça class minesweeper, (United States) Cape class inshore minesweeper):

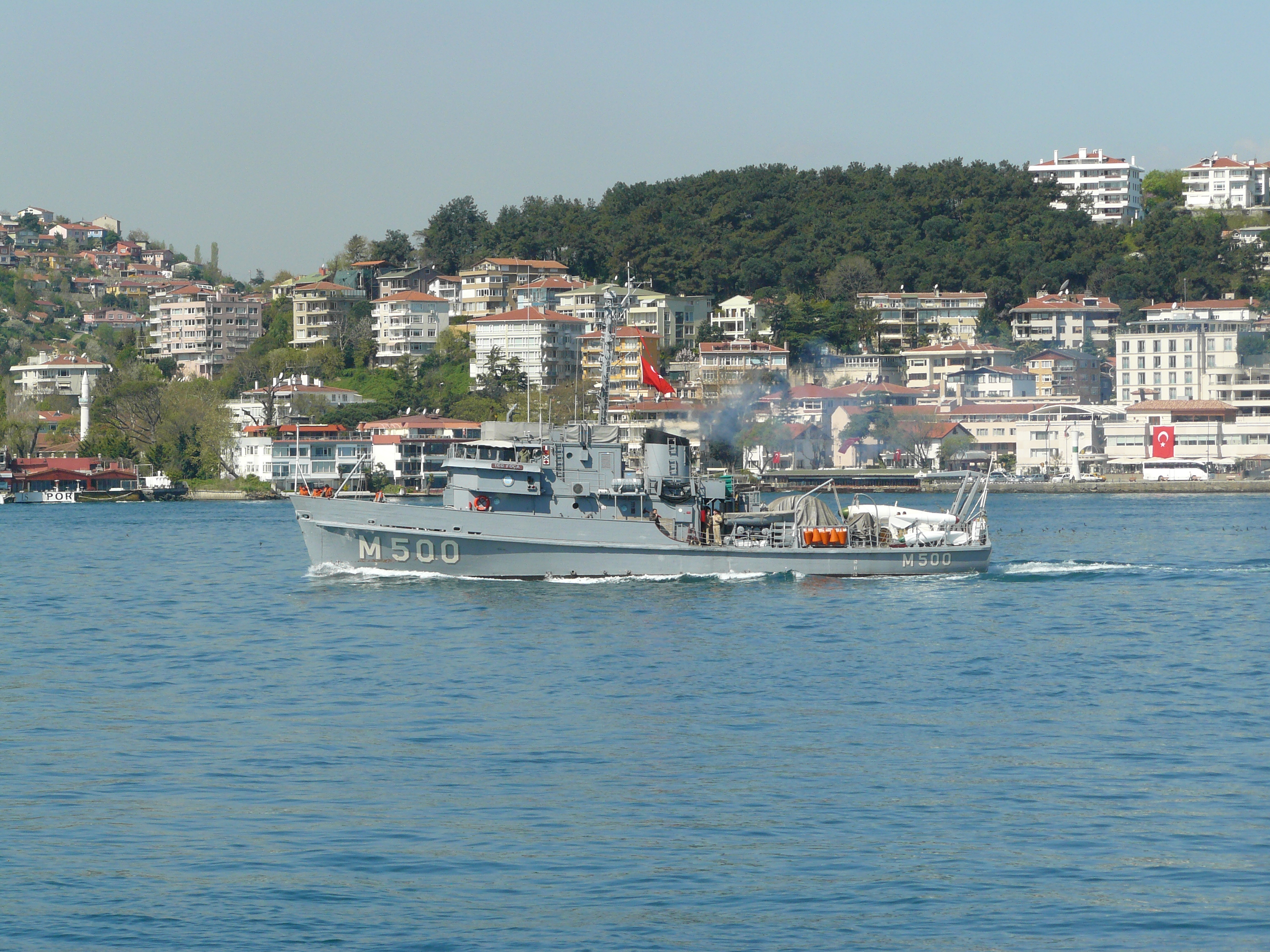
TCG Foça (M-500)

Name	Builder	Launched	Acquired	Fate
TCG Foça (M-500)		Ex-USS MSI-15		Extant in 2010-13
TCG Fethiye (M-501)		Ex-USS MSI-16		Extant in 2010
TCG Fatsa (M-502)		Ex-USS MSI-17		Extant in 2010
TCG Finike (M-503)		Ex-USS MSI-18		Extant in 2010

==== Redwing class early type ====
S class minesweeper ( (United States) Redwing class early type coastal minesweeper):

Name	Builder	Launched	Acquired	Fate
TCG Samsun (M-510)	Bellingham Shipyards Bellingham, Washington	Ex-USS MSC-268	6 September 1957	struck 2005
TCG Sinop (M-511)	Bellingham Shipyards Bellingham, Washington	Ex-USS MSC-270	4 January 1958	struck 2004
TCG Sürmene (M-512)	Bellingham Shipyards Bellingham, Washington	Ex-USS MSC-271	1958	struck 2005
TCG Seddülbahir (M-513)	Bellingham Shipyards Bellingham, Washington	Ex-USS MSC-272	1958	struck 2005

==== Redwing class later type ====
S class minesweeper ( (United States) Redwing class later type coastal minesweeper):

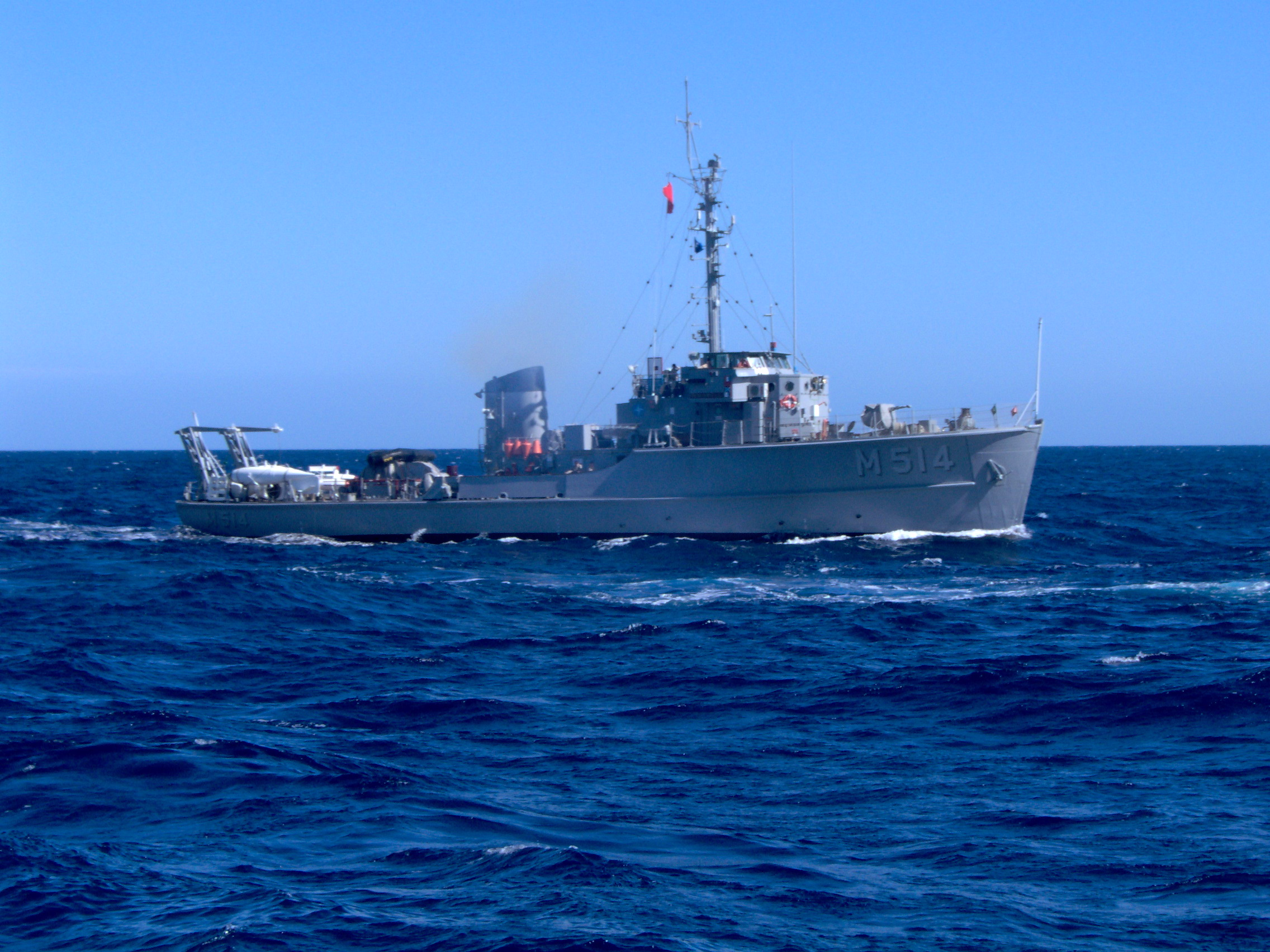
TCG Silifke (M-514)

Name	Builder	Launched	Acquired	Fate
TCG Silifke (M-514)	Dorchester Shipbuilding Corp. Dorchester, New Jersey	Ex-USS MSC-304	21 November 1964	Extant in 2010
TCG Saros (M-515)	Dorchester Shipbuilding Corp. Dorchester, New Jersey	Ex-USS MSC-305	1 May 1965	in service as of 2015
TCG Sığacık (M-516)	Peterson Builders Sturgeon Bay, WI	Ex-USS MSC-311	1 May 1965	in service as of 2015 scrapped in Aliaga in 2018
TCG Sapanca (M-517)	Peterson Builders Sturgeon Bay, WI	Ex-USS MSC-312	14 September 1964	in service as of 2015
TCG Sarıyer (M-518)	Peterson Builders Sturgeon Bay, WI	Ex USS-MSC-315	21 April 1966	in service as of 2015 scrapped in Aliaga in 2018

==== Adjutant class ====
S class minesweeper ( (United States) Adjutant class minesweeper):

Name	Builder	Launched	Acquired	Fate
TCG Seymen (M-507)	Hiltebrant Drydock Co. Kingston, New York	Ex-Belgian Navy De Panne	1969	
TCG Selçuk (M-508)	Stephen Brothers, Inc. Stockton, California	21 November 1953 as Ex-French Navy Pavot	24 March 1970	reclassified as survey vessel, April 1998
TCG Seyhan (M-509)	South Coast Shipyard Newport Beach, California	22 May 1953 as Ex-French Navy Renoncule	24 March 1970	struck 1998

==== Ex-French Mercure class ====
Karamürsel class minesweeper (Ex- (Germany) Vegesack class minesweeper) -> K class patrol boat:

Name	Builder	Launched	Acquired	Fate
TCG Karamürsel (M-520)		Ex-M-1253 Worms		TCG Karamürsel (P-307) Extant in 2010
TCG Kerempe (M-521)		Ex-M-1252 Detmold		TCG Kerempe (P-308) Extant in 2010
TCG Kilimli (M-522)		Ex-M-1254 Siegen		TCG Kilimli (P-309) Extant in 2010
TCG Kozlu (M-523)		Ex-M-1251 Hameln		TCG Kozlu (P-301) Extant in 2010
TCG Kuşadası (M-524)		Ex-M-1250 Vegesack		TCG Kuşadası (P-302) Extant in 2010
TCG Kemer (M-525)		Ex-M-1255 Passau		

==== Ex-Canadian Bay class ====
Trabzon-class minesweeper: (Canada) Bay-class minesweeper -> T class patrol boat:

Name	Builder	Launched	Acquired	Fate
TCG Trabzon (M-530)	Davie Shipbuilding, Lauzon, Quebec	12 November 1951 as Ex-HMCS Gaspé (MCB 143)	31 March 1958	in service until 1991
TCG Terme (M-531)	Davie Shipbuilding, Lauzon, Quebec	31 July 1953 as Ex-HMCS Trinity (MCB 157)	31 March 1958	in service until 1991
TCG Tirebolu (M-532)	Victoria Machinery Depot, Victoria, British Columbia	24 April 1952 as Ex-HMCS Comox (MCB 146)	31 March 1958	sold in 1996
TCG Tekirdağ (M-533)	Davie Shipbuilding, Lauzon, Quebec	20 May 1953 as Ex-HMCS Ungava (MCB 148)	31 March 1958	in service until 1991, then broken up for scrap at Aliağa, Turkey in 2002
