= HMCS Fundy =

Three Canadian naval units have been named HMCS Fundy.

- HMCS Fundy (J88), a Fundy-class minesweeper that served the Royal Canadian Navy from 1938 to 1945.
- HMCS Fundy (MCB 145), a Bay-class minesweeper sold to France as La Dunkerquoise in 1954, stricken 1984.
- HMCS Fundy (MCB 159), a Bay-class minesweeper that served Canada from 1956 to 1996.

== Battle honours ==
- Atlantic, 1939–45

== See also ==
- Fundy-class minesweeper, a Canadian minesweeper class
