= HMCS Chignecto =

Three Canadian naval units have carried the name HMCS Chignecto.

- HMCS Chignecto (J160) (I) was a Second World War Bangor-class minesweeper. Commissioned in October 1941, she was paid off in November 1945.
- HMCS Chignecto (MCB 156) (II) was a Bay-class minesweeper. Commissioned in December 1953, she was paid off in March 1954 and sold to France.
- HMCS Chignecto (MCB 160) (III), also a Bay-class minesweeper, was commissioned in August 1957.
