= TCG Tekirdağ =

TCG Tekirdağ is the name of the following ships of the Turkish Navy:

- TCG Tekirdağ (M 533), ex-HMCS Ungava (MCB 148), a Bay-class minesweeper acquired in 1958, removed from service in 1991, broken up in 2002
- TCG Tekirdağ (P 1207), a Tuzla-class patrol boat commissioned in 2013

== See also ==
- Tekirdağ
