= HMCS Chaleur =

Several Canadian naval units have been named HMCS Chaleur.

- HMCS Chaleur I was an RCMP patrol vessel transferred to the Royal Canadian Navy in September 1939. It was renamed Chaleur I and stationed at Saint Jean on Île-d'Orléans to inspect ships in the St. Lawrence River heading to Quebec City.
- HMCS Chaleur II was a Royal Canadian Navy shore establishment in Quebec City that derived its name from HMCS Chaleur I.
- HMCS Chaleur (MCB 144) (I) was a Bay-class minesweeper that served with the Royal Canadian Navy from June–September 1954 before being sold to France as La Dieppoise. The name Chaleur was chosen in honour of the service of Chaleur I and Chaleur II during World War II.
- HMCS Chaleur (MCB 164) (II) was a Bay-class minesweeper that served in the Royal Canadian Navy and later the Canadian Forces from 1957–1999. This ship used the same name as the first Chaleur but was issued a different pennant.
