= HMCS Quinte =

Several Canadian naval units have been named HMCS Quinte;

- HMCS Quinte (J166), a Bangor-class minesweeper that entered service in 1941 and was discarded in 1947.
- HMCS Quinte (MCB 149), a Bay-class minesweeper that entered service in 1954 and was discarded in 1965.

== Battle honours ==
- Atlantic, 1941-42.
