= Chaleur =

Chaleur (French for "warmth") may refer to:

- Chaleur Bay, or Baie des Chaleurs in Canada between Quebec and New Brunswick
- Chaleur Rural District, a rural governance body in New Brunswick
- Montreal – Gaspé train, formerly the Chaleur.
- Fireship of Baie des Chaleurs, an apparition reported on Chaleur Bay
- HMCS Chaleur, a name given to several Canadian ships
