= James Bay (disambiguation) =

James Bay is a large body of water on the southern end of the Hudson Bay in Canada.

James Bay may also refer to:

- Baie-James, a former municipality in Canada
- James Bay Project, a hydroelectric power initiative in Quebec, Canada
- James Bay, Greater Victoria, a neighbourhood of Victoria, British Columbia, Canada
- James Bay (singer) (born 1990), English singer-songwriter
- HMCS James Bay, a Royal Canadian Navy minesweeper
