= HMCS James Bay =

Royal Canadian minesweeper ship

History

Canada
- Name: James Bay
- Namesake: James Bay
- Builder: Yarrows Ltd., Esquimalt
- Laid down: 16 August 1951
- Launched: 12 March 1953
- Commissioned: 3 May 1954
- Decommissioned: 28 February 1964
- Identification: MCB 152
- Motto: "The true north strong and free"
- Badge: Argent, a pile azure, in the base of which a lymphad with banner of the first, sail unfurled charged with a cross gules and surmounting the mast a sun in splendour or charged with two lines in cross sable

General characteristics
- Class & type: Bay-class minesweeper
- Displacement: 390 long tons (400 t); 412 long tons (419 t) (deep load)
- Length: 152 ft (46 m)
- Beam: 28 ft (8.5 m)
- Draught: 8 ft (2.4 m)
- Propulsion: 2 shafts, 2 GM 12-cylinder diesels, 2,400 bhp (1,800 kW)
- Speed: 16 knots (30 km/h; 18 mph)
- Range: 3,290 nmi (6,090 km; 3,790 mi) at 12 kn (22 km/h; 14 mph)
- Complement: 38
- Armament: 1 × 40 mm Bofors gun

HMCS James Bay (hull number MCB 152) was a Bay-class minesweeper that was constructed for the Royal Canadian Navy during the Cold War. Entering service in 1954, the ship served on the West Coast of Canada until 1964 when James Bay was decommissioned. The minesweeper was sold in 1966 for use as an offshore oil exploration vessel.

== Design and description ==
The Bay class were designed and ordered as replacements for the Second World War-era minesweepers that the Royal Canadian Navy operated at the time. Similar to the Ton-class minesweeper, they were constructed of wood planking and aluminum framing.

Displacing 390 long tons (400 t) standard at 412 long tons (419 t) at deep load, the minesweepers were 152 ft (46 m) long with a beam of 28 ft (8.5 m) and a draught of 8 ft (2.4 m). They had a complement of 38 officers and ratings. (Note: Gardiner and Chumbley claim the complement was 40.)

The Bay-class minesweepers were powered by two GM 12-cylinder diesel engines driving two shafts creating 2,400 brake horsepower (1,800 kW). This gave the ships a maximum speed of 16 knots (30 km/h; 18 mph) and a range of 3,290 nautical miles (6,090 km; 3,790 mi) at 12 knots (22 km/h; 14 mph). The ships were armed with one 40 mm Bofors gun and were equipped with minesweeping gear.

== Operational history ==
The ship's keel was laid down on 16 August 1951 by Yarrows Ltd. in Esquimalt, British Columbia. Initially named Chantry, the vessel was renamed for a bay located between Ontario and Quebec with islands that are part of Nunavut within. James Bay was launched on 12 March 1953. The ship was commissioned on 3 May 1954.

The Second Canadian Minesweeping Squadron was formed in May 1954 at Esquimalt with Comox and James Bay as the first two vessels of the unit. Serving on the West Coast of Canada, in November 1955, the Second Canadian Minesweeping Squadron was among the Canadian units that took part a large naval exercise off the coast of California. The Second Minesweeping Squadron, of which James Bay was a member made a port visit at Stockton, California in June 1960. The vessel was paid off on 28 February 1964. James Bay was sold to commercial interests in 1966 for use in offshore oil exploration.

== Notes ==
=== References ===
- Arbuckle, J. Graeme (1987). Badges of the Canadian Navy. Halifax, Nova Scotia: Nimbus Publishing. ISBN 0-920852-49-1.
- Colledge, J. J.; Warlow, Ben (2006) [1969]. Ships of the Royal Navy: The Complete Record of All Fighting Ships of the Royal Navy from the 15th Century to the Present (3rd Rev ed.). London: Chatham Publishing. ISBN 978-1-86176-281-8. OCLC 67375475.
- Gardiner, Robert; Chumbley, Stephen; Budzbon, Przemysław, eds. (1995). Conway's All the World's Fighting Ships 1947–1995. Annapolis, Maryland: Naval Institute Press. ISBN 1-55750-132-7.
- Macpherson, Ken; Barrie, Ron (2002). The Ships of Canada's Naval Forces 1910–2002 (Third ed.). St. Catharines, Ontario: Vanwell Publishing. ISBN 1-55125-072-1.
- Moore, John, ed. (1981). Jane's Fighting Ships, 1981–1982. New York: Jane's Information Group. ISBN 0-531-03977-3.
