= HMCS Quinte (MCB 149) =

History

Canada
- Name: Quinte
- Namesake: Bay of Quinte
- Builder: Port Arthur Shipbuilding Co., Port Arthur
- Laid down: 14 June 1952
- Launched: 8 August 1953
- Commissioned: 15 October 1954
- Decommissioned: 26 February 1964
- Identification: MCB 149
- Honours and awards: Atlantic 1941–42
- Badge: Vert, a Tudor rose, barbed and seeded or, upon a pentagonal cross pattee the arms being formed by five letters "E" each letter facing and converging towards the fess point argent

General characteristics
- Class & type: Bay-class minesweeper
- Displacement: 390 long tons (400 t); 412 long tons (419 t) (deep load)
- Length: 152 ft (46 m)
- Beam: 28 ft (8.5 m)
- Draught: 8 ft (2.4 m)
- Propulsion: 2 shafts, 2 GM 12-cylinder diesels, 2,400 bhp (1,800 kW)
- Speed: 16 knots (30 km/h; 18 mph)
- Range: 3,290 nmi (6,090 km; 3,790 mi) at 12 kn (22 km/h; 14 mph)
- Complement: 38
- Armament: 1 × 40 mm Bofors gun

HMCS Quinte (hull number MCB 149) was a Bay-class minesweeper that served in the Royal Canadian Navy during the Cold War. Entering service in 1954, the minesweeper was the second ship to bear the name. The ship was taken out of service in 1964 and declared surplus in 1965.

== Design and description ==
The Bay class were designed and ordered as replacements for the Second World War-era minesweepers that the Royal Canadian Navy operated at the time. Similar to the Ton-class minesweeper, they were constructed of wood planking and aluminum framing.

Displacing 390 long tons (400 t) standard at 412 long tons (419 t) at deep load, the minesweepers were 152 ft (46 m) long with a beam of 28 ft (8.5 m) and a draught of 8 ft (2.4 m). They had a complement of 38 officers and ratings. (Note: Gardiner and Chumbley claim the complement was 40.)

The Bay-class minesweepers were powered by two GM 12-cylinder diesel engines driving two shafts creating 2,400 brake horsepower (1,800 kW). This gave the ships a maximum speed of 16 knots (30 km/h; 18 mph) and a range of 3,290 nautical miles (6,090 km; 3,790 mi) at 12 knots (22 km/h; 14 mph). The ships were armed with one 40 mm Bofors gun and were equipped with minesweeping gear.

== Operational history ==
The ship's keel was laid down on 14 June 1952 by Port Arthur Shipbuilding at their yard in Port Arthur, Ontario. Named for a bay in Ontario, Quinte was launched on 8 August 1953. The ship was commissioned on 15 October 1954.

The First Canadian Minesweeping Squadron, of which Quinte was assigned, sailed to the Caribbean Sea in April 1955 for a training cruise, making several port visits. Quinte and three other ships of the Bay class comprised the First Minesweeping Squadron in 1960. In October 1960, Quinte was among the minesweepers that took part in the NATO naval exercise Sweep Clear V off Shelburne, Nova Scotia. The vessel remained in service until paid off on 26 February 1964. The minesweeper was declared surplus in 1965.
