= HMCS Provider (AOR 508) =

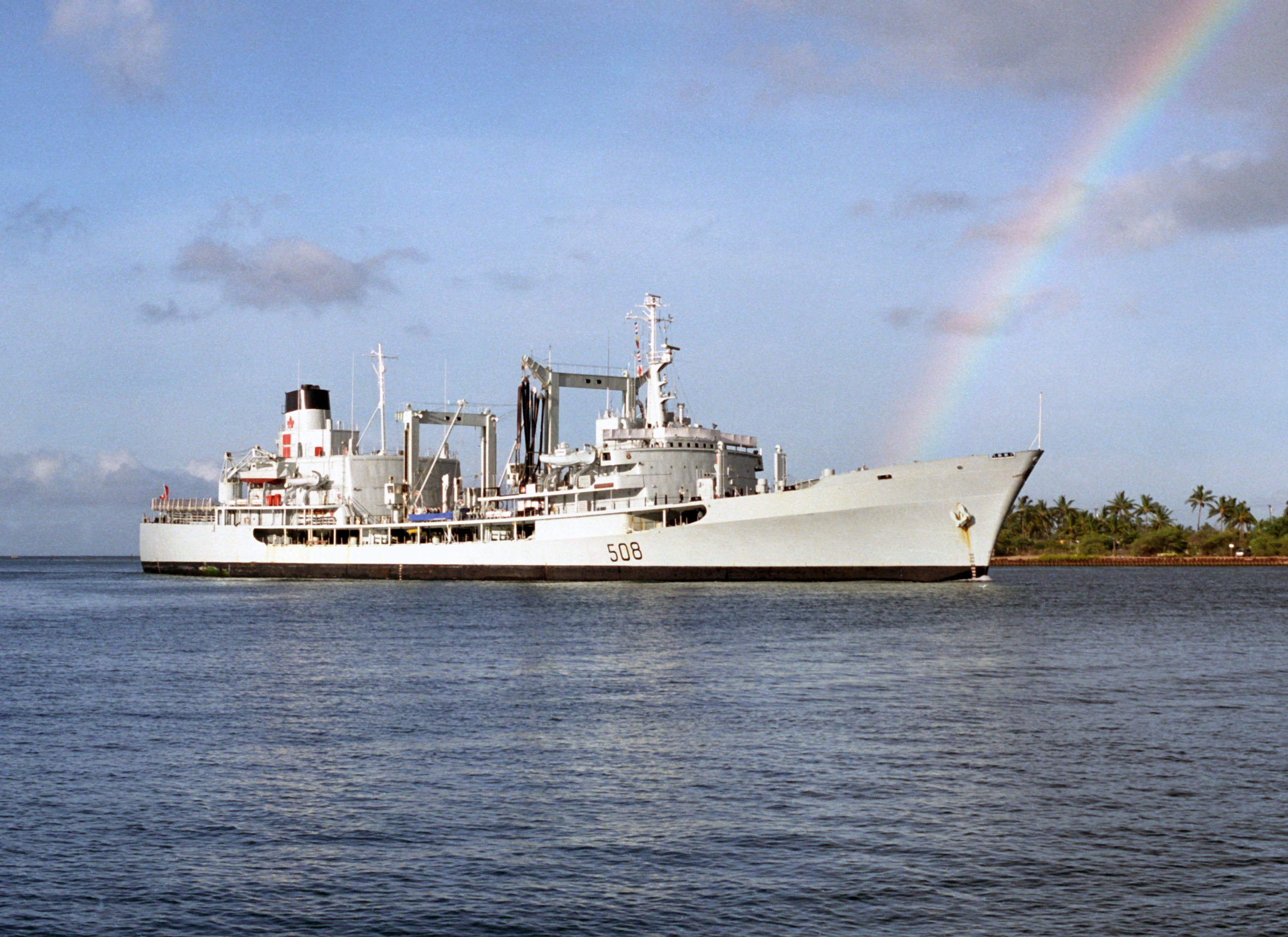
- HMCS Provider at Pearl Harbor for RIMPAC 86

Class overview
- Name: Provider class
- Operators: Royal Canadian Navy
- Preceded by: Dun-class tanker
- Succeeded by: Protecteur-class replenishment oiler
- In commission: 1963–1998
- Planned: 1
- Completed: 1
- Scrapped: 1

History

Canada
- Name: Provider
- Ordered: 15 April 1958
- Builder: Davie Shipbuilding, Lauzon
- Laid down: 21 June 1961
- Launched: 5 July 1962
- Commissioned: 28 September 1963
- Decommissioned: 24 June 1998
- Home port: CFB Halifax (1963–1969); CFB Esquimalt (1969–1996); CFB Halifax (1996–1998)
- Identification: IMO number: 5286192
- Motto: Ready to Serve
- Fate: Scrapped in Turkey in 2003
- Badge: Azure, an ancient Greek amphora garnished around the base of the neck with maple leaves, and on the main body of the vessel, a foul anchor erect all of gold.

General characteristics
- Class & type: Replenishment oiler
- Displacement: 7,300 long tons (7,400 t) light; 22,000 long tons (22,000 t) full
- Length: 168 m (551 ft 2 in)
- Beam: 23.2 m (76 ft 1 in)
- Draught: 9.1 m (29 ft 10 in)
- Propulsion: Double reduction geared turbines; 2 water boilers; single shaft; 21,000 shp (16,000 kW)
- Speed: 20 knots (37 km/h; 23 mph)
- Complement: 142 (11 officers, 131 enlisted) – 166
- Armament: Helicopter-launched Mark 46 Mod 5 torpedoes
- Aircraft carried: 2 × Sikorsky CH-124A Sea King helicopters
- Aviation facilities: Aft deck hangar and flight deck

HMCS Provider was a replenishment oiler and sole ship of her class of first the Royal Canadian Navy and later the Canadian Forces. She was the first dedicated auxiliary oiler replenishment ship commissioned for the Royal Canadian Navy in 1963, and the largest ship built in Canada to that date. Originally assigned to the East Coast, her open deck made her vulnerable and she was reassigned to the West coast. The ship was paid off in 1998, sold for scrap and broken up in Turkey in 2003.

== Design and description ==
Designed as an adaption of the United States Maritime Administration's Paul Revere or Mariner-class attack transport, Provider was 168 metres (551 ft) long with a beam of 23 metres (76 ft), a draught of 9.1 metres (30 ft) and displaced 22,700 long tons (23,100 t) fully loaded. The ship had a 20,000 GRT and a 14,700 DWT. The design used standard commercial shipbuilding practices according to Lloyd's rules. However, the design was widened aft to accommodate possible future use of nuclear propulsion. This alteration led to vibration issues, which required further structural changes.

Provider was powered by a Westinghouse double reduction geared turbine engine creating 16,000 kilowatts (21,000 shp). The two water-tube boilers could be controlled automatically during a nuclear attack. The ship was also provided with an emergency 40 kW (54 hp) Rover gas turbine engine, the first gas turbine engine installed in a Canadian naval vessel. This gave the ship a maximum speed of 20 knots (37 km/h; 23 mph). The ship had a complement of 11 officers and 131 ratings.

As a replenishment ship, Provider had stowage space for 12,000 tonnes (12,000 long tons; 13,000 short tons) of fuel oil, diesel oil and aviation gas along with naval supplies. The hoses and wire system that the Canadians had designed for Provider's replenishment at sea operations became standard for all NATO replenishment oilers. Provider was considered a prototype for the Protecteur-class replenishment oiler.

The ship had special accommodation for flag officers and an eight-berth hospital. Provider had a flight deck installed aft along with a hangar located below the funnel on the same deck as the flight deck. The vessel could carry up to six CH-124 Sea Kings.

== Construction and career ==
First authorized on 15 April 1958, Provider was laid down by Davie Shipbuilding and Repairing Company Limited of Lauzon, Quebec on 21 June 1961. She was launched on 5 July 1962 and was commissioned by the Royal Canadian Navy on 28 September 1963 at Saint John, New Brunswick. The vessel cost $15,700,000. (Note: Adjusted for inflation to 2026 dollars, $160,120,497.) The vessel was homeported at CFB Halifax.

Provider was stationed in the Mediterranean Sea, along with two destroyers, in May 1967 to help support Canadian troops who were part of the United Nations Emergency Force in Gaza. The vessel's homeport was transferred to CFB Esquimalt on the west coast in 1969 following the arrival of the Protecteur-class ships. Along with Mackenzie and Yukon, Provider attended Canada Week at Expo '70 in Osaka, Japan.

A refit was completed on Provider at Burrard Dry Dock in 1982. Another refit was scheduled for Provider in 1987 to accommodate the desegregation of the Navy. Nineteen women joined a crew of then 210 on board Provider in 1987 after her refit.

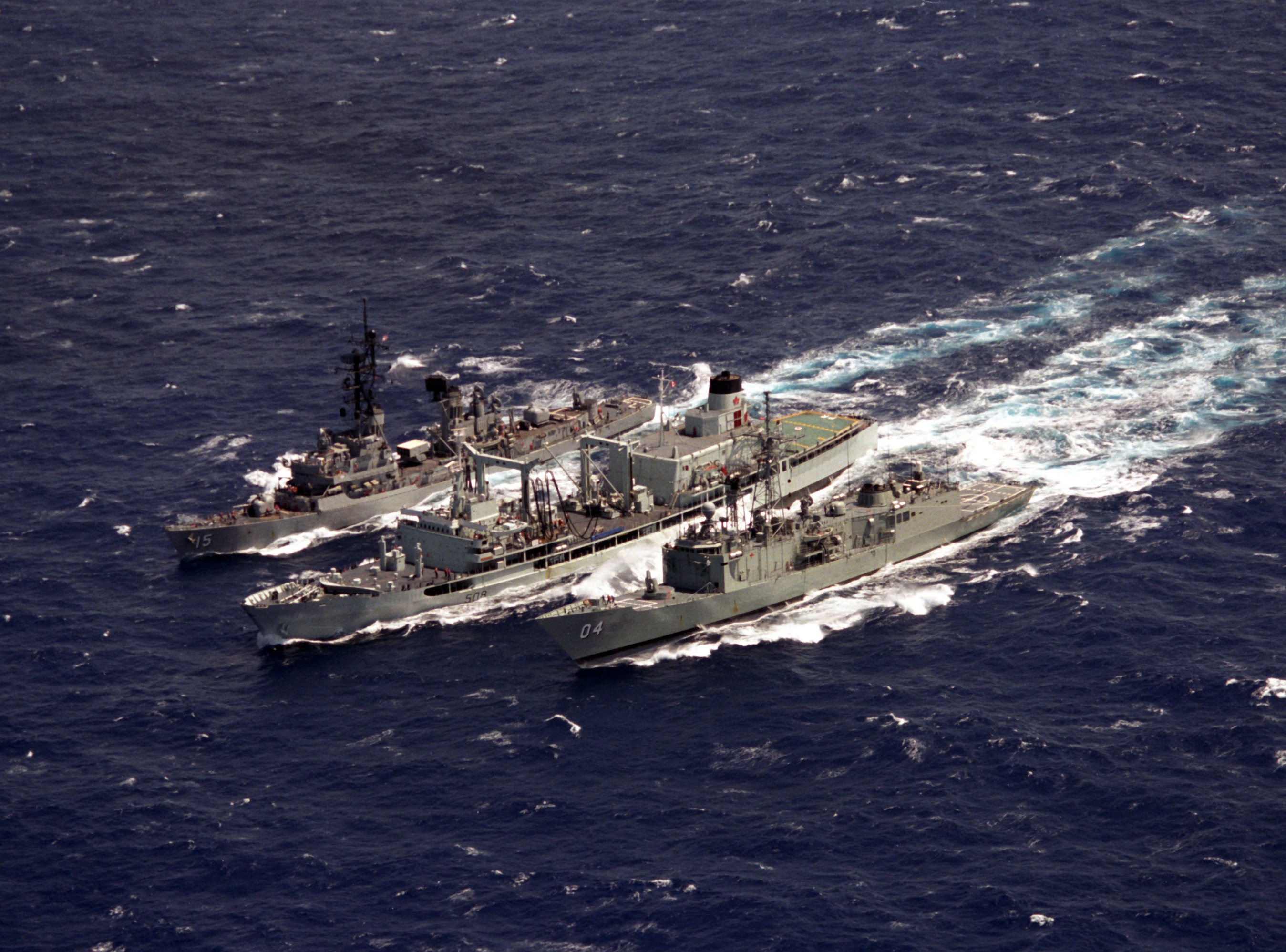
Provider refueling HMAS Darwin (left) and USS Berkeley (right) in 1986

Provider, along with Huron, Annapolis, and Kootenay, were the first Western warships to visit the former Soviet base of Vladivostok since 1937. Over four days in June 1990, over 30,000 Russians toured the four ships, and their crews were welcomed into the town with open arms. Over 50,000 lapel pins, stickers, and flags were given by the crews of the Canadian ships, as well as showing the locals what a screwdriver was. After leaving Vladivostok, Provider rescued 88 Vietnamese who were adrift in the South China Sea before making a port call in Manila.

Provider escorted Huron to the Panama Canal in January 1991. Huron was on her way to CFB Halifax for refitting before heading into the Gulf War. Had the Gulf War continued, Provider and Restigouche would have either joined or relieved other Canadian ships in the war zone.

Relieving ships from CFB Halifax, Provider joined the United Nations embargo against Haiti in late 1993. In 1996, the home port of Provider was once again changed back to CFB Halifax.

The ship was paid off on 24 June 1998, two years later than originally planned, and remained in Halifax Harbour until 2002 while she awaited auction. Provider was sold for scrap and arrived in Aliağa, Turkey to be broken up on 28 August 2002.
