= CNAV Endeavour =

Canadian naval military research ship

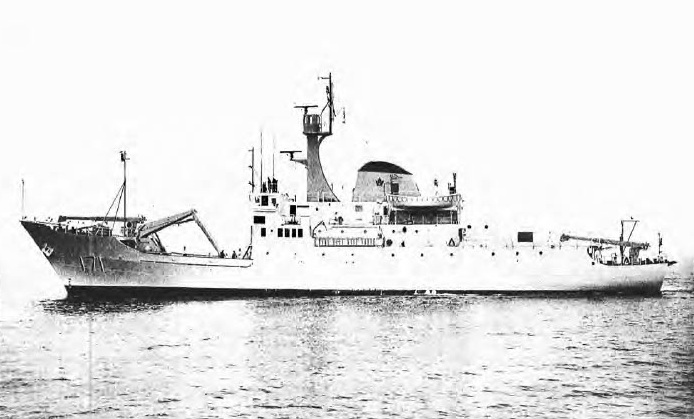
- CNAV Endeavour in 1964–1965

History

Canada
- Name: Endeavour
- Builder: Yarrows, Esquimalt
- Laid down: 4 September 1963
- Launched: 4 September 1964
- Commissioned: 9 March 1965
- Decommissioned: 2000
- Identification: AGOR 171

General characteristics
- Type: Oceanographic research ship
- Displacement: 1,560 long tons (1,585 t) full load
- Length: 236 ft 0 in (71.9 m)
- Beam: 38 ft 6 in (11.7 m)
- Draught: 13 ft 0 in (4.0 m)
- Propulsion: Diesel-electric, 2 shafts, 2,960 shp (2,207 kW)
- Speed: 16 knots (30 km/h)
- Range: 10,000 nmi (19,000 km) at 12 kn (22 km/h)
- Complement: 50
- Aviation facilities: 48 ft × 31 ft (14.6 m × 9.4 m) helicopter deck

CNAV Endeavour (later CFAV Endeavour, after the 1968 unification of the Canadian Armed Forces) was an Endeavour-class research ship. The vessel served the Royal Canadian Navy and later the Canadian Forces from 1965 to 1999. Endeavour performed research in oceanography and anti-submarine warfare, primarily on the West Coast of Canada.

== Description ==
Endeavour had a displacement of 1,560 long tons (1,585 t) at full load with a length overall of 236 feet 0 inches (71.9 m), a beam of 38 feet 6 inches (11.7 m) and a draught of 13 feet 0 inches (4.0 m). Endeavour's hull was stiffened for work in areas with ice.

The ship was propelled by two shafts driven by a diesel-electric engine creating 2,960 shaft horsepower (2,207 kW). The machinery space was insulated to reduce noise. This gave the vessel a maximum speed of 16 knots (30 km/h) and a range of 10,000 nautical miles (19,000 km) at 12 knots (22 km/h). Endeavour could turn 2 1/2 times its length. The ship had a 48-by-31-foot (14.6 m × 9.4 m) helicopter deck. The ship was fitted with two 9-ton Austin-Weston telescopic cranes. Two oceanographical winches, each holding 5,000 fathoms (9,100 m) of wire, two bathythermograph winches and one deep-sea coring winch were also fitted. The vessel had a complement of 50, which included 10 officers, 13 scientists and two aircrew.

== Service history ==
Endeavour was ordered from Yarrows Ltd. and constructed at their shipyard in Esquimalt, British Columbia and given the yard number 250. Endeavour's keel was laid down on 4 September 1963 and the ship was launched on 4 September 1964. The vessel was commissioned into the Royal Canadian Navy on 9 March 1965 and given the hull number AGOR 171. Endeavour was deployed on the West Coast of Canada researching anti-submarine warfare from the time the ship entered service until 1999. The vessel replaced the old Bangor-class minesweeper Oshawa. In 1999, Endeavour was transferred to the East Coast to replace Quest temporarily, while Quest was undergoing modernisation. In 2000, Endeavour was discarded.

== Sources ==
- Maginley, Charles D. & Collin, Bernard (2001). The Ships of Canada's Marine Services. St. Catharines, Ontario: Vanwell Publishing Limited. ISBN 1-55125-070-5.}
- "Endeavour (6422511)". Miramar Ship Index.
- Moore, John, ed. (1981). Jane's Fighting Ships 1981–82. New York: Jane's Publishing Incorporated. ISBN 0-531-03977-3.
