= HMCS Chignecto (MCB 160) =

Canadian minesweeping vessel (1957-1998)

History

Canada
- Name: Chignecto
- Namesake: Chignecto Bay
- Builder: Davie Shipbuilding, Lauzon
- Laid down: 25 October 1955
- Launched: 17 November 1956
- Commissioned: 1 August 1957
- Decommissioned: 19 December 1998
- Identification: MCB 160
- Fate: Broken up 1999
- Badge: Gules, a pile azure fimbriated argent charged with a sprig of bulrush or.

General characteristics
- Class & type: Bay-class minesweeper
- Displacement: 390 long tons (400 t); 412 long tons (419 t) (deep load)
- Length: 152 ft (46 m)
- Beam: 28 ft (8.5 m)
- Draught: 8 ft (2.4 m)
- Propulsion: 2 shafts, 2 GM 12-cylinder diesels, 2,400 bhp (1,800 kW)
- Speed: 16 knots (30 km/h; 18 mph)
- Range: 3,290 nmi (6,090 km; 3,790 mi) at 12 kn (22 km/h; 14 mph)
- Complement: 38
- Armament: 1 × 40 mm Bofors gun

HMCS Chignecto (hull number MCB 160) was a Bay-class minesweeper that served in the Royal Canadian Navy during the Cold War. Entering service in 1957, the minesweeper was used primarily as a training vessel on the Pacific coast of Canada. Discarded in 1998, the ship was broken up in 1999.

== Design and description ==
The Bay class were designed and ordered as replacements for the Second World War-era minesweepers that the Royal Canadian Navy operated at the time. Similar to the Ton-class minesweeper, they were constructed of wood planking and aluminum framing.

Displacing 390 long tons (400 t) standard at 412 long tons (419 t) at deep load, the minesweepers were 152 ft (46 m) long with a beam of 28 ft (8.5 m) and a draught of 8 ft (2.4 m). They had a complement of 38 officers and ratings. (Note: Gardiner and Chumbley claim the complement was 40.)

The Bay-class minesweepers were powered by two GM 12-cylinder diesel engines driving two shafts creating 2,400 brake horsepower (1,800 kW). This gave the ships a maximum speed of 16 knots (30 km/h; 18 mph) and a range of 3,290 nautical miles (6,090 km; 3,790 mi) at 12 knots (22 km/h; 14 mph). The ships were armed with one 40 mm Bofors gun and were equipped with minesweeping gear.

== Operational history ==
Ordered as a replacement for sister ship, Chignecto (MCB 156) which had been transferred to the French Navy in 1954, the ship's keel was laid down on 25 October 1955 by George T. Davie & Sons Ltd. at their yard in Lauzon, Quebec. Named for a bay located between Nova Scotia and New Brunswick, Chignecto was launched on 17 November 1956. The ship was commissioned on 1 August 1957.

After commissioning, the minesweeper was transferred to the West Coast of Canada and joined Training Group Pacific. In 1972, the class was re-designated patrol escorts. The vessel remained a part of the unit until being paid off on 19 December 1998. Chignecto was sold to Budget Steel of Victoria, British Columbia in May 1999 and broken up for scrap.
