= HMCS Fundy (MCB 159) =

History

Canada
- Name: Fundy
- Namesake: Bay of Fundy
- Builder: Davie Shipbuilding, Lauzon
- Laid down: 7 March 1955
- Launched: 14 June 1956
- Commissioned: 27 November 1956
- Decommissioned: 19 December 1996
- Identification: MCB 159
- Motto: Verimus altum; ("We sweep the deep")
- Honours and awards: Atlantic 1939–45
- Fate: Paid off, fate unknown
- Badge: Gules, a pile azure, fimbriated argent charged with a maple leaf between two fleurs-de-lis, all conjoined on the one stem, or

General characteristics
- Class & type: Bay-class minesweeper
- Displacement: 390 long tons (400 t); 412 long tons (419 t) (deep load)
- Length: 152 ft (46 m)
- Beam: 28 ft (8.5 m)
- Draught: 8 ft (2.4 m)
- Propulsion: 2 shafts, 2 GM 12-cylinder diesels, 2,400 bhp (1,800 kW)
- Speed: 16 knots (30 km/h; 18 mph)
- Range: 3,290 nmi (6,090 km; 3,790 mi) at 12 kn (22 km/h; 14 mph)
- Complement: 38
- Armament: 1 × 40 mm Bofors gun

HMCS Fundy (hull number MCB 159) was a Bay-class minesweeper that was constructed for the Royal Canadian Navy during the Cold War. Entering service in 1956, the vessel was used as a training ship on the West Coast of Canada for the majority of her career. Fundy was decommissioned in 1996 and the fate of the vessel is unknown.

== Design and description ==
The Bay class were designed and ordered as replacements for the Second World War-era minesweepers that the Royal Canadian Navy operated at the time. Similar to the Ton-class minesweeper, they were constructed of wood planking and aluminum framing.

Displacing 390 long tons (400 t) standard at 412 long tons (419 t) at deep load, the minesweepers were 152 ft (46 m) long with a beam of 28 ft (8.5 m) and a draught of 8 ft (2.4 m). They had a complement of 38 officers and ratings. (Note: Gardiner and Chumbley claim the complement was 40.)

The Bay-class minesweepers were powered by two GM 12-cylinder diesel engines driving two shafts creating 2,400 brake horsepower (1,800 kW). This gave the ships a maximum speed of 16 knots (30 km/h; 18 mph) and a range of 3,290 nautical miles (6,090 km; 3,790 mi) at 12 knots (22 km/h; 14 mph). The ships were armed with one 40 mm Bofors gun and were equipped with minesweeping gear.

== Operational history ==
Ordered as a replacement for sister ship, Fundy (MCB 145) which had been transferred to the French Navy in 1954, the ship's keel was laid down on 7 March 1955 by Davie Shipbuilding at their yard in Lauzon, Quebec. Named for a bay located between New Brunswick and Nova Scotia, Fundy was launched on 14 June 1956. The ship was commissioned on 27 November 1956.

After commissioning, the minesweeper was transferred to the West Coast of Canada and joined Training Group Pacific. In 1972, the class was re-designated patrol escorts. The vessel remained a part of the unit until being paid off on 19 December 1996. The ultimate fate of the ship is unknown.

== Notes ==
=== References ===
- Arbuckle, J. Graeme (1987). Badges of the Canadian Navy. Halifax, Nova Scotia: Nimbus Publishing. ISBN 0-920852-49-1.
- Colledge, J. J.; Warlow, Ben (2006) [1969]. Ships of the Royal Navy: The Complete Record of All Fighting Ships of the Royal Navy from the 15th Century to the Present (3rd Rev ed.). London: Chatham Publishing. ISBN 978-1-86176-281-8. OCLC 67375475.
- Gardiner, Robert; Chumbley, Stephen; Budzbon, Przemysław, eds. (1995). Conway's All the World's Fighting Ships 1947–1995. Annapolis, Maryland: Naval Institute Press. ISBN 1-55750-132-7.
- Macpherson, Ken; Barrie, Ron (2002). The Ships of Canada's Naval Forces 1910–2002 (Third ed.). St. Catharines, Ontario: Vanwell Publishing. ISBN 1-55125-072-1.
- Moore, John, ed. (1981). Jane's Fighting Ships, 1981–1982. New York: Jane's Information Group. ISBN 0-531-03977-3.
