= HMCS Resolute =

Bay-class minesweeper of the Royal Canadian Navy

History

Canada
- Name: Resolute
- Namesake: Resolute Bay
- Builder: Kingston Shipbuilding, Kingston
- Laid down: 29 August 1951
- Launched: 20 June 1953
- Commissioned: 16 September 1954
- Decommissioned: 14 February 1964
- Identification: MCB 154
- Fate: Discarded 1965
- Badge: Gules, a pile barry wavy of ten argent and azure, charged with a warrior in tilting armour mounted on a sea-horse sable, trappings gules, and holding with the dexter hand a lance at the rest from which flies a pennant argent bearing a maple leaf gules

General characteristics
- Class & type: Bay-class minesweeper
- Displacement: 390 long tons (400 t); 412 long tons (419 t) (deep load)
- Length: 152 ft (46 m)
- Beam: 28 ft (8.5 m)
- Draught: 8 ft (2.4 m)
- Propulsion: 2 shafts, 2 GM 12-cylinder diesels, 2,400 bhp (1,800 kW)
- Speed: 16 knots (30 km/h; 18 mph)
- Range: 3,290 nmi (6,090 km; 3,790 mi) at 12 kn (22 km/h; 14 mph)
- Complement: 38
- Armament: 1 × 40 mm Bofors gun

HMCS Resolute (hull number MCB 154) was a Bay-class minesweeper that was constructed for the Royal Canadian Navy during the Cold War. Entering service in 1954, the ship served on the East Coast of Canada until 1964 when Resolute was decommissioned. The vessel was discarded in 1965.

== Design and description ==
The Bay class were designed and ordered as replacements for the Second World War-era minesweepers that the Royal Canadian Navy operated at the time. Similar to the Ton-class minesweeper, they were constructed of wood planking and aluminum framing.

Displacing 390 long tons (400 t) standard at 412 long tons (419 t) at deep load, the minesweepers were 152 ft (46 m) long with a beam of 28 ft (8.5 m) and a draught of 8 ft (2.4 m). They had a complement of 38 officers and ratings. (Note: Gardiner and Chumbley claim the complement was 40.)

The Bay-class minesweepers were powered by two GM 12-cylinder diesel engines driving two shafts creating 2,400 brake horsepower (1,800 kW). This gave the ships a maximum speed of 16 knots (30 km/h; 18 mph) and a range of 3,290 nautical miles (6,090 km; 3,790 mi) at 12 knots (22 km/h; 14 mph). The ships were armed with one 40 mm Bofors gun and were equipped with minesweeping gear.

== Operational history ==
The ship's keel was laid down on 29 August 1951 by Kingston Shipbuilding at their yard in Kingston, Ontario. Named for a bay located in Nunavut, Resolute was launched on 20 June 1953. The ship was commissioned on 16 September 1954.

Upon commissioning, Resolute joined the First Canadian Minesweeping Squadron. In May 1956, the First Canadian Minesweeping Squadron deployed as part of the NATO minesweeping exercise Minex Sweep Clear One in the western Atlantic. The ship paid off on 14 February 1964. In 1965, Resolute was declared surplus.

== Notes ==
=== References ===
- Arbuckle, J. Graeme (1987). Badges of the Canadian Navy. Halifax, Nova Scotia: Nimbus Publishing. ISBN 0-920852-49-1.
- Colledge, J. J.; Warlow, Ben (2006) [1969]. Ships of the Royal Navy: The Complete Record of All Fighting Ships of the Royal Navy from the 15th Century to the Present (3rd Rev ed.). London: Chatham Publishing. ISBN 978-1-86176-281-8. OCLC 67375475.
- Gardiner, Robert; Chumbley, Stephen; Budzbon, Przemysław, eds. (1995). Conway's All the World's Fighting Ships 1947–1995. Annapolis, Maryland: Naval Institute Press. ISBN 1-55750-132-7.
- Macpherson, Ken; Barrie, Ron (2002). The Ships of Canada's Naval Forces 1910–2002 (Third ed.). St. Catharines, Ontario: Vanwell Publishing. ISBN 1-55125-072-1.
- Moore, John, ed. (1981). Jane's Fighting Ships, 1981–1982. New York: Jane's Information Group. ISBN 0-531-03977-3.
