= HMCS Gaspé (MCB 143) =

History

Canada
- Name: Gaspé
- Namesake: Gaspé Bay
- Builder: Davie Shipbuilding, Lauzon
- Laid down: 21 March 1951
- Launched: 12 November 1951
- Commissioned: 26 November 1953
- Decommissioned: 22 August 1957
- Identification: MCB 143
- Honours and awards: Atlantic 1939–45
- Fate: Sold in 1957 to Turkey as Trabzon.
- Badge: On a field barry wavy of ten argent and azure, a pile gules, proceeding from the dexter side, upon which a mullet argent pointing to the dexter chief, with "commas" of the same issuing from the points of the mullet, and between them a fleur-de-lis, or

Turkey
- Name: Trabzon
- Acquired: 31 March 1958
- Commissioned: 19 May 1958
- Out of service: 1991
- Identification: M 530

General characteristics
- Class & type: Bay-class minesweeper
- Displacement: 390 long tons (400 t); 412 long tons (419 t) (deep load)
- Length: 152 ft (46 m)
- Beam: 28 ft (8.5 m)
- Draught: 8 ft (2.4 m)
- Propulsion: 2 shafts, 2 GM 12-cylinder diesels, 2,400 bhp (1,800 kW)
- Speed: 16 knots (30 km/h; 18 mph)
- Range: 3,290 nmi (6,090 km; 3,790 mi) at 12 kn (22 km/h; 14 mph)
- Complement: 38
- Armament: 1 × 40 mm Bofors gun

HMCS Gaspé (hull number MCB 143) was a Bay-class minesweeper that was constructed for the Royal Canadian Navy during the Cold War. The vessel entered service in 1953 and remained with the Royal Canadian Navy until 1958. That year, the ship was transferred to the Turkish Navy and renamed Trabzon. The vessel remained in service until 1991.

== Design and description ==
The Bay class were designed and ordered as replacements for the Second World War-era minesweepers that the Royal Canadian Navy operated at the time. Similar to the Ton-class minesweeper, they were constructed of wood planking and aluminum framing.

Displacing 390 long tons (400 t) standard at 412 long tons (419 t) at deep load, the minesweepers were 152 ft (46 m) long with a beam of 28 ft (8.5 m) and a draught of 8 ft (2.4 m). They had a complement of 38 officers and ratings. (Note: Gardiner and Chumbley claim the complement was 40.)

The Bay-class minesweepers were powered by two GM 12-cylinder diesel engines driving two shafts creating 2,400 brake horsepower (1,800 kW). This gave the ships a maximum speed of 16 knots (30 km/h; 18 mph) and a range of 3,290 nautical miles (6,090 km; 3,790 mi) at 12 knots (22 km/h; 14 mph). The ships were armed with one 40 mm Bofors gun and were equipped with minesweeping gear.

== Operational history ==
The ship's keel was laid down on 21 March 1951 by Davie Shipbuilding at their yard in Lauzon, Quebec. Named for a bay located in Quebec, Gaspé was launched on 12 November 1951. The ship was commissioned on 26 November 1953. The First Canadian Minesweeping Squadron was constituted in December 1953 with Gaspé an initial unit. The squadron sailed to the Caribbean Sea in April 1955 for a training cruise, making several port visits. In May 1956, the First Canadian Minesweeping Squadron deployed as part of the NATO minesweeping exercise Minex Sweep Clear One in the western Atlantic.

The ship remained in service with the Royal Canadian Navy until being paid off on 22 August 1957. The ship was transferred to the Turkish Navy as part of the NATO Mutual Aid Agreement on 31 March 1958. Commissioned into the Turkish Navy on 19 May 1958 and renamed Trabzon, the ship remained in service until 1991.

== Notes ==
=== References ===
- Arbuckle, J. Graeme (1987). Badges of the Canadian Navy. Halifax, Nova Scotia: Nimbus Publishing. ISBN 0-920852-49-1.
- Colledge, J. J.; Warlow, Ben (2006) [1969]. Ships of the Royal Navy: The Complete Record of All Fighting Ships of the Royal Navy from the 15th Century to the Present (3rd Rev ed.). London: Chatham Publishing. ISBN 978-1-86176-281-8. OCLC 67375475.
- Gardiner, Robert; Chumbley, Stephen; Budzbon, Przemysław, eds. (1995). Conway's All the World's Fighting Ships 1947–1995. Annapolis, Maryland: Naval Institute Press. ISBN 1-55750-132-7.
- Macpherson, Ken; Barrie, Ron (2002). The Ships of Canada's Naval Forces 1910–2002 (Third ed.). St. Catharines, Ontario: Vanwell Publishing. ISBN 1-55125-072-1.
- Milner, Marc (2010). Canada's Navy: The First Century (Second ed.). Toronto: University of Toronto Press. ISBN 978-0-8020-9604-3.
- Moore, John, ed. (1981). Jane's Fighting Ships, 1981–1982. New York: Jane's Information Group. ISBN 0-531-03977-3.
