= CNAV Laymore =

Canada
- Name: Laymore
- Ordered: 1944
- Commissioned: 12 June 1945
- Decommissioned: 17 April 1946
- Fate: Sold 1977
- Notes: Became CNAV in 1946
- Name: Chilcotin Princess
- Acquired: 1977
- In service: 1977
- Out of service: 1999
- Identification: IMO number: 8137005
- Status: Laid up at Namu, British Columbia

General characteristics as built
- Type: Design 381 freighter
- Tonnage: 560 GRT; 262 NT
- Displacement: 803 long tons (816 t)
- Length: 53.9 m (176 ft 10 in) oa; 50.7 m (166 ft 4 in) pp
- Beam: 9.8 m (32 ft 2 in)
- Draught: 2.7 m (9 ft 0 in)
- Installed power: 1,000 bhp (746 kW)
- Propulsion: GM diesel engines
- Speed: 10.8 knots (20.0 km/h; 12.4 mph)
- Armament: 1 × 4 in (102 mm) gun; 2 × 20 mm (0.79 in) cannon

CNAV Laymore was an auxiliary vessel of the Royal Canadian Navy and the Canadian Forces during World War II and the Cold War, converted to an oceanographic research vessel in 1966. The vessel was commissioned in 1945 as HMCS Laymore and served on the east coast of Canada. In 1946, the vessel was paid off and redesignated a naval auxiliary, given the prefix "CNAV" and transferred to the west coast. Laymore was taken out of service in 1977 and sold to private interests. Renamed Chilcotin Princess, the ship was used as a small coastal cargo vessel servicing smaller ports along the British Columbia Coast. In 1998, Chilcotin Princess was sold for use as a helicopter pad by the logging industry in British Columbia. The vessel was then brought to Namu, British Columbia, where Chilcotin Princess was left unattended.

== Description ==
As built Laymore was 53.9 m (176 ft 10 in) long overall, 50.7 m (166 ft 4 in) between perpendiculars, with a beam of 9.8 m (32 ft 2 in) and a draught of 2.7 m (9 ft 0 in). The ship had a displacement of 803 long tons (816 t), a gross register tonnage (GRT) of 560 tons and a net tonnage (NT) of 262 tons. The vessel was powered by General Motors diesel engines driving two screws rated at 1,000 brake horsepower (750 kW). The ship had a maximum speed of 10.8 knots (20.0 km/h; 12.4 mph). During World War II, Laymore was armed with one 4-inch (102 mm) naval gun and two 20 mm (0.79 in) cannon.

== Service history ==
The origin of Laymore is disputed by the sources. Macpherson & Barrie claim the ship was constructed at Kewaunee, Wisconsin while the Miramar Ship Index is unsure as to which ship Laymore was laid down as, believing it could possibly be FS-375 constructed by Sturgeon Bay Shipbuilding and Drydock Company at their yard in Sturgeon Bay, Wisconsin for the United States Army. The ship was transferred to the Royal Canadian Navy during World War II and was commissioned as HMCS Laymore on 12 June 1945. Laymore was stationed on the east coast of Canada and operated in a variety of roles including transporting goods, boom defence and the laying of moorings.

The ship was paid off on 17 April 1946 after the end of the war and transferred to the west coast of Canada in mid-1946. The vessel reentered service as a naval auxiliary and was given the new prefix "CNAV". The conversion to an oceanographic research vessel began on 2 August 1965, with Laymore re-entering service in March 1966 and reclassified with the hull symbol AGOR. In 1977, Laymore was taken out of service and put up for sale. The vessel was purchased by Coast Ferries of Vancouver on 29 March 1977 and converted to a small cargo ship. Renamed Chilcotin Princess, the ship was used to transport cargo and passengers between points on the northern end of Vancouver Island and places around Bella Bella and Bella Coola. Chilcotin Princess was used to transport frozen fish shipments from Namu, British Columbia. In 1987, the vessel underwent minor reconstruction, receiving a new superstructure that could accommodate twelve passengers in six deluxe staterooms, and included a dining room, three lounges and an open sunbridge. In 1998, Chilcotin Princess was sold to the logging industry for use as a helicopter pad. Chilcotin Princess' registry was deleted in 1999 and the vessel was taken to Namu and laid up. The vessel became derelict and on the verge of sinking. The Canadian Coast Guard removed 25,000 litres (5,500 imp gal; 6,600 US gal) of oily water from the vessel, later suing the owner of the vessel for costs incurred.

== Sources ==
- Blackman, Raymond V. B., ed. (1953). Jane's Fighting Ships 1953–54. London: Sampson, Low and Marston. OCLC 913556389.
- Centre for Transportation Studies (1978), Transportation Needs and Availability in the Northern Coastal Communities of British Columbia, Vancouver, British Columbia: University of British Columbia, OCLC 71383151
- "Chilcotin Princess (2015)". Ship-source Oil Pollution Fund. Government of Canada.
- Ford, Ken (1987), Ford's Freighter Travel Guide, vol. 69–71, Northridge, California: Ford's Travel Guides, ISBN 0-916486-45-1
- Hume, Mark (12 March 2015). "B.C. orders clean-up of decaying and abandoned cannery at Namu". The Globe and Mail.
- Macpherson, Ken & Barrie, Ron (2002). The Ships of Canada's Naval Forces 1910–2002 (Third ed.). St. Catharines, Ontario: Vanwell Publishing. ISBN 1-55125-072-1.
- "Section 1". Marine Digest. Vol. 56, no. 1–23. Seattle, Washington. 1977. ISSN 1542-5568.
- "Laymore (8137005)". Miramar Ship Index.
- Moore, John, ed. (1974). Jane's Fighting Ships 1974–75. New York: Franklin Watts Incorporated. ISBN 0-531-02743-0.
- "Steamboat Bill". Journal of the Steamship Historical Society of America (226–228). West Barrington, Rhode Island: Steamship Historical Society of America. 1998. OCLC 702602732.
