= HMCS Chaleur (MCB 164) =

Minesweeper in the Royal Canadian Navy

History

Canada
- Name: Chaleur
- Namesake: Chaleur Bay
- Builder: Marine Industries, Sorel
- Laid down: 20 February 1956
- Launched: 11 May 1957
- Commissioned: 12 September 1957
- Decommissioned: 18 December 1998
- Identification: MCB 164
- Fate: Sank at moorings 2021; Undergoing removal and scrapping in July, 2025.
- Badge: A field pile or and gules above a barry wavy azure and argent, and in the center an equilateral triangle azure bearing a fern leaf or.

General characteristics
- Class & type: Bay-class minesweeper
- Displacement: 390 long tons (400 t); 412 long tons (419 t) (deep load)
- Length: 152 ft (46 m)
- Beam: 28 ft (8.5 m)
- Draught: 8 ft (2.4 m)
- Propulsion: 2 shafts, 2 GM 12-cylinder diesels, 2,400 bhp (1,800 kW)
- Speed: 16 knots (30 km/h; 18 mph)
- Range: 3,290 nmi (6,090 km; 3,790 mi) at 12 kn (22 km/h; 14 mph)
- Complement: 38
- Armament: 1 x 40 mm Bofors gun

HMCS Chaleur (hull number MCB 164) was a Bay-class minesweeper that served in the Royal Canadian Navy during the Cold War. Entering service in 1957, the minesweeper was used mainly as a training ship on the West Coast of Canada. The vessel was discarded in 1998 and sold for scrap in 1999. However, only partially dismantled, the ex-Chaleur was towed to California to have the process completed at a salvage yard. The salvage yard was found to be operating illegally and the demolition of the ship was postponed. Without preventative maintenance, the ship sank at her moorings in 2021.

== Design and description ==
The Bay class were designed and ordered as replacements for the Second World War-era minesweepers that the Royal Canadian Navy operated at the time. Similar to the Ton-class minesweeper, they were constructed of wood planking and aluminum framing.

Displacing 390 long tons (400 t) standard at 412 long tons (419 t) at deep load, the minesweepers were 152 ft (46 m) long with a beam of 28 ft (8.5 m) and a draught of 8 ft (2.4 m). They had a complement of 38 officers and ratings. (Note: Gardiner, Chumbley & Budzbon claim the complement was 40.)

The Bay-class minesweepers were powered by two GM 12-cylinder diesel engines driving two shafts creating 2,400 brake horsepower (1,800 kW). This gave the ships a maximum speed of 16 knots (30 km/h; 18 mph) and a range of 3,290 nautical miles (6,090 km; 3,790 mi) at 12 knots (22 km/h; 14 mph). The ships were armed with one 40 mm Bofors gun and were equipped with minesweeping gear.

== Operational history ==
Ordered as a replacement for sister ship, Chaleur (MCB 144) which had been transferred to the French Navy in 1954, the ship's keel was laid down on 20 February 1956 by Marine Industries at their yard in Sorel, Quebec. Named for a bay located between Quebec and New Brunswick, Chaleur was launched on 11 May 1957. The ship was commissioned on 12 September 1957.

After commissioning, the minesweeper was transferred to the West Coast of Canada and joined Training Group Pacific. In 1972, the class was re-designated patrol escorts. The vessel remained a part of the unit until being paid off on 18 December 1998. The ship was sold for scrap for breaking up at Port Hope, British Columbia in 1999. However, the hull was only gutted for parts and only sections were dismantled. The ex-Chaleur eventually ended up in the California Delta at the Herman and Helen's Marina outside Stockton, California. Initially the hull was only to stay at the marina for a week before being taken to a marine salvage yard within the bay for dismantling. However, the salvage yard was found to be operating illegally and shut down. The vessel was sold to a new owner and tied up alongside other derelict vessels at the marina. A legal quagmire developed around the marina and the derelict ships, preventing any work from being done. Eventually in 2021, the vessel sank. The refloating of the vessel and removal began in July 2025 at a cost of $8 million USD.

== Notes ==
=== References ===
- Arbuckle, J. Graeme (1987). Badges of the Canadian Navy. Halifax, Nova Scotia: Nimbus Publishing. ISBN 0-920852-49-1.
- Colledge, J. J.; Warlow, Ben (2006) [1969]. Ships of the Royal Navy: The Complete Record of All Fighting Ships of the Royal Navy from the 15th Century to the Present (3rd Rev ed.). London: Chatham Publishing. ISBN 978-1-86176-281-8. OCLC 67375475.
- Gardiner, Robert; Chumbley, Stephen & Budzbon, Przemysław, eds. (1995). Conway's All the World's Fighting Ships 1947–1995. Annapolis, Maryland: Naval Institute Press. ISBN 1-55750-132-7.
- Macpherson, Ken & Barrie, Ron (2002). The Ships of Canada's Naval Forces 1910–2002 (Third ed.). St. Catharines, Ontario: Vanwell Publishing. ISBN 1-55125-072-1.
- Moore, John, ed. (1981). Jane's Fighting Ships, 1981–1982. New York: Jane's Information Group. ISBN 0-531-03977-3.
