= CNAV Eastore =

Former Canadian Navy auxiliary ship

History
- Name: FS-554
- Owner: United States Army
- Builder: Brunswick Marine Construction Co., Brunswick, Georgia
- Yard number: 139
- Completed: November 1944
- Fate: Transferred to Royal Canadian Navy

Canada
- Name: Eastore
- Acquired: 1944
- Commissioned: 7 December 1944
- Decommissioned: 8 April 1946
- Identification: IMO number: 6521525
- Fate: Sold 30 July 1964
- Notes: Became CNAV in 1946

General characteristics
- Type: Design 381 freighter
- Tonnage: 560 GRT; 262 NRT
- Displacement: 803 long tons (816 t)
- Length: 53.9 m (176 ft 10 in) oa; 50.7 m (166 ft 4 in) pp
- Beam: 9.8 m (32 ft 2 in)
- Draught: 2.7 m (9 ft 0 in)
- Installed power: 1,000 bhp (746 kW)
- Propulsion: GM diesel engines
- Speed: 10.8 knots (20.0 km/h; 12.4 mph)
- Armament: 1 × 4 in (102 mm) gun; 2 × 20 mm (0.79 in) cannon

CNAV Eastore was a coastal auxiliary ship in service with the Royal Canadian Navy during World War II and the Cold War. Eastore, originally constructed as the United States Army Design 381 freighter FS-554, was acquired in 1944 and entered service with the Royal Canadian Navy in December of that year. The ship was paid off on 8 April 1946 and re-entered service as a naval auxiliary (CNAV). The ship remained in service with the Royal Canadian Navy until sold on 30 July 1964.

== Description ==
Eastore was 53.9 m (176 ft 10 in) long overall and 50.7 m (166 ft 4 in) between perpendiculars, with a beam of 9.8 m (32 ft 2 in) and a draught of 2.7 m (9 ft 0 in). The ship had a displacement of 803 long tons (816 t), a gross register tonnage (GRT) of 560 tons and a net register tonnage (NRT) of 262 tons. The vessel was powered by General Motors diesel engines driving two screws rated at 1,000 brake horsepower (750 kW). The ship had a maximum speed of 10.8 knots (20.0 km/h; 12.4 mph). During World War II, Eastore was armed with one 4-inch (102 mm) naval gun and two 20 mm (0.79 in) cannon.

== Service history ==
The ship was initially constructed for the United States Army as the coastal freighter FS-554. The ship was built by the Brunswick Marine Construction Company at their yard in Brunswick, Georgia, and was completed in November 1944. Transferred to the Royal Canadian Navy, the ship was renamed Eastore and commissioned on 7 December 1944. The ship was used as a supply vessel on the east coast of Canada during World War II. Eastore was paid off on 8 April 1946. Following the war, Eastore was redesignated a naval auxiliary (AKS) and given the prefix "CNAV". The vessel was sold on 30 July 1964. The ship's registry was deleted on 4 August 2010 due to the ship's existence being in doubt.
