= HMCS Fortune =

Bay-class minesweeper

History

Canada
- Name: Fortune
- Namesake: Fortune Bay
- Builder: Victoria Machinery Depot, Victoria
- Yard number: 56
- Laid down: 24 April 1952
- Launched: 14 April 1953
- Commissioned: 3 November 1954
- Decommissioned: 28 February 1964
- Identification: IMO number: 6123317; Pennant number: MCB 151
- Fate: Sold into mercantile service. Refitted as charter yacht MV Edgewater Fortune.
- Badge: Barry wavy of ten argent and azure, a rounded sable, edged or, upon which an equilateral triangle or from each side of which a wind argent the wings counter-clockwise

General characteristics
- Class & type: Bay-class minesweeper
- Displacement: 390 long tons (400 t); 412 long tons (419 t) (deep load)
- Length: 152 ft (46 m)
- Beam: 28 ft (8.5 m)
- Draught: 8 ft (2.4 m)
- Propulsion: 2 shafts, 2 GM 12-cylinder diesels, 2,400 bhp (1,800 kW)
- Speed: 16 knots (30 km/h; 18 mph)
- Complement: 38
- Armament: 1 × Bofors 40 mm gun

HMCS Fortune was a Bay-class minesweeper built for the Royal Canadian Navy. Named for Fortune Bay, located in Newfoundland, the vessel served in the Royal Canadian Navy for ten years before being sold for commercial purposes. Renamed MV Edgewater Fortune she saw service as a commercial yacht.

== Design ==
The Bay class were designed and ordered as replacements for the Second World War-era minesweepers that the Royal Canadian Navy operated at the time. Similar to the Ton-class minesweeper, they were constructed of wood planking and aluminum framing.

Displacing 390 long tons (400 t) and 412 long tons (419 t) at deep load, the minesweepers were 152 ft (46 m) long with a beam of 28 ft (8.5 m) and a draught of 8 ft (2.4 m). They had a complement of 38 officers and ratings. (Note: Gardiner and Chumbley claim the complement was 40.) The Bay-class minesweepers were powered by two GM 12-cylinder diesel engines driving two shafts creating 2,400 brake horsepower (1,800 kW). This gave the ships a maximum speed of 16 knots (30 km/h; 18 mph). The ships were armed with one Bofors 40 mm gun and were equipped with minesweeping gear.

== Service ==
Initially named Belle Isle, Fortune was laid down on 24 April 1952 by Victoria Machinery Depot at Victoria with the yard number 51 and launched on 14 April 1953. The minesweeper was commissioned on 3 November 1954 with the hull identification number 151.

Fortune joined the Second Canadian Minesweeping Squadron after commissioning. In November 1955, the Second Canadian Minesweeping Squadron was among the Canadian units that took part in one of the largest naval exercises since the Second World War off the coast of California.

After nine years of naval service, including acting as the flagship of the Second Canadian Minesweeping Squadron during the Cuban Missile Crisis, Fortune was decommissioned on 28 February 1964. Put up for auction in 1965 by the Crown Assets Corporation, the ship was then sold into mercantile service. She was initially known as Greenpeace Two and used in an unsuccessful attempt to stop the Cannikin nuclear test in the Aleutians in November 1971. The vessel was then refitted as the charter yacht MV Edgewater Fortune and was used for short cruises along the coast of British Columbia. She was also occasionally used for fishing, and for school trips to learn about the wildlife on the coast and in the water. Subsequently, the ship was turned into a 4,000-square-foot (370 m^{2}) floating home in Vancouver.
