= HMCS Chaleur (MCB 144) =

History

Canada
- Name: Chaleur
- Namesake: Chaleur Bay
- Builder: Port Arthur Shipbuilding Co., Port Arthur
- Laid down: 8 June 1951
- Launched: 21 June 1952
- Commissioned: 18 June 1954
- Decommissioned: 30 September 1954
- Identification: MCB 144
- Fate: Sold to France as La Dieppoise
- Badge: A field pile or and gules above a barry wavy azure and argent, and in the center an equilateral triangle azure bearing a fern leaf or.

France
- Name: La Dieppoise
- Acquired: 9 October 1954
- Commissioned: 13 November 1954
- Decommissioned: 9 July 1987
- Stricken: 1987
- Identification: P 655
- Fate: Sunk as artificial reef at Nouméa, 19 January 1988

General characteristics
- Class & type: Bay-class minesweeper
- Displacement: 390 long tons (400 t); 412 long tons (419 t) (deep load)
- Length: 152 ft (46 m)
- Beam: 28 ft (8.5 m)
- Draught: 8 ft (2.4 m)
- Propulsion: 2 shafts, 2 GM 12-cylinder diesels, 2,400 bhp (1,800 kW)
- Speed: 16 knots (30 km/h; 18 mph)
- Complement: 38
- Armament: 1 × Bofors 40 mm gun

HMCS Chaleur was a Bay-class minesweeper that served in the Royal Canadian Navy for three and a half months in 1954 before being sold to the French Navy to become La Dieppoise. The ship was named for Chaleur Bay, located between Quebec and New Brunswick. Her name was given to her replacement, Chaleur (MCB 164). As La Dieppoise, the vessel served as a coastal patrol vessel in the France's Pacific Ocean territories. The ship was taken out of service in 1987. In January 1988, the vessel was sunk as an artificial reef in the lagoon of Nouméa.

== Design ==
The Bay-class ships were designed and ordered as replacement for the Second World War-era minesweepers that the Royal Canadian Navy operated at the time. Similar to the Ton-class minesweeper, they were constructed of wood planking and aluminum framing.

Displacing 390 long tons (400 t) and 412 long tons (419 t) at deep load, the minesweepers were 152 ft (46 m) long with a beam of 28 ft (8.5 m) and a draught of 8 ft (2.4 m). They had a complement of 38 officers and ratings. (Note: Gardiner, Chumbley & Budzbon claim the complement was 40.)

The Bay-class minesweepers were powered by two GM 12-cylinder diesel engines driving two shafts creating 2,400 brake horsepower (1,800 kW). This gave the ships a maximum speed of 16 knots (30 km/h; 18 mph). The ships were armed with one Bofors 40 mm gun and were equipped with minesweeping gear.

== Service history ==
Chaleur was laid down on 8 June 1951 by Port Arthur Shipbuilding at Port Arthur, Ontario with the yard number 107 and launched 21 June 1952. The vessel was commissioned into the Royal Canadian Navy on 18 June 1954 with the hull identification number 144.

Following commissioning, Chaleur spent three months in service with the Royal Canadian Navy. The minesweeper was paid off on 30 September 1954. She was transferred to France on 9 October 1954. The minesweeper was commissioned on 13 November 1954 and renamed La Dieppoise. The vessel was based at Brest, France and then Diego Suarez in 1972. She served as a minesweeper until 1973 when the minesweeping gear was removed and she transferred to the Pacific for duty as an overseas territories patrol vessel. The ship was transferred to Nouméa on 29 June 1976, where La Dieppoise remained for the rest of her career. She was paid off 9 July 1987 and stricken later that year. The last wooden minesweeper in French service, the ship was selected for use as an artificial reef and recreational diving site with Nouméa's lagoon. Initially planned to be sunk on 12 January 1988, the event was postponed due to the arrival of Cyclone Anne until 19 January. The vessel was towed out into the lagoon by the tugboat Le Pivert and successfully sunk on 19 January.
