= Endeavour-class research ship =

Canadian military research ships

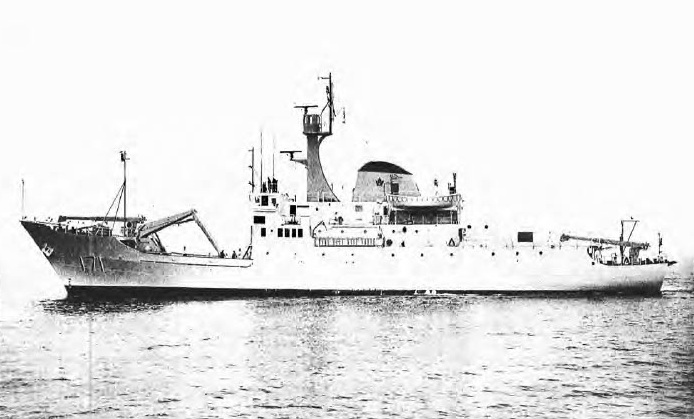
- CNAV Endeavour in 1964-1965

Class overview
- Operators: Royal Canadian Navy; Maritime Command
- In commission: 1965–1998
- Planned: 2
- Completed: 2
- Retired: 2

General characteristics
- Type: Oceanographic research ship
- Displacement: 1,560 long tons (1,590 t)
- Length: 236 ft 0 in (71.9 m)
- Beam: 38 ft 6 in (11.7 m)
- Draught: 13 ft 0 in (4.0 m)
- Propulsion: Diesel electric, 2 shafts, 2,960 shp (2,207 kW)
- Speed: 16 knots (30 km/h)
- Complement: 50
- Aviation facilities: Helicopter deck

The Endeavour class were non-combat naval ships used by the Canadian Forces for oceanographic research.

There were at least two ships built in this class, HMCS Endeavour (AGOR 171), and CFAV Quest (AGOR 172), originally HMCS Quest.
