= HMCS Cedarwood =

Surveying vessel in the Royal Canadian Navy

History
- Name: J.E. Kinney (1943–44); General Schmidlin (1944–46)
- Owner: J.E.Kinney Co Ltd (1943–44); Canadian Army (1944–46)
- Port of registry: Halifax (Canada) (1943–46)
- Builder: Smith and Rhuland
- Launched: 1941
- Out of service: 1948
- Fate: Acquired by Royal Canadian Navy 1948

Canada
- Name: Cedarwood
- Acquired: 1946
- Commissioned: 22 September 1948
- Decommissioned: 9 July 1958
- Identification: AGSC 539
- Fate: Sold for mercantile use 1959
- Badge: Or, parted in base wavy azure, a cedar tree eradicated, trunk and branches vert, roots of the first in base

History
- Name: Cedarwood
- Owner: Coast Cargo Services Ltd (1959–65); McCartney Enterprises Ltd & Berven Enterprises Ltd (1965–66); Offshore Seismic Services Ltd (1966–69)
- Port of registry: Vancouver (Canada) (1959–66); Nassau (The Bahamas) (1966–69)
- In service: 1959
- Out of service: 1969
- Fate: Broken up, 1969

General characteristics
- Type: Survey ship
- Displacement: 566 long tons (575 t)
- Length: 166.0 ft (50.6 m)
- Beam: 30.5 ft (9.3 m)
- Draught: 10.0 ft (3.0 m)
- Propulsion: 1 × Fairbanks Morse diesel engine
- Speed: 11 knots (20 km/h; 13 mph)
- Complement: 23

HMCS Cedarwood was a surveying vessel in the Royal Canadian Navy. She was a wooden sailing ship that was built as MV J.E. Kinney by Smith and Rhuland at Lunenburg, Nova Scotia and used in the harbours of the east coast of Canada by the Royal Canadian Army Service Corps as General Schmidlin during the Second World War. Following the war the vessel was purchased by the Royal Canadian Navy. The ship was sold again for mercantile service in 1959 and remained in service until 1969.

== Description ==
Cedarwood was 166 feet (51 m) long with a beam of 30 feet 6 inches (9.30 m) and a draught of 10 feet (3.0 m). Cedarwood had a displacement of 566 tons. The vessel was powered by one Fairbanks Morse diesel engine making the ship capable of 11 knots (20 km/h; 13 mph) and had a complement of 23.

== Service history ==
=== MV J.E. Kinney and RCASC General Schmidlin ===
Launched at Lunenburg in 1941 by Smith and Rhuland as MV J.E. Kinney, she was taken over by the Royal Canadian Army Service Corps in 1944 during the Second World War and renamed General Schmidlin. She was used to resupply Canadian Army detachments scattered throughout the Maritimes. During the war, General Schmidlin was used to tow targets for shore batteries. In April 1944 the vessel was spotted by a U-boat off Halifax, Nova Scotia and chased. General Schmidlin escaped the German submarine by fleeing to Halifax. Upon arrival it was found that every bearing in her engine had been burned out. Following the war, the Canadian Army placed the ship in reserve.

=== Royal Canadian Navy and mercantile service ===
General Schmidlin transferred to the west coast in 1946 and was used as an ammunition dumping tender by the Army. General Schmidlin's purchase by the Royal Canadian Navy was requested by the Pacific Oceanographic Group who wished to use her as an oceanographic survey vessel to replace HMCS Ekholi, which was considered too small for their needs. The ship was acquired in 1946. The purchase was approved and she was renamed Cedarwood and commissioned on 22 September 1948.

Cedarwood was based in Esquimalt. During her service with the Royal Canadian Navy she was used to travel into the Arctic Ocean and test equipment. She also did bathythermographic surveys along with general biology, oceanography and acoustic surveys. During her time in the Bering Sea, she laid submarine cables and carried scientists of both Canada and the United States on survey missions, mapping a large amount of the British Columbia coastline. On 22 September 1950, Cedarwood was heavily damaged by a storm while in the Hecate Strait. The repairs took a month to fix. She continued in her service until she was paid off on 9 July 1958.

After her naval service she was converted as a replica of the paddle steamer Beaver and then had other dummy fittings added to play the role of the steamer Commodore during the British Columbia centennial celebrations. She was sold in 1959 to Coast Cargo Services Ltd of Vancouver, keeping her name. Cedarwood was sold again in 1965 McCartney Enterprises Ltd & Berven Enterprises Ltd of Vancouver before being acquired by Offshore Seismic Services Ltd and having her port of registry changed to Nassau, Bahamas in 1966. Cedarwood was broken up in 1969.
