= Dun-class tanker =

Class overview
- Name: Dun class
- Builders: Canadian Bridge Company, Windsor
- Operators: Royal Canadian Navy
- Planned: 2
- Completed: 2
- Scrapped: 2

General characteristics
- Type: Tanker
- Displacement: 950 long tons (970 t)
- Length: 178 ft 9 in (54.5 m)
- Beam: 33 ft 2 in (10.1 m)
- Draught: 13 ft 0 in (4.0 m)
- Propulsion: 2 × shaft, diesel engine, 700 bhp (522 kW)
- Speed: 11 knots (20 km/h; 13 mph)
- Complement: 30
- Armament: 1 × QF 12-pounder 12 cwt naval gun; 2 × single 20 mm Oerlikon cannon

The Dun class of tankers comprised two ships, HMCS Dundalk and HMCS Dundurn, constructed for the Royal Canadian Navy during the Second World War. The two vessels were ordered by the Royal Canadian Navy to fill a need to transport fuel oil for convoy escorts in the Battle of the Atlantic. The two vessels began their careers in 1943 and remained in naval service until 1946. Following the end of the war, they were crewed by civilians as naval auxiliaries until the 1980s. Dundalk was wrecked in 1984 and Dundurn's ultimate fate is unknown.

== Description ==
The Dun class were small tankers, displacing 950 long tons (970 t) and 1,500 long tons (1,500 t) at full load. They were 178 feet 9 inches (54.5 m) long with a beam of 33 feet 2 inches (10.1 m) and a draught of 13 feet 0 inches (4.0 m). The vessels were powered by a Fairbanks-Morse diesel engine driving two shafts rated at 700 brake horsepower (522 kW). This gave the tankers a maximum speed of 11 knots (20 km/h; 13 mph). The Dun class were armed with one QF 12-pounder 12 cwt naval gun and two single-mounted 20 mm Oerlikon cannon during the Second World War. (Note: "Cwt" is the abbreviation for hundredweight, 20 cwt referring to the weight of the gun) The two vessels had a complement of 3 officers and 27 enlisted. This was later reduced to a total complement of 24. The vessels could carry 790 long tons (800 t) of fuel oil and 25 long tons (25 t) of dry cargo.

== Ships in class ==
Dun class construction data
Name	Pennant number	Commissioned	Paid off	Fate
Dundalk	Z40/501	13 November 1943	9 April 1946	Became naval auxiliary (CNAV) until 1982
Dundurn	Z41/502	25 November 1943	2 January 1947	Became naval auxiliary (CNAV) until 1993

== Service history ==
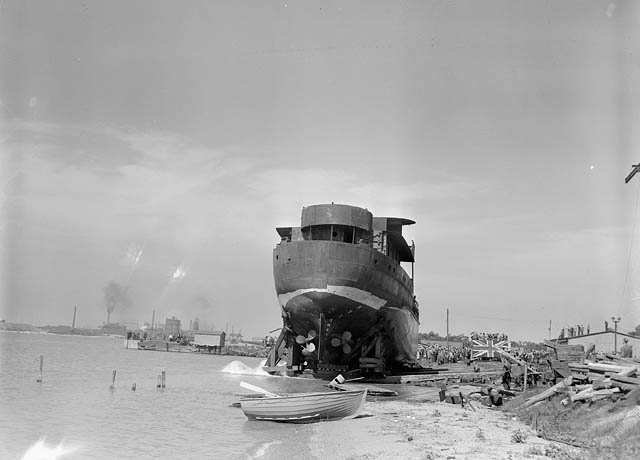
The launch of Dundurn at the Canadian Bridge Company in 1943

Dundalk and Dundurn were ordered by the Royal Canadian Navy in 1942 after efforts to find a solution for the transportation of fuel oil for the convoy escorts along the Atlantic Coast had been found insufficient. The two ships were constructed by the Canadian Bridge Company at their shipyard in Walkerville, Ontario. Dundalk was launched on 4 July 1943 and Dundurn on 18 September of that year. Dundalk was commissioned on 13 November 1943 and Dundurn on 25 November.

During the Second World War, both vessels were used to transport fuel oil from refineries around Halifax, Nova Scotia to other naval bases along the Atlantic Coast being used by convoy escorts in the Battle of the Atlantic. Dundalk would sometimes be employed as a lighter. Following the end of the war, the Royal Canadian Navy intended to continue to use the vessels in this work instead of relying on civilian contractors. Dundalk was paid off on 9 April 1946. The vessel became a Canadian naval auxiliary vessel (CNAV) with a civilian crew but remained under naval control. Dundurn was transferred to the West Coast of Canada, based at Esquimalt, British Columbia and paid off on 2 January 1947 for service as a CNAV. In 1948, Dundalk was used to transport fuel oil from Halifax to Churchill, Manitoba in preparation for an Arctic cruise by large Canadian warships. In order to navigate in Hudson Bay, the ship was fitted with a gyro compass due to the poor navigation charts of the area. At Port Burwell, Dundalk refuelled the destroyers HMCS Haida and HMCS Nootka. Dundalk remained in service at a CNAV and later as a CFAV (Canadian Forces auxiliary vessel) until 17 December 1982. (Note: Macpherson & Barrie claim the vessel remained a CNAV until 13 November 1959.) Dundalk was wrecked on 7 November 1984. Dundurn remained in service on the West Coast until 1993. Thev vessel was eventually sold to the Burrard Yacht Club of Vancouver on 8 May 1996 to be used as a floating breakwater.

== Sources ==
- Elliot-Meisel, Elizabeth B. (April 1999). "Arctic Focus: The Royal Canadian Navy in Arctic Waters, 1946–1949". The Northern Mariner. IX (2). ISSN 1183-112X.
- Macpherson, Ken & Barrie, Ron (2002). The Ships of Canada's Naval Forces 1910–2002 (Third ed.). St. Catharines, Ontario: Vanwell Publishing. ISBN 1-55125-072-1.
- Moore, John, ed. (1981). Jane's Fighting Ships 1981–82. New York: Jane's Publishing Incorporated. ISBN 0-531-03977-3.
- Sharpe, Richard, ed. (1990). Jane's Fighting Ships 1990–91 (93 ed.). Surrey, United Kingdom: Jane's Information Group. ISBN 0-7106-0904-3.
- Tucker, Gilbert Norman (1952). The Naval Service of Canada, Its Official History – Volume 2: Activities on Shore During the Second World War. Ottawa: King's Printer. OCLC 4346983.
