= HMCS Ungava (MCB 148) =

Warship

History

Canada
- Name: Ungava
- Namesake: Ungava Bay
- Builder: Davie Shipbuilding, Lauzon
- Laid down: 17 December 1951
- Launched: 20 May 1953
- Commissioned: 4 June 1954
- Decommissioned: 23 August 1957
- Identification: MCB 148
- Honours and awards: Atlantic 1941–45
- Fate: Sold in 1958 to Turkey as Tekirdağ
- Badge: Parted in fess azure and argent, in the fess honour point a roundel of the first surrounded sable, in the base of which barry wavy of six argent and azure from which issues a demi polar bear proper.

Turkey
- Name: Tekirdağ
- Acquired: 31 March 1958
- Out of service: 1991
- Identification: M 533
- Fate: Broken up 2002

General characteristics
- Class & type: Bay-class minesweeper
- Displacement: 390 long tons (400 t); 412 long tons (419 t) (deep load)
- Length: 152 ft (46 m)
- Beam: 28 ft (8.5 m)
- Draught: 8 ft (2.4 m)
- Propulsion: 2 shafts, 2 GM 12-cylinder diesels, 2,400 bhp (1,800 kW)
- Speed: 16 knots (30 km/h; 18 mph)
- Range: 3,290 nmi (6,090 km; 3,790 mi) at 12 kn (22 km/h; 14 mph)
- Complement: 38
- Armament: 1 × 40 mm Bofors gun

HMCS Ungava (hull number MCB 148) was a Bay-class minesweeper that was constructed for the Royal Canadian Navy during the Cold War. Entering service in 1954, the minesweeper was paid off in 1958 and transferred to the Turkish Navy. Renamed Tekirdağ, the ship remained in service until 1991 and was broken up in 2002.

== Design and description ==
The Bay class were designed and ordered as replacements for the Second World War-era minesweepers that the Royal Canadian Navy operated at the time. Similar to the Ton-class minesweeper, they were constructed of wood planking and aluminum framing.

Displacing 390 long tons (400 t) standard at 412 long tons (419 t) at deep load, the minesweepers were 152 ft (46 m) long with a beam of 28 ft (8.5 m) and a draught of 8 ft (2.4 m). They had a complement of 38 officers and ratings. (Note: Gardiner and Chumbley claim the complement was 40.)

The Bay-class minesweepers were powered by two GM 12-cylinder diesel engines driving two shafts creating 2,400 brake horsepower (1,800 kW). This gave the ships a maximum speed of 16 knots (30 km/h; 18 mph) and a range of 3,290 nautical miles (6,090 km; 3,790 mi) at 12 knots (22 km/h; 14 mph). The ships were armed with one 40 mm Bofors gun and were equipped with minesweeping gear.

== Operational history ==
The ship's keel was laid down on 17 December 1951 by Davie Shipbuilding at their yard in Lauzon, Quebec. Named for a bay located in Quebec, Ungava was launched on 20 May 1953. The ship was commissioned on 4 June 1954. The ship joined the First Canadian Minesweeping Squadron upon commissioning. The squadron sailed to the Caribbean Sea in April 1955 for a training cruise, making several port visits. In May 1956, Ungava was detached from the squadron for duties for naval commanders in Newfoundland.

The ship remained in service with the Royal Canadian Navy until being paid off on 23 August 1957. The ship was transferred to the Turkish Navy as part of the NATO Mutual Aid Agreement on 31 March 1958. Renamed Tekirdağ by the Turkish Navy, the vessel sailed for Turkey on 19 May 1958. The ship remained in service until 1991. Tekirdağ was broken up for scrap at Aliağa, Turkey in 2002.

== Notes ==
=== References ===
- Arbuckle, J. Graeme (1987). Badges of the Canadian Navy. Halifax, Nova Scotia: Nimbus Publishing. ISBN 0-920852-49-1.
- Colledge, J. J.; Warlow, Ben (2006) [1969]. Ships of the Royal Navy: The Complete Record of All Fighting Ships of the Royal Navy from the 15th Century to the Present (3rd Rev ed.). London: Chatham Publishing. ISBN 978-1-86176-281-8. OCLC 67375475.
- Gardiner, Robert; Chumbley, Stephen; Budzbon, Przemysław, eds. (1995). Conway's All the World's Fighting Ships 1947–1995. Annapolis, Maryland: Naval Institute Press. ISBN 1-55750-132-7.
- Macpherson, Ken; Barrie, Ron (2002). The Ships of Canada's Naval Forces 1910–2002 (Third ed.). St. Catharines, Ontario: Vanwell Publishing. ISBN 1-55125-072-1.
- Milner, Marc (2010). Canada's Navy: The First Century (Second ed.). Toronto: University of Toronto Press. ISBN 978-0-8020-9604-3.
- Moore, John, ed. (1981). Jane's Fighting Ships, 1981–1982. New York: Jane's Information Group. ISBN 0-531-03977-3.
