= HMCS Fundy (MCB 145) =

History

Canada
- Name: Fundy
- Namesake: Bay of Fundy
- Builder: Saint John Shipbuilding, Saint John, New Brunswick
- Laid down: 19 June 1951
- Launched: 9 December 1953
- Commissioned: 19 March 1954
- Decommissioned: 31 March 1954
- Identification: MCB 145
- Motto: Verimus altum; ("We sweep the deep")
- Honours and awards: Atlantic 1939–45
- Fate: Transferred to French Navy 1954
- Badge: Gules, a pile azure, fimbriated argent charged with a maple leaf between two fleurs-de-lis, all conjoined on the one stem, or

France
- Name: La Dunkerquoise
- Acquired: 31 March 1954
- Commissioned: 21 May 1954
- Decommissioned: 15 October 1986
- Stricken: 1986
- Identification: P 653
- Fate: Discarded 1986

General characteristics
- Class & type: Bay-class minesweeper
- Displacement: 390 long tons (400 t); 412 long tons (419 t) (deep load)
- Length: 152 ft (46 m)
- Beam: 28 ft (8.5 m)
- Draught: 8 ft (2.4 m)
- Propulsion: 2 shafts, 2 GM 12-cylinder diesels, 2,400 bhp (1,800 kW)
- Speed: 16 knots (30 km/h; 18 mph)
- Range: 3,290 nmi (6,090 km; 3,790 mi) at 12 kn (22 km/h; 14 mph)
- Complement: 38
- Armament: 1 × 40 mm Bofors gun

HMCS Fundy (hull number MCB 145) was a Bay-class minesweeper that was constructed for the Royal Canadian Navy during the Cold War. The minesweeper entered service in March 1954 and was transferred later that month to the French Navy. Renamed La Dunkerquoise, the ship was converted to a territorial patrol vessel in 1973 and remained in service until 1984. La Dunkerquoise was discarded in 1986.

== Design and description ==
The Bay class were designed and ordered as replacements for the Second World War-era minesweepers that the Royal Canadian Navy operated at the time. Similar to the Ton-class minesweeper, they were constructed of wood planking and aluminum framing.

Displacing 390 long tons (400 t) standard at 412 long tons (419 t) at deep load, the minesweepers were 152 ft (46 m) long with a beam of 28 ft (8.5 m) and a draught of 8 ft (2.4 m). They had a complement of 38 officers and ratings. (Note: Gardiner and Chumbley claim the complement was 40.)

The Bay-class minesweepers were powered by two GM 12-cylinder diesel engines driving two shafts creating 2,400 brake horsepower (1,800 kW). This gave the ships a maximum speed of 16 knots (30 km/h; 18 mph) and a range of 3,290 nautical miles (6,090 km; 3,790 mi) at 12 knots (22 km/h; 14 mph). The ships were armed with one 40 mm Bofors gun and were equipped with minesweeping gear.

== Operational history ==
The ship's keel was laid down on 19 June 1951 by Saint John Shipbuilding at their yard in Saint John, New Brunswick. Named for a bay located between New Brunswick and Nova Scotia, Fundy was launched on 9 December 1953. The ship was commissioned on 19 March 1954.

Fundy remained in Canadian service for only a few weeks as the vessel was paid off on 31 March 1954. The minesweeper was transferred to the French Navy the same day and renamed La Dunkerquoise. The ship was commissioned into the French Navy on 21 May 1954. She served as a minesweeper until 1973 when the minesweeping gear was removed and La Dunkerquoise transferred to the Pacific Ocean for duty as an overseas territories patrol vessel. The vessel remained in service until 1984 and was paid off on 15 October 1986. The ship was stricken in 1986.

== Notes ==
=== References ===
- Arbuckle, J. Graeme (1987). Badges of the Canadian Navy. Halifax, Nova Scotia: Nimbus Publishing. ISBN 0-920852-49-1.
- Colledge, J. J.; Warlow, Ben (2006) [1969]. Ships of the Royal Navy: The Complete Record of All Fighting Ships of the Royal Navy from the 15th Century to the Present (3rd Rev ed.). London: Chatham Publishing. ISBN 978-1-86176-281-8. OCLC 67375475.
- Gardiner, Robert; Chumbley, Stephen; Budzbon, Przemysław, eds. (1995). Conway's All the World's Fighting Ships 1947–1995. Annapolis, Maryland: Naval Institute Press. ISBN 1-55750-132-7.
- Macpherson, Ken; Barrie, Ron (2002). The Ships of Canada's Naval Forces 1910–2002 (Third ed.). St. Catharines, Ontario: Vanwell Publishing. ISBN 1-55125-072-1.
- Moore, John, ed. (1981). Jane's Fighting Ships, 1981–1982. New York: Jane's Information Group. ISBN 0-531-03977-3.
