= HMCS Chignecto (MCB 156) =

History

Canada
- Name: Chignecto
- Namesake: Chignecto Bay
- Builder: Marine Industries, Sorel
- Laid down: 4 June 1951
- Launched: 13 June 1952
- Commissioned: 1 December 1953
- Decommissioned: 31 March 1954
- Identification: MCB 156
- Fate: Transferred to French Navy 1954
- Badge: Gules, a pile azure fimbriated argent charged with a sprig of bulrush or.

France
- Name: La Bayonnaise
- Acquired: 31 March 1954
- Stricken: 1976
- Identification: P 654
- Fate: Broken up 1977

General characteristics
- Class & type: Bay-class minesweeper
- Displacement: 390 long tons (400 t); 412 long tons (419 t) (deep load)
- Length: 152 ft (46 m)
- Beam: 28 ft (8.5 m)
- Draught: 8 ft (2.4 m)
- Propulsion: 2 shafts, 2 GM 12-cylinder diesels, 2,400 bhp (1,800 kW)
- Speed: 16 knots (30 km/h; 18 mph)
- Range: 3,290 nmi (6,090 km; 3,790 mi) at 12 kn (22 km/h; 14 mph)
- Complement: 38
- Armament: 1 x 40 mm Bofors gun

HMCS Chignecto (hull number MCB 156) was a Bay-class minesweeper that served in the Royal Canadian Navy during the Cold War. The ship entered service in 1953 and in 1954, was transferred to the French Navy and renamed La Bayonnaise. Serving as a minesweeper until 1973, the ship became a territorial patrol ship and remained in service until 1976. La Bayonnaise was broken up for scrap in 1977.

== Design and description ==
The Bay class were designed and ordered as replacements for the Second World War-era minesweepers that the Royal Canadian Navy operated at the time. Similar to the Ton-class minesweeper, they were constructed of wood planking and aluminum framing. Displacing 390 long tons (400 t) standard at 412 long tons (419 t) at deep load, the minesweepers were 152 ft (46 m) long with a beam of 28 ft (8.5 m) and a draught of 8 ft (2.4 m). They had a complement of 38 officers and ratings. (Note: Gardiner, Chumbley & Budzbon claim the complement was 40.)

The Bay-class minesweepers were powered by two GM 12-cylinder diesel engines driving two shafts creating 2,400 brake horsepower (1,800 kW). This gave the ships a maximum speed of 16 knots (30 km/h; 18 mph) and a range of 3,290 nautical miles (6,090 km; 3,790 mi) at 12 knots (22 km/h; 14 mph). The ships were armed with one 40 mm Bofors gun and were equipped with minesweeping gear.

== Operational history ==
The ship's keel was laid down on 4 June 1951 by Marine Industries at their yard in Sorel, Quebec. Named for a bay located between Nova Scotia and New Brunswick, Chignecto was launched on 13 June 1953. The ship was commissioned on 1 December 1953.

Chignecto served with the Royal Canadian Navy for three months before being paid off on 31 March 1954. Transferred the same day to the French Navy, the ship was renamed La Bayonnaise and given the hull number P 654. She served as a minesweeper until 1973 when the minesweeping gear was removed and she transferred to the Pacific for duty as an overseas territories patrol vessel. The vessel was discarded in 1976 and broken up for scrap at Papeete, Tahiti.
