= HMCS Comox (MCB 146) =

History

Canada
- Name: Comox
- Builder: Victoria Machinery Depot, Victoria
- Laid down: 8 June 1951
- Launched: 24 April 1952
- Commissioned: 2 April 1954
- Decommissioned: 11 September 1957
- Identification: MCB 146
- Motto: Ut habeas da (Give that what you may)
- Fate: Sold in 1957 to Turkey as Tırebolu.
- Badge: argent, an ox-head erased at the shoulders and facing the dexter sable having upon its head a cock's comb gules

Turkey
- Name: Tırebolu
- Acquired: 1957
- Commissioned: 31 March 1958
- Stricken: 1995

General characteristics
- Class & type: Bay-class minesweeper
- Displacement: 390 long tons (400 t); 412 long tons (419 t) (deep load)
- Length: 152 ft (46 m)
- Beam: 28 ft (8.5 m)
- Draught: 8 ft (2.4 m)
- Propulsion: 2 shafts, 2 GM 12-cylinder diesels, 2,400 bhp (1,800 kW)
- Speed: 16 knots (30 km/h; 18 mph)
- Complement: 38
- Armament: 1 × Bofors 40 mm gun

HMCS Comox was a Bay-class minesweeper built for the Royal Canadian Navy during the Cold War. The vessel was named for Comox Harbour, a bay in British Columbia. The minesweeper was later transferred to the Turkish Navy where she was renamed Tirebolu and served until 1996.

== Design ==
The Bay class were designed and ordered as replacements for the Second World War-era minesweepers that the Royal Canadian Navy operated at the time. Similar to the Ton-class minesweeper, they were constructed of wood planking and aluminum framing.

Displacing 390 long tons (400 t) and 412 long tons (419 t) at deep load, the minesweepers were 152 ft (46 m) long with a beam of 28 ft (8.5 m) and a draught of 8 ft (2.4 m). They had a complement of 38 officers and ratings. (Note: Gardiner and Chumbley state the complement was 40.)

The Bay-class minesweepers were powered by two GM 12-cylinder diesel engines driving two shafts creating 2,400 brake horsepower (1,800 kW). This gave the ships a maximum speed of 16 knots (30 km/h; 18 mph). The ships were armed with one Bofors 40 mm gun and were equipped with minesweeping gear.

== Service history ==
Comox was laid down on 8 June 1951 by Victoria Machinery Depot at Victoria with the yard number 53 and launched on 24 April 1952. The vessel was commissioned into the Royal Canadian Navy on 2 April 1954 with the hull identification number 146.

Comox spent three years in service with the Royal Canadian Navy. The minesweeper was paid off on 11 September 1957. She was transferred to Turkey on 31 March 1958 and renamed TCG Tirebolu with the identification number M-352. She was sold in 1996.
