= Bay-class minesweeper =

Canadian naval ship class (1953–1998)

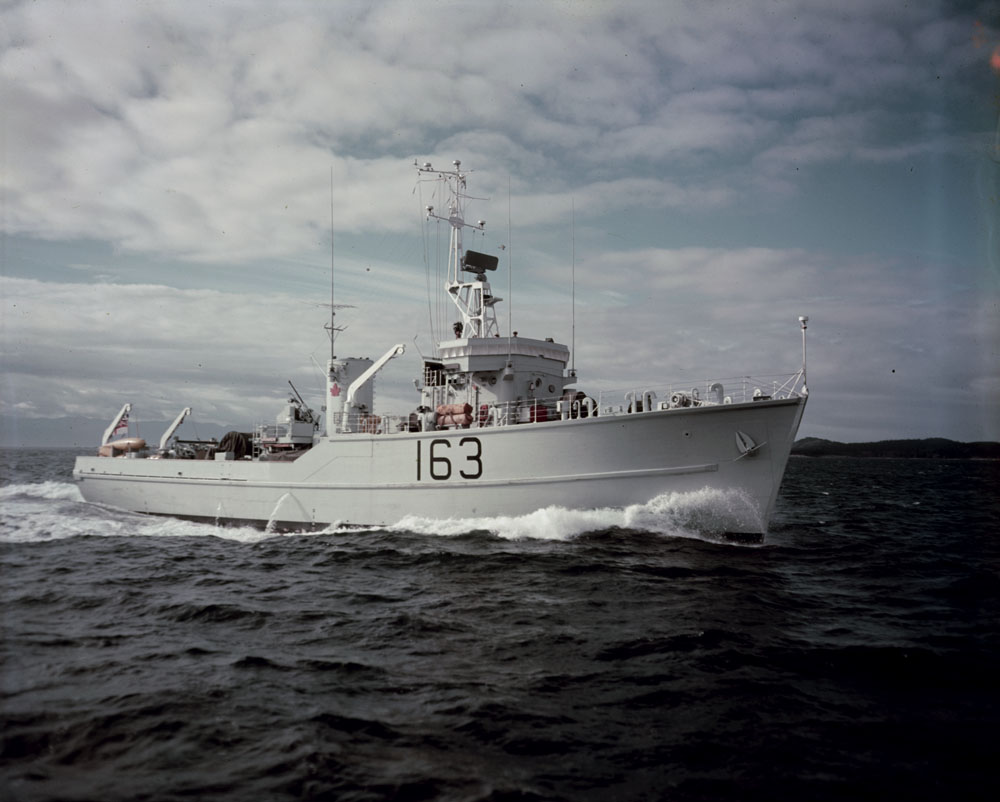
- HMCS Miramichi (MCB 163) underway

Class overview
- Name: Bay class
- Operators: Royal Canadian Navy / Canadian Forces; French Navy; Turkish Navy
- Preceded by: Algerine class
- Succeeded by: Anticosti class
- In commission: 1 December 1953 – 1998
- Completed: 20
- Retired: 20

General characteristics
- Type: Minesweeper
- Displacement: 390 t (380 long tons) standard; 412 t (405 long tons) deep load
- Length: 152 ft (46 m) oa; 140 ft (43 m) pp
- Beam: 28 ft (8.5 m)
- Draught: 8 ft 6 in (2.59 m) max
- Propulsion: 2 shafts, 2 GM 12-cylinder diesels, 2,400 bhp (1,800 kW)
- Speed: 16 knots (30 km/h; 18 mph)
- Complement: 38
- Sensors & processing systems: Mechanical minesweeping equipment (later removed)
- Armament: 1 × 40 mm Bofors single mount (later removed)
- Notes: Initial plan was for 14 vessels. 6 RCN vessels sold to allies while under construction, replaced by 6 new builds carrying the same name but new pennants.

The Bay-class minesweepers, also known as the Gaspé-class minesweepers, were a class of minesweepers operated by the Royal Canadian Navy (RCN) and Canadian Forces (CF) during the Cold War. Their design was similar to the British Ton-class minesweepers.

The class derives its name from bays in Canada and was designed by the RCN as a replacement for Second World War-era minesweepers. Fourteen were laid down in 1951–1952, however six were subsequently transferred to the French Navy in 1954. These ships were replaced by six of the same name in 1956–1957 but were assigned new pennant numbers.

They were reclassed in Canadian Forces service as patrol escorts in 1972 and six vessels remained in service until the late 1990s, providing coastal surveillance and shiphandling experience for junior officers with Maritime Forces Pacific.

== Design and description ==
The class was designed with mahogany wood planking overlaying an aluminum frame and decks. Vessels of the Bay class had a standard displacement of 390 tonnes (380 long tons) and 412 tonnes (405 long tons) at deep load. They were 152 feet (46 m) long overall and 140 feet (43 m) between perpendiculars, with a beam of 28 feet (8.5 m) and a draught of 8 feet 6 inches (2.59 m) max. They had a complement of 40.

The minesweepers were powered by two GM 12-cylinder diesel engines turning two shafts, creating 2,400 brake horsepower (1,800 kW). This gave the Bay class a maximum speed of 15 knots (28 km/h; 17 mph). They carried 52 tons of oil. The ships were armed with one 40 mm/60 caliber Mk 7 gun.

== Ships ==
Bay class construction data
Ship	Original pennant number	Builder	Laid down	Launched	Commissioned	Paid off	Fate
Chaleur	MCB 144	Port Arthur Shipbuilding, Port Arthur	8 June 1951	21 June 1952	18 June 1954	30 September 1954	Sold to France as La Dieppoise in 1954, stricken 1985.
Chaleur	MCB 164	Marine Industries, Sorel	20 February 1956	11 May 1957	12 September 1957	18 December 1998	
Chignecto	MCB 156	Marine Industries, Sorel	4 June 1951	13 June 1952	1 December 1953	31 May 1954	Sold to France as La Bayonnaise in 1954, stricken 1976.
Chignecto	MCB 160	Davie Shipbuilding, Lauzon	25 October 1955	17 November 1956	1 August 1957	19 December 1998	
Comox	MCB 146	Victoria Machinery Depot, Victoria	8 June 1951	24 April 1952	2 April 1954	11 September 1957	Sold to Turkey as Tirebolu in 1957.
Cowichan	MCB 147	Victoria Machinery Depot, Victoria	20 June 1951	12 November 1951	10 December 1953	31 March 1954	Sold to France as La Malouine in 1954, stricken 1977.
Cowichan	MCB 162	Yarrows Shipbuilding, Esquimalt	10 July 1956	26 February 1957	12 December 1957	22 August 1997	
Fortune	MCB 151	Victoria Machinery Depot, Victoria	24 April 1952	14 April 1953	3 November 1954	28 February 1964	Sold in 1964, becoming mercantile Greenpeace Two in 1966 and later Edgewater Fortune.
Fundy	MCB 145	Saint John Drydock and Shipbuilding, Saint John	19 June 1951	9 December 1953	19 March 1954	31 March 1964	Sold to France as La Dunkerquoise in 1954, stricken 1984.
Fundy	MCB 159	Davie Shipbuilding, Lauzon	7 March 1955	14 June 1956	27 November 1956	19 December 1996	
Gaspé	MCB 143	Davie Shipbuilding, Lauzon	21 March 1951	12 November 1951	5 December 1953	22 August 1957	Sold to Turkey as Trabzon in 1957.
James Bay	MCB 152	Yarrows Shipbuilding, Esquimalt	16 August 1951	12 March 1953	3 May 1954	28 February 1964	Sold into mercantile service.
Miramichi	MCB 150	Saint John Drydock and Shipbuilding, Saint John	13 June 1952	4 May 1954	30 July 1954	1 October 1964	Sold to France as La Lorientaise in 1954, stricken 1984.
Miramichi	MCB 163	Victoria Machinery Depot, Victoria	2 February 1956	22 February 1957	29 October 1957	16 December 1998	
Quinte	MCB 149	Port Arthur Shipbuilding, Port Arthur	14 June 1952	8 August 1953	15 October 1954	26 February 1964	
Resolute	MCB 154	Kingston Shipbuilding, Kingston	29 February 1951	20 June 1953	16 September 1954	14 February 1964	
Thunder	MCB 153	Canadian Vickers, Montreal	17 May 1951	17 July 1952	15 December 1953	31 March 1964	Sold to France as La Paimpolaise in 1954, stricken 1986.
Thunder	MCB 161	Port Arthur Shipbuilding, Port Arthur	1 September 1955	27 October 1956	3 October 1957	22 August 1997	
Trinity	MCB 157	Davie Shipbuilding, Lauzon	31 January 1952	31 July 1953	16 June 1954	21 August 1957	Sold to Turkey as Terme in 1957.
Ungava	MCB 148	Davie Shipbuilding, Lauzon	17 December 1951	20 May 1953	4 June 1954	23 August 1957	Sold to Turkey as Tekirdag in 1957.

== Service history ==
=== Canadian service ===
Four vessels of the class were ordered in September 1949, followed by a further 10 in 1951 to replace the Second World War-era minesweepers. The second group of new construction was a result of Canada's entry into the Korean War. Initially ascribed the classification MCA they changed to MCB in 1954. In 1954, six ships, Chaleur, Chignecto, Cowichan, Fundy, Miramichi, and Thunder were transferred to the French Navy under the Mutual Aid Agreement of NATO due to a shortage of the type in allied navies. Chignecto, Cowichan, Fundy and Thunder were transferred on 7 April at Halifax, Nova Scotia with Chaleur and Miramichi on 9 October. Their names were reused for later vessels of the class. In 1958, four more, Comox, Gaspé, Trinity and Ungava, were transferred to the Turkish Navy.

Chaleur, Fundy, Quinte and Thunder formed the First Minesweeping Squadron in 1960. In October 1960, Fundy, Thunder, Chaleur, Chignecto, Resolute and Quinte took part in the NATO naval exercise Sweep Clear V off Shelburne, Nova Scotia. The Second Minesweeping Squadron, comprising Fortune, Miramichi, Cowichan and James Bay made a port visit at Stockton, California in June 1960 before transiting into the Pacific. In May–June 1961, the First Canadian Minesweeping Squadron, composed of Chaleur, Chignecto, Fundy, Quinte, Resolute and Thunder, performed a tour of the Great Lakes, making several port visits.

In an effort to free up funding in the early 1960s for other capital projects, the remaining ten were placed in reserve. Four more of the class, Resolute, Quinte, James Bay and Fortune were paid off in 1964 and sold to commercial interests. Fortune was renamed Greenpeace Two and was used in an attempt to stop nuclear testing in the Aleutian Islands in 1971. In 1972, the six that remained were re-designated small patrol escorts with the classification PFL. In 1979 they were designated training ships with the classification PB. By 1980, they were part of the West Coast Training Squadron and they served with Training Group Pacific in the 1990s. They were discarded in the late 1990s with the second Chignecto the last to be paid off on 19 December 1998. In Canadian service they were replaced first by Anticosti class until the new Kingston-class coastal defence vessels were ready.

=== French naval service ===
In 1954 six ships were transferred to the French Navy and renamed Le Dieppoise (M 730), La Bayonnaise (M 728), La Malouine (M 727), La Dunkerquoise (M 726), La Lorientaise (M 731) and La Paimpolaise (M 729) respectively. The six vessels were transferred under the Mutual Defense Program. In the 1960s the six were modified for use as colonial patrol boats. Their minesweeping gear was removed and air conditioning installed. Their hull identification was changed to P 655, P 654, P 651, P 653, P 652, and P 657 respectively.

La Bayonnaise was stricken in 1976, followed by La Malouine in 1977. The remaining four were stationed in the Pacific until the 1980s when they were replaced by Super Patra-class patrol craft. In 1986 La Lorientaise and La Dunkerquoise were discarded and La Dieppoise and La Paimpolaise followed a year later.

=== Turkish naval service ===
In 1958, four Bay class were transferred to the Turkish Navy and renamed Tirebolu, Trabzon, Terme and Tekirdag respectively. They were transferred under NATO mutual aid.
