= Hull classification symbol (Canada) =

The Royal Canadian Navy uses hull classification symbols to identify the types of its ships, which are similar to the United States Navy's hull classification symbol system. The Royal Navy and some European and Commonwealth navies (19 in total) use a somewhat analogous system of pennant numbers.

In a ship name such as HMCS Algonquin (DDG 283) the ship prefix HMCS for Her or His Majesty's Canadian Ship indicates the vessel is a warship in service to the Monarch of Canada, while the proper name Algonquin may follow a naming convention for the class of vessel. The hull classification symbol in the example is the parenthetical suffix (DDG 283), where the hull classification type DDG indicates that the Algonquin is a guided-missile destroyer and the hull classification number 283 is unique within that type. Listed below are various hull classification types with some currently in use and others that are retired and no longer in use.

== Auxiliary ships ==
- AGOR: Auxiliary General Oceanographic Research (retired), Endeavour-class research ship
- AGSC: surveying vessel (retired) Example included: HMCS Cedarwood (AGSC 539)
- AOR: Auxiliary Oiler Replenishment, Protecteur-class replenishment oiler
- ARE: Auxiliary Replenishment Escort (retired). Examples Cape-class maintenance ship
- ASL: diving support vessel (retired from the Royal Canadian Navy) Included: HMCS Cormorant (ASL 20)
- F: escort armed ships (retired pre World War II passenger ships that were converted to military roles during the war)
- FHE: Fast Hydrofoil Escort (retired, prototype tested 1968–1971), HMCS Bras d'Or (FHE 400)
- K: sloop and submarine tender (also used for frigates and corvettes). Example included: HMCS Shearwater (K02)
- KC: sail training. Example includes: HMCS Oriole (KC 480)
- PCT: Patrol Craft Training (supersedes YAG) Examples include: Orca-class patrol vessels
- T: armed trawler (retired). Example included: HMCS Baffin (T275), Isles-class trawler
- YAG: Yard Auxiliary General (retired training vessels, superseded by PCT) YAG training vessels CFAV Grizzly (YAG 306), CFAV Cougar (YAG 308)
- YTB: Yard Tug. Examples include: Glen-class tug
- YTL: Yard Tug. Examples include: Ville-class tugs Lawrenceville (YTL 590), CFAV Parksville (YTL 591)
- YTM: Yard Tug. Example includes: CFAV Tillicum (YTM 555)
- YTR: Yard Tractor tug fireboats. Examples include: Fire-class fireboats

== Aircraft carriers ==
- CVL: light carrier (retired) Examples included: HMCS Bonaventure (CVL 22), HMCS Magnificent (CVL 21), and HMCS Warrior (CVL 20)
- D: World War II escort carrier (retired) Examples included Ruler and Attacker-class escort carriers:
- R: carrier World War II (retired, was also used for destroyers) HMCS Warrior (R31)

== Corvettes ==
- K: corvette (retired, was also used for frigates and a sloop-of-war). Examples included: Flower-class corvettes

== Cruisers ==
- C: light cruiser (retired) Examples included Crown Colony-class cruiser

== Destroyers ==
- D: destroyer - World War II era (retired) eg A-class destroyer
- DD: destroyer - World War II era (retired, DD was used by the United States Navy, I was used by the Royal Canadian Navy for US built DD destroyers)
- DDE: escort destroyer (retired) Restigouche-class destroyer
- DDH: air defence destroyer - helicopter, eg Iroquois-class destroyer
- DDG: area air defence - guided missile
- G: destroyer - World War II era (retired, included Tribal class and G and H classes)
- H: escort destroyer - World War II era (retired, included Clemson and G and H classes)
- I: destroyer - World War II era (retired)< Examples included: HMCS St. Francis (I93), HMCS Annapolis (I04), HMCS Caldwell (I20)
- R: destroyer (post World War II retired, was also used for a carrier) World War II destroyer examples included: HMCS Algonquin (R17) - V class and HMCS Crescent (R16) - C class

== Frigates ==
- F: frigate
- FFE: escort frigate (post World War II; used for Prestonian-class frigate, retired)
- FFH: multi-role patrol frigate - helicopter eg Halifax-class frigate

== Minesweepers ==
- J: minesweeper (retired, used for World War II era Fundy, Bangor, and Algerine-class minesweepers)
- MCB: post World War II minesweeper (retired) used for Bay-class minesweeper
- MSA: Mine Sweeper Auxiliary: Anticosti-class minesweeper (in use 1989–2000, retired)
- MM: Mechanical Minesweeper - more recently known as coastal defence vessels such as Kingston-class coastal defence vessel

== Submarines ==
- CC: World War I era gas powered submarines
- CH: World War I era diesel-electric submarines
- S: Submarine (retired Cold War era diesel electric: last used by Oberon-class submarines)
- SS: Submarine (retired, used for US built Balao (1961–1969) and Tench (1968–1974)-class vessels)
- SSK: Hunter-Killer Submarine or long range submarines. Eg Victoria-class submarines

== Patrol ==
- AOPV: Arctic and Offshore Patrol Vessel
