= CGS C.D. Howe =

Canadian Arctic patrol vessel

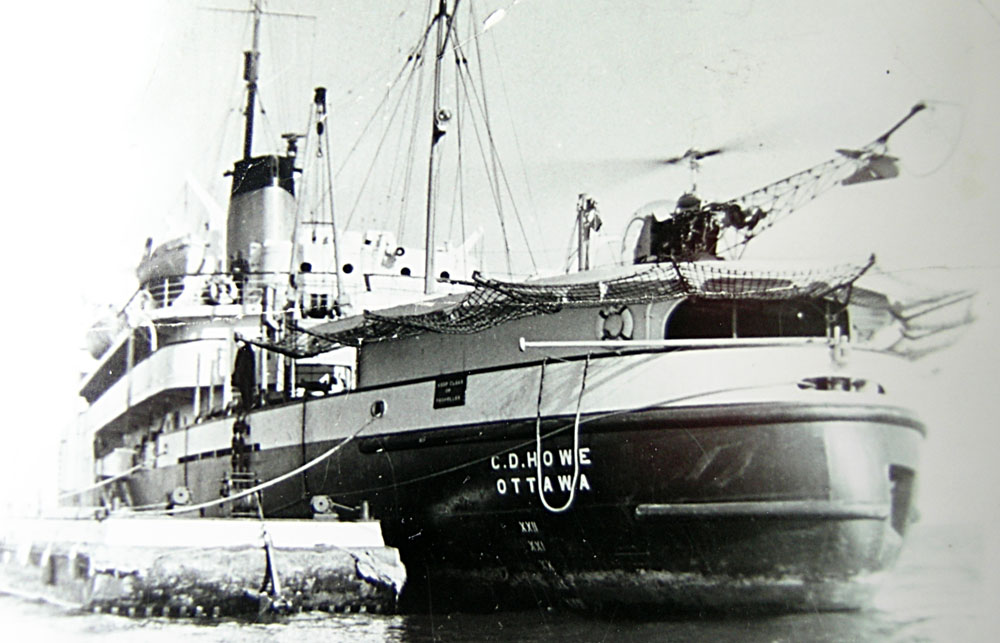
- C.D. Howe

History

Canada
- Name: C.D. Howe
- Namesake: C.D. Howe
- Operator: Department of Transport Canada; Canadian Coast Guard
- Port of registry: Ottawa
- Builder: Davie Shipbuilding, Lauzon
- Yard number: 588
- Launched: 7 September 1949
- Completed: June 1950
- In service: 1950
- Out of service: 1969
- Home port: Quebec City
- Identification: IMO number: 5056262
- Fate: Broken up, 1975

General characteristics
- Type: Arctic patrol vessel
- Tonnage: 3,628 GRT; 2,205 DWT
- Displacement: 3,620 long tons (3,680 t) standard; 5,125 long tons (5,207 t) fully loaded
- Length: 295 ft (89.9 m) oa; 276 ft (84.1 m) pp
- Beam: 50 ft (15.2 m)
- Draught: 18 1/2 ft (5.6 m)
- Propulsion: Uniflow steam engine, 2 screws; 4,000 ihp (3,000 kW)
- Speed: 13.5 knots (25.0 km/h; 15.5 mph) maximum
- Range: 10,000 nmi (19,000 km; 12,000 mi)
- Complement: 58
- Aircraft carried: 1 × helicopter
- Aviation facilities: Helicopter deck + hangar

CGS C.D. Howe (Note: CGS stands for Canadian Government Ship and CCGS stands for Canadian Coast Guard Ship.) was a Canadian Arctic patrol vessel tasked with controversial missions that served first with the Department of Transport, then the Canadian Coast Guard. Conceived as a way to make Canada's presence in the Arctic more visible, C.D. Howe entered service in 1950. The ship would make an annual voyage to Canada's north in the summer months, visiting remote communities to resupply them and to provide medical and dental services. The patrol vessel would sometimes remove members of Aboriginal communities to the south for further treatment. The ship was also involved in a forced resettlement of Inuit families in the High Arctic. During winter months, C.D. Howe provided services in the Gulf of St. Lawrence. In 1962, the ship joined the Canadian Coast Guard and was given the new prefix CCGS. C.D. Howe was deemed obsolete in 1969 and taken out of service. In 1970 the vessel was sold, becoming an accommodation vessel in Greenland before being broken up for scrap in 1975.

== Description ==
C.D. Howe was designed to be a multi-purpose vessel capable of navigating in Arctic waters. The ship was capable of icebreaking and was equipped for meteorological and oceanographic survey missions along with acting as a hospital ship. The vessel was designed to be a potential naval auxiliary in times of war. The ship's hull was of streamlined design, reinforced for service in Arctic waters. C.D. Howe was 276 feet (84.1 m) long between perpendiculars and 295 feet (89.9 m) long overall with a beam of 50 feet (15.2 m) and a maximum draught of 18 1/2 feet (5.6 m). The vessel had a standard displacement of 3,620 long tons (3,680 t) and fully loaded displacement of 5,125 long tons (5,207 t). The ship had a tonnage of 3,628 gross register tons (GRT) and 2,205 tons deadweight (DWT).

The ship was powered by a Skinner uniflow steam engine rated at 4,000 indicated horsepower (3,000 kW) driving two screws. The uniflow engine was considered superior to steam and diesel engines at the time. This gave C.D. Howe a maximum speed of 13.5 knots (25.0 km/h; 15.5 mph). The vessel had a cruising speed of 12 knots (22 km/h; 14 mph) and a range of 10,000 nautical miles (19,000 km; 12,000 mi) with 50% fuel reserve. The crane situated forward had a lifting capacity of 30,000 pounds (14,000 kg). The vessel had a complement of 58 and accommodation for 88 passengers. C.D. Howe was equipped with a helicopter deck for use by helicopters, the first in government service outside of the Royal Canadian Navy. The ship had a hangar added later. On its initial voyage, C.D. Howe embarked a Sikorsky S-51 helicopter for trials. The following year, the ship embarked a smaller Bell 47 helicopter for ice reconnaissance use.

== Service history ==
C.D. Howe was ordered by the Canadian government as part of their efforts to create a visible Canadian presence in the Arctic along with filling the medical void left in the north following the loss of CGS Nascopie. C.D. Howe was the second vessel in the postwar government construction program. Constructed by Davie Shipbuilding at their yard in Lauzon, Quebec with the yard number 588, C.D. Howe was launched on 7 September 1949 and completed in June 1950. Named for a former Canadian Minister of Transport, the vessel entered service with the Department of Transport's fleet in 1950. The ship was based at Quebec City.

During summer months, C.D. Howe made an annual voyage to the Eastern Arctic. During winter months, C.D. Howe performed icebreaking operations in the Gulf of St. Lawrence. The vessel was also used to train Canadian Coast Guard College cadets. The ship's annual voyage to the Eastern Arctic consisted of resupplying northern settlements, activating navigation aids in the north and providing medical and dental services to remote communities. C.D. Howe carried personnel from the Departments of Natural Resources and Northern Affairs along with members of the Royal Canadian Mounted Police while performing its duties. The annual trip would take the vessel to northern Labrador, along the south and east coasts of Baffin Island and stopping at Ellesmere Island. C.D. Howe operated as a hospital ship, carrying two doctors, two dentists and two nurses while travelling through the Arctic. The ship stopped at remote Aboriginal communities and provided medical services to the inhabitants, while also screening them for signs of tuberculosis (TB). This was so prevalent that government administrators called the vessel the Shakespeare ship for the gallows-humour pun "TB or not TB".

Examinations and treatments were at times performed against the will of the inhabitants, with the vessel forcibly removing those Aboriginals who were considered by the medical professionals aboard to need further care. The forcible removal of some of those patients, sometimes without warning to family members, caused distress among the remote populations, causing some to flee the sight of the ship upon its arrival in Aboriginal communities. As part of Canada's attempt to assert sovereignty over its Arctic territory, C.D. Howe, along with the icebreaker CGS D'Iberville, relocated Inuit that had been removed from their settlement at Port Harrison to new communities at Resolute and Grise Fiord in August and September 1953. In 1962, C.D. Howe, along with the rest of the Department of Transport's maritime fleet, was transferred to the newly created Canadian Coast Guard and the vessel was given the new prefix CCGS.

The ship made its final Arctic voyage in 1969. In 1970, C.D. Howe was taken out of service after air transportation and communication made the ship redundant. The ship was sold to Marine Salvage Ltd and registered in Ottawa. The vessel was resold in 1971 to Vestgron Mines Ltd and registered in Ottawa for use as an accommodation ship for workers at the Black Angel Mine in Maamorilik, Greenland. The ship was sold again in 1974 to Windward Sg Co Ltd and registered in Panama. On 1 July 1975 the ship was sold for scrap to Desguaces Condal and broken up in Barcelona, Spain.

== Sources ==
- Blackman, Raymond V. B., ed. (1953). Jane's Fighting Ships 1953–54. London: Sampson, Low and Marston. OCLC 913556389.
- Damas, David (2004). Arctic Migrants/Arctic Villagers: The Transformation of Inuit Settlement in the Central Arctic. Montreal-Kingston, Ontario: McGill-Queen's Press. ISBN 978-0-7735-2405-7.
- Maginley, Charles D. (2003). The Canadian Coast Guard 1962–2002. St. Catharines, Ontario: Vanwell Publishing Limited. ISBN 1-55125-075-6.
- Maginley, Charles D. & Collin, Bernard (2001). The Ships of Canada's Marine Services. St. Catharines, Ontario: Vanwell Publishing Limited. ISBN 1-55125-070-5.
- McGrath, Melanie (2009). The Long Exile: A Tale of Inuit Betrayal and Survival in the High Arctic. Knopf Doubleday. ISBN 9780307537867 – via Google Books.
- Stern, Pamela R. (2010). Daily Life of the Inuit. Santa Barbara, California: Greenwood Press. ISBN 978-0-313-36311-5.
- Waldram, James B.; Herring, D. Ann & Young, T. Kue (2006). Aboriginal Health in Canada: Historical, Cultural, and Epidemiological Perspectives (Second ed.). Toronto: University of Toronto Press. ISBN 978-0-8020-8579-5.
