= CCGS D'Iberville =

Canadian Coast Guard icebreaker vessel

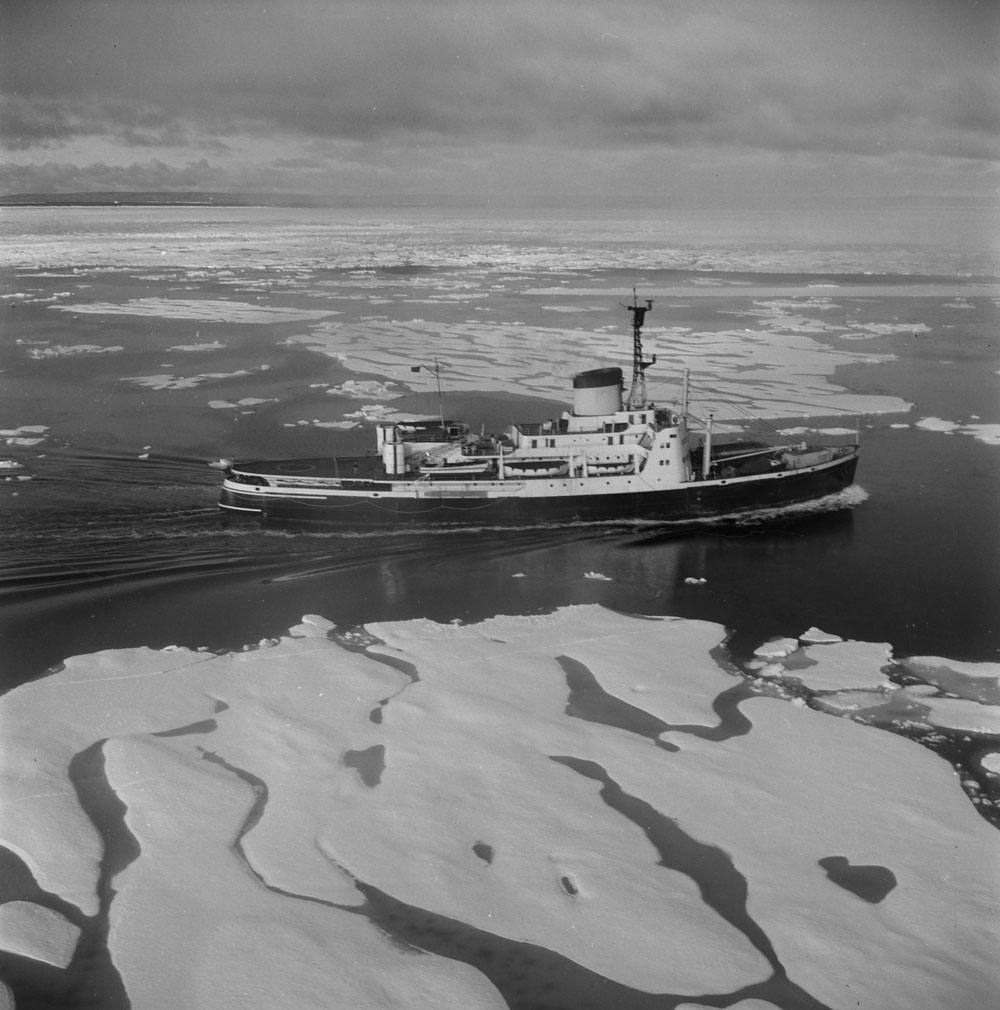
- CGS D'Iberville underway in the Arctic, 1957

History

Canada
- Name: D'Iberville
- Namesake: Pierre Le Moyne d'Iberville
- Operator: Department of Transport Marine Service; Canadian Coast Guard
- Builder: Davie Shipbuilding, Lauzon
- Yard number: 590
- Launched: 12 June 1952
- Commissioned: May 1953
- Decommissioned: 1983
- Renamed: Phillip O'Hara 1984; D'Iberville 1988
- Stricken: 1983
- Home port: CCG Base Quebec City
- Identification: IMO number: 5083734
- Fate: Scrapped in Kaohsiung in 1989

General characteristics
- Type: Medium icebreaker
- Tonnage: 5,678 GRT; 3,600 DWT
- Displacement: 9,930 long tons (10,090 t)
- Length: 310 ft (94 m)
- Beam: 67 ft (20 m)
- Draught: 30 ft (9.1 m)
- Propulsion: 2 × uniflow steam engines, 2 screws; 10,800 hp (8,100 kW)
- Speed: 15 knots (28 km/h)
- Aircraft carried: 1 helicopter
- Aviation facilities: Hangar and flight deck

CCGS D'Iberville (Note: CCGS stands for Canadian Coast Guard Ship) was a Canadian Coast Guard icebreaker that was in service from 1952 to 1983 and was Canada's first modern icebreaker. The ship commissioned as CGS D'Iberville for the Department of Transport's Marine Service, using the prefix "Canadian Government Ship", D'Iberville was transferred into the newly-created Canadian Coast Guard in 1962. When launched, she was the largest icebreaker in use by Canada post-World War II until CCGS John A. Macdonald was put in service. In 1984, the icebreaker was renamed Phillip O'Hara before returning to her old name in 1988. In 1989 the vessel was sold for scrap and broken up at Kaohsiung, Taiwan.

== Design and description ==
D'Iberville was 310 feet (94 m) long overall with a beam of 67 feet (20 m) and a draught of 30 feet (9.1 m). The icebreaker had a fully loaded displacement of 9,930 long tons (10,090 t), a gross register tonnage (GRT) of 5,678 and a deadweight tonnage (DWT) of 3,600. The ship was propelled by two screws powered by two six-cylinder Skinner uniflow steam engines creating 10,800 indicated horsepower (8,100 kW). This gave the ship a maximum speed of 15 knots (28 km/h). The ship had a hangar as part of the superstructure that could hold two Bell 47 helicopters and a flight deck over the stern of the ship, but usually only operated one helicopter.

== Service history ==
The icebreaker was constructed by Davie Shipbuilding at their yard in Lauzon, Quebec, with the yard number 590 and was launched on 12 June 1952. The vessel entered into service with the Department of Transport's Marine Service as CGS D'Iberville in May 1953, named for the French explorer Pierre Le Moyne d'Iberville. Upon completion, D'Iberville became Canada's first modern icebreaker. Following completion of her sea trials, D'Iberville sailed to England as part of Canada's representation at Queen Elizabeth II's coronation review along with warships from the Royal Canadian Navy. The ship was based at Quebec City, Quebec and saw service in the St. Lawrence River and Gulf of St. Lawrence.

In 1953, on the icebreaker's first Arctic voyage, D'Iberville helped establish the Royal Canadian Mounted Police post at Alexandria Fjord on Ellesmere Island. That year, D'Iberville and the Arctic patrol vessel C.D. Howe participated in the controversial forced resettlement of Inuit families from Port Harrison in Northern Quebec to Ellesmere Island. On 29 April 1959, the Saint Lawrence Seaway was opened for the first time and D'Iberville and CGS Montcalm were the first ships to transit the lock at Saint-Lambert, Quebec. In 1962, like all icebreaking vessels of the Department of Transport's Marine Service, she was transferred to the newly created Canadian Coast Guard.

In 1972, D'Iberville was one of three icebreaking escorts for a convoy of cargo ships travelling to Mokka Fjord and Eureka. This was the largest convoy to travel that far north into Canada's Arctic. In 1976, in conjunction with CCGS Louis S. St-Laurent, D'Iberville travelled into the Northwest Passage to aid CCGS J.E. Bernier after the small icebreaker damaged both her propellers. In 1981, D'Iberville made her last Arctic voyage. The ship was decommissioned in 1983. The vessel was laid up first at Quebec City, then at Sorel. Renamed Phillip O'Hara in 1984 and back to D'Iberville in 1988, the icebreaker was sold for scrap in 1989 and broken up at Kaoshiung, Taiwan.
