= List of shipwrecks in May 1881 =

The list of shipwrecks in May 1881 includes ships sunk, foundered, grounded, or otherwise lost during May 1881.

== 2 May ==
List of shipwrecks: 2 May 1881
Ship	State	Description
Unnamed	Flag unknown	The steamship caught fire and sank in the Atlantic Ocean (37°48′N 9°14′W). Witnessed by the steamship Saga (Norway), which found no sign of survivors.

== 3 May ==
List of shipwrecks: 3 May 1881
Ship	State	Description
Aldebaran	Denmark	The schooner ran aground on the Goodwin Sands, Kent, United Kingdom. She was refloated with assistance from a tug and the Ramsgate Lifeboat and taken in to Ramsgate, Kent.
Catherine	United Kingdom	The fishing smack was driven at Sea Palling, Norfolk. Her crew were rescued by the Palling Lifeboat. She was on a voyage from Texel, North Holland, Netherlands to Ramsgate.

== 5 May ==
List of shipwrecks: 5 May 1881
Ship	State	Description
Ellen Haworth	United Kingdom	The schooner was driven ashore and wrecked in the Ness of Duncansby, Caithness. Her crew were rescued. She was on a voyage from Runcorn, Cheshire to Newcastle upon Tyne, Northumberland.
Ivy Home	United Kingdom	The steamship foundered off the Butt of Lewis, Outer Hebrides. Her crew were rescued by a fishing smack. She was on a voyage from Sunderland, County Durham to Dublin.

== 6 May ==
List of shipwrecks: 6 May 1881
Ship	State	Description
Alicia	United Kingdom	The schooner collided with the steamship Bucentaur (United Kingdom and sank in the English Channel off The Lizard, Cornwall with the loss of a crew member. Survivors were rescued by Bucentaur.
Prosperity	United Kingdom	The schooner ran aground on the Brambles, in the Solent. She was on a voyage from London to Fleetwood, Lancashire. She was refloated and resumed her voyage.
St. Helena	United Kingdom	The barque was abandoned in the Atlantic Ocean (46°20′N 36°50′W). Her crew were rescued by the steamship Hansa (Germany).

== 7 May ==
List of shipwrecks: 7 May 1881
Ship	State	Description
Amicitia	Germany	The schooner foundered off Domesnes, Russia. Her crew were rescued by Solide (Flag unknown).
Ben Lomond	United Kingdom	The steamship collided with the steamship Naworth Castle (United Kingdom) at Copenhagen, Denmark and was beached. Ben Lomond was on a voyage from New Orleans, Louisiana, United States to Stettin, Germany. She was refloated on 9 May and taken in to Copenhagen for repairs.
Culmore	United Kingdom	The steamship struck the Crim Rocks, near the Bishop Rock, Isles of Scilly and foundered. The captain and three of the crew lost their lives. She was on a voyage from Valencia, Spain to Liverpool, Lancashire.
Felicity	United Kingdom	The brig was driven ashore and wrecked on Skagen, Denmark. She was on a voyage from Hartlepool, county Durham to Stockholm, Sweden.
Hegir	Sweden	The steamship ran aground at Maassluis, South Holland, Netherlands. She was on a voyage from Rotterdam, South Holland to Gothenburg. She was refloated and put back to Rotterdam for repairs.
Marseilles	United Kingdom	The steamship ran aground at Berville-sur-Mer, Eure, France. All 120 people on board were rescued. She was on a voyage from Dieppe, Seine-Inférieure, France to Newhaven, Sussex. She was refloated and put back to Dieppe.
Redland	United Kingdom	The steamship was driven ashore at Port Eynon Point, Glamorgan. She was refloated.

== 8 May ==
List of shipwrecks: 8 May 1881
Ship	State	Description
Laura Gillies	United Kingdom	The steamship ran aground in the Gironde. She was refloated and resumed her voyage.

== 9 May ==
List of shipwrecks: 9 May 1881
Ship	State	Description
Gananoque	United Kingdom	The ship was crushed by ice off the Birds Rocks and was abandoned by her crew. She was on a voyage from Belfast, County Antrim to Miramichi, New Brunswick, Canada.

== 10 May ==
List of shipwrecks: 10 May 1881
Ship	State	Description
Gananoque	United Kingdom	The barque collided with an iceberg in the Gulf of St. Lawrence four miles (6.4 km) off the Bird Rocks in the Magdalen Islands, Nova Scotia, Canada and sank. Her crew landed on Bird Rocks; they were rescued on 12 May.

== 11 May ==
List of shipwrecks: 11 May 1881
Ship	State	Description
Milanese	United Kingdom	The steamship collided with the steamship Asia (United Kingdom) in the River Thames and was beached near Gravesend, Kent. Milanese was on a voyage from Burriana, Spain to London.
Trinidad	United States	During a voyage from Port Huron, Michigan, to Milwaukee, Wisconsin, with a cargo of coal, the 140-foot (43 m) schooner sank suddenly in 270 feet (82 m) of water in Lake Michigan near Algoma, Wisconsin, with no loss of human life, although the ship's mascot, a large Newfoundland dog, died in the sinking. The crew abandoned ship in a yawl and arrived safely at Algoma. The virtually intact wreck was discovered in July 2023.

== 14 May ==
List of shipwrecks: 14 May 1881
Ship	State	Description
Jane Jones	United Kingdom	The schooner sank in Carnarvon Bay 6 nautical miles (11 km) off Porthdinllaen Point, Caernarfonshire. Her crew were rescued. She was on a voyage from Swansea, Glamorgan to Caernarfon.

== 16 May ==
List of shipwrecks: 16 May 1881
Ship	State	Description
Cornelia	Norway	The barque was abandoned in the Atlantic Ocean. Her crew were rescued by Cambrian Prince (United Kingdom). Cornelia was on a voyage from Southampton, Hampshire, United Kingdom to Halifax, Nova Scotia, Canada.
Maria	United Kingdom	The ship ran aground on the Middle Bank, in the Larne Lough.
Unnamed	Flag unknown	The ship caught fire and exploded off Heligoland, witnessed by the smack Fairy (United Kingdom).

== 17 May ==
List of shipwrecks: 17 May 1881
Ship	State	Description
Unnamed	Flag unknown	The steamship ran aground on the Nore.

== 18 May ==
List of shipwrecks: 18 May 1881
Ship	State	Description
Norval	United Kingdom	The brig was run down by an unidentified screw steamer; the master was drowned, but crew were rescued.
Resucitado	Portugal	The schooner collided with the steamship Euphrate (France) and sank. Her crew were rescued by Euphrate.
Unnamed	Flag unknown	The steamship ran aground on the Goodwin Sands, Kent, United Kingdom.

== 19 May ==
List of shipwrecks: 19 May 1881
Ship	State	Description
Cito	Norway	The barque was abandoned in the Atlantic Ocean (34°42′N 73°21′W). She was on a voyage from Wilmington, Delaware to Rotterdam, South Holland, Netherlands and/or Hamburg, Germany. She was discovered on 22 May by Colonist (Norway), which put four crew aboard with the intention of taking her to a port. Cito arrived at Plymouth, Devon, United Kingdom on 3 July.
Eurynome	United Kingdom	The ship departed from Geelong, Victoria for Havre de Grâce, Seine-Inférieure, France. No further trace, reported overdue.

== 20 May ==
List of shipwrecks: 20 May 1881
Ship	State	Description
A. Strong	United Kingdom	The steamship ran aground on the Shipwash Sand, in the North Sea off the coast of Sussex. She was refloated with the assistance of a tug and resumed her voyage.
Emma	Germany	The brig was driven ashore. She was refloated and towed in to Whitby, Yorkshire, United Kingdom.
Flora	Norway	The barque was driven ashore on the Isle of Arran, Inner Hebrides, United Kingdom. She was refloated the next day and taken in to Lamlash, Isle of Arran.
Reine des Flots	France	The ship ran aground at Newport, Monmouthshire and sprang a severe leak.

== 21 May ==
List of shipwrecks: 21 May 1881
Ship	State	Description
Duchess of Lanchester	United Kingdom	The ship was driven ashore on the Holy Island, in the Firth of Clyde.

== 23 May ==
List of shipwrecks: 23 May 1881
Ship	State	Description
Ellen Vair	United Kingdom	The schooner collided with Gertrude (United Kingdom) and was abandoned in the English Channel 6 nautical miles (11 km) off The Lizard, Cornwall. Her crew were rescued by Gertrude.

== 24 May ==
List of shipwrecks: 24 May 1881
Ship	State	Description
Victoria	Canada	While carrying passengers back to downtown London during Victoria Day celebrations, the steamboat sank in the Thames River, due to overcrowding causing her to strike a rock in the shallow river and ultimately capsize. Approximately 182 people drowned out of a total of 600 on board.

== 25 May ==
List of shipwrecks: 25 May 1881
Ship	State	Description
Aimo	Sweden	The ship collided with Sleipner (Norway) at Gothenburg and was severely damaged. Aimo was on a voyage from Slite to Grimsby, Lincolnshire, United Kingdom.
Grangemouth	United Kingdom	The steamship was driven ashore on Fidra, Lothian. She was on a voyage from Rotterdam, South Holland, Netherlands to Grangemouth, Stirlingshire. She was refloated and taken in to Leith, Lothian waterlogged at the bow.

== 26 May ==
List of shipwrecks: 26 May 1881
Ship	State	Description
Vedremo	Italy	The barque was destroyed by fire at Mobile, Alabama, United States.

== 27 May ==
List of shipwrecks: 27 May 1881
Ship	State	Description
Huguenot	United States	The ship struck a rock in the Allor Straits and foundered. Her crew were rescued.

== 28 May ==
List of shipwrecks: 28 May 1881
Ship	State	Description
Fritz	Germany	The barque was driven ashore at Littlestone-on-Sea, Kent, United Kingdom. She was on a voyage from Danzig to Saint-Nazaire, Loire-Inférieure, France.
Mary Hough	United Kingdom	The steamship collided in thick fog with the steamship Castilian (United Kingdom) in the River Mersey. Taken under tow by the steam tug Hercules (United Kingdom), a few minutes later, she was run into by the mail steamship African (United Kingdom) and sank. Her crew took to the boats and landed at Liverpool. Mary Hough was refloated on 10 June and beached at Egremont, Lancashire.

== 29 May ==
List of shipwrecks: 29 May 1881
Ship	State	Description
Darent, and an unnamed vessel	United Kingdom; Greece	The steamship Darent and a barque were run into by the steamship Southella at Sulina, Romania. Both vessels were severely damaged.
Dunvegan Castle	United Kingdom	The steamship ran aground at Maughold Head, Isle of Man. She was on a voyage from Liverpool, Lancashire to Larne, County Antrim. She was refloated and taken in to Barrow-in-Furness, Lancashire waterlogged at the bows. She was placed under repair.
Lord Alfred Paget	United Kingdom	The steamship collided with the steamship Garrison (United Kingdom) off Whitby, Yorkshire and was severely damaged. Her fourteen crew abandoned her, but one crew member was lost reboarding her. Lord Alfred Paget was on a voyage from South Shields, County Durham to London. She put in to Hartlepool, County Durham.
Victoria	Canada	The steamship capsized near London, Ontario with much loss of life.

== 30 May ==
List of shipwrecks: 30 May 1881
Ship	State	Description
Alfeo	Italy	The barque ran aground at Porto, Portugal. She was on a voyage from Porto to New York, United States. She was refloated and put back to Porto in a severely leaky condition.
Flora P. Stafford	United States	The ship collided with the steamship Haytian (United Kingdom) and was abandoned. Her crew were rescued by Haytian. Flora P. Stafford was on a voyage from Bordeaux, Gironde, France to the Hampton Roads, Virginia.
Pera	United Kingdom	The steamship was driven ashore in Duncansby Ness, Caithness. She was on a voyage from Montrose, Forfarshire to Liverpool, Lancashire.
Princess of Thule	United Kingdom	The ship was driven ashore and wrecked west of Rosehearty, Aberdeenshire. Her crew survived. She was on a voyage from Runcorn, Cheshire to Boddam, Aberdeenshire.

== 31 May ==
List of shipwrecks: 31 May 1881
Ship	State	Description
Queen of Nations	United Kingdom	The clipper was wrecked on Corrimal Beach, New South Wales with the loss of one life.

== Unknown date ==
List of shipwrecks: Unknown date in May 1881
Ship	State	Description
Adriano	Spain	The steamship collided with the steamship Unity (United Kingdom) and sank in the Mediterranean Sea.
Advance	New Zealand	The schooner ran aground and was damaged at Christchurch. She was on a voyage from Thames to Kaiapoi. She was refloated.
Ban Righ	United Kingdom	The schooner struck rocks at Barra, Outer Hebrides. She was refloated on 6 May and towed in to Stornoway, Isle of Lewis, Outer Hebrides by the steamship Dunbeath Castle (United Kingdom).
Bessy	United Kingdom	The Mersey Flat struck the pier and sank at Liverpool, Lancashire.
Cadigal	France	The steamship collided with a British steamship at Bilbao, Spain and was beached. She was on a voyage from Bilbao to Dunkirk, Nord.
Cearense	United Kingdom	The steamship ran aground in the Amazon River before 15 March. She was later refloated.
Cerere	United Kingdom	The ship was driven ashore at Fox River, Nova Scotia, Canada. She was on a voyage from Montreal, Quebec, Canada to Queenstown, County Cork.
Cito	United States	The ship was abandoned in the Atlantic Ocean. She was on a voyage from Philadelphia, Pennsylvania to Gibraltar.
Colombo	Canada	The steamship was driven ashore at Matane, Quebec. She was on a voyage from Sydney, Nova Scotia to Montreal. She was later refloated and taken in to port.
Elizabeth	France	The schooner was driven ashore at Cape Gatt, Spain.
Elpis	United Kingdom	The steamship ran aground at New Orleans, Louisiana, United States.
Emily Mare	United Kingdom	The Thames barge was run into by the steamship Hansa (Germany) at Blackwall, Middlesex and sank. Her crew survived.
Enoch Train	United Kingdom	The ship was driven ashore on the coast of Cuba. She was on a voyage from New Orleans to Liverpool. She was refloated and taken in to Havana, Cuba for repairs.
Hilda	United Kingdom	The yacht was driven ashore at Saltcoats, Ayrshire. She was on a voyage from Glasgow, Renfrewshire to Liverpool.
Isabel Craggs	United Kingdom	The ship caught fire at Charleston, South Carolina, United States. She was scuttled and the fire was extinguished.
John Geddie	United Kingdom	The barque was destroyed by fire in the Atlantic Ocean before 7 May. Her crew took to a boat; they were rescued by the brig Victoria (Sweden). John Geddie was on a voyage from Cardiff, Glamorgan to Montevideo, Uruguay.
Kong Oscar	Norway	The ship was driven ashore at Quebec City, Canada.
Larnax	United Kingdom	The steamship was driven ashore at Tangier, Nova Scotia.
Lizzie Stewart	United Kingdom	The steamship ran aground at the mouth of the Maas. She was on a voyage from Huelva, Spain to Amsterdam, North Holland, Netherlands. She was refloated with assistance.
Margaret	United Kingdom	The schooner collided with the steamship Puno (United Kingdom) and sank in the River Mersey. Her crew were rescued.
Merchant	Netherlands	The smack collided with the steamship Henry Scholefield (United Kingdom) and sank in the North Sea with the loss of a crew member. Survivors were rescued by Henry Scholefield.
Nelly	United Kingdom	The barque was abandoned in the Atlantic Ocean. She was on a voyage from Grimsby, Lincolnshire, United Kingdom to Quebec City.
Norma	Germany	The ship was abandoned in the Atlantic Ocean. Her crew were rescued.
North Sea	United Kingdom	The steamship ran aground on the South Sand, in the North Sea 2 nautical miles (3.7 km) off the coast of Fife.
Norwood	United Kingdom	The ship ran aground at New York. She was on a voyage from New York to Antwerp, Belgium. She was refloated.
Parisian	United Kingdom	The ship departed from San Francisco, California, United States for Liverpool. No further trace, reported overdue.
Polynesian	United Kingdom	The steamship ran aground at Quebec City. She was on a voyage from Montreal, Quebec to Quebec City. She was refloated and completed her voyage.
Prince Le-Boo	Canada	The ship caught fire at Saint John's, Newfoundland Colony and was severely damaged.
Royal Charley	Canada	The ship was wrecked at "Point Hollandes", Cuba. She was on a voyage from Havre de Grâce, Seine-Inférieure, France to New Orleans=.
Sarah James	United Kingdom	The schooner was driven ashore and wrecked at Cap de la Hague, Manche, France. She was on a voyage from Guernsey, Channel Islands to London.
Tropic	United States	The steamship was severely damaged by fire at Philadelphia.
Winslow	Norway	The barque was abandoned in the Atlantic Ocean before 25 May. Her crew were rescued.
