= HMCS Noranda =

History

Canada
- Name: Noranda
- Namesake: Rouyn-Noranda, Quebec
- Builder: Davie Shipbuilding, Lauzon
- Laid down: 27 December 1940
- Launched: 13 June 1941
- Commissioned: 15 May 1942
- Decommissioned: 28 August 1945
- Identification: Pennant number: J265
- Honours and awards: Gulf of St. Lawrence 1942, Atlantic 1943-45
- Fate: Sold 1962, Sank off Jamaica, May 1971 as yacht

General characteristics
- Class & type: Bangor-class minesweeper
- Displacement: 592 long tons (601 t)
- Length: 162 ft (49.4 m)
- Beam: 28 ft (8.5 m)
- Draught: 8.25 ft (2.51 m)
- Propulsion: 2 shafts, 9-cylinder diesel, 2,000 bhp (1,500 kW)
- Speed: 16 knots (30 km/h)
- Complement: 83
- Armament: 1 × QF 12-pounder 12 cwt naval gun; 1 × QF 2-pounder Mark VIII; 2 × QF 20 mm Oerlikon guns; 40 depth charges as escort

HMCS Noranda was a Canadian Bangor-class minesweeper built for the Royal Canadian Navy in 1940. She was launched on 13 June 1941 and escorted convoys for the rest of the war. After the war the minesweeper was refitted and was transferred to the Royal Canadian Mounted Police as Irvine. In 1962, the ship was sold and was turned into the yacht Miriana. Renamed Marijana and Viking L&R in 1969, the yacht sank in May 1971 off the coast of Jamaica.

== Design and description ==
The Bangor class was initially to be a scaled down minesweeper design of the Halcyon class in Royal Navy service. However, due to the difficulty procuring diesel engines led to the small number of the diesel version being completed. The ships displaced 592 long tons (601 t) standard and 690 long tons (701 t) fully loaded. They were 162 feet (49.4 m) long with a beam of 28 feet (8.5 m) and a draught of 8 feet 3 inches (2.51 m). However, the size of the ship led to criticisms of their being too cramped for magnetic or acoustic minesweeping gear. This may have been due to all the additions made during the war with the installation of ASDIC, radar and depth charges.

The Bangor class came in two versions. Noranda was of the diesel-powered version, being equipped with a 9-cylinder diesel engine driving two shafts that produced 2,000 brake horsepower (1,500 kW). This gave the ship a maximum speed of 16.5 knots (30.6 km/h). The vessels carried 65 long tons (66 t) of oil. The vessels had a complement of 6 officers and 77 ratings.

The Canadian diesel-powered Bangors were armed with a single quick-firing (QF) 12-pounder 12 cwt gun mounted forward. (Note: "Cwt" is the abbreviation for hundredweight, 20 cwt referring to the weight of the gun.) The ships were also fitted with a QF 2-pounder Mark VIII gun aft and were eventually fitted with single-mounted QF 20 mm Oerlikon guns on the bridge wings. Noranda was singular in having a single 20 mm gun in the aft mount. For those ships assigned to convoy duty, they were armed with two depth charge launchers and two chutes for the 40 depth charges they carried.

== Service history ==
Noranda was ordered as part of the 1940–41 building programme. The minesweeper's keel was laid down on 27 December 1940 by Davie Shipbuilding and Repairing Co. Ltd. at Lauzon, Quebec. The ship was launched on 13 June 1941 and commissioned into the Royal Canadian Navy at Quebec City on 15 May 1942.

Following work ups at Pictou, Nova Scotia, Noranda was assigned to Halifax Force, a local escort force operating out of Halifax, Nova Scotia. In February 1943, the minesweeper was reassigned to the Western Local Escort Force (WLEF), escorting convoys along the coast of North America. In June 1943, WLEF's escorts were placed in groups, with Noranda joining W-9. She remained with that unit until May 1944 when the ship transferred to Sydney Force, a local escort force operating out of Sydney, Nova Scotia.

Noranda underwent a major refit at Lunenburg, Nova Scotia from September to December 1944 before returning to service on 2 February 1945. The minesweeper briefly returned to Halifax Force before rejoining Sydney Force. The ship was paid off on 28 August 1945 at Halifax.

The minesweeper was transferred to the Royal Canadian Mounted Police (RCMP) on 28 August 1945 for service in their Marine Division and renamed Irvine in 1947. Irvine was stationed at Halifax until 1962. The RCMP sold the vessel in 1962 for use as a yacht and renamed Miriana. In 1969 the vessel was renamed Marijana and owned by Rainbow Import & Manufacturing. The vessel was sold again in 1969, this time to Dolphin Sg Co Ltd and renamed Viking L&R and registered in the Cayman Islands. In May 1971 the yacht foundered in Montego Bay, Jamaica. Her registry was deleted in the Cayman Islands in 1977.
