= HMCS Melville =

Bangor-class minesweeper

History

Canada
- Name: Melville
- Builder: Davie Shipbuilding, Lauzon
- Laid down: 17 December 1940
- Launched: 7 June 1941
- Commissioned: 4 December 1941
- Decommissioned: 18 August 1945
- Honours and awards: Atlantic 1942–45, Gulf of St. Lawrence 1944
- Fate: Transferred to Royal Canadian Mounted Police, 1946

Canada
- Name: Cygnus
- Owner: Royal Canadian Mounted Police
- Acquired: 1946
- In service: 1950
- Fate: Scrapped 1961

General characteristics
- Class & type: Bangor-class minesweeper
- Displacement: 592 long tons (601 t)
- Length: 162 ft (49 m)
- Beam: 28 ft (8.5 m)
- Draught: 8.25 ft (2.51 m)
- Propulsion: 2 shafts, 9-cylinder diesel, 2,000 bhp (1,500 kW)
- Speed: 16 knots (30 km/h; 18 mph)
- Complement: 83
- Armament: 1 × QF 12-pounder 12 cwt naval gun; 1 × QF 2-pounder Mark VIII; 2 × QF 20 mm Oerlikon guns; 40 depth charges as escort

HMCS Melville was a Bangor-class minesweeper built for the Royal Canadian Navy in 1940. The first diesel-engined Bangor-class vessel, Melville served in the Battle of the Atlantic during the Second World War. After the war, she was transferred to the Royal Canadian Mounted Police (RCMP) and renamed Cygnus and served until being broken up in 1961.

== Design and description ==
The Bangor class was initially to be a scaled down minesweeper design of the Halcyon class in Royal Navy service. However due to the difficulty procuring diesel engines led to the small number of the diesel version being completed. The ships displaced 592 long tons (601 t) standard and 690 long tons (700 t) fully loaded. They were 162 feet (49 m) long overall with a beam of 28 feet (8.5 m) and a draught of 8 feet 3 inches (2.51 m). However, the size of the ship led to criticisms of their being too cramped for magnetic or acoustic minesweeping gear. This may have been due to all the additions made during the war with the installation of ASDIC, radar and depth charges.

The Bangor class came in two versions. Melville was of the diesel-powered version, being equipped with a 9-cylinder diesel engine driving two shafts that produced 2,000 brake horsepower (1,500 kW). This gave the ship a maximum speed of 16.5 knots (30.6 km/h; 19.0 mph). The vessels carried 65 long tons (66 t) of oil. The vessels had a complement of 6 officers and 77 ratings.

Melville was singular among the diesel-powered Bangors by being armed with a single quick-firing (QF) 4-inch (102 mm)/40 calibre Mk IV gun mounted forward. (Note: The 40 calibre denotes the length of the gun. This means that the length of the gun barrel is 40 times the bore diameter.) Melville was also fitted with a QF 2-pounder Mark VIII gun aft and was eventually fitted with single-mounted QF 20 mm Oerlikon guns on the bridge wings. For those Bangors assigned to convoy duty, they were armed with two depth charge launchers and two chutes for the 40 depth charges they carried.

== Service history ==
Melville was ordered as part of the 1940–41 building programme. The minesweeper's keel was laid down on 17 December 1940 by Davie Shipbuilding at Lauzon, Quebec. The ship was launched on 7 June 1941 and commissioned into the Royal Canadian Navy at Quebec City with the pennant number J263 on 4 December later that year.

After performing her work ups, Melville was assigned to the Western Local Escort Force (WLEF). In May 1942, the minesweeper was reassigned to Shelburne Force, a local convoy escort force deploying out of Shelburne, Nova Scotia. In September, the vessel was reallocated to WLEF and remained with them until February 1943. On 3 February Melville began a major refit at Lunenburg which was eventually completed at Halifax on 6 June.

After the ship's return to service, Melville was assigned to Sydney Force, a local escort group that worked out of Sydney, Nova Scotia. The minesweeper remained with this unit until June 1945. The minesweeper was paid off on 18 August 1945 at Sydney.

The ship was handed over to the RCMP in 1946 for conversion to a fisheries patrol vessel. The ship emerged in 1950 as the 581 GRT Cygnus. The vessel remained in RCMP service until 1961 when she was sold for scrap and broken up.
