= HMCS Brockville =

Canadian Navy minesweeper during World War II

History

Canada
- Name: Brockville
- Namesake: Brockville, Ontario
- Builder: Marine Industries Limited, Sorel
- Laid down: 9 December 1940
- Launched: 20 June 1941
- Commissioned: 19 September 1942
- Decommissioned: 28 August 1945
- Identification: Pennant number: J270
- Recommissioned: 5 April 1951
- Decommissioned: 31 October 1958
- Identification: Pennant number: 283
- Honours and awards: Atlantic 1943–45, Gulf of St. Lawrence 1944.
- Fate: Broken up 1961
- Badge: Argent, a lion passant guardant gules, holding in his dexter paw a fleur-de-lis azure

General characteristics
- Class & type: Bangor-class minesweeper
- Displacement: 592 long tons (601 t)
- Length: 162 ft (49.4 m)
- Beam: 28 ft (8.5 m)
- Draught: 8.25 ft (2.51 m)
- Propulsion: 2 shafts, 9-cylinder diesel, 2,000 bhp (1,500 kW)
- Speed: 16.5 knots (31 km/h)
- Complement: 83
- Armament: 1 × QF 12-pounder 12 cwt naval gun; 1 × QF 2-pounder Mark VIII; 2 × QF 20 mm Oerlikon guns; 40 depth charges as escort

HMCS Brockville was a Bangor-class minesweeper that served with the Royal Canadian Navy during the Second World War. She was used as a convoy escort in the Battle of the Atlantic and the Battle of the St. Lawrence. Following the war, the vessel was transferred to the Royal Canadian Mounted Police and renamed Macleod. After five years service with them, the ship was reacquired the Royal Canadian Navy and recommissioned. She remained in service until 1958.

== Design and construction ==
=== Design ===
The Bangor class was initially to be a scaled down minesweeper design of the Halcyon class in Royal Navy service. However, due to the difficulty procuring diesel engines led to the small number of the diesel version being completed. The ships displaced 592 long tons (601 t) standard and 690 long tons (700 t) fully loaded. They were 162 feet (49.4 m) long with a beam of 28 feet (8.5 m) and a draught of 8 feet 3 inches (2.51 m). However, the size of the ship led to criticisms of their being too cramped for magnetic or acoustic minesweeping gear. This may have been due to all the additions made during the war with the installation of ASDIC, radar and depth charges.

The Bangor class came in two versions. Brockville was of the diesel-powered version, being equipped with a 9-cylinder diesel engine driving two shafts that produced 2,000 brake horsepower (1,500 kW). This gave the ship a maximum speed of 16.5 knots (30.6 km/h). The vessels carried 65 long tons (66 t) of oil. The vessels had a complement of 6 officers and 77 ratings.

The Canadian diesel-powered Bangors were armed with a single quick-firing (QF) 12-pounder 12 cwt gun mounted forward. (Note: "Cwt" is the abbreviation for hundredweight, 20 cwt referring to the weight of the gun.) Initially the design called for a 4-inch (102 mm) gun, however these were replaced with 12-pounder guns. The ships were also fitted with a QF 2-pounder Mark VIII gun aft and were eventually fitted with single-mounted QF 20 mm Oerlikon guns on the bridge wings. For those ships assigned to convoy duty, they were armed with two depth charge launchers and two chutes to launch the 40 depth charges they carried.

=== Order and construction ===
Initially, Canada intended to produce more Fundy-class minesweepers, however, upon learning of the Bangor design from the Royal Navy, chose to build them instead. This decision was based on the Bangors oil-burning engines and their larger size and speed. However the lack of diesel manufacturing led to smaller numbers being built and delays in the acquisition of diesel engines led to delays between launching and completion.

Brockville was ordered as part of the 1940–41 Bangor-class program. The ship was laid down on 9 December 1940 by Marine Industries Limited at Sorel and launched 20 June 1941. She was commissioned into the Royal Canadian Navy on 19 September 1942 at Sorel. She was named for the town of Brockville, Ontario.

== Service history ==
=== War service ===
On 20 October 1942, Brockville arrived at Halifax, Nova Scotia. While en route to Halifax, the ship grounded near Rimouski, Quebec and required two weeks repairs upon arrival. After working up, she was assigned to the Western Local Escort Force (WLEF), escorting convoys, before transferring to Halifax Force.

In March 1943, Brockville returned to WLEF. In June 1943, the force was divided up into escort groups with Brockville joining group W-3. In August/September, the ship underwent a refit at Dalhousie, New Brunswick. She remained with the group until May 1944, when the minesweeper was transferred to Sydney Force. The vessel underwent a second refit at Lunenburg, Nova Scotia in 1944. She would remain a part of this group until June 1945 when the ship was assigned to various tasks based out of Halifax.

=== Postwar service ===
On 28 August 1945, Brockville was transferred to the Royal Canadian Mounted Police (RCMP) Marine Service. Upon transfer, the ship was renamed Macleod for former commissioner of the RCMP James Macleod. Macleod served on the east coast until 1 July 1950 when she was returned to the Royal Canadian Navy where she was returned to her old name.

Brockville was recommissioned into the Royal Canadian Navy on 5 April 1951. She underwent modernization at Lauzon, Quebec. During her modernization, the 12-pounder gun was removed and replaced with a Bofors 40 mm gun and a Hedgehog anti-submarine mortar was installed. In 1952, the ship was assigned to Sydney, Nova Scotia as tender to HMCS Scotian and was used for seasonal training exercises on the Great Lakes in 1954. In October 1954, Brockville transferred to Esquimalt, British Columbia with Digby and Jonquiere. On 4 January 1955, Brockville, Digby and Cordova formed the Second Canadian Reserve Squadron for training purposes at Esquimalt. On 12 December 1956, she was paid off into the reserve at Esquimalt. On 29 August 1958, the ship was recommissioned for passage to Halifax where it was planned to convert her to a mobile deperming vessel. However this conversion was cancelled and she was paid off for the final time on 31 October 1958. She was sold for scrap and broken up in 1961.

== See also ==
- List of ships of the Canadian Navy
