= CCGS J.E. Bernier =

Canadian Coast Guard icebreaker, 1967–2005

History

Canada
- Name: J.E. Bernier
- Namesake: Joseph-Elzéar Bernier
- Owner: Government of Canada
- Operator: Canadian Coast Guard
- Port of registry: Ottawa
- Builder: Davie Shipbuilding, Lauzon
- Yard number: 659
- Launched: 28 April 1967
- Commissioned: August 1967
- Decommissioned: 2005
- Home port: CCG Base St. John's (Newfoundland and Labrador Region)
- Identification: IMO number: 6717851; Call sign: CGBT
- Fate: Sold 2006

General characteristics
- Type: Icebreaker
- Tonnage: 2,457.25 GRT; 704.63 NRT
- Displacement: 3,096 long tons (3,146 t)
- Length: 66.72 m (218.90 ft)
- Beam: 15 m (49.21 ft)
- Draught: 5.82 m (19.09 ft)
- Installed power: 4,250 bhp (3,170 kW)
- Propulsion: Diesel-electric (AC/AC); Two fixed-pitch propellers
- Speed: 13.3 knots (24.6 km/h)
- Range: 4,000 nmi (7,400 km) at 11 knots (20 km/h)
- Aircraft carried: 1 helicopter
- Aviation facilities: Flight deck

CCGS J.E. Bernier (Note: CCGS stands for Canadian Coast Guard Ship) was a Canadian Coast Guard medium Arctic icebreaker with a steel hull. The vessel was in service from 1967 to 2006. The ship was initially based at Quebec City but finished her career at St. John's. The ship was named for Joseph-Elzéar Bernier, captain of CGS Arctic which explored and monitored the eastern Arctic for the Government of Canada in the early 20th century. The vessel was sold in 2006 to private interests.

== Design and description ==
J.E. Bernier was 66.72 metres (218.90 ft) long overall with a beam of 15 metres (49.21 ft) and a draught of 5.82 metres (19.09 ft). The ship had a fully loaded displacement of 3,096 long tons (3,146 t), a gross register tonnage (GRT) of 2,457.25 and a net register tonnage (NRT) of 704.63. The ship was propelled by two screws each with a fixed-pitch propellers powered by a diesel-electric system (AC/AC) composed of four Fairbanks-Morse 8-cylinder diesel engines and four generators driving two motors that created 4,250 brake horsepower (3,170 kW). This gave the ship a maximum speed of 13.3 knots (24.6 km/h) but the vessel made 13.5 knots (25.0 km/h) during sea trials. The ship carried 512.00 m^{3} (112,620 imp gal) of diesel fuel and had a range of 4,000 nautical miles (7,400 km) at 11 knots (20 km/h). The vessel could operate one Bell 206L helicopter from a flight deck placed over the stern of the ship.

== Service history ==
The icebreaker was constructed by Davie Shipbuilding at their yard in Lauzon, Quebec with the yard number 659. J.E. Bernier was launched on 28 April 1967 and commissioned in August 1967. The ship was registered in Ottawa, Ontario and was initially based at Quebec City, Quebec.

In 1972, the ship was among the three icebreaking escorts for a convoy of seven cargo ships travelling to Mokka Fjord and Eureka. This was the largest convoy to sail that far north. In 1974, J.E. Bernier, with a Royal Canadian Mounted Police and Sûreté du Québec detachment on board, was sent to eject occupiers of a vessel that had gone aground on Île d'Orléans in the Saint Lawrence River. As the icebreaker came alongside the grounded ship, the illegal occupiers escaped over the stern and fled. In 1976, J.E. Bernier transited the Panama Canal to replace CCGS Camsell on the West Coast of Canada after Camsell was damaged. The icebreaker spent the summer working in the western Arctic and Beaufort Sea, during which the ship supported the research vessel CCGS Parizeau before severe conditions north of Alaska forced Parizeau to turn back. The icebreaker returned to Quebec City via the Northwest Passage, circumnavigating North America. In 1980, the icebreaker returned to the West Coast to replace Camsell again and to celebrate the 100th anniversary of the transfer of the Arctic archipelago to Canada from the United Kingdom. The ceremony was hosted by the Governor General of Canada Edward Schreyer aboard the icebreaker. The ship once again circumnavigated North America on her return to Quebec.

In June 1994, during the height of the Turbot War, a disagreement between Canada and the European Union (EU) over fishing rights on the Grand Banks, J.E. Bernier was used to ferry personnel and equipment from St. John's, Newfoundland and Labrador to Coast Guard vessels monitoring EU fishing fleets. In 1995, J.E. Bernier's home port was transferred to St. John's. The vessel was taken out of service in 2005 and transferred to Crown Assets Distribution and renamed 05 in May. The ship was sold in June 2006 to Midnight Marine Ltd of Newfoundland.

== See also ==
- Equipment of the Canadian Coast Guard
