= MV Caribou =

Former Marine Atlantic ferry

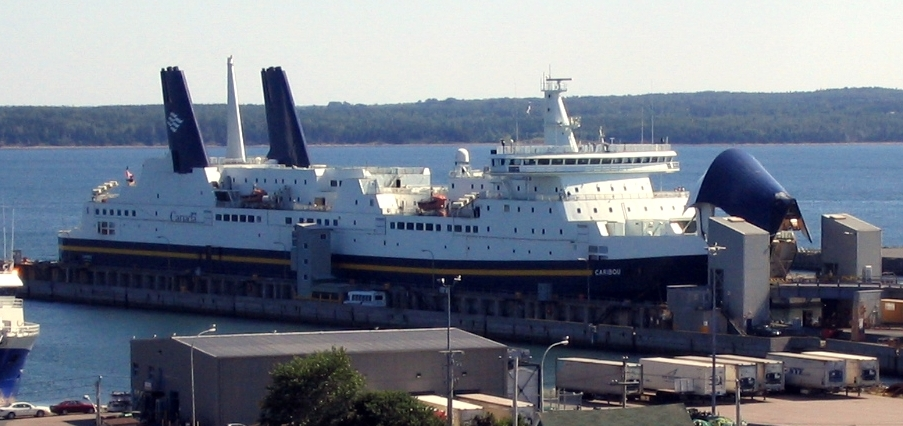
- Caribou at North Sydney

History
- Name: Caribou (1986–2011); Caribo (2011)
- Owner: Government of Canada
- Operator: Marine Atlantic
- Port of registry: St. John's
- Route: North Sydney, Nova Scotia - Channel-Port aux Basques, Newfoundland and Labrador
- Ordered: 1984
- Builder: MIL-Davie Shipbuilding, Lauzon
- Laid down: 1984
- Launched: 1985
- Completed: 1986
- In service: 1986–2010
- Identification: IMO number: 8301876
- Fate: Broken up in 2011

General characteristics (as built)
- Class & type: Gulfspan class icebreaking ropax ferry
- Tonnage: 27,213 GT; 3,662 DWT
- Length: 172.76 m (567 ft)
- Beam: 24.99 m (82 ft)
- Draught: 12.19 m (40 ft 0 in)
- Ramps: shore-based bi-level ramps
- Ice class: 1A Super
- Installed power: 4 × MaK 8-cylinder diesels; combined 20,600 kW
- Propulsion: 2 propellers; 2 bow thrusters; 2 stern thrusters
- Speed: 22 knots (41 km/h; 25 mph) (maximum); 15 knots (28 km/h; 17 mph) (service)
- Capacity: 1,200 passengers; 370 cars, 77 trucks; 1,800 m (5,906 ft) lane metres
- Crew: 108 (summer), 68 (winter)

MV Caribou was a Marine Atlantic passenger/vehicle ferry which operated between the islands of Newfoundland and Cape Breton in eastern Canada.

Caribou was named in memory of her predecessor the SS Caribou which was sunk off Port aux Basques by a German U-boat on October 14, 1942 with the loss of 137 passengers and crew.

Entering service in 1986, she was built by Versatile Davie in Lauzon, Quebec, and is specifically designed to traverse the 178 km (96 nmi) route across the Cabot Strait between North Sydney, Nova Scotia and Channel-Port aux Basques, Newfoundland and Labrador.

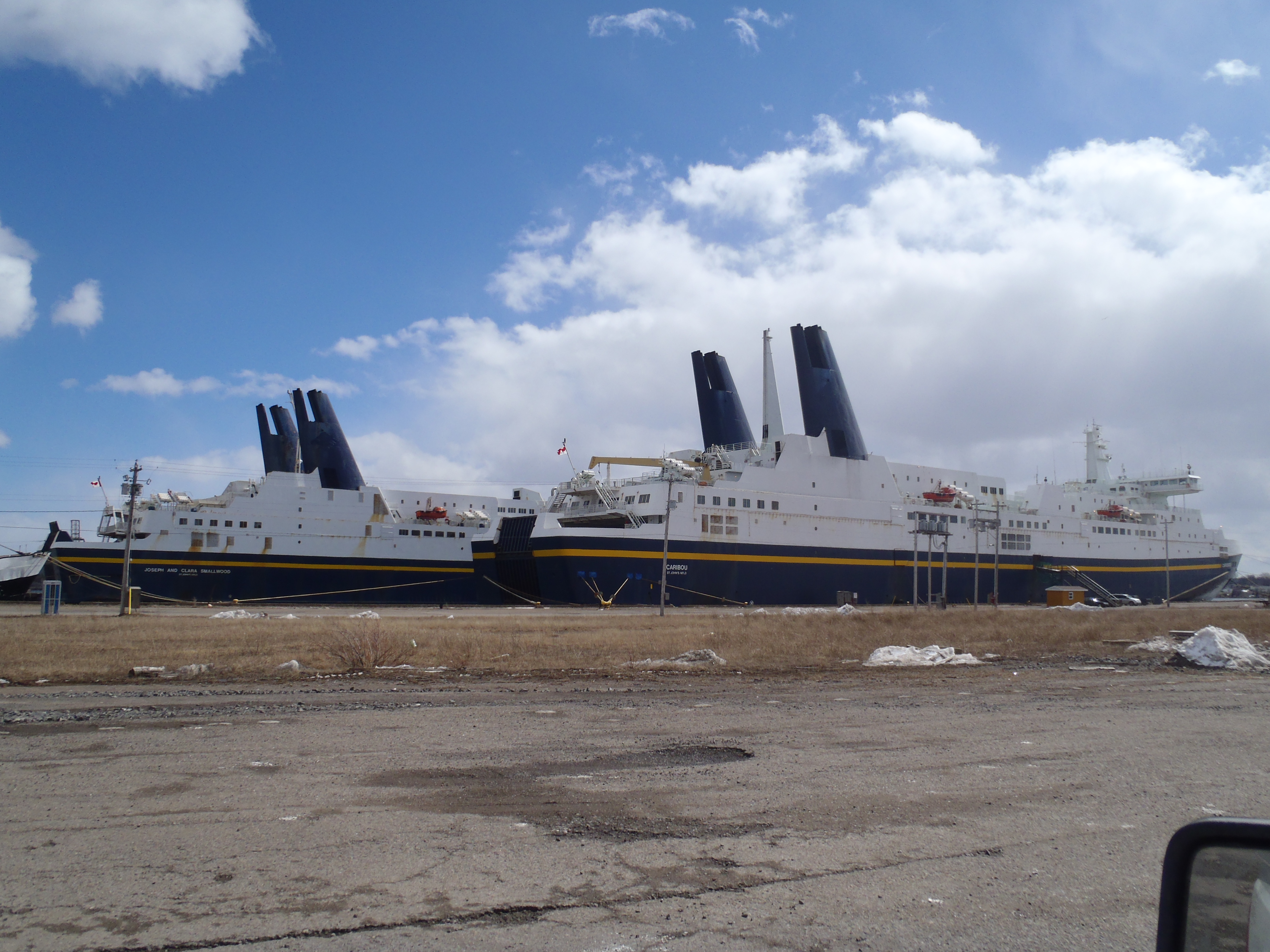
MV Caribou and MV Joseph and Clara Smallwood laid up at Sydport in Point Edward, Sydney Harbour in March 2011.

A roll-on, roll-off design with a bow visor, Caribou had 2 vehicle decks and 5 decks above, the main passenger deck being Deck 5. She measured 179 metres in overall length and 25 metres in breadth, weighing 27,212 tons. Her capacity included 1,200 passengers and 370 automobiles or 77 tractor trailers. She had up to 106 crewmembers.

Caribou's design had been commissioned by CN Marine in the early 1980s and was the culmination of years of research into effective icebreaking ship designs. The resulting hull design which Caribou and Joseph and Clara Smallwood were built to is called "Gulfspan", named in part after the Gulf of St. Lawrence. The "Gulfspan" hull is unique among Canadian icebreakers in that the ship slices through sea ice, rather than using its weight to ride up onto and crush the ice underneath. This design permits the sister ships to maintain close to regular operating speed.

At the time that Caribou entered service in 1986, CN Marine underwent a restructuring whereby the company was separated from its parent CN Rail and renamed Marine Atlantic. At the same time, CN was beginning the process of abandoning all railway service on the island of Newfoundland, which had been operating as Terra Transport. Several ferry vessels were retired and/or sold at the time that Caribou entered service and these corporate restructuring changes were taking place.

Caribou regularly made the Cabot Strait crossing from North Sydney to Channel-Port aux Basques in approximately 5 hours, 30 minutes, however she had been known to break the 5 hour mark in optimum conditions but frequently comes closer to 6 hours as dictated by established schedules.

The ship was retired by Marine Atlantic on November 26, 2010 after completing her last run from Port aux Basques to North Sydney. She was laid up in Sydney Harbour until August 31, 2011.

== Sale ==
On August 11, 2011 it was announced that Caribou had been sold to Comrie Ltd. of St. Vincent and the Grenadines. She was renamed MV Caribo by her new owners and was scrapped at Alang, India alongside her younger sister-ship Joseph and Clara Smallwood.
