= HMCS Coaticook =

River-class frigate in the Royal Canadian Navy

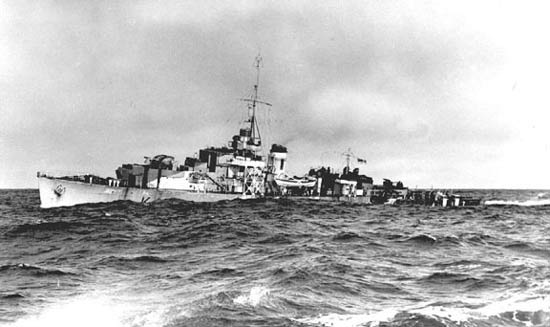
- HMCS Coaticook

History

Canada
- Name: Coaticook
- Namesake: Coaticook, Quebec
- Operator: Royal Canadian Navy
- Ordered: 1 February 1943
- Builder: Davie Shipbuilding, Lauzon
- Yard number: 553
- Laid down: 14 June 1943
- Launched: 26 November 1943
- Commissioned: 25 July 1944
- Decommissioned: 29 November 1945
- Identification: Pennant number:K 410
- Honours and awards: Atlantic 1944–1945, Gulf of St. Lawrence 1944
- Fate: Sold 1948, sank as breakwater; raised 1961 and scuttled 1962 at Race Rocks off Vancouver Island.

General characteristics
- Class & type: River-class frigate
- Displacement: 1,445 long tons (1,468 t; 1,618 short tons); 2,110 long tons (2,140 t; 2,360 short tons) (deep load)
- Length: 283 ft (86.26 m) p/p; 301.25 ft (91.82 m)o/a
- Beam: 36.5 ft (11.13 m)
- Draught: 9 ft (2.74 m); 13 ft (3.96 m) (deep load)
- Propulsion: 2 x Admiralty 3-drum boilers, 2 shafts, reciprocating vertical triple expansion, 5,500 ihp (4,100 kW)
- Speed: 20 knots (37.0 km/h); 20.5 knots (38.0 km/h) (turbine ships)
- Range: 646 long tons (656 t; 724 short tons) oil fuel; 7,500 nautical miles (13,890 km) at 15 knots (27.8 km/h)
- Complement: 157
- Armament: 2 × QF 4 in (102 mm) /45 Mk. XVI on twin mount HA/LA Mk.XIX; 1 × QF 12 pdr (3 in (76 mm)) 12 cwt /40 Mk. V on mounting HA/LA Mk.IX (not all ships); 8 × 20 mm QF Oerlikon A/A on twin mounts Mk.V; 1 × Hedgehog 24 spigot A/S projector; up to 150 depth charges

HMCS Coaticook was a River-class frigate that served with the Royal Canadian Navy during the Second World War. She fought primarily in the Battle of the Atlantic as a coastal convoy escort. She was named for Coaticook, Quebec.

Coaticook was ordered on 1 February 1943 as part of the 1943–1944 River class building programme. She was laid down on 14 June 1943 by Davie Shipbuilding & Repairing Co. Ltd. at Lauzon, Quebec and launched 26 November 1943. She was commissioned into the Royal Canadian Navy on 25 July 1944 at Quebec City.

== Background ==
The River-class frigate was designed by William Reed of Smith's Dock Company of South Bank-on-Tees. Originally called a "twin-screw corvette", its purpose was to improve on the convoy escort classes in service with the Royal Navy at the time, including the Flower-class corvette. The first orders were placed by the Royal Navy in 1940 and the vessels were named for rivers in the United Kingdom, giving name to the class. In Canada they were named for towns and cities though they kept the same designation. The name "frigate" was suggested by Vice-Admiral Percy Nelles of the Royal Canadian Navy and was adopted later that year.

Improvements over the corvette design included improved accommodation which was markedly better. The twin engines gave only three more knots of speed but extended the range of the ship to nearly double that of a corvette at 7,200 nautical miles (13,300 km) at 12 knots. Among other lessons applied to the design was an armament package better designed to combat U-boats including a twin 4-inch mount forward and 12-pounder aft. 15 Canadian frigates were initially fitted with a single 4-inch gun forward but with the exception of HMCS Valleyfield, they were all eventually upgraded to the double mount. For underwater targets, the River-class frigate was equipped with a Hedgehog anti-submarine mortar and depth charge rails aft and four side-mounted throwers.

River-class frigates were the first Royal Canadian Navy warships to carry the 147B Sword horizontal fan echo sonar transmitter in addition to the irregular ASDIC. This allowed the ship to maintain contact with targets even while firing unless a target was struck. Improved radar and direction-finding equipment improved the RCN's ability to find and track enemy submarines over the previous classes.

Canada originally ordered the construction of 33 frigates in October 1941. The design was too big for the shipyards on the Great Lakes so all the frigates built in Canada were built in dockyards along the west coast or along the St. Lawrence River. In all Canada ordered the construction of 60 frigates including ten for the Royal Navy that transferred two to the United States Navy.

== War service ==
Coaticook was sent in mid-September 1944 to Bermuda for workups after commissioning. Upon her return she was assigned to escort support group EG 27 based out of Halifax. During this period, German U-boats, the main foe of the River-class frigates, had adapted to the increased anti-submarine patrols with the introduction of the schnorkel, which allowed the U-boats to remain underwater while they recharged their batteries. This led to the German "inshore offensive" which targeted convoys along the Canadian and American coastlines that led to more forces being deployed in this area. Coaticook remained in this duty until June 1945 when she sailed for Esquimalt. She was paid off into the reserve there on 29 November 1945.

== Postwar service ==
In 1948, Coaticook was sold for stripping and in 1949, she was sunk as a breakwater at Powell River in British Columbia to replace the floating breakwater that had been installed. In 1961, the hull was refloated in an effort to tow it to Victoria, British Columbia to be broken up. However en route, a storm arose and the hull suffered damage. The damage was considered significant enough to render the hull structurally unstable. The decision was made to scuttle it instead of continuing on to Victoria. Four cases of forcite, a gelatin dynamite, were placed throughout the ship. The ship was sunk near Race Rocks, off Vancouver Island in February 1962. Photos of the resulting explosion were taken and distributed through The Canadian Press.
