= Algosteel =

Former lake freighter

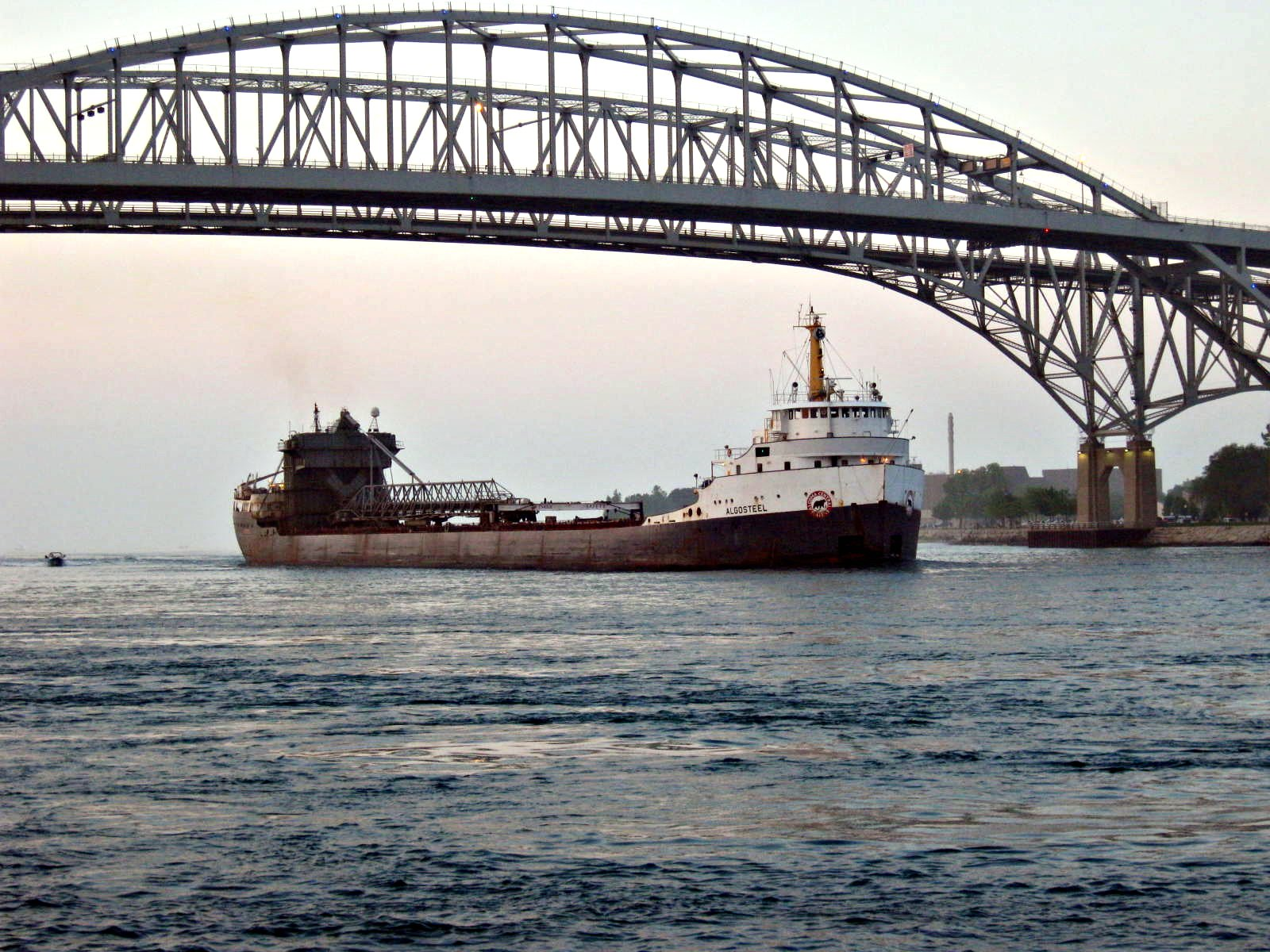
- Algosteel passes under the Blue Water Bridge

History
- Name: A.S. Glossbrenner (1966–1987); Algogulf (1987–1990); Algosteel (1990–2018); Oste (2018–2018)
- Owner: Algoma Central
- Builder: Davie Shipbuilding, Lauzon, Quebec
- Yard number: 658
- Launched: 10 May 1966
- Completed: July 1966
- Out of service: April 2018
- Identification: IMO number: 6613299
- Fate: Scrapped 2018

General characteristics
- Type: Bulk carrier
- Tonnage: 17,955 GRT; 26,690 DWT
- Length: 222.4 m (729.7 ft) oa; 216.2 m (709.3 ft) pp
- Beam: 23.0 m (75.5 ft)
- Installed power: 1 × shaft, diesel engine
- Speed: 14.5 knots (26.9 km/h; 16.7 mph)

Algosteel was a bulk carrier owned and operated by Algoma Central. The vessel was constructed in 1966 by Davie Shipbuilding at their yard in Lauzon, Quebec for Canada Steamship Lines and launched as A.S. Glossbrenner. In 1968, the vessel was acquired by the Labrador Steamship Company. In 1971, the ship was sold to Algoma Central. The vessel's name was changed to Algogulf in 1987 and to Algosteel in 1990. The bulk carrier primarily transported iron ore and grain along the Saint Lawrence Seaway and the Great Lakes. The vessel was taken out of service in April 2018 pending disposal and was scrapped in Aliağa, Turkey, in 2018 under the name Oste.

== Description ==
Algosteel is 222.4 m (729.7 ft) long overall and 216.2 m (709.3 ft) between perpendiculars with a beam of 23.0 m (75.5 ft). The ship had a gross register tonnage (GRT) of 17,955 (remeasured to 18,423 GT) and a deadweight tonnage of 26,690. The vessel is powered by a diesel engine driving one shaft giving the ship a maximum speed of 14.5 knots (26.9 km/h; 16.7 mph).

== History ==
The vessel, ordered by Canada Steamship Lines, was laid down by Davie Shipbuilding at their yard in Lauzon, Quebec with the yard number 658. The ship was launched at Lauzon on 10 May 1966 with the name A.S. Glossbrenner. The ship was built in the traditional lake freighter two superstructure design, with her bridge and officer quarters on a superstructure in her bow. As originally designed, her holds needed to be unloaded by shore facilities. The vessel was homeported in Montreal, Quebec. In 1968, the vessel was acquired by the Labrador Steamship Company. She was then mainly employed carrying iron ore from Labrador and the Gulf of St Lawrence to steel-making ports in the United States, on the Great Lakes. Her return cargoes would be grain.

In 1971 she was sold to Algoma Central. The vessel's homeport was changed to Sault Ste. Marie, Ontario. In 1987 she was renamed Algogulf. In 1990 Algoma Central renamed her Algosteel, after a refit where she was equipped with a large boom and internal conveyor belts and elevators, so she could unload her cargo without relying on shore facilities.

In February 2014, Algosteel and Algowood transported 50,000 tons of rock salt to Wisconsin from Goderich, Ontario, escorted by a United States Coast Guard icebreaker after supplies of rock salt were diminished within the American state due to significant snowfall. The ship had been stuck in ice for 18 hours before the icebreaker arrived to free the ship. In December 2014, Algosteel was one of the last ships to lay up for the winter on the Great Lakes, requiring icebreaking aid to get back to Sarnia, Ontario. The ship was taken out of service in April 2018 pending disposal. On 3 June 2018, Algosteel departed Montreal for the last time under tow by the tugboat Fairmount Alpine. Her name was changed to Oste for the tow, and she was scrapped at Aliağa, Turkey, beginning on 26 June 2018.

== See also ==
- Algogulf, the ship that was renamed Algogulf after Algosteel had been renamed
