= HMCS Jonquiere =

River-class frigate

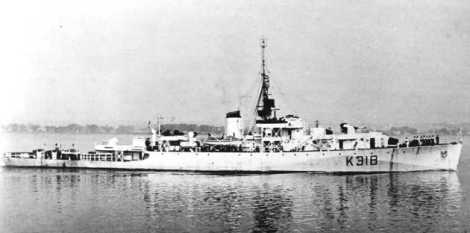
- HMCS Jonquière

History

Canada
- Name: Jonquière
- Namesake: Jonquière, Quebec
- Ordered: June 1942
- Builder: Davie Shipbuilding, Lauzon
- Laid down: 26 January 1943
- Launched: 28 October 1943
- Commissioned: 10 May 1944
- Decommissioned: 4 December 1945
- Identification: Pennant number: K 318
- Recommissioned: 20 September 1954
- Decommissioned: 23 September 1966
- Reclassified: Prestonian-class frigate
- Identification: pennant number: FFE 318
- Motto: "Au sommet par le devoir" (To the summit by duty)
- Honours and awards: Atlantic 1944
- Fate: Sold, broken up 1967 at Victoria, British Columbia
- Badge: Azure, three chevronels fesswise and interlaced, the central one higher, all proceeding from the base, and within the central one a fouled anchor and above it and touching the peak an annulet all argent within the annulet a fleur-de-lis

General characteristics
- Class & type: River-class frigate
- Displacement: 1,445 long tons (1,468 t; 1,618 short tons); 2,110 long tons (2,140 t; 2,360 short tons) (deep load)
- Length: 283 ft (86.26 m) p/p; 301.25 ft (91.82 m) o/a
- Beam: 36.5 ft (11.13 m)
- Draught: 9 ft (2.74 m); 13 ft (3.96 m) (deep load)
- Propulsion: 2 x Admiralty 3-drum boilers, 2 shafts, reciprocating vertical triple expansion, 5,500 ihp (4,100 kW)
- Speed: 20 knots (37.0 km/h); 20.5 knots (38.0 km/h) (turbine ships)
- Range: 646 long tons (656 t; 724 short tons) oil fuel; 7,500 nautical miles (13,890 km) at 15 knots (27.8 km/h)
- Complement: 157
- Armament: 2 × QF 4 in (102 mm)/45 Mk. XVI on twin mount HA/LA Mk.XIX; 1 × QF 12 pdr (3 in (76 mm)) 12 cwt /40 Mk. V on mounting HA/LA Mk.IX (not all ships); 8 × 20 mm QF Oerlikon A/A on twin mounts Mk.V; 1 × Hedgehog 24 spigot A/S projector; up to 150 depth charges

HMCS Jonquière was a River-class frigate that served with the Royal Canadian Navy during the Second World War and again from 1954–1966 as a Prestonian-class frigate. She was named for Jonquière, Quebec.

Jonquière was ordered in June 1942 as part of the 1942–1943 River-class building program. She was laid down on 26 January 1943 by G T Davie Shipbuilding Ltd. at Lauzon and launched 28 October 1943. She was commissioned into the Royal Canadian Navy on 10 May 1944 at Quebec City.

== Background ==
The River-class frigate was designed by William Reed of Smith's Dock Company of South Bank-on-Tees. Originally called a "twin-screw corvette", its purpose was to improve on the convoy escort classes in service with the Royal Navy at the time, including the Flower-class corvette. The first orders were placed by the Royal Navy in 1940 and the vessels were named for rivers in the United Kingdom, giving name to the class. In Canada they were named for towns and cities though they kept the same designation. The name "frigate" was suggested by Vice-Admiral Percy Nelles of the Royal Canadian Navy and was adopted later that year.

Improvements over the corvette design included improved accommodation which was markedly better. The twin engines gave only three more knots of speed but extended the range of the ship to nearly double that of a corvette at 7,200 nautical miles (13,300 km) at 12 knots. Among other lessons applied to the design was an armament package better designed to combat U-boats including a twin 4-inch mount forward and 12-pounder aft. 15 Canadian frigates were initially fitted with a single 4-inch gun forward but with the exception of HMCS Valleyfield, they were all eventually upgraded to the double mount. For underwater targets, the River-class frigate was equipped with a Hedgehog anti-submarine mortar and depth charge rails aft and four side-mounted throwers.

River-class frigates were the first Royal Canadian Navy warships to carry the 147B Sword horizontal fan echo sonar transmitter in addition to the irregular ASDIC. This allowed the ship to maintain contact with targets even while firing unless a target was struck. Improved radar and direction-finding equipment improved the RCN's ability to find and track enemy submarines over the previous classes.

Canada originally ordered the construction of 33 frigates in October 1941. The design was too big for the shipyards on the Great Lakes so all the frigates built in Canada were built in dockyards along the west coast or along the St. Lawrence River. In all Canada ordered the construction of 60 frigates including ten for the Royal Navy that transferred two to the United States Navy.

== Service history ==
After working up at Bermuda, Jonquière returned to Canada and was assigned to the Mid-Ocean Escort Force (MOEF) escort group C-2 as a trans-Atlantic convoy escort. She made three crossings with the group before being reassigned to escort group EG 26 based out of Derry. During her time with this unit she performed anti-submarine patrols out of derry, Plymouth and Portsmouth until May 1945. In September 1944, Jonquière collided with HMCS Assiniboine in Lough Foyle, requiring Assiniboine to return to port for repairs.

Jonquière returned to Canada with the last westbound convoy, ON 305, in June 1945. She was paid off 4 December 1945 and placed in reserve at Shelburne.

=== Postwar service ===
Jonquière remained there until she was taken to Lauzon and converted into a Prestonian-class escort. This meant a flush-decked appearance aft, with a larger bridge and taller funnel. Her hull forward was strengthened against ice and the quarterdeck was enclosed to contain two Squid anti-submarine mortars. She was recommissioned in the RCN on 20 September 1954 with the pennant FFE 318 at Lauzon. Following her recommissioning, the frigate transferred to the west coast with Digby and Brockville. On 1 January 1955, Jonquiere was assigned to the Second Canadian Escort Squadron of Pacific Command. In November 1955, the Second Canadian Escort Squadron was among the Canadian units that took part in one of the largest naval exercises since the Second World War off the coast of California.

Jonquiere was a member of the Fourth Canadian Escort Squadron based out of Esquimalt, British Columbia. In June 1960 the Fourth Canadian Escort Squadron performed a training tour of the Pacific, with stops at Yokohama, Japan, Midway Atoll and Pearl Harbor. They returned to Canada in August. She served until 23 September 1966 when she was paid off for the last time. She was purchased by Capital Iron & Metal Ltd. of Victoria, British Columbia and broken up there in 1967.
