= HMCS Huron (DDG 281) =

Destroyer of the Royal Canadian Navy

Coordinates: 48°58′.472″N 127°58′.638″W

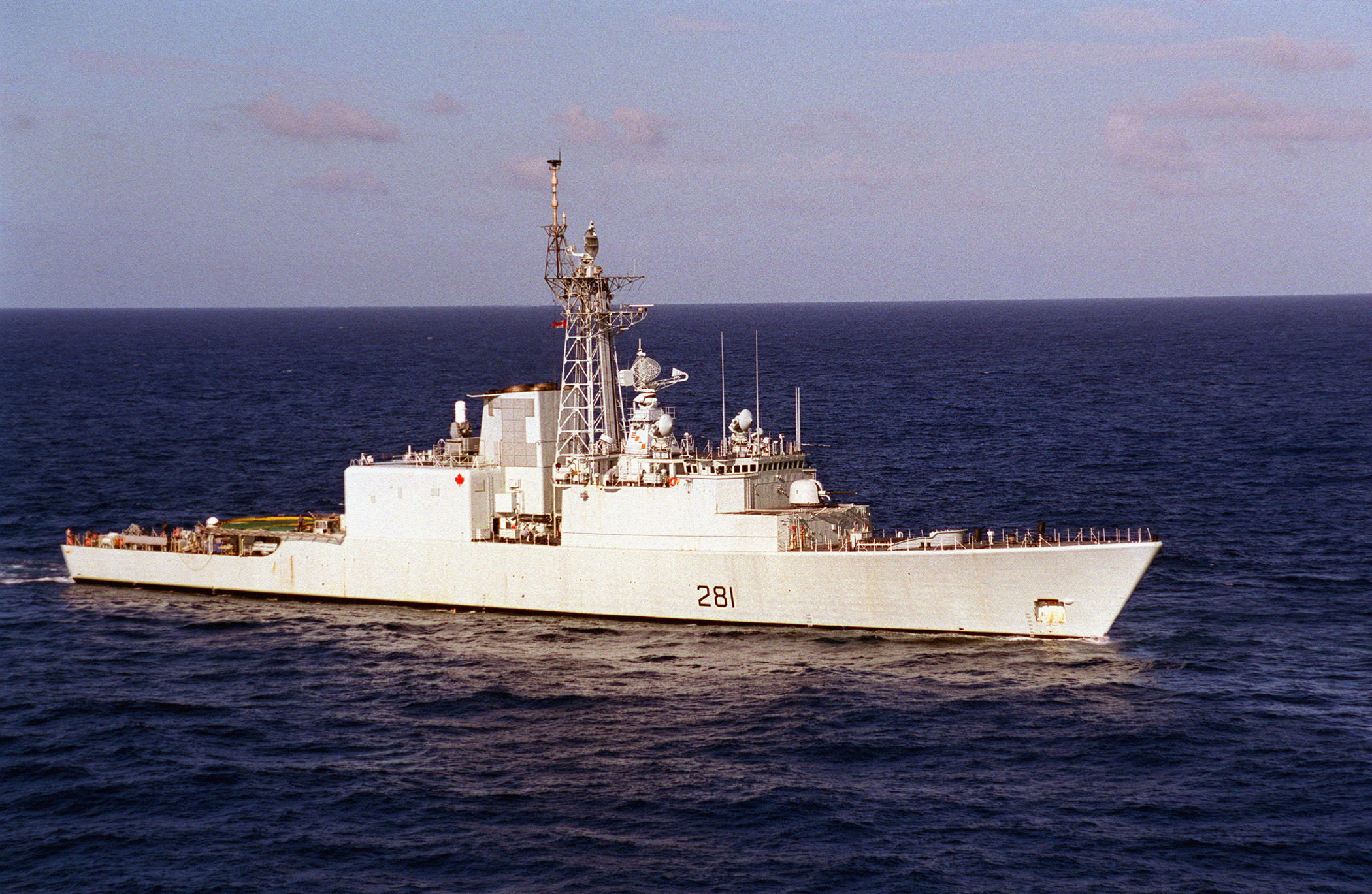
- HMCS Huron (DDG 281) in 1999

History

Canada
- Name: Huron
- Namesake: Huron
- Builder: Marine Industries, Sorel
- Laid down: 1 June 1969
- Launched: 9 April 1971
- Commissioned: 16 December 1972
- Decommissioned: 2005
- Out of service: 2000
- Refit: 25 November 1994
- Identification: Pennant number: 281
- Motto: Ready the brave
- Honours and awards: Atlantic 1943, Arctic 1943–1945, Biscay 1943–1944, Norway 1945, Korea 1952–1953
- Fate: Sunk 14 May 2007 during Operation Trident Fury, a live-fire exercise conducted by MARPAC 100 km (54.0 nmi) west of Vancouver Island.
- Notes: Colours: Gold and crimson
- Badge: Or a nicotine bloom gules, seedpod vert and stamens or.

General characteristics
- Class & type: Iroquois-class destroyer
- Displacement: 5100 t
- Length: 129.8 m (425.9 ft)
- Beam: 15.2 m (49.9 ft)
- Draught: 4.7 m (15.4 ft)
- Propulsion: COGOG – 2 shaft; 2 × Allison 570-KF cruise gas turbines (5.6 MW); 2 × Pratt & Whitney FT4A-2 boost gas turbines (37 MW)
- Speed: 29 kn (53.7 km/h)
- Range: 4,500 nmi (8,334.0 km)
- Complement: 280
- Sensors & processing systems: Signaal AN/SPQ 501 DA-08 radar; Signaal LW-08 AN/SPQ 502 radar; SQS-510 hull sonar; SQS-510 VDS sonar
- Armament: 32 × VLS, Standard SM-2MR Block IIIA SAMs; 1 × 76 mm/62 OTO Melara; 6 × 12.75 in tubes firing Mark-46 Mod 5 torpedoes; 1 × Phalanx CIWS (Block 1); 2 × M2 Browning machine guns
- Aircraft carried: 2 × CH-124 Sea King helicopters
- Aviation facilities: hangar and flight deck

HMCS Huron was an Iroquois-class destroyer that served with the Canadian Forces from 16 December 1972 to 23 October 2000. She served mainly on the western coast of Canada. After decommissioning, her hull was stripped to be used in a live-fire exercise. The ship's hulk was eventually sunk by gunfire from her sister ship, HMCS Algonquin. Huron was the second ship of her class and the second vessel to use the designation HMCS Huron.

== History ==
Huron was laid down on 1 June 1969 by the builder Marine Industries of Sorel, Quebec, and was launched on 9 April 1971. She was officially commissioned into the Canadian Forces on 16 December 1972 and carried the pennant number 281.

Huron began a refit known as the Tribal Class Update and Modernization Project (TRUMP) in July 1993, performed by MIL-Davie Shipbuilding at Lauzon, Quebec and concluded on November 25, 1994. At this time, her classification changed from Destroyer Helicopter (DDH) to Destroyer Guided Missile (DDG).

The ship was assigned to Maritime Forces Pacific (MARPAC) and was homeported at Canadian Forces Base Esquimalt.

== Service ==
Huron served on MARPAC missions protecting Canada's sovereignty in the Pacific Ocean and enforced Canadian laws in its territorial sea and Exclusive Economic Zone. Huron was also deployed on missions throughout the Pacific and to the Indian Ocean; specifically the Persian Gulf and Arabian Sea on anti-terrorism operations.

As part of Silver Jubilee of Elizabeth II, Huron represented Canada in the naval review at Spithead on 28 June 1977. On 12 March 1980, it assisted the crew of the damaged freighter Maurice Desgagnes eventually taking them off when the ship sank.

From 19 February to 24 February 1981, Huron was used to carry out trials of the Sea Sparrow system to be added in the TRUMP refit. Later that year she carried the Governor-General Edward Schreyer on a tour of Scandinavian ports. In the summer of 1990 Huron, accompanied by HMCS Kootenay and HMCS Annapolis, visited Vladivostok, the first visit by Canadian warships to Russia since the Second World War.

Huron was sent to the Persian Gulf in the winter of 1991 as part of Operation Friction, the Canadian Forces' contribution to Operation Desert Storm (the Gulf War), to replace her sister ship HMCS Athabaskan as flagship of the Canadian Naval Task Group. Huron arrived after hostilities had ceased and patrolled for several months before returning to Esquimalt.

In 1993 Huron was deployed to the Adriatic Sea as part of Operation Sharp Guard in support of the United Nations naval embargo of the former Yugoslavia. She then departed for the refit that began in July of that year. After completing her TRUMP refit, Huron returned to the west coast in 1995, taking part in most of the major naval exercises in the Pacific Ocean. On 7 September 1999, with Royal Canadian Mounted Police and personnel from Immigration Canada aboard, the warship intercepted a vessel carrying 146 Chinese migrants. The migrant ship was found to be unfit and Huron transported the passengers to Esquimalt.

Huron appeared in the episode "The Devil and the Deep Blue Sea" of the television series Seven Days, representing a new type of US warship under the command of a female captain.

== Paying off and sinking ==
Despite Huron being the most recently refitted Iroquois-class destroyer, she was placed in mothballed status in 2000, due to a personnel shortage following defence cutbacks during the late 1990s. In 2005 she was paid off from the Canadian Forces and awaited disposal at Esquimalt.

In 2006 MARPAC decided to use ex-Huron in what would become the first sink-exercise that Maritime Command (MARCOM) conducted. The exercise was named Operation Trident Fury and was planned to use a variety of MARPAC ships, and US Navy and AIRCOM aircraft, to bombard ex-Huron with artillery, missiles and strafing fire, and finally to sink the ship with a torpedo launched from a submarine.

ex-Huron was stripped of armaments and all environmentally harmful contaminant equipment and fuel in the winter of 2006–2007. On 14 May 2007 she was towed to the MARPAC offshore weapons range west of Vancouver Island. Despite being damaged by HMCS Regina with a Sea Sparrow surface-to-air missile, 57 mm gunfire and CIWS rounds, it was 76 mm naval gunfire from Algonquin that was responsible for sinking the hulk of ex-Huron. The main gun used by Algonquin had originally been installed on Huron, meaning that ex-Huron was eventually sunk by one of her own weapons. This was the first operational sinking of a Canadian warship in home waters.

The sinking was the subject of a 2007 History Television documentary, "Sinking a Destroyer".

== Ship's bell ==
The Christening Bells Project at CFB Esquimalt's Naval and Military Museum includes information from the ship's bell of HMCS Huron, which was used for baptism of babies on board ship from 1973 to 1997. The bell is currently held by the museum in Esquimalt.
