= MIL-Davie Shipbuilding =

Former ship building company

MIL-Davie Shipbuilding was a historic Canadian shipbuilding company that was located in both Sorel, Quebec (MIL) and Lauzon, Quebec (Davie).

In 1986, Marine Industries Limited merged with Davie Shipbuilding to become MIL-Davie Shipbuilding.

The company declared insolvency and filed for bankruptcy in the early 2000s due to a lack of contracts and was sold to Norwegian interests TECO Maritime.

The Quebec facility, located on the St. Lawrence River across from Quebec City, was closed in 1997 and was re-activated for a contract, delivered in 2009, and renamed Davie Yards Incorporated.

== Ships built ==
Ferries

- MV Joseph and Clara Smallwood (1986)
- MV Caribou (1984)

Warships

- Halifax-class frigate
  - HMCS Ville de Québec (FFH 332)
  - HMCS Regina (FFH 334)
  - HMCS Calgary (FFH 335)

== See also ==
- Marine Industries Limited
- Davie Shipbuilding
