= HMCS Huron =

Two Canadian naval ships have been named HMCS Huron:

- HMCS Huron (G24) was a Second World War Tribal-class destroyer. She was in commission between 1943–1946 and 1950–1963. She was broken up for scrap in 1965.
- HMCS Huron (DDG 281) was an Iroquois-class destroyer active from 1972 to 2005. She was sunk as target in 2007.

== Battle honours ==
Ships named Huron have earned the following battle honours;

- Atlantic, 1943
- Arctic, 1943–1945
- Biscay, 1943–1944
- Norway, 1945
- Korea, 1952–1953
