= HMCS Stratford =

History

Canada
- Name: Stratford
- Namesake: City of Stratford
- Builder: Davie Shipbuilding, Lauzon (Note: Colledge and shipbuildinghistory.com both have Stratford being built by Dufferin Shipbuilding Co., Toronto)
- Laid down: 29 October 1941
- Launched: 4 February 1942
- Commissioned: 29 August 1942
- Decommissioned: 1 April 1946
- Identification: Pennant number: J310
- Honours and awards: Atlantic 1942–44, Gulf of St. Lawrence 1942, 1944
- Fate: Sold for scrap 1946

General characteristics
- Class & type: Bangor-class minesweeper
- Displacement: 672 long tons (683 t)
- Length: 180 ft (54.9 m) oa
- Beam: 28 ft 6 in (8.7 m)
- Draught: 9 ft 9 in (3.0 m)
- Propulsion: 2 Admiralty 3-drum water tube boilers, 2 shafts, vertical triple-expansion reciprocating engines, 2,400 ihp (1,790 kW)
- Speed: 16.5 knots (31 km/h)
- Complement: 83
- Armament: 1 × 12-pounder (3 in (76 mm)) 12 cwt HA gun; 1 x QF 2 pdr Mark VIII; 2 × QF 20 mm Oerlikon guns; 40 depth charges as escort

HMCS Stratford was a Bangor-class minesweeper that served in the Royal Canadian Navy during the Second World War. The minesweeper saw action in the Battle of the Atlantic and the Battle of the St. Lawrence. In March 1945 Stratford collided with another ship and was rendered unusable. The minesweeper was broken up in 1946. She was named after the city of Stratford, Ontario.

== Design and description ==
A British design, the Bangor-class minesweepers were smaller than the preceding Halcyon-class minesweepers in British service, but larger than the Fundy class in Canadian service. They came in two versions powered by different engines; those with a diesel engines and those with vertical triple-expansion steam engines. Stratford was of the latter design and was larger than her diesel-engined cousins. Stratford was 180 feet (54.9 m) long overall, had a beam of 28 feet 6 inches (8.7 m) and a draught of 9 feet 9 inches (3.0 m). The minesweeper had a displacement of 672 long tons (683 t). She had a complement of 6 officers and 77 enlisted.

Stratford had two vertical triple-expansion steam engines, each driving one shaft, using steam provided by two Admiralty three-drum boilers. The engines produced a total of 2,400 indicated horsepower (1,800 kW) and gave a maximum speed of 16.5 knots (30.6 km/h; 19.0 mph). The minesweeper could carry a maximum of 150 long tons (152 t) of fuel oil.

Stratford was armed with a single quick-firing (QF) 12-pounder (3 in (76 mm)) 12 cwt HA gun mounted forward. (Note: "Cwt" is the abbreviation for hundredweight, 20 cwt referring to the weight of the gun.) The ship was also fitted with a QF 2-pounder Mark VIII aft and were eventually fitted with single-mounted QF 20 mm Oerlikon guns on the bridge wings. Those ships assigned to convoy duty had two depth charge launchers and four chutes to deploy the 40 depth charges they carried.

== Service history ==
Stratford was ordered to be built as part of the Royal Canadian Navy's 1941–42 shipbuilding programme. The minesweeper's keel was laid down on 29 October 1941 by Davie Shipbuilding and Repairing Co. Ltd. at Lauzon, Quebec. The ship was launched on 14 February 1942 and commissioned into the Royal Canadian Navy on 29 August at Toronto.

After arriving at Halifax, Nova Scotia, Stratford was assigned to Newfoundland Force. With that unit, the ship was used as convoy escort throughout the war. In December 1944, she underwent a refit at Dartmouth. After its completion she traveled to Bermuda to work up from 15 February to 18 March 1945. During her return from Bermuda, Stratford collided with the destroyer HMCS Ottawa in the approaches to Halifax on 11 March 1945. Her forecastle was damaged significantly and as a result of this, she remained inactive until being paid off on 4 January 1946. She was placed on the disposal list in 1946 and sold for scrap. The ship was broken up in 1946.

== See also ==
- List of ships of the Canadian Navy
