= HMCS Digby =

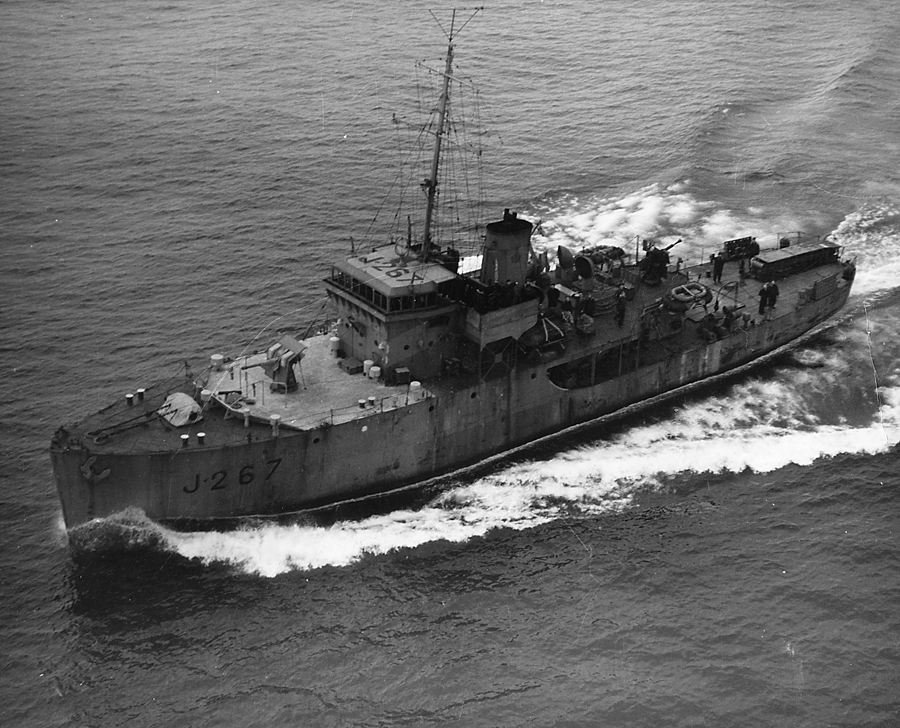
- HMCS Digby

History

Canada
- Name: Digby
- Namesake: Digby, Nova Scotia
- Builder: Davie Shipbuilding, Lauzon
- Laid down: 20 March 1941
- Launched: 5 June 1942
- Commissioned: 26 July 1942
- Decommissioned: 31 July 1945
- Identification: Pennant number:J267
- Recommissioned: 29 April 1953
- Decommissioned: 14 November 1956
- Identification: Pennant number:179
- Honours and awards: Atlantic 1942–44, Gulf of St. Lawrence 1942, 1944.
- Fate: Broken up 1956
- Badge: Azure, an ostrich argent, holding in its beak a horseshoe or, and supporting with its dexter foot a bezant.

General characteristics
- Class & type: Bangor-class minesweeper
- Displacement: 592 long tons (601 t)
- Length: 162 ft (49.4 m)
- Beam: 28 ft (8.5 m)
- Draught: 8.25 ft (2.51 m)
- Propulsion: 2 shafts, 9-cylinder diesel, 2,000 bhp (1,500 kW)
- Speed: 16 knots (30 km/h)
- Complement: 83
- Armament: 1 × QF 12-pounder 12 cwt naval gun; 1 × QF 2-pounder Mark VIII; 2 × QF 20 mm Oerlikon guns; 40 depth charges as escort

HMCS Digby was a Bangor-class minesweeper that served in the Royal Canadian Navy during the Second World War. She saw action in the Battle of the Atlantic and the Battle of the St. Lawrence. After the war she was supposed to be transferred to the Royal Canadian Mounted Police but that was cancelled and instead was recommissioned into the Royal Canadian Navy, serving until 1956.

== Design and description ==
The Bangor class was initially to be a scaled down minesweeper design of the Halcyon class in Royal Navy service. However, due to the difficulty procuring diesel engines led to the small number of the diesel version being completed. The ships displaced 592 long tons (601 t) standard and 690 long tons (700 t) fully loaded. They were 162 feet (49.4 m) long with a beam of 28 feet (8.5 m) and a draught of 8 feet 3 inches (2.51 m). However, the size of the ship led to criticisms of their being too cramped for magnetic or acoustic minesweeping gear. This may have been due to all the additions made during the war with the installation of ASDIC, radar and depth charges.

The Bangor class came in two versions. Digby was of the diesel-powered version, being equipped with a 9-cylinder diesel engine driving two shafts that produced 2,000 brake horsepower (1,500 kW). This gave the ship a maximum speed of 16.5 knots (30.6 km/h). The vessels carried 65 long tons (66 t) of oil. The vessels had a complement of 6 officers and 77 ratings.

The Canadian diesel-powered Bangors were armed with a single quick-firing (QF) 12-pounder 12 cwt gun mounted forward. (Note: "Cwt" is the abbreviation for hundredweight, 20 cwt referring to the weight of the gun.) Initially the design called for a 4-inch (102 mm) gun, however these were replaced with 12-pounder guns. The ships were also fitted with a QF 2-pounder Mark VIII gun aft and were eventually fitted with single-mounted QF 20 mm Oerlikon guns on the bridge wings. For those ships assigned to convoy duty, they were armed with two depth charge launchers and two chutes to deploy the 40 depth charges they carried.

== Service history ==
Digby was ordered as part of the 1940–41 building programme. The minesweeper's keel was laid down on 20 March 1941 by Davie Shipbuilding and Repairing Co. Ltd. at Lauzon, Quebec and the ship was launched on 5 June 1942. She was commissioned into the Royal Canadian Navy on 26 July 1942 at Quebec City.

After working up at Pictou, Digby joined the Western Local Escort Force (WLEF). In January 1943 WLEF organized escort groups. Digby was assigned to 24.18.1 alongside the corvettes Arrowhead and Chicoutimi. In June 1943, when WLEF reorganized their escort groups, she was assigned to escort group W-5. She remained with the group until April 1944 when a refit was required, to be performed at Lunenburg. The refit was completed at Halifax and upon returning from workups in Bermuda, she was assigned to Sydney Force.

In February 1945, Digby was assigned to Newfoundland Force until returning to Canada and being paid off on 31 July 1945. She was placed in reserve at Shelburne, Nova Scotia. After the war Digby was offered for transfer to the Royal Canadian Mounted Police Marine Section, to be renamed Perry. However, the takeover did not take place. The vessel was taken to Sorel to lay in strategic reserve until 1951, when she was reacquired by the Royal Canadian Navy. She was refitted for training duties.

=== Postwar service ===
Digby was recommissioned on 29 April 1953 with the new pennant number 179. The ship was refit before reentering service, receiving a Hedgehog anti-submarine mortar and the 12-pounder gun was removed and replaced with a 40 mm Bofors gun. She was used, along with HMCS Granby, in 1953 on Lake Ontario to test the Royal Canadian Navy's DATAR system. In October 1954 Digby transferred to the west coast with Brockville and Jonquiere. On 4 December 1955, Brockville, Digby and Cordova formed the Second Canadian Reserve Squadron for training purposes at Esquimalt.

She was paid off on 14 November 1956 and sold for scrap. Digby was broken up in 1956–57.

== See also ==
- List of ships of the Canadian Navy
