= Davie Yards Incorporated =

- Type: Subsidiary
- Industry: Ship building
- Predecessors: Davie Shipbuilding; MIL-Davie Shipbuilding
- Founded: 2006; 20 years ago
- Defunct: 2011
- Successor: Chantier Davie Canada Inc.
- Headquarters: Lauzon, Quebec, Canada
- Parent: TECO Group

Davie Yards Incorporated was a ship building unit of TECO Group of Norway and is the successor to Davie Shipbuilding and MIL-Davie Shipbuilding from 2006 to 2011.

Created in 2006 when TECO purchase the assets for the bankrupt MIL-Davie, the new Canadian unit was based in Lauzon, Quebec.

== Fincantieri bid ==
In early 2011, Davie announced a bid by Fincantieri – Cantieri Navali Italiani of Italy and Fincantieri subsidiary DRS Technologies Canada to purchase the shipyard from TECO. This deal fell through in July 2011.

== Seaway bid ==
After the Fincantieri deal fell through, the yard underwent financial restructuring in July 2011 in order to qualify to bid for a portion of the $40 billion contract known as the National Shipbuilding Procurement Strategy which will see ships built for the Canadian Coast Guard, Canadian Forces and Department of Fisheries and Oceans. This procurement strategy had its bidding deadline extended by three weeks specifically to accommodate the Davie restructuring.

As part of the restructuring, Upper Lakes Groups Incorporated (owner of Seaway Marine & Industrial Inc.) bought the assets of the bankrupt of Davie Yards Incorporated. The Canadian engineering conglomerate SNC-Lavalin, Upper Lakes Groups Inc. and South Korean shipbuilder Daewoo Shipbuilding & Marine Engineering (DSME) were partnered in this joint venture. The new company was born as Chantier Davie Canada Inc.

Davie was not selected for NSPS. With this failure, DSME declined to join the joint venture and SNC-Lavalin withdrew from the joint venture in May 2012. Upper Lakes, which was the only owner of the yard, was sold to British owned and Monaco based Zafiro Marine Industries (now as Inocea) in November 2012. The company has kept the same name under the ownership by Upper Great Lakes.

== Ships ==
A list of ships built at the yard while under TECO ownership (2006–2011):

- MV Cecon Pride (offshore construction vessel) – completed 2013 by Inocea-owned Chantier Davie Canada
