= MV Algocape =

Canadian lake freighter

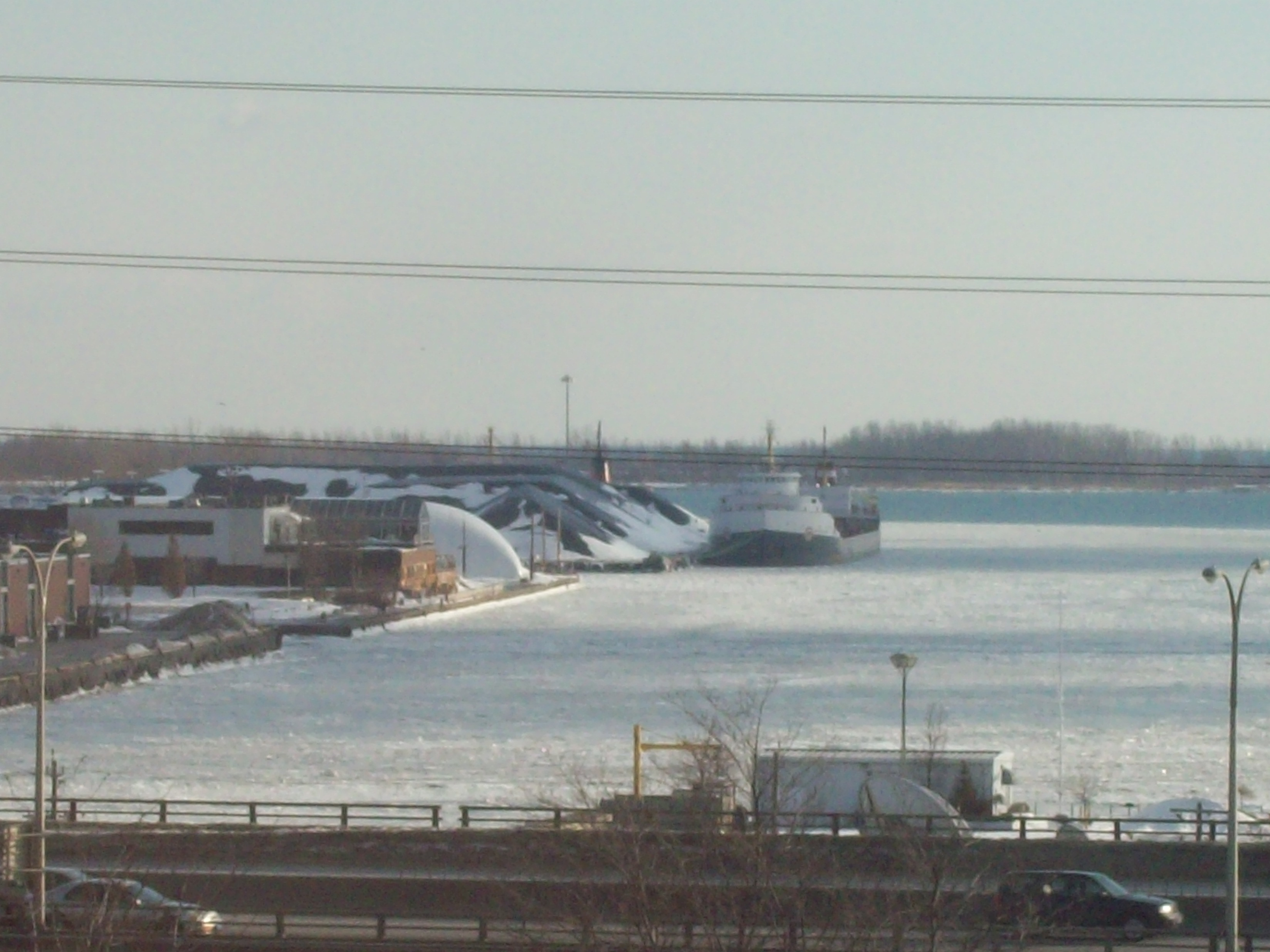
- Algocape moored in Toronto in 2008.

History
- Name: Richelieu (1967–1994); Algocape (1994–2012); Goc (2012)
- Owner: Canada Steamship Lines (1967–1971); Pipe Line Tankers (1971-1984); Canada Steamship Lines (1984-1994); Algoma Central (1994–2012); Dido Steel Corporation (2012)
- Port of registry: Montreal (1967–1984); Toronto (1984–2012)
- Builder: Davie Shipbuilding, Lauzon
- Launched: November 25, 1966
- Completed: April 1967
- Out of service: June 12, 2012
- Identification: IMO number: 6703214; Call sign: VGJC
- Fate: Scrapped 2012

General characteristics
- Type: Lake freighter
- Tonnage: 17,822 GT; 29,709 DWT
- Length: 729 ft 9 in (222.43 m)
- Beam: 75 ft 4 in (22.96 m)
- Depth: 39 ft 8 in (12.09 m)
- Propulsion: 1 × 9,470 hp (7,062 kW) Sulzer 6RD76 6-cylinder marine diesel engine; Bow thruster
- Speed: 15 knots (28 km/h; 17 mph)
- Capacity: 29,950 long tons (30,430 t)

Algocape was a Canadian lake freighter operated by Algoma Central Initially constructed for Canada Steamship Lines as Richelieu, the ship was sold to Algoma Central Corp in 1994 and renamed Algocape. In 2012, the ship was sold again to Dido Steel Corporation and renamed Goc and broken up for scrap.

== Design and description ==
Algocape had a gross tonnage of 17,822 and a deadweight tonnage of 29,709 tons. The ship was 729 feet 9 inches (222.43 m) long with a beam of 75 feet 4 inches (22.96 m). The ship had a depth of 39 ft 8 in (12.09 m). The lake freighter was powered by one 9,470 horsepower (7,062 kW) Sulzer 6RD76 6-cylinder marine diesel engine and had a bow thruster. Algocape had a maximum speed of 15 knots (28 km/h; 17 mph). The ship had a capacity of 29,950 long tons (30,430 t).

== Service history ==
Built by Davie Shipbuilding at Lauzon, Quebec, she was launched on November 25, 1966, as Richelieu, for Canada Steamship Lines. The ship was completed in April 1967 and her port of registry was Montreal, Quebec. In 1971 the registered ownership of the ship passed to Pipe Line Tankers Ltd, however the ship remained registered in Montreal. Her ownership returned to the Canada Steamship Lines in 1984, however, her port of registry was switched to Toronto, Ontario.

The freighter was renamed Algocape in 1994, when she was acquired by Algoma Central Corp., taking the name of an earlier vessel which was sold that year to P & H Shipping. Duluth, Minnesota, Thunder Bay and Hamilton, Ontario, Sept-Îles and Baie-Comeau, Quebec, were among her regular ports of call. In 1995 one of Algocape's lookouts spotted a large package of illicit drugs bobbing in the water near Thorold, Ontario.

In February 2002 Algocape's engines failed, while she was unloading raw sugar at the Redpath Sugar Refinery at the foot of Jarvis Street in Toronto.

In 2012, the ship was sold to Dido Steel Corporation of Freetown, Sierra Leone, and renamed Goc. In August 2012 the ship was towed from Montreal to Aliağa, Turkey, and subsequently broken up.
