= HMCS Lasalle =

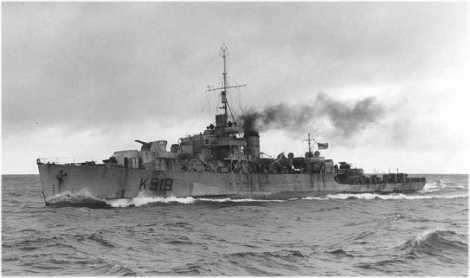
- HMCS LaSalle

History

Canada
- Name: HMCS LaSalle
- Namesake: LaSalle, Quebec
- Ordered: 1 February 1943
- Builder: Davie Shipbuilding, Lauzon
- Laid down: 4 June 1943
- Launched: 11 December 1943
- Commissioned: 29 June 1944
- Decommissioned: 17 December 1945
- Identification: Pennant number:K 519
- Honours and awards: Gulf of St. Lawrence 1944, Atlantic 1945
- Fate: Sold 1947, hull stripped and sunk as breakwater in 1948.

General characteristics
- Class & type: River-class frigate
- Displacement: 1,445 long tons (1,468 t; 1,618 short tons); 2,110 long tons (2,140 t; 2,360 short tons) (deep load)
- Length: 283 ft (86.26 m) p/p; 301.25 ft (91.82 m)o/a
- Beam: 36.5 ft (11.13 m)
- Draught: 9 ft (2.74 m); 13 ft (3.96 m) (deep load)
- Propulsion: 2 x Admiralty 3-drum boilers, 2 shafts, reciprocating vertical triple expansion, 5,500 ihp (4,100 kW)
- Speed: 20 knots (37.0 km/h); 20.5 knots (38.0 km/h) (turbine ships)
- Range: 646 long tons (656 t; 724 short tons) oil fuel; 7,500 nautical miles (13,890 km) at 15 knots (27.8 km/h)
- Complement: 157
- Armament: 2 × QF 4 in (102 mm)/45 Mk. XVI on twin mount HA/LA Mk.XIX; 1 × QF 12 pdr (3 in (76 mm)) 12 cwt /40 Mk. V on mounting HA/LA Mk.IX (not all ships); 8 × 20 mm QF Oerlikon A/A on twin mounts Mk.V; 1 × Hedgehog 24 spigot A/S projector; up to 150 depth charges

HMCS LaSalle was a River-class frigate that served with the Royal Canadian Navy during the Second World War. She served primarily as a convoy escort in the Battle of the Atlantic and in the Battle of the St. Lawrence. She was named for LaSalle, Quebec.

LaSalle was ordered on 1 February 1943 as part of the 1943–1944 River-class building program. She was laid down on 4 June 1943 by Davie Shipbuilding & Repairing Co. Ltd. at Lauzon and launched 11 December 1943. She was commissioned into the RCN on 29 June 1944 at Quebec City.

== Background ==
The River-class frigate was designed by William Reed of Smith's Dock Company of South Bank-on-Tees. Originally called a "twin-screw corvette", its purpose was to improve on the convoy escort classes in service with the Royal Navy at the time, including the Flower-class corvette. The first orders were placed by the Royal Navy in 1940 and the vessels were named for rivers in the United Kingdom, giving name to the class. In Canada they were named for towns and cities though they kept the same designation. The name "frigate" was suggested by Vice-Admiral Percy Nelles of the Royal Canadian Navy and was adopted later that year.

Improvements over the corvette design included improved accommodation which was markedly better. The twin engines gave only three more knots of speed but extended the range of the ship to nearly double that of a corvette at 7,200 nautical miles (13,300 km) at 12 knots. Among other lessons applied to the design was an armament package better designed to combat U-boats including a twin 4-inch mount forward and 12-pounder aft. 15 Canadian frigates were initially fitted with a single 4-inch gun forward but with the exception of HMCS Valleyfield, they were all eventually upgraded to the double mount. For underwater targets, the River-class frigate was equipped with a Hedgehog anti-submarine mortar and depth charge rails aft and four side-mounted throwers.

River-class frigates were the first Royal Canadian Navy warships to carry the 147B Sword horizontal fan echo sonar transmitter in addition to the irregular ASDIC. This allowed the ship to maintain contact with targets even while firing unless a target was struck. Improved radar and direction-finding equipment improved the RCN's ability to find and track enemy submarines over the previous classes.

Canada originally ordered the construction of 33 frigates in October 1941. The design was too big for the shipyards on the Great Lakes so all the frigates built in Canada were built in dockyards along the west coast or along the St. Lawrence River. In all Canada ordered the construction of 60 frigates including ten for the Royal Navy that transferred two to the United States Navy.

== Service history ==
After working up in Bermuda, LaSalle she returned to Canada in October 1944 and joined escort group EG 27 for local convoy escort. During her time with EG 27, she fought in the Battle of the St. Lawrence. She remained with the group performing anti-submarine patrols and support duty until June 1945. In June she sailed to the west coast where she was paid off at Esquimalt, British Columbia on 17 December 1945.

She was sold to Capital Iron & Metals Ltd. of Victoria, British Columbia in 1947 and stripped and sunk as a breakwater in Kelsey Bay, British Columbia in 1948.
