= Davie Shipbuilding =

Canadian shipbuilding company

Coordinates: 46.83015°N 71.1594°W

- Industry: Shipbuilding
- Predecessor: MIL-Davie Shipbuilding
- Founded: 1825; 201 years ago – as Davie shipyard 1850; 176 years ago – George T. Davie & Sons; 1914; 112 years ago – Davie Shipbuilding & Repairing; 1985; 41 years ago – Versatile Davie Incorporated; 1986; 40 years ago – MIL Davie Shipbuilding; 2000; 26 years ago – Industries Davie, Limited; 2006; 20 years ago – Davie Yards Incorporated; 2011; 15 years ago – Chantier Davie Canada Inc.
- Headquarters: Lauzon, Quebec, Canada
- Products: Ferries, naval vessels, icebreakers, offshore
- Owner: Chantier Davie Canada Incorporated
- Parent: Inocea Group – former Zafiro Marine Industries Incorporated
- Website: davie.ca

Davie Shipbuilding is a shipbuilding company located in Lauzon, Quebec, Canada. The facility is now operating as Chantier Davie Canada Inc. and is the oldest shipbuilder in North America that retains the name of its founders (under its parent group Inocea), and Canada's last remaining big-ship shipbuilder.

== History ==
The Davie shipyard in Lauzon, Quebec has a complex ownership history.

=== 19th century ===
The Davie firm was founded in 1825 by English-born ship captain Allison Davie (May 4, 1796 – June 1836) and English-born shipbuilder George Taylor (1782-1861); the Davie construction record, however, only dates to 1897. The Davie company was established in the 1830s on the south shore of the St. Lawrence River across from Quebec City in the community of Lauzon, Quebec (now part of the city of Levis, Quebec). Davie's father-in-law, George Taylor, had begun a shipbuilding business in 1811 after his arrival from England on the southwest shores of Île d’Orléans at Trou St. Patrice (closed briefly 1812 due to the War of 1812 to build ships in Upper Canada and permanently after 1827), became partners in 1825 and built their shipyard at rue de Saint Thomas and Cote de la Canotiere around 1827 and moved to north side of St Lawrence in 1832) and Davie apparently purchased those assets as well. Following Allison Davie's death, the company was headed by his wife Elizabeth Davie until 1850, when it became George T. Davie & Sons under Davie's son George Taylor Davie (1828–1907).

It changed its name in 1914 to Davie Shipbuilding & Repairing. The Davie family sold the shipyard to Canada Steamship Lines (CSL) in 1929 but started the George T. Davie shipyard immediately next door to the larger Lauzon facility. The second shipyard was managed by sons Allison Cufaude Davie and George Duncan Davie, with the former taking full control following the death of the latter in 1937.

Davie's Brothers Limited remained in family ownership until 1951 and was owned by Logistec Corporation (1971) and finally, Équimer (1987) before the yard closed for good in 1989.

=== 20th century ===
The company built a wide range of vessels in the 1800s and the first half of the 20th century, ranging from wooden sailing vessels and steamers to modern steel ships, both cargo and passenger carriers. During World War II, Davie built 35 warships (minesweepers, corvettes and destroyers).

On October 27, 1955, the Davie yard was almost destroyed by a massive fire which started in the foundry. It lasted eight hours, and although no one was injured many employees were left unemployed for several months.

By the 1970s, Canada Steamship Lines was owned by Power Corporation and in a 1976 restructuring, it sold the Davie yard to Societé de Construction Navale (Soconav) which was established by former employees of Marine Industries Ltd with the financial backing of the Quebec provincial government's Societé Générale de Financement. In 1981 the Davie shipyard was sold to Dome Petroleum and in 1985 it was sold to Versatile Corporation which changed the name of the shipyard to "Versatile Davie Incorporated".

In the 1970s to 1980s the Davie yard built oil rigs and some warships. However, after CSL ended its ownership the company began to fail. By the 1980s, the company was in financial trouble and was bailed out by both the provincial and federal governments. In 1986 the federal government asked Quebec to rationalize its shipyards. Marine Industries Ltd (MIL) merged with Versatile Davie Inc to become MIL-Davie Shipbuilding. Under this new arrangement, MIL's shipyard in Sorel, Quebec was called "M.I.L. Tracy" (for Tracy, Quebec, a neighborhood of Sorel) and the former Davie yard in Lauzon was called "M.I.L. Lauzon." Shortly after the merger, the new company, MIL-Davie Shipbuilding closed the Sorel shipyard along with the Versatile Vickers shipyard in Montreal, resulting in a total loss of 1,700 jobs but kept the Lauzon yard open as it was working on building two large vessels for Marine Atlantic and three warships for the Royal Canadian Navy's Canadian Patrol Frigate Project.

After the warship project was finished in the early 1990s, MIL-Davie Shipbuilding, along with the Davie yard in Lauzon went into receivership. After being bought by the Quebec government, Davie was sold to Dominion Bridge Company for $1. In 1998, the parent Dominion Bridge Company went into bankruptcy and the Davie shipyard went into trusteeship in 1998. It was sold again in 2000 and became "Industries Davie, Ltd". During this period, the company undertook a number of projects involving vessels and rigs which serve the offshore oil and gas market. These included the upgrade of a semi-submersible platform for Petrobras and the conversion of a vessel for pipe laying.

=== 21st century ===
In 2006, the shipyard was almost auctioned in June, before it was sold to TECO Maritime ASA of Norway and was restructured into a new company called Davie Yards Incorporated. In February 2010 TECO received protection from its creditors. It employed at the time, 1,000 people. Investissement Québec held CAD$28 million in share capital, so Davie can be considered partly an SOE.

In early 2011, TECO announced that Davie Yards Inc announced a bid by Fincantieri – Cantieri Navali Italiani of Italy and Fincantieri subsidiary DRS Technologies Canada to purchase the shipyard from TECO. This deal fell through in July 2011. After the Fincantieri deal fell through, the yard underwent financial restructuring in July 2011 in order to qualify to bid for a portion of the first stages of the National Shipbuilding Procurement Strategy (NSPS) which will see ships built for the Canadian Coast Guard, Royal Canadian Navy and Department of Fisheries and Oceans, for a total value of CAD$33 billion or $35 billion. The NSPS had its bidding deadline extended by three weeks specifically to accommodate the Davie restructuring.

As part of the restructuring, on 21 July 2011 Upper Lakes Groups Inc. (owner of Seaway Marine & Industrial Inc. in St. Catharines) bought the assets of the bankrupt Davie Yards Inc. The Canadian engineering conglomerate SNC-Lavalin, Upper Lakes Groups Inc. and South Korean shipbuilder Daewoo Shipbuilding & Marine Engineering (DSME) had formalized the week before a joint venture to bid for the contract. The new company bore the name Chantier Davie Canada Inc.

Davie was not selected for the first contracts in the NSPS program, which went instead to Vancouver Shipyards, a subsidiary of Seaspan, and Halifax Shipyards, a unit of the Irving Group of Companies. Vancouver Shipyards obtained an $8 billion contract to supply the Coast Guard, while Halifax Shipyards obtained a contract valued at $25 billion to supply the Navy. Each ship is worth $1 billion. The Davie bid was only for the Coast Guard contract. Davie had only 15 employees during this time. Provincial politicians had no power over the bidding process due to the federal nature of the contracts. DSME canceled its involvement in the joint venture at this loss. SNC-Lavalin withdrew from the joint venture in May 2012, under a cloud of controversy, as its CEO had resigned in March 2012.

Upper Lakes, which was at the time the only owner of the yard, sold it in November 2012 to Inocea of the UK.

=== Inocea ownership ===
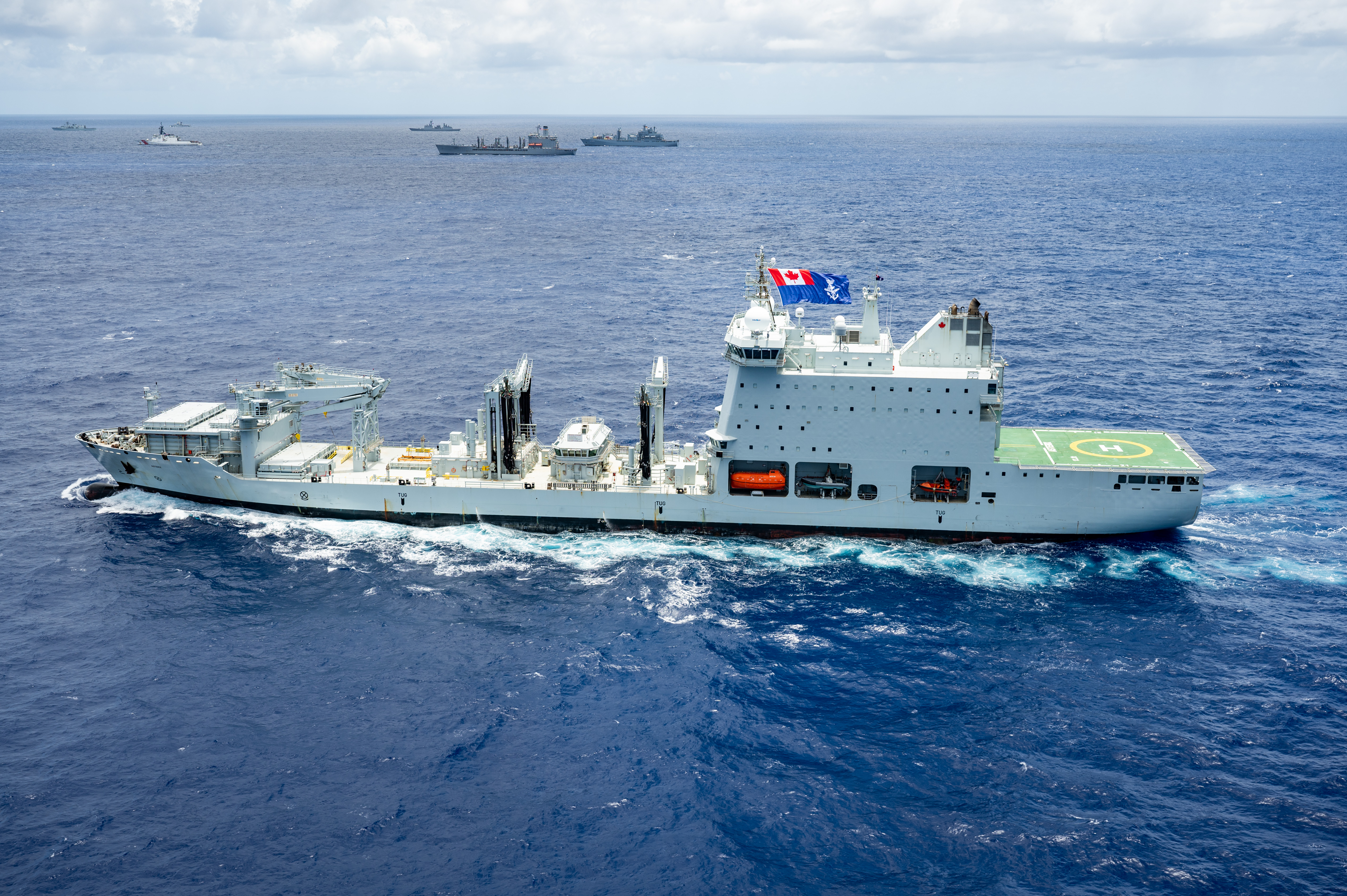
MV Asterix, delivered in 2018

Davie launched MV Cecon Pride in October 2013; it was the first ship launched from the yard in over a decade. Davie CEO Alan Bowen said "This is a great day for Davie. There are only a handful of shipyards across the globe, mainly in Europe, capable of building a vessel to this specification and with this level of technology." It was the 717th ship built at the yard. The 130-metre (427 ft) vessel was scheduled for final delivery to Cecon ASA in February 2014. "It's used for multi-purpose applications. From pipe laying to subsea construction to deep sea well intervention, it's really about the deep sea," said Alex Vicefield, chairman of the shipyard. Export Development Canada forgave a loan to Cecon ASA of approximately $216 million during the Zafiro-Cecon sale process, which had tied up for many years three partly finished keels: the above-mentioned Cecon Pride, Sovereign and Excellence.

In 2014, Minister of Public Works and Government Services Diane Finley turned down Davie's bid to build Canada's next icebreaker, saying that the $500 million that the firm's fixed price offer would save the taxpayer over the Seaspan bid was rejected "based on the credibility, the viability, the reliability of the companies".

In 2018, Davie delivered MV Asterix, a combat support ship, for Federal Fleet Services Inc. (a sister company of Davie) who then leased the vessel to the Royal Canadian Navy.

In 2018 Davie, along with Victoria Shipyards and Halifax Shipyards, agreed to share a $7 billion contract to maintain and repair the Halifax-class frigates, and will share with Halifax six ships based on the east coast. This was later clarified as a $500 million contract for the maintenance of three east coast frigates.

In 2020, Davie was selected to become a partner in the National Shipbuilding Strategy, tasked with the completion of large icebreaker CCGS Arpatuuq and a new fleet of medium icebreakers for the Canadian Coast Guard.

== Ships built or converted ==
This is a list of ships built by Davie Shipbuilding (1825–1986). For ships built after 1986, see MIL-Davie Shipbuilding or Davie Yards Incorporated.

=== Warships ===
- Restigouche-class destroyer
  - HMCS Gatineau (DDE 236), 1953–1957
- Mackenzie-class destroyer
  - HMCS Qu'Appelle (DDE 264), 1960–1962
- Iroquois-class destroyer
  - HMCS Athabaskan (DDG 282), 1969–1970
  - HMCS Huron (DDG 281), 1969–1971
  - HMCS Algonquin (DDG 283), 1969–1971
- Bangor-class minesweeper, 1940–1942
  - HMCS Digby (J267)
  - HMCS Granby (J264)
  - HMCS Lachine (J266)
  - HMCS Melville (J263)
  - HMCS Noranda (J265)
  - HMCS Stratford (J310)
  - HMCS Trois Rivières (J269)
  - HMCS Truro (J268)
- Bay-class minesweeper, 1951–1953, 1955–1956
  - HMCS Chignecto (MCB 160)
  - HMCS Fundy (MCB 159)
  - HMCS Gaspé (MCB 143)
  - HMCS Trinity (MCB 157)
  - HMCS Ungava (MCB 148)
- Flower-class corvette, 1940
  - HMCS Baddeck (K147)
  - HMCS Brandon (K149)
  - HMCS Buctouche (K179)
  - HMCS Lévis (K115)
  - HMCS Rimouski (K121)
  - HMCS Shawinigan (K136)
  - HMCS Shediac (K110)
  - HMCS Snowberry (K166)
  - HMCS Spikenard (K198)
  - HMCS Windflower (K155)
- River-class frigate, 1943–1944
  - HMCS Buckingham (K685)
  - HMCS Carlplace (K664)
  - HMCS Charlottetown (K244)
  - HMCS Coaticook (K410)
  - HMCS Fort Erie (K670)
  - HMCS Hallowell (K666)
  - HMCS Inch Arran (K667)
  - HMCS Jonquiere (K318)
  - HMCS Lasalle (K519)
  - HMCS Lauzon (K371)
  - HMCS Penetang (K676)
  - HMCS Sea Cliff (K344)
  - HMCS Ste. Therese (K366)
  - HMCS Sussexvale (K683)
  - HMCS Toronto (K538)
  - HMCS Victoriaville (K684)
- Provider-class auxiliary vessel 1961–1962
  - HMCS Provider (AOR 508)

=== Coast Guard and other utility vessels ===
- CCGS D'Iberville, Seaway icebreaker
- CCGS Griffon, light icebreaker
- CCGS Sir Humphrey Gilbert, medium icebreaker – now as Polar Prince
- MV Cecon Pride, 2013

Ferries

- SS Canora, 1918
- SS Charlottetown, 1930
- MV Bluenose, 1956
- MV Frederick Carter, 1965

Sailing vessels

- Gananoque

== Ships built by Chantier Davie Canada ==
- MV Cecon Pride (offshore construction vessel) 2013
- AOR conversion of MS Asterix for Royal Canadian Navy, delivered in 2018
- STQ Dual LNG-MDO ferry for the Société des traversiers du Québec, with delivery expected in 2018
- MV Algocape (Bulk carrier) 1966
- MV Algosteel (Bulk carrier) 1966

== Historic legacy ==
The shipyard in Lauzon, Quebec was designated a National Historic Site of Canada in 1990.
