= TECO Maritime =

TECO Chemicals AS
- Company type: Public (OSE: TECO)
- Industry: Ship Service
- Founded: 1994 as Tore Enger & Co AS
- Headquarters: Bærum, Norway
- Area served: Norway
- Key people: Tore Enger (Chairman)
- Website: www.tecomaritime.com

TECO Maritime Group AS (OSE: TECO) is a specialist supplier of technical services to the maritime industry. TECO offer voyage repair and maintenance services onboard vessels, whilst they are in service.

TECO Group ASA acquired Davie Shipbuilding of Canada and renamed as Davie Yards Inc in 2006.
