= Gananoque (ship) =

1857 Canadian wood-hulled clipper ship

History
- Namesake: Gananoque, Canada
- Owner: 1857–c1858: unknown, Quebec; c1858–1867: Thomas Bailey, Brixton, London; 1867–1874: William Johnston, Newcastle upon Tyne; 1875–c1877: Augustus William Harvey, St John's, Newfoundland; c1877–1880s: James Cochran, Belfast
- Port of registry: (United Kingdom) Quebec, Liverpool, London, Newcastle, St John's, Belfast
- Route: New Zealand Packet (1860s)
- Builder: George T. Davie & Sons, Lauzon
- Launched: 1857
- Completed: 1857
- In service: 12 February 1858 (London)
- Identification: British ON 33377
- Fate: Sunk

General characteristics
- Tons burthen: 785
- Length: 158.1 ft (48.2 m)
- Beam: 32.6 ft (9.9 m)
- Draught: 19 ft (5.8 m)
- Depth of hold: 21.1 ft (6.4 m)
- Sail plan: Full-rigged clipper ship, later Barque
- Notes: wood-hulled

Gananoque was a wood-hulled clipper ship of 785 tons, built in Quebec in 1857, that made a number of emigrant voyages to New Zealand. She had two serious collisions with icebergs in the North Atlantic, the second of which caused her loss.

== History ==
Gananoque was built at Lauzon, Quebec in 1857 by George T Davie & Sons and sold the following year to Thomas Bailey of Newcastle upon Tyne. In May 1858 he sold a one-eighth share in the ship to Archibald Morris who became her commander.

=== New Zealand trade ===
She made four voyages to New Zealand in the 1860s under contract to the provincial governments. The ship was first chartered by Willis, Gann & Company for a voyage from London to New Zealand in 1860 and then for three more by Shaw, Savill and Company. The first three carried government immigrants; the fourth voyage was solely with cargo:

- 9 February 1860 departing London, arriving Lyttelton on 9 May 1860.
- 7 July 1861 departing London, arriving Auckland on 18 October 1861.
- 7 December 1862 departing London, arriving Port Chalmers, Otago on 12 March 1863.
- 16 May 1864 departing London, arriving Port of Bluff on 5 September 1864.

=== Later history ===
In 1867 Gananoque was sold to William Johnson of Newcastle upon Tyne. On 11 July 1874, on a voyage from Quebec to Newcastle, she struck an iceberg off Cape Race. Crew abandoned ship and all but one were rescued. However, the ship did not sink, was found abandoned and taken derelict to St John's, Newfoundland.

She was subsequently repaired, re-sheathed and re-rigged as a barque, and was offered for sale in 1876.

Gananoque again collided with an iceberg on 10 May 1881 four miles off Bird Rocks, Magdalen Islands on a voyage from Belfast to Miramichi and sank quickly. The crew landed on Bird Rocks, and were picked up from there on 12 May.

== Case law ==
The first voyage to New Zealand resulted in a High Court of Admiralty case "The Gananoque", a dispute between the ship's captain Archibald Morris and the other owners over contract payment terms. The judgement was "The law will presume that the terms of a master's engagement for one voyage extent to a succeeding voyage performed without a new agreement express or clearly implied."
