= James B. Waldram =

Canadian academic (born 1955)

- Born: 1955 (age 70–71)

Academic background
- Education: BA, Anthropology, 1978, University of Waterloo; MA, Anthropology, 1980, University of Manitoba; PhD, Anthropology, 1983, University of Connecticut
- Thesis: The impact of hydro-electric development upon a northern Manitoba native community. (1983)

James Burgess Waldram FRSC (born 1955) is a Canadian medical anthropologist. He is a Distinguished Professor in the Department of Archaeology and Anthropology at the University of Saskatchewan.

== Early life and education ==
Waldram was born in 1955. He received his Bachelor of Arts degree in anthropology from the University of Waterloo in 1978 and his Master's degree in Anthropology from the University of Manitoba in 1980. Following this, he earned his PhD in anthropology from the University of Connecticut in 1983.

== Career ==
Following his PhD, Waldram joined the faculty at the University of Saskatchewan (USask) in 1983, where he established Saskatchewan's first Department of Native Studies. In 1999, he transferred to the department of psychology and in 2009 he was appointed a joint member of the departments of archaeology and anthropology. As a professor, he received a four-year grant to study how sexual offenders, both aboriginal and non aboriginal, experience, interpret and respond to psychological treatment they receive in federal penitentiaries. Waldram later published Revenge of the Windigo: The Construction of the Mind and Mental Health of North American Aboriginal Peoples in 2004 through the University of Toronto Press. In 2005, Waldram was named a Champion of Mental Health by the Canadian Alliance on Mental Illness and Mental Health for his work in understanding aboriginal mental health. His research culminated in the publication of Hound Pound Narrative: Sexual Offender Habilitation and the Anthropology of Therapeutic Intervention in 2012.

As a result of his research in the study of Aboriginal mental health issues and the cultural bases of healing and treatment, Waldram was elected a Fellow of the Royal Society of Canada in 2014. Two years later, he was one of five national recipients of Social Sciences and Humanities Research Council of Canada (SSHRC) Impact Awards. In 2018, his work was recognized by the USask Distinguished Professorship Advisory Committee for being "of the highest caliber" and "contributing significantly to the enhancement of knowledge in the fields of medical anthropology and Indigenous studies." As a result, Waldram was given the title of Distinguished Professor at USask.

== Selected publications ==
- Aboriginal Health in Canada (1995)
- The Way of the Pipe: Aboriginal Spirituality and Symbolic Healing in Canadian Prisons (1997)
- Revenge of the Windigo: The Construction of the Mind and Mental Health of North American Aboriginal Peoples (2004)
- Hound Pound Narrative: Sexual Offender Habilitation and the Anthropology of Therapeutic Intervention (2012)
