= CFAV Cougar =

CFAV Cougar is the name of the following ships of the Royal Canadian Navy:

- CFAV Cougar (YAG 308), a YAG training vessel in service 1954–2007
- CFAV Cougar (PCT 61), an Orca-class patrol vessel launched in 2008

== See also ==
- HMCS Cougar
- Cougar (disambiguation)
