= Grizzly (disambiguation) =

The grizzly or grizzly bear (Ursus arctos horriblis) is the great brown bear of North America.

Grizzly may also refer to:

== Bears ==
- California grizzly (U. a. californicus), the recently extinct subspecies of CLADE IV in the Far West and symbol of the State of California
- Kodiak bear (U. a. middendorffi), the grizzly of Alaska's ABC islands, hybrid with the polar bear
- Mainland grizzly (U. a. horribilis), representing most of North America
- Mexican grizzly bear (Ursus arctos; formerly Ursus arctos nelsoni) is an extinct population of grizzly native to Mexico
- Peninsular grizzly (U. a. gyas), indigenous to Alaska's southwestern peninsula

== Geography ==
- Grizzly Bay, San Francisco, California, United States
- Grizzly Butte, a volcano in British Columbia, Canada
- Grizzly Creek (disambiguation)
- Grizzly Mountain (disambiguation)
- Grizzly Peak (disambiguation)
- Grizzly Reservoir in Colorado, U.S.

== Military ==
- AVGP Grizzly, a Canadian armoured personnel carrier
- CFAV Grizzly, auxiliary ships of the Royal Canadian Navy
- HMCS Grizzly, an armed yacht of the Royal Canadian Navy
- Grizzly combat engineering vehicle, a combat engineering vehicle variant of the M1 Abrams tank
- Grizzly APC, an American armored personnel carrier
- KMW Grizzly, a German armored vehicle produced beginning 2007
- Yamaha Grizzly 600, a large utility all-terrain vehicle
- Grizzly I cruiser tank, a Canadian-built M4A1 Sherman tank variant
- Airbus A400M "Grizzly", a military transport aircraft
- Beechcraft XA-38 Grizzly, a prototype World War II ground attack aircraft
- Boeing EA-18G Growler, American carrier-based electronic warfare aircraft, whose radio name during flight operations is "Grizzly"
- Buk missile system, the versions Buk-M1-2 and Buk-M2 had the NATO reporting name of SA-17 "Grizzly"
- Grizzly, the nickname of the 40th Armored Division (United States)
- Forward Operating Base Grizzly, a former US Army base within Camp Ashraf, Iraq

== Arts and entertainment ==
- Grizzly (film), a 1976 horror film
- Into the Grizzly Maze, a 2014 action film briefly called Grizzly during production
- Grizzly (We Bare Bears), fictional grizzly bear character
- Grizzly (comics), four unrelated Marvel Comics characters
- Grizzly (novel), a novel in Gary Paulsen's World of Adventure series
- The Grizzly (novel), a 1964 coming-of-age young adult adventure novel by Annabel and Edgar Johnson
- Grizzly (studio), a Japanese animation studio
- The Grizzly, a minor musical side project of Adam Young
- Task Force Grizzly, a USMC Force Recon task force in the video game Medal of Honor: Warfighter
- Grizzly (album), a 2025 album by Slaughter to Prevail

== Roller coasters ==
- Grizzly (Kings Dominion), a wooden roller coaster at Kings Dominion, Doswell, Virginia
- The Grizzly, a wooden roller coaster at California's Great America
- Grizzly, the previous name of the Timber Terror, a wooden roller coaster at Silverwood Theme Park

== People ==
- James "Grizzly" Adams (1812–1860), American mountain man
- Rick "Grizzly" Brown (1960-2002), American participant in the 1985 and 1986 World's Strongest Man competitions

== Other uses ==
- Grizzly (tobacco)
- Fiat Grizzly and Fiat Grizzly Fastback, compact crossover SUVs
- LAR Grizzly Win Mag, a handgun
- Grizzly (.22-caliber rifle), a 3D printed rifle
- Rutan Grizzly, a tandem-wing STOL research aircraft designed by Burt Rutan, first flown in 1982
- Project Grizzly (software), a webserver component of the GlassFish Java EE Server
- Grizzly screen, a grid used for separating rocks of different size

== See also ==
- Grizzly bear (disambiguation)
- Grizzlies (disambiguation), a list of sports teams
- Tee Grizzley, American rapper
- Grizzle, a surname
- Grizzy (disambiguation)
- Grizz (disambiguation)
