= CFAV Grizzly =

CFAV Grizzly is the name of the following ships of the Royal Canadian Navy:

- CFAV Grizzly (YAG 306), an auxiliary vessel in service 1954–2007
- CFAV Grizzly (PCT 60), an Orca-class patrol vessel launched in 2008

== See also ==
- HMCS Grizzly
- Grizzly (disambiguation)
