= CFAV Caribou =

CFAV Caribou is the name of the following ships of the Royal Canadian Navy:

- CFAV Caribou (YAG 314), a YAG training vessel in service 1954–2007
- CFAV Caribou (PCT 57), an Orca-class patrol vessel launched in 2007

== See also ==
- HMCS Caribou
- Caribou (disambiguation)
