= CFAV Badger =

Canadian naval training ship (1954–2007)

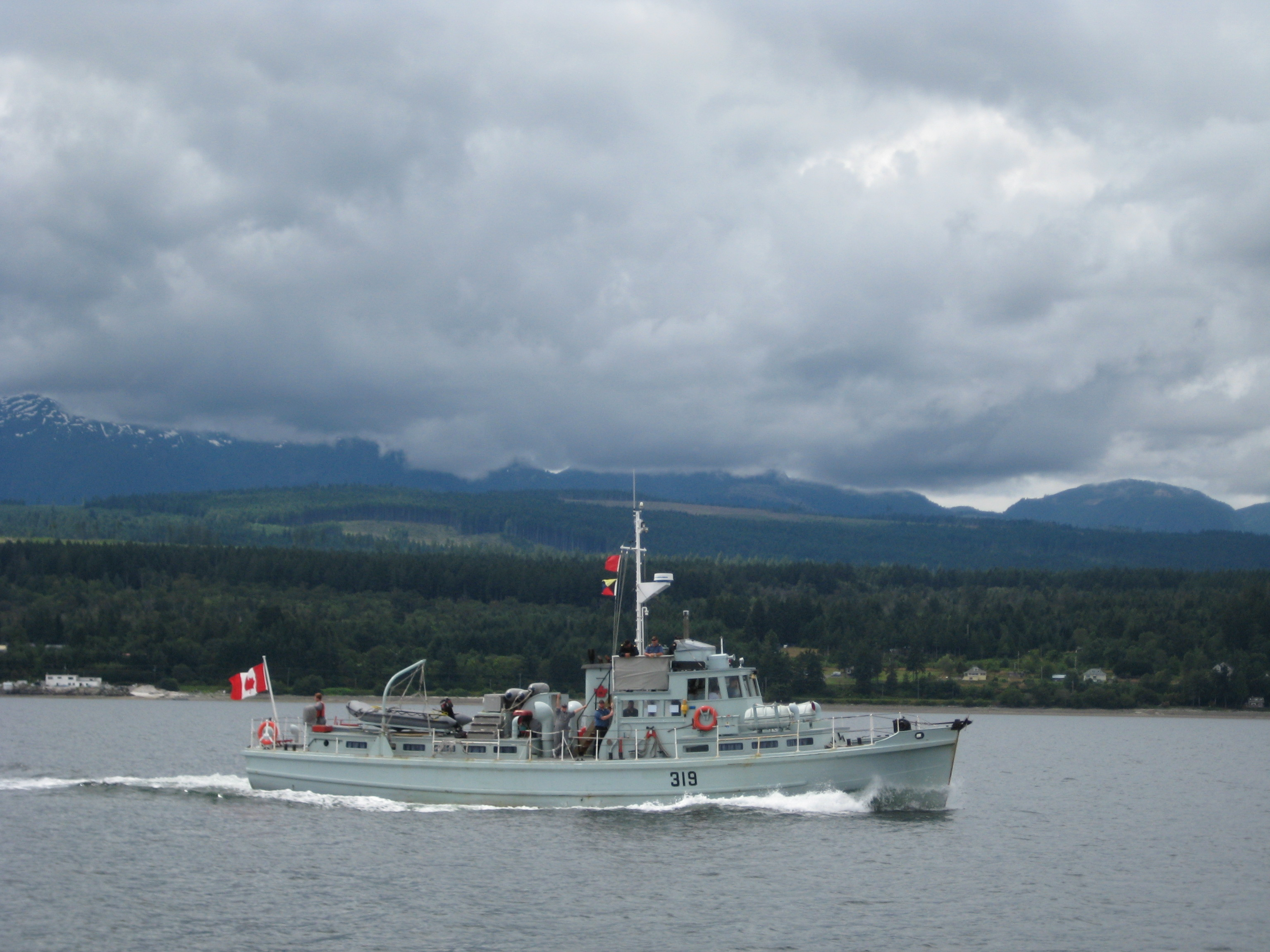
- CFAV Badger in 2007

History

Canada
- Operator: Royal Canadian Navy
- Builder: Withey's Shipyards, Silva Bay
- Launched: 1954
- In service: 1954
- Out of service: 2007
- Home port: CFB Esquimalt
- Identification: YFM-319 (1955); YFP-319 (1960); YAG-319 Badger (1980)
- Fate: Sold, 2011

General characteristics
- Type: Training vessel
- Displacement: 70 tonnes (69 long tons)
- Length: 75 ft 3 in (22.94 m)
- Beam: 18 ft (5.5 m)
- Draught: 2.6 m (8 ft 6 in)
- Installed power: Yanmar diesel generator
- Propulsion: 2 × Detroit Diesel 6-71 series engines, 320 hp (239 kW)
- Boats & landing craft carried: Zodiac launch
- Complement: 12 - 14

Canadian Forces Auxiliary Vessel (CFAV) Badger (YAG-319) was one of ten wooden YAG-300 (Yard Auxiliary, General) vessels built for the Royal Canadian Navy (RCN) between 1953 and 1955. Built for use as auxiliary craft, Badger primarily served as an at-sea training platform for junior naval officers, boatswains, reserve personnel and Sea Cadets at Canadian Forces Base (CFB) Esquimalt.

== Design and layout ==
Like other YAG 300 vessels, Badger was 75 ft (23 m) long overall, 18 ft 6 in (5.64 m) wide, had a draft of 4 ft 6 in (1.37 m), measured 70 tonnes, and was powered by twin 6‑71 Detroit Diesel engines. Badger was arranged in typical naval fashion with officers housed forward with the galley and their own head, an engine room midships, and cadet room aft with 12–14 bunks in double tiers. The heads are equipped with a pump-action lever, that can be used to pump sewage into the black water treatment tanks held aboard or into the ocean water. Above decks was the wheelhouse mounted on the forward cabin's coaming; aft of that, the exposed breezeway; and, mounted on the after cabin's coaming, a Zodiac launch as well as a food locker and barbeque. Above the wheelhouse was an open bridge, fitted with a chart table and a gyrocompass repeater. A second gyro repeater was fitted on the quarterdeck. Badger was equipped with a small navigation radar, with the display located in the wheelhouse.

== Operational history ==
In 1954 she was built for the RCN as YFM-319 (Yard Ferry, Man) and served as a harbour ferry boat. In 1960 she was re-designated as YFP-319 (Yard Ferry, Personnel) and in 1967 she was transferred to Vancouver to serve as a training tender with HMCS Discovery Canadian Forces Naval Reserve Division. In the 1980s she was renamed YAG-319 (Badger) and regrouped under the control and operation of the Small Boats Unit (SBU) at HMC Dockyard Esquimalt where she was used for seamanship and navigation training until 2007. Badger was offered for sale by the Canadian Government as part of the YAG 300 Replacement Project, which saw the YAG boats replaced by new Orca-class patrol vessels. In 2011 Badger was sold to a West Coast fisherman for $4,680.00 CAD and restored for use by a travel adventure company offering tours of the Barkley Sound, Clayoquot Sound, and Nootka.

== Gallery ==
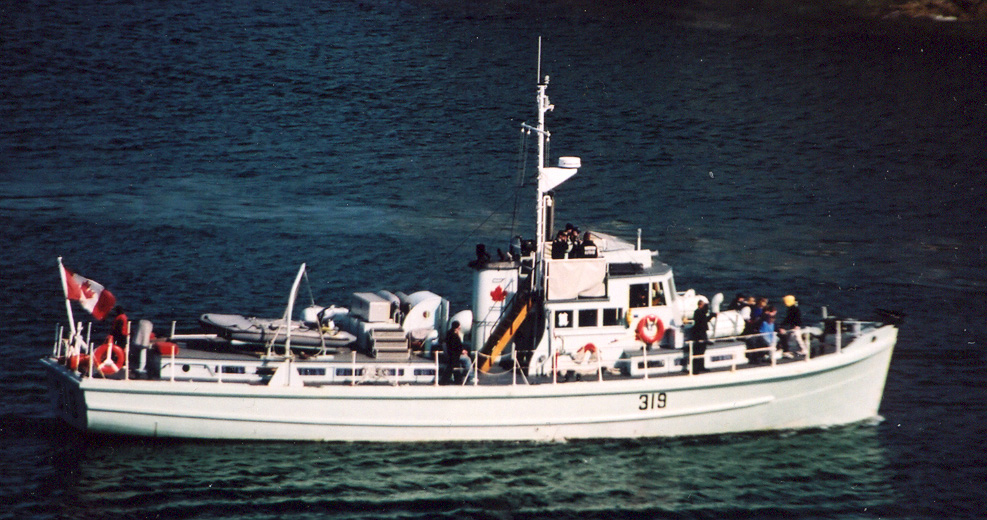
CFAV "Badger" (YAG 319)
