= CFAV Grizzly (YAG 306) =

Canadian naval training ship (1954–2007)

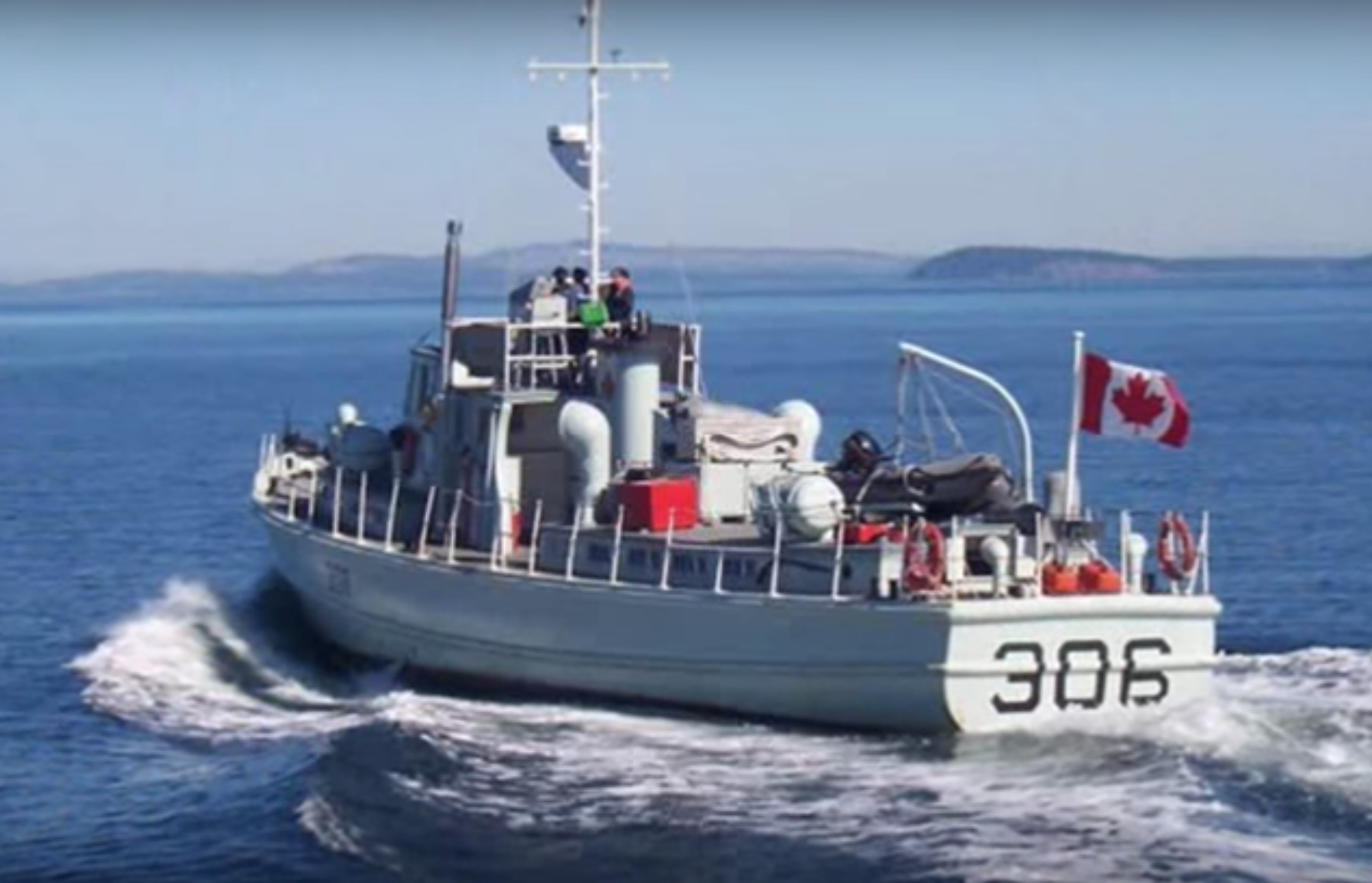
- CFAV Grizzly in 2007

History

Canada
- Name: Grizzly
- Operator: Royal Canadian Navy
- Builder: Withey's Shipyards, Silva Bay
- Launched: 1954
- In service: 1954
- Out of service: 2007
- Home port: CFB Esquimalt
- Identification: YFM-306 (1954); YFP-306 (1960); YAG-306 Grizzly (1980)
- Fate: Sold, 2011

General characteristics
- Type: Training vessel
- Displacement: 70 tonnes (69 long tons)
- Length: 75 ft 3 in (22.94 m)
- Beam: 18 ft (5.5 m)
- Draught: 2.6 m (8 ft 6 in)
- Installed power: Yanmar diesel generator
- Propulsion: 2 × Detroit Diesel 6-71 series engines, 320 hp (239 kW)
- Speed: 10 knots (19 km/h; 12 mph)
- Boats & landing craft carried: Zodiac launch
- Complement: 12 - 14

Canadian Forces Auxiliary Vessel (CFAV) Grizzly (YAG 306) was one of ten wooden YAG 300 (Yard Auxiliary, General) vessels built for the Royal Canadian Navy (RCN) between 1953 and 1955. Built for use as auxiliary craft, Grizzly primarily served as an at-sea training platform for junior naval officers, boatswains, reserve personnel and Sea Cadets at Canadian Forces Base (CFB) Esquimalt. Her name perpetuated the World War II armed yacht HMCS Grizzly and was reused for Grizzly, an Orca-class patrol vessel which replaced the YAG 300 vessels as the RCN training tenders in 2008.

== Design and layout ==
Like other YAG 300 vessels, Grizzly was 75 feet (23 m) long overall, 18 feet 6 inches (5.64 m) wide, had a draught of 4 feet 6 inches (1.37 m), displaced 70 tonnes (69 long tons), and was powered by twin 6-71 Detroit Diesel engines. Grizzly was arranged in typical naval fashion with officer's housed forward with the galley and their own head, an engine room amidships, and cadet room aft with 12–14 bunks in double tiers. The heads are equipped with a pump-action lever, that can be used to pump sewage into the black water treatment tanks held aboard or into the ocean water. Above decks was the wheelhouse mounted on the forward cabin's coaming; aft of that, the exposed breezeway; and, mounted on the after cabin's coaming, a Zodiac launch as well as a food locker and barbeque. Above the wheelhouse was an open bridge, fitted with a chart table and a gyrocompass repeater. A second gyro repeater was fitted on the quarterdeck. Grizzly was equipped with a small navigation radar, with the display located in the wheelhouse.

== Operational history ==
In 1954 she was built for the RCN as YFM 306 (Yard Ferry, Man) and served as a harbour ferry boat. Re-designated as YFP 306 (Yard Ferry, Personnel) in 1960, she was transferred to reserve status due to defence budget cuts. Returned to service in the mid-1960s, Grizzly was re-designated as a YAG and in 1976 she was assigned to HMCS Discovery Naval Reserve Division as a tender. Grizzly served as a training vessel for regular and reserve forces until she was removed from service in 2007. She was sold in 2011 to private interests.
