= Grisly =

Grisly is a word meaning horrifying, repellent or gruesome. It may refer to:

- Grisly Steevens, nickname of Griselda Steevens (1653–1746), Irish philanthropist
- The Grisly Folk, short story by H G Wells
- The Grisly Wife, novel by Rodney Hall

== See also ==
- Grizzly (disambiguation)
