= CFAV Caribou (YAG 314) =

Canadian naval training ship (1954–2007)

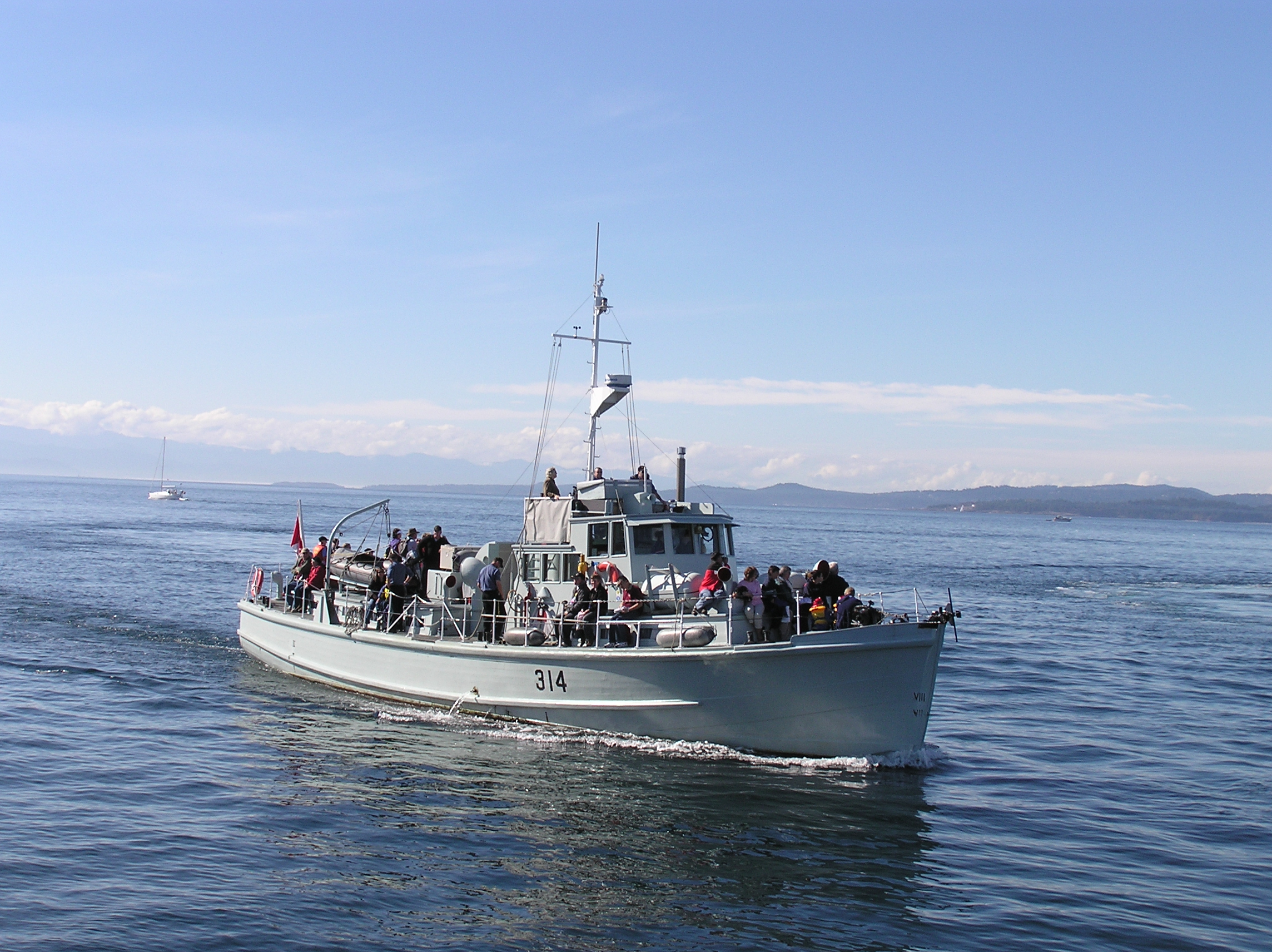
- CFAV Caribou in 2006

History

Canada
- Operator: Royal Canadian Navy (1954–1960); Royal Canadian Air Force (1960–1978); Royal Canadian Navy (1978–2007)
- Builder: Withey's Shipyards, Silva Bay
- Launched: 1954
- In service: 1954
- Out of service: 2007
- Home port: CFB Esquimalt
- Identification: YFM-314 (1954); YFP-314 (1960); NIMPKISH II M.875 (1960); YAG-314 (1978); YAG-314 Caribou (1980)
- Fate: Sold, 2011

Canada
- Name: MV Tamarind
- Acquired: 2017
- Status: Active

General characteristics
- Type: Training vessel
- Displacement: 70 tonnes (69 long tons)
- Length: 75 ft 3 in (22.94 m)
- Beam: 18 ft (5.5 m)
- Draught: 2.6 m (8 ft 6 in)
- Installed power: Yanmar diesel generator
- Propulsion: 2 × Detroit Diesel 6-71 series engines, 320 hp (239 kW)
- Boats & landing craft carried: Zodiac launch
- Complement: 12 - 14

Canadian Forces Auxiliary Vessel (CFAV) Caribou (YAG 314) was one of ten wooden YAG-300 (Yard Auxiliary, General) vessels built for the Royal Canadian Navy (RCN) between 1953 and 1955. Built for use as auxiliary craft, Caribou primarily served as an at-sea training platform for junior naval officers, boatswains, reserve personnel and Sea Cadets at Canadian Forces Base (CFB) Esquimalt.

Her name was reused for PTC 57 Caribou Orca-class Patrol Craft (PCT) vessel that replaced the YAG 300 vessels as the RCN training tenders in 2008.

== Design and layout ==
Like other YAG 300 vessels, Caribou was 75′ long overall, 18′6″ wide, had a draft of 4′6″, measured 70 tonnes, and was powered by twin 6-71 Detroit Diesel engines. Caribou was arranged in typical naval fashion with officer's housed forward with the galley and their own head, an engine room midships, and cadet room aft with 12-14 bunks in double tiers. The heads are equipped with a pump-action lever, that can be used to pump sewage into the black water treatment tanks held aboard or into the ocean water. Above decks was the wheelhouse mounted on the forward cabin's coaming; aft of that, the exposed breezeway; and, mounted on the after cabin's coaming, a Zodiac launch as well as a food locker and barbeque. Above the wheelhouse was an open bridge, fitted with a chart table and a gyrocompass repeater. A second gyro repeater was fitted on the quarterdeck. Caribou was equipped with a small navigation radar, with the display located in the wheelhouse.

== Operational history ==
In 1954 she was built for the RCN as YFM 314 (Yard Ferry, Man) and served as a harbour ferry boat. Re-designated as YFP 314 (Yard Ferry, Personnel) in 1960, she was transferred to the Royal Canadian Airforce (RCAF) and renamed M.975 Nimpkish II. With the RCAF she was used to ferry personnel and supplies from Coal Harbour, Vancouver to the No. 501 Aircraft Control & Warning Squadron at RCAF Radar Station at Holberg, British Columbia. In 1965 Caribou was transferred to the Navy administratively, but remained at Holberg. In November 1975 Caribou transported 369 people from Port Alice, British Columbia after a mudslide forced the evacuation of many residents.

In 1978 Caribou was returned to the Maritime Command as a torpedo recovery vessel and classed as an Orca-class patrol boat. Later in 1978 Caribou was assigned to the CFB Comox Sea Survival School and renamed YAG 314. In 1980 she was renamed YAG 314 (Caribou), unofficially known as CFAV Caribou, and moved to CFB Esquimalt where she was used for seamanship and navigation training until 2007. Caribou was offered for sale by the Canadian Government in 2011 as part of the YAG 300 Replacement Project, which saw the YAG boats replaced by new Orca-class patrol vessels. Caribou was sold to and refurbished into a recreational cruising vessel by G.W Kleaman Marine Services Ltd of North Vancouver in 2011. In 2017, Caribou was sold and renamed MV Tamarind by private entrepreneurs offering coastal and celestial navigation services off the coast of Vancouver, British Columbia.
