= Cougar (disambiguation) =

A cougar is a large cat species.

Cougar, The Cougar, Cougars or The Cougars may also refer to:

== Bands ==
- Cougar (band), an instrumental band from Madison, Wisconsin
- Cougars (band), an indie rock band from Chicago, Illinois
- The Cougars, a rock band from Bristol, UK

== Characters ==
- Cougar (comics), a superhero
- Jean-Luc Cougar, the player character from the video game WinBack
- Straight Cougar, a Japanese cartoon character

== Computing ==
- Windows Small Business Server 2008, server software codenamed "Cougar"
- HP 100LX, a palmtop PC codenamed "Project Cougar"

== People ==
- Cougar Annie (1888–1983), pioneer of British Columbia
- John Mellencamp (born 1951), American rock musician with the former stage names "Johnny Cougar", "John Cougar" and "John Cougar-Mellencamp"

== Places ==
- Cougar, Washington, an unincorporated community in Cowlitz County
- Cougar Dam, a hydroelectric dam in Oregon
  - Cougar Reservoir, a reservoir in Oregon

== Sports teams ==
- BYU Cougars, Brigham Young University
- Charleston Cougars, College of Charleston
- Chicago State Cougars, Chicago State University
- Houston Cougars, University of Houston
- Kane County Cougars, minor league baseball team from Geneva, Illinois
- Keighley Cougars, rugby team from Keighley, West Yorkshire
- Lübeck Cougars, American football team from Lübeck, Germany
- Prince George Cougars, junior ice hockey team from Prince George, British Columbia
- Raleigh Cougars, USBL basketball team
- SIU Edwardsville Cougars, Southern Illinois University Edwardsville
- Velez Cougars, Velez College in Cebu City, Philippines
- Washington State Cougars, Washington State University

== Television ==
- "Cougars" (30 Rock), a 2007 television episode
- The Cougar (TV series), an American reality show
- Cougar Club, a 2007 American film
- Cougar Town, an American sitcom

== Transport ==
=== Airplanes ===
- Grumman F-9 Cougar, an American naval jet fighter
- Gulfstream American GA-7 Cougar, a twin-engined light aircraft

=== Automobiles ===
- Ford Cougar, a European automobile release
- Mercury Cougar, an automobile

=== Fighting vehicles ===
- Cougar (vehicle), an armored military vehicle used by U.S. and British forces
- AVGP Cougar, a Canadian armored fighting vehicle

=== Helicopters ===
- Cougar Helicopters, a helicopter company
- Eurocopter AS532 Cougar, a helicopter

=== Mass transportation ===
- ACE Cougar, a bus

=== Ships ===
- CFAV Cougar, auxiliary ships of the Royal Canadian Navy
- HMCS Cougar (Z15), a Royal Canadian Navy patrol vessel in commission from 1940 to 1945
- SS Cougar (previously Empire Cougar and other names), a cargo ship in service 1919–51

=== Other vehicles ===
- Claas Cougar, a large self-propelled mower

== Other uses ==
- Cougar (slang), an older woman who dates much younger men and/or women
- Cougar Energy, Australian energy company
- Beretta Cougar, series of Beretta pistols
- The Daily Cougar (formerly The Cougar), a student newspaper at the University of Houston
- Cougar (horse)

== See also ==
- Cougaar, a distributed multi-agent computer architecture
