= YAG =

YAG, YaG, Yağ, or yag can refer to:

- Yttrium aluminium garnet, a synthetic crystal used in solid-state laser systems
- Fort Frances Municipal Airport, Ontario, Canada, IATA code
- YMCA Youth and Government, a model government program for youth
- Yahgan language, spoken in Chile and Argentina, ISO 639 code
- Cansu Yağ (born 1990), a female Turkish footballer
- YAG training vessels, wooden Canadian Navy boats 1954–1955
- District auxiliary, miscellaneous (YAG), US Navy hull classification symbol
