= Machigonne =

Machigonne may refer to

- Portland, Maine, which was formerly known as Machigonne to the indigenous people of the region
- Machigonne (yacht), a yacht that served in both the United States and Royal Canadian navies
- Yankee (ferry), a ship in New York harbor also known as Machigonne (and listed on the U.S. National Register of Historic Places under the Machigonne name).
