= Grizzy =

Grizzy may refer to as:

- Grizzy & the Lemmings, a French CGI animated series which began in 2016
- Grizzy, a Sesame Street character appearing in The Adventures of Elmo in Grouchland
- Grizel Cochrane (17th century), a legendary Scottish folk hero

== See also ==
- Grizzly (disambiguation)
