= Grizz =

Grizz, Griz or Gryz may refer to:

== Entertainment ==
=== Fictional characters ===
- Grizz (We Bare Bears), grizzly bear cartoon character
- Grizz Griswold, character in the 30 Rock TV series
- Gryz Pyke, character in Phantasy Star IV: The End of the Millennium
- Grizz (Gareth) Visser, character in The Society (TV series)
- Mr. Grizz, a character in the Splatoon series of video games
- Grizz, a character in the 2026 animated sports film Goat, voiced by Jelly Roll

=== Music ===
- Griz (musician) (born 1990), US-based electronic artist
- Grizz, a 2001 EP by Harkonen
- The Ol' Grizz, a 2026 song by Primus

=== Television ===
- Grizz Chapman (1974–2026), American TV actor

== Sports ==
- Alex "Grizz" Wyllie (born 1944), New Zealand rugby player and coach
- Memphis Grizzlies, a National Basketball Association team in Memphis, Tennessee
  - Grizz, the mascot for the Memphis Grizzlies
- Montana Grizzlies, or Griz, University of Montana college sports teams
- Grizz, the mascot for the Oakland University Golden Grizzlies

== Other uses ==
- Yitzchak Zev Soloveitchik (1886–1959), a rabbi known as Gaon Rabbi Yitzchok Zev (GRYZ)

== See also ==
- Grizzly (disambiguation)
