= Grizzly bear (disambiguation) =

The grizzly bear (Ursus arctos ssp.) is the great brown bear of North America.

Grizzly Bear may also refer to:

== Geography ==
- Grizzly Bear Lake, Grand Teton National Park, Wyoming, United States
- Saoyú or Grizzly Bear Mountain, a peninsula with a flat summit, Northwest Territories, Canada - see Saoyú-ʔehdacho

== Entertainment ==
- Grizzly Bear (band), an indie band from Brooklyn, New York
- "Grizzly Bear", a 1966 single release from the album The Youngbloods' by The Youngbloods
- "Grizzly Bear", a song from the album Angus & Julia Stone by Angus & Julia Stone
- Grizzly Bear (dance), a dance from the 1900s originating in San Francisco
- "The Grizzly Bear", a song by Irving Berlin

== See also ==
- Grizzly (disambiguation)
