= Olivier Zarrouati =

French engineer and businessman (born 1958)

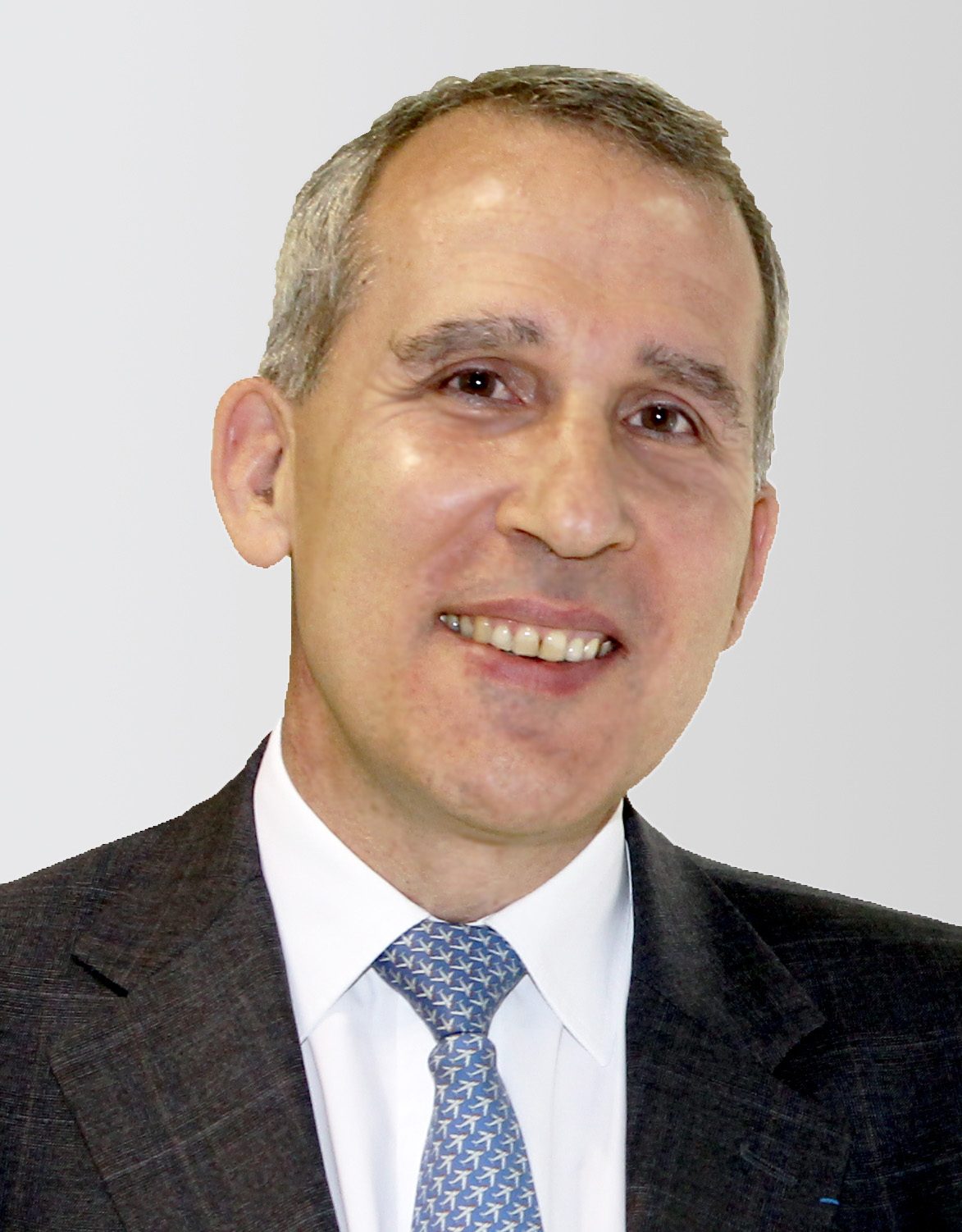
- Born: April 16, 1958 (age 68); Toulon, France
- Education: École polytechnique, SUPAERO (ISAE)
- Occupation: CEO President of directory Zodiac Aerospace

Olivier Zarrouati (born April 16, 1958, in Toulon, France) is a French engineer and businessman. From 2007 until 2017, he was chief executive officer (CEO) of Zodiac Aerospace.

== Biography ==
=== Education ===
Zarrouati, an alumnus of the Ecole Polytechnique (1980), graduated from the École nationale supérieure de l'aéronautique et de l'espace in 1982.

=== Career ===
Zarrouati started his career as a defense engineer before joining the French Space agency (Centre National d’Etudes Spatiales) from 1982 to 1988. In 1989, he joined Matra Marconi Space as project manager for earth observation satellites. In 1998, he led the Development Direction of Intertechnique which was acquired by Zodiac group in 1999. He then was CEO of Aerosafety’s segment and CEO of the Group’s aeronautical activities. Since 2007, he has been chief executive officer of Zodiac Aerospace. In October 2015, he was chosen by the Supervisory Board to for a third term of four years as CEO.

=== Other activity ===
Since 2011, Zarrouati has been president of the ISAE SUPAERO Foundation.

=== Honors ===
In 2000, he was appointed a Knight of the National Order of Merit and Knight of the Legion of Honor in 2013.
