= The Grizzly (novel) =

1964 novel by Annabel and Edgar Johnson

- Canadian Educational book cover
- Author: Annabel Johnson; Edgar Johnson
- Language: English
- Genre: coming-of-age adventure
- Publisher: Harper & Row
- Publication date: 1964
- Publication place: United States
- OCLC: 576522385

The Grizzly is a 1964 American coming-of-age young adult adventure novel written by Annabel Johnson and Edgar Johnson (typically credited on the cover art as "Annabel & Edward Johnson"). It was initially published in 1964 by Harper & Row, as well as by Fitzhenry & Whiteside in Canada. The book follows David, a resourceful but not particularly tough teenage boy, and his estranged father, Mark, as they end up stuck together in the wilderness when Mark is injured by a grizzly bear. It received mixed reviews from critics and became a book featured in Canadian schools for educational reading.

== Plot ==
David, a teenage boy, lives with his mother, Jeanne, but his father, Mark, is estranged. David often has nightmares about Mark, who was always harsh to him when he was younger; Jeanne threw Mark out after years of him pushing David into frightening activities, although now that David is older, Mark wants to get to know his son better. David dreads this but grudgingly accepts the offer of a camping trip in the wilderness with Mark. Mark is shown to be a very tough, aloof, and conservative man who thinks little of David's intellect or resilience and would prefer his son to be tough, something that leads to tension straight away. While outside, Mark is mauled and injured by a female grizzly bear, and he shoots the bear after David refuses to. Mark is surprised when David expresses knowledge of things such as treating his wounds, and the father and son gradually become closer. They also observe how much like their own family, the other bears in the woods, are and realize how childish their fighting is. David is nearly drowned while fishing for food, and Mark is frightened by this. Finally, it is revealed that Mark lost a brother to a drowning accident in his childhood, which has haunted him ever since and made him feel weak for not being able to save the deceased sibling. He and David can reach a telephone and call Jeanne, promising that one day they will take her to the wilderness with them so she can see its splendor.

== Reception ==
The Grizzly received mixed reviews from critics. Kirkus Reviews stated of the book, "the sympathetic handling of the boy's feeling under very unusual circumstances distinguishes this excellent outdoor adventure story" and praised the dynamics of David and Mark's relationship. The New York Times was more critical, stating, "there is inconsistency in characterization in that David's terror of his father, which is the motivating force of the book, seems unjustified. The man we meet is not the sort who would bully a baby, and the discrepancy between his personality and David's memories is never satisfactorily explained. However, children with a taste for outdoor stories will like the book for its physical details; the intimate descriptions of nature and camping life make the Western forest and river seem a woodsman's paradise."

The title was reprinted in 1995 by Fitzhenry & Whiteside Limited with new reading questions for Canadian students; the questions guide was written by Phillip L. King, the Chairman of English for Zion Heights Junior High School in Toronto, Ontario.
