= Grizzly Creek =

Grizzly Creek may refer to:

- Grizzly Creek Redwoods State Park
- Grizzly Creek, Contra Costa County, tributary of Las Trampas Creek
- Grizzly Creek, tributary of the Van Duzen River (California)
- Grizzly Creek, tributary of the North Fork Trinity River (California)
- Grizzly Creek, tributary of the Yuba River (California)
- Grizzly Creek, tributary of the Colorado River (Colorado)
- Grizzly Creek, tributary of the North Platte River (Nebraska)
- Grizzly Creek, tributary of the Imnaha River (Oregon )
