= Claas Cougar =

Self-propelled mower

The Claas Cougar is a self-propelled mower produced by the German agricultural machinery manufacturer Claas. The mower, which is named after the cougar, a large American cat, was first presented in 2003. Due to its maximum cutting width of 14 metres (46 ft) it is classified as the largest self-propelled mower in the world.

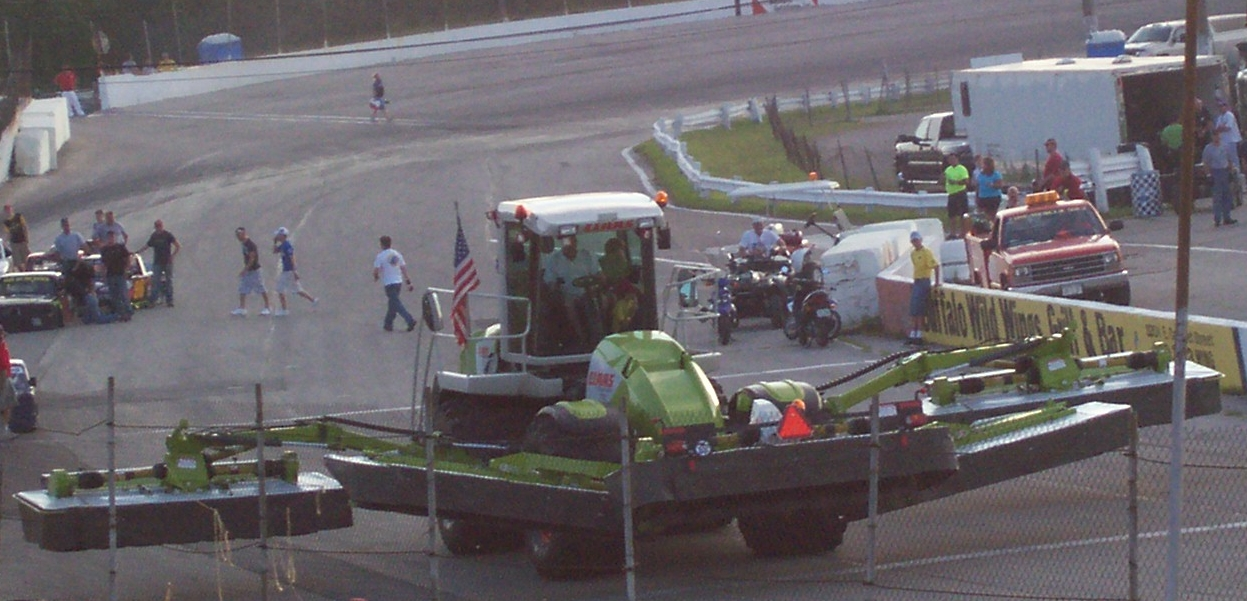
A Claas Cougar 1400 at Wisconsin International Raceway in 2008

== Dimensions and technology ==
The base model Cougar 1400 is available in different equipment variants. Generally the 4WD machine has four large wheels of equal size, it has a four-wheel steering system and also features crab steering mode. The special purpose tractor-like vehicle has a travel length of 11.5 metres (38 ft), and a travel height of about 3.96 metres (13.0 ft). Its road transport width depends on tire dimensions, and takes up from just 3 to 3.5 metres (9.8–11.5 ft).

The machine has a Daimler (Chrysler)/Mercedes-Benz OM 457 LA 6-cylinder diesel engine with a maximum output of 350 kilowatts (480 hp). The fuel tank can hold up to 960 litres (250 US gal) of diesel fuel. The Cougar's weight is – depending on equipment and the amount of loaded fuel – approximately 18,500 kilograms (40,800 lb). The machine operates at speeds up to 21 kilometres per hour (13 mph), or up to 40 kilometres per hour (25 mph) while moving between fields on roads.

Five pendulum suspended mowing units are fitted to every Claas Cougar, a triple combination at the front and one outrigger unit on each side in the middle of the machine. The two side mowers are mounted on telescoping booms between the axles. Each mowing unit can be individually controlled and maneuvered up, down, left, and right in order to mow narrow plots or smaller areas with less than five mowers, to adjust the mowers to uneven ground, and to help the operator avoid encountering obstacles. Additionally the Cougar is equipped with active hydropneumatic mower unit balancing, and the two outrigger units are equipped with hydraulic collision protection devices; they automatically swing back when they meet with obstacles.

With its five mowers the Claas Cougar can cut at widths up to 14 metres (46 ft), and it has a working capacity of up to 22 hectares (220,000 m^{2}) per hour.

To fold the mower decks for transport and to unfold them into operating position Claas uses a special hydraulic folding design. For road transport the Cougar's cab is rotated 180°, so that the lifted and folded front and side mowers are located at the vehicle's rear then. Both folding and cab rotating operations are automatically managed and can easily be activated by the driver from within the cab. They only take a few seconds or minutes. The cab is air-conditioned with airride seats and each window has its own wiper.

== History ==
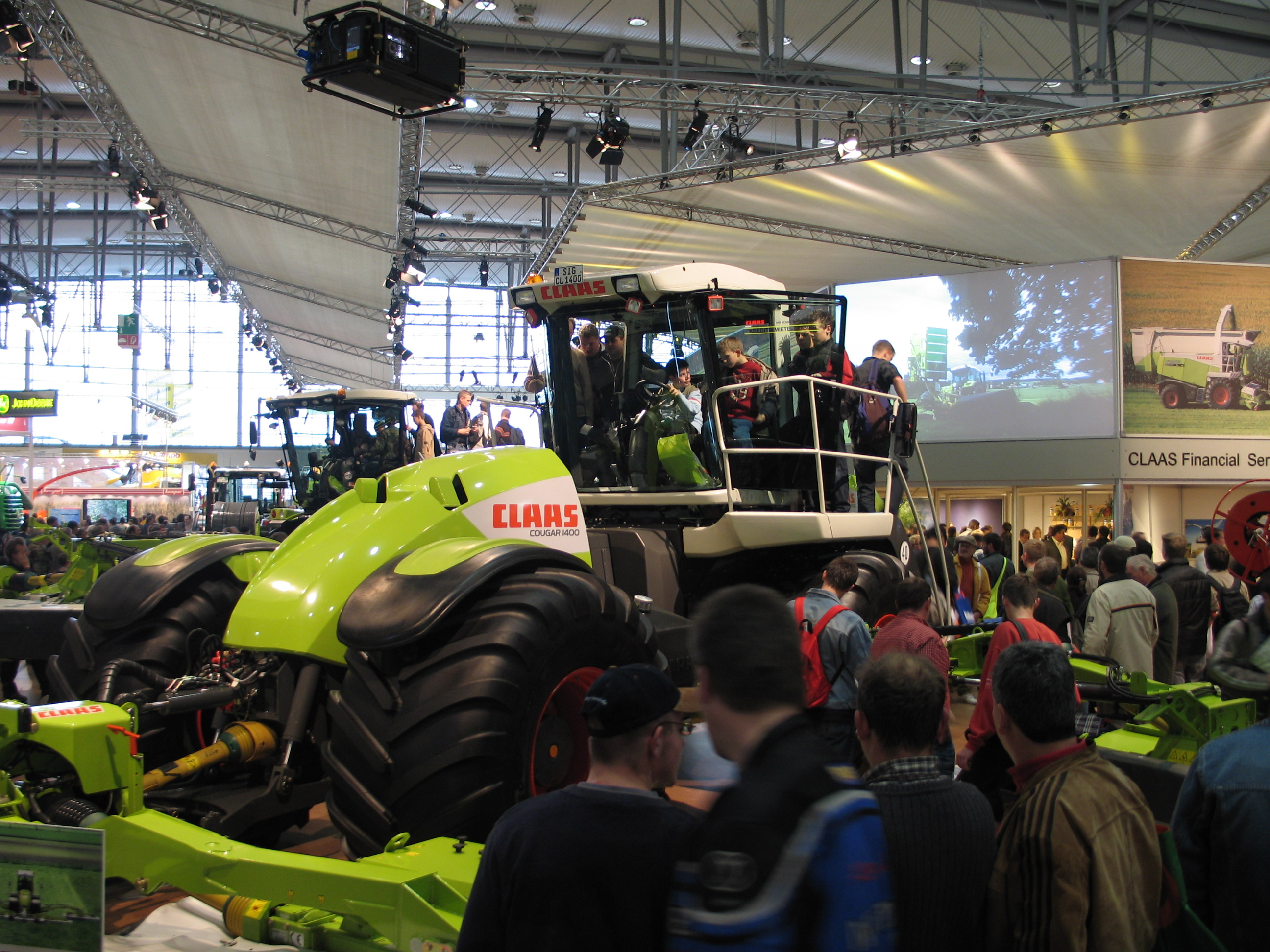
Claas Cougar 1400 presented at Agritechnica 2005

The Cougar 1400, equipped with five Claas disc mower units per default, was first presented at Agritechnica 2003 in Germany and was awarded "Machine of the Year" there. At SIMA 2005 in Paris, it was awarded a silver medal.

In 2006, Claas presented a Cougar 1400 fitted with five flail mowers (mulching units) instead of disc mowers. The machine has a working width of 12.6 metres (41 ft) then, and can be used e.g. for mulching corn stubble. The flail mower supplier Spearhead Machinery (based in Salford Priors, England) calls the combination Trident 12600 HD. This naming follows other models of their Trident range of flail mowers. The five Trident decks for the Cougar have a weight of 4,700 kilograms (10,400 lb).

Also, Claas added roller conditioners to the Cougar lineup. The mowing units of the Cougar 1400RC are equipped with roller conditioners, whereas the mowers of the Cougar 1400C have tine (roller) conditioners.

== Appearances in media ==
The Claas Cougar was featured in season 10 of the UK television magazine Fifth Gear, on October 30, 2006.
