= Grizzlies =

Grizzlies may refer to:

- Grizzly bears

== Sports ==
Sports teams named after the grizzly bear

United States:

- Memphis Grizzlies, a National Basketball Association team in Memphis, Tennessee
- Fresno Grizzlies, a Triple-A minor league baseball team based in Fresno, California
- Gateway Grizzlies, a professional baseball team based in Sauget, Illinois
- An informal name for the Memphis Southmen, a team in the former World Football League
- Fairbanks Grizzlies, a professional Indoor Football League team from Fairbanks, Alaska
- Seattle Grizzlies, an Australian Football League team based in Seattle, Washington
- Utah Grizzlies, an ice hockey team from West Valley City, Utah
- High Country Grizzlies, an AAL and NAL team in Boone, NC
- Utah Grizzlies (1995–2005), an ice hockey team based in Salt Lake City, Utah, later relocated and renamed
- Montana Grizzlies, the college sports teams of the University of Montana, Missoula
- the sports teams of Franklin College (Indiana)
- Northside Grizzlies, the sports teams of Northside High School, Fort Smith, Arkansas

Canada:

- Vancouver Grizzlies, a National Basketball Association team that played from 1995 to 2001 before relocating to Memphis
- Vancouver Grizzlies (football), a Canadian football team that played in Vancouver in 1941
- Olds Grizzlys, a Canadian ice hockey team in the Alberta Junior Hockey League

Germany:

- Ansbach Grizzlies, an American football team based in Ansbach

United Kingdom

- Old Albanian RFC Grizzlies, a St. Albans-based social rugby team

== Other uses ==
- The Grizzlies, a 2018 Canadian sports drama film
