= YAG training vessel =

Canadian Navy vessels

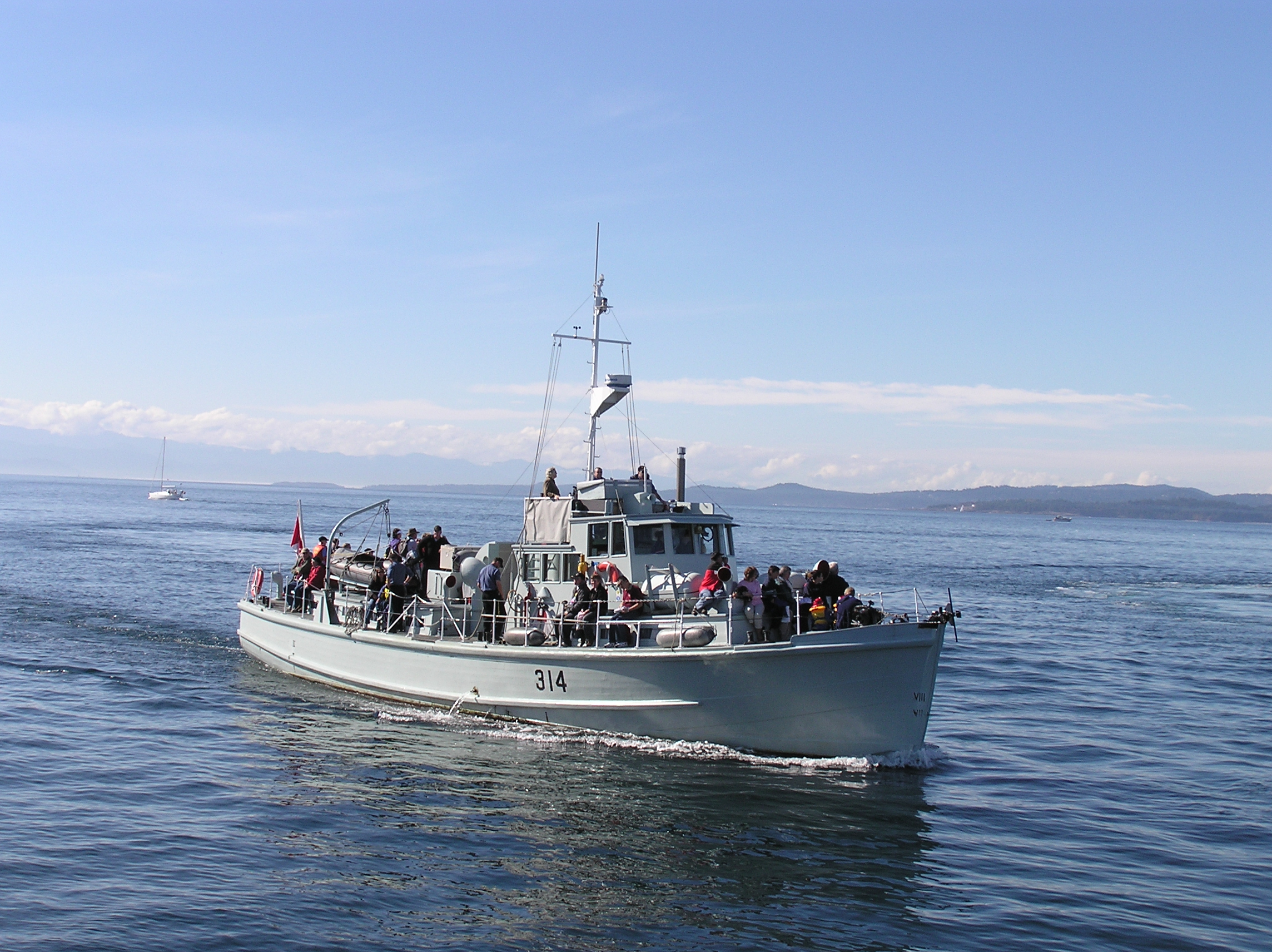
- CFAV Caribou (YAG 314)

Class overview
- Builders: Withey's Shipyard; Mercer's Shipyard
- Operators: Royal Canadian Navy
- Succeeded by: Orca-class patrol vessel
- Built: 1954–1955
- In service: 1954-2007
- Completed: 10

General characteristics
- Type: Training vessel
- Displacement: 70 tonnes (69 long tons)
- Length: 75 ft 3 in (22.94 m)
- Installed power: Yanmar diesel generator
- Propulsion: 2 × Detroit Diesel 6-71 series engines, 320 hp (239 kW)
- Speed: 10 knots
- Boats & landing craft carried: Zodiac launch
- Complement: 12 - 14
- Sensors & processing systems: Furuno 1831

YAG 300 (Yard Auxiliary, General Formerly designated Yard Ferry, Personnel) vessels were a series of ten wooden boats built between 1954 and 1955 that throughout their service acted as yard ferries (Blue Boats), training platforms and test beds for route survey equipment with the Royal Canadian Navy (RCN).

Unofficially known as Canadian Forces Auxiliary Vessels (CFAV), the 75-foot boats primarily served as at-sea training platforms for junior naval officers, boatswains, reserve personnel and Sea Cadets at Canadian Forces Base (CFB) Esquimalt until they were taken out of service in 2007. According to the Department of National Defence, "in 2000, a total of 1830 personnel were deployed on the YAGs for a total of 585 days and steamed over 25,000 nautical miles (46,000 km) in support of training."

== Design and layout ==
The boats were 75′ long overall, 18′6″ wide, had a draft of 4′6″, measured 70 tonnes, and were all powered by twin 6-71 Detroit Diesel engines. The boats were arranged in typical naval fashion with officers housed forward with the galley and their own head, an engine room amidships, and cadet room aft with 12-14 bunks in double tiers. The heads are equipped with a pump-action lever, that could be used to pump sewage into the black water tanks held aboard or into the ocean water. Above decks was the wheelhouse mounted on the forward cabin's coaming; abaft that, the exposed breezeway; and, mounted on the after cabin's coaming, a Zodiac launch as well as a food locker and barbecue. Above the wheelhouse was an open bridge, fitted with a chart table and a gyrocompass repeater. A second gyro repeater was fitted on the quarterdeck. Each YAG was equipped with a Furuno 1831 navigation radar, with the display located in the wheelhouse.

== Retirement ==
Before being put on the auction block, the 57-year old vessels were stripped of all military equipment and then environmentally assessed for sale. Six YAGs and one yard diving tender were auctioned off to buyers on Vancouver Island and in Vancouver. Selling prices varied for each vessel depending on the intensity of the bidding.

The Canadian Government sold all six vessels for $26,537.80 CAD, with an average sale price of $4,422.96 CAD. The most expensive ship sold (YAG 320 Lynx) sold for more than $11,000. The YAG 300 series were replaced by the Orca-class tenders.

== List of YAG vessels (1954-2007) ==
	List of YAG vessels (1954-2007)					
	Name	Pennant Number	Builder	Launched	Out of Service	Dispositions
CFAV Grizzly (YAG 306)	Grizzly	306	Withey's Shipyard, Gabriola Island, BC	1954	2008	YFM 306 YFP 306 YAG 306 Sold 8 June 2011 for C$3,675.00 Name reused for Orca-class PCT 60
CFAV Cougar (YAG 308)	Cougar	308	Withey's Shipyard, Gabriola Island, BC	1954	2008	YFM 308 YFP 308 YAG 308 Sold 2 June 2011 for C$4,000.00 Name reused for Orca-class PCT 59
CFAV YTP 4 (YTP 4)	YTP 4	310	Star Shipyard (Mercer's) Ltd., New Westminster, BC	1954	1991	YFM 310 YFP 310 YMR 4 YTP 4 Retired from RCN 1991
CFAV Otter (YAG 312)	Otter	312	Star Shipyard (Mercer's) Ltd., New Westminster, BC	1954	2007	YFM 312 YFP 312 YAG 312 Sold 15 June 2011 for C$1,651.00
CFAV Caribou (YAG 314)	Caribou	314	Withey's Shipyard, Gabriola Island, BC	1954	2007	YFP 314 M.975 Nimpkish II (RCAF) YAG 314 Sold for C$1,153.00 Name reused for Orca-class PCT 57
CFAV Blue Boat 316 (YFB 316)	Blue Boat 316	316	Star Shipyard (Mercer's) Ltd., New Westminster, BC	1955	2013	YFM 316, YFP 316 YFB 316 Retired from RCN 2013 Sold 2014 (ON 838674)
CFAV Vixen (YFB 317)	Vixen	317	Withey's Shipyard, Gabriola Island, BC	1955	2011	YFM 317 YFP 317 YFB 317 Sold 2011 as Fellowship (US ON 1091262)
CFAV Blue Boat 318 (YFB 318)	Blue Boat 318	318	Star Shipyard (Mercer's) Ltd., New Westminster, BC	1955	2013	YFM 318 YFP 318 YFB 318 Retired from RCN 2013 Sold 2014.
CFAV Badger (YAG 319)	Badger	319	Withey's Shipyard, Gabriola Island, BC	1955	2008	YFM 319 YFP 319 YAG 319 Sold 2011 for C$4,680.00.
CFAV Lynx (YAG 320)	Lynx	320	Withey's Shipyard, Gabriola Island, BC	1955	2007	YFM 320 YFP 320 YAG 320 Retired from RCN 2007 Sold 2011 for C$11,378.00. Sank off the coast of Sooke BC 18 November 2021 in a storm and impounded/destroyed by Coast Guard

== Gallery ==
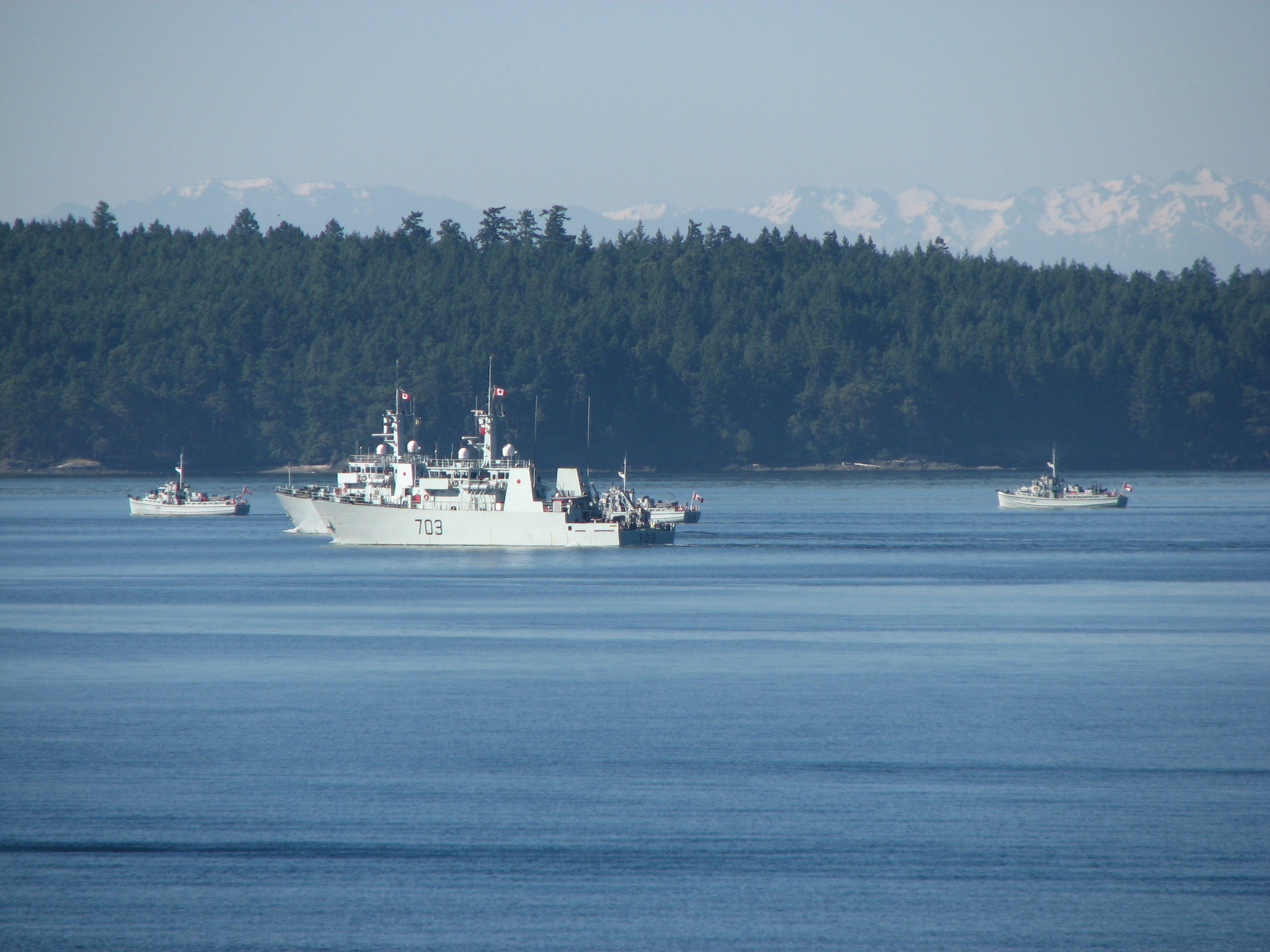
HMCS Edmonton with YAG boats (2006)

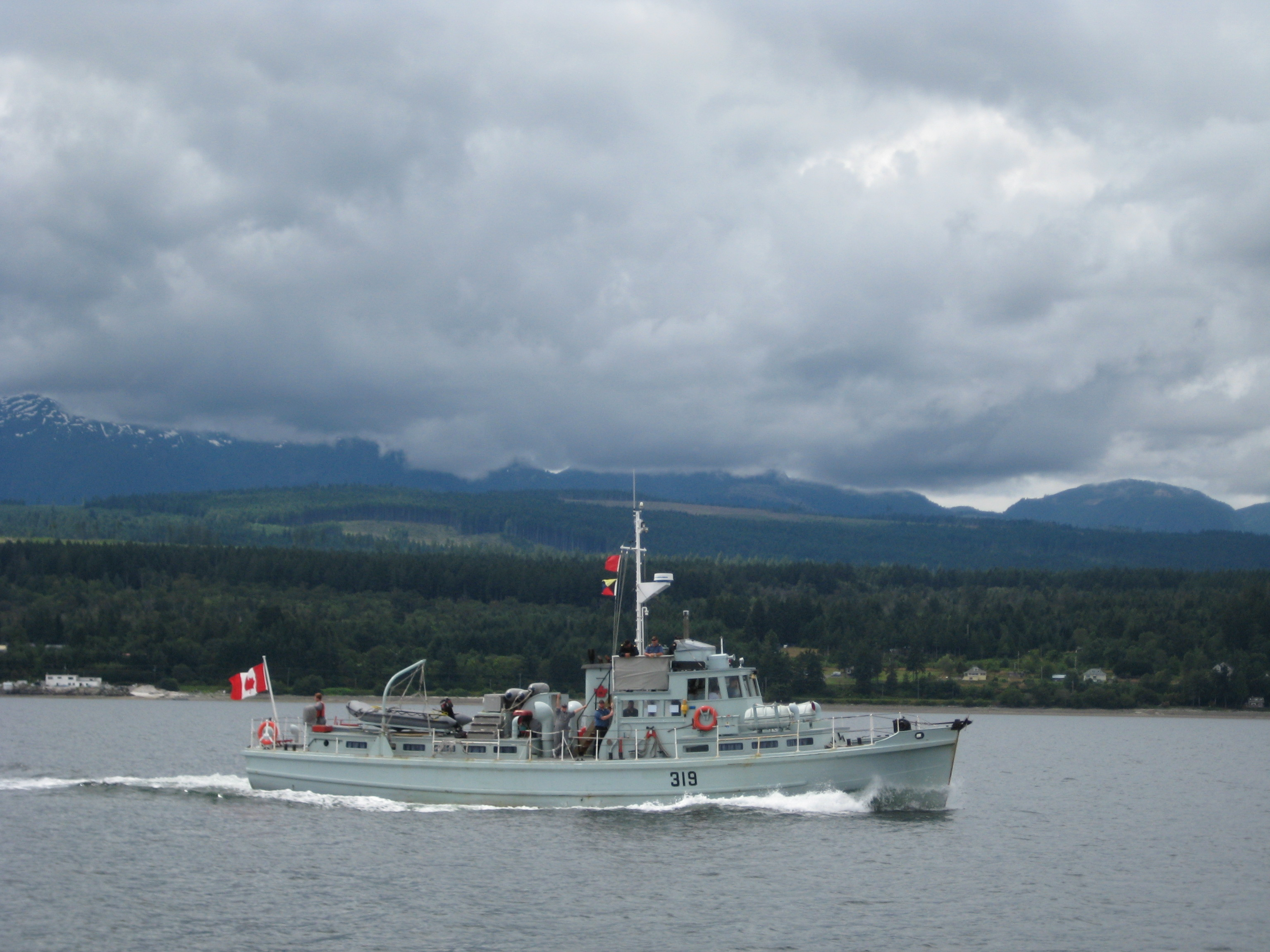
CFAV "Badger" (YAG 319)

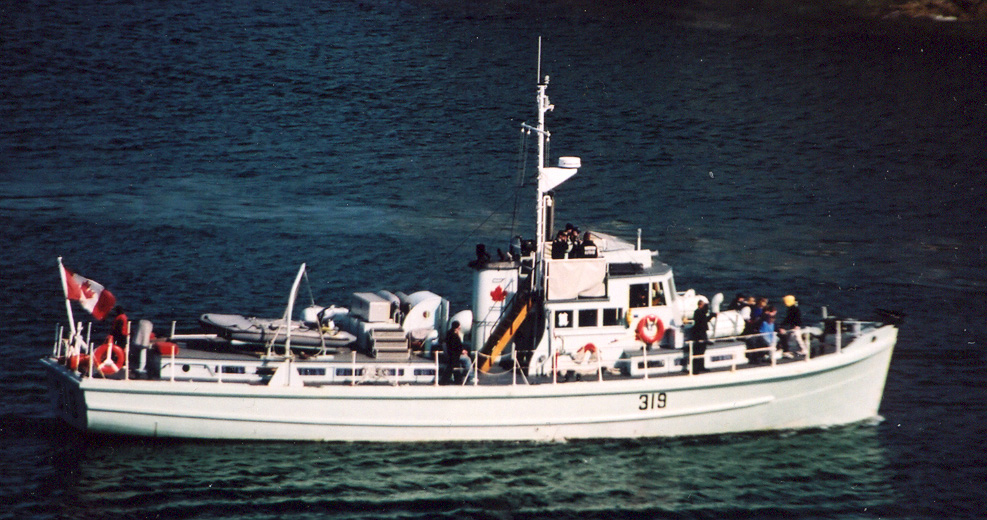
CFAV "Badger" (YAG 319)

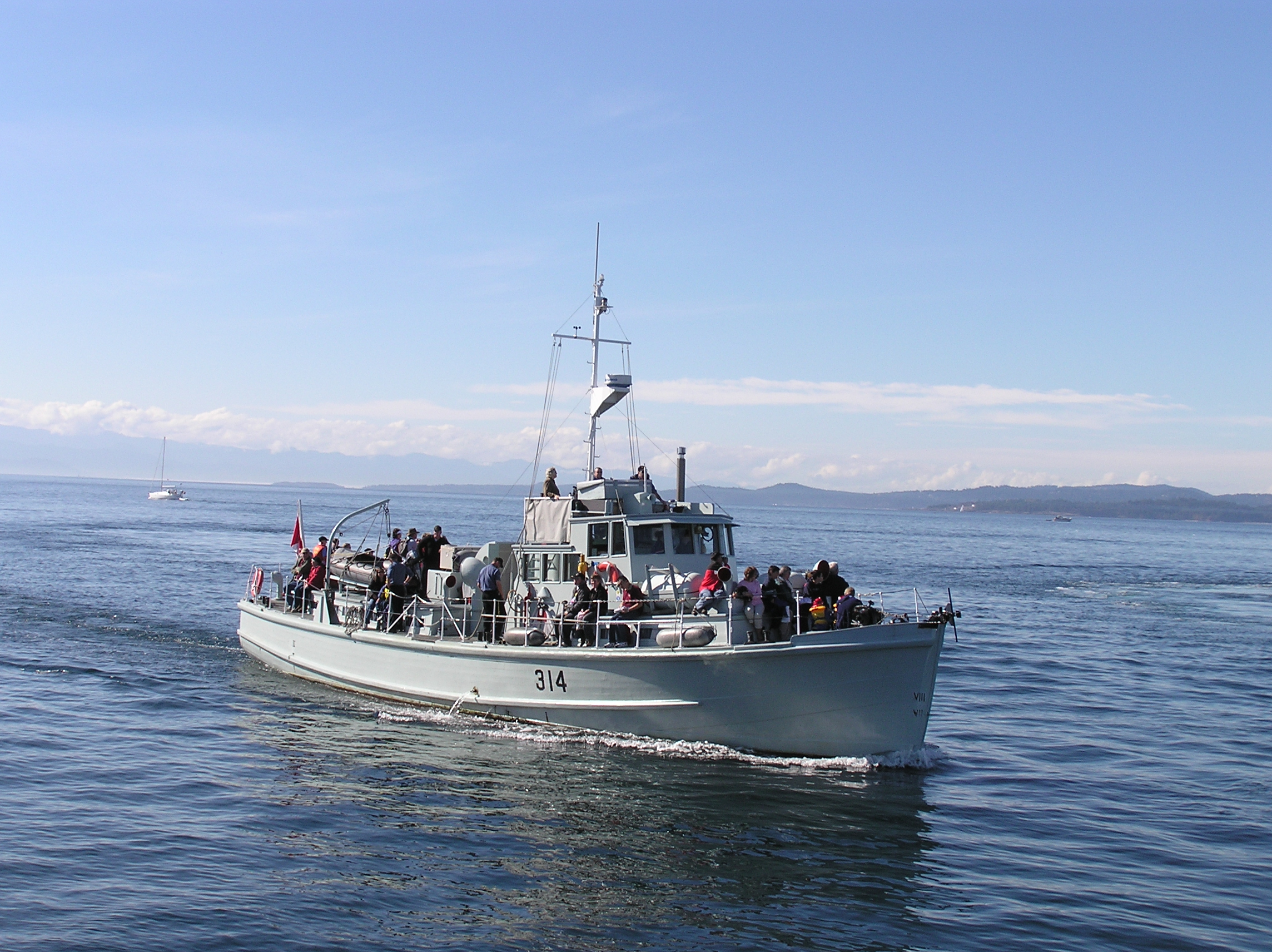
CFAV "Caribou" (YAG 314)
