= HMCS Grizzly =

Canadian WWII coastal patrol boat

History
- Name: Machigonne
- Port of registry: United States
- Builder: Consolidated Shipbuilding Corporation, New York City, New York
- In service: 1909
- Out of service: 1940
- Fate: Sold to United States Navy 1917–1919; Sold to Royal Canadian Navy 1940

United States
- Name: Machigonne
- Commissioned: 15 May 1917
- Fate: Sold for commercial service 1919

Canada
- Name: Grizzly
- Acquired: 1940
- Commissioned: 17 July 1941
- Decommissioned: 17 June 1944
- Fate: Scrapped 1945

General characteristics as Canadian armed yacht
- Type: Armed yacht
- Displacement: 195 long tons (198 t)
- Length: 140 ft (42.7 m)
- Beam: 19 ft (5.8 m)
- Draught: 10 ft (3.0 m)
- Speed: 12 knots (22 km/h; 14 mph)
- Complement: 40
- Armament: 1 × 6-pounder gun; 2 × Lewis machine guns

HMCS Grizzly was an armed yacht acquired by the Royal Canadian Navy during World War II for coastal patrol and anti-submarine defence. Constructed in 1909 as Machigonne, a yacht for William L. Douglas, the vessel was purchased by the United States Navy in 1917 for use as a patrol ship on the United States East Coast during World War I and named USS Machigonne (SP-507). Following the end of the war, Machigonne was demobilised and returned to service as a yacht.

At the onset of World War II, the Royal Canadian Navy sought capable vessels for port defence, and finding few in Canadian hands, went south to American ports and purchased suitable ships there. Machigonne was discovered and acquired. However, a lack of familiarity with Machigonne's propulsion system led to it being burnt out before entering service. Though commissioned as HMCS Grizzly, the armed yacht was not given the modifications that other Canadian armed yachts were and spent the majority of the war anchored in the passages into the harbour at Prince Rupert, British Columbia as a guard ship. By June 1944, Grizzly was no longer considered safe and was sold for scrap to the Capital Iron and Metal Company of Victoria, British Columbia in December.

== Description ==
As a yacht, Machigonne was measured at 195 gross register tons (GRT), 140 feet (43 m) long overall, with a beam of 19 feet (5.8 m) and a draught of 8 feet (2.4 m). The ship was propelled by a propeller powered by vertical triple expansion steam engine, giving the vessel a maximum speed of 14 knots (26 km/h; 16 mph). In American naval service, Machigonne was armed with three 3-pounder guns and had a complement of 31 personnel. As a Canadian armed yacht, Grizzly had a displacement of 195 long tons (198 t) and was 140 feet (43 m) long with a beam of 19 feet (5.8 m) and a draught of 10 feet (3.0 m). The vessel was equipped with diesel engines and had a maximum speed of 12 knots (22 km/h; 14 mph). The ship was initially armed with one 6-pounder gun and had a complement of 5 officers and 35 ratings.

== Service history ==
=== As Machigonne ===
Machigonne was a steel sailing yacht constructed in 1909 by the Consolidated Shipbuilding Corporation of New York City, New York. The yacht had been ordered for William L. Douglas, a shoe manufacture who later became mayor of Boston and governor of Massachusetts. During World War I, the vessel was taken up by the United States Navy for $55,000 and given the identification number SP-507 on 15 May 1917. The ship was armed with three 3-pounder guns, two machine guns and one Y-gun depth charge projector. USS Machigonne was commissioned on 9 July 1917 and employed on patrol duties along the United States East Coast. Machigonne was taken out of United States Navy service and sold for commercial use on 20 June 1919. The engines were later replaced with German submarine-type Foos diesel engines.

=== As Grizzly ===
To augment the local sea defences of ports, the Royal Canadian Navy sought large, steel-hulled yachts to requisition. However, a significant lack of capable vessels were owned by Canadians. Canada turned to its southern neighbour for suitable ships, finding several that met the navy's requirements. However, US neutrality laws prevented their sale to belligerents in the war. In order to circumvent these laws, the Royal Canadian Navy requisitioned the yachts of prominent Canadian yachtsmen and then sent them to the US to purchase the yachts that had been identified by the navy without the US government knowing they were working for the navy. The money to acquire the vessels was provided by the Canadian government through bank loans.

After being acquired, Irving Keenleyside, an executive with Burrard Dry Dock Company who had been selected by the RCN to go to the US to acquire yachts, travelled to Long Beach, California to pick up Machigonne. Either shortly before or after arrival at Esquimalt, British Columbia the unfamiliarity with the engine design by Canadian personnel led to them being burnt out due to lubrication issues. Though commissioned as Grizzly, the vessel never saw service as a powered yacht. Grizzly was primarily used as an anchored harbour/channel guard ship and as an examination vessel on the West Coast. The yacht never received the armaments and asdic the other conversions did and was anchored at the passages into Prince Rupert, British Columbia.

At Prince Rupert, Grizzly was normally anchored between British Columbia and mainland in the northern channel entering the port. The vessel was equipped with two Lewis machine guns and supported by heavier coastal artillery. Every six months, the yacht was towed into Prince Rupert and underwent an overhaul. The vessel was crewed by 14–15 naval personnel with up to three officers. In mid-1942, the north passage was closed using a log boom and Grizzly was towed to the south passage and remained as guard ship there until June 1944.

Grizzly was taken to Victoria, British Columbia in early 1944 to undergo an assessment. On 17 June 1944, Grizzly was paid off as unsafe due to deteriorating plating. The ship was sold in December 1944 to Capital Iron and Metal Company and broken up for scrap at Victoria beginning on 25 March 1945. The ship's wheel was kept as a memorial in British Columbia until at least 1980.
