= Zodiac Aerospace =

French aerospace group

- Type: Public
- Traded as: Euronext Paris: ZC
- ISIN: FR0000125684
- Industry: Aerospace equipment and systems suppliers
- Founded: 1896; 130 years ago
- Founder: Maurice Mallet
- Defunct: 1 December 2018
- Fate: Acquired by Safran
- Headquarters: Plaisir, France
- Key people: Yann Delabrière (chairman/CEO); Maurice Pinault (deputy CEO); Didier Domange (chairman-supervisory board)
- Products: interior furnishings and control systems of aircraft.
- Brands: Zodiac Aerosafety, Zodiac Aircraft Systems, Zodiac Cabin & Structures, Zodiac Galleys & Equipment, Zodiac Seats, Zodiac Aerospace Services
- Revenue: €5.2 Billion (2015-2016)
- Net income: €108.1 million (2015-2016)
- Number of employees: 35,000 (2015-2016)
- Website: zodiacaerospace.com (archived in Sept 2018)

Zodiac Aerospace was a French aerospace group, active from 1896 to 2018, that supplied systems and equipment for aircraft. In October 2018, it was acquired by French aerospace and defense company Safran.

== History ==
=== Aeronautic foundations (1896–1933) ===
The company was founded in 1896 as "Mallet, Mélandri et de Pitray" by Maurice Mallet and his associates. In the beginning, the company produced hydrogen balloons for sport and tourism.

In 1909, the company changed its name to "Zodiac". It then experienced a boom fueled by the construction of airplanes and airships, especially for the Aérostation Maritime (Naval Balloon Command), and through its participation in the war effort. Until the 1930s, it produced 63 airships.

=== Marine activities (1934–1972) ===
In 1934, the company created the first prototype inflatable boats, ancestors of the renowned "Zodiac", which would contribute to the development of the civil and military inflatable boat industry. The company benefited from the boom in leisure activities after World War II, as well as the French interest in recreational boating in the 1960s. Zodiac developed inflatable boats for the civil market and gradually gave up the airship market for the more promising water sports market. Zodiac honored a contract in 1966 with CNES (Centre National d'Etudes Spatiales - National Centre for Space Studies) for the production of a meteorological balloon, in the scope of the EOLE project. At the end of the 1960s, Zodiac reorganized and set up its first sales operation for exporting its products overseas more easily. In 1964 it opened its first subsidiary in Spain - "Zodiac Española" - followed by "Zodiac North America" in 1970.

=== Group internationalization (1973–1989) ===
At the beginning of the 1970s, Zodiac experienced financial difficulties. Spurred on by its new CEO, Jean-Louis Gerondeau, and with the support of shareholders and the IDI (Institute pour le Development Industrial - French Institute for Industrial Development), the Group recovered by 1977. In 1983, Zodiac was the first company to be listed on the 'Second Market' of the Paris Stock Exchange. The firm conducted an international development policy and increases its acquisitions, thereby enabling it to position itself in niche markets on a global scale. In 1978, it acquired Aérazur Constructions Aéronautiques and thus re-entered the aerospace market. In 1979, it acquired EFA (Parachutes), which led to the creation of the aerospace segment, and continued its development in marine and aerospace with the acquisitions of Bombard-L'Angevinière (ranked second in inflatable boats), Saylor (leading French producer of light PVC inflatable structures) in 1981 and Superflexit (flexible tanks) in 1983, as well as the takeover of Parachutes de France (sport parachutes). In 1987, Zodiac acquired Air Cruisers (leader in evacuation slides), Metzeler (inflatable boats), B. Kern, and Europol in 1988, it acquired Pioneer, at the time the second American manufacturer of deceleration and engine braking recovery systems through parachutes.

=== Development of aerospace businesses (1990–2006) ===
In the 1990s, the Group continued its acquisitions, strengthening its aerospace business. In 1998, Monogram Systems (onboard water and waste management) joined, as did the Inter technique Group in 1999. The latter acquisition significantly increased the aerospace share in the Group's business and later enabled the creation of the Aircraft Systems segment, specializing in on-board systems.

From 2002 to 2006, Zodiac successively acquired ESCO (emergency arresting systems), ICORE (cable protection and interconnect systems), Avox Systems (oxygen systems), C&D Aerospace (cabin interiors), Enertec and In-Snec (telemetry and data recording).

=== Split and refocus on aerospace (2007–2018) ===
In September 2007, the Zodiac Group sold its Marine business to a holding company, 72% owned by the American Group Carlyle with 28% being retained by Zodiac, thus creating Zodiac Marine and Pool. In November 2007, Olivier Zarrouati succeeded Jean-Louis Gerondeau as Chief Executive Officer.

At the beginning of 2008, the Group was renamed Zodiac Aerospace and adopted a new logo. At the end of 2008, Zodiac Aerospace strengthened its position in the cabin interiors segment by acquiring the Dutch company Driessen (leading manufacturer of galleys for single-aisle aircraft and trolleys), Adder (cabin separators) and TIA (electrical equipment for galleys, mainly for the business aircraft market). Zodiac Aerospace continued its acquisition strategy in cabin interiors as well as in systems. In 2010, the Canadian company Cantwell Cullen & Co (cabling and interconnect systems) and the German company Sell GmbH (galleys for wide-bodied aircraft) joined the Group.

The year 2010 was marked by a takeover bid for Zodiac Aerospace by the French Group Safran. At the beginning of July 2010, Zodiac Aerospace announced that it had been officially approached by Safran and that, having examined Safran's proposal, its Supervisory Board had unanimously decided not to pursue it. For several months, Zodiac and Safran squared up in the media. In November 2010, the AMF (French Financial Markets Authority) summoned Safran to clarify its position: its CEO, Jean-Paul Herteman announced in November 2010 that he had given up his plan to acquire Zodiac Aerospace. Since 2011, Zodiac Aerospace has continued its acquisitions:

- Heath Tecna (cabin interiors for commercial aircraft);
- Contour Aerospace (first class and business class seats);
- IMS (IFE - In-Flight Entertainment - systems);
- NAT (engineering and certification);
- TriaGnoSys (on-board connectivity systems for In-flight entertainment);
- PPP (oxygen systems);
- Greenpoint Technologies (VIP/VVIP configuration layout design for wide-bodied aircraft);
- Enviro Systems (environment control system).

In September 2012, Zodiac Aerospace put in place an organization comprising five segments (Zodiac Aero safety, Zodiac Aircraft Systems, Zodiac Cabin & Structures, Zodiac Galleys & Equipment and Zodiac Seats), complemented by an after-sales service business, Zodiac Aerospace Services.

=== Explosion ===
On Tuesday, 14 July 2015, an explosion occurred in a prepreg treater at Zodiac Aerospace's Engineered Materials Plant in Newport, Washington, United States. Five individuals were injured as a result of the blast, and people were asked to remain at least 600 meters from the building.

=== Acquisition by Safran ===
On 19 January 2017, Safran announced a deal to buy Zodiac at €29.47 per share in cash, with a deal total of almost €10 billion ($10.5 billion). In May 2017, Safran reduced the amount offered to take Zodiac by $1 billion after Zodiac posted an unfavorable earnings forecast. On 19 October 2018, Safran and Zodiac Aerospace signed an agreement for the latter to merge into Safran.

== Zodiac Aerospace brand ==
When it was founded in 1896, the company was called "Mallet, Mélandri et de Pitray". It changed its name several times during the course of its history. In 1899, it became "Ateliers de constructions aéronautiques Maurice Mallet" (Maurice Mallet aerospace construction workshops), and nine years later it became "Société Française des ballons dirigeables" ("French company of balloons and dirigibles"). In 1909, the name Zodiac (with an English spelling) appeared in the name "Société Française de ballons dirigeables et d'aviation Zodiac" ("French company of balloons, dirigibles, and aviation, Zodiac"), followed in 1911 by "Société Zodiac, anciens Établissements aéronautiques Maurice Mallet" ("Zodiac Company, formerly Maurice Mallet aeronautical establishments"). In 1965, the company changed its name to "Zodiac" (english spelling). The name Zodiac is associated with the inflatable boats that were developed after the Second World War and made famous by the explorations of Jacques Cousteau and the experiences of intentional castaway Alain Bombard. For this reason, when the Zodiac Group sold its Marine business in 2007, the Zodiac brand was also sold. In accordance with the agreements signed with the acquiring company, the Group took the name of "Zodiac Aerospace", which emphasized its refocus on aerospace. This name change was accompanied by the creation of a new logo.

== Organization ==
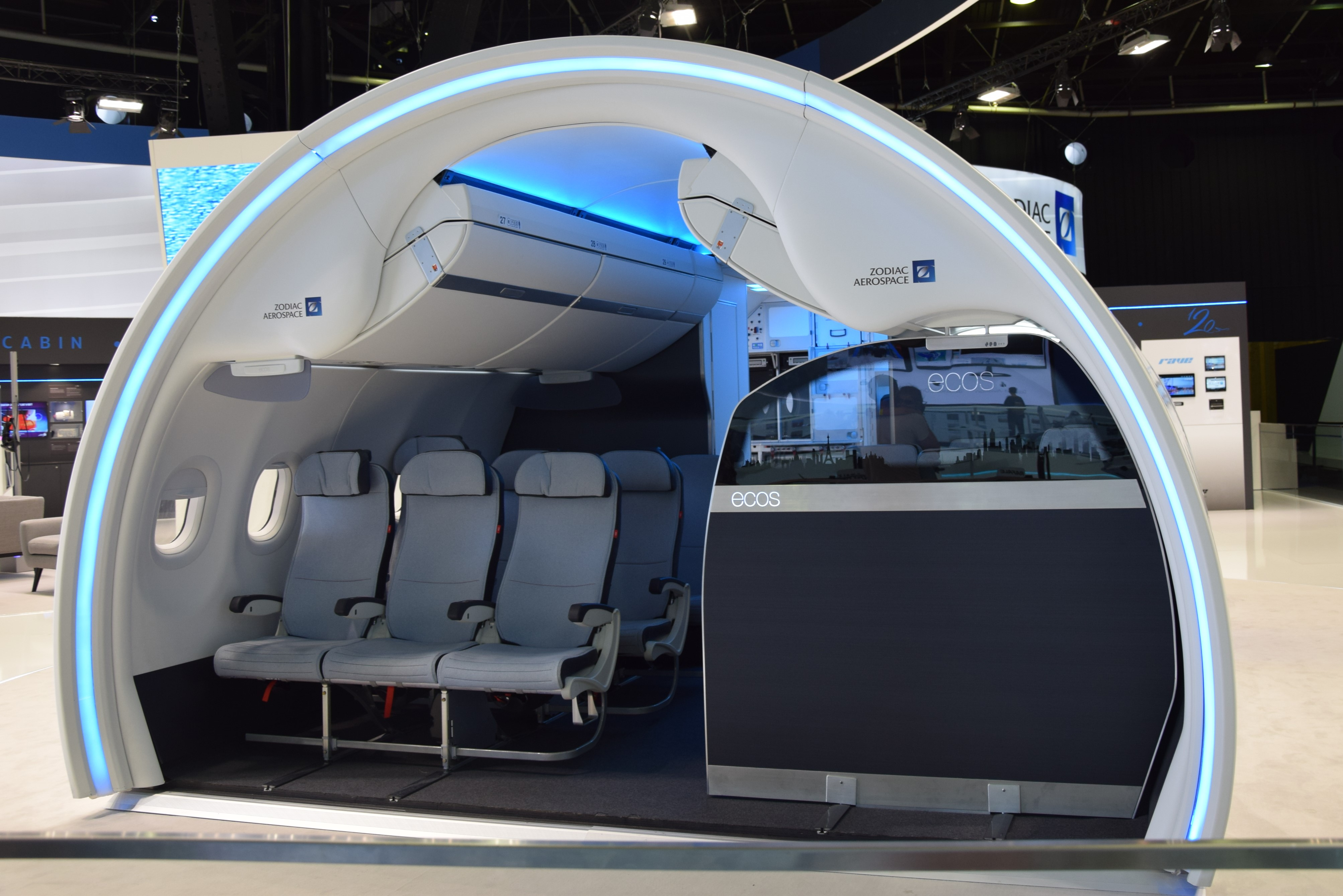
Zodiac Aerospace at Paris Air Show 2017

Zodiac Aerospace provides equipment for commercial aircraft, regional aircraft, and business aircraft as well as helicopters and spacecraft. The Group consists of 5 operational segments, supported by a service activity.

=== Zodiac Aerosafety ===
Zodiac Aerosafety brings together businesses that develop on-board and ground safety systems as well as protection and rescue solutions. This segment comprises 5 divisions, mainly located in Europe and the United States.

- Zodiac Arresting Systems develops emergency arresting systems including the EMASMAX product, which helps to secure civil airport runways.
- Zodiac Evacuation Systems offers rescue systems such as inflatable lifejackets, evacuation slides and emergency flotation systems for helicopters.
- Zodiac Interconnect specializes in cable protection and interconnect systems.
- Zodiac Elastomer designs flexible tanks for aircraft and fuel distribution systems.
- Zodiac Parachute & Protection offers civil and military parachutes.

Zodiac Arresting Systems (EMASMAX®)

=== Zodiac Aircraft Systems ===
The Zodiac Aircraft Systems segment specializes in onboard systems that provide essential in-flight functions. This segment comprises 7 divisions and is mainly located in Europe (France and Germany) and in the United States.

- Zodiac Cabin & Cockpit Systems supplies systems for cockpits, internal and external lighting systems and pilot and passenger oxygen systems (LAVOX, Eros, etc.).
- Zodiac Controls develops measurement sensors and system management solutions.
- Zodiac Electrical Systems specializes in electrical power management systems.
- Zodiac Entertainment & Seat Technologies comprises two parts. Zodiac In-flight Innovations develops and sells onboard entertainment systems (RAVE) and connectivity. Zodiac Actuation Systems produces electric actuators for aircraft seats.
- Zodiac Fluid Management offers solutions for managing fluid circulation (fuel, water, etc.).
- Zodiac Water & Waste supplies onboard systems for treating wastewater and garbage.
- Zodiac Data Systems designs telemetry applications and onboard systems for data acquisition and recording. Its products are known under the following brand names: In-Snec, Enertec and HEIM.

=== Zodiac Galleys and Equipment ===
The Zodiac Galleys & Equipment segment comprises three divisions, located in Europe (France, Germany and the Netherlands), the United States and Thailand.

- Zodiac Galleys fits out single aisle and twin-aisle kitchen areas of aircraft and rest areas for flight crew.
- Zodiac Galley Inserts supplies kitchen equipment (ovens, coffee machines, waste compactors, chillers, microwave ovens, etc.).
- Zodiac Rotable Equipment supplies trolleys (for carrying food and duty-free items on board the aircraft) and containers for loading baggage and goods into aircraft holds (LD3).

=== Zodiac Cabin & Structures ===
The Zodiac Cabin & Structures segment designs and manufactures cabin interiors for fitting out new aircraft and refitting old aircraft. It is mainly located in the United States.

- Zodiac OEM Cabin Interiors designs, develops and certifies the cabin interiors of commercial and regional aircraft.
- Zodiac Airline Cabin Interiors offers airlines a service for refitting cabin interiors.
- Zodiac Northwest Aerospace Technologies is an engineering company specializing in cabin refit programs and their certification.
- Zodiac Advanced Composites and Engineered Materials supplies composite materials for fitting out cabin interiors.
- Zodiac Business Aircraft Cabin Interiors designs and manufactures cabin interiors for business aircraft.

=== Zodiac Seats ===
Zodiac Seats designs, manufactures and sells passenger seats (first class, business class, premium economy, and standard economy class) for commercial and regional aircraft as well as technical seats (for aircraft pilots, seats for helicopters, and seats for flight crew). This segment comprises 4 main divisions:

- Zodiac Seats France (formerly Sicma Aerospace) is based in Issoudun, France and specializes in business class and economy class seats.
- Zodiac Seats U.S. (formerly Weber Aircraft, LLC.) is located in Gainesville, Texas and specializes mainly in economy class seats. Its subsidiary, Zodiac Seats California, specializes in seats for regional aircraft.
- Zodiac Seats UK (formerly Contour Aerospace) is based in Cwmbran and Camberley (United Kingdom). It specializes in first class and business class seats.
- Zodiac Seats Shells, based in Santa Maria, California, manufactures seat shells in composite materials for business class seats.

=== Zodiac Aerospace Services ===
Zodiac Aerospace Services is the after-sales service activity of Zodiac Aerospace Group. It has locations in Europe, the United States, the Middle East and Asia.

== Governance and management ==
Zodiac Aerospace Group is a Limited Company with an Executive Board and a Supervisory Board. It is managed by the Executive Board, chaired by Olivier Zarrouati and by the Executive Committee. The Supervisory Board is chaired by Didier Domange.

== Markets and strategy ==
The products and systems developed by Zodiac Aerospace mainly address the civil aerospace market. They break down into two categories:

- SFE (Supplier-Furnished Equipment) products: Equipment supplied by the aircraft manufacturer, which is selected by aircraft manufacturers at the beginning of a program and is then fitted into all aircraft produced.
- BFE (Buyer-Furnished Equipment) products: Equipment supplied by the aircraft buyer, which is selected by airlines to fit out their new aircraft or as a replacement for equipment on older aircraft.

This development is based both on organic growth as well as growth by acquisition.

== Innovation ==
Zodiac Aerospace takes part in research and innovation programs that bring together various industry players.

- CORAC Génome
- Hycarus - Fuel cells
- (Airbus) eFan project

Zodiac Aerospace also supports innovation through the Jean-Louis Gerondeau Award, created four years ago to reward undergraduates or PhD students of the Ecole Polytechnique, championing a business creation project and encouraging entrepreneurial spirit and innovation.

== Key figures ==
Zodiac Aerospace's fiscal year starts on 1 September and ends on 31 August.

=== Share ownership and stock market information ===
Zodiac Aerospace's shares are listed on the Euronext Paris market. As at 29 March 2016, Zodiac Aerospace's share capital stood at €4,515 million euros made up of 289,407,962 shares.

=== Fiscal year 2013 / 2014 ===
- Revenue: €4.175m
- Current operating income (before IFRS 3): €549.9m
- Net Income: €354.4m
- Dividend (in €): 0.32
- Net Debt/Equity ratio 0.43

== Philanthropy ==
For many years, Zodiac Aerospace has been supporting the Petits Princes association at Group level. The Group also provides support for projects that encourage scientific research, as with "Wings for Science" in 2012 for example. Subsidiaries also support local initiatives, mainly in the fields of health and education.

=== Wings for Science ===
Since 2012, the Group has been supporting the ORA (Observer Relever Analyser - Observe Record Analyze) association through the supply of equipment. The objective of this project is to make a light aircraft available to research laboratories to support scientific work and to inspire young people. In June 2013, the aircraft was displayed at Le Bourget during the Paris Air Show.

=== Local initiatives ===
Around the world, Zodiac Aerospace's subsidiaries support local initiatives on education and health. For example, two Group entities (Zodiac Galley Inserts and Zodiac Oxygen Systems) gifted equipment to the ORBIS association in 2013; this was used to equip a hospital in an aircraft travelling in troubled countries to care for people with eye problems and to take the latest medical innovations to local doctors.
