= Orca-class patrol vessel =

Canadian naval training vessels

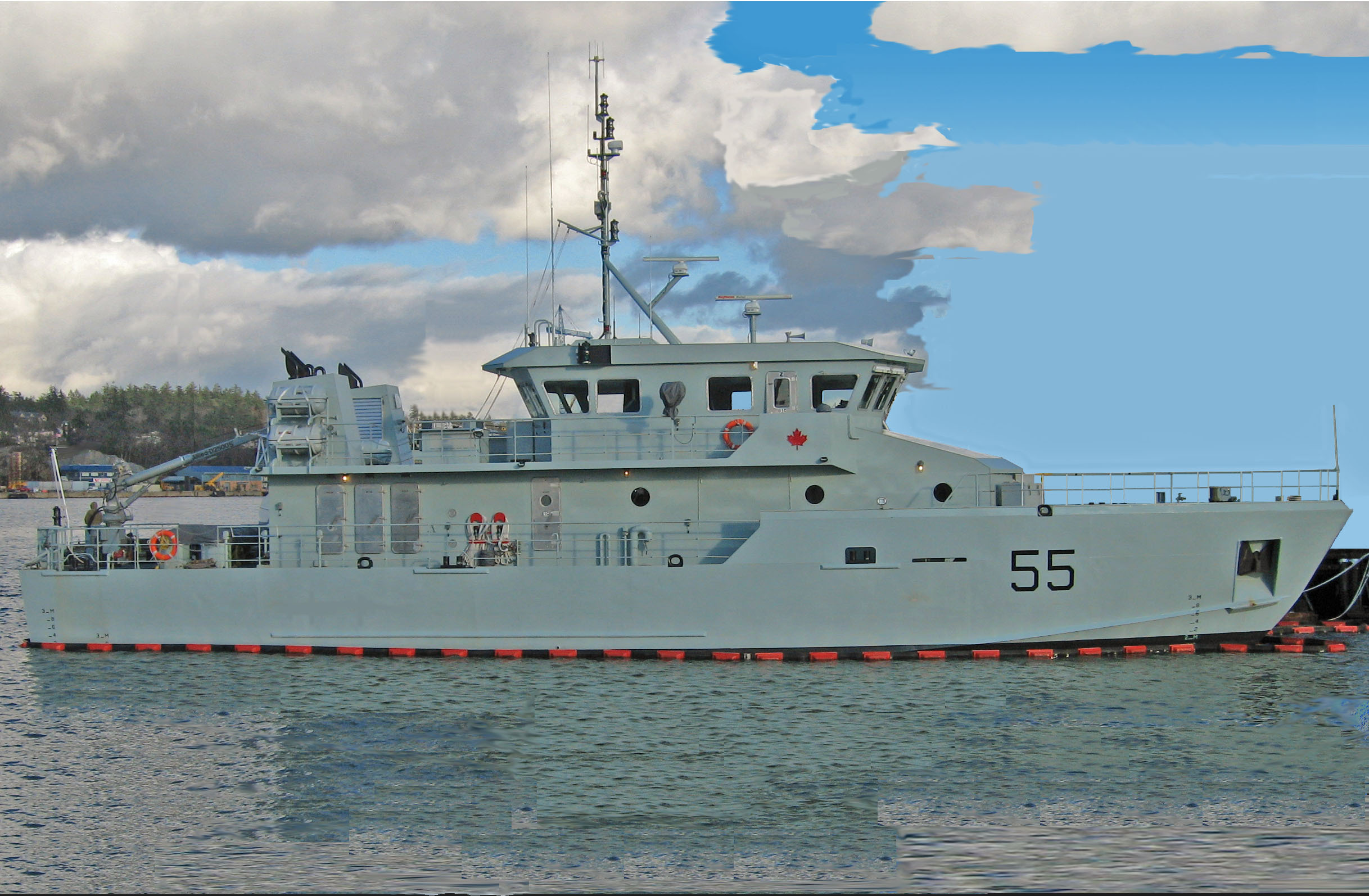
- Orca of the Royal Canadian Navy, January 2007

Class overview
- Name: Orca class
- Builders: Victoria Shipyards, Esquimalt
- Operators: Royal Canadian Navy
- Preceded by: YAG 300
- Cost: CA$90.7 million (2004) (equivalent to CA$142.2 million in 2025) for 8 vessels; CA$11.3 million (2004) (equivalent to CA$17.7 million in 2025) per unit
- Built: November 2004 – October 2008
- In service: 17 November 2006 – present
- Completed: 8
- Active: 8

General characteristics
- Type: Training tender and patrol boat
- Displacement: 210 t (210 long tons)
- Length: 33 m (108 ft 3 in)
- Beam: 8.34 m (27 ft 4 in)
- Draught: 2.6 m (8 ft 6 in)
- Propulsion: 2 x Caterpillar 3516B diesel engines, 2,500 hp (1,900 kW) each at 1,600 rpm; 2 x ZF 7550A gearboxes; 2 x 1,400 mm (55 in) fixed pitch propellers
- Speed: 20 knots (37 km/h; 23 mph) governed
- Range: 660 nmi (1,220 km; 760 mi) at 15 knots (28 km/h; 17 mph)
- Complement: 5 (minimum); 24 (maximum)
- Armament: 2 x C6 7.62 mm machine guns, and embarked small arms. Foredeck is strengthened to accept a 12.7 mm M2 machine gun (FFBNW).
- Notes: 1 × Zodiac SR2 rescue boat; 1 × Allied Systems D2500S deck crane

The Orca-class patrol vessels are a class of eight steel-hulled training and surveillance vessels in service with the Royal Canadian Navy (RCN) at Patrol Craft Training Unit (PCTU) Canadian Forces Base (CFB) Esquimalt. Based on the Australian Pacific-class patrol boat design, all of the Orca vessels were constructed by Victoria Shipyards between November 2004 and November 2008. In addition to carrying the RCN designation of patrol craft training (PCT), the Orca class are not formally commissioned in the RCN and as such do not possess the His Majesty's Canadian Ship (HMCS) prefix.

== Design and description ==
In the early 2000s, the Canadian Forces Maritime Command (MARCOM) began searching for a replacement for its aging 1950s-era wooden-hulled YAG 300 training tenders. While training aboard the YAG vessels was considered useful, initial training of naval officers was moving towards more modern land-based simulators that more accurately replicated the conditions aboard RCN capital ships. On 8 November 2004 the Department of National Defence (DND) announced a $69.7 million contract for six new ships, with an option for two more for a total budget of $90.7 million.

Based on the Australian Tenix Defence–designed Pacific-class Seahorse Mercator, the Canadian-built Orca class shares the same hull design as the Australian vessel, but is 15 percent larger. Stretched to the maximum allowed by the contract, the Canadian Orca class was designed to allow for the hull to withstand any increase in the size and weight of future equipment. With the change in size, also came a change to the propulsion system, crew accommodations and bridge structure.

Designed to accommodate a 12.7 mm M2 machine gun, the foredeck was strengthened and extra fire protection was added, requiring a new firemain supply to the new ammunition storage lockers. This redesign led to several systems, including the auxiliary seawater and bilge systems to be upgraded. In addition, requirements under the Canada Shipping Act and Canadian naval requirements also necessitated the installation of a third generator, changing the electrical supply to 120 volts/60 hertz and a redesigned water cooling system. Beginning in 2026, the ships of the class regularly mount two C6 7.62 mm machine guns in support of their patrol and training roles.

Designed as a "'stepping stone' to larger fleet warships", the Orcas were also designed with a larger wheelhouse fitted with warship-grade navigational equipment. The large bridge offers expansive views all around, ensuring safety and enhancing training value. Below the bridge is a sixteen-seat training room with reconfigurable seating, desks and a multimedia centre, which also serves as a mess and medical area. As the training room sits atop the machinery space, a multi-component acoustic system and absorbent material was used for sound deadening.

The Orca class were the first vessels of its size to be built to the American Bureau of Shipping (ABS) High-Speed Naval Craft (HSNC) A1 classification and are constructed using CSA G40.21 50W/350WT high-strength structural steel. Known for its reliability in cold climates, it is the same type of steel used in the Canadian Halifax-class frigates.

Each Orca-class vessel shares the same dimensions of being 33 metres (108 ft 3 in) long, a beam of 8.34 metres (27 ft 4 in), a draught of 2.0 metres (6 ft 7 in), and a displacement of 210 tonnes (210 long tons). Powered by two Caterpillar 3516B marine diesel engines, each rated for 1,900 kilowatts (2,500 hp) at 1,600 revolutions per minute, they are capable of 20 knots (37 km/h; 23 mph), and have an endurance of 660 nautical miles (1,220 km; 760 mi) at 15 knots (28 km/h; 17 mph). Able to be operated by a core crew of five, the maximum bunk space on the Orcas is twenty-four with two two-bunk cabins for the crew (officer in charge, executive officer, senior bosun's mate, Orca-class engineer) two six-bunk cabins and two four-bunk cabins for instructors and trainees. Each Orca carries one Zodiac SR2 inflatable rescue boat that holds two sailors.

== Construction ==
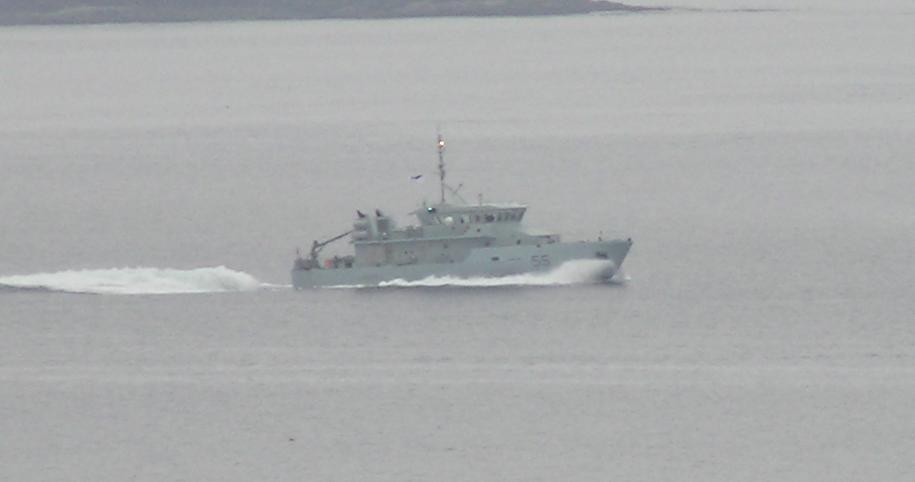
Orca undergoing its sea trials in Esquimalt Harbour, October 2006

During the early stages of the Second World War, the Canadian Government acquired fourteen large yachts from the United States and all were given animal names upon commissioning in the RCN. All but Orca and Raven perpetuate the names of those armed yachts and all have a connection to First Nations lore. Cougar, Moose, and Wolf are the third vessels to carry those names as they also perpetuate the names of Canadian Fairmile B motor launches used by the Canadian Forces Naval Reserve as training ships after the Second World War.

All eight Orca-class vessels were constructed by Victoria Shipyards at Victoria, British Columbia with the first in class Orca, was laid down in September 2005, launched in August 2006, and delivered to MARCOM in November 2006. The remaining Orcas delivered were: Raven in March 2007; Caribou in July 2007; Renard in September 2007; Wolf in November 2007; Grizzly in March 2008; Cougar in July 2008 and Moose in November 2008.

Construction data
Name	Pennant number	Builder	Launched	Service entry	Last refit	Next refit	Homeport	Status
Orca	PCT 55	Seaspan ULC, Esquimalt, British Columbia	8 August 2006	9 November 2006	2015	2020	CFB Esquimalt	Active
Raven	PCT 56	Seaspan ULC, Esquimalt, British Columbia	10 January 2007	15 March 2007	2015	2020	CFB Esquimalt	Active
Caribou	PCT 57	Seaspan ULC, Esquimalt, British Columbia	2 May 2007	31 July 2007	2016	2021	CFB Esquimalt	Active
Renard	PCT 58	Seaspan ULC, Esquimalt, British Columbia	1 August 2007	13 September 2007	2016	2021	CFB Esquimalt	Active
Wolf	PCT 59	Seaspan ULC, Esquimalt, British Columbia	22 October 2007	29 November 2007	2017	2022	CFB Esquimalt	Active
Grizzly	PCT 60	Seaspan ULC, Esquimalt, British Columbia	14 February 2008	19 March 2008	2017	2022	CFB Esquimalt	Active
Cougar	PCT 61	Seaspan ULC, Esquimalt, British Columbia	28 August 2008	2 October 2008	2018	2023	CFB Esquimalt	Active
Moose	PCT 62	Seaspan ULC, Esquimalt, British Columbia	23 October 2008	27 November 2008	2018	2023	CFB Esquimalt	Active

== Employment ==
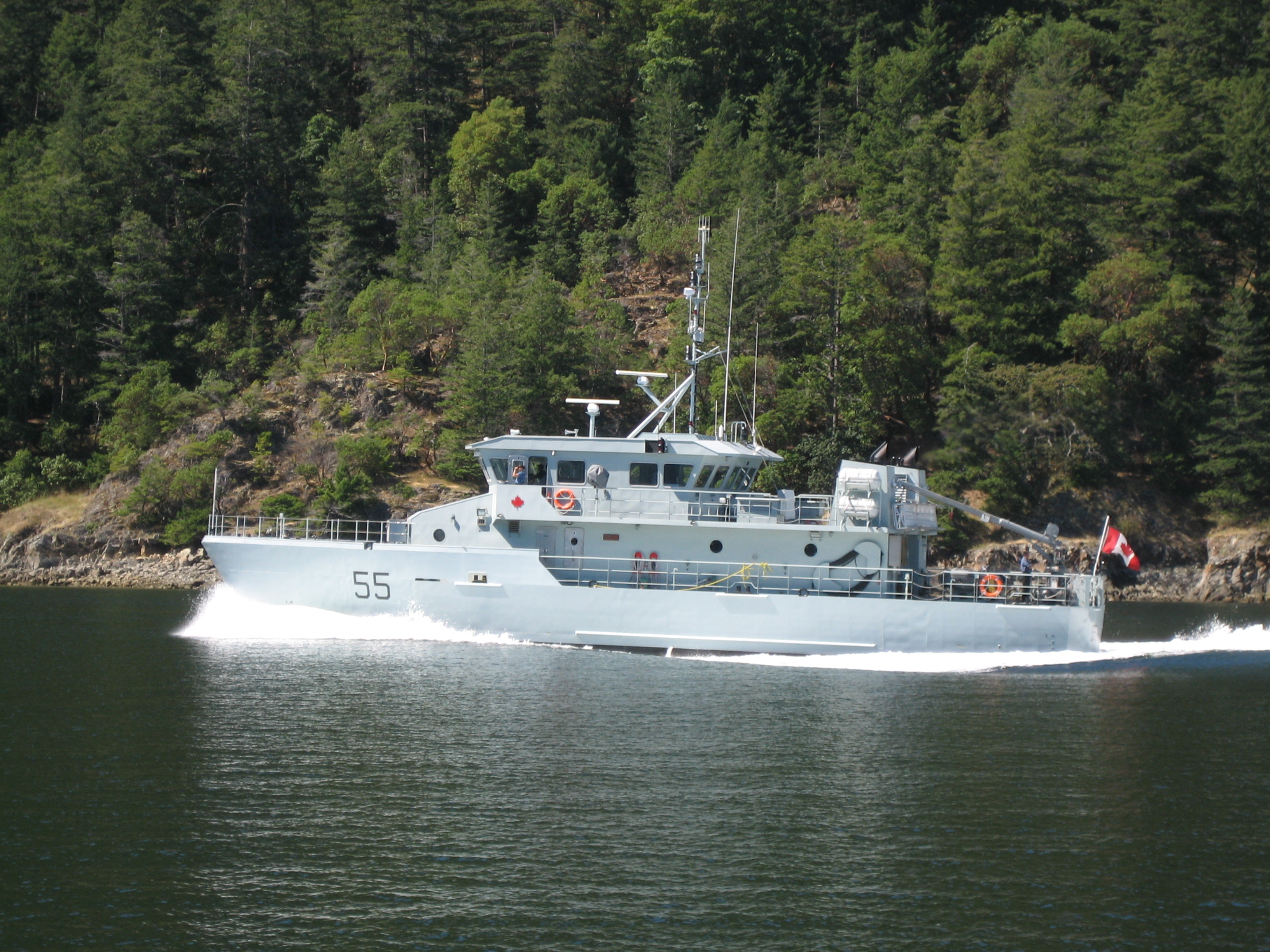
Orca sailing in the Gulf Islands in support of naval officer training, August 2007

As dedicated training tenders, the Orcas are primarily used to facilitate numerous one-to-six-week long at-sea training evolutions for training both regular and reserve force RCN naval officers. The vessels are also used to train non-commissioned members and provide an at sea experience for the teenage members of the Royal Canadian Sea Cadets. The Orcas are considered vessels of opportunity for surveillance and search and rescue and are all homeported at CFB Esquimalt.

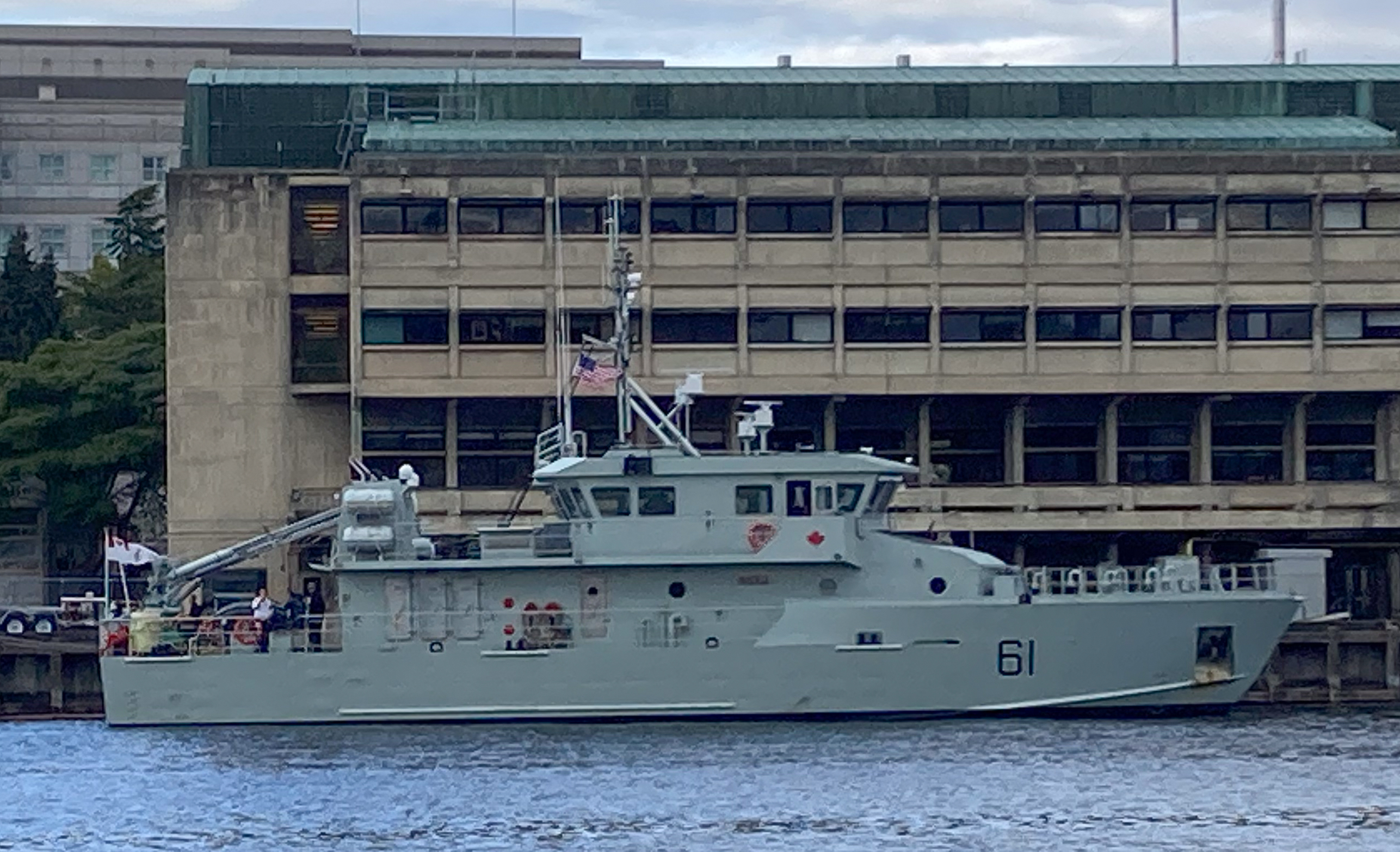
Cougar in Seattle in 2025

During Operation Podium, the Canadian Forces support of the 2010 Vancouver Winter Olympics, three Orcas were temporarily fitted with 12.7 mm machine guns for port security duties.

On 15 June 2017, while HMCS Chicoutimi was docked at CFB Esquimalt, Cougar struck the submarine as it was exiting the dockyard. The initial inspection following the collision showed only superficial damage to the protective gear around the submarine and only minor damage to Cougar's propeller.
