= Toronto Harbour =

Bay on the north shore of Lake Ontario, in Toronto, Ontario, Canada

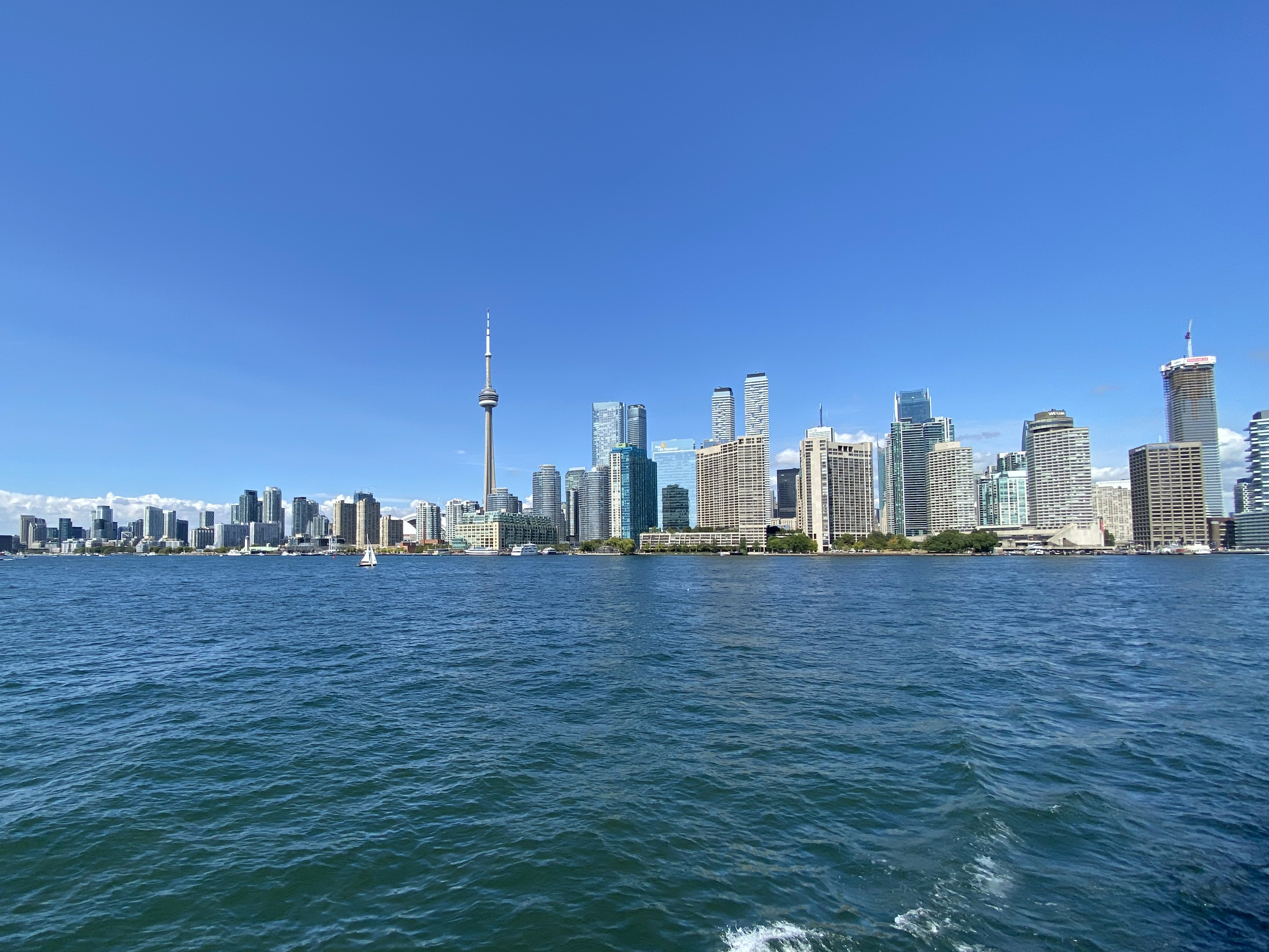
- Toronto skyline from Toronto Harbour

- Location within Ontario Location within Canada Location within North America
- Location: Toronto, Ontario, Canada
- Coordinates: 43°38′04″N 79°22′15″W
- Part of: Lake Ontario

Toronto Harbour or Toronto Bay is a natural bay on the north shore of Lake Ontario, in Toronto, Ontario, Canada. Today, the harbour is used primarily for recreational boating, including personal vessels and pleasure boats providing scenic or party cruises. Ferries travel from docks on the mainland to the Islands, and cargo ships deliver aggregates and raw sugar to industries located in the harbour. Historically, the harbour has been used for military vessels, passenger traffic and cargo traffic. Waterfront uses include residential, recreational, cultural, commercial and industrial sites.

== Description ==
There are two harbours: the original natural harbour, today named the "Inner Harbour", and the "Outer Harbour". Access into the Inner Harbour is made via either the Western Gap or Eastern Gap. The Don River drains into the Inner Harbour from the north-east, through the Keating Channel.

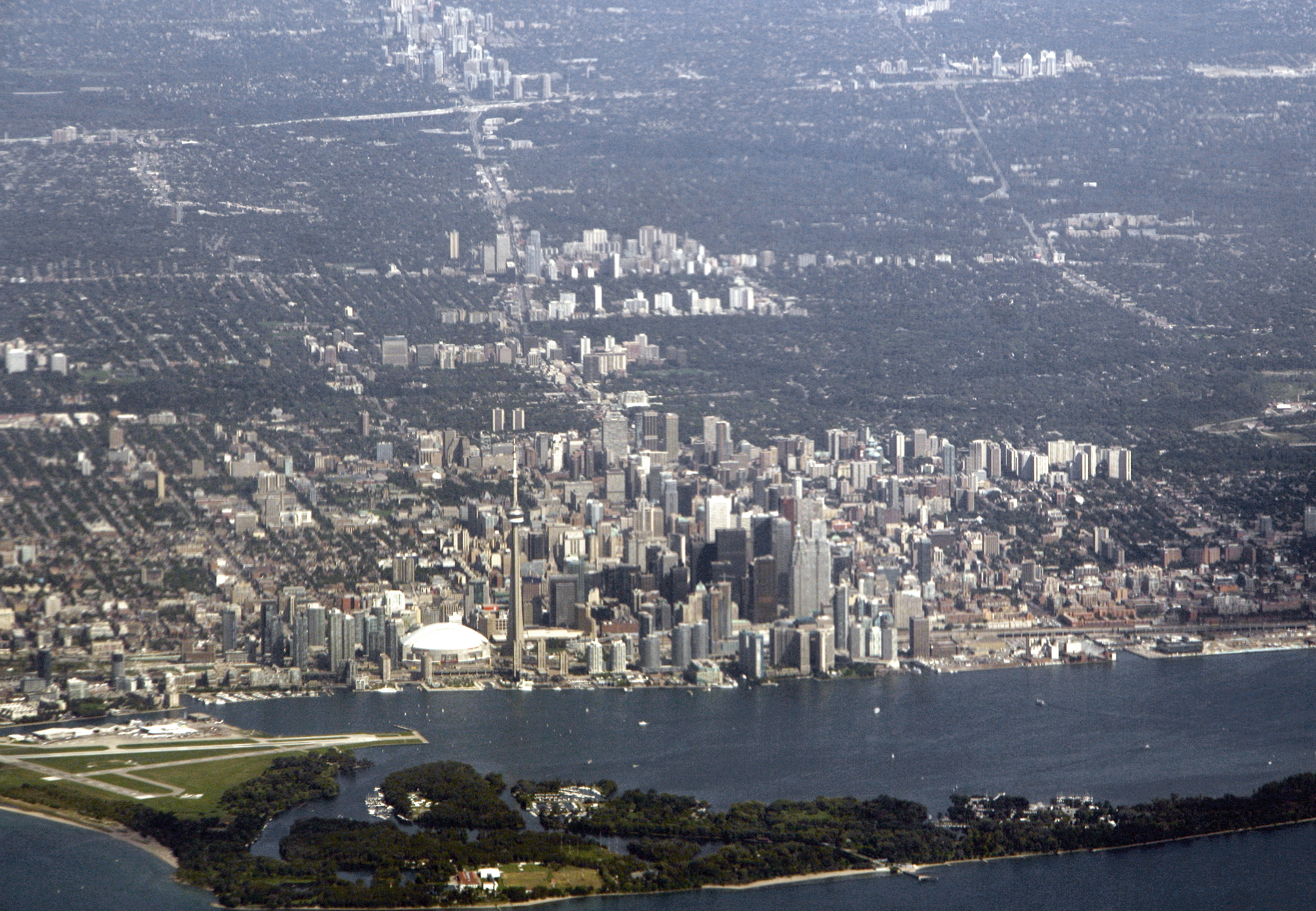
Toronto's Inner Harbour is bounded by the city's shoreline to the north, and the Toronto Islands to the south.

The makeup of the soil between the mainland and the island varies depending on the area of the harbour. Near the Western Gap (the western access point to Toronto's Inner Harbour), the sediment is made up of stone, whereas sand makes up the sediment near Billy Bishop Toronto City Airport, and the western parts of the Toronto Islands' north shore. Clay is more prominent in near the centre of the harbour, whereas the soil turns to mud near the north shore, towards the mouth of the Don River.

=== Inner Harbour ===
The Inner Harbour is used by pleasure boats and commercial vessels. The Port of Toronto is operated by PortsToronto and is located on the eastern shore of the harbour. The port consists of cargo facilities and the International Marine Passenger Terminal, a passenger ship dock on the eastern shore. The north shore has a mixed range of uses including Harbourfront, a conversion from industrial land to recreational and cultural uses. Harbourfront has parks, hotels, an amphitheatre, and many other facilities. The north shore retains one port-related industrial use, the Redpath Sugar Refinery, while most of the lands have been converted to other uses. The Jack Layton Ferry Terminal is located at the foot of Bay Street and pleasure and party cruise boats dock along the shore to the west of York Street.

The Toronto Islands are a chain of small islands located just offshore from Downtown Toronto, providing shelter for the inner harbour. Most of the Islands is parkland, although it is also the site of several boat clubs, an amusement park, an airport, and a small residential area.

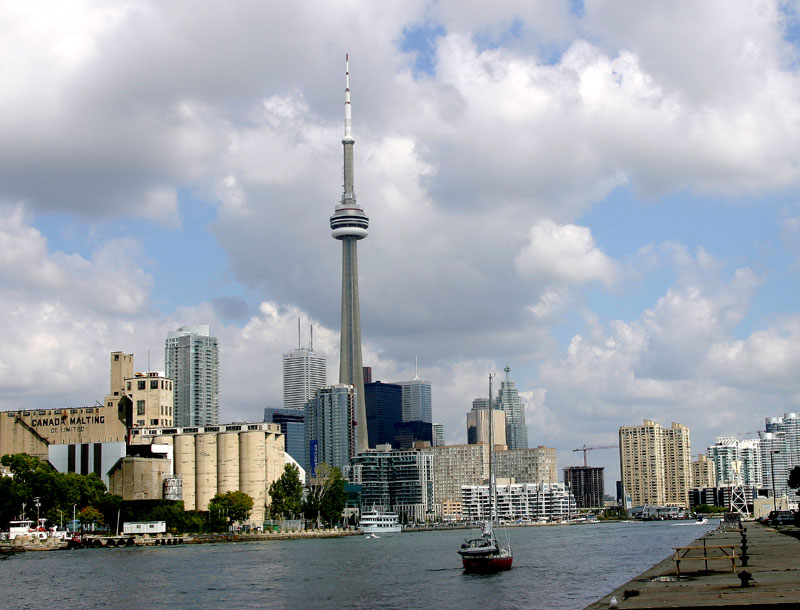
The Western Gap into Toronto's inner harbour

The Western Gap is a 120 metres (390 ft) wide channel allowing western access to the Inner Harbour. The gap is deep enough (over 31 metres) to allow large ships (like lake freighters) to enter and exit into the Inner Harbour. The Billy Bishop Toronto City Airport is located on the south side of the channel and is accessed by ferry and tunnel. Before the Western Gap was dug in 1910, the waterway was wide with a shallow sandy shoal surrounding what became Hanlan's Point. The sands were deposited on either side of the new channel and are part of the airport lands.

The Eastern Gap is an approximately 200 metres (660 ft) wide passage between Ward's Island and the western edge of the Port Lands and used by most freighters to enter into the inner harbour and port facilities. The gap was first formed from 1852 to 1858 when storms caused a break in the sandy spit that connected the area with the mainland.

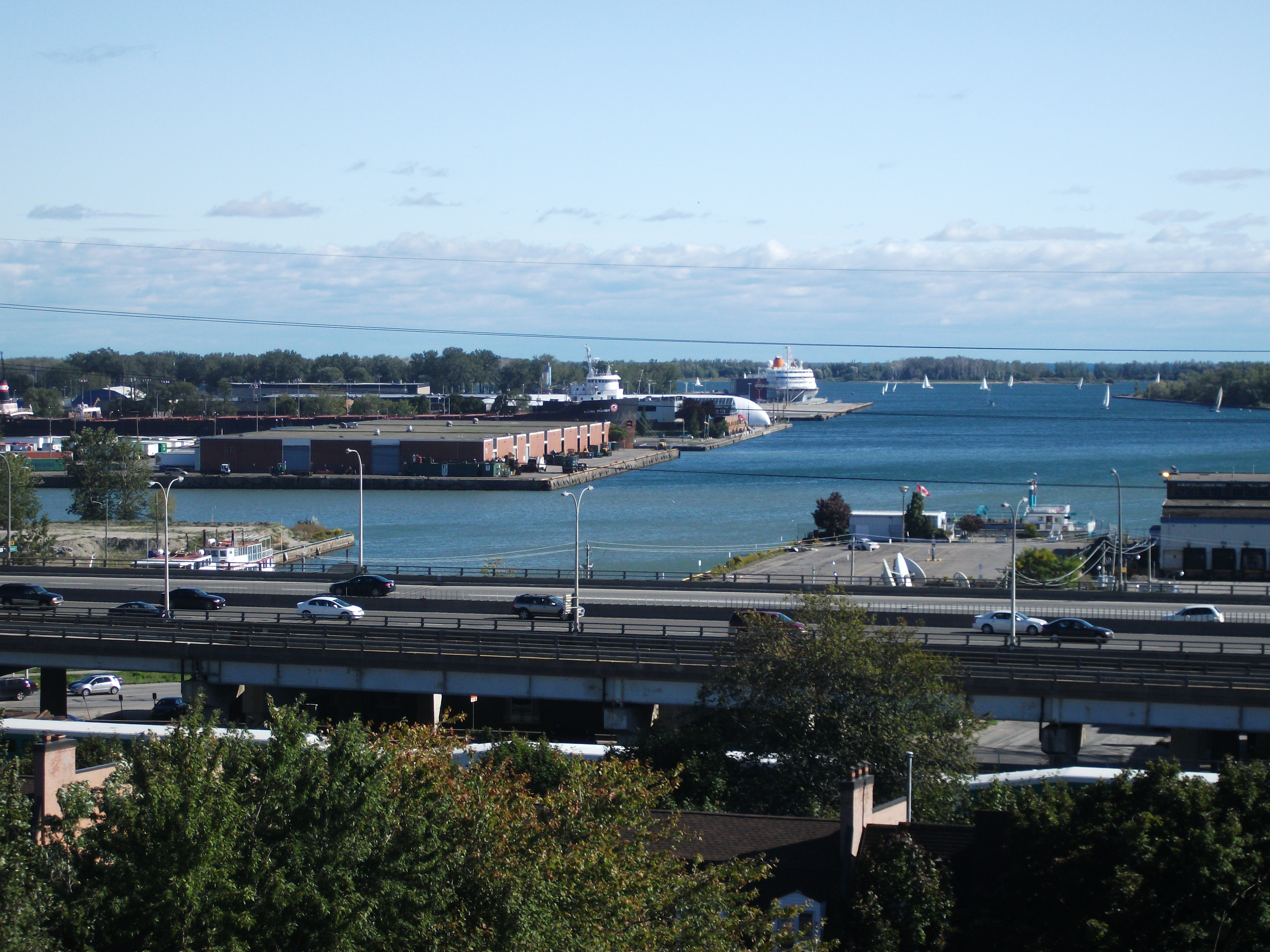
The Eastern Gap into Toronto's inner harbour

Prior to the 1800s, small boat users had to use a portage on the western end of the sandy spit peninsula (thus requiring them to travel a short distance on land) from Lake Ontario to the inner harbour. After 1858, the Harbour Trust made the temporary channel into a permanent waterway.

=== Outer Harbour ===
Toronto also has a second harbour, referred to as the Outer Harbour. The City of Toronto's Cherry Beach (formerly Clarke Beach Park), located on the north side of the Outer Harbour, is popular in summer. It typically meets high water quality, environmental and safety standards. A proposed 37-kilometre (23 mi) Lake Ontario Park by Waterfront Toronto would pass through the Outer Harbour. The City of Toronto operates a marina in east end of the harbour. Eight community water-sport clubs, forming the independent Outer Harbour Sailing Federation, share a small strip east of Cherry Beach Clarke Beach Park.

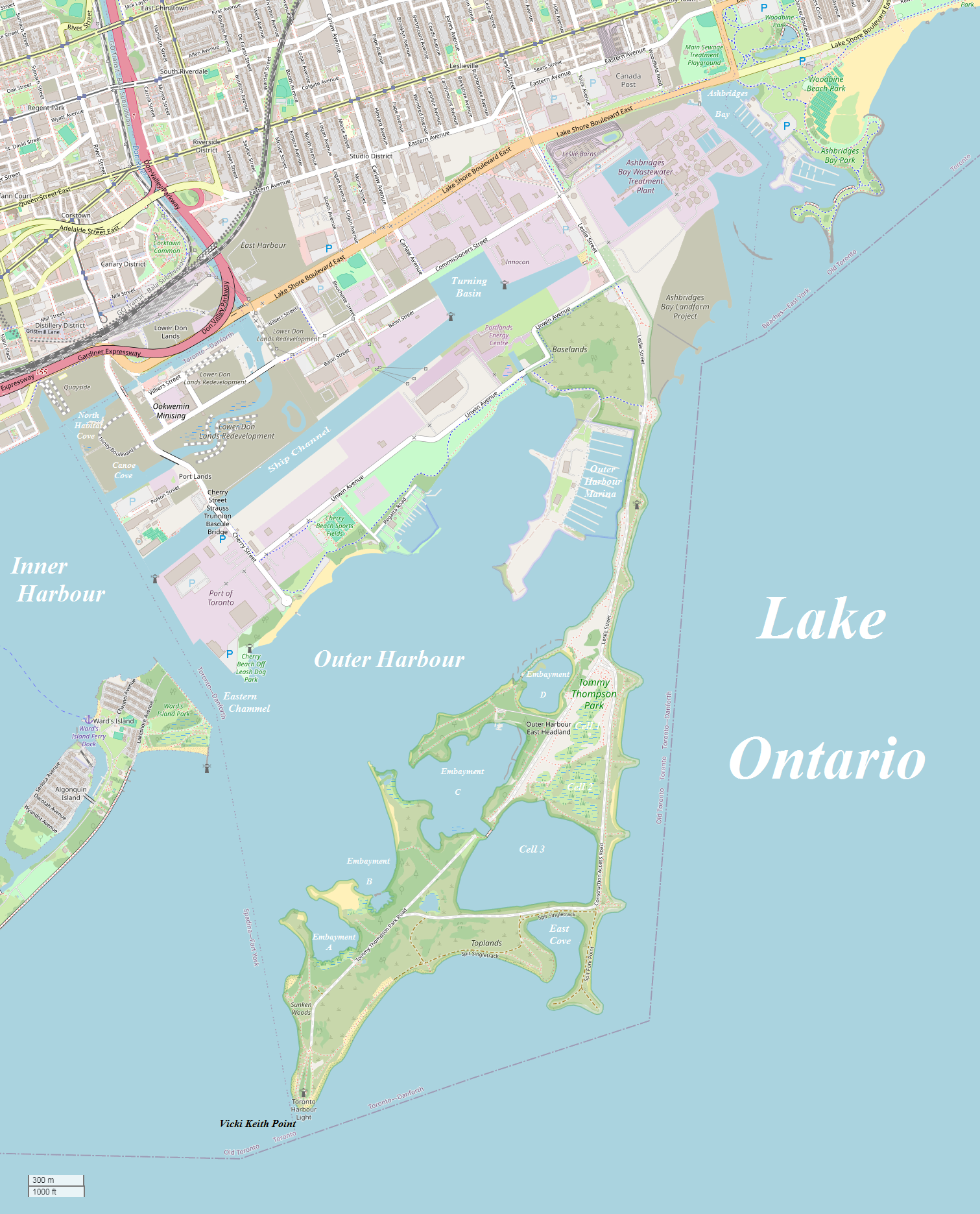
Map of the Outer Harbour and its headlands, known as the Leslie Street Spit

The harbour was developed in the 1950s and 1960s by the Toronto Harbour Commission through the construction of a new breakwater called the Outer Harbour East Headland. At that time, it was expected that there would be a great upswing in the number of ships calling at Toronto once the Saint Lawrence Seaway opened. However, the need for an extra harbour never materialized, and private boats are the only traffic usually found there now.

=== Gaasyendietha ===
Gaasyendietha is a legendary Loch Ness Monster-type creature and it is sometimes spotted in Lake Ontario and even within the Toronto Harbour. The story of Gaasyendietha is a Native Canadian myth from the Seneca tribe.

== History ==
The original shoreline of the northern shore was low sandy bluffs, just south of today's Front Street. The mouth of the harbour pointed west. The islands used to be a low sandy peninsula forming the southern limit of the bay. The Scarborough Bluffs are much larger bluffs that lie approximately 6.2 mi (10.0 km) east of the harbour. Strong lake currents over time washed the sand eroded from the bluffs westwards to form the peninsula surrounding the bay. The eastern shore of the bay, approximately six kilometres east, was a marsh around the mouth of the Don River. In addition to the Don River, a number of smaller creeks flowed into the bay. The original site of the town of York had half a dozen short creeks that flowed through it.

The town of York was established in 1793 in a ten-block rectangle bounded by the present Front Street, Berkeley, Duke (now Adelaide) and George Street alongside Taddle Creek. A government wharf was built to handle the transfer of ships' cargoes. A garrison at the entrance to the harbour, at the mouth of Garrison Creek, was established to guard the harbour along with a blockhouse on the island. In 1801, York became an official port-of-entry for immigrants and cargo. In 1808, the Gibraltar Point lighthouse was built on the island to guide ships.

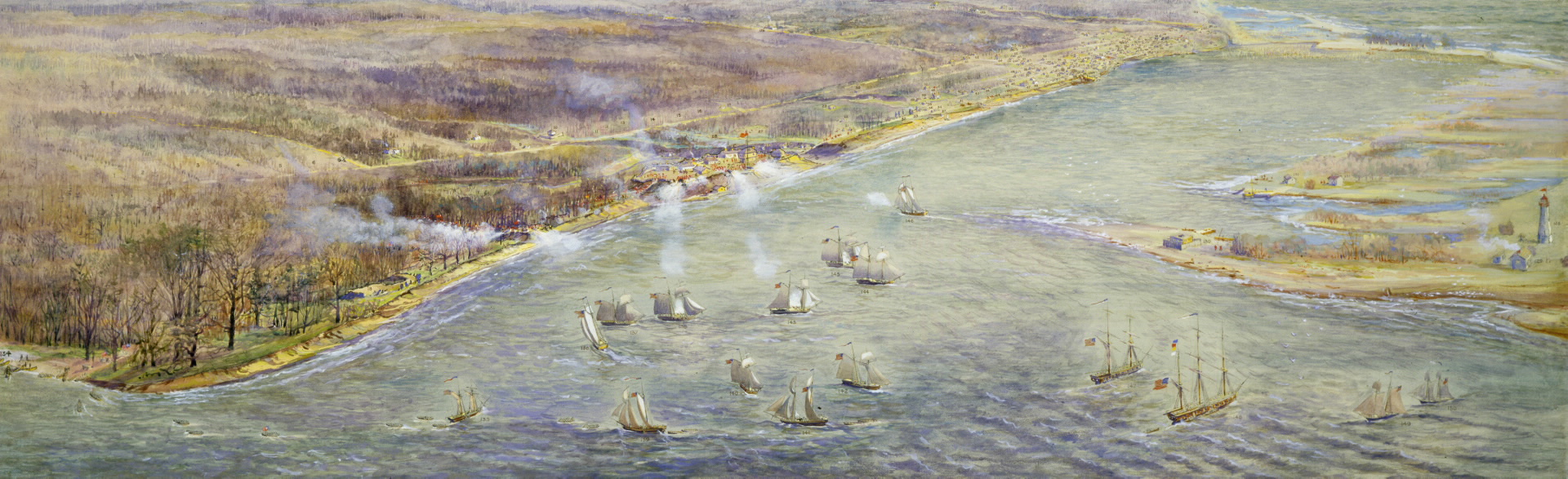
Depiction of the Battle of York in 1813. American forces moved to capture Fort York (centre), which guarded the entrance to the harbour, and York, the predecessor of Toronto.

In the early 19th century, cargoes destined for York would be transferred at Montreal to smaller boats such as Durham boats and batteaux to traverse the rapids of the St. Lawrence River. Although not fully established by the War of 1812, the British colonial army was determined to set up boat-building for the defences at York. Fort York, on the north shore of the bay, near the mouth of Garrison Creek, guarded the harbour's mouth. An armed schooner was under construction at the York Naval Shipyards when the Americans attacked and the British burned the hull rather than surrender it. The invaders occupied Fort York, looted the town and destroyed military facilities.

In 1825, the Lachine Canal was built to bypass the Lachine Rapids. Some of the boats used for cargo were now being built at Toronto Bay. By the time of the establishment of the Town of Toronto, three large wharves existed for shipping, King's Wharf at Peter Street, Cooper's Wharf at Church Street and Merchant's Wharf at Caroline Street (today's Sherbourne Street). The new Queen's Wharf, at the foot of Bathurst Street, was constructed in two stages, eventually reaching 244 feet (74 m) in length. Commissioned by the Province of Upper Canada, it cost £4,500. The first harbourmaster of Toronto, Hugh Richardson, was named in 1833. Richardson held the position until 1870. While the Queen's Wharf no longer exists, the Queen's Wharf Lighthouse still exists, eventually moved to a location off today's Lake Shore Boulevard in 1929. In 1849, the Harbour Trust was formed to manage the port and the Queen's Wharf.

In 1832, the Gooderham and Worts Distillery went into operation, using a windmill on the Toronto waterfront, near the Don River, to provide power. The Distillery had been conceived as a plant to make flour, but the distillery business was much more popular. By 1837, the mill was producing more than 28,000 US gallons (110,000 L) of whiskey annually.

By 1840, the entire waterfront was populated with government and merchant wharves. The Esplanade, a 100 feet (30 m)-wide road, was proposed, just south of Front Street, with new water lots made from cribbing and filling of the shore to the south. The waterfront was extended to a survey line from the point of the Gooderham windmill west to a point due east of the old Fort Rouillé. Ostensibly for carriages and carts, the roadway eventually became primarily the route for rail lines in the central core. In exchange for 40 feet (12 m) of the Esplanade, the railways underwrote the infilling of the harbour. The Esplanade and infill project was complete by 1865. A section of The Esplanade from Yonge Street to Berkeley Street still exists as a roadway and park. The rail lines moved to a viaduct in the 20th century.

The harbour saw increased activity in the 1840s. Harbour dues increased by 25 per cent between 1843 and 1844 alone. This saw an increase in the number of ships using the harbour. Donald Bethune operated a fleet of eight steamships out of Toronto harbour.

The peninsula became the Toronto Islands through the result of two storms and man-made activity. In 1852, a storm created a channel through the eastern edge of the peninsula that formed the south edge of the bay. The storm washed through excavations made for sand for local construction. In 1858, another storm widened the channel and made it permanent.

The first rail line to the harbour was the Ontario, Simcoe and Huron Railroad in 1853. The next rail line was the Grand Trunk, which underwrote the Esplanade project in exchange for an easement to enter the City. The Canadian Pacific Railway arrived in 1886, through the purchase of the Credit Valley Railway. Most of the area along the shoreline was connected to the railways. Manufacturers of products such as soap received raw materials via boat, produced the product at their location on the harbour, and distributed it via rail.

As well as cargo, the harbour also became a major passenger waypoint. By the 1880s, the harbour was handling 1,250,000 passengers annually through passenger steamship docks at the foot of Yonge Street. Passenger boats operated on Lake Ontario and the St. Lawrence River. Excursions to Niagara also departed from the Yonge Street docks.

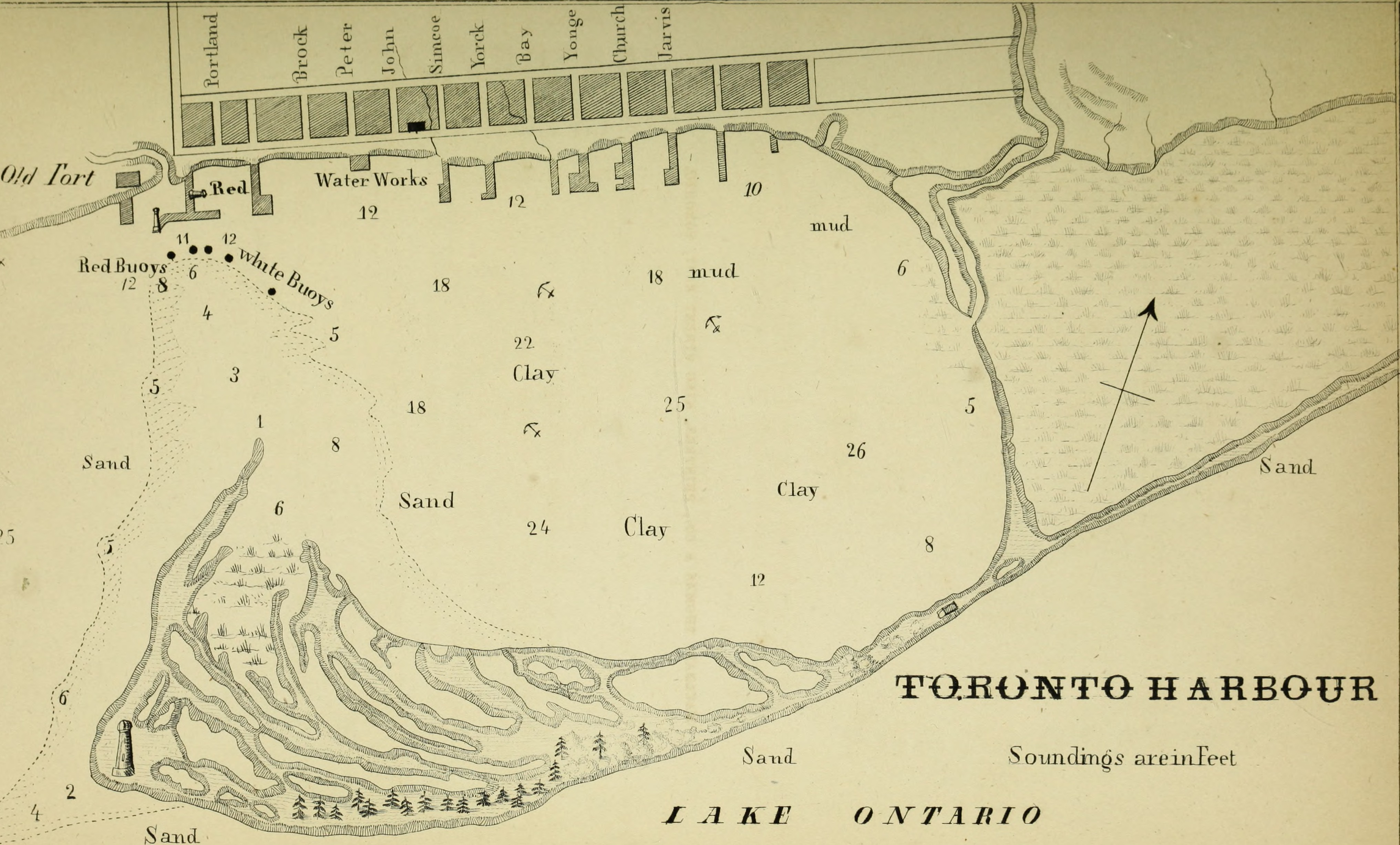
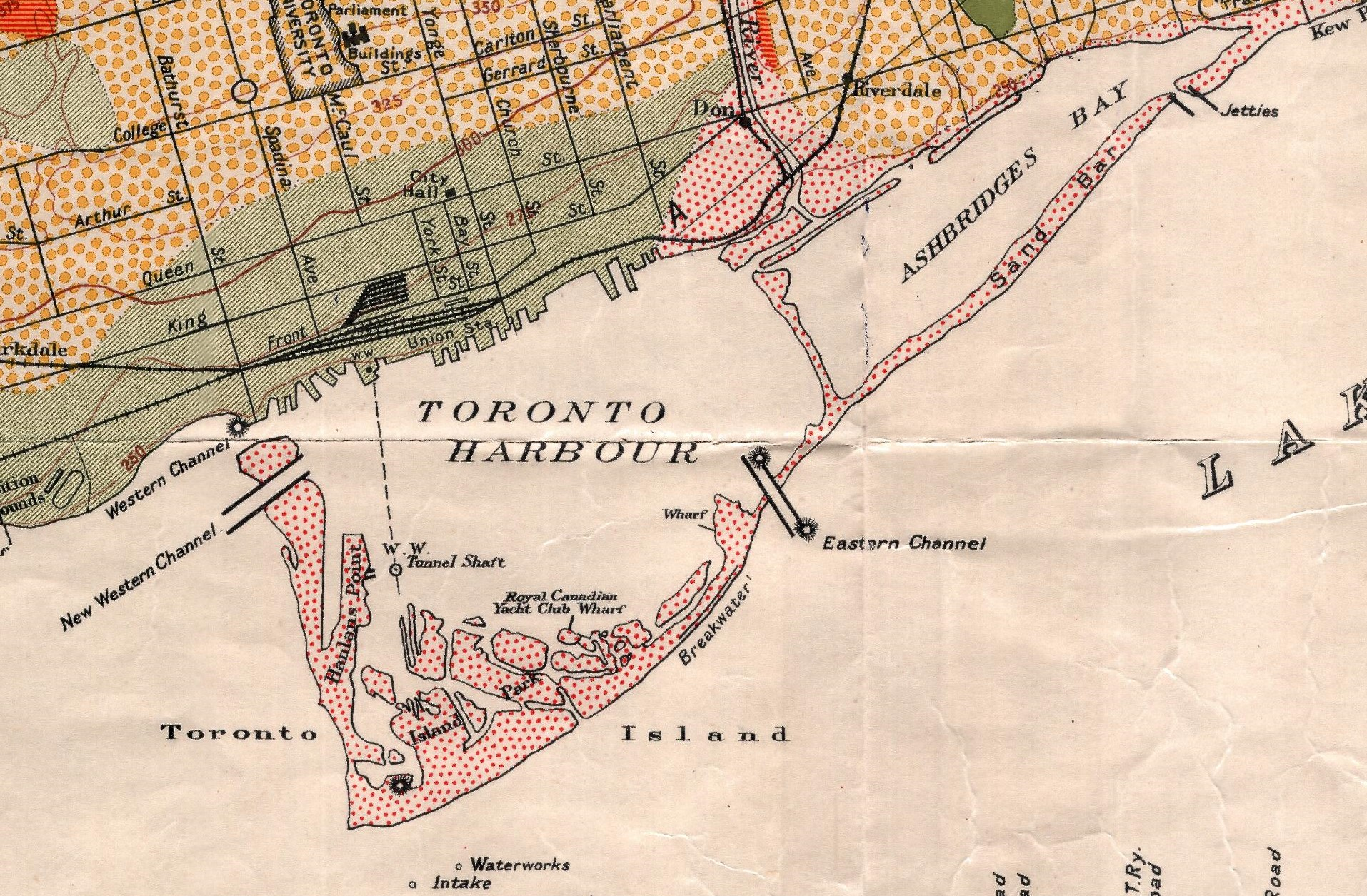
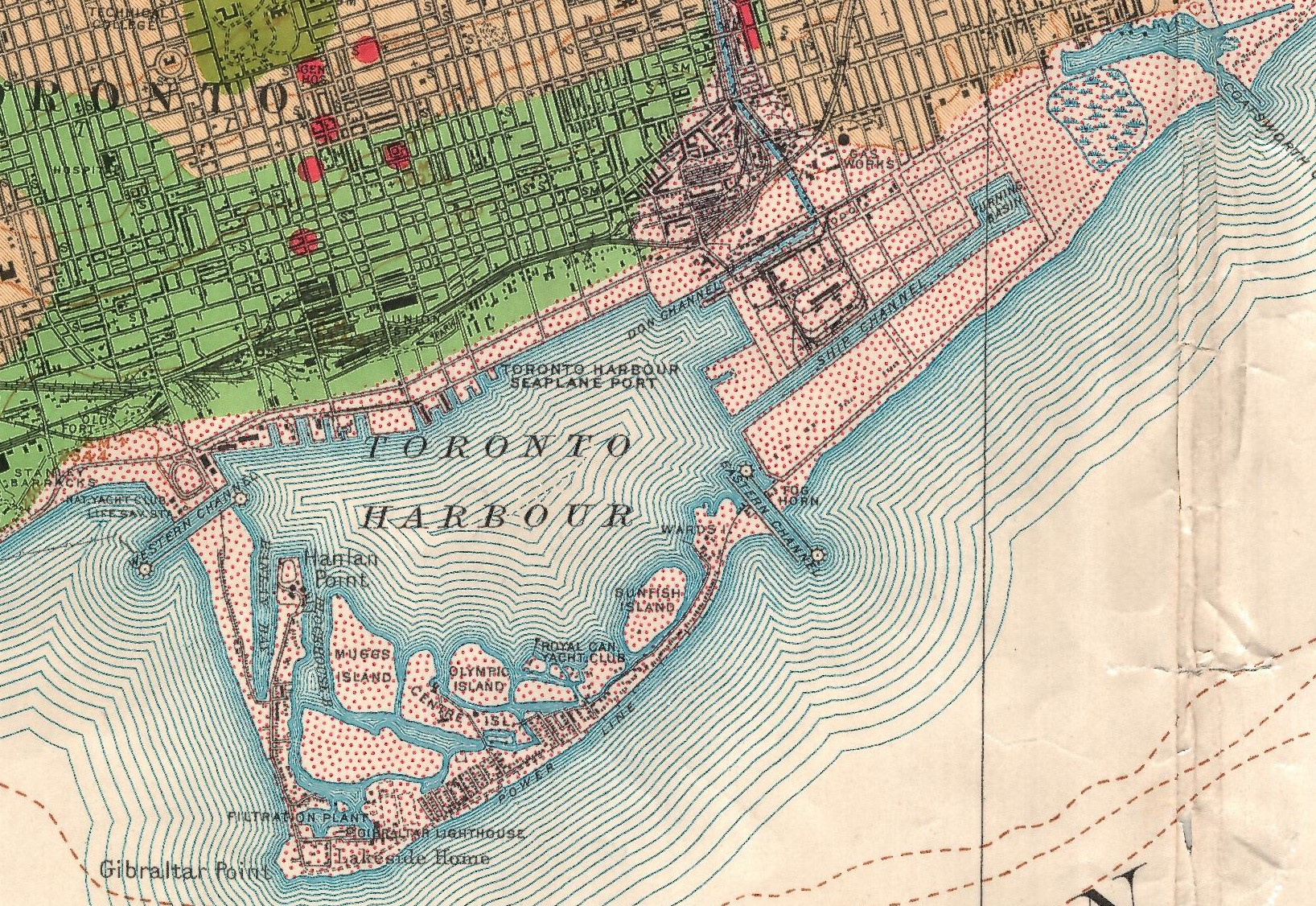
Harbour in 1857, 1913 and 1932

The western channel's depth was found to be too shallow by 1906 when the steam barge Resolute sank outside the harbour during a storm. The barge was unable to shelter in the harbour. The Queen's Wharf area was rebuilt during the years of 1908 to 1911 by the federal government. The existing channel could not be dredged to a lower depth, as its bottom was solid rock, so a new, deeper, western channel was dug 1,300 feet (400 m) to the south of the existing one. The sand removed for the new channel created a total of 45 acres (18 ha) of new land, split evenly to the north and the south of the new channel. The Queen's Wharf site became the eventual site of the Loblaws warehouse at the intersection of Bathurst Street and Fleet Street. The rebuilding of the Loblaws warehouse in the 2010s uncovered an old boat, left in the landfill when the Queen's Wharf area was filled in.

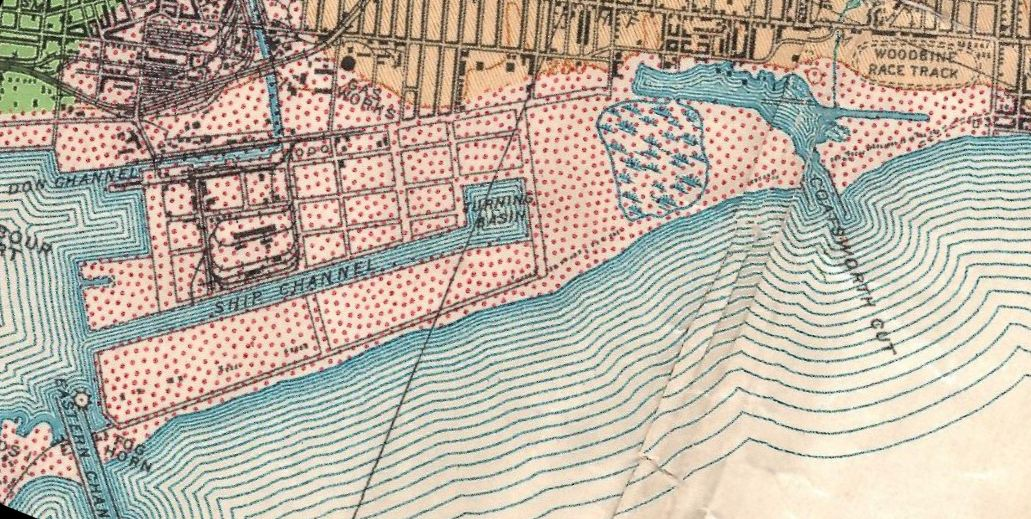
Map of the Port Lands in 1932. The area was once a marsh known as Ashbridge's Bay, before land reclamation projects in the 1910s created the Port Lands.

The 1910 Toronto Board of Trade proposal for the Ashbridge's Bay was for an industrial district for industrial offices and sites served by railway lines, public warehouses alongside docking facilities south of Keating Channel to the Eastern Gap and parkland/recreational strip at the south end. In 1911, the Toronto Harbour Commission was created. The lands of the waterfront that were owned by the City of Toronto were transferred to the Commission to administer. In 1912, the commission delivered its first plan for the harbour and the waterfront from the Humber River in the west, to Woodbine Avenue to the east. The Commission dredged the harbour to a depth of 24 feet (7.3 m) to match the new Welland Canal.

As the city of Toronto grew the northern shore of the bay was further altered by landfill, and has been moved approximately 500 metres (550 yd) south. After the Esplanade landfill, the second landfill project in 1910 filled the water lots, which extended the shoreline south of today's Lake Shore Boulevard, providing room for the Terminal Warehouse, the Toronto Harbour Commission Building and other facilities along the new Queen's Quay. The final infill on the north shore was in the 1950s, from Yonge Street east to the Don River, providing room for the Redpath Sugar Refinery, the Victory Soy Mills and several marine terminals.

In the 1920s, most of the low-lying marsh of Ashbridge's Bay was filled in to create Toronto's inner harbour area (with the small section to the east and the shipping channel the only reminder of the body of water). In the 1930s, the waters of Hanlan's Bay on the western point of the islands were infilled to create the Toronto Island Airport.

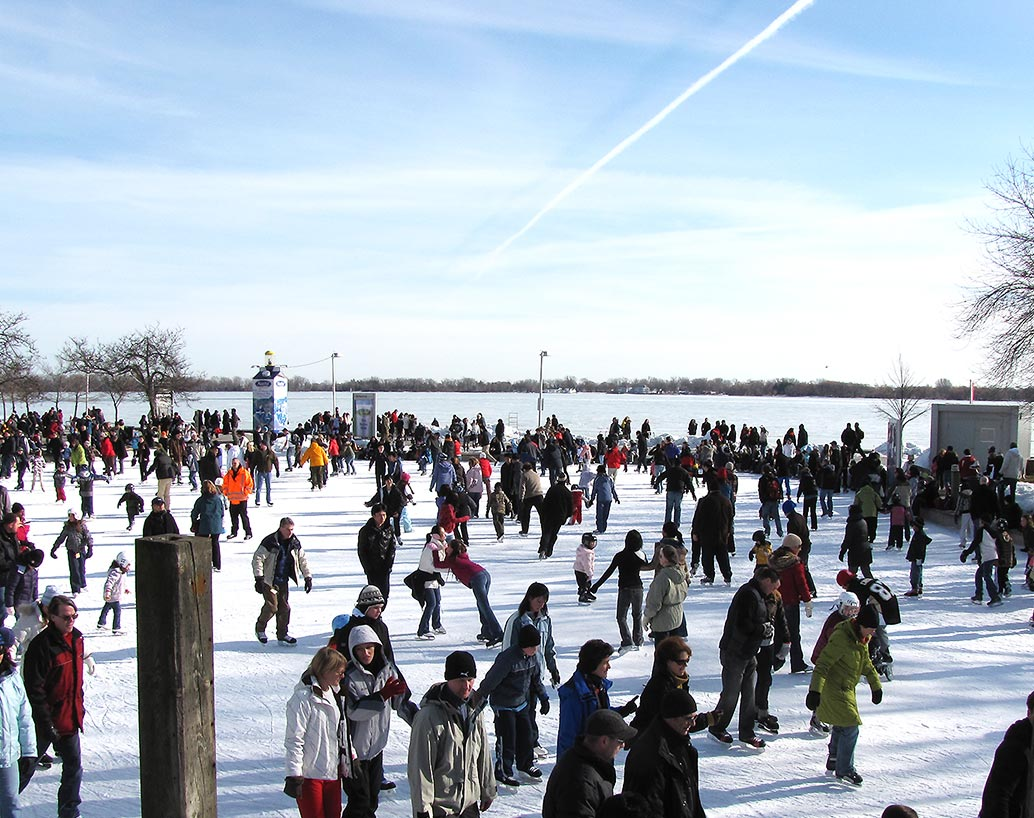
Ice skating at the Harbourfront. Beginning in the 1970s, industrial lands have been converted to other uses.

By the time that the plans to build the St. Lawrence Seaway were announced, commercial usage of the harbour was already in decline. The previous infill on the eastern side created in the 1920s was used to build modern port facilities. In the 1970s, the northern shore was in decline and there was a new political initiative to rebuild the waterfront without industry in a manner seen in other cities. The Harbourfront project expropriated the lands west of York Street. Several facilities were renovated, such as the Terminal Warehouse, and others were demolished, creating space for recreational and cultural uses. The area around Yonge Street remained in private possession and a hotel and condominiums were built on the shoreline. The area east of Yonge Street remained in light industrial use under public possession. On the north side of the harbour, there are a few buildings left from the industrial period. Some are in use, such as the Redpath Sugar Refinery. Others have been demolished or are slated for demolition, including grain storage elevators at the east and west end of the inner harbour.

Starting in 1972, the Government of Canada spent CA$10 million ($75 million in 2025 dollars) to dredge and widen the Eastern Gap, making it the primary entrance to the harbour for commercial boats. The 10 billion cubic yards (7.6×10^{9} m^{3}) of material was used to build the aquatic park on the Outer Harbour headland.

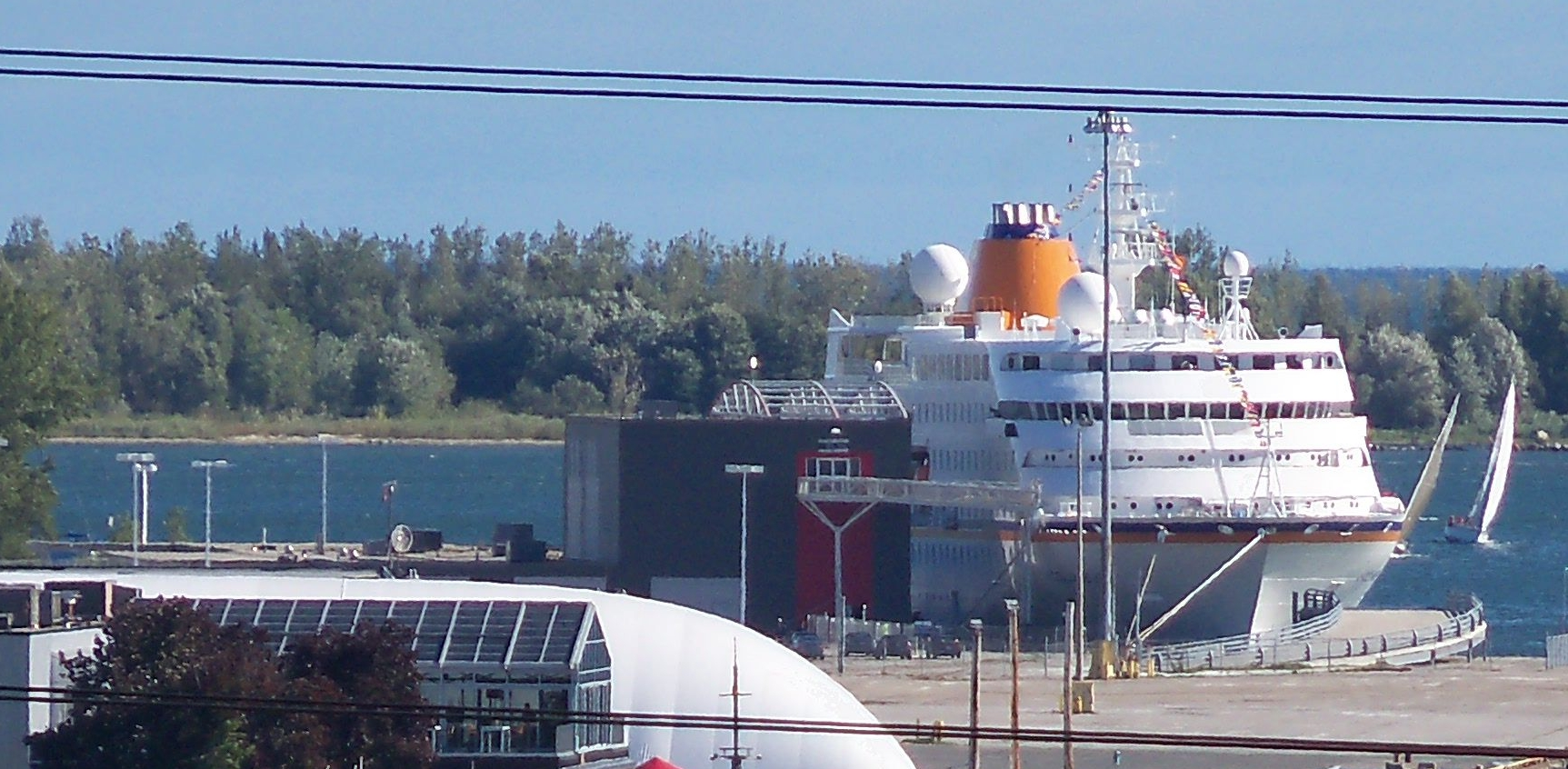
Small cruise ships moor at the International Marine Passenger Terminal approximately a dozen times a year.

In June 2004, the company Canadian American Transportation Systems (CATS) began regular passenger/vehicle ferry service between Pier 52 and Rochester, New York using the vessel Spirit of Ontario I. The service used a marketing name called "The Breeze". While Rochester had a custom-built ferry terminal, the Toronto terminal was a temporary facility, near the end of Cherry Street for security and customs screening facilities while a permanent marine passenger terminal was still under consideration for construction. CATS discontinued the service after only 11 weeks; among the problems cited was the absence of a permanent marine passenger terminal in Toronto and little Canadian interest in the service. The vessel was sold in a bankruptcy sale in February 2005 to Rochester Ferry Company LLC, a subsidiary of the City of Rochester. In April 2005, Rochester Ferry Company LLC announced that the Rochester-Toronto ferry service using Spirit of Ontario I would return, operated by Bay Ferries Great Lakes Limited and using the marketing name The Cat. The Toronto Port Authority officially opened the International Marine Passenger Terminal on June 27, 2005, three days before ferry service resumed. Even with impressive passenger numbers by the winter of 2006 the ferry service lost funding from the City of Rochester and announced that it would no longer be in business. The terminal building was later used for filming the CBC crime drama The Border.

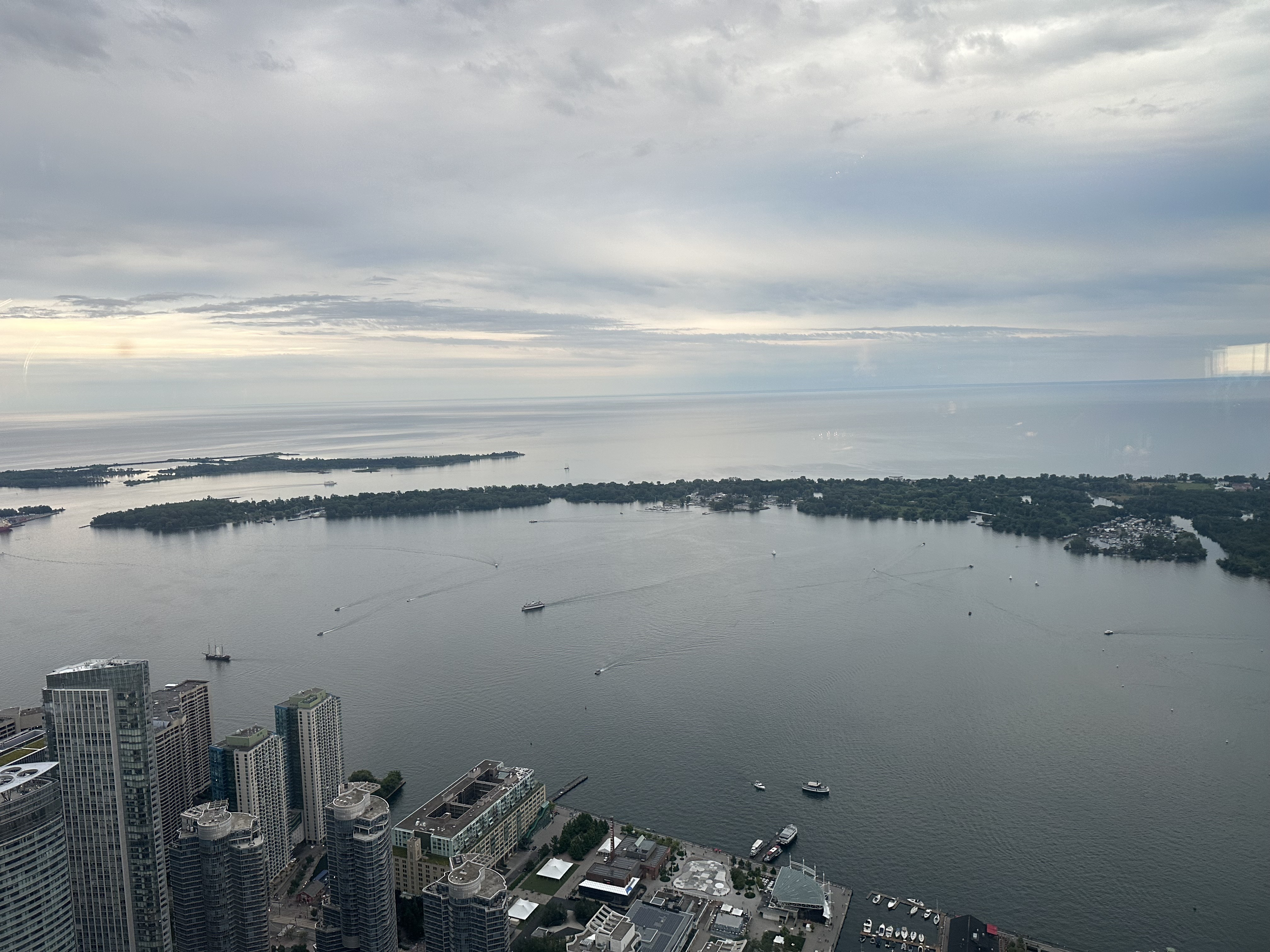
Toronto Harbour viewed from the CN Tower in July 2024

In 2018, Waterfront Toronto began construction on the Don River Mouth Naturalization, which will create another outlet for the Don River into Toronto Harbour. Essroc pier has been demolished and Polson Pier will be demolished. The bank on the harbour in these areas will be turned into parkland. A regulatory flood channel will spill into the Ship Channel. The project will be completed in 2024.

The original area of the harbour in 1834 was estimated to be about 2,150 acres (870 ha). With infilling, the area has declined to an area of 1,210 acres (490 ha) in size.

== Quays and wharves ==
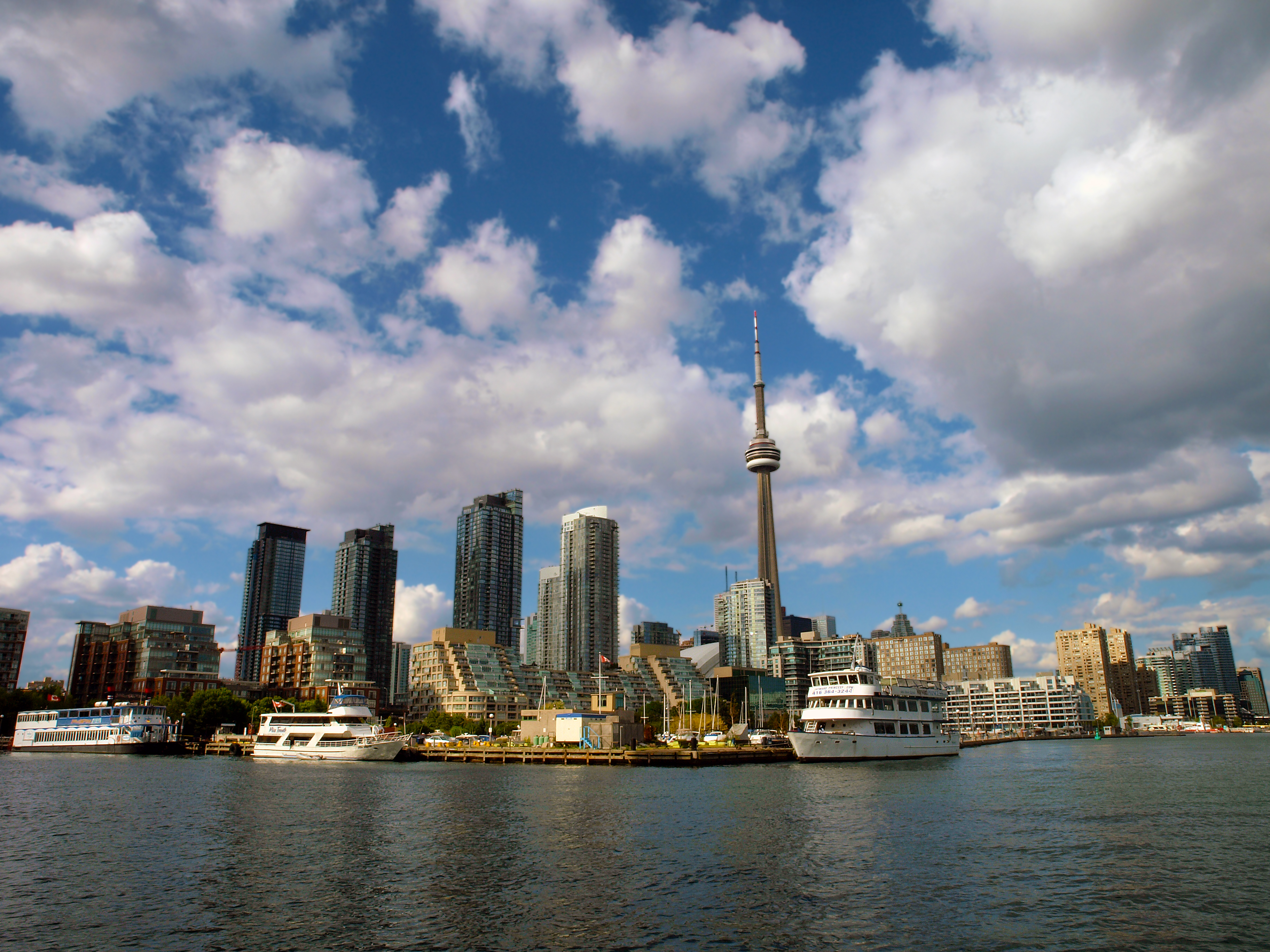
View of Bathurst Quay, one of several quays that still operate in Toronto's harbour.

Wharves existed along Toronto's waterfront in the 19th century, but they have since been replaced by quays. Most of the former wharves disappeared when the waterfront was filled in along with the now "missing" creeks of Toronto. A list of current quays/slips along the waterfront:

- Bathurst Quay
- Maple Leaf Quay
- John Quay
- York Quay
- Queen's Quay
- Yonge Quay
- Rees St. Slip
- Simcoe St. Slip

A list of former wharves along the central waterfront:

- Allan's/Merchant's Wharf – Frederick Street
- Commissariat Wharf – Peter Street
- P.D Conger's Wharf – York Street
- Cooper's/Feighan's/Maitland's Wharf – Church Street
- Dufferin Street Wharf
- Gooderham's Wharf and Elevator – Don River
- Hamilton Wharf – Church Street
- Higginbotham's Wharf – Yonge Street
- Hogarty and Grussett Wharf and Elevator – Simcoe Street
- Manson's Wharf – Market Street
- Millous Wharf – Yonge Street
- King's/Navy Wharf – between John and Peter Streets
- Northern Railway Wharf and Elevator – Portland Street
- Queen's Wharf – Bathurst Street
- Sylvester Brothers and Hickman's Wharf – Church Street
- Taylor's Wharf – George Street
- Tinning's Wharf – York Street
- Toronto and Northern Railway Wharf – Berkeley Street
- Walsh and Love's Wharf – Simcoe Street

== Ships of Toronto Harbour ==
Vessels found or associated with Toronto Harbour include:

Cruise and entertainment
Image	Name	First arrival	Last departure	Notes
Miss Toronto Cruise Ship along the Toronto Harbour shoreline.	Miss Toronto	1955		Cruises open to the public.; The original M/V Miss Toronto began operating in the Inner Toronto Harbour in 1955. Since then three successive ships have carried the name.; The current ship was built in British Columbia and is the first Miss Toronto to be constructed entirely out of aluminum.; Peter Ferguson captained Miss Toronto until 2004 when Captain Terry Turl took over.
	MS Jadran	1975	2015	Served as a floating restaurant at the foot of Yonge Street—the Captain John's Harbour Boat Restaurant; Gradually fell into disrepair, seized for back taxes, sold and eventually removed in 2015.
	The Empress of Canada	1980		Was known as the Island Queen V from 1980 until re-launched as the Empress of Canada in 1989.; Built by Hike Metal Products, Wheatley, Ontario
	Aurora Borealis	1983		Cruises open to the public.
	Jubilee Queen	1986		Designed to look like a "showboat".
	Oriole	1987		
	Showboat Royal Grace	1988		Cruises open to the public.
	Yankee Lady III	1984		First yacht both designed and constructed in the Toronto Harbour ever
	Yankee Lady IV			Designed and constructed in the Toronto Harbour

Ferries
Image	Name	First arrival	Last departure	Notes
	Mayflower	1890	1938	
	Primrose	1890	1938	
	William Inglis	1935		Built by John Inglis Co. Ltd., Toronto, Ontario; Originally named Shamrock, it was renamed after the death of Toronto businessman William Inglis, president of Inglis and Co.
	Sam McBride	1939		Named after Toronto mayor Sam McBride who was an island resident; Built by Toronto Dry Dock Co. Ltd., Toronto, Ontario
	Ongiara	1963		The Ongiara is a small roll-on roll-off ferry that continues to run year round, when the service's larger passenger ferries are not needed.; Built by Russel Brothers Ltd., Owen Sound, Ontario
	Thomas Rennie	1951		Built by Toronto Dry Dock Co. Ltd., Toronto, Ontario; Named after former Harbour Commissioner Thomas Rennie
	Trillium	1910		Trillium (launched 1910) was part of a fleet of ferries all named after flowers, operated by the predecessor to the Toronto Island Ferry Service.; Trillium is a steam-powered double-end sidewheeler].; Trillium was abandoned in a lagoon on Toronto Islands for several decades, and required years of work before she was ready to be put back into service.
	MV Kwasind	1910		Serves the Royal Canadian Yacht Club
	Windmill Point	1954		The Windmill Point is a small roll-on roll-off ferry, similar to the Ongiara, that has been permanently moored in the Keating Channel for years.
	Maple City	1965		Built in 1951; Had been a ferry from Ogdensburg to Prescott; A small ro-ro ferry, it carried 40 passengers and vehicles from a dock at Eireann Quay to the island airport
	David Hornell V.C.	2006		Owned and Operated by PortsToronto. Employed to carry passengers from a dock at Eireann Quay to the island airport; Named after Second World War Victoria Cross recipient David Hornell; Built by Hike Metal Products, Wheatley, Ontario
	Marilyn Bell I	2009		Owned and Operated by PortsToronto. Employed to carry passengers from a dock at Eireann Quay to the island airport; Named after long-distance swimmer Marilyn Bell; Built by Hike Metal Products, Wheatley, Ontario

Service vessels
image	name	first arrival	last departure	notes
	Nellie Bly	1906	1909	Tug named after Nellie Bly
	Charles A. Reed	1923	1964	Fire Services boat
	Fred Sandretti			
	G. R. Geary	1912	1966	Tug
	G.W. Rogers			
	Iron Guppy	2016	present	Replaced the William Rest
	J. C. Stewart	1915	1965	71 feet (22 m)-long tug
	Kenneth A.			A small tugboat
	Menier Consol	1982		Built to transport timber in 1962, converted to a floating drydock.
	M. R. Kane			Tug – originally Tanac-V246 and purchased by Toronto Drydock Company
	Ned Hanlan	1932	1967	A steam-powered vessel of approximately 200 tons.; On static display at Hanlan's Point.
	Ned Hanlan II	1966		Toronto Parks Department
	Rat	1914	1926	25 feet (7.6 m)-long tug
	Rouille	1929	1939	100 feet (30 m)-long tug; Served as port tug; Renamed HMCS Rouille, and assigned to Halifax to serve as a fireboat
	Sora			Fire Services boat
	William Lyon Mackenzie	1964		Fire Services boat; Built by Russel Brothers Ltd., Owen Sound, Ontario
	William Rest	1961	2016	Built for the Toronto Harbour Commission, now owned by Galcon Marine; Built by Eriau Shipbuilding & Drydock Co. Ltd., Eriau, Ontario

== See also ==
- SS Noronic
- Toronto waterway system
