= Queen's Wharf =

Queen's Wharf may refer to:

== Australia ==
- Queen's Wharf, Brisbane, Queensland
- Queens Wharf, Newcastle, New South Wales

== Canada ==
- Queen's Wharf, Toronto
- Queen's Wharf Lighthouse

== New Zealand ==
- Queens Wharf, Auckland
