= Thomas Rennie =

Thomas Rennie may refer to:

- Thomas Rennie (harbour commissioner), Canadian businessman and politician
- Thomas Rennie (ferry), a Toronto Island ferry, named for the harbour commissioner
