= Bagotville (disambiguation) =

Bagotville is a community in La Baie, Quebec, Canada.

Bagotville may also refer to:

- CFB Bagotville, a Canadian Forces base
- Bagotville (tugboat) a 100-ton tugboat
