= William Rest =

Canadian tugboat

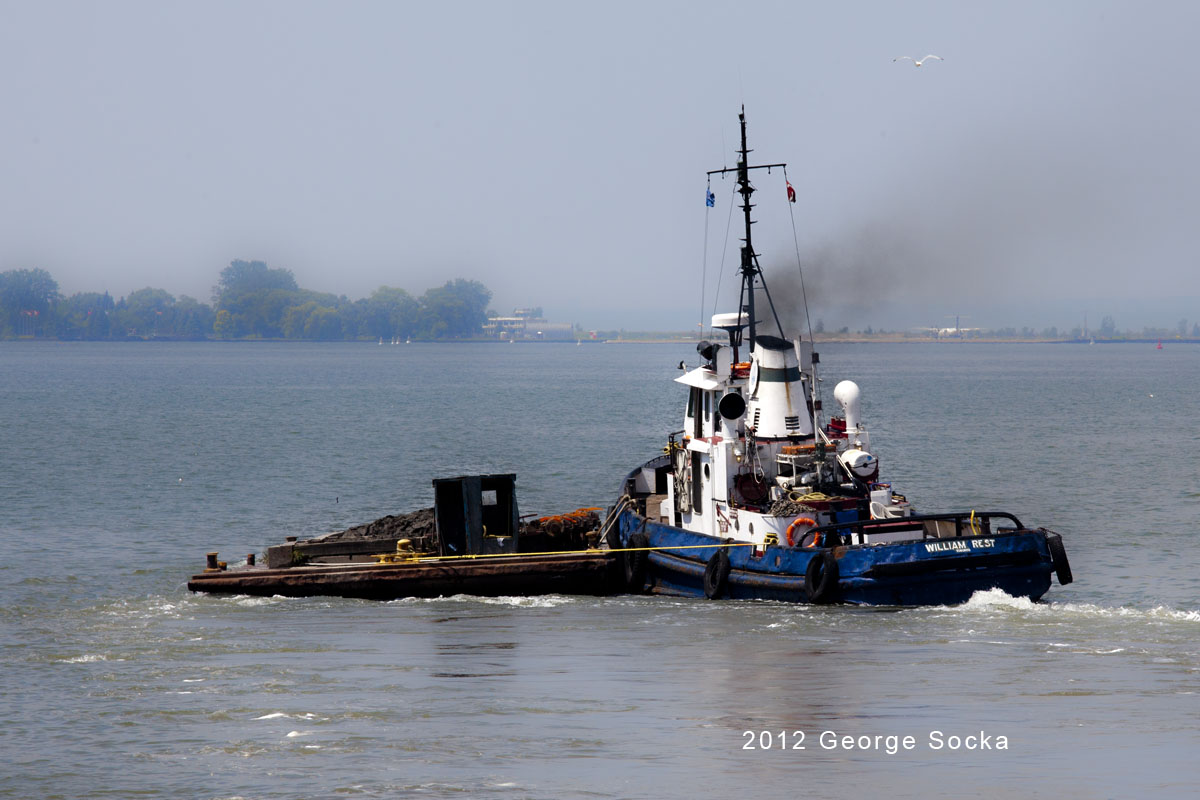
The tugboat William Rest, pushing a barge.

William Rest was a tugboat built for the Toronto Harbour Commission in 1961 for $150,000 CAD. She was built in Erieau, Ontario by the Erieau Shipbuilding and Drydock Limited. She displaced 61 gross tons. She was named after the commission's recently deceased director of planning. Rest had worked for the Commission for 46 years.

She was powered by a Caterpillar 379D which could supply 560 horsepower (420 kW).

In 1975 the tugs William Rest, Lac Como, G.W. Rogers and Bagotville tried to free the lake freighter George M. Carl.

The Toronto Harbour Commission occasionally employs the William Rest to break ice on the lower Don River.

Port authorities retired the William Rest when they commissioned its replacement, the Iron Guppy, in mid 2016. William Rest was acquired by Galcon Marine Limited, but it has not been in active use since 2016. In November 2022, the tug was seen being scrapped on the Galcon Marine premises.
