= Waterpark City =

Condominium complex in downtown Toronto

Coordinates: 43.636807°N 79.405940°W

Waterpark City is a condominium project in Toronto near Fort York and the Canadian National Exhibition, beside the site of the former Molson brewery. It stands at 114 metres. The building architect is Page + Steele, and it was developed by Lanterra Developments.

== Condominiums ==
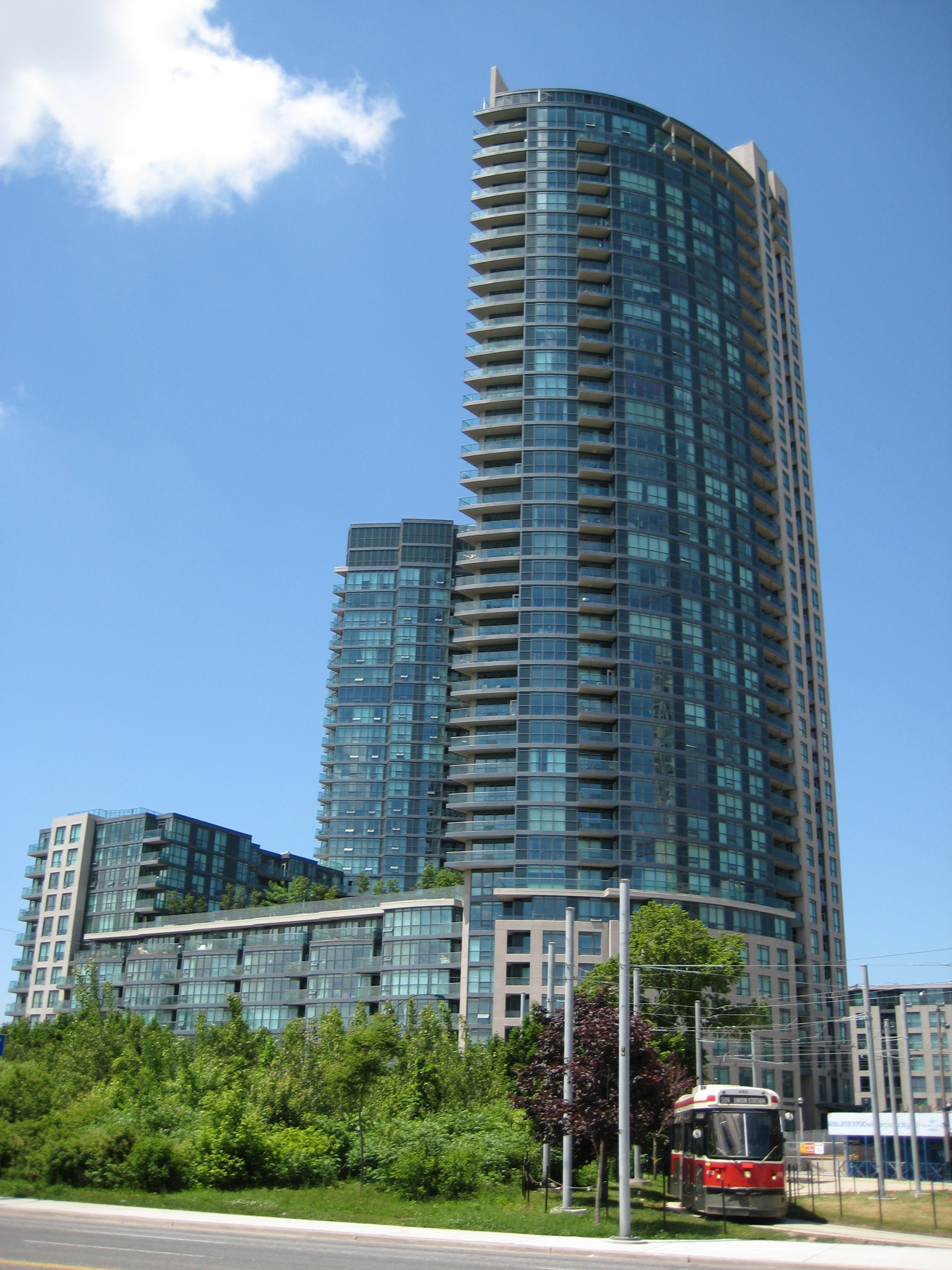
Waterpark City Aquarius

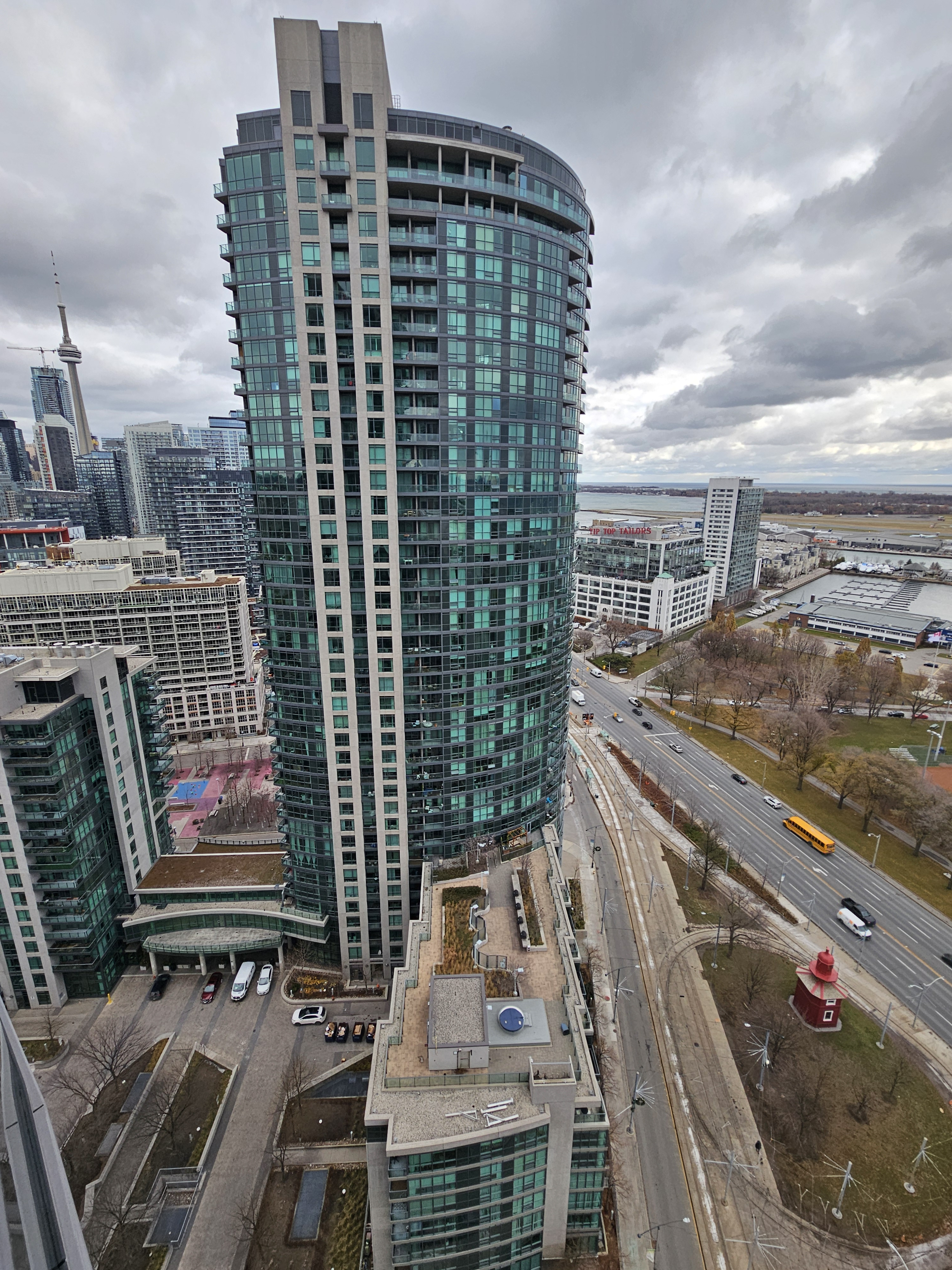
Neptune I & II condos view downtown Toronto.

The four condos built are:

1. Aquarius
2. Atlantis
3. Neptune I
4. Neptune II

There are a total of 1928 units between the four buildings. Amenities include 'Club Oasis' and 'Club Odyssey' gyms and pools in the two separate connected towers, and there is also an outdoor deck. It is one of many condominium projects in the Fort York Neighbourhood.
