= William Rennie (horticulturist) =

Canadian farmer, seed merchant and educator

- Born: March 15, 1835; Scarborough Township, York County, Upper Canada
- Died: July 24, 1910 (aged 75); Swansea, Ontario, Canada
- Occupations: Farmer, seed merchant, educator, writer

William Rennie (1835-1910) was a Canadian farmer who became a successful seed merchant, educator, and writer on agriculture. Rennie's parents were farmers. Rennie started farming his own 120 acre section (Concession II Lot 14 in then Markham Township and now eastside of Bayview Avenue south of 16th Avenue of Richmond Hill) in 1860. But in 1867 he rented out his farm, moved to Toronto, and opened a seed company that sold both vegetable and floral seeds. Most of his customers purchased their seeds through a colorful mail order catalogue.

Rennie retired in 1889, turning over management of his business to three of his four sons, Robert, John and Thomas Rennie. (His fourth son, William Jr, became a Presbyterian missionary.) After his retirement Rennie became the first official farm manager of the model farm at the Faculty of Agriculture at the University of Guelph, where he authored two books on farm management.

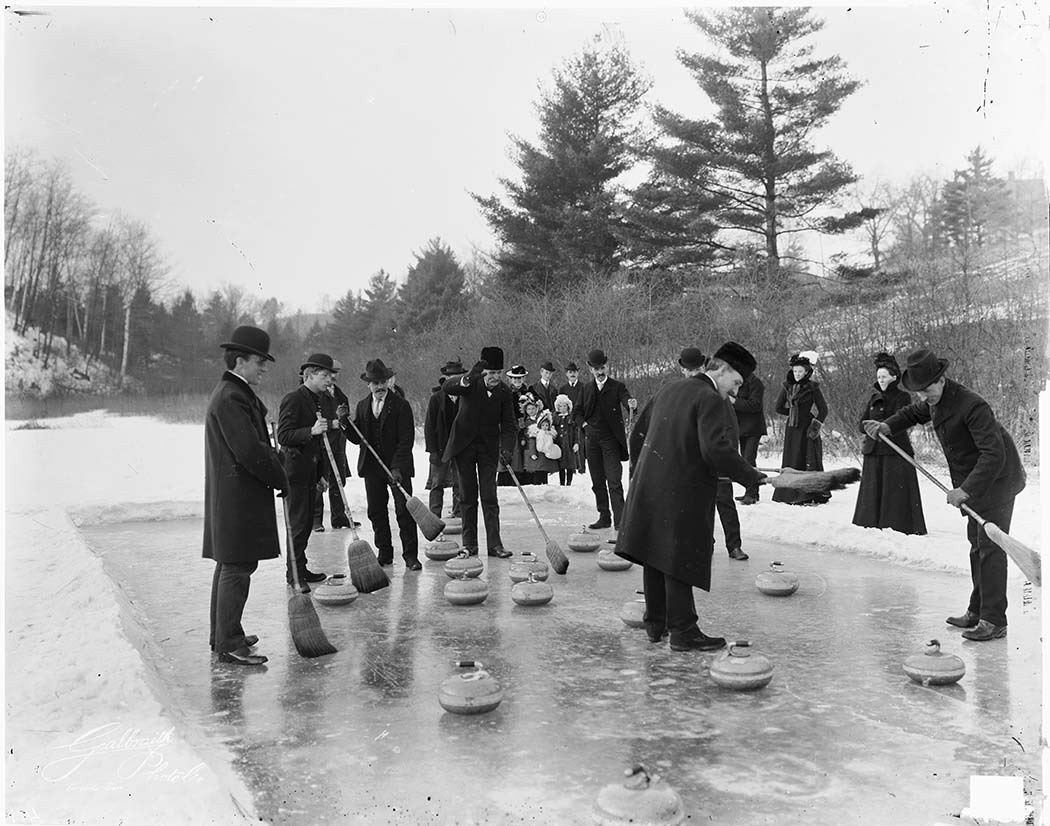
Family of William Rennie, curling, Swansea, Christmas day, 1904.
