= Robert Rennie =

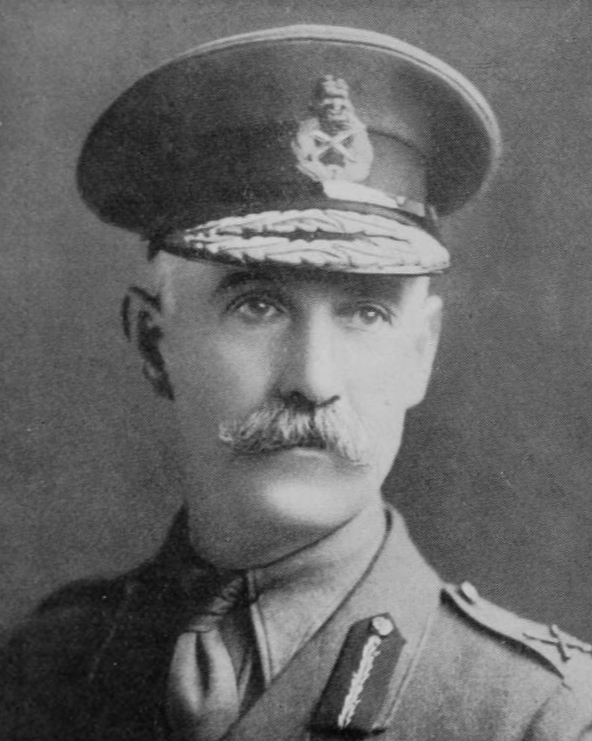
- Born: December 15, 1862; Markham, Canada West
- Died: December 17, 1949 (aged 87); Toronto, Ontario, Canada
- Occupations: Businessman, general, philatelist

Major General Robert Rennie CB CMG DSO MVO VD (December 15, 1862 – December 17, 1949) was a Canadian businessman and army officer.

== Life ==
Robert Rennie was the son of William Rennie, the founder of Rennie Seeds, a successful wholesaler and retailer of both vegetable and floral seeds, and Sarah Glendinning. William retired in 1888, and Robert and two younger brothers John and Thomas took over management of the firm. Robert served as the firm's president until he retired in 1925, when Thomas became president.

Robert joined a reserve militia unit, The Queen's Own Rifles of Canada in 1880. He distinguished himself as a marksman, representing Canada on the Bisley Team on three occasions and receiving several medals and prizes for his marksmanship. In 1887 he was promoted to the rank of provisional second lieutenant.

By 1914, when World War I began, Rennie was a lieutenant colonel, and commanded the third battalion of the Canadian Expeditionary Force. During the war he was promoted to brigadier general, commanded the 4th Canadian Brigade of the 2nd Canadian Division, and was promoted to major general after the war on September 16, 1921

In the 1921 Federal election, Robert ran unsuccessfully as a candidate for the Liberal Party of Canada, for the Federal riding of North Toronto after he stepped down from the family firm.

In 1946 Robert and his younger brother Thomas filed objections when Jaroslav Racek filed a request to change his name to Gilbert Rennie. Racek was a naturalized Canadian of Czech descent, who had lived in Canada for twenty-one years. McCutcheon suggested their objections were motivated by bigotry.

Thomas and Robert Rennie filed objections that were couched in legal principles but were actually based, according to the lawyer for the Rennie brothers, upon the notion that people of foreign descent should not be allowed to assume the proud Scottish name of Rennie.

Robert had been a stamp collector, while at the family firm. Since it was a mail order firm there was much opportunity to save exotic stamps. When the value of his portfolio dropped, following the 1929 stock market crash, Robert gradually liquidated his extensive collection of valuable stamps.
