= George M. Carl =

Lake freighter George M. Carl, beached off the Humber River in October 1975.

George M. Carl was a lake freighter with a 10,000 ton displacement.

== History ==
She was launched in 1922 as the Fred Hartwell by the American Ship Building Company in Lorain, Ohio. She was known as the Fred Hartwell until 1951, when she was renamed the Matthew Andrews. She was renamed the George M. Carl in 1962, and was decommissioned in 1984.

She ran aground off the mouth of the Humber Bay on December 24, 1975. The tugs William Rest, Lac Como, G.W. Rogers and the Bagotville were called upon to aid her. It required five days to free her.
