= Toronto Harbour Commission =

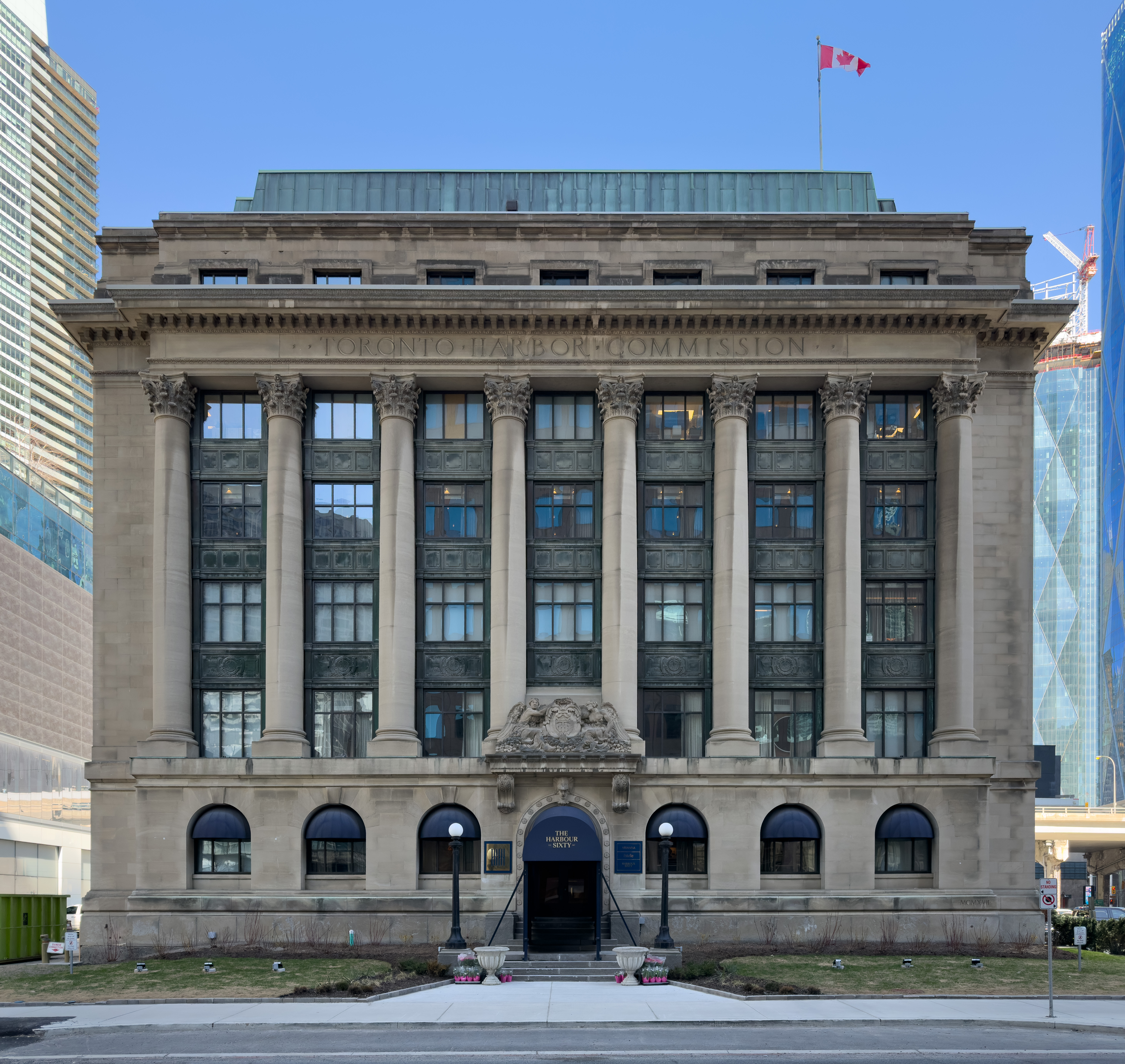
- The agency's headquarters in the Toronto Harbour Commission Building
- Successor: PortsToronto
- Formation: January 2, 1911
- Dissolved: 1999
- Region served: Toronto
- Owner: Government of Canada

The Toronto Harbour Commission (THC) was a joint federal-municipal government agency based in Toronto, Ontario, Canada. The agency managed Toronto Harbour as well as being responsible for major works along the Toronto waterfront. It built both Malton Airport and the Toronto Island Airport in 1939. The agency was founded in 1911 and operated until 1999 when the port operations were transferred to the new Toronto Port Authority (TPA), now PortsToronto.

== History to 1910 ==
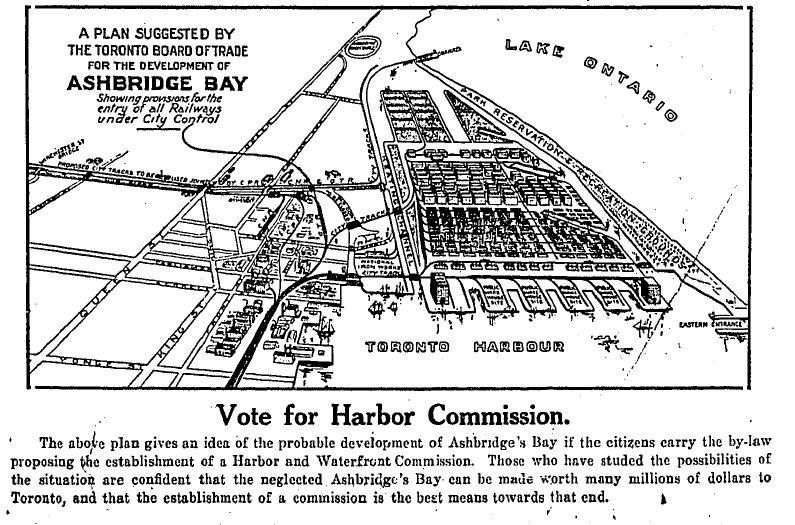
Toronto Board of Trade supported the creation of the Commission.

The Harbour Commission was the third organization to manage the Port of Toronto, after the Commissioners of the Harbour of Toronto, known as the Harbour Trust, formed in 1850. Prior to 1850, the harbour had had three commissioners appointed by the province of Upper Canada to oversee harbour works, in conjunction with the building of the Queen's Wharf, at the foot of Bathurst Street in 1833. One of the commissioners, Hugh Richardson, was named Toronto's first Harbourmaster in 1837 and he imposed wharf fees to pay for the Wharf.

The Harbour Trust was formed in 1850 at the suggestion of the Toronto Board of Trade. On behalf of port users, the Board expressed complaints in the operation of the provincial commission, which made no improvements in the harbour. The harbour was beset by silting problems which needed to be rectified. This second commission was governed by a five-man board, two from the City of Toronto, two from the Board of Trade and a fifth appointed by the province of Upper Canada, nominated by the four other members. The first work it undertook was to remove "certain stones now lying in the channel in front of the Queen's Wharf."

The Harbour Trust was also given authority over the Esplanade plan. The original 1817 plan intended to build a public walk and garden along the waterfront, just south of Front Street. The province's plan was largely ignored and the City allowed the use of the shoreline to be used for wharves and docking. In 1837, a new plan was developed for the Esplanade. In this plan, the Esplanade would be built just south of Front, and the waterfront extended south to the "Windmill Line", some 100 yards south. The new lands would be used for port uses. The Esplanade itself would become mostly railway lands.

The intrusion of the railways into the waterfront in the 1850s to 1890s period started to crowd out recreational uses. In 1892, a legal agreement solidified the railways' usage of the waterfront. In 1893, a new plan was developed to extend landfill another 600 feet (180 m) south, and a new Lake Street (today's Lake Shore Boulevard) established along the then-current waterfront edge. The problem of silting, and the increasing amount of sewage being dumped in the harbour, required ongoing dredging efforts. Other works by the Harbour Trust including a breakwater at the Don River and a breakwater at the Queen's Wharf to protect the entrance to the harbour.

The wetlands of the Don River were becoming increasingly polluted. Plans were developed to convert the area (1,000 acres in size) into usable lands. A planning advocacy group, the Civic Guild unveiled a plan in 1909 which advocated industrial and recreational uses for the land. The Board of Trade advocated the reclamation and infilling of the wetlands for port and industrial uses. The existing port facilities were inadequate when a railway strike occurred in 1910, forcing vessels to wait days to dock.

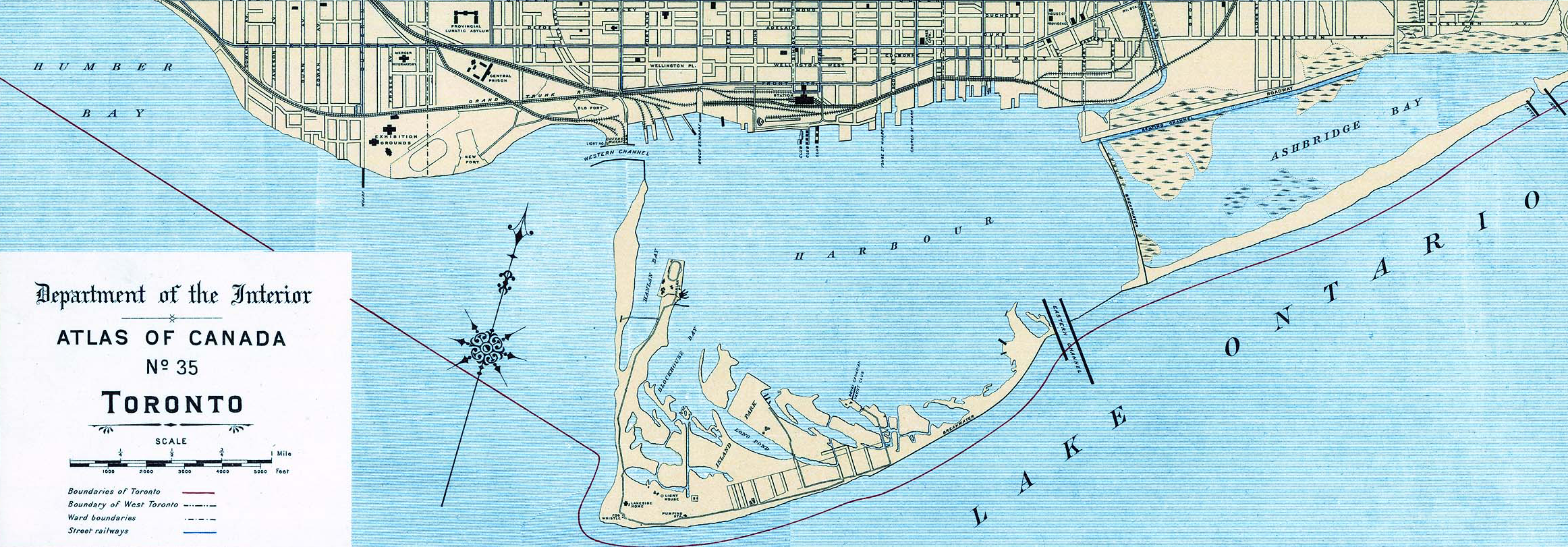
Map of Toronto Harbour in 1906 before the infilling of Ashbridge's Bay, the new harbour lands and the new Western Channel

== Development from 1911 ==
A referendum was held on January 2, 1911, to approve a new 'Toronto Harbour Commission' to take over the harbour and waterfront. The Toronto Telegram newspaper exposed the decrepit condition of the old harbour facilities, and the City and Board of Trade wanted a new Commission set up, similar to the Montreal Harbour Commission of 1908, with much-expanded powers over the Harbour Trust. The referendum was passed overwhelmingly.

The Government of Canada established the Toronto Harbour Commission on May 19, 1911 by an Act of Parliament. The commission was to manage Toronto harbour and waterfront lands in Toronto and provide for their improvement. Its initial plans included the cleanup of Sunnyside Beach, and a breakwater from the Humber River to Bathurst Street. In the central core, the Commission infilled lands south of Harbour Street to their current waterfront line. To the east, the Commission infilled the lands of the Don River marsh, for use as industrial and port lands. The bulk of these works were completed by 1925.

The Harbour Commission was the landlord for most of the Sunnyside Amusement Park at Sunnyside. After the Gardiner Expressway was built, the Harbour Commission transferred the Sunnyside lands to the City of Toronto.

In later years, the agency was responsible for the infill of Hanlan's Point on the Toronto Islands to build the Island airport. The agency also infilled the lands south of Lake Shore Boulevard south of the Canadian National Exhibition.

In the 1990s, the agency was requiring annual subsidies to manage the Island airport and the port lands. There were a number of harbour commissions in Canada and the federal government replaced the law under which harbours were managed, with the Canada Marine Act. Most ports were put under the authority of local governments and several were put under the authority of new 'Port Authority' agencies which would manage their affairs on a break-even basis. Toronto's was added to the Port Authority program, largely at the insistence of local Liberal MP Dennis Mills. In 2001, the new Toronto Port Authority was formed to manage the Port of Toronto, including the Island airport.

Also in the 1990s, the Harbour Commission transferred the Don River infill lands to the City of Toronto Economic Development Commission in exchange for an annual subsidy. In the 2000s, the Toronto Port Authority sued the City of Toronto for $1 billion over the lands, claiming that the lands were transferred illegally. The Authority and the City settled out of court in exchange for a promised bridge to the Island Airport and approximately $50 million.

== Milestones ==
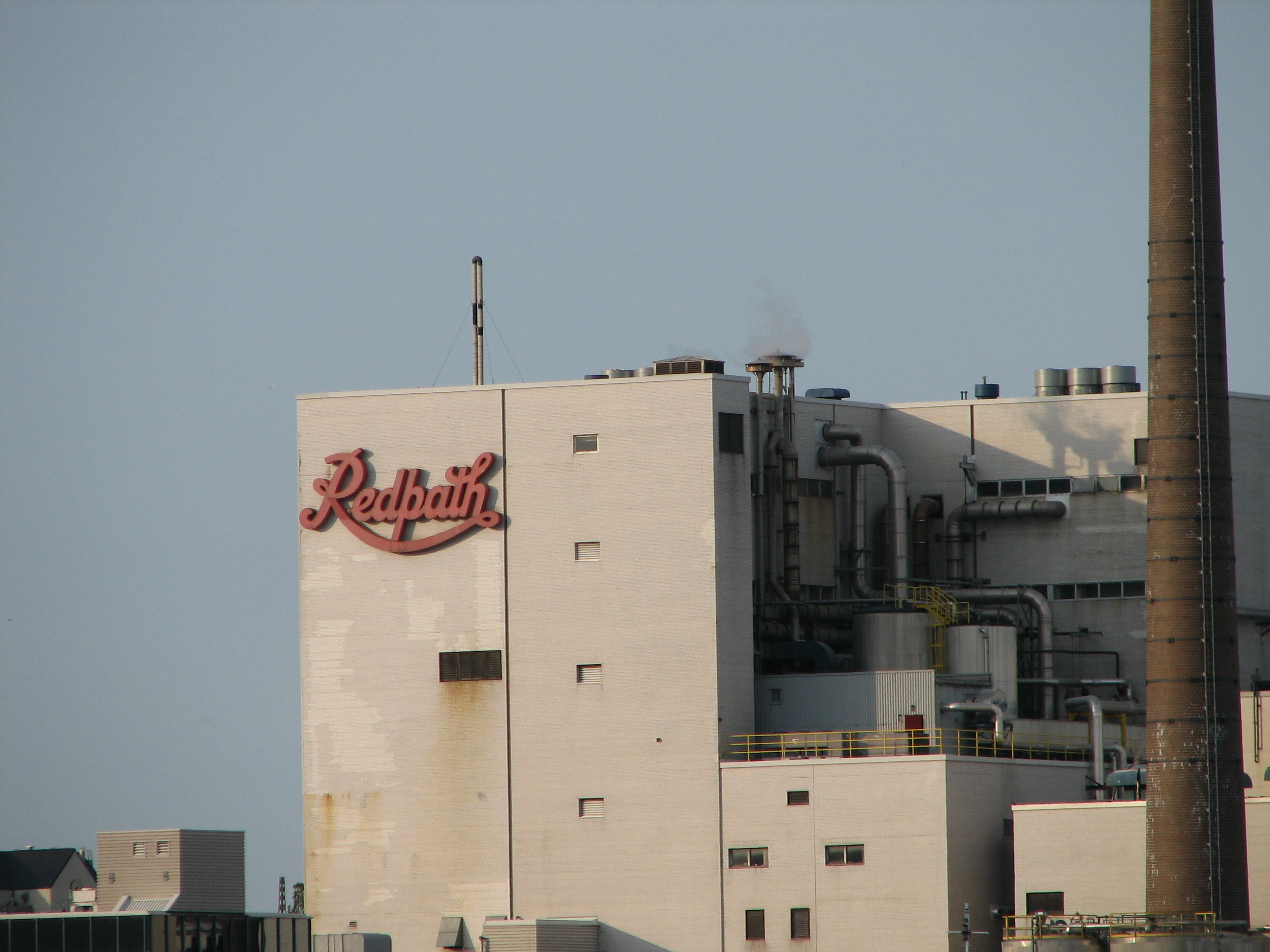
The Redpath Sugar Refinery in Toronto

Many of these milestones were documented by Wickson in 2002.

- 1911 - Toronto Harbour Commission established
- 1912 - $19 million waterfront plan
- 1919 - Harbour Commission takes over lifesaving service for harbour
- 1922 - Sunnyside Beach and amusement park opens
- 1928 - Terminal Warehouse opens at York Quay.
- 1929 - Central waterfront air harbour opens at foot of Scott Street.
- 1935 - Toronto approves of island airport, and tunnel to it across the Western Gap.
- 1935 - Federal government stops building of tunnel.
- 1937 - Construction starts at Malton Airport and Island Airport.
- 1938 - American Airlines DC3 makes the first official landing at Malton.
- 1939 - First plane lands at Island Airport. Cable ferry established to airport.
- 1940 - Norwegian air force starts training at Island Airport. First housed at Centre Island, but set up "Little Norway" camp at foot of Bathurst street.
- 1943 - RCAF takes over Island Airport and Norwegians move to Muskoka facilities.
- 1953 - Air traffic control established at Island Airport.
- 1955 - Building of Marine Terminal 11 (later renamed Marine Terminal 27) west of Yonge Street in anticipation of the opening of the St. Lawrence Seaway.
- 1955 - Demolition of Sunnyside Amusement Park.
- 1958 - Malton Airport transferred to the Government of Canada
- 1959 - Saint Lawrence Seaway opens and first vessel to reach Toronto is the Prins Willem George Frederik.
- 1959 - Queen Elizabeth II opens the new Queen Elizabeth Docks (later renamed Marine Terminals 28 and 29) between Jarvis and Parliament Streets.
- 1959 - Redpath Sugar Refinery opens on reclaimed land at foot of Jarvis Street.
- 1961 - New 4,000-foot (1,200 m) runway at Island Airport.
- 1962 - Opening of E. L. Cousins Docks and Marine Terminal 35
- 1962 - Harbour Commission takes over Island Airport
- 1963 - Leslie Street Slip (Ship Channel extension) opens.
- 1965 - Maple City island airport ferry replaces cable ferry in Western Gap.
- 1966 - Opening of Marine Terminal 51 near the Eastern Ship Channel
- 1968 - Harbour Commission unveils "Harbour City" concept.
- 1970 - Opening of Marine Terminal 52 and Container Distribution Centre adjacent to the Eastern Ship Channel (the Eastern Gap)
- 1972 - Harbourfront Corporation established by Federal government in West Bayfront lands from Bathurst to York Street.
- 1975 - East Gap becomes main shipping channel and is dredged to a depth of 27 feet (8.2 m).
- 1979 - World Trade Centre Toronto established in THC building.
- 1983 - Tripartite agreement established for passenger airlines at Island Airport.
- 1984 - City Express starts regular service from Island Airport to Ottawa.
- 1988-1991 - Royal Commission on Future of the Toronto Waterfront.
- 1989 - Outer Harbour Marina opens.
- 1994 - Transfer of THC waterfront lands to City.
- 1994 - Renaming of Island Airport to City Centre Airport.
- 1998 - Canada Marine Act passed;
- 1999 - Letters Patent issued by Minister of Transport David Collenette to establish Toronto Port Authority under section 8 of the Act

== Vessels ==
The commission operated the William Rest. The ship was bought for CA$150,000 and was operated from 1961 to 2016.

== See also ==
- Toronto Harbour
- Toronto waterfront
- Canada Marine Act
