= Thomas Rennie (harbour commissioner) =

Canadian businessman and politician

- Born: December 14, 1868; Markham, Ontario, Canada
- Died: August 4, 1952 (aged 83)
- Occupation(s): businessman, politician

Thomas Rennie (1868-1952) was a Canadian businessman and politician.

Rennie and his two brothers took over the operation of his father's successful seed business when William Rennie retired in 1889. Rennie became chair of the firm in 1925, following the retirement of his older brother, Robert. Rennie would later become a director of the Canadian Seed Trade Association.

He was appointed a member of the powerful Toronto Harbour Commission serving as its chair for many years. Popular historian Mike Filey wrote that he was appointed in 1930, was promoted to chair in 1936, and served a total of seventeen years. John McCutcheon, of Wilfrid Laurier University, wrote that he was appointed in 1921, was promoted to chair in 1938, and served a total of twenty-six years.

In 1951 the Commission recognized Rennie's contribution by naming its most recent ferry after him. Rennie's daughter, his only child, christened the vessel.

In 1946 Rennie and his older brother Robert filed objections when Jaroslav Racek filed a request to change his name to Gilbert Rennie. Racek was a naturalized Canadian of Czech descent, who had lived in Canada for twenty-one years. McCutcheon suggested their objections were motivated by bigotry.

Thomas and Robert Rennie filed objections that were couched in legal principles but were actually based, according to the lawyer for the Rennie brothers, upon the notion that people of foreign descent should not be allowed to assume the proud Scottish name of Rennie.
