= Iron Guppy =

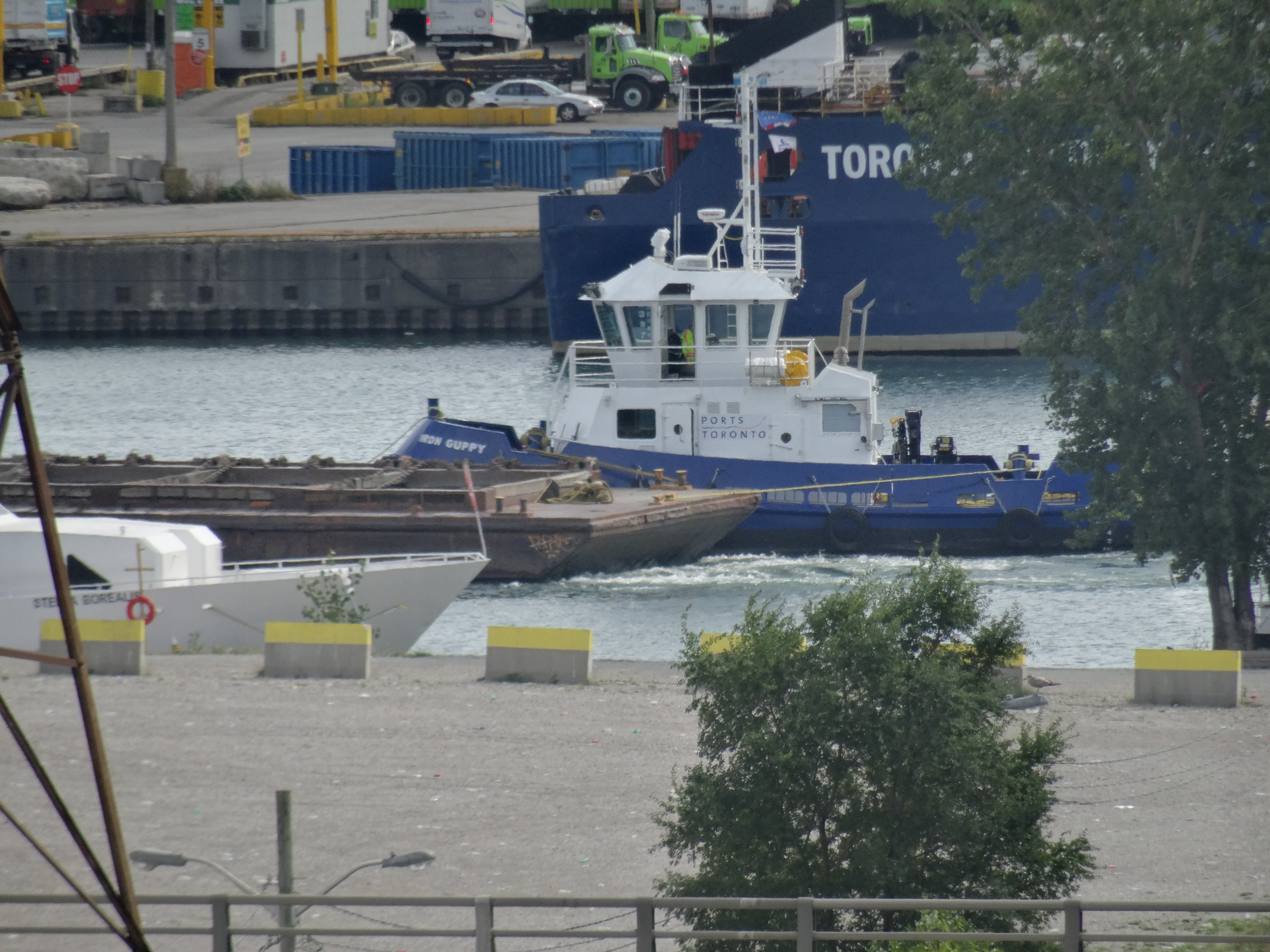
The Iron Guppy pushing a barge used to carry sludge from the annual dredging of the Keating Channel.

Iron Guppy is a tugboat, built in 2016, and owned and operated by Ports Toronto. She replaced the William Rest, a tugboat that served in Ports Toronto, and its predecessor agencies, since 1961. The Iron Guppy has very similar operational characteristics as the William Rest, however, with modern electronics.

The Iron Guppy is a single screw tug, capable of breaking ice up to 6 inches (15 cm) thick.

Ports Toronto called upon elementary school students to help pick the vessel's name.

The vessel was designed by Robert Allan Limited, ship architects, and built by Hike Metals of Wheatley, Ontario.

Fireboat William Lyon Mackenzie gave the Iron Guppy a ceremonial shower, to mark her commissioning, on July 23, 2016.
