= Queen's Wharf Lighthouse =

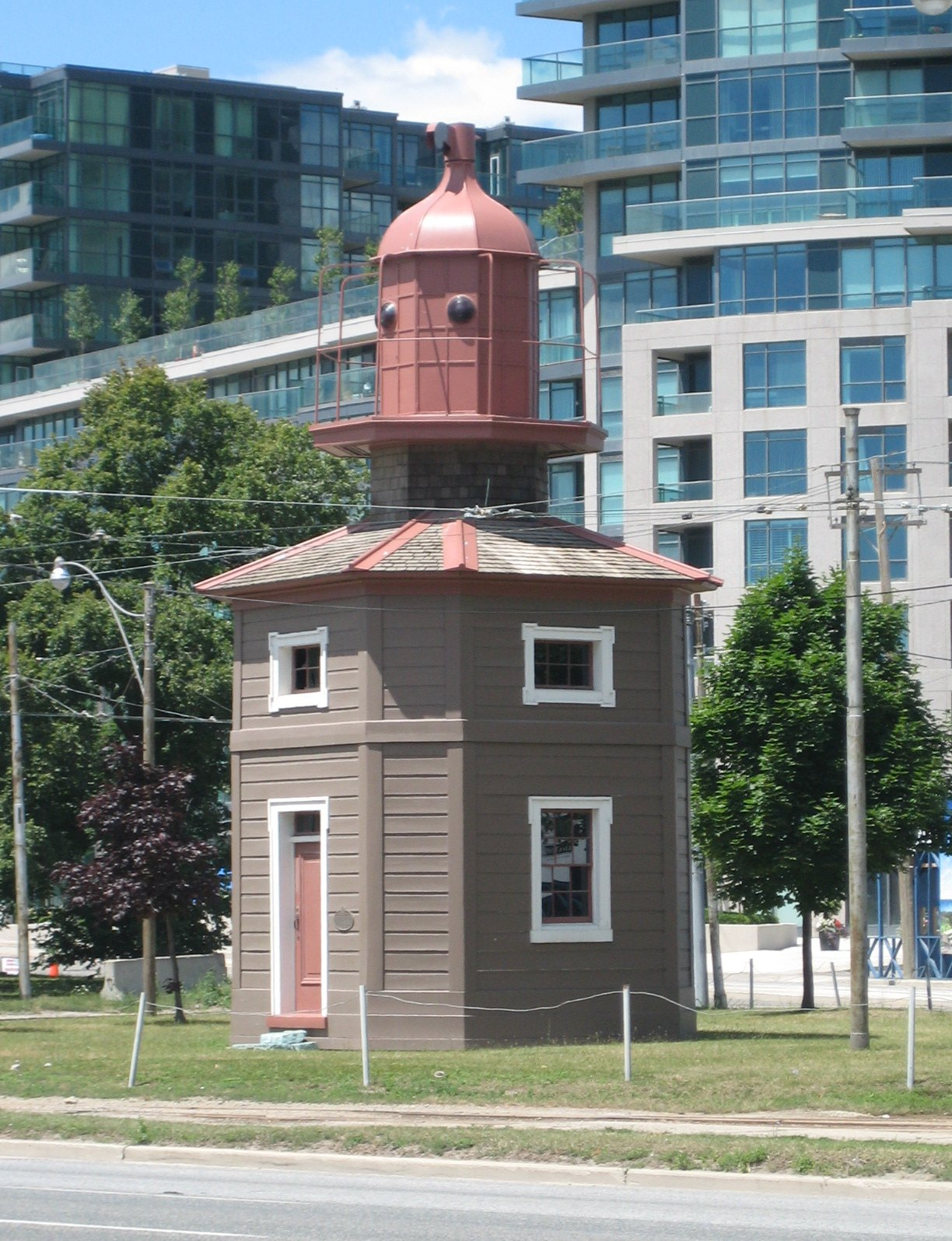
- The lighthouse at its Fleet Street location
- Location: Lakeshore Boulevard at Fleet Street; Toronto, Ontario, Canada
- Coordinates: 43°38′09.2″N 79°24′17.9″W

Tower
- Constructed: 1838 (first)
- Construction: wooden basement and tower
- Height: 8.5 metres (28 ft)
- Shape: octagonal prism tower rising from a basement
- Markings: brown tower, dark red lantern
- Operator: Toronto Transit Commission

Light
- First lit: 1861
- Deactivated: 1912

The Queen's Wharf Lighthouse (also known as the Fleet Street Lighthouse, after its current location) is a lighthouse in Toronto, Ontario, Canada, situated at Fleet Street just east of the Princes' Gates at Exhibition Place. The octagonal building was originally one of a pair of lighthouses built in 1861 at Queen's Wharf, replacing an earlier 16-foot lighthouse built in 1838. The 11-metre (36-foot) three-storey wood structure is one of two surviving 19th-century lighthouses in Toronto (the other being Gibraltar Point Lighthouse).

== History ==
The lighthouse, which projected a red light, was designed by the architect Kivas Tully, and along with a second, larger white light lighthouse, marked the entrance to the Toronto Harbour from 1861. The two lights were lined up to guide ships into Toronto Harbour, which had a narrow and shallow (14 feet (4.3 metres) deep) channel over bedrock and shallow sandbars. The building is a bare frame structure and was never meant to be used as a dwelling by a lighthouse keeper, who stayed in a nearby cottage. The harbour master's residence was also nearby.

The shifting in direction of the deep water channel to Toronto Harbour necessitated the moving of the red light lighthouse in 1885. Both lighthouses became redundant when a new western channel to the harbour was opened with a pair of new range lights (a short tower on concrete base and a taller skeletal tower) and were deactivated in 1912. The new range lights were destroyed by fire in 1918. By 1925, the Queen's Wharf Lighthouse was surrounded by new lands filling in the area around the Queen's Wharf, 1,400 feet (430 metres) from the water. The other lighthouse was demolished but the Toronto Harbour Commission moved the remaining lighthouse to its present Fleet Street location in 1929. The new location was on the northern approach to the old western channel. Its ownership was transferred to the City of Toronto.

The lighthouse currently sits at the eastern edge of the Gore park about one block north from the current shoreline and is contained within a small Toronto Transit Commission streetcar loop. The building was listed in the Toronto Heritage Register on June 20, 1973. The Historical Board of Toronto did some restoration of the lighthouse in 1988. The light is no longer functional.

== Fleet Loop ==
Fleet Loop
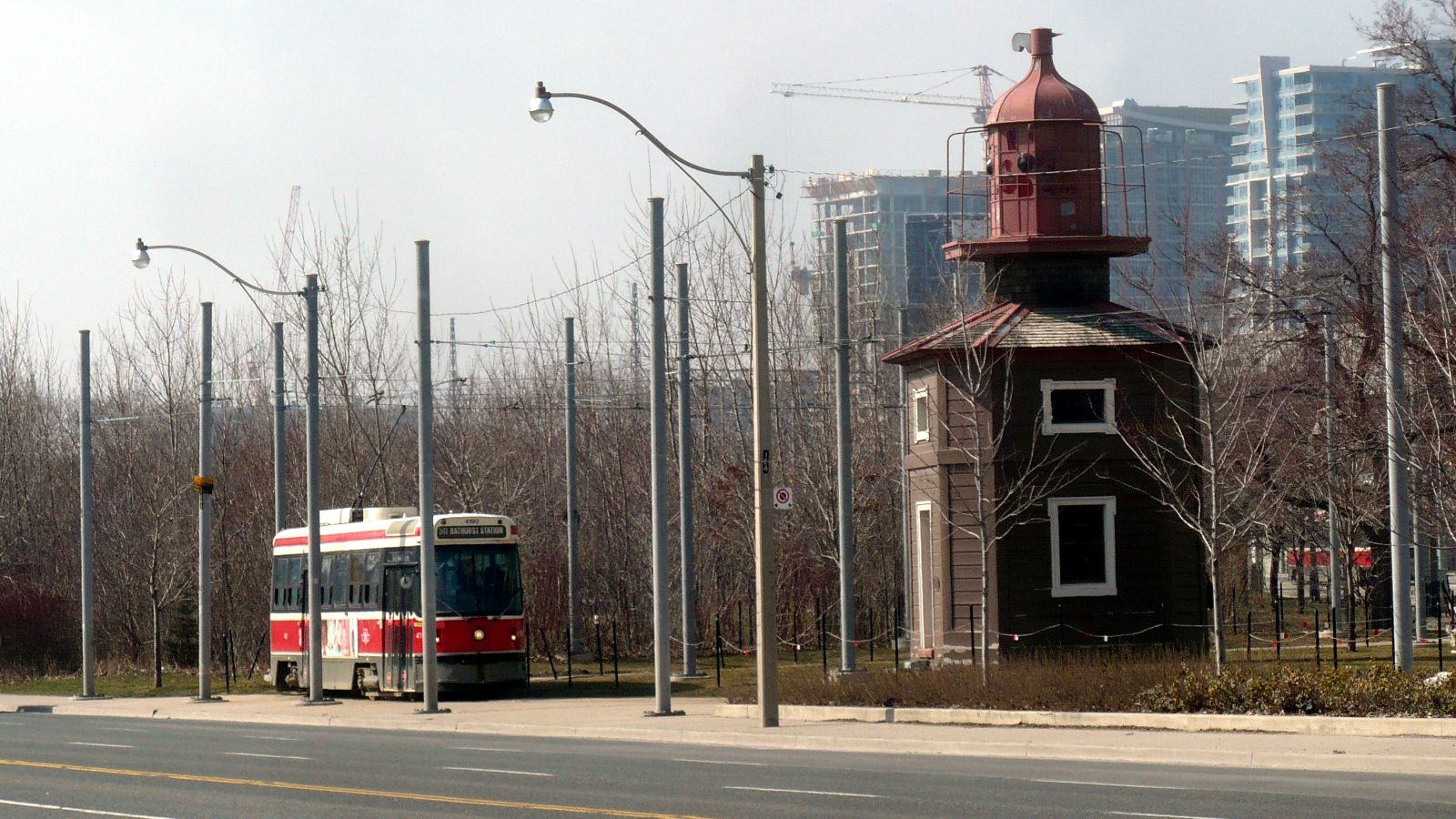

General information
- Operator: TTC

History
- Opened: 1931
- Rebuilt: 1982
Location

Fleet Loop is a turning loop, encircling the lighthouse, used for short turning the 509 Harbourfront and 511 Bathurst streetcar routes of the Toronto Transit Commission (TTC). The lands are leased from Exhibition Place on a renewable ten-year term.

When the loop first opened on June 22, 1931 it could only turn westbound streetcars back east. The loop was rebuilt in 1982 and reconfigured so that streetcars on Fleet Street could enter and exit in both directions, allowing them to return to the Exhibition Loop or loop-the-loop. Passengers cannot access vehicles here and must board streetcars at a stop just east of the loop.

== See also ==
- List of oldest buildings and structures in Toronto
- Fort York Neighbourhood
