= Fort York (neighbourhood) =

- Neighbourhood
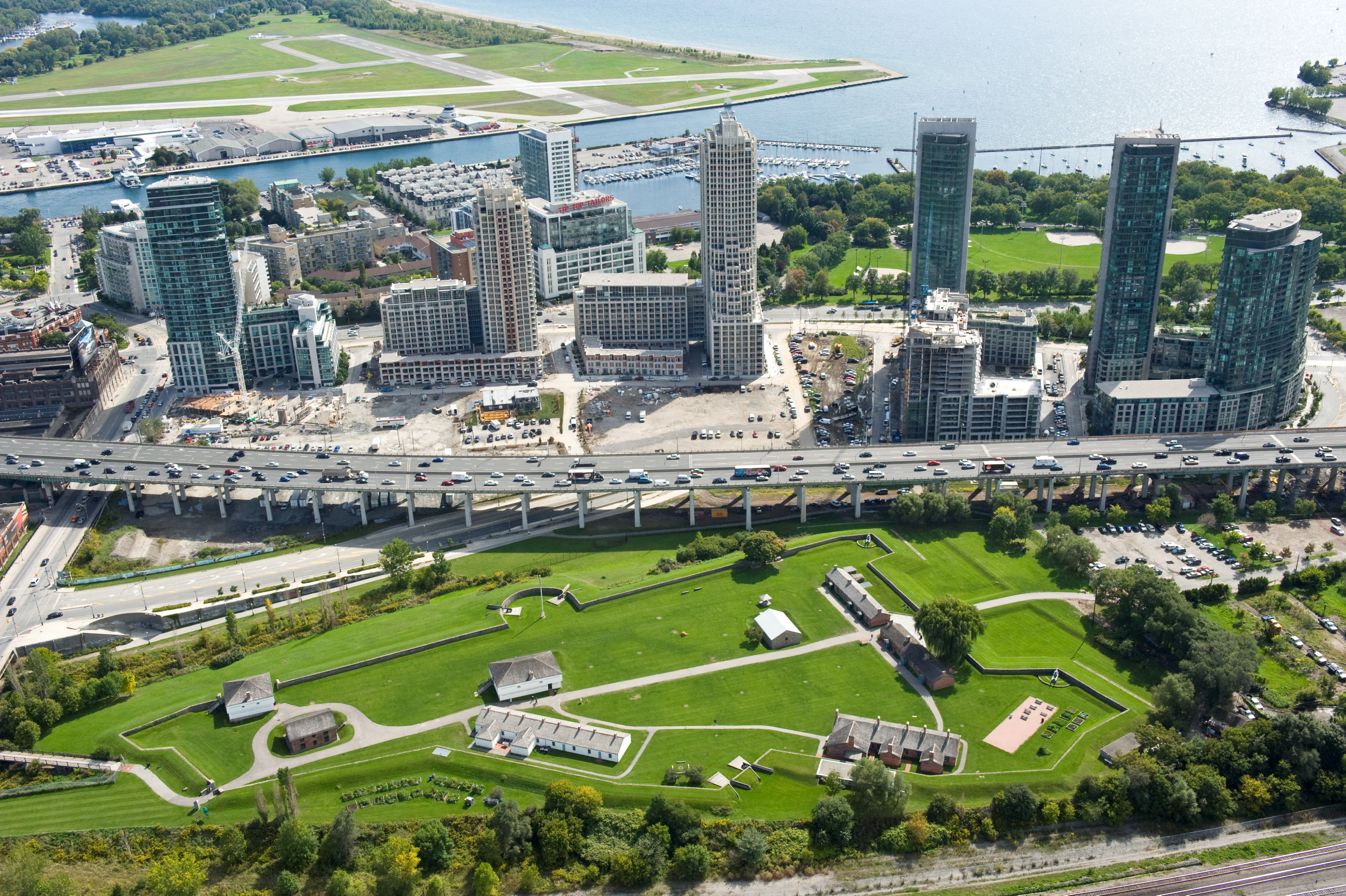
- Aerial view of Fort York

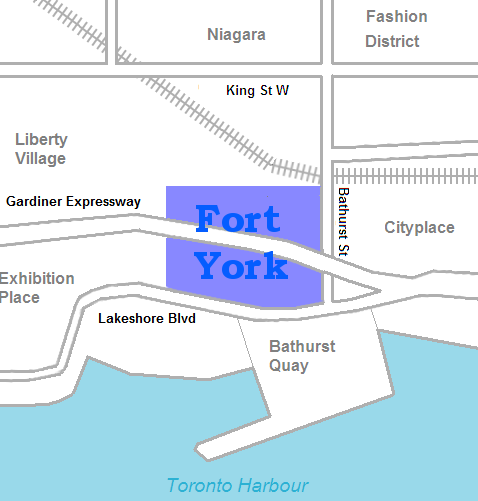
- Vicinity

- Location within Toronto
- Coordinates: 43.639°N 79.405°W
- Country: Canada
- Province: Ontario
- City: Toronto

Government
  - City Councillor: Ausma Malik (Ward 10 Spadina—Fort York)
  - Federal M.P.: Chi Nguyen (Spadina—Harbourfront)
  - Provincial M.P.P.: Chris Glover (Spadina—Fort York)

Fort York, also known as Garrison, is a neighbourhood in Toronto, Ontario, Canada, located west of Downtown Toronto, north of Billy Bishop Toronto City Airport, and east of Exhibition Place along the shores of Lake Ontario. While it is home to Fort York, a National Historic Site, it also contains several mid and high-rise condominium buildings built during the 21st century.

== History ==
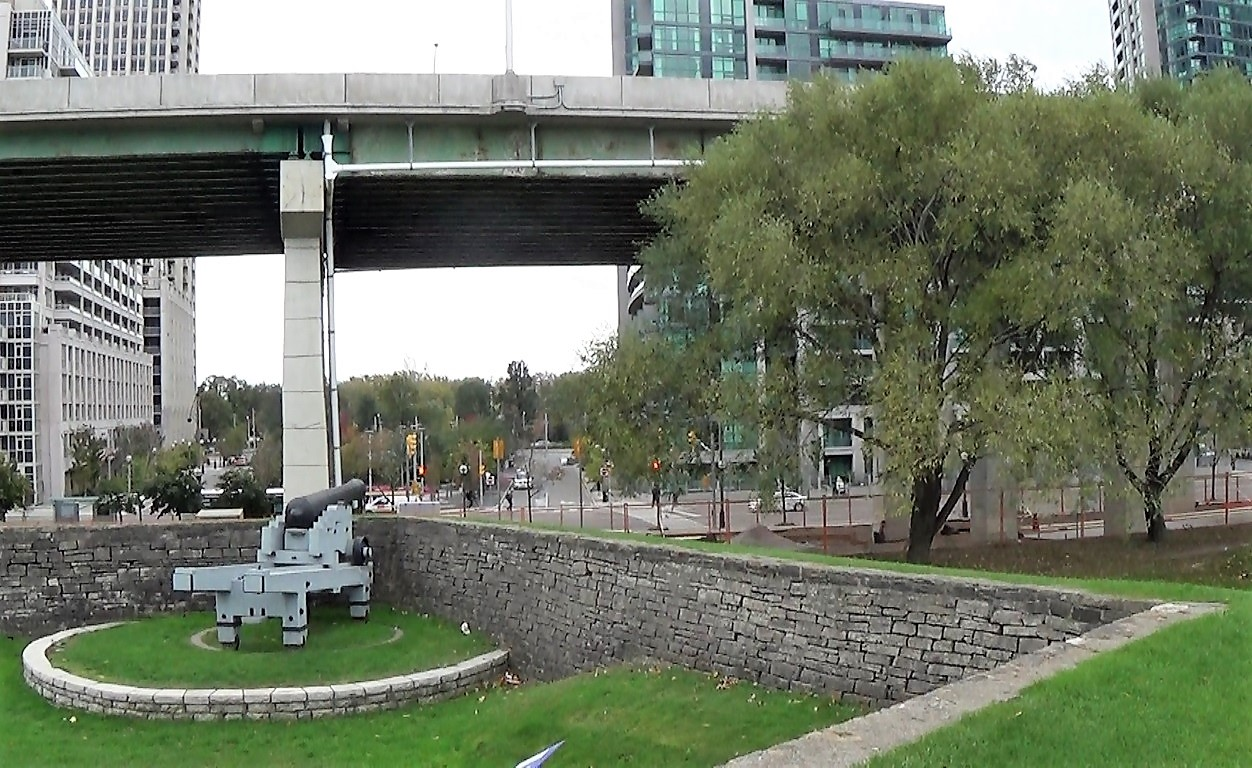
Fort York is situated near the city's original waterfront. The area that makes up Fort York neighbourhood was the result of land reclamation projects in the late-19th and early-20th century.

The neighbourhood area consists of the former industrial lands immediately east and south of Fort York, a fort since 1793, and designated a National Historic Site of Canada in 1923. The current Fort York Armoury was built in 1933, and still houses several units of the Canadian Forces. The neighbourhood is one of Toronto's most historically and cultural sensitive areas, and was the location of the lakeside Toronto Molson brewery before it was demolished in 2006.

The Fort York Neighbourhood Public Realm Plan is the next step in the planning and design for the Fort York Neighbourhood. The area's redevelopment plan was finalized in 2005, and establishes guidelines for an overall vision of the emerging neighbourhood. It set out the location of public spaces, density, height and built form so that the area's streetscapes, open spaces, parks and pedestrian areas are interconnected with private development.

=== Recent developments ===
A 38-storey residential tower and 7- to 12-storey podium building was constructed in 2005 at the west end of the neighbourhood, at the corner of Fleet Street Fort York Boulevard. This was the first element of the planned redevelopment of the site into a mixed-use community, including 12 residential towers, podium buildings and stacked townhouses, with grade-level retail and commercial uses. The neighbourhood will eventually house an estimated 6000 units within the area north of Lake Shore Boulevard, south of Fort York Boulevard between Strachan Avenue and Dan Leckie Way (an extension of Portland Street).

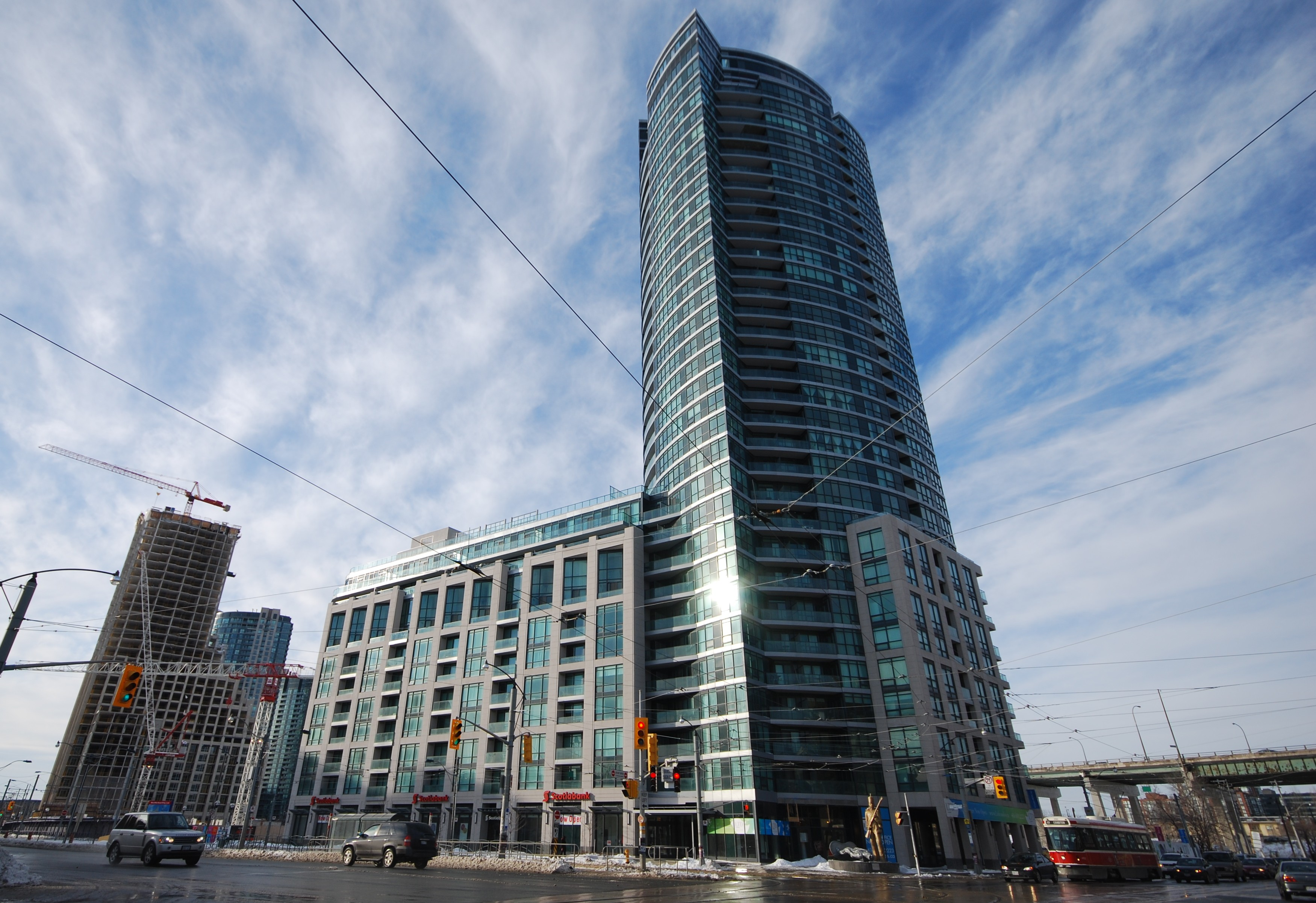
The Malibu, one of several condo developments in the area.

It has been the site of a lot of condominium loft and row house development. The area is located close to the Fashion and Entertainment districts. Significant high-rise development has taken place within the Fort York Neighbourhood, south of the Gardiner Expressway between Fort York Blvd. and Fleet Street.

Some of the main roads in the neighbourhood are:

- Bathurst Street
- Fleet Street
- Lake Shore Boulevard
- Fort York Boulevard
- Gardiner Expressway

The Bentway is an innovative public space that transforms 1.75 km underneath Toronto's Gardiner Expressway into a new gathering place for the city's growing population. The initial phase – from Strachan Avenue to Bathurst Street – knits together seven local neighbourhoods with over 70,000 residents, becoming a gateway to the waterfront, while providing access to key attractions and destinations including Fort York National Historic Site, Exhibition Place, Harbourfront Centre and the CN Tower. The Bentway offers year-round activities and events, including gardens, a skate trail, recreational amenities, public markets, public art, special exhibitions, festivals, and theatre and musical performances.

== Public transportation ==
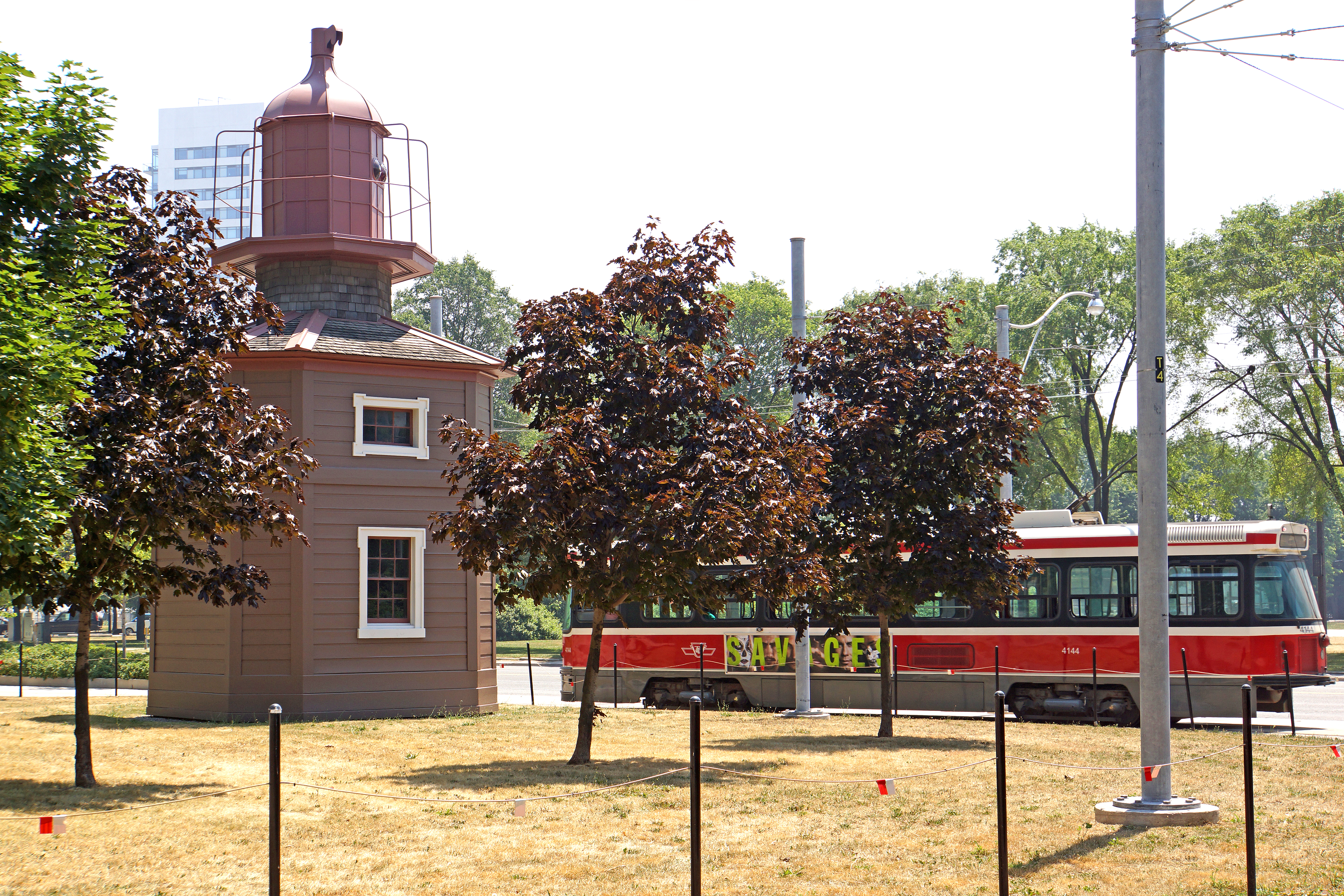
A streetcar passes by the Queen's Wharf Lighthouse. Fort York neighbourhood is served by 509 Harbourfront streetcar line.

The Harbourfront is served by the 509 Harbourfront streetcar, which operates between Union and Exhibition Place running along a private right-of-way (ROW) on Queens Quay west to Bathurst and then along Fleet Street. Between September 2007 and March 2008, the Fleet Street portion of Route 509 was converted to a ROW. Streetcar track and overhead power line were also installed at the Fleet loop, which is located at the Fleet Street Lighthouse.

== Queen's Wharf ==
A wharf was located south of the fort that was reached via Bathurst Street in the 19th century located near the mouth of Garrison Creek. It first appeared in the 1830s and rebuilt 8 times before it was filled in by 1917. The wharf was named for Queen Victoria and now site of condo towers near the corner of Bathurst Street and Fleet Street. The Fleet Street Lighthouse or Queen's Wharf Lighthouse was once located at this wharf.

== See also ==
- Fort York
- Fort York Armoury
