= Bagotville (tugboat) =

Canadian tugboat

- Bagotville assisting the George M. Carl in 1975

History

Canada
- Name: Bagotville
- Owner: McNally Construction
- Builder: Verrault Navigation, Les Méchins
- Launched: 1964
- Home port: Toronto (1974–present)
- Identification: Official number 322312

General characteristics
- Class & type: Tugboat
- Tonnage: 65.20 tons
- Length: 18.38 m (60 ft 4 in)
- Beam: 5.64 m (18 ft 6 in)
- Draft: 2.53 m (8 ft 4 in)
- Installed power: 850 bhp (630 kW)
- Propulsion: Diesel
- Speed: 10 knots (19 km/h; 12 mph)

Bagotville is a tugboat built in Les Méchins, Quebec in 1964.

The Bagotville was one of the tugs that helped install the pipes for Toronto's deep lake water cooling project. She was also one of the tugs that attempted to free the lake freighter George M. Carl, when ship ran aground off the Humber River, in October 1975.
