= G.W. Rogers =

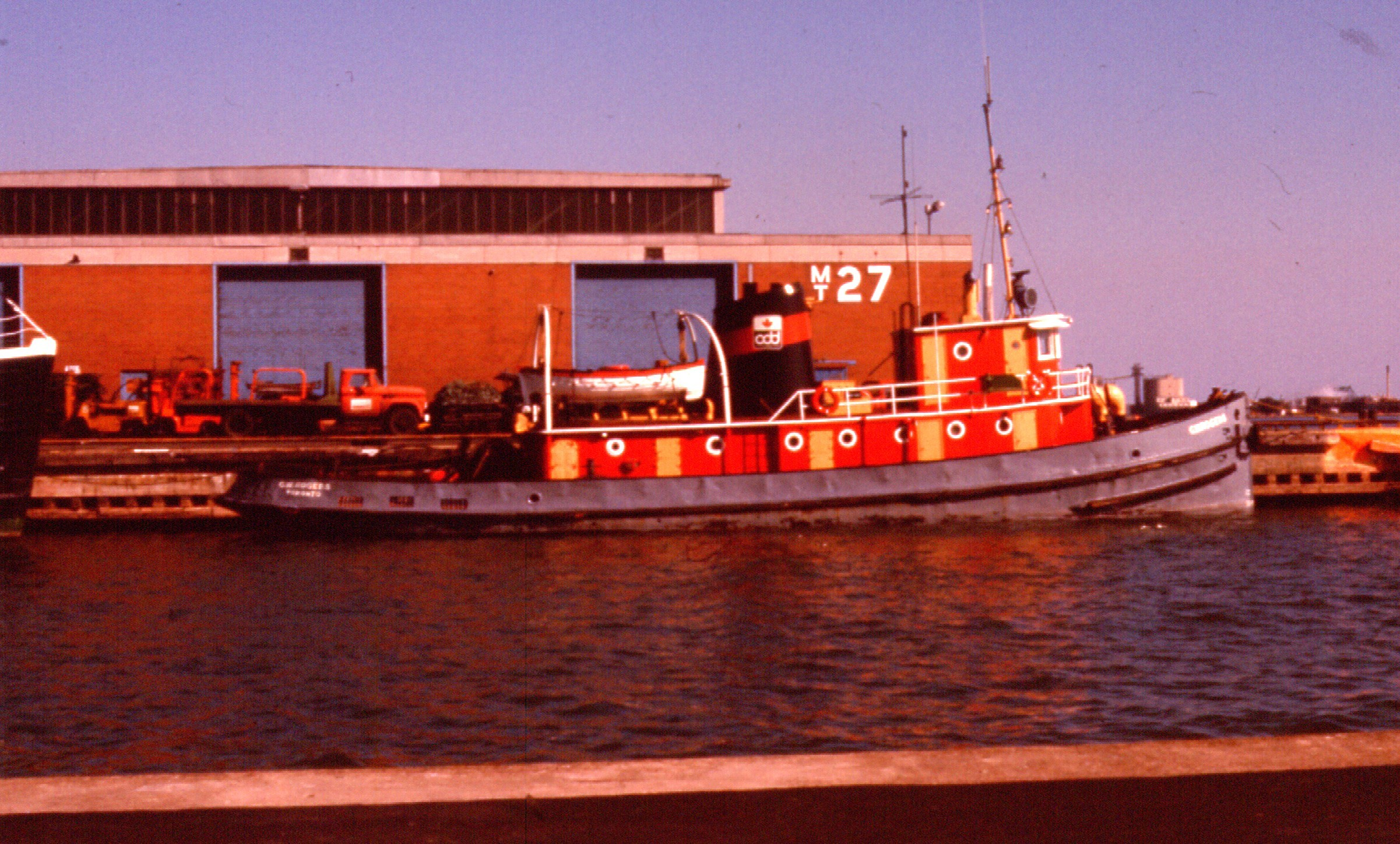
- Tugboat G.W. Rogers moored in Toronto in 1976.

History

Canada
- Name: G.W. Rogers
- Owner: Canadian Dredging Company
- Builder: Great Yarmouth, England
- Launched: 1919
- Out of service: December 1987
- Homeport: Midland, Ontario
- Identification: IMO number: 5125037; Official number: 143212 (Canada)
- Fate: Sank at her moorings, December 1987

General characteristics
- Class & type: Steam Tug
- Tonnage: 164 GT
- Length: 88 ft 5 in (26.95 m)
- Beam: 21 ft 2 in (6.45 m)
- Draft: 10 ft 6 in (3.20 m)
- Installed power: 35 hp (26 kW)

G.W. Rogers was a tugboat active on the Great Lakes.

She was built in 1919, at Great Yarmouth, in the United Kingdom. Her previous names included: Ballen Balloch, West Hope and Ocean Gull.

She helped free the lake freighter George M. Carl, when she ran aground off the mouth of the Humber River, in 1975.

The G.W. Rogers sank at her moorings at Rensselaer, New York in December 1987. A port official told the Schenectady Gazette that the vessel was so rusty her name was "nearly illegible". The Schenectady Gazette reported that a floating crane would have to be brought from New York City to salvage the tug, as the combined weight of the vessel and a land-based crane would overwhelm the moorings.
