= Ongiara (disambiguation) =

Ongiara may refer to:

- Ongiara an album by the band the Great Lake Swimmers
- Ongiara (1964), a passenger/vehicle ferry operated by the City of Toronto
- Ongiara (1885), a steam ferry that served most of her life on the Niagara River
