= Toronto Drydock Company =

Canadian shipbuilding repair company

Toronto Drydock Company is a shipbuilding repair company in Canada and the name of two shipbuilders in the 19th and 20th centuries respectively.

== Toronto Dry Dock Company ==
The first Toronto Dry Dock Company was established in 1847 by William Botsford Jarvis (1799–1864) in the Province of Canada to build ships to ply the waters of the Great Lakes.

== Toronto Dry Dock Company Limited ==
Another Toronto Dry Dock Company Limited was established in 1917 by several partners:

- C. S. Boone – President of the C. S. Boone Dredging and Construction Company Limited
- John E. Russell,
- Lawrence Solman, manager of the Toronto Ferry Company Limited
- John J. Manley, C. S. Boone Dredging and Construction Company Limited
- Henry J. Dixon

Toronto Dry Dock and its floating dry dock and yard were located along the south edge of Keating Channel, along with the related Toronto Ship Building Company, owned by the same principals. The company acquired the shipbuilding business of Patrick Dixon and son Harry J. Dixon) under the Ontario Companies Act to build larger ships, and during WW I Toronto Shipbuilding constructed two wood-hulled freighters in 1918, the War Ontario and War Toronto, side-launching both into Keating Channel. The company remained in business until 1964 and was later acquired as part of the Port Weller Dry Docks.

The facilities were sold following the bankruptcy of Port Weller Dry Docks Limited, who moved the dry dock to Port Weller, Ontario and sold the facilities to Toronto Harbour Commission. The former dockyard is now used for storage by Harbourfront Centre and Port of Toronto (to store the airport ferries).

== Toronto Drydock ==
The current Toronto Drydock, founded in 1989 is a small marine repair facility built from the former St-Lawrence pulpwood carrier Menier Consol (built in 1962 and converted as floating drydock after 1984) and located in the eastern Portland area in the Turning Basin along Basin Street and across from the former Hearn Generating Station.

== History of shipbuilding in Toronto ==
Shipbuilding in Toronto dates back to the period when shipping was isolated to the Great Lakes. Early ship building was conducted by the Royal Navy for use in the Great Lakes, but several small, medium, and large private shipbuilding concerns developed during the 19th and early 20th centuries.

Polson Iron Works, established in Toronto in 1883, was a major builder of steamers into the 1900s. Located at the foot of Sherbourne Street, the Iron Works produced around 150 assorted vessels, including ten steel-hulled minesweepers for the Royal Canadian Navy and Royal Navy, and six cargo vessels during World War I. After the war Polson declared bankruptcy and closed in 1919 due to lack orders and tariff protections.

A succession of ship builders were also located at Bathurst Street Wharf, starting with John Doty Engine Works (1875–1892). The yard was purchased by Bertram Engine Works (1893–1905), then by Canadian Shipbuilding Company (1905–1907); and then by Toronto Shipyards (1908–1910). The idled yard was later taken over by Thor Iron Works (1913–1917), which constructed two minesweepers for the Royal Navy and four cargo vessels before selling the yard to Dominion Shipbuilding. Dominion then built a new facility on reclaimed land leased from the Toronto Harbour Commission and constructed twelve merchant ships during and immediately following the war (1917–1921) before ceasing operations. The once again idle ship yard was reactivated during World War II by the Canadian Government to construct Bangor and Algerine-class minesweepers (1941–1945), with the yard operated by a succession of companies, starting with Dufferin Shipbuilding Company Limited, then government-owned Toronto Shipbuilding Company Limited, and finally Redfern Construction Company Limited. At the end of the war the yard was closed for good.

A number of other small builders dotted the waterfront east and west of Toronto proper:

- Rouge River
- Highland Creek – Thomas Adams
- Humber River
- Credit River

The Rouge River's ship building was linked to the prolific lumber industry. The shipbuilding industry ranged between 1810 and 1856.

Most of the ships were used for passenger and to carry potash, grain and lumber between Oswego, New York and Toronto, then called York.

A partial list of notable ships built in Toronto
Vessel	Type	Hull	Year launched	Year retired	Builder
name unknown	wood sailing ship		c. 1812		Thomas Adams Port Union near Highland Creek
Duke of York	wood schooner		1820		Capt. Hadley
Mary Ann	wood sailing ship		1834		Thomas Adams Port Union at mouth of Highland Creek
City of Toronto	wood ship		1855		built for Allan Lines
Knapp's Roller Boat	prototype		1887		Polson Iron Works Limited
City of Chatham	passenger	20	1888		Polson Iron Works Limited
Mayflower	ferry		1890		by John Doty & Sons
Primrose	ferry		1890		John Doty & Sons
Corona	passenger	16	1896		Bertram Engineering Works Company
Toronto	passenger	29	1899		Bertram Engineering Works Company
Ottawa	cargo	35	1900		Bertram Engineering Works Company
Kingston	passenger	37	1901		Bertram Engineering Works Company
Tadenac	cargo	36	1902		Bertram Engineering Works Company
Tadousac	cargo	40	1903		Bertram Engineering Works Company
Lurcher	light ship	63	1903		Polson Iron Works Limited
Anticosti	light ship	63	1904		Polson Iron Works Limited
Montreal	passenger	38	1904		Bertram Engineering Works Company
Haddington	cargo	43	1904		Bertram Engineering Works Company
Vigilant	fisheries patrol	70	1904		Polson Iron Works Limited
Bluebell	ferry		1906		Polson Iron Works Limited
Cayuga	passenger	100	1907		Canadian Shipbuilding Company
E. B. Osler	laker	101	1907		Canadian Shipbuilding Company
Rapids King	passenger	106	1907		Canadian Shipbuilding Company
Ontario No. 1	railcar ferry		1907		Canadian Shipbuilding Company
Trillium	ferry	94	1910		Polson Iron Works Limited
Rapids Prince	passenger	113	1910		Toronto Shipyards Ltd
Kwasind	RCYC passenger ferry	105	1913		Polson Iron Works Limited
HMCS Festubert	minesweeper	135	1917		Polson Iron Works Limited
HMCS Ypres	minesweeper	136	1917		Polson Iron Works Limited
HMCS Messines	minesweeper	137	1917		Polson Iron Works Limited
HMCS St. Eloi	minesweeper	138	1917		Polson Iron Works Limited
HMCS St. Julien	minesweeper	139	1917		Polson Iron Works Limited
HMCS Vimy	minesweeper	140	1917		Polson Iron Works Limited
HMCS TR-15	minesweeper	141	1918		Polson Iron Works Limited
HMCS TR-16	minesweeper	142	1918		Polson Iron Works Limited
HMCS TR-17	minesweeper	143	1918		Polson Iron Works Limited
HMCS TR-18	minesweeper	144	1918		Polson Iron Works Limited
Tento	cargo	133	1918		Polson Iron Works Limited
Asp	cargo	134	1918		Polson Iron Works Limited
War Ontario	cargo	1	1918		Toronto Drydock Company / Toronto Shipbuilding
War Toronto	cargo	2	1918		Toronto Drydock Company / Toronto Shipbuilding
Angoulème	cargo	4	1918		Thor Iron Works / Dominion Shipbuilding
Troja	cargo	5	1918		Thor Iron Works / Dominion Shipbuilding
HMCS TR-13	minesweeper	6	1918		Thor Iron Works / Dominion Shipbuilding
HMCS TR-14	minesweeper	7	1918		Thor Iron Works / Dominion Shipbuilding
St. Mihiel	cargo	8	1918		Thor Iron Works / Dominion Shipbuilding
Le Quesnoy	cargo	9	1919		Thor Iron Works / Dominion Shipbuilding
War Hydra	cargo	145	1919		Polson Iron Works Limited
War Taurus	cargo	146	1919		Polson Iron Works Limited
War Timiskaming	cargo	147	1919		Polson Iron Works Limited
Aquila/War Hamilton	cargo	148	1919		Polson Iron Works Limited
War Algoma	cargo	149	1919		Polson Iron Works Limited
War Halton	cargo	150	1919		Polson Iron Works Limited
General Currie	cargo	1	1919		Dominion Shipbuilding Limited
General Morrison	cargo	2	1919		Dominion Shipbuilding Limited
General Turner	cargo	3	1919		Dominion Shipbuilding Limited
General Williams	cargo	4	1919		Dominion Shipbuilding Limited
Hessa	cargo	5	1919		Dominion Shipbuilding Limited
Skolma	cargo	6	1919		Dominion Shipbuilding Limited
Torontonian	cargo	7	1920		Dominion Shipbuilding Limited
T. L. Church	cargo	8	1920		Dominion Shipbuilding Limited
Canadian Pathfinder	cargo	10	1920		Dominion Shipbuilding Limited
Canadian Engineer	cargo	11	1920		Dominion Shipbuilding Limited
Gonzaba/Washington	cargo	14	1920		Dominion Shipbuilding Limited
Floraba/Bolivar	cargo	15	1920		Dominion Shipbuilding Limited
Ned Hanlon	tug		1932		Toronto Drydock Company
William Inglis	ferry		1935		Toronto Drydock Company
Sam McBride	ferry	6	1939		Toronto Drydock Company
HMCS Nipigon (J154)	minesweeper	15	1941		Dufferin Shipbuilding / Toronto Shipbuilding
HMCS Burlington (J250)	minesweeper	16	1941		Dufferin Shipbuilding / Toronto Shipbuilding
HMCS Georgian (J144)	minesweeper	17	1941		Dufferin Shipbuilding / Toronto Shipbuilding
HMCS Thunder (J146)	minesweeper	18	1941		Dufferin Shipbuilding / Toronto Shipbuilding
HMCS Gananoque (J259)	minesweeper	19	1941		Dufferin Shipbuilding / Toronto Shipbuilding
HMCS Goderich (J260)	minesweeper	20	1941		Dufferin Shipbuilding / Toronto Shipbuilding
HMS Fort York (J119)	minesweeper	21	1942		Dufferin Shipbuilding / Toronto Shipbuilding
HMS Parrsborough (J117)	minesweeper	22	1942		Dufferin Shipbuilding / Toronto Shipbuilding
HMS Qualicum (J138)	minesweeper	23	1942		Dufferin Shipbuilding / Toronto Shipbuilding
HMS Shippigan (J212)	minesweeper	24	1942		Dufferin Shipbuilding / Toronto Shipbuilding
HMS Tadoussac (J220)	minesweeper	25	1942		Dufferin Shipbuilding / Toronto Shipbuilding
HMS Wedgeport (J139)	minesweeper	26	1942		Dufferin Shipbuilding / Toronto Shipbuilding
HMS Antares (J282)	minesweeper	31	1943		Redfern Construction Company Limited
HMS Arcturus (J283)	minesweeper	32	1943		Redfern Construction Company Limited
HMS Aries (J284)	minesweeper	33	1943		Redfern Construction Company Limited
HMS Clinton (J286)	minesweeper	34	1943		Redfern Construction Company Limited
HMS Friendship (J398)	minesweeper	35	1943		Redfern Construction Company Limited
HMS Gozo (J287)	minesweeper	36	1943		Redfern Construction Company Limited
HMS Lightfoot (J288)	minesweeper	37	1943		Redfern Construction Company Limited
HMS Melita (J289)	minesweeper	38	1943		Redfern Construction Company Limited
HMS Octavia (J290)	minesweeper	39	1943		Redfern Construction Company Limited
HMS Persian (J347)	minesweeper	40	1943		Redfern Construction Company Limited
HMS Postillion (J297)	minesweeper	41	1943		Redfern Construction Company Limited
HMS Skipjack (J300)	minesweeper	42	1944		Redfern Construction Company Limited
HMS Thisbe (J302)	minesweeper	43	1944		Redfern Construction Company Limited
HMS Truelove (J303)	minesweeper	44	1944		Redfern Construction Company Limited
HMS Welfare (J356)	minesweeper	45	1944		Redfern Construction Company Limited
HMS Mary Rose (J360)	minesweeper	46	1944		Redfern Construction Company Limited
HMS Moon (J329)	minesweeper	47	1944		Redfern Construction Company Limited
HMS Providence (J325)	minesweeper	48	1944		Redfern Construction Company Limited
HMS Regulus (J327)	minesweeper	49	1944		Redfern Construction Company Limited
HMS Seabear (J333)	minesweeper	50	1944		Redfern Construction Company Limited
HMS Serene (J354)	minesweeper	51	1944		Redfern Construction Company Limited
HMS Coquette (J350)	minesweeper	52	1944		Redfern Construction Company Limited
HMS Courier (J349)	minesweeper	53	1944		Redfern Construction Company Limited
HMS Felicity (J369)	minesweeper	54	1944		Redfern Construction Company Limited
HMS Flying Fish (J370)	minesweeper	55	1944		Redfern Construction Company Limited
HMS Golden Fleece (J376)	minesweeper	56	1944		Redfern Construction Company Limited
HMS Lioness (J377)	minesweeper	57	1944		Redfern Construction Company Limited
HMS Prompt (J378)	minesweeper	58	1944		Redfern Construction Company Limited
HMS Jaseur (J428)	minesweeper	59	1944		Redfern Construction Company Limited
HMS Laertes (J433)	minesweeper	60	1944		Redfern Construction Company Limited
HMS Maenad (J335)	minesweeper	61	1944		Redfern Construction Company Limited
HMS Magicienne (J436)	minesweeper	62	1945		Redfern Construction Company Limited
HMS Mameluke (J437)	minesweeper	63	1945		Redfern Construction Company Limited
HMS Mandate (J438)	minesweeper	64	1945		Redfern Construction Company Limited
HMS Marvel (J443)	minesweeper	65	1945		Redfern Construction Company Limited
HMS Michael (J444)	minesweeper	66	1945		Redfern Construction Company Limited
HMS Minstrel (J445)	minesweeper	67	1945		Redfern Construction Company Limited
HMS Myrmidon (J454)	minesweeper	68	1945		Redfern Construction Company Limited
HMS Mystic (J455)	minesweeper	69	1945		Redfern Construction Company Limited
HMS Nerissa (J456)	minesweeper	70	1945		Redfern Construction Company Limited
Thomas Rennie	ferry	8	1951		Toronto Drydock Company

== See also ==
- Bathurst Street Wharf
