= Thomas Rennie (ferry) =

Ferry

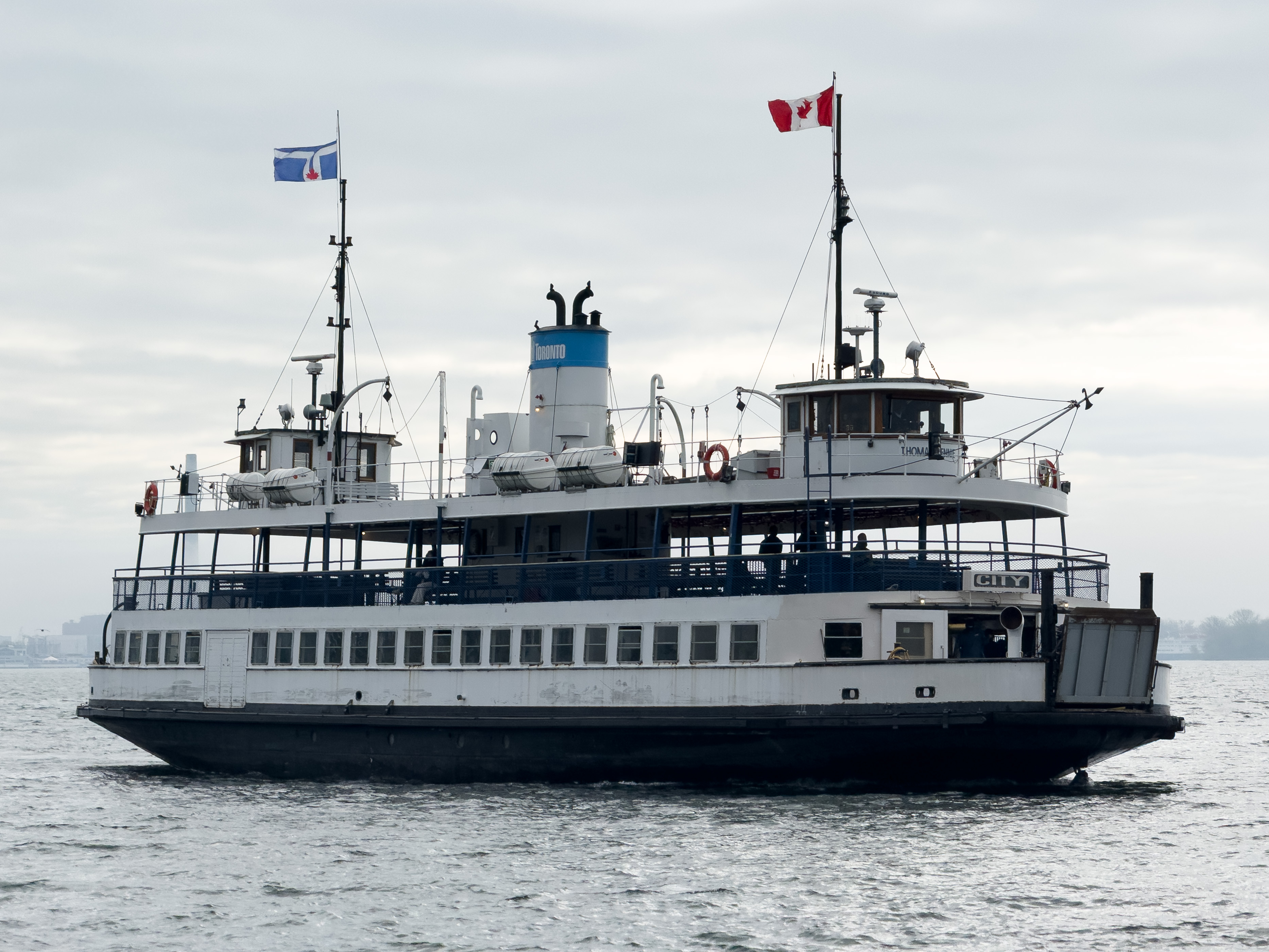
- Thomas Rennie in 2025

History
- Name: Thomas Rennie
- Namesake: Thomas Rennie
- Owner: City of Toronto
- Operator: Toronto Parks, Forestry and Recreation Division
- Port of registry: (Canada) Toronto
- Builder: Toronto Drydock Co. Ltd., Toronto
- Cost: CA$250,000
- In service: 1951

General characteristics
- Type: Ferry
- Tonnage: 424 GT; 274 NT
- Length: 39 m (129 ft)
- Beam: 10.08 m (33 ft 1 in)
- Draught: 1.82 m (6 ft 0 in)
- Depth: 2.71 m (8 ft 11 in)
- Decks: 2
- Installed power: 900 bhp (670 kW)
- Propulsion: 2 × Caterpillar D353 diesel engines
- Speed: 10.3 knots (19.1 km/h; 11.9 mph)
- Capacity: 901 passengers

Thomas Rennie is a Toronto Island ferry operated by the Parks, Forestry and Recreation Division of the City of Toronto government. She entered service in 1951, the most recent of the three ferries that bring visitors to the Toronto Islands during the summer months. She was named after a former member of the Toronto Harbour Commission.

== History ==
Entering service in 1950, Thomas Rennie was built by the Toronto Dry Dock Company Limited. The ferry cost CA$250,000. It was built to replace T. J. Clark, which was then transferred from passenger service to freight service. She was designed to carry 980 passengers.

In 1953, Thomas Rennie ran aground at Hanlan's Point in fog. In July 1954, the vessel crashed into the city wharf when it failed to reverse, injuring two passengers. In 1958, when water levels were low, Thomas Rennie ran aground at Centre Island. A police launch was able to pull Thomas Rennie free.

In 1959, while a maintenance worker tested its engines, Thomas Rennie moved slowly out of its Queen's Quay dock, unpiloted. She went out 91 metres (100 yd) into the harbour, and made a slow arc to the west, crashing into the wharf at the Terminal Warehouse. The boat's controls had been left in the 'dead slow ahead' position. The ship suffered minor hull damage and was repaired by Toronto Dry Dock.

In 1965, Thomas Rennie had a stack fire when its engines overheated. The fireboat William Lyon Mackenzie was able to douse the flames while Toronto Harbour Police evacuated the passengers. In 1968, Thomas Rennie crashed into Queen's Quay ferry dock when it failed to reverse its engines. Eight children and four adults were taken to hospital with non-life-threatening injuries. The collision damaged the dock but the ferry was not damaged.

In 1976, while on a party cruise, a 21-year-old male passenger fell from Thomas Rennie into the harbour. The man spent several minutes in the water clinging to a ring buoy until Harbour Police arrived. He was treated for shock.

In 2007, Transport Canada published new passenger vessel regulations regarding damage stability (TP10943) requiring various upgrades to be implemented within prescribed compliance schedules. Thomas Rennie and her sister ship Sam McBride, and William Inglis were also modernized under a life extension program while a fleet renewal process was undertaken. A series of technical submissions to Transport Canada from the city's naval architectural engineering consultants took place through 2016. These technical submissions supported Transport Canada's risk assessments that considered the ferry's operations and environmental limits. Ultimately, Transport Canada approved Thomas Rennie and Sam McBride to be able to carry a total passenger complement of 915. In October 2012, Toronto City Council decided that funds should be set aside to replace Thomas Rennie and her two fleetmates with new vessels. Replacement costs were estimated at CA$8 million per ferry.

In April 2024, Thomas Rennie strayed off course in dense fog near Hanlan's Point and ran aground in the marine exclusion zone (MEZ) at Billy Bishop Airport. The MEZ exists to prevent airplanes operating at the airport from colliding with tall ships such as the three-storey ferry. No passengers or crew were injured. In May 2024, the ferry was taken to dry dock to repair the rudder. She returned to service for the Canada Day long weekend that same year.

== See also ==
- Ongiara
- PS Trillium
- Sam McBride
