= SS War Toronto =

Canadian ship

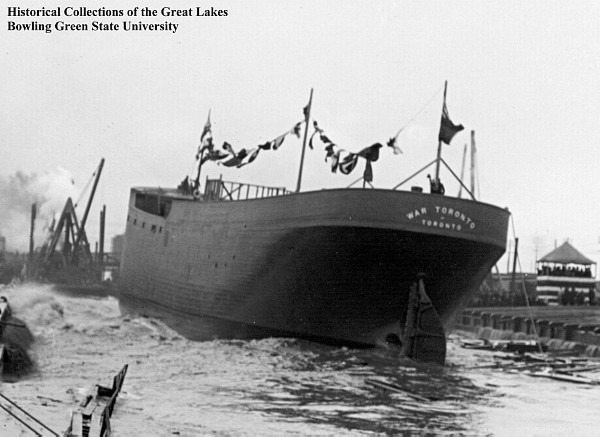
- Launching in 1918

History
- Name: War Toronto
- Owner: Shipping Controller
- Operator: Hansen Brothers & Company, Ltd, Cardiff
- Builder: Toronto Dry Dock & Ship Building Co. Ltd., Toronto
- Yard number: 2
- Launched: 26 October 1918
- Out of service: 19 November 1919
- Identification: Official number 143388
- Fate: Burnt on 20 November 1919

General characteristics
- Tonnage: 2,328 GRT
- Length: 261 feet (80 m)
- Beam: 43.5 feet (13.3 m)
- Draught: 19.6 feet (6.0 m)
- Installed power: 1,000 horsepower (750 kW) steam engine (manufactured at Canadian Bridge Company Limited, Walkerville, Ontario)
- Propulsion: triple expansion engine, single shaft, 1 screw
- Speed: 11 knots

SS War Toronto was a small freighter built in Toronto, in 1918, by Toronto Dry Dock & Ship Building Company Limited. She was one of 72 cargo vessels built under the authority of Canada's Imperial Munitions Board for wartime service in the First World War, and one of the 46 vessels with hulls built of wood. She had a carrying capacity of 2,500 deadweight tons. Toronto Shipbuilding also constructed a sister wood-hull ship at the same time, the SS War Ontario.

The Montreal Gazette profiled the War Toronto on her first visit to Montreal, on 13 April 1919. They described her as the last of 46 vessels built by order for the Imperial Munitions Board. On her voyage across the Atlantic to her owners, she carried lumber to Cardiff, Wales. She was delivered to the Shipping Controller on 23 April 1919, who assigned her to be managed by Hansen Brothers & Company, Ltd. She was employed carrying coal in civilian service. She ran aground off Agger, Jutland, on 19 September 1919 while on a voyage from the River Tyne to Sweden. Refloated, she was towed to Thisted for repairs, but was destroyed in a fire, while undergoing repairs on 20 November 1919.
