= Toronto Island ferries =

Canadian ferries

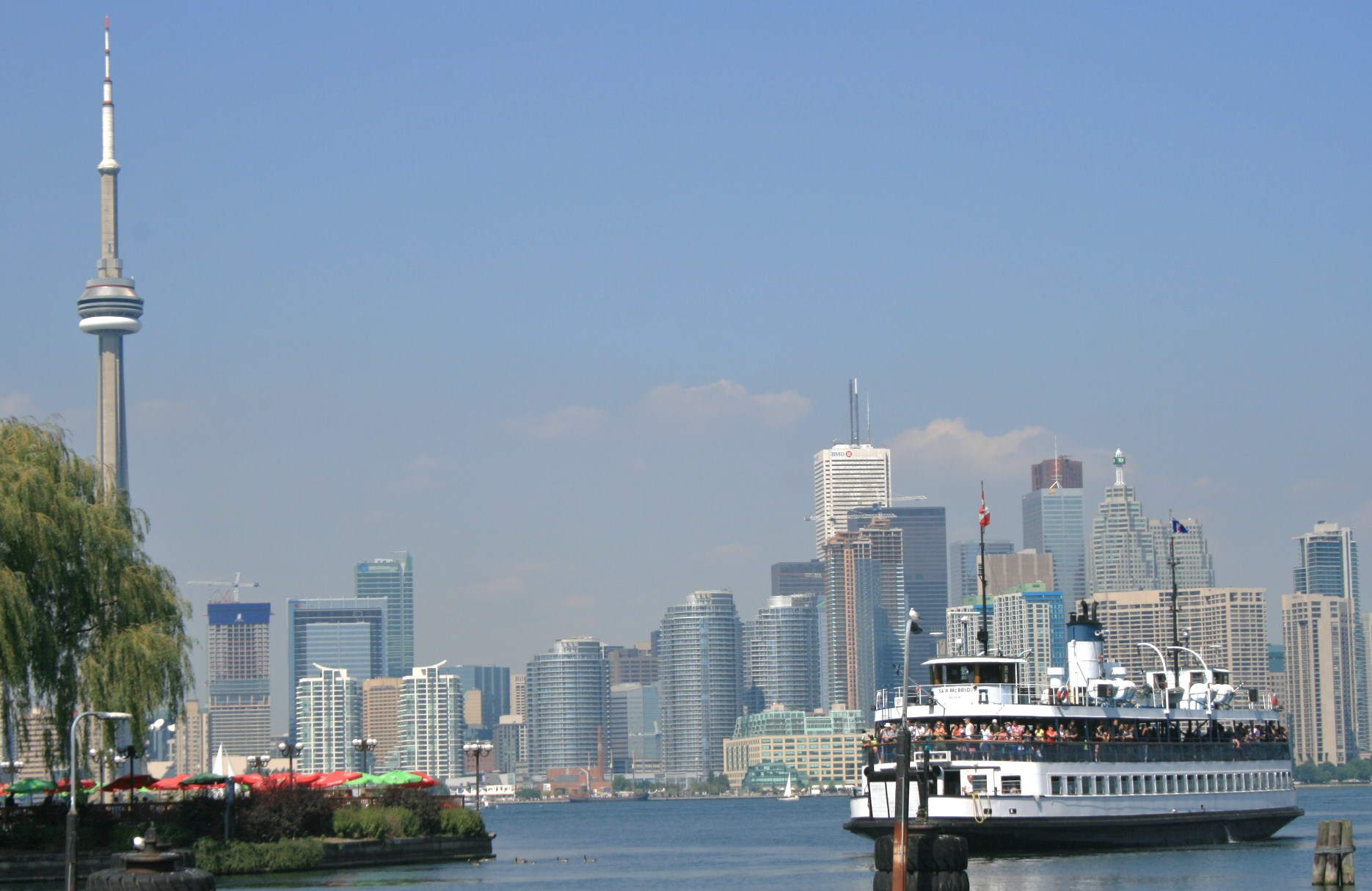
- A ferry preparing to dock at the Toronto Islands
- Locale: Toronto, Ontario, Canada
- Waterway: Toronto Inner Harbour (Lake Ontario)
- Transit type: Ferry
- Operator: Toronto Parks, Forestry and Recreation Division; Toronto Port Authority
- Began operation: 1883
- System length: City Docks to Centre - 2km City Docks to Hanlan's - 2km City Docks to Ward's - 1.7 km Western Gap - 190m
- No. of lines: 4
- No. of vessels: 8
- No. of terminals: 6
- Daily ridership: 18,000

The Toronto Island ferries connect the Toronto Islands in Lake Ontario to the mainland of Toronto, Ontario, Canada. The main city-operated ferry services carry passengers (all) and commercial vehicles (some) from the Jack Layton Ferry Terminal at the foot of Bay Street to three docks on the islands. Private motor vehicles are not carried. The ferry operated by PortsToronto carries passengers and vehicles to Billy Bishop Toronto City Airport on the island from the foot of Eireann Quay. Additional private ferries carry passengers to various island boat clubs. Ferry services to the islands began in 1833, and the Toronto Island Ferry Company began in 1883.

== Services ==
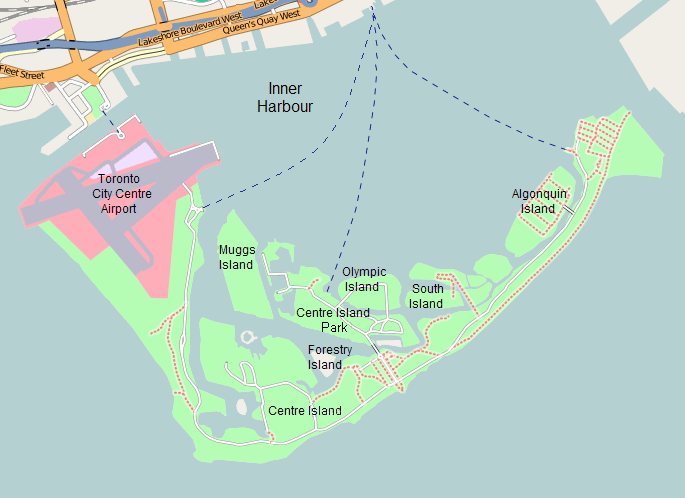
Routes of the Toronto Island ferries.

There are four public ferry routes to the islands. Three routes run from the Jack Layton Ferry Terminal to the Toronto Island Park. A fourth route runs from the foot of Bathurst Street to Billy Bishop Toronto City Airport on the island. Beside the public ferry services, several yacht clubs and marinas located on the islands provide private ferry services for their members and guests. Private water taxi services are available from locations along the waterfront.

The Parks, Forestry and Recreation Division of the City of Toronto government operates three public ferry routes to Hanlan's Point, Centre Island Park and Ward's Island from Jack Layton Terminal at the foot of Bay Street on the central Toronto waterfront. During spring and fall, the ferries operate on a 45-minute round trip. During summer months, the ferries make a round trip each half-hour. During the winter months, ferries serve Ward's Island at longer intervals, and Hanlan's Point only as needed to deliver or pick up vehicles. As of 2022, the adult fare is $8.70 with various reduced fares for seniors (65 and over), youth (15 to 19) and junior (two to 14). Infants (under two) ride free. Monthly passes are available by age category.

The ferries operating from the Jack Layton Ferry Terminal carry 1.4 million people each year to the islands, making 17,000 trips. There are up to five ferries available for this service. One ferry, the Trillium, is a semi-retired heritage vessel that sees only occasional service. Only one ferry, the Ongiara, operates in winter, servicing the Wards Island dock; it can carry road vehicles as well as passengers.

PortsToronto operates a vehicle and passenger ferry from Eireann Quay at the foot of Bathurst Street to the island airport every 15 minutes during airport operating hours. The ferry is free of charge for pedestrians, but as of 2022, there is a $14 fee for vehicles. The ferry trip is 121 metres (397 ft) long and takes 90 seconds. However, most visitors to the airport would use the pedestrian tunnel from the mainline to the airport. There is no public access between the airport and the rest of the island chain.

== History ==
The first ferry to cross Toronto Harbour to what are now the Toronto Islands was in 1833, using a boat called Sir John of the Peninsula. This was a four-horse team boat, operated by Michael O'Connor, between York and his hotel on the island (then still a peninsula), known as the "Retreat on the Peninsula." At this time, persons could still access the peninsula from a road to the east of York, crossing over the Don. In 1835, the hotel came under new management and the first steam-powered ferry to the hotel, the Toronto was inaugurated. However, the steamboat was removed from service and sold and the horse boat reinstated. The popularity of the peninsula increased and in 1836, the city established a toll gate on the road, charging sixpence for every four-wheeled carriage drawn by two horses and other tolls for smaller carriages, wagons or riders.

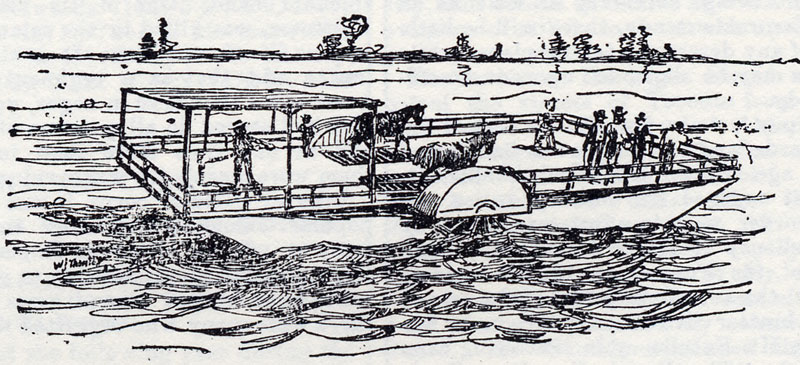
In 1843, the first Peninsula Packet, was pressed into service to transport people to the islands.

In 1843, the Peninsula Packet, a converted steamboat, which was propelled by paddle wheels driven by horses was pressed into service for the hotel. The ferry operated until 1850. In 1853, the hotel came under new management again, that of John Quinn. Quinn introduced another steam ferry, the Victoria. Competition for the ferry business came the next year when Robert Moodie introduced his own the steam ferry, the Bob Moodie. Quinn responded with another vessel, the Welland, another steam ferry. In 1857, Moodie added the Lady Head steam vessel. A vicious storm hit the island on April 13, 1858, destroying Quinn's hotel and the Parkinson's hotel and creating a 500-yard (460 m)-wide eastern gap making the previous peninsula an island.

Throughout the rest of the 19th-century, the popularity of the Island increased. Competition abounded - there were 47 ferries operating in the Harbour in the 1850s. With no links to the mainland, ferries proliferated, with most being paddle steamers operated by individual owners. Eventually, two competing ferry companies came into being: the Turner Ferry Company and A.J. Tymon's Island Ferry Company. The assets of the Turner Ferry Company (founded 1882) were bought by the John Doty Engine & Ferry Company, which in turn merged with A.J. Tymon's Island Ferry Company in 1892 to form the Toronto Ferry Company.

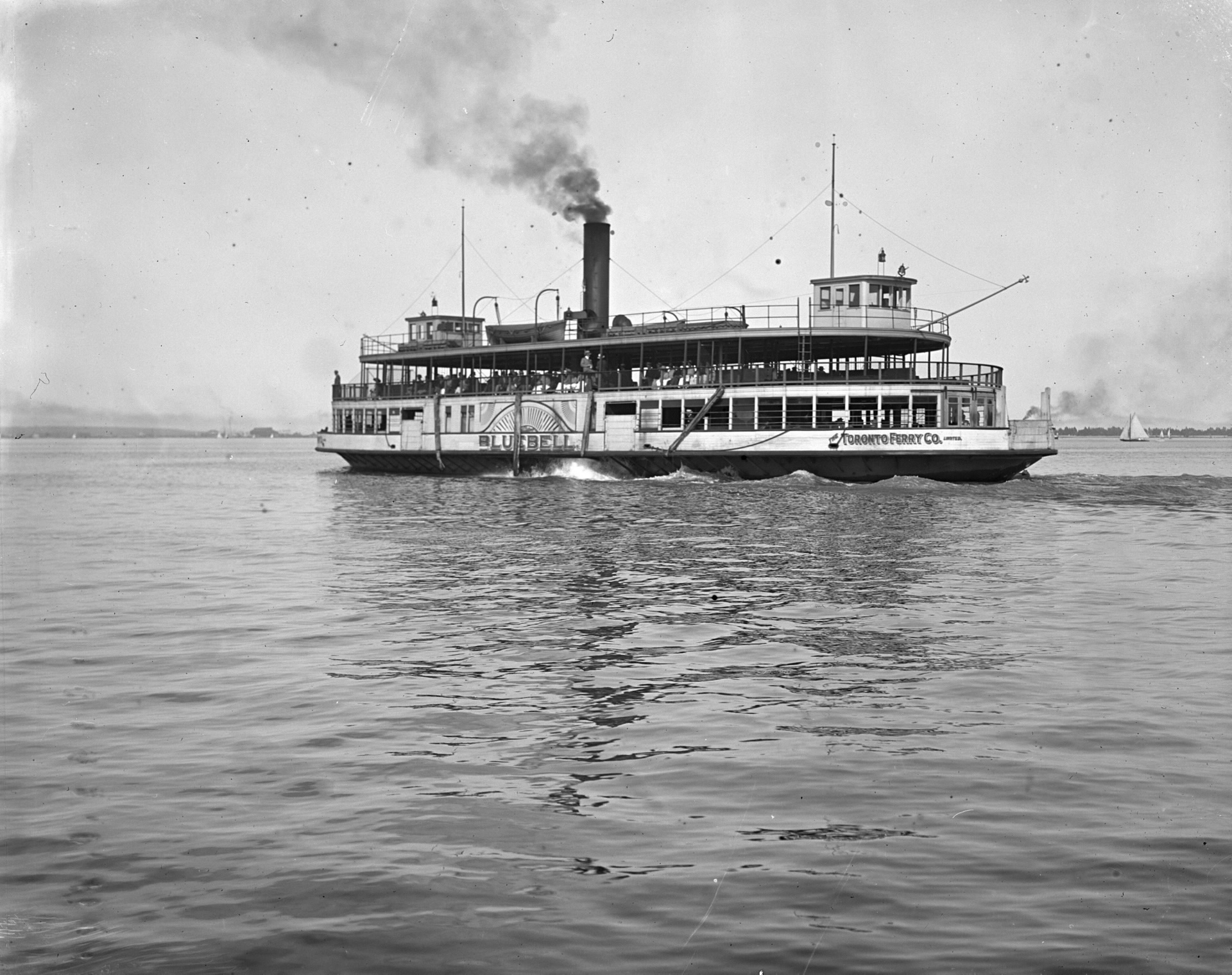
Bluebell in 1920. Built by the Toronto Ferry Company in 1906, the ship ferried people to the islands until it was retired in 1955.

In 1906 and 1910, the Toronto Ferry Company built two double-decked, double-ended paddle steamers, with a capacity of 1,450 passengers. They were named Bluebell and Trillium. They were retired in 1955 and 1957 respectively, but Trillium survived and re-entered service in 1976. It is operated by the Great Lakes Schooner Company for corporate and private functions, and for ferry runs throughout the summer. It is now 115–116 years old. The hull of Bluebell is now a sunken break wall at Leslie Spit.

The Toronto Ferry Company continued to operate the ferry services until 1926, when its services and fleet was purchased by the City of Toronto for CA$337,500 ($6.02 million in 2025 dollars). The Toronto Ferry Co was in arrears on rent to the City to the amount of $6,500 and only operated in 1926 with the assurance that the City would buy the boats at the end of the season. In February 1927, the city transferred the eight-boat fleet to the Toronto Transportation Commission (TTC, later renamed the Toronto Transit Commission), the body that operates the city's transit system. Three boats included in the purchase - the John Hanlan, the Jasmine and the Clark Bros were found to be in poor condition and all ended up being burned for amusement at Sunnyside Amusement Park.

The three double-ended, diesel-engined and screw-driven ferries that form the backbone of today's service to the islands were built for the TTC. The William Inglis was built in 1935, the Sam McBride in 1939, and the Thomas Rennie in 1951.

In 1938, the Toronto Harbour Commission began operating a ferry service to the new Toronto Island Airport, then under construction. A scow was adapted for use as a cable ferry, with the intention that this ferry would operate for a five-year period. However, the scow remained in service for 25 years before being replaced by the ferry Maple City. The backup ferry Windmill Point was acquired in 1985 and a new replacement ferry, TCCA1, in 2006. The Port Authority subsequently purchased another ferry, the Marilyn Bell 1.

On January 1, 1962, the ferry services operated by the TTC were transferred to Metro Toronto Parks and Culture, a department of the then municipality of Metropolitan Toronto. In 1966, Parks Commissioner Tommy Thompson suggested buying hovercraft to replace the ferries, but failed to gain political interest. Other possibilities that were floated were a vehicle tunnel, a bridge over the Eastern Gap and a monorail. In 1997, Metro Toronto and the Metro municipalities were amalgamated into Toronto, and the park ferry services became the responsibility of the City of Toronto's Department of Parks and Recreation, today the Parks, Forestry and Recreation Division. The airport ferry is the responsibility of PortsToronto.

Between 1935 and 1938, the ferries carried two million passengers per year. This dropped around World War II to a low of 510,000 in 1960. In the 1960s, the numbers started increasing again, to one million in 1966. In 1970, the ferries carried 1.42 million passengers to the Islands. This declined in subsequent years, attributed to the introduction of other attractions in Toronto. In 1995, annual passenger numbers were 1.21 million passengers, with an average summer day carrying 25,000 passengers and an average winter day carrying 500 passengers. The 1995 annual budget to operate the ferries was CA$4.5 million, of which ticket revenues covered CA$4 million. The ferry service regularly runs a deficit, ranging from $647 in 1926 to $500,000 in 1954. The annual subsidy was once considered a scandalous waste of money.

Safety standards have been updated over the years, and the ferries were allowed to continue to operate under a "grandfather" clause. In 2012, Thomas Rennie, William Inglis and Sam McBride engines and bulkheads were updated. The modernization meant that they were no longer "grandfathered" and were then in contravention. The ferries' passenger capacity was reduced, and Transport Canada agreed to restore the ferries' "grandfather" status.

In October 2012, Toronto City Council decided that funds should be set aside to replace Thomas Rennie and her two fleet-mates with new vessels.

In January 2022, the city proposed that the new ferries be all electric and recommended the build be awarded to Concept Naval Experts Maritimes Inc. of Quebec. Of the 5 ferries serving the Toronto Islands from the Jack Layton Ferry Terminal, the proposal would replace the Ongiara, the William Inglis, the Sam McBride and the Thomas Rennie but not the Trillium, a heritage vessel. All 5 vessels are between 50 and 100 years old. Vessel replacement would occur over 15 years.

On August 20, 2022, ferry Sam McBride hit the mainland dock at the Jack Layton Terminal, resulting in the injury of 12 passengers. An investigation into the crash by The Transportation Safety Board of Canada released in 2024 said its investigation found a number of issues, particularly around passenger safety and emergency preparedness. It discovered that Toronto had no written procedures for ferry docking speed.

== Docks ==
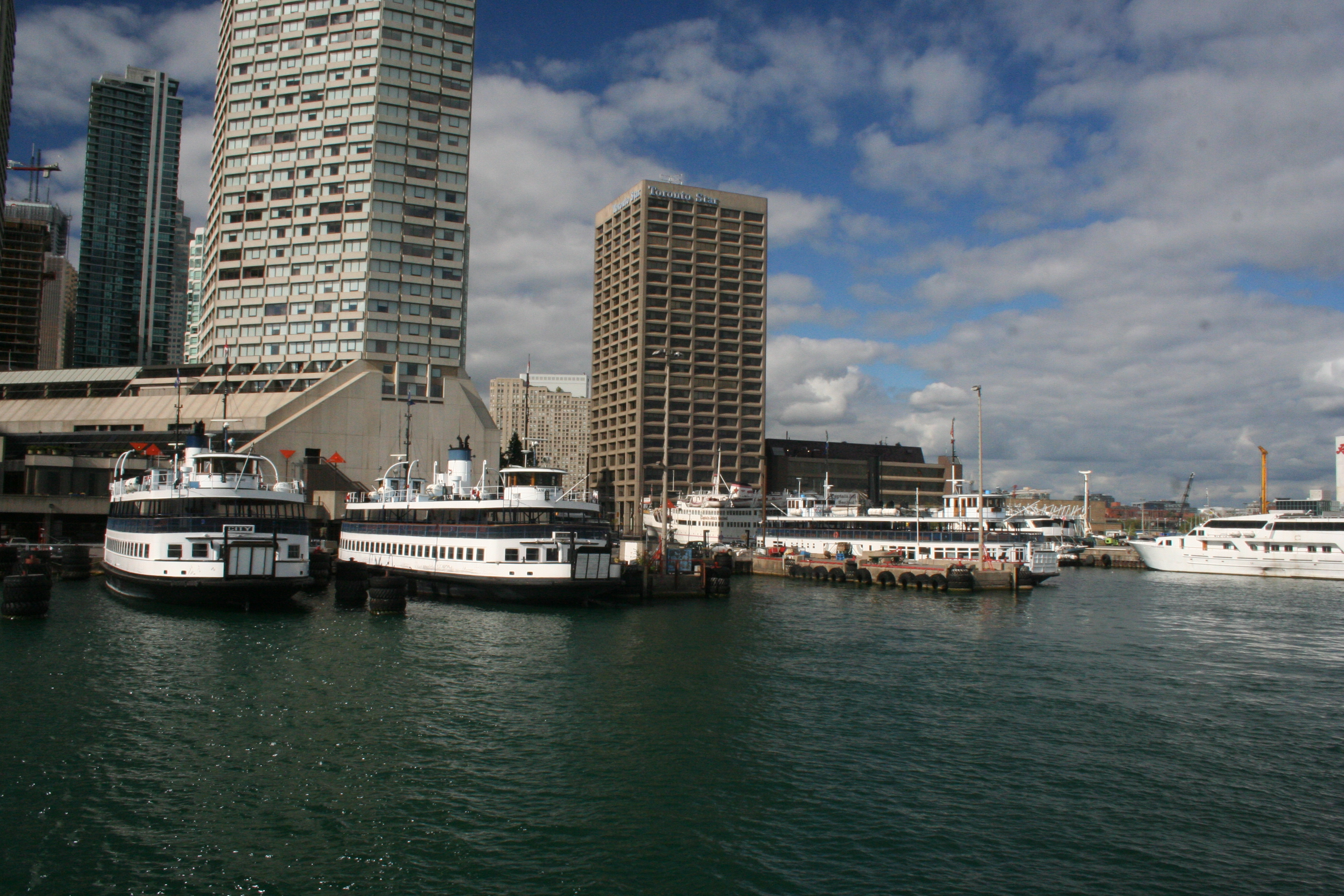
Jack Layton Ferry Terminal is located in Downtown Toronto.

With the exception of the Jack Layton Ferry Terminal, no other docks are enclosed and consist merely of a series of metal fences and ramps.

=== Jack Layton Ferry Terminal ===
The Jack Layton Ferry Terminal is located at the foot of Bay Street on the mainland and consists of four piers. They are located in the enclosed main docks, and the last pier is an open area to the east for the larger Trillium ferry boat. During winter months the ferries (other than Trillium) are stored here with upper decks covered with a tarp. Trillium is stored at nearby Yonge Street Slip.

The original docks were located on the east side of the Toronto Harbour Commission Building at Bay and Harbour Streets. When the infilling took place after 1918 the docks moved to Queen's Quay West between Yonge Street and Bay Street (now the site of the Harbour Square condos) before being moved to the west to the current location. The Toronto City Council voted unanimously to rename the terminal in honour of late New Democratic Party leader and former Toronto City Councillor Jack Layton.

=== Airport ferry docks ===
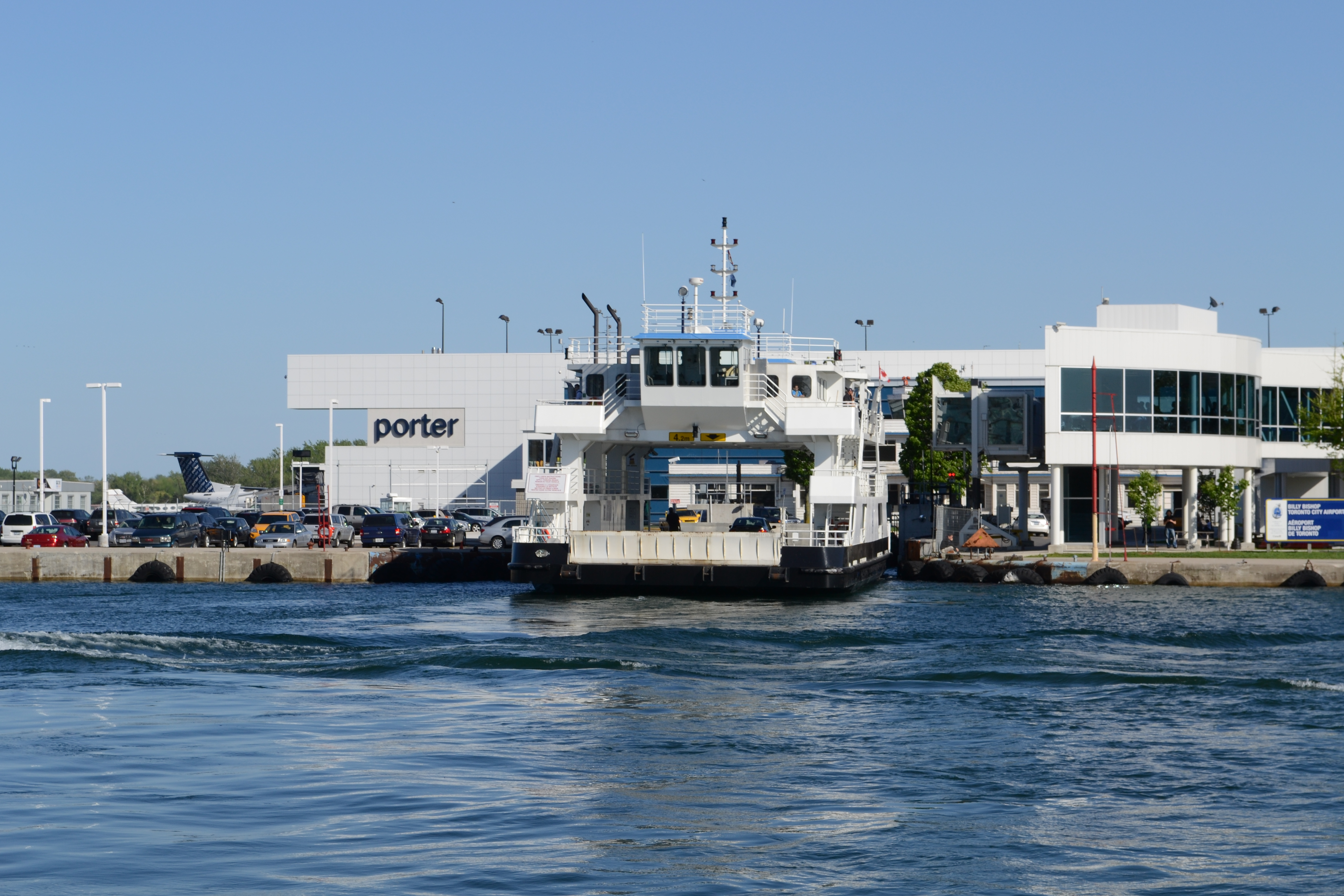
Marilyn Bell I docked at the Island Airport docks

The Western Gap is at the foot of Eireann Quay and consists of a single pier. Parking is available for cars not crossing to the Island. The Island Airport Dock is at the north end of the island airport and consists of a single pier and a loading ramp. These two docks are used by the Toronto Port Authority.

=== Centre Island docks ===
Centre Island Docks is on Island Park and consists of two piers. There are washrooms, a Subway (restaurant) and a Pizza Pizza nearby. There is no winter service from this dock. A covered area was added to provide additional shelter space. Flooding of the islands in 2017 put the dock out of commission, causing the Centreville Amusement Park to remain closed for the season. The dock was rebuilt for the 2019 season to accommodate higher lake levels and the 2019 flooding did not close the dock.

=== Hanlan's Point docks ===
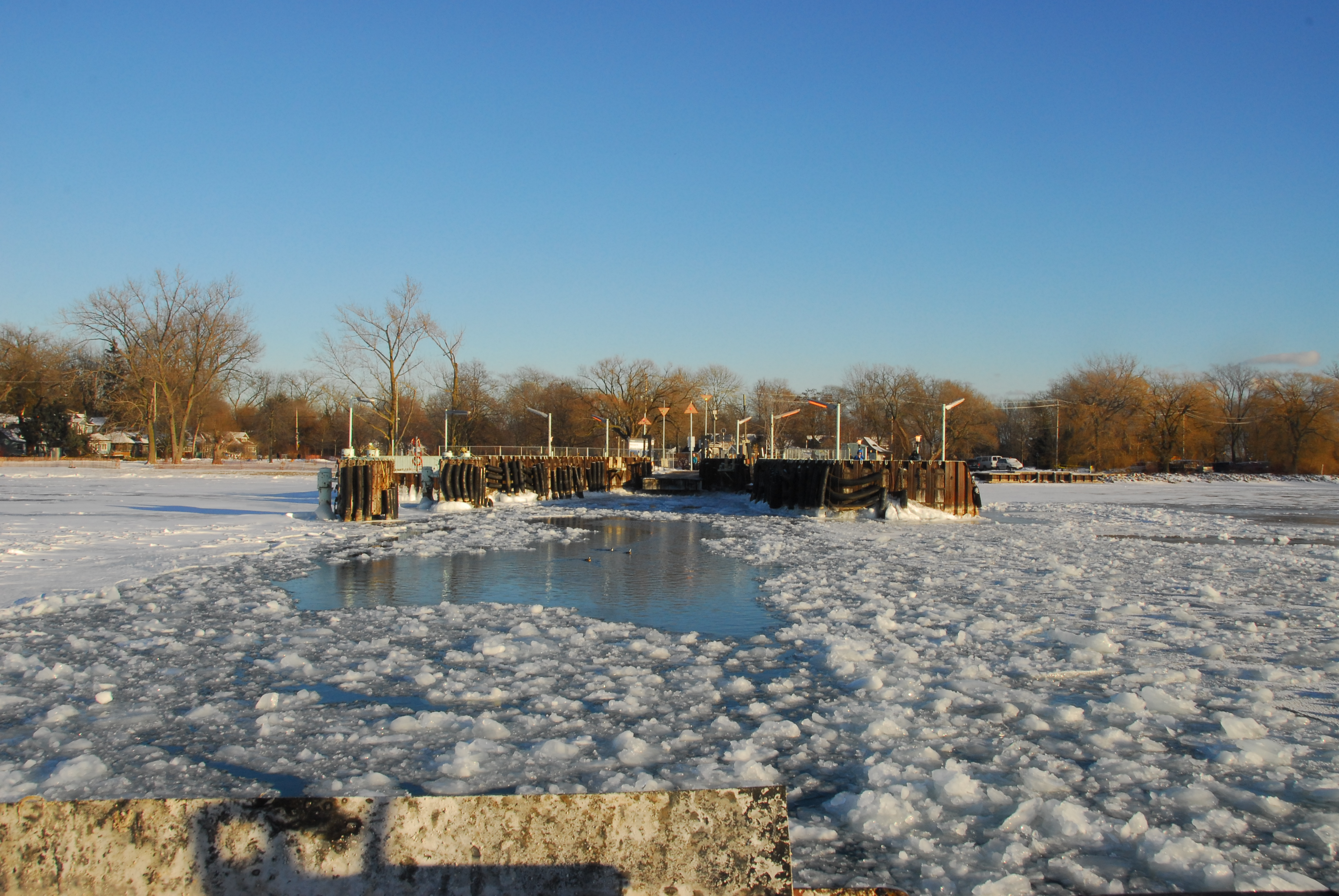
The docks on Ward's Island are located on the east.

Hanlan's Point Dock is located to the west next to the island airport; open boarding area consists of three piers. There are washrooms and a snack bar nearby. The tugboat Ned Hanlan is located nearby. Hanlan's Point used to be called Gibraltar Point, and from 1794 to 1813 it was home to a British Army fortification or battery (storehouses and guardhouse), then a blockhouse from 1814 to 1823.

=== Ward's Island docks ===
Ward's Island Docks is on Ward's Island to the east; an open boarding area consists of a single pier.

== In popular culture ==
Allan Moak's children's book A Big City ABC prominently displays an illustration of the Toronto Island Ferry, Sam McBride on its cover. It was also featured as "Flo and Merriweather" in Mighty Machines. The band Great Lake Swimmers named their album Ongiara after the ferry.

== Fleet ==
Active and future Toronto Island ferries
| Vessel | Image | Builder^{A} | Operator^{B} | Acquired | Capacity | Type^{C} | Notes |
|---|---|---|---|---|---|---|---|
| Trillium | | PIW | TFC, TTC, MPC, TPR | 1910 | Originally 1,450; reduced to 955 | DEDD paddle steamer | Built 1910. Retired in 1957 and stored next to Island Water Filtration Plant, but re-entered service in 1976 after being refurbished. Sister ship of Bluebell. |
| William Inglis | | TDC & JIC | TTC, MPC, TPR | 1935 | 400 passengers | DEDD diesel screw | Originally launched as Shamrock, it was renamed after the death of William Inglis, head of local appliance manufacturer John Inglis and Sons. |
| Sam McBride | | TDC & JIC | TTC, MPC, TPR | 1939 | 1,000 passengers - reduced to 524 and then to 736 due to upgrades to bulkhead and engines in 2011; 915 as of 2022 | DEDD diesel screw | Named after former Toronto Mayor and alderman Sam McBride. |
| Thomas Rennie | | TDC & JIC | TTC, MPC, TPR | 1951 | 1,000 passengers - reduced to 524 and then to 736 due to upgrades to bulkhead and engines in 2011 | DEDD diesel screw | Named after former Toronto Harbour Commissioner Thomas Rennie. |
| Windmill Point | | KS | TPA/PT | 1954 | 207 passengers | DESD diesel | Purchased by the Toronto Harbour Commission in 1985 and stored at Keating Channel when not in service. Now owned by Toronto Island Marina. |
| Ongiara | | RB | TTC, MPC, TPR | 1963 | 220 passengers, 10 cars or 8 trucks | DESD diesel screw | Name based on Mohawk word for for point of land cut. Used to provide winter service and to carry service vehicles. Repowered in November 2006. |
| Maple City | | | TPA/PT | 1964 | 40 passengers and 6 cars | DESD diesel screw | Operates to the island airport when Marilyn Bell I is out of service. Built 1951 by Muir Brothers Dock Yard for Prescott-Ogdensburg ferry service. |
| David Hornell (formerly TCCA1) | | HMP | TPA/PT | 2006 | | DEDD diesel | Operates to the island airport. Original name was an acronym of Toronto City Centre Airport 1. Now named for Toronto-born RCAF pilot and World War II ace Flt-Lt. David Hornell (1910-1944). |
| Marilyn Bell I (formerly TCCA2) | | HMP | TPA/PT | 2009 | | DEDD 2009-2021; DEE (2021-) | Operates to the island airport. Original name was an acronym of Toronto City Centre Airport 2. Renamed for Toronto-born long distant swimmer Marilyn Bell. Converted as electric Li-Ion in 2021. |
| Lady of the Quays | | Damen Group Galați / Concept Naval, Quebec | TPR | ~ late 2026 | 615 passengers with 14 cars/trucks or 1300 passengers only | DEE RoPax | Launched in May 2026. Will replace Ongiara |
| Toronto Islander | | Damen Group Galați / Concept Naval, Quebec | TPR | ~ early 2027 | 1300 passengers only | DEE Pax | Will replace William Inglis |

Inactive ferries
| Vessel | Builder^{A} | Operator^{B} | Acquired | Retired | Capacity | | Notes |
|---|---|---|---|---|---|---|---|
| Luella | WAC, JDE | TuF, TFC, TTC | 1882 | 1934 | 122 passengers | SESD paddle steamer | Accidentally burned 1934. |
| Canadian | Alexander Clindinning | TuF, TFC | 1882 | ?? | | | |
| Prouvette Beyer | | TuF, TFC | 1882 | ?? | | | |
| Sadie | James Andrew's of Oakville | TuF | 1882 | ?? | | Originally Ste Jean Baptiste | |
| Mayflower | BSW | JDE, TFC, TTC | 1890 | 1938 | 900–1,000 passengers | DEDD paddle steamer | Built 1890. After retirement converted into a barge. Sister ship to Primrose. |
| Primrose | BSW | JDE, TFC, TTC | 1890 | 1938 | 900–1,000 passengers | DEDD paddle steamer | Built 1890. After retirement converted into a barge. Sister ship to Mayflower. |
| Ned Hanlan | TDC | TFC, TTC, MPR | 1932 | 1966 | | Harbour tug | Launched in 1932. Used to provide winter ferry service for island residents. Named for local rowing legend Ned Hanlan, brother-in-law of Lawrence Solman, owner of the Toronto Ferry Company. Now displayed at Hanlan's Point. |
| Bluebell | PIW | TFC, TTC | 1906 | 1955 | 1,450 passengers | DEDD paddle steamer | Built 1906. Retired 1955 and stripped down and used by Metro Toronto Works Department as a garbage scow (barge). After conversion, it sank twice and required a flotation tank. Its hull is part of the breakwall at Tommy Thompson Park near the Eastern Gap. Sister ship of Trillium. |
| Miss York | | TFC, TTC | 1918 | 1929 | | | Burned 1929? |
| Miss Simcoe | | TFC, TTC | 1918 | 1929 | | | Possibly named for Elizabeth Simcoe, the wife of John Graves Simcoe. Burned 1929. |
| Clark Bros. | | TFC, TTC | 1890 | 1927 | | | Built 1890. Clark Bros. 2 built in 1906. Named for Tom (T.J.) Clark; burned in 1930 at Sunnyside Amusement Park. |
| John Hanlan | Abbey | TFC, TTC | 1918 | 1927 | | | Built 1884 in Dalhousie, Ontario. Named for Toronto Island hotel keeper John Hanlan, father of Ned Hanlan and father-in-law of Lawrence Solman, owner of the Toronto Ferry Company; burned 1929. |
| T.J. Clark | CL & PIW | TFC, TTC, MPR | 1911 | 1930 | | Wooden screw ferry | Named for Tom "T.J." Clark, co-operator of wooden screw ferry that began service in 1890. Operated as ferry from 1911 to 1927; sold to City of Toronto and operated by the TTC. Decommissioned 1959 and sold to Toronto Drydock Company Ltd.; scrapped by 1961. |
| Aylmer | | TFC, TTC | 1918 | 1929 | | | |
| Buttercup | | TFC, TTC | 1918 | 1929 | | | |
| Jasmine 2 | | TFC, TTC | 1918 | 1929 | | | Built 1906. Renamed Ojiboway. Burned 1929. |
| (Island) Airport ferry | Unknown builder for THC | THC | ~1937 | retired | 48 | DE cable driven | Built by THC the scow was converted to a double ended cable powered ferry for workers building the airport and in 1939 provided passenger and limited car (~3) access to airport from 1939-1965 |
| Shiawassie | Gormley | TPA/PT | 1962 | 1977 | 68 | Two 180 hp diesel engines | Name based on Chippewan word for river straight ahead. The Shiawassie was purchased in 1962 by the Parks Department for CA$41,000. It was sold in 1977. |

== See also ==
- Bay Ferries Great Lakes Limited
- Hiawatha (ship, 1895)
- Kwasind
- Toronto Ferry Company
- Toronto water taxis
- Victoria Park - an amusement park in Toronto that operated ferry serviceHumbery Bay from 1878 until 1895 - used palace steamer Canadian and Gertude in 1887
- Humber Steam Ferry or Humber River Ferry Company Limited - a ferry service using the screw steamer Annie Craig from mouth of Humber River to Toronto operating from 1882 to 1886
  - Service was replaced by Doty Brothers ferries Queen City and Canadian in 1886
