= William Inglis (ferry) =

Ferry operated by Toronto, Ontario, Canada

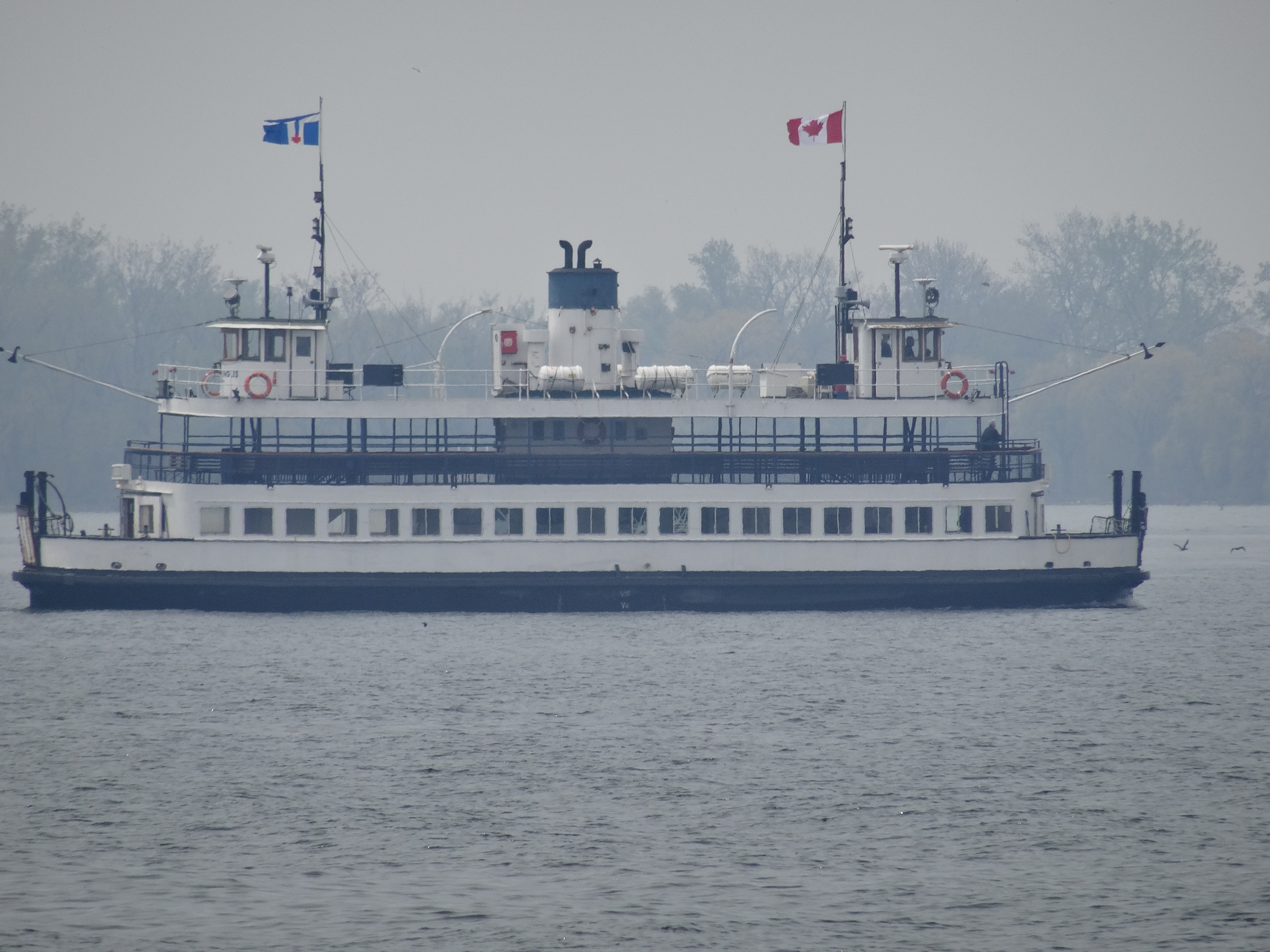
- William Inglis in 2015

History
- Name: William Inglis
- Owner: Toronto Parks, Forestry and Recreation Division, Toronto
- Operator: Toronto Parks, Forestry and Recreation Division
- Port of registry: Toronto
- Builder: Toronto Drydock Company, Toronto
- In service: 1935
- Status: In active service

General characteristics
- Type: Ferry
- Tonnage: 234 tonnes
- Length: 27.65 metres (90.7 ft)
- Beam: 62 metres (203 ft)
- Draft: 2.62 metres (8.6 ft)
- Decks: 2
- Capacity: 400

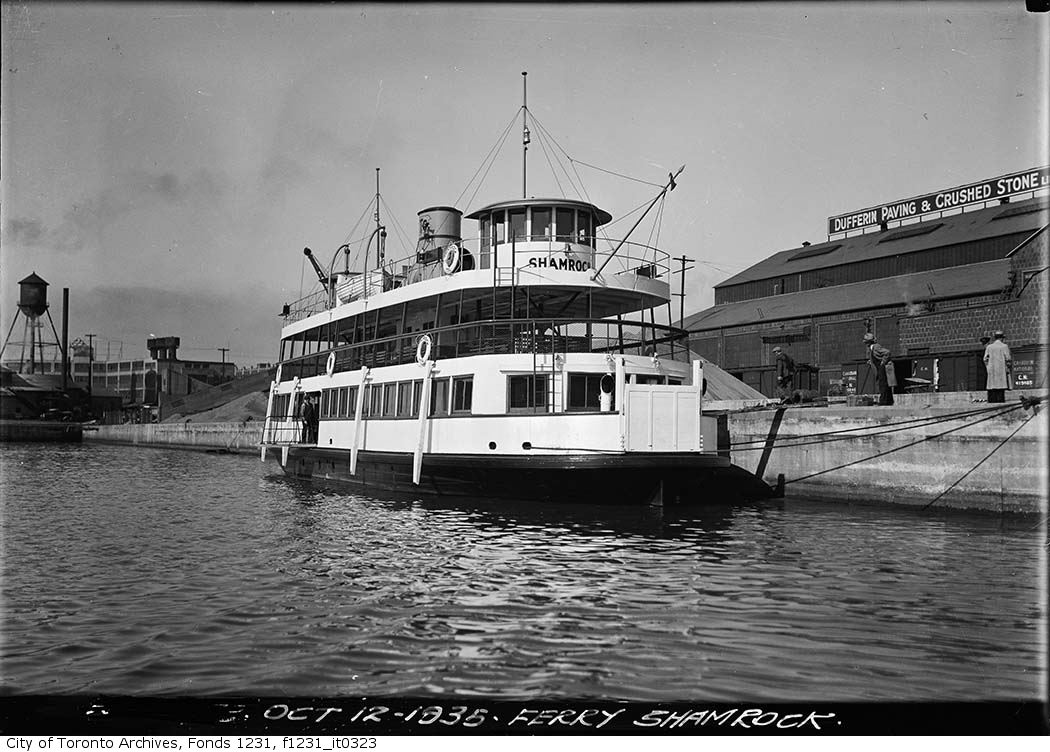
View of new Shamrock ferry in 1935

William Inglis is a Toronto Island ferry operated by the Parks, Forestry and Recreation Division of the City of Toronto government (City of Toronto). The ferry serves the Toronto Islands from a dock at Jack Layton Ferry Terminal in downtown Toronto, Ontario, Canada.

It entered service in 1935, initially known as the "Shamrock". The ferry was built by the Toronto Drydock Company. It was the first of three ferries built, to replace the aged ferries the City of Toronto inherited when it took over ferry operations from private industry. Initially, responsibility for operating a ferry service was assigned to the Toronto Transportation Commission. It is now operated by the Parks Division.

After the death of Toronto industrialist William Inglis, who headed John Inglis and Company, in November 1935, the ferry was renamed in his honour by the Toronto City Council. Inglis also served as the president of the Canadian National Exhibition and was one of the governors of Toronto Western Hospital.

In August 1948, the William Inglis participated in the saving of 12 persons, whose racing sloop had capsized in Toronto Harbour. Three of the twelve clinging to the mast were brought aboard the ferry before speedboats arrived from the John St. Lifesaving Station and recovered the others.

In 2012, the boat's engine and bulkhead were updated. Although the boat was exempt from 2012 safety regulations under a "grandfather clause", the modernization invalidated the grandfather provision. In order to continue operating, the ferry's passenger capacity was reduced. In October 2012, Toronto City Council decided that funds should be set aside to replace William Inglis, and its two fleet-mates, Thomas Rennie and Sam McBride, with new vessels.

In December 2013, the ferry had to be taken out of service to repair a leak in its hull. In its absence, island ferry service to Ward's Island was disrupted.

== See also ==
- PS Trillium
- Ongiara (ferry)
