= Imperial Munitions Board =

Canadian branch of the British Ministry of Munitions during WWI

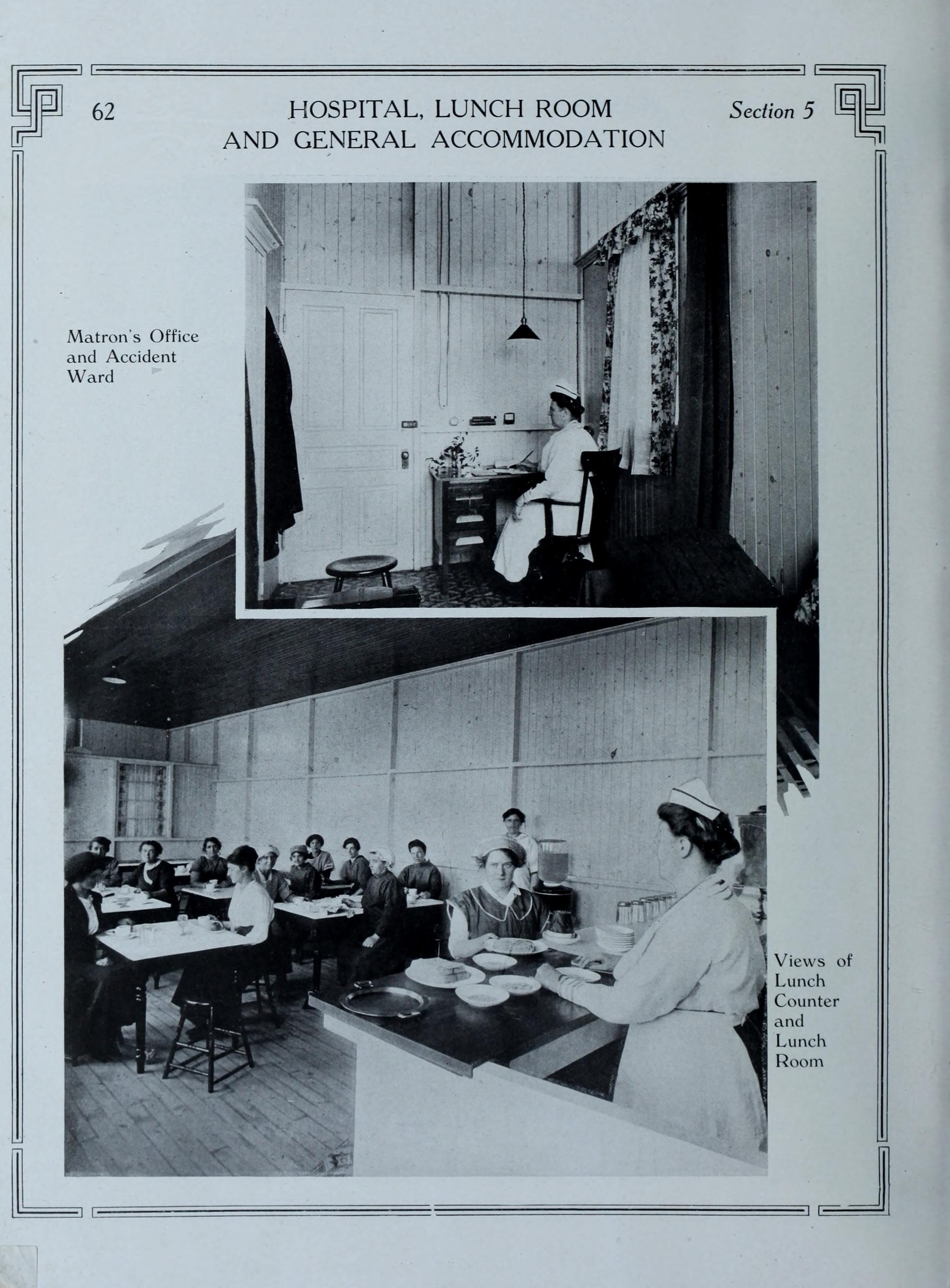
Women involved in the production of munitions (1916)

The Imperial Munitions Board (IMB) was the Canadian branch of the British Ministry of Munitions, set up in Canada under the chairmanship of Joseph Wesley Flavelle. It was formed by the British War Cabinet to alleviate the Shell Crisis of 1915 during the First World War. The Board was mandated to arrange for the manufacture of war materials in Canada on behalf of the British government.

It was the general and exclusive purchasing agent on behalf of the War Office, the Admiralty, the British Timber Controller, the Department of Aeronautics and the Ministry of Munitions, and also acted as an agent for the United States Ordnance Department.

== History and organization ==
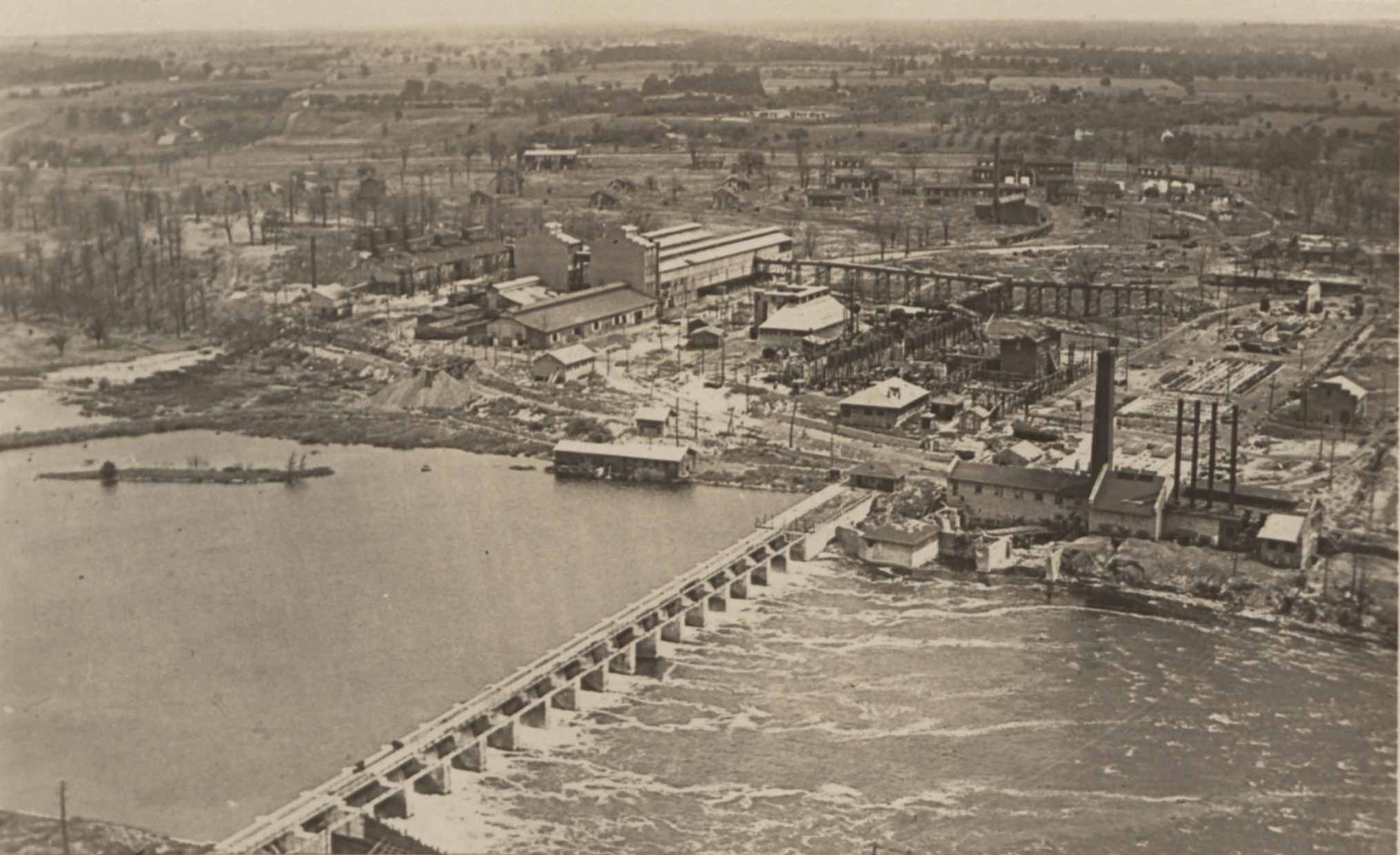
Trenton plant seen from the air in 1919.

Shortly after the outbreak of World War I, the War Office approached the Canadian Department of Militia and Defence as to the possibility of supplying shells. Its Minister, Sam Hughes, appointed a Shell Committee in September 1914 to act on the War Office's behalf. The following were its members:

Shell Committee membership
Class	Members of the Shell Committee
Initial appointments	General Bertram, Chairman (Note: Prior to the War, Bertram was the President of John Bertram & Sons, Dundas, Ontario, notable for the manufacture of the hydraulic rams used in the Peterborough Lift Lock); Lieutenant Colonel Geo. W. Watts (Note: formerly a works manager with Canadian General Electric); Colonel Thos. Cantley (Note: formerly of the Nova Scotia Steel Company, a predecessor of the Dominion Steel and Coal Corporation)
Later members	E. Carnegie (Note: formerly of the Electric Steel and Metals Company of Welland, Ontario); Colonel C. Greville-Harston (Note: formerly with the Royal Marine Light Infantry before retiring in 1871 and moving to Canada, he later became an offices in the Royal Grenadiers and patented many military innovations); Lieutenant Colonel F.D. Lafferty, Superintendent, Dominion Arsenal, Quebec; Colonel T. Benson, Master General of Ordnance; Colonel David Carnegie, Ordnance Adviser (Note: described as "a consulting engineer of high standing"); J.W. Borden, Chief Accountant for the Department

When the contracts became mired in political patronage that led to profiteering, (Note: including ones given to the former employers of Bertram, Cantley and E. Carnegie, as well as to the Universal Steel and Tool Company (owned and controlled by William Mackenzie and Donald Mann) David Lloyd George sent Lord Rhondda to Canada to investigate. Lionel Hitchens (Note: head of the shipbuilding firm Cammell Laird) and R.H. Brand then came over and approached Joseph Wesley Flavelle to help form the IMB, and this move received the approval of Prime Minister Sir Robert Borden. In December 1915, the following were appointed:

IMB Organization
Class	Members of the Board	Purchasing Agent
Initial appointments	J.W. Flavelle, Chairman; C.B. Gordon, Vice-Chairman (Note: Departed in 1917, upon his appointment as the Director-General of War Supplies of the British War Mission, and Representative of the Ministry of Munitions, in Washington); Colonel D. Carnegie; J.F. Perry (Note: financial member of the Board) (Note: A fellow colleague of Brand in Milner's Kindergarten, they, together with Flavelle, belonged to the Toronto Round Table); J.A. Vaillancourt (Note: President of the Banque d'Hochelaga); E.R. Wood (Note: brother of Frank Porter Wood and, in association with George Albertus Cox, founder of Dominion Securities Corporation Limited)	E. Fitzgerald
Later appointments	Brigadier General Alex Bertram, Vice-Chairman; R.H. Brand (Note: From 1915 to 1917, Brand served as the Board's representative in London, acting as the key link between that body and the Ministry of Munitions.); Brigadier General W.E. Edwards (Note: of the Royal Field Artillery) (Note: later placed in charge of the Ministry of Munition's Department of Inspection in 1916)	A.G. Woodhouse (Note: upon Fitzgerald's appointment as Assistant to the Chairman)

As Chairman, Flavelle had full administrative and executive authority. The Board operated through twenty departments, of which the most important were Purchasing and Steel, Shipbuilding, Explosives, Forging, Aviation, Timber, Fuze and Engineering.

As certain shell manufacture contracts had been granted to persons that did not even have workshops, their holders were given deadlines to either start manufacturing them or forfeit the contracts. This led to political controversy later on, as the losers started to falsely accuse Flavelle of profiteering as well, because of his connection to the meat packing business.

== Scope ==
In a 1917 address, Carnegie reported that the Board was then dealing with 650 factories in 144 towns, stretching from Halifax to Victoria. By 1918, the extent of its acquisition of lumber required the operation of 67 logging camps in British Columbia. The British Government was responsible for all its expenditure.

The British War Cabinet also noted the extent of Canada's war production in 1918:

15 per cent of the total expenditure of the Ministry of Munitions in the last six months of the year was incurred in that country. She has manufactured nearly every type of shell from the 18-pounder to the 9.2-inch. In the case of the 18-pdr., no less than 55 per cent of the output of shrapnel shells in the last six months came from Canada, and most of these were complete rounds of ammunition, which went direct to France. Canada also contributed 42 per cent of the total 4.5 shells, 27 per cent of the 6-inch shells, 20 per cent of the 60-pdr. H.E. shells, 15 per cent of the 8-inch and 16 per cent of the 9.2-inch. In addition Canada has supplied shell forgings, ammunition components, propel[l]ants, acetone, T.N.T., aluminum, nickel, aeroplane parts, agricultural machinery and timber, beside quantities of railway materials, including no less than 450 miles of rails torn up from Canadian railways, which were shipped direct to France.

Because the private sector was unwilling or unable to operate in certain fields, the Board established seven "National plants" for the production of explosives and propellants, and one for the manufacture of airplanes. The Board also oversaw the production of ships and aircraft.

It also formed several subsidiaries to perform several of the manufacturing functions, which were spread across Canada. These included:

IMB National Plants
Company (Note: IMB subsidiary, except for Energite)	Location		Function	Extent
Canadian Aeroplanes Ltd.	Wallace Emerson, Toronto, Ontario	43°40′03″N 79°26′31″W	Production of the JN-4(Can) Canuck, the Felixstowe F5L flying boat, and the Avro 504.	The factory had 6 acres (2.4 ha) of floor space, and its construction took only 2.5 months to complete.
British Cordite Ltd.	Nobel, Ontario (Note: Operated by Canadian Explosives Limited (a predecessor of Canadian Industries Limited), on behalf of British Cordite)	45°24′45″N 80°04′59″W	Production of cordite.	The site covered 366 acres (148 ha) and had 155 buildings.
British Chemical Co. Ltd.	Trenton, Ontario (Note: located on the east side of the Trent River near Number 1 Dam, before it empties into the Bay of Quinte)	44°07′08″N 77°35′20″W	Production of sulphuric acid, nitric acid, pyro-cotton, nitrocellulose powder and TNT.	The plant covered 255 acres (103 ha) and contained 204 buildings, and at the time was the largest ammunition factory in the British Empire.
British Forgings Ltd.	Ashbridge's Bay, Toronto, Ontario (Note: Located to the southeast from Commissioners Street and Munition Street)	43°38′47″N 79°21′01″W	Recycling of light steel turnings which arose from shell production, through melting down and recasting into ingots.	The site covered 127.6 acres (51.6 ha), on land leased from the Toronto Harbour Commission, and was at the time the world's largest electrical steel plant.
British Munitions Supply Co. Ltd.	Verdun, Quebec	45°28′19″N 73°34′00″W	Assembly of fuses.	Colloquially known as "La Poudrière", the plant had 4000 (almost exclusively female) employees that assembled eight million fuses.
Energite Explosives Co. Ltd.	Haileybury, Ontario (Note: Operated by Energite for the IMB. It also had other plants at Widdifield, Ontario and Renfrew, Ontario.)		Loading and assembling operations on 18-pounder British shrapnel shells.	The operation had 800 employees and produced eight million completed rounds of ammunition.

When the Montreal Gazette profiled the War Toronto on its first visit to Montreal, on April 30, 1919, they described her as the last of 46 vessels built for the Imperial Munitions Board.

The IMB was dissolved in 1919. The process began immediately after the Armistice, when the Ministry of Munitions directed that it would be implemented through the following stages:

1. Production of all shells and explosives would cease immediately.
2. Gradually cease the production of items no longer required by the Government but which may be useful elsewhere (ie, metals and other materials).
3. Maintain contracts for articles still likely to be required (ie, commercial lumber and ships).

== Impact ==
When contracting was transferred from the Shell Committee to the IMB, Flavelle decided that fair wage clauses would not be inserted into future contracts that were granted, although British and Canadian authorities did not object to continuing the prior practice. As the IMB was a British agency, its activities with respect to labour relations did not fall under federal jurisdiction until the passage of an order in council in March 1916 that extended the application of the Industrial Disputes Investigation Act, 1907, but Flavelle's opposition continued. This had the effect of disrupting relations with the Trades and Labour Congress of Canada, which would lead to the outbreak of strikes in 1918 and massive labour confrontations in 1919.
