= Sam McBride (ferry) =

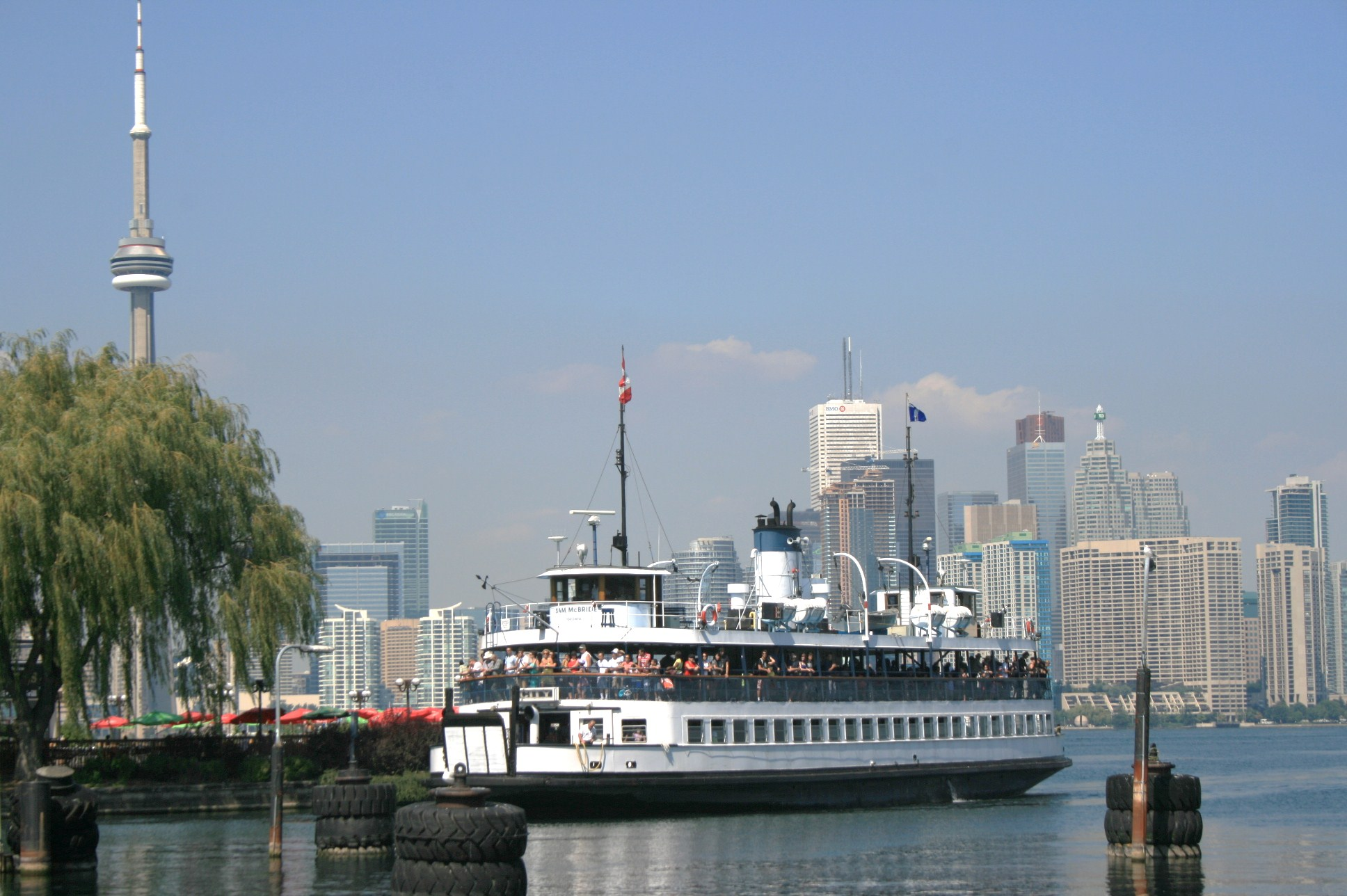
- Sam McBride at Centre Island dock in 2009

History
- Name: Sam McBride
- Namesake: Sam McBride, 41st Mayor of Toronto
- Owner: City of Toronto government
- Operator: Toronto Parks, Forestry and Recreation Division
- Port of registry: Toronto, Canada
- Builder: Toronto Drydock Co. Ltd., Toronto
- In service: 1939

General characteristics
- Tonnage: 387 t
- Length: 36.9 m
- Beam: 10.24m
- Depth: 3.36m
- Decks: 2
- Capacity: 915 passengers
- Crew: 13

Sam McBride is a Toronto Island ferry operated by the Parks, Forestry and Recreation Division of the City of Toronto government. The ferry serves the Toronto Islands from a dock at Jack Layton Ferry Terminal in downtown Toronto, Ontario, Canada.

== Construction ==
The ferry was commissioned in 1939, built by Toronto Dry Dock Ltd. Her namesake was a former Alderman and Mayor, who had been the founding chairman of the Toronto Transportation Commission, which at the time the ferry was built, ran the ferries to the island.

Prior to an accident in 2022, the ferry operated with a crew of six consisting of a marine captain and mate in the wheelhouse, an engineer in the engine room and three deckhands on deck. After the accident, Transport Canada increased the crew requirements from six to 13 so that the ferry crew would be better able to assist passengers on a crowded ferry in case an evacuation became necessary.

== Operational history ==
On June 20, 1941, a Norwegian Northrop N-3PB seaplane clipped the second deck of the ferry. The plane was destroyed after hitting the waters, and the two crew members, Instructor Lieutenant Finn Strand Kjos and student pilot Tron Harsvik, on board were killed. Damage was sustained to upper deck and later repaired.

She was transferred from the TTC to Metro Parks and Culture department in 1962 (and by Toronto Parks, Forestry and Recreation Division since 1998).

The ship was dry docked in 1973 to replace her engines.

In October 2012, Toronto City Council decided that funds should be set aside to replace Sam McBride and her two fleet-mates, Thomas Rennie and William Inglis with new vessels.

In 2019, there were two incidents where a throttle malfunction prevented the engines from being put into reverse. The ability to put the engines into reverse is needed to slow and stop the ferry as the ferry has no other braking mechanism. With a throttle malfunction, the ferry can still be steered. There were no injuries from either incident, but the ferry was temporarily pulled from service for repairs and testing.

Shortly after 5 PM on August 20, 2022 the ferry hit the mainland dock resulting in 12 passengers requiring medical attention and a suspension of ferry service to the islands for the rest of the day. There were 912 passengers and 6 crew members on board the ferry at the time of the collision. The Transportation Safety Board of Canada said it would investigate the crash. After two days in dock for inspection, Transport Canada cleared the ferry to go back into service. The suspected cause incident was a throttle malfunction affecting both the bow and stern main engines, that prevented the ferry from stopping; however, the TSB could not replicate this problem. Instead, in an August 2024 report, the TSB gave speed as the suspected cause; the ferry was travelling at 5 knots (9.3 km/h; 5.8 mph) instead of the normal 3 knots (5.6 km/h; 3.5 mph) as it approached the docks. The TSB recommended a crew of 13 instead of the six as then used so that the crew would be better able to assist passengers if an evacuation were needed.

On September 1, 2022, the Sam McBride suffered another throttle malfunction while docking; there were no passenger injuries, but the ferry was again pulled from service. The problem was traced to a software issue. The ferry returned to service after testing.

== See also ==
- PS Trillium
- Ongiara
- Thomas Rennie
