= PS Trillium =

Canadian side wheel ferry built in 1910

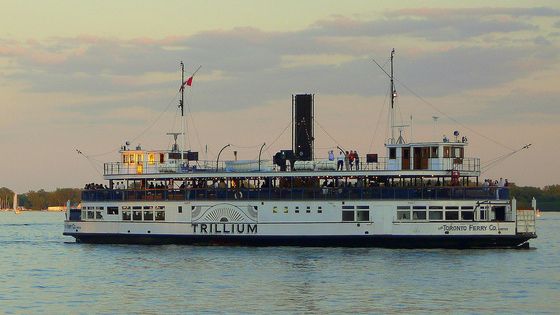

History

Canada
- Name: Trillium
- Owner: City of Toronto
- Operator: Parks, Forestry and Recreation
- Builder: Polson Iron Works, Toronto
- Christened: June 18, 1910
- In service: July 15, 1910
- Out of service: 1957
- Refit: 1974
- Reinstated: 1976
- Home port: Toronto, Ontario
- Status: In service

General characteristics
- Tonnage: Gross:672.82 Net:463.42
- Length: 150 feet (45.7 m)
- Beam: 30 feet (9.1 m)
- Depth: 8 feet (2.4 m)
- Installed power: Scotch boiler (original); Diesel (retrofitted)
- Propulsion: Side wheeler
- Capacity: 955 (originally 1,450)
- Notes: Polson Iron Works - Ship Builds, 1910

Trillium is a side wheeler ferry operated by the City of Toronto Parks, Forestry and Recreation, in Toronto, Ontario, Canada. Now 116 years old, she is one of several Toronto Island ferries operating between the Jack Layton Ferry Terminal at Bay Street and Queens Quay and three landing points on the Toronto Islands. She is the last sidewheel-propelled vessel on the Great Lakes.

== History ==
The ship was built in 1910 by Polson Iron Works at a cost of CA$75,000. The 1,450-capacity (reduced later to 995) ferry was built for and initially operated by the Toronto Ferry Company. She was launched on June 18, 1910, christened with a bottle of champagne by eight-year-old Phyllis Osler, granddaughter of politician Edmund Boyd Osler. The ferry entered service on July 1, 1910. Trillium's sister ship, Bluebell and other ferries Primrose and Mayflower in the company's fleet were also named after flowers.

In 1926, the City of Toronto acquired Trillium and the other ferries in the Toronto Ferry Company's fleet, and took over all ferry services. Nine boats and half-acre of land on Hanlan's Point was bought for CA$337,500. The ferry was remodelled by the Toronto Transit Commission, replacing worn woodwork and the main deck cabin, and removing the side gangways and officer daycabins.

Trillium was retired in 1957 and sold for CA$4,500 to the Toronto Works Department, which intended to use it to carry sewage sludge from the new Humber Sewage Treatment Plant. It was left to sink in a lagoon in the Toronto Islands, along with her sister vessel Bluebell. Unlike Bluebell, which was converted to a garbage scow, Trillium was left to deteriorate, its metal fittings stripped by scavengers and souvenir hunters.

In the sixties, there was renewed interest in the Trillium. First, in 1964, it was proposed to display the Trillium along with other historic boats at the Toronto Maritime Museum at the Exhibition grounds but the proposal failed. In 1965, it was then proposed to return the boat to service. Partly due to the advocacy of historian Mike Filey and Toronto Parks Commissioner Tommy Thompson, Metro Toronto approved her restoration in 1973. The restoration at a cost of CA$950,000 ($4.75 million in 2025 dollars), was chosen over building a new ferry which would have cost three to four million dollars.

Champion Engineering Ltd. supervised the restoration, which was done in Port Colborne, Ontario at the E. B. Magee drydock in Ramey's Bend. The restoration replaced the superstructure, boiler and deck. Original gauges and other 1910-era accessories were salvaged from Toronto Department of Public Works pumping stations. Other items were salvaged from the boats Imperial Windsor and Texaco Brave which were being scrapped. Several replicas were made of original parts, such as the brass bells and the beavers adorning the sides of the paddle boxes. The boat was rebuilt as close as possible to the original 1910 plans.

The ship returned to Toronto Harbour in November 1975. The ship was rechristened on June 18, 1976, 66 years after her first launch, the ceremony officiated by the same Phyllis Osler Aitken. She was returned to service on July 1, 1976, on runs to Hanlan's Point only, the other island ferry docks having been converted for the other ferries. This caused numerous complaints, notably Johnny Lombardi, who offered to get volunteers to rebuild the Centre Island docks in time for the annual CHIN picnic.

In 2017, Trillium was refurbished at a cost of CA$450,000. The refurbishment will extend its lifespan. The repairs included replacements to sections of the hull and rudder and three new coats of paint.

Incidents

In 1910, Trillium helped douse a fire on the harbourfront. Toronto Ferry Company owner Lol Solman operated the hose himself from the second level of Trillium to douse the flames at the Niagara dock.

In 1911, Trillium ran aground while on her return from a lacrosse match. The ferry Island Queen took off 600 passengers, then ran aground herself. Launches, sailboats, rowboats and canoes had to come to the rescue of the 2,000 stranded people. That year the water level of Lake Ontario was the lowest it had been since 1874.

On July 15, 1916 at 3pm, the Trillium was docking at Hanlan's Point dock to discharge passengers going to a baseball game. As it was docking, it created a side-wash that overcame and capsized a canoe being paddled by couple Sam Sniderman and Rose Ezrin nearby. By the time people could reach the scene, the couple had disappeared underwater and drowned. Their bodies were found within minutes but could not be revived.

Trillium collided with the former MS Normac in 1981. Normac, a former Great Lakes passenger vessel had been converted to Captain John's Harbour Boat Restaurant, and had been permanently moored in the Yonge Street slip since 1970. A mechanical failure caused Trillium to fail before colliding with the restaurant. The restaurant developed a slow leak, which caused her to sink two weeks later.

A 29-year-old man drowned after jumping off Trillium while attending the 1993 Caribana festival. He jumped off at 11 pm on July 29, telling friends that he would meet them on shore at Ontario Place. Trillium was about 300 feet (91 m) from shore. Police recovered his body on July 30. The victim's mother was hurt by speculation about his sobriety.

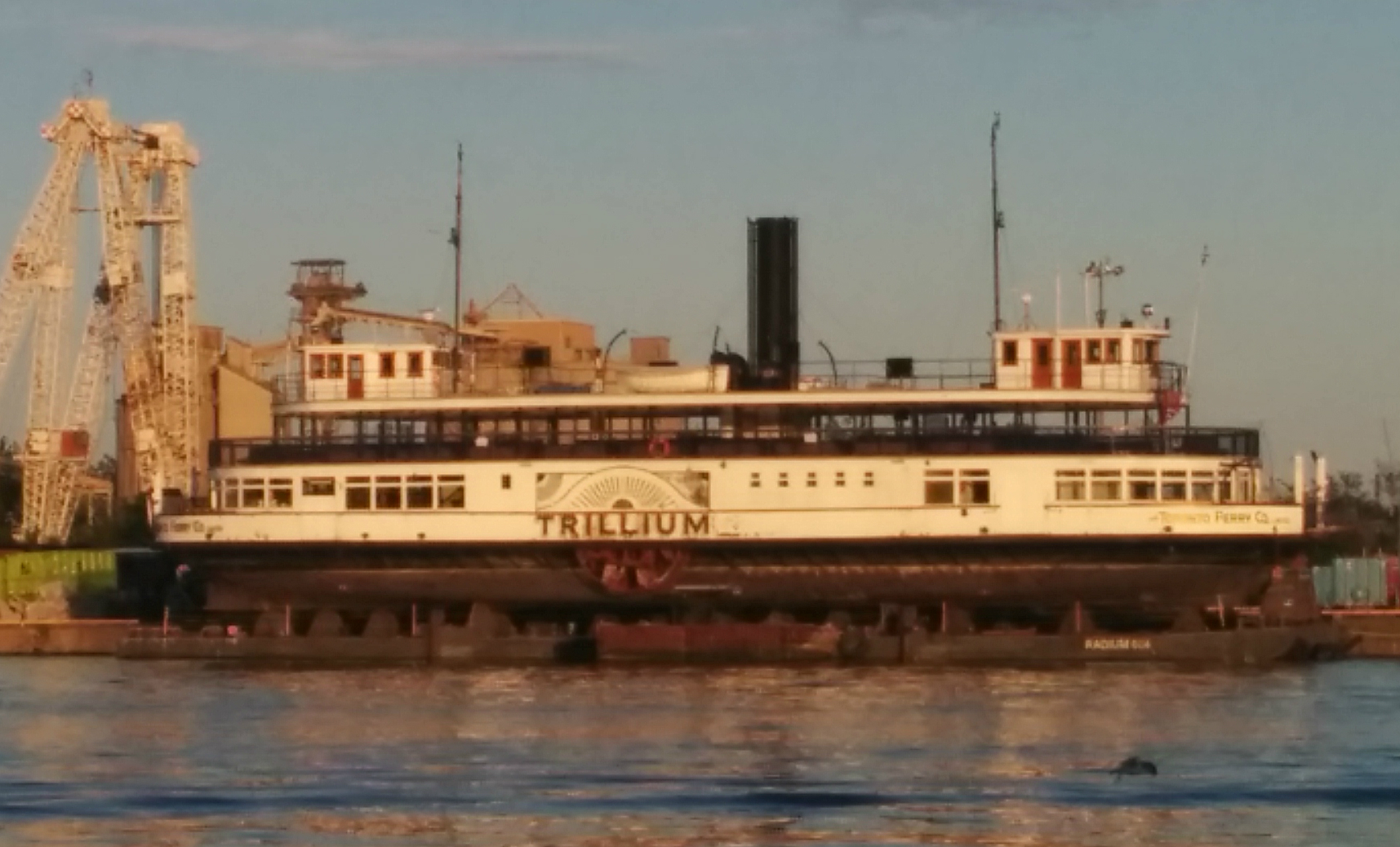
Trillium ferry in drydock in June 2017

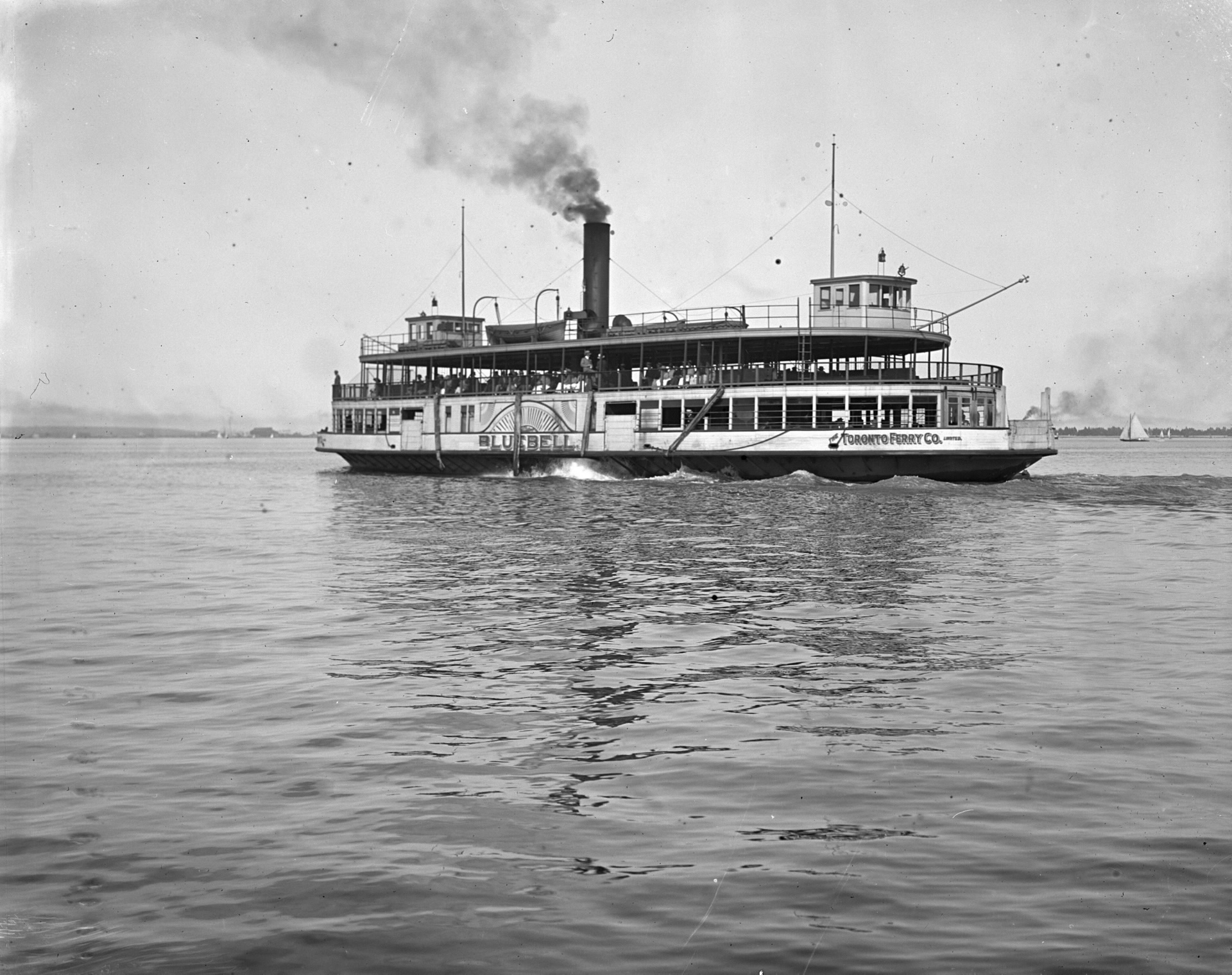
Bluebell Ferry in Toronto Harbour 1920

== See also ==
- Ongiara
- Sam McBride
- Thomas Rennie
- William Inglis
- Normac
