= Ongiara (ferry) =

Ferry operated by Toronto, Ontario, Canada

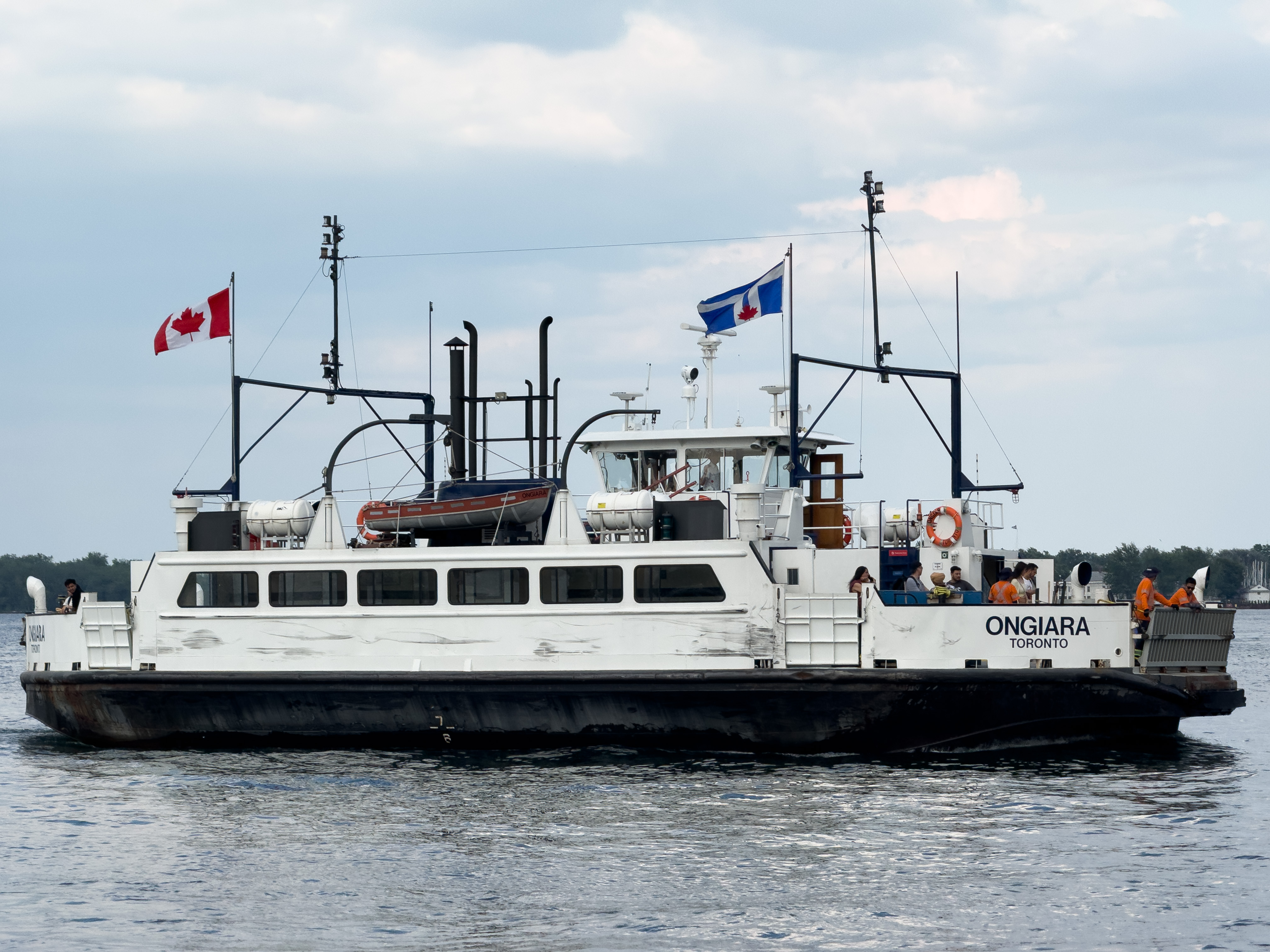
- Ongiara in 2025

History
- Name: Ongiara
- Owner: Toronto Parks, Forestry and Recreation Division, Toronto
- Operator: Toronto Parks, Forestry and Recreation Division
- Port of registry: (Canada) Toronto
- Builder: Russel Brothers, Owen Sound
- In service: 1963
- Status: In active service

General characteristics
- Type: Ferry
- Tonnage: 180 GRT, 122.05 NRT
- Length: 20.42 metres (67.0 ft)
- Beam: 11.0 metres (36.1 ft)
- Draft: 2.65 metres (8.7 ft)
- Decks: 2
- Installed power: 390 hp twin diesel
- Propulsion: Single screw
- Speed: 10 knots (12 mph)
- Capacity: 216 passengers; 10 cars or 8 (equivalent space) trucks

The Ongiara is a Toronto Island ferry operated by the Parks, Forestry and Recreation Division of the City of Toronto government. The ferry serves the Toronto Islands from a dock at Jack Layton Ferry Terminal in downtown Toronto, Ontario, Canada.

== History ==
The only car ferry operated by the City of Toronto (all others are owned by Ports Toronto) was built in Owen Sound, Ontario by Russel Brothers and commissioned in 1963 and carries both passengers (216) and vehicles (10 cars or 8 trucks). The latter is for City-owned vehicles that need to access the island.

Her namesake is believed to be from the Mohawk word Ongiara, for point of land cut into two. Ongiara was also the name of a former street on the Toronto Islands. Ontario band Great Lake Swimmers named their 2007 album Ongiara after the vessel.

== Operations ==
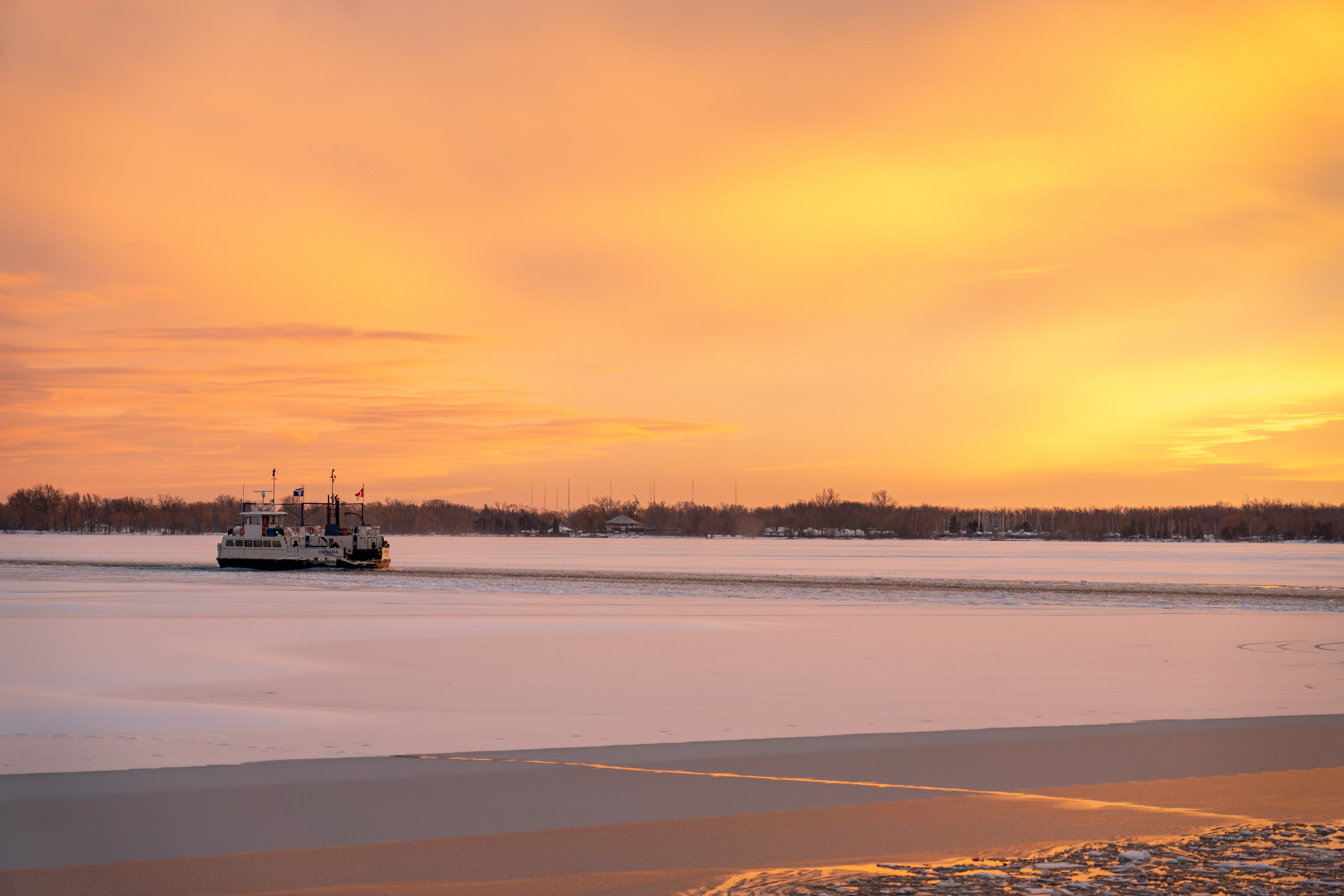
Ongiara in operation on a partially frozen Lake Ontario

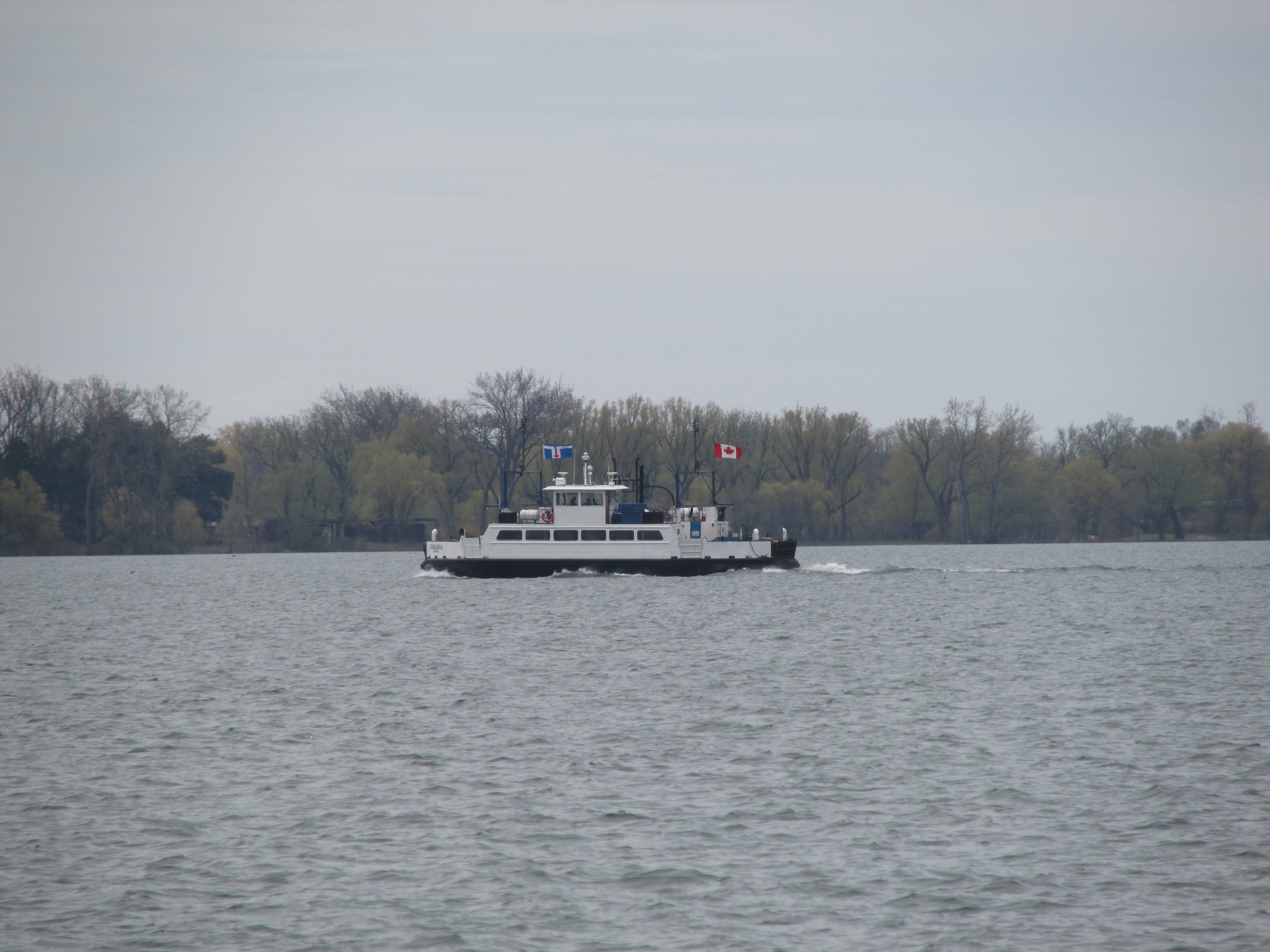
Ongiara in 2017

The Ongiara operates from the mainland ferry terminal over to Hanlan's Point and Wards Island terminals. The ferry can operate year-round as long as the inner harbour is ice free; it is the only ferry to operate in winter. Because of the Ongiara's small size, island residents are used to winds causing a hard docking.

During the 2010 G20 summit, for security reasons, the Ongiara did not carry passengers. Instead, a public passenger ferry was routed to Ward's Island to serve island residents. Service vehicles were routed to the Bathurst Street ferry, where Toronto Port Authority and Toronto Police would escort all vehicles through the airport to access the Islands.

== See also ==
- Ongiara (1885)
- Sam McBride
- Thomas Rennie
- Trillium
- William Inglis
