= Ongiara (1885) =

Canadian steamboat

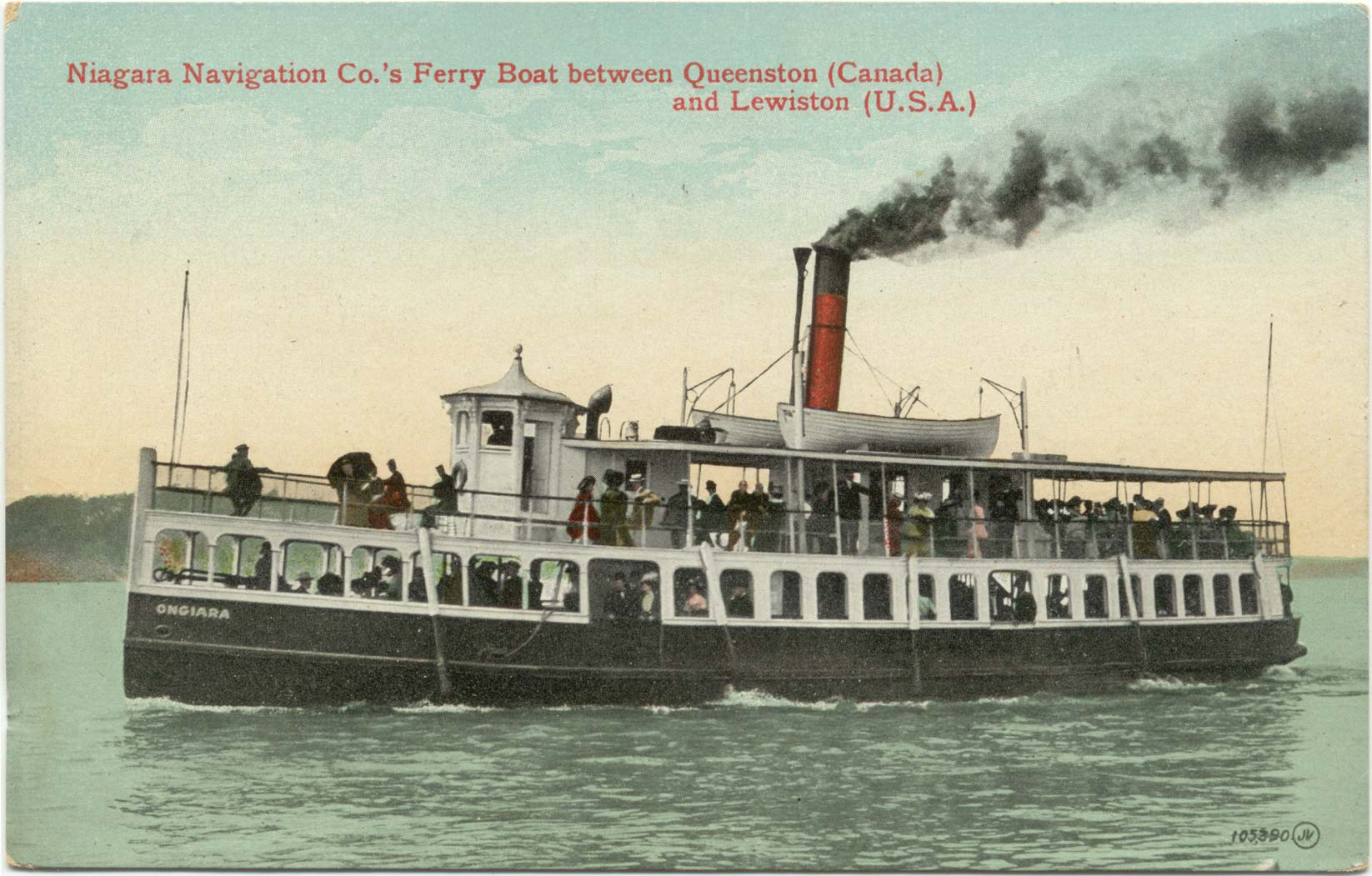
The Ongiara on the Niagara River.

The Ongiara was a steamboat that served most of her 33-year lifetime as a ferry on the Niagara River. She was built in Toronto by Melancthon Simpson, and commissioned in 1885 as the Queen City. In 1888 she was sold to the Niagara Transportation Company, which renamed her the Ongiara and started using her as a ferry passengers across the Niagara River, between Queenston, Ontario and Lewiston, New York. In 1912 she was sold and employed as a tow-boat in Toronto. Finally she was sunk off Bowmanville, Ontario in 1918.

== See also ==
- Ongiara (ferry boat)
