= TR series minesweeping trawler =

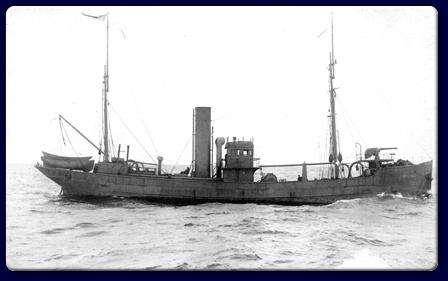
- TR 9

Class overview
- Operators: Royal Canadian Navy; United States Navy; Royal Navy; Kriegsmarine
- Built: 1917–1919
- In commission: 1917–1919
- Completed: 53

General characteristics
- Type: Naval trawler
- Displacement: 275 long tons (279 t)
- Length: 133 ft 10 in (40.8 m) oa; 125 ft 0 in (38.1 m) pp
- Beam: 23 ft 6 in (7.2 m)
- Draught: 13 ft 6 in (4.1 m)
- Propulsion: 1 shaft, steam triple expansion engine, 480 ihp (358 kW)
- Speed: 10 knots (19 km/h)
- Armament: 1 × QF 12-pounder (76 mm) gun

The TR series were minesweeping naval trawlers built during World War I. Ordered by the Royal Navy, they were loaned to the Royal Canadian Navy for seaward defence of the East Coast of Canada. The total number of vessels that entered service is unknown with 60 hulls constructed by eight Canadian shipyards. Based on the British Castle class, some entered service with the United States Navy during the war. Following World War I, they were sold for commercial use to replace the fishing vessels lost during the war. In World War II many of them were taken over by the Royal Navy as auxiliary minesweepers and two of them returned to the Royal Canadian Navy.

== Design and description ==
The TR series of minesweeping naval trawler were copies of the Royal Navy's Castle class. There were some changes in the Canadian version, including the gun being mounted further forward and a different lighting system. The TR series had a displacement of 275 long tons (279 t) with a length overall of 133 feet 10 inches (40.8 m) and a length between perpendiculars of 125 feet 0 inches (38.1 m), a beam of 23 feet 5 inches (7.1 m) and a draught of 13 feet 5 inches (4.1 m). The vessels were powered by a steam triple expansion engine driving one shaft creating 480 indicated horsepower (358 kW). They had a maximum speed of 10 knots (19 km/h) and were armed with one QF 12-pounder 12 cwt naval gun mounted forward. (Note: "Cwt" is the abbreviation for hundredweight, 12 cwt referring to the weight of the gun. QF stands for quick-firing gun.) A design flaw was later identified where the wireless operator was located in a cabin below the bridge and could not communicate easily with the commander of the vessel. This was rectified with the installation of an interphone.

== Service history ==
=== Construction and World War I ===
As late as October 1916, a memorandum created by the Royal Navy argued that naval trawlers were ineffective against the German submarine threat. However, in November, the British Admiralty demanded that Canada expand its East Coast patrol fleet with auxiliary trawlers. The Canadians acquired several fishing trawlers from the United States and converted them into auxiliary minesweeping vessels and ordered the twelve Battle-class trawlers of their own design from Canadian shipyards. In February 1917, the Admiralty initially ordered the construction of 36 naval trawlers from Canadian shipyards as part of a building programme intended to improve the state of seaward defence in Canadian waters.

The trawlers were constructed at shipyards along the Saint Lawrence River and in the Great Lakes. The crews of the vessels were sent inland from Halifax, Nova Scotia where they had trained. Twenty-two trawlers were constructed and sent to Quebec City to be completed and commissioned before the Saint Lawrence River froze over during the winter at the end of 1917. Once completed and commissioned, the vessels were then sent on to Sydney, Nova Scotia to join the East Coast patrol fleet. However, none of the vessels were completed in time to take part in the 1917 shipping season. This was due to construction delays as the American war effort, which had begun to pick up its pace, began to recruit Canadian workers. This caused work shortages at the Canadian yards. The majority of the trawlers that had arrived at Quebec City were laid up for the winter there, most requiring further work. The ice on the Saint Lawrence River prevented the trawlers from clearing the river until May 1918. In December 1917, the British government sought to expand the shipbuilding contracts in Canada. Alongside a large merchant ship construction programme, the Admiralty ordered a second batch of trawlers from Canadian shipyards. Designated Lot B, they were intended to be delivered by Fall 1918, but a shortage of labour, equipment and material led to delays. The steel required to construct boilers and hulls was delivered as late as August 1918.

Upon arrival, the trawlers were put to use in both minesweeping and patrol roles. In April 1918, four of the trawlers were used for port defence of Halifax and others were used to escort slow convoys through Canadian waters. In order to fill the manpower need for the trawlers, ratings from the Newfoundland division of the Royal Navy Reserve were sent to Canada. By mid-summer 35 of the 36 trawlers were active with the last, TR 20, awaiting her crew at Kingston, Ontario.

In August 1918, the German submarine U-156 attacked and sank the tanker Luz Blanca near Halifax. TR 11 and a drifter were the first vessels sent to respond to the sinking. Several other trawlers later joined in on the hunt for the submarine. However, the submarine escaped. Following the attack, the available trawler force was evenly dispersed among the major ports in Nova Scotia of Sydney and Halifax. However, many of the trawlers lacked armament or were defective and the actual numbers of available vessels was much reduced. Later that month, U-156 captured the fishing trawler Triumph and set about sinking vessels of the East Coast fishing fleet, using Triumph to get near their unsuspecting victims. On 21 August, a Canadian patrol unit that included the trawlers TR 22 and TR 32 came upon the U-boat. However, due to signals by one of the senior commanders, the Canadian patrol unit allowed the submarine to escape. The trawlers remained in service until war's end when they were decommissioned and laid up.

=== Interwar and World War II ===
TR 37, TR 39, TR 51, TR 55, TR 56, TR 58, TR 59 and TR 60 were all loaned to the United States Navy from November 1918 to August 1919. Following the war, many of the TR series were sold for commercial use in the fishing industry, to make up for losses during the war. 17 were sold to the Boston Deep Sea Fishing and Ice Company. One, TR 4, renamed Cartagena, was resold to the Brazilian Ministry of Marine. However, while being delivered to Rio de Janeiro, the vessel sank in rough weather after last being seen on 15 January 1928. Another, TR 14, renamed Pasages, wrecked along the coast of the Isle of Man in 1931.

In World War II, many of these vessels returned to naval service as auxiliary minesweepers in the Royal Navy. Two of them returned to Royal Canadian Navy service as the examination vessels Andrée Dupré and Macsin, in service at Halifax during World War II.

== List of vessels ==
TR series construction data
| Name | Builder | Laid down | Launched | Completed | Fate |
|---|---|---|---|---|---|
| TR 1 | Port Arthur Shipbuilding, Port Arthur, Ontario | 31 May 1917 | September 1917 | 17 October 1917 | The vessel was returned to the Royal Navy following the war. Sold in 1926 to the Royal New Zealand Navy, the vessel was renamed Wakakura and served in World War II. The vessel was broken up in 1952. |
| TR 2 | Port Arthur Shipbuilding, Port Arthur, Ontario | —N/a | —N/a | 21 November 1917 | Returned to Royal Navy following the war. Sold and renamed Cobarribas in 1920. |
| TR 3 | Port Arthur Shipbuilding, Port Arthur, Ontario | —N/a | —N/a | 16 May 1918 | Returned to Royal Navy following the war. Sold and renamed Guaymas in 1920. |
| TR 4 | Port Arthur Shipbuilding, Port Arthur, Ontario | —N/a | —N/a | 24 May 1918 | Returned to Royal Navy following the war. Sold and renamed Cartagena in 1926. Sank in bad weather on 15 January 1928. |
| TR 5 | Port Arthur Shipbuilding, Port Arthur, Ontario | —N/a | —N/a | 30 May 1918 | Returned to Royal Navy following the war. Sold and renamed Commandante Lorretti in 1919. |
| TR 6 | Port Arthur Shipbuilding, Port Arthur, Ontario | —N/a | —N/a | 27 May 1918 | Returned to Royal Navy following the war. Sold and renamed Mazatlan in 1920. |
| TR 7 | Collingwood Shipbuilding, Collingwood, Ontario | —N/a | —N/a | 27 May 1918 | Returned to Royal Navy following the war. Sold and renamed Santander in 1926. |
| TR 8 | Collingwood Shipbuilding, Collingwood, Ontario | —N/a | —N/a | 26 June 1918 | Returned to Royal Navy following the war. Sold and renamed Bonthorpe in 1920. (Note: Vessel's postwar attribution in doubt by source. Postwar history could be for TR 8, TR 9 or TR 10) |
| TR 9 | Collingwood Shipbuilding, Collingwood, Ontario | —N/a | —N/a | 26 June 1918 | Returned to Royal Navy following the war. Sold and renamed Somersby in 1920. (Note: Vessel's postwar attribution in doubt by source. Postwar history could be for TR 8, TR 9 or TR 10) |
| TR 10 | Collingwood Shipbuilding, Collingwood, Ontario | —N/a | —N/a | 16 May 1918 | Returned to Royal Navy following the war. Sold and renamed Vera Cruz in 1920. |
| TR 11 | Collingwood Shipbuilding, Collingwood, Ontario | —N/a | —N/a | 28 June 1918 | Returned to Royal Navy following the war. Sold and renamed San Sebastian in 1926. |
| TR 12 | Collingwood Shipbuilding, Collingwood, Ontario | —N/a | —N/a | 25 August 1918 | Returned to Royal Navy following the war. Sold 1920. |
| TR 13 | Thor Iron Works, Toronto, Ontario | —N/a | —N/a | 15 June 1918 | Returned to Royal Navy following the war. Sold and renamed Malaga in 1926. |
| TR 14 | Thor Iron Works, Toronto, Ontario | —N/a | —N/a | 10 June 1918 | Returned to Royal Navy following the war. Sold and renamed Pasages in 1926. Wrecked on the Isle of Man in 1931. |
| TR 15 | Polson Iron Works, Toronto, Ontario | —N/a | —N/a | 21 June 1918 | Returned to Royal Navy following the war. Sold and renamed Jacqueline in 1920. |
| TR 16 | Polson Iron Works, Toronto, Ontario | —N/a | —N/a | 22 June 1918 | Returned to Royal Navy following the war. Sold and renamed Salinas in 1920. |
| TR 17 | Polson Iron Works, Toronto, Ontario | —N/a | —N/a | 28 August 1918 | Returned to Royal Navy following the war. Sold and renamed Jeanne in 1920. |
| TR 18 | Polson Iron Works, Toronto, Ontario | —N/a | —N/a | 1 August 1918 | Returned to Royal Navy following the war. Sold and renamed Marie Louise in 1921. |
| TR 19 | Kingston Shipbuilding, Kingston, Ontario | —N/a | —N/a | 25 August 1918 | Returned to Royal Navy following the war. Sold and renamed Almeria and then Goolgwai in 1926. |
| TR 20 | Kingston Shipbuilding, Kingston, Ontario | —N/a | —N/a | 31 August 1918 | Returned to Royal Navy following the war. Sold and renamed Seville and then Durraween in 1926. |
| TR 21 | Canadian Vickers, Montreal, Quebec | —N/a | —N/a | 31 May 1918 | Returned to Royal Navy following the war. Sold and renamed Sacip in 1921. In 1935, the vessel was renamed Le Testerain and then Sacip I. |
| TR 22 | Canadian Vickers, Montreal, Quebec | —N/a | —N/a | 21 May 1918 | Returned to Royal Navy following the war. Sold and renamed Marie-Evelyne in 1920. (Note: The attribution for this ship is uncertain. This information could be associated with either TR 22 or TR 26 according to the Miramar Ship Index) |
| TR 23 | Canadian Vickers, Montreal, Quebec | —N/a | —N/a | 1 August 1918 | Returned to Royal Navy following the war. Sold and renamed Fontenay in 1926. |
| TR 24 | Canadian Vickers, Montreal, Quebec | —N/a | —N/a | 16 November 1917 | Returned to Royal Navy following the war. Sold and renamed Gosse in 1920. |
| TR 25 | Canadian Vickers, Montreal, Quebec | —N/a | —N/a | 1 June 1918 | Returned to Royal Navy following the war. Sold and renamed Yvonne Claude in 1920. |
| TR 26 | Canadian Vickers, Montreal, Quebec | —N/a | —N/a | 22 May 1918 | Returned to Royal Navy following the war. Sold 1920. (Note: The information of TR 22 and TR 26 is uncertain according to the Miramar Ship Index) |
| TR 27 | Canadian Vickers, Montreal, Quebec | —N/a | —N/a | 17 May 1918 | Returned to Royal Navy following the war. Sold and renamed Galopin in 1920. Renamed M.4403 in 1941 during World War II, the vessel was sunk by gunfire on 23 August 1944. |
| TR 28 | Canadian Vickers, Montreal, Quebec | —N/a | —N/a | 30 May 1918 | Returned to Royal Navy following the war. Sold and renamed Wellvale in 1926. |
| TR 29 | Canadian Vickers, Montreal, Quebec | —N/a | —N/a | 30 May 1918 | Returned to Royal Navy following the war. Sold and renamed Fernando de C. in 1920. |
| TR 30 | Canadian Vickers, Montreal, Quebec | —N/a | —N/a | 28 May 1918 | Returned to Royal Navy following the war. Sold and renamed Blanca de C. in 1920. Rebuilt as a cargo ship in 1958 and renamed Teruca in 1963. The vessel was broken up in Spain in 1987. (Note: The vessel's dimensions as a cargo ship were 143 ft 4 in (43.7 m) long with a beam of 23 ft 7 in (7.2 m)) |
| TR 31 | Canadian Vickers, Montreal, Quebec | —N/a | —N/a | 20 May 1918 | Returned to Royal Navy following the war. Sold and renamed Jose Ignacio de C. in 1920. |
| TR 32 | Government Shipyards, Sorel, Quebec | —N/a | —N/a | 16 May 1918 | Returned to Royal Navy following the war. Sold and renamed Authorpe in 1926. |
| TR 33 | Government Shipyards, Sorel, Quebec | —N/a | —N/a | 4 June 1918 | Returned to Royal Navy following the war. Sold and renamed Windroos in 1927. |
| TR 34 | Government Shipyards, Sorel, Quebec | —N/a | —N/a | 28 July 1918 | Returned to Royal Navy following the war. Sold and renamed Valentia in 1919. The trawler was renamed Etoile du Nord in 1928. The vessel lengthened in 1933. During World War II, Etoile du Nord was mined off Dunkirk on 25 May 1940. (Note: The vessel was lengthened to 133 ft 2 in (40.6 m) and was 317 GRT.) |
| TR 35 | Davie Shipbuilding, Lauzon, Quebec | —N/a | April 1918 | 5 June 1918 | Returned to Royal Navy following the war. Sold and renamed Tampico in 1920. |
| TR 36 | Davie Shipbuilding, Lauzon, Quebec | —N/a | May 1918 | 5 June 1918 | Returned to Royal Navy following the war. Sold and renamed Ferrol in 1926. |
| TR 37 | Port Arthur Shipbuilding, Port Arthur, Ontario | —N/a | —N/a | 1 November 1918 | Transferred to the United States Navy and renamed CT.37. Returned to Royal Navy, resuming former name in August 1919. Sold and renamed Their Merit in 1925. The vessel was driven ashore on 31 January 1930 at Berehaven. Repaired and returned to sea. In August 1939, the vessel was requisitioned by the Royal Navy and given the pennant number FY 552. At the end of the war, the vessel was returned to its owners in November 1945. Operated out of Milford and was sold in 1956 and renamed Merchant Victor. The ship was sold for scrap in 1959. |
| TR 38 | Port Arthur Shipbuilding, Port Arthur, Ontario | —N/a | —N/a | 5 June 1918 | Returned to Royal Navy following the war. Sold and renamed Alcatraz in 1920. |
| TR 39 | Port Arthur Shipbuilding, Port Arthur, Ontario | —N/a | —N/a | 1 November 1918 | Transferred to the United States Navy and renamed CT.39. Returned to Royal Navy, resuming former name in August 1919. Sold and renamed Chandbali in 1930. In 1932, the vessel was converted to a cargo ship and lengthened. The ship was broken up in India in 1986. (Note: Dimensions following 1932 conversion; 145 ft 4 in (44.3 m), 362 GRT) |
| TR 40 | Port Arthur Shipbuilding, Port Arthur, Ontario | —N/a | —N/a | 1 November 1918 | Transferred to the United States Navy and renamed CT.40. Returned to Royal Navy, resuming former name in August 1919. Sold and renamed Marie Yette in 1921. |
| TR 41 | Port Arthur Shipbuilding, Port Arthur, Ontario | —N/a | —N/a | 5 May 1919 | Returned to Royal Navy following the war. Sold and renamed Marie Simone in 1920. Renamed V.729 after being taken over by Germany in 1940 during World War II. The ship was sunk by gunfire at the Battle of Audierne Bay on 23 August 1944. |
| TR 42 | Port Arthur Shipbuilding, Port Arthur, Ontario | —N/a | —N/a | 5 May 1919 | Returned to Royal Navy following the war. Sold and renamed Marie-Gilberte in 1920. |
| TR 43 | Port Arthur Shipbuilding, Port Arthur, Ontario | —N/a | —N/a | 12 May 1919 | Returned to Royal Navy following the war. Sold and renamed Marie Anne in 1920. |
| TR 44 | Port Arthur Shipbuilding, Port Arthur, Ontario | —N/a | —N/a | 12 May 1919 | Returned to Royal Navy following the war. Sold and renamed Florencia in 1920. |
| TR 45 | Davie Shipbuilding, Lauzon, Quebec | —N/a | April 1919 | 12 May 1919 | Returned to Royal Navy following the war. Converted to cargo ship in 1919. Sold and renamed Labrador in 1920. Renamed Mardep in 1930 and Bernier in 1935. The vessel was wrecked off Labrador in August 1965. |
| TR 46 | Davie Shipbuilding, Lauzon, Quebec | —N/a | —N/a | 12 May 1919 | Returned to Royal Navy following the war. Sold and renamed Algoa Bay in 1926. |
| TR 47 | Davie Shipbuilding, Lauzon, Quebec | —N/a | —N/a | 12 May 1919 | Returned to Royal Navy following the war. Sold and renamed Heron in 1919. |
| TR 48 | Davie Shipbuilding, Lauzon, Quebec | —N/a | —N/a | 12 May 1919 | Returned to Royal Navy following the war. Sold and was successively renamed Dragon Vert, Miquelon and Korab IV in 1919. In 1942 the vessel was renamed Elbing and returned to the name Miquelon in 1945. The ship was broken up in 1952. |
| TR 49 | Davie Shipbuilding, Lauzon, Quebec | —N/a | —N/a | 12 May 1919 | Returned to Royal Navy following the war. Sold and renamed Joselle in 1919. |
| TR 50 | Davie Shipbuilding, Lauzon, Quebec | —N/a | —N/a | 12 May 1919 | Returned to Royal Navy following the war. Sold and renamed Colonel Rockwell in 1920. |
| TR 51 | Government Shipyards, Sorel, Quebec | —N/a | —N/a | 20 November 1918 | Transferred to the United States Navy and renamed CT.51. Returned to Royal Navy, resuming former name in August 1919. Sold and renamed Marie Caroline in 1919. |
| TR 52 | Government Shipyards, Sorel, Quebec | —N/a | —N/a | November 1918 | Transferred to United States Navy. Returned to Royal Navy in August 1919 resuming former name. Sold and renamed Marie-Mad in 1919. The vessel was mined and sunk off Ajaccio on 23 November 1943. |
| TR 53 | Government Shipyards, Sorel, Quebec | —N/a | —N/a | November 1918 | Returned to Royal Navy following the war. Sold and renamed Marie Therese in 1920. The vessel was taken over by Germany during World War II and renamed M.4204. The vessel was attacked and sunk by aircraft near La Pallice, France on 12 August 1944. |
| TR 54 | Kingston Shipbuilding, Kingston, Ontario | —N/a | —N/a | 30 September 1918 | Returned to Royal Navy following the war. Sold and renamed Table Bay in 1925. |
| TR 55 | Kingston Shipbuilding, Kingston, Ontario | —N/a | —N/a | 8 November 1918 | Transferred to the United States Navy and renamed CT.55. Returned to Royal Navy, resuming former name in August 1919. Sold and renamed Marie Jacqueline in 1920. |
| TR 56 | Kingston Shipbuilding, Kingston, Ontario | —N/a | —N/a | 22 November 1918 | Transferred to the United States Navy and renamed CT.56. Returned to Royal Navy, resuming former name in August 1919. Sold and renamed Romanita in 1921. |
| TR 57 | Kingston Shipbuilding, Kingston, Ontario | —N/a | —N/a | October 1919 | Returned to Royal Navy following the war. Sold and converted to cargo ship. Renamed Col. Roosevelt in 1920 and Texas in 1926. The ship sank in a collision off Jamaica on 19 July 1944. |
| TR 58 | Tidewater Shipbuilding, Trois-Rivières, Quebec | —N/a | —N/a | 21 November 1918 | Transferred to the United States Navy and renamed CT.58. Returned to Royal Navy in August 1919. The vessel was wrecked in Barra Sound on 20 November 1920. |
| TR 59 | Tidewater Shipbuilding, Trois-Rivières, Quebec | —N/a | —N/a | 21 November 1918 | Transferred to the United States Navy and renamed CT.59. Returned to Royal Navy, resuming former name August 1919. Sold and renamed Pilote Gironde I in 1920. Captured by Germans in 1940. Commissioned into Kriegsmarine as FB 07 in July 1942 and renamed V 1517 later that year. In November 1943, the vessel was renamed M 3854 and surrendered to the Allies in 1945. The vessel was later sold, but final fate unknown. |
| TR 60 | Tidewater Shipbuilding, Trois-Rivières, Quebec | —N/a | —N/a | 25 November 1918 | Transferred to the United States Navy and renamed CT.60. Returned to Royal Navy, resuming former name in August 1919. Sold and renamed David Haigh in 1919. |
