= HMCS Armentières =

Battle-class naval trawlers

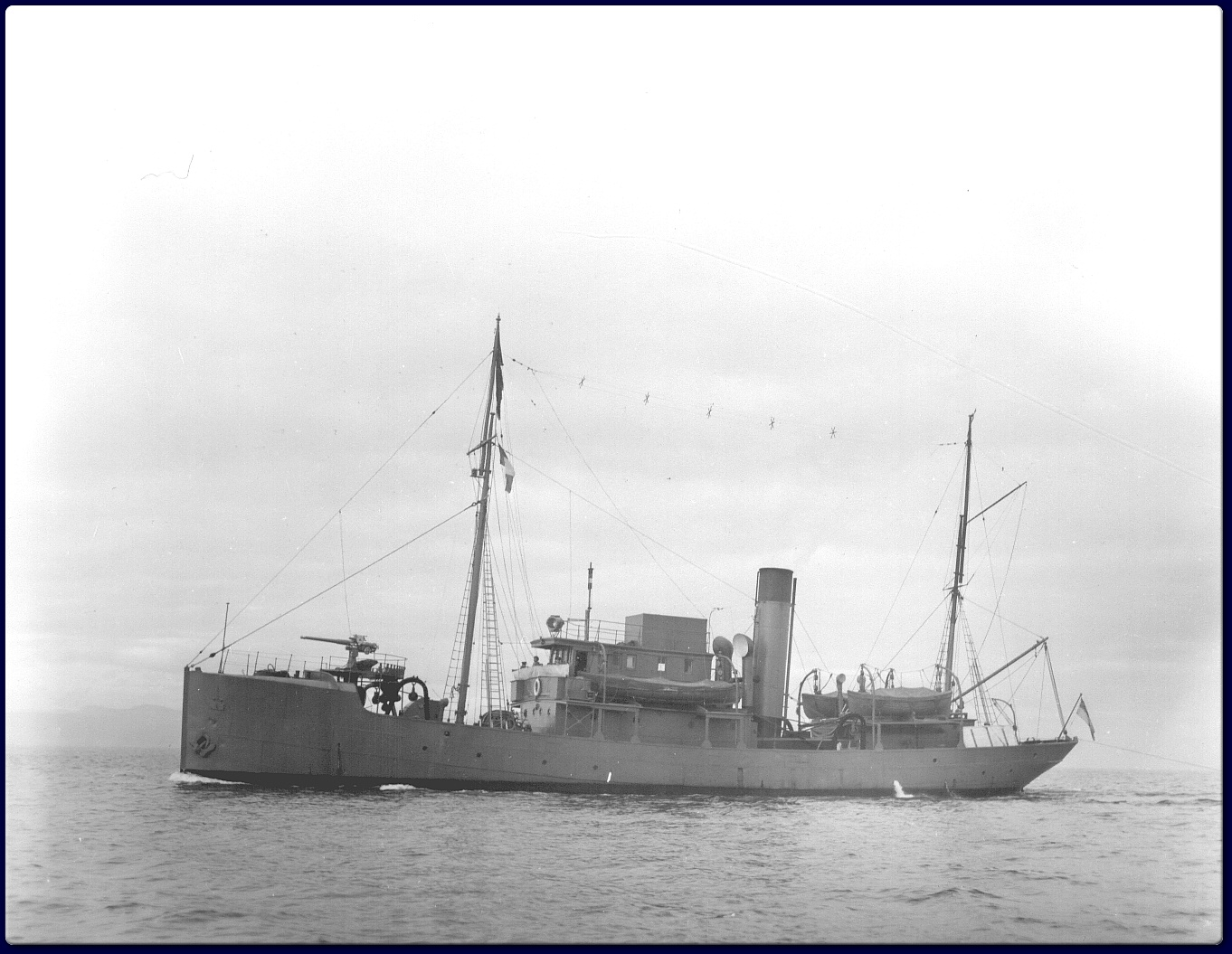
- HMCS Armentières on 9 December 1940

History

Canada
- Name: Armentières
- Namesake: Battle of Armentières
- Builder: Canadian Vickers, Montreal
- Launched: 11 August 1917
- Commissioned: 5 June 1918
- Decommissioned: 28 October 1919
- Recommissioned: 1923
- Decommissioned: 1946
- Fate: Sold to Coastal Towing Company, 1946
- Renamed: A.G. Garrish (1947–1958); Arctic Rover (1958–1962); Laforce (1962–1973); Polaris (1973)
- In service: 1947
- Out of service: 1973
- Fate: Registry deleted 1991

General characteristics
- Class & type: Battle-class naval trawler
- Displacement: 357 long tons (363 t)
- Length: 130 ft (40 m)
- Beam: 25 ft (7.6 m)
- Draught: 13 ft (4.0 m)
- Propulsion: Single screw steam triple expansion, 480 ihp (360 kW)
- Speed: 10 knots (19 km/h; 12 mph)
- Armament: 1 × QF 12-pounder 12 cwt naval gun

HMCS Armentières was one of twelve Battle-class naval trawlers used by the Royal Canadian Navy (RCN). Armentières entered service in 1918 near the end of the First World War on the Atlantic coast of Canada. Following the war, the ship was transferred to the Department of Marine and Fisheries for a short period before reverting to RCN service in 1923 on the Pacific coast of Canada. The ship sank in 1925, was raised and re-entered service, remaining with the fleet through the Second World War as an examination vessel at Prince Rupert, British Columbia. After the end of the war, the vessel entered mercantile service becoming A.G. Garrish in 1947, later renamed Arctic Rover in 1958, Laforce in 1962 and Polaris in 1973. The ship's registry was deleted in 1991.

== Design and description ==
The RCN's Battle-class trawlers formed part of the Canadian naval response to Admiralty warnings to Canada about the growing German U-boat threat to merchant shipping in the western Atlantic. Intended to augment anti-submarine patrols off Canada's east coast, these ships were modelled on contemporary British North Sea trawlers, since the standard types of Canadian fishing vessels were considered unsuitable for patrol work.

Twelve vessels were ordered on 2 February 1917 from two shipyards, Polson Iron Works of Toronto and Canadian Vickers of Montreal. Those vessels built at Canadian Vickers displaced 357 long tons (363 t) and were 130 feet (40 m) long overall with a beam of 25 feet (7.6 m) and a draught of 13 feet (4.0 m). The vessels were propelled by a steam-powered triple expansion engine driving one shaft creating 480 indicated horsepower (360 kW) giving the vessels a maximum speed of 10 knots (19 km/h; 12 mph).

All twelve trawlers were equipped with a QF 12-pounder 12 cwt naval gun mounted forward. (Note: "Cwt" is the abbreviation for hundredweight, 20 cwt referring to the weight of the gun.) This was considered to be the smallest gun that stood a chance of putting a surfaced U-boat out of action, and they also carried a small number of depth charges. The trawlers were named after battles of the Western Front during the First World War that Canadians had been involved in. They cost between $155,000 and $160,000 per vessel. (Note: Adjusted for inflation to 2026 dollars, $2,859,663 to $2,951,910) (Note: Tucker places the cost at $191,000 (adjusted for inflation to 2026 dollars, $3,523,843))

== Service history ==
Named after the Battle of Armentières, the trawler was built by Canadian Vickers at Montreal and launched on 11 August 1917. Intended for use during the 1917 shipping season, the construction of the vessels was delayed by the entry of the United States into the war. With higher wages found south of the border, a shortage of skilled labour developed in the shipyards, coupled with a shortage of construction material. The six vessels ordered from Canadian Vickers were delayed further by difficulty in providing engines for the trawlers. The hulls had been finished during Summer 1917. However, the engines did not arrive until the fall. The ship was commissioned on 5 June 1918.

Armentières sailed to the east coast where for the 1918 shipping season, all the Battle-class trawlers were assigned to patrol and escort duties based out of Sydney, Nova Scotia. Following the sinking of the merchant vessel Luz Blanca off Halifax, Nova Scotia, Armentières, St. Eloi and Festubert were tasked with hunting for the German submarine U-156, which had been operating off the coast of Nova Scotia. The Battle class was used for patrol and escort duties off the Atlantic coast of Canada until the end of the war.

Along with Givenchy, and Thiepval, Armentières accompanied Stadacona on a trip to the west coast via the Panama Canal in early 1919. Shortly after arriving at Esquimalt, British Columbia, Armentières was refitted to increase its utility as a training ship, with a captain's cabin built abaft the wheelhouse, and two cabins built below the upper deck. The ship was paid off from RCN service on 28 October 1919 and was transferred to the Department of Marine and Fisheries. The vessel was returned to the RCN and was recommissioned in 1923. On 2 September 1925 the ship sank in Pipestem Inlet, near Barkley Sound. The vessel was salvaged on 26 October Armentières was recommissioned again in 1926. Frequently functioning as a training ship for the Royal Canadian Naval Volunteer Reserve, Armentières also performed fisheries patrol duties, including the protection of migrating fur seals against illegal hunting. This enforcement of the North Pacific Fur Seal Convention of 1911 was often carried out in conjunction with sister ships Thiepval and CGS Givenchy, which at the time was serving with the Department of Marine and Fisheries. In the 1930s, Armentières also assisted with hydrographic survey and oceanographic work.

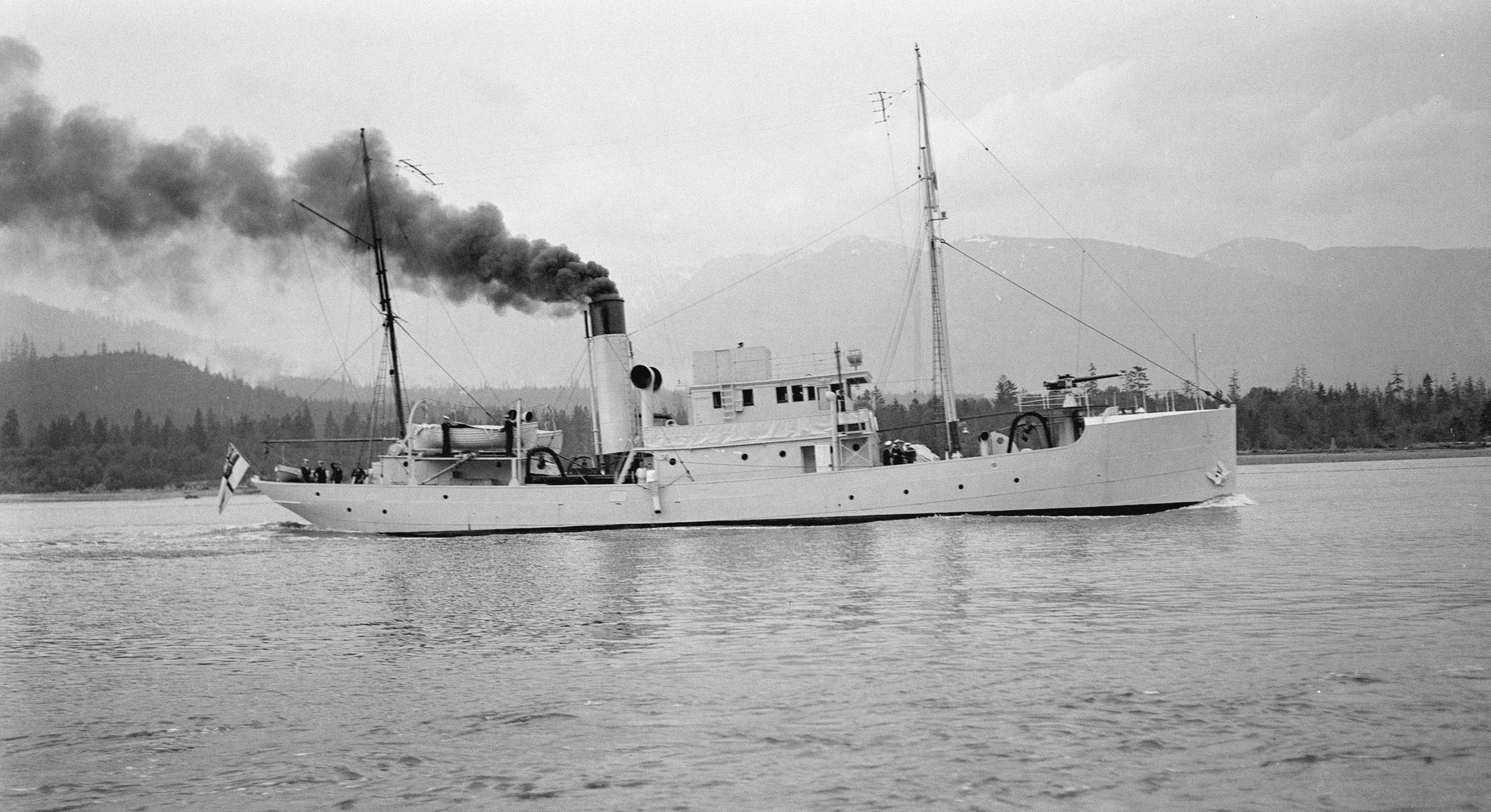
Armentières in 1933 at Vancouver

Armentières continued her service throughout the interwar years, and by 1934 was the only Battle-class trawler still actively serving with the RCN, although others would return to naval service in 1939. During much of the Second World War, Armentières served as an examination vessel and minesweeper at Prince Rupert, British Columbia. For minesweeping purposes, the aft part of the ship was trimmed.

Following the end of the war Armentières was paid off on 8 February 1946. Subsequently, sold as surplus, Armentières was purchased by the Coastal Towing Company of Vancouver on 8 February 1946, who renamed her A.G. Garrish, installed a new Yarrow boiler, and made changes to adapt the ship for towing log rafts and scows. The vessel was sold to Andys Bay Industries in 1954, keeping the same name. In 1958, the ship was sold again, this time to Arctic Shipping Limited and renamed Arctic Rover. It served partially in the Western Arctic Ocean of the Northwest Territories, Canada. In 1962, the vessel was purchased by Vancouver Tug Boat Company and renamed Laforce. In 1972, the vessel was sold twice and renamed Polaris in 1973. Polaris was sold in 1975 to West Indies Metal Corp and her registry was deleted in 1991.
