= HMCS Ypres =

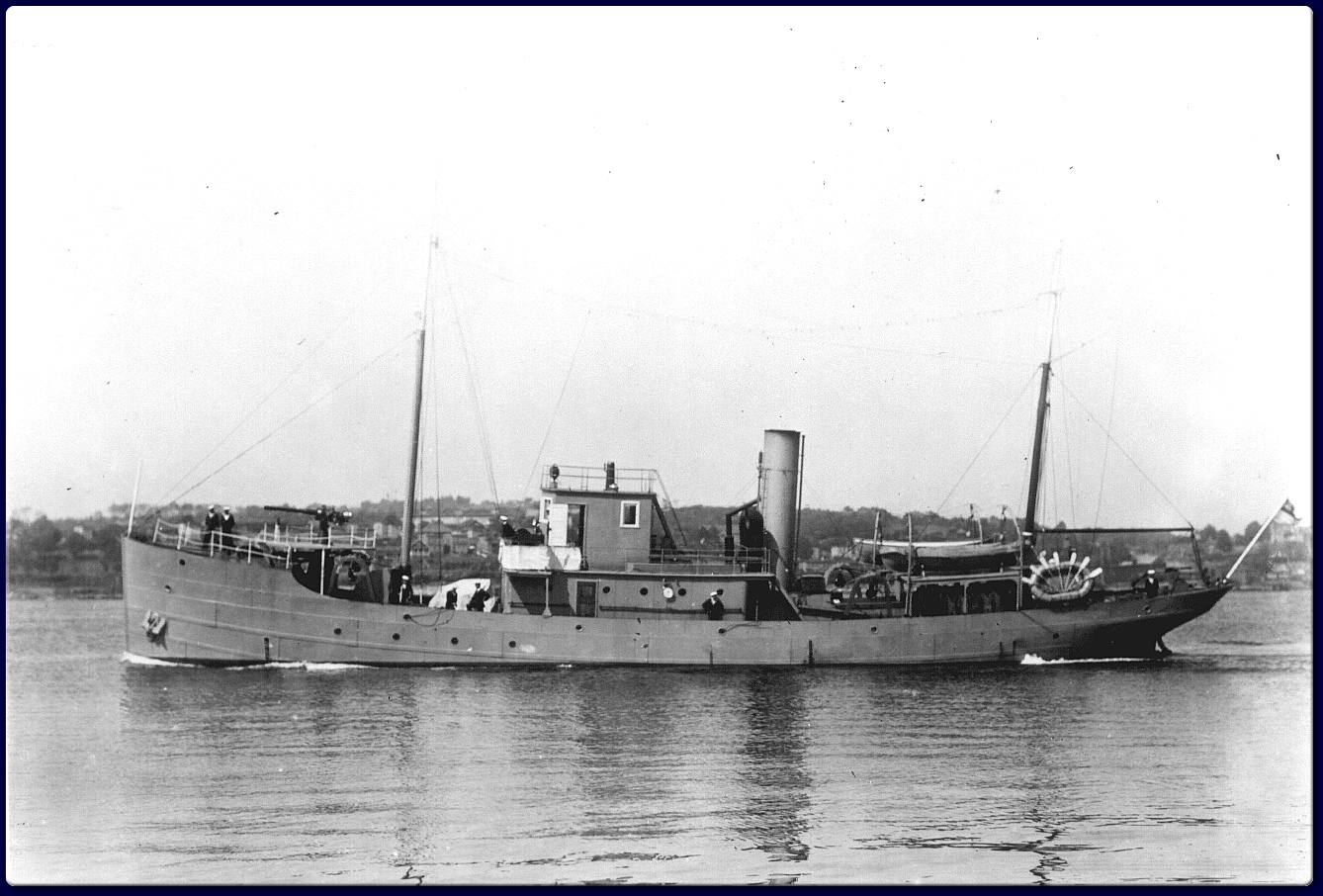
- Ypres in 1924

History

Canada
- Name: Ypres
- Namesake: Second and Third battles of Ypres
- Ordered: 2 February 1917
- Builder: Polson Iron Works Limited, Toronto
- Launched: 16 July 1917
- Commissioned: 10 November 1917
- Decommissioned: 1920
- Recommissioned: 1 May 1923
- Decommissioned: November 1932
- Recommissioned: 1938
- Fate: Rammed and sunk by HMS Revenge at Halifax, Nova Scotia, 12 May 1940

General characteristics
- Class & type: Battle-class naval trawler
- Displacement: 320 long tons (330 t)
- Length: 130 ft (40 m)
- Beam: 23 ft 5 in (7.14 m)
- Draught: 13 ft 5 in (4.09 m)
- Propulsion: 1 x triple expansion, 480 ihp (360 kW)
- Speed: 10 knots (12 mph; 19 km/h)
- Armament: 1 × QF 12-pounder 12 cwt naval gun

HMCS Ypres was one of twelve Battle-class naval trawlers constructed for and used by the Royal Canadian Navy (RCN) during the First World War. Named after the Second and Third battles of Ypres, the ship entered service in 1918, patrolling the east coast of Canada for submarine activity. Following the war, the ship remained in service with as a patrol and training ship. In 1938, the vessel recommissioned as a gate vessel, re-designated Gate Vessel 1, in service at Halifax, Nova Scotia. On 12 May 1940, the gate vessel was rammed and sunk in a collision with the British battleship HMS Revenge.

== Design and description ==
The RCN's Battle-class trawlers formed part of the Canadian naval response to Admiralty warnings to Canada about the growing German U-boat threat to merchant shipping in the western Atlantic. Intended to augment anti-submarine patrols off Canada's east coast, these ships were modelled on contemporary British North Sea trawlers, since the standard types of Canadian fishing vessels were considered unsuitable for patrol work.

Twelve vessels were ordered on 2 February 1917 from two shipyards, Polson Iron Works of Toronto and Canadian Vickers of Montreal. Those vessels built at Polson Iron Works displaced 320 long tons (330 t) and were 130 feet (40 m) long overall with a beam of 23 feet 5 inches (7.14 m) and a draught of 13 feet 5 inches (4.09 m). They were propelled by a steam-powered triple expansion engine driving one shaft creating 480 indicated horsepower (360 kW) giving the vessels a maximum speed of 10 knots (19 km/h; 12 mph).

All twelve trawlers were equipped with a QF 12-pounder 12 cwt naval gun mounted forward. (Note: "Cwt" is the abbreviation for hundredweight, 20 cwt referring to the weight of the gun.) This was considered to be the smallest gun that stood a chance of putting a surfaced U-boat out of action, and they also carried a small number of depth charges. The trawlers were named after battles of the Western Front during the First World War that Canadians had been involved in. They cost between $155,000 and $160,000 per vessel. (Note: Adjusted for inflation to 2026 dollars, $2,859,663 to $2,951,910) (Note: Tucker places the cost at $191,000 (adjusted for inflation to 2026 dollars, $3,523,843))

== Service history ==
Ypres was constructed by Polson Iron Works at Toronto and was launched on 16 June 1917. Intended for use during the 1917 shipping season, the construction of the vessels was delayed by the entry of the United States into the war. With higher wages found south of the border, a shortage of skilled labour developed in the shipyards, coupled with a shortage of construction material. The trawler was commissioned on 13 November 1917. Ypres sailed to Halifax following her commissioning for defence of the Atlantic coast of Canada. For the defence of shipping in Canadian waters in 1918, the entire Battle class was assigned to work out of Sydney, Nova Scotia.

The ship remained in Canadian service following the end of the war until being paid off in 1920. After being recommissioned on 1 May 1923 as a training ship on the east coast, having been re-designated a minesweeper in 1922. With sister ship Festubert, Ypres trained with the destroyers on the east coast until November 1932 she was again paid off and was placed in reserve. Refitted as a gate vessel in 1938 and recommissioned, Ypres, designated Gate Vessel 1, formed part of the Halifax boom defences until 12 May 1940, when she was rammed and sunk by the British battleship Revenge.

=== Sinking ===
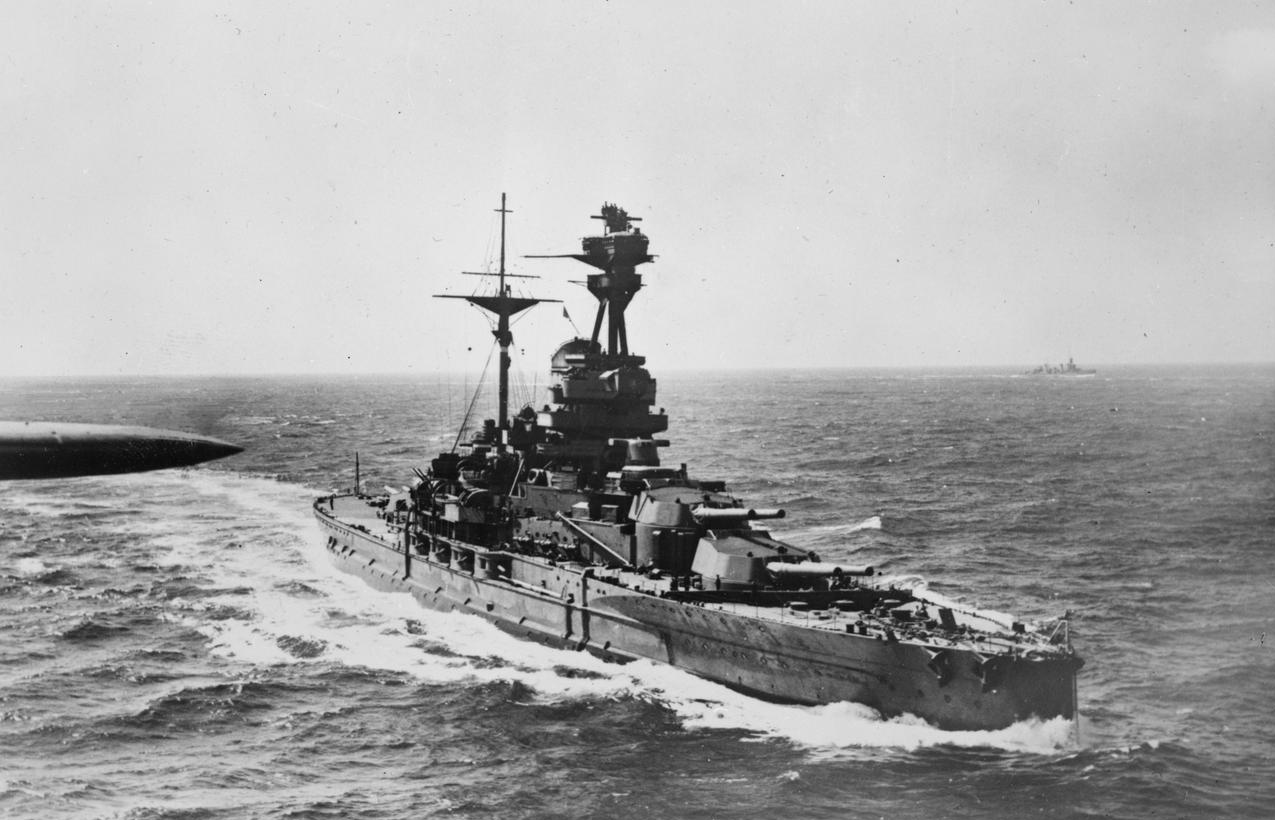
HMS Revenge underway at sea

The battleship was departing to escort two troop transports sailing for the United Kingdom when a request was made for the boom to be opened for her at 1830. Revenge began making her way towards the gate, which opened at 1826. However, before arriving at the gate, the battleship stopped inside the harbour, closer to the gate. The two troop transports had not joined up with the battleship on time and the officer in charge of gate operations did not inform the gate vessels of the change in departure time. When the ships finally did sail, the gate vessels had little time to get the gate open fully. Gate Vessel 1 reported the gate being open at 2055 and at 2056, Revenge rammed the gate vessel, rolling the trawler almost onto her side and flooding Gate Vessel 1 through her upper deck openings. The trawler, attached to the boom, bounced off the side of the battleship, which dragged the trawler and boom for roughly 500 yards (460 m) before the battleship came to a halt. Gate Vessel 1 was abandoned as the ship settled onto the boom and sank at roughly 2125. There was no loss of life in the collision, with Revenge collecting thirteen members of the crew and Gate Vessel 2 (sister Festubert) collecting five more sailors, one of them a member of Revenge's crew who had jumped overboard to save a Canadian. Revenge and her convoy sailed once ascertaining that there had been no deaths. Another Battle-class trawler, Arleux, assumed Ypres' position as Gate Vessel 1. After this incident, the crews of other gate vessels would pretend to make elaborate preparations for a collision every time Revenge visited Halifax.
