= Thiepval (disambiguation) =

Thiepval a commune in the Somme department, Hauts-de-France, France.

Thiepval may also refer to:

- Thiepval Barracks, headquarters of the British Army in Northern Ireland
- HMCS Thiepval, a 1917 sunken Canadian trawler
