= Battle class =

Battle class may refer to:

- Battle-class trawler, twelve naval trawlers operated by the Royal Canadian Navy between 1917 and 1946
- Battle-class destroyer, twenty-four destroyers operated by the Royal Navy from 1944 to the 1970s, plus two ships operated by the Royal Australian Navy from 1950 until 1974
