= HMCS Thiepval =

Coordinates: 48°54′4″N 125°19′40″W

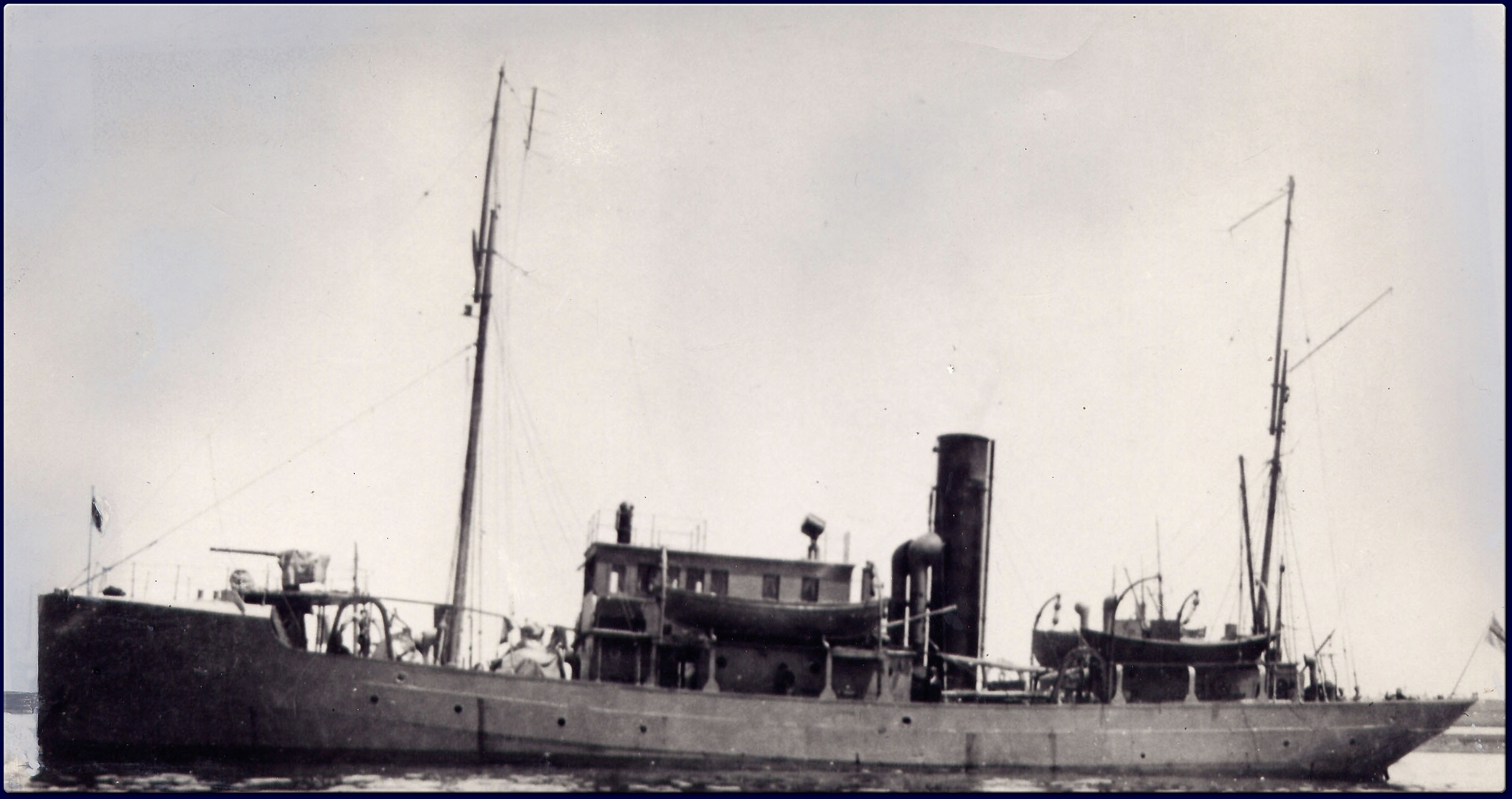
- HMCS Thiepval

History

Canada
- Name: Thiepval
- Namesake: Battle of Thiepval Ridge
- Builder: Kingston Shipbuilding Co., Kingston
- Launched: 1917
- Commissioned: 24 July 1918
- Decommissioned: 19 March 1920
- Recommissioned: 1 April 1923
- Fate: Sank 28 February 1930

General characteristics
- Class & type: Battle-class naval trawler
- Displacement: 357 long tons (363 t)
- Length: 130 ft (40 m)
- Beam: 25 ft (7.6 m)
- Draught: 13 ft (4.0 m)
- Speed: 10 knots (19 km/h; 12 mph)
- Armament: 1 × QF 12-pounder (76 mm (3 in)) 12 cwt gun

HMCS Thiepval was one of twelve Battle-class naval trawlers used by the Royal Canadian Navy (RCN). After seeing service on Canada's east coast at the end of the First World War, Thiepval was transferred to the west coast, where she spent the remainder of her career. In 1924, Thiepval visited the Soviet Union and Japan as part of the support efforts for a round-the-world flight attempt. Thiepval struck a rock and sank off the British Columbia coast in 1930, and her wreck has since become a popular attraction for divers.

== Design and construction ==
Thiepval formed part of the Canadian naval response to Admiralty warnings to Canada about the growing German U-boat threat to merchant shipping in the western Atlantic. Intended to augment anti-submarine patrols off Canada's east coast, the RCN's Battle-class trawlers were modelled on contemporary North Sea trawlers, since the standard types of Canadian fishing vessels were considered unsuitable for patrol work. The resulting design was a 130 ft (40 m)-long vessel with a beam of 25 ft (7.6 m), a 13 ft (4.0 m) draught, and a top speed of 10 knots (19 km/h; 12 mph), which made it roughly comparable to the Royal Navy's Castle-class trawlers. The QF 12-pounder (76 mm, 3 in) 12 cwt gun that was the Battle-class trawlers' main armament was considered to be the smallest gun that stood a chance of putting a surfaced U-boat out of action, and they also carried a small number of depth charges. (Note: "Cwt" is the abbreviation for hundredweight, 12 cwt referring to the weight of the gun.)

Built by shipyards on the Great Lakes and Saint Lawrence River at a cost of some $191,000 each, the trawlers were named after battles of the Western Front. Construction took longer than expected, and the ships entered service relatively late in the war. Thiepval, named after the 1916 Battle of Thiepval Ridge, was built by the Kingston Shipbuilding Company in Kingston, Ontario. Launched in 1917, she was commissioned into the RCN on 24 July 1918.

== Service history ==
Thiepval spent the last months of the war in service on Canada's east coast, carrying out escort and patrol operations. In early 1919, as part of the reallocation of ships in Canada's greatly reduced postwar navy, she accompanied Armentières, Givenchy, and Stadacona on a trip via the Panama Canal to the west coast. Decommissioned at Esquimalt, British Columbia on 19 March 1920, Thiepval was transferred to the Department of Marine and Fisheries as a patrol vessel.

Thiepval's duties included taking part in winter-time search and rescue patrols off the west coast of Vancouver Island. Initiated by the RCN after the First World War, the patrols were a response to the dangerous waters off Vancouver Island, which were considered part of the Graveyard of the Pacific. In addition to search and rescue patrols, the trawler also carried out fisheries protection work, sometimes seizing US fishing boats that had entered Canadian waters. Thiepval also carried out seal counts as part of the North Pacific Fur Seal Convention of 1911. On at least one occasion, she intercepted rum-runners near the Alaska border. In her first few years on the west coast, Thiepval struck rocks twice: in 1920, near Prince Rupert, and in 1921 in Gunboat Passage near Bella Bella, but on both occasions suffered relatively little damage.

=== 1924 trip to the Soviet Union and Japan ===
HMCS Thiepval in Petropavlovsk, 1924.

Reacquired by the RCN, Thiepval was recommissioned in April 1923, and in February 1924 was given the task of helping to support the round-the-world flight attempt of Major Stuart-MacLaren. Proceeding across the North Pacific via the Aleutian Islands and the Kamchatka Peninsula, Thiepval arrived in Hakodate, Japan, carrying supplies and equipment for the Vickers Vulture flying boat and its crew. In the process, Thiepval became the first Canadian warship to visit the Soviet Union and Japan. The Canadian government had also given Thiepval the secret assignment of investigating American and Japanese territories in the North Pacific to see if they were being fortified in contravention of the 1922 Washington Naval Treaty; it turned out that they were not.

After waiting in Hakodate for the flight to approach Japan, Thiepval headed back to the Soviet Union, where she waited for the aircraft and its crew in Petropavlovsk. After arriving on 24 July, the flight was delayed by bad weather until 4 August, when it departed on its next leg. Heavy fog forced an emergency landing at sea, where the aircraft was badly damaged by waves before coming ashore at Nikolskoye, on Bering Island. Thiepval, steaming through the night, rescued the flyers and salvaged the wreckage of their aircraft before sailing for Vancouver. During their stay in Hakodate, Thiepval's crew acquired a brown bear, which they brought back to Esquimalt as a mascot. Called Bruno, or sometimes "Haca-Daddy", the bear became addicted to the alcohol given to him by sailors, who also took him along when they went drinking in local taverns. Bruno ultimately died after eating poisonous dockyard supplies.

=== Later service and loss ===
Following her return from the trans-Pacific voyage, Thiepval returned to patrol work and training duties. In 1925, she came to the assistance of another Battle-class trawler, Armentières, which had struck a rock in Pipestem Inlet in Barkley Sound. The following year, she towed the Mexican schooner Chapultepec off the rocks at Carmnanah Point, on the southwest coast of Vancouver Island. Mostly, however, her routine consisted of fisheries and search and rescue patrols, as well as chasing rum-runners.

On 27 February 1930, Thiepval was on patrol when she struck an uncharted rock in the Broken Islands of Barkley Sound on British Columbia's coast. Because the vessel had come to rest on a rock ledge, there was some hope that she could be salvaged, and Armentières came to the ship's assistance. The damage proved too great, however, and she sank the following day in the channel that now bears her name. In 1962, three years after the wreck had been located, divers recovered Thiepval's deck gun, which is now displayed in the fishing village of Ucluelet. Lying in just 45 feet (14 m) of water, the wreck is accessible to sport divers and has become a popular dive site. In 1970, the wreck was made a part of Parks Canada's Pacific Rim National Park Reserve as a Shipwreck of National Historical Significance. In 2011, the Department of National Defence organized a survey of the wreck site following reports of unexploded munitions being seen by divers. In March 2017, The Royal Canadian Navy sent clearance divers to conduct a survey of the wreck and develop a plan to remove the unexploded munitions. Removal and disposal of the unexploded ordnance occurred in 2017.
