= HMCS Arras =

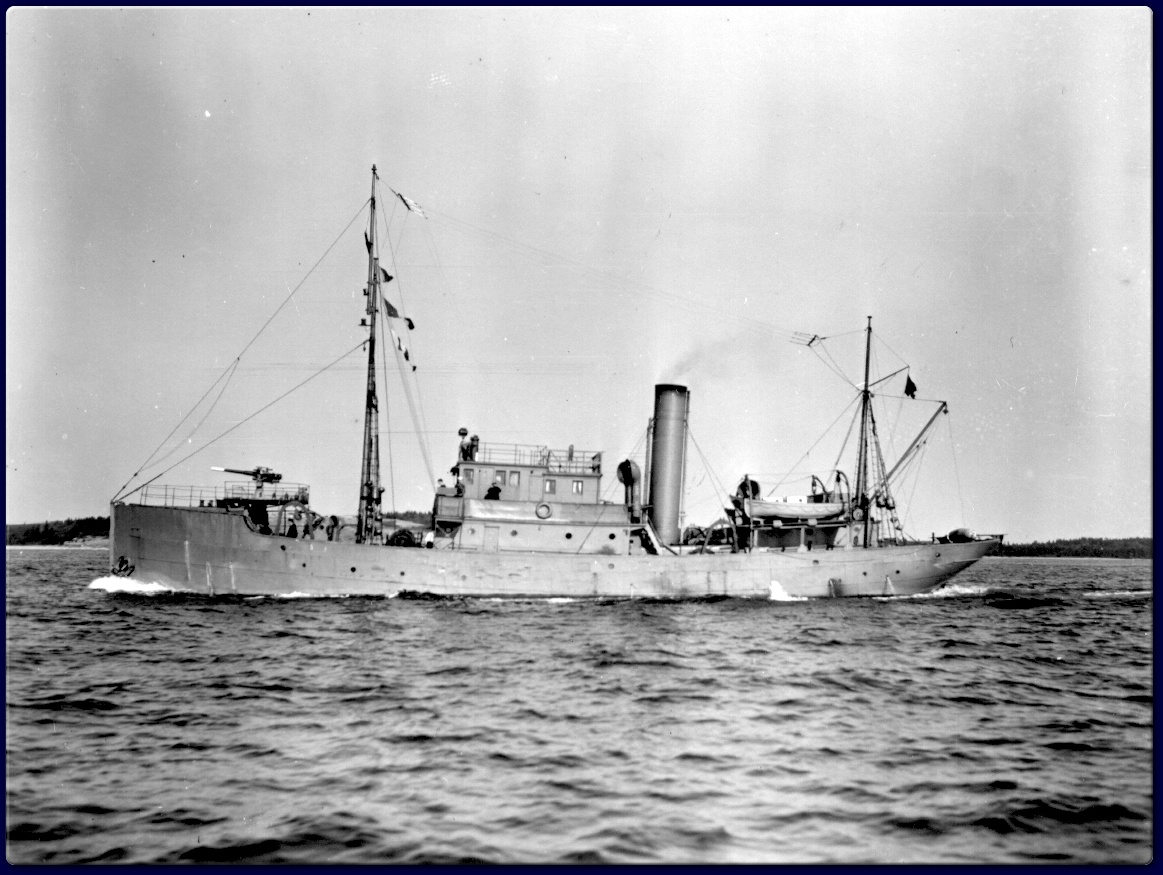
- HMCS Arras in 1940

History

Canada
- Name: Arras
- Namesake: Battle of Arras
- Ordered: 2 February 1917
- Builder: Canadian Vickers, Montreal
- Launched: 15 September 1917
- Commissioned: 5 June 1918
- Decommissioned: 1 April 1919
- Recommissioned: 11 September 1939
- Decommissioned: 1 April 1946
- Fate: Broken up at Halifax, 1957

General characteristics
- Class & type: Battle-class naval trawler
- Displacement: 357 long tons (363 t)
- Length: 130 ft (40 m)
- Beam: 25 ft (7.6 m)
- Draught: 13 ft (4.0 m)
- Propulsion: Single screw steam triple expansion, 480 ihp (360 kW)
- Speed: 10 knots (19 km/h; 12 mph)
- Armament: 1 × QF 12-pounder 12 cwt naval gun

HMCS Arras was one of twelve Battle-class naval trawlers that saw service with the Royal Canadian Navy (RCN). The vessel entered service in 1918 near the end of the First World War and was used for patrolling and escort duties along the Atlantic Coast of Canada. Following the war, Arras was transferred to the Department of Marine and Fisheries where the ship was used as a fisheries patrol vessel. Following the outbreak of the Second World War, the ship re-entered RCN service as a gate vessel. In 1943, the ship was heavily damaged by fire and was broken up in 1957.

== Design and description ==
The RCN's Battle-class trawlers formed part of the Canadian naval response to Admiralty warnings to Canada about the growing German U-boat threat to merchant shipping in the western Atlantic. Intended to augment anti-submarine patrols off Canada's east coast, these ships were modelled on contemporary British North Sea trawlers, since the standard types of Canadian fishing vessels were considered unsuitable for patrol work.

Twelve vessels were ordered on 2 February 1917 from two shipyards, Polson Iron Works of Toronto and Canadian Vickers of Montreal. Those vessels built at Canadian Vickers displaced 357 long tons (363 t) and were 130 feet (40 m) long overall with a beam of 25 feet (7.6 m) and a draught of 13 feet (4.0 m). The vessels were propelled by a steam-powered triple expansion engine driving one shaft creating 480 indicated horsepower (360 kW) giving the vessels a maximum speed of 10 knots (19 km/h; 12 mph).

All twelve trawlers were equipped with a QF 12-pounder 12 cwt naval gun mounted forward. (Note: "Cwt" is the abbreviation for hundredweight, 20 cwt referring to the weight of the gun.) This was considered to be the smallest gun that stood a chance of putting a surfaced U-boat out of action, and they also carried a small number of depth charges. The trawlers were named after battles of the Western Front during the First World War that Canadians had been involved in. They cost between $155,000 and $160,000 per vessel. (Note: Adjusted for inflation to 2026 dollars, $2,859,663 to $2,951,910) (Note: Tucker places the cost at $191,000 (adjusted for inflation to 2026 dollars, $3,523,843))

== Service history ==
Arras was named for the Battle of Arras and constructed by Canadian Vickers at Montreal, launching on 15 September 1917. (Note: Macpherson and Barrie give conflicting information in their text, claiming the ship was constructed by both Kingston Shipbuilding and Canadian Vickers. Other sources agree that the ship was built by Canadian Vickers.) Intended for use during the 1917 shipping season, the construction of the vessels was delayed by the entry of the United States into the war. With higher wages found south of the border, a shortage of skilled labour developed in the shipyards, coupled with a shortage of construction material. The six vessels ordered from Canadian Vickers were delayed further by difficulty in providing engines for the trawlers. The hulls had been finished during Summer 1917. However, the engines did not arrive until the fall. The ship was commissioned on 8 July 1918.

Arras sailed to the east coast where for the 1918 shipping season, all the Battle-class trawlers were assigned to patrol and escort duties based out of Sydney, Nova Scotia. The vessel performed these duties until the end of the war and remained in RCN service until 1919. Arras was transferred to the Department of Marine and Fisheries in 1920. and was deployed as a fisheries protection ship on the Atlantic coast. Arras often served as the hospital ship for the fishing fleet on the Grand Banks of Newfoundland. On 11 September 1939, Arras returned to RCN service following the outbreak of the Second World War. The trawler was initially stationed at Halifax, Nova Scotia as the gate vessel Gate Vessel 15. In mid-1941 the vessel transferred to Sydney, where, in November 1943, was significantly damaged by fire. In 1949, the vessel was sold to Halifax Shipyards and was broken up in at Halifax in December 1957.
