= HMCS Arleux =

Canadian warship used during the World Wars

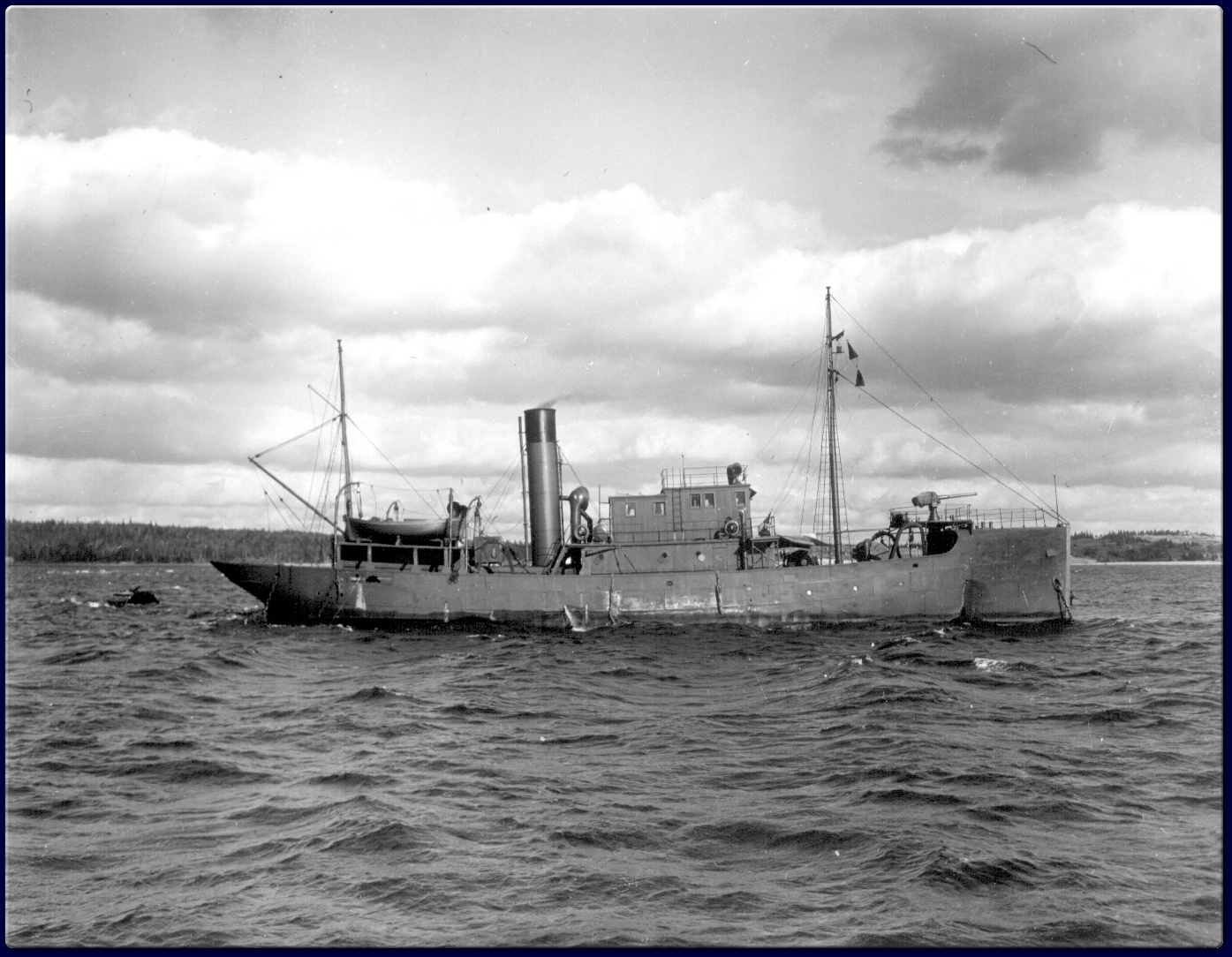
- HMCS Arleux as a gate vessel at Halifax in 1940

History

Canada
- Name: Arleux
- Namesake: Battle of Arleux
- Ordered: 2 February 1917
- Builder: Canadian Vickers, Montreal
- Launched: 9 August 1917
- Commissioned: 5 June 1918
- Decommissioned: 30 June 1922
- Recommissioned: 13 September 1939
- Decommissioned: 15 February 1946
- Fate: Foundered off White Head Bay, Nova Scotia, August 1948

General characteristics
- Class & type: Battle-class naval trawler
- Displacement: 357 long tons (363 t)
- Length: 130 ft (40 m)
- Beam: 25 ft (7.6 m)
- Draught: 13 ft (4.0 m)
- Propulsion: Single screw steam triple expansion, 480 ihp (360 kW)
- Speed: 10 knots (19 km/h; 12 mph)
- Armament: 1 × QF 12-pounder 12 cwt naval gun

HMCS Arleux was one of twelve Battle-class naval trawlers used by the Royal Canadian Navy (RCN). Entering service in 1918 near the end of the First World War, the vessel had a short career with the RCN, being transferred to the Department of Marine and Fisheries in 1922. Arleux was used for fisheries patrol off the east coast of Canada until 1939, when the ship was reacquired by the RCN at the onset of the Second World War. Used as a gate vessel during the war and designated Gate Vessel 16, the ship was sold for mercantile purposes following the war. The ship foundered in 1948 off the coast of Nova Scotia.

== Design and description ==
The RCN's Battle-class trawlers formed part of the Canadian naval response to Admiralty warnings to Canada about the growing German U-boat threat to merchant shipping in the western Atlantic. Intended to augment anti-submarine patrols off Canada's east coast, these ships were modelled on contemporary British North Sea trawlers, since the standard types of Canadian fishing vessels were considered unsuitable for patrol work.

Twelve vessels were ordered on 2 February 1917 from two shipyards, Polson Iron Works of Toronto and Canadian Vickers of Montreal. Those vessels built at Canadian Vickers displaced 357 long tons (363 t) and were 130 feet (40 m) long overall with a beam of 25 feet (7.6 m) and a draught of 13 feet (4.0 m). The vessels were propelled by a steam-powered triple expansion engine driving one shaft creating 480 indicated horsepower (360 kW) giving the vessels a maximum speed of 10 knots (19 km/h; 12 mph).

All twelve trawlers were equipped with a QF 12-pounder 12 cwt naval gun mounted forward. (Note: "Cwt" is the abbreviation for hundredweight, 20 cwt referring to the weight of the gun.) This was considered to be the smallest gun that stood a chance of putting a surfaced U-boat out of action, and they also carried a small number of depth charges. The trawlers were named after battles of the Western Front during the First World War that Canadians had been involved in. They cost between $155,000 and $160,000 per vessel. (Note: Adjusted for inflation to 2026 dollars, $2,859,663 to $2,951,910) (Note: Tucker places the cost at $191,000 (adjusted for inflation to 2026 dollars, $3,523,843))

== Construction and service history ==
Named after the April 1917 Battle of Arleux, the ship was built by Canadian Vickers at Montreal and launched on 9 August 1917. Intended for use during the 1917 shipping season, the construction of the vessels was delayed by the entry of the United States into the war. With higher wages found south of the border, a shortage of skilled labour developed in the shipyards, coupled with a shortage of construction material. The six vessels ordered from Canadian Vickers were delayed further by difficulty in providing engines for the trawlers. The hulls had been finished during Summer 1917. However, the engines did not arrive until the fall. The trawler was commissioned on 5 June 1918 with sister ship Armentières.

Arleux sailed to the east coast where for the 1918 shipping season, all the Battle-class trawlers were assigned to patrol and escort duties based out of Sydney, Nova Scotia. Following the end of the war, Arleux was used operationally by the Department of Marine and Fisheries, but remained a commissioned RCN vessel until 30 June 1922. Arleux was used a fisheries patrol vessel on the east coast and often served as a mother ship to the winter haddock fishing fleet. Reacquired by the RCN and re-commissioned on 13 September 1939, Arleux was designated Gate Vessel 16 at Halifax, Nova Scotia in 1940, remaining in this role for the rest of the war. During her time as a gate vessel, Arleux was rammed and nearly sunk by RMS Queen Mary, with much of the ship flooded. Arleux was sold for mercantile use on 15 February 1946 to Atlantic Trawlers Ltd. The ship foundered on 19 August 1948 off White Head Bay, Nova Scotia.
