= HMCS Festubert =

Royal Canadian Navy vessel

- HMCS Festubert underway

History

Canada
- Name: Festubert
- Namesake: Battle of Festubert
- Builder: Polson Iron Works, Toronto
- Launched: 2 August 1917
- Commissioned: 13 November 1917
- Recommissioned: 1 May 1923
- Decommissioned: 1934
- Recommissioned: 1939
- Decommissioned: 17 April 1945
- Fate: Sold 1946, scuttled 30 June 1971

General characteristics
- Class & type: Battle-class naval trawler
- Displacement: 320 long tons (330 t)
- Length: 130 ft (40 m)
- Beam: 23 ft 5 in (7.14 m)
- Draught: 13 ft 5 in (4.09 m)
- Propulsion: 1 x triple expansion, 480 ihp (360 kW)
- Speed: 10 knots (12 mph; 19 km/h)
- Armament: 1 × QF 12-pounder 12 cwt naval gun

HMCS Festubert was one of twelve Battle-class naval trawlers constructed for and used by the Royal Canadian Navy (RCN) during the First World War. Following the war, Festubert remained in Canadian service as a training ship until 1934. Reactivated for the Second World War, the ship was used as a gate vessel in the defence of Halifax, Nova Scotia and re-designated Gate Vessel 17. Following the war, the trawler was sold for commercial use and renamed Inverleigh. Inverleigh was scuttled off Burgeo, Newfoundland on 30 June 1971.

== Design and description ==
The RCN's Battle-class trawlers formed part of the Canadian naval response to Admiralty warnings to Canada about the growing German U-boat threat to merchant shipping in the western Atlantic. Intended to augment anti-submarine patrols off Canada's east coast, these ships were modelled on contemporary British North Sea trawlers, since the standard types of Canadian fishing vessels were considered unsuitable for patrol work.

Twelve vessels were ordered on 2 February 1917 from two shipyards, Polson Iron Works of Toronto and Canadian Vickers of Montreal. Those vessels built at Polson Iron Works displaced 320 long tons (330 t) and were 130 feet (40 m) long overall with a beam of 23 feet 5 inches (7.14 m) and a draught of 13 feet 5 inches (4.09 m). They were propelled by a steam-powered triple expansion engine driving one shaft creating 480 indicated horsepower (360 kW) giving the vessels a maximum speed of 10 knots (19 km/h; 12 mph).

All twelve trawlers were equipped with a QF 12-pounder 12 cwt naval gun mounted forward. (Note: "Cwt" is the abbreviation for hundredweight, 20 cwt referring to the weight of the gun.) This was considered to be the smallest gun that stood a chance of putting a surfaced U-boat out of action, and they also carried a small number of depth charges. The trawlers were named after battles of the Western Front during the First World War that Canadians had been involved in. They cost between $155,000 and $160,000 per vessel. (Note: Adjusted for inflation to 2026 dollars, $2,859,663 to $2,951,910) (Note: Tucker places the cost at $191,000 (adjusted for inflation to 2026 dollars, $3,523,843))

== Service history ==
Built by Polson Iron Works at Toronto, Festubert, named for the Battle of Festubert, was launched on 2 August 1917. Intended for use during the 1917 shipping season, the construction of the vessels was delayed by the entry of the United States into the war. With higher wages found south of the border, a shortage of skilled labour developed in the shipyards, coupled with a shortage of construction material. The trawler was commissioned on 13 November 1917. Festubert sailed to Halifax following her commissioning for defence of the Atlantic coast of Canada. For the defence of shipping in Canadian waters in 1918, the entire Battle class was assigned to work out of Sydney, Nova Scotia. Following the sinking of the merchant vessel Luz Blanca off Halifax, Festubert was among the vessels tasked with hunting for the German submarine U-156, which had been operating off the coast of Nova Scotia.

The ship remained in Canadian service following the end of the war until being paid off in 1920. After being recommissioned on 1 May 1923 as a training ship on the east coast, having been re-designated a minesweeper in 1922. With sister ship Ypres, Festubert trained with the destroyers on the east coast until 1934 she was again paid off and was placed in reserve. Festubert was reactivated in 1939 for service as a gate vessel at Halifax. Re-designated Gate Vessel 17 in September, the ship collected five survivors after Ypres was rammed and sunk by the British battleship HMS Revenge on 12 May 1940. The ship was sold for commercial service in 1946, emerging as Inverleigh in 1947. On 30 June 1971 Inverleigh was scuttled off Burgeo, Newfoundland.
