= Battle-class trawler =

1917 Canadian naval trawler class

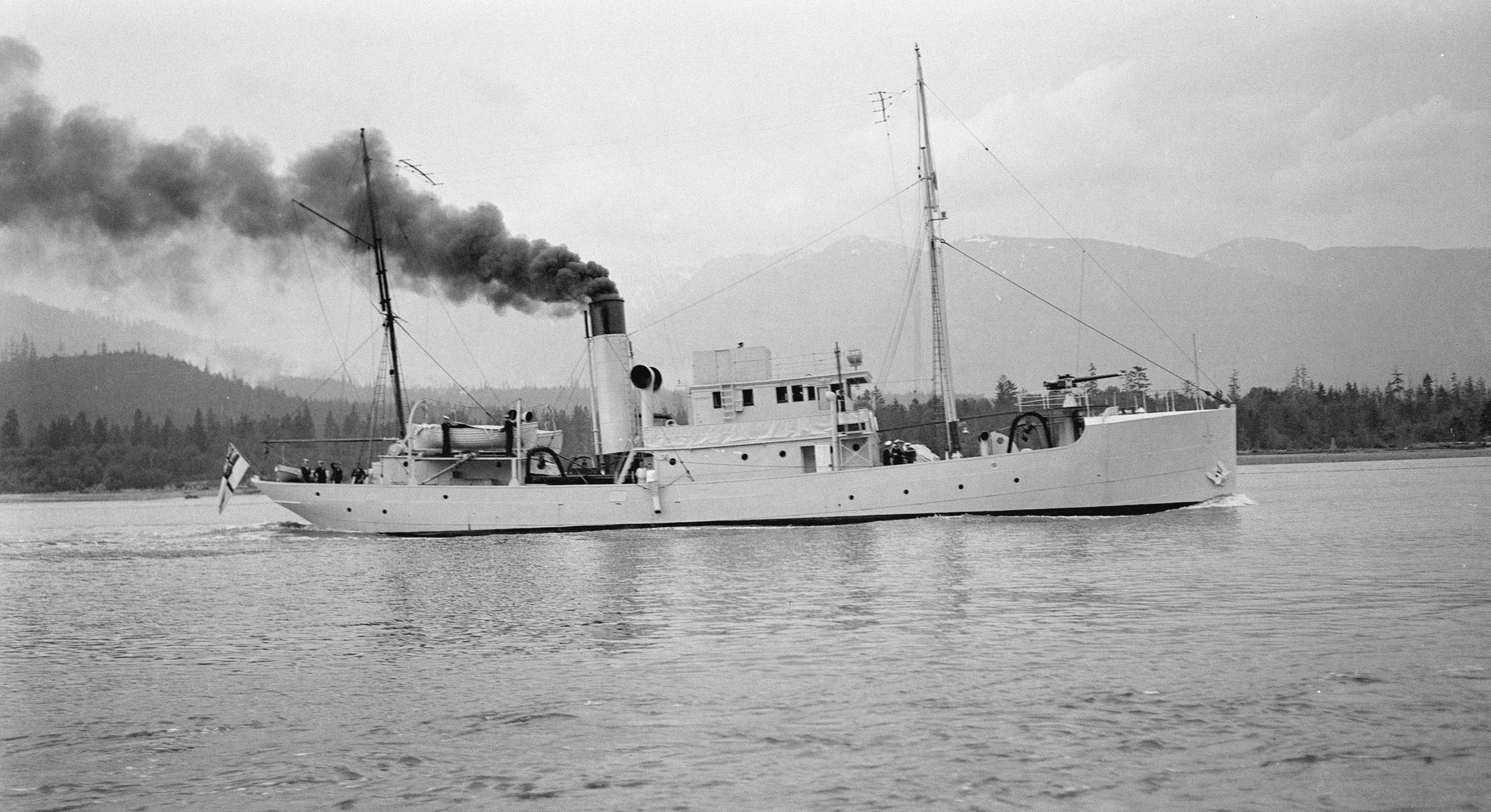
- Armentières at Vancouver on 27 May 1933

Class overview
- Name: Battle class
- Builders: Canadian Vickers, Montreal; Polson Iron Works, Toronto; Kingston Shipbuilding, Kingston
- Operators: Royal Canadian Navy
- Built: 1917
- In commission: 1917–1946
- Completed: 12
- Lost: 4
- Scrapped: 8

General characteristics
- Type: Naval trawler
- Displacement: 320 long tons (330 t) (Festubert, Messines, St. Eloi, St. Julien, Vimy, Ypres); 357 long tons (363 t) (Arleux, Armentières, Arras, Givenchy, Loos, Thiepval)
- Length: 130 ft (40 m)
- Beam: 23 ft 5 in (7.14 m) (Festubert, Messines, St. Eloi, St. Julien, Vimy, Ypres); 25 ft (7.6 m) (Arleux, Armentières, Arras, Givenchy, Loos, Thiepval)
- Draught: 13 ft 5 in (4.09 m) (Festubert, Messines, St. Eloi, St. Julien, Vimy, Ypres); 13 ft (4.0 m) (Arleux, Armentières, Arras, Givenchy, Loos, Thiepval)
- Propulsion: 1 x triple expansion, 480 ihp (360 kW)
- Speed: 10 knots (12 mph; 19 km/h)
- Armament: 1 × QF 12 pounder 12 cwt naval gun

The Battle-class trawlers were a class of naval trawlers built for and used by the Royal Canadian Navy (RCN) during the First World War. Between the wars, some remained in RCN service, but most were transferred to the Department of Marine and Fisheries, where they performed a number of functions, including working as lightships and fisheries patrol vessels. During the Second World War, a number of these trawlers were re-acquired by the RCN, but all the navy's Battle-class trawlers were decommissioned soon after the war. A number of the class remained in civilian government and commercial service for years after the war, although most had been disposed of by the early 1960s.

== Design and description ==
The RCN's Battle-class trawlers formed part of the Canadian naval response to Admiralty warnings to Canada about the growing German U-boat threat to merchant shipping in the western Atlantic. Intended to augment anti-submarine patrols off Canada's east coast, these ships were modelled on contemporary British North Sea trawlers, since the standard types of Canadian fishing vessels were considered unsuitable for patrol work.

Twelve vessels were ordered on 2 February 1917 from two shipyards, Polson Iron Works of Toronto and Canadian Vickers of Montreal. Those vessels built at Polson Iron Works displaced 320 long tons (330 t) and were 130 feet (40 m) long overall with a beam of 23 feet 5 inches (7.14 m) and a draught of 13 feet 5 inches (4.09 m). Those trawlers ordered from Canadian Vickers displaced 357 long tons (363 t), with the same length, a beam of 25 feet (7.6 m) and a draught of 13 feet (4.0 m). The vessels were propelled by a steam-powered triple expansion engine driving one shaft creating 480 indicated horsepower (360 kW) giving the vessels a maximum speed of 10 knots (19 km/h; 12 mph).

All twelve trawlers were equipped with a QF 12-pounder 12 cwt naval gun mounted forward. (Note: "Cwt" is the abbreviation for hundredweight, 20 cwt referring to the weight of the gun.) This was considered to be the smallest gun that stood a chance of putting a surfaced U-boat out of action. They also carried a small number of depth charges. The trawlers were named after battles of the Western Front during the First World War that Canadians had been involved in. They cost between $155,000 and $160,000 per vessel. (Note: Adjusted for inflation to 2025 dollars, $2,736,011 to $2,824,270) (Note: Tucker places the cost at $191,000 (adjusted for inflation to 2025 dollars, $3,371,472))

== Construction and service ==
Of the twelve trawlers, six contracts were awarded to Polson and six to Canadian Vickers. Of the six awarded to Canadian Vickers, two were allotted to Kingston Shipbuilding in Kingston, Ontario. Intended for use during the 1917 shipping season, the construction of the vessels was delayed by the entry of the United States into the war. With higher wages found south of the border, a shortage of skilled labour developed in the shipyards, coupled with a shortage of construction material.

The six trawlers constructed by Polson were all launched in June 1917, but were handed over to the Royal Canadian Navy until the fall. The six vessels built by Polson, Vimy, Ypres, St. Julien, Messines, Festubert, and St. Eloi, were commissioned on 13 November 1917. The six vessels ordered from Canadian Vickers were delayed further by difficulty in providing engines for the trawlers. The hulls had been finished during Summer 1917. However, the engines did not arrive until the fall. The first two, Arleux and Armentières, commissioned on 5 June 1918 and the remaining four, Loos, Thiepval, Givenchy and Arras, were commissioned on 1 August 1918.

For the defence of shipping in Canadian waters in 1918, the entire Battle class was assigned to work out of Sydney, Nova Scotia. Following the sinking of the merchant vessel Luz Blanca off Halifax, Nova Scotia, Armentières, St. Eloi and Festubert were tasked with hunting for the German submarine U-156, which had been operating off the coast of Nova Scotia. The rest of the Battle class was used for patrol and escort duties. One of the class was assigned to the Gulf Escort Force, escorting vessels through the Gulf of St. Lawrence.

=== Interwar period ===
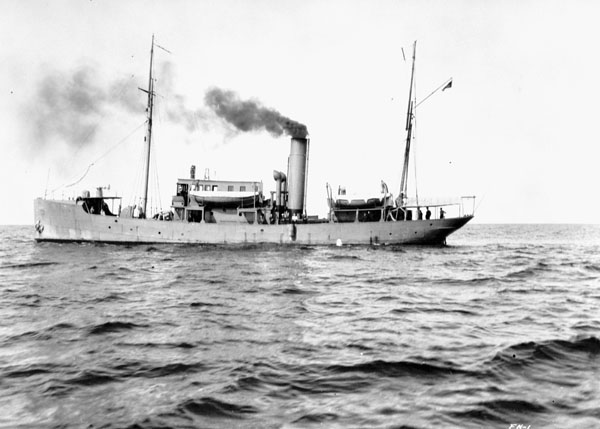
Thiepval as fisheries patrol ship in the Hecate Strait

The twelve trawlers remained in commission with the RCN until 1920, and in early 1919, three of them (Armentières, Givenchy, and Thiepval) accompanied Stadacona on a trip to the west coast via the Panama Canal. In 1920, nine of the class were transferred to the Department of Marine and Fisheries, where they served as buoy tenders, fisheries patrol vessels, and lightships, although one of the ships (Armentières) was soon returned to the RCN. Loos became a buoy tender, while Arleux, Arras, and Givenchy became fisheries patrol vessels. Messines, St. Eloi, St. Julien, and Vimy were converted to lightships. They remained in service with the Department of Marine and Fisheries throughout the interwar period, but a number were re-acquired by the RCN on the eve of the Second World War and returned to naval service.

Two of the class (Festubert and Ypres) were not transferred to civilian government service, and were rejoined by Armentières and Thiepval in 1923. In 1922, the Battle class were redesignated minesweepers. Remaining with the RCN throughout this time, they served as patrol and training vessels, and some were placed in reserve at various points. Festubert and Ypres operated on the east coast while Armentières and Thiepval operated on the west coast. In 1924, Thiepval undertook a lengthy trip across the North Pacific to the Soviet Union and Japan to support an ultimately unsuccessful British round-the-world flight attempt. On 2 September 1925 Armentières was sunk in Pipestem Inlet, British Columbia. The trawler was refloated and recommissioned in 1926. Thiepval struck an uncharted rock in the Broken Islands of Barkley Sound on British Columbia's west coast, and sank.

=== Second World War and fate ===
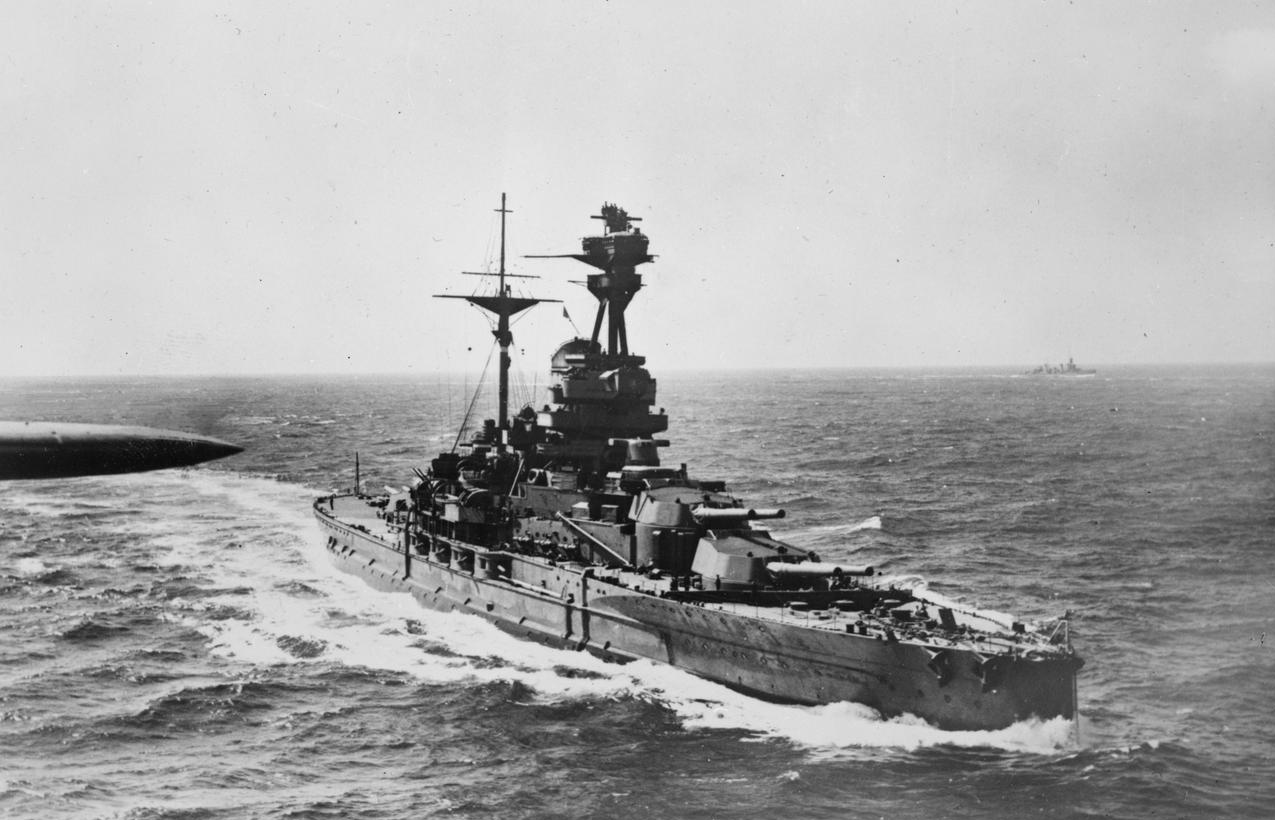
HMS Revenge underway

By 1939, only one Battle-class trawler, Armentières, remained in active naval service, although Festubert was in reserve and Ypres had just emerged from a refit to become a gate vessel for Halifax's anti-submarine defences. During 1939, the RCN re-acquired five other members of the class: Arleux, Arras, Loos, and St. Eloi on the east coast, and Givenchy on the west coast. The east coast trawlers served primarily as gate vessels at Nova Scotia ports including Halifax and Sydney. In 1940, the British battleship HMS Revenge accidentally rammed and sank Ypres, but without loss of life. On the west coast, Armentières served as an examination vessel, while Givenchy served primarily as an accommodation ship.

Following the Second World War, the trawlers that had served with the RCN were soon decommissioned and either sold or returned to civilian government service. Many were broken up in the 1950s or otherwise disposed of in the early 1960s, although two (Armentières and St. Julien) were still in existence in the 1970s, and their final fates remain unclear.

== Ships in class ==
Battle-class trawlers construction info
Name	Builder	Launched	Commissioned	Decommissioned	Recommissioned	Fate
Arleux	Canadian Vickers, Montreal	9 August 1917	5 June 1918	30 June 1922	13 September 1939	Sold for commercial use in 1946, foundered 1948
Armentières	Canadian Vickers, Montreal	11 August 1917	5 June 1918	28 October 1919	1923	Sold for commercial use in 1946
Arras	Canadian Vickers, Montreal	15 September 1917	8 July 1918 (Note: Johnston et al. claim the ship was commissioned on 1 August 1918.)	1919	11 September 1939	Sold for scrap and broken up 1957
Festubert	Polson Iron Works, Toronto	2 August 1917	13 November 1917		1 May 1923	Scuttled 1971
Givenchy	Canadian Vickers, Montreal	15 September 1917	22 June 1918	12 August 1919	25 June 1940	Broken up 1953
Loos	Kingston Shipbuilding, Kingston	27 September 1917	1 August 1918	1920	12 December 1940	Sold 1945, broken up 1949
Messines	Polson Iron Works, Toronto	16 June 1917	13 November 1917	1920	—	Converted to lightship Lightship No. 3, broken up 1962
St. Eloi	Polson Iron Works, Toronto	2 August 1917	13 November 1917	1920	1940	Discarded 1962
St. Julien	Polson Iron Works, Toronto	16 June 1917	13 November 1917	1920	—	Transferred to Department of Marine and Fisheries and converted to lightship Lightship No. 22
Thiepval	Kingston Shipbuilding, Kingston	1917	24 July 1918	19 March 1920	1 April 1923	Sunk 27 February 1930
Vimy	Polson Iron Works, Toronto	16 June 1917	13 November 1917	30 November 1918	—	Transferred to Department of Marine and Fisheries, converted to lightvessel Lightship No. 5, 1922
Ypres	Polson Iron Works, Toronto	16 June 1917	13 November 1917	1920	1 May 1923	Sunk 12 May 1940
