= HMS Revenge (06) =

1916 Lead Revenge-class battleship of the Royal Navy

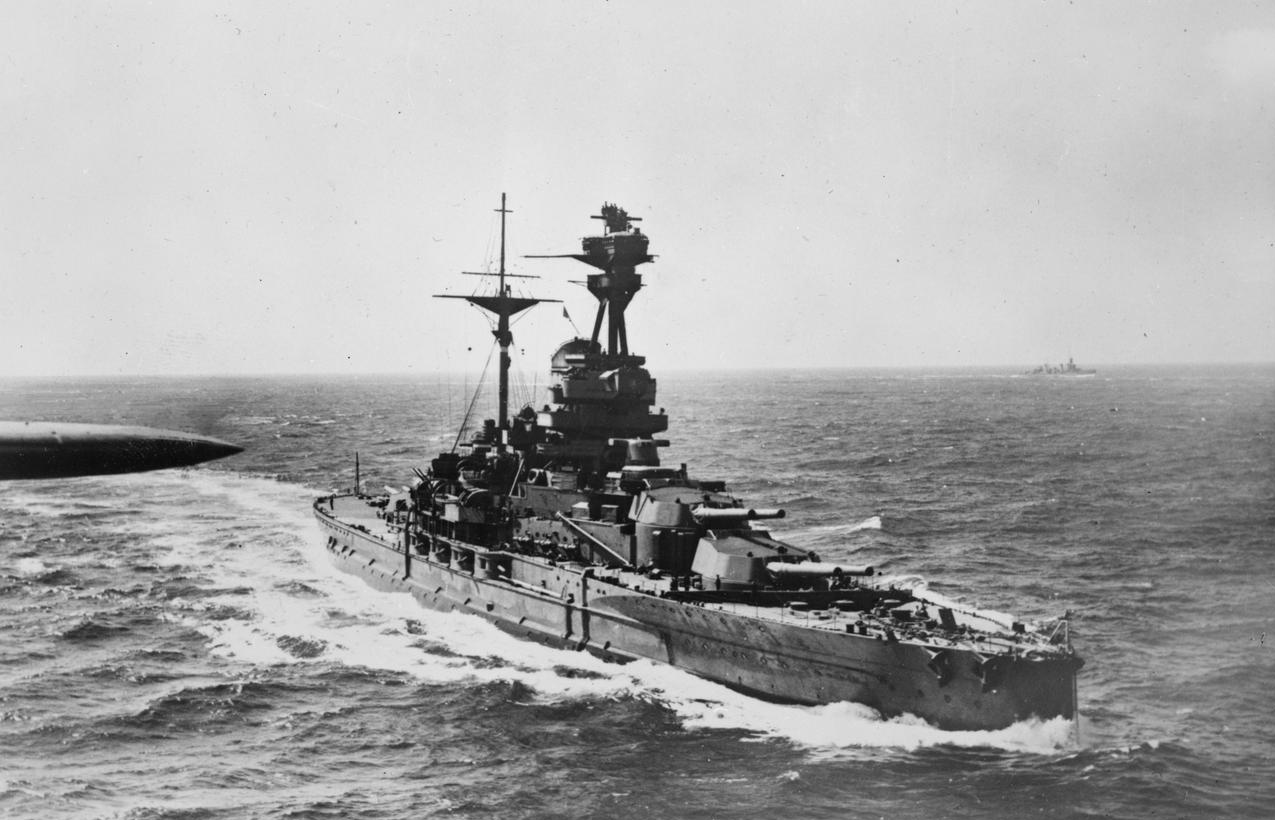
- Revenge at sea, July–August 1940

History

United Kingdom
- Name: Revenge
- Builder: Vickers Limited, Barrow-in-Furness
- Laid down: 22 December 1913
- Launched: 29 May 1915
- Commissioned: 1 February 1916
- Identification: Pennant number: 06
- Motto: Intaminatis fulget honoribus ("Shines with untarnished honours")
- Fate: Scrapped, 5 September 1948

General characteristics (as built)
- Class & type: Revenge-class battleship
- Displacement: 29,590 long tons (30,060 t); 32,820 long tons (33,350 t) (Deep load)
- Length: 620 ft 7 in (189.2 m)
- Beam: 88 ft 6 in (27.0 m)
- Draught: 33 ft 7 in (10.2 m) (Deep load)
- Installed power: 40,000 shp (30,000 kW); 18 Babcock & Wilcox boilers
- Propulsion: 4 shafts; 2 sets steam turbines
- Speed: 21.9 knots (40.6 km/h; 25.2 mph)
- Range: 7,000 nmi (13,000 km; 8,100 mi) at 10 knots (19 km/h; 12 mph)
- Crew: 940 (1917)
- Armament: 4 × twin 15-inch (381 mm) guns; 14 × single 6-inch (152 mm) guns; 2 × single 3-inch (76 mm) AA guns; 4 × single 47 mm (1.9 in) 3-pdr guns; 4 × 21 in (533 mm) torpedo tubes
- Armour: Waterline belt: 13 in (330 mm); Deck: 1–4 in (25–102 mm); Barbettes: 6–10 in (152–254 mm); Gun turrets: 11–13 in (279–330 mm); Conning tower: 3–11 in (76–279 mm); Bulkheads: 4 to 6 in (102 to 152 mm)

HMS Revenge was the lead ship of five Revenge-class battleships built for the Royal Navy during the First World War in the mid-1910s. The ships were developments of the Queen Elizabeth-class battleships, with reductions in size and speed to offset increases in armour protection whilst retaining the same main battery of eight 15-inch (381 mm) guns. She was laid down in 1913, launched in 1915 and commissioned in February 1916, early enough to be worked up to see action with the Grand Fleet at the Battle of Jutland in May that year. During the engagement, she engaged German battlecruisers, damaging two of them before being forced to turn away to avoid torpedoes that damaged her squadron flagship and caused the squadron to lose contact with the rest of the fleet. Revenge emerged from the battle unscathed, but she saw no further action during the war, as the British and German fleets turned to more cautious strategies owing to the risk of submarines and naval mines.

During the 1920s and 1930s, Revenge alternated between the Atlantic Fleet and the Mediterranean Fleet. Whilst serving in the Mediterranean in the early 1920s, the ship went to Turkey twice in response to crises arising from the Greco-Turkish War, including the Great Fire of Smyrna in 1922. The ship's interwar career was otherwise uneventful. With the outbreak of the Second World War in September 1939, Revenge was used to escort convoys and transport significant quantities of the country's gold reserves to Canada as part of Operation Fish; these activities continued into 1940. She was involved in the seizure of French warships in Portsmouth after the French surrender in July 1940.

In October 1940, she conducted Operation Medium, an attack on German transport ships that had been collected along the English Channel in preparation for the later-cancelled invasion of Britain. Revenge thereafter resumed convoy escort duties until October 1941, when she was reassigned to the 3rd Battle Squadron and sent to the Far East as tensions with Japan began to rise. British naval forces were strengthened further after the start of the Pacific War in December, leading to the creation of the Eastern Fleet. Revenge and her sister ships were deemed too old to be of use against the Japanese fleet, so they were relegated to convoy escort duties in the Indian Ocean. Badly worn out by 1943, Revenge returned home, where she was removed from front-line service. Her last voyage was to carry Prime Minister Winston Churchill to the Tehran Conference in November 1943. Upon returning, she was assigned to the training establishment HMS Imperieuse, disarmed and eventually broken up in 1948.

== Design and description ==
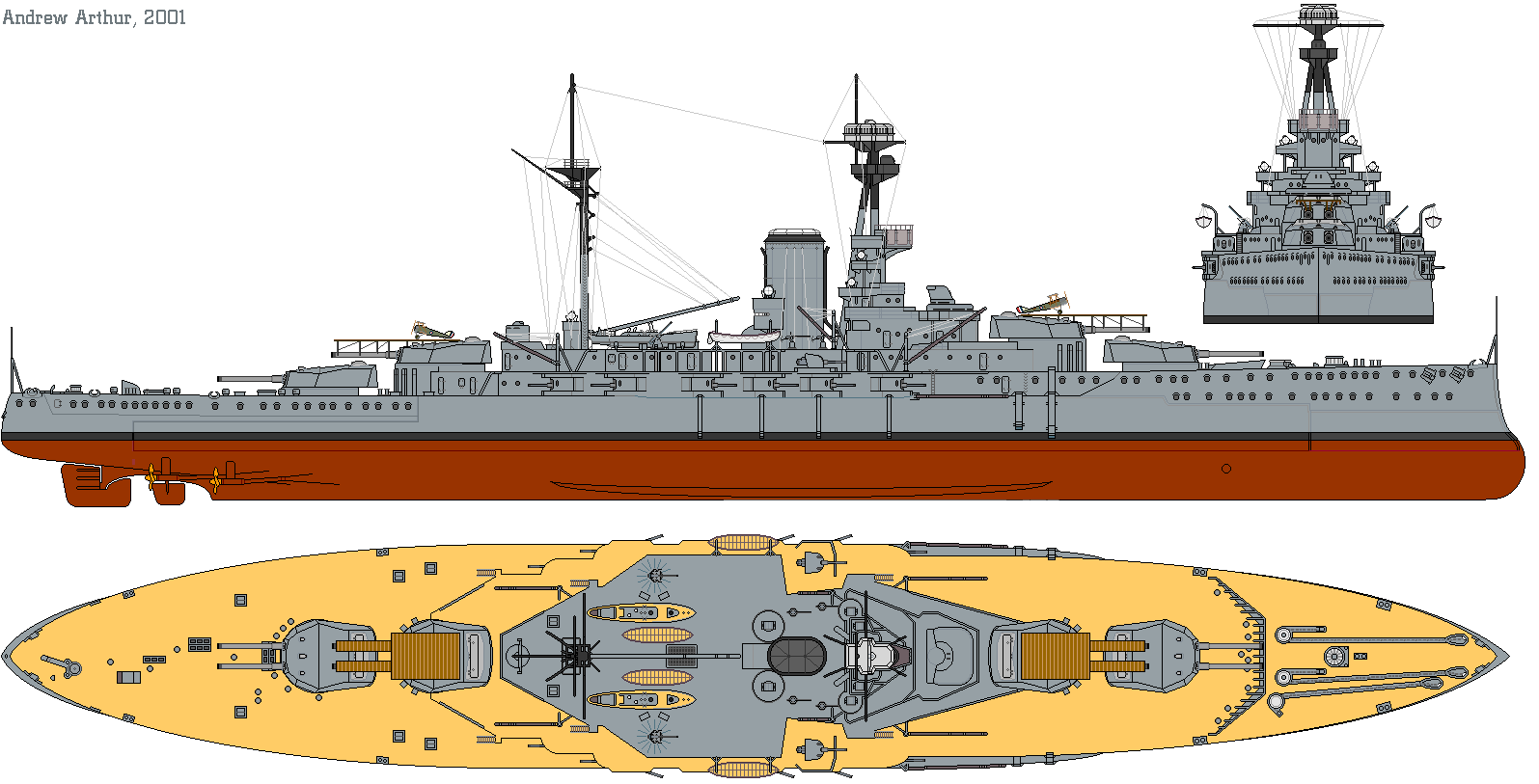
Illustration of Revenge as she appeared in 1916

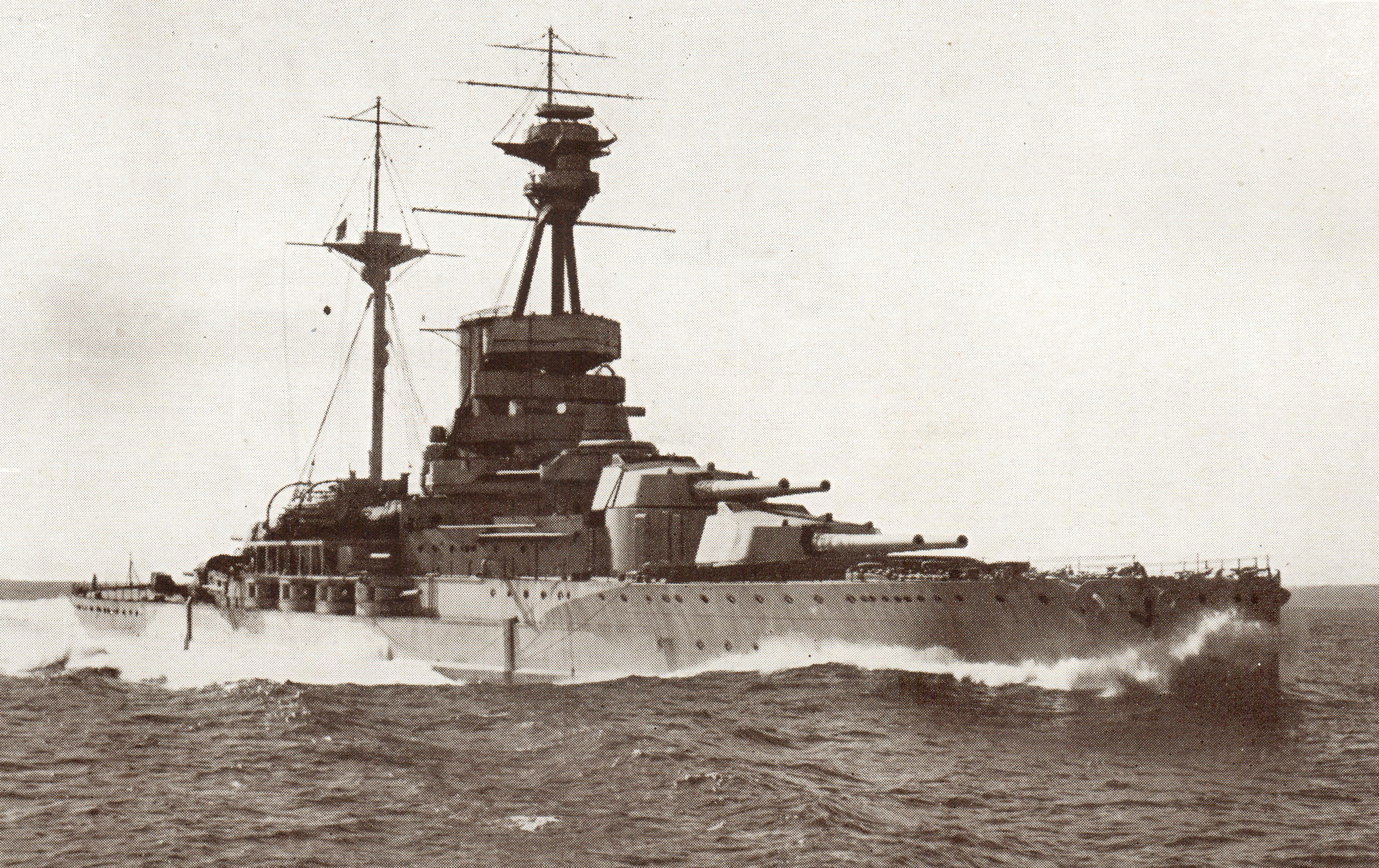
Revenge, builder's photo

The Revenge-class ships were designed as slightly smaller, slower, and more heavily protected versions of the preceding Queen Elizabeth-class battleships. As an economy measure they were intended to revert to the previous practice of using both fuel oil and coal, but First Sea Lord Jackie Fisher rescinded the decision for coal in October 1914. Still under construction, the ships were redesigned to employ oil-fired boilers that increased the power of the engines by 9,000 shaft horsepower (6,700 kW) over the original specification.

Revenge had a length overall of 620 feet 7 inches (189.2 m), a beam of 88 feet 6 inches (27.0 m) and a deep draught of 33 feet 7 inches (10.2 m). She had a displacement of 29,590 long tons (30,060 t) and displaced 32,820 long tons (33,350 t) at deep load. She was powered by two sets of Parsons steam turbines, each driving two shafts, using steam provided by eighteen Babcock & Wilcox boilers. The turbines were rated at 40,000 shp (30,000 kW) and intended to reach a maximum speed of 23 knots (42.6 km/h; 26.5 mph), although the ship only reached a top speed of 21.9 knots (40.6 km/h; 25.2 mph) from 41,938 shp (31,273 kW) during her sea trials on 24 March 1916. She had a range of 7,000 nautical miles (13,000 km; 8,100 mi) at a cruising speed of 10 knots (19 km/h; 12 mph). Her crew numbered 940 officers and ratings in 1917. Her metacentric height was 3.4 feet (1.0 m) at deep load. (Note: The dimensions given by Messers Vickers-Armstrongs who built her differ slightly: 580 feet (176.8 m) B.R. × 88 feet 3.25 inches (26.90 m) × 44 feet 1 inch (13.44 m), 42,660 horsepower (31,810 kW).)

The Revenge class was equipped with eight breech-loading (BL) 15-inch (381 mm) Mk I guns in four twin gun turrets, in two superfiring pairs fore and aft of the superstructure, designated 'A', 'B', 'X', and 'Y' from front to rear. Twelve of the fourteen BL 6-inch (152 mm) Mk XII guns were mounted in casemates along the broadside of the vessel amidships; the remaining pair were mounted on the shelter deck and were protected by gun shields. The ship also mounted four 3-pounder (47-millimetre (1.9 in)) guns. Her anti-aircraft (AA) armament consisted of two quick-firing (QF) 3-inch (76 mm) 20 cwt Mk I (Note: "Cwt" is the abbreviation for hundredweight, 20 cwt referring to the weight of the gun.) guns. She was fitted with four submerged 21-inch (533 mm) torpedo tubes, two on each broadside.

Revenge was completed with two fire-control directors fitted with 15-foot (4.6 m) rangefinders. One was mounted above the conning tower, protected by an armoured hood, and the other was in the spotting top above the tripod foremast. Each turret was also fitted with a 15-foot rangefinder. The main armament could be controlled by 'X' turret as well. The secondary armament was primarily controlled by directors mounted on each side of the compass platform on the foremast once they were fitted in March 1917. A torpedo-control director with a 15-foot rangefinder was mounted at the aft end of the superstructure.

The ship's waterline belt consisted of Krupp cemented armour (KC) that was 13 inches (330 mm) thick between 'A' and 'Y' barbettes and thinned to 4 to 6 inches (102 to 152 mm) towards the ship's ends, but did not reach either the bow or the stern. Above this was a strake of armour 6 inches thick that extended between 'A' and 'X' barbettes. Transverse bulkheads 4 to 6 inches thick ran at an angle from the ends of the thickest part of the waterline belt to 'A' and 'Y' barbettes. The gun turrets were protected by 11 to 13 inches (279 to 330 mm) of KC armour, except for the turret roofs which were 4.75–5 inches (121–127 mm) thick. The barbettes ranged in thickness from 6–10 inches (152–254 mm) above the upper deck, but were only 4 to 6 inches thick below it. The Revenge-class ships had multiple armoured decks that ranged from 1 to 4 inches (25 to 102 mm) in thickness. The main conning tower had 11 inches of armour on the sides with a 3-inch roof. The torpedo director in the rear superstructure had 6 inches of armour protecting it. After the Battle of Jutland, 1 inch of high-tensile steel was added to the main deck over the magazines and additional anti-flash equipment was added in the magazines.

The ship was fitted with flying-off platforms mounted on the roofs of 'B' and 'X' turrets in 1918, from which fighters and reconnaissance aircraft could launch. During the 1928 refit the platform was removed from 'X' turret. The platform on 'B' turret was removed in 1933.

=== Major alterations ===
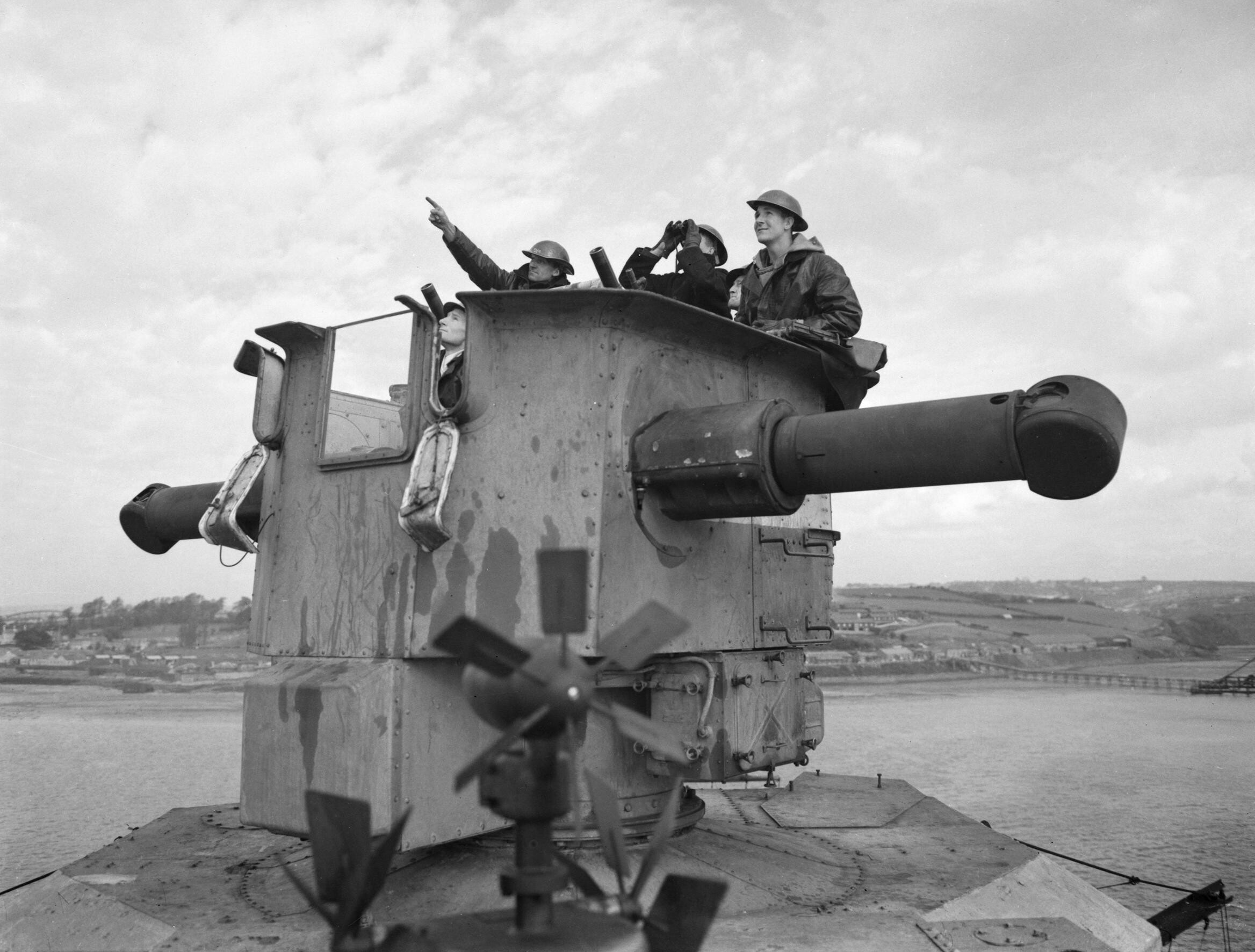
Revenge's forward HACS Mk III director and its crew in 1940

Revenge was fitted with anti-torpedo bulges between October 1917 and February 1918. They were designed to reduce the effect of torpedo detonations and improve stability. They increased her beam by over 13 feet (4 m) to 101 feet 6 inches (30.9 m), her displacement to 32,460 long tons (32,980 t) and reduced her draught to 31 feet 11 inches (9.7 m), all at deep load. They increased her metacentric height to 5.1 feet (1.6 m). Later in 1918, 30-foot (9.1 m) rangefinders were fitted in 'B' and 'X' turrets. In 1919 her complement was 1,240 officers and ratings.

The gun shields for the shelter-deck six-inch guns were replaced by armoured casemates in 1922. Two years later, her anti-aircraft defences were upgraded by replacing the original three-inch AA guns with a pair of QF four-inch (102 mm) AA guns. During the ship's 1928–1929 refit, two more four-inch AA guns were added and the six-inch guns from the shelter deck were removed. In addition a High-Angle Control System (HACS) Mk I director was installed on the spotting top. In 1931 one octuple mount for two-pounder Mk VIII "pom-pom" guns was added abreast the funnel (only on the starboard side) for trials. Its director was added abreast and below the fire-control director in the spotting top. The aft torpedo tubes were also removed at that time. The ship's 1936–1937 refit saw the removal of the torpedo director and its associated rangefinder. Two years later, Revenge's anti-aircraft defences were strengthened by replacing the single mounts of the AA guns with twin mounts and adding the portside octuple two-pounder "pom-pom" mount and its director. A HACS Mk III director replaced the Mk I on the roof of the spotting top and another was added in the position formerly occupied by the torpedo director. A pair of quadruple mounts for Vickers .50 machine guns were added abreast the conning tower. The forward torpedo tubes were also removed at that time.

Wartime modifications for the Revenge-class ships were fairly minimal. Revenge was fitted with a Type 279 early-warning radar in 1941. The following year saw the addition of a Type 273 surface-search radar, a pair of Type 285 anti-aircraft gunnery sets and two Type 282 radars for the "pom-poms". Two four-barrel "pom-poms" were added in late 1941 atop 'B' and 'X' turrets as well as ten 20 mm Oerlikon guns that replaced the quadruple .50-caliber mounts. To save weight and make more room available for the additional crew required to man the new equipment like the radars and Oerlikons, four 6-inch guns were removed in 1943.

== Construction and service ==
=== First World War ===
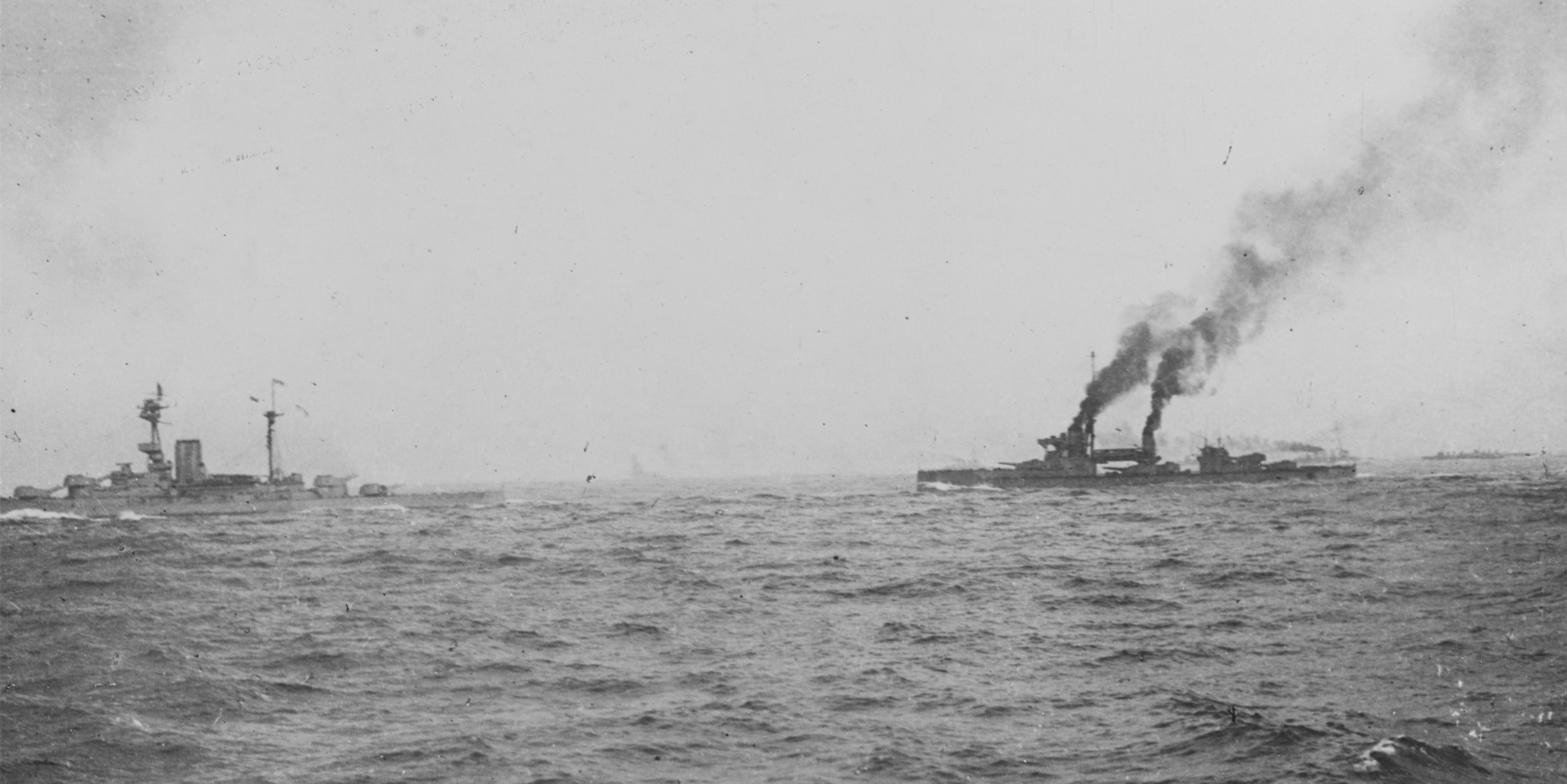
Revenge (left) and the battleship Hercules (right) at the Battle of Jutland

Revenge was laid down at the Vickers shipyard in Barrow-in-Furness on 22 December 1913. She was launched on 29 May 1915 and was commissioned into the Grand Fleet on 1 February 1916, though she was not completed and ready for service until 24 March, with the time between her commissioning and completion including a period of sea trials. The ship cost a total of £2,406,368. On entering service, Revenge was assigned to the 6th Division of the 1st Battle Squadron (BS), Grand Fleet, along with the battleships Marlborough (the divisional and squadron flagship), Hercules, and Agincourt.

==== Battle of Jutland ====
In an attempt to lure out and destroy a portion of the Grand Fleet, the German High Seas Fleet with 16 dreadnoughts, six pre-dreadnoughts, six light cruisers and 31 torpedo boats commanded by Vice Admiral Reinhard Scheer, departed Jade Bight early on the morning of 31 May. The fleet sailed in concert with Rear Admiral Franz von Hipper's five battlecruisers and supporting cruisers and torpedo boats. The Royal Navy's Room 40 had intercepted and decrypted German radio traffic containing plans of the operation. The Admiralty ordered the Grand Fleet of 28 dreadnoughts and 9 battlecruisers, to sortie the night before to cut off and destroy the High Seas Fleet. On the day of the battle, Revenge and the rest of the 6th Division, 1st BS were stationed toward the rear of the British line.

Maps showing the manoeuvres of the British (blue) and German (red) fleets on 31 May – 1 June 1916

The initial action was fought primarily by the British and German battlecruiser formations in the afternoon, but by 18:00, (Note: The times used in this section are in UT.) the Grand Fleet approached the scene. Fifteen minutes later, Jellicoe gave the order to turn and deploy the fleet for action. The transition from their cruising formation caused congestion with the rear divisions, forcing Revenge and many of the other ships to reduce speed to 8 knots (15 km/h; 9.2 mph) to avoid colliding with each other. The German fleet quickly came into range and many British ships began to engage them starting at 18:17. The British ships initially had poor visibility and Revenge waited several minutes before opening fire at 18:22; her target during this period is unclear, and she may have engaged the crippled cruiser SMS Wiesbaden, the German battle line, or both. She fired intermittently for seventeen minutes and made no hits in the haze.

At 19:09, Revenge was forced to turn away to avoid a torpedo that was probably launched by the torpedo boat V48; the torpedo passed harmlessly in her wake. Shortly thereafter, she engaged the battlecruiser Derfflinger; her first salvo estimated the range to be 11,000 yards (10,000 m), but overshot the target. Revenge's gunlayers quickly brought the range down to 10,200 yards (9,300 m) and straddled Derfflinger with their second salvo. With the range found, Revenge quickly scored five hits before shifting fire to the battlecruiser Von der Tann, since other battleships were concentrating their fire on Derfflinger. Two of her hits on Derfflinger disabled her aft turrets; the other three caused less significant damage, with one of them passing through a funnel without exploding. Revenge hit Von der Tann once near her aft conning tower at 19:19, doing minor damage; she also fired a torpedo at the ship during this period that failed to hit.

Revenge had to turn away again at 19:35 to avoid a pair of torpedoes; she and the other members of the division turned again at 19:42 after reports of a submarine, which proved to be imaginary. Revenge saw no further contact with German forces, in large part due to torpedo damage incurred by the squadron flagship, Marlborough, that forced the ship to slow significantly. At 01:56 on 1 June, Vice-Admiral Cecil Burney, the squadron commander aboard Marlborough, informed Revenge that the damage would force him to transfer to Revenge to allow Marlborough to return to port. He boarded the light cruiser HMS Fearless, which carried him to Revenge shortly after 03:00. By 10:00, the 6th Division ships were still 45 nautical miles (83 km; 52 mi) to the north of the rest of the fleet. Revenge and the other two ships finally rejoined the fleet at 19:25 on the way back to Scapa Flow.

In the course of the battle, Revenge had fired 102 rounds from her main battery, all of which were of the armour-piercing, capped variety. She also fired 87 rounds from her secondary guns. She was not hit by any fire during the engagement.

==== Later operations ====
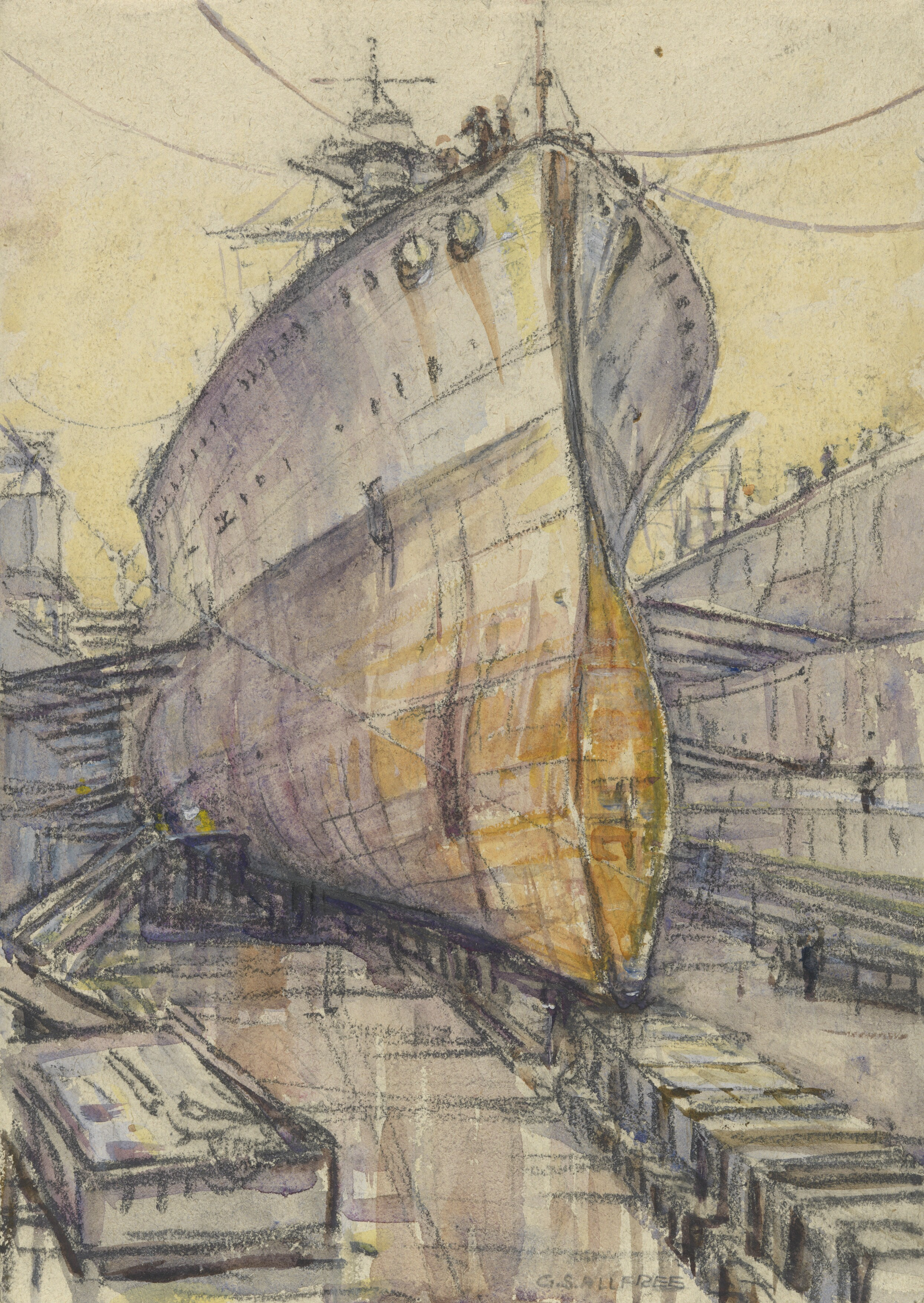
A sketch of Revenge in drydock, c. 1918

After the action of 19 August 1916, in which the Grand Fleet had lost two light cruisers to German U-boat attacks, Admiral John Jellicoe, the fleet commander, decided that the fleet should not be risked in such sorties unless the High Seas Fleet ventured north or the strategic situation warranted the risk. For its part, the German fleet remained in port or trained in the Baltic Sea through 1917, as both sides had largely abandoned the idea of a decisive surface battle in the North Sea. Both sides turned to positional warfare, laying fields of naval mines, and Germany resumed the unrestricted submarine warfare campaign early in the year. As a result, Revenge and the rest of the Grand Fleet saw no action during the last two years of the war.

In 1917, Britain began running regular convoys to Norway, escorted by light forces; the Germans raided these convoys twice late in the year, prompting Admiral David Beatty, who had replaced Jellicoe the previous year, to send battle squadrons of the Grand Fleet to escort the convoys. The High Seas Fleet went to sea on 23 April to attack one of the escorted convoys, but after the battlecruiser SMS Moltke suffered a serious mechanical accident the next day, the Germans were forced to break off the operation. Revenge and the rest of the Grand Fleet sortied on 24 April once they intercepted wireless signals from the damaged Moltke, but the Germans were too far ahead of the British, and no shots were fired.

On 21 November 1918, following the Armistice, the entire Grand Fleet left port to escort the surrendered German fleet into internment at Scapa Flow. At the time, Revenge was part of the 1st Battle Squadron, commanded by Vice-Admiral Sydney Fremantle, who made Revenge his flagship. The 1st BS was tasked with guarding the fleet while its fate was being determined at the peace treaty negotiations at the Versailles conference. After the Germans scuttled their fleet on 21 June 1919, Fremantle had the German commander, Rear Admiral Ludwig von Reuter, brought aboard Revenge. Fremantle accused Reuter of violating the terms of the armistice and had him and the German officers taken into captivity as prisoners of war.

=== Inter-war years ===
Throughout the 1920s and 1930s, Revenge typically operated with her sister ships, apart from periods where they were detached for refit or modernisation. In April 1919, the ships were transferred to the Atlantic Fleet, still as part of the 1st BS. They were then attached to the Mediterranean Fleet for operations in Turkey and the Black Sea as part of Britain's responses to the Greco-Turkish War and the Russian Civil War, respectively. On 19 July 1920, Revenge went to Panderma, where she encountered several vessels of the Greek Navy, including the armoured cruiser Georgios Averof, which had King Alexander of Greece aboard. Alexander visited Revenge and met with Fremantle later that day. Over the next day, Revenge assisted with Greek landings at Sultanköy and Eregli.

In August 1920, the ships returned to the Atlantic Fleet. The 1st and 2nd Battle Squadrons merged in May 1921, with Revenge and her four sisters forming the 1st Division and the five Queen Elizabeth-class battleships forming the 2nd Division. Revenge and three of her sisters were again sent to the Mediterranean Fleet in September 1922 during a crisis in Smyrna that culminated in the Great fire of Smyrna as the Greco-Turkish War came to its conclusion. The ships primarily operated in the Dardanelles and the Sea of Marmora. With the war over by November, the ships were free to return once again to the Atlantic Fleet.

On 1 November 1924, the Atlantic Fleet underwent a reorganisation that saw the Queen Elizabeth-class ships sent to the Mediterranean Fleet and the ships of the 1st Division reconstituted as the 1st Battle Squadron. Revenge and her sisters were transferred to the Mediterranean Fleet in August 1927. From January 1928 to January 1929, Revenge underwent a refit that included extensive modifications to her secondary and anti-aircraft batteries, fire control equipment, and rebuilding her bridge and aft superstructure, among other changes. She had another refit from May to December 1931 that saw further alterations to her anti-aircraft battery and fire control equipment.

In early 1935, the Revenge and Queen Elizabeth classes again swapped places, though by this time, the Atlantic Fleet had been renamed the Home Fleet. On 16 July, the ships were present during the fleet review at Spithead for King George V's silver jubilee. From July 1936 to March 1937, Revenge had another modernisation, which included the removal of the torpedo rangefinder and supporting tower. She and her sisters were present for the Coronation Review for George VI on 20 May 1937. A final pre-war refit began in early 1939 and concluded in August, which included a considerably strengthening of the anti-aircraft battery. On 9 August 1939 she was present during a fleet review for the king at Portland.

=== Second World War ===
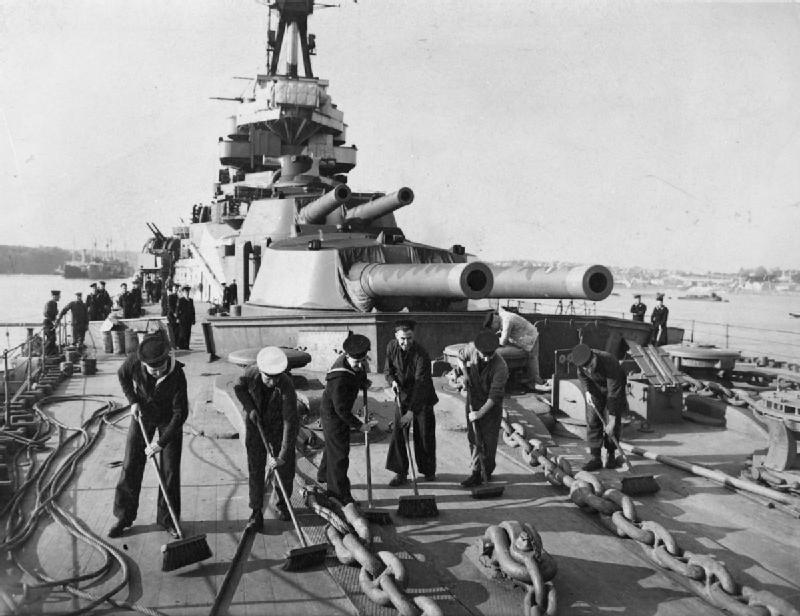
A wartime photograph of a working party scrubbing the deck of HMS Revenge's fo'c'sle.

==== In the Atlantic ====
On 3 September 1939 at the start of hostilities, Revenge formed part of the Channel Fleet based at Portland. Shortly after the outbreak of the war, the merchant ship SS Pakeha was disguised as HMS Revenge to deceive German aircraft. On 1 October Revenge was ordered to prepare to take up convoy escort duties in the South Atlantic, because of the threat posed by the German "pocket battleship", Admiral Graf Spee; however, on 5 October 1939, in a change of orders, she was attached to the North Atlantic Escort Force based at Halifax, Nova Scotia. Fulfilling another urgent need at the same time, Revenge and her sister Resolution were to carry gold bullion to Canada, which was needed by the Anglo-French Purchasing Board in New York, to pay for arms bought from the United States. 148 boxes of gold bars, worth a total of £2 million, were loaded onto each battleship at Portland; they departed on 7 October and arrived in Halifax nine days later. After escorting several convoys, Revenge was again used to transport gold, this time to a value of £10 million, departing from Plymouth on 28 January 1940. On 7 February, she collided with the British tanker SS Appalchee whilst Convoy HX19 was forming up off Halifax; although lightly damaged, she continued as an escort, returning to Halifax on 18 February for repair.

On 12 May 1940, she accidentally rammed and sank the Canadian Battle-class trawler HMCS Ypres which was acting as a boom defence vessel at Halifax, although without loss of life. For the remainder of her service in the war, whenever Revenge came to Halifax, the crews of other gate ships would make elaborate and exaggerated "Abandon Ship" manoeuvres in mockery. On 30 May, Revenge began to participate in Operation Fish, the removal of all of the United Kingdom's gold reserves to Canada, in case of invasion, leaving the River Clyde with £40 million worth of bullion on board, bound for Halifax. The battleship arrived at HM Dockyard, Devonport, on 22 June for a brief refit after escorting Convoy TC 5. On 3 July 1940, while at Plymouth, boarding parties from Revenge took control of the Paris and the large submarine-cruiser Surcouf, in case their crews decided to return them to Vichy France where they might fall into the hands of the Germans. One sailor boarding Surcouf was killed during the operation. On the following day, Revenge resumed ferrying gold, this time with a cargo worth £47 million, repeating this on 11 August with £14.5 million from Greenock.

On 15 September, Revenge arrived in Plymouth where she came under the control of Western Approaches Command, in case of an invasion. If the German amphibious landing ( Operation Sealion) had gone ahead as planned, Revenge would have been the only British capital ship in the English Channel area, but, unknown to the British high command, Adolf Hitler had ordered on 17 September that the invasion be postponed indefinitely. In the early hours of 11 October, Revenge formed the main element of Operation Medium, which aimed to bombard transport ships and barges for the still-expected invasion that were still concentrated in the French port of Cherbourg. Revenge, six destroyers and a screen of motor gun boats formed the striking force, while a covering force of three cruisers and six destroyers patrolled to prevent German naval forces from interfering. There was a simultaneous air raid by RAF Bomber Command which also dropped flares to illuminate the target. During the 18-minute bombardment, Revenge fired 120 main-gun shells at the harbour while her escorts fired 801 rounds from their 4.7-inch guns. The British force came under accurate fire from German heavy coastal artillery but was able to retire undamaged. Revenge managed to make 21.5 knots on the return journey. On 13 November 1940, she resumed North Atlantic convoy duties, which continued without major incident well into 1941.

==== With the Eastern Fleet ====
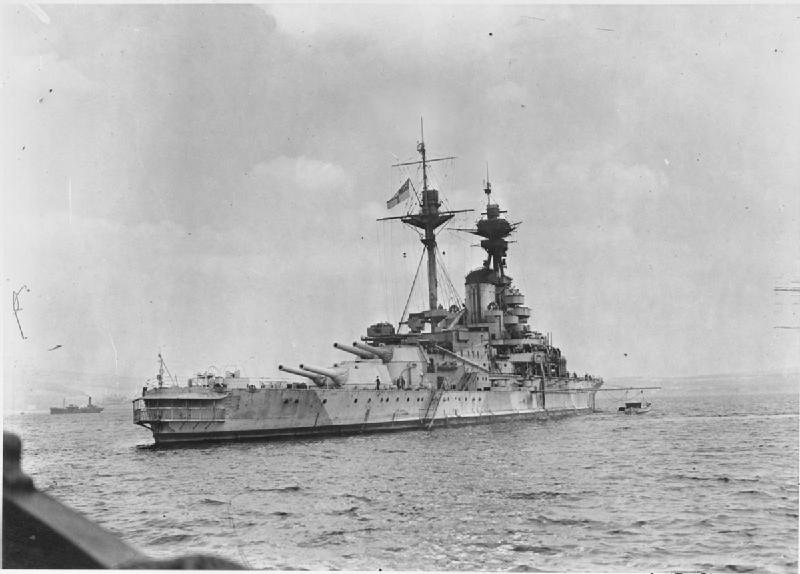
HMS Revenge at Greenock after her return from the Indian Ocean in September 1943.

In October 1941, the Admiralty decided the ship was to be transferred to the 3rd Battle Squadron, which was to be based in Colombo, Ceylon; she was joined there by her three surviving sisters (Royal Oak had been sunk in October 1939). The unit was established in December, with the squadron attached to Force F. With the start of the Pacific War on 7 December, naval forces were necessary in the Indian Ocean to protect British India. By the end of March 1942, the Eastern Fleet had been formed, under the command of Admiral James Somerville. Despite the numerical strength of the Eastern Fleet, many of its units, including the four Revenge-class battleships, were no longer front-line warships. Vice Admiral Chūichi Nagumo's powerful Kido Butai, composed of six carriers and four fast battleships, was significantly stronger than Somerville's Eastern Fleet. Due to this only the modernised battleship Warspite could operate with the two fleet carriers; Revenge, her three sisters, and the carrier Hermes were kept away from combat to escort convoys in the Indian Ocean.

In late March, the code-breakers at the Far East Combined Bureau, a branch of Bletchley Park, informed Somerville that the Japanese were planning a raid into the Indian Ocean to attack Colombo and Trincomalee and destroy his fleet. He therefore divided his fleet into two groups: Force A, which consisted of the two fleet carriers, Warspite and four cruisers, and Force B, centred on Revenge and her sisters and Hermes. He intended to ambush Nagumo's fleet in a night action, the only method by which he thought he could achieve a victory. After three days of unsuccessful searching for the Japanese fleet, Somerville returned to Addu Atoll to refuel. While refuelling, Somerville received a report that the Japanese fleet was approaching Colombo, which they attacked the following day, 5 April, followed by attacks on Trincomalee on 9 April. Following the 5 April raid, Somerville withdrew Revenge and her three sisters to Mombasa, where they could secure the shipping routes in the Middle East and the Persian Gulf. The four Revenges departed from Addu Atoll early on the morning of 9 April, bound for Mombasa; they remained based there into 1943. Thereafter, the Revenge-class ships were based in Kilindini Harbour, and escorted convoys. The ship underwent a further refit in Durban from October to November 1942. In February 1943, Revenge and Resolution escorted the Operation Pamphlet convoy that carried the 9th Australian Division from Egypt back to Australia.

==== Fate ====
In mid-1943, the poor condition of the ship—which had become apparent as early as 1936, but could not be remedied due to the outbreak of the war—prompted the Admiralty to recall her to Britain to be withdrawn from service. She arrived in the Clyde on 31 September, where she was reduced to reserve status for the rest of the war. The ship's electrical system was in very poor condition and needed a thorough overhaul, and her hull was badly stressed from years of heavy use. Although in reserve, the ship was used to carry Prime Minister Winston Churchill part of the way to the Tehran Conference in November and December. In January 1944, she was transferred to the Portsmouth Command, based in Southampton; she remained there, out of use, until 17 December, when she was converted into a training ship for boiler room personnel, part of the training establishment HMS Imperieuse. During the period of inactivity, in May 1944, her main armament was removed to provide spare guns for the battleships Ramillies and Warspite and for monitors, which were to be vital during the bombardment of the beaches of Normandy during Operation Overlord.

In March 1948, she was placed on the disposal list, being sold for scrap in July to the British Iron & Steel Co.; she was then sent to ship breakers Thos. W. Ward to be broken up at Inverkeithing, where she arrived on 5 September. Some of Revenge's gun-turret rack and pinion gearing was reused in the 76-metre (250 ft) diameter Mark I radio telescope built at Jodrell Bank, Cheshire, in the mid-1950s, along with equipment from Royal Sovereign.

== See also ==
- Claude Choules, the last living British First World War veteran, served aboard Revenge during the Great War.
