= HMCS Stadacona =

Patrol boat of the Royal Canadian Navy

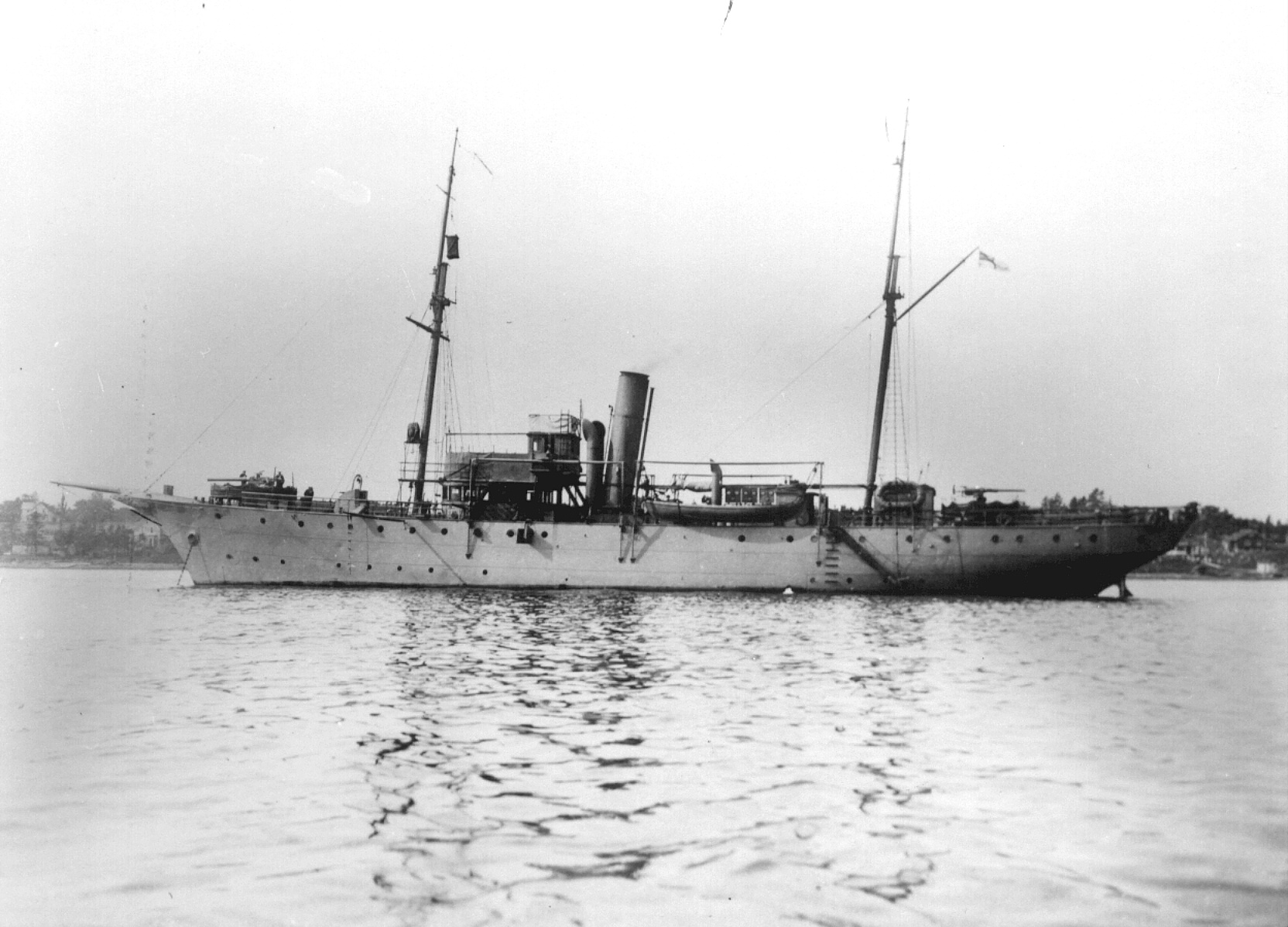
- Stadacona in Royal Canadian Navy service

History
- Name: Columbia
- Port of registry: (United States) New York
- Builder: Crescent Shipyard, Elizabeth
- Launched: 1899
- Fate: Acquired by Royal Canadian Navy, 1915

Canada
- Name: Stadacona
- Namesake: Stadacona
- Acquired: 1915
- Commissioned: 13 August 1915
- Decommissioned: 31 March 1920
- Renamed: Kuyakuzmt, 1924; Lady Stimson, 1929; Moonlight Maid
- Fate: Sold, 1924; Burned for salvage, 1948

General characteristics
- Type: Armed yacht
- Tonnage: 682 GRT, 349 NRT
- Length: 196.4 ft (59.9 m) overall; 179.4 ft (54.7 m)
- Beam: 33.6 ft (10.2 m)
- Draught: 11 ft (3.4 m)
- Depth: 20.1 ft (6.1 m)
- Installed power: 102 NHP
- Propulsion: 1 × triple-expansion engine; 1 × screw
- Speed: 12 knots (22 km/h)
- Complement: 62
- Armament: 1 x 4 in (102 mm) gun

HMCS Stadacona was a commissioned patrol boat of the Royal Canadian Navy (RCN) that served in the First World War, and postwar until 1920. Before entering RCN service, she was the private steam yacht Columbia. After the war, Stadacona made hydrographic surveys. The vessel was sold for commercial use in 1920 and was burned for salvage in 1948. Stadacona is a historic name associated with Canada, the voyages Jacques Cartier, the colony of Samuel de Champlain, and Quebec City.

== Origins ==
The vessel was built by Crescent Shipyard, Elizabeth, New Jersey as the American steam yacht Columbia, the second yacht of that name built for J. Harvey Ladew of New York, and modeled on the United States Coast Survey steamer Pathfinder that had been built in the same yard. (Note: There has been confusion between the two yachts. The first of 1894 was built by Cramp Shipbuilding and later commissioned by the United States Navy in 1898 as USS Wasp—before the second was completed at Crescent. The Dictionary of American Naval Fighting Ships gives an erroneous 1898 build date along with an 11 April 1898 commissioning date for the Cramp Shipbuilding Columbia when contemporary accounts clearly show the second yacht is still being built in 1899. To complicate matters further, the article here uses the commissioning date to distinguish the vessel while the data shows construction starting five years.) Possible conversion into a naval auxiliary was a part of the design with coal-fired triple-expansion steam engines, capable of a guaranteed 14 knots (26 km/h; 16 mph), allowing for steaming range of 7,000 miles (11,265 km) and a sail plan allowing even longer ranges.

She was acquired by Aemilius Jarvis on behalf of the RCN in July 1915 along with the yacht Waterus from the New York shipbrokers Cox and Stevens for $155,000. (The sales were blocked by the then-neutral US government, and prolific champion yachtsman Commodore Jarvis subsequently had to sneak the ships from the US to Canada.) Columbia was renamed Stadacona, after a small Iroquois village which had previously occupied the site of Quebec City.

== Canadian service ==
Stadacona was one of a number of American private yachts acquired by the RCN during the First World War. The vessel was commissioned into the RCN on 13 August 1915. Stadacona was then sent to the Canadian Vickers shipyard in Montreal, Quebec to fit out. The vessel was given one 4-inch (102 mm) gun forward and a 12-pounder gun was added aft later in the war. The vessel then sailed to Sydney, Nova Scotia to begin her career as a patrol vessel in September. In 1916 Stadacona was among the vessels assigned to patrol the Cabot Strait. The vessel became flagship of the Canada's East Coast fleet based at Halifax under Vice Admiral Sir Charles Coke on 30 April 1916. Stadacona remained flagship of the fleet after Walter Hose took over command from Sir Charles Coke on 14 August. In August 1918 the German U-boat U-156 captured the fishing trawler Triumph off the East Coast of Canada. Using the trawler to get close to the Atlantic fishing fleets, the Germans sank several Canadian and American fishing trawlers. Stadacona was among the vessels dispatched to deal with the submarine. However, the Germans scuttled Triumph once the fishing trawler ran out of fuel.

In early 1919 Stadacona, accompanied by a number of Battle-class trawlers, was sent to the west coast via the Panama Canal. She served as a dispatch vessel until being paid off on 31 March 1920, and transferred to government service. The vessel was then used primarily used for hydrographic surveys and occasionally for fisheries patrol along the west coast until sold in 1924.

== Sale and subsequent career ==
Sold in 1924, Stadacona became the West Coast rum running depot ship Kuyakuzmt during Prohibition before being rebuilt in 1929 at Vancouver as the yacht Lady Stimson. In 1931 the yacht was converted to a tugboat and renamed Moonlight Maid. (Note: The sources disagree on when the vessel became a tugboat, with the Miramar Ship Index stating 1931 and Macpherson & Barrie, 1941.) During World War II the tugboat was acquired by the United States Army and converted to a cargo vessel in 1942 and operated as the coastal freighter, US Army FS-539. In 1948, she was burned for salvage at Seattle, Washington and broken up by Foss Launch & Tug Co.

== See also ==
- HMCS Stadacona was also the name of an RCN shore establishment in Halifax, Nova Scotia.

== Bibliography ==
- Bumsted, J.M. (2003). Canada's Diverse Peoples: A Reference Sourcebook. Santa Barbara, CA: ABC-CLIO. ISBN 9-781-57607-673-6.
- Colton, T. (30 September 2014). "Bethlehem Steel Company, Elizabethport NJ". shipbuildinghistory.com. Archived from the original on 2 April 2015.
- Colton, T. (30 September 2014). "Cramp Shipbuilding, Philadelphia PA". shipbuildinghistory.com. Archived from the original on 20 December 2014.
- Grover, David (1987). US Army Ships and Watercraft of World War II. Annapolis, Maryland: Naval Institute Press. ISBN 0-87021-766-6. LCCN 87015514.
- Johnston, William; Rawling, William G.P.; Gimblett, Richard H. & MacFarlane, John (2010). The Seabound Coast: The Official History of the Royal Canadian Navy, 1867–1939. Vol. 1. Toronto: Dundurn Press. ISBN 978-1-55488-908-2.
- Macpherson, Ken & Barrie, Ron (2002). The Ships of Canada's Naval Forces 1910–2002 (Third ed.). St. Catharines, ON: Vanwell Publishing. ISBN 1-55125-072-1.
- Maginley, Charles D. & Collin, Bernard (2001). The Ships of Canada's Marine Services. St. Catharines, ON: Vanwell Publishing Limited. ISBN 1-55125-070-5.
- Marine Engineering (1899). "Note". Marine Engineering. 3 (February 1899). New York: Marine Engineering Incorporated: 21.
- "Columbia (2127364)". Miramar Ship Index.
- Railroad Gazette (1899). "The Crescent Shipyard". Railroad Gazette. 43 (30 June 1899). New York: 467–468.
