= List of Royal Canadian Navy ships of the First World War =

Ensign of the Royal Canadian Navy during the First World War

With the outbreak of war, Great Britain and Canada planned to significantly expand the RCN. Government and commercial vessels were pressed into naval service, vessels were transferred, loaned or purchased from the Royal Navy, and many smaller vessels were constructed in Canada. The List of Royal Canadian Navy ships of the First World War lists the surface warships, submarines and auxiliary vessels in service during the war. It includes all commissioned, non-commissioned, loaned or hired ships. and all ships crewed by RCN personnel under the command of the RCN.

== Surface vessels ==
=== Cruisers ===
- HMCS Rainbow (Apollo class) (P)
- HMCS Niobe (Diadem class)
- HMCS Aurora (Arethusa class)

=== Destroyers ===
- HMCS Patriot (Thornycroft M class)
- HMCS Patrician (Thornycroft M class)

=== Naval trawlers ===
- HMCS Arleux (Battle class)
- HMCS Armentières (Battle class)
- HMCS Arras (Battle class)
- HMCS Festubert (Battle class)
- HMCS Givenchy (Battle class)
- HMCS Loos (Battle class)
- HMCS Messines (Battle class)
- HMCS St. Eloi (Battle class)
- HMCS St. Julien (Battle class)
- HMCS Thiepval (Battle class)
- HMCS Vimy (Battle class)
- HMCS Ypres (Battle class)

=== Naval drifters ===
- HMCS CD 4 *(CD class)
- HMCS CD 9 *
- HMCS CD 10 *
- HMCS CD 13 *
- HMCS CD 14 *
- HMCS CD 15 *
- HMCS CD 16 *
- HMCS CD 17 *
- HMCS CD 18 *
- HMCS CD 19 *
- HMCS CD 20 *
- HMCS CD 21 *
- HMCS CD 22 *
- HMCS CD 23 *
- HMCS CD 24 *
- HMCS CD 25 *
- HMCS CD 26 *
- HMCS CD 27 *
- HMCS CD 28 *
- HMCS CD 29 *
- CD 30 (transferred to USN)
- CD 31 (transferred to USN)
- HMCS CD 32 (transferred to USN)*
- HMCS CD 33 (transferred to USN)*
- HMCS CD 34 (transferred to USN)*
- HMCS CD 35 (transferred to USN)*
- CD 36 (transferred to USN)
- HMCS CD 37 *
- HMCS CD 38 *
- HMCS CD 39 *
- HMCSCD 40 *
- CD 41 (transferred to USN)
- HMCS CD 42 *
- HMCS CD 46 (transferred to USN)
- HMCS CD 48 *
- HMCS CD 49 *
- CD 50 (transferred to USN)
- HMCS CD 51 *
- HMCS CD 53 *
- CD 58 (transferred to USN)
- CD 59 (transferred to USN)
- CD 61 (transferred to USN)
- CD 65 (transferred to USN)
- CD 67 (transferred to USN)
- HMCS CD 68 *
- HMCS CD 73 *
- HMCS CD 74 *
- CD 78 (transferred to USN)
- HMCS CD 79 *
- HMCS CD 85 *
- HMCS CD 87 *
- CD 94 (transferred to USN)
- CD 96 (transferred to USN)
- CD 97 (transferred to USN)
- CD 98 (transferred to USN)
- CD 99 (transferred to USN)
- CD 100 (transferred to USN)

*(RCN drifters according to the RN and Canadian Navy Lists. Others went to RN and USN. Secondary sources do not agree on the number and disposition of these vessels.)

=== Minesweepers ===
- HMCS Constance
- HMCS Curlew
- HMCS P.V. I (PV type)
- HMCS P.V. II (PV type)
- HMCS P.V. III (PV type)
- HMCS P.V. IV (PV type)
- HMCS P.V. V (PV type)
- HMCS P.V. VI (PV type)
- HMCS P.V. VII (PV type)
- HMCS TR 1 (Castle class TR series)
- HMCS TR 2 (Castle class)
- HMCS TR 3 (Castle class)
- HMCS TR 4 (Castle class)
- HMCS TR 5 (Castle class)
- HMCS TR 6 (Castle class)
- HMCS TR 7 (Castle class)
- HMCS TR 8 (Castle class)
- HMCS TR 9 (Castle class)
- HMCS TR 10 (Castle class)
- HMCS TR 11 (Castle class)
- HMCS TR 12 (Castle class)
- HMCS TR 13 (Castle class)
- HMCS TR 14 (Castle class)
- HMCS TR 15 (Castle class)
- HMCS TR 16 (Castle class)
- HMCS TR 17 (Castle class)
- HMCS TR 18 (Castle class)
- HMCS TR 19 (Castle class)
- HMCS TR 20 (Castle class)
- HMCS TR 21 (Castle class)
- HMCS TR 22 (Castle class)
- HMCS TR 23 (Castle class)
- HMCS TR 24 (Castle class)
- HMCS TR 25 (Castle class)
- HMCS TR 26 (Castle class)
- HMCS TR 27 (Castle class)
- HMCS TR 28 (Castle class)
- HMCS TR 29 (Castle class)
- HMCS TR 30 (Castle class)
- HMCS TR 31 (Castle class)
- HMCS TR 32 (Castle class)
- HMCS TR 33 (Castle class)
- HMCS TR 34 (Castle class)
- HMCS TR 35 (Castle class)
- HMCS TR 36 (Castle class)
- HMCS TR 37 (Castle class)
- HMCS TR 38 (Castle class)
- HMCS TR 39 (Castle class)
- HMCS TR 46 (Castle class)
- HMCS TR 47 (Castle class)
- HMCS TR 48 (Castle class)
- HMCS TR 49 (Castle class)
- HMCS TR 50 (Castle class)
- HMCS TR 51 (Castle class)
- HMCS TR 52 (Castle class)
- HMCS TR 53 (Castle class)
- HMCS TR 54 (Castle class)
- HMCS TR 55 (Castle class)
- HMCS TR 56 (Castle class)
- HMCS TR 57 (Castle class)
- HMCS TR 58 (Castle class)
- HMCS TR 59 (Castle class)
- HMCS TR 60 (Castle class)

=== Torpedo boats ===
- HMCS Tuna (ex-Tarantula)

== Submarines ==
- HMCS CC-1 (CC class) (P)
- HMCS CC-2 (CC class) (P)
- HMCS CH-14 (H class)
- HMCS CH-15 (H class)

== Auxiliary vessels ==
=== Icebreakers ===
- CGS Earl Grey
- CGS Minto
- CGS Stanley

=== Training vessels ===
- HMCS Arthur W

=== Motor launches ===
- Adelaide
- Alase
- Alva and May
- Amos B.
- Atlantic
- Fantom
- Foam (late Spray)
- Icthus M.
- Lilly
- Lillian
- Maude Mosher
- Meredith
- Mildred
- Mohawk
- Paragon
- Rambler
- Roanoke
- Roamer
- Rose
- Rover
- Ruth
- Shark
- Shamrock
- Swan
- Thistle
- Virginia

=== Patrol boats ===
- HMCS Acadia (2)
- Albacore
- HMCS Algerine (later, depot ship)
- Frank T. Coote
- Atlanta (III)
- CGS Bayfield
- HMCS Canada
- Deliverance
- HMCS Florence
- HMCS Galiano
- Grib
- HMCS Grilse (ex-Winchester)
- HMCS Gulnare
- HMCS Hochelaga
- HMCS Lady Evelyn
- HMCS Lansdowne
- HMCS Laurentian
- HMCS Malaspina
- HMCS Margaret
- HMCS Newington (minelayer)
- HMCS Petrel
- HMCS Premier
- HMCS Restless
- HMCS Sable I
- HMCS Seagull
- HMCS Sinmac
- HMCS Stadacona

=== Survey vessels ===
- Karluk
- CGS Chrissie C. Thomey
- Gladiator
- CGS La Canadienne
- CGS Mary Sachs
- CGS North Star (III)

=== Tenders ===
- Davy Jones
- Egret (I)
- Holly Leaf
- Ivy Leaf
- Laurel Leaf
- HMCS Shearwater (P)
- Tannis
- Valiant (I)
- Viking (ex-CGS Viking)
- Viner

=== Tugs ===
- Alaska (II)
- C.E. Tanner
- Coastguard
- G.S. Mayes
- Gwennith
- Highland Mary (I)
- Ruth (II)
- Shark (ex-Nereid (II))
- Trusty
- M.W. Weatherspoon
- C. Wilfred

=== Other ===
- CGS Alaska
- Berthier (examination vessel)
- Speedy (II) (examination vessel)
- HMCS Gate Vessel 3 (ex-W.H. Lee)
- HMCS Gopher (auxiliary minesweeper)
- HMCS Musquash (auxiliary minesweeper)
- CGS Vigilant (cruiser, third class)
- Falcon
- CGS Kestrel
- HMCS Naden (depot ship)
- Ruth (I)
- Ruth (IV)
- Scotsman

== See also ==
- Royal Canadian Navy
- Origins of the Royal Canadian Navy
- History of the Royal Canadian Navy
- List of ships of the Royal Canadian Navy
- Hull classification symbol (Canada)
- His Majesty's Canadian Ship
- List of aircraft of the Royal Canadian Navy
- List of Royal Canadian Navy ships of the Second World War
- List of Royal Canadian Navy ships of the Cold War

== Bibliography and further reading ==
- Blatherwick, F.J. (1992). Royal Canadian Navy honours, decorations, medals, 1910–1968. FJB Air Publications, New Westminster.
- The Canadian Navy List 1914 to 1945. King's Printer, Ottawa.
- Colledge, J. J.; Warlow, Ben (2006) [1969]. Ships of the Royal Navy: The Complete Record of All Fighting Ships of the Royal Navy from the 15th Century to the Present (3rd Rev ed.). London: Chatham Publishing. ISBN 978-1-86176-281-8. OCLC 67375475.
- Dittmar, F.J.; College, J.J. (1972). British Warships, 1914–1919. Alan, London.
- Gimblett, Richard H., ed. (2009). The Naval Service of Canada 1910–2010: The Centennial Story. Toronto: Dundurn Press. ISBN 978-1-4597-1322-2.
- Gimblett, Richard H.; Hadley, Michael L., eds. (2010). Citizen Sailors: Chronicles of Canada's Naval Reserve. Toronto: Dundurn Press. ISBN 978-1-55488-867-2.
- Johnston, William; Rawling, William G.P.; Gimblett, Richard H.; MacFarlane, John (2010). The Seabound Coast: The Official History of the Royal Canadian Navy, 1867–1939. Vol. 1. Toronto: Dundurn Press. ISBN 978-1-55488-908-2.
- Macpherson, Ken; Barrie, Ron (2002). The Ships of Canada's Naval Forces 1910–2002 (Third ed.). St. Catharines, Ontario: Vanwell Publishing. ISBN 1-55125-072-1.
- Milner, Marc (2010). Canada's Navy: The First Century (Second ed.). Toronto: University of Toronto Press. ISBN 978-0-8020-9604-3.
- Office of Naval Intelligence (1944). Index to Warships of the British Commonwealth (PDF). US Government Printing Office.
- Tucker, Gilbert (1952). The Naval Service of Canada : Its Official History Vol 2, Activities on Shore During the Second World War. King's Printer, Ottawa.
