= Messines =

Messines may refer to:

- Mesen (in French: Messines), a village in Belgium
  - Battle of Messines (disambiguation), World War I battles
- Messines, Quebec, a municipality in Canada
- São Bartolomeu de Messines, a village in Portugal
- Messines, Queensland, a settlement in Passchendaele, Australia
- HMCS Messines, one of twelve Battle-class naval trawlers used by the Royal Canadian Navy
