= Karluk (ship) =

Canadian Arctic exploration ship

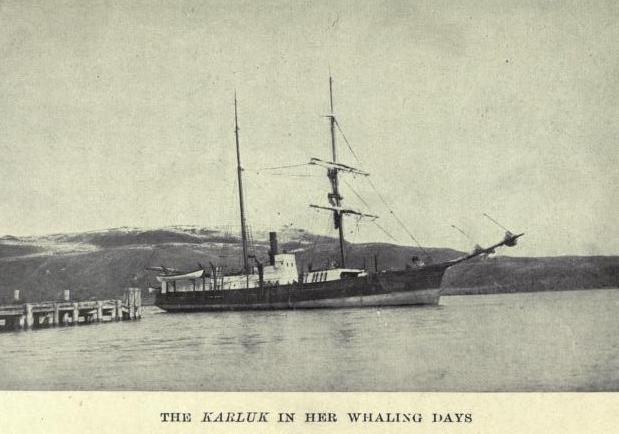
- Karluk, leaving harbour during her career as a whaler

History

Canada
- Name: Karluk
- Builder: Matthew Turner's shipyard, Benicia, California
- Launched: 1884
- Acquired: (by Canadian government) 1913
- Out of service: 1912
- Fate: Crushed by pack ice in the Arctic Ocean, January 1914
- Notes: US registry New York (1913 prior to Canadian service), San Francisco

General characteristics
- Type: Brigantine
- Tonnage: 321 GRT; 208 NRT
- Length: 125.6 ft (38.3 m)
- Beam: 27 ft (8.2 m)
- Draught: 16.5 ft (5.0 m)
- Depth: 14.2 ft (4.3 m)
- Decks: 2
- Ice class: sheathed
- Installed power: 175 ihp (130 kW)
- Propulsion: Coal fired steam and sail
- Sail plan: brigantine
- Speed: 10 knots (19 km/h; 12 mph)
- Notes: Canadian Registration

Karluk was an American-built brigantine which, after many years' service as a whaler, was acquired by the Canadian government in 1913 to act as flagship to the Canadian Arctic Expedition. While on her way to the expedition's rendezvous at Herschel Island, Karluk became trapped in the Arctic pack ice and, after drifting for several months, was crushed and sank in January 1914. Of the 25 aboard (crew and expedition staff), eleven died, either during the attempts to reach land by marching over the ice, or after arrival at the temporary refuge of Wrangel Island.

== Ship history ==
Karluk was built in 1884, at Matthew Turner's shipyard, Benicia, California, as a tender for the Alaska salmon fishery industry (karluk is the Alutiiq word for "fish"). She was 129 ft (39 m) in length with a beam of 23 ft (7.0 m), and 321 gross register tonnage, 247 net register tonnage powered by sail and a 150 hp auxiliary coal-fired compound steam engine. In 1892 Karluk was converted for use as a whaler, when her bows and sides were sheathed with 2-inch (51 mm) Australian ironwood. She completed 14 whaling trips, the last of which was in 1911.

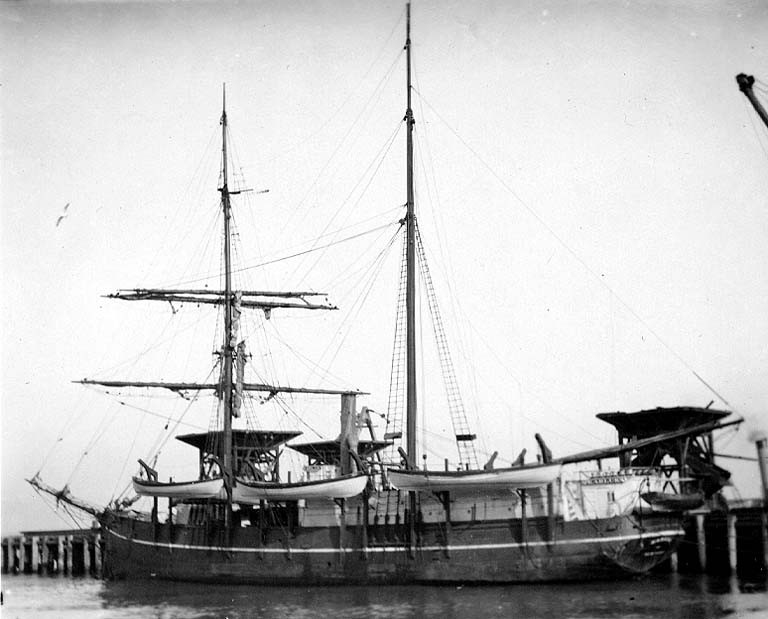
Whaling steamer Karluk docked in 1913

For her role in the Canadian Arctic Expedition, Karluk had been acquired by expedition leader Vilhjalmur Stefansson in 1913 for the bargain price of $10,000, and sold at cost to the Canadian government when it assumed overall responsibility for the expedition. Robert Bartlett, appointed Karluk's captain for the expedition, was concerned about the ship's fitness for the task, believing that she had not been built to withstand sustained ice pressure, and that she lacked the engine power to force a passage through the ice. Even after refitting, the engine had a habit of breaking down. Karluk's chief engineer, John Munro, described it as a "coffee pot of an engine...never [i]ntended to run more than two days at a time."

== Designation ==
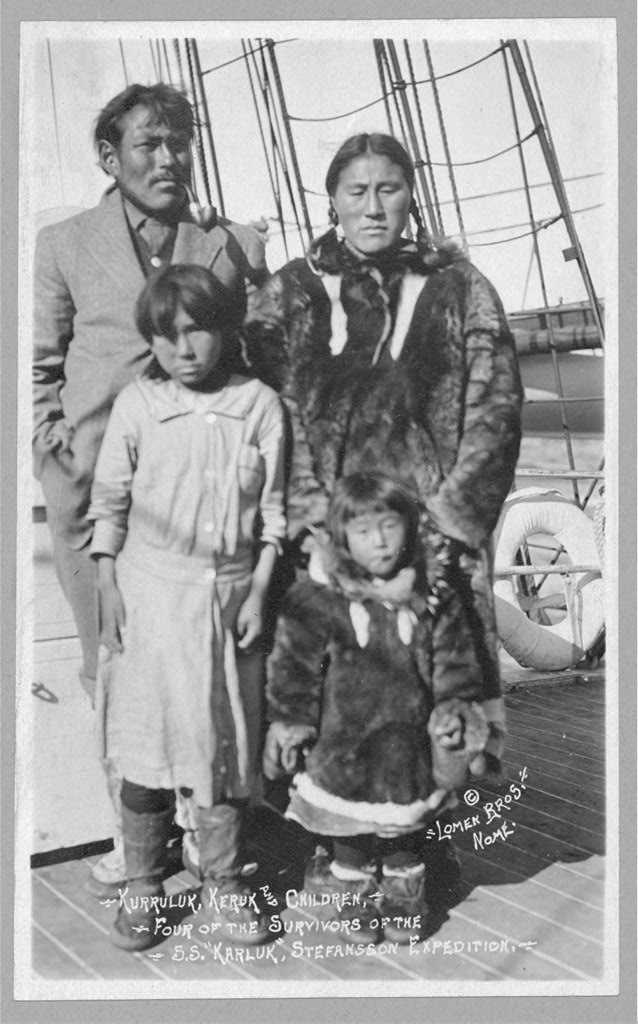
Kurruluk, Keruk and children, four of the survivors of the SS Karluk Stefansson's Canadian Arctic Expedition

Several designations have been applied to the ship after her acquisition by the Canadian government, including "HMCS" (His Majesty's Canadian Ship), "DGS" (Dominion Government Ship), and "CGS" (Canadian Government Ship). It is not clear whether the "HMCS" designation was formal or informal; HMCS is used for Royal Canadian Navy ships. Although Karluk sailed under a civilian captain and crew, she flew the Canadian Blue Ensign, the jack of the Royal Canadian Navy.

There is also a great deal to support the application of the "CGS" designation. Contemporary government documents refer to the ship as either CGS Karluk or simply Karluk, at the same time the government would clearly refer to the "HMCS" designation of HMCS Niobe and HMCS Rainbow in similar official documents. Furthermore, the other principal ship of the expedition, CGS Alaska carried the "CGS" designation. This designation was also carried by CGS Arctic.

== Last voyage ==
Karluk sailed from Nome, Alaska on 13 July 1913, heading for Herschel Island where she was to meet up with the expedition's other vessels. On 13 August, still more than 200 miles (320 km) from her destination, she became trapped in the pack ice and began a slow drift, generally in a westerly direction away from Herschel Island. On 19 September Stefansson and other members of the expedition staff left the ship for a ten-day hunting trip. While they were gone the ice, carrying Karluk with it, began to drift more rapidly westward, so that Stefansson and his party were unable to return to the ship. They made their way overland to Cape Smythe, near Point Barrow. Meanwhile Karluk continued drifting, under constant dangers from the pressures of the ice. On 10 January 1914 she was holed; she took on water steadily and sank the next day. All 25 persons aboard – crew, expedition staff and Inuit hunters – transferred to the ice. After several weeks in a temporary ice camp they began efforts to reach the nearest land, Wrangel Island. An advance party of four lost their way on the march and were found dead on Herald Island years later. Another party of four, including British explorer James Murray, detached themselves from the expedition and attempted to reach land independently; they were never seen again. Of the 17 who reached the island, three died before rescue arrived in September 1914.

== See also ==
- Canadian Arctic Expedition 1913–16

== Sources ==
- "American Offshore Whaling Voyages: a database". Mystic Seaport. November 2, 2016. (search ship "Karluk")
- Annual List of Merchant Vessels of the United States (1913). Washington DC: US Department of the Treasury. 1913.
- Appleton, Thomas. "A History of the Canadian Coast Guard and Marine Services". Canadian Coast Guard.
- Bartlett, Robert; Ralph Hale (1916). The Last Voyage of the Karluk. Toronto: McLelland, Goodchild and Stewart.
- Diubaldo, Richard J (1998). Stefansson and the Canadian Arctic. Montreal: McGill-Queen's Press. ISBN 0-7735-1815-0.
- McConnell, Burt (September 15, 1914). "Got Karluk's Men As Hope Was Dim" (PDF). The New York Times. New York.
- McKinlay, William Laird (1976). Karluk: The great untold story of Arctic exploration. London: Weidenfeld & Nicolson. ISBN 0-297-77164-7.
- Niven, Jennifer (2001). The Ice Master. London: Pan Books. ISBN 0-330-39123-2.
- Stefansson, Vilhjalmur (1921). The Friendly Arctic. New York: The Macmillan Company.
