= Franklin Bates Polson =

- Born: February 10, 1858; Port Hope, Canada West
- Died: October 28, 1907 (aged 49); Toronto, Ontario
- Occupation: Shipyard owner

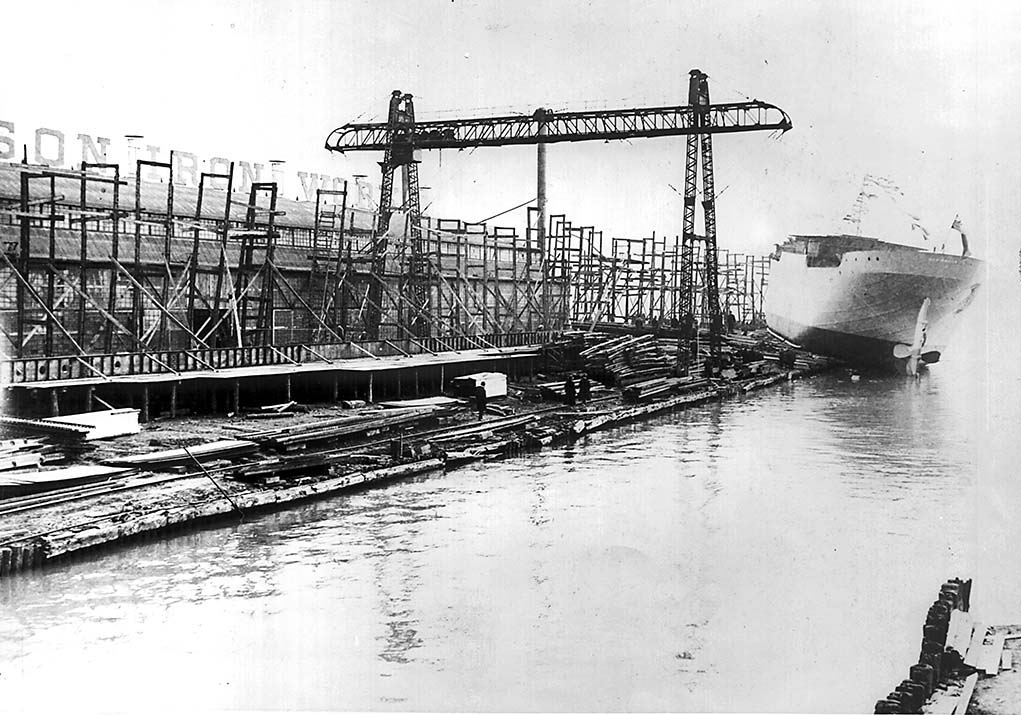
Launching a ship at the Polson Iron Works shipyard

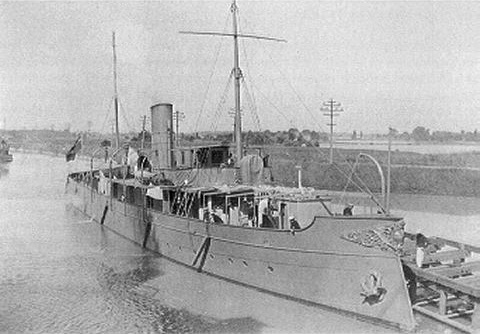
Polson's firm built the CGS Vigilant, the first armed vessel to be built in Canada.

Franklin Bates Polson was a Canadian machinist and engineer, and co-founder with his father of the prominent Canadian shipbuilding firm the Polson Iron Works.

Like his father William Polson, Franklin Bates Polson became a machinist and engineer, working for several Canadian railroads, until he and his father founded their shipbuilding firm in 1883. William Polson was the first President, and Franklin Bates Polson was the Secretary-Treasurer. Their firm built more than one hundred vessels, and built steam engines including for river boats constructed from local wood for service on rivers in Canada's then undeveloped west. Their firm built the Manitoba, said to be the first steel-hulled ship built in Canada, and the largest ship to sail on fresh-water. Their firm introduced the technique of designing vessels that could be disassembled. Vessels that were to serve on rivers in Western Canada were first assembled in the Polson shipyard, and then disassembled into sections that were small enough to fit on railway flatcars, for shipment to a landing on the river they were to service, for a second assembly and launch.

In 1890 he became a director of the Parry Sound Lumber Company and the Parry Sound Navigation Company. The President of the Lumber Company, John Bellamy Miller, became an investor in the Iron Works. Miller in turn became a director of the Iron Works in 1892. Miller would eventually become the senior partner and President of the Polson Iron Works.

The Polson Iron Works first shipyard was in Toronto, south of The Esplanade, between Sherbourne and Frederick. In 1888 the firm opened a second shipyard, on Lake Huron, at Owen Sound, a small yet growing city, with a railway connection. Owen Sound offered the firm an exemption from property tax.

By 1895 Owen Sound City Council were reluctant to renew the property tax exemption, market conditions in the shipbuilding industry had changed, and the firm closed its Owen Sound location.

Polson felt that the federal government was unfairly subsidizing the railroad industry, and that comparable subsidies should be offered to the shipping and shipbuilding industries. His efforts to lobby Ottawa were generally unsuccessful, with the exception of his efforts to court Joseph-Israël Tarte, the Canadian Minister of Public Works. Tarte commissioned the first of a series of dredges to enhance navigation of the St Lawrence River.

During Polson's lifetime the firm built the CGS Vigilant, said to be the first Canada's first Canadian built armed vessel.

Although Polson had a bout of typhoid fever, his sudden death at a relatively young age was unexpected.

Polson’s son with second wife was architect Franklin Murray Polson (1903-1978).
