= SS Bigwin =

1909 steamship ferry in Lake of Bays, Ontario

History

Canada
- Name: SS Bigwin
- Owner: James Kuhn & G. J. Gibson (1910-1924); Huntsville & Lake of Bays Navigation Co. (1924-1945); Bigwin Boat Livery Co. (1945-1960); Bigwin Inn Resort (1960-1970); Lake of Bays Marine Museum (2002)
- Operator: Lake of Bays Marine Museum
- Port of registry: Canada
- Ordered: 1909
- Builder: Polson Iron Works, Toronto
- Laid down: 1909
- Launched: 1910
- Completed: 1910
- In service: 1910-1970; 2013-present
- Out of service: 1970-2012
- Identification: Official number: 126835
- Fate: Partially sunk 1970-1991, raised 1992 and restored 2002-2013
- Status: In service as of 2013

General characteristics
- Tonnage: 41.5 GT; 24.64 NT
- Length: 66 ft (20 m)
- Beam: 11 ft 8 in (3.56 m)
- Depth: 6 ft 1 in (1.85 m)
- Decks: 1
- Propulsion: Polson triple expansion steam engine (1910); General Motors 115 bhp (86 kW) diesel engine (1956)
- Capacity: 32

SS Bigwin is a small steamship ferry that plies the waters of Lake of Bays in Muskoka area of Ontario, Canada.

== History ==
The ship was built by Polson Iron Works of Toronto as a private boat for an American owner James Kuhn in 1910 as a yacht and named for his wife as Ella Mary. It was later sold to several owners (1924, 1945 and 1960) to serve as a ferry boat and renamed Bigwin after Bigwin Inn and Chief John Bigwin. In her last years of service, she shuttled customers to Bigwin Inn until it was abandoned and submerged in a slip next to Bigwin Inn from 1970s to 1991.

== Recovery and restoration ==
After interested parties took notice of the ship, it was finally raised from the waters in 1991, and was stored on land for a few years until restoration began in 2002 and completed in 2013.

== As cruise ship ==
Once restored to service, Bigwin provides cruises near Dorset, Ontario during a July and August sailing period (restricted due to navigation laws).

== See also ==
- RMS Segwun, a larger steamship that operates in the Muskoka region.
