= T.J. Clark (fireboat) =

The TJ Clark, formerly a fireboat, after various conversions to carry passengers and freight

T.J. Clark was a fireboat, ferry and cargo vessel, that was operated in the city of Toronto, Ontario, Canada, from 1911 to 1959. She was powered by a pair of steam engines manufactured by Polson Iron Works.

She was not a full-time fireboat. In 1923, when the City of Toronto acquired an official fireboat, the Charles A. Reed, she was shifted to other duties. From 1923 to 1930, she carried freight for residents of the Toronto Islands, first by the Toronto Ferry Company and after 1927 by the Toronto Transportation Commission. In 1930, she was converted to passenger service. She spent her last two years of operation, between 1958 and 1959, carrying freight for the Metro Toronto Department of Parks and Recreation.

She was retired in 1960 and offered for sale. Finally, she was sold for $1 to the Toronto Drydock Company, which completely scrapped the vessel by early 1961.

== See also ==
- Toronto Island ferries
