= HMCS Gulnare =

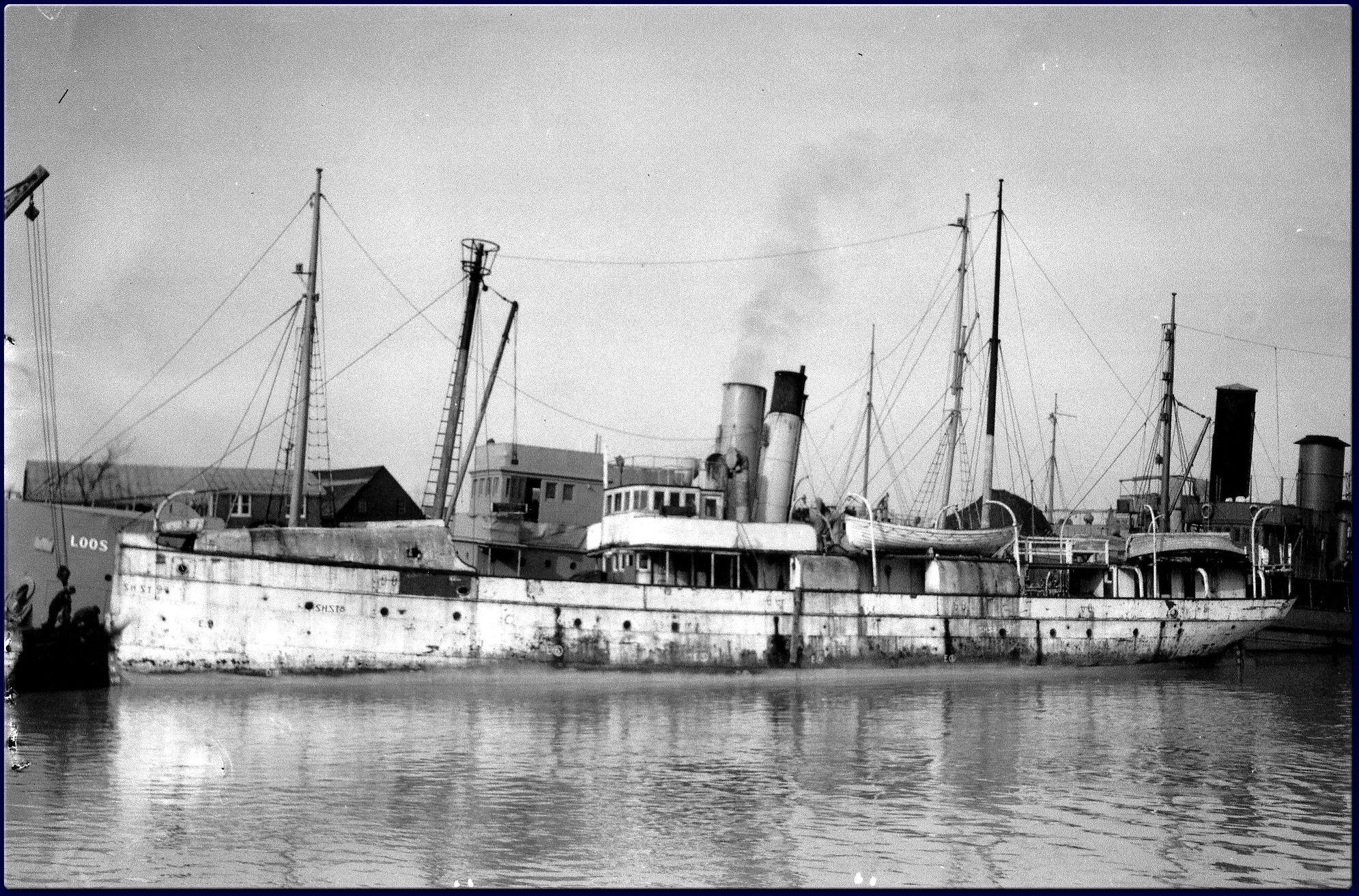
- The former HMCS Gulnare (front) and the former HMCS Loos (rear) on 20 September 1937

History

Canada
- Name: Gulnare
- Builder: Charles Connell and Company, Scotsoun
- Launched: 23 March 1893
- Completed: April 1893
- Acquired: 1902
- In service: 1902
- Out of service: 1914
- In service: 1920
- Out of service: 1946
- Fate: Broken up, 1946 or 1949

Canada
- Name: Gulnare
- Acquired: Transferred to Royal Canadian Navy in 1914
- Commissioned: 1914
- Decommissioned: 1920
- Fate: Returned to government service

General characteristics
- Type: Patrol vessel
- Tonnage: 262 GRT
- Displacement: 500 long tons (510 t)
- Length: 137 ft (41.8 m)
- Beam: 20.5 ft (6.2 m)
- Draught: 14 ft (4.3 m)
- Propulsion: Triple-expansion steam engine, 1 × screw; 64 hp (48 kW) (nominal)
- Speed: 10 knots (19 km/h; 12 mph)
- Complement: 25

HMCS Gulnare was a Canadian government ship that served as a patrol boat and guard vessel for the Royal Canadian Navy (RCN) during the First World War. Acquired by the Canadian government in 1902, Gulnare was used for fisheries patrol and hydrographic survey duties until 1914. Following the war, Gulnare was used to intercept smugglers. Returned to government service in 1920, the vessel was converted to a lightship in 1925 and sold in 1937 to private interests. The vessel was broken up for scrap in the late 1940s.

== Description ==
Gulnare was of steel construction and was 137 feet (41.8 m) long with a beam of 20.5 feet (6.2 m) and a draught of 14 feet (4.3 m). The vessel had a displacement of 500 long tons (510 t) and had a tonnage of 262 gross register tons (GRT). Powered by a triple-expansion steam engine, Gulnare was propelled by one screw creating 64 horsepower (48 kW) (nominal). The ship carried 65 long tons (66 t) of coal for fuel. This gave the ship a maximum speed of 10 knots (19 km/h; 12 mph). Gulnare had a complement of 25.

== Service history ==
=== Origins and early years ===
Gulnare was a steel trawler-type vessel constructed by Charles Connell and Company at their yard in Scotsoun, Scotland. The ship was launched on 23 March 1893 and completed in April 1893. The ship was originally used by the British Admiralty for survey work in Newfoundland waters. Acquired by Canada in 1902 Gulnare was refitted and used for tidal and current survey work on the East Coast and the lower Saint Lawrence River. As one of the ships in the Canadian Hydrographic Survey, she was transferred from the Department of Marine and Fisheries to the Department of Naval Service when the latter was created in 1910. In 1912 she was transferred from survey work to duties as a tender and relief lightship in the lower Saint Lawrence River.

=== First World War ===
Gulnare was placed under naval control in 1914. The RCN initially planned the use the vessel as an auxiliary minesweeper. In 1916 Gulnare was assigned to patrol the coast of Labrador from Belle Isle to Natashkwan. The ship was serving as a guard vessel for Bedford Basin in Halifax, Nova Scotia at the time of the Halifax Explosion on 6 December 1917, but suffered minimal damage. Following the end of the war in 1918, Gulnare was kept in reserve by the RCN.

=== Postwar ===
Gulnare was used for contraband patrols in 1918 and 1919 before being returned to the Department of Marine and Fisheries in 1920 following the postwar reorganization of the government. In 1925 Gulnare was converted to a lightship for use by the Quebec Marine Agency and also found use as a tender by the agency until 1931. In 1934 Gulnare returned to tidal survey work and continued until taken out of service in 1936. Following completion of the tidal survey, the vessel was deemed unsuitable for further work by the agency and in September 1937 Gulnare was sold to Manseau Shipyards of Sorel, Quebec. The following year, the vessel was acquired by Marine Industries of Montreal. Sources disagree on when the vessel was scrapped; Maginley and Collin claim the vessel was broken up in 1946 while the Miramar Ship Index claims the vessel was broken up in 1949.

== Sources ==
- Colledge, J. J.; Warlow, Ben (2006) [1969]. Ships of the Royal Navy: The Complete Record of All Fighting Ships of the Royal Navy from the 15th Century to the Present (3rd Rev ed.). London: Chatham Publishing. ISBN 978-1-86176-281-8. OCLC 67375475.
- "Gulnare (1097071)". Miramar Ship Index.
- Jane's Fighting Ships of World War I. New York: Military Press. 1990 [1919]. ISBN 0-517-03375-5.
- Johnston, William; Rawling, William G.P.; Gimblett, Richard H. & MacFarlane, John (2010). The Seabound Coast: The Official History of the Royal Canadian Navy, 1867–1939. Vol. 1. Toronto: Dundurn Press. ISBN 978-1-55488-908-2.
- Macpherson, Ken & Barrie, Ron (2002). The Ships of Canada's Naval Forces 1910–2002 (Third ed.). St. Catharines, Ontario: Vanwell Publishing. ISBN 1-55125-072-1.
- Maginley, Charles D. & Collin, Bernard (2001). The Ships of Canada's Marine Services. St. Catharines, Ontario: Vanwell Publishing Limited. ISBN 1-55125-070-5.
- Meehan, O.M. (April 2004). "The Hydrographic Survey of Canada from 1928 to the Commencement of the Second World War" (PDF). The Northern Mariner. XIV (2). ISSN 1183-112X.
- Meehan, O.M. (January 2004). "The Hydrographic Survey of Canada from its Formation to the First World War 1904–1914" (PDF). The Northern Mariner. XIV (1). ISSN 1183-112X.
- Meehan, O.M. (January 2004). "The Hydrographic Survey of Canada from the First World War to the Commencement of the Canadian Hydrographic Service, 1915–1927" (PDF). The Northern Mariner. XIV (1). ISSN 1183-112X.
