= CGS Acadia =

Canadian fisheries patrol vessel

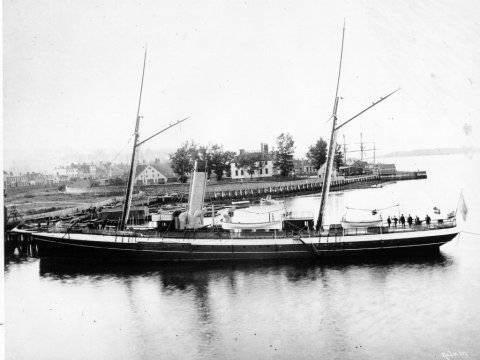
- Acadia alongside

History
- Name: Yosemite
- Owner: William Belden
- Builder: Delaware River Iron Ship Building and Engine Works, Chester, Pennsylvania
- Yard number: 196
- Launched: 9 August 1880
- Completed: December 1880
- Fate: Acquired by Canadian government, 1885

Canada
- Renamed: Acadia
- Namesake: Acadia
- Operator: Department of Marine and Fisheries
- Acquired: 1885
- In service: 1885
- Out of service: 1909
- Stricken: 1910
- Fate: Scrapped 1909

General characteristics
- Type: Patrol vessel
- Tonnage: 520 GRT
- Length: 182.5 ft (55.6 m)
- Beam: 23.5 ft (7.2 m)
- Draught: 19 ft (5.8 m)
- Propulsion: 1 × screw, compound steam engine, 155 hp (116 kW) (nominal)

CGS Acadia (Note: CGS stands for Canadian Government Ship) was a fisheries patrol vessel of the Canadian Department of Marine and Fisheries from 1885 to 1909. The ship began life as the yacht Yosemite, constructed in the United States in 1880. After being acquired in 1885 by Canada and renamed Acadia, the ship served in the Atlantic fisheries, enforcing fisheries regulations in Canadian waters. The ship was taken out of service in 1909 and sold for scrap and Acadia's registry was closed in 1910.

== Description ==
Originally built as a yacht of wood and iron construction, the ship had a tonnage of 520 gross register tons (GRT). The ship was 182.5 feet (55.6 m) long between perpendiculars with a beam of 23.5 feet (7.2 m) and a draught of 19 feet (5.8 m). Acadia was propelled by one screw powered by a compound steam engine rated at 155 hp (116 kW) (nominal).

== Service history ==
The ship was ordered by William Belden from J. Roach & Sons and was constructed at their Delaware River Iron Ship and Engine Works shipyard in Chester, Pennsylvania. The vessel was launched on 9 August 1880 and completed in December of that year. On 14 July 1882, while sailing up the Hudson River, Yosemite was involved in a collision with the yacht Vanderbilt off of Esopus Meadow lighthouse, sinking the vessel. The owner of Vanderbilt brought the affair to court, reaching the United States Supreme Court in 1893, where Belden was found guilty of negligence in operating Yosemite and forced to pay Vanderbilt's owner damages.

In 1885, the vessel was acquired by the Canadian government and converted to a fisheries patrol vessel. (Note: The ship is sometimes referred to as a cruiser.) Originally keeping the name Yosemite, the ship was renamed Acadia in 1891. The ship was used to patrol the fisheries along the East Coast of Canada. The crew were armed with swords and carried small arms for use during ship boardings. Acadia remained in service until 1909, when the ship was sold for scrap. Acadia's registry was closed in 1910.

== See also ==
- HMCS Constance – served alongside Acadia in the Maritimes on non-naval patrols.

== Sources ==
- Maginley, Charles D.; Collin, Bernard (2001). The Ships of Canada's Marine Services. St. Catharines, Ontario: Vanwell Publishing Limited. ISBN 1-55125-070-5.
- "Yosemite (2027616)". Miramar Ship Index.
