= Charles A. Reed (fireboat) =

City of Toronto's first official fireboat

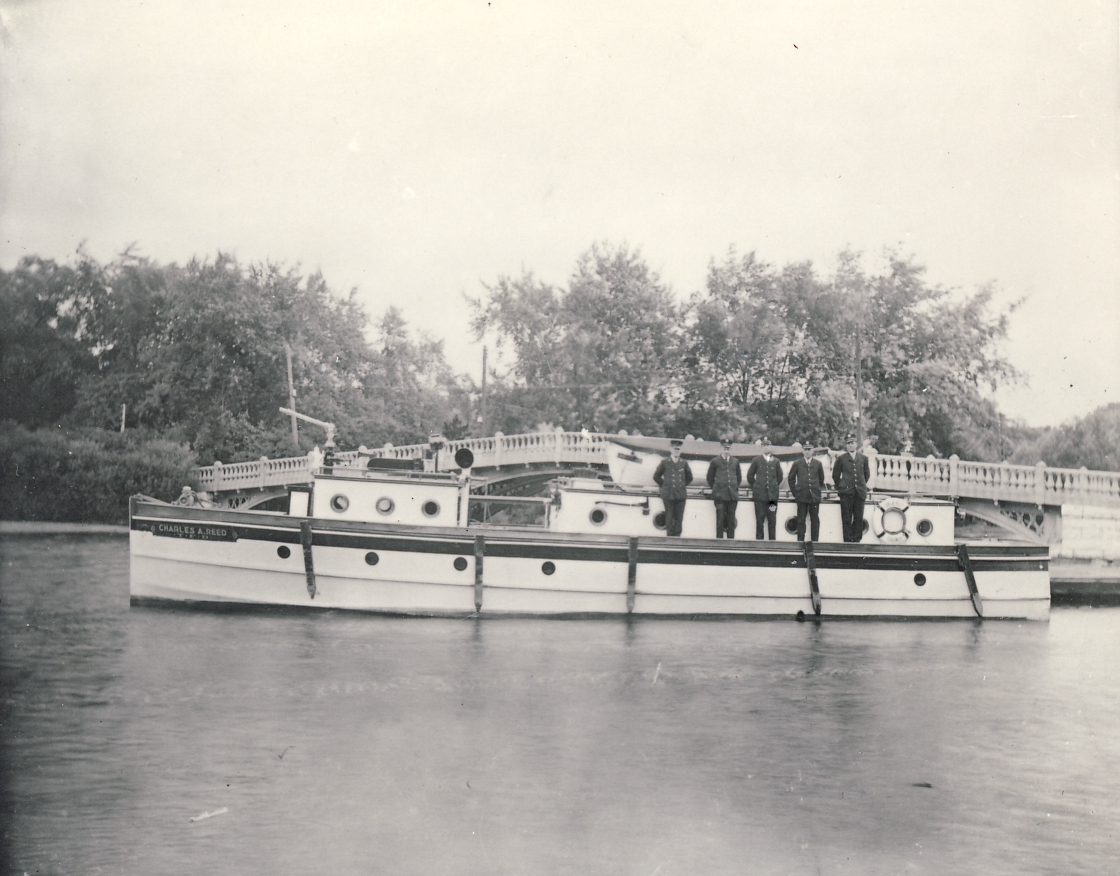
The City of Toronto's first official fireboat, the Charles A. Reed

The Charles A. Reed was the City of Toronto's first official fireboat. She was commissioned in 1923. Previously the privately owned T.J. Clark had provided firefighting capability.

The Charles A. Reed was used well into the 1950s and retired in 1964 and replaced by William Lyon Mackenzie.

The Charles A. Reed was deployed to fight the fire that destroyed the SS Noronic in 1949 at Pier 9. Historian Mike Filey described the vessel's wooden hull being damaged by the heat of the Noronic's blaze. Filey said the vessel was a converted pleasure craft.

Filey wrote that the vessel's namesake, Charles Ardagh Reed, served a single term as Ward 3 (The Ward) Alderman from 1922 to 1923. He wrote that there is no record of the association with the fire department, that triggered him being honoured by having a fireboat named after him.
