= Young Rival =

Canadian indie rock band

- Origin: Hamilton, Ontario, Canada
- Genres: Indie rock, alternative rock, surf rock, neo-psychedelia
- Years active: 2007–2018
- Labels: Sonic Unyon Paper Bag Records
- Members: Aron D'Alesio; John Smith; Noah Fralick
- Past members: Kyle Kuchmey

Young Rival was a Canadian indie rock band from Hamilton, Ontario. It consisted of singer-guitarist Aron D'Alesio, bassist John Smith, and drummer Noah Fralick.

== History ==
In the early 2000s, the group was called The Ride Theory, and released two full-length albums under that name. They changed both the band's name and its musical style in 2007, and it became Young Rival. Guitarist Kyle Kuchmey left the band at the end of 2009.

Young Rival signed to Sonic Unyon. After releasing an EP, the band toured as opening act for The Sadies and for Born Ruffians.

The self-titled debut album was recorded partly in Toronto at HallaMusic Recording Studios and partly in New York City. The band enlisted the talents of American artist James Kuhn to provide face paint art and lip synching talent for the video for the track "Two Reasons" from their October 2012 release, Stay Young.

In 2015, Young Rival released an album of 1960s-style pop music, Interior Light, through Paper Bag Records. This album appeared on the !earshot National Top 50 Chart in December that year. Five additional tracks were released as an EP, Strange Light, in 2016.

== Members ==
- Aron D'Alesio – vocals, guitar
- John Smith – bass
- Noah Fralick – drums

== Discography ==
=== Albums ===
- 2010: Young Rival
- 2012: Stay Young
- 2015: Interior Light
- 2016: Strange Light

=== EPs ===
- 2008: Young Rival EP

=== Singles ===
Year	Song	Chart peak	Album
Year	Song	CAN Alt	Album
2012	"Two Reasons"	39	Stay Young
"—" denotes a release that did not chart.
