= HMCS Loos =

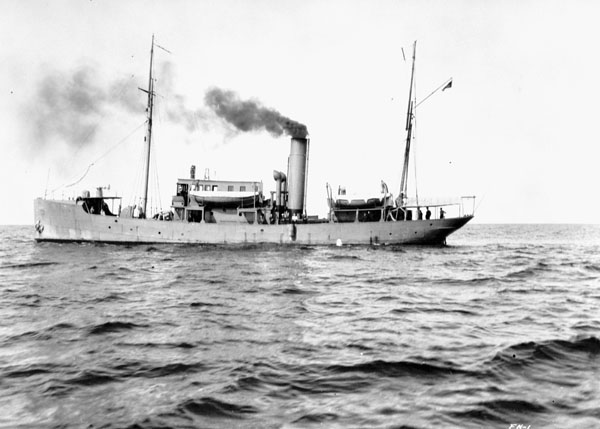
- Sister ship Thiepval in Canadian government service between the wars

History

Canada
- Name: Loos
- Namesake: Battle of Loos
- Ordered: 2 February 1917
- Builder: Kingston Shipbuilding Co., Kingston
- Launched: 27 September 1917
- Commissioned: 1 August 1918
- Decommissioned: 1920
- Recommissioned: 12 December 1940
- Decommissioned: 1945
- Fate: Broken up, 1949

General characteristics
- Class & type: Battle-class naval trawler
- Displacement: 357 long tons (363 t)
- Length: 130 ft (40 m)
- Beam: 25 ft (7.6 m)
- Draught: 13 ft (4.0 m)
- Propulsion: Single screw steam triple expansion, 480 ihp (360 kW)
- Speed: 10 knots (19 km/h; 12 mph)
- Armament: 1 × QF 12-pounder 12 cwt naval gun

HMCS Loos was one of twelve Battle-class naval trawlers used by the Royal Canadian Navy (RCN). Built by the Kingston Shipbuilding Company and launched in September 1917, she was commissioned in August 1918. Decommissioned in 1920, Loos was transferred to the Department of Marine and Fisheries, where she was used as a lighthouse supply ship. Sold in 1937, she was re-acquired by the RCN in December 1940 and converted to a gate vessel, spending part of the war at Shelburne, Nova Scotia. Returned to Marine Industries Limited in 1945, Loos was broken up in 1949.

== Design and description ==
The RCN's Battle-class trawlers formed part of the Canadian naval response to Admiralty warnings to Canada about the growing German U-boat threat to merchant shipping in the western Atlantic. Intended to augment anti-submarine patrols off Canada's east coast, these ships were modelled on contemporary British North Sea trawlers, since the standard types of Canadian fishing vessels were considered unsuitable for patrol work.

Twelve vessels were ordered on 2 February 1917 from two shipyards, Polson Iron Works of Toronto and Canadian Vickers of Montreal. Two of those contracts awarded to Canadian Vickers were subcontracted to Kingston Shipbuilding of Kingston, Ontario. Those vessels retained the same design as those built in Montreal. Those ships constructed using the Canadian Vickers design displaced 357 long tons (363 t) and were 130 feet (40 m) long overall with a beam of 25 feet (7.6 m) and a draught of 13 feet (4.0 m). The vessels were propelled by a steam-powered triple expansion engine driving one shaft creating 480 indicated horsepower (360 kW) giving the vessels a maximum speed of 10 knots (19 km/h; 12 mph).

All twelve trawlers were equipped with a QF 12-pounder 12 cwt naval gun mounted forward. (Note: "Cwt" is the abbreviation for hundredweight, 20 cwt referring to the weight of the gun.) This was considered to be the smallest gun that stood a chance of putting a surfaced U-boat out of action, and they also carried a small number of depth charges. The trawlers were named after battles of the Western Front during the First World War that Canadians had been involved in. They cost between $155,000 and $160,000 per vessel. (Note: Adjusted for inflation to 2026 dollars, $2,859,663 to $2,951,910) (Note: Tucker places the cost at $191,000 (adjusted for inflation to 2026 dollars, $3,523,843))

== Service history ==
Named after the Battle of Loos, the ship was constructed by Kingston Shipbuilding at Kingston, Ontario and launched on 27 September 1917. Intended for use during the 1917 shipping season, the construction of the vessels was delayed by the entry of the United States into the war. With higher wages found south of the border, a shortage of skilled labour developed in the shipyards, coupled with a shortage of construction material. The six vessels ordered from Canadian Vickers were delayed further by difficulty in providing engines for the trawlers. The hulls had been finished during Summer 1917. However, the engines did not arrive until the fall. Loos was commissioned on 1 August 1918.

Loos sailed to the east coast where for the 1918 shipping season, all the Battle-class trawlers were assigned to patrol and escort duties based out of Sydney, Nova Scotia. The trawler performed these duties until the end of the war, and remained in service until 1920, when she was paid off by the RCN. The Department of Marine and Fisheries took over the vessel and converted Loos to a lighthouse supply and buoy vessel in 1922. In the late 1930s, the vessel was sold out of government service to Marine Industries. However, the RCN reacquired the vessel on 12 December 1940. The former trawler was converted to a gate vessel and re-designated Gate Vessel 14 and deployed at Shelburne, Nova Scotia. Following the war, the ship was returned to Marine Industries and broken up in 1949.
