= Polson Iron Works Limited =

Canadian shipyard firm

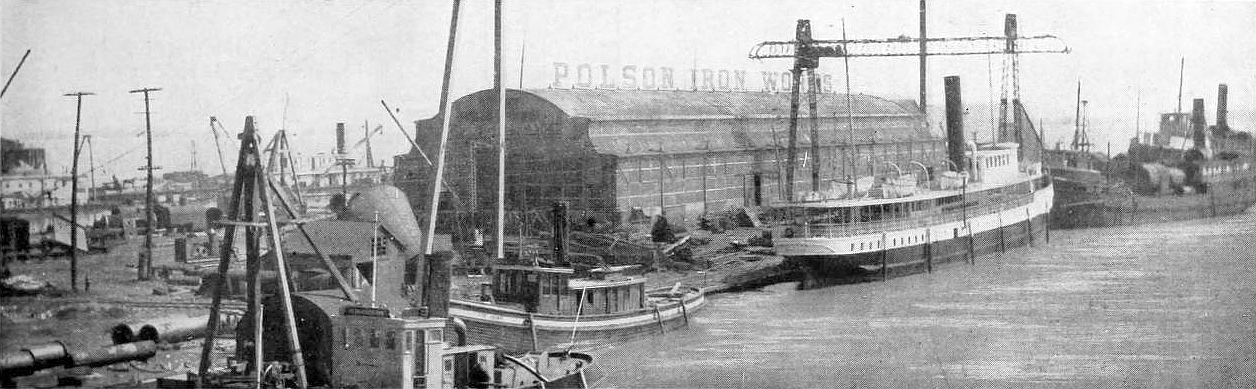
- Polson Iron Works in Toronto, 1916
- Industry: Shipbuilding
- Predecessor: William Polson and Company c. 1883
- Founded: 1886
- Founder: William Polson; Franklin Bates Polson
- Defunct: 1919
- Fate: Ceased operations
- Headquarters: Toronto 1886–1888 and 1893–1919, Owen Sound 1888–1893, Toronto/Owen Sound, Ontario, Canada
- Number of locations: Toronto, Owen Sound
- Area served: Canada
- Key people: William Polson – co-founder, Franklin Bates Polson – co-founder
- Products: Ferries

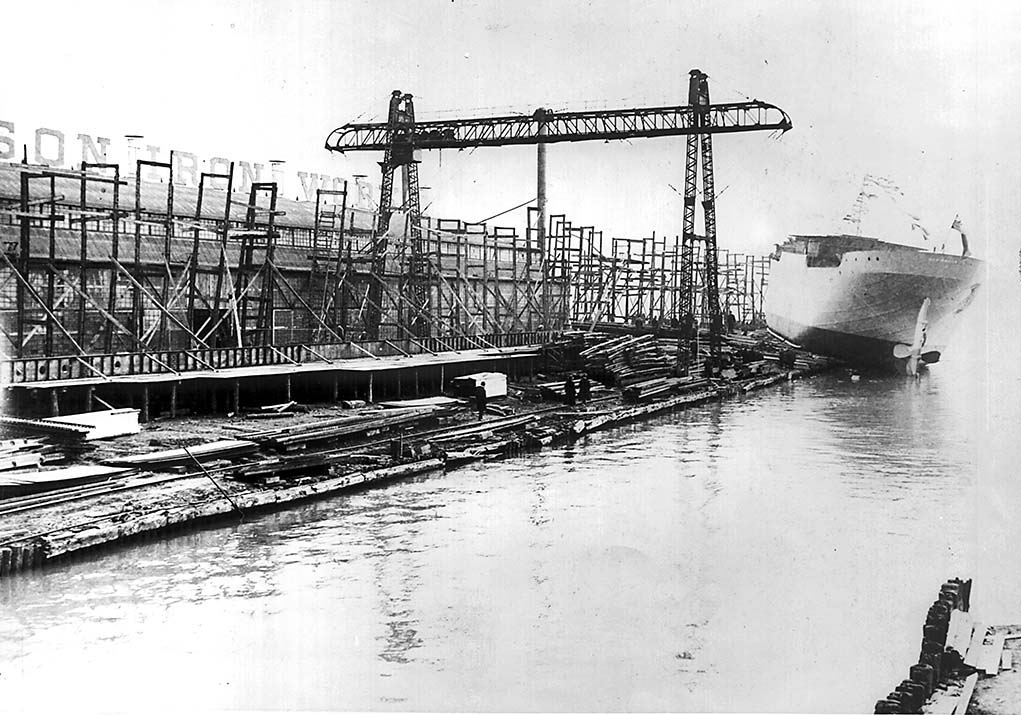
Launching a ship at the Polson Iron Works shipyard.

The Polson Iron Works was an Ontario-based firm which built large steam engines, as well as ships, barges and dredges.

Founded by William Polson (1834–1901) and son Franklin Bates Polson, the firm was incorporated in 1886 and it was one of the original shipyards operating in Toronto.

In 1888 favourable land grants prompted the company to move to Owen Sound, which was then an important port for Canadian Pacific's steamships. Owen Sound facility was at the then existing dry docks on the west side of the harbour near the south end of what is now the West Side Boat Launch on 14th Avenue West.

The firm eventually returned to Toronto in 1897 when Owen Sound's town council did not renew the firm's exemption from property taxes. In Toronto the company's ship yard was located on the harbourfront at the foot of Sherbourne Street (south west at The Esplanade where David Crombie Park and hydro substation now occupies). In 1914 the company agreed to lease land from the Toronto Harbour Commission to build a new facility in the newly reclaimed Portlands industrial district, but the outbreak of World War I prevented the move.

Some of the vessels constructed by the Polson Iron Works remain in service today. They include SS Bigwin, PS Trillium and MV Kwasind.

The engines and hull of Bonnington, a steamboat that ran on the Arrow Lakes from 1911 to 1931, were built at the Polson Iron Works, and shipped by rail to British Columbia.

The company ceased operations around 1919, but the name lives on in Polson Pier, where the company had intended to relocate the shipyard.

== Ships built ==
Polson was a builder of motor yachts for the wealthy in Toronto during the late 19th and early 20th centuries. Ships built before 1888 and after 1897 would have been built in Toronto with the rest at their Owen Sound shipyard.

List of ships built:

=== Motor yachts ===
- Mockingbird (1886)
- Vivid (1886)
- Rescue (1886)
- Electric (1887)
- Gypsy (1887)
- Siesta (1889)
- Undine (1889)
- Naiad (1890)
- Siesta (1892)
- Undine (1892)
- Mizpah (1892)
- Annie C. Hill (1898)
- Wanda (1898)
- Bobs (1900)
- Llaus (1900)
- Islander (1900)
- Llano (1900)
- Ina (1901)
- Kate (1902)
- Espanola (1902)
- Linnea (1903)
- Mildred (1903)
- Rambler (1903)
- Temagami (1905)
- Wanda II (1905)
- Wawinet (1904)
- Keego (1909)
- Sir Wilfrid (1902)
- Morning Star (1907)
- Roberval (1907)
- Bessie Butler (1907)
- P.W.D. No. 117 (1909)
- Kwasind (1912)
- Wanda III (1915)

=== Tugs ===
- Conqueror (1886)
- Pikouagami (1906)
- Loretta (1908)
- G.R. Geary (1912)
- Batchawanna (1912)

=== Ferries ===
- City of Chatham (1888)
- Mizpah (1889)
- Majestic (1899)
- Algoma (1901)
- Charles Lyon (1908)
- Kuskanook

=== Passenger vessels ===
- Manitoba (1889)

=== Train ferries ===
- Ontario (1890, for CPR)
- Ontario #2 (1915)

=== Patrol boats ===
- Constance (1891)
- Curlew (1892)
- Petrel (1892)
- Vigilant (1903)

=== Others ===
- Knapp roller boat (1897)
- Barge Inenew (1902)
- Lightship Lurcher (1903)
- Lightship Anticosti (1904)
- Hercules (1906)
- Barge Navarch (1906)
- Keego (1909)
- Clinker Shuniah (1910)
- Fireboat T.J. Clark (1911)
- Drill Scow MNCO No 6 (1912)
- Clinker Port Nelson (1913)
- Dredge City Dredge No 2 (1914)
- Cyclone (1914)
- Buoy tender Grenville (1914)
- Terminals Lighter Hudson Bay No. 1 (1914)
- Terminals Lighter Hudson Bay No. 2 (1914)
- Terminals Lighter Hudson Bay No. 3 (1914)
- Q.H.C. No 51 (1914)
- Q.H.C. No 52 (1914)
- Q.H.C. No 53 (1914)
- Q.H.C. No 54 (1914)
- Q.H.C. No 55 (1914)
- Seventy Five (1915)
- Tornado (1915)

=== Naval vessels ===
- HMCS Messines (1917) minesweeper
- HMCS St. Eloi (1917) minesweeper
- HMCS St. Julien (1917) minesweeper
- HMCS Vimy (1917) minesweeper
- HMCS Ypres (1917) minesweeper
- HMCS Festubert (1917) minesweeper

=== Cargo vessels ===
- Tento (1918)
- Asp (1918)
- War Hydra (1919)
- War Taurus (1919)
- War Tamiskaming (1919)
- Aquila / War Hamilton (1919)
- War Algoma (1919)
- War Halton (1919)

=== Aircraft ===
In 1916 Polson Iron Works was involved in the production of the M.F.P Tractor Biplane for MFP Company owned by J.B. Miller, Walter L. Fairchild and Walter H. Phipps. The plane was designed by Walter H. Phipps, owner of Steel Constructed Aeroplanes Co of New York. Fairchild was a monoplane pioneer from Hempstead Plains, New York.
