= James Kuhn =

James Lawrence Kuhn (born November 19, 1961) is an American visual artist and professional clown ("Haw Haw the Clown") from Three Oaks, Michigan. Kuhn is known for his "365 Faces in a Year", in which he painted a different image on his face and head every day for a year. Kuhn has lent his artistic talents to the Canadian indie rock band Young Rival's video "Two Reasons".
