= HMCS Florence =

Royal Canadian Navy patrol vessel

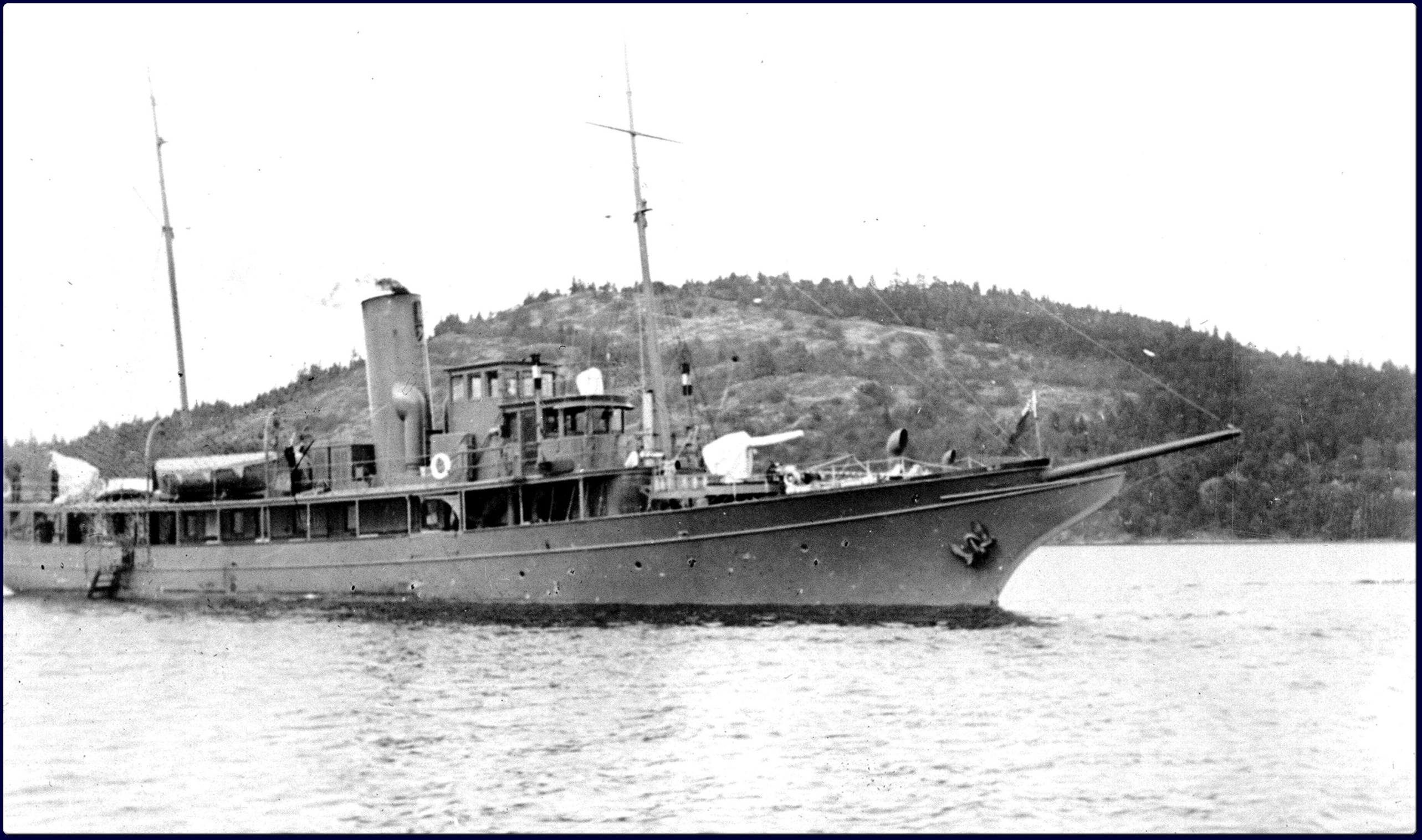
- HMCS Florence in Canadian service

History
- Name: Czarina
- Builder: Crescent Shipyard, Elizabeth, New Jersey
- Launched: 1903
- Renamed: Emeline; Florence (1910)
- Fate: Transferred to Royal Canadian Navy

Canada
- Name: Florence
- Acquired: 1915
- Commissioned: 19 July 1915
- Decommissioned: 21 September 1916
- Fate: Sold to private interests and lost in Caribbean, January 1917

General characteristics
- Type: Armed yacht
- Tonnage: 257 GRT
- Length: 166 ft (51 m) oa; 144 ft (44 m) pp
- Beam: 22.5 ft (6.9 m)
- Draught: 7.5 ft (2.3 m)
- Speed: 12 knots (22 km/h; 14 mph)
- Armament: 1 × QF 3-pounder Hotchkiss gun

HMCS Florence was a commissioned patrol vessel of the Royal Canadian Navy that served in the First World War. Originally launched as the yacht Czarina, she was acquired by John Craig Eaton in 1910 and renamed Florence. Following the outbreak of war, Eaton donated the yacht to the Royal Canadian Navy. The ship had a short career and proved unsuitable for navy work and was paid off in September 1916. The vessel was subsequently sold to buyers in Martinique, and was reportedly lost in the Caribbean Sea in January 1917.

== Description ==
The vessel was 166 ft (51 m) long overall and 144 ft (44 m) between perpendiculars with a beam of 22.5 ft (6.9 m) and a draught of 7.5 ft (2.3 m). The vessel had a gross register tonnage (GRT) of 237 when built and 257 during service with the Royal Canadian Navy. The yacht, of steel construction, had a maximum speed of 13 knots (24 km/h; 15 mph) when constructed with reported speeds of up to 17 knots (31 km/h; 20 mph). However, by the time Florence reached Royal Canadian Navy service, the vessel's maximum speed was just 12 knots (22 km/h; 14 mph). During naval service, the ship was armed with one forward-mounted QF 3-pounder Hotchkiss gun.

== Construction and career ==
One of the many yachts built for tycoons in the eastern United States, the steam yachts were used for commuting on rivers in cities such as New York City or Washington, D.C. They were usually comfortable but fast and were intended to be used for commuting from work to luxurious homes on Long Island or along Chesapeake Bay. The yacht was constructed by Crescent Shipyard in Elizabeth, New Jersey, with the yard number 105 and launched in 1903 as Czarina. The vessel was built for Charles S. Bryan. The vessel was renamed Emeline before being sold to John Eaton in 1908, who again renamed the yacht to Florence, after his wife in 1910. Florence was then brought to Toronto, Ontario.

During the First World War the Royal Canadian Navy was tasked with creating a patrol force for the Gulf of St. Lawrence and the Atlantic Coast of Canada. In August 1914, Eaton offered Florence for use by the Royal Canadian Navy but was turned down. Eaton then had Florence laid up while he focused on other war efforts. In June 1915, the Royal Canadian Navy searched for vessels capable of performing patrol duties and Eaton donated Florence to the navy for $1 on 8 July 1915. The vessel was handed over to the navy in Montreal, Quebec and underwent conversion at Canadian Vickers to a warship, having her hull strengthened and receiving her armament. The Royal Canadian Navy commissioned the vessel on 19 July 1915. While in transit to the Atlantic Coast, Florence collided with the merchant vessel SS The Iroquois on 22 July, suffering some damage. Initially assigned to patrols of the Bay of Fundy, Florence also patrolled from the north shore of Quebec along the Saint Lawrence River to the west coast of Newfoundland and into the Gulf of St. Lawrence. The ship was based out of Sydney, Nova Scotia. However, Florence was considered unseaworthy in heavy weather and was used as a guard ship at Saint John, New Brunswick. During the winter months, Florence was laid up and underwent a refit starting 22 December to fix issues that arose during patrols. However, as spring approached, it was decided to not bring the ship back into service and plans were drawn up to return the vessel to Eaton. This was rejected and instead the Royal Canadian Navy chose to sell the vessel instead. For the next five months, the vessel remained laid up at Saint John. Florence was paid off on 21 September 1916 and sold to a trading company in Martinique. In January 1917, the yacht was lost in the Caribbean Sea.
