= Battle of Messines =

Battle of Messines may refer to:

- Battle of Messines (1914)
- Battle of Messines (1917)
- Battle of Messines (1918)
