= HMCS Newington =

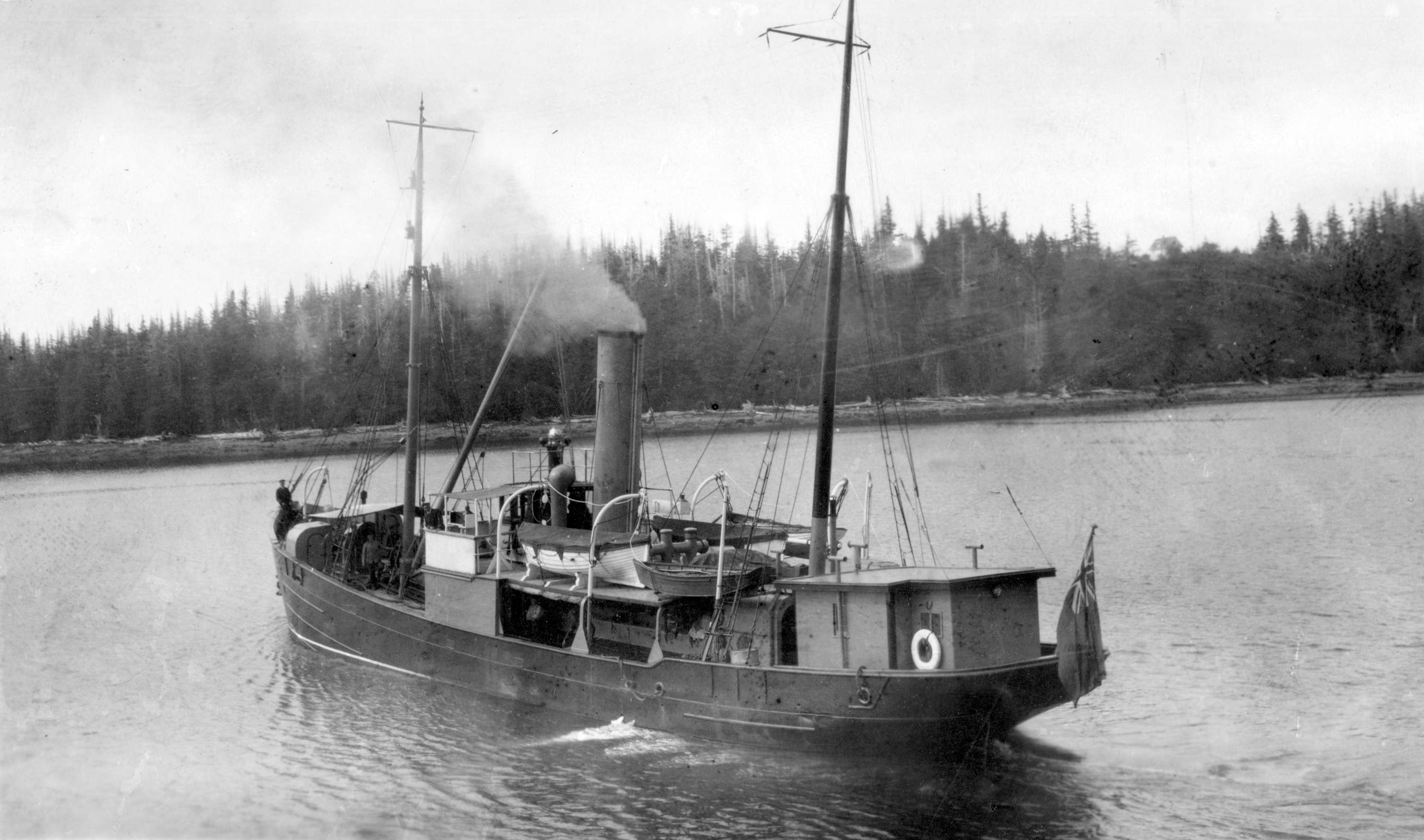
- Newington while in government service

History

Canada
- Name: Newington
- Builder: Cook, Welton & Gemmell, Hull, England
- Launched: 2 March 1899
- Completed: 1 April 1899
- Acquired: 1908
- Commissioned: 1914
- Decommissioned: 1918
- Fate: Sank 26 August 1959

General characteristics
- Type: Patrol vessel
- Tonnage: 193 GRT
- Length: 115 ft (35.1 m)
- Beam: 21 ft (6.4 m)
- Draught: 11.5 ft (3.5 m)
- Propulsion: 1 × screw; Steam triple expansion engine, 58 hp (43 kW) (nominal)
- Speed: 10.5 knots (19.4 km/h; 12.1 mph)

HMCS Newington was a commissioned patrol vessel of the Royal Canadian Navy that served in the First World War. Prior to the war, the ship served as a fishing trawler and lighthouse tender for the Canadian government. Following the war the vessel was returned to government service. Newington was converted to a tugboat in 1920. Sold to private interests in 1920 the ship sank on 26 August 1959 while laid up in Burrard Inlet, British Columbia.

== Description ==
Newington had a tonnage of 193 gross register tons (GRT) and was 115 feet (35.1 m) long with a beam of 21 feet (6.4 m) and a draught of 11.5 feet (3.5 m). The ship was powered by a steam triple expansion engine, driving one screw creating 58 hp (43 kW) (nominal). This gave the ship a maximum speed of 10.5 knots (19.4 km/h; 12.1 mph). The vessel could carry 85 long tons (86 t) of coal for fuel.

== Service history ==
The ship was built as an iron-hulled fishing trawler by Cook, Welton & Gemmell at Hull for City Steam Fishing Co Ltd. Newington was launched on 2 March 1899 and completed on 1 April of that year. Newington was purchased by the Canadian government in 1908 and converted to a lighthouse supply ship and buoy tender for use in British Columbia waters.

Following the declaration of war by Canada the First World War in August 1914, Newington was taken over by the Royal Canadian Navy and fitted to lay naval mines. Newington was kept on standby to lay minefields across the entrance to Johnstone Strait until December of that year when the German threat in the Pacific Ocean was nullified. Newington had the minelaying equipment removed and was used as a patrol vessel along the West Coast of Canada for the rest of the war. The ship returned to civilian service in 1920, sold to the Pacific Coyle Navigation Company. The vessel was converted to a tugboat and in 1956, was sold to Straits Towing Ltd. On 26 August 1959 she sank in Burrard Inlet, British Columbia. (Note: The Miramar Ship Index states the vessel having sunk on 22 August 1959.)
