= HMCS Constance =

Canadian patrol vessel

- Constance, possibly while in service as CGS Constance prior to the First World War.

History

Canada
- Name: Constance
- Builder: Polson Iron Works, Owen Sound
- Launched: 1891
- Commissioned: 1914, as HMCS Constance
- Decommissioned: 1919
- Fate: Sold in 1924

General characteristics
- Type: Patrol vessel
- Displacement: 185 long tons (188 t)
- Length: 115 ft 0 in (35.1 m)
- Beam: 19 ft 6 in (5.9 m)
- Draught: 11 ft 2 in (3.4 m)
- Propulsion: 1 × screw, compound steam engine, 50 nhp
- Speed: 10 knots (19 km/h)
- Complement: 23
- Armament: 3 × machine guns

HMCS Constance was a commissioned minesweeper of the Royal Canadian Navy (RCN) during the First World War. Originally built as a fisheries cruiser for the Department of Marine and Fisheries, upon completion she was transferred to the Department of Customs, and was used by the Customs Preventive Service. Constance spent the entire war as a patrol and examination vessel on the East Coast of Canada. Following the war, the vessel was sold in 1924.

== Description ==
Constance had a gross register tonnage of 185 tons, which did not increase during the First World War when it became her official displacement. The vessel was fitted with a ram bow, giving the ship the appearance of a gunboat. The ship was 115 feet 0 inches (35.1 m) long with a beam of 19 feet 6 inches (5.9 m) and a draught of 11 feet 2 inches (3.4 m). The ship was powered by a compound steam engine using coal driving one screw creating 50 nominal horsepower. This gave Constance a maximum speed of 10 knots (19 km/h). (Note: Maginley and Collin state the speed of the vessel was 11 knots (20 km/h).) The vessel was armed with three machine guns and had a complement of 23.

== Service history ==
Constance was ordered from Polson Iron Works by Charles Tupper, Minister of Marine and Fisheries and constructed at their yard in Owen Sound, Ontario. The ship was ordered after a fishing treaty collapsed with the United States and the Royal Navy refused to send vessels to monitor the Atlantic Canada fisheries. The vessel was launched in 1891. The ship was initially intended to be a fisheries patrol vessel but was turned over to Customs Preventative Service shortly after launch. Constance had two sisters, Curlew and Petrel. Constance was paid for in part when the department sold the small patrol vessel Cruiser to Polson Iron Works. There was some concern in the United States over the construction of these vessels on the Great Lakes, claiming that it might be in contravention of the Rush–Bagot Treaty. Constance was initially assigned to patrol the Saint Lawrence River and upper Gulf of St. Lawrence. Constance's role was to intercept suspicious vessels in Canadian waters and investigating them for illicit cargo and goods. If found, Constance would then escort the vessel to a Canadian port. Proceeds from any interception were distributed among the crew. Although at work for the Customs Preventative Service of Canada, the ship was nominally owned by the Department of Marine and Fisheries.

In August 1908, Constance became a fisheries patrol vessel on the East Coast of Canada. In 1912, Constance and her sisters were all outfitted for minesweeping. With the outbreak of the First World War in 1914, Constance was commissioned into the Royal Canadian Navy and from the beginning to the end of the war in 1918, was used for patrol and examination services on the East Coast. Following the war, Constance was paid off in 1919 and put up for sale. The vessel was sold in 1924. In 1926, Constance was chartered once again by Customs Preventative Service for duties at Cape Breton as part of the force's expansion to combat rum smuggling in Nova Scotia during American Prohibition. In 1929, the Customs Preventative Service ended the charter for Constance.

== See also ==
- CGS Acadia – served alongside Constance in the Maritimes on non-naval patrols.

== Sources ==
- Johnston, William; Rawling, William G.P.; Gimblett, Richard H. & MacFarlane, John (2010). The Seabound Coast: The Official History of the Royal Canadian Navy, 1867–1939. Vol. 1. Toronto: Dundurn Press. ISBN 978-1-55488-908-2.
- Macpherson, Ken & Barrie, Ron (2002). The Ships of Canada's Naval Forces 1910–2002 (Third ed.). St. Catharines, Ontario: Vanwell Publishing. ISBN 1-55125-072-1.
- Maginley, Charles D. & Collin, Bernard (2001). The Ships of Canada's Marine Services. St. Catharines, Ontario: Vanwell Publishing Limited. ISBN 1-55125-070-5.
- McDougall, David J. (October 1995). "The Origins and Growth of the Canadian Customs Preventive Service Fleet in the Maritime Provinces and Eastern Quebec, 1892–1932". The Northern Mariner. V (4). ISSN 1183-112X.
