= HMCS Vimy =

Battle class navy trawler

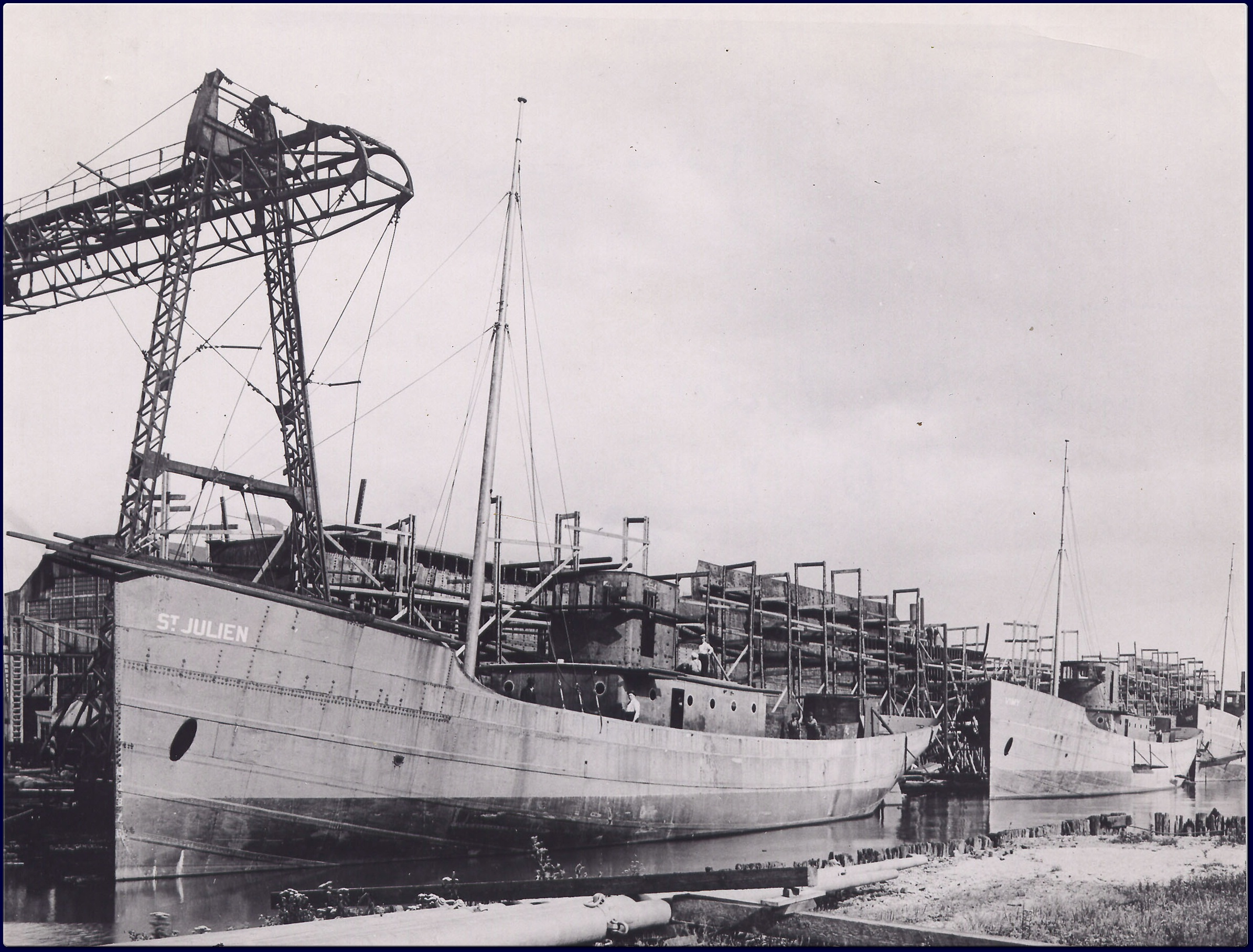
- Vimy (right) and St Julien (left) under construction in Toronto, 1917

History

Canada
- Name: Vimy
- Namesake: Battle of Vimy Ridge
- Ordered: 2 February 1917
- Builder: Polson Iron Works Limited, Toronto
- Launched: 17 July 1917
- Commissioned: 13 November 1917
- Decommissioned: 30 November 1918
- Renamed: Re-designated Lightship No. 5
- Fate: Possibly broken up around 1958

General characteristics
- Class & type: Battle-class naval trawler
- Displacement: 320 long tons (330 t)
- Length: 130 ft (40 m)
- Beam: 23 ft 5 in (7.14 m)
- Draught: 13 ft 5 in (4.09 m)
- Propulsion: 1 x triple expansion, 480 ihp (360 kW)
- Speed: 10 knots (12 mph; 19 km/h)
- Armament: 1 × QF 12-pounder 12 cwt naval gun

HMCS Vimy was one of twelve Battle-class naval trawlers constructed for and used by the Royal Canadian Navy (RCN) during the First World War. Following the war the ship was transferred to the Canadian Department of Marine and Fisheries and converted into a lightvessel. Re-designated Lightship No. 5, the vessel remained in Canadian government service until being possibly broken up for scrap in 1958.

== Design and description ==
The RCN's Battle-class trawlers formed part of the Canadian naval response to Admiralty warnings to Canada about the growing German U-boat threat to merchant shipping in the western Atlantic. Intended to augment anti-submarine patrols off Canada's east coast, these ships were modelled on contemporary British North Sea trawlers, since the standard types of Canadian fishing vessels were considered unsuitable for patrol work.

Twelve vessels were ordered on 2 February 1917 from two shipyards, Polson Iron Works of Toronto and Canadian Vickers of Montreal. Those vessels built at Polson Iron Works displaced 320 long tons (330 t) and were 130 feet (40 m) long overall with a beam of 23 feet 5 inches (7.14 m) and a draught of 13 feet 5 inches (4.09 m). They were propelled by a steam-powered triple expansion engine driving one shaft creating 480 indicated horsepower (360 kW) giving the vessels a maximum speed of 10 knots (19 km/h; 12 mph).

All twelve trawlers were equipped with a QF 12-pounder 12 cwt naval gun mounted forward. (Note: "Cwt" is the abbreviation for hundredweight, 20 cwt referring to the weight of the gun.) This was considered to be the smallest gun that stood a chance of putting a surfaced U-boat out of action, and they also carried a small number of depth charges. The trawlers were named after battles of the Western Front during the First World War that Canadians had been involved in. They cost between $155,000 and $160,000 per vessel. (Note: Adjusted for inflation to 2026 dollars, $2,859,663 to $2,951,910) (Note: Tucker places the cost at $191,000 (adjusted for inflation to 2026 dollars, $3,523,843))

== Service history ==
Named after the Battle of Vimy Ridge, the trawler was built by Polson Iron Works at Toronto, Ontario, and was launched on 16 June 1917. Intended for use during the 1917 shipping season, the construction of the vessels was delayed by the entry of the United States into the war. With higher wages found south of the border, a shortage of skilled labour developed in the shipyards, coupled with a shortage of construction material. Vimy was commissioned on 13 November 1917. Vimy sailed to the east coast where for the 1918 shipping season, all the Battle-class trawlers were assigned to patrol and escort duties based out of Sydney, Nova Scotia. The Battle class was used for patrol and escort duties off the Atlantic coast of Canada until the end of the war.

The trawler was paid off on 30 November 1918. The ship was transferred to the Department of Marine and Fisheries in 1922 and converted into a lightship, like sister ships Messines, St. Eloi, and St. Julien. This involved placing an electric light at the foremast head and installing a foghorn atop a latticework tower. The ship was re-designated Lightship No. 5 and the vessel was possibly broken up for scrap in 1958.
