= CGS Petrel =

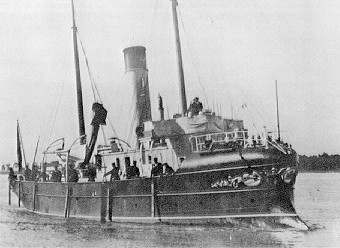
- Petrel underway

History

Canada
- Name: Petrel
- Builder: Polson Iron Works Limited, Owen Sound
- Completed: 1892
- Fate: Sold

General characteristics
- Type: Patrol vessel
- Tonnage: 192 GRT
- Length: 116 ft (35.4 m)
- Beam: 22 ft (6.7 m)
- Draught: 11 ft (3.4 m)
- Propulsion: Compound steam engine; 50 hp (37 kW) (nominal); 1 × screw
- Speed: 11 knots (20 km/h)
- Armament: 1 × QF 12-pounder 12 cwt naval gun; 3 × machine guns

CGS Petrel (Note: CGS stands for Canadian Government Ship) was a Canadian patrol vessel used primarily for fisheries protection on the upper Great Lakes from 1892 to 1904. In 1904, Petrel was sent to the East Coast of Canada for fisheries protection duties there. In 1912, Petrel was fitted for minesweeping and in 1914, was taken over by the Royal Canadian Navy for use as an examination vessel during the First World War. Following the war, Petrel was discarded.

== Description ==
Petrel was the third vessel in her class, her sister ships being Curlew and Constance. Petrel was slightly larger than her sister ships, being 116 feet (35.4 m) long with a beam 22 feet (6.7 m) and a draught of 11 feet (3.4 m). The vessel had a tonnage of 192 gross register tons (GRT). The vessel was powered by a compound steam engine driving one screw creating 50 horsepower (37 kW) (nominal). This gave the vessel a maximum speed of 11 knots (20 km/h). The ship was armed with one QF 12-pounder 12 cwt naval gun and three machine guns. (Note: "Cwt" is the abbreviation for hundredweight, 20 cwt referring to the weight of the gun.)

== Service history ==
In 1888, a treaty to combat illegal fishing in Canadian waters between Canada and the United States was rejected by the United States Senate. Prime Minister Sir Charles Tupper then sought British Royal Navy aid in patrolling Canadian fisheries, but his request was rejected. The Canadian government then ordered the construction of three new armed patrol vessels. Petrel was constructed by Polson Iron Works Limited at their shipyard in Owen Sound, Ontario. The vessel entered service in 1892 patrolling the Great Lakes. Petrel was given directives to target illegal fishing by Americans in Canadian waters.

On 8 May 1894, the Canadian vessel intercepted a large group of American fishing vessels, arresting 50 fisherman and impounding their boats. In 1902, Petrel seized 998 nets from poachers. However, the ship was being outpaced by the American fishing vessels that it sought to catch. That year, a newer, faster vessel was requested. On 12 August 1903, Petrel fired upon an American fishing vessel, Silver Spray, that appeared to be fishing in Canadian waters, off Long Point, in Lake Erie. Silver Spray returned to Erie, Pennsylvania having been hit twenty times, but had escaped from the Canadian vessel.

Petrel remained on the Great Lakes until 1904, when the ship proved to be too slow to catch up with American fishing vessels. Replaced by CGS Vigilant, Petrel was then sent to the East Coast of Canada where fishing schooners were still being used. The ship remained in this service until 1912, when Petrel was fitted for minesweeping. At the onset of the First World War, Petrel was among the vessels forced into patrol duty by the Royal Canadian Navy and was used to patrol the Grand Manan Channel. Following the arrival of the submarines CC-1 and CC-2 on the East Coast in 1916, Petrel was used to train hydrophone operators on Bras D'Or Lake. After the war's end in 1918, Petrel was discarded.

== Sources ==
- Appleton, Thomas E. (1969). Usque Ad Mare: A History of the Canada Coast Guard and Marine Services. Ottawa: Department of Transport. OCLC 2230587.
- Bogue, Margaret Beattie (2000). Fishing the Great Lakes: An Environmental History, 1783–1933. Madison, Wisconsin: University of Wisconsin Press. ISBN 0-299-16764-X.
- Johnston, William; Rawling, William G.P.; Gimblett, Richard H. & MacFarlane, John (2010). The Seabound Coast: The Official History of the Royal Canadian Navy, 1867–1939. Vol. 1. Toronto: Dundurn Press. ISBN 978-1-55488-908-2.
- Maginley, Charles D. & Collin, Bernard (2001). The Ships of Canada's Marine Services. St. Catharines, Ontario: Vanwell Publishing Limited. ISBN 1-55125-070-5.
