= HMCS Curlew =

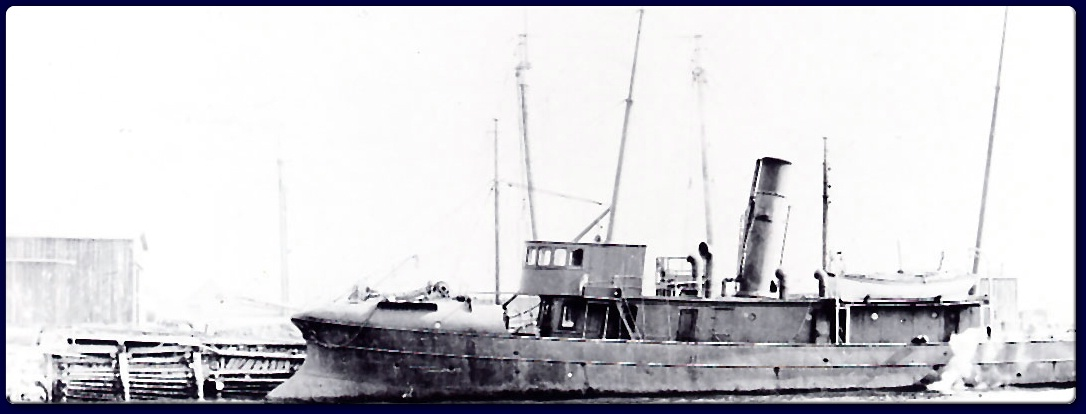
- HMCS Curlew alongside

History

Canada
- Name: Curlew
- Namesake: The curlew
- Builder: Polson Iron Works, Owen Sound
- Launched: 1892
- Commissioned: 1914, as HMCS Curlew
- Fate: Sold, 1921

General characteristics
- Type: Patrol vessel
- Displacement: 185 long tons (188 t)
- Length: 116 ft 3 in (35.4 m)
- Beam: 19 ft 8 in (6.0 m)
- Draught: 11 ft 3 in (3.4 m)
- Propulsion: Compound steam engine, 1 × screw, 50 nhp
- Speed: 10 knots (19 km/h)
- Complement: 23
- Armament: 3 × machine guns

HMCS Curlew was a commissioned minesweeper and patrol vessel of the Royal Canadian Navy (RCN) that served in the First World War. Constructed in Ontario in 1892, Curlew was initially a Canadian government fisheries patrol vessel on the East Coast of Canada. In 1912, the ship was fitted as a minesweeper and in 1914, joined the RCN. Curlew spent the entire war on the East Coast of Canada. Following the war, the ship was taken out of service and sold in 1921.

== Description ==
Curlew had a gross register tonnage of 185 tons, which did not increase during the First World War when it became her official displacement. The vessel was fitted with a ram bow, giving the ship the appearance of a gunboat. The ship was 116 feet 3 inches (35.4 m) long with a beam of 19 feet 8 inches (6.0 m) and a draught of 11 feet 3 inches (3.4 m). The ship was powered by a compound steam engine driving one screw creating 50 nominal horsepower. This gave Curlew a maximum speed of 10 knots (19 km/h). (Note: Maginley and Collin state the speed of the vessel was 11 knots (20 km/h).) The vessel was armed with three machine guns and had a complement of 23.

== Construction and career ==
Curlew was ordered from Polson Iron Works by Charles Tupper, Minister of Marine and Fisheries and constructed at their yard in Owen Sound, Ontario. The ship, along with her two sisters, Constance and Petrel, were ordered after a fishing treaty collapsed between Canada and the United States and the Royal Navy refused to send vessels to monitor the Atlantic Canada fisheries. Curlew was launched in 1892 and deployed to the East Coast of Canada as a Department of Marine and Fisheries fisheries patrol vessel. Curlew remained in this duty until 1912 when the ship was fitted for minesweeping. In 1914, the ship was commissioned by the RCN with the outbreak of the First World War and was used as a patrol and minesweeping craft on the East Coast until the war's end in 1918. Following the war, Curlew was paid off by the RCN and put up for sale, being sold in 1921.

== Sources ==
- Johnston, William; Rawling, William G.P.; Gimblett, Richard H. & MacFarlane, John (2010). The Seabound Coast: The Official History of the Royal Canadian Navy, 1867–1939. Vol. 1. Toronto: Dundurn Press. ISBN 978-1-55488-908-2.
- Macpherson, Ken & Barrie, Ron (2002). The Ships of Canada's Naval Forces 1910–2002 (Third ed.). St. Catharines, Ontario: Vanwell Publishing. ISBN 1-55125-072-1.
- Maginley, Charles D. & Collin, Bernard (2001). The Ships of Canada's Marine Services. St. Catharines, Ontario: Vanwell Publishing Limited. ISBN 1-55125-070-5.
