= HMCS Restless =

Canadian Navy patrol vessel in World War I

History

Canada
- Name: Restless
- Owner: Royal Canadian Navy
- Builder: New Westminster
- Launched: 1906
- Commissioned: 1914
- Decommissioned: 1920
- Fate: Sold, 1927

History

Canada
- Acquired: 1927
- Fate: Destroyed by fire, 1950

General characteristics
- Class & type: Patrol vessel
- Displacement: 76 tons
- Length: 71 ft (22 m)
- Beam: 17 ft (5.2 m)
- Draught: 7 ft (2.1 m)

HMCS Restless was a commissioned patrol vessel of the Royal Canadian Navy that served during the First World War. Built at New Westminster, British Columbia, she was purchased for fisheries patrol in 1908 and requisitioned for naval use in 1914. Following the war she served as a training ship at the Royal Naval College of Canada, Esquimalt, British Columbia before being sold for commercial use.

== Service history ==
Built at New Westminster, British Columbia in 1906, the ship was purchased for fisheries patrol in 1908. In 1914 Restless was requisitioned by the Royal Canadian Navy to become an examination vessel on the west coast, a role the vessel performed throughout the First World War. Following the war the ship was used as a training ship for the Royal Naval College at Esquimalt from 1918 to 1920 for the sea cadets.

In 1927 Restless was sold for commercial use and was still in service until 1950 when the ship was destroyed by fire in Saanichton Bay, British Columbia.

== Sources ==
- Converted civilian vessels
- Macpherson, Ken; Barrie, Ron (2002). Warships of Canada's Naval Forces 1910–2002 (3 ed.). St. Catharines: Vanwell Publishing Ltd. ISBN 1-55125-072-1.
