= HMCS St. Eloi =

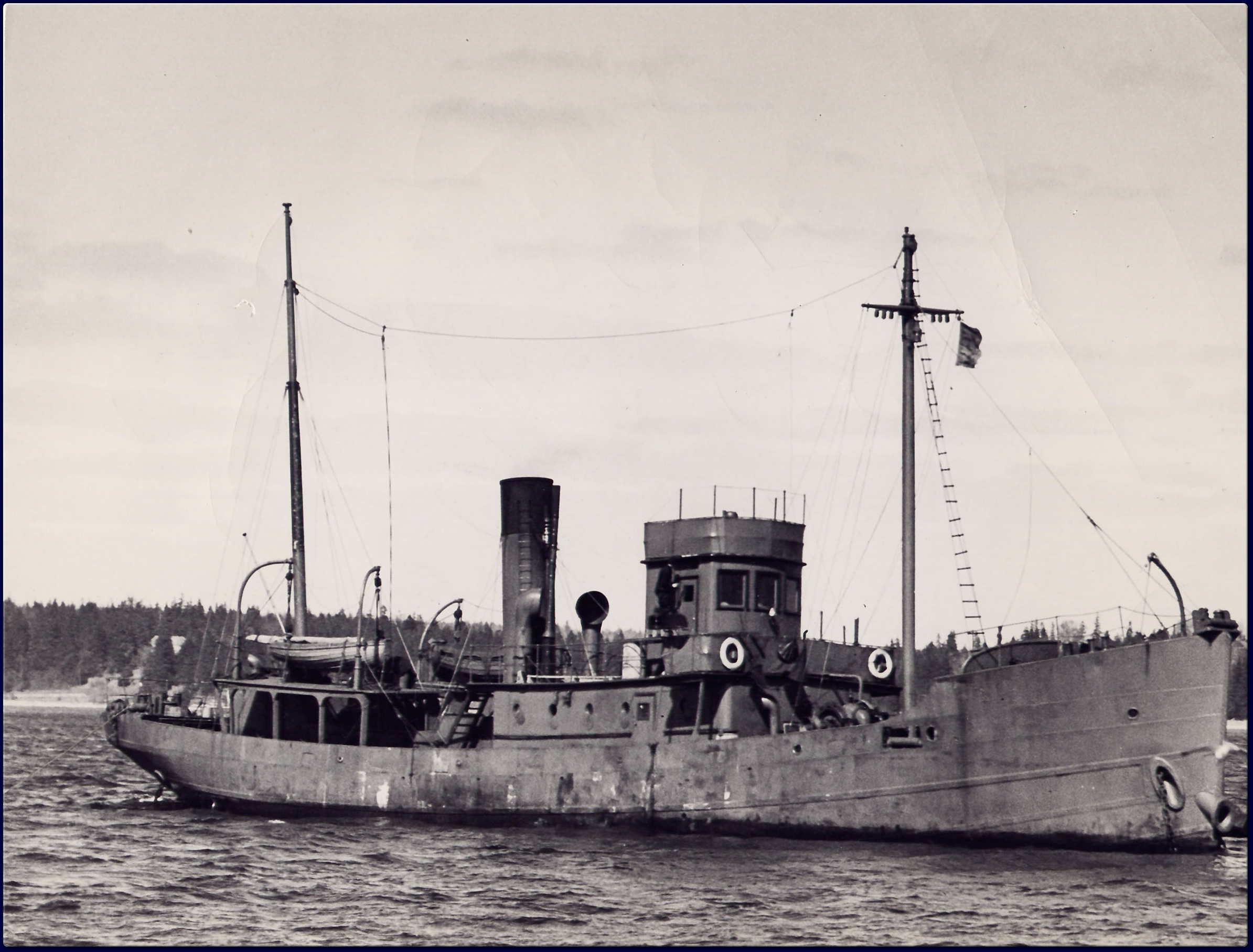
- St Eloi without her gun

History

Canada
- Name: St. Eloi
- Namesake: Action of St Eloi Craters March – April 1916
- Ordered: 2 February 1917
- Builder: Polson Iron Works Limited, Toronto
- Launched: 2 August 1917
- Commissioned: 13 November 1917
- Decommissioned: 1920
- Recommissioned: 1940
- Decommissioned: June 1945
- Renamed: Re-designated Lightship No. 20
- Fate: Disposed of in 1962; final fate unknown

General characteristics
- Class & type: Battle-class naval trawler
- Displacement: 320 long tons (330 t)
- Length: 130 ft (40 m)
- Beam: 23 ft 5 in (7.14 m)
- Draught: 13 ft 5 in (4.09 m)
- Propulsion: 1 x triple expansion, 480 ihp (360 kW)
- Speed: 10 knots (12 mph; 19 km/h)
- Armament: 1 × QF 12-pounder 12 cwt naval gun

HMCS St. Eloi was one of twelve Battle-class naval trawlers constructed for and used by the Royal Canadian Navy (RCN) during the First World War. Following the war the ship was transferred to the Canadian Department of Marine and Fisheries and converted into a lightvessel. Re-designated Lightship No. 20, the vessel returned to RCN service in 1940 to become the gate vessel Gate Vessel 12 during the Second World War. After the war, the trawler returned to government service and was discarded in 1962.

== Design and description ==
The RCN's Battle-class trawlers formed part of the Canadian naval response to Admiralty warnings to Canada about the growing German U-boat threat to merchant shipping in the western Atlantic. Intended to augment anti-submarine patrols off Canada's east coast, these ships were modelled on contemporary British North Sea trawlers, since the standard types of Canadian fishing vessels were considered unsuitable for patrol work.

Twelve vessels were ordered on 2 February 1917 from two shipyards, Polson Iron Works of Toronto and Canadian Vickers of Montreal. Those vessels built at Polson Iron Works displaced 320 long tons (330 t) and were 130 feet (40 m) long overall with a beam of 23 feet 5 inches (7.14 m) and a draught of 13 feet 5 inches (4.09 m). They were propelled by a steam-powered triple expansion engine driving one shaft creating 480 indicated horsepower (360 kW) giving the vessels a maximum speed of 10 knots (19 km/h; 12 mph).

All twelve trawlers were equipped with a QF 12-pounder 12 cwt naval gun mounted forward. (Note: "Cwt" is the abbreviation for hundredweight, 20 cwt referring to the weight of the gun.) This was considered to be the smallest gun that stood a chance of putting a surfaced U-boat out of action, and they also carried a small number of depth charges. The trawlers were named after battles of the Western Front during the First World War that Canadians had been involved in. They cost between $155,000 and $160,000 per vessel. (Note: Adjusted for inflation to 2026 dollars, $2,859,663 to $2,951,910) (Note: Tucker places the cost at $191,000 (adjusted for inflation to 2026 dollars, $3,523,843))

== Service history ==
Named after the Action of the St. Eloi Craters, the trawler was built by Polson Iron Works at Toronto, Ontario, and was launched on 2 August 1917. Intended for use during the 1917 shipping season, the construction of the vessels was delayed by the entry of the United States into the war. With higher wages found south of the border, a shortage of skilled labour developed in the shipyards, coupled with a shortage of construction material. St. Eloi was commissioned on 13 November 1917.

St. Eloi sailed to the east coast where for the 1918 shipping season, all the Battle-class trawlers were assigned to patrol and escort duties based out of Sydney, Nova Scotia. Following the sinking of the merchant vessel Luz Blanca off Halifax, Nova Scotia, St. Eloi, Armentières and Festubert were tasked with hunting for the German submarine U-156, which had been operating off the coast of Nova Scotia. The Battle class was used for patrol and escort duties off the Atlantic coast of Canada until the end of the war.

The trawler remained in RCN service until being paid off in 1920. St. Eloi was turned over to the Department of Marine and Fisheries and, like sister ships Messines, St. Julien, and Vimy, was converted to a lightvessel. This involved placing an electric light at the foremast head and installing a foghorn atop a latticework tower. The ship was re-designated Lightship No. 20 and remained as such until 1940. Returned to the RCN in 1940, St. Eloi became a gate vessel, designated Gate Vessel 12, and spent part of the war at Shelburne, Nova Scotia. Handed over to the Department of Transport (the successor department of the Department of Marine and Fisheries) in June 1945, St. Eloi was ultimately disposed of in 1962.
