= P.V. type minesweeping trawler =

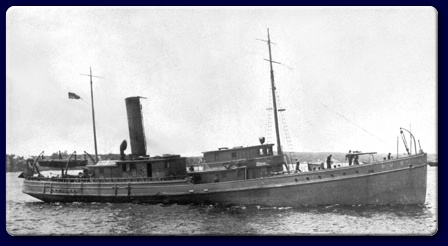
- HMCS P.V. II

Class overview
- Name: P.V. type
- Operators: Royal Canadian Navy
- Built: 1903–1912
- In service: 1917–1919
- Completed: 7
- Retired: 7

General characteristics
- Type: Minesweeper/naval trawler
- Displacement: 247–390 long tons (251–396 t); (Varied between each ship)
- Length: 126 ft (38.4 m)–151 ft 6 in (46.2 m); (Varied between each ship)
- Beam: 22 ft 3 in (6.8 m)–24 ft 1 in (7.3 m); (Varied between each ship)
- Draught: 9 ft 2 in (2.8 m)–13 ft (4.0 m); (Varied between each ship)
- Speed: 8 knots (15 km/h; 9.2 mph)
- Armament: 1 × QF 12-pounder (76 mm) gun

The P.V. type minesweeping trawlers were seven Royal Canadian Navy minesweeping trawlers built before the First World War in the United States. Initially constructed and used as menhaden trawlers they were taken into service the Royal Canadian Navy during the First World War for patrol duty along the Atlantic coast. Following the war they were returned to their original service.

== Construction and design ==
The seven vessels that made up the P.V. type were initially named William H. Murray, Amagansett, Herbert N. Edwards, Martin J. Marran, Rollin E. Mason, Leander Wilcox and Rowland H. Wilcox. The trawlers were built at three locations in northeastern United States. William H. Murray, Amagansett, Herbert N. Edwards and Martin J. Marran were constructed at Rockland, Maine. Rollin E. Mason was built at Essex, Massachusetts and Leander Wilcox and Rowland H. Wilcox were constructed at Noank, Connecticut.

The seven vessels that made up the P.V. type were of varying but similar dimensions. William H. Murray and Amagansett were the largest of the seven. They were 151 feet 6 inches (46.2 m) long with a beam of 24 feet 1 inch (7.3 m) and a draught of 13 feet (4.0 m). They had a displacement of 390 long tons (400 t). Both were launched in 1912. Herbert J. Edwards, Martin J. Marrin and Rollin E. Mason had the same length and beam of the previous two, however, their draught was 12 feet 9 inches (3.9 m) and had a displacement of 323 long tons (328 t). All three were launched in 1911 Leander Wilcox was 126 feet (38.4 m) long with a beam of 22 feet 3 inches (6.8 m) and a draught of 9 feet 2 inches (2.8 m) and had a displacement of 205 long tons (208 t). She was launched in 1903. Rowland H. Wilcox was 132 feet (40.2 m) long with the same beam as Leander Wilcox. However, her draught was deeper at 10 feet 7 inches (3.2 m) and she displaced 247 long tons (251 t). Rowland H. Wilcox was launched in 1911. All seven vessels had a maximum speed of 8 knots (15 km/h; 9.2 mph).

== Service history ==
The seven P.V. type vessels were constructed as menhaden fishing trawlers for use in the Atlantic fishery. In January 1917, the Royal Navy demanded that the Royal Canadian Navy expand its patrol force to protect the shipping lanes around the Canadian Atlantic coast. However, the British had no intention of providing any of their fleet of trawlers or patrol vessels in support. As part of the Royal Canadian Navy's effort to increase the number of patrol vessels, inquiries were sent to the United States to acquire suitable vessels. Those inquiries resulted in the seven menhaden trawlers being purchased in New England. Commissioned into the Royal Canadian Navy, they took on new names. William H. Murray became P.V. I, Amagansett became P.V. II, Herbert N. Edwards became P.V. III, Martin J. Marran became P.V. IV, Rollin E. Mason became P.V. V, Leander Wilcox became P.V. VI and Rowland H. Wilcox became P.V. VII. Their 8-knot speed made them more suitable as minesweepers and they were converted into such with the addition of a QF 12-pounder (76 mm) gun placed forward.

Entering service in March 1917, the seven trawlers formed a minesweeping flotilla based out of Sydney, Nova Scotia for the remainder of the war until April 1919. In April they were disarmed and resumed their former purpose as fishing trawler. They returned to their former names as well.
