= CGS Vigilant =

Canadian Fisheries Protection patrol vessel

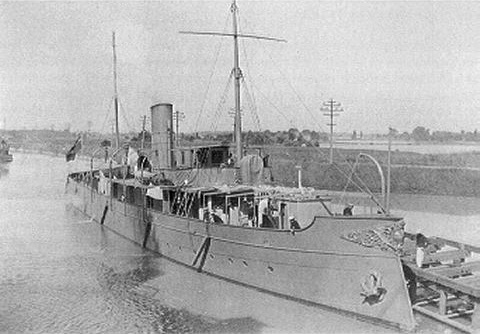
- Vigilant alongside

History

Canada
- Name: Vigilant
- Builder: Polson Iron Works Ltd., Toronto
- Launched: 11 September 1904
- Completed: 1904
- Fate: Sold, 1924; Scrapped, 1956

General characteristics
- Type: Patrol vessel
- Tonnage: 396 GRT
- Length: 175 ft (53.3 m)
- Beam: 22 ft (6.7 m)
- Draught: 10 ft (3.0 m)
- Propulsion: Triple expansion steam engine; 130 hp (97 kW) (nominal), 1,250 ihp (932 kW); 2 × screws
- Speed: 17 knots (31 km/h; 20 mph)
- Armament: 2 × QF 3-pounder guns

CGS Vigilant (Note: CGS stands for Canadian Government Ship) was a Fisheries Protection patrol vessel employed on the Canadian Great Lakes. Completed in 1904, the vessel remained in service on the Great Lakes until 1924. The vessel was then chartered by the Canadian Customs Preventive Service until 1929 for service on the East Coast of Canada. The ship was sold to private interests and converted to a barge. She remained in service until 1956 when the vessel was broken up.

== Description ==
Vigilant, designed as an armed patrol vessel for service on the Great Lakes, was of steel construction and fitted with a ram bow. The vessel was 175 feet (53.3 m) long with a beam of 22 feet (6.7 m) and a draught of 10 ft (3.0 m). Vigilant had a tonnage of 396 gross register tons (GRT). The ship was powered by two triple expansion steam engines driving two screws creating 130 hp (97 kW) (nominal) or 1,250 indicated horsepower (932 kW). This gave the vessel a maximum speed of 17 knots (31 km/h; 20 mph). The vessel was armed with two QF 3-pounder guns.

== Service history ==
Vigilant, described as the "first modern warship to be built in Canada", was acquired for patrol service on the Great Lakes to replace the aging CGS Petrel. The vessel was constructed by Polson Iron Works Limited at their shipyard in Toronto and was launched on 11 September 1904, and completed later in the year.

Vigilant was sometimes described as a "third class cruiser". Vigilant was credited at the time by the Minister of Marine and Fisheries, Louis-Philippe Brodeur as being the nucleus of the future Royal Canadian Navy. Upon entering service, the crew of the vessel wore naval-style uniforms, a first for Canada. The vessel entered service in 1904 as a fisheries patrol vessel. On 7 June 1905 Vigilant collided with the 12 gross register tons (GRT) fishing steamer Grace M. six miles (9.7 km) east of Middle Island in Lake Erie. Grace M sank and two of fishing vessel's crew drowned in the incident. Vigilant remained on fisheries patrol until 1924, when the vessel was sold by the Department of Marine and Fisheries.

In 1926 Vigilant was chartered by the Customs Preventive Service for East Coast patrols to counter smuggling. Between 1927 and 1929, Vigilant patrolled Nova Scotia's Atlantic coast. The vessel was later converted to a barge and was scrapped in 1956 by Steel Co. in Hamilton, Ontario.

== Sources ==
- Boutiller, James A., ed. (1982). RCN in Retrospect, 1910–1968. Vancouver: University of British Columbia Press. ISBN 0-7748-0196-4.
- Hadley, Michael L.; Huebert, Rob & Crickard, Fred W., eds. (1992). A Nation's Navy: In Quest of Canadian Naval Identity. Montreal, Quebec and Kingston, Ontario: McGill-Queen's University Press. ISBN 0-7735-1506-2.
- Johnston, William; Rawling, William G.P.; Gimblett, Richard H. & MacFarlane, John (2010). The Seabound Coast: The Official History of the Royal Canadian Navy, 1867–1939. Vol. 1. Toronto: Dundurn Press. ISBN 978-1-55488-908-2.
- Maginley, Charles D. & Collin, Bernard (2001). The Ships of Canada's Marine Services. St. Catharines, Ontario: Vanwell Publishing Limited. ISBN 1-55125-070-5.
- McDougall, David J. (1995). "The Origins and Growth of the Canadian Customs Preventive Service Fleet in the Maritime Provinces and Eastern Québec, 1892–1932" (PDF). The Northern Mariner. V (4). Thousand Oaks, California: Sage Publications: 37–57. doi:10.25071/2561-5467.740. ISSN 1183-112X. S2CID 247655770.
- "Vigilant (117070)". Miramar Ship Index.
