= CGS Alaska =

Canadian exploration ship

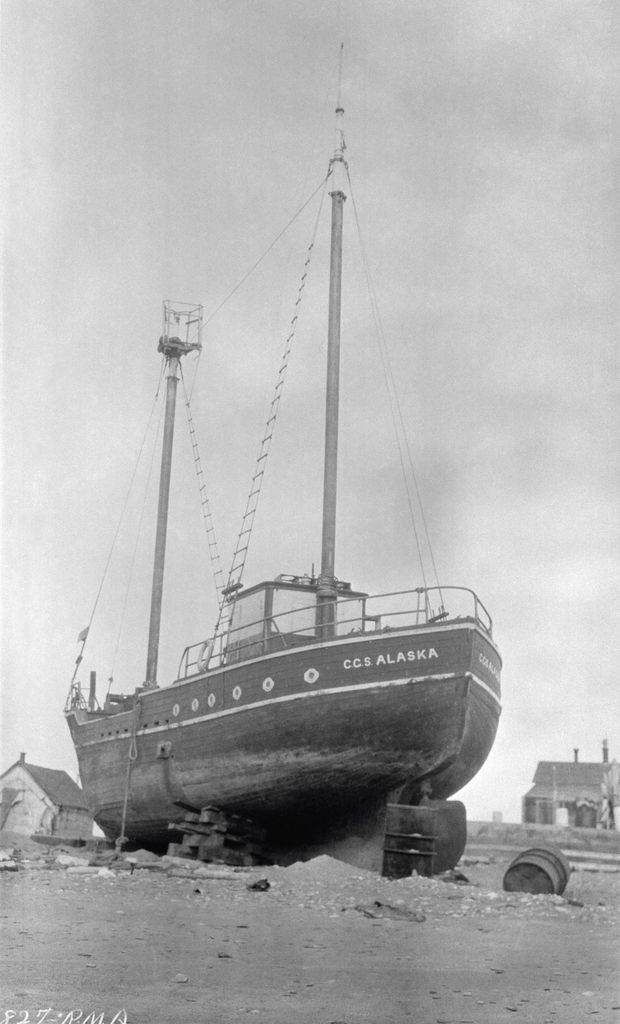
CGS Alaska pulled onto beach at Nome.

CGS Alaska was a Canadian Government Ship, employed on a survey of Canada's Arctic, in the early 20th century. She was a schooner, built in Alaska, in 1912, and acquired by the Canadian Government, which employed her as part of a fleet of 6 small exploration ships from 1913–1918. She was the only ship that lasted the entire expedition. She was sold in 1918.
